= Virgin Bhasskar 2 =

Indian web series

- Official Poster
- Written by: Ajaydeep Singh; Manish Kumar
- Directed by: Sangieta Rao
- Starring: Anant V Joshi; Rutpanna Aishwarya Sethi; Dherendra Kumar Tiwari; Jiya Shankar; Himanshu Arora
- Music by: Harshwardhan Dixit
- Country of origin: India
- Original language: Hindi
- No. of seasons: 2
- No. of episodes: 13 (list of episodes)

Production
- Running time: 18-25 minutes
- Production company: Balaji Telefilms

Original release
- Network: ALT Balaji; ZEE5
- Release: 29 August 2020

Related
- Virgin Bhasskar

Virgin Bhasskar 2 is a 2020 Hindi language Indian comedy web series directed by Sangieta Rao. It is produced under Balaji Telefilms. The show streamed on ZEE5 on 29 August 2020.

== Plot ==
Bhaskar's life turns upside down after accepting Pakhi's deal of writing together. Heartbroken after several attempts at getting back to his love, Vidhi, he decides to leave everything behind-hitchhiking on highway, with no money or a destination and without the pressure of being in love. Bhaskar is finally set free.

== Cast ==
Actor	Role	Appearances
Anant V Joshi	Bhaskar Tripathi	Main
Rutpanna Aishwarya Sethi	Vidhi Pandey	Main
Jiya Shankar	Pakhi	Main
Dherendra Kumar Tiwari	Mishra	Recurring
Himanshu Arora	Rohan	Recurring
Rohit Kumar	Ranveer	Recurring
Rani Chatterjee	Naika Patel	Recurring

== Episodes ==
Series	Episodes	Originally released
2	12	29 August 2020

No. overall	No. in season	Title	Directed by	Written by	Original release date
12	1	"Woh Aa Gayi Hai!"	Sakshat Dalvi and Sangieta Rao	Ajaydeep Singh and Manish Kumar	29 August 2020
A new 'Bad Boy' has entered the competition, Bhasskar is furious. Rohan gives few tips to Bhasskar to spice up his life with Vidhi. Bhasskar arrives at Vidhi’s place but instead finds someone else.
13	2	"The Bad Boy Is Back"	Sakshat Dalvi and Sangieta Rao	Ajaydeep Singh and Manish Kumar	29 August 2020
An outraged Bhasskar crashes into Paakhi and eventually befriends her. Rohan is on his quest for true love. Meanwhile, Vidhi’s father is looking for a potential partner for Vidhi.
14	3	"Mishra Ki Mishri"	Sakshat Dalvi and Sangieta Rao	Ajaydeep Singh and Manish Kumar	29 August 2020
Mishra gives valuable lessons about first love to his students of Mishralogy. Meanwhile, Bhasskar attracts a partner for his erotic literature. But Mishra isn’t pleased to meet Bhasskar’s new partner.
15	4	"Bad Boy-Bad Girl Ka Kohram"	Sakshat Dalvi and Sangieta Rao	Ajaydeep Singh and Manish Kumar	29 August 2020
Paakhi cracks a deal with Batuknath and convinces Bhasskar to be a part of it. Mishra meets a new student for Mishralogy while spreading his teaching about yoni.
16	5	"Mishra Ki 5 Shartein"	Sakshat Dalvi and Sangieta Rao	Ajaydeep Singh and Manish Kumar	29 August 2020
Mishra keeps his conditions for Bhasskar and Pakhi’s partnership deal. Bhasskar and Pakhi have a small scuffle but stay quiet. Batuknath orders Bhasskar to convince Pakhi to get back.
17	6	"Bhasskar aur Pakhi ka special din"	Sakshat Dalvi and Sangieta Rao	Ajaydeep Singh and Manish Kumar	29 August 2020
Mishra befriends the special guest from the previous Mishralogy performance. Bhasskar purchases a gift for Pakhi and takes her out on a date. Rohan and Mishra plan to print an adv. for Bhasskar’s Birthday. Heartbroken Pakhi shares a moment with Bhasskar.
18	7	"Swabhaav Se Thoda Sharmila Hai"	Sakshat Dalvi and Sangieta Rao	Ajaydeep Singh and Manish Kumar	29 August 2020
Mishra, Pakhi and Rohan plan a surprise for Bhasskar, but fate has other plans for them. Rohan runs into a group of men who are searching for Pakhi.
19	8	"Panchayati Pyaar"	Sakshat Dalvi and Sangieta Rao	Ajaydeep Singh and Manish Kumar	29 August 2020
Pakhi's brothers take her and Bhasskar to their house. Vidhi misunderstands the situation. Rohan and Mishra accompany Bhasskar to Pakhi’s house.
20	9	"Bhasskar Ki Bad Girl"	Sakshat Dalvi and Sangieta Rao	Ajaydeep Singh and Manish Kumar	29 August 2020
Pakhi and her father, along with Abhishek Yada, help Bhasskar and his friends to run away. Bhasskar then arrives at Vidhi’s house to meet her, but instead meets her father.
21	10	"Hum Sex Kar Chuke Hain"	Sakshat Dalvi and Sangieta Rao	Ajaydeep Singh and Manish Kumar	29 August 2020
Bhasskar tries his best to win Vidhi back, but fails. After meeting Keshav, Bhasskar tries to convince him to call off his engagement with Vidhi. Later, Keshav gets into a bind and Bhasskar arrives to his rescue. Will Bhasskar be able to convince Vidhi now?
22	11	"Sex Aur Pyaar Ek Cheez Hai?"	Sakshat Dalvi and Sangieta Rao	Ajaydeep Singh and Manish Kumar	29 August 2020
A dejected Bhasskar returns home with Rohan and Mishra who try to cheer him up. However, he ends up having an argument with Mishra.
23	12	"Aatmanirbhar Virgin Bhasskar"	Sakshat Dalvi and Sangieta Rao	Ajaydeep Singh and Manish Kumar	29 August 2020
Mishra invites Bhasskar to give a speech during his Mishralogy class. Pakhi and Vidhi watch the live feed of Bhasskar’s heartfelt speech and start doubting their decisions. Later, Bhasskar leaves for a much-needed vacation.
