= Anant Joshi =

Indian television actor (born 1989)

Anant Vijay Joshi
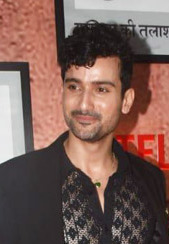
- Joshi in 2023
- Born: 26 October 1989 (age 36); Agra, Uttar Pradesh, India
- Occupation: Actor
- Years active: 2011–present

Anant Vijay Joshi (born 26 October 1989) is an Indian actor who first became known for playing the title role in the ALTBalaji series Virgin Bhasskar (2019–2020). He has since starred in the television series Yeh Kaali Kaali Ankhein (2022), Maamla Legal Hai (2024), and films Kathal (2023), 12th Fail (2023) and Ajey: The Untold Story of a Yogi (2025).

== Filmography ==
=== Films ===
Year	Title	Role	Notes	Ref.
2011	Woh 5 Din			
2018	Ye CineMaa Hai	Hrithik Roshan	iPhone film	
2019	Mera Ram Kho Gaya	Sahir		
2022	Cobalt Blue	Aseem Dixit	Netflix film	
2023	Kathal	Constable Saurabh Dwivedi	Netflix film	
2023	12th Fail	Pritam Pandey		
2024	Blackout	Ravi		
2025	Ajey: The Untold Story of a Yogi	Ajey / Yogi Adityanath		
2026	One Two Cha Cha Chaa	Sadda		

=== Television ===
Year	Title	Role	Notes	Ref.
2015	Zindagi Abhi Baaki Hai Mere Ghost	Ishaan Palekar		
2017	Kya Qusoor Hai Amala Ka?	Dev		
2018	Karn Sangini	Lord Krishna		
2019	Tara From Satara	MK		
2020–2021	Story 9 Months Ki	Veer Malhotra		

=== Web series ===
Year	Title	Role	Platform	Notes	Ref.
2018	Gandii Baat	Doodhnath	ALTBalaji	Season 1, Episode 1	
2019–2020	Virgin Bhasskar	Bhaskar Tripathi	ALTBalaji	Season 1–2	
2020	Be My Quarantine	Joy	YouTube		
2020	Paurashpur	Aditya	ALTBalaji and ZEE5		
2022	Yeh Kaali Kaali Ankhein	Golden	Netflix		
2024–2026	Maamla Legal Hai	Vishwas Pandey	Netflix	Season 1–2	
2026	Gullak	Anand Mishra	SonyLIV	Season 5	
2026	Chumbak	Freddy Taraporewala	Netflix		

=== Short films ===
Year	Title	Role	Platform	Notes
2018	Svah: So be it!	Amit Khanna	ZEE5	ZEE5 Originals

== See also ==
- List of Indian actors
- List of Indian television actors
