= Aabha Paul =

Indian actress and model (born 1987)

- Born: Aabha Paul; 7 August 1987 (age 39); Ghaziabad, Uttar Pradesh, India
- Occupation: Actress
- Years active: 2006–present

Aabha Paul (born 7 August 1987) is an Indian actress and model, who works in Hindi films. She is known for her role in Kamasutra 3D (2013), directed by Rupesh Paul, which was screened at the Cannes Film Festival in 2013. In 2019, she appeared in the ALT Balaji series Gandii Baat by Ekta Kapoor. Aabha also starred as Sarita Nair in an erotic drama Mastram which was released in 2020. She has also starred in other series such as XXX, Lolita P.G House, Namkeen and Hai Taubba. She has worked in music video of song "Dunalli".

== Personal life ==
Aabha Paul was born in 1987 in Ghaziabad, Uttar Pradesh, India.She studied from Shri Hans Inter College High School.

== Career ==
Aabha Paul started her modelling career in 2005. In 2006, she won beauty pageant Miss Delhi award. In 2010, she had a small part in Veer, starring Salman Khan, but her part was edited out.

In 2017, she appeared in Taste, a Tamil film. In 2021, she acted as lead in Lolita PG House. In 2021, she appeared in Abhay Shukla's Namkeen. Later, she starred in the ALT Balaji series Hai Taubba. Aabha's performance in the series was lauded.

== Filmography ==
=== Films ===
Year	Title	Role	Language
2010	Veer		Deleted scene
2013	Kamasutra 3D		Hindi
2017	Taste		Tamil

Year	Title	Role	Note
2019	Gandii Baat	Mami ji	S03E02
2020	Mastram	Sarita Nair	S01E03
2020	XXX		S02E04
2021	Lolita PG House	Lolita	
2021	Namkeen		
2021	Hai Taubba	Adhya	
2023	Honeymoon Suite Room No 911	Lisa	
