= Suchitra Pillai =

Indian actress and voice actress

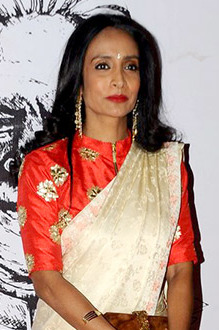
- Born: 27 August 1970 (age 56); Ernakulam, Kerala, India
- Education: Fr. Conceicao Rodrigues College of Engineering
- Occupations: Actress; singer; voice actress; VJ
- Years active: 1993–present
- Musical career
- Genres: Pop; rock
- Instrument: Vocals
- Label: Sony Music

Suchitra Pillai (born 27 August 1970) is an Indian actress, model, anchor and VJ. A graduate in electronic engineering from the Fr. Conceicao Rodrigues College of Engineering, Bandra (West), Mumbai, she chose a career in arts over engineering. Apart from movie roles, including Dil Chahta Hai (2001), Page 3 (2005), Laaga Chunari Mein Daag (2007), and Fashion (2008), Suchitra is a singer in the Indi pop and rock genre with an album Such is Life released in 2011. She is also a theater artist.

== Personal life ==
When Suchitra was twenty she married Pavan Malik and later divorced. In 2005, Suchitra married Lars Kjeldsen, an engineer from Denmark, whom she met at a mutual friend's house. They have one daughter.

== Film career ==
While in school in Mumbai, Pillai was interested in theatre but graduated with a B.E. in Electronics Engineering in 1991. She left for London soon after, where she became involved in a children's theatre. She started acting in movies in 1993 when she was offered her first role in a French film Le prix d'une femme as well as a role in the English film Guru in Seven. She has also appeared in the music videos of "Arranged Marriage" (1993) by Apache Indian and "Morning Glory" (1995) by Oasis (band).

Pillai then returned to Mumbai and was offered a job as a veejay. She first appeared in a music video by Apache Indian and then in Bally Sagoo's "Dil cheez hai kya" video. She has also forayed into television with shows like Simply South, Red Alert, Hip Hip Hurray, Beintehaa, Rishta.com, and Cabaret Cabaret. Pillai appears in the 2016 Hollywood film The Other Side of the Door, and in the 2017 indie film The Valley, for which she won the Best Actress award at both The Long Island International Film Festival and The Milan International Filmmakers Festival in 2017.

== Filmography ==
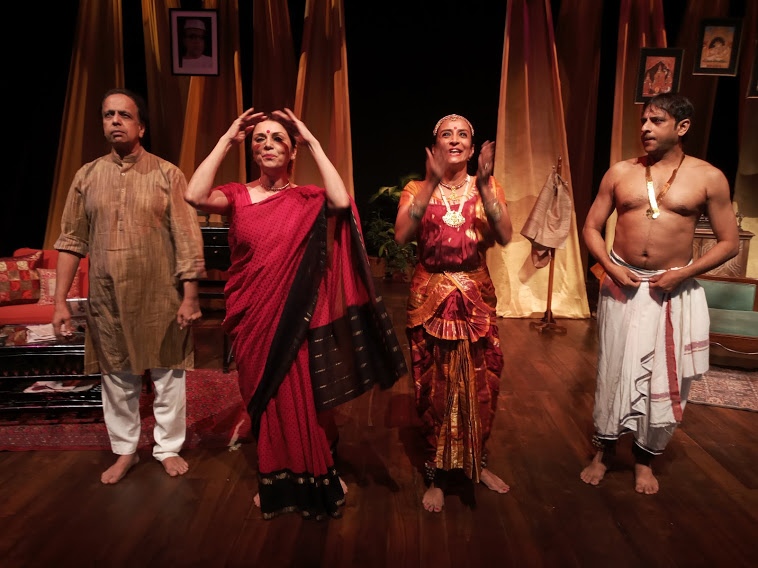
"Dance like a Man" performance with cast, Ananth Mahadevan, Lillete Dubey, Suchitra Pillai & Joy Sengupta, at Prithvi Theatre, 2021.

=== Films ===
Year	Title	Role	Other notes
1993	Le prix d'une femme		French film
1998	Guru in Seven		English film
2001	Everybody Says I'm Fine	Jessica	Hindi film
2001	Bas Itna Sa Khwaab Hai	A Reporter	
2001	Dil Chahta Hai	Priya	
2003	Waisa Bhi Hota Hai Part II	Shalu	
2003	Satta	Neelu	
2003	88 Antop Hill	Mrs. Antara Shelar	
2005	Page 3	Fashion Designer Sonal Roy	
2006	Shiva	Manasi	
2006	Karkash	Manasi	
2006	Pyaar Ke Side Effects	Anjali/Dracula	
2007	Marigold: An Adventure in India	Rani	
2007	Laaga Chunari Mein Daag	Michelle	
2008	Fashion	Avantika Sarin	
2008	Dasvidaniya	Suchi	
2010	Dulha Mil Gaya	Jasmine	
2016	Fitoor	Reporter	
2016	The Other Side of the Door	Piki	
2016	Oppam	School Principal	Malayalam film
2017	The Valley	Roopa	
2021	Cold Case	Zara Zacchai	Malayalam film

=== Television ===
Year	Title	Role	Channel	Other notes
1997	Ghar Jamai	Subbulakshmi	Zee TV	Special Appearance only in Episode no 32
1998	Hip Hip Hurray	Alaknanda Ma'am	Zee TV	
1998	X Zone	Kavya	Zee TV	Episode-96
2001	Pradhan Mantri	Journalist	Zee TV	
2003–2005	kkoi Dil Mein Hai	anjula	Sony TV	
2013	24	Mehek Ahuja	Colors TV	
2013–2014	Beintehaa	Surraiya Usman Abdullah	Colors TV	
2014	Bigg Boss 8	Guest	Colors TV	Reality show
2016–17	Ek Shringaar – Swabhiman	Sandhya Singhania	Colors TV	

=== Web series ===
Year	Title	Role	Network	Notes
2017	Romil & Jugal	Bhagyalaxmi Subramaniam	ALTBalaji	
2018	Kehne Ko Humsafar Hain	Sheena	ALTBalaji and ZEE5	
2019	Made in Heaven (TV series)	Mani Pandey	Amazon Prime	
2020	Betaal	Commander Tyagi	Netflix	Horror
2020	Bebaakee	Dana Alqaazi	ALTBalaji	Hindi Web series
2021	Call My Agent: Bollywood	Suchitra	Netflix	Hindi Web series
2021	Hello Mini 3	KD Maa	MX Player	
2022	Bestseller	Sukanya	Amazon Prime	Hindi Web series
2022	Eternally Confused and Eager for Love	Ray's mother	Netflix	Hindi Web series
2023	Rana Naidu	Tara	Netflix	Web series
2024	Big Girls Don't Cry	Khanna Ma'am	Prime Video	Hindi series
2024	Call Me Bae	Neel's Mother	Prime Video	Hindi series

== Singing career ==
Pillai made her debut as a singer with her first song in the album Mere Liye in 2001. Later, she sang few other songs.

== Dubbing career ==
In 2007, she performed her first dub-over role in the Hindi version of the American movie, Live Free or Die Hard- Maggie Q's role of Mah Linh. Since then she has dubbed several other roles in Hindi; the parts of Angelina Jolie (Beowulf), Maggie Gyllenhaal (The Dark Knight), as Hela for Cate Blanchett in the Hindi version of Thor: Ragnarok, and most recently in the 2020 Netflix original October Faction as Deloris Allen.

== Dubbing roles ==
=== Live action television series ===
Program title	Actor	Character	Dub Language	Original Language	Episodes	Original airdate	Dubbed airdate	Notes
The Sandman	Gwendoline Christie	Lucifer Morningstar	Hindi	English		2022–present		

=== Live action films ===
Film title	Actress	Character	Dub Language	Original Language	Original Year Release	Dub Year Release	Notes
Live Free or Die Hard	Maggie Q	Mai Linh	Hindi	English	2007	2007	
The Dark Night	Maggie Gyllenhaal	Rachel Dawes	Hindi	English	2008	2008	Katie Holmes portrayed this character in Batman Begins and was voiced by Neshma Chemburkar in Hindi.
Thor: Ragnarok	Cate Blanchett	Hela	Hindi	English	2017	2017	

== See also ==
- Dubbing (filmmaking)
- List of Indian dubbing artists
- List of Indian film actresses
