= Flora Saini =

Indian actress and model

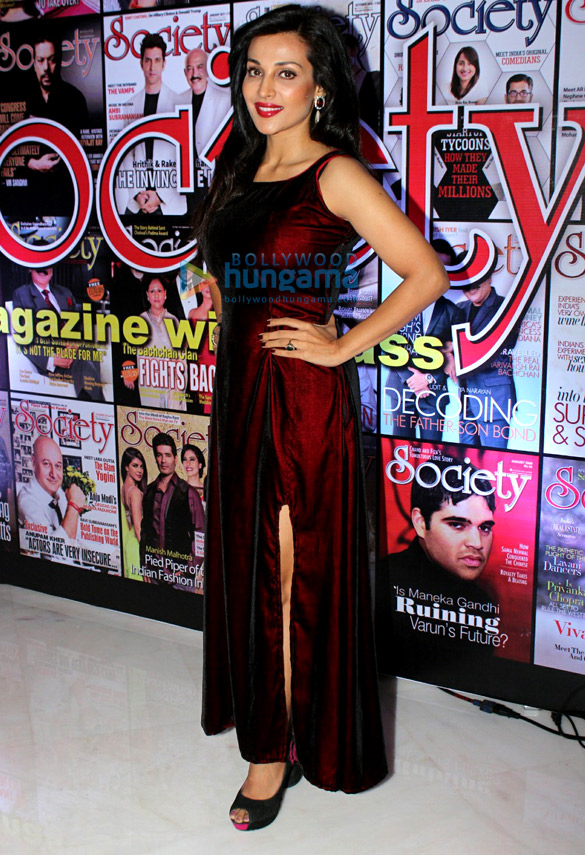
- Flora in 2017
- Born: Flora Saini; Chandigarh, India
- Occupations: Actor; model
- Years active: 1999–present

Flora Saini, also known by her screen name Asha Saini or Mayuri, is an Indian actress and model. She predominantly works in Telugu and Hindi films, and has also appeared in a number of Kannada and Tamil films.

She has done more than 80 projects as an actress. Since her debut in Prema Kosam (1999), she has acted in over 50 films and co-starred with noted actors of the Telugu film industry.

== Early life ==
Born in Chandigarh to an army officer, Flora began her schooling in Udhampur, Jammu and Kashmir. She continued her education in the Army Public School, Dhaula Kuan, Delhi. Her family then moved to Kolkata, where she started pursuing a modeling career. She participated in the Miss Kolkata beauty pageant.

== Career ==
Flora made her acting debut in the 1999 Telugu film Prema Kosam. The producer of the film rechristened her as Asha Saini; some years later she would adopt a new screen name, Mayuri, as per the advice of an astrologer, before eventually reverting to her original name.

The actress subsequently played supporting roles in more than a dozen Telugu-language films, such as Nuvvu Naaku Nachav (2001), in the next three years.

She appeared in the film Narasimha Naidu (2002), It was for some time the most notable film in her filmography, and it led to her being referred to as "Lux Papa" thereafter.

In 2002, Flora made her first Hindi-language film, starring in the T. P. Aggarwal-produced Bharat Bhagya Vidhata. Her second Hindi film, Love in Nepal (2004), also produced by Agarwal, saw her paired with Sonu Nigam.

Flora has appeared in several Kannada-language films, too, including Giri, starring Srinagara Kitty, and Nammannna, starring Sudeep.

In March 2008, she was arrested in Chennai for supposedly having forged visa documents, and was subsequently banned from the Tamil film industry. She claimed innocence, and the ban was lifted a couple of weeks later.

Three films in which Flora Saini stars – the Telugu-language Broker, and two Kannada-language films, Vismaya Pramaya and Vah Re Vah – were released on 31 December 2010.

She received The Great Daughter of Soil Award in Mauritius for her anti-poverty work there in 2010.

She was then seen in season 2 of web-series Gandii Baat with Anveshi Jain, where she played a lead role. Recently, Saini was seen in many web series and notably worked in Mayanagari-City of Dreams of Hotstar.

In 2015, Flora Saini appeared in MSG: The Messenger starring Gurmeet Ram Rahim. She played the role of a daughter, Muskan, with Jayshree Soni as Kasam and Olexandra Semen as Alice.

In October 2019 Flora Saini made her debut in Bengali web series Dupur Thakurpo on hoichoi. In the 3rd season of the series, she played the iconic role of Phulwa Boudi.

In 2023, she appeared as Rani Gulkanda in Khichdi 2: Mission Paanthukistan.

In 2025, Flora would make an appearance on Star Maa, with her participation in Bigg Boss Telugu 9. However, she would be evicted on Day 35, after completing a month in the show.

== Filmography ==
=== Films ===
Year	Film	Role	Language	Notes
1999	Prema Kosam	Aishwarya	Telugu	
2000	Antha Mana Manchike	Nisha	Telugu	
2000	Sabse Bada Beiman		Hindi	
2000	Yeh Hai Green Signal		Hindi	
2000	Manasunna Maraju		Telugu	
2000	Chala Bagundi	Ganga	Telugu	
2001	Cheppalani Vundi		Telugu	
2001	Sardukupodaam Randi	Nisha	Telugu	
2001	Timepass		Telugu	
2001	Akka Bavekkada	Shilpa	Telugu	
2001	Navvuthu Bathakalira		Telugu	
2001	Narasimha Naidu	Sandhya	Telugu	
2001	Prematho Raa	Anitha	Telugu	
2001	Rowdysheeter		Telugu	
2001	Subhakaryam		Telugu	
2001	Nuvvu Naaku Nachav	Asha	Telugu	
2002	O Chinnadana	Asha	Telugu	
2002	Adrustam	Smita / Pinky	Telugu	
2002	Kodanda Rama	Sangeetha	Kannada	
2002	Sontham	Asha	Telugu	Cameo appearance
2002	Bharat Bhagya Vidhata	Shabnam	Hindi	
2003	Ottesi Cheputunna		Telugu	Cameo appearance
2004	Love in Nepal	Maxi	Hindi	
2004	143	TV reporter	Telugu	
2004	Swamy		Telugu	Special appearance
2004	Gajendra	Kausalya	Tamil	
2005	Giri		Kannada	
2005	Mr. Errababu		Telugu	Special appearance
2005	Nammanna	Rani	Kannada	
2005	Sorry Enaku Kalyanamayidichu	Manju	Tamil	
2006	Kusthi	Abhi	Tamil	
2008	Michael Madana Kamaraju	Mandira	Telugu	
2008	Swagatam	Deepthi	Telugu	
2008	Kuselan		Tamil	Special appearance
2008	Dheemaku	Indira Devi	Kannada	
2008	Chedugudu		Telugu	
2008	Dindigul Sarathy		Tamil	Special appearance
2009	Aa Intlo	Pallavi	Telugu	
2009	Junction		Telugu	Special appearance
2010	Comedy Express		Telugu	
2010	Naane Ennul Illai		Tamil	
2010	Kanagavel Kaaka		Tamil	Special appearance
2010	Broker	Ganapathi's wife	Telugu	
2010	Vismaya Pramaya	Meera	Kannada	
2010	Vaare Vah	Adi's boss	Kannada	
2011	Chattam		Telugu	Special appearance
2011	Money Money, More Money		Telugu	
2012	Dabangg 2		Hindi	Cameo appearance as reporter
2013	CID Eesha		Kannada	
2013	Aakasamlo Sagam	Vasu	Telugu	
2013	Sahasra		Telugu	Special appearance
2014	Paisa Yaar N Panga	Meera	Punjabi	
2014	Ya Rab		Hindi	
2014	Lakshmi	Swarna	Hindi	
2015	MSG: The Messenger	Muskan	Hindi	
2015	Dhanak	Gypsy Woman	Hindi	
2015	Guddu Ki Gun	Nurse	Hindi	
2016	Do Lafzon Ki Kahani	Natasha	Hindi	
2017	Begum Jaan	Maina	Hindi	
2018	Stree	Stree	Hindi	
2019	Fraud Saiyaan	Shraddha	Hindi	
2020	Bahut Hua Samman	Sapna Rani	Hindi	
2020	Darbaan	Charul Tripathi	Hindi	
2021	12 'O' Clock	Maya D'Souza	Hindi	
2021	200 Halla Ho	Poornima	Hindi	
2021	Chaddi	Mrs.Chaddha	Hindi	
2022	36 Farmhouse	Mithika Singh	Hindi	
2023	Khichdi 2: Mission Paanthukistan	Rani Gulkanda - Queen of Paanthukistan	Hindi	

=== Television ===
Year	Series	Role	Language	Notes
2019	Apna News Aayega		Hindi	
2020	Mere Sai – Shraddha Aur Saburi	Suvarna Bai, a female singer and dancer	Hindi	A mythological TV serial, show premiered in Sony Entertainment Television.
2025	Bigg Boss Telugu 9	Contestant	Telugu	Evicted-Day 35

=== Web series ===
All web series are in Hindi language, otherwise noted the language.

Year	Series	Role	Platform	Notes	Ref.
2016	Maid in India	Maid	Webtalkies		
2016	A.I.SHA My Virtual Girlfriend	Mariyam James	Arre OTT		
2018	Gandii Baat	Sajelli	ALTBalaji	S02E01	
2018	X.X.X	Rukmani Lalwani	ALTBalaji	S01E01	
2018- 2019	Inside Edge	Ayesha Dewan	Amazon Prime	Season 1 Recurring; Season 2 Main	
2019	Wanna Have A Good Time		Ullu		
2019	Bombers	Minister's Wife	ZEE5		
2019	Dupur Thakurpo	Phulwa Boudi	Hoichoi	Bengali webseries	
2019	Mayanagari: City of Dreams	Mystery Woman	Hotstar		
2020	Aarya	Radhika "Rads"	Hotstar	Season 1 Recurring	
2020	Paurashpur	Nayantara	ZEE5, ALTBalaji	Recurring	
2021	Akkad Bakkad Rafu Chakkar	P.C	Amazon Prime		
2023	Rana Naidu	Kavya	Netflix		
2023	The Trial (Indian TV series)	Anisha Menon	Disney+Hotstar		
