= Garima Jain =

Indian actress (born 1993)

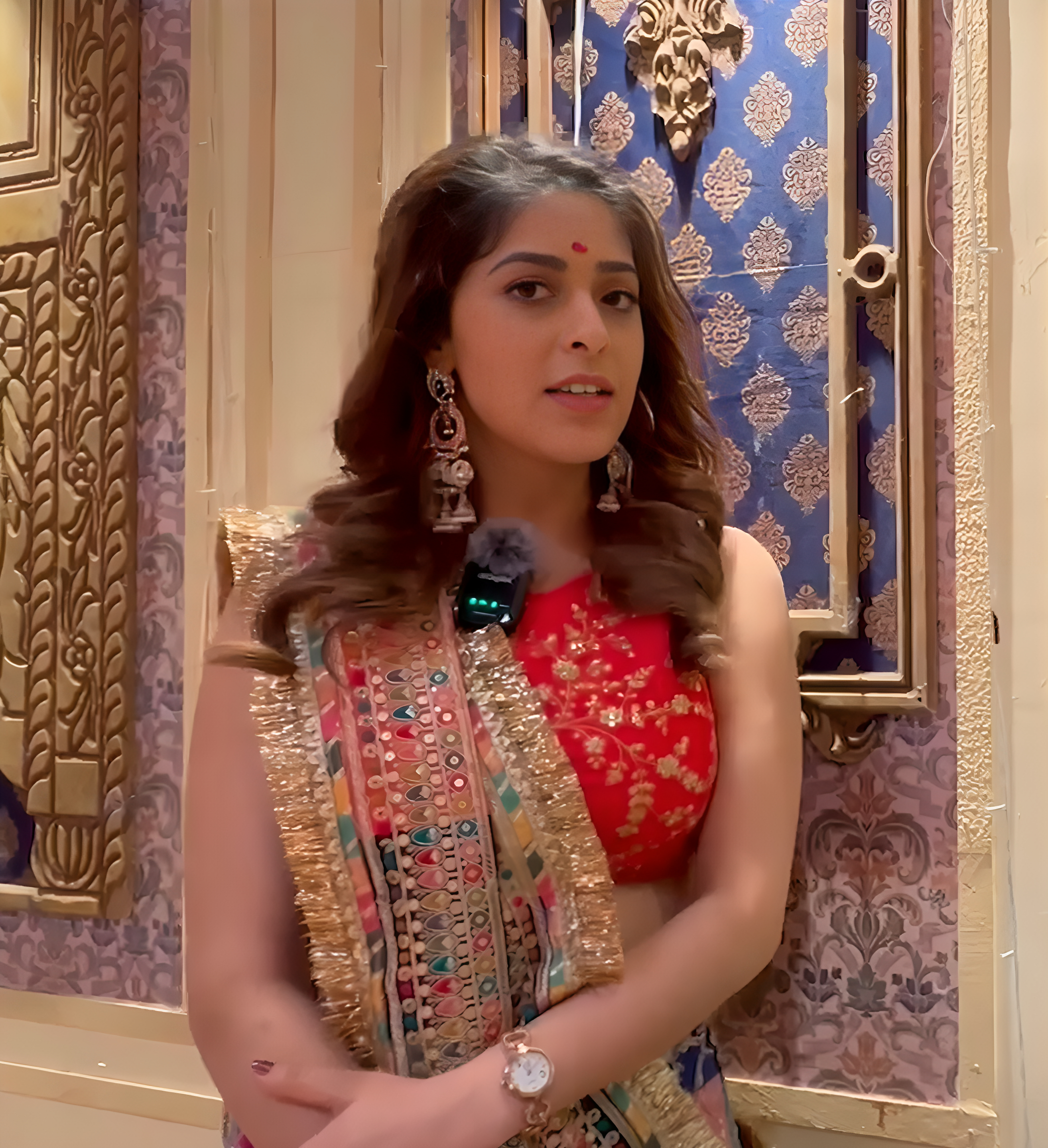
- Jain in 2024
- Born: 13 March 1993 (age 33); Indore, Madhya Pradesh, India
- Occupations: Theatre personality, actress

Garima Jain is an Indian actress, trained singer and Kathak dancer. Working in and known for her roles in primarily television shows, she was featured in Guinness Book of World Records in 2009 for attempting 1000 rounds of Kathak in 9 minutes 2 seconds.

Apart from television shows, Jain has also appeared in several adult and erotic web series including Gandii Baat, XXX and Twisted. In 2019, she portrayed a reporter in the commercially successful crime thriller film Mardaani 2.

== Personal life ==
Jain was born in Indore, and her mother name is Archana Jain. Her brother Dhairya Jain is an entrepreneur.

Jain was earlier in relationship with Vivian Dsena for few months in 2018. In 2019, she was engaged to Raahul Sarraf, a diamond merchant. But later the marriage was called off.

== Career ==
=== Television ===
During the beginning period of her career Jain signed consecutively episodic roles in Gudgudee as Pinky, Balika Vadhu as Ananya, Rehna Hai Teri Palkon Ki Chhaon Mein as Rashmi, Devon Ke Dev...Mahadev as Urmila, Mrs. Kaushik Ki Paanch Bahuein as Shreya and Madhubala – Ek Ishq Ek Junoon as Garima. After playing the supporting part of Julie Chaturvedi in Aaj Ki Housewife Hai...Sab Jaanti Hai (2012–13), she appeared as herself in episodic of MTV Timeout with Imam and Love Dosti Dua.

From 2013 to 2014, Jain simultaneously acted in two television shows: the mythological show Mahabharat and psychological thriller Main Naa Bhoolungi. She played Dushala in the former and Arya Jagannath in the latter. In 2015 she featured in three television serials: Yeh Hai Mohabbatein, Hello Pratibha and 2025 Jaane Kya Hoga Aage. She began 2016 via a special cameo in Kavach...Kaali Shaktiyon Se.

In June 2016, Jain joined the social transgender based series Shakti - Astitva Ke Ehsaas Ki as Raavi Singh and was praised for her performance. However, she quit the show in March 2018 and was replaced by Pooja Singh. Next she portrayed the important character of Nisha in supernatural show Tantra as well as episodic roles in Vikram Betaal Ki Rahasya Gatha, Navrangi Re! and Shrimad Bhagwat Mahapuran.

=== Films ===
Jain made her debut into Hindi cinema with Hivade Me Fute Laadu (2016) and then played a reporter in the critically acclaimed as well as commercially successful crime thriller film Mardaani 2 (2019). Her 2021 only film release is Aafat-e-Ishq.

=== Web series ===
Jain entered digital world in 2020 with Ekta Kapoor's erotic romance web series Gandii Baat on ALT Balaji, in which her role was of Kamlesh. In ALT Balaji's another erotic web series XXX 2 the same year, she starred as the sensible and smart Kavya who is unhappy with her marriage. Her next digital project was Vikram Bhatt's web series Twisted 3 which saw her portray Jiya Mehta onscreen. She also agreed to feature in Mastram, available on MX Player.

== Filmography ==
=== Films ===
Year	Film	Role	Notes
2015	Chitram Cheppina Katha		Unreleased Telugu Film
2016	Hivade Me Fute Laadu	Ghotaki	
2019	Mardaani 2	Reporter	
2021	Aafat-E-Ishq	Girl in magazine	ZEE5 Film

=== Television ===
Year	Title	Role	Notes
1999	Gubbare	Pinky	
2008	Balika Vadhu	Ananya	
2009	Rehna Hai Teri Palkon Ki Chhaon Mein	Rashmi	
2011–2014	Devon Ke Dev Mahadev	Urmila	
2012	Mrs. Kaushik Ki Paanch Bahuein	Shreya	
2012	Madhubala – Ek Ishq Ek Junoon	Garima	
2012–2013	Aaj Ki Housewife Hai... Sab Jaanti Hai	Julie Chaturvedi	
2013	MTV Timeout with Imam	Herself	Episodic role
2013	Love Dosti Dua	Herself	Episodic role
2013–2014	Mahabharat	Duhsala	Recurring Role
2013–2014	Main Naa Bhoolungi	Arya Mahanto Jagannath	Recurring Role
2015	Yeh Hai Mohabbatein	Trisha	Recurring Role
2015	Hello Pratibha	Namrata Agarwal	Main lead
2015	2025 Jaane Kya Hoga Aage	Geetanjali Joshi	Main lead
2016	Kavach	Nisha Angre	
2016–2018	Shakti - Astitva Ke Ehsaas Ki	Raavi Singh	Recurring Role
2016	Bhakton Ki Bhakti Mein Shakti		
2018–2019	Vikram Betaal Ki Rahasya Gatha	Lopamudra & Raktmanjari	2 Episodes
2018–2019	Tantra	Nisha	Recurring Role
2019	Navrangi Re!	Maneka	Episodic role
2019	Shrimad Bhagwat Mahapuran	Devi Shachi	Episodic role
2021	Humkadam		
2023	Na Umra Ki Seema Ho	Sakshi	
2024	Shiv Shakti – Tap Tyaag Tandav	Devi Tulasi	
2024	Shrimad Ramayan	Ahalya	
2025	Itti Si Khushi	Kim	
2026	Juhi Mui	Pankhuri Ahlawat	

=== Web series ===
Year	Title	Role	Platform	Notes
2020	Gandii Baat 4	Kamlesh	ALTBalaji ZEE5	S04 E03
2020	XXX: Season 2	Kavya	ALTBalaji	S02 E05
2020	Twisted 3	Jiya Mehta	Jio Cinema	Season 3
2020	Mastram	Abhinetri Indurekha	MX Player	S01 E07
2021	The Prayag Raj			
