= Anveshi Jain =

Indian actress and singer

- Born: Khajuraho, Chhatarpur, Madhya Pradesh, India
- Citizenship: Indian
- Education: Rajiv Gandhi Proudyogiki Vishwavidyalaya (BEng)
- Occupations: Actress; Model; Singer; Influencer; Emcee; Engineer
- Years active: 2018–present
- Notable work: Gandii Baat

Anveshi Jain is an Indian actress, model, social media influencer, singer, and TEDx speaker. She gained recognition after her debut web series in 2019, Gandii Baat, which marked her entry into the Indian film industry.

== Early and personal life ==
Anveshi Jain was born in Khajuraho, Chhatarpur, Madhya Pradesh, India to a Jain family. She studied Electrical and Electronics Engineering at Rajiv Gandhi Proudyogiki Vishwavidyalaya and had thought of pursuing an MBA in Indore. She discontinued her MBA course before moving to Mumbai and gave several auditions over there to get a break into the film industry. Prior to getting work in Gandii Baat, she worked as a singer and emcee as well. Before bagging a role in that series, she was told to get in shape. As a result she went on a strict diet and did rigorous exercise for 90 days. She even took up acting workshops as well. She mentioned that this was her one final attempt in this acting career and what she didn't forsee was the impact. She also mentioned that she played the role assuming that nobody would watch it since the series had bold sexual content and also requested the makers not to include her name in the credits.

In 2022, she revealed hitting puberty early, leading to a significant increase in breast size. At 14, her father imposed restrictions, requiring her to wear extra layers and salwar-kameez to cover her chest. She frequently faced objectifying comments and looks. When her lovemaking scene in that episode of Gandii Baat went viral right after it was released in January 2019, her relations with her family and loved ones were strained. She had to take a break from her relationship with her boyfriend as the role had taken a toll on her romantic relationship. She struggled to get rid of her erotic image but according to her therapy taught her to accept it rather than struggling to fight it. She mentioned that she embraced that image and started to use it for her benefit. Hence, she started sharing videos where she wore cleavage-baring blouses, short dresses or saree. However she said that she doesn't do erotic roles anymore.

She also started to take up other assignments. She hosts events and gives motivational talks. During her live sessions on social media, she talks to her fans about anxiety, self-esteem issues and loneliness. On some days, she simply reads to them from the Kamasutra. She was invited to speak at the TEDx Talk event as well.

She also mentioned that whenever someone would ask her where she hails from and she would reply Khajuraho, she often receives a sly look as people would correlate her bold erotic image to her hometown which is known for temples having erotic sculptures.

== Career ==
In 2019, Anveshi got her first show Gandii Baat which gained her overnight success. In the first episode of second season she played a bisexual village woman named Neeta. This was her sole appearance in the entire web series. The lovemaking scene between her and Flora Saini went viral and she gained fame overnight. Her Instagram following experienced a significant increase. After that, she reportedly became one of the most-Googled celebrities towards the end of 2019.

In June 2019, Anveshi launched an official app, through which she interacts with her fans through live sessions, shares unseen pictures, music videos, dating vlogs, and new shows. The app was inspired by a fan-created application that initially gained 40 thousand downloads in a single day. She made special appearances on BOSS: Baap of Special Services and Who's Your Daddy?. In 2020 she appeared in Lakshmikanth Chenna's Commitment, marking her Telugu debut. In the same year, she made her debut in Dhollywood with playing lead role in the film G. In 2021, Anveshi ventured into music with the release of "Jugnu" on SpotlampE. In 2022, Anveshi performed in an item number song in Ravi Teja’s film Ramarao on Duty called "Naa Peru Seesa" sung by Shreya Ghoshal. She also appeared in the web series Tera Chhalaava in the same year.

== Filmography ==
Year	Film	Role	Language	Notes
2019	Gandii Baat	Neeta	Hindi	Web series Appears only in Season 2 Episode 1 (S02E01) – "Bai-sexual"
2019	Gudiya Ki Shaadi		Hindi	Theatre play
2019	BOSS: Baap of Special Services	Megha	Hindi	Web series
2020	Who's Your Daddy?	Ms. Chhibber	Hindi	
2020	Commitment	Dr. Rekha Gupta	Telugu	Debut in Telugu
2020	G		Gujarati	Debut in Gujarati
2022	Ramarao on Duty	Sarangi (Seesa)	Telugu	Cameo appearance in a song
2022	Tera Chhalaava	Rehana	Hindi	
2024	Martin	Martin's Girlfriend	Kannada	Debut in Kannada
2025	Dragon	Sherin	Tamil	Debut in Tamil; cameo appearance

Key
†	Denotes films that have not yet been released

== Discography ==
Year	Track	Composer	Ref
2021	"Jugnu"	Viplove Rajdeo	
2024	"Banjaare"		
