= Martin (2024 film) =

2024 Indian film by A. P. Arjun

- Theatrical release poster
- Directed by: A. P. Arjun
- Screenplay by: A. P. Arjun
- Story by: Arjun Sarja
- Dialogues by: Gopinath Krishna Murthy; A. P. Arjun
- Produced by: Uday K. Mehta; Suraj Uday Mehta
- Starring: Dhruva Sarja; Vaibhavi Shandilya; Anveshi Jain; Sukrutha Wagle
- Cinematography: Satya Hegde
- Edited by: K. M. Prakash; Praveen K Gowda
- Music by: Mani Sharma (songs); Ravi Basrur (score)
- Production companies: Vasavi Enterprises; Uday K Mehta Productions
- Distributed by: Mythri Movie Makers (Andhra Pradesh and Telangana); KVN Productions; Invenio Origin; M S Films (Tamil Nadu)
- Release date: 11 October 2024
- Running time: 148 minutes
- Country: India
- Language: Kannada
- Budget: ₹80–150 crore
- Box office: ₹27.6 crore

Martin is a 2024 Indian Kannada-language action thriller film directed by A. P. Arjun, from a story by Arjun Sarja, and produced by Uday K. Mehta and Suraj Uday Mehta. It stars Dhruva Sarja in dual roles, alongside Vaibhavi Shandilya, Sukrutha Wagle, Achyuth Kumar and Nikitin Dheer. The music was composed by Mani Sharma and Ravi Basrur, while the cinematography and editing were handled by Satya Hegde and K. M. Prakash.

Martin was theatrically released on 11 October 2024, coinciding with Dasara, where it was panned by critics and became a box office bomb. Despite being a box office bomb, it is still one of the top 10 highest-grossing Kannada movies of 2024.

== Plot ==
In Pakistan, a mysterious person is injected with drugs, where he loses his memory and becomes aggressive. The person's aggressiveness leads him to get captured and imprisoned, but he escapes from the prison and manages to regain some memories with the help of Pakistani locals, whom he had met including a lollipop-selling kid, a weapons dealer and an ally Regina. The person learns that he is actually Arjun Saxena, an IRS officer. However, Regina gets assassinated by Martin, a notorious international crime boss who is known for his trademark of shooting and killing his opponents in the left eye.

Arjun contacts his friend Parashuram IPS and learns that he arrived in Pakistan to capture Martin. He tells Parashuram that he and his friend Vivek, an MMA fighter, are in danger from Martin. Arjun arrives in Mumbai through a cargo boat and arrives at Andheri Railway Junction to meet Parashuram, but he gets attacked and Parashuram is killed by Martin's henchmen. Arjun tries to inform Vivek, who is in a MMA match, but he is also eventually killed. Arjun reunites with his friend Sathya and his fiancèe Preeti, where he learns that Preeti is also a target of Martin and plans to lure and capture him in Mangalore, using Preeti as bait. Arjun and Sathya protect her and fend off the masked attackers, but Arjun regains his memory and injures Sathya, shockingly revealing himself as Martin. It is revealed that Arjun and Martin are actually doppelgängers and that Arjun was in a coma in Pakistan for 15 days under the care of Regina's friend Shabnam, a Pakistani ally and an undercover officer. Arjun awakes from his coma and Shabnam reveals to him that Martin has escaped to India.

Past: While on duty, Arjun seizes an illegal shipment, containing defective and hazardous medicine from Mushtaq, who runs a pharmaceuticals racket. Arjun captures and imprisons his henchmen. Mushtaq seeks the help of Martin, who agrees to help Mushtaq in exchange for money. Martin frames Arjun for killing Mushtaq's henchmen and gets him suspended, whilst also threatening him by killing Preeti if he tries to come after him again. Arjun interrogates Martin's henchman Munna, with Parshuram's help, and learns that Martin has left for Pakistan. Arjun arrives in Pakistan and interrogates multiple weapons dealers, with Shabnam's help, to locate Martin. Martin learns that Arjun is in Pakistan and kills Regina, telling his girlfriend to leave for Mumbai and kill Parashuram and Vivek. Martin arrives in an under-construction building, where Arjun is interrogating the dealers. Martin kills the dealers, overpowers Arjun, leaving a bullet mark on Martin's body to prove that he and Martin are different, and sends him into a coma. Martin, while escaping, falls from the building and gets admitted to the hospital himself, while Shabnam takes Arjun to a safe place.

Present: Arjun arrives in Mangalore, where Martin is with Sathya and Preeti in a hospital. He reaches the hospital, but Martin takes Preeti to his hideout on a cruise ship. Arjun plans to destroy the containers, while Martin threatens Arjun in killing Preeti if the containers are not returned as Arjun threatens to destroy the containers. Mushtaq secretly plans to intercept Arjun and the cargo trucks without Martin's knowledge. Arjun fends off the bikers, but he gets attacked by artillery jeeps. However, Martin destroys the jeeps and reveals that Vivek, Parashuram and Regina were actually working with Mushtaq, who not only sells hazardous medicines, but also supplies illegal weapons to terrorists. Martin reveals that he learnt that Mushtaq had attempted to kill him and also tried to overtake him to retrieve the containers. Martin makes a deal with Arjun that he will return Preeti to Arjun in exchange for erasing Martin's identity. Arjun reluctantly agrees to the deal. Mushtaq arrives with the money to take the containers, but Martin and Arjun kill Mushtaq. Martin destroys Mushtaq's containers and escapes with the money. Arjun receives appreciation by receiving a medal for completing the mission.

Three months later, Arjun watches a news footage about several people who were killed by being shot in their left eyes in different cities, assuring him that Martin is behind the killings. In the aftermath, Arjun receives a call from Martin, who is now living under a new identity as Rhino.

== Cast ==
- Dhruva Sarja in a dual role as:
  - Martin / Rhino
  - Arjun Saxena, as an IRS officer
- Vaibhavi Shandilya as Preeti
- Achyuth Kumar as Ashok Kumar, Arjun's Senior
- Anveshi Jain as Martin's girlfriend
- Sukrutha Wagle as Shabnam
- Chikkanna as Sathya
- Prathap Narayanan as Vivek
- Malavika Avinash as a Pakistani doctor
- Nikitin Dheer as Mushtaq
- Vajrang Shetty as Munna
- Nawab Shah as a Pakistani jailer
- Rohit Pathak as a Pakistani jailer
- MK Matta as Karim
- Sriram Reddy Polasane as Surgeon
- Nathan Jones as Jail fighter
- Rubiel Mosquera as Jail fighter
- Giorgia Andriani as dancer in the song "Jasmine"

== Production ==
The film's shooting lasted 252 days. The climax was shot in 52 days. The film features 5000 segments with visual effects. According to Dhruva Sarja, the film was originally made on a budget of ₹80 crore and incurred a "landing cost" of ₹120 crore. Daily News and Analysis reported that the budget is ₹150 crore.

== Music ==
Martin

Soundtrack album by Mani Sharma
- Released: 11 October 2024
- Recorded: 2023–24
- Genre: Film soundtrack
- Length: 10:45
- Language: Kannada
- Label: Saregama

Mani Sharma composed the soundtrack, while Ravi Basrur composed the musical score. The soundtrack album was secured by Saregama.

The first single titled "Jeevan Neene" was released on 3 September 2024. The second single titled "Anthem of Martin" was released on 5 October 2024.

No.	Title	Lyrics	Singer(s)	Length
1.	"Jeevan Neene"	A. P. Arjun	Sonu Nigam, Shruthika Samudhrala	3:56
2.	"Anthem of Martin"	A. P. Arjun	Prudhvi Chandra, Roll Rida	3:59
3.	"Jasmine Song"	Pramod Maravanthe	Harika Narayan	3:10
Total length:				10:45

== Release ==
=== Theatrical ===
Martin was theatrically released on 11 October 2024, coinciding with Dasara, in Kannada, along with the dubbed versions of Tamil, Telugu, Malayalam, Hindi and Bengali. Invenio Origin released the film across the country.

=== Home media ===
The satellite and digital streaming rights were sold to Zee Network and Amazon Prime Video. The film began streaming on Amazon Prime Video from 19 November 2024.

== Reception ==
The film received negative reviews from audience and critics.

S. Sridevi of The Times of India gave 2.5/5 stars and termed it as "all sound and spectacle and no substance." Jagadish Angadi of Deccan Herald gave 2.5/5 stars and wrote "Martin is strictly for die-hard action fans."

Sanjay Ponnappa of India Today gave 2/5 stars and wrote "Martin could have been a normal action thriller with a template story, had it not been pumped with so much budget and unnecessary chutzpah. From direction to all other technical departments like VFX, CGI, editing and more, every aspect of Martin was disappointing in massive proportions." Prathibha Joy of OTTPlay gave 2/5 stars and wrote "Martin feels like a lost opportunity; Dhruva vs Dhruva had potential, but what we get is a wafer-thin plot as old as time that will, perhaps, appeal to die-hard fans of DS Boss. For the rest, well, you’ve been warned."

Calling the film a "Big-Budget Disappointment", Shashiprasad SM of Times Now gave 2/5 stars and wrote, "Instead of focusing on a compelling story, screenplay, and thoughtful filmmaking, the emphasis seems to be on grandiosity, both visually and sonically." Goutham S of Pinkvilla gave 1.5/5 stars and wrote "Martin offers nothing new in terms of story. The movie once again delves into creating some awe out of a larger-than-life character, even leaving an opportunity to expand it into a franchise."

In a negative review, Vivek M.V. of The Hindu wrote "In a bid to elevate actor Dhruva Sarja’s stardom, the makers of ‘Martin’ fall short in delivering a coherent action drama. Apart from one intense chase involving cars and bikes and the high-octane climax sequence shot in a vast, desert-like landscape, the much-hyped action sequences lack style." Latha Srinivasan of Hindustan Times wrote "For Dhruva, this movie was meant to be a major milestone in his career but Martin has turned out to be all hype with no substance."
