= Pooja Dey =

Indian actress

- Born: Itanagar, Arunachal Pradesh, India
- Other names: Urmi
- Occupations: Actress, model
- Years active: 5years
- Known for: Dating in the dark, kabir singh, Gandi baat, Maaya 4, Oas, fuh se fantasy 3
- Mother: Jyoti Bhowmik

Pooja Dey is an Indian actress who works in Bollywood film industry. She has appeared in various projects like Gandii Baat, Dating in the Dark, Maaya 4, Oas, and Fuh se Fantasy.

== Career ==
Dey hails from Guwahati, Assam . She has started her acting career with the show Dating in the Dark. After that she has acted in Kabir Singh and Gandii Baat. Her upcoming web series is Maaya 4.

== Filmography ==
Work	Role	Platform	Ref.
Dating in The dark		MTV	
Maaya 4	Niharika Rao	Jio Cinema	
Oas	Amrita (Short film)		
Gandii Baat (season 5)	Nandini	Alt Balaji	
Fuh Se Fantasy 3	MS Sumona	Jio Cinema	
