= Rohit Kumar (actor) =

Indian actor and comedian

Rohitt Kummar
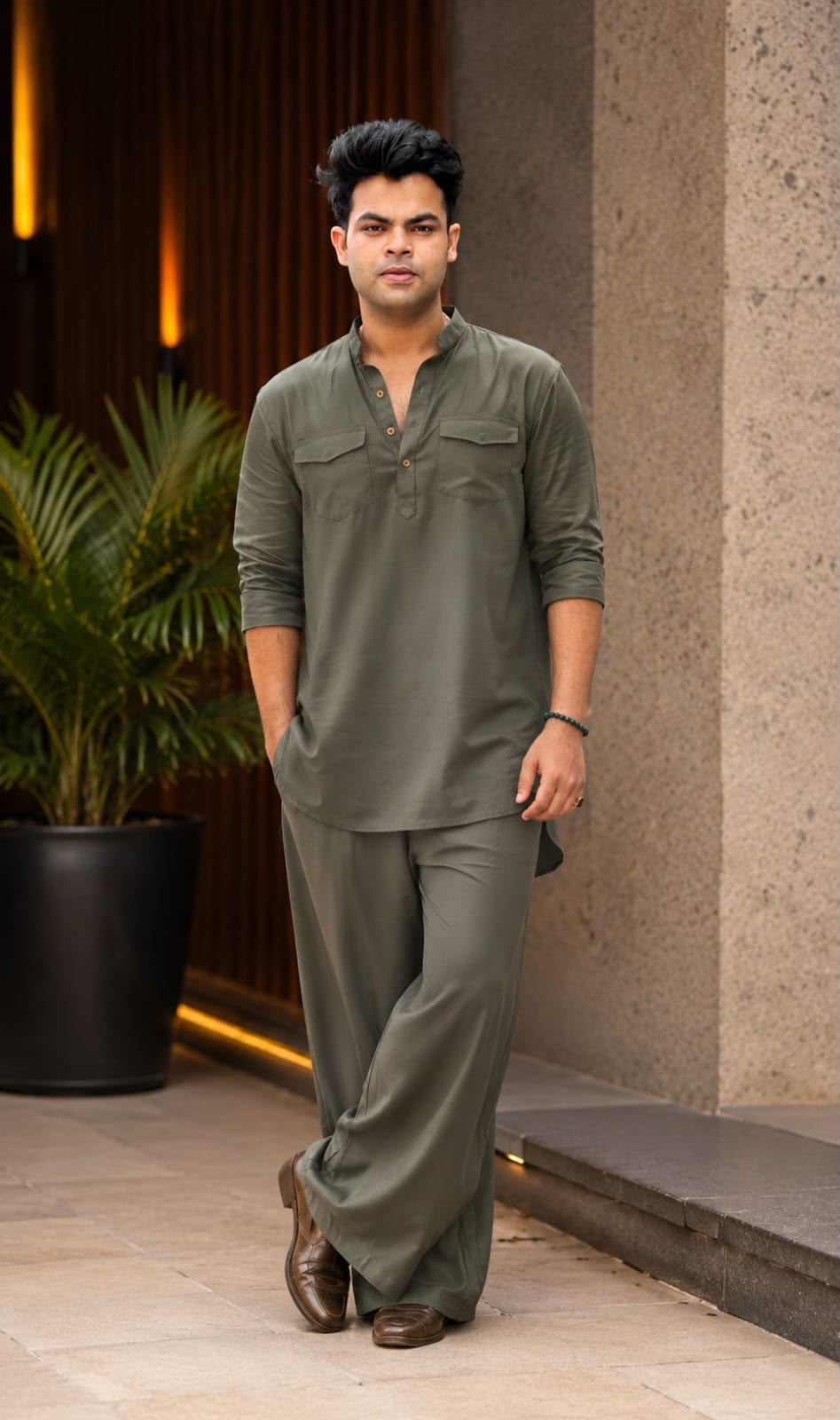
- Born: 8 September; Sonipat, Haryana
- Occupations: Actor; comedian
- Years active: 2020–present

Rohitt Kummar is an Indian TV actor and comedian. He is known for Nima Denzongpa and in this he played the comic role of Hemal. In 2023 he started playing a parallel lead in Suhaagan.

== Filmography ==
=== Films ===
Year	Film	Role	Notes
2022	Nikamma	Omi	
2022	Maja Ma	Chabbu	

=== Web series ===
Year	Film	Role	Notes
2020	Gandii Baat (Season 4)	Brijesh	
2020	Virgin Bhasskar 2	Ranveer	
2022	Asli Lucknowi Robots	Praveen	

=== Television ===
Year	Film	Role	Notes
2020	Jag Janani Maa Vaishno Devi – Kahani Mata Rani Ki	Kumbhak	
2021	Nima Denzongpa	Hemal	
2023–2024	Suhaagan	Niku	
