= XXX (Indian TV series) =

AltBalaji web series

- Cover photo
- Genre: Romance; Erotic; Comedy
- Directed by: Ken Ghosh, Prabhat Prabhakar
- Starring: Rithvik Dhanjani; Kyra Dutt; Aparnaa Bajpai; Priyanka Talukdar; Aparna Sharma
- Opening theme: "XXX" by
- Composer: Raju Singh
- Country of origin: India
- Original language: Hindi
- No. of seasons: 2
- No. of episodes: 11

Production
- Producer: Sakett Saawhney
- Production locations: Mumbai, India
- Camera setup: Multi-camera
- Running time: 18-28 minutes

Original release
- Network: ALT Balaji
- Release: 27 September 2018 – 8 February 2020

XXX is a 2018 Hindi-language erotic comedy-drama web series directed by Ken Ghosh for the video on demand platform ALT Balaji. It stars Kyra Dutt, Aparnaa Bajpai, Rithvik Dhanjani, Shantanu Maheshwari, Ankit Gera, Pryanca Talukdar and Aparna Sharma.

Principal photography of the planned film began in April 2015 and the film was scheduled to be released in 2016 but due to censorship issues, it would eventually be released on the web platform Alt Balaji on 27 September 2018 as a web series. The trailer was released on 20 September 2018.

== Cast ==
=== Season 1 ===
==== Bigg Bosss! ====
- Ankit Gera as Bunty (Big Boss)
- Priyanka Talukdar as Mallaika
- Rajat Rawell as Monty
- RJ Malishka as Kinky
- Vandana Sajnani as Pinky
- Flora Saini as Rukmani Ji

==== Sumitra G ====
- Shantanu Maheshwari as Bittu
- Aparna Sharma as Chandani (Sumitra Ji - in serial)
- Pawan Chopra as Bittu's Dad
- Karan Jotwani as Chandani's Boyfriend (Sumitra Ji's Son - in serial)
- Shashi Sharma as Daadi

==== Bidai ====
- Aparnaa Bajpai as Dulhan (The Bride)
- Rajesh Desai as Mannu (The Groom)
- Pratima Kazmi as Mannu's Mother
- Raj Gopal as Mannu's Father
- Tumul Balyan as Thief
- Sunny Charles as Bride's Father
- Anapurna as Bride's Mother
- Raj Gopal as Father-in-law
- Pratima Kazmi as Mother-in-law

==== Chota Vishal ====
- Aadar Malik as Vishal
- Sanket Bhosale as Chota Vishal (Voice-Over)
- Nehal Shah as Shilpa
- Raina Basnet as Hooker
- Manisha as Female Employee

==== The Climax ====
- Rithvik Dhanjani as Mayank
- Kyra Dutt as Kayra & Mayra (Double Role)

==== Special appearance ====
- Scarlett Mellish Wilson as item number in title track

=== Season 2: Uncensored ===
==== Pyaar Aur Plastic ====
- Aditi Kohli as Pam
- Parree Pande as Priya
- Ribbhu Mehra as Sanjay

==== Bose DK Bhaag ====
- Twinkle Tshering as Alisha
- ? as Teacher Mia

==== Triple Seat- X.X.X ====
- Thea D ‘Souza as Shanaya
- Paras Tomar as Kunal
- Pratik Sehajpal as Arijit

==== Sampoorn Rishta ====
- Aakash Chaudhary as Rahul
- Jashn Agnihotri as Alka
- Samiksha Bhatnagar as Myra
- Aabha Paul

==== Insecure Husband ====
- Garima Jain as Kavya
- Sumit Satija as Vihaan
- Mohit Kumar as Aarav

== Episodes ==
X.X.X. Uncensored is available on the streaming service ALT Balaji. All 5 episodes were released simultaneously on 27 September 2018, as opposed to a serialised format, to encourage binge-watching. A sixth episode was also released three months later, as the season finale.

Season	Episode	Title	Description	Duration	Release date
1	1	Bigg Bosss!	The one with the gift	24:00	27 September 2018
1	2	Sumitra-G	It's pay-back time	23:00	27 September 2018
1	3	Bidai	The first class wedding night	19:00	27 September 2018
1	4	Chota Vishal	Where's your mind at	25:00	27 September 2018
1	5	The Climax	When fantasies come to life	14:00	27 September 2018
1	6	Love Potion	Side Effects of Love	23:00	28 December 2018
2	1	Pyaar Aur Plastic	A 360 degree makeover	24:00	8 February 2020
2	2	Bose DK Bhaag	One life, No Limits	20:38	8 February 2020
2	3	Triple Seat	Accidental Life's Journey	19:00	8 February 2020
2	4	Sampoorn Rishta	The Circle Life	23:00	8 February 2020
2	5	Season Finale: Insecure Husband	To Cheat or Not to Cheat	24:00	8 February 2020

An FIR was filed against filmmaker Ekta Kapoor, alleging an insult to the national emblem, Hindu gods and army personnel in ALTBalaji's XXX web series. Ekta's representatives have since said that the controversial scene has been removed.
