= Dhimaner Dinkaal =

Bengali web series

- Genre: Comedy drama
- Written by: Padmanabha Dasgupta
- Directed by: Anindo Sarkar
- Creative director: Nimisha Pandey
- Starring: See Below
- Country of origin: India
- Original language: Bengali
- No. of seasons: 1
- No. of episodes: 10

Production
- Production locations: Kolkata, India
- Camera setup: Multi-camera
- Running time: 18-22 minutes
- Production company: Chayabani Balaji Entertainment

Original release
- Network: ALT Balaji
- Release: 11 December 2017

Dhimaner Dinkaal is a Bengali Comedy Web series that premiered on 11 December 2017 on ALT Balaji. It is the story about a simple Bengali man who is against mobile and social media.

The series is available for streaming on the ALT Balaji App and its associated websites since its release date.

== Plot ==
The series follows Dhiman Dutta, a traditional Bengali family man whose life is upended after connecting with a woman on social media. The narrative explores themes of familial loyalty, cultural values, and the social and personal consequences of modern digital connectivity.

== Cast ==
- Saswata Chatterjee as Dhiman Dutta
- Sreelekha Mitra as Anushila
- Kharaj Mukherjee as Khoraj
- Sudipta Banerjee as Priyangini/Bipasha
- Kalyani Mondal as Jaya
- Kushal Chakraborty as Sutanu
- Poonam Basak as Mithali
- Tapan Ganguly as Office Boss
- Kamal Ghosh as Ghosh Babu
- Mayna Banerjee as Lily
- Priya Dutt as Munni

== Episodes ==
- Episode 1: Boss Er Dhakka Phone Pakka
- Episode 2: Digital Mayajaal
- Episode 3: Lukochuri
- Episode 4: Aro Kacha Kachi Aro Kachey ...
- Episode 5: Sareer Geroy Porla Dhora
- Episode 6: E Ki Holo Keno Holo
- Episode 7: Ebar Porlo Dhora
- Episode 8: Tori Ki Ebar Dublo
- Episode 9: Khela Bhangar Khela
- Episode 10: Abar Mongol Sukro Chalu?
