= Manraj Singh =

Indian television and theatre actor

Manraj Singh Sharma
- Occupation: Actor
- Years active: 2014–present
- Known for: Romil & Jugal

Manraajh Singh is an Indian actor. He is best known for portraying the role of Jugal in the romantic web series Romil & Jugal (2017). He has appeared in several Hindi television and digital series, including Bade Achhe Lagte Hain 2, Qayamat Ki Raat, and Kehne Ko Humsafar Hain.

== Early life ==
Manraajh Singh is an alumnus of the Drama School Mumbai. He has stated that he believes more in spirituality than organized religion.

== Career ==
Manraajh began his acting journey in theatre before transitioning to television. He made his small-screen debut in 2014 with Yeh Dil Sun Raha Hai, produced by Balaji Telefilms.

In 2017, he gained recognition for his portrayal of Jugal in ALTBalaji’s web series Romil & Jugal, which explored a same-sex love story. A reviewer praised his performance for its sensitive and realistic approach.

Following this, Manraajh appeared in a number of Hindi television shows including Kaleerein, Kehne Ko Humsafar Hain, and Qayamat Ki Raat. From 2021 to 2023, he portrayed Shubham Kapoor in Bade Achhe Lagte Hain 2 on Sony TV.

In 2025, Manraajh took on the role of Harshvardhan in the television series Tumm Se Tumm Tak.

He has also spoken about the importance of inclusivity and diversity in Indian television storytelling.

== Personal life ==
In an interview, Manraajh opened up about coping with the loss of his father, sharing that the grief has deeply influenced his emotional growth as an actor.

== Filmography ==
=== Television and web series ===
Year	Title	Role	Notes
2014	Yeh Dil Sun Raha Hai	Nrigank	Recurring role
2017	Romil & Jugal	Jugal	Main role
2017	Pyaar Tune Kya Kiya	Wasim	Episode role
2018–2019	Kehne Ko Humsafar Hain	Arya	Recurring role
2018	Qayamat Ki Raat	Aman Singh Sooryavanshi	Recurring role
2018	Kaleerein	Sunny Kapoor	Recurring role
2019	Abhay	Rohit	Episode role
2021–2023	Bade Achhe Lagte Hain 2	Shubham Kapoor	Supporting role
2025–present	Tumm Se Tumm Tak	Harshvardhan	
