= Virgin Bhasskar =

Indian web series

- Genre: Web series Drama; Comedy
- Created by: Ekta Kapoor
- Developed by: Balaji Telefilms
- Written by: Ajaydeep Singh; Manish Kumar
- Directed by: Sakshat Dalvi; Sangieta Rao
- Creative director: Baljit Singh Chaddha
- Starring: Anant Joshi; Rutpanna Aishwarya
- Theme music composer: Harshwardhan Dixit
- Country of origin: India
- Original language: Hindi
- No. of seasons: 1
- No. of episodes: 11 (list of episodes)

Production
- Producers: Ekta Kapoor; Shobha Kapoor
- Production locations: Mumbai, Maharashtra, India
- Cinematography: Anubhav Bansal
- Editors: Vikas Sharma; Vishal Sharma
- Camera setup: Multi-camera
- Running time: 18-25 minutes
- Production company: Balaji Telefilms

Original release
- Network: ALT Balaji; ZEE5
- Release: 19 November 2019 (season 1)

Related
- Virgin Bhasskar 2

Virgin Bhasskar is an Indian comedy web series created by Akanksha Shukla and produced by Ekta Kapoor and Shobha Kapoor under their banner Balaji Telefilms for their video-on-demand streaming platform ALT Balaji and ZEE5. The series is directed by Sakshat Dalvi and Sangieta Rao. The season 1 of the series premiered on 19 November 2019 on ZEE5 and season 2 premiered on 29 August 2020.

The series stars Anant V Joshi, Rutpanna Aishwarya Sethi, and Dherendra Kumar Tiwari as protagonists and revolves around the life of an erotic novelist who desperately wants to lose his virginity.

== Synopsis ==
The series revolves around Bhaskar Tripathi who is an erotic novelist but the irony of his life is that he is still a virgin. The series explores his life when he falls in love with Vidhi Pandey, daughter of a police officer and wants to lose his virginity only to her.

== Cast ==
Actor	Role	Appearances
Anant V Joshi	Bhaskar Tripathi	Main
Rutpanna Aishwarya Sethi	Vidhi Pandey	Main
Dherendra Kumar Tiwari	Mishra Ji	Recurring
Himanshu Arora	Rohan	Recurring
Sukhwinder Chahal		Recurring
Omkar Nautiyal	Abhishek Yadav	Recurring
Pradeep Yadav	Dilevariman	Recurring
Durgesh Kumar	Batuknath	Recurring
Ranvierr Chahal	IPS Keshav Tyagi	Recurring

== Episodes ==
Series	Episodes	Originally released		
Series	Episodes	First released	Last released	Network
1	11	19 November 2019	19 November 2019	ALTBalaji

No. overall	No. in season	Title	Directed by	Written by	Original release date
1	1	"Un-used Jawaani"	Sangieta Rao	Ajaydeep Singh and Manish Kumar	19 November 2019
2	2	"The first meeting"	Sangieta Rao	Ajaydeep Singh and Manish Kumar	19 November 2019
3	3	"Banarasi Pyaar Ya Sambhog"	Sangieta Rao	Ajaydeep Singh and Manish Kumar	19 November 2019
4	4	"Saam Daam Dand Bhed"	Sangieta Rao	Ajaydeep Singh and Manish Kumar	19 November 2019
5	5	"Coaching Wali GF"	Sangieta Rao	Ajaydeep Singh and Manish Kumar	19 November 2019
6	6	"Shaadi Mein Samasyaa"	Sangieta Rao	Ajaydeep Singh and Manish Kumar	19 November 2019
7	7	"Baaton Ka Tota"	Sangieta Rao	Ajaydeep Singh and Manish Kumar	19 November 2019
8	8	"Pyaar Ka Saregama"	Sangieta Rao	Ajaydeep Singh and Manish Kumar	19 November 2019
9	9	"Sabse Bada Rog, Bhaiya Nahi Ho Raha Sambhog"	Sangieta Rao	Ajaydeep Singh and Manish Kumar	19 November 2019
10	10	"Chaudah Upanyaas Ka Sahitya"	Sangieta Rao	Ajaydeep Singh and Manish Kumar	19 November 2019
11	11	"Pyaar Ki Vidhi"	Sangieta Rao	Ajaydeep Singh and Manish Kumar	19 November 2019

== Reception ==
The show received mixed reviews on its opening, while audience rated 6.8 stars on IMDb.
