= The Valley (2017 film) =

- Directed by: Saila Kariat
- Written by: Saila Kariat
- Produced by: Saila Kariat; Yumee Jang
- Starring: Alyy Khan; Suchitra Pillai; Jake T. Austin; Samina Peerzada; Barry Corbin; Christa B. Allen; Agneeta Thacker; Salma Khan
- Cinematography: Paul Nordin
- Edited by: Robin Lee
- Music by: Jacob Yoffee
- Production company: Wavefront Productions
- Distributed by: Wavefront Productions
- Release dates: November 14, 2017 (San Diego Asian Film Festival); April 6, 2018 (United States)
- Running time: 95 minutes
- Language: English

The Valley is a 2017 American drama film written and directed by Saila Kariat and starring Alyy Khan, Suchitra Pillai, Jake T. Austin, Samina Peerzada, Barry Corbin, Christa B. Allen, Agneeta Thacker and Salma Khan. The plot follows a distraught father as he searches for answers after his college-age daughter's suicide. The film was released on March 2, 2018.

== Plot ==
The Valley is the story of immigrant entrepreneur Neal Kumar and his family, who live in the technologically driven culture in Silicon Valley. His affluent life appears idyllic from the exterior; however, when his daughter Maya tragically commits suicide, the fractured nature of his interior life becomes apparent to himself and those around him. At the outset, Neal unveils his latest technology, Augur, from his company Virtually You, which emphasizes how technology enhances human connectedness. Sometime later, he drives to a cliff and pulls out a gun. He remembers the events of the past year, when his daughter committed suicide. Afterwards, the family is devastated and does not understand the cause of the tragedy. Neal’s quest to find out the truth propels him on an increasingly frantic journey that brings him to the brink of disaster.

== Cast ==
- Alyy Khan as Neal Kumar
- Suchitra Pillai as Roopa Kumar - wife
- Jake T. Austin as Chris Williams
- Samina Peerzada as Didi - housekeeper
- Barry Corbin as Gary - business colleague
- Christa B. Allen as Alicia - friend
- Agneeta Thacker as Maya - daughter
- Salma Khan as Monica - older daughter

== Production ==
In August 2015, Saila Kariat obtained all financing for The Valley and began forming a team. The crew was assembled mostly from the San Francisco Bay Area, while the cast was multinational. The cast came from Pakistan, India, Los Angeles, and New York City.

Filming began in March 2016 in Silicon Valley, California, and was completed in early April. The entire production was completed in 21 days. Post-production was completed in February 2017, and The Valley premiered at Cinequest Film Festival in March 2017.

== Release ==
The film was released on April 6, 2018, and later in the UK and India for a limited theatrical release.

== Critical response ==
The Valley has been in the festival circuit in 2017, having been in 22 festivals. It has garnered numerous awards, including Best Feature Film (3 festivals), Best Original Screenplay, Best Actress, Best Supporting Actress, Best Original Score, and Best Cinematography.
