= Antha Mana Manchike =

- DVD cover
- Directed by: Veeru K
- Written by: Marudhuri Raja (dialogues)
- Screenplay by: Veeru K
- Story by: Veeru K
- Produced by: Mahesh Rathi; Kishore Rathi (Presents)
- Starring: Rajendra Prasad; Rachana; Asha Saini
- Cinematography: Gadiraju Seenu
- Edited by: V. Nagi Reddy
- Music by: Veeru K
- Production company: Manisha Films
- Release date: 30 July 2000
- Running time: 140 mins
- Country: India
- Language: Telugu

Antha Mana Manchike (transl. Everything for our wellbeing only) is a 2000 Telugu-language comedy film, produced by Mahesh Rathi on Manisha Films banner. It stars Rajendra Prasad, Rachana, Asha Saini and music also composed by Veeru K. The film was recorded as average at the box office.

== Cast ==
- Rajendra Prasad as Jagapathi
- Rachana Banerjee as Urmila
- Asha Saini as Nisha
- Brahmanandam as Abu
- Sudhakar as Babji
- Ali as Pasupati
- Tanikella Bharani as Tirupati
- Nutan Prasad as Judge
- M. S. Narayana as Music Teacher Balu
- Chalapathi Rao as Pichiswara Rao
- Mallikarjuna Rao as Pichiswara Rao's PA
- Costume Krishna as Urmila's father
- Kishore Rathi as Theater Owner
- Gadiraju Subba Rao as Court Amina
- Jenny as Bank Manager
- Kovai Sarala as Sujikutti
- Rama Prabha as Aaya Mandhara
- Yamuna as Urmila's friend
- Siva Parvathi as Pichiswara Rao's wife
- Rajini as Abu's wife
- Kalpana Rai as Principal

== Production ==
Kishore Rathi who previously worked in Manisha films split from the company and started his own production company Manisha Arts and Media Limited. The film was directed by K. Veeru who earlier made Aaropranam.

== Soundtrack ==
Antha Mana Manchike

Film score by Veeru K
- Released: 2000
- Genre: Soundtrack
- Length: 18:53
- Label: His Master's Voice
- Producer: Veeru K

Music composed by Veeru K. Music released on His Master's Voice. The song "Dabichi" marked the debut of Telugu pop singer Smita in films.

No.	Title	Lyrics	Singer(s)	Length
1.	"Vegam Vegam"	Madhuphala	Unni Krishnan, Chitra	3:50
2.	"Baphure Bhama"	Sirivennela Sitarama Sastry	Raju, Ramu, Gopika Poornima, Swarnalatha Jr	4:45
3.	"I Love You"	Sirivennela Sitarama Sastry	Mano, Gopika Poornima	4:06
4.	"Dabuchi Dadam"	Guru Charan	Unni Krishnan, Smita	3:48
5.	"Kalisi Kapuram"	Madhuphala	Chitra	1:17
6.	"Namma Ledamma"	Sirivennela Sitarama Sastry	Chitra	2:10
Total length:				18:53

== Reception ==
Full Hyderabad wrote "There is nothing new about the film but it is still entertaining. You will not get bored. You will only laugh even when the plot goes haywire in the second half". Andhra Today wrote "The movie lacks in a good story, the poor choice of which must only be attributed to the director. Veeru K as director disappoints the audience thoroughly. Despite attempts to steer the movie through a humorous course, there is little comic relief". Telugu Cinema wrote "The thin story line takes exasperating twists making the audience too uncomfortable in their seats. In his frantic move to generate comedy, the director churned out many dramatic and illogical scenes and twists". Indiainfo wrote " On the whole, the movie looks like a hotch-potch of comic scenes with a thin storyline holding them together. The comedy borders on the ludicrous and tells on the minds of viewers. On the music front, there is nothing to write home about".
