= Mastram (TV series) =

Indian erotic drama television series

- Promotional poster
- Genre: Erotic; Drama
- Starring: see Cast section
- Music by: Ashish Chhabra; Ulluminati
- Country of origin: India
- Original language: Hindi
- No. of seasons: 1
- No. of episodes: 10

Production
- Executive producer: Prabhleen Kaur
- Editor: Bhupesh Micky Sharma
- Running time: 30–40 minutes
- Production company: Almighty Motion Picture

Original release
- Network: MX Player
- Release: 30 April 2020

Mastram is a 2020 Indian erotic drama streaming television series on MX Player. It stars Anshuman Jha, Tara Alisha Berry.

== Plot ==
=== Season 1 ===
The story is about Rajaram who is an aspiring writer in the 1980s, living in a remote valley and writing a book that is dismissed as boring. Frustrated, he meets his friend, who takes him to a shady theatre and watches soft porn for the first time in his righteous life. Rajaram exits the theatre with disgust, his friend tells him that this is what public wants to read. Remembering his past experiences, he comes to a conclusion that he will write those stories when going to home via bus. He finds his first character for the story, named Rani, who tried to flirt and seduce him at the same morning, when she enters into the bus he plots a story named "Khali bus ka suhana safar" in his imagination where there is no one except driver, conductor, Rajaram and Rani, by taking advantage he and Rani had sex and enjoyed to its extent. Editor agrees on this story and gives him money. When he was in search of next character, his eyes gets stuck on a college girl named Madhu and he falls in love with her. After then like first story, he recalling his school life, he confessed to his friend that he had sex with a hot teacher named Rita, for which he was beaten by danda. He inspired by this writes second story named "master ji ka danda". Meanwhile, his marriage gets fixed with Madhu, but because of mischief done by his maternal uncle initially it was rejected. Rajaram inspired by his neighbour's sex life writes third story named "mallu aunty ka malmal". At that same night, when Rajaram clarified the situation to Madhu, she comes to Rajaram's home and agrees for marriage. Rajaram handles both the thing his erotic stories and his love life very well. Meanwhile, actress named Indulekha recognises Rajaram as Mastram, when Rajaram meets her as her fan and Mastram's friend. Indulekha agrees with Rajaram to keep his identity secret, but on one condition. When Indulekha was telling condition and shakes hand for approval of condition, one photographer captures photo and gets it published in newspaper. This causes some problems to Mastram in his personal life and love life. Madhu on her friend's suggestion, sends Rajaram to her friend's home to take the test, where both of her friends tries to seduce him, but Rajaram leaves from there with erotic story and its characters in mind. Madhu's friend informs her about good nature of Rajaram, which makes Madhu guilty; meanwhile, Rajaram's friend who was searching for Rajaram to inform him about the plan of Madhu and her friends, finally meets Rajaram after Rajaram leaves Madhu's friend's home and after knowing that Rajaram has been passed in the test without any information of Madhu's plan, tells Rajaram truth, which makes Rajaram upset and he tries to break the relationship formally, but reconciles with Madhu after learning his mistake. They say sorry to each other. In the meantime, some producer wants to meet the first three characters of Mastram, for which he approaches editor of Mastram. Now, editor forces Rajaram to meet the producer in Mumbai and write for him as Mastram. Rajaram departs for Mumbai with Madhu and his other relatives, when he was entering in his compartment, he observes lady ticket checker. After sometime, when lady TC tells him to come into her cabin as his ticket has some date issue and she will correct the problem and give him new ticket. Rajaram gets new story and character in form of lady TC. When he finishes the story, because of his exhaustion, he forgets to hide the pages. Madhu wakes up in the midnight and out of curiosity checks those pages and she realises that Rajaram himself is "Mastram".

== Episodes ==
Series	Episodes	Originally released		
Series	Episodes	First released	Last released	Network
1	10	30 April 2020	30 April 2020	MX Player

=== Season 1 ===
No. overall	No. in season	Title	Directed by	Written by	Original release date
1	1	"Khali Bus Ka Suhana Safar"	Unknown	Aryan Sunil	30 April 2020
2	2	"Master Ji Ka Danda"	Unknown	Aryan Sunil	30 April 2020
3	3	"Mallu Aunty Ka Malmal"	Unknown	Aryan Sunil	30 April 2020
4	4	"Baniye Ka Lollypop"	Unknown	Aryan Sunil	30 April 2020
5	5	"Bua Ke 56 Aasan"	Unknown	Aryan Sunil	30 April 2020
6	6	"Vaibhav Ki Didi"	Unknown	Aryan Sunil	30 April 2020
7	7	"Abhineteri Ka Nirman"	Unknown	Aryan Sunil	30 April 2020
8	8	"Madhu Ki Do Saheliyan"	Unknown	Aryan Sunil	30 April 2020
9	9	"Sonu Ka Joban"	Unknown	Aryan Sunil	30 April 2020
10	10	"All"	Unknown	Aryan Sunil	30 April 2020

== Cast ==
- Anshuman Jha as Rajaram
- Tara Alisha Berry as Madhu
- Jagat Singh Rawat as Mamaji
- Aakash Dabhade as Gopal
- Rani Chatterjee as Rani
- Kenisha Awasthi as Miss Rita
- Aabha Paul as Sarita Nair
- Ashmita Jaggi as Inspector Gayatri "Geetu"
- Garima Jain as Abhinetri Indurekha
- Isha Chhabra as Madhu's Bua
- Amrita Das Gupta as Chhoti Bahu
- Kamalika Chanda as Secretary
- Harshitha Khuswaha as Asha
- Nehal Vadoliya as Nanda
- Vipin Sharma as Durga Prasad
- Ravi Sharma as Vishambar (Madhu's Father)
- Vivek Jha as Golu Dhobi
- Benieal as Benny
