= Kehne Ko Humsafar Hain =

Indian Hindi web series by Ekta Kapoor

- Genre: Romance; Drama
- Created by: Ekta Kapoor
- Written by: Vibha Singh; Jaya Mishra
- Screenplay by: Vibha Singh
- Story by: Neena Gupta
- Directed by: Anil V Kumar; Kapil Sharma
- Creative directors: Jaspreet Kaur Ahuja; Niharika Singh Jadaun
- Starring: See below
- Theme music composer: Amruta Fadnavis
- Ending theme: "Tum Ho Paas..."
- Composer: Ashish Rego
- Country of origin: India
- Original language: Hindi
- No. of seasons: 3
- No. of episodes: 60 (list of episodes)

Production
- Executive producers: Manyata Sood; Ankur Dwivedi
- Producers: Shristi Arya Behl; Goldie Behl
- Editors: Satya Sharma; Sumanth Sharma
- Camera setup: Multi-camera
- Running time: 18–28 minutes
- Production company: Rose Audio Visuals

Original release
- Network: ALTBalaji; ZEE5
- Release: 16 March 2018

Kehne Ko Humsafar Hain is an Indian Hindi web series produced by Shristi Arya Behl and Goldie Behl for Ekta Kapoor's video on demand platforms ZEE5 and ALTBalaji. The series stars actors Ronit Roy, Mona Singh, and Gurdeep Kohli.

This series was launched on Zee5 on 25 March 2020 as a substitute for the Zee TV shows whose broadcast had to be stopped by the channel due to the COVID-19 pandemic.

== Plot ==
=== Season 1 ===
Rohit Mehra, a chartered accountant is married to Poonam for twenty-two years and have two daughters named Bani and Nikki. On the surface, they are a happy couple. But Rohit has an affair with Ananya Sharma, an interior designer. They meet privately and carefully keep their relationship under wraps. However, the secret is soon discovered. The family is torn apart, and Rohit's kids start loathing Ananya. Torn between a loyal wife and lover, Rohit decides to divorce Poonam and legitimize his relationship with Ananya through marriage. After several arguments, Rohit and Poonam are legally separated, and he marries Ananya.

Shortly after her marriage, Bani, Rohit's elder daughter hits depression due to her unhappiness in her marital life. Rohit goes back to his family to extend his support to his daughter through this difficult phase. This makes Ananya insecure, leading to everyday chaos at home. She feels neglected by Rohit who is still deeply connected with his former wife and children. Upset at the turn of events, she writes a letter for Rohit and leaves the house.

=== Season 2 ===
Upon reading Ananya's letter, Rohit feels betrayed as he had left his family for her. He goes out on a search and fails to locate her. Soon, he learns that she is in Doha, and immediately takes off to make it up to her. After several tries, he convinces her to come back to India, where they set up a new life together. Everything goes back to normal again. However, Rohit's first wife Poonam starts dating a young man named Abhimanyu.

In subsequent episodes, Bani realizes that she had never loved her husband and wants to divorce him. Meanwhile Rohit hits a financial crisis but keeps Ananya out of the matter. Ananya learns of this through Poonam who unintentionally spills it out. She feels hurt that Rohit never felt comfortable to share his troubles with her. On the other hand, Poonam is uncomfortable with the love she is receiving from Abhimanyu. She is going through a difficult period of having a menopause, which has made her emotionally unstable. Eventually she comes to Rohit for help, and they end up having a one-night stand. Poonam tells Rohit not to let Ananya know of the incident, as she would be very upset and end their relationship.

On Christmas Eve, a pregnant Ananya discovers the truth at a party. Rohit tries to explain, but a furious Ananya is adamant. She decides to not disclose to Rohit about her pregnancy, and immediately leaves for Doha, heartbroken.

=== Season 3 ===
It has been four years since Ananya left Rohit. She has a three-year-old son, Kabir and still lives in Qatar. Meanwhile, Rohit has turned into a drunkard and philanderer.

One day, Ananya learns that her company in India, which she had given to Bani has hit a rough patch. She comes back to India and after a confrontation with Bani, decides to fix the issue with her. She meets everyone, including Rohit, that leads to an altercation. She makes up her mind for divorce but Rohit bluntly refuses.

Rohit and Poonam's younger daughter Nikki's marriage gets fixed. On the day of the wedding, the police arrives at the venue and arrests Rohit for allegedly kidnapping a lady' young daughter, who turns out to be the girl he is dating. Everyone tries to get him out of jail in time for the wedding, but the police refuses to give him bail. On the day of Nikki's marriage, Rohit confesses to his family that he had indeed married the girl he was dating. Everyone is shocked. Ananya feels sad and wants to leave.

Next morning, the daughter's mother comes to arrest Rohit again. She tells her daughter that the couple cannot be married since Rohit is her sister's husband. It is revealed that the woman is Ananya's mother, who had left her in a foster home when she was a baby. Her mother provided a huge amount of money to pay for Ananya's expenses but never met her. Ananya lived her life alone without parents and siblings which is why she has been so broken. The girl, in front of everyone, accepts that Rohit helped her in this matter because he loves Ananya so much. And that she and Rohit were not married. She then leaves.

Ananya misses her flight and decides to live in India with her family. She goes to meet Rohit with her son Kabir. He apologizes for everything and wants another chance, but she refuses to reconcile.

At last, they get divorced. After separation, Rohit comes to meet her. In a flashback, she says "I don't want my husband back. I want the man I love, Rohit, when we had great loving memories".

== Cast ==
- Ronit Roy as Rohit Mehra (seasons 1–3): Poonam's ex-husband and Ananya's lover-turned-husband
- Mona Singh as Ananya Sharma (seasons 1–3): Rohit's lover, later his wife
- Gurdeep Kohli as Poonam Kapoor Mehra (seasons 1–3): Rohit's ex-wife and Abhimanyu's wife
- Pooja Banerjee as Bani Mehra (seasons 1–3): Rohit and Poonams' elder daughter
- Palak Jain as Nikki Mehra (seasons 1–3): Rohit and Poonam's younger daughter
- Apurva Agnihotri as Harry Somani (seasons 1–3): Ananya's boss
- Sandeep Nahar as Guri (seasons 1–3): Rohit's best friend
- Rani Jha as Vandy (seasons 1–3): Ananya's friend
- Manraj Singh as Arya (seasons 1–2): Bani's husband
- Parth Samthaan as Faizal Alghazi (Season 2): Bani's love interest
- Sayush Sanjay Nayyar as Abhimanyu (seasons 2–3): Poonam's second husband
- Suchitra Pillai as Sheena (seasons 1–3): Poonam's sister
- Aditi Vasudev as Amaira (Season 3): Ananya's half-sister
- Ivan Rodrigues as Paritosh (Season 3): Amaira's father
- Anjum Fakih as Nisha (Season 3)
- Sharon Prabhakar as Mrinalini (Season 3): Ananya and Amairas' mother

== Episodes ==
=== Season 1 ===
No. overall	No. in season	Title	Directed by	Written by	Original release date
1	1	"He Loves Me, He Loves Me Not"	Anil V Kumar, Kapil Sharma	Vibha Singh, Jaya Mishra	16 March 2018
2	2	"Memories Magic And Madness"	Anil V Kumar, Kapil Sharma	Vibha Singh, Jaya Mishra	16 March 2018
3	3	"Desperate Love, Guilty Hearts"	Anil V Kumar, Kapil Sharma	Vibha Singh, Jaya Mishra	16 March 2018
4	4	"Who Am I To You?"	Anil V Kumar, Kapil Sharma	Vibha Singh, Jaya Mishra	16 March 2018
5	5	"Stolen Love"	Anil V Kumar, Kapil Sharma	Vibha Singh, Jaya Mishra	19 March 2018
6	6	"Always An Outsider"	Anil V Kumar, Kapil Sharma	Vibha Singh, Jaya Mishra	21 March 2018
7	7	"The Wife's Challenge"	Anil V Kumar, Kapil Sharma	Vibha Singh, Jaya Mishra	23 March 2018
8	8	"Mine Forever"	Anil V Kumar, Kapil Sharma	Vibha Singh, Jaya Mishra	26 March 2018
9	9	"Love Or 'Tug-O'-War'"	Anil V Kumar, Kapil Sharma	Vibha Singh, Jaya Mishra	28 March 2018
10	10	"J For Jealousy"	Anil V Kumar, Kapil Sharma	Vibha Singh, Jaya Mishra	30 March 2018
11	11	"Trials And Tribulations"	Anil V Kumar, Kapil Sharma	Vibha Singh, Jaya Mishra	2 April 2018
12	12	"Crossing Boundaries"	Anil V Kumar, Kapil Sharma	Vibha Singh, Jaya Mishra	4 April 2018
13	13	"Home Alone"	Anil V Kumar, Kapil Sharma	Vibha Singh, Jaya Mishra	6 April 2018
14	14	"New Beginnings Old Ghosts"	Anil V Kumar, Kapil Sharma	Vibha Singh, Jaya Mishra	9 April 2018
15	15	"Nothing Lasts Forever"	Anil V Kumar, Kapil Sharma	Vibha Singh, Jaya Mishra	11 April 2018

=== Season 2 ===
No. overall	No. in season	Title	Directed by	Written by	Original release date
16	1	"Love, Loss and Lingering Memories"	Anil V Kumar, Kapil Sharma	Vibha Singh, Jaya Mishra	14 February 2019
17	2	"Sleepless in Qatar"	Anil V Kumar, Kapil Sharma	Vibha Singh, Jaya Mishra	14 February 2019
18	3	"Sukoon"	Anil V Kumar, Kapil Sharma	Vibha Singh, Jaya Mishra	14 February 2019
19	4	"Fifty Fifty"	Anil V Kumar, Kapil Sharma	Vibha Singh, Jaya Mishra	14 February 2019
20	5	"Nothing Changes But You"	Anil V Kumar, Kapil Sharma	Vibha Singh, Jaya Mishra	18 February 2019
21	6	"Fool's Paradise"	Anil V Kumar, Kapil Sharma	Vibha Singh, Jaya Mishra	20 February 2019
22	7	"The Dirty Secret"	Anil V Kumar, Kapil Sharma	Vibha Singh, Jaya Mishra	22 February 2019
23	8	"Web of Lies"	Anil V Kumar, Kapil Sharma	Vibha Singh, Jaya Mishra	25 February 2019
24	9	"Cold War and Red Roses"	Anil V Kumar, Kapil Sharma	Vibha Singh, Jaya Mishra	27 February 2019
25	10	"Same Same But Different"	Anil V Kumar, Kapil Sharma	Vibha Singh, Jaya Mishra	1 March 2019
26	11	"A secret to keep"	Anil V Kumar, Kapil Sharma	Vibha Singh, Jaya Mishra	4 March 2019
27	12	"The Speed Dial Girl"	Anil V Kumar, Kapil Sharma	Vibha Singh, Jaya Mishra	6 March 2019
28	13	"Fast and the Furious"	Anil V Kumar, Kapil Sharma	Vibha Singh, Jaya Mishra	8 March 2019
29	14	"Like Father Like Daughter"	Anil V Kumar, Kapil Sharma	Vibha Singh, Jaya Mishra	11 March 2019
30	15	"Parallel Universes"	Anil V Kumar, Kapil Sharma	Vibha Singh, Jaya Mishra	13 March 2019
31	16	"The Plot Thickens"	Anil V Kumar, Kapil Sharma	Vibha Singh, Jaya Mishra	15 March 2019
32	17	"Of Foes and Friends"	Anil V Kumar, Kapil Sharma	Vibha Singh, Jaya Mishra	18 March 2019
33	18	"The Past Beckons"	Anil V Kumar, Kapil Sharma	Vibha Singh, Jaya Mishra	20 March 2019
34	19	"Spilling the Beans"	Anil V Kumar, Kapil Sharma	Vibha Singh, Jaya Mishra	22 March 2019
35	20	"Sea of Secrets"	Anil V Kumar, Kapil Sharma	Vibha Singh, Jaya Mishra	25 March 2019
36	21	"Broken Heart Never Heals"	Anil V Kumar, Kapil Sharma	Vibha Singh, Jaya Mishra	27 March 2019
37	22	"Karma Destiny and the Circle of Life"	Anil V Kumar, Kapil Sharma	Vibha Singh, Jaya Mishra	29 March 2019
38	23	"Silence and the Silenced"	Anil V Kumar, Kapil Sharma	Vibha Singh, Jaya Mishra	1 April 2019
38	24	"New Year, Old Lies"	Anil V Kumar, Kapil Sharma	Vibha Singh, Jaya Mishra	3 April 2019
40	25	"Tell Tale"	Anil V Kumar, Kapil Sharma	Vibha Singh, Jaya Mishra	5 April 2019
41	26	"What Goes Around Comes Around"	Anil V Kumar, Kapil Sharma	Vibha Singh, Jaya Mishra	5 April 2019

=== Season 3 ===
No. overall	No. in season	Title	Directed by	Written by	Original release date
42	1	"Hearts of Stone"	Anil V Kumar, Kapil Sharma	Vibha Singh, Jaya Mishra	6 June 2020
43	2	"Lambi Judai"	Anil V Kumar, Kapil Sharma	Vibha Singh, Jaya Mishra	6 June 2020
44	3	"This Hearts a Mess"	Anil V Kumar, Kapil Sharma	Vibha Singh, Jaya Mishra	6 June 2020
45	4	"Hello Stranger! Missed Me?"	Anil V Kumar, Kapil Sharma	Vibha Singh, Jaya Mishra	6 June 2020
46	5	"Mard Ko Dard Nahi Hota"	Anil V Kumar, Kapil Sharma	Vibha Singh, Jaya Mishra	6 June 2020
47	6	"The Aftermath"	Anil V Kumar, Kapil Sharma	Vibha Singh, Jaya Mishra	6 June 2020
48	7	"A Mistake, That's What I Am"	Anil V Kumar, Kapil Sharma	Vibha Singh, Jaya Mishra	6 June 2020
49	8	"Double Trouble"	Anil V Kumar, Kapil Sharma	Vibha Singh, Jaya Mishra	6 June 2020
50	9	"Moving on with a Ring!"	Anil V Kumar, Kapil Sharma	Vibha Singh, Jaya Mishra	6 June 2020
51	10	"The Proposal"	Anil V Kumar, Kapil Sharma	Vibha Singh, Jaya Mishra	6 June 2020
52	11	"Har Fikr Ko Dhuein Mein Udhata"	Anil V Kumar, Kapil Sharma	Vibha Singh, Jaya Mishra	1 July 2020
53	12	"Small Flames = Big Fire"	Anil V Kumar, Kapil Sharma	Vibha Singh, Jaya Mishra	1 July 2020
54	13	"Hit And Run"	Anil V Kumar, Kapil Sharma	Vibha Singh, Jaya Mishra	1 July 2020
55	14	"The Ugly Truth"	Anil V Kumar, Kapil Sharma	Vibha Singh, Jaya Mishra	1 July 2020
56	15	"Where There Is Smoke, There Is Fire"	Anil V Kumar, Kapil Sharma	Vibha Singh, Jaya Mishra	1 July 2020
57	16	"Band Baaja Qaidkhaana"	Anil V Kumar, Kapil Sharma	Vibha Singh, Jaya Mishra	1 July 2020
58	17	"Shaadi-Vyaah, Jail-Shail"	Anil V Kumar, Kapil Sharma	Vibha Singh, Jaya Mishra	1 July 2020
59	18	"Gone Girl"	Anil V Kumar, Kapil Sharma	Vibha Singh, Jaya Mishra	1 July 2020
60	19	"Control-Shift-Restart"	Anil V Kumar, Kapil Sharma	Vibha Singh, Jaya Mishra	1 July 2020

== Reception ==
Mid-Day gave the series 4.5 stars and said, "High on emotions, Kehne Ko Humsafar Hain has a relatable story where life is not only about kitchen politics, or hacking an over-imaginative plan to kill someone or weeping all the time."

Box Office India gave the show 4 stars and wrote, "Amid the regressive plots present in abundance in the Indian television industry, Kehne Ko Humsafar Hain gives a fresh story line, while talking about the reality of relationships and their conflicts. The struggle that the male protagonist faces to balance both aspects of his life with sensitivity promises to be interesting."
