= Kyra Dutt =

Indian actress and model

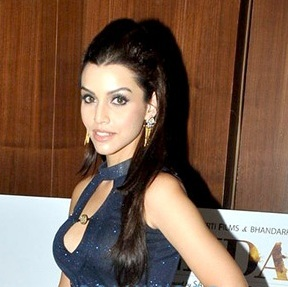
- Dutt in 2015
- Born: Debi Dutta; Kolkata, West Bengal, India
- Education: Unknown
- Occupations: Actress; Model
- Years active: 2009 - Present
- Spouse: Sonam Makkar

Debi Dutta better known by her stage name Kyra Dutt is an Indian actress and model who primarily appears in Hindi films. She was one of the models of the famous Kingfisher Calendar in 2013.

She made her debut in a small role beside Ranbir Kapoor in Rocket Singh: Salesman of the Year (2009) and appeared in a special song for the film Mere Brother Ki Dulhan (2011). Later she appeared as a female lead in the film Calendar Girls (2015).

She is quite popular in the Telugu audience for her song "Boochade Boochade", from the film Race Gurram.

== Early life ==
Kyra Dutt was born in Kolkata. She did her schooling from La Martiniere Calcutta.

== Career (2009-present) ==
Kyra has been featured in brands such as Kingfisher, Mercedes, Thums Up, Close-up, HCL Laptop, Wild Stone Deo etc.

Kyra appeared in a small role beside Ranbir Kapoor in Rocket Singh: Salesman of the Year (2009) and later appeared in several special songs in South Indian films. Then she appeared as a female lead in Calendar Girls (2015). Later she signed a contract with Balaji Telefilms, under which she appeared in XXX.

In 2016 she appeared in a T-Series single titled "Party Animals", which became quite popular.

In February 2017, due to the delay in releasing the film XXX she ended her contract with the Balaji Telefilms. Later she appeared in a short film titled Lonely Girl, which was aired directly on YouTube on 23 February 2017. Later in early June 2017, she signed to do a special appearance song in Puri Jagannadh's Paisa Vasool, a Telugu film, but ended up playing a role of ACP Kiranmai, who works as a bar dancer incognito.

In the year 2018, she was signed as the cover for FFACE Fashion Calendar.

== Filmography ==
Year	Film	Role	Language	Notes
2009	Rocket Singh: Salesman of the Year	Aparna	Hindi	
2010	Baana Kaathadi		Tamil	Special appearance
2011	Udhayan		Tamil	Special appearance
2011	Mankatha		Tamil	Special appearance
2011	Mere Brother Ki Dulhan		Hindi	Special appearance
2012	Thadaiyara Thaakka		Tamil	Special appearance
2012	Eppadi Manasukkul Vanthai		Tamil	Special appearance
2014	Race Gurram		Telugu	Special appearance in a song "Boochade Boochade"
2015	Calendar Girls	Sharon Pinto	Hindi	
2016	Zulfiqar	Albeena Ahmed	Bengali	
2017	Lonely Girl		Hindi	Short Film
2017	Paisa Vasool	ACP Kiranmai	Telugu	
2018	XXX	Kaiyra / Mayra	Hindi	Web series
2018	Ego		Telugu	Special appearance in song

== Discography ==
=== Singles ===
No.	Single	Label	Released
1	"Party Animals"	T-Series	9 May 2016
