= Romil and Jugal =

- Genre: Drama
- Created by: Ekta Kapoor
- Based on: Romeo and Juliet
- Developed by: Ekta Kapoor
- Screenplay by: Anu Menon; James Ruzicka; Dialogues; Ishita Moitra
- Story by: Raj Routh
- Directed by: Nupur Asthana
- Creative director: Nimisha Pandey
- Starring: Rajeev Siddhartha; Manraj Singh
- Composer: Rooshin Kaizad
- Country of origin: India
- Original language: Hindi
- No. of seasons: 1
- No. of episodes: 10

Production
- Producers: Ekta Kapoor; Shobha Kapoor
- Production locations: Mumbai, India
- Editor: Geeta Singh
- Camera setup: Multi-camera
- Running time: 19-25 minutes
- Production company: Balaji Telefilms

Original release
- Network: ALT Balaji
- Release: 16 April 2017

Romil and Jugal is an Indian Hindi web series, produced by Ekta Kapoor for ALTBalaji. It stars Rajeev Siddhartha and Manraj Singh in lead roles. The series follows two young gay men, and the way the society treat them.

The series was made available for streaming on the ALT Balaji App and its associated websites.

== Plot ==
The series concerns two modern men who fall in love with each other. Jugal, a Tamil-Brahman boy, is a little bit shy but falls in love with Romil, a Punjabi hunk and playboy. After spending time and navigating life together, they successfully become accepted by their narrow minded society. Their orthodox family also becomes more aware. They understand that their relationship is completely genuine and that they can't live without each other. They end up being accepted as a couple by both the general society and their families, but...

== Cast ==
- Rajeev Siddhartha as Romil Kohli
- Manraj Singh as Jugal Subramaniam
- Shrishti Ganguly Rindani as Ramya Subramaniam
- Mandira Bedi as Ahalya
- Vritika Ramnani as Meher
- Suchitra Pillai as Bhagyalaxmi Subramaniam
- Bhuvnesh Shetty as Sridhar Subramaniam
- Manini Mishra as Sunita Kohli
- Harssh A. Singh as Rajinder Kohli
- Mudita Shauq as Dimple Kohli
- Hariman Dhanjal as Mehul
- Rohan Mehra as Amit
- Divina Thakur as Kenny Desai

== Episodes ==
Though the series is originally shot in Hindi, its available as dubbed versions in three languages ; Malayalam, Tamil and Telugu.

No.	Title	Original release date
1	"Love at first sight"	16 April 2017
Ramya narrates the story of Romil and Jugal to Ahalya.In a small town of Colwynganj, Rosie is excited to get intimate with Jugal. Jugal refuses Rosey as he is a gay and a frustrated Rosey pushes him in the pool of water.
2	"The New Guy Next Door"	16 April 2017
3	"Three Words Dear Romeo..."	16 April 2017
4	"A Kiss And A Punch"	16 April 2017
Ramya explains Jugal has tried to come out many times but her family ignored him . Ramya is in love with Romil. Jugal goes a trip with Romil worrying Mehul as he could break his heart. The book club ladies bunk the book club and join Sunitha's party. In the trip, Jugal kisses Romil for which Romil thrashes Jugal.
5	"Dream Or Reality?"	16 April 2017
Jugal returns from the trip to home. Jugal's dad warns him to stay away from Romil. Romil kisses Jugal as he realised his feelings for men. Sunitha befriends Subramaniyam whereas Bhagyalakshmi befriends Rajinder. Jugal takes Romil to a private place.
6	"Virgins No More!"	16 April 2017
Romil and Jugal have sex. Mr and Mrs Kohli and Subramaniyam have a dinner. Mehul worries as she secretly likes Jugal. Ramya flirts with Romil but Romil rejects her saying he is in love with someone else. Sunitha reads the messages of Romil and Jugal and assumes that her son is in love with Rosie.
7	"Truth and Lies"	16 April 2017
Romil and Rosey perform well their stage roles as Romeo and Juliet impressing their parents to give a shot to their relation. Ramya learns the truth about Romil and Jugal. Jugal decides to reveal the truth to their parents and insists Jugal to do the same. Ramya begs Romil to tell the truth later but Jugal drops the truth. Enraged about this, Jugal's parents disown him. Romil accepts the marriage proposal of Romil and Rosy disappointing Jugal.
8	"In Love And War"	16 April 2017
Jugal stays with Mehul. Mr.Kohli invites Mr and Mrs Subramaniyam to the engagement of Romil and Rosey. Frustrated Subramaniyam reveals the truth that Romil is a gay.In the fear of acceptance, Romil rejects Jugal and accepts to marry Rosey. Romil breaks up with Jugal and avoids him. Their families celebrate the relationship. Frustrated Ramya stands for Jugal and calls Romil a coward to accept the truth and if he marries Rosey, he would be spoiling her life. Feeling sorry for Jugal, Romil tries to console Jugal but Jugal calls him a coward. Estranged Romil decides to have sex with Rosey and visits her house. He couldn't do it and reveals her the truth. Angered, her father thrashes him outside. Romil reveals the truth to his family. Romil and Jugal mend their relationship and kiss in public. Their families involve in a quarrel publicly and create a public nuisance. Romil and Jugal bail their parents but still they refuse them.
9	"Thus with a kiss I die"	16 April 2017
10	"A Happy Ending Not"	16 April 2017
