= Who's Your Daddy? (2020 TV series) =

Indian webseries by Chirag Arora on Zee5

- Season 1 poster
- Genre: Drama; Comedy
- Created by: ALTBalaji
- Written by: Chirag Arora & Jatin Dua
- Story by: Chirag Arora
- Directed by: Chirag Arora
- Creative director: Sheetal Kolvalkar
- Country of origin: India
- Original language: Hindi
- No. of seasons: 2
- No. of episodes: 23

Production
- Producers: Mitesh Hansa Jethva and Ekta Kapoor
- Cinematography: Amit Singh
- Production companies: Zee Entertainment Enterprises; Balaji Telefilms

Original release
- Network: ALTBalaji; ZEE5
- Release: 2 April – 22 December 2020

Who's Your Daddy? is Indian Hindi-language suspense, comedy and drama-based web television series directed by Chirag Arora. The series season 1 was released on 2 April 2020 and the season 2 was released on 29 December 2020. Both seasons were digitally released on ALTBalaji and ZEE5 platform. The web series season 1 is written by Chirag Arora and Jatin Dua while the season 2 has written by Ajaydeep Singh and Jatin Dua.

Season 1 web series starring Rahul Dev, YouTuber Harsh Beniwal, Nikhil Bhambri and Anveshi Jain. Produced by Mitesh Hansa Jethva under the production company name Zee Entertainment Enterprises. Season 2 web series starring Bhavin Bhanushali, Sameeksha Sud, YouTuber Anushka Sharma, Mamik Singh and Vidya Malvade. Produced by Ekta Kapoor under the production company name Balaji Telefilms.

== Synopsis ==
Season 1

This comedy-drama web series showcase Prem Singh (Rahul Dev) & Soggy (Harsh Beniwal) as a father-son couple. Both of them stays in the location of Delhi depicting the daily adventures activities of Soggy & retired army Prem Singh like they are the coolest family in the town. Soggy owns a DVD shop & rents blue films (porn movies) to high society females and earns a sizeable income. This makes his father a star among the women who rent the DVDs. Amidst this whole chaos, nobody knows Who is the daddy of Soggy's son?

Season 2

A tumultuous journey of Shoosha (Bhavin Bhanushali), a small-town orphaned boy, who is trying to make it on his own in life and during this journey he discovers his odd parents. He falls in love with a girl called Sukoon (Sameeksha Sud) and later finds out that her father could also be his long lost father. A lot of humor and drama ensues during this whirlwind journey and at the end the mystery unfolds about shoosha's real father & mother and what happens to the love of his life.

== Cast ==
Season 1

- Rahul Dev as Prem Singh
- Harsh Beniwal as Soggy, son of Prem Singh
- Harsh k as Abhi
- Anveshi Jain as Ms. Chhibber
- Nirmal Rishi as Biji, Mother of Prem Singh
- Lizaa Malik as Mrs. Pammi
- Kasturi Banerjee as Mrs. Das
- Divinaa Thackur as Mehak

Season 2

- Bhavin Bhanushali as Shoosha
- Sameeksha Sud as Sukoon Bagga
- Lata Shukla as Jhai Ji (Batto) Manju Bagga
- Anushka Sharma as Kittu Bijli
- Heer Kaur as Anukriti
- Mamik Singh as Mohak Bagga
- Vidya Malvade as Monika Bagga
- Kartik Sabharwal as Imraan Siddique
- Akashdeep Sabir as Tej Bijli (Jaggi)
- Ashok Awasthi as Lovely
- Sukesh Anand as Raju Mishra
- Mohit Duseja as Apporva Mishra (Appu)
- Navneet Srivastava as Balvinder (Balls)
- Deepika Khanna as Pinky

== Episodes ==
Series	Episodes	Originally released
1	12	2 April 2020
2	11	22 December 2020

=== Season 1 (April 2020) ===
No. overall	No. in season	Title	Directed by	Written by	Original release date
1	1	"Tu Janta Nahi Teri Maa Kaun Hai"	Chirag Arora	Chirag Arora & Jatin Dua	2 April 2020
Soggy takes a trip down his past when Tidda asks Soggy questions about his origin. The nostalgic trip brings out a series of quirky adventures and characters in the series. Soggy had a CD business and a love life to take care off. See how Soggy handled his love-life and the CD business simultaneously. Also, check out the episode to know if Tidda finds his answers through this trip down the memory lane.
2	2	"Nahana Hai?"	Chirag Arora	Chirag Arora & Jatin Dua	2 April 2020
Soggy manages to clear the misunderstanding with Mehak but again gets caught in a new problem. Soggy gets a new responsibility from Chibber, Das, and Pammi. However, the broken delivery system causes trouble. This is when Soggy realizes he needs to have a new delivery partner. How will Soggy solve this problem? Will his handsome Dad Prem help him find the solution?
3	3	"Emotion Nikal Gaya Kya!"	Chirag Arora	Chirag Arora & Jatin Dua	2 April 2020
Prem agrees to help Soggy in running his business successfully. All this is decided at Chibber's place. However, will Prem be helping Soggy in his business or is there a hidden agenda which no one can see? Goldie insults Soggy at a birthday party in Mehak's presence. Will this affect their relationship?
4	4	"You Are My Soniya"	Chirag Arora	Chirag Arora & Jatin Dua	2 April 2020
Chibber, Das, and Pammi offer to get a yearly membership. However, they put a condition to do this. Meanwhile, Soggy plans to convince his father for delivering the CDs to Trio's residence. What will happen at Das's clinic when Prem delivers the CD?
5	5	"Kudi Virgin Nahi!"	Chirag Arora	Chirag Arora & Jatin Dua	2 April 2020
Soggy has been given duty at Mikkas's wedding. Soggy picks up Mehak and her friends to drop them at another wedding on the way. Prem decides to deliver the CDs to Chibber which he ordered. What happens next?
6	6	"Triple Siyapa"	Chirag Arora	Chirag Arora & Jatin Dua	2 April 2020
Prem spends a night with the trio all drunk. Soggy's shop is vandalized by Pissu and his gang for which they get arrested. Pissu thinks of an idea at the police station to get back at Soggy. Prem and his trio are getting ready for the secret party.
7	7	"Aaj Ki Raat Kuch Hone Ko Hai!"	Chirag Arora	Chirag Arora & Jatin Dua	29 April 2020
Mehak and soggy enjoy a day out together, while Mehak asks Soggy to meet her family. On the other hand, Prem is enjoying the secret party with his trio and Das tries hard to impress Prem Singh.
8	8	"Hisaab Barabar"	Chirag Arora	Chirag Arora & Jatin Dua	29 April 2020
Chibber and Prem Singh enjoy the heart to heart conversation. Meanwhile, Das is upset seeing Chibber getting along well with Prem and they end up fighting. The night changes Prem's opinion about the trio and Soggy's family gets ready to meet Mehak's family.
9	9	"Sabka Katega"	Chirag Arora	Chirag Arora & Jatin Dua	29 April 2020
On one hand, Soggy's family meets Mehak's family while Soggy has to leave for completing an urgent job. He gets arrested by the cop, thanks to Pissu's tip. Chibber pulls a few strings to get Soggy released and Soggy gets to know about Mehak's engagement.
10	10	"Mummy Mil Gayi"	Chirag Arora	Chirag Arora & Jatin Dua	29 April 2020
Pammi delivers the divorce notice when Soggy and Prem are marrying their partners. Pammi thanks Prem Singh for all his support throughout, however, asks him to come clean with Chibber about Das.
11	11	"Tu Janta Nahi Tera Baap Kaun Hai"	Chirag Arora	Chirag Arora & Jatin Dua	29 April 2020
Chibber confronts Prem Singh about Das, and Soggy finds an upsetting truth about Sonia's pregnancy. Amidst this chaos, will Chibber-Prem Singh and Soggy-Sonia get married? Will Tidda get acquainted with his mother?
12	12	"Pata Chalega Who's My Daddy"	Chirag Arora	Chirag Arora & Jatin Dua	29 April 2020
Prem Singh and Soggy are tied in a lifelong responsibility. Tidda learns about his mother and is left teary-eyed. What will be the future of Soggy, Prem Singh and Tidda? See what happens next.

=== Season 2 (December 2020) ===
No. overall	No. in season	Title	Directed by	Written by	Original release date
13	1	"Main Shoo Gaya Tey Shaa Aaya"	Chirag Arora	Chirag Arora & Jatin Dua	22 December 2020
Shoosha is a pizza delivery guy, a masseur, and a college student all at once. Balwinder, his best friend and roommate works with him at the same spa as Shoosha. Shoosha meets Sukoon at his new college. Krutika takes a special interest in Shoosha, who is also Sukoon's arch-rival.
14	2	"Monica, Oh My Darling!"	Chirag Arora	Chirag Arora & Jatin Dua	22 December 2020
Sukoon feels bad for Shoosha and sympathizes with him. She invites him to her parents' marriage anniversary celebration. Shoosha is shocked to see Sukoon's father.
15	3	"Aapko Uncle Bulaaon Ya Daddy?"	Chirag Arora	Chirag Arora & Jatin Dua	22 December 2020
Shoosha's claim confuses Mohak, Monica and Sukoon. Mohak's attempt to calm down Monica also goes in vain. Sukoon makes a plan for Shoosha to help him find his mother, Anamika.
16	4	"Par Main Aaya Kahan Se?"	Chirag Arora	Chirag Arora & Jatin Dua	22 December 2020
Sukoon already planned to help Shoosha find his mother. In the next step, Sukoon and Shoosha decide to give Imran a visit to find Anamika. Shoosha learns new things about his mother but his father's identity is still concealed. On the other hand, Krutika teams up with Appu to create a rift between Sukoon and Shoosha.
17	5	"Happy Passport Wala Birthday"	Chirag Arora	Chirag Arora & Jatin Dua	22 December 2020
Mohak and Monica are facing issues with their relationship. Sukoon and Shoosha are busy finding more clues for another potential father. Krutika, on the other hand, is planning to expose Shoosha's dark side. Appu insists Sukoon attend Krutika's party.
18	6	"Kal Raat Ke Liye Thank You"	Chirag Arora	Chirag Arora & Jatin Dua	22 December 2020
Anukriti helps Shoosha to escape from the party unaware of Krutika's trap. Mohak is pleading Monica to return home, while Shoosha and Sukoon visit a hacker to find details about TJ.
19	7	"Kundaliyaan, Taare Aur Numbers"	Chirag Arora	Chirag Arora & Jatin Dua	22 December 2020
Krutika goes to Sukoon's house to collect DNA samples for the test. The hacker helps Shoosha with the lead of a woman and Shoosha and Sukoon visit the lady to know more about TJ. However, it does not lead them anywhere.
20	8	"I Love You, Shoosha"	Chirag Arora	Chirag Arora & Jatin Dua	22 December 2020
Krutika finally manages to create distance between Sukoon and Shoosha. Later, she goes through Shoosha's possession and finds a photograph that shocks her.
21	9	"Sex Ka Sex, Yoga Ka Yoga"	Chirag Arora	Chirag Arora & Jatin Dua	22 December 2020
Shoosha and the Baggas are caught in a bad phase and things change completely. Monica leaves the house after she finds out about the DNA results. Shoosha plans on leaving the town after falling for fabricated proofs.
22	10	"Meri Aakhiri Delivery"	Chirag Arora	Chirag Arora & Jatin Dua	22 December 2020
Balwinder and Anukriti are finding the person that is responsible for doing the DNA goof-up. Shoosha delivers Batto's parcel by visiting Lovely, where Lovely reveals important information about Shoosha's mother. On the contrary, he also has the answer to Shoosha's question.
23	11	"Shooshe... Ye Raha Tera Daddy"	Chirag Arora	Chirag Arora & Jatin Dua	22 December 2020
Shoosha finally ends the quest when all the confusion is over and he finds his Dad. Krutika realizes her mistake and apologises for her hurtful behaviour. Everyone starts afresh and it's all back to normal.

== Reception ==
=== Critical reception ===
Season 1

Pradeep Kamadana of Envoy web gave a review that it is a breezy comedy and a must-watch series. Rahul Dev showed good performance without spoiling the appearance. Harsh Beniwal, Anveshi Jain and Divinaa Thackur did extremely well & justified their performances. The writer and director Chirag Arora had done a great job for thoroughly enjoyable series. On the other hand, he criticized that if there was subtitle provided for Punjabi slang could have reached to more audiences.

Binged has given 5/10 stars on their platform stating that it is partly enjoyable. Criticized that screenplay is inconsistent and narration was superfluous. But also highlighted that the performances of Rahul Dev and Nirmal Rishi were good, the story idea was amazing and the steady humorous sequences.

Pakaao team has given 3/5 stars on their platform stating that it is watchable. The acting of Rahul Dev was great & Harsh Beniwal proved to be a perfect match for Soggy. Cinematography, special effects & editing could have a better scope of improvement. But the direction was nicely done by the director.

Season 2

Binged has given 1/10 star on their platform stating that it is "The Daddy of All Cringe fests". Criticized that screenplay and writing are without purpose or direction, story is terrible which does not make sense. Performance of all the actors are weak and not given any justice. Also the casting selection were poor.

Aparna Hajiris of LetsOTT has given 1/5 star stating that it is "As pointless as blunt pencil". Actors Harmeet Mamik & Vidya Malavade had saved the web series with some performance and their chemistry was good. The script writing didn't make any impact. The screenplay and production quality are not up to the standards as compared to any other Zee5 or AltBalaji show.

Tannavi Sharma of Leisurebyte gave an overall 0.5/5 stars stating that "What Even is This Crass and Unfunny Creation!". The web series is not making any sense and it is falling under cringe category safely. Concept of an orphan looking for his father is a serious story and this web series made fun of it which dealt with insensitive and annoying manner.
