= Gandii Baat =

Indian adult 18+ comedy web series

- Genre: Adult comedy
- Created by: Sachin Mohite
- Developed by: Baljit Singh Chaddha
- Screenplay by: Chital Rajesh Tripathi; Dialogues; Ranveer Pratap Singh
- Story by: Chital Rajesh Tripathi
- Directed by: Sachin Mohite
- Creative directors: Bhavna Sresth; Baljit Singh Chaddha; (ALT Balaji); (ZEE5)
- Theme music composer: Meet Beatz
- Composer: Shantanu Sudame
- Country of origin: India
- Original language: Hindi
- No. of seasons: 7
- No. of episodes: 28

Production
- Executive producers: Mayur shah Akanksha Shukla; Mitesh Hansa Jethva
- Producer: Arvind Adiga
- Production locations: Mumbai, Maharashtra, India
- Editors: Afzal Shaikh; Ajay. K. Pandey
- Camera setup: Multi-camera
- Running time: 42–45 minutes
- Production company: Jaasvand Entertainment Pvt Ltd

Original release
- Network: ALT Balaji
- Release: 3 May 2018 – 25 February 2023

Gandii Baat (transl. Dirty Talk) is an Indian adult comedy web series directed by Sachin Mohite for ALTBalaji. Now this series has been removed from the ZEE5 and MX Player because of the adult content, since Indian government released new OTT Platform Rules.

== Cast ==
=== Season 1 ===
==== Episode 1 Rachna Ka Saurabh ====
- Neetha Shetty as Gunja
- Rohit Chaudhary as amvar
- Sarthak as Doodnath
- Gunveen as Roopa
- Mayank as Almaari

==== Episode 2 Tharki Buddha ====
- Lovely Sharma as Kajari
- Naveen Pandita as Pradeep
- Rajesh Tripathi as Rajendra
- Yamini Singh as Eekha
- Harsh Vardan as Kaju

==== Episode 3 Vasu Nag ====
- Mrinalini Tyagi as Chakor
- Ripraj Chauhan as Jeeva
- Kalyani C Chaitanya as Dhaani
- Deepika H Khanna as Imli
- Anshuman Puskar as Nagnath
- Nirban Goswani as Resham Singh
- Kirti Choudhary as Rimjhim
- Saurabh Singhal as Rakesh
- Sourav Bansal as Shiva
- Ashok Yadav as Hori

==== Episode 4 Preeto Rani ====
- Narayani Shastri as Preeto
- Vijay Chandrna as Lucky
- Rudra Kaushik as Chandiram
- Gourav Kumar as Suraj
- Meenakshi as Soni
- Bachan Pachera as Balli
- Vaibhav Shah as Gogi

=== Season 2 ===
==== Episode 1 Bai-sexual ====
- Anveshi Jain as Neeta
- Flora Saini as Sajeeli
- Aman Maheshwari as Vaibhav
- Rahul Jaittly as Sagar

==== Episode 2 Jadui Mahal ====
- Sonam Arora as Roop
- Coral Bhamra as Sapna
- Maarisha K as Laachi
- Vinod Thirani as Laal Chand
- Sikandar Chohan as Sarpanch

==== Episode 3 Gibraltar ====
- Pradeep Duhan as Bhushan
- Nazneen Patni as Seema
- Agni Pawar as Maahi
- Manish Nawani as Mahesh
- Leena Acharya as Mohinihi

==== Episode 4 Love sex and betrayal ====
- Abhishek Gupta as Dugga
- Navneet Kaur as Sachi
- Ruby Bharaj as Heera
- Fahman Khan as Soma
- Tripti Agarwal as Ojha Maai
- Anil Bhagwat as Sukhiya
- Shiv Kumar Sharma as Yatin

==== Episode 5 Gudiya Rani ====
- Vikas Verma as Kishan Singh Sandhu
- Alpa Joshi as sukhi
- Pari Goswami as Baani
- Naina Chhabra as Raashi
- Raakeshh Dubey as Avtaar
- Jayshree Bhalse as Pammi
- Charu Srivastava as Champa
- Sakshi Sharma as Suneeta
- Virendra Singh as Randheer

=== Season 3 ===
==== Episode 1 Rajkumar ====
- Jatin Bhatia as Lakhan
- Neetu Wadhwa as Ramya
- Pallavi Mukherjee as Bicchi
- Ankit Kumar Gupta as Awara
- Zafar Warsi as Pagal
- Ranveer Pratap Singh as Deewana
- Bhavna Karekar as Kamal
- Gautam Saugat as Old Man
- Pankaj Kansara as Village Boy
- Stan as Angrez

==== Episode 2 Harpreet Weds Harpreet ====
- Lalit Bisht as Joginder
- Sheeva Rana as Harpreet
- Shiny Dixit as Harpreet 2
- Bhawsheel Sanni as Puppy
- Sunny Sachdeva as Jaspreet
- Mridula Mahajan as Lajjo
- Aabha Paul as Maami ji
- Farnaish Kaur as Manjeet
- S.p.s Sandhu as Manpreet 1 Dad
- Raman Dhagga as Harpreet 2 Dad
- Rajinder Rozy as Harpreet 2 Mom
- Akash Singh as Harpreet's secret lover

==== Episode 3 Sonam Chadh Gayi ====
- Aasma Syed as Sonam
- Rushali Arora as Sumitra
- Yajuvendra Singh as Netaji
- Tarun Dudeja as Vishal
- Jay Kumar as Rohan
- Akhil Vaidya as Station Master
- Anurag Mishra as Police Inspector
- Prashant Kumar as Pa Of Netaji
- Sujail Khan as Tt
- Akshay Kumar as Customer 426
- Ajay Raman as Customer 427
- Paras Randhawa as Sumitra's customer
- Uddhav Dharap as Announcer
- Yogi Raj as Kasai wath mujo obama

==== Episode 4 Honeymoon On Wheel ====
- Shikha Thakur as Sexy
- Kunwar Vikram Soni as Neeraj
- Palak Singh as Laxmi
- Rishikesh Ingley as Vaibhav
- Rohit Sharma as Bajrang
- Romit Baweja as Deepak
- Gehana Vasishth as Swati
- Arjun Khurana as Vimal
- Nehal Valodiya as Vimla

=== Season 4 ===
==== Episode 1 Betaab Dil Ki Tamanna ====
- Ankit Bhardwaj as Amar
- Ashish Dixit as Prem
- Saba Saudagar as Kanchan
- Megha Prasad as Suman
- Rohit Kumar as Brijesh

==== Episode 2 Woh Saat Din ====
- Yash Choudhury as Basant
- Nishikant Dixit as Mahipal
- Puja Jha as Taara
- Jay GB Patel as Ashok
- Gunjan Aras as Seema

==== Episode 3 Mera Pyaar Paan Nahi Jise khaya or thook diya ====
- Rishabh Shukla as Jayant
- Garima Jain as Kamlesh
- Ibra Khan as Megha
- Arsh Merchant as Kamlesh's husband
- Shashwant Jain as Nandu

==== Episode 4 ***** Pati Mera ====
- Urmimala Sinha Roy as Priya
- Jolly Bhatia as Rukhi
- Vikranth Thakry as Mohan
- Pawan Kumar as Suresh
- Salman Shaikh as Birju
- Neha Pal as Usha
- Taniya Chatterjree as Chandani
- Akansha Verma as Lata
- Avantika Mishra as Anjali
- Nataliya Kozhenova as Christie
- Vikash Pandey as Naate

==== Episode 5 Meetha Meetha Pyara Pyara ====
- Mridula Mahajan as Kusuma
- Aditya Singh Rajput as Savan
- Sneha Mishra as Roopa
- Rohit Mishra as Raghu
- Sanjana Padke as Sheela
- Liza Sing as Shilpa
- Sharwani Goswami as Alka
- Saundarya Seth as student at pathshala

=== Season 5 ===
==== Episode 1 Erotic Tales of Madhosh Madan ====
- Lakshya Handa as Chandan
- Guru Haryani as Ranjeet Sir
- Piyali Munsi as lalita Madam
- Satakshi Shorya as Neeli
- Parichay Sharma as Puppy
- Neelam Bhanushali as Beena Madam
- Aalya Singh as Sukhekha Madam

==== Episode 2 Game of Love ====
- Amika Shail as Priyanka
- Farmaan Haider as Santosh
- Pooja Dey as Nandini

==== Episode 3 Happy Valentine’s Day ====
- Nitin Bhatiya as Manoj
- Sanya Bansal as Meera
- Savant Singh Premi as Vaibhav
- Aadita Jain as Jyoti

==== Episode 4 Pintu's 5 Million Followers ====
- Sudhir as Pintu
- Ankit Bhatia as Dev
- Pamela Mondal as Muskaan

=== Season 6 ===
==== Episode 1 Who Killed My Wife ====
- Keval Dasani as Diwakar
- Mahima Gupta as Sarika
- Alisha Khan as Malti
- Deepak Gupta as Paras
- Nidhi Mahawan as Shills
- Mohit Sharma as Mandar
- Riya R Patwa as Sumitra

==== Episode 2 Experiment ====
- Kunwar Vikram Singh as Parimal
- Anjali Banerjee as Mohini
- Zoya Khan as Ruby
- Guru Haryani as Senior Cop
- Utkarsh Arora as Shekar
- Tripti Bajoria as Banita, Boss
- Romita Sarkar as Neelakshi, Youtber
- Guru Haryani as Cop
- Aanchal as Cop

=== Season 7 ===
==== Episode 1 Doge Yaa Loge? ====
- Basant Kumar as Naveen
- Jinal Jain as Pooja
- Bhavna Rokade as Sheetal
- Pooja Poddar as Pinky

==== Episode 2 Book Karo Roz.. Taxi Main Manao Moj ====
- Manvi Chugh as Naina
- Shivangi Roy as Saakshi
- Bhanu Suryam Thakur as Rasik
- Ayushman Das as Ritvik
- Vanya Singh Rajput as Amrita
- Suhana Khan as Muskaan

==== Episode 3 Masti ki Delivery.. Baar Baar Lagatar ====
- Yash Gera as Raghu
- Sreoshi Chatterjee as Rambha
- Garima Maurya as Sujata
- Pawan Utwani as Vivek
- Vivaan Srivastava as Manav

==== Episode 4 Reel Ka Feel ====
- Yash Chaudhary as Sunny
- Priyanka Upadhyay as Neetu
- Anna as Rozy
- Ravi Verma as Ballu
- Nehal Shaikh as Kallu
- Baljit Pandey as Gulshan
- Santosh Kumar as Manohar

== Episodes ==
Series	Episodes	Originally released		
Series	Episodes	First released	Last released	Network
1	4	3 May 2018	3 May 2018	ALTBalaji
2	5	7 January 2019	7 January 2019	ALTBalaji
3	4	27 July 2019	27 July 2019	ALTBalaji
4	5	7 January 2020	7 January 2020	ALTBalaji and ZEE5
5	4	8 October 2020	8 October 2020	ALTBalaji and ZEE5
6	2	21 January 2021	21 January 2021	ALTBalaji
7	4	25 February 2023	25 February 2023	ALTT

=== Season 1 ===
No. overall	No. in season	Title	Directed by	Written by	Original release date
1	1	"Threesome"	Sachin Mohite	Chital Rajesh Tripathi	3 May 2018
Namvar (Rohit Choudhury) catches his wife Gunja (Neetha Shetty) in bed with their neighbour (Anant Joshi). Initially, he abuses and even threatens them with a handgun, but relents and decides to join them, forcing a threesome.
2	2	"Tharki Buddha"	Sachin Mohite	Chital Rajesh Tripathi	3 May 2018
Rajendra's (Rajesh Tripathi) sense of convenience and comfort in technology grows to promises of deeper pleasure which affect his wife, son and daughter-in-law, replacing traditional boundaries with new ones.
3	3	"Vasu Nag"	Sachin Mohite	Chital Rajesh Tripathi	3 May 2018
Women in a village feel increasingly neglected by the men in their lives. A mysterious snake fills this void, challenging the men's dominance.
4	4	"Preeto Rani"	Sachin Mohite	Chital Rajesh Tripathi	3 May 2018
Preeto (Narayani Shastri) rules her household and the hearts of the men around her. Her son-in-law Gogi (Vaibhav Shah) challenges her position, but cannot handle the result when he tries to lay claim on her womanhood.

=== Season 2 ===
No. overall	No. in season	Title	Directed by	Written by	Original release date
5	1	"Bai-Sexual"	Sachin Mohite	Chital Rajesh Tripathi	7 January 2019
Neeta (Anveshi Jain) is shocked to learn about her husband Vaibhav's (Aman Maheshwari) affair with Sajeeli (Flora Saini). Her life takes a turn when Sajeeli makes an impossible demand for Vaibhav.
6	2	"Jadui Mahal"	Sachin Mohite	Chital Rajesh Tripathi	7 January 2019
An entire village is curious about the Jadui Mahal, which no one had dared to enter. The village sarpanch (Sikander Chohan) decides to explore the mystery, which changes everything.
7	3	"Gibraltar"	Sachin Mohite	Chital Rajesh Tripathi	7 January 2019
Bhushan (Pradeep Duhan) is desperate to marry Seema (Nazneen Patni), who is intimidated by her fiancé. Unable to handle any more humiliation, she decides to teach him a lesson.
8	4	"Love Sex and Betrayal"	Sachin Mohite	Chital Rajesh Tripathi	7 January 2019
Dugga, Sachi, Heera, and Soma learn the difference between love and lust through an age-old tradition.
9	5	"Gudiya Rani"	Sachin Mohite	Chital Rajesh Tripathi	7 January 2019
Truck driver Kishan Chand wakes up in a strange room and, unable to escape, realizes that he has been kidnapped and married.

=== Season 3 ===
No. overall	No. in season	Title	Directed by	Written by	Original release date
10	1	"Rajkumar"	Sachin Mohite	Chital Rajesh Tripathi	27 July 2019
A family of boat drivers (Hindi: mallaah) have an unusual relationship with other villagers and a boat. As per tradition, the girl must marry a boat before marrying the actual groom but it leads mysterious affair of the bride with a boat and cause her pregnant
11	2	"Harpreet Weds Harpreet"	Sachin Mohite	Chital Rajesh Tripathi	27 July 2019
Joginder comes to India from Canada for the wedding of his friend's brother Harpreet to a woman named Harpreet. While there, Joginder has a series of strange encounters with a mysterious woman also named Harpreet.
12	3	"Sonam Chad Gayi"	Sachin Mohite	Chital Rajesh Tripathi	27 July 2019
A politician's indulgence with a prostitute named Sonam creates a mishap with his family on a train journey.
13	4	"Honeymoon On Wheels"	Sachin Mohite	Chital Rajesh Tripathi	27 July 2019
Couples board a bus for a honeymoon and visit a village which is rumoured to be haunted as busses passing through on a certain day disappear.

=== Season 4 ===
No. overall	No. in season	Title	Directed by	Written by	Original release date
14	1	"Betaab Dil Ki Tamanna"	Sachin Mohite	Chital Rajesh Tripati	7 January 2020
TBA
15	2	"Woh Saat Din"	Sachin Mohite	Chital Rajesh Tripati	7 January 2020
A dancer was said to have cursed a village for men and women to reverse roles for seven days per month, which became an observed tradition. Two outsiders who marry local women refuse to follow the tradition.
16	3	"Mera Pyaar Paan Nahi Jisme Tum Chuna Laga Do"	Sachin Mohite	Chital Rajesh Tripati	7 January 2020
Stand-up comedian Jayant hates his demeaning wife. He looks online to buy almeri (cupboard) and meets widow Kamlesh, becoming friends then lovers. Jayant purchases Almera from her but when he opens it at home, he finds Kamlesh's husband's corpse. Later, Kamlesh reveals that she killed her villainous husband.
17	4	"Pati Mera"	Sachin Mohite	Chital Rajesh Tripati	7 January 2020
A group of beautiful city women visit a popular agrotourism destination, drawing the attention of the village's unemployed men. Their wives see an opportunity to earn some money.
18	5	"Meetha Meetha Pyara Pyara"	Sachin Mohite	Bharath Ratan	7 January 2020
Kusuma adores sexuality but is afraid of intercourse. She meets her lusty friends and finds a way to overcome her inhibition and help others.

=== Season 5 ===
No. overall	No. in season	Title	Directed by	Written by	Original release date
19	1	"Erotic Tales of Madhosh Madan"	Sachin Mohite	Ranveer Pratap Singh, Chital Tripathi and Rajesh Tripathi	8 October 2020
Chandan’s friends believe that he is ‘Madhosh Madan’, a popular writer of an erotic magazine series. But he insists that he is not. Life takes an unexpected turn when Chandan lands himself in trouble due to his mistaken identity.
20	2	"Game of Love"	Sachin Mohite	Ranveer Pratap Singh, Chital Tripathi and Rajesh Tripathi	8 October 2020
Priyanka is looking for a man to ignite her love life but when she meets Nandini and Santosh, she discovers her true desire and her rose-tinted idea of love is shattered.
21	3	"Happy Valentine’s Day"	Sachin Mohite	Ranveer Pratap Singh, Chital Tripathi and Rajesh Tripathi	8 October 2020
Meera decides to find a date on a dating app to take revenge on her cheating boyfriend. Little does she know that her act of vengeance is going to land her into trouble.
22	4	"Pintu's 5 Million Followers"	Sachin Mohite	Ranveer Pratap Singh, Chital Tripathi and Rajesh Tripathi	8 October 2020
Pintu, a delivery boy, becomes an overnight celebrity in his small town due to a viral video. To impress his girlfriend, he gets into bodybuilding and comes across Dev, a professional bodybuilder, who misleads him, throwing his life out of gear.

=== Season 6 ===
No. overall	No. in season	Title	Directed by	Written by	Original release date
23	1	"Who Killed My Wife"	Sachin Mohite	Sancheeta Bose, Ranveer Pratap Singh	21 January 2021
Sarika, a Modern- young housewife died mysteriously during the Holi celebration in the village. Malti, a friend of Sarika getting messages from Sarika's mobile about a mysterious box.
24	2	"Experiment"	Sachin Mohite	Ranveer Pratap Singh	21 January 2021
After marriage Parimal loses his libido due to stress and his wife Mohini is devastated. Ruby encourages Mohini to experiment with her sexual life while Parimal is hypnotized by an unknown female voice which leads him to become a psychopath.

=== Season 7 ===
No. overall	No. in season	Title	Directed by	Written by	Original release date
25	1	"Doge Yaa Loge?"	Sachin Mohite	Ranveer Pratap Singh	25 February 2023
Naveen and Pooja, who want to make out in a car and use a car-finding app to do so. The catch is that to "buy" the car, Naveen must stay with its owner, Sheetal, for a month as a form of barter.
26	2	"Book Karo Roz.. Taxi Main Manao Moj"	Sachin Mohite	Ranveer Pratap Singh	25 February 2023
Ritwik who is fed up with his live-in partner Amrita's constant taunting and ultimately stabs her to death. Amrita also secretly owns a taxi service called "Raseeli Cab," which provides services on the go.
27	2	"Masti Ki Delivery.. Baar Baar Lagatar"	Sachin Mohite	Ranveer Pratap Singh	25 February 2023
Amrita, who secretly owns a ride-sharing service called Raseeli Cab, and her live-in partner, Ritwik. The episode's plot centers on their relationship deteriorating due to Amrita's constant taunting, leading Ritwik to murder her.
28	2	"Reel Ka Feel"	Sachin Mohite	Ranveer Pratap Singh	25 February 2023
Pintu who, despite being popular with millions of online followers, struggles to find intimacy in his real life. His online persona, filled with aspirational content, contrasts sharply with his loneliness, leading him to seek a romantic connection.

A case has been filed against producer Ekta Kapoor and her mother, Shobha Kapoor, over allegations of inappropriate scenes involving minors in an episode of the web-series "Gandii Baat" on ALT Balaji over the case registered against them under the POCSO act.
