= Sangieta Rao =

Indian television and film director (born 1973)

- Born: 12 December 1973 (age 52); Mumbai, India
- Occupation: Film director
- Spouse: Ashish Rao

Sangieta Rao (born 12 December 1973) is an Indian television and film director. Her work as a television director includes the TV shows Pavitra Rishta, Jamai Raja for ZEE TV and Kkusum, Bade Achhe Lagte Hain for Sony Entertainment Television (India). She won the Best Director award for the show Bade Achhe Lagte Hain. She is directing Yes I Can.

== Director ==
=== Television ===
Title	Language	Channel
Abhalmaya	Marathi	Zee Marathi
Kimayagar	Marahi	Etv Marathi
Ek Hota Raja	Marathi	Etv Marathi
Vasudha	Marathi	Etv Marathi
Shagun	Hindi	Star Plus
Kkusum	Hindi	Sony TV
Kasautii Zindagii Kay	Hindi	Star Plus
Kyaa Hoga Nimmo Kaa	Hindi	Star One
Karam Apnaa Apnaa	Hindi	Star Plus
Tujh Sang Preet Lagai Sajna	Hindi	Star Plus
Kitani Mohabbat Hai (Season 1)	Hindi	Ndtv Imagine
Kitani Mohabbat Hai (season 2)	Hindi	Ndtv Imagine
Bade Achhe Lagte Hain	Hindi	Sony TV
Pavitra Rishta	Hindi	Zee TV
Jamai Raja (2014 TV series)	Hindi	Zee TV
Vidya (TV series)	Hindi	Colors TV
Nima Denzongpa	Hindi	Colors TV
Suhaagan	Hindi	Colors TV
Megha Barsenge	Hindi	Colors TV
Dhaakad Beera	Hindi	Colors TV
Mahadev and Sons	Hindi	Colors TV

=== Web series ===
Year	Title	Gener	Channel
2019	Virgin Bhasskar	Romantic Comedy	ZEE5
2020	Virgin Bhasskar 2	Romantic Comedy	ZEE5

=== Films ===
Year	Film	Language
2016	Yes I Can	Marathi

== Awards in TV ==
Year	Awards	Category	Show	Result
2011	Indian Television Academy Awards	Best Director Drama (Jury)	Bade Achhe Lagte Hain	Nominated
2012	Star Guild Awards	Best Drama Director(Fiction)	Bade Achhe Lagte Hain	Won
2013	Star Guild Awards	Best Drama Director(Fiction)	Bade Achhe Lagte Hain	Nominated
2015	Mumbai Mayor's Award	Remarkable Work as a Woman in Direction		Won
2024	Indian Television Academy Awards (ITAA)	Best Director Drama ( Fiction)	Megha Barsenge	Won
