= Paisa Yaar N Panga =

- Directed by: Virender Singh
- Written by: Ranjeev Verma
- Produced by: Bharat Arora, Arvinder Singh, Gurprit Singh Gujral,
- Starring: Gavie Chahal; Mukul Dev; Veer Vashisht; Khushboo Grewal; Flora Saini; Karan Sekhon (Debut); Rishita Monga; Richa
- Music by: Gurmeet Singh & Jassi Katyal
- Distributed by: Omjee Cine World
- Release date: 1 August 2014
- Country: India
- Language: Punjabi

Paisa Yaar N Panga (पैसा यार और पंगा, ਪੈਸਾ ਯਾਰ ਪੰਗਾ) is a Punjabi comedy film directed by Virender Singh and produced by Bharat Arora, Arvinder Singh and Gurprit Singh Gujral. It stars Gavie Chahal, Mukul Dev, Khushboo Grewal, Flora Saini, Karan Sekhon (Debut), and Veer Vashisht. The movie was produced under the banner of Blockbuster Motion Pictures. The film revolves around 3 best buddies, but the thriller comes when Mukul Dev enters their lives. Paisa Yaar N Panga was released on 1 August 2014.

== Cast ==
- Gavie Chahal as Fateh
- Mukul Dev as Ranveer Walia
- Veer Vashisht as Karan
- Khushboo Grewal as Vaani
- Flora Saini as Meera
- Karan Sekhon as Bunty
- Rishita Monga as Reet
- Ranjeev Verma as SSP
- Richa as Dolly

== Release ==
The film was initially scheduled to release on 11 July 2014.
