= ALTT =

Subscription based video on demand platform

- Type: Subsidiary
- Industry: Entertainment, Mass media
- Genre: OTT platform
- Founded: 16 April, 2017
- Founder: Ekta Kapoor
- Defunct: 25 July, 2025
- Headquarters: Mumbai, Maharashtra, India
- Services: Film production; film distribution; television production
- Website: altbalaji.com (closed)

ALTT, formerly ALTBalaji, was an Indian subscription based video on demand platform and a wholly owned subsidiary of Balaji Telefilms. Launched on 16 April 2017, ALTBalaji became Balaji Telefilms' foray into the digital entertainment sphere to create original OTT content.

In July 2025, it was banned by the government of India citing obscenity. Balaji Telefilms went onto replace ALTT with Kutingg, a family friendly streaming platform.

== Platforms ==
ALTT was an Indian content-based video-on-demand platform. ALTT was available across 32 different interfaces for its viewers. The content had been made available on mobile and Tablet Devices (Apple phone, Apple iPad, Android phone, Android tablet), Web browser (Desktop Browser), Chromecast, Android TV, Apple TV, Amazon Fire TV, Roku, and Windows (Windows PC, Windows Mobile, Windows tablet). The website indicated that the platform will showcase over 250+ hours of original content with a new show every month, with 32 new shows lined up in the first year, featuring India's top actors and directors. The content bank also included 100+ hours of kids' content as well as urban regional shows in Bengali, Hindi, Marathi, Punjabi, Tamil and other languages.

== Shows ==
Year	Title	Genre	Premiere	Language	Notes
2017	Karrle Tu Bhi Mohabbat (season 1)	Drama	21 Apr 2017	Hindi	
2017	Romil & Jugal	Drama	21 April 2017	Hindi	
2017	Bewafaa sii Wafaa	Drama	21 April 2017	Hindi	
2017	Boygiri	Drama	21 April 2017	Hindi	
2017	Dev DD	Thriller	21 April 2017	Hindi	
2017	Maya Thirrai	Drama	21 April 2017	Hindi	
2017	The Test Case	Drama	30 April 2017	Hindi	
2017	Class of 2017	Drama, Comedy	12 July 2017	Hindi	
2017	CyberSquad	Drama	14 August 2017	Hindi	
2017	Pammi Aunty	Drama	22 September 2017	Hindi	
2017	Ragini MMS: Returns (season 1)	Drama	19 October 2017	Hindi	
2017	Bose: Dead/Alive	Drama	20 November 2017	Hindi	
2017	Dhimaner Dinkaal	Drama	11 December 2017	Hindi	
2018	Fourplay	Comedy	15 January 2018	Hindi	
2018	Haq Se	Drama	2 February 2018	Hindi	
2018	Karrle Tu Bhi Mohabbat (season 2)	Drama	14 February 2018	Hindi	
2018	Kehne Ko Humsafar Hain (season 1)	Drama	16 March 2018	Hindi	
2018	Galti Se Mis-Tech	Drama, Comedy	7 April 2018	Hindi	
2018	PM Selfiewallie	Drama	18 April 2018	Hindi	
2018	Gandii Baat (season 1)	Erotic Drama	3 May 2018	Hindi	
2018	Dil Hi Toh Hai (season 1)	Family Drama	18 June 2018	Hindi	
2018	Hum - I'm Because of Us	Drama	30 July 2018	Hindi	
2018	Home	Drama	29 August 2018	Hindi	
2018	XXX (season 1)	Erotic Drama	27 September 2018	Hindi	
2018	The Great Indian Dysfunctional Family	Family Drama	10 October 2018	Hindi	
2018	Zaban Sambhal Ke	Drama	19 October 2018	Hindi	
2018	Baby Come Naa	Comedy	2 November 2018	Hindi	
2018	Broken But Beautiful (season 1)	Romance Drama	7 November 2018	Hindi	
2018	Apharan (Season 1)	Crime Drama	14 December 2018	Hindi	
2019	Gandii Baat (season 2)	Adult Drama	7 January 2019	Hindi	
2019	Hero Vardiwala	Action Drama	25 January 2019	Hindi	
2019	Dil Hi Toh Hai (season 2)	Romance Drama	2 Feb 2019	Hindi	
2019	Puncch Beat	Youth Drama	8 Feb 2019	Hindi	
2019	Kehne Ko Humsafar Hain (season 2)	Romance Drama	14 Feb 2019	Hindi	
2019	Karrle Tu Bhi Mohabbat (season 3)	Romance Drama	2 April 2019	Hindi	
2019	Baarish (season 1)	Family Drama	25 April 2019	Hindi	
2019	Bekaaboo (season 1)	Erotic Drama	15 May 2019	Hindi	
2019	Medically Yourrs	College Drama	27 May 2019	Hindi	
2019	Booo Sabki Phategi	Thriller Comedy	27 June 2019	Hindi	
2019	Gandii Baat (season 3)	Adult Drama	27 July 2019	Hindi	
2019	BOSS: Baap of Special Services	Thriller	2 August 2019	Hindi	
2019	Coldd Lassi Aur Chicken Masala	Drama	3 September 2019	Hindi	
2019	M.O.M – Mission Over Mars	Drama	10 September 2019	Hindi	
2019	The Verdict - State vs Nanavati	Crime Drama	30 September 2019	Hindi	
2019	Fixerr	Drama	7 October 2019	Hindi	
2019	Fittrat	Romance Drama	18 October 2019	Hindi	
2019	Virgin Bhasskar (season 1)	Adult Humour	19 November 2019	Hindi	
2019	Broken But Beautiful (season 2)	Romance Drama	27 November 2019	Hindi	
2019	Hum Tum and Them	Family Drama	6 December 2019	Hindi	
2019	Ragini MMS: Returns (season 2)	Adult Thriller	18 December 2019	Hindi	
2020	Gandii Baat (season 4)	Adult Drama	7 January 2020	Hindi	
2020	Code M (season 1)	Army Drama	15 January 2020	Hindi	
2020	Dil Hi Toh Hai (season 3)	Romance Drama	27 January 2020	Hindi	
2020	Class of 2020	Youth Drama	4 February 2020	Hindi	
2020	It Happened In Calcutta	Romance Drama	29 February 2020	Hindi	
2020	Mentalhood	Family Drama	11 March 2020	Hindi	
2020	XXX (season 2)	Sensual Drama	27 March 2020	Hindi	
2020	Who's Your Daddy? (season 1)	Adult Humour	12 April 2020	Hindi	
2020	Baarish (season 2)	Romance Drama	6 May 2020	Hindi	
2020	Kehne Ko Humsafar Hain (season 3)	Romance Drama	6 June 2020	Hindi	
2020	Virgin Bhasskar (season 2)	Adult Comedy	29 August 2020	Hindi	
2020	Bebaakee	Romance Drama	30 August 2020	Hindi	
2020	Gandii Baat (season 5)	Adult Drama	8 October 2020	Hindi	
2020	Mum Bhai	Action Drama	6 November 2020	Hindi	
2020	Bicchoo Ka Khel	Thriller Drama	18 November 2020	Hindi	
2020	Dark 7 White	Thriller Drama	24 November 2020	Hindi	
2020	Who's Your Daddy (season 2)	Adult Humour	22 December 2020	Hindi	
2020	Paurashpur (Season 1)	Period Drama	29 December 2020	Hindi	
2021	Gandii Baat (season 6)	Adult Drama	21 January 2021	Hindi	
2021	Bang Baang	Thriller	25 January 2021	Hindi	
2021	Hello Jee	Comedy	1 February 2021	Hindi	
2021	LSD - Love, Scandal and Doctors	Adult Drama	5 February 2021	Hindi	
2021	Crashh	Family Drama	14 February 2021	Hindi	
2021	Dev DD (season 2)	Drama	20 February 2021	Hindi	
2021	The Married Woman	Drama	8 March 2021	Hindi	
2021	Bekaaboo (season 2)	Adult Drama	15 March 2021	Hindi	
2021	Mai Hero Boll Raha Hu	Crime Drama	20 April 2021	Hindi	
2021	His Storyy	Drama	25 April 2021	Hindi	
2021	Hai Taubba	Comic Drama	6 May 2011	Hindi	
2021	Hai Taubba (chapter 2)	Comic Drama	21 May 2021	Hindi	
2021	Broken But Beautiful (season 3)	Romantic drama	29 May 2021	Hindi	
2021	Puncch Beat (season 2)	Youth Drama	27 June 2021	Hindi	
2021	Crime & Confessions (season 1)	Adult comedy	7 August 2021	Hindi	
2021	Cartel	Political drama	20 August 2021	Hindi	
2021	Hai Taubba - Chapter 3	Comic Drama	11 September 2021	Hindi	
2021	Girgit	Thriller Drama	27 October 2021	Hindi	
2021	Pavitra Rishta 2.0	Family Drama	10 November 2021	Hindi	
2022	Lock Upp (Season 1)	Reality show	27 February 2022	Hindi	
2022	Pavitra Rishta 2.0 (season 2)	Family Drama	25 March 2022	Hindi	
2022	Apharan (season 2)	Crime Drama	24 May 2022	Hindi	
2022	Code M (season 2)	Army Drama	9 June 2022	Hindi	

== Controversy ==
An FIR was filed against filmmaker Ekta Kapoor, alleging an insult to the national emblem, Hindu gods and army personnel in ALTBalaji's XXX web series. Ekta's representatives have since said that the controversial scene has been removed.

A case has been filed against producer Ekta Kapoor and her mother, Shobha Kapoor, over allegations of inappropriate scenes involving minors in an episode of the web-series Gandii Baat on ALT Balaji over the case registered against them under the POCSO act.

ALTT was among 25 apps banned by the Ministry of Information and Broadcasting in July 2025 over "obscene, vulgar and in some cases, pornographic content". Balaji Telefilms replaced the streaming website with Kutingg, a family friendly streaming platform.
