= List of Indian film actresses =

This is an alphabetical list of notable Indian film actresses. Given below is a list that includes actresses from different time periods—from early pioneers of silent cinema and the golden age of Indian films to contemporary performers who have achieved critical and commercial success. Actresses listed here may have worked in more than one regional industry, and many have also appeared in international projects. The following are some of the most popular Indian actresses of their languages:

A glimpse of the many celebrated actresses of Indian cinema

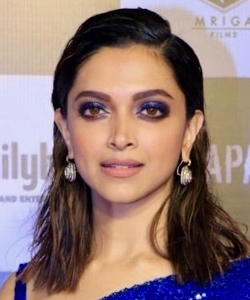
Hindi: Deepika Padukone

Telugu: Samantha

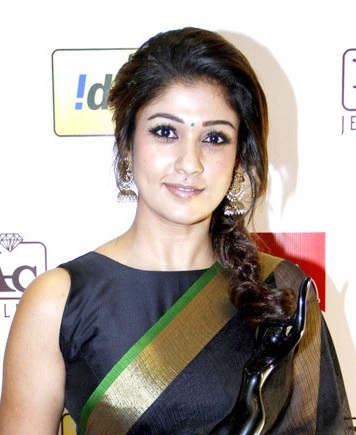
Tamil: Nayanthara

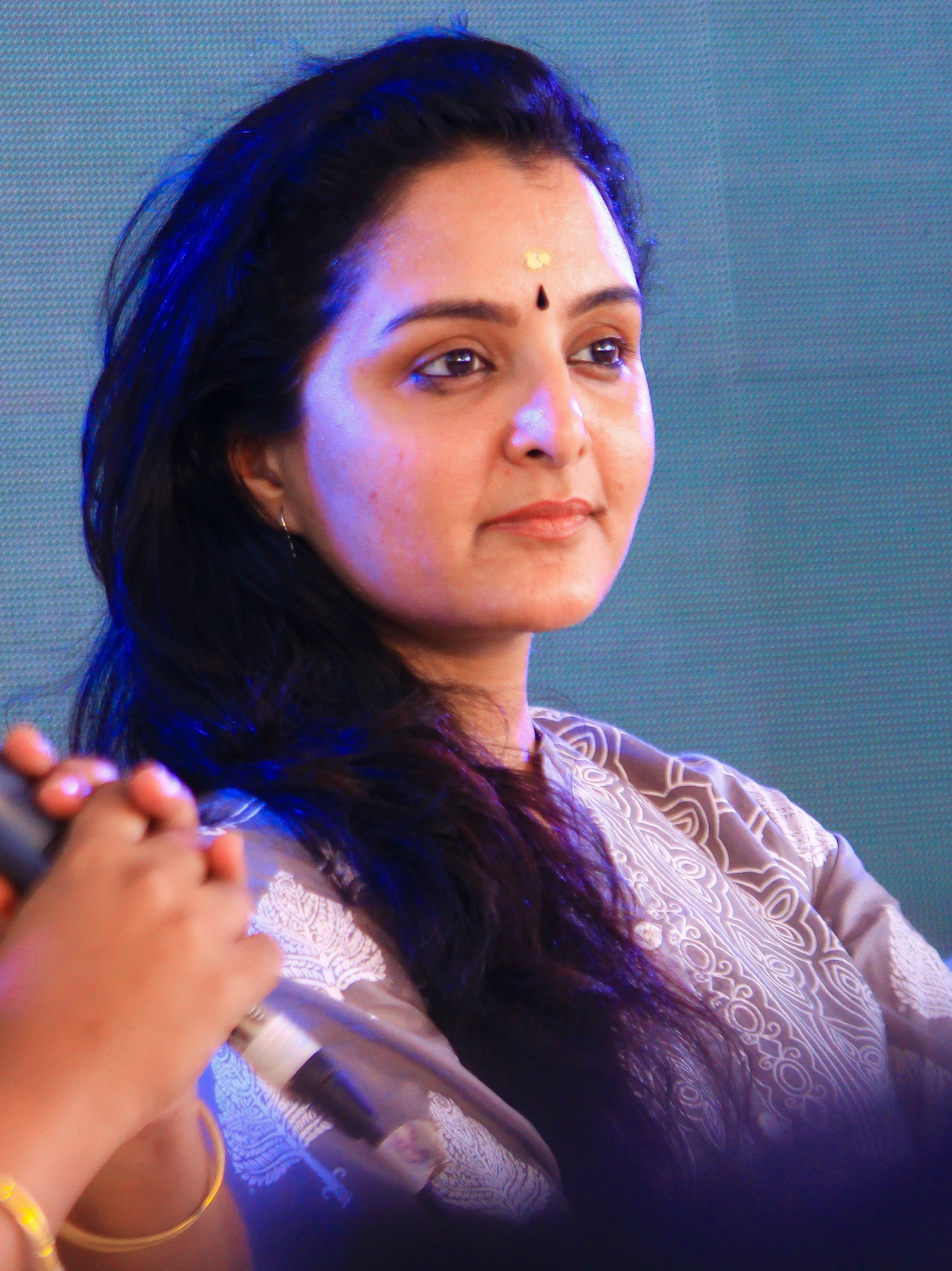
Malayalam: Manju Warrier

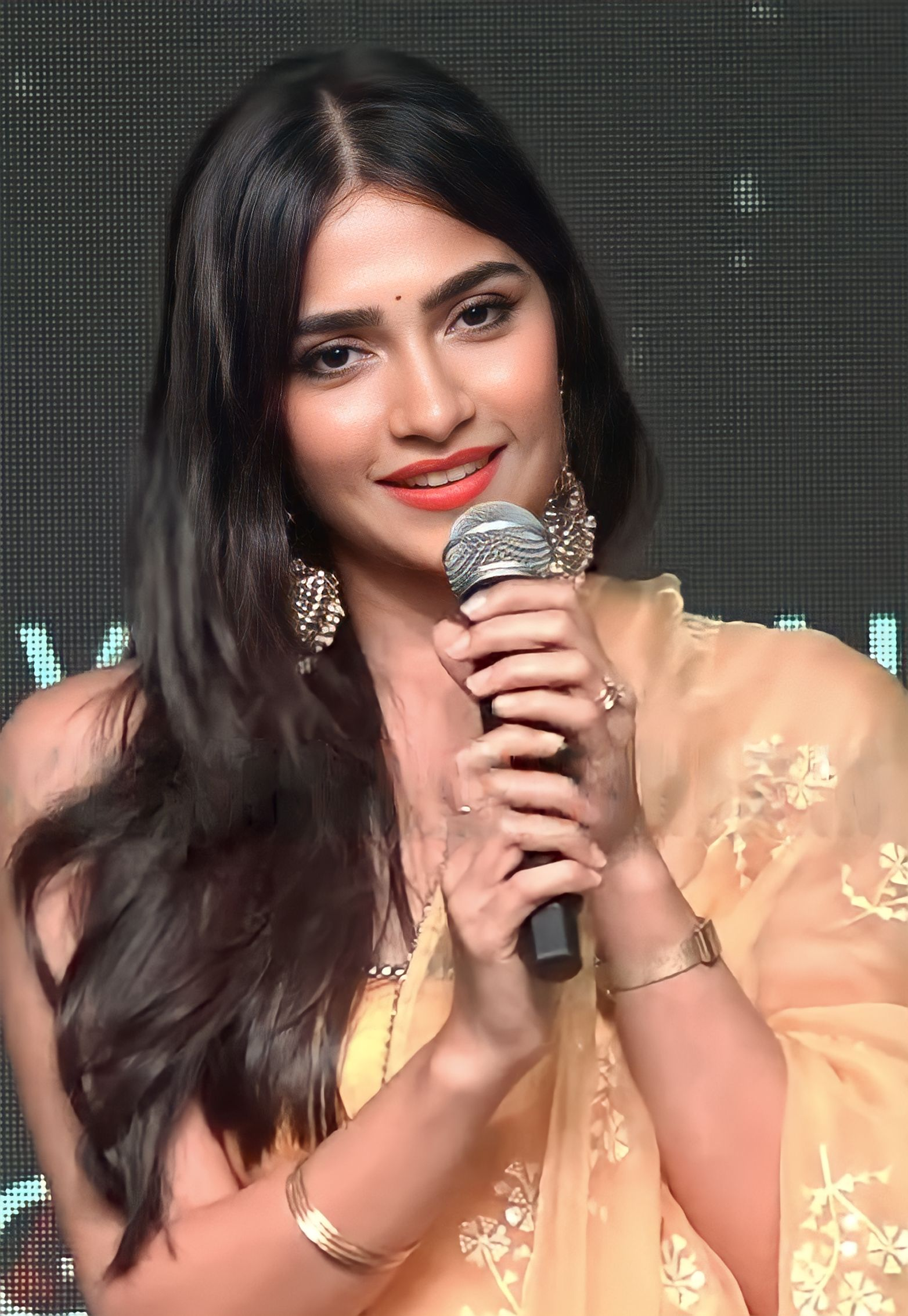
Kannada: Rukmini Vasanth

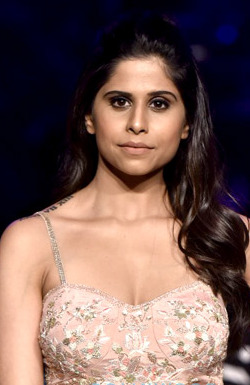
Marathi: Sai Tamhankar

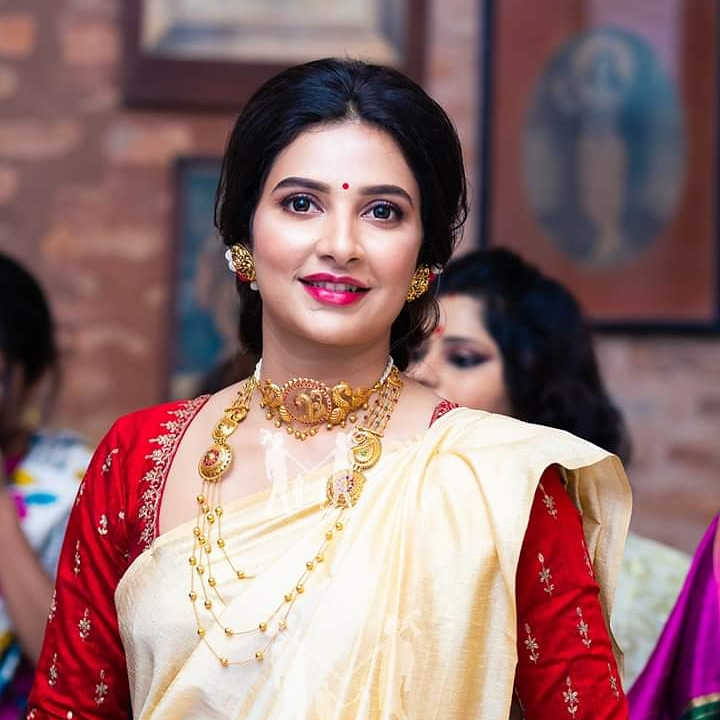
Bengali: Subhashree Ganguly

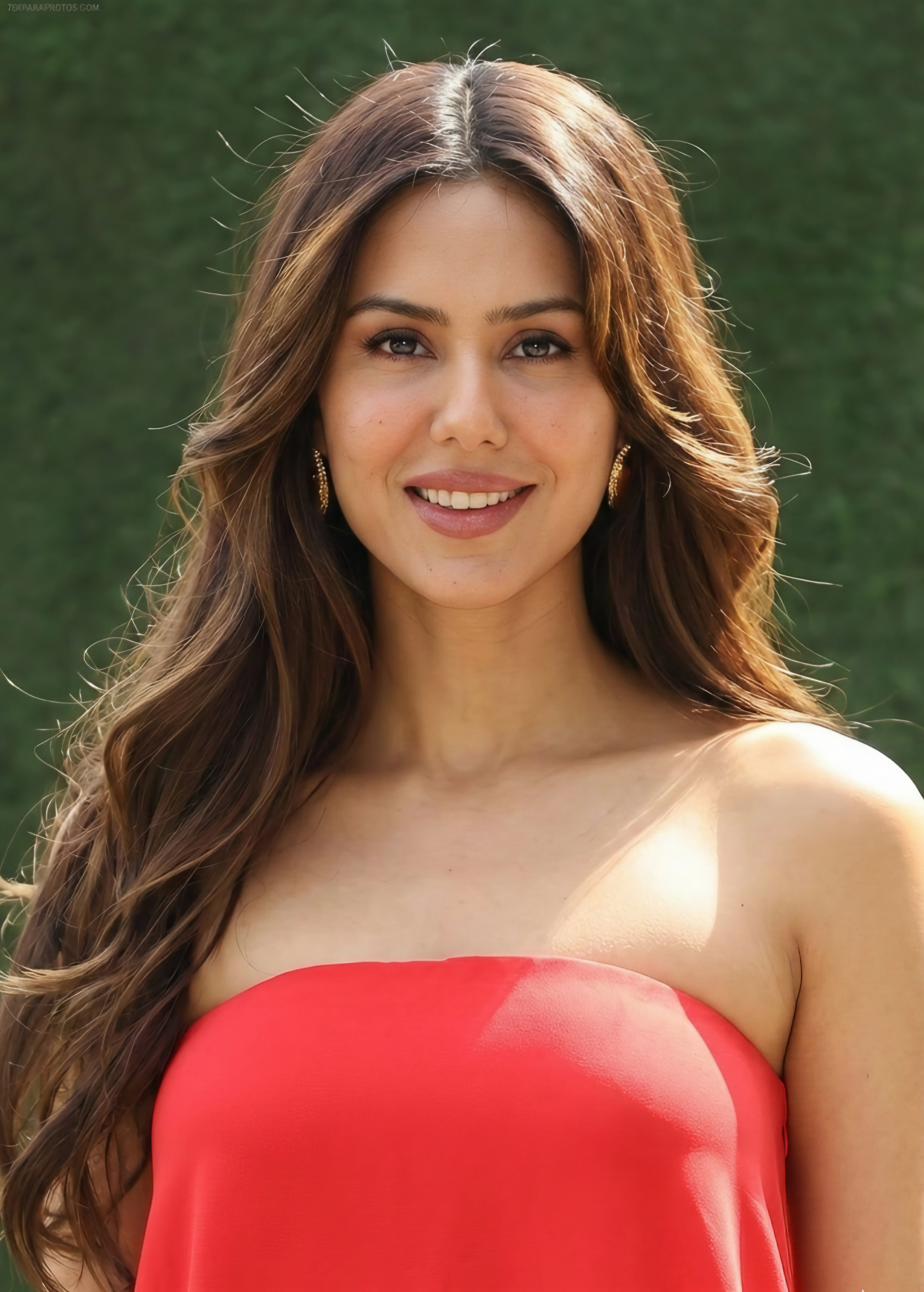
Punjabi: Sonam Bajwa

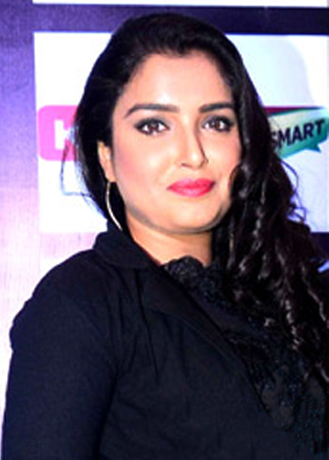
Bhojpuri: Amrapali Dubey

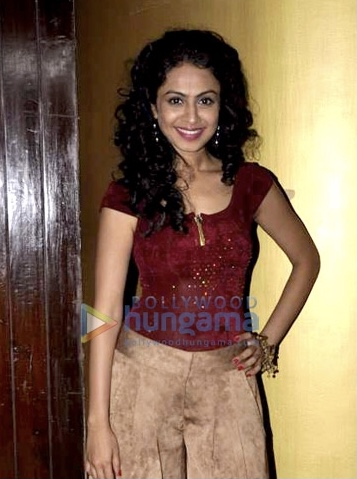
Gujarati: Manasi Parekh

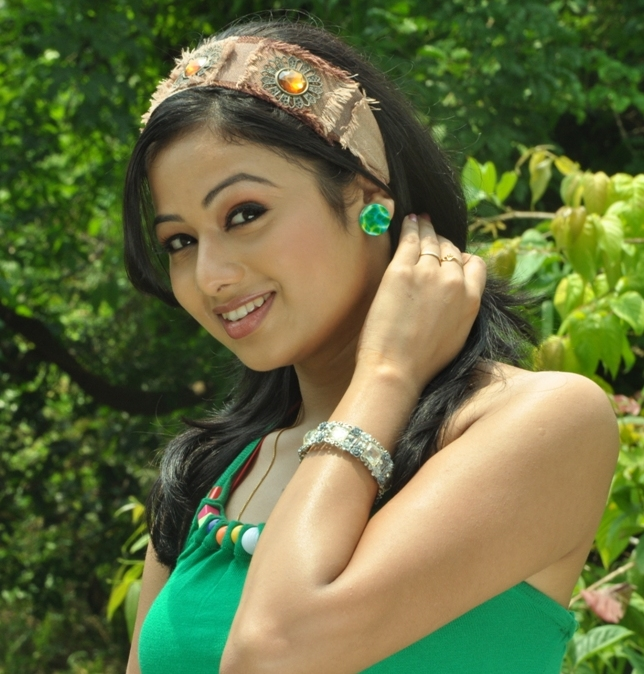
Odia: Archita Sahu

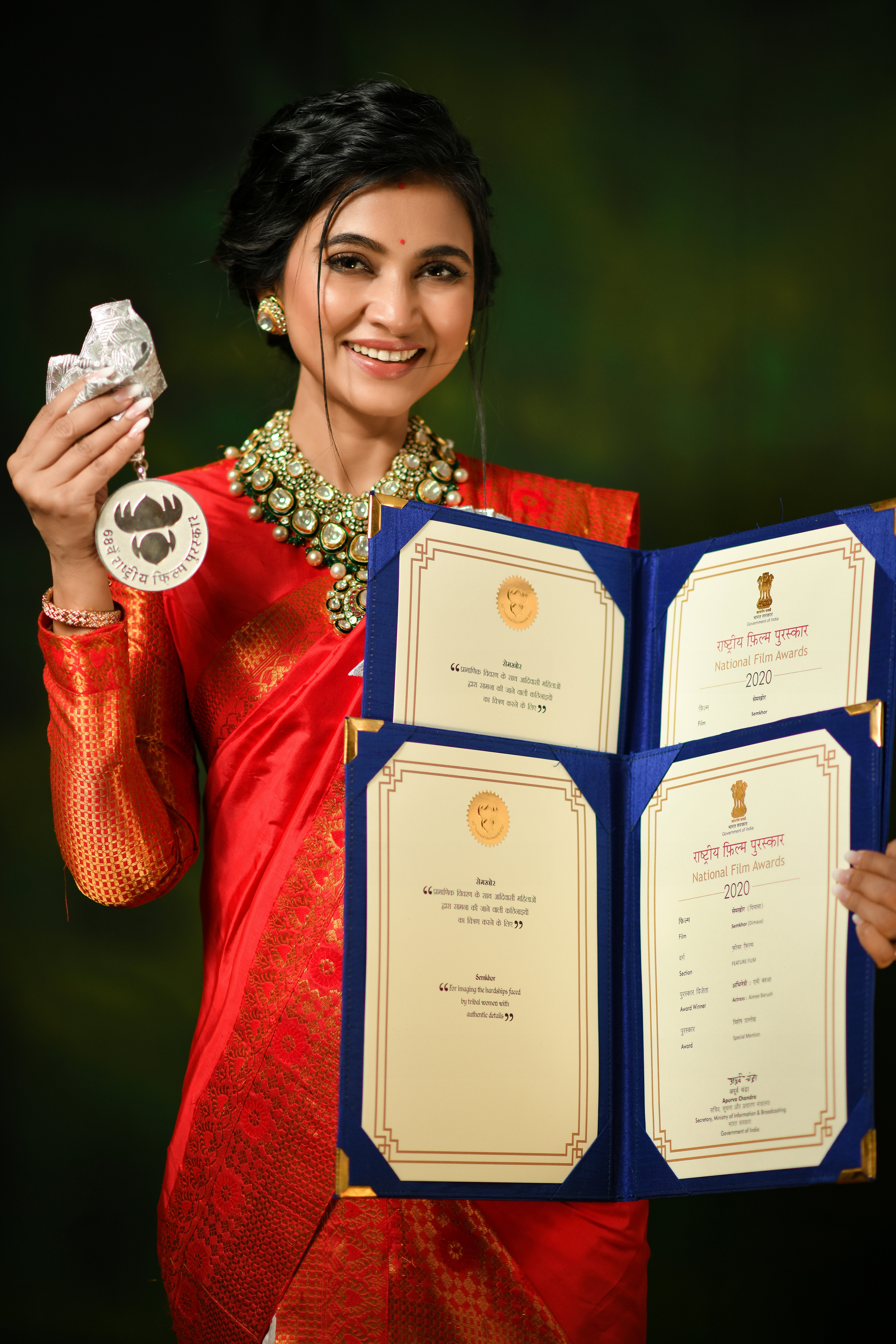
Assamese: Aimee Baruah

Indian cinema is one of the largest and most diverse film industries in the world, encompassing productions in multiple languages including Hindi, Tamil, Telugu, Malayalam, Kannada cinema, Bengali, Marathi, and others. These actresses have contributed significantly to the growth and evolution of Indian films, both mainstream and regional, across various eras.

== A ==
- Aaditi Pohankar
- Aahana Kumra
- Aakanksha Singh
- Aamna Sharif
- Aanchal Munjal
- Aarathi
- Aamani
- Aarthi Agarwal
- Aarti Chabria
- Abhirami
- Abhinaya (actress)
- Adah Sharma
- Aditi Arya
- Aditi Ravi
- Aditi Sharma
- Aditi Govitrikar
- Aditi Rao Hydari
- Aditi Sarangdhar
- Advani Lakshmi Devi
- Aeshra Patel
- Ahaana Krishna
- Ahsaas Channa
- Aimee Baruah
- Aindrita Ray
- Aisha Sharma
- Aishwarya
- Aishwarya Arjun
- Aishwarya Devan
- Aishwarya Lekshmi
- Aishwarya Nag
- Aishwarya Rai Bachchan
- Aishwarya Rajesh
- Aishwarya Sakhuja
- Akanksha Juneja
- Aksha Pardasany
- Akshara Gowda
- Akshara Haasan
- Akshara Menon
- Alia Bhatt
- Alaya Furniturewala
- Amala Akkineni
- Amala Paul
- Ambika
- Ameeta
- Ameesha Patel
- Amoolya
- Amrita Arora
- Amrita Prakash
- Amrita Puri
- Amrita Rao
- Amritha Aiyer
- Amrita Raichand
- Amrita Singh
- Amrutha Iyengar
- Amruta Khanvilkar
- Amruta Subhash
- Amyra Dastur
- Amy Jackson
- Anaika Soti
- Ananya
- Ananya Panday
- Ananya Kasaravalli
- Anaswara Kumar
- Anaswara Rajan
- Andrea Jeremiah
- Andria D'Souza
- Aneet Padda
- Anindita Nayar
- Angira Dhar
- Anandhi (actress)
- Annie
- Anikha Surendran
- Anita Hassanandani Reddy
- Anita Guha
- Anita Raj
- Anjala Zhaveri
- Anjali Anand
- Anjali
- Anjali Devi
- Anjali Sudhakar
- Anjana Bhowmick
- Anjana Jayaprakash
- Anjana Sukhani
- Anju Mahendru
- Ankita Lokhande
- Ann Augustine
- Ansiba Hassan
- Antara Mali
- Anu Aggarwal
- Anu Prabhakar
- Anu Sithara
- Anupama Parameswaran
- Anu Emmanuel
- Anupriya Goenka
- Anuradha Mehta
- Anurita Jha
- Anusha Dandekar
- Anushka Ranjan
- Anushka Sen
- Anushka Sharma
- Anushka Shetty
- Anuya Bhagvath
- Anya Singh
- Aparnaa Bajpai
- Aparna Balamurali
- Aparna Sen
- Apoorva Arora
- Archana
- Archana Jose Kavi
- Archana Puran Singh
- Archana Gupta
- Archita Sahu
- Aruna Balraj
- Aruna Irani
- Aruna Shields
- Arundathi Nag
- Asawari Joshi
- Asha Negi
- Asha Bhat
- Asha Parekh
- Asha Saini
- Ashima Bhalla
- Ashnoor Kaur
- Ashwini Bhave
- Ashwini Kalsekar
- Asin Thottumkal
- Ashika Ranganath
- Athiya Shetty
- Athulya Ravi
- Ayesha Jhulka
- Ayesha Raza
- Ayesha Takia
- Akanksha Puri
- Avani Modi
- Avika Gor
- Avantika Mishra
- Avneet Kaur
- Auritra Ghosh

== B ==
- Babita
- Barkha Bisht Sengupta
- Barkha Singh
- Bala Hijam
- Barsha Priyadarshini
- Barsha Rani Bishaya
- Beena Banerjee
- Bhagyashree
- Bhagyashri Borse
- Bhairavi Goswami
- Bhama
- Bhanumathi
- Bhanupriya
- Bharathi Vishnuvardhan
- Bhargavi Narayan
- Bhavana
- Bhavana (actress)
- Bhavana Rao
- Bhavani Prakash
- Bhavya
- Bhoomika Chawla
- Bhumi Pednekar
- Bijoya Ray
- Bianca Desai
- Bidita Bag
- Bindu
- Bindu Madhavi
- Bipasha Basu
- Bina Rai
- Bobby Darling
- Bruna Abdullah
- B. V. Radha

== C ==
- Carol Gracias
- Celina Jaitley
- Chahat Khanna
- Chandrakala
- Chandrika
- Charmila
- Charmy Kaur
- Charu Asopa
- Chaya Singh
- Chetana Das
- Chetna Pande
- Chhavi Mittal
- Chhaya Kadam
- Chippy
- Chithra
- Chitrangada Singh
- Chitrashi Rawat
- Catherine Tresa
- Claudia Ciesla

== D ==
- Daisy Bopanna
- Daisy Shah
- Daisy Irani
- Darshana Rajendran
- Debashree Roy
- Deeksha Seth
- Deepa Sahi
- Deepa Sannidhi
- Deepal Shaw
- Deepika Amin
- Deepika Chikhalia
- Deepika Padukone
- Deepti Naval
- Deepti Bhatnagar
- Deepti Sadhwani
- Deepti Sati
- Delnaaz Paul
- Devayani
- Devika
- Devika Rani Roerich
- Devoleena Bhattacharjee
- Dharti Bhatt
- Divya Bharti
- Dia Mirza
- Diana Hayden
- Diana Penty
- Digangana Suryavanshi
- Dimple Jhangiani
- Dimple Kapadia
- Dimple Hayathi
- Dipannita Sharma
- Disha Parmar
- Disha Patani
- Disha Vakani
- Divyabharathi
- Divya Dutta
- Divya Khosla Kumar
- Divyanka Tripathi
- Drashti Dhami
- Durga Khote

== E ==
- Elli Avram
- Esha Deol
- Esha Gupta
- Ena Saha
- Eesha Rebba
- Evelyn Sharma
- Elina Samantray
- Erica Fernandes
- Easwari Rao

== F ==
- Farah Naaz
- Farida Jalal
- Fatima Sana Shaikh
- Fatma Begum
- Faria Abdullah
- Freida Pinto
- Feryna Wazheir

== G ==
- Gabriela Bertante
- Gajala
- Gauahar Khan
- Gauri Karnik
- Gautami
- Gayathri Raguram
- Gayathrie
- Gayatri
- Gayatri Jayaraman
- Gayatri Joshi
- Gayatri Patel
- Geeta Bali
- Geeta Basra
- Geeta Dutt
- Geetanjali Thapa
- Geetha
- Geetu Mohandas
- Genelia D'Souza
- Giaa Manek
- Girija
- Girija Lokesh
- Girija Shettar
- Giselli Monteiro
- Gopika
- Gowri Pandit
- Gowri Munjal
- Gul Panag
- Gunjan Malhotra

== H ==
- Hansika Motwani
- Harini
- Haripriya
- Harnaaz Sandhu
- Harshika Poonacha
- Hasleen Kaur
- Hazel Keech
- Heera Rajagopal
- Helen
- Hema Bellur
- Hema Prabhath
- Hema Malini
- Honey Rose
- Hrishitaa Bhatt
- Huma Qureshi
- Humaima Malik
- Hebah Patel
- Hina Khan
- Hiba Nawab

== I ==
- Ilene Hamann
- Indrani Haldar
- Indraja
- Iniya
- Iravati Harshe
- Isha Chawla
- Ivana (actress)
- Isha Sharvani
- Isha Koppikar
- Isha Talwar
- Ishita Chauhan
- Ishita Dutta
- Ishita Raj Sharma
- Izabelle Leite
- Ileana D'Cruz

== J ==
- Jacqueline Fernandez
- Jannat Zubair Rahmani
- Janhvi Kapoor
- Jasmin Bhasin
- Jayabharathi
- Jayanthi (actress)
- Jayachitra
- J. Jayalalithaa
- Jaya Bachchan
- Jamuna (actress)
- Jaya Prada
- Jaya Seal
- Jayasudha
- Jayamala
- Jayamalini
- Jayshree Gadkar
- Jennifer Kotwal
- Jennifer Winget
- Jharana Bajracharya
- Jhataleka Malhotra
- Jiya Khan
- Jugnu Ishiqui
- Juhi Chawla
- Juhi Babbar
- Jyothika
- Jonita Gandhi

== K ==
- Kainaat Arora
- Kajal Aggarwal
- Kajal Kiran
- Kajjanbai
- Kajol
- Kalki Koechlin
- Kalpana (Kannada actress)
- Kalpana (Malayalam actress)
- Kalpana Mohan
- Kalpana Iyer
- Kalpana Kartik
- Kalyani Priyadarshan
- Kamini Kaushal
- Kamini Kadam
- Kamalinee Mukherjee
- Kayadu Lohar
- Kamna Jethmalani
- Kanaka
- Kanakam
- Kanchana
- Kangana Ranaut
- Kanika Subramaniam
- Kareena Kapoor Khan
- Karisma Kapoor
- Karishma Kotak
- Karishma Sharma
- Karishma Tanna
- Karunya Ram
- Kasthuri Shankar
- Karthika Mathew
- Karthika Nair
- Katrina Kaif
- Kashmira Irani
- Kashmira Shah
- Kausalya
- Kaviyoor Ponnamma
- Kavya Madhavan
- Keerthi Bhat
- Keerthi Reddy
- Keerthi Suresh
- Ketaki Narayan
- Kiara Advani
- Kimi Katkar
- Kimi Verma
- Kim Sharma
- Kim Yashpal
- Kiran Rathod
- Kirron Kher
- Kirat Bhattal
- Kiran Juneja
- Kirti Kulhari
- Kishori Shahane
- Kishwer Merchant Rai
- Kitu Gidwani
- Kovai Sarala
- Koel Mallick
- Koel Purie
- Koena Mitra
- Komal
- Komal Jha
- Konkona Sen Sharma
- K. R. Vijaya
- K. R. Savithri
- K. R. Vatsala
- Krishna Kumari
- Kriti Kharbanda
- Kriti Sanon
- Krithi Shetty
- Kritika Kamra
- Krystle D'Souza
- Kruthika Jayakumar
- Kubbra Sait
- Khushi Kapoor
- Khushbu Sundar
- Kumari
- Kumkum
- Kuljeet Randhawa
- Kulraj Randhawa
- Kyra Dutt

== L ==
- Lakshmi
- Laila Mehdin
- Lalita Pawar
- Lalitha (KPAC)
- Lalitha
- Lara Dutta
- Laila Mehdin
- Lakshmi Chandrashekar
- Lakshmidevi
- Laxmi Chhaya
- Lakshmi Gopalaswamy
- Lakshmi Manchu
- Lakshmi Menon
- Lakshmi Rai
- Latha
- Lauren Gottlieb
- Lavanya Tripathi
- Laya
- Leela Chitnis
- Leelavathi
- Leena Chandavarkar
- Leena Jumani
- Lekha Washington
- Lena
- Leslie Tripathy
- Lilette Dubey
- Lisa Ray
- Lisa Haydon

== M ==
- Madhavi
- Madhoo (now Madhoo Shah)
- Madhubala
- Madhumitha
- Madhuri Bhattacharya
- Madhuri Dixit
- Madhuri Itagi
- Madhurima Tuli
- Madhuurima
- Madhu Shalini
- Madhura Naik
- Madonna Sebastian
- Mahasweta Ray
- Mahalakshmi
- Mahek Chahal
- Mahie Gill
- Mahika Sharma
- Mahima Chaudhry
- Mahira Khan
- Mahua Roychoudhury
- Mala Sinha
- Malashri
- Malavika
- Maheswari
- Malaika Arora
- Malavika Avinash
- Malvi Malhotra
- Malavika Mohanan
- Malavika Nair
- Malavika Nair
- Malavika Wales
- Mallika Kapoor
- Mallika Sherawat
- Mamta Kulkarni
- Mamta Mohandas
- Mansi Parekh
- Manasvi Mamgai
- Mandakini
- Mandana Karimi
- Mandira Bedi
- Manini Mishra
- Manisha Koirala
- Manjari Phadnis
- Manjima Mohan
- Manju Bhargavi
- Manju Warrier
- Manjula
- Manjula Vijayakumar
- Manorama
- Mantra
- Manushi Chhillar
- Manya
- Masumeh Makhija
- Mawra Hocane
- Mayuri Kango
- Meena
- Meena Kumari
- Medha Shankr
- Meenakshi
- Meenakshi
- Meenakshi Dixit
- Meenakshi Chaudhary
- Meenakshi Seshadri
- Meenakshi Shirodkar
- Meera
- Meera Chopra
- Meera Jasmine
- Meera Nandan
- Meera Syal
- Meera Vasudevan
- Mehreen Pirzada
- Megha Akash
- Meghana Gaonkar
- Meghna Naidu
- Meghana Raj
- Meher Vij
- Merle Oberon
- Mia Uyeda
- Minissha Lamba
- Mini Mathur
- Mink Brar
- Mita Vashisht
- Mishti
- Mithila Palkar
- Mithra Kurian
- Moloya Goswami
- Momal Sheikh
- Monalisa
- Mohini (Tamil actress)
- Mona Singh
- Monali Thakur
- Monica
- Monica Bedi
- Monisha Unni
- Moon Moon Sen
- Mouni Roy
- Moushumi Chatterji
- Mrinal Dev-Kulkarni
- Mrinalini Sharma
- Mrunal Thakur
- Mrunmayee Deshpande
- Mukta Barve
- Mucherla Aruna
- Mumaith Khan
- Mumtaj
- Mumtaz
- Mumtaz Shanti
- Mumtaz Sorcar
- Mugdha Godse
- Munmun Dutta
- Mugdha Chaphekar
- Muskaan Mihani
- Mynavathi

== N ==
- Nabha Natesh
- Nadira
- Nadiya Moidu
- Nagma
- Nalini
- Nalini Jaywant
- Namrata Shirodkar
- Namrata Thapa
- Namitha
- Namitha Pramod
- Nanda
- Nandana Sen
- Nandita Chandra
- Nandita Swetha
- Nandita Das
- Nargis (Now Nargis Dutt)
- Nargis Fakhri
- Nathalia Kaur
- Nauheed Cyrusi
- Nausheen Sardar Ali
- Navaneet Kaur
- Navneet Kaur Dhillon
- Navya Nair
- Nayanthara
- Nazriya Nazim
- Neelam
- Neelam Verma
- Neelima Azeem
- Neena Gupta
- Neena Kulkarni
- Neha Bamb
- Neha Dhupia
- Neha Hinge
- Neha Khan
- Neha Shetty
- Neha Mahajan
- Neha Oberoi
- Neha Sharma
- Neeru Bajwa
- Neethu
- Neetu Chandra
- Neetu Singh
- Nethra Raghuraman
- Nia Sharma
- Nicolette Bird
- Nidhhi Agerwal
- Nidhi Subbaiah
- Niharika Konidela
- Niharika Singh
- Niharica Raizada
- Nikesha Patel
- Nikhat Khan
- Niki Aneja
- Nikita Anand
- Nikita J Palekar
- Nikita Dutta
- Nikita Thukral
- Nikita Sharma
- Nikki Galrani
- Nikki Tamboli
- Meera Chopra (credited as Nila)
- Nimisha Sajayan
- Nimmi
- Nimrit Kaur Ahluwalia
- Nirmala Chennappa
- Nirupa Roy
- Nirmalamma
- Nirosha
- Nisha Agarwal
- Nisha Kothari
- Nisha Ravikrishnan
- Shantipriya (credited as Nishanthi)
- Nishi
- Nishita Goswami
- Nithya Das
- Nithya Menen
- Nivedita Jain
- Nivedita Joshi Saraf
- Nivetha Thomas
- Nivetha Pethuraj
- Noor Jehan
- Nora Fatehi
- Nutan
- Nimrat Kaur
- Nushrat Bharucha
- Nathalia Kaur
- Nyla Usha

== O ==
- Oviya Helen

== P ==
- Padmapriya
- Padma Khanna
- Padma Kumta
- Padma Lakshmi
- Padma Vasanthi
- Padmaja Rao
- Padmini Kolhapure
- Padmini
- Padmavati Rao
- Palak Tiwari
- Pallavi Joshi
- Pallavi Kulkarni
- Pallavi Subhash
- Pallavi Sharda
- Palomi Ghosh
- Panchi Bora
- Pandari Bai
- Pankhuri Awasthy
- Pakhi Tyrewala
- Paoli Dam
- Parineeti Chopra
- Parminder Nagra
- Parul Chauhan
- Parul Gulati
- Parul Yadav
- Parvathy Jayaram
- Parvathy Nair
- Parvathy Omanakuttan
- Parvati Melton
- Parvathy Thiruvothu
- Parveen Babi
- Patience Cooper
- Patralekha
- Payal Rohatgi
- Payel Sarkar
- Payal Rajput
- Payal Ghosh
- Perizaad Zorabian
- Pia Bajpai
- Plabita Borthakur
- Pooja Batra
- Pooja Bedi
- Pooja Bhatt
- Pooja Chopra
- Pooja Gandhi
- Pooja Gor
- Pooja Hegde
- Pooja Kanwal
- Pooja Lokesh
- Pooja Sawant
- Pooja Umashankar
- Poonam Bajwa
- Poonam Dhillon
- Poonam Kaur
- Poonam Pandey
- Poornima Bhagyaraj
- Poornima Rao
- Prayaga Martin
- Prachi Desai
- Prachi Shah
- Pramila Joshai
- Pratibha Sinha
- Pranitha Subhash
- Pranutan Bahl
- Prarthana Behere
- Prastuti Parashar
- Preetha Vijayakumar
- Preeti Jhangiani
- Preity Mukhundhan
- Preity Zinta
- Prema
- Prema Narayan
- Priti Sapru
- Priya Anand
- Priya Bapat
- Priya Prakash Varrier
- Priya Gill
- Priya Lal
- Priya Raman
- Priya Rajvansh
- Priya Bhavani Shankar
- Priya Wal
- Priyamani
- Priyanka Bassi
- Priyanka Chopra Jonas
- Priyanka Arul Mohan
- Priyanka Kothari (Now Nisha Kotahri)
- Priyanka Nair
- Priyanka Trivedi
- Preetika Rao
- Puja Gupta
- Puja Banerjee
- Purbi Joshi

== R ==
- Rakhee Gulzar
- Radhika Apte
- Radhika Madan
- Radhika Sarathkumar
- Rachana Narayanankutty
- Rachna Banerjee
- Radha
- Radha Saluja
- Radhika Chaudhari
- Radhika Kumaraswamy
- Radhika Pandit
- Ragini
- Ragini Dwivedi
- Raasi (actress)
- Ragini Khanna
- Raima Sen
- Rajisha Vijayan
- Rajshree
- Rajshri Deshpande
- Rakhi Sawant
- Rakul Preet Singh
- Rakshita
- Raashii Khanna
- Rambha
- Rameshwari
- Ranjeeta Kaur
- Ranjitha
- Rajini
- Rani Mukerji
- Ramya
- Ramya Barna
- Ramya Krishnan
- Ravali
- Ramya Sri
- Ramya Nambeesan
- Rashi Khanna
- Rashi Singh
- Rashi Mal
- Rashmi
- Rashmi Desai
- Rashmi Gautam
- Rashmika Mandanna
- Ratan Rajput
- Rati Agnihotri
- Rati Pandey
- Rathi Arumugam
- Ratna Pathak Shah
- Raveena Tandon
- Reena Roy
- Reema Lagoo
- Reema Sen
- Regina Cassandra
- Rekha
- Rekha, also known as Josephine
- Rekha Das
- Rekha Rana
- Rekha Vedavyas
- Reenu Mathews
- Renuka Menon
- Renu Desai
- Reba Monica John
- Renukamma Murugodu
- Renuka Shahane
- Revathi
- Rhea Chakraborty
- Ritu Varma
- Richa Ahuja
- Richa Chaddha
- Richa Gangopadhyay
- Richa Pallod
- Richa Panai
- Richa Sharma
- Ridhi Dogra
- Rima Kallingal
- Rimi Sen
- Rimi Tomy
- Rinke Khanna
- Rinku Rajguru
- Rita Bhaduri
- Ritika Singh
- Rituparna Sengupta
- Riya Sen
- Rohini Hattangadi
- Rohini
- Roja
- Roja Ramani
- Roma
- Roopa Ganguly
- Roopa Iyer
- Roopa Koduvayur
- Roshni Chopra
- R.T. Rama
- Ruby Myers
- Ruby Parihar
- Rucha Gujarathi
- Rupini
- Rupali Ganguly
- Ranjana Deshmukh

== S ==
- Sarada (actress)
- Sabitri Chatterjee
- Saba Qamar
- Saba Azad
- Shivaleeka Oberoi
- Sobhita Dhulipala
- S. Varalakshmi
- Sadha
- Sadhana Shivdasani
- Sadia Khateeb
- Sagarika Ghatge
- Sagarika Mukherjee
- Sana Althaf
- Sana Makbul
- Sandhya (born 1924)
- Sandhya (born 1988)
- Sai Lokur
- Saiyami Kher
- Samyuktha Menon
- Samskruthy Shenoy
- Samyuktha Hegde
- Sandeepa Dhar
- Sandhya
- Sandhya Mridul
- Sandhya Roy
- Sanaya Irani
- Sanya Malhotra
- Saniya Anklesaria
- Sanjeeda Sheikh
- Sakshi Choudhary
- Sakshi Shivanand
- Sakshi Tanwar
- Sai Pallavi
- Sai Tamhankar
- Saira Banu
- Salma Agha
- Saloni Aswani
- Samantha Ruth Prabhu
- Samiksha
- Sameera Reddy
- Samvrutha Sunil
- Sana Amin Sheikh
- Sara Arjun
- Sana Khan
- Sana Saeed
- Sangeetha Krish
- Sanchita Padukone
- Sandeepa Dhar
- Sangeeta Bijlani
- Sandra Amy
- Sanober Kabir
- Sandali Sinha
- Sanghavi
- Sanjjanaa
- Sanjana Gandhi (now Pooja Gandhi)
- Santoshi
- Sara Khan
- Sara Ali Khan
- Sarah Jane Dias
- Sara Loren
- Saranya Mohan
- Saranya Ponvannan
- Sarayu (actress)
- Sarika
- Saritha
- Saroja Devi
- Satarupa Pyne
- Sathyabhama
- Saumya Tandon
- Savitri
- Sayali Bhagat
- Sayani Gupta
- Sayyeshaa Saigal
- Seerat Kapoor
- Seema Biswas
- Seema Pahwa
- Seema Shinde
- Seetha
- Shabana Azmi
- Shalini (Baby Shalini)
- Shamili (Baby Shamili)
- Shahana Goswami
- Sharmila Mandre
- Sharmilee
- Shibani Dandekar
- Shreya Narayan
- Shakeela
- Shalini Pandey
- Shamita Shetty
- Shanthamma
- Shantipriya (also Nishanthi)
- Sharmila Tagore
- Shashikala
- Shazahn Padamsee
- Sheeba Chadha
- Sheela
- Sheela Kaur
- Sheena Bajaj
- Sheena Chohan
- Sheena Shahabadi
- Shenaz Treasurywala
- Sherin
- Sherlyn Chopra (Mona Chopra)
- Shilpa Saklani Agnihotri
- Shilpa Shetty
- Shilpa Shukla
- Shilpa Shirodkar
- Shilpa Tulaskar
- Shilpa Anand
- Shilpi Sharma
- Shivani Raghuvanshi
- Shivangi Khedkar
- Shivangi Joshi
- Shreya Dhanwanthary
- Shruti Naidu
- Shylaja Nag
- Shweta Basu Prasad
- Shweta Bhardwaj
- Shweta Menon
- Shweta Gulati
- Shweta Tiwari
- Shweta Tripathi
- Shobhana
- Shobhna Samarth
- Shraddha Arya
- Shraddha Das
- Shraddha Kapoor
- Shraddha Srinath
- Shruthi Haasan
- Shruti Sodhi
- Shruti
- Shruti Seth
- Shruti Sharma
- Shritha Sivadas
- Shriya Saran
- Shriya Pilgaonkar
- Shriya Sharma
- Shubha Poonja
- Shubha Khote
- Shubhangi Atre Poorey
- Shyama (Khurshid Akhtar)
- Shylashri
- Sihi Kahi Geetha
- Sija Rose
- Simi Garewal
- Simone Singh
- Simple Kapadia
- Simple Kaur
- Simran Mundi
- Simran Bagga
- Sindhu
- Sindhu Tolani
- Sindhu Menon
- Silk Smitha
- Sithara
- Smita Patil
- Smriti Irani (Smriti Malhotra)
- Smriti Kalra
- Sneha Ullal
- Sneha
- Snigdha Akolkar
- Soha Ali Khan
- Sonakshi Sinha
- Sonali Bendre
- Sonali Kulkarni
- Sonali Raut
- Sonalee Kulkarni
- Sonal Chauhan
- Sonam (actress)
- Sonam Bajwa
- Sonam Kapoor
- Sonalika Joshi
- Sonarika Bhadoria
- Sonia Agarwal
- Sonia Rathee
- Sonnalli Seygall
- Sonu
- Sonu Walia
- Sophia Chaudhary
- Soundarya
- Sowcar Janaki
- Spruha Joshi
- Srabanti Chatterjee
- Sreeleela
- Sridevi (Now Sridevi Kapoor)
- Sriti Jha
- Sri Divya
- Srividya
- Sripriya
- Subbulakshmi
- Subhashri
- Suchitra
- Suchitra Krishnamurthy
- Suchitra Pillai
- Suchitra Sen
- Sunitha / Vidhyasri
- Sudha Belawadi
- Sudha Chandran
- Sudha Rani
- Sudha Narasimharaju
- Sudharani Jena
- Sudipta Chakraborty
- Suhasi Goradia Dhami
- Suhasini
- Sujatha
- Sukirti Kandpal
- Sukumari
- Sulakshana Pandit
- Sulochana Latkar
- Sumalatha
- Suman Nagarkar
- Suman Ranganathan
- Sumithra
- Sumitra Devi
- Sunaina
- Sunny Leone
- Surbhi Chandna
- Surbhi Jyoti
- Supriya Devi
- Supriya Pathak
- Supriya Pilgaonkar
- Supriya Shukla
- Suraiya
- Surveen Chawla
- Suryakantham
- Sushma Reddy
- Sushmita Sen
- Sushama Shiromanee
- Sumalatha
- Suvalakshmi
- Swati Reddy
- Swapna
- Swaroop Sampat
- Swastika Mukherjee
- Srinidhi Shetty
- Swara Bhaskar
- Suzanna Mukherjee

== T ==
- Tabu
- Tahira Kochhar
- Tanaaz Irani
- Tanisha
- Tanushree Dutta
- Tanuja
- Tanu Roy
- Tanvi Azmi
- Tamannaah Bhatia
- Tannishtha Chatterjee
- Taapsee Pannu
- Tara
- Tara Anuradha
- Tara Deshpande
- Tara D'Souza
- Tara Sharma
- Tarana Raja
- Taruni Sachdev
- Tejaswi Madivada
- Tena Desae
- Tia Bajpai
- Tillotama Shome
- Tina Munim (now Tina Ambani)
- Tina Datta
- Tisca Chopra
- Tridha Choudhury
- Tripti Dimri
- Tripuramba
- T. P. Rajalakshmi
- T. R. Rajakumari
- Trisha Krishnan
- Tulip Joshi
- Tun Tun
- Twinkle Khanna
- Tara Alisha Berry
- Tara Sutaria

== U ==
- Udhayathara
- Udaya Chandrika
- Udita Goswami
- Ujjwala Raut
- Uma
- Uma Padmanabhan
- Umasashi
- Umashree
- Unni Mary
- Usha Chavan
- Urfi Javed
- Urmila Matondkar
- Urmila Kanitkar
- Urvashi
- Urvashi Dholakia
- Urvashi Sharma
- Usha Kiran
- Usha Nadkarni
- Usha Naik
- Ulka Gupta
- Upasna Singh
- Urvashi Rautela

== V ==
- Vaani Kapoor
- Vanitha Vijayakumar
- Vadivukkarasi
- Vaidehi Parashurami
- Vaishali Desai
- Vaishali Kasaravalli
- Vandana Gupte
- Vanishree
- Vanisri
- Vani Bhojan
- Vani Viswanath
- Vanitha Vasu
- Vaishnavi Mahant
- Vaishnavi Chaitanya
- Vrushika Mehta
- Varalaxmi Sarathkumar
- Varsha Bollamma
- Varsha Usgaonkar
- Vasundhara Das
- Vedika Pinto
- Vedhika
- Veda Sastry
- Veena Malik
- Veena Sundar
- Vineetha
- Veena
- Vega Tamotia
- Vibha Chibber
- Vidhubala
- Vidya Balan
- Vithika Sheru
- Vidya Malvade
- Vidya Sinha
- Vishakha Singh
- Vijeta Pandit
- Vijayalakshmi
- Vijayalakshmi Singh
- Vijayashanti
- Vimala Raman
- Vinaya Prasad
- Vyjayantimala

== W ==
- Waheeda Rehman
- Wamiqa Gabbi
- Warina Hussain
- Waluscha De Sousa

== Y ==
- Yagna Shetty
- Yami Gautam
- Yamuna (actress)
- Yashaswini Dayama
- Yogeeta Bali
- Yana Gupta
- Yukta Mookhey
- Yuvika Chaudhary

== Z ==
- Zaheeda Hussain
- Zaheera
- Zaira Wasim
- Zarina Wahab
- Zarine Khan
- Zeenat Aman
- Zoa Morani
- Zoya Afroz
- Zoya Hussain
- Zubeida

== See also ==
- List of Hindi film actresses
- List of Tamil film actresses
- List of Telugu film actresses
- List of Kannada film actresses
- List of Marathi film actresses
- List of Punjabi cinema actresses
- List of Bhojpuri film actresses
- List of Bengali actresses
- List of Indian television actresses
- List of Indian film actors
- List of Hindi film actors
- Lists of actresses
