= Kahin Diyaa Jale Kahin Jiyaa =

- Created by: Karnik Media & Communications
- Directed by: Ashish Patil
- Starring: see below
- Opening theme: "Kahin Diyaa Jale Kahin Jiyaa" by Mahalaxmi Iyer
- Country of origin: India
- Original language: Hindi
- No. of seasons: 1
- No. of episodes: 104

Production
- Producer: Reena Wadhwa
- Editor: Manish Mistry
- Running time: approx. 23 minutes

Original release
- Network: Sony TV
- Release: 7 May – 1 November 2001

Kahin Diyaa Jale Kahin Jiyaa (transl. Somewhere burn lamp, somewhere heart) is an Indian soap opera which aired on Sony TV.

== Plot ==
The show was the story of a wealthy Rajvansh family whose scion, Rohit (Mukul Dev), gets engaged to Payal (Prachi Shah), a girl of another prominent family.

The entire Rajput community thinks this is a match made in heaven, but Rohit doesn't. That's because he was madly in love with Suhasini (Reena Wadhwa), who suddenly broke the relationship because she found out she couldn't conceive.

Unaware of all this, Payal marries Rohit, looking forward to a life of bliss. But her dreams are shattered. She soon discovers her mother-in-law wanted Suhasini for a bahu, but the yearning for a grandson was so strong that she had to accept Payal.

Even as Payal struggles to win Rohit over, the Rajvansh family is shocked by a discovery about her past. What will she do? What can she do, trapped as she is in a loveless marriage and scorned by her mother-in-law? Will Suhasini's shadow keep falling on her life? Faced with so many dilemmas, Payal loses hope, but all may not be lost.

== Cast ==
- Mukul Dev ... Rohit Rajvansh
- Reena Wadhwa ... Suhasini
- Rajeeta Kochhar ... Rohit's mother
- Prachi Shah ... Payal
- Aruna Sangal
- Usha Bachani
- Adi Irani
- Sajni Hanspal ... Gehna, elder sister of Payal
- Sanjay Swaraj
- Sujata Thakkar ... Rohit's elder sister
