= Thaandavam (soundtrack) =

Soundtrack album by G. V. Prakash Kumar
- Released: 15 August 2012
- Genre: Feature film soundtrack
- Length: 29:30
- Language: Tamil
- Label: Junglee Music
- Producer: G. V. Prakash Kumar

G. V. Prakash Kumar chronology
Joker (2012)	Thaandavam (2012)	Paradesi (2012)

Thaandavam is the soundtrack to the 2012 Tamil-language film of the same name directed by A. L. Vijay, starring Vikram. The film's musical score is composed by G. V. Prakash Kumar in his 25th film and the album consists of seven songs written by Na. Muthukumar and an instrumental track. The album was released at a launch event held in Chennai on 15 August 2012 coinciding Independence Day and the soundtrack was marketed to digital platforms and CDs through Junglee Music label.

== Development ==
Thaandavam is Prakash's fourth collaboration with Vijay after Kireedam (2007), Madrasapattinam (2010) and Deiva Thirumagal (2011). Like the previous films, Prakash said that there are five songs in the film which would be "melodious and romantic". He used the piano for the theme music and another bit song that would total up to eight in number. However, the film would also consist of "stylish action music".

When Vijay was scouting locations abroad, Prakash sent the tunes for the film via video conferencing through Skype. The song "Oru Paadhi Kadhavu" was initially written for Madrasapattinam that had not been used. During a flight trip to Kerala, Vijay and Prakash casually discussed about a romantic number, resulting the unused track came into the way for this film. Throughout the discussion, Prakash structured the entire song on the flight. The song marked the debut of playback singer Vandana Srinivasan who performed with the counterpart singer Haricharan.

Three of the film's songs had been composed after the lyrics were written. Alyssa Mendonsa, the daughter of Loy Mendonsa from the Shankar–Ehsaan–Loy trio was introduced in the track "Will You Be There". S. P. Balasubrahmanyam, Saindhavi, Sathya Prakash, Rahul Nambiar, Chinnaponnu, Velmurugan and Megha performed the tracks, with Prakash performing two of them.

== Release ==
The music rights were secured by Junglee Music. On 22 July 2012, the track list was updated through social media consisting of eight tracks in total. The following day, G. Dhananjayan, executive producer and head of distribution at UTV Motion Pictures, confirmed that the film's music would be launched on Independence Day (15 August 2012), and an online contest was held for fans to participate in the audio launch. The invitation was designed with the seven tandavas of Lord Shiva along with stills from the film. The event was held at the Chennai Trade Centre in Nandambakkam, with the cast and crew (excluding Anushka and Santhanam) along with other prominent directors and actors in attendance. The organisers also arranged for action games like rope climbing and shooting as an innovative approach.

== Track listing ==
No.	Title	Singer(s)	Length
1.	"Yaaradi Mohini"	Rahul Nambiar, Megha	04:29
2.	"Will You Be There"	Alyssa, Marie	04:02
3.	"Uyirin Uyire"	Saindhavi, Sathya Prakash, G. V. Prakash Kumar	05:45
4.	"Shiva Thaandavam"	S. P. Balasubrahmanyam	02:15
5.	"Oru Paadhi Kadhavu"	Haricharan, Vandana Srinivasan	05:38
6.	"Anicham Poovazhagi"	G. V. Prakash Kumar, Chinnaponnu, Velmurugan	04:57
7.	"Adhigaalai Pookkal"	G. V. Prakash Kumar	01:05
8.	"A Poem for You"	G. V. Prakash Kumar	01:19
Total length:			29:30

== Reception ==
Behindwoods rated two-and-a-half stars out of five, saying "Though definitely a good job, it doesn't match up to some of the young composer’s previous works like Mayakkam Enna and Aadukalam." Moviecrow gave 6.5/10 to the album, saying "The songs may not get you on a repeat mode right away. But, the songs are expected to get better with director Vijay and Nirav Shah's skillful picturization on terrific Chiyaan, pretty Amy and demure Anushka set in beautiful locales." Critic based at News18 called it as "a fairly good compilation of songs [...] But, the kind of intensity we saw from GV in Aadukalam and Mayakkam Enna are missing. It won't be a surprise if any of these numbers don't become cult classics. However, the progress this man has shown over 25 movies is remarkable and deserves applause." Karthik Srinivasan of Milliblog wrote "High on melody, Thaandavam is a poised effort from GVP!"

== Accolades ==
Award	Date of ceremony (Note: Date is linked to the article about the awards held that year, wherever possible.)	Category	Recipient(s) and nominee(s)	Result	Ref.
Filmfare Awards South	20 July 2013	Best Music Director – Tamil	G. V. Prakash Kumar	Won	
Mirchi Music Awards South	26 August 2013	Album of the Year	G. V. Prakash Kumar	Won	
Mirchi Music Awards South	26 August 2013	Male Vocalist of the Year	Haricharan for "Oru Paadhi Kadhavu"	Nominated	
Mirchi Music Awards South	26 August 2013	Music Composer of the Year	G. V. Prakash Kumar for "Oru Paadhi Kadhavu"	Nominated	
Mirchi Music Awards South	26 August 2013	Lyricist of the Year	Na. Muthukumar for "Oru Paadhi Kadhavu"	Nominated	
Mirchi Music Awards South	26 August 2013	Upcoming Female Vocalist of the Year	Vandana Srinivasan for "Oru Paadhi Kadhavu"	Nominated	
South Indian International Movie Awards	12–13 September 2013	Best Lyricist – Tamil	Na. Muthukumar for "Oru Paadhi Kadhavu"	Nominated	
South Indian International Movie Awards	12–13 September 2013	Best Female Playback Singer – Tamil	Saindhavi for "Uyirin Uyire"	Nominated	
Vijay Awards	11 May 2013	Best Lyricist	Na. Muthukumar for "Oru Paadhi Kadhavu"	Nominated	
