= Mum Bhai =

- Written by: Chintan Gandhi; Apoorva Lakhia; Raj Vasant
- Directed by: Akshay Choubey
- Starring: Angad Bedi; Sandeepa Dhar; Sikandar Kher; Sunny Hinduja
- Music by: Harshwardhan Dixit
- Country of origin: India
- Original language: Hindi
- No. of seasons: 1
- No. of episodes: 12

Production
- Producer: Balaji Telefilms
- Running time: 260 min

Original release
- Network: ZEE5 ALT Balaji
- Release: 12 November 2020

Mum Bhai is a Hindi-language Indian crime thriller web series. It is directed by Akshay Choubey and produced by Balaji Telefilms. The series features Angad Bedi, Sandeepa Dhar, Sikandar Kher and Sunny Hinduja. It showcases Bhaskar Shetty, a maverick cop and his rise to power. The series was digitally released on both ZEE5 and ALT Balaji on November 12, 2020

== Plot ==
The story revolves around Bhaskar Shetty (Angad Bedi), who emerges as a top encounter specialist in Mumbai. The series highlights his journey and passion to rule the city on his terms. Neha Dobi was also in the show.

== Cast ==
- Angad Bedi as Bhaskar Shetty
- Sandeepa Dhar as Vaishnavi
- Sikandar Kher as Rama Shetty
- Priyank Sharma as Pridhvi
- Karmveer Choudhary as Minister Chavan
- Sunny Hinduja as Zaheer
- Sameer Dharmadhikari as Officer Karekar
- Madhurima Roy as Ranjana

== Episodes ==
No.	Title	Directed by	Written by	Original release date
1	"Acha Logo Ka Suraksha, Criminal Ka Khatma"	Akshay Choubey	Chintan Gandhi, Apoorva Lakhia, Raj Vasant	November 12, 2020
2	"Peeth Peeche Kabhi Nahi Maarne Ka"	Akshay Choubey	Chintan Gandhi, Apoorva Lakhia, Raj Vasant	November 12, 2020
3	"Bhaskar Shetty – Naam Yaad Rakhna"	Akshay Choubey	Chintan Gandhi, Apoorva Lakhia, Raj Vasant	November 12, 2020
4	"ATS Ka Kumble Nikla"	Akshay Choubey	Chintan Gandhi, Apoorva Lakhia, Raj Vasant	November 12, 2020
5	"Mera Mumbai Ka Kaam Sambhalega"	Akshay Choubey	Chintan Gandhi, Apoorva Lakhia, Raj Vasant	November 12, 2020
6	"Kal Noto Se Bhari Gaadi, Aaj Puri Plate Khali"	Akshay Choubey	Chintan Gandhi, Apoorva Lakhia, Raj Vasant	November 12, 2020
7	"Apna Promise Yaad Hai Anna?"	Akshay Choubey	Chintan Gandhi, Apoorva Lakhia, Raj Vasant	November 12, 2020
8	"Aaj Kuch Bada Kaand Hoga "	Akshay Choubey	Chintan Gandhi, Apoorva Lakhia, Raj Vasant	November 12, 2020
9	"Bhaskar Tere Ko Sab Kuch nahi Maloom"	Akshay Choubey	Chintan Gandhi, Apoorva Lakhia, Raj Vasant	November 12, 2020
10	"Saanp Hai Jo Kisi Ka Nahi Hota"	Akshay Choubey	Chintan Gandhi, Apoorva Lakhia, Raj Vasant	November 12, 2020
11	"Officer On Special Duty"	Akshay Choubey	Chintan Gandhi, Apoorva Lakhia, Raj Vasant	November 12, 2020
12	"Kya Solid Planning Kiya Hai "	Akshay Choubey	Chintan Gandhi, Apoorva Lakhia, Raj Vasant	November 12, 2020

== Release ==
The series was digitally released on both ZEE5 and ALT Balaji on November 12, 2025.

== Reception ==
Archika Khurana from Times Of India stated that Angad Bedi's performance in the series makes the gangster sequences more realistic. Udita Jhunjhunwala from Firstpost summed up the series review stating that Angad Bedi's crime series is a beautiful amalgamation of every Indian gangster movie.

Heer Kothari from Free express journal stated that individual acting brilliance of the actors in the series makes it watchable. Pakaoo gave the series a mixed review and highlighted that the series missed a lot of key components.
