= Shruti Ulfat =

Indian television actress

Shruti Panwar
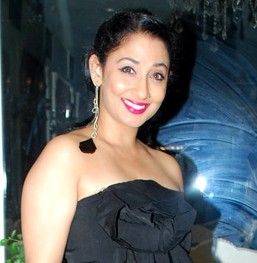
- Shruti Panwar in 2015
- Born: Shruti Panwar; Dehradun, Uttarakhand, India
- Occupation: Actress
- Years active: 1997–present
- Spouse: Alok Ulfat (m. 1997; div. 2017)
- Children: Ojasya Ulfat (son)

Shruti Panwar, formerly known as Shruti Ulfat, is an Indian film and television actress. She hosted DD National's Stree Shakti and Saab Ji.

== Films ==
| Year | Title | Role | Notes |
|---|---|---|---|
| 1997 | Dil To Pagal Hai | Shruti | |
| 1999 | Sar Ankhon Par | Babli | |
| 1999 | Yeh Hai Mumbai Meri Jaan | Herself | Dancer at Parsi party |
| 2002 | Raaz | Priya | |
| 2002 | Pardesi Re | | |
| 2004 | Aetbaar | Sanjana | |
| 2006 | Gafla | Vidya | |
| 2015 | Mr. X | Madhuri | Special appearance |
| 2021 | Sooryavanshi | Nafeesa Hafeez | |
| 2024 | Tera Kya Hoga Lovely | | |

=== Television ===
| Year | Title | Role | Notes |
|---|---|---|---|
| 1998–1999 | I Love You | Simran | |
| 1998–1999 | Thoda Hai Thode Ki Zaroorat Hai | | |
| 1999 | Saturday Suspense | | |
| 1999 | Dil Hai Ki Manta Nahin | Nikki | |
| 2000 | Rishtey | | |
| 2004–2005 | Hum 2 Hain Na | Anjali | |
| 2004–2005 | Aaj Ke Shrimaan Shrimati | Sania Sarfare | |
| 2010 | Ishaan: Sapno Ko Awaaz De | Ishaan's mother | |
| 2010–2012 | Sasural Genda Phool | Rano Kashyap | |
| 2012 | Mujhse Kuchh Kehti...Yeh Khamoshiyaan | Gauri's adoptive mother | |
| 2013 | Savdhaan India | | Episodic role |
| 2014–2016 | Jamai Raja | Simran Khurana | |
| 2016–2017 | Naagarjuna – Ek Yoddha | Yashodha Shastri | |
| 2017–2018 | Naamkarann | Shweta Khanna | |
| 2018 | Box Cricket League | Contestant | Captain of Lucknow Nawabs |
| 2018–2019 | Dastaan-E-Mohabbat Salim Anarkali | Jhillan | |
| 2019 | Nimki Vidhayak | Ganga Devi | |
| 2021 | Pinjara Khubsurti Ka | Vishaka aka Vish | |
| 2021–2022 | Sasural Genda Phool 2 | Rano Kashyap | |
| 2022–2023 | Punyashlok Ahilyabai | Maharani Gautama Malharrao Holkar | |
| 2023–present | Yeh Rishta Kya Kehlata Hai | Vidya Poddar | |
