= Calendar Girls (2015 film) =

2015 film by Madhur Bhandarkar

- Theatrical release poster
- Directed by: Madhur Bhandarkar
- Written by: Madhur Bhandarkar
- Produced by: Sangeeta Ahir; Bhandarkar Entertainment
- Starring: Akanksha Puri; Avani Modi; Kyra Dutt; Ruhi Singh; Satarupa Pyne
- Cinematography: Hari K. Vedantam
- Edited by: Aarif Sheikh; Aarti Bajaj; Vipul Chouhan
- Music by: Meet Bros Anjjan; Amaal Mallik
- Production companies: Bhandarkar Entertainment; Mangl Murti Films
- Distributed by: Raksha Entertainment
- Release date: 25 September 2015
- Country: India
- Language: Hindi
- Budget: ₹130 million
- Box office: est. ₹58.95 million

Calendar Girls is a 2015 Indian Hindi-language drama film directed by Madhur Bhandarkar and co-produced by Sangeeta Ahir and Bhandarkar Entertainment. Akanksha Puri played the main female lead role. The film's music was composed by Meet Bros Anjjan and Amaal Mallik. The film was released on 25 September 2015. According to Bhandarkar, the story of Calendar Girls is 75% reality and 25% fiction.

== Plot ==
The plot begins with photographer Timmy Anand (Rohit Roy) calling the five girls he has chosen from different parts of India: Mayuri Chauhan (Ruhi Singh) from Rohtak, Paroma Ghosh (Satarupa Pyne) from Kolkata, Nandita Menon (Akanksha Puri) from Hyderabad, Nazneen Malik (Avani Modi) from Lahore, and Sharon Pinto (Kyra Dutt) from Goa. They have been invited to Mumbai to take part in a photoshoot for the country's most prestigious annual calendar, a project initiated by business tycoon Kumar Kukreja (Suhel Seth) and Timmy.

The story now shifts its focus to offer an insight into the personal lives of the five girls. Hailing from Rohtak, Mayuri lives with her supportive and encouraging parents, who are happy for her to become a calendar girl. In contrast, Paroma's parents and older brother disapprove of her becoming a model. She has left home and plans to call them from Mumbai one day to prove that she can make them proud. Nandita, who is from Hyderabad, has parents and an older sister. They are all high achievers: her mum and dad are company CEOs and her sister, Sharda (Samiksha Batnagar), has recently become the company's youngest vice president. Nandita has decided to make it big by becoming a calendar girl. Nazneen, who is from Lahore, lives with her boyfriend, Inzamam, played by Deepak Wadhwa, and feels that she has achieved little in life. She believes that becoming a calendar girl will provide her with a platform to break into Bollywood. However, Inzamam is not supportive of this, so she leaves him. Sharon, who is from Goa, is jogging on the beach with a friend when she hears how bad the glamour industry is and is advised against entering it. Nevertheless, she does not believe the rumours and decides to go ahead anyway.

The five girls are travelling to Mauritius to take part in a photoshoot with Timmy. They will also attend the launch party for the calendar, where they will have the opportunity to meet people from the glamour industry.

The story then jumps forward three months. Paroma is the guest of honour at a Bengali puja organised by a pandal, where she runs into her ex-boyfriend from Kolkata, Pinaki Chatterjee (played by Keith Sequeira). Pinaki persuades Paroma to give their relationship another chance, and she agrees. Meanwhile, Sharon is thrilled to have chosen Aniruddh Shroff (played by Rushad Rana) to help with her film projects. Meanwhile, Nazneen has received an offer to appear in a Bollywood film from a renowned producer. On her first day of filming, Mayuri is advised by her secretary, Tiwariji (Atul Parchure), to impress the crew right from the outset. She befriends the director and crew, using her social networking skills to tweet about the film several times and generate good publicity. Meanwhile, Nandita attends a ceremony in Jodhpur, where she chats with Naina (Suchitra Pillai), a socialite. Naina declares that Nandita is one of her favourite calendar girls. She then introduces her to Harsh Narang (Vikram Sakhalkar), a major business tycoon and heir to the royal Narang family of Jodhpur. Harsh asks Nandita about her future plans. She replies that she is flying back to Mumbai the following morning. He advises her to cancel her flight and proposes marriage. Initially, Nandita doesn't answer, but her sister advises her to accept, saying that she would live a very comfortable life as a queen. After meeting Harsh's parents and informing them that she is quitting modelling, they give her a warm welcome and she and Harsh marry.

While travelling in a taxi, Nazneen sees roadside protests against Pakistani celebrities leaving the country. She is anxious about her safety and worried that the city is becoming more dangerous. She cannot return to London because Inzamam is furious with her. The producer who offered her the film role has withdrawn it due to this issue and cannot delay production. Nazneen loses the film role and becomes unemployed. A few days later, she meets Ananya Raichand (played by Mita Vashisht), who runs a high-class escort service for politicians, industrialists and diplomats. Nazneen ends up becoming an escort. Meanwhile, Sharon attends a party at a friend's house, where she meets Rehaan, a friend of Aniruddh's. He tells her about the rumours that Aniruddh has spread, claiming that she slept with him. She becomes very angry and slaps him in front of his entire office staff. Consequently, she is banned from the advertising industry and unable to secure any assignments. Meanwhile, Paroma is attending a party to which Pinaki has invited her. He introduces her to various cricketers and people from the SPL cricket league. Later, Pinaki tells her about some gambling issues he is facing, which were set to earn them millions of rupees. He asks Paroma to spend time with one of the cricketers on his terms. She agrees, and they make a lot of money from the SPL's daily matches. However, CBI officer Vignesh Pranjpe (played by Sharad Ponkshe) has his doubts about them and keeps a close eye on them.

Sharon meets Shashank Datta, played by Indraneil Sengupta, who works for a leading news channel. He offers her a presenting job on one of their new entertainment shows, and she goes on to enjoy great success in the role. Meanwhile, Mayuri signs a film contract worth millions of rupees with the son of a property developer, in exchange for an apartment. She later meets Madhur Bhandarkar, who offers her a role in one of his films. Nandita discovers that Harsh is cheating on her. He only married her to keep her as a trophy wife while sleeping with escorts. When she tells her in-laws, they cry with her but explain that Harsh loves her and that such behaviour is common among the wealthy Narang family.

Paroma is arrested by the CBI in connection with a betting and match-fixing case, leaving Pinaki in hiding and Paroma in a difficult situation. Her brother and father come to post bail for her and disown her. She attempts suicide, but stops when she receives an offer to appear on a reality show because of her controversial image. Nazneen feels ashamed of being an escort and wants to quit and return to London. She decides to work with a foreign diplomat one last time. However, she discovers that Inzamam has left her for someone else. After escaping from the hotel, Nazneen is involved in a car accident and dies.

Following these events involving the Calendar Girls, particularly Paroma and Nazneen, the question of whether the Calendar Girl industry offers a route into the glamour industry or constitutes exploitation has come to the fore. The other four Calendar Girls meet at Nazneen's funeral, where they learn that her body had been in the morgue for ten days before being claimed. They realise how the glamour world works, and that you have to live with it.

As the days and months pass, we find out what the Calendar Girls have been doing: Paroma has appeared on a reality show; Sharon has married Shashank; Mayuri received the Best Debutante Award at the Filmfare Awards; and Nandita is pregnant with Harsh's child. As the new year arrives, the old calendar is taken down and replaced with a new one featuring the five new Calendar Girls.

== Teaser ==
Suhel Seth and Rohit Roy played significant role in Calendar Girls. Five new actresses have made their debut in Hindi film industry with Calendar Girls. The teaser of Calendar Girls was released on 1 July 2015. The film's trailer was released on 17 August 2015. Calendar Girls was banned in Pakistan.

== Release ==
Calendar Girls was released on 25 September 2015.

== Cast ==
- Akanksha Puri as Nandita Menon, from Hyderabad
- Avani Modi as Nazneen Malik, from Lahore
- Kyra Dutt as Sharon Pinto, from Goa
- Ruhi Singh as Mayuri Chauhan, from Rohtak
- Satarupa Pyne as Paroma Ghosh, from Kolkata
- Keith Sequeira as Pinaki (Paroma's boyfriend)
- Deepak Wadhwa as Inzamam (Nazneen's boyfriend)
- Indraneil Sengupta as Shashank (Sharon's husband)
- Vikram Sakhalkar as Harsh Narang (Nandita's husband)
- Mita Vasisht as Escort broker
- Suhel Seth as Kumar Kukreja, calendar sponsor
- Rohit Roy as Timmy, Photographer Berak Celana, (called calendar partner in North America and Bruce Lee in UK)
- Karan Aanand as Paroma's brother
- Kiran Kumar as Narang's
- Atul Parchure as Tiwari Ji, Mayuri's secretary
- Madhur Bhandarkar (cameo) as himself
- Suchitra Pillai as Naina, Socialite
- Samikssha Batnagar as Nandita's sister
- Shishir Sharma as Mayuri's father
- Sharad Ponkshe as CBI officer
- Tanuj Virwani as Varun

== Soundtrack ==
Calendar Girls

Soundtrack album by: Amaal Mallik; Meet Bros Anjjan
- Released: 10 September 2015
- Genre: Feature film soundtrack
- Length: 21:58
- Label: T-Series

The music for the film was composed by Meet Bros Anjjan and Amaal Mallik, while the lyrics were by Kumaar. The full audio album was released on 10 September 2015 by T-Series.

No.	Title	Lyrics	Music	Singer(s)	Length
1.	"Awesome Mora Mahiya"	Kumaar	Meet Bros Anjjan	Meet Bros Anjjan, Khushboo Grewal	03:37
2.	"Khwaishein" (Rock Version)	Kumaar	Amaal Mallik	Arijit Singh	05:10
3.	"We Will Rock The World"	Kumaar	Meet Bros Anjjan	Neha Kakkar, Meet Bros Anjjan, Khushboo Grewal	04:11
4.	"Shaadi Wali Night"	Kumaar	Amaal Mallik	Aditi Singh Sharma	03:29
5.	"Khwaishein" (Film version)	Kumaar	Amaal Mallik	Armaan Malik	05:31
Total length:					21:58

== Critical reception ==
Bollywood Hungama rated the film three-and-a-half stars out of five, describing the five calendar girl characters as "very relatable". The site summarized, "On the whole, Calendar Girls can be watched for its wholesome entertainment value, hard hitting drama and engaging narrative." Subhash K. Jha rated the film three stars out of five, saying, "It is fairly engaging and sometimes powerful in its message on how far the ruthless metropolis takes the unsuspecting career girls before dumping them on the derrières to re-gather their destiny."

== See also ==
- Kingfisher Calendar
- Atul Kasbekar
