= Carry On Kesar =

- Directed by: Vipul Mehta
- Written by: Vipul Mehta
- Based on: Baane Gher Babo Aavyo by Ankit Trivedi
- Produced by: Kamlesh Bhuptani; Bhavna Sanjay Modi
- Starring: Supriya Pathak; Darshan Jariwala; Avani Modi; Rittesh Mobh; Archan Trivedi; Amish Tanna; Bhaskar Bhojak; Parth Thakar; Jason
- Cinematography: Pushkar Singh
- Edited by: Manish Mistry
- Music by: Rajiv Bhatt
- Production companies: Galactic Motion Pictures Pvt. Ltd and Manpasand Films
- Release date: 17 February 2017
- Running time: 120 minutes
- Country: India
- Language: Gujarati

Carry On Kesar is an Indian Gujarati social comedy film directed by Vipul Mehta. It is a socially relevant film that talks of a traditional elderly childless couple deciding to have a baby. It is a debut Gujarati film of actress Supriya Pathak Kapur. The cast includes Darshan Jariwala, Avani Modi and Rittesh Mobh in the lead roles.

== Plot ==
Shyamji (Darshan Jariwala) and Kesar Patel (Supriya Pathak), a traditional Gujarati elderly childless couple live in a small town in Gujarat. A fashion designer based in Paris, Annie (Avani Modi) comes across Kesar's artistic work and makes arrangement to learn the art from her. However, things don't go as planned and a twist of fate prompts Kesar to confront her past. The couple decides to have a child at an age where most couples are grandparents.

== Cast ==
- Supriya Pathak Kapur as Kesar Patel
- Darshan Jariwala as Shyamji Patel
- Avani Modi as Annie
- Rittesh Mobh as Dr. Pratik Joshi
- Arachan Trivedi as Odha Kaka
- Bhaskar Bhojak as Hitesh Patel
- Parth Thakar as Mitesh Patel
- Amish Tanna as Jignesh
- Olamilekan Akanbi Jason as John

== Release ==
Film released on 17 February 2017.

== Reception ==
The Times of India reviewed positively saying, "A complete family movie with impressive performances by Supriya Pathak and Darshan Jariwala." BuddyBits also reviewed positively stating it to be one of the must watch Gujarati films.
