= Fari Ek Vaar =

2025 Indian Gujarati family drama film

- Official Poster
- Directed by: Akhil Kotak
- Written by: Kajal Mehta
- Produced by: Vihaan Dand
- Starring: Supriya Pathak Kapur; Tiku Talsania; Netri Trivedi; Avani Modi; Utsav Naik
- Cinematography: Subrat K Khatoi
- Edited by: Apurva Motiwale
- Music by: Dharmadev Maniar; Kruz - Aghori Muzik
- Production companies: Madhu Entertainment and Media Pvt Ltd
- Distributed by: Rupam Entertainment Pvt Ltd
- Release date: 12 September 2025
- Running time: 128 minutes
- Country: India
- Language: Gujarati

Fari Ek Vaar is a 2025 Indian Gujarati family drama and comedy film directed by Akhil Kotak and written by Kajal Mehta. It Stars Supriya Pathak Kapur, Tiku Talsania, Netri Trivedi, Avani Modi, Utsav Naik, Morli Patel and others. Produced by Vihaan Dand, the film was released on 12 September 2025.

== Plot ==
Fari Ek Vaar is a story of hope, love and togetherness. It portrays a life that may not be perfect but is filled with love and support.

== Cast ==
- Supriya Pathak Kapur as Kusum
- Tiku Talsania as Rishikesh
- Netri Trivedi as Khushi
- Avani Modi as Lavanya
- Utsav Naik as Arjun
- Morli Patel as Sumitra
- Bharat Thakkar as Bipin
- Komal Panchal as Sonal

== Soundtrack ==
Fari Ek Vaar

Studio album by Dharmadev Maniar, Kruz - Aghori Muzik
- Released: 2025
- Genre: Feature film soundtrack
- Length: 11:39
- Language: Gujarati
- Label: Tips Music
External audio
- Fari Ek Vaar Full Album on JioSaavn

=== Tracklist ===
All lyrics are written by Sandipa Thesiya, K.Deep; all music is composed by Dharmadev Maniar, Kruz - Aghori Muzik

No.	Title	Lyrics	Music	Singer(s)	Length
1.	"O Saathi Re"	Sandipa Thesiya	Dharmadev Maniar	Garvit Soni, Helly Bhatt	04:23
2.	"Patan Thi Patola"	K.Deep	Kruz - Aghori Muzik	Anushka Pandit, Aghori Muzik	03:36
3.	"Fari Ek Vaar - Title Track"	Sandipa Thesiya	Dharmadev Maniar	Utsav Trivedi, Anushka Pandit	03:40
Total length:					11:39

== Production ==
The film was shot at various locations in Ahmedabad, Gujarat.

== Marketing and release ==
The film was officially announced on 3 June 2025. Its release date was confirmed on 16 July 2025. A teaser was unveiled on 4 August 2025, followed by the trailer, which was released on 25 August 2025 through various social media platforms.

== See also ==
- List of Gujarati films of 2025
- List of Gujarati films
