= Paradesi (soundtrack) =

Soundtrack album by G. V. Prakash Kumar
- Released: 25 November 2012
- Recorded: 2012
- Genre: Feature film soundtrack
- Length: 29:14
- Language: Tamil
- Label: Gemini Audio
- Producer: G. V. Prakash Kumar

G. V. Prakash Kumar chronology
| Thaandavam (2012) | Paradesi (2012) | Naan Rajavaga Pogiren (2012) |

Paradesi is the soundtrack album to the 2012 film of the same name directed by Bala, starring Atharvaa, Vedhika and Dhansika. The film's soundtrack consisted of five songs composed by G. V. Prakash Kumar with lyrics written by Vairamuthu. The soundtrack was released under the Gemini Audio label on 25 November 2012 and received acclaim from critics.

== Development ==
Paradesi is the maiden collaboration between Prakash and Bala, and also the latter's first film in which Vairamuthu served as the lyricist. Bala shot the songs and provided them to Prakash, so that he would compose the tunes based on the visuals. Prakash further went to Valparai to compose the songs there, to get the feel of that time period and the tea estates.

The music was considered to have a tribal and native feel and Prakash was challenged to create the tunes based on that particular era; he used several percussions and instruments made of skin, to provide a treatment of world music and emphasized on live instrumentation. He further explored on Carnatic ragas such as shubhapantuvarali and shivaranjani raga, to provide ethnicity.

Prakash composed five songs with a variety of genres. He further introduced Yazin Nizar and Pragathi Guruprasad, who performed one song each, while Vandana Srinivasan, who previously recorded "Oru Paadhi Kadhavu" from Thaandavam (2012), composed by Prakash, had sung "Avatha Paiyya" with her co-singer Yazin.

== Release ==
The soundtrack was initially scheduled to be launched at London on 19 September 2012. But the team then decided to host the audio launch at Malaysia and Singapore, due to the difficulties for acquiring visas to London. Those plans were forfeited, and the team eventually conducted the audio launch at Sathyam Cinemas in Chennai on 25 November 2012. With the cast and crew members in attendance, the event was further felicitated by actors Vikram and Suriya and director Balu Mahendra. Gemini Audio acquired the soundtrack's marketing rights.

== Track listing ==
The film's track list was unveiled on 6 November 2012, three weeks prior to the audio launch.

All lyrics are written by Vairamuthu.

| No. | Title | Singer(s) | Length |
|---|---|---|---|
| 1. | "Avatha Paiyya" | Yazin Nizar, Vandana Srinivasan | 5:39 |
| 2. | "Sengaade" | Madhu Balakrishnan | 8:08 |
| 3. | "Or Mirugam" | V. V. Prasanna, Pragathi Guruprasad | 5:51 |
| 4. | "Thannai Thaane" | Gana Bala | 3:12 |
| 5. | "Senneer Thaana" | Gangai Amaran, Priya Himesh | 6:23 |
| Total length: | | | 29:14 |

== Reception ==
S. R. Ashok Kumar of The Hindu noted that Prakash "has done justice to the songs in this period flick". News18 wrote "Paradesi is a dark album filled with sorrow. If you are used to listening pleasant music, you might want to skip everything else but the first track. Some of the other tracks, including Or Mirugam and Seneer Thaana offer some interesting listens. However, the album doesn't have the necessary ingredients to churn out chartbusters. GV Prakash Kumar's music, for a change, serves a higher purpose and comparing it with albums like 'MUK' and 'Aadukalam' gives a stark contrast. You won't be able to get the complete experience until you see the visuals yourself."

S. Saraswathi of Rediff.com wrote "After working with Ilayaraja and Yuvan Shankar Raja in his earlier films, director Bala for the first time teams up with G V Prakash for the music of Paradesi. Though the songs are not overnight chartbusters, the music certainly brings out the essence of the film’s period setting. This is also the first time that Bala has worked with the legendary Vairamuthu, who has effectively expressed the anguish, suffering and helplessness of the characters of the film through his poignant verses, especially in Sengaade and Senneer Thaana. An interesting fact is that the tunes were composed and the lyrics written after Bala picturised the visuals for the scene." Vivek Ramz of In.com wrote "G.V.Prakash's background score adds strength to the film and out of the songs, 'Avatha Paiyya' stands out for the beautiful vocals of Vandana. Vairamuthu's lyrics in 'Sengaade' and 'Seneer Thaana' expresses the suffering of the people with great effect." Sify wrote "GV Prakash Kumar`s songs and BGM serve as the spine of this enterprise, emerging expectedly as one the film's biggest strengths."

== Awards and nominations ==
| Award (Note: Awards, festivals and organisations are in alphabetical order.) | Date of ceremony (Note: Date is linked to the article about the awards held that year, wherever possible.) | Category | Recipient(s) and nominee(s) | Result | Ref. |
|---|---|---|---|---|---|
| BFI London Film Festival | 13–18 October 2013 | Best Music | G. V. Prakash Kumar | Nominated | |
| Filmfare Awards South | 12 July 2014 | Best Music Director – Tamil | G. V. Prakash Kumar | Nominated | |
| Filmfare Awards South | 12 July 2014 | Best Lyricist – Tamil | Vairamuthu for "Sengaade" | Nominated | |
| Filmfare Awards South | 12 July 2014 | Best Female Playback Singer – Tamil | Vandana Srinivasan for "Avatha Paiyaa" | Nominated | |
| Techofes Awards | 13 February 2014 | Best Music Director | G. V. Prakash Kumar | Won | |
| Vijay Awards | 5 July 2014 | Best Female Playback Singer | Vandana Srinivasan for "Avatha Paiyaa" | Nominated | |
