= Stree Shakti =

Indian television series

- Genre: Talk Show With A Social Cause
- Starring: Samiksha Bhatnagar, Divya Dutta, Shruti Ulfat
- Country of origin: India
- Original language: Hindi
- No. of seasons: 2
- No. of episodes: 52

Production
- Producer: Mona Khot (nee Sareen) of Black Swan Entertainment
- Running time: 60 minutes

Original release
- Network: DD National
- Release: January 2015 – August 2015

Stree Shakti ("Woman Power") is an Indian talk show that was originally aired on prime time on DD National in 2015, running for a total of two seasons. It was produced by Mona Khot (nee Mona Sareen), one of the co-founders of the production company Black Swan Entertainment.

The series showcased inspirational women from all walks of life who had emerged triumphant after surmounting extremely difficult circumstances.

== Concept and creation ==
The idea of a TV series focusing on the empowerment of women enthused filmmaker Mona Sareen (Khot) who had been making documentaries and short films for 18 years prior to the show. While travelling around the country on work, she was moved by the many stories she came across of the harsh challenges faced by women. She resolved to bring courageous survivors of rape, domestic violence, acid attacks and other such societal evils before the TV audience to help bring about a difference in the society. Mona said, "Through this show, I attempt to inspire people and create awareness."

== Format ==
Each episode of the show centred around a social theme and a female guest shared her story detailing how she overcame the adversity. The first season of the show dealt with issues like disability, acid attack, domestic violence, gang rape, girls’ education among others. The second season of the show focused on the exemplary courage of women who battled issues related with sex work, mental illness, child marriage, gender inequality etc.

The interactions with the female guests were conducted by the show’s host, a role performed by actresses Samiksha Bhatnagar, Divya Dutta and Shruti Ulfat. The show’s intent was to go beyond just highlighting an issue. The hosts helped the guests narrate firsthand how they navigated tough situations in an effort to inspire viewers who may be in a similar predicament.

Each episode's guest was joined by a celebrity towards the final minutes of the show. Johnny Lever, late Raju Srivastava, Leslie Lewis, Anant Mahadevan, Sonakshi Sinha, Sushant Singh among others were the celebrities who expressed their viewpoint on the show covering various social issues. Actor Piyush Mishra dedicated a poem towards the victim of sexual abuse on the show.

== Celebrity hosts ==
The show was hosted by popular names from the Indian film and television industry. The first 13 episodes were hosted by Samiksha Bhatnagar. Thereafter, actress Divya Dutta took over the reins for the rest of the first season. Dutta marvelled “By the end of each of episode I realised how strong and emancipated these women are.”

The second season had a new anchor in Shruti Ulfat, who said, “Shaken, emotional, inspired, are the three words that instantly come to my mind after shooting with these courageous women in Stree Shakti. I feel so much more evolved after knowing their stories.”

== Women featured on the show ==
Among the women who were featured on the show are:

Arjun Award winner Deepa Malik, who has won a medal at the Paralympic Games.

Hairstylist Sapna Bhavnani who is a gang-rape survivor.

TV host Laxmi Agarwal, who is an acid attack survivor.

Dr. Shivani Gupta who is working for disability rights and creating barrier-free environment in the country,

Padma Shri Kalpana Saroj, a Dalit, school dropout, child bride and a slum dweller wrote her own destiny from rags to riches.

Late Sindhu Tai Sapkal, survived an abusive marriage and became a mother to thousands of orphan children.
