= Dr. Arora =

Hindi Web Series

- Genre: Medical drama
- Created by: Imtiaz Ali
- Screenplay by: Imtiaz Ali; Arif Ali; Sajid Ali; Divya Prakash Dubey; Divya Johry
- Story by: Imtiaz Ali
- Directed by: Sajid Ali; Archit Kumar
- Starring: Kumud Mishra
- Opening theme: Ishaan Chhabra
- Composers: Niladri Kumar; Anand Bhaskar; Ajay Jayanthi
- Country of origin: India
- Original language: Hindi
- No. of seasons: 1
- No. of episodes: 8

Production
- Executive producers: Shrusti Jain; Nidhi Sethia (Note: Credited as Creative Producer)
- Producer: Mohit Chaudhary
- Cinematography: Rajesh Shukla
- Editor: Manish Jaitly
- Running time: 33- 46 minutes
- Production companies: Window Seat Films; Reliance Entertainment

Original release
- Network: SonyLIV
- Release: 22 July 2022

Dr. Arora (also called Dr Arora: Gupt Rog Visheshagya) (Note: Initially titled as Dr Arora: Gupt Rog Visheshagya but later promoted and released as Dr Arora) is a 2023 Indian Hindi-language medical drama television series created by Imtiaz Ali. The series stars Kumud Mishra in the titular role with Raj Arjun, Sandeepa Dhar, Pitobash Tripathy in prominent roles. The series was released on SonyLIV and got mixed reviews.

== Synopsis ==
In the year 1999, in the citie

== Cast ==
- Kumud Mishra as Dr. Vishesh Arora, Sexologist
- Vidya Malvade as Vaishali, ex-wife of Arora
- Raj Arjun as Firangi Baba
- Vivek Mushran as Dinkar Bagla, Newspaper Editor
- Sandeepa Dhar as Mithila "Mithu" Tomar
- Pitobash Tripathy as Singhada, Arora's associate
- Shekhar Suman as Dharamveer Kulshreshtha
- Ajitesh Gupta as SP Tej Pratap Tomar
- Shruti Das as Putul Chandel
- Sam Mohan as Akhil Nair, Baba's Manager
- Shakti Kumar as MLA Goyal
- Mithilesh Chaturvedi as MLA Goyal's Chacha Pathak
- Anushka Luhar as Payal
- Shriidhar Dubey as Manoj Agarwal, reporter
- Aditya Pandey as Young Dr. Arora
- Siya Mahajan as Young Vaishali

== Episodes ==
No. overall	No. in season	Title	Directed by	Written by	Original release date
1	1	"Mardana Taaqat Ka Shartiya Ilaaj"	Sajid Ali; Archit Kumar	Imtiaz Ali; Arif Ali; Sajid Ali; Divya Prakash Dubey; Divya Johry	22 July 2023
1	2	"Chambal Ka Shikari"	Sajid Ali; Archit Kumar	Imtiaz Ali; Arif Ali; Sajid Ali; Divya Prakash Dubey; Divya Johry	22 July 2023
1	3	"Private Meeting"	Sajid Ali; Archit Kumar	Imtiaz Ali; Arif Ali; Sajid Ali; Divya Prakash Dubey; Divya Johry	22 July 2023
1	4	"Intezaar Bekaar Hai"	Sajid Ali; Archit Kumar	Imtiaz Ali; Arif Ali; Sajid Ali; Divya Prakash Dubey; Divya Johry	22 July 2023
1	5	"Sanyam Banaaye Rakhien"	Sajid Ali; Archit Kumar	Imtiaz Ali; Arif Ali; Sajid Ali; Divya Prakash Dubey; Divya Johry	22 July 2023
1	6	"Editorial Changes"	Sajid Ali; Archit Kumar	Imtiaz Ali; Arif Ali; Sajid Ali; Divya Prakash Dubey; Divya Johry	22 July 2023
1	7	"Poocho Matt, Bas Karo"	Sajid Ali; Archit Kumar	Imtiaz Ali; Arif Ali; Sajid Ali; Divya Prakash Dubey; Divya Johry	22 July 2023
1	8	"Haaye Zaalim Zindagi"	Sajid Ali; Archit Kumar	Imtiaz Ali; Arif Ali; Sajid Ali; Divya Prakash Dubey; Divya Johry	22 July 2023
