= Anth The End =

2022 Indian film

- Directed by: K. S. Malhotra
- Written by: K. S. Malhotra; Hardev Singh
- Produced by: K. S. Malhotra
- Starring: Divya Dutta; Mukul Dev; Dev Sharma; Samikssha Batnagar
- Cinematography: Bharani K. Dharan; Harshad Jadhav
- Edited by: Samir Shaikh
- Music by: Vinay Vinayak; Sandeep Saxena
- Release date: 11 November 2022
- Running time: 106 minutes
- Country: India
- Language: Hindi

Anth The End is a 2022 Indian Hindi-language drama film written, directed and produced by K. S. Malhotra and starring Divya Dutta, Mukul Dev, Dev Sharma and Samikssha Batnagar.

== Cast ==
- Divya Dutta as Divya
- Mukul Dev as Ranjeet
- Dev Sharma as Sumeet
- Samikssha Batnagar as Simran
- Deepraj Rana
- Arun Bakshi
- Aman Dhaliwal

== Soundtrack ==
The film's background score and songs were composed by Umesh Rao Rane, with vocals performed by Sandeep Saxena, Vinay Vinayak, Master Salim, and Neeraj Shridhar.

== Reception ==
Carla Ray of Culture Mix criticized the film for its "shoddy" execution and unconvincing disguise elements, with performances described as substandard.
