= Isi Life Mein...! =

- Directed by: Vidhi Kasliwal
- Screenplay by: Sulekha Bajpai
- Story by: Vidhi Kasliwal
- Produced by: Kamal Kumar Barjatya; Rajkumar Barjatya; Ajit Kumar Barjatya
- Starring: Akshay Oberoi; Sandeepa Dhar
- Music by: Meet Bros Anjjan Ankit
- Distributed by: Rajshri Productions
- Release date: 24 December 2010
- Running time: 139 minutes
- Country: India
- Language: Hindi

Isi Life Mein...! (transl. In This Life) is a 2010 Indian Hindi-language film starring Akshay Oberoi alongside Sandeepa Dhar in both their debut films. It was directed by Vidhi Kasliwal and released on 24 December 2010. The film earned the Filmfare Award for Best Female Debut nomination for Sandeepa Dhar.

== Plot ==
The story begins in Ajmer, in the state of Rajasthan, where Rajnandini Khandelwal passes her 12th class examination and is the state-topper, winning three scholarships. Everyone is happy, but in keeping with her father's conservative tastes, she is expected to marry a man of her parents' choosing. However, she wants to study further and wishes for her mother to support her, and so her mother tricks the father to send her to Mumbai to a relative's house, ostensibly to learn the culinary arts, as preparation for her marriage. However, secretly, the mother enrolled her in a college, and instead of staying with her aunt, as had been agreed with the father, arrangements have been made by the mother and her sister (aunt) to put her up in a hostel.

At the college, the principal instructs Rajnandini that she must join one of the various extracurricular societies, and so she volunteers for the college's Dramatics Society (DS), headed by Vivaan. When she introduces herself as Rajnandini Khandelwal, the others mock her name as being "long," and Vivaan abbreviates her name to "RJ."

The DS under Vivaan decides to participate in a National Theatre Festival, and Vivaan chooses William Shakespeare's The Taming of the Shrew; however, when a member of the DS objects that the play is "MCPish," Vivaan declares that he will modify it to remove the misogyny and that the play would be known as The Taming of the Shrew - Reborn.

Vivaan and RJ become good friends, and love seems to be in the air. RJ helps Vivaan to overcome his hostility towards his demanding father and come to a compromise about his (Vivaan's) future career possibilities.

But on her birthday, RJ and her friends-including Vivaan go to her aunt's house, where, surprisingly, her dad opens the door. He is enraged with her for being out partying with her friends and her modern attire and demeanour. He takes her back to Ajmer, where her marriage is fixed with the son of an old business associate, Nareshchandra.

A heart-broken Vivaan decides to go to Ajmer with the entire DS gang, reaching RJ's home during the preparations for her engagement ceremony.

On being confronted for the real reason of his presence by RJ's hostile father, Vivaan confesses that his play cannot work without RJ and that he wants her to resume her leading part, even if only for the final play. RJ's father angrily rejects the request and denounces Vivaan and his friends as having no regard for or respect for traditions.

However, as the day goes by, RJ's father is under increasing stress due to Nareshchandra's escalating dowry demands and comes to appreciate Vivaan and his friends for their help in meeting these expectations, coming to the realisation that "one's own exploit and abuse while strangers aid and succor," so much so that, as RJ and the groom are about to wed, her father forbids her, breaks off the wedding with Nareshchandra's son, and decides to allow RJ to pursue her passion and fulfill her dreams.

The play wins the 1st prize, and everyone in RJ's and Vivaan's families is extremely happy; Vivaan and RJ get engaged, and RJ is sent to New York to hone her natural passion for choreography, after which it is planned that they will get married. The story ends with the last scene, where everyone is at the airport to drop RJ.

== Cast ==
- Akshay Oberoi as Vivaan
- Sandeepa Dhar as Rajnandini Khandelwal (RJ)
- Mohnish Behl as Ravimohan Khandelwal, RJ’s father
- Prachi Shah as Pratibha Khandelwal, RJ’s mother
- Shagufta Ali as Maa'sa (Mrs. Khandelwal)
- Aditya Raj Kapoor as Prashant, Vivaan’s father
- Mansee Deshmukh as Riya
- Ayush Mehra as Sunil
- Vibha Anand as Nupur
- Moin Khan as TinTin
- Samaira Rao as Valerie
- Akash Bathija as Sumo
- Daisy Irani as herself
- Dalip Tahil as himself
- Neha Kakkar as Sam
- Gajendra Chauhan as Nareshchand (Groom's father)
- Salman Khan (special appearance)

== Soundtrack ==
The film's soundtrack is composed by Meet Bros Anjjan, with lyrics penned by Manoj Muntashir.

Track listing
No.	Title	Singer(s)	Length
1.	"Isi Umar Mein"	Shreya Ghoshal, Mohit Chauhan, Dominique Cerejo	4:45
2.	"Ramji 24x7"	Shreya Ghoshal, Debojit Saha, Kavita Seth	4:16
3.	"Living Out Loud"	Shreya Ghoshal, Meet Bros, Suzanne D'Mello	5:07
4.	"Tere Pyar Mein"	Kunal Ganjawala, Shreya Ghoshal	6:55
5.	"Banni Avela Tharo Banna"	Kavita Seth	3:16
6.	"Tum Darshan Hum Naina"	Udit Narayan	3:08
7.	"Apna Kaun Paraya Kaun"	Udit Narayan	2:33
8.	"Isi Umar Mein" (Solo Version)	Mohit Chauhan	4:04
9.	"Ramji 24x7" (Remix Version)	Meet Bros Anjjan	3:17
10.	"Taming of the Shrew Reborn" (Instrumental Version)	Meet Bros Anjjan	3:20
Total length:			40:33
