= Samikssha Batnagar =

Indian actress (born 1988)

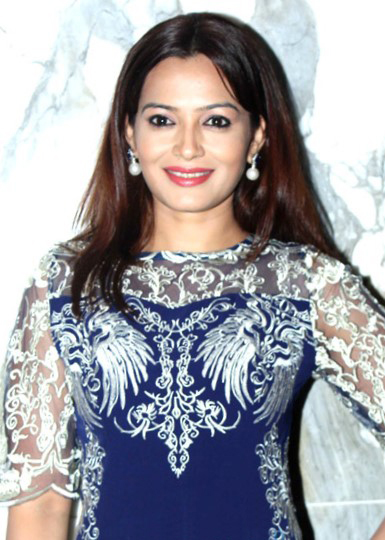
- Batnagar at the screening of Poster Boys
- Born: Samiksha Bhatnagar; 12 January 1988 (age 38); Dehradun, Uttarakhand, India
- Citizenship: India
- Occupation: Actress
- Years active: 2011–present

Samikssha Batnagar (born 12 January 1988) is an Indian actress who was seen in various Hindi serials on Star Plus and Zee TV until 2014 in both supporting as well as lead roles. She did a cameo in Madhur Bhandarkar's Calendar Girls, released in the year 2015, marking her Bollywood debut and in 2017 she acted in the Shreyas Talpade-directed movie Poster Boys, opposite Bobby Deol, which is her first lead role opposite a popular actor.

== Career ==
=== Career in television ===
Her biggest break was when she got to play the lead role in Ek Veer Ki Ardaas...Veera (Star Plus). Followed by this, she appeared in Uttaran (Star Plus), Devon Ke Dev...Mahadev (Life OK), Baal Veer (SAB TV), Kum Kum Bhagya (Zee TV) and a few other well-known serials.

=== Movie debut ===
She cameoed in Madhur Bhandarkar's Calendar Girls in 2015. Followed by this, Batnagar finished shooting for the Shreyas Talpade directed Poster Boys, which features Sunny Deol and Bobby Deol as well as Shreyas Talpade himself in the lead role. In the movie, she played the character of Surajmukhi opposite Bobby Deol. The movie released on 8 September 2017. In the span of 2021 and 2022, Batnagar appeared in Black Rose, Dhoop Chhaon and Anth The End. She was praised for her brilliant performance in Anth The End, and was said to have one of the best performances in Dhoop Chhaon.

== Filmography ==
=== Films ===
Year	Movie	Character
2015	Calendar Girls	Nandita's sister
2017	Poster Boys	Surajmukhi Sharma
2018	Hamne Gandhi Ko Maar Diya	Sudha Singh
2022	Dhoop Chhaon	Meghna
2022	Anth The End	Simran
TBA	Black Rose	ACP Tara

=== Television ===
Year	Serial	Role
2012–2013	Baalveer	Vijdhar Pari
2012–2013	Ek Veer Ki Ardaas...Veera	Gurpreet Kartar Singh
2013–14	Devon Ke Dev...Mahadev	Maharani Mandodari
2014	Savdhaan India	
2014	Kumkum Bhagya	Mitali Raj Mehra
2014	Uttaran	Zubeida Ahmed
2014–15	Yam Hain Hum	
2014–15	Peterson Hill	
2014–15	Stree Shakti	
	Neeli Chatri Waale	
2015–16	Jaane Kya Hoga Rama Re	
2016	Gupp Chupp	Bulbul Sonu Sethi
2021–22	Tera Chhalaava	
2022	Dharavi Bank	
2026	Anupamaa	Shruti Ahuja

=== Theatre ===
Year	Play	Role
2014–15	Rashomon Blues	Journalist
2022–23	Jai Shri Ram Ramayan	Goddess Sita
