= Sandeepa Dhar =

Indian actress (born 1989)

- Dhar in 2023
- Born: Srinagar, Jammu and Kashmir, India
- Education: St. Xavier's College
- Occupations: Model; actress
- Years active: 2010–present

Sandeepa Dhar is an Indian actress who appears in Hindi films. She made her acting debut in 2010 with Isi Life Mein. For her performance in the film, she was nominated for Filmfare Award for Best Female Debut, Star Screen Award for Most Promising Newcomer and Stardust Award for Superstar of Tomorrow. Dhar featured in a cameo in Dabangg 2 alongside Salman Khan. Dhar also received critical acclaim for her performance in Sajid Nadiadwala's Heropanti.

== Early life and education ==
Dhar was born in Srinagar, Jammu and Kashmir, India in a Kashmiri Pandit family. She is professionally trained dancer. Have won several awards for her dancing, she trained in Bharatanatyam for 8 years from Vani Ganpathy. She also trained in Jazz and Contemporary for 4 years from Shiamak Davar and Terence Lewis.

Dhar was educated at St. Michael's Convent School, ITI Mankapur, and at National Public School, Indiranagar. She then graduated from St. Xavier's College, Mumbai.

== Career ==
Dhar at an event in 2018

Dhar made her acting debut in 2010 with Rajshri Production's Isi Life Mein opposite Akshay Oberoi. Her performance earned her nominations at Screen, Filmfare and Stardust Awards. Taran Adarsh praised her performance in the film and stated, "Sandeepa is another talent that catches your attention. Her expressions are just perfect." The film failed commercially.

Dhar next prominent role came with the 2014 film Heropanti, she played a woman who runs away from family for her love. The film emerged a commercial success at the box office. In the 2016 film 7 Hours to Go, she played a police officer. Though the film was a box office failure, Rohit Bhatnagar of Deccan Chronicle noted, "Despite few loopholes in her character, Dhar impresses with her tough cop role."

Dhar expanded to streaming series in 2019 with the first season of Abhay, playing a police inspector opposite Kunal Khemu. In 2022, she appeared in two web series that received critical acclaim and high viewership: Mai, and Dr Arora: Gupt Rog Visheshagya.

Dhar had two releases in 2026. She first appeared as a woman conscious of her looks in Do Deewane Seher Mein. A critic of Bollywood Hungama opined: "Dhar leaves a mark in a small role. Her breakdown scene in the second half is memorable." She then played an air hostess in the series Chumbak, opposite Sumeet Raghavan. The series and her performance received positive response from critics and audience alike. Anisha Rao of India Today felt Dhar "settles comfortably" in the ensemble cast.

== Filmography ==
Key
| † | Denotes films that have not yet been released |

=== Films ===
| Year | Title | Role | Notes | Ref. |
|---|---|---|---|---|
| 2010 | Isi Life Mein...! | Rajnandini "RJ" Khandelwal | | |
| 2012 | Dabangg 2 | Anjali Prasad | Cameo appearance | |
| 2014 | Heropanti | Renuka "Renu" Chaudhary | | |
| 2015 | Gollu Aur Pappu | Pia Dhillon | | |
| 2016 | Global Baba | Bhavana Sharma | | |
| 2016 | 7 Hours to Go | ACP Nandini Shukla | | |
| 2017 | Baaraat Company | Mehek | | |
| 2019 | Cartel | Shweta | | |
| 2021 | Kaagaz | Herself | Special appearance in song Laalam Lal | |
| 2026 | Do Deewane Seher Mein | Naina Shrivastava | | |
| TBA | Firrkie † | Shanaya | Completed | |

=== Web series ===
| Year | Title | Role | Notes | Ref. |
|---|---|---|---|---|
| 2019 | Abhay | Komal | Season 1 | |
| 2019 | Flip | Firdaus | Episode: "Massage" | |
| 2020 | Mum Bhai | Vaishnavi | | |
| 2021 | Bisaat- Khel Shatranj Ka | Dr. Kiana Verma | | |
| 2021 | Chattis Aur Maina | Rani Angle "Maina" | | |
| 2022 | Mai | Inaya Siddiqui | | |
| 2022 | Dr Arora: Gupt Rog Visheshagya | Mithila "Mithu" Tomar | Season 1 | |
| 2025 | Pyar Ka Professor | Mallika Choudhary | | |
| 2026 | Chumbak | Kiran Kejriwal | | |

=== Music videos ===
| Year | Title | Singer | Ref. |
|---|---|---|---|
| 2022 | "Ik Mili Mainu Apsraa" | B Praak & Asees Kaur | |
| 2022 | "Ab Kise Barbaad Karoge" | Altamash Faridi | |
| 2025 | "Nafrat" | Darshan Raval | |

== Awards and nominations ==
| Year | Award | Category | Work | Result | Ref. |
|---|---|---|---|---|---|
| 2011 | Filmfare Awards | Best Female Debut | Isi Life Mein...! | Nominated | |
| 2011 | Screen Awards | Most Promising Newcomer – Female | Isi Life Mein...! | Nominated | |
| 2011 | Stardust Awards | Superstar of Tomorrow – Female | Isi Life Mein...! | Nominated | |

== See also ==
- List of Indian film actresses
