= Chumbak (TV series) =

2026 Indian TV series

- Showrunner: Jamnadas Majethia
- Written by: Aatish Kapadia
- Directed by: Aatish Kapadia
- Starring: Neena Gupta; Sandeepa Dhar; Deven Bhojani; Manasi Parekh; Sumeet Vyas
- Country of origin: India
- Original language: Hindi
- No. of seasons: 1
- No. of episodes: 16

Production
- Producer: Jamnadas Majethia
- Cinematography: Sanket Shah
- Camera setup: Multi-camera
- Running time: 24 minutes
- Production company: Hats Off Productions

Original release
- Network: Netflix
- Release: 10 September 2026 – present

Chumbak is a 2026 Hindi-language comedy drama television series written and directed by Aatish Kapadia and produced by Jamnadas Majethia for Netflix. The series stars Neena Gupta, Sandeepa Dhar, Manasi Parekh, Helly Shah, Amyra Dastur, Sumeet Vyas, Anant Joshi, Arjun Bijlani, Deven Bhojani, Delnaaz Irani, Sumeet Raghavan, and Atul Kumar.

Chumbak premiered on 10 September 2026 on Netflix. Season 1 was released in two parts, with Part 2 premiered on 1 October 2026 on Netflix.

== Cast ==
- Neena Gupta as Rajni Desai (formerly Merchant), Kuku's ex-wife
- Deven Bhojani as Kuku Merchant, Rajni's ex-husband
- Sumeet Vyas as Aditya Khanna, Priyanka's husband
- Manasi Parekh as Priyanka Khanna, Aditya's wife
- Arjun Bijlani as Dr. Mikhael "Mickey" Oberoi, Twinkle's husband and Nari's son-in-law
- Helly Shah as Twinkle Oberoi (née Ravjiani), Mickey's wife and Nari's daughter
- Sumeet Raghavan as Dharmendra Kejriwal, Kiran's husband
- Sandeepa Dhar as Kiran Kejriwal, Dharmendra's wife
- Anant Joshi as Freddy Taraporewala, Gulshan's son and Hutoxi's husband
- Amyra Dastur as Hutoxi Taraporewala (née Bharucha), Freddy's wife and Gulshan's daughter-in-law
- Delnaaz Irani as Gulshan Taraporewala, Freddy's mother
- Ravee Gupta as Munmun
- Vidhaan Sharma as Ruhaan Khanna, Adi and Priyanka's older son
- Vidvaan Sharma as Vedant Khanna, Adi and Priyanka's younger son
- Atul Kumar as Nari Ravjiani, Twinkle's father
- Bhoomi Ramola as Piya Kejriwal, Dharmendra and Kiran's daughter
- Rohit Roy as Ronit Roy Chaudhary
- Shruti Bapna as Sarika Sarikaskar Sarkaskar
- Bhalchandra Kadam as Vishnusharman

== Production ==
=== Development ===
Sumeet Raghavan announced the series with a teaser in February 2026.

=== Casting ===
Helly Shah re-united with Anant Joshi after Gullak 5 in this series.

=== Filming ===
Filming of the series wrapped in March 2026.

== Marketing ==
An official trailer was released on 26 August, 2026.

== Release ==
The series was initially set for release on 28 August 2026 on Netflix, but on 26 August 2026 Netflix announced a new release date on 10 September 2026.

== Critical reception ==
Deepa Gahlot for Rediff.com stated that the series is "an old style sitcom, which has its own charms." Anisha Rao of India Today opined "this characters may be irritating, intrusive and occasionally ridiculous, but the show never seems to dislike them."

Tanisha Bhattacharya for NDTV stated "But to put it in a nutshell, Chumbak makes you laugh effortlessly." Mudit Bhatnagar for Times Now opined "There is a clear old-school flavour to the writing." Shilajit Mitra for The Hollywood Reporter India felt that the series "embraces silliness" and wrote "After a few episodes, the bottom-feeding energy is infectious. The assault of wordplay is relentless."

Troy Ribeiro of The Free Press Journal stated "There are moments of amusement, but little that qualifies as exceptional."
