= Naan Rajavaga Pogiren =

2013 Indian film by Prithvi Rajkumar

- Film poster
- Directed by: Prithvi Rajkumar
- Written by: Prithvi Rajkumar; Vetrimaaran (dialogues)
- Produced by: K. Dhanasekar
- Starring: Nakul; Chandini Tamilarasan; Avani Modi
- Cinematography: Velraj
- Edited by: Prakash Mappu
- Music by: G. V. Prakash Kumar
- Production company: Udhayam VLS Cine Media
- Release date: 26 April 2013
- Country: India
- Language: Tamil

Naan Rajavaga Pogiren (transl. I am going to become a king) is a 2013 Indian Tamil-language masala film written and directed by Prithvi Rajkumar. The film stars Nakul, Chandini Tamilarasan, and newcomer Avani Modi.

The film initially focuses on a peculiar young man in Himachal Pradesh, who is suffering from a sleep disorder and hangs out with a peer group that is much younger than his actual age. After learning about the existence of his lookalike, the man leaves his mountainous village and goes searching for him. He learns about his lookalike's life by questioning people who were once close to the other man.

== Plot ==
Jeeva is a Tamil-speaking young man living with his mother in some obscure Himachal Pradesh village. He is naive and plays with kids half his age. Jeeva has a sleep disorder and dozes off in the middle of important things, viz. the climax of Dilwale Dulhaniya Le Jayenge. Jeeva would be a hard eight a book of weirdness.

One day, a military serviceman mistakes him for a classmate named Raja from Chennai who looks just like him. After showing a few videos of Raja, he convinces Jeeva to leave his life in Himachal to go seek his lookalike. Most of the movie is basically Jeeva getting to know about Raja by talking to someone close to the latter. These people talked about Raja as they knew him. This results in a series of flashbacks which guide Jeeva and us on his search for Raja. We meet Raja's closest friend who has feelings for him. Through her, we go into another flashback and meet Valli who Raja had feelings for.

== Cast ==
- Nakul in a dual role as Raja and Jeeva
- Chandini as Valli
- Avani Modi as Reema
- Nishanth as Wahab
- A. Venkatesh as Isakkimuthu Annachi
- Gaurav Narayanan as Police Ravi
- Manivannan as Kamaraj
- Bobby Simha as Shankar Subramaniam
- Kasthuri as Professor Bharathi
- Suresh as Raja's father
- Seetha as Raja's mother
- Vanitha Vijayakumar as Dr. Diana
- Aarthi as Karate Durga
- Delhi Ganesh as Kamaraj's assistant
- G. V. Kumar as Reema's father
- Boys Rajan as Valli's father
- Chetan as Diana's husband
- Vasu Vikram as Raja's uncle
- Mayilsamy as Drunkard
- Crane Manohar as Drunkard
- Thyagu as Professor
- Muthuraman as Commissioner
- Munnar Ramesh as Inspector
- Supergood Subramani as Inspector

Special appearances

- Zareen Khan as Item number Malgova
- Vetrimaaran
- G. V. Prakash Kumar
- Velraj
- Raaghav as a boxer

== Production ==
The shoot of the film began on 12 December 2011 at Sri Patalathri Narasimha Perumal Temple, Singaperumal Koil .

== Soundtrack ==
Naan Rajavaga Pogiren

Soundtrack album by G. V. Prakash Kumar
- Released: 14 December 2012
- Genre: Feature film soundtrack
- Language: Tamil
- Label: Gemini Audio
- Producer: G. V. Prakash Kumar

G. V. Prakash Kumar chronology
Paradesi (2012)	Naan Rajavaga Pogiren (2012)	Ongole Githa (2013)

The soundtrack, composed by G. V. Prakash Kumar, was released on 14 December 2012 at Sathyam Cinemas by Ameer Sultan and Dhanush. Apart from the cast and crew, Vasanthabalan, Gaurav, Sivakarthikeyan, Jithan Ramesh, Vanitha Vijayakumar, Sriman, Dhananjayan were among those present. Musicperk.com rated the album 5.5/10 quoting "GV misses the bus".

No.	Title	Lyrics	Performer(s)	Length
1.	"College Paadam"	Annamalai	Rahul Nambiar, Megha, Santhosh
2.	"Yaarivano"	Madhan Karky	G. V. Prakash Kumar, Saindhavi
3.	"Kalaaipom"	Prithvi Rajkumar	Silambarasan, Zlatan, Maya, Satish
4.	"Raja Raja"	Madhan Karky	Shalmali Kholgade
5.	"Malgova"	Annamalai	Sonu Kakkar

== Release ==
The satellite rights of the film were sold to Raj TV.

== Critical reception ==
Baradwaj Rangan from The Hindu wrote, "Not-bad fare for masala movie fans". Behindwoods wrote:"Naan Rajavaga Pogiren is an ambitious effort, by a promising new comer, but with a less gripping screenplay". Sify stated On the whole, it is well-worn, formulaic fare that might appeal to viewers who find comfort in the familiar. If you have time go for it, as it is not entirely unwatchable.
