= Mukul Dev =

Indian actor (1970–2025)

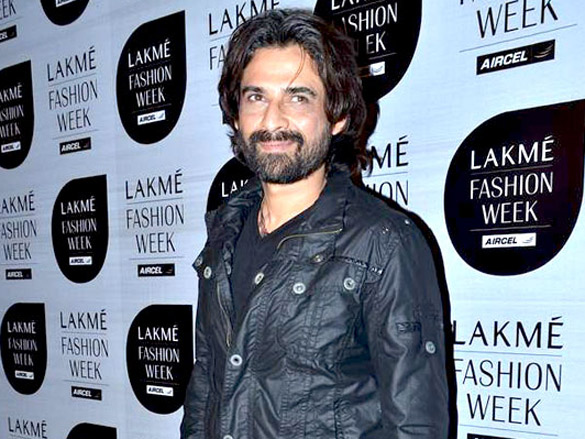
- Dev at a show, c. 2012
- Born: Mukul Dev Kaushal; 17 September 1970; New Delhi, India
- Died: 23 May 2025 (aged 54); New Delhi, India
- Occupation: Actor
- Years active: 1996–2025
- Known for: Dastak
- Children: 1
- Relatives: Rahul Dev (brother)

Mukul Dev Kaushal (/ˈmʊkʊl dɛv ˈkaʊʃəl/; 17 September 1970 – 23 May 2025) was an Indian television and film actor. He was renowned for his roles in Hindi and Punjabi films, TV series, and music albums, and also appeared in Bengali, Malayalam, Kannada, and Telugu films.

== Early life ==
Mukul Dev was born in New Delhi into a Punjabi family with roots in a village near Jalandhar and grew up in Delhi. He was the younger brother of actor and model Rahul Dev. They also have a sister. He studied at St. Columba's School, Delhi.

Mukul stated that he was exposed to Afghan culture through his father, who could speak Pashto and Persian. His father, Hari Dev, a former Assistant Commissioner of Police, died on 17 April 2019, at the age of 91.

In class 8, he won his first pay cheque when he impersonated Michael Jackson for a dance show organized by Doordarshan. He was a trained pilot from the Indira Gandhi Rashtriya Uran Akademi.

== Career ==
=== Television ===
Mukul Dev made his acting debut on TV as Piyush Raheja in the first of its kind Indian television series called A Mouthful of Sky which aired in 1995 on DD National. It was the first serial in English to be produced in India. He also later acted in the serial Mumkin playing the role of Vijay Pandey in 1996. He also acted in Doordarshan's Ek Se Badkar Ek, a comedy Bollywood countdown show.

He was also the host of Fear Factor India Season 1. He acted in several television serials in the 2000s such as Kahin Diyaa Jale Kahin Jiyaa (2001), Kahaani Ghar Ghar Kii (2003) and Pyar Zindagi Hai (2003). He participated in the dance competition show Kabhi Kabhii Pyaar Kabhi Kabhii Yaar in 2008.

In 2018, he appeared in 65 episodes of the television series 21 Sarfarosh - Saragarhi 1897.

=== Films ===
Dev was spotted by Amitabh Bachchan's company ABCL and got a role for a movie titled Naam Kya Hai but it got shelved. He made his film debut in 1996 with Dastak as ACP Rohit Malhotra in the same movie which also introduced Miss Universe 1994 Sushmita Sen. He appeared in several films such as Qila (1998), Wajood (1998), Mere Do Anmol Ratan (1998), Kohram (1999) and Mujhe Meri Biwi Se Bachaao (2001). He also appeared in many regional films in Punjabi, Bengali and Telugu languages.

In recent years he played supporting roles in the Hindi films Yamla Pagla Deewana (2011), Son of Sardaar (2012), R... Rajkumar (2013) and Jai Ho (2014).

Shortly before his death, he shot for Son of Sardaar 2 and Udta Teer, the latter of which will mark his final film appearance.

== Death ==
In May 2025, Dev was hospitalised for an illness. His health worsened and despite being moved to the intensive care unit, he died in New Delhi on 23 May, at the age of 54.

== Filmography ==
=== Film ===
List of Mukul Dev film credits
Year	Title	Role	Language	Notes
1996	Dastak	ACP Rohit Malhotra	Hindi	
1998	Wajood	Inspector Nihal Joshi	Hindi	
1998	Iski Topi Uske Sarr	Raj	Hindi	
1998	Himmatwala	Suraj	Hindi	
1998	Qila	Amar A. Singh	Hindi	
1998	Mere Do Anmol Ratan	Surinder (Suren)	Hindi	
1998	Sar Aakhon Par	Himself	Hindi	
1999	Kohram	Monty	Hindi	
2001	Ittefaq	Vikram Singh	Hindi	
2001	Mujhe Meri Biwi Se Bachaao	Monty	Hindi	
2001	Guru Mahaaguru	Ajay	Hindi	
2003	Hawayein		Punjabi	
2005	Ek Khiladi Ek Haseena	Bhatia	Hindi	
2006	Chor Mandli	Hero	Hindi	
2007	Just Married	Shoib Mirza	Hindi	
2008	De Taali	Sunil	Hindi	
2008	Krishna	Jakka	Telugu	
2009	Rajani	Jakka	Kannada	
2009	Ek Niranjan	Kailash	Telugu	
2009	Sidham	Bilal	Telugu	
2010	Kedi	Human Bomb	Telugu	
2010	Adhurs	Rasool	Telugu	
2011	Bejawada	Vijay Krishna	Telugu	
2011	Abhisandhi		Bengali	
2011	Money Money, More Money	Abbas	Telugu	
2011	Yamla Pagla Deewana	Gurmeet 'Billa' Singh Brar	Hindi	
2012	Burrraahh	Gurpartap Singh Nazi	Punjabi	
2012	Son of Sardaar	Tony Sandhu	Hindi	
2012	Awara	Tony Bharadwaj	Bengali	
2012	Chaar Din Ki Chandni	Udaybhan	Hindi	
2012	Nippu	Shankar Khakha	Telugu	
2013	R... Rajkumar	Qamar Ali	Hindi	
2013	Bhai	Anthony	Telugu	
2013	Heer and Hero	Inspector Zaildar	Punjabi	
2013	War Chhod Na Yaar	Afghani Ghuspetia	Hindi	
2014	Creature 3D	Professor Sadana	Hindi	
2014	Bachchan	Underworld King Master	Bengali	
2014	Baaz	Darbara	Punjabi	
2014	Jal		Hindi	
2014	Jai Ho	Shreekanth Paatil	Hindi	
2015	Meeruthiya Gangsters	R.K. Singh	Hindi	
2015	Bhaag Johny	ACP Pathan	Hindi	
2015	Shareek	Dara Brar	Punjabi	
2015	Ishq Vich: You Never Know	Unknown	Punjabi	
2015	Hero 'Naam Yaad Rakhi'	Jeet	Punjabi	
2016	Saka - The Martyrs of Nankana Sahib	Sardar Kartar Singh Jhabbar	Punjabi	
2016	Nagarahavu	Cameo	Kannada	
2016	Zorawar	Samarjeet Singh	Punjabi	
2016	Jora 10 Numbaria	Shera	Punjabi	
2018	Pagalpanti	Inspector Ram Sharma	Gujarati	
2018	Teri Bhabhi Hai Pagle	Arru Bhai	Hindi	
2018	My Story	Sunil	Malayalam	
2018	Sultan: The Saviour	Dinesh Roy / Sarkaar	Bengali	
2018	Nirdosh	Rana	Hindi	
2018	Omerta	–	Hindi	Screenwriter
2019	Daaka	Inspector Kuldeep Singh	Punjabi	
2019	Saak	Karam Singh's friend	Punjabi	
2019	Barefoot Warriors	Daman Singh	English	
2019	Munda Faridkotia	Darvesh	Punjabi	
2019	Sarabha: Cry for Freedom	Harnam Singh Tundilat	Punjabi	Also released in English and Hindi
2019	3rd Eye	Malik	Hindi	
2022	Anth The End		Hindi	
2025	Son of Sardaar 2	Tony Sandhu	Hindi	Posthumous release
2026	Udta Teer	Azhar Maqsood	Hindi	Posthumous release

=== Television ===
List of Mukul Dev television credits
Year	Serial	Role	Notes	Ref.
1995	A Mouthful of Sky	Piyush		
1996	Mumkin	Vijay Pandey		
2000–2003	Gharwali Uparwali	Ravi		
2002	Hare Kanch Ki Chudian	Amar	Telefilm	
2002	Ek Tukdaa Chaand Ka	Akash Kapoor		
2002	Kahin Diyaa Jale Kahin Jiyaa	Rohit Rajvansh		
2003	Kutumb	Abhijat Desai		
2003–2004	Gharwali Uparwali Aur Sunny	Ravi		
2004	Kya Hadsaa Kya Haqeeqat - Kab Kaisey Kahan	Himanshu	One episode	
2004	Bhabhi	Tilak Chopra		
2004–2006	K. Street Pali Hill	Arindam Keshav		
2005	Kasshish	Aman		
2006	Fear Factor India	Host		
2006	Ssshhhh...Phir Koi Hai - Waaris	Kunwar Virendra Pratap Singh	One episode	
2008	Kumkum – Ek Pyara Sa Bandhan	Pulkit		
2008	Arslaan	Zakfaar		
2008	Kabhi Kabhii Pyaar Kabhi Kabhii Yaar	Himself	Winner	
2009	Ssshhhh...Phir Koi Hai - Thakur Ki Dulhan	Thakur Virendra Pratap Singh		
2018	21 Sarfarosh - Saragarhi 1897	Gul Badshah		

=== Web series ===
List of Mukul Dev web series credits
Year	Title	Role	Notes
2019	Maaya	Dr. Akash Arora	
2020	State Of Siege: 26/11	Zakiur Rehman Lakhvi	

== Dubbing roles ==
=== Live action films ===
List of Mukul Dev film live action dubbing credits
Title	Actor(s)	Character(s)	Dubbed Language	Original Language	Original year release	Dubbed year release	Notes
Black Panther	Andy Serkis	Ulysses Klaue	Hindi	English	2018	2018	Pawan Shukla dubbed this character in Avengers: Age of Ultron
Captain Marvel	Jude Law	Yon-Rogg	Hindi	English	2019	2019	

== Awards and nominations ==
Year	Awards	Category	Work	Result	Refs
2008	Indian Television Academy Awards	Best Actor in a Negative Role	Kumkum – Ek Pyara Sa Bandhan	Won	
2019	Indian Telly Awards	Best Actor in a Negative Role (Jury)	21 Sarfarosh – Saragarhi 1897	Won	
