= Avani Modi =

Indian actress

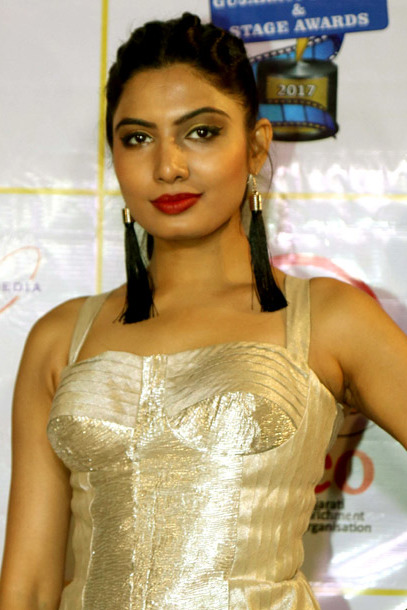
- Modi at the 17th Transmedia Gujarati Screen & Stage Awards in 2018
- Born: Gandhinagar, Gujarat, India
- Occupations: Actress, Model
- Years active: 2013–present

Avani Modi is an Indian model and actress. She made her Bollywood debut in Madhur Bhandarkar's drama film Calendar Girls.

== Career ==
Modi's initial exposure was as an anchor on the local television channel ETV. She also began modelling and appearing in commercials for Airtel and other brands, appeared in TV serials on Sony TV and Zee TV, and featured in a video by Altaf Raja. Her Tamil movie debut was in Naan Rajavaga Pogiren, opposite Nakul. As well as Indian movies, she has also appeared in an international short movie, Gulab, which won the Best Film Award at the Canada International Film Festival.

She played role of Nazneen Malik in Madhur Bhandarkar's 2015 film Calendar Girls, about five girls from different regions of India who are selected to pose for the country's most prestigious annual calendar.

More than eight years after she played a leading role in Carry On Kesar (2017), she made her D-Town comeback with Fari Ek Vaar (2025).

== Filmography ==
=== Films ===
| Year | Title | Role | Ref. |
|---|---|---|---|
| 2015 | Calendar Girls | | |
| 2017 | Carry On Kesar | | |
