= Supriya Pathak =

Indian actress (born 1961)

Supriya Pathak Kapur
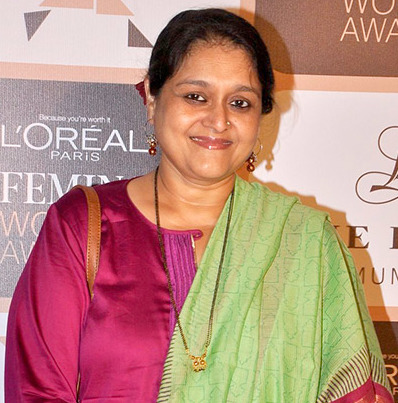
- Pathak in 2015
- Born: 7 January 1961 (age 65); Mumbai, Maharashtra, India
- Education: University of Mumbai
- Occupation: Actress
- Years active: 1981–present
- Spouse: Pankaj Kapur (m. 1988)
- Children: 2
- Mother: Dina Pathak
- Relatives: Kapoor-Pathak family

Supriya Pathak Kapur (born 7 January 1961) is an Indian actress who works in Gujarati and Hindi films and television. She garnered widespread recognition and acclaim with her portrayal of Hansa Parekh in the Khichdi franchise. She has received several awards, including a Filmfare OTT Award and three Filmfare Awards. She also featured in the hit TV serial Idhar Udhar in the 1980s.

Younger daughter of actress Dina Pathak, she married her second husband, actor Pankaj Kapur in 1988, with whom she has a daughter and a son. Her sister is actress Ratna Pathak Shah, who is married to actor Naseeruddin Shah. Actor Shahid Kapoor is her stepson.

== Early life ==
Supriya was born on 7 January 1961 to Kathiyawadi Gujarati theater artiste and veteran actor, Dina Pathak and a Punjabi father, Baldev Pathak, dressmaker to the stars Rajesh Khanna and Dilip Kumar. She has one elder sister, Ratna Pathak, also a theater and film actor. She grew up in Parsi Colony in Dadar, Mumbai, and attended the J. B. Vachha High School. She has a bachelor's degree in Fine art, specialising in Bharatanatyam, from the Nalanda Dance Research Centre, University of Mumbai.

== Career ==
Pathak's first foray into acting was under her mother's direction with the revival of the play Maina Gurjari, which Dina Pathak had acted in previously. This was followed by a play with Dinesh Thakur titled Biwiyon Ka Madersa (based on a play by French playwright Molière), which was staged at the Prithvi Theatre. It was here that Jennifer Kendall (the late wife of Shashi Kapoor) spotted her and recommended her to Shyam Benegal for their home production Kalyug (1981), an adaptation of the epic Mahabharata. Her portrayal of Subhadra won her the Filmfare Award for Best Supporting Actress. She then performed in Vijeta (1982), Bazaar (1982), Masoom (1983) and Mirch Masala (1985). She had a minor role in the biopic Gandhi (1982) and starred in the 1988 French film, The Bengali Night. She appeared in Raakh in 1989. In 1985, she played the title role in Malayalam movie Akalathe Ambili.

Her television roles include Idhar Udhar, Ek Mahal Ho Sapno Ka, Khichdi, Baa Bahoo Aur Baby and Chanchan among others.

In 1994, her husband, Pankaj Kapur and she launched their own TV production house, Grass Company. Mohandas B.A.L.L.B was the first serial they produced and acted in under the banner.

After an 11-year hiatus from acting, she starred in the 2005 film Sarkar, followed by its sequel, Sarkar Raj in 2008. She portrayed a subservient mother who tries hard to fill the generation gap with her son in Wake Up Sid (2009). Filmfare magazine called her rendering of the sinister Dhankor Baa in 2013's Goliyon Ki Raasleela Ram-Leela the "watershed of her career". Carry On Kesar (2016) was her first Gujarati film.

== Personal life ==
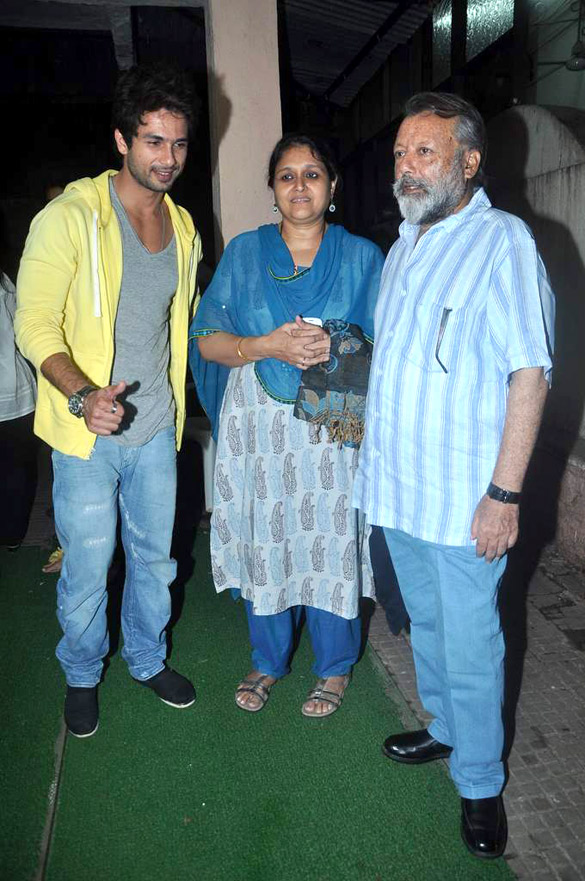
Shahid Kapoor, Supriya Pathak, and Pankaj Kapur attend the screening of Teri Meri Kahaani

At 22, Pathak married, but the couple separated within a year of marriage. In 1986, she met her second husband, Pankaj Kapur, while filming Agla Mausam (1989). After two years of courtship, they married in 1988 and are parents to a daughter, Sanah (born 1993), and a son, Ruhaan (born 1997). On 2 March 2022, her daughter Sanah Kapur married Mayank Pahwa, whereas in September 2023, her son Ruhaan Kapoor married Manukriti Pahwa, both siblings being children of actors Manoj Pahwa and Seema Bhargava Pahwa.

== Filmography ==
Key
†	Denotes films that have not yet been released

=== Film ===
Year	Film	Role	Sources
1981	Kalyug	Subhadra	
1982	Vijeta	Anna Verghese	
1982	Bazar	Shabnam	
1982	Gandhi	Manu	
1983	Bekaraar	Nisha	
1983	Masoom	Bhavana	
1984	Dharm Aur Qanoon	Reshma	
1984	Awaaz	Priya	
1985	Bahu Ki Awaaz	Madhu V. Srivastav	
1985	Mirch Masala	Village Woman	
1985	Akalathe Ambili	Ambili	Malayalam film
1985	Arjun	Sudha Malvankar	
1985	Jhoothi	Seema	
1986	Dilwaala	Kamla	
1988	Shahenshah	Sheena	
1988	The Bengali Night	Gayatri	
1988	Falak	Champa	
1989	Akanksha	Seema	
1989	Kamla Ki Maut	Anju	
1989	Raakh	Nita	
1989	Daata	Suraiya Khan /Suraiya Rao	
1990	Shadyantra	Bilkees	
1994	Madhosh		
2002	Jackpot 2 Crore	Sonu Datta	
2005	Bewafaa		
2005	Sarkar	Pushpa Nagre	
2007	Panga Naa Lo		
2007	Dharm	Parvati Chaturvedi	
2008	Sarkar Raj	Pushpa Nagre	
2009	Delhi 6	Vimla	
2009	Wake Up Sid	Sarita Mehra	
2010	Khichdi: The Movie	Hansa Parekh	
2010	Awasthi	Rukmani	
2011	Mausam	Fatimah Bua	
2012	Shanghai	Chief Minister	
2013	Goliyon Ki Raasleela Ram-Leela	Dhankor "Baa" Sanera	
2014	Bobby Jasoos	Ammi	
2014	Tigers	Ayan's mother	
2015	All Is Well	Parminder "Pammi"	
2015	Kis Kisko Pyaar Karoon	Kapil's mom	
2015	UNindian	Meera's mum	Australian film
2017	Carry On Kesar	Kesar Patel	Gujarati film
2017	Sarkar 3	Pushpa Nagre	
2017	Best of Luck Lalu	Lalu's mom	Gujarati Film
2018	Love per Square Foot	Lata Chaturvedi	
2018	Aravindha Sametha Veera Raghava	Jeji	Telugu film
2019	Gaddalakonda Ganesh	Gaddalakonda Ganesh's mother	Telugu film
2019	Ramprasad Ki Tehrvi	Amma	
2019	Happi	Rukmani	Released on ZEE5
2020	Jai Mummy Di	Laali Khanna	
2021	The Big Bull	Hemant Shah's mother	Released on Disney+ Hotstar
2021	Toofaan	Sister D'Souza	Released on Amazon Prime Video
2021	Mimi	Mimi's mother	Released On Netflix And JioCinema
2021	Rashmi Rocket	Bhanuben Virah Chibber, Rashmi's mother	Released on ZEE5
2022	Kehvatlal Parivar	Kalindi Thakar	Gujarati film
2023	Satyaprem Ki Katha	Diwali	
2023	Khichdi 2: Mission Paanthukistan	Hansa Parekh	
2024	Luv Ki Arrange Marriage	Supriya	
2025	Raid 2	Mrs. Bhankar	
2025	Fari Ek Vaar	Kusum	Gujarati film
2025	Auntypreneur		Gujarati film
2026	Assi		
2026	Yeh Prem Mol Liya †	TBA	
2027	Love & War †	TBA	

=== Television ===
Year	Title	Role	Episodes
1985	Darpan		1 Episode
1985	Idhar Udhar	Poonam	
1986	Katha Sagar	Anuradha / Shabnam	2 Episodes
1987	Naqli Chehra	Asha	Television film
1987	Shahadat		Television film
1987	Zindagi	Kamal Gupta	
1994	Philips Top 10		1 Episode
1997–1998	Idhar Udhar (Season 2)	Poonam	
1998	Mohandas B.A.L.L.B.	Mohini	
1999	Ek Mahal Ho Sapno Ka	Neelu Nanavati	
1999–2000	Zindagi	Kamal	
2002–2004	Khichdi	Hansa Parekh	
2005	Instant Khichdi	Hansa Parekh	
2006	Baa Bahoo Aur Baby	Gunvanti	
2006	Naya Office Office	Mahabali	Cameo
2007–2009	Remote Control	Baari Babulnath	
2010	Taarak Mehta Ka Ooltah Chashmah	Hansa Parekh	Special appearance for promoting Khichdi: The Movie
2012	Alaxmi Ka Super Parivaar	Shanti	
2013	Chhanchhan	Umaben Borisagar	
2014	Tu Mere Agal Bagal Hai	Ganga Mausi	
2015–2016	Jaane Kya Hoga Rama Re	Rambhateri	
2018	Khichdi Returns	Hansa Parekh	
2019	Mere Sai - Shraddha Aur Saburi	Geeta Maa	

=== Web series ===
Year	Title	Role	Platform	Notes
2021	Cartel	Rani Mai	ALTBalaji	
2021	Tabbar	Sargun Kaur	SonyLIV	
2022	Home Shanti	Sarla Joshi	Disney+ Hotstar	

== Awards and nominations ==
Year	Award	Category	Work	Result	Ref.
1982	Filmfare Awards	Best Supporting Actress	Kalyug	Won	
1983	Filmfare Awards	Best Supporting Actress	Bazaar	Won	
2010	Filmfare Awards	Best Supporting Actress	Wake Up Sid	Nominated	
2011	Filmfare Awards	Best Supporting Actress	Khichdi: The Movie	Nominated	
2014	Filmfare Awards	Best Supporting Actress	Goliyon Ki Raasleela Ram-Leela	Won	
2022	Filmfare Awards	Best Actress (Critics)	Ramprasad Ki Tehrvi	Nominated	
2022	Filmfare OTT Awards	Best Actress in a Comedy Series	Home Shanti	Nominated	
2022	Filmfare OTT Awards	Best Supporting Actress in a Drama Series	Tabbar	Won	
2022	FOI Online Awards	Best Actress in a Leading Role	Ramprasad Ki Tehrvi	Nominated	
2022	FOI Online Awards	Best Performance by an Ensemble Cast	Ramprasad Ki Tehrvi	Won	
2010	IIFA Awards	Best Supporting Actress	Wake Up Sid	Nominated	
2014	IIFA Awards	Best Performance in a Negative Role	Goliyon Ki Raasleela Ram-Leela	Nominated	
2004	Indian Television Academy Awards	Best Actress - Comedy	Khichdi	Won	
2008	Indian Television Academy Awards	Best Actress - Comedy	Remote Control	Won	
2003	Indian Telly Awards	Best Actress in a Comic Role	Khichdi	Won	
2004	Indian Telly Awards	Best Actress in a Comic Role	Khichdi	Nominated	
2005	Indian Telly Awards	Best Actress in a Comic Role	Instant Khichdi	Won	
2008	Indian Telly Awards	Best Actress in a Comic Role	Remote Control	Nominated	
2006	Producers Guild Film Awards	Best Actress in a Drama Series	Instant Khichdi	Nominated	
2009	Producers Guild Film Awards	Best Actress in a Supporting Role	Sarkar Raj	Nominated	
2010	Producers Guild Film Awards	Best Actress in a Supporting Role	Wake Up Sid	Nominated	
2014	Producers Guild Film Awards	Best Actor in a Negative Role	Goliyon Ki Raasleela Ram-Leela	Won	
2014	Screen Awards	Best Actor in a Negative Role	Goliyon Ki Raasleela Ram-Leela	Nominated	
2014	Zee Cine Awards	Best Actor in a Negative Role	Goliyon Ki Raasleela Ram-Leela	Won	
