= Satarupa Pyne =

Indian model and actress

- Born: 1996 (age 29–30); Kolkata, India
- Education: Masters in English
- Occupations: Actress, Supermodel
- Years active: 2011–present

Satarupa Pyne is an Indian supermodel and actress. Satarupa made her Bollywood debut with Madhur Bhandarkar's drama film Calendar Girls. Her second film was the Bengali production Meher Aali, directed by Arindam Nandi. Her most acclaimed project to date is London Dreams, in which she played a maid. She played the lead in the Viacom production Fuh Se Fantasy, for which she received widespread critical acclaim. She played the lead again in the Zee5 original Bhalobashar Shahor, dubbed Pyar Se in Hindi.

== Modelling career ==
Satarupa is a supermodel. She is an experienced supermodel who has appeared in numerous campaigns and at fashion weeks . She has also served as a brand ambassador for Gaja Jewels, PC Chandra, Sabyasachi, Senco Gold, Antara Jewellery, Tanishq, and Malabar Gold.

== Film career ==
Madhur Bhandarkar signed her as one of his five leading ladies in the film Calendar Girls.

== Filmography ==
Year	Film	Role	Language	Notes
2015	Calendar Girls	Paroma Ghosh	Hindi	Debut
2017	Meher Aali		Bengali	
2019	Body Massage	Nandini	Bengali	TV movie
2022	Fuh Se Fantasy	Kiara	Hindi	
2024	London Dreams	Sangeeta	Hindi	
