= Prachee Shah Paandya =

Indian actress and Kathak dancer

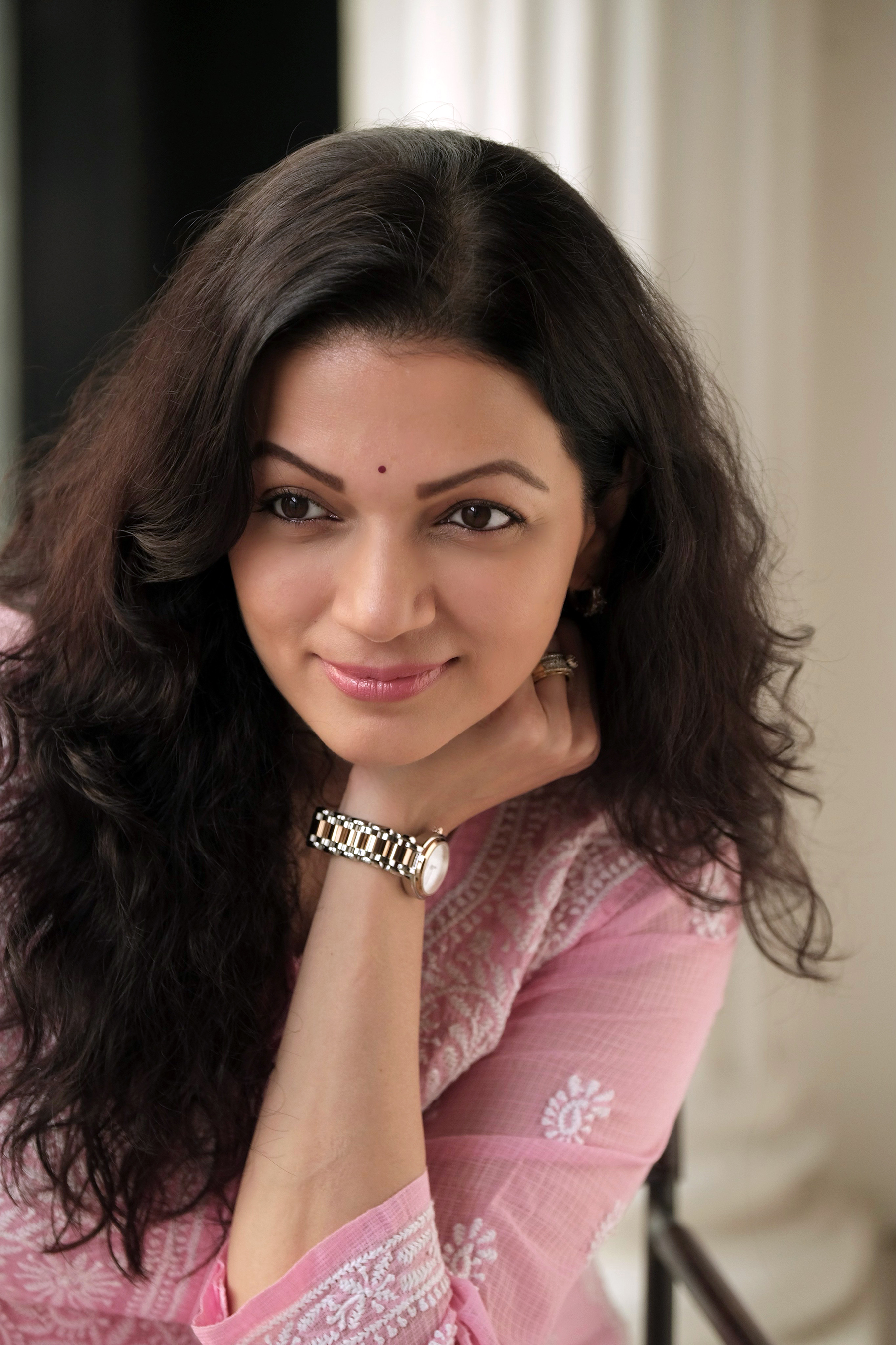
- Born: Mumbai, Maharashtra, India
- Occupations: Model, Actress
- Years active: 2000–present
- Spouse: Vishwas Paandya (m. 2005)
- Children: 1

Prachee Shah Paandya, also known as Prachi Shah, is an Indian actress and Kathak dancer who appears in Hindi and Gujarati films and television. She is best known for her role as Pooja Hemant Virani in Ekta Kapoor's Kyunki Saas Bhi Kabhi Bahu Thi

== Early life and career ==
Shah is a Gujarati Jain by birth but her family has lived in Maharashtra for three generations. In an interview she admitted not knowing how to speak Gujarati but being fluent in Marathi because of her upbringing.

She is a trained Kathak dancer and has performed in dance shows both nationally and internationally. She trained with her guru Ganesh Hiralal ji, of the seventh generation of the Hiralal family of the Jaipur gharana and holds the Guinness World Record for performing 93 spins in one minute and in 2015 was appointed as the Kathak ambassador by the Government of India.

In 2019, Shah attended the Cannes Film Festival moderating a session discussing women in global cinema.

== Personal life ==
Shah has been married to filmmaker Vishwas Paandya since 9 December 2005. She gave birth to their daughter Khiana in 2009 and subsequently took a year off from work.

== Filmography ==
=== Film ===
Year	Title	Roles	Language	Notes
2000	Hey Ram	Lavani Dancer	Tamil	Simultaneously shot in Hindi
2005	Pak Pak Pakaak	Bhutya/Sakharam's wife	Marathi	
2010	Isi Life Mein	Pragriti Khandelwal	Hindi	
2011	Haunted – 3D	Mrs. Stephens	Hindi	
2012	Ichar Tharla Pakka	Radhika	Marathi	
2012	Student of the Year	Mrs. Shah	Hindi	
2013	Akaash Vani	Vani's Maami	Hindi	
2014	Raja Natwarlal	Raghav's wife	Hindi	
2015	ABCD 2	Padmashri Durga Devi	Hindi	
2017	Shubh Aarambh	Manasvi	Gujarati	
2017	Judwaa 2	Ankita Malhotra	Hindi	
2018	Mulk	Choti Tabassum	Hindi	
2020	Laxmii	Girija's wife	Hindi	
2021	Hum Do Hamare Do	Rupa Mehra	Hindi	
2022	Rashtra Kavach Om	Yashvi	Hindi	
2023	Chhatriwali	Nisha Kalra	Hindi	
2024	Udan Chhoo		Gujarati	
2024	Do Patti	Shobhana Pundir	Hindi	

=== Television ===
Year	Title	Role	Notes
2000-2004	Kyunki Saas Bhi Kabhi Bahu Thi	Pooja Hemant Virani	
2000–2002	Koshish Ek Asha	Bhavna	
2001	Manzilein Apani Apani	Priya	
2000–2001	Kundali	Vidhi Viraj Agarwal	
2002	Kahin Diyaa Jale Kahin Jiyaa	Payal	
2003	Piya Ka Ghar	Yashoda Rakesh Sharma	
2002-2008	Bhabhi	Seema	
2003-2005	Karan - The Detective	Namita	
2006–2008	Rangoli	Herself / Host	
2006–2007	Kesar	Kesar	
2007–2009	Kayamath	Premlata Shah	
2009–2010	Yeh Pyar Na Hoga Kam	Mrs. Brijbhushan Mathur	
2013–2015	Iss Pyaar Ko Kya Naam Doon? Ek Baar Phir	Kalindi Kirloskar	
2016–2017	Ek Shringaar-Swabhiman	Sharda Solanki	
2019	Modi: Journey of a Common Man	Jashodaben Narendrabhai Modi	
2026	Adarsh Baal Vidyalaya	Sushma Tripathy	
