= Deepti Sadhwani =

Indian actress and singer

Deeppti Sadhwani
- Born: Lucknow, India
- Occupations: Actress, model, singer

Deepti Sadhwani is an Indian actress and singer. Sadhwani has a background in finance, but is now known for her work in TV, film and music videos.

== Early life and education ==
Sadhwani was born and brought up in Lucknow, India. She has an MBA in Finance from the Jaipuria Institute of Management. She also did CA and ICWA. She started her career as an investment banker in Mumbai.

== Entertainment career ==
She won the title of Miss North India and took part in Femina Miss India where she was a regional finalist.

Sadhwani appeared in the television series Taarak Mehta Ka Ooltah Chashmah and also hosted a reality show named Hasya Samrat, which was aired on Zee Marathi.

She has also appeared in movies like Nazar Hati Durghatana Ghati and Rock Band Party where she played the lead role. In the 2020 lockdown she made three music videos named Harayana Roadway, Toot Jaayein, Lala Lala Lori.

== Filmography ==
=== Television ===
- Taarak Mehta Ka Ooltah Chashmah
- Hasya Samrat

=== Films ===
- Nazar Hati Durghatana Ghati
- Rock Band Party

== Music videos ==
- Harayana Roadway
- Toot Jaayein
- Lalla Lalla Lori
- Butterfly Waale
- Tu Aag Ka Gola Chori
