= Angad Bedi =

Indian actor (born 1983)

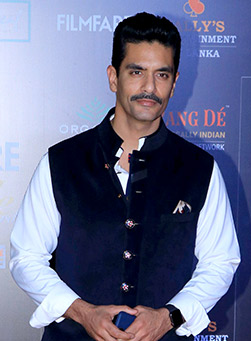
- Bedi at the Filmfare Awards in 2019
- Born: Angad Singh Bedi; 6 February 1983 (age 43); Delhi, India
- Education: St. Stephen's College
- Occupations: Actor; model
- Years active: 2004–present
- Spouse: Neha Dhupia (m. 2018)
- Children: 2
- Parent: Bishan Singh Bedi (father)

Angad Singh Bedi (born 6 February 1983) is an Indian actor and former model. He made his debut with Kaya Taran in 2004, an adaptation of a Malayalam short story by N. S. Madhavan. He has acted in the film F.A.L.T.U in 2011 and known for his roles in Pink (2016), Dear Zindagi (2016), Tiger Zinda Hai (2017) and Hi Nanna (2023).

== Early life and education ==
Bedi was born to former Indian cricket captain Bishan Singh Bedi. He has one elder sister, Neha, and two older half-siblings from his father's previous marriage – a half-sister named Gillinder and a half-brother named Gavasinder. He played cricket up to Under-19 level for Delhi. He studied at Gyan Bharati School, Saket, New Delhi and graduated from St. Stephen's College, Delhi. Subsequently, he began a career in modelling, and ventured into acting.

== Career ==
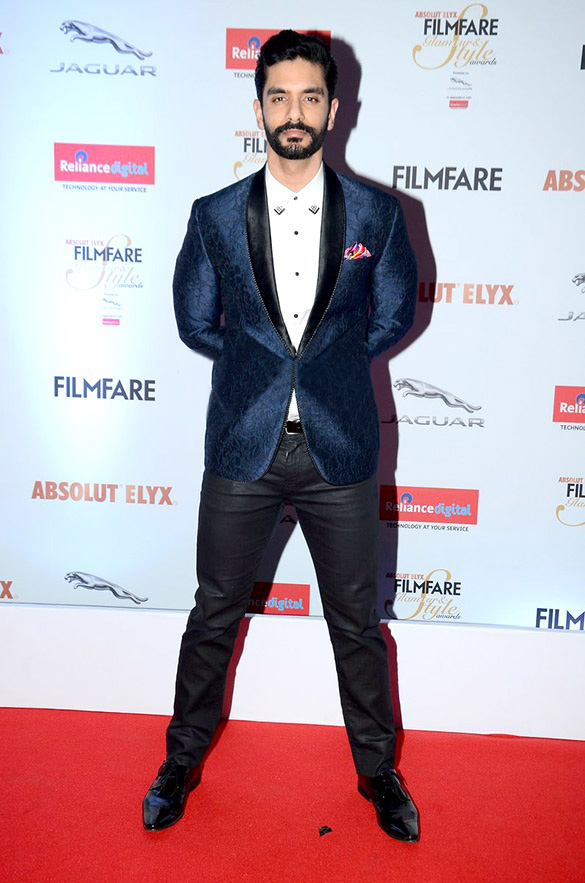
Bedi at an event in 2016

Bedi started his career with the film Kaya Taran, directed by Sashi Kumar in 2004. The film was set against the backdrop of 2002 Gujarat riots and 1984 anti-Sikh riots. The film won the Aravindan Puraskaram, given to the best maiden film-maker, for 2004 and Bedi's performance in the film was appreciated.

In 2005, he appeared in a cooking show called Cook Na Kaho on Star One as a host. He hosted Extraaa Innings T20 in 2010, a show telecasted in between the match sessions during the Indian Premier League (IPL) along with Ayushmann Khurrana. He appeared as a contestant in Season 3 of Colors' show Fear Factor: Khatron Ke Khiladi. He also hosted the first season of the reality television show Emotional Atyachar on UTV Bindass before being replaced by Pravesh Rana.

He returned to Bollywood in 2011 with the film F.A.L.T.U, directed by Remo D'Souza. Bedi is best known for his performances in works such as Ungli (2014) and PINK (2016). He was also seen In Tiger Zinda Hai with Salman Khan.

In 2017 he starred as the lead in Amazon's original series Inside Edge. He was also a part of Gunjan Saxena: The Kargil Girl, the biopic of the Indian Air Force pilot Gunjan Saxena, in which he played the role of her brother. He was also part of Soorma, the biopic of Sandeep Singh, the former captain of the Indian hockey team, where he played the role of his brother as well. The actor has been the part of The Zoya Factor.

== Personal life ==
In 2012, Bedi was arrested after allegedly consuming drugs at a rave party at a Suburban Juhu Hotel. He tested positive along with 85 others for the consumption of cannabis and ecstasy, and was later released on bail.

Bedi married Neha Dhupia in a private ceremony at a Gurdwara on 10 May 2018. The couple have a daughter, born on 18 November 2018, and a son, born on 3 October 2021.

== Filmography ==
=== Films ===
Year	Title	Role	Notes	Ref.
2004	Kaya Taran	Preet		
2011	F.A.L.T.U	Niranjan "Nanj" Nair		
2013	Rangeelay	Ricky / Vicky	Punjabi film; Double role	
2014	Ungli	Kalim		
2016	Pink	Rajveer Singh		
2016	Dear Zindagi	Sid		
2017	Tiger Zinda Hai	Namit Khanna		
2018	Soorma	Bikramjeet Singh		
2019	The Zoya Factor	Robin Rawal		
2020	Gunjan Saxena: The Kargil Girl	Anshuman Saxena	Netflix release	
2023	Lust Stories 2	Arjun Bhalla	Netflix anthology film	
2023	Ghoomer	Jeet		
2023	Hi Nanna	Dr. Aravind	Telugu film	

=== Television ===
Year	Title	Role	Notes	Ref.
2005	Cook Na Kaho	Host		
2010	Extraaa Innings T20	Host		
2010	Fear Factor: Khatron Ke Khiladi	Contestant	Season 3	
2011	Emotional Atyachar	Host	Season 1	
2016	24	Dhruv Awasthi		

=== Web series ===
Year	Title	Role	Platform	Ref.
2017	Inside Edge	Arvind Vashishth	Amazon Prime Video	
2019	The Verdict - State vs. Nanavati	Karl Jamshed Khandalavala	ALTBalaji, ZEE5	
2019	Inside Edge (Season 2)	Arvind Vashishth	Amazon Prime Video	
2020	Mum Bhai	Bhaskar Shetty	ALTBalaji, ZEE5	

=== Music video appearances ===
Year	Title	Singer(s)	Label	Ref.
2021	"Baithe Baithe"	Stebin Ben, Danish Sabri, Aishwarya Pandit	Zee Music Company	
2021	"Main Bhi Barbaad"	Yasser Desai	Saregama	
