= Tarun Vijay =

Indian writer & politician

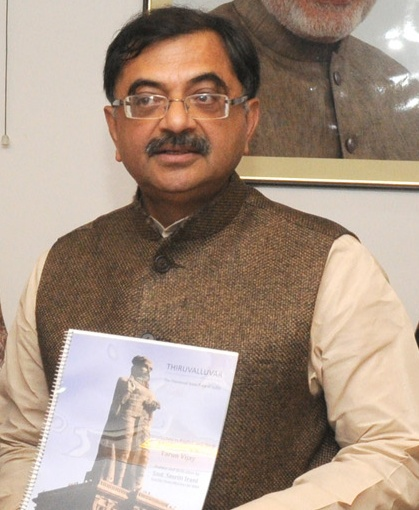

Member of Parliament, Rajya Sabha
- In office July 2010 – July 2016
- Preceded by: Satish Sharma
- Succeeded by: Pradeep Tamta
- Constituency: Uttarakhand

Personal details
- Born: 2 March 1956 (age 70)
- Party: Bharatiya Janata Party
- Children: 2
- Education: B.A.
- Occupation: Journalism, author, social worker, politician

Tarun Vijay (born 2 March 1956) is an Indian author, social worker and journalist. He was the editor of the Rashtriya Swayamsevak Sangh (RSS) weekly in Hindi, Panchajanya, from 1986 to February 2008. He also writes for the Daily Pioneer.

He was also elected member of Rajya Sabha till his Term ended in July 2016, of the upper house of Indian Parliament "RajyaSabha" and president of Parliamentary Group on India China Friendship. He is also member of Parliamentary Standing Committee on Defence Ministry and Parliamentary Consultative Committee on External Affairs. He is also a member of Board of Governors, Parliamentary Network on World Bank and IMF.

== Career ==
Tarun Vijay joined Panchajanya in 1986 as executive editor, after a decade of freelance journalism and work among the tribal people in Dadra and Nagar Haveli as a pracharak of Bharatiya Vanavasi Kalyan Ashram.

Vijay joined Panchjanya in 1979. He has been Chief Editor for 20 years. The first editor of the 60-year-old Panchjanya was former Prime Minister Atal Bihari Vajpayee.

A journalist since 1976, he began his career with Russi Karanjia at the Mumbai-based tabloid Blitz and then as a freelance journalist for major dailies and magazines before spending five years as an RSS activist in the country's tribal areas.

In the years as editor of Panchajanya, he has visited various parts of the country, and various countries.

Tarun Vijay, on 4 April 2013, first raised the issue by writing to the Survey of India about what he claimed was a "major threat to national security." Mr. Vijay said Google has already provided maps where many "strategic locations" have been marked like Parliament, Sena Bhawan, and various ministries. "A criminal case should be registered against Google for violating Indian defence regulations."

In May 2016, Vijay was attacked by a mob for leading a group of Dalits to the Silgur Devta Temple in the Punah village which is nearly 180 km from Dehradun. As per reports, trouble started when Vijay and his group touched the Devi Doli, which according to local belief should not be touched by someone from a local caste. The violence that erupted caused Vijay injuries to his head and ears. The mob also damaged his car by pushing it down a nearby gorge.

He is actively contributing for many newspapers and websites as a freelance columnist, and Prabhasakshi a Hindi-based news portal is one of them.

== Views ==
Tarun Vijay is critical of the partition of India, faulting the British for it, and advocates for Indian reunification due to the common cultural thread that he states runs throughout the subcontinent.

== Books ==
- An Odyssey in Tibet: Pilgrimage of Kailash Mansarovar, Ritwik Prakashan, Jan 2001, ISBN 81-900571-2-X
- Saffron Surge, India's Re-emergence on the Global Scene and Hindu Ethos, Har Anand, Nov 2008, ISBN 978-81-241-1338-7.
- Mere Sapno Ka Bharat, 2019.

== Awards ==
- Vijay became the first non Tamil to receive the prestigious 'Aruntamizh Aarvalar Award' by Kamban Academy.

== Controversy ==
Following mob attacks on African students in India, Vijay gave an interview to Al Jazeera English, He made a few controversial comments on India, which were widely criticised. News channels like NDTV, had conducted several debates regarding this issue. Soon after giving a racist justification, again to defend his words against racism, he took a turn and tweeted 'I have Tamils and Bengalis in my family'. Which was widely criticised.
