= Kaak (cartoonist) =

Indian artist (1940–2025)

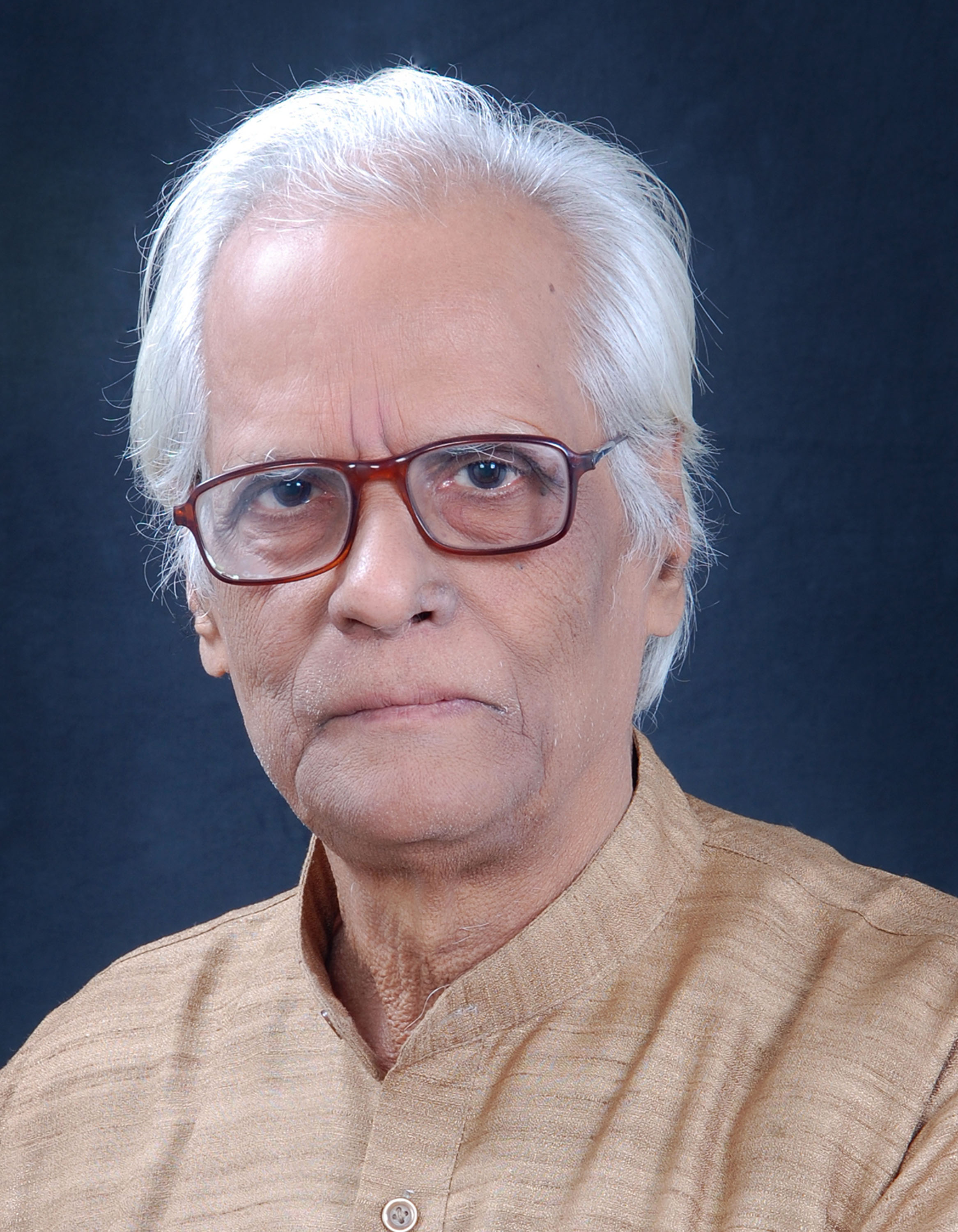
- Born: Harish Chandra Shukla; 16 March 1940; Puranisf Pansari, Unnao District, United Provinces, British India
- Died: 1 January 2025 (aged 84); Gaziabad, Uttar Pradesh, India
- Occupation: Cartoonist
- Years active: 1967–2024
- Website: kaaktoons.com

Harish Chandra Shukla (16 March 1940 – 1 January 2025), known by his pen name Kaak, was an Indian editorial cartoonist and caricaturist who worked in Hindi-language media. He worked with leading newspapers such as Jansatta, Navbharat Times, Dainik Jagran, Rajasthan Patrika, and a few others, in a career spanning several decades. 'Kaak' means crow in Hindi, which according to a proverb, is the bird that raises its raucous voice when someone tells a lie.

== Early life ==
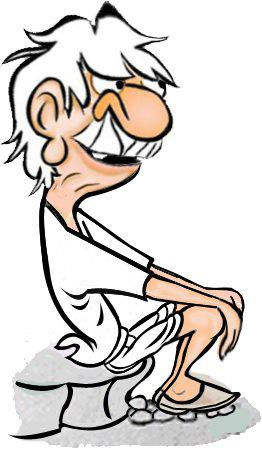
Kaak's Everyman

Kaak was born 16 March 1940, at village Pura, Unnao, Uttar Pradesh, the son of a freedom fighter. He trained to work as a mechanical engineer, but gave up the field to pursue cartooning.

== Career ==
His first cartoon was published in Dainik Jagran in 1967. He has worked as an editorial cartoonist with Jansatta (Indian Express group) from 1983 to 1985 and with Navbharat Times (Times of India group) from July 1985 to Jan 1999. He has also been published in Dinman, Shankar's Weekly, Current, Blitz, Ravivar, Itwari Patrika, Dharamyug, and Saptahik Hindustan. National Hindi dailies such as Dainik Jagran, Aaj, Navjeevan, Rajasthan Patrika, and Amar Ujala have carried his work. He contributed to the webportal Prabhasakshi.

He was also elected as the first president of Cartoonists' Club of India.

Kaak was very commonly called the Cartoonist of masses, adding that he understood the problems of the people at the grassroots level. Yet, unlike Laxman’s Common Man, Kaak’s Everyman is not a spectator to the goings-on. He is a commentator. Kaak’s female characters too are characters.

== Death ==
Kaak died from a heart attack on 1 January 2025, at the age of 84.

== Awards and honours ==
- Honored with "Kaka Hathrasi Samman" by Hindi Academy Delhi: 2003
- Honored by Kerala Lalit Kala Academy and Kerala Cartoon Academy during cartoon camp at Ernakulam (Kochi): 2009
- Felicitated with Lifetime Achievement Award by Indian Institute of Cartoonists, Bangalore : 2009
- Felicitated with Lifetime Achievement Award by Dr. A. P. J. Abdul Kalam at Cartoon Festival, New Delhi, under the auspices of Cartoon Watch: 2011
- National Award for the excellence in journalism, 2016; organised by Press Council of India: 2017

== Books ==
- Nazariya, a collection of selected cartoons from day to day issues, compiled by Vinod Bhardwaj, published by Rupa & Co. : 1989
- Kargil Kartoons, During Kargil War, with a support of the cartoons of seven other leading cartoonists, a collection of cartoons dedicated to the Indian defense forces: 1999
- Laugh as you Travel, on the occasion of completing 150 glorious years of Indian Railways a collection of 50 cartoons made by Kaak and Shekhar Gurera : 2000

== Reception ==
- Like Charlie Brown, ultimately the appeal of Kaak's persona, lies in his ability to laugh and feel ashamed at human folly : Mrinal Pandey (Editor-in-chief Dainik Hindustan, Hindustan Times Publications)
- I am speaker of Loksabha (Parliament) merely with five hundred members, while Kaak is speaker of Loksabha with members in millions : Balram Jakhar (Speaker of Lok Sabha, 16 December 1986, Public Honour in Haridwar)
