= The Verdict – State vs Nanavati =

Indian web series

- First look poster
- Genre: Courtroom Drama; Mystery
- Created by: Ekta Kapoor
- Based on: K. M. Nanavati v. State of Maharashtra
- Developed by: Samar Khan; Lawrence D'Souza
- Written by: Pooja Tolani; Rahul Patel
- Directed by: Shashant Shah
- Creative directors: Subhash Kapoor; Baljit Singh Chaddha; Irada Entertainment
- Country of origin: India
- Original languages: Hindi; English
- No. of seasons: 1
- No. of episodes: 10 (list of episodes)

Production
- Executive producer: Mayur Shah
- Producer: Falguni Patel
- Production locations: Mumbai, Maharashtra, India
- Cinematography: Mohana Krishna
- Editors: Yasha Ramchandani; Hemanth Kumar
- Camera setup: Multi-camera
- Running time: 18-23 minutes
- Production company: Irada Entertainment

Original release
- Network: ALT Balaji; ZEE5
- Release: 30 September 2019

The Verdict – State vs Nanavati is a 2019 Indian Hindi drama mystery web series created by Ekta Kapoor and produced by Irada Entertainment for online streaming platform ALT Balaji and ZEE5. It is also available on ZEE5. The series stars Manav Kaul, Elli AvrRam, Sumeet Vyas and Viraf Patel as protagonists.

== Plot ==
The series is based on the 1959 Indian judiciary case, K. M. Nanavati v. State of Maharashtra, where an Indian Naval Command Officer, Kawas Nanavati is accused of the murder of Prem Ahuja. The series explores how Nanavati returns home after a successful mission to find out that his wife Sylvia Nanavati is having an affair with his close friend Prem Ahuja because he cannot fulfill her desires as he is away for his duty. The series is an intriguing tale of jealousy, murder, mystery, political drama and Indian judiciary.

== Cast ==
- Manav Kaul as Kawas Manekshaw Nanavati
- Elli AvrRam as Sylvia Nanavati
- Sumeet Vyas as Ram Jethmalani
- Viraf Patel as Prem Ahuja
- Makrand Deshpande as Chandu Trivedi
- Soni Razdan as Mehra Nanavati
- Saurabh Shukla as Russi Karanjia
- Ivan Rodrigues as Admiral Katari
- Swanand Kirkire as Justice R.B.Mehta
- Angad Bedi as Karl Khandalavala
- Kubbra Sait as Mamie Ahuja
- Pooja Gaur as Vidya Munshi
- Rajesh Khera as Inspector John Lobo
- Avijit Dutt as V. K. Krishna Menon
- Shruti Bapna as Mrs Trivedi
- Rio Kapadia as Manekshaw Nanavati
- Kurush Deboo as S.R. Vakil
- Deepak Kriplani as Jawaharlal Nehru
- Bikramjeet Kanwarpal as Major Kohli
- Ram Gopal Bajaj as Bhai Pratap
- Khurshed Lawyer as Homi
- Nabeel Ahmed as Nitesh
- Dadhi Pandey as Reginald Pierce
- Susheel Pandey as Karunesh Pandey
- Rushad Rana as J R D Tata
- Satish Naykodi as Ganesh Gawaskar
- Pramod Ghosh as Father Hoffman
- Vaibhav Anand as Dev Anand
- Lopamudra Raut as Tabassum
- Pooja Gor as Vidya Joshi
- Anisa Butt as Sheetal
- Jasbir Thandi as Trilok Singh

== Songs ==
- Midnight Walks- Broken Echoes
- You Make Me Whole- Broken Echoes
- Stop Dancing- Vernon D'Souza

== Episodes ==
No. overall	No. in season	Title	Directed by	Written by	Original release date
1	1	"Law Abiding Citizen"	Shashant Shah	Pooja Tolani and Rahul Patel	30 September 2019
2	2	"The Runaway Jury"	Shashant Shah	Pooja Tolani and Rahul Patel	30 September 2019
3	3	"Rules of Engagement"	Shashant Shah	Pooja Tolani and Rahul Patel	30 September 2019
4	4	"State of Play"	Shashant Shah	Pooja Tolani and Rahul Patel	30 September 2019
5	5	"Anatomy of Murder"	Shashant Shah	Pooja Tolani and Rahul Patel	30 September 2019
6	6	"In the Bedroom"	Shashant Shah	Pooja Tolani and Rahul Patel	30 September 2019
7	7	"Find Me Guilty"	Shashant Shah	Pooja Tolani and Rahul Patel	30 September 2019
8	8	"The Devil’s Advocate"	Shashant Shah	Pooja Tolani and Rahul Patel	30 September 2019
9	9	"The Verdict"	Shashant Shah	Pooja Tolani and Rahul Patel	30 September 2019
10	10	"Justice for All"	Shashant Shah	Pooja Tolani and Rahul Patel	30 September 2019
