= 2015 cash-for-votes scam =

Indian political scandal

The 2015 cash-for-votes scam was a political scandal in India, the second scandal of its kind since the 2008 cash-for-votes scandal. The 2015 political scandal started off when the Telugu Desam Party (TDP) leaders of Telangana state were caught in a video footage, aired in the media, offering bribes to a nominated MLA, Elvis Stephenson, for his vote in the 2015 elections of the Telangana Legislative Council. The TDP MLA Revanth Reddy was arrested by the Telangana Police when he was offering Rs. 50 lakhs to Stephenson. Reddy was then presented before the court and was sent to jail. Similarly, with N. Chandrababu Naidu, the then Andhra Pradesh Chief Minister, with Stephenson was aired in the news media.

The Telugu Desam party alleged that the scandal was a political vendetta, doctored by the Telangana State Government under the direction of K. Chandrashekhar Rao, the Chief Minister of Telangana, alongside the YSR Congress Party. In a further development, The High Court of Judicature at Hyderabad for the States of Andhra Pradesh, and Telangana, granted bail to Revanth Reddy and two other co-accused due to lack of substantial evidence.

== Background ==
=== Events and allegations ===
The elections for the Council of Telangana Assembly were initiated and the notification for six upper house seats were released. Five candidates from Telangana Rashtra Samithi (TRS), one from Congress and one from TDP got ready to contest the elections. TDP and allied Bharatiya Janata Party (BJP) together does not have enough votes to win the contest. Then the news came out that they were trying to get votes from other parties. TDP President Chandrababu Naidu conducted meetings to analyze this matter, and based on his suggestion the leaders of TDP got into action. The rival parties have sensed that they are attempting to lure their MLA's, so the respective party leaders became cautious. In this process, a high drama took place at Stephenson's place. The TDP MLA Revanth Reddy met Stephenson with the help of an aide. Following Revanth's suggestion this aide tried to deliver Rs.50 lakh currency bundles. The videos of Revanth Reddy during this transaction turned out to be critical and aired on TV news channels.

== Video footage leak ==
The video recording shows that Revanth Reddy spoke several matters with Stephenson. He mentioned that he is the active leader in Telangana and also said that his ‘Boss’ assigns crucial matters only to him. He assured that everything will be taken care by "Boss" and mentioned that he reported about money matter. He stressed that everything is done based on Boss instruction. Authorities arrested Revanth Reddy and later the video was telecasted in media. Everyone understood that when a Party MLA refers someone as ‘Boss’ repeatedly, it may be none other than the Party President Chandrababu Naidu.

== Stephenson arguments ==
As per the arguments of nominated MLA Stephenson, it is coming to know that Chandrababu was the one who doctored the entire episode. The sequential events began on May 28 when one by name Mattaiah met Stephenson. Mattaiah tried to offer cash in regard to MLC elections. But, Stephenson approached ACB authorities believing that it is unethical. Later Sebastian, another person from TDP and after him Revanth Reddy entered the course of events. On May 30 Sebastian along with Revanth Reddy went straight to Stephenson's residence to negotiate the deal. The duo told him that a secret meeting with Chandrababu will be arranged. The same day evening they made him speak to Chandrababu over phone. Chandrababu assured him that he will take care of everything and mentioned that his persons informed him about the deal. He then assured him that the promises will be honored. The next day i.e., on May 31 Revanth Reddy along with his aides met Stephenson with cash. The ACB Authorities who were already on alert arrested Revanth Reddy.

== Audio leak ==
An audio tape came into light, in which Naidu spoke to Stephenson. Based on what was aired in the TV news channels, Chandrababu Naidu had a phone conversation with Stephenson which he allegedly said that his men told him everything, he would look into Stephenson's matter, and that promises would be honoured. AP government advisor Parakala Prabhakar rubbished the claims and said that the audio was not of Naidu. He also questioned the source and validity of the audio.

== Chandrababu Naidu's course of action ==
The Andhra Pradesh Chief Minister Chandrababu Naidu took this seriously as discussions on this issue was propagating throughout the State. He focused all his attention on this matter for several days and conducted meetings and reviews with Police higher officials. He immediately sacked the then intelligence chief Mrs. Anuradha for failing to grab information about Telangana ACB plans. The word spread rapidly that the chief initiator behind this scandal was Telugu Desam President Chandrababu Naidu after the arrest of party legislator Revanth Reddy in the scandal.

== Legal proceedings ==
In May 2021, the Enforcement Directorate filed a chargesheet against Revanth Reddy in connection with the scam. In October 2023, 2 months before the 2023 Telangana Legislative Assembly election, the Supreme Court dismissed his plea challenging the ACB court's decision to reject his request in 2021. In February 2024, the Supreme Court heard an appeal and transferred the case to a trial court in Bhopal to ensure that a fair trial takes place. In April 2024, it deferred the case until July.

== See also ==
- List of scandals in India
- Corruption in India
- 2011 Indian anti-corruption movement
