= Sreebala K. Menon =

Indian film director

Sreebala K Menon
- Education: C-DIT, Trivandrum
- Occupation: Filmmaker; Author
- Notable work: 19, Canal Road; Slyviaplathinte Master Piece; Panthibhojanam (short film); Love 24x7 (feature film)

Sreebala K. Menon is a Malayali author and filmmaker who won the 2005 Kerala Sahitya Akademi Award - 'Best Humor writing' for her book 19, Canal Road. She has published a collection of short stories named 'Slyviaplathinte Masterpiece' by Mathrubhumi Books. Love 24x7 was her debut movie in Malayalam, in which she won her Kerala State Film Award and Ramu Kariat Award. (Best debutant director 2015) She is married to Jimmy James, Executive Editor at Media One.

== Education ==
Sreebala has done her post-graduation in English literature from Madras University. She got trained in science and development communication at C-DIT, Trivandrum.

== Film career ==
Sreebala K. menon has directed the film Love 24x7, Starring Dileep and debutante Nikhila Vimal in lead roles while Suhasini, Sashi Kumar, Lena and Sreenivasan plays the supporting roles. Love 24x7 is a romantic comedy film written by Sreebala herself. The movie won her Kerala State Film Award and Ramu Kariat Award for the Best Debutant Director 2015.

Sreebala's 20-minute short film in 2009 Panthibhojanam, received good reviews for its take on caste. The theme of the film draws on different ideas of food; shared food between friends, food that is untouchable for one caste, but a delicacy for another, and the food of the community feast that can be collectively cooked and eaten. Her short film Journey from Darkness to Light won third prize at the Ability Fest 2005. Menon worked with director Sathyan Anthikad on many movies.

== Controversy ==
On 28 April 2004, Sreebala approached the State Women's Commission (SWC) against the residents' association office-bearers of her flat complex, alleging that they have been intruding into her personal life to the point of harassment. The complaint was filed jointly by the owner of the flat, Dr. J. Devika, a researcher at the Centre for Development Studies and Ms. Menon to whom she had let out the flat. Since she was single woman, visitors to her flat were asked to jot down their names in a book, which she considered to be a breach of her privacy.

This incident sparked off a debate on the right to privacy of the tenant and the problems faced by working women when they search for accommodation. V. Shantaram, director, State Women's Commission, said on the issue that "We shall initiate appropriate action. The Constitution also provides special protection to women and any sort of physical or verbal harassment can be brought to the notice of the police officials. No woman should tolerate such unfair treatment."

== Filmography ==
- Journey from Darkness to Light (2005) – Short Film
- Panthibhojanam (2009) – Short Film
- Love 24x7 (2015) – Debut Film
