= K. M. Nanavati v. State of Maharashtra =

1959 Indian Court case

- Court: Supreme Court of India
- Full case name: K. M. Nanavati v. State of Maharashtra

Case history
- Prior actions: Jury's Judgment for defendant, Jury () Trial-Charge-Misdirection-Reference by Judge, High Court Conviction under Sec.302 of the Indian Penal Code
- Subsequent action: Appeal dismissed

Court membership
- Judges sitting: K. Subbarao, S. K. Das, Raghubar Dayal

Case opinions
- Appellant Commander Nanavati, a Naval Officer, was put up on trial under sec. 290 and 304 Part I of the Indian Penal Code (IPC) for alleged murder of his wife's paramour. The High Court dismissed the earlier acquittal by a Jury Trial and convicted the accused to life imprisonment under Sec. 302 of IPC.

K. M. Nanavati vs. State of Maharashtra was a 1959 Indian court case where Kawas Manekshaw Nanavati, a Naval Commander, was tried for the murder of Prem Ahuja, his wife's lover. Commander Nanavati, accused under section 302, was initially found not guilty by a jury, but the verdict was quashed by the Bombay High Court and the case was retried as a bench trial. The case is often erroneously believed to be the last jury trial in India, but there were several trials afterwards that used juries, some well into the 1960s. Nanavati was finally pardoned by Vijaya Lakshmi Pandit, the newly appointed Governor of Maharashtra and sister of Prime Minister Jawaharlal Nehru.

The incident received unprecedented media coverage and inspired several books and films, including 1963 film Yeh Rastey Hain Pyar Ke, the 1973 film Achanak, the 1983 film Asthram, the 2016 film Rustom, and the 2019 web series The Verdict - State vs Nanavati.

== Background ==
Cmdr. Nanavati in 1959

Kawas Manekshaw Nanavati (May 1925 — 24 July 2003), a Parsi, was a Commander in the Indian Navy who had settled in Bombay with Sylvia (née King), his English-born wife and their two sons and a daughter.

With Nanavati frequently away from home on assignments for long periods of time, Sylvia fell in love with Prem Bhagwandas Ahuja, a close Sindhi friend of the Nanavatis. In her testimony in court, Prem's sister, Mamie Ahuja, stated that Prem had agreed to marry Sylvia, provided she divorced her husband. However, this was contradicted by the letters written by Sylvia (admitted as Sylvia's testimony), in which she expressed her desire to divorce Nanavati and marry Prem, but she doubted whether Prem had the same intentions. In a letter, she wrote, "Last night when you spoke of your marrying me and the various other girls you might marry, something inside me snapped and I knew I could not bear the thought of you loving someone else".

== Shooting ==
Portrait of Sylvia Nanavati

On 27 April 1959, Nanavati returned home from one of his assignments and, finding Sylvia aloof and distant, he questioned her. Sylvia, who now doubted Prem's intention to marry her, confessed the affair to her husband. Nanavati dropped his family at the Metro Cinema, for the film Tom Thumb he had promised to take them to, but excused himself and headed straight to confront Prem Ahuja. When Sylvia was asked in court why she went to the cinema, leaving her agitated husband behind, she answered, "I was upset myself, and I did not think clearly then. I was not indifferent to my husband killing himself… It is difficult to explain these things to children, so I took them to the cinema."

Nanavati went to the naval base, collected his pistol on a false pretext from the stores along with six bullets, completed his official duties and proceeded to Ahuja's office. On not finding him there, he went to Ahuja's flat and found him there. There was a verbal confrontation between the two men; according to Nanavati's account related in court, he had asked Ahuja whether the latter intended to marry Sylvia and accept their children. After Ahuja replied in the negative, three shots were fired and Ahuja dropped dead. Nanavati headed straight to confess his crime to Mr. Michael Benjamin Samuel, the Indian Jewish Provost Marshal of the Western Naval Command and, on his advice, turned himself over to the Deputy Commissioner of Police, John Lobo.

== Jury trial ==
The crux of the case was whether Nanavati shot Ahuja in the "heat of the moment" or whether it was a premeditated murder. In the former scenario, Nanavati would have been charged under the Indian penal code for culpable homicide, with a maximum punishment of 10 years. This is because he could have invoked exceptions 1 and 4 of section 300 of IPC (which defines murder). Exception 1 states:

Culpable homicide is not murder if the offender, whilst deprived of the power of self-control by grave and sudden provocation, causes the death of the person who gave the provocation or causes the death of any other person by mistake or accident.

Exception 4 states:

Culpable homicide is not murder if it is committed without premeditation in a sudden fight in the heat of passion upon a sudden quarrel and without the offender having taken undue advantage or acted in a cruel or unusual manner.

Explanation – It is immaterial in such cases which party offers the provocation or commits the first assault.

In the latter scenario (i.e. premeditated murder), Nanavati would be charged with murder, with the sentence being death or life imprisonment. Nanavati pleaded not guilty and his defence team argued it a case of culpable homicide not amounting to murder, while the prosecution argued it was premeditated murder.

The jury in the Greater Bombay sessions court had only one task: to pronounce a person as "Guilty" or "Not Guilty" under the charges. They could not indict any accused nor could punish the accused. The jury in the Greater Bombay sessions court pronounced Nanavati as not guilty under section 302 under which Nanavati was charged, with an 8–1 verdict. Mr. Ratilal Bhaichand Mehta (the sessions judge) considered the acquittal as perverse, and took a historic decision of overturning the jury's decision. He referred the case to the Bombay High Court for a retrial.

The prosecution argued that the jury had been misled by the presiding judge on four crucial points:

1. The onus of proving that it was an accident and not premeditated murder was on Nanavati.
2. Was Sylvia's confession grave provocation for Nanavati, or any specific incident in Ahuja's bedroom or both?
3. The judge wrongly told the jury that the provocation can also come from a third person.
4. The jury was not instructed that Nanavati's defense had to be proved, to the extent that there is no reasonable doubt in the mind of a reasonable person.

The court accepted the arguments, dismissed the jury's verdict and the case was freshly heard in the Bombay High Court. It was claimed that the jury had been influenced by media and was open to being misled.

=== Legacy on Jury Trials in India ===
Due to the popularity of this case, as well as the widespread media coverage it gained, there developed a misconception that this was the last jury trial in India, despite there having been several trials that utilised a jury since. Soon after the case, jury trials in criminal law were phased out in favour of bench trials, and this was officially codified in the Code of Criminal Procedure (enacted in 1973). Exceptions are made in some cases, one of them being for Parsis who still have Jury Trials for their Matrimonial Disputes.

== Retrial ==
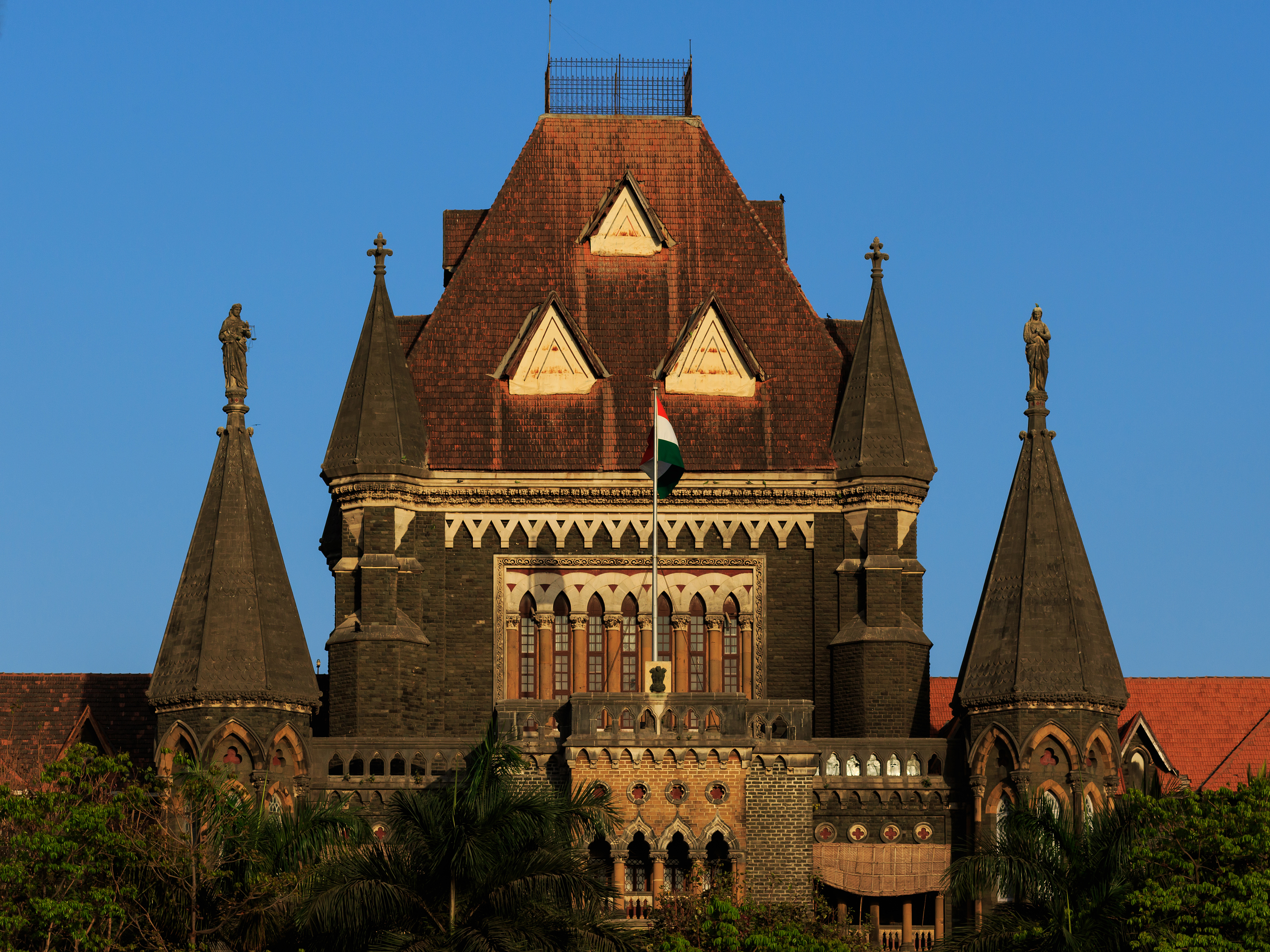
After Nanavati's acquittal by the jury was dismissed, his retrial was held in the Bombay High Court.

=== Defence version ===
In the Bombay High Court, the defence put forth their version of the incident, for which there were no witnesses other than the two men, and no evidence. Hearing Sylvia's confession, an enraged Nanavati wanted to shoot himself, but was calmed down by Sylvia, who told him that he was not to be blamed and there was no reason that he should shoot himself. Since Sylvia did not tell him whether Prem intended to marry her, Nanavati sought to find it out for himself. When Nanavati met Prem at the latter's bedroom, Prem had just come out of the bath dressed only in a white towel; an angry Nanavati swore at Prem and proceeded to ask him if he intended to marry Sylvia and look after his children. Prem replied, "Will I marry every woman I sleep with?", which further enraged Nanavati. Seeing Nanavati go for the gun, enclosed in a brown packet, Prem too went for it and in the ensuing scuffle, Prem's hand caused the gun to go off and instantly kill him.

=== Prosecution version ===
The prosecution's version of the story and their counter-points against the defence's version, was based on replies by witnesses and backed by evidence. The towel that Ahuja was wearing was intact on his body and had neither loosened nor fallen off. In the case of a scuffle, it is highly improbable that the towel would have stayed intact. After Sylvia's confession, a calm and collected Nanavati dropped his family at the movie theatre, drove to his naval base and according to the Navy log, had acquired a gun and rounds, under a false pretext. This indicated that the provocation was neither grave nor sudden and that Nanavati had the murder planned. Ahuja's servant Anjani testified that three shots were fired in quick succession and the entire incident took under a minute to occur, thus ruling out a scuffle. Nanavati walked out of Ahuja's residence, without explaining to his sister Mamie (who was present in another room of the flat) that it was an accident. He then unloaded the gun, went first to the Provost Marshal and then to the police to confess his crime, thus ruling out that he was dazed. The deputy commissioner of police testified that Nanavati confessed that he had shot dead Ahuja and even corrected the misspelling of his name in the police record.

The High Court agreed with the prosecution's argument that the murder was premeditated and sentenced Nanavati to life imprisonment for culpable homicide amounting to murder. On 24 November 1961, the Supreme Court of India upheld the conviction.

== Public support ==
The incident both shocked and riveted the entire country. Such a "crime of passion" was considered unusual. People also found the unfolding relationships intriguing; Nanavati had known Ahuja for nearly 15 years, and Sylvia stood by her husband after Ahuja's murder.

The weekly tabloid Blitz, owned by R. K. Karanjia, a Parsi himself, publicised the story, published exclusive cover stories and openly supported Nanavati. They portrayed him as a wronged husband and upright officer, betrayed by a close friend. Blitz painted Nanavati's image, as that of a man representing the ideal middle class values as against Ahuja's playboy image, that symbolised the corruption and sleaze of the bourgeoisie. Each copy of Blitz during the trial sold for rupees 2, up from the normal rate of 0.25 rupees. Peddlers on the street sold Ahuja Towels and toy Nanavati Revolvers.

Influential Parsis held regular rallies in Bombay, with Karl Jamshed Khandalavala representing Nanavati.

== Release ==
Nanavati had moved in the same social circles as the Nehru-Gandhi family for many years. He had previously worked as Defence Attaché to V. K. Krishna Menon, while the latter was High Commissioner to the United Kingdom, and had grown close to the Nehrus during that time. During the time of Nanavati's trial and sentencing, Jawaharlal Nehru was Prime Minister of India and his sister, Vijaya Lakshmi Pandit, was governor of Bombay state.

All of those advantages may have, in other circumstances, availed Nanavati nothing, for a pardon might have been seen by the press and public at other times as a blatant misuse of power to help the crony of an influential political family. However, public opinion, in the largely conservative country, was decidedly in favour of Nanavati, seen as an upright naval officer with middle-class values and a strong sense of honour. Public opinion held the sentence of life in prison was too harsh and supported a proposal, mooted by the Blitz, to grant a pardon to the naval officer. The Blitz magazine played a significant part in raising public opinion in favour of Nanavati and keeping the issue alive for over three years until the pardon was granted.

Nanavati spent 3 years in prison; it was feared that a pardon for him could elicit an angry reaction from the Sindhi community to which the Ahuja family belonged. At around this time, the government received an application for a pardon from Bhai Pratap, a Sindhi trader who had been a participant in the Indian independence movement, and had been convicted for misusing an import license. Given his freedom fighter background, and the relative insignificance of his offense, the government was inclined to pardon Bhai Pratap. Finally, an application seeking pardon for Nanavati was obtained even from Mamie Ahuja, sister of the deceased. She gave her assent for his pardon in writing. Vijayalakshmi Pandit, then Governor of Maharashtra, pardoned Bhai Pratap and Nanavati on the same day.

After his release, Nanavati, his wife Sylvia and their three children emigrated to Canada and settled in Burlington, Ontario. Nanavati died in Canada on 24 July 2003 of undisclosed reasons. Sylvia moved from their long-time Burlington home to an assisted living flat in 2019.

== In popular culture ==
- Yeh Rastey Hain Pyar Ke, a 1963 suspense thriller starring Sunil Dutt, Leela Naidu and Rehman, was the first Bollywood film which seemed to exploit the case. It flopped at the box office. The film began with a disclaimer that all people and incidents were fictitious, and altered the case's outcome. Leela Naidu's 2010 book with Jerry Pinto indicates that the movie screenplay was written before the Nanavati case. It was a coincidence of the real-life case with a similar storyline that led to similarities while the movie was being made.
- Achanak, a 1973 crime drama, written and directed by Gulzar, starring Vinod Khanna, Lily Chakravarty, and Om Shivpuri, was inspired by the case and was a box-office hit. In the film, Vinod Khanna, who plays an upright army officer, receives a death sentence but its execution remains inconclusive.
- Asthram, a 1983 crime drama, written and directed by P. N. Menon, starring Bharat Gopy and Jyothi was inspired by the case. Author Bibekanada Ray described the film as one of Menon's films "dealing with various contemporary political and social concerns" in her book about India's offbeat cinema.
- Besides a Hindi book titled Nanavati ka Mukadama (Nanavati's trial), Anglo-Indian novelist Indra Sinha's The Death of Mr. Love is a fictional account based on the murder. The book, spanning four decades between the 1950s and 1990s, tells the story of Mrs. S, the second woman besides Sylvia, with whom Prem had a physical relationship. In the title, Love is the literal translation of Prem, Ahuja's first name.
- A fictionalized account of the case also appears in Salman Rushdie's Midnight's Children, where the case of Commander Sabarmati (in the chapter titled "Commander Sabarmati's Baton") is a fictionalised account of the Nanavati case.
- The 2016 Bollywood film Rustom, starring Akshay Kumar, is a fictionalised account of the KM Nanavati case.
- The Pooja Bhatt film Love Affair is also based on this case. It focuses on a lonely foreigner who, stuck in India, falls in love with a man (who isn't her husband) and the consequences of the affair.
- A Marathi play titled Aparadh Meech Kela by playwright Madhusudan Kalelkar is also based on this case. Arun Sarnaik played the character of Cdr. Nanawati in it.
- The 2019 Hindi web series The Verdict - State vs Nanavati by ALTBalaji is based on this case.
- The case was also featured in episode 152 of the true-crime podcast The Desi Crime Podcast, which provides a detailed narration and analysis of the events surrounding it.

== Notes and references ==
- Rustom Movie Based on K.M. Nanavati v. State of Maharashtra Release date: 12 August 2016 (India)
