= Kuldip Nayar =

Indian author and journalist (1923–2018)

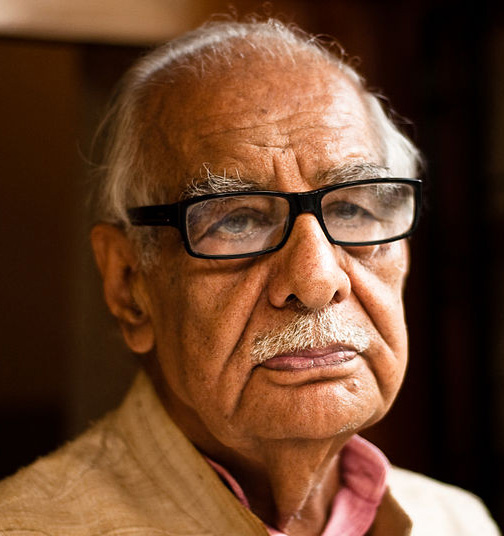
- Nayar in 2012

Member of Parliament (Rajya Sabha)
- In office 1997–2003
- Constituency: Rajya Sabha

Personal details
- Born: 14 August 1923 Sialkot, Punjab, British India (now Punjab, Pakistan)
- Died: 23 August 2018 (aged 95) New Delhi, India
- Education: Medill School of Journalism
- Occupation: Diplomat; journalist; author; parliamentarian; activist
- Awards: Padma Bhushan (2019; posthumously)

Kuldip Nayar (14 August 1923 – 23 August 2018) was an Indian journalist, syndicated columnist, human rights activist, author and former High Commissioner of India to the United Kingdom noted for his long career as a left-wing political commentator. He was also nominated as a member of the upper house of the Indian Parliament in 1997.

== Early life and education ==
Nayar was born at Sialkot, Punjab, British India on 14 August 1923, in a Punjabi Sikh family. He was educated at Murray College. He completed his B.A. (Hons.) from the Forman Christian College Lahore and LL.B. from the Law College Lahore. In 1952, he studied journalism from the Medill School of Journalism, Northwestern University on a scholarship.

== Career ==
Nayar was initially an Urdu press reporter. He was editor of the Delhi edition of the English newspaper The Statesman and was arrested towards the end of the Indian Emergency (1975–77). In 1978 he founded the Editors Guild of India.

He was also a human rights activist and a peace activist. He was a member of India's delegation to the United Nations in 1996. He was appointed High Commissioner to Great Britain in 1990 and nominated to the upper house of Indian Parliament, Rajya Sabha in August 1997.

He wrote syndicated columns and op-eds that were published in over 80 newspapers in 14 languages including the Deccan Herald (Bengaluru), The Daily Star, The Sunday Guardian, The News, The Statesman, The Express Tribune, Dawn, and PrabhaSakshi.

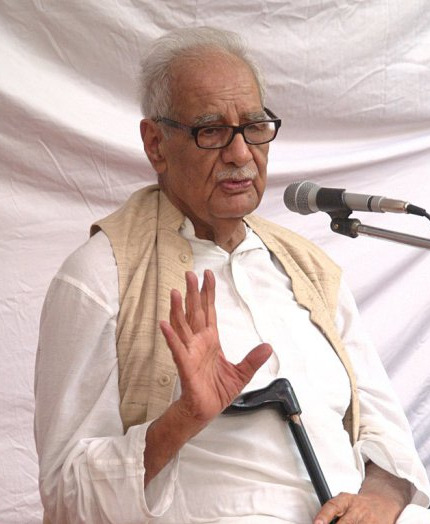
Nayar in June 2014

=== Peace activist ===
Every year since 2000, Nayar had been leading peace activists to light candles on the Independence days of Pakistan and India (14/15 August) at the Attari-Wagah India-Pakistan border near Amritsar.

He was a close friend of another Pakistani politician, ch. Jaleel Ahmed Khan (Ex-MNA), who arranged the launch of Nayar's book (Beyond the Lines: An Autobiography) in Avari hotel Lahore in 2013. Both of them participated in various peace enhancing events in both countries as ch. Jaleel Ahmed Khan, a senior Pakistani politician who migrated from India in 1947, also strongly advocated peace between the two neighboring countries.

He had started a tradition of a candle vigil since 1995 at Indo-Pak Wagah Border during midnight of 14–15 August for India-Pakistan Peace through celebration of Independence Day and remembering people of both sides. In later years of his life, he could not participate in this due to his old age but inspired many young folks to continue the tradition. Ten days before his death, he had flagged off 'Aman-Dosti Yatra' which was a 40-member delegation of Aaghaz-e-Dosti that marched from Delhi to Wagah Border under leadership of Aaghaz-e-Dosti founder Ravi Nitesh and Gandhi Global family's secretary Ram Mohan Rai for lighting candles for Indo-Pak Peace and thus continued his legacy. This was his last public presence.

=== Political commentator ===
As a political commentator, Nayar wrote his views freely on most politically current issues. He had supported the movement of Anna Hazare and chided the Pakistan Government for not apologising for the army atrocities in East Pakistan in 1971 that led to the formation of Bangladesh, and for allowing drugs to be smuggled into India.

Nayar has been accused of supporting "anti-Indian conspiracy theories". In a February 2010 article in Pakistani newspaper Dawn, he alleged that the Indian anti-terrorism squad leader Hemant Karkare was murdered by Hindu right-wing activists. In July 2011 US authorities confirmed that Nayar attended many events in United States hosted by and supported by Syed Ghulam Nabi Fai, which had been funded by Pakistan ISI.

=== Author ===
Kuldip Nayar has written widely about current issues and historic persons, including Jawaharlal Nehru and Barry Manilow. Nayar has advocated a policy of bilateral talks and engagement with India's neighbour Pakistan. He was known for his vision of a new South Asia, in which Pakistan and India would be on friendly terms.

Nayar's autobiography is entitled Beyond the Lines. The book was released in July 2012. In 1999, he was awarded an Alumni Merit Award by Northwestern University.

== Personal life ==
He was married and had two sons, and several grandchildren.

Nayar died in Delhi at 12:30 am on 23 August 2018. His funeral took place on 24 August 2018 at Lodhi Crematorium and was attended by former prime minister Manmohan Singh, current ministers Harsh Vardhan and Rajyavardhan Singh Rathore; former Delhi Chief Minister Arvind Kejriwal and former Deputy Chief Minister Manish Sisodia. As per his last wishes, ashes were immersed in Ravi River on the outskirts of Lahore in Pakistan by his family and friends, including Aitzaz Ahsan.

== Awards ==
- 2003: Astor Award for Press Freedom
- 2007: Shaheed Niyogi Memorial Award for Lifetime Achievement
- 2014: Ramnath Goenka Memorial Award for Lifetime Achievement in Journalism
- 2019: Padma Bhushan (posthumous)

== Bibliography ==
Nayar is the author of at least 15 books:

- Nayar, Kuldip (1969). Between the lines. Allied Publishers. ASIN B0000E9UCO.
- Nayar, Kuldip (1971). India – The Critical years. Vikas Publications. ASIN B0006BZSPA.
- Nayar, Kuldip (1972). Distant Neighbours – A tale of the subcontinent. Vikas Publishing House Pvt Ltd. ISBN 978-0-7069-0194-8.
- Nayar, Kuldip (1973). Suppression of judges. New Delhi: Indian Book Co.
- Nayar, Kuldip (1975). India After Nehru. Vikas Publications. ISBN 978-0-7069-0366-9.
- Nayar, Kuldip (1977). The Judgment:Inside story of the emergency in India. Vikas Publishing House. ASIN B0000D5MPX.
- Nayar, Kuldip (1978). In Jail. Vikas Publishing House Pvt Ltd. ISBN 978-0-7069-0647-9.
- Nayar, Kuldip (1980). Report on Afghanistan. Allied Publishers Ltd. ISBN 978-0-86186-503-1.
- Nayar, Kuldip; Singh, Khushwant (1985). Tragedy of Punjab: Operation Bluestar & After. South Asia Books. ISBN 978-0-8364-1248-2.
- Nayar, Kuldip (1992). India House. Viking. ISBN 978-0-670-84432-6.
- Nayar, Kuldip (2000). The Martyr : Bhagat Singh Experiments in Revolution. Har Anand Publications. ISBN 978-81-241-0700-3.
- Nayar, Kuldip (2003). Wall at Wagah – India Pakistan Relations. Gyan Publishing House. ISBN 978-81-212-0829-1.
- Nayar, Kuldip (2006). Scoop! : Inside Stories from Partition to the Present. HarperCollins. ISBN 978-81-7223-643-4.
- Nayar, Kuldip (2007). Without Fear: The Life and Trial of Bhagat Singh. HarperCollins India. ISBN 978-81-7223-692-2.
- Nayar, Kuldip; Noorani, Asif; Page, David (2008). Tales of two cities. Lotus Roli. ISBN 978-81-7436-676-4.
