= A New Idea of India =

2020 non-fiction book by Harsh Madhusudhan and Rajeev Mantri

- First edition
- Author: Harsh Madhusudan, Rajeev Mantri
- Language: Indian English
- Genre: Non-fiction, narrative
- Publisher: Westland Books
- Publication place: India
- ISBN: 978-93-89648-58-4

A New Idea of India: Individual Rights in a Civilisational State is a 2020 book authored by Harsh Madhusudhan and Rajeev Mantri. Published by Westland Publishers, the book is a narrative focusing on various issues like secularism, capitalism, Indian civilisation, decolonisation, individualism etc.

Its foreword is written by economist Sanjeev Sanyal and it was recommended by the Prime Minister Narendra Modi.

== Reception ==
In November 2020, India's current Prime Minister Narendra Modi took it to Twitter to praise and recommend the book.

Author Gautam Chintamani reviewed the book for The New Indian Express and he wrote that this "book explores the rich past of India and brings the concept of a civilisational republic to the centre of the debate." He added that "articulate India's great traditions via the aspect of individual rights and freedom and add a long overdue and much-needed viewpoint for today's generation."

Another review for the same newspaper was also positive. It was noted that the book is "reference-rich citing multiple authors old and new, though one would have liked the level of discussion seen in the first two chapters maintained throughout. The flow is simple, which means you can finish it in a sitting or two, but commands complete attention."

Sudheendra Kulkarni, writing for The Telegraph, criticised the book’s central idea that the state should recognise everyone as individuals. He wrote, "A strong anti-Muslim, anti-Christian and anti-Congress prejudice prompts the authors — they are admirers of V.D. Savarkar — to make some outlandish accusations." However, he remarked that the authors make "persuasive arguments" when it comes to practising secularism by the Congress and the Left.
