= Sudheendra Kulkarni =

Indian politician and columnist

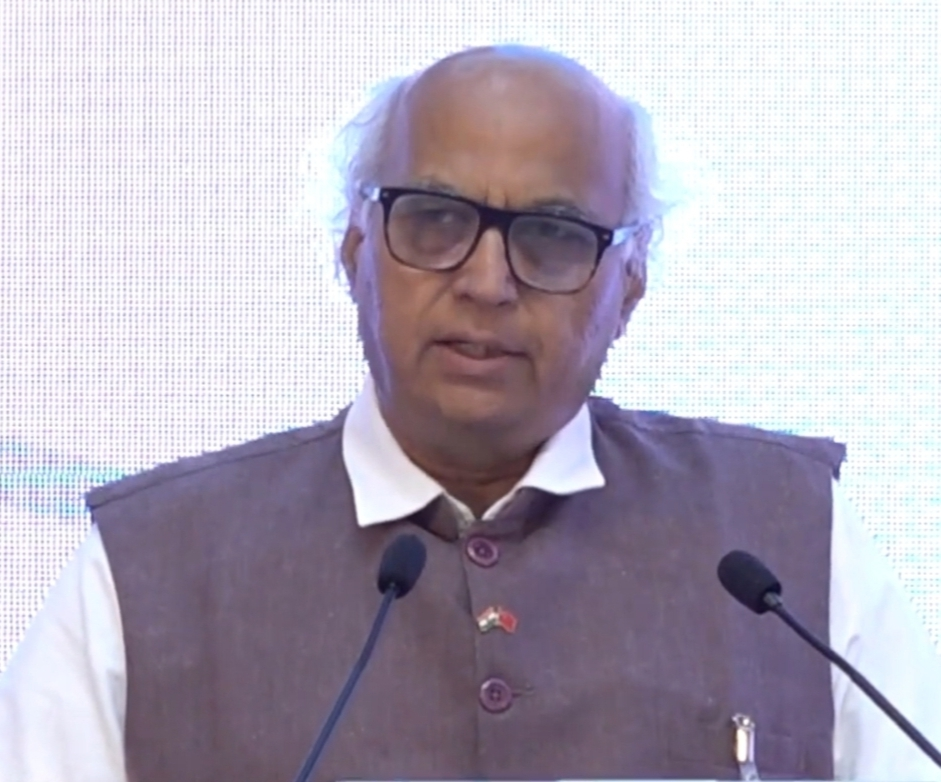
- Kulkarni in 2023

Director of Operations of the Prime Minister's Office
- In office 19 March 1999 – 22 May 2004
- Prime Minister: Atal Bihari Vajpayee

Personal details
- Born: Athani, Karnataka, India
- Party: Bhartiya Janata Party (1996-2009)
- Education: Indian Institute of Technology Bombay
- Profession: Politician; columnist

Sudheendra Kulkarni is an Indian politician and columnist.

== Education ==
Kulkarni was educated at Jadhavji Anandji High School in Athani, a town in Belgaum district, Karnataka, India. He went on to study metallurgical engineering at the Indian Institute of Technology Bombay.

== Stint with BJP ==
A former member of the Communist Party of India (Marxist), Kulkarni joined the Bharatiya Janata Party (BJP) in 1996. Of this ideological switch he said, "People like me were living in an illusory land. I realised very late in my life that the Marxist ideology is not suitable in India - in fact, I would say it is unsuitable for any corner of the world."

As a member of the BJP, he was associated with the India Shining campaign and rode on the inaugural Delhi–Lahore Bus. He helped former Indian Prime Minister Atal Bihari Vajpayee write his speeches and in 2008 was acting as a strategist for Lal Krishna Advani, who had influenced his rise within the party.

Kulkarni resigned from the BJP in 2009. The electoral defeat suffered by the party, led by Advani, had effectively ended his role within the party and he had also become disenchanted with the influence exerted by the right-wing paramilitary Rashtriya Swayamsevak Sangh on party decision-making.

In January 2012, he was reported to be once more working full-time for the BJP, on this occasion as an advisor to its president, Nitin Gadkari. He had been working for Reliance Industries and the Observer Research Foundation, a think tank, prior to this.

== Blitz ==
Kulkarni worked as executive editor for Blitz, a Mumbai-based tabloid format weekly that was edited and owned by Russi Karanjia. According to Kulkarni, Karanjia was sympathetic to the communist movement in India but became disillusioned with it and its anti-Hindu secularism. He became a strong sympathiser of the BJP and the Ayodhya movement, which led to Kulkarni being appointed in place of P. Sainath as deputy editor. Kulkarni was tasked with having Blitz reflect Karanjia's new-found sympathies. Kulkarni then transformed Blitz from a left-wing newspaper into a BJP-oriented publication.

== Hinduja Group ==
Kulkarni joined the Hinduja Group of Companies as Vice President (Media) in the mid-1990s, at a time when the Hinduja Group's chairman was considering tying up with American newspapers to publish an Indian version. It is reported that the Chairman, Srichand Hinduja noticed Sudheendra Kulkarni's Blitz article praising him as a modern-day 'Chanakya' or political diplomat, and arranged to meet him. Later, he joined the Hinduja Group, and wrote many speeches for the Chairman. The newspaper venture of the Hindua Group never took off, and after a few years of professional wilderness with the Hindujas, Kulkarni resigned to join the BJP.

== Cash-for-votes scandal ==
In 2008, a sting operation was carried out that involved Kulkarni and another BJP activist. Later televised and known as the "cash-for-votes scandal", the operation purported to show a bribe of 10 million rupees being offered to three BJP MPs on behalf of the Indian National Congress-led United Progressive Alliance government. The alleged bribes were intended to obtain the support of the MPs in the 2008 Lok Sabha Vote of Confidence. Subsequently, both the Kishore Chandra Deo committee — a parliamentary panel — and the police investigated the arrangements and questioned various participants, including Kulkarni. In 2011, Kulkarni was remanded in judicial custody for a period over the cash-for-votes scandlal and in November of that year was released on bail.

== Attacked by the Shiv Sena ==
On 12 October 2015, Kulkarni was attacked by Shiv Sena activists for organising a book launch for former Pakistan foreign minister Khurshid Mahmud Kasuri. The Sena alleged that Kulkarni had disrespected Indian soldiers by sharing a stage with Kasuri, and his attackers blackened his face and clothes with black paint. Following the attack, Kulkarni continued with the book launch with his blackened face and clothes.

== Support for Rahul Gandhi ==
In the run-up to the 2019 elections, Sudheendra Kulkarni switched sides again, and started openly supporting the Congress President Rahul Gandhi as the best candidate for the country's Prime Minister. Citing many problems India faced such as China and Pakistan, he said that Rahul Gandhi, whom he described as a 'leader with a good heart' would become an ideal Prime Minister of India, and openly opposed Prime Minister Narendra Modi.
