= Meenakshi Reddy Madhavan =

Indian blogger and writer

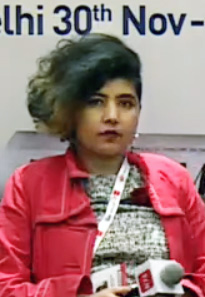
- Meenakshi Reddy Madhavan, Times Lit Fest, 2019
- Born: Kerala, India
- Occupations: Blogger, writer
- Parents: N. S. Madhavan (father); Sheela Reddy (mother)

Meenakshi Reddy Madhavan is an Indian blogger and writer who writes under the pseudonym eM on The Compulsive Confessor. Her first book, a semi-autobiographical book is You Are Here, was published by Penguin.

She is the daughter of the Malayalam writer and former Indian Administrative Service officer N. S. Madhavan. Her mother Sheela Reddy is a journalist, a former editor of Indian magazine Outlook and author of Mr. and Mrs. Jinnah: The Marriage.

== Bibliography ==
- The One Who Had Two Lives (Girls of the Mahabharata #2) (2019)
- The One Who Swam with the Fishes (Girls of the Mahabharata #1) (2017)
- Before, And Then After (2015)
- Split (2015)
- Cold Feet (2012)
- The Life & Times of Layla The Ordinary (2010)
- You are Here (2008)
