= Trikal =

1985 film by Shyam Benegal

- Trikal (Past, Present, Future)
- Directed by: Shyam Benegal
- Written by: Shyam Benegal (Story & Screenplay); Shama Zaidi (Dialogue)
- Produced by: Freni M Variava
- Starring: Leela Naidu; Anita Kanwar; Neena Gupta; Soni Razdan; Dalip Tahil; Naseeruddin Shah; Lucky Ali
- Cinematography: Ashok Mehta
- Edited by: Bhanudas Divakar
- Music by: Vanraj Bhatia
- Release date: 30 August 1985
- Running time: 137 min
- Languages: Hindi, Konkani, Portuguese

Trikal (Past, Present and Future) is a 1985 Indian movie written and directed by Shyam Benegal, set in Goa during the twilight of Portuguese rule, It marked the return of Leela Naidu in her first film appearance since 1969.

The film was selected for the Indian Panorama at Filmotsav 1986, and for the Indian Film Retrospective, Lisbon 1986. It was later invited to the London Film Festival 1986.

== Plot summary ==
Set in Portuguese Goa in 1961, shortly before the colony's liberation by the Indian army and shown in the form of flashbacks, Anna Souza-Suarez is unwillingly engaged to a young man named Erasmo when her grandfather Ernesto suddenly dies. The engagement is put on hold indefinitely as Anna's grief-stricken grandmother, Dona Maria, the matriarch of the family, attempts to hold seances to contact Ernesto with the help of her maid Milagrinia, acting as a medium. However, the seances bring forth the apparitions of various people the family has wronged in the past. Shortly after a visitation by the spirit of an Indian rebel beheaded by Dona Maria's grandfather in a case of mistaken identity. Leon, Anna's lover, a fugitive is hidden in the cellar of the family home. Anna soon discovers that she is pregnant with Leon's child and unsuccessfully tries to hide that she had an affair from Erasmo. Ruiz, who had attempted to pursue Anna in the past, begins a secret relationship with Milagrinia, who becomes pregnant as well. Anna elopes with Leon to Europe leaving only a letter behind. Milagrinia also marries an older man in an attempt to make sure the child isn't born out of wedlock. After twenty-four years, Ruiz returns to his ancestral home which is now in ruins from years of neglect and ponders his reasons for returning.

The movie ends with Naseeruddin Shah's monologue which actually questions the actions of characters within the movie, including his. He wonders what brought him back after so many years. Everything fades under layers of time and all that remains is sweet memory.

== Cast ==
- Leela Naidu as Dona Maria Souza-Soares
- Naseeruddin Shah as Ruiz Pereira
  - Nikhil Bhagat as Young Ruiz Pereira
- Anita Kanwar as Sylvia
- Neena Gupta as Milagrenia
- Soni Razdan as Aurora: Sylvia's elder daughter
- Dalip Tahil as Leon Gonsalves
- K. K. Raina as Senor Lucio
- Kunal Kapoor as Kapitan Ribeiro/ Governor
- Keith Stevenson as Dr. Simon Pereira
- Lucky Ali as Erasmo
- Salim Ghouse as main priest at Church
- Ila Arun as Cook
- Jayant Kripalani as Francis
- Akash Khurana as Renato
- Sabira Merchant as Dona Amelia
- Sushma Prakash as Anna: younger daughter of Sylvia
- Remo Fernandes as Singer
- Alisha Chinai as Singer
- Kulbhushan Kharbanda as Vijay Singh Rane/Khushtoba Rane
- Dhruv Ghanekar as young son of Sylvia
- Joy Ghanekar as youngest son of Sylvia

== Awards ==
- 1986: National Film Award for Best Direction: Shyam Benegal
- 1986: National Film Award for Best Costume Design: Saba Zaidi
