= Yeh Rastey Hain Pyar Ke =

- Poster
- Directed by: R. K. Nayyar
- Starring: Sunil Dutt; Leela Naidu; Ashok Kumar
- Music by: Ravi
- Release date: 1963
- Country: India
- Language: Hindi

Yeh Rastey Hain Pyar Ke (lit. 'These are the paths of love') is a 1963 Hindi crime drama film starring Sunil Dutt and Leela Naidu in the lead roles. This film was Sunil Dutt's debut production, directed by R.K. Nayyar, with music composed by Ravi. Dutt's favourite writer Aghajani Kashmiri scripted Yeh Rastey.. which is based on the sensational K.M. Nanavati adultery and murder case in Mumbai. The film was said to be a thinly-disguised version of the famous Nanavati case where an upright naval captain, Capt. Nanavati, shot dead the lover of his wife. The film was said to be ahead of its times and too bold but did well at the box office.

The 1973 film Achanak is also based on the same case. The Akshay Kumar-starrer 2016 film Rustom is based on the same case as well.

== Plot ==
Anil Sahni is an airforce pilot who married Neena against his father's wishes. When Anil was away on a trip, Neena and Ashok become close and have an affair. Anil returns and is furious to find out about the affair. He confronts Ashok, who is killed in an ensuing scuffle. Anil is tried for murder in court, with defence and prosecution lawyers fighting it out.

== Cast ==
- Ashok Kumar as Advocate Byomkesh Mukherjee
- Sunil Dutt as Anil Sahni
- Leela Naidu as Neena Sahni
- Motilal as Prosecutor Ali Khan
- Rehman as Ashok Shrivastav
- Shashikala as Asha
- Rajendra Nath as Kewal Kapoor
- Hari Shivdasani as Rai Bahadur Gyanchand Sahni
- Iftekhar as Junior Lawyer

== Soundtrack ==
Ravi has composed the music of the film and lyrics were penned by Rajinder Krishan.

Song	Singer
"Koi Mujhse Poochhe"	Mohammed Rafi
"Tum Jis Pe Nazar Dalo"	Mohammed Rafi
"Yeh Khamoshiyan, Yeh Tanhaiyan"	Mohammed Rafi, Asha Bhosle
"Yeh Raste Hain Pyar Ke"	Asha Bhosle
"Jaan-E-Jaan Paas Aao"	Asha Bhosle
"Aaj Yeh Meri Zindagi"	Asha Bhosle
"Rooh Khatm Ho Gayi"	Asha Bhosle
