= Cash-for-votes scandal =

2008 North Indian political scandal

The cash-for-votes scandal was an Indian political scandal allegedly masterminded by then Bharatiya Janata Party politician Sudheendra Kulkarni in which the United Progressive Alliance, the majority-holding parliamentary-party alliance of India led by Sonia Gandhi, allegedly bribed Bhartiya Janta Party MPs in order to survive a confidence vote on 22 July 2008. The vote in the Lok Sabha arose after the Communist Party of India (Marxist)-led Left Front withdrew support from the government, who wanted to pursue an Indo-US nuclear deal.

== Events and allegations ==
In 2008, the Section 123 Agreement signed between the United States of America and the Republic of India is known as the U.S.–India Civil Nuclear Agreement or Indo-US nuclear deal. The framework for this agreement was on 18 July 2005, joint statement by then Indian Prime Minister Dr. Manmohan Singh and then U.S. President George W. Bush, under which India agreed to separate its civil and military nuclear facilities and to place all its civil nuclear facilities under International Atomic Energy Agency (IAEA) safeguards and, in exchange, the United States agreed to work toward full civil nuclear cooperation with India.

The Communist Party of India (Marxist) that was supporting the Dr Manmohan Singh government, objected to the agreement citing reasons that proposal would see the United States supply nuclear technology to India in return for India agreeing to United Nations inspections of its nuclear programs and the splitting of the civil and military aspects of those programs. CPI(M) believed that this would cause India to be effectively subservient to the US. The Bharatiya Janata Party (BJP) also objected, on the grounds that the inspections could impede development of the country's nuclear arms program.

It had been argued by Dr. Manmohan Singh and his party that the nuclear infrastructure needed to be developed more rapidly because the existing electric generation facilities were incapable of meeting growing demand.

The United Progressive Alliance (UPA), the governing alliance in India elected in 2004, faced its first confidence vote in the Lok Sabha (the lower house of Parliament) on 22 July 2008 after the Communist Party of India (Marxist)-led Left Front withdrew support over India approaching the IAEA for the Indo-US nuclear deal. The vote was so crucial that the UPA and the opposition parties summoned MPs from their sick beds and even from prison cells to take part in the vote, which was eventually won by the Government.

The government's success in the 2008 confidence vote was marred when three BJP MPs, including Ashok Argal, waved bundles of cash which they produced from bags in parliament during the debate, accusing the government of giving it to them in order to buy their support or abstention in the vote. The BJP demanded the resignation of Prime Minister Manmohan Singh over the allegations and claimed that they had video evidence of the deals being made, while the CPI(M) leader said that "Practically every member of parliament has been approached with offers of money and inducements." The government denied the allegations, pointing out that Argal would have self-incriminated himself by admitting to receiving a bribe. The Speaker, Somnath Chatterjee, asked New Delhi's police chief to investigate.

A fortnight later, on 2 August, the BJP offered "documentary evidence" to support its allegation that Argal, Faggan Singh Kulaste and Mahaveer Bhagora had been bribed. The evidence included transcripts of video recordings and explanatory letters from two of the MPs, all of which was passed to the investigatory committee that had been set up by parliament. The BJP also criticised CNN-IBN, who had recorded the BJP MP's attempt to sting the government but had not broadcast it.

The tapes were broadcast on 12 August 2008 after CNN-IBN had made its appearance before the investigating committee. The company had resisted the calls for an earlier broadcast on the grounds of legal opinion that it had not yet attended the committee and that the broadcast might prejudice the investigatory process.

The parliamentary investigation began on 30 July 2008 and has frequently been referred to as the Kishore Chandra Deo committee. The committee reported in December 2008 that it had found no evidence of bribery in the case of Rajya Sabha members Amar Singh and Ahmad Patel. They had been accused of offering the bribes, and Singh was a prominent member of the Samajwadi Party (SP) which had begun to support the government at the time when the Left Front moved to oppose it. The committee also recommended further investigation into the activities of Sanjeev Saxena, Sohail Hindustani and Sudheendra Kulkarni. Saxena was an aide to Amar Singh, Kulkarni had a similar role for the BJP leader, L. K. Advani and Hindustani was a Bharatiya Janata Yuva Morcha activist (although some early reports say that he was a driver). Some committee members distanced themselves from the report's full conclusions but agreed that the additional investigation was needed. The report concluded that the video evidence relating to a car at Singh's house was insufficient proof: it was not possible to determine who was in the car and "It does not prove what transpired inside the house. There is nothing to show that money was offered for voting in favour of the motion of confidence or for abstaining from voting."

A police investigation was instigated in January 2009 to look into the issues relating to Saxena, Hindustani and Kulkarni which had been recommended in the report of the parliamentary committee.

In his autobiography Drohkaal ka Pathik, released in November 2013, former MP Pappu Yadav alleged that during the July 2008 trust vote, both the Congress and BJP had offered "Rs 40 crore each" to MPs of his Indian Federal Democratic Party, for their support.

== Reports of evidence ==
=== Leaked diplomatic cables ===
The Congress Party had worked to support the government in the vote and on 17 March 2011 leaked diplomatic cables claimed that Nachiketa Kapur, a Congress Party political aide, had boasted to US Embassy officials in July 2008 that his party had funds to bribe MPs in order to obtain a favourable outcome. Kapur claimed that four MPs who were members of Rashtriya Lok Dal (RLD) had already been paid off. The Hindu reported that

Five days before the Manmohan Singh government faced a crucial vote of confidence on the Indo-U.S. nuclear deal in 2008, a political aide to Congress leader Satish Sharma showed a U.S. Embassy employee "two suitcases containing cash" he said was part of a bigger fund of Rs. 500 million ($13 million) to Rs. 600 million ($15 million) that the party had assembled to purchase the support of MPs."

Former United States Ambassador to India David Campbell Mulford commented that US diplomatic cables were "generally accurate" but that all he could recall of the incident was that someone "turned out with a suitcase of money and dumped it on the table... That was clear theatrics." In denying any wrongdoing, the RLD pointed out that they only had three MPs at the time, not four as stated in the leaked cable. Satish Sharma, who was the person for whom Kapur acted as an aide according to the cable, said that he had no aide at all.

The revelations led immediately to further calls for the resignation of Manmohan Singh and also for an investigation of the activities of Kapur and Sharma. There were also calls for the issue of a First Information Report (FIR), which is the formal means by which the police record their notification of an offence.

It was announced on the following day, 18 March, that the police investigation into the original allegations was near to completion.

=== Tehelka exposé ===
Tehelka, a sometimes controversial publication that specialises in exposés, reported that the entire affair was a BJP set-up designed to entrap members of the government. The report was based on an account given by Siddharth Gautam, a CNN-IBN reporter who had been involved, and on some recordings of telephone conversations that had not previously been made available.

== Supreme Court involvement ==
An application was made to the Supreme Court on 2 April requesting that it ordered a Special Investigation Team to probe the affair. The applicants were a group calling themselves the India Rejuvenation Initiative and they argued that the investigatory process had stalled since the report of the parliamentary committee. The hearing was adjourned to due a procedural irregularity in the application, and when this was resolved on 2 May the Court issued notices to the Delhi police and government that required them to provide information regarding the current status of the investigation. The petitioners said that

The cash-for-vote incident showed the desperate depths to which certain political functionaries and parties stooped to ensure victory on the floor of the House, and these exposures represent both a gross moral degeneration and crass political opportunism of the government and had degraded and disgraced our sacrosanct traditions of parliamentary democracy,

On 7 July the Court voiced its frustration with the continued absence of the requested status reports and set a filing deadline of 15 July. The police had requested a further two months to fulfil the request. Upon being presented with the status report, the Court criticised the lethargy of the police investigation, complaining that little had been done and that which had been done was poorly documented, inconsistent and in places factually incorrect.

The court was similarly disparaging of a second report which followed on from a burst of activity by the police. On 5 August 2011, Justice Loda said

What are you doing regarding these inferences? It is distressing that middlemen of the cheapest kind tried to manipulate Parliament proceedings. To some extent, they have succeeded. You must find out what is the source of the money. You failed to achieve anything substantial in the case for two years and got activated only after the apex court orders.

== Arrests ==
Sudheendra Kulkarni
In September 2011, a former aide of India's top opposition leader LK Advani, Sudheendra Kulkarni, has been arrested in connection with an alleged cash-for-votes scandal. Kulkarni is alleged to have "master-minded" the operation. He says it was to expose corruption in the government. Kulkarni was an aide to senior Bharatiya Janata Party (BJP) leader LK Advani at the time of the vote. He told the court that he was "a whistleblower" who intended to expose corruption. Police allege that Kulkarni approached Amar Singh's Samajwadi Party - an ally of the Congress-led government at the time of the vote - to offer bribe to BJP MPs. He then got a television channel to secretly film the alleged bribe giving in order to nail the government, police allege.

Sanjeev Saxena
Sanjeev Saxena, alleged to be an aide of the then Samajwadi Party general secretary Amar Singh was arrested on 17 July, two days after the police had been criticised by the Court. The police claimed to have sufficient evidence to prove that he had delivered money to the three BJP MPs and alleged that he had misled both their inquiry and that of parliament. They also announced that they had interviewed Bhahora and Kulaste, who were no longer MPs, but that their ability to interview Argal was hampered because he was still in office. They had applied to the Home Ministry for permission to interview him and Amar Singh, still a member of the Rajya Sabha, and further announced that they intended to re-interview Hindustani. The developments caused Deo to clarify that his committee had not absolved Singh of any involvement but rather that it had found no evidence to confirm involvement. He also had to explain that the decision not to interview Singh had been because the committee had no prima facie evidence of Singh's involvement, the summonsing process for a Rajya Sabha member would have been complex, and the outcome may have still been a failure to attend as Singh was not obliged to do so. Furthermore, he stated, the dissenting members of the committee had agreed with its conclusions but had disagreed with his chairmanship. Deo had become a cabinet minister on 12 July.

Sohail Hindustani
Delhi Police arrested Sohail Hindustani, a Bharatiya Janata Yuva Morcha activist was arrested on 20 July and announced that he would be repeating his previous statements that he had been approached by Singh and some members of the Congress Party who had wanted him to "arrange" BJP votes. The police described him as the "orchestrator" and explained that he was working for the BJP in an attempt to entrap the government, but his defence counsel has claimed that he was just a "whistleblower" and that as such he should not have been the primary focus of police attention. The BJP took a similar line to defence counsel, claiming that the investigation was an "eyewash", querying how police lethargy had turned so quickly and suggesting that they were being put under pressure by the government.

Amar Singh
Amar Singh was interviewed on 22 July and on the same day the police announced that they wished to speak with SP MP Rewati Raman Singh, whom the BJP MPs alleged had approached them on behalf of Amar Singh. On the same day, the Court ordered that Hindustani and Saxena should be detained in custody for 14 days, despite defence arguments of police misconduct. The defence claimed that the police had not interviewed Hindustani and therefore had no new evidence upon which to base their recent claims of orchestration. When the police stated that interviews had taken place the defence counsel responded by noting that they had not been present for any such interviews and that their presence was a legal requirement. The detentions were subsequently extended to 18 August.
Despite Amar Singh having previously fallen out with his party's leadership and being expelled from the party, Mulayam Singh, the leader of the SP, voiced his support for the ex-member on 24 July and claimed that Amar Singh had been framed. Rewati Raman Singh and Argal were interviewed by police on the following day, with Singh claiming that he gave them the same details as he had previously given to the investigatory committee, and Argal claiming that in fact Singh had approached him in relation to facilitating the alleged bribe. Kulkarni was interviewed on 14 July.
Amar Singh was arrested on 6 September for his alleged involvement in the scam and was ordered to be remanded in custody until 19 September. He had appealed to the court to exempt him from appearing personally, stating that he was ill with an infection; however, his request was rejected.

On 22 November 2013, a Delhi court accepted the statements of Amar Singh and three BJP men - Faggan Singh Kulaste, Ashok Argal and Mahabir Singh Bhagora - that their actions had been as whistleblowers. Saxena still stands trial under the Prevention of Corruption Act.

== See also ==
- List of scandals in India
- Corruption in India
- 2011 Indian anti-corruption movement
- 2015 Cash For Vote Scam
- Cash-for-questions affair
- 2009 cash for influence scandal
