= Kaya Taran =

2004 Indian Hindi film

- Directed by: Sashi Kumar
- Screenplay by: Sashi Kumar
- Story by: N.S. Madhavan
- Produced by: Sashi Kumar
- Starring: Angad Bedi; Seema Biswas; Neelambari Bhattacharya; Neeta Mohindra
- Cinematography: Ashwini Kaul
- Edited by: A. Sreekar Prasad
- Music by: Isaac Thomas Kottukapally
- Release date: 4 December 2004
- Running time: 107 minutes
- Country: India
- Language: Hindi

Kaya Taran (English title: Chrysalis) is a 2004 Indian Hindi-language film directed by Sashi Kumar with Angad Bedi, Seema Biswas, Neelambari Bhattacharya and Neeta Mohindra in the lead roles.

The film, based on the Malayalam short story When Big Tree Falls by N. S. Madhavan, is set against the backdrop of 2002 Gujarat riots against Muslims and 1984 anti-Sikh riots.

The film won the Aravindan Puraskaram, given to the best debut film-maker, for 2004, for its "deft handling of a theme of contemporary relevance through sensitive imageries, carefully orchestrated sound design and finely etched characters."

Two prominent journalists who covered the '84 riots, Rahul Bedi and Joseph Maliakan, played themselves in the film. Well-known dancer and choreographer Chandralekha choreographed a dance-sequence in the film performed among others by the noted Bharatanatyam dancer Navtej Johar.

== Plot ==
Preet is a shy young journalist visiting a convent for aged nuns in Meerut to write a story about conversions. His meeting with Sister Agatha, a Malayalee nun who manages the convent, rekindles the memories of an incident that took place in the convent way back in 1984, taking the narrative in the flashback. A young Sikh woman, Amarjeet Kaur, along with her 8-year-old son Jaggi, escaping from marauding rioters, seeks refuge in the convent. The nuns give them a place to hide, making the mother wear nun's robes and cutting the boy's long hair to conceal their identities. The young boy gradually settles in and becomes part of the convent life, giving the nuns something to look forward to in their staid daily routine. The nuns refuse to give in to constant threats from the pursuers plotting Amarjeet's and Jaggi's escape. The plot moves to and for in time to reveal how Preet makes peace with his troubled past while reclaiming the outward symbol of his identity. The film concludes by showing Preet wearing a turban.

== Cast ==
- Seema Biswas as Sister Agatha
- Angad Bedi as Preet
- Neelambari Bhattacharya as Jaggi
- Neeta Mohindra as Amarjeet, Jaggi's mother
- Soman Nambiar as Father Thomas
- Bhanu Rao
- Vani Subbanna
- Poonam Vasudev
- Joy Michael
- Lakshmi Fenn
- Rhava
- Stephanie Pollock
- Kalindhi Deshpande
- Kitty Menon

== Reception ==
Praising Sashi Kumar's subtle handling, Soumya Menon wrote in India Times, "Instead of the high-pitched Hindu-Muslim divide, he decided to stage the dilemmas of conversion on the reverberations that followed in the wake of massacre of the Sikh community. Nor did he draw on the horror and gore of the riots or the Khalistan movement to add spice. Sashi instead introspects into the epistemology of communal conversions and questions the relevance of the very religious identity that sparks such anger and outrage."

Nirupama Dutt writing in The Tribune called it "poetic translation on celluloid of N.S. Madhavan’s story."

"The techno-magical potential of cinema gets full play in Kaya Taran," wrote Sadanand Menon reviewing the film in The Hindu, while praising it for striking "a fine balance between menace and tenderness".

Amit Sengupta writing in Tehelka called it a "surrealist film" praising "nuanced performance" by Seema Biswas, Angad Bedi, Neelambari Bhattacharya and the women in the old women’s home. "Even those who are speechless, excel in their silence," he wrote.
