= Leela Naidu =

Indian actress in Hindi and English films

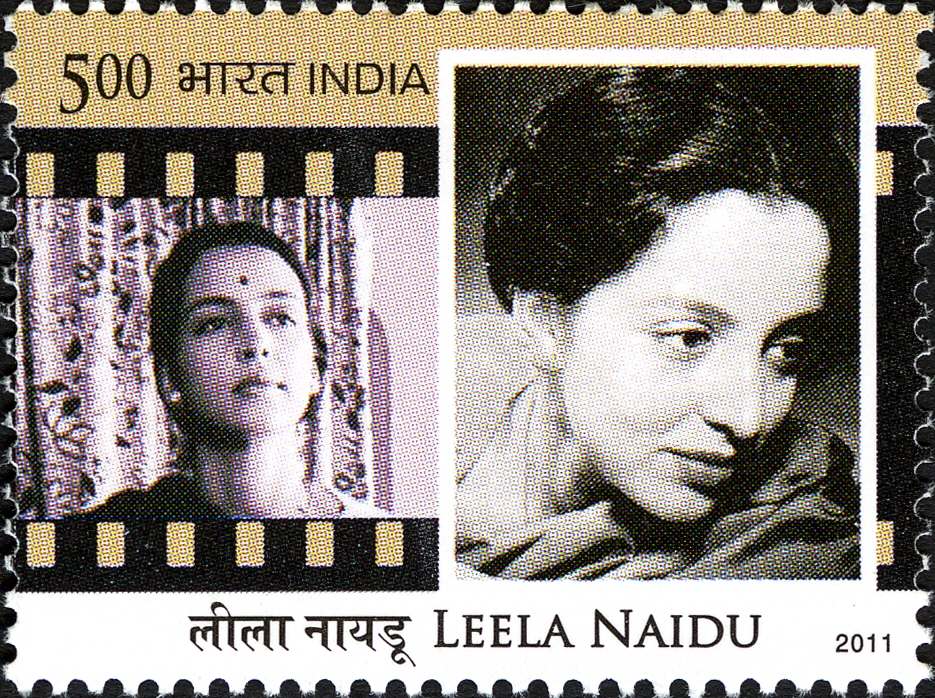
- Naidu on a 2011 India Post stamp
- Born: 1940; Bombay, British India
- Died: 28 July 2009 (aged 69); Mumbai, Maharashtra, India
- Occupations: Actor, Model
- Years active: 1960–1992
- Spouses: Tilak Raj Oberoi (m. 1956, divorced); Dom Moraes (m. 1969, separated)
- Father: Pattipati Ramaiah Naidu
- Awards: Femina Miss India

Leela Naidu (1940 – 28 July 2009) was an Indian actress who starred in a small number of Hindi and English films, including Yeh Raste Hain Pyar Ke (1963), based on the real-life Nanavati case, and The Householder, Merchant Ivory Productions' first film. She was Femina Miss India in 1954, and was featured in the Vogue along with Maharani Gayatri Devi in the list of "World's Ten Most Beautiful Women", a list she was continuously listed in from the 1950s to the 1960s in prominent fashion magazines worldwide.

== Early life ==
Leela Naidu was born in Bombay (now Mumbai), India. Her father, Dr. Pattipati Ramaiah Naidu, a well known nuclear physicist, hailed from Madanapalle, Chittoor District, Andhra Pradesh, and had worked under the supervision of Nobel Laureate Marie Curie for his doctoral thesis in Paris. He ran one of Madame Curie's labs in Paris. Her mother, journalist and Indologist, Dr. Marthe Mange Naidu, was of Swiss-French origin, from Pont d'Avignon, South-France and earned her PhD from the Sorbonne. Naidu was the only surviving child out of eight pregnancies as Marthe had seven miscarriages.

She grew up in Europe, went to school in Geneva, Switzerland, and in her teens, took acting lessons from Jean Renoir.

Leela met Salvador Dalí in Grand-hotel Opera, Paris where she posed for a painting of the Madonna.

== Career ==
Leela Naidu was crowned Femina Miss India in 1954, and the same year was featured in Vogue magazine's list of the world's ten most beautiful women.

=== Film career ===
Naidu made her film debut alongside Balraj Sahni in Anuradha (1962), directed by Hrishikesh Mukherjee. Mukherjee cast Naidu in the role after he happened to see one of her pictures taken by Kamaladevi Chattopadhyay. Though it was not successful at the box office, it went on to win the National Film Award for Best Feature Film, and garnered Naidu critical acclaim, including its songs, "Haye Re Woh Din Kewn Na Aaye", "Jaane Kaise Sapnon Mein Kho Gayin Ankhiyan" and "Kaise Din Beete Kaisi Beeti Raatein", were composed by sitar maestro Ravi Shankar. Naidu's next film was Nitin Bose's Umeed (1962), alongside Ashok Kumar and Joy Mukherjee.

She played an offbeat role as an adulterous wife in Yeh Rastey Hain Pyar Ke (1963), directed by R.K. Nayyar, co-starring Sunil Dutt and Rehman, was based on the real life case K. M. Nanavati vs. State of Maharashtra. The film did well at the box office and some of its songs, notably "Ye Khaamoshiyaan, Ye Tanahaaiyaan", became quite popular.

In 1963, Naidu played the lead role of a rebellious young bride in the first Merchant Ivory film The Householder, directed by James Ivory. According to Leela in her 2009 semi-biography, Ivory and Ismail Merchant had approached her about making their first ever feature movie with a story about an archaeologist, but this fell through as the backers did not like the film script. She then suggested to Merchant-Ivory, making a movie about a book called The Householder by Ruth Prawer Jhabvala, which led to their introduction to Ruth and a fruitful lifelong partnership. Satyajit Ray lent his crew, got many of the actors he used in his movies to act in this movie, selected the music and musicians, re-cut and reedited the final version, thus guiding and teaching Merchant-Ivory in movie making technique which they successfully used in their award-winning movies and documentaries in the future.

After watching her performance in the film, Satyajit Ray planned an English film, The Journey, with Marlon Brando, Shashi Kapoor and Naidu, but the film was never made. She was considered for the role of Rosie in Vijay Anand's Guide (1965), but the role required a trained dancer, and so Naidu lost out to Waheeda Rehman. Her last film in Hindi mainstream cinema was Baghi (1964), a costume extravaganza co-starring Pradeep Kumar, Vijaya Choudhury and Mumtaz.

Later, Naidu made a guest appearance in the Merchant-Ivory film, The Guru (1969). She returned to cinema in 1985 to play a Goan matriarch in Shyam Benegal's period film Trikaal. Her appearance in Electric Moon (1992), directed by Pradip Krishen, turned out to be her last cinematic role.

She turned down Raj Kapoor four times when he approached her for casting her in his films. David Lean wanted to cast her as Tonya in Dr. Zhivago, Satyajit Ray wanted to make a film with her and Marlon Brando.

Leela Naidu produced a documentary on mentally challenged children A Certain Childhood, which was Kumar Shahni's first directorial project under the banner of Leela Naidu Films. Later, she registered under Unicorn Films to make another film Houseless Bombay, but it was never made. She briefly held a job as an editor at the Bombay-based magazine Key Notes.

In September 2009, Lila, a documentary on Leela Naidu's life, by Bidisha Roy Das and Priyanjana Dutta was released.

== Personal life ==
In 1956, at the age of 17, she married Tilak Raj Oberoi, son of Mohan Singh Oberoi, the founder of the luxury Oberoi Hotels chain. Tilak Raj, known as "Tikki", was 33 years old at the time. Naidu and Oberoi had twin daughters, Maya and Priya. The brief marriage ended in divorce, and Oberoi won custody of the girls. Subsequently, Naidu met philosopher Jiddu Krishnamurti while in London, and was deeply attracted to his teachings. In 1969, she was married for the second time, to Mumbai poet Dom Moraes. They lived in Hong Kong, New York City, New Delhi, and Mumbai for about 25 years. After the relationship ended, Naidu led a somewhat reclusive life in Colaba, Mumbai.

== Death ==
Leela Naidu's separation from her second husband Moraes caused her to retire from public life. She lived alone, in an elegant and large old flat bequeathed to her father by the Tatas, at Sargent House, in old Bombay the by-lane of the Colaba Causeway, Mumbai. Naidu spent most of her last decade indoors but had a steady roster of visitors as she was an excellent conversationalist. She would call her friends and keep in touch with both her daughters and grandsons. Her daughter Priya died of a heart attack on 8 February 2008.

Leela Naidu died in Mumbai on 28 July 2009, due to lung failure after a prolonged bout of influenza, at the age of 69. Her funeral was held on 29 July in Chandanwadi Crematorium attended by her daughter Maya, grandchildren and friends.

== Books ==
- Leela: A Patchwork Life co-authored with Jerry Pinto. Penguin Group, 2009.

== Filmography ==
=== Films ===
- Anuradha (1962), aka Love of Anuradha (International: English title) .... Anuradha Roy
- Umeed (1962)
- Yeh Raste Hain Pyar Ke (1963) .... Neena
- The Householder (1963), aka Gharbar .... Indu
- Baghi (1964)
- Aabroo (1968) .... Sharda
- The Guru (1969) .... Girl at the Party
- Trikaal (Past, Present and Future) (1985) .... Dona Maria Souzasoares
- Electric Moon (1992) .... Socks

=== Television ===
- Man of the World .... Dr. Bahandi (1 episode – "The Frontier", 1962)
- Channing The Face in the Sun (1 episode – "The Young and the Bold", 1964) .... Anna
