= Pattipati Ramaiah Naidu =

Indian physicist (1904–1991)

- Born: 3 June 1904; Madanapalle, British India
- Died: 6 June 1991 (aged 87)
- Education: Benaras Hindu University, University of Paris, London University
- Spouse: Martha Manges
- Children: Leela Naidu
- Scientific career
- Fields: Physics, chemistry, nuclear physics, radiology, experimental physics
- Workplaces: Radium Institute, University of Paris, London University, Memorial Sloan–Kettering Cancer Center, Tata Memorial Centre, UNESCO

Pattipati Ramaiah Naidu (a.k.a. Dr. Ramaiah Naidu) (June 3, 1904 – June 6, 1991) was a pioneering Indian nuclear Physicist, Medical Scientist and Radiologist who helped to establish the foundations of medical physics, which is why he is also known as the “Father of Medical Physics”. He is better known for working under double Nobel Laureate, Marie Curie, for his post-doctoral thesis in Paris, France and pioneer in establishing up Radiology laboratory in India in 1938.

== Early life ==
Naidu was born at Madanapalli, British India in June 1904. In an early age he left home to join Aurobindo Ghosh's fledgling ashram in Puducherry. From there he went to Santiniketan where he taught mathematics. In 1923 he graduated with honours in B.Sc. from Banaras Hindu University.

== Academia and research ==
=== Work with Marie Curie ===
After refusing a scholarship grant from England, he went to Paris to complete his M.Sc. Degree from University of Paris in 1929. He later wrote to Marie Curie, Polish physicist and chemist based in Paris, famous for her pioneering research on radioactivity expressing his desire to work with her, and was accepted into the Sorbonne where he completed his Doctor of Science in 1933. Here he worked with Marie Curie of Radium Institute, Paris for his doctoral thesis for four years as a recipient of a Curie-Carnegie Research Fellowship. The thesis covered ionization curve of alpha rays in pure gases including Krypton and Xenon and Naidu published his first research papers in French in the Journal of Physics and Radium, Paris, in 1934. Upon Curie's death in 1934, Ramaiah Naidu was running her laboratory for a while.

=== Post doctoral work ===
Later, he moved to England to work under the English experimental physicist Prof. P. M. S. Patrick Blackett, in London University for his Ph.D. thesis which was awarded to him in 1936. In 1936, the Tata Trust, Mumbai offered Ramaish Naidu the post of Chief Physicist at Tata Memorial Hospital, Bombay, and sought his expertise to help establish India's first Radon production facility for treatment in Cancer Management. In 1936, Ramaiah Naidu spent another two years at New York's Sloan Kettering Memorial Hospital, now known as Memorial Sloan–Kettering Cancer Center under G. Failla where he installed the Radium Extraction unit for radon production.

=== Radon production facility in India ===
During 1936, Tata Sons, Mumbai was keen to set up a Cancer Research Institute under Sir Dorabji Tata Trust in India and sought Ramaiah Naidu services to help establish India's first Radon production facility for treatment in Cancer Management.

In 1938 Ramaiah Naidu joined Tata Memorial Hospital (now Tata Memorial Centre), as its Chief Physicist and brought along with him the Radium Extraction unit and 2 g of Radium. He set up the country's first Radium Extraction unit well in time before the inauguration of the Tata Memorial Hospital on 28 February 1941. In 1957, the Indian Cancer Research Centre (later called the Cancer Research Institute), which was established in 1952 by the Government of India, took over the Tata Memorial Hospital and Cancer Research Institute and, in 1962, administrative control of the Tata Memorial Hospital was transferred to the Department of Atomic Energy, Government of India.

During the World War II years the process of decommissioning and re-commissioning the radon plant led to Naidu's bone marrow getting damaged and he developed artificial cancer due to his over exposure to radium. Essentially, he was advised to move away from radiation related jobs. In 1948, the Tata Trust sent Ramaiah Naidu and his family to Switzerland for treatment.

=== UNESCO years ===
Along with his family, Ramaiah Naidu recovered from the radium overexposure and bone marrow damage. Thereafter, he joined UNESCO in Paris as Programme Specialist in the Department of Natural Science where he initiated and implemented several projects for the improvement of science education. In 1955, on the request of Government of India Naidu transferred to India as Scientific director of UNESCO, South East Asia. During 1957 – 59, he worked with the All India Council for Secondary Education as Field Adviser.

== Personal life ==
Naidu met Marthe Mange of Swiss-French origin during the Second Round Table Conference in London. She was a journalist with Le Petit Democrat Populaire working in Paris and interested in Indology. She was the daughter of a wealthy businessman in the Vosges region of France, who helped the French Army during the World War I. The later day Italy dictator Benito Mussolini was one of Mange's former employees.

In 1940, the couple had a daughter, Leela Naidu who later acted in Indian Cinema, and was most famous for being listed as one of The World's Ten Most Beautiful Women by Vogue and several magazines during the 1960s. She was married to Tilak Raj Oberoi, son of Mohan Singh Oberoi, the founder of Oberoi Hotels and later to Dom Moraes the famous poet, writer and publisher based in Mumbai.

Ramaiah Naidu died on 6 June 1991, at the age of 87 years. The Association of Medical Physicists of India in 1992 created the Annual Dr. Ramaiah Naidu Memorial Oration Award in honour of Ramaiah's contribution and pioneering efforts in his works.
