= Love 24x7 =

- Directed by: Sreebala K Menon
- Written by: Sreebala K. Menon
- Produced by: Mukesh R. Mehta; Dileep
- Starring: Dileep; Nikhila Vimal; Sreenivasan; Suhasini; Sashi Kumar; Lena
- Cinematography: Sameer Haq
- Edited by: Mahesh Narayanan
- Music by: Bijibal
- Production companies: E4 Entertainment; Graand Production
- Release date: 18 July 2015 (India)
- Running time: 137 minutes
- Country: India
- Language: Malayalam

Love 24x7 is a 2015 Indian Malayalam romantic comedy film written and directed by debutante Sreebala K Menon starring Dileep and Nikhila Vimal in lead roles while Sreenivasan, Suhasini, Sashi Kumar, Lena and Alencier Ley Lopez play the supporting roles. Mukesh R Mehta and Dileep co-produced the film for E4 Entertainment in association with Graand Production. The music was composed by Bijibal while the lyrics were written by Rafeeq Ahmed. The film was released on Eid al-Fitr day, 18 July 2015.

== Plot ==
Roopesh, a media executive, falls in love with Kabani, a trainee, who works her way up to become a news presenter. The story also focuses on the love story of two old ex-lovers who were separated due to their careers. History repeats itself with Roopesh and Kabani becoming stars of their separate channels.

== Cast ==
- Dileep as Roopesh Nambiar
- Nikhila Vimal as Kabani "Karthika"
- Sreenivasan as Ummar Abdullah
- Suhasini as Dr. Sarayu
- Sashi Kumar as Dr. Satheesh
- Lena as Jayashree
- Anjali Nair as Nandhini
- Sudhi Koppa as Joshy
- Nandhini Sree as Soya Sreedharan
- Sidhartha Siva as Anthony
- Manju Pillai as Jessica Moses (Kabani's mother)
- Alancier Ley Lopez as Karthikeyan, Kabani's uncle
- Shankar Ramakrishnan as Murali Gopalakrishna Pillai
- Abhija Sivakala as Swetha Pillai
- Fara Shibila
- Saran Puthumana
- Jayapraksh Koolour as Senior Reporter
- Kottayam Purushan as Cabinet Minister Thommikkunju
- Dinesh Prabhakar
- Thesni Khan
- Idavela Babu
- Santhosh Pandit
- Krishna Praba as Nimisha
- Dileesh Pothan as News Reporter
- Moly Kannamali as himself (cameo appearance)
- Pauly Valsan as Canteen person

== Production ==
It is the first independent film of Kerala Sahitya Akademi Award winning writer Sreebala K Menon who was the former associate of director Sathyan Anthikad in five of his films. Sreebala, initially written the script, started it as the plot for a short story, but later weaved into a feature film with some changes. About the media-oriented theme, Sreebala says, "In Malayalam we have seen stories revolving around the life of reporters, the risks they take and the drama happening, both in the print and visual media. But what happens behind the camera, the normal life of news presenters, who in themselves are celebrities these days, are not explored much. Love 24x7 delves into those things."

The filming wrapped up in the last week of June 2015.

== Soundtrack ==
Music: Bijibal, lyrics: Rafeeq Ahamed

- "Venal Ozhiyunu" - Ganesh Sundaram, Sithara Krishnakumar
- "Veyilarum" - Minmini
