= Anuradha (1960 film) =

1960 film

- Poster
- Directed by: Hrishikesh Mukherjee
- Screenplay by: Shachin Bhowmick; Rajinder Singh Bedi; D. N. Mukherjee; Samir Chowdhary
- Story by: Sachin Bhowmick
- Produced by: Hrishikesh Mukherjee; L. B. Thakur
- Starring: Balraj Sahni; Leela Naidu
- Cinematography: Jaywant Pathare
- Edited by: Das Dhaimade
- Music by: Pandit Ravi Shankar (composer); Shailendra (lyricist)
- Release date: 1960
- Running time: 141 minutes
- Country: India
- Language: Hindi

Anuradha (Hindi: अनुराधा; English: Love of Anuradha) is a 1960 Hindi-language Indian film produced and directed by Hrishikesh Mukherjee. The film stars Balraj Sahni and Leela Naidu in lead roles along with Asit Sen and Mukri. The film is Miss India Naidu's debut film.

The film's music was composed by Pandit Ravi Shankar, in one of his rare forays into Hindi cinema. The film was based on a short story by Sachin Bhowmick, first published in the Bengali monthly magazine Desh, and according to his autobiography, Madame Bovary (1857) by Gustave Flaubert inspired him to create this story.

The film did not do well at the box office, but went on to win the National Film Award for Best Feature Film and was nominated for the Golden Bear at the 11th Berlin International Film Festival in 1961.

This dialogue by Nasir Hussain, "beti gaana gaao, main tumhare pita samaan hun", was repeated in the film Abhimaan. The dialogue writer and director of both films were the same: Rajinder Singh Bedi and Hrishikesh Mukherjee, respectively.

== Plot ==
Anuradha Roy (Leela Naidu), a noted radio singer, dancer and daughter of a rich man, falls in love with an idealistic doctor, Dr. Nirmal Chowdhary (Balraj Sahni). She decides to marry him against her father's will. Nirmal, whose mother died of illness, has decided to serve the poor in the distant village of Nandagaon. He asks Anuradha to not follow the hardships his life has, but to live the life her father plans. Still, she insists on following her love. She rejects the wedding proposal set by her father with the London-returned Deepak (Abhi Bhattacharya). Deepak wishes her well, and promises to help her in the future if she ever needs it.

After the marriage and a daughter, Anuradha realizes the gravity of the choice of living in a village. She now takes care of the family, doing all household chores, and she quits singing, which once was her life. One day, after many years, her father visits her family and reconciles. Seeing her poor condition, he asks them to come and stay in the city with him. But, due to his patients, Nirmal rejects the offer and promises to move after some time.

Deepak, while travelling with his girlfriend, meets with a car accident and is hence rushed to Dr. Nirmal. Nirmal does successful plastic surgery on his girlfriend. Deepak gets to stay with Anuradha for a few days and realizes her hardships. He requests her to leave Nirmal and move to the city and pursue her passion for music. She must decide between her love for her husband and music. The clinching moment is when Nirmal concedes to her desire to leave him and restart her life in the city. At this point she asks him, "Can't you ask him to go away? And never come back again?" indicating that she has no plans to leave him (her husband).

== Cast ==
- Balraj Sahni as Dr. Nirmal Chaudhary
- Leela Naidu as Anuradha Roy
- Ranu
- Abhi Bhattacharya as Deepak
- Nazir Hussain
- David
- Hari Shivdasani as Brijeshwar Prasad Roy
- Ashim Kumar
- Brahm Bhardwaj
- Bhudo Advani
- R.P. Kapoor
- Shailen Bose
- Khairati as asking the time to (Mukri)
- Asit Sen as Zamindar
- Mukri as Atmaram
- Rashid Khan as Bus conductor

== Awards ==
National Film Awards

- 1960: President's gold medal for the All India Best Feature Film

Berlin International Film Festival

- 1961: Golden Bear: Nomination

== Soundtrack ==
The film music department had a rare combination, sitar maestro Pandit Ravi Shankar, with lyricist Shailendra. Song Saanware Saanware sung by Lata Mangeshkar was based on Raag Bhairavi.

- "Jaane Kaise Sapno Main" - Lata Mangeshkar
- "Sanware Sanware Kahe Mose" - Lata Mangeshkar
- "Sun Mere Laal Yun Na Ho Behaal" - Manna Dey
- "Kaise Din Beete, Kaise Beeti Ratiyan" - Lata Mangeshkar
- "Bahut Din Huye" - Manna Dey, Mahendra Kapoor
- "Hai Re Woh Din Kyon Na Aaye" - Lata Mangeshkar
- "Bahut Din Huye" (2) - Lata Mangeshkar, Manna Dey, Mahendra Kapoor

The song "Sanware Sanware Kahe Mose" is set in raga Bhairavi.

The song "Kaise Din Beete, Kaise Beeti Ratiyan" is set in raga Manj Khamaj.
