= Umeed (1962 film) =

- Directed by: Nitin Bose
- Produced by: Rajan Sahai
- Starring: Ashok Kumar; Joy Mukherjee; Nanda; Leela Naidu
- Edited by: Bimal Roy
- Music by: Ravi
- Release date: 1971
- Country: India
- Language: Hindi

Umeed is a 1971 Indian Hindi romantic drama film directed by Nitin Bose, with Ashok Kumar, Joy Mukherjee, Nanda, Leela Naidu playing the lead roles.

The film has a hit music by Ravi and lyrics by Shakeel Badayuni with song like Mujhe Ishq Hai Tujhise sung by Mohammed Rafi becoming all-time hit. In a rare instance, Ravi, the music director sang two of the songs too in the movie. The movie was ready to release in 1962, but it was a delayed release in 1971, due to distribution problems.

== Cast ==
- Ashok Kumar as Jwalaprasad
- Joy Mukherjee as Shankar
- Nanda as Leela
- Leela Naidu as Mala
- Kartar Singh as Mill Gatekeeper
- Leela Mishra as Leela Naidu
- Tarun Bose as Shukla
- Chandrima Bhaduri as Shankar's mother
- Sabita Chatterjee as Rosie
- Ravikant as Doctor
- Nazir Kashmiri as Servant
- Laxmi Chhaya as dancer / singer
- Jeevan Kala as dancer / singer
- Madhumati as dancer / singer

== Soundtrack ==
Song	Singer
"Umeed Ke Sahare"	Ravi
"Mera Dil Hai Pyar Ka"	Ravi
"Mujhe Ishq Hai Tujhise"	Mohammed Rafi
"Aaja Meri Jaan Tere Qurbaan"	Mahendra Kapoor, Usha Mangeshkar
"Dil Ko Bachana Babuji, Na Aana Tum Kabhi"	Usha Mangeshkar, Asha Bhosle
"Humne Chaha Magar"	Asha Bhosle
"Thodi Si Aur Pee Le"	Asha Bhosle
