= N. S. Madhavan =

Indian writer of Malayalam literature (born 1948)

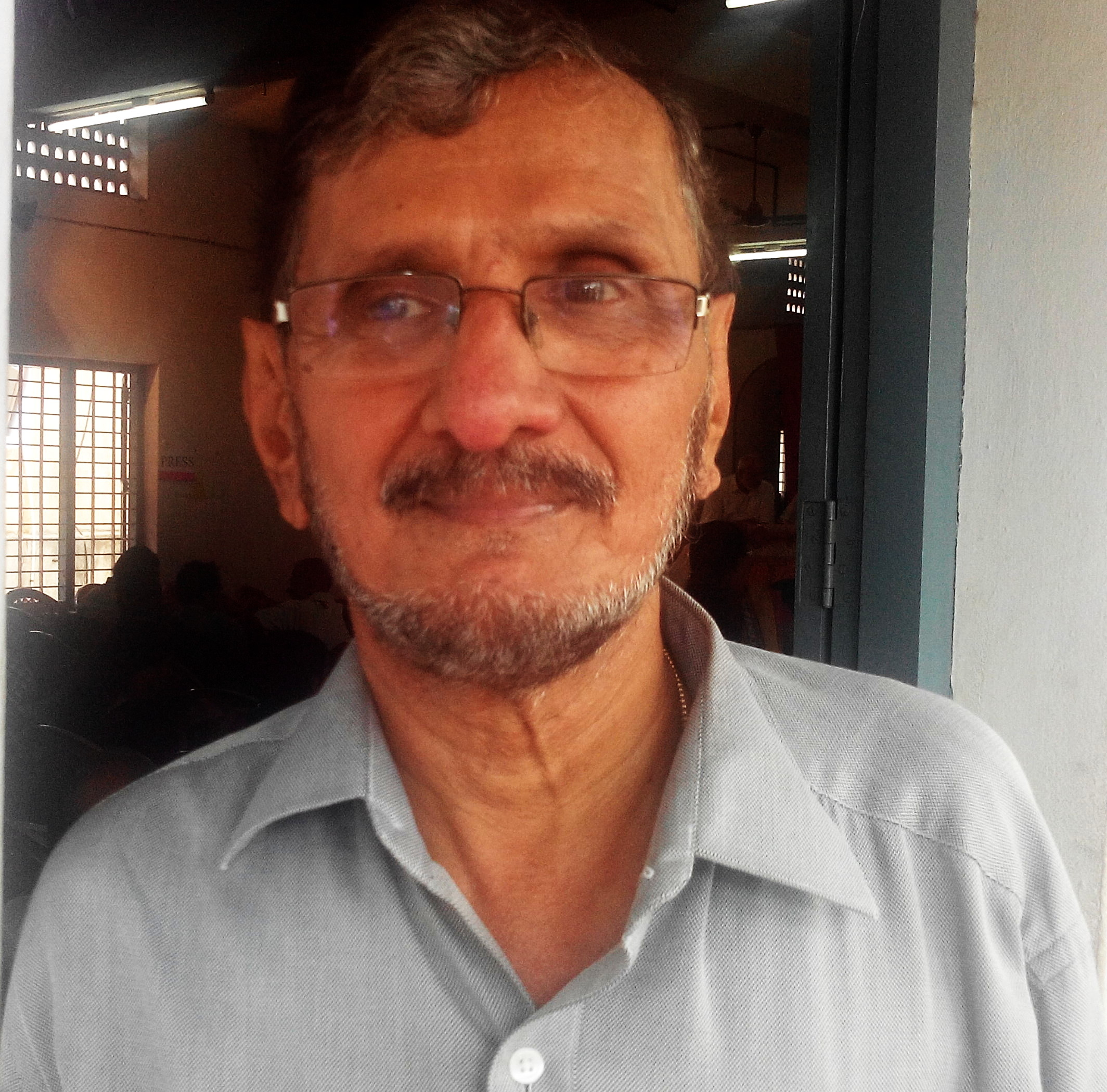
- Madhavan in July 2015
- Born: 9 September 1948 (age 78); Cochin, Cochin State, Dominion of India (present-day Kochi, Kerala, India)
- Education: Maharaja's College, Ernakulam; Mar Ivanios College, Thiruvananthapuram
- Occupations: Novelist, short story writer, columnist, IAS Officer
- Spouse: Sheela Reddy
- Children: Meenakshi Reddy Madhavan
- Writing career
- Language: Malayalam
- Genres: Novel, short story, essays
- Subject: Social aspects
- Notable works: Higuita; Thiruth; Chulaimedile Shavangal; Pancha Kanyakakal; Lanthan Batheriyile Luthiniyakal
- Notable awards: 1993 Padmarajan Award; 1994 Odakkuzhal Award; 1995 Kerala Sahitya Akademi Award for Story; 2004 Kerala Sahitya Akademi Award for Novel; 2009 Muttathu Varkey Award; 2010 Crossword Book Award; 2018 Mathrubhumi Literary Award; 2024 Ezhuthachan Puraskaram

N. S. Madhavan (born 9 September 1948) is an Indian writer of Malayalam literature. Known for his novel, Lanthan Batheriyile Luthiniyakal (Litanies of the Dutch Battery) and a host of short stories such as Higuita, Thiruthu, Chulaimedile Shavangal and Vanmarangal Veezhumpol, Madhavan also writes football columns and travel articles. He is a distinguished fellow of Kerala Sahitya Akademi and a recipient of several major awards including Odakkuzhal Award, Kerala Sahitya Akademi Award for Story, Kerala Sahitya Akademi Award for Novel, Muttathu Varkey Award, Mathrubhumi Literary Award, Crossword Book Award and Kerala State Students Federation Sahithyolsav Award.

== Biography ==
N. S. Madhavan, born on September 9, 1948, in the port city of Cochin did his school education at Sree Rama Varma High School and graduated in economics from Maharaja's College, Ernakulam. His post-graduate studies were at the Department of Economics, University of Kerala. During this period he began writing, and in 1970 won the top prize for his first published short story 'Shishu', in a contest organised by the Malayalam literary magazine Mathrubhumi. He joined the Indian Administrative Service in 1975 and started his administrative career as a member of the Bihar cadre. After serving in Bihar in various capacities, he returned to his home state in 1988.

Madhavan is married to Sheela Reddy, a book editor of Outlook, an English magazine published in New Delhi. Their daughter, Meenakshi Reddy Madhavan is a well-known blogger and the author of works such as You Are Here, Confessions of a Listmaniac and Cold Feet.

== Writing career ==
=== Stories ===
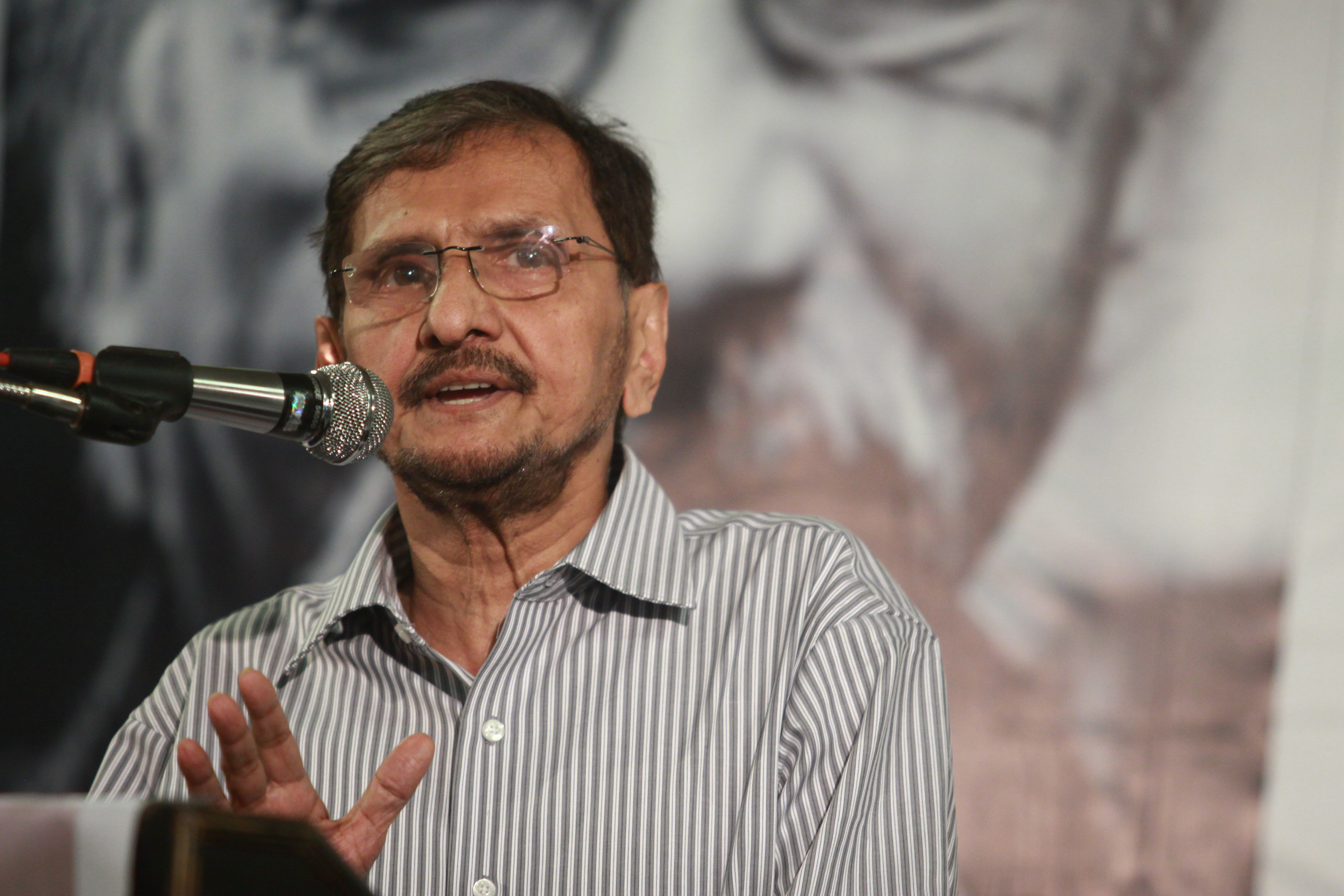
N.S Madhavan

In the 1980s, Madhavan went through a decade-long period of writer's block, until the release of his story 'Higuita' in 1990. In this work, Madhavan models his protagonist, Father Geevarghese, on René Higuita, the 1990 FIFA World Cup goalkeeper for Colombia and his unconventional playing style whereby he would often abandon his goal and try to score goals, occupies the priest's imagination. Likewise, he temporarily abandons his cassock and saves a tribal girl Lucie from the clutches of the trafficker Jabbar. The short story was rated among the best Malayalam stories in the last century. It has since been adapted into a play, Higuita: A Goalie's Anxiety at Penalty Kick, by Sasidharan Naduvil. Thiruthu (Blue Pencil, on the Babri Masjid demolition), Chulaimedile Shavangal (Corpses of Chulaimed), Vanmarangal Veezhumpol (When the Big Trees Fall, on the 1984 anti-Sikh violence), Paryaya Kathakal (Synonymous Stories), Nilavili (The Cry), Muyal Vetta (Hare Hunt, on the Emergency) and Nalam Lokam (The Fourth World, on the collapse of the Soviet Union) are some of his other notable short stories. His stories are known to represent the uncertainties, ambiguities and tragedies of the modern world.

=== Novel ===
After thirty three years as a writer, Madhavan published his debut novel in 2003 as Lanthan Batheriyile Luthiniyakal. The novel is about the life on an imaginary island in the Kochi backwaters, named after a 17th-century battery (bathery in Malayalam) of five cannons installed on its promontory by the Dutch (Lanthans in Malayalam). Jessica, the young narrator of the story, is the scion of a family of carpenters with a long tradition of boat building. Her reminiscences start from the days when she was inside her pregnant mother's womb. The novel presents an intimate picture of life of the Latin Christians of the Kerala coast, descendants of poor, low-caste Hindus who were converted to Christianity by Portuguese colonists in the 16th century. The first edition of the novel was sold out in a month.

The novel is set between 1951 and 1967, the first sixteen years of Jessica life, but draws upon history going back to the time of Vasco Da Gama. She was born at a time when people used to run away from cow-pox vaccinators as well as the period when Kerala embraced communism, which the novelist calls the watermelon years – an allusion to the verdant green-canopied Kerala with its hidden red watermelons. There are captivating descriptions of Latin catholic residents of the Dutch Battery preparing themselves for months prior to the staging of Karalman Charitham a Chavittu Nadakam or an operatic play about Charlemagne, originally written in Tamil and pidgin Latin by Chinnathambi Annavi in the 16th century. Set against the background of the city of Madhavan's birth, Kochi, the Lanthan Batheriyile Luthiniyakal is a roller coaster ride through micro histories, the nascent days of a newly independent country, the growth and decline of ideas, and the randomness of events affecting human lives. Well-known Malayalam novelist M. Mukundan made the following assessment after reviewing the novel, "N.S. Madhavan has rejuvenated Malayalam fiction." He summarises the novel thus: "[The book] is all about history and imagination—the protogonists of new fiction that is in vogue." Mukundan added, "The novel is heavily populated with communists, priests, carpenters, cooks, boatmen, librarians, school teachers, even tailors. At times you will come across history makers from faraway Russia – Joseph Stalin, Imre Nagy, Nikita Khrushchev..."

=== Other works ===
In 2006, Madhavan published has written two plays, Rayum Mayum and Arbhudhavaidyan, published together as a book, Randu Natakangal, in 2006. His novel Lanthanbatheriyile Luthiniyakal was translated into English by Rajesh Rajamohan under the title Litanies of Dutch Battery and published in October 2010 by Penguin Books. The work was the winner of the 2010 Crossword Book Award (Indian language translations) and featured in the Man Asian Literary Prize long list and the 2011 The Hindu Literary Prize short list. Kaya Taran, the 2004 Hindi movie by Sashi Kumar, is based on When Big Trees Fall, a short story by Madhavan about the homicidal attacks on the Sikhs that followed the Assassination of Indira Gandhi, the then Indian Prime Minister. He also edited one book, Malayala Kathakal, composed of 60 short stories by various writers.

== Awards ==
Madhavan, who topped the field in a literary competition conducted by Mathrubhumi in 1970 for his short story, Shishu, received the Padmarajan Award for his work, Thiruthu in 1993 and a year later, he received the 1994 Odakkuzhal Award for Higuita. Higuita was selected for another award in 1995, the Kerala Sahitya Akademi Award for Story; he would receive another award from Kerala Sahitya Akademi in 2004, Kerala Sahitya Akademi Award for Novel for Lanthan Batheriyile Luthiniyakal. The novel was included in the long list for the 2007 Man Asian Literary Prize, the prize eventually going to the Chinese novel, Wolf Totem. He received one more award for Higuita, the Muttathu Varkey Award in 2009 followed by the Padmaprabha Literary Award, the same year. The English translation of his novel, Litanies of Dutch Battery, was shortlisted for The Hindu Literary Prize in 2011. Kerala Sahitya Akademi honoured him with fellowship in 2013. He received the Padmaprabha Literary Prize in 2015 and two awards in 2018, the Mathrubhumi Literary Award and the Literary Award of the Bahrain Keraleeya Samajam.

== Bibliography ==
=== Novels ===
- Madhavan, N. S. (2003). Lanthan Batheriyile Luthiniyakal. [Kottayam]: DC Books. ISBN 8126406178. OCLC 54073729.

=== Short stories ===
- Madhavan, N. S. (1994). Chulaimedile Shavangal. Kōṭṭayaṃ: DC Books. ISBN 8171303587. OCLC 33331433.
- Madhavan, N. S. (1996). Thiruthu. [Kottayam]: DC Books. ISBN 8171306454. OCLC 37115281.
- Madhavan, N. S. (2007). Nilaviḷi. [Kottayam]: DC Books. ISBN 978-8126415274. OCLC 316853404.
- N.S. Madhavan (2012). Higuita. DC Books. ASIN B007E4W0A8.
- N. S. Madhavan (2015). Shishu (audiobook). DC Books. ASIN B00VWVSJAO.
- Madhavan, N. S. (2015). Pancha Kanyakakal. Kottayam, Kerala State, India: DC Books. ISBN 9788126452514. OCLC 908247775.
- Madhavan, N. S. (2016). "Ente Priyapetta Kathakal" (in Malayalam). DC Books.
- Madhavan, N.S., ed. (2017). Malayala Kadha- 60 Kadhakal. DC Books. OCLC 1015264445.
- N. S. Madhavan (2000). Paryayakathakal. DC Books.
- Madhavan, N. S. (2011). N.S. Madhavante Kadhakal Sampooornam. [Kottayam]: DC Books. ISBN 9788126433056. OCLC 787511653.
- Nalam Lokam

=== Plays ===
- Madhavan, N. S. (2006). "Randu nadakangal" (in Malayalam). DC Books.

=== Essays ===
- N. S. Madhavan (2010). Puram Marupuram. Mathrubhumi Books. ISBN 978-8182652279.
- N. S. Madhavan (2020). Thalsamayam. Malayala Manorama Books. ISBN 9789389649055.

=== Articles ===
- Madhavan, N. S. (2 April 2016). "There is little silver on the screen". The Hindu.
- Madhavan, N. S. (17 December 2016). "Silence of the majority". The Indian Express.
- Madhavan, N. S. (11 July 2016). "Voices in Time". The Indian Express.
- Madhavan, N. S. (9 September 2015). "What A Controversial Sri Narayana Guru Tableaux Tells Us About Kerala Politics". Huffington Post.

=== Translations to other languages ===
- Madhavan, N.S. (2005). Sarmishta (in Tamil). Translated by Shailaja, K. V. Vamsi Books. ASIN B00HR1UCRQ.
- Madhavan, N. S. (2010). Litanies of Dutch battery. Translated by Rajamohan, Rajesh. New Delhi: Penguin Books. ISBN 9780143065029. OCLC 689015005.
- Madhavan, N. S. (2018). Beerangi Paadalgal (in Tamil). Translated by Murukan, Era. Kizhakku Pathippagam. ISBN 978-9386737489.
- Madhava, N. S. (2012). Perumarangal Vizhumpozhuthu (in Tamil). Translated by Nirmalya. Nagarcoil: Kalachuvadu Publications. ISBN 9789381969601. OCLC 845242649.
