= Cine Blitz =

Hindi and English film magazine

- An issue of Cine Blitz featuring Jacqueline Fernandez on the cover
- Categories: Film Magazine
- Frequency: Monthly
- Circulation: 1 million
- First issue: December 1974
- Company: MH One TV Network Ltd
- Country: India
- Based in: Mumbai
- Language: English & Hindi
- Website: www.cineblitz.in
- ISSN: 0971-9970
- OCLC: 18389308

Cine Blitz is a Hindi and English film magazine published every month from Mumbai about Bollywood, Hindi cinema. Started in December 1974, as of 2006, it was one of the top three film magazines in India. Currently Cine Blitz belongs to MH One TV Network Ltd

== History ==
Cine Blitz was launched by Russi Karanjia's Rifa Publications in December 1974, and his daughter Rita Mehta became the first editor-in-chief of the magazine. The first issue of December 1974, had Zeenat Aman on the cover. To give the new magazine "a flying start", Rita Mehta approached Protima Bedi and asked her to streak across Mumbai, first at Flora Fountain and then at Juhu Beach. Pictures of it would be carried in the inside pages of the inaugural edition.

The ensuing controversy forced the magazine to then (falsely) claim that the naked run was actually shot in Goa and later superimposed on images of Mumbai. However, the goal of popularising the new magazine was achieved and Cine Blitz went on to become one of India's leading film and gossip magazines for years to come. Its attitude was reflected in its rather tongue-in-cheek tagline of "C to Z of Hindi Films - Everyone covers AB".

For the subsequent three decades Cine Blitz continued to be a leading film magazine. However around 2000, the magazine sales stagnated for three years and in 2001 it was acquired by UB Group chairman Vijay Mallya under groups by VJM Media Private Limited, though Rita Mehta, its previous owner continued as editor-in-chief of the magazine.

The acquisition lead to the revamp of the magazine, and in 2003 Cine Blitz launched its international editions, US and UK editions catering to the Asian diaspora, with launch function in London. And in 2006, Rita Mehta was replaced as editor-in-chief by Nishi Prem, the former editor of Stardust.

In 2009, to mark its 35th anniversary, the magazine released a coffee table book about history of Hindi film industry, Love & Longing in Hindi Cinema by editor Nishi Prem.

Since May 2020, Cineblitz launched an exclusive digital only edition and in June 2020 Cineblitz announced its Annual Awards.

== Bibliography ==
- Nishi Prem (2009). Love and Longing in Hindi Cinema. VJM Media.
