= Elvis Stephenson =

Indian politician

Member of Legislative Assembly, Telangana
- In office 2014–2020
- Preceded by: Seat established
- Succeeded by: Seat abolished
- Constituency: Nominated Anglo-Indian

Personal details
- Born: April 12, 1957 (age 68)
- Political party: Bharat Rashtra Samithi

Elvis Stephenson (born 12 April 1957) is an Anglo-Indian politician who was nominated to the Telangana Legislative Assembly for the Anglo-Indian reserved seat in 1st Telangana Assembly and was re-nominated in 2nd Telangana Assembly until its abolition in 2020.

== Personal life ==
Stephenson was born on 12 April 1957 to R.E. Stephenson and Marie Florence Stephenson in Hyderabad. He is married to Christine Maria Stephenson and has one daughter. He has a Master of Business Administration and a postgraduate diploma in Entrepreneurship Development.
