= Sashi Kumar =

Indian journalist, film maker

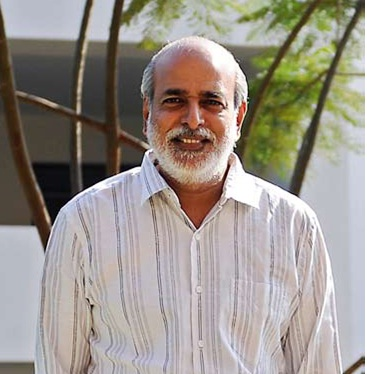
- Born: Kodungallur, Thrissur district, Travancore–Cochin (present-day Kerala), India
- Education: Loyola College, Chennai; Madras Christian College
- Occupations: Journalist; TV Anchor; Film maker; , Media Development Foundation and Asian College of Journalism
- Known for: Media Development Foundation and Asian College of Journalism

Sashi Kumar is an Indian journalist. He set up the Asian College of Journalism in Chennai, which was administered by the Media Development Foundation which he had founded.

== Early life and education ==
Kumar was born at Karupadanna near Kodungallur in the Thrissur District of the erstwhile State of Travancore–Cochin. He studied at Sacred Heart High School in Mumbai and at Don Bosco School, Egmore. He then graduated from Loyola College, Chennai, and completed his postgraduation from the Madras Christian College.

== Career ==
=== As filmmaker ===
In 2004, he scripted and directed a full length feature film in Hindi titled Kaya Taran (Chrysalis). The film is based on the anti-Sikh riots of 1984 and 2002 Gujarat riots.

He ran a regular column titled “Unmediated” in the fortnightly Frontline and articles were compiled under the same title and published by Tulika Books, New Delhi in 2013. He is also a member of Malcolm and Elizabeth Adiseshiah Trust. He is the chairman of the Asian College of Journalism.

In July 2021, along with N. Ram, he approached the Supreme Court and sought a probe into the Pegasus scandal. He also sought the Court to look into the Constitutional validity of the offence of sedition.

=== Digital platform, Asiaville ===
In April 2019, he launched Asiaville, a multi-platform digital media venture. Asiaville partnered with Twitter (now X.com) and IIT Madras. In August 2022, Spotify announced a collaboration with Asiaville.that is expected to enable 1000 language podcast creators. In December 2022, Asiaville launched a 20-episode podcast on a 2017 book, Veerappan: Chasing a brigand.

== Filmography ==
Year	Title	Role	Notes
1980	Iniyum Marichittillatha Nammal		
2004	Kaya Taran		Directorial debut
2009	Loudspeaker	Anand Menon	
2014	Balyakalasakhi	Ameen Sahib	
2015	Love 24x7	Dr. Satheesh	
2015	Ennu Ninte Moideen	Kottatil Madhavan	
2020	Death, Lies & Cyanide	Narrator	Podcast

== Awards ==
- 2007: Viayaraghavan Memorial Award for his contribution to journalism by Kerala government.
- 2005: G. Aravindan Award for Best Debut Filmmaker for Kaya Taran.
- He received the Swadeshabhimani Award by the Government of Kerala in 2012.
