= Karl Jamshed Khandalavala =

Indian Parsi art connoisseur (1904–1995)

Karl Jamshed Khandalavala (16 March 1904 – 23 December 1995) was an Indian Parsi art connoisseur, lawyer, and an Indian Air Force officer. He was a long time trustee and chairman of the former Prince of Wales Museum of Western India, Mumbai. He was awarded with Padma Shri, the fourth highest civilian award in India, in 1970, for his contribution to arts. He was also a recipient of Lalit Kala Akademi fellowship in 1980.

As a lawyer, he had famously represented the defense in the case of K. M. Nanavati v. State of Maharashtra.
