= Blitz (newspaper) =

Former Indian investigative newspaper

- Type: Weekly newspaper/Weekly newsmagazine
- Format: Tabloid
- Founder: Russi Karanjia
- Editor: Russi Karanjia
- Founded: 1 February 1941
- Ceased publication: Mid 1990s
- Language: English, Hindi, Urdu, Marathi
- Headquarters: Mumbai, India
- Country: India

Blitz was a popular investigative weekly tabloid newspaper or newsmagazine published and edited by Russi Karanjia from Bombay. Started in 1941, it was India's first weekly tabloid and focused on investigative journalism and political news. It was published in English, and with editions in Hindi, Urdu and Marathi languages.

== History ==
First published on 1 February 1941, the magazine was a pioneer of investigative journalism in India.

Sudheendra Kulkarni, an Indian politician and journalist who worked with Blitz, said that the decision to launch Blitz had been taken over a cup of tea. Three patriotic journalists — B. V. Nadkarni, Benjamin Horniman and Karanjia himself — sat at Wayside Inn, a restaurant located near the historical Kala Ghoda area in Mumbai to conceptualise the paper.

The paper was launched from an old Apollo Street building in the Fort locality of Mumbai, then known as Bombay.

Its inaugural issue introduced the tabloid as Our BLITZ, India's BLITZ against Hitler. It claimed a circulation of 20,000 within four months of launch, and later said it had a readership of one million some 25 years later.

== Prominent journalists and associates ==
Cartoonist R. K. Laxman's early cartoons would be published in Blitz, and so would Abu Abraham's. Cartoonist–cum–architect Cecil Lancelot Dawes contributed heavily to Blitz. His daughter Shirley Dawes also worked for Karanjia for many years before migrating to the West. Noted writer K. A. Abbas wrote the popular column "Last Page" for Blitz, which ran for over 40 years. Journalist P. Sainath worked as deputy editor with Blitz for over a decade before he started writing about rural poverty and winning the Magsaysay Award.

Blitz was founded Karanjia, who had entered journalism with the then British-owned The Times of India, had then briefly edited The Sunday Standard and the short-lived Morning Standard. On his four-man team besides himself were "Dinkar V. Nadkarni, who had earned a reputation in journalism by penning sensational crime stories in the Bombay Sentinel, edited by the veteran B.G. Horniman; Zahir Babar Kureishi, who wrote a popular column under the pen-name of ZABAK; and Nadir Boman-Behram, who was to look after the advertising and business side of things."

Among the prominent leftwing columnists of Blitz were Ramesh Sanghvi, A. Raghavan, and K.A. Abbas.

== Reputation ==
Blitz has been described as featuring "sensational accounts of national and international skulduggery" and a "spunky tabloid’s loud and screaming captions and telling photographs". Part of its "self-representation as a radical, people's paper was its tabloid form" and this weekly newsmagazine "revelled in its self-proclaimed role as a racket-buster, exposing truths concealed by the powerful." Blitz called itself Asia’s foremost news magazine. It is seen as having had a "brash tone... set to orchestrate a relentlessly nationalist line strongly inflected by leftist themes."

Blitz has also been described as "[a]n unapologetic supporter of Nehru, it vigorously championed secularism, supported socialism and planning, denounced capitalism, and poured scorn on right wing and communal politicians." It supported "leftist internationalism... lauded Afro-Asian solidarity against the capitalist West – the Egyptian President Nasser was its hero – and it loudly and regularly unveiled dark, CIA plots against India and Third World leaders." It was seen as indulging in "muckraking, over-the top stories calculated to provoke and enrage. It thrived on controversy, and Karanjia was frequently embroiled in defamation suits".

Gyan Prakash writes:

The embezzlement of public funds, prostitution rackets, sordid stories of seduction and sex in the name of spiritualism, dark political designs behind high-sounding rhetoric, and the fleecing of the poor by rich industrialists and property developers were staples in the weekly. Even the sports column, called ‘Knock Out’, took on the racket-busting posture. It was written by A.F.S. Talyarkhan, whose bearded, pipe-in-mouth, face on the page appeared to lend gravity to the charges of malfeasance he made against sports authorities. The poor performance of Indian athletes in international competitions, it turned out, could be explained by petty squabbles and power-grabbing by officials behind the scenes.

The Blitz is credited with doing more than all "to make a routine murder trial into a classic story of Bombay’s bourgeois life" in the Nanavati murder case of 1959.

== Events organised ==
Blitz was associated with organising India's longest cycle race on the occasion of Nehru's 100th birth anniversary—called the Blitz-Nehru Integration Tour of India—which was meant to be done on the lines of the Tour de France or Giro or La Vuelta. It had a top prize of Rs 100,000—then a substantial amount. The 10-day nine-stage 1,442 km held in 1989 from Mumbai-New Delhi, it has been claimed, "still remains India's greatest, longest and toughest stage cycle."

== Film magazine ==
Later in 1974, Blitz also started a film magazine, Cine Blitz, with, Karanjia's daughter Rita Mehta as its editor. In 1983, criminal-politicians Gopal Rajwani and Pappu Kalani executed the brutal knife murder of A V Narayan, sub-editor of Blitz.

== Morning tabloid ==
Karanjia founded a morning tabloid called The Daily for some years. After reaching its zenith in the 1980s sales declined in the 1990s. In 1996, Karl Mehta, then managing director and publisher, and Karanajia's son-in-law reached an agreement with the Daily Mirror to publish news from the Daily Mirror, Sunday Mirror, The Independent and People magazine. At the time, chairman of United Spirits Vijay Mallya owned 8% stake in Blitz.

== Ceases publication ==
It ceased publication several years before Karanjia's death in mid-1990s, although there were some attempts to revive it. Karanjia died on 1 February 2008, on the same day he started his newspaper 67 years earlier.

The Bangladesh-based tabloid with the same name is unrelated to this publication.
