= Prabhasakshi =

Indian Hindi-language news website

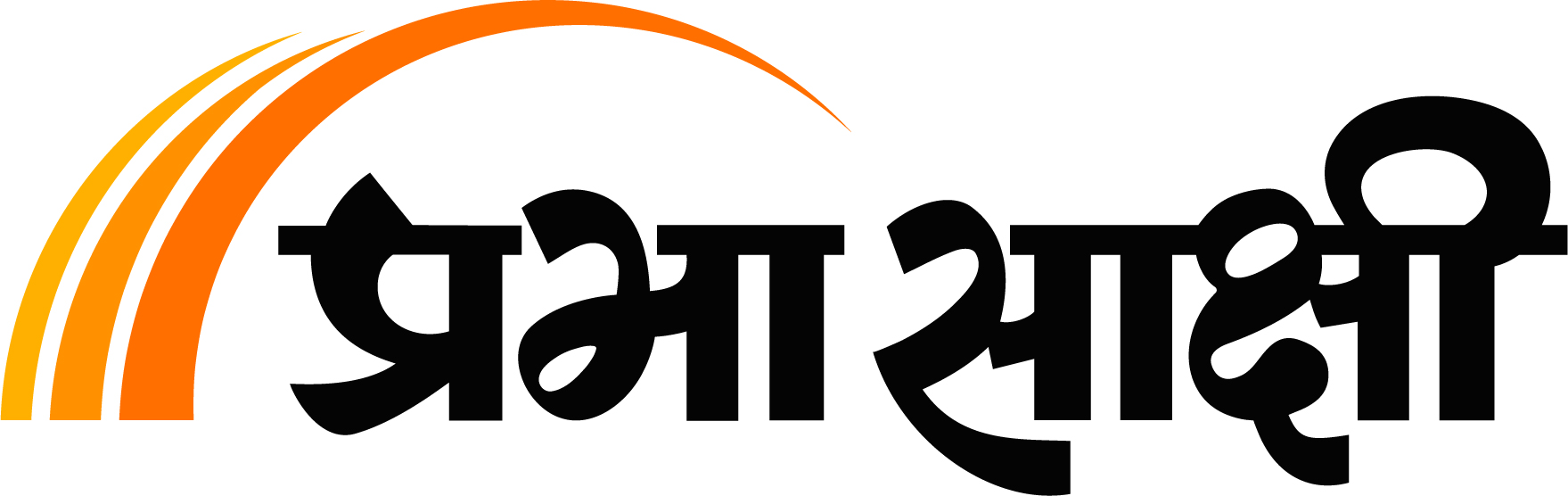
- Website type: Online newspaper
- Available in: Hindi
- Founded: 26 October 2001
- Headquarters: New Delhi, India
- Owner: Dwarikesh Informatics Limited
- Founder: Gautam R. Morarka
- Website: prabhasakshi.com

Prabhasakshi (Hindi: प्रभासाक्षी, romanized: prabhaasaakshee) is a free digital Hindi news website, founded in 2001. The website has news, features, analysis, and videos on national, international, sports, health, entertainment and elections related topics from India and around the world. Operations are managed by the incorporated organization Dwarikesh Informatics Limited.

== History ==
Prabhasakshi was founded by its current Chief Editor Gautam Morarka. The name of the website is derived from Hindi that means and literally translates to ‘the witness of breaking dawn' In English

The website is run from New Delhi office since 2001. Prabhasakshi is self financed website and earns through advertisements and private and government advertisements.

== Content and Contributors ==
Prabhasakshi's content is procured from contracted, freelance and occasional writers. Prabhasakshi claims to publish around 150 articles every day. Some of the well known names who have written on the site include Mr. Tarun Vijay, Mr. Sanjay Dwivedi, Late Mr. Arun Jaitley to name a few. The website also has an Android app. The website is among top Hindi news sites listed on Indian Government's Rajya Sabha's official portal.

== Reach ==
The site's monthly user base is approximately 20 Lakh (1.05 million). Prabhasakshi also has partnerships with browsers and mobile News Aggregators, which publish the website's content on their platforms. Prabhasakshi news is available on platforms like DailyHunt and JioNews
