= Russi Karanjia =

Indian Journalist

- Born: 15 September 1912
- Died: 1 February 2008
- Relatives: B. K. Karanjia (brother)

Rustom Khurshedji Karanjia (15 September 1912 – 1 February 2008) was an Indian journalist and editor. He typically signed his reports as "R. K. Karanjia". He founded the Blitz, a weekly tabloid with a focus on investigative journalism, in 1941, and ran it for the next four decades. He also founded The Daily, a daily tabloid which was run by his daughter.

== Early life and background ==
Karanjia was born to a Parsi family in Quetta, now in Balochistan, in the Northern part of Pakistan.

== Career ==
Karanjia began writing while still in college, and during the 1930s, Karanjia was employed as an assistant editor at The Times of India. He left The Times of India in 1941 to launch Blitz (newspaper), a weekly tabloid with a focus on investigative journalism. It was one of the few Indian newspapers to have carried out interviews with the high and mighty, including the likes of Fidel Castro and Zhou Enlai. The Daily and The Blitz were also incubators for the likes of R.K. Laxman, Haroon Rashid, P. Sainath, and Teesta Setalvad, all of whom started their journalistic careers there. Karanjia served as a war correspondent during the Japanese Burma offensive in World War II, reporting on the action in Burma and Assam. Blitz folded during the mid-1990s, and Karanjia retired from public life.

Karanjia died at his home, a seafront flat along Marine Drive, in Mumbai, at the age of 95 on 1 February 2008. In a "departure from Parsi tradition, as per his wishes," his funeral was held at the Chandanvadi crematorium, in south Mumbai. Karanjia was survived by one daughter, Rita Mehta, the founder and first Editor-in-Chief of Cine Blitz magazine. His brother, Burjor, was also a journalist, albeit in the film industry, editor of Filmfare.

== Notable Interviews ==
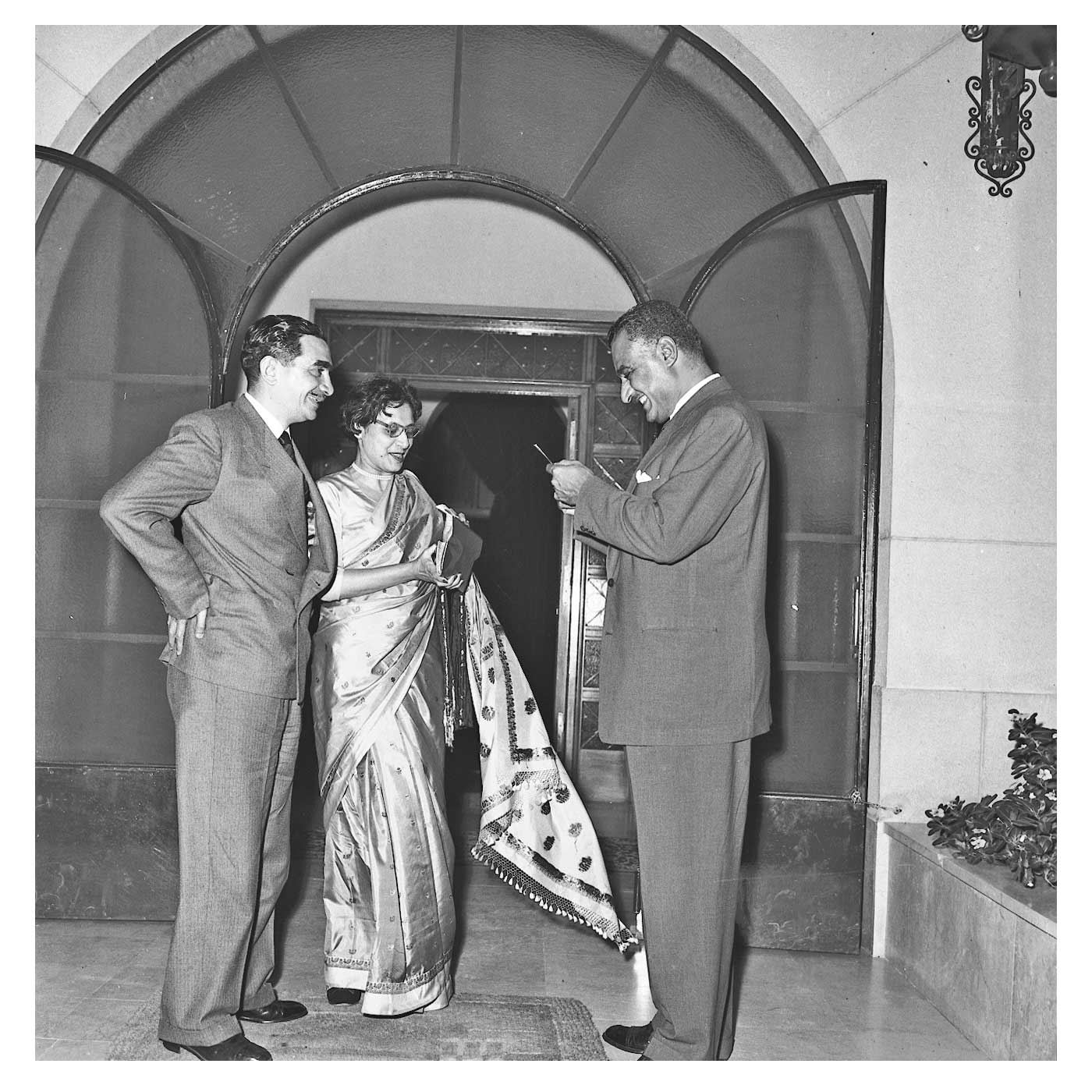
Nasser receiving the Indian journalist Karanjia and his wife (7)

In a 1958 interview, President Gamal Abdel Nasser of the United Arab Republic recommended Karanjia to read the Antisemitic hoax, the Protocols of the Elders of Zion, as Karanjia reported the next day.

== Leanings as owner-editor of Blitz ==
Karanjia was the founder and the owner-editor of Blitz, a weekly tabloid published out of Mumbai. The columnist Sudheendra Kulkarni wrote about how the decision to launch Blitz was taken over a cup of tea between three patriotic journalists, i.e., BV Nadkarni, Benjamin Horniman, and Karanjia, at the Wayside Inn, a restaurant near Kala Ghoda, Mumbai. The first issue of Blitz was published on 1 February 1941 (the same day that Karanjia died in 2008). Kulkarni calls his journalism "irreverent, investigative, courageous and a little titillating". Filmmaker Khwaja Ahmad Abbas and Magsaysay-award-winning journalist P. Sainath were associated with Blitz. Blitz was radical and idealistic, left-leaning, and pro-Soviet.

Karanjia remained a staunch critic of the Congress party while continuing to remain friendly with Congress leaders Nehru, Indira Gandhi, and Rajiv Gandhi. However, Karanjia later became disillusioned with communism and its anti-Hindu secularism. He became a strong sympathiser of the Bharatiya Janata Party and the Ayodhya movement. Initially a fierce critic of the Indian guru Sathya Sai Baba, Karanjia later became his devotee in 1976. According to Kulkarni, P. Sainath was replaced as the magazine's deputy editor by Karanjia, who appointed Kulkarni to the post instead of him.

== Books ==
- 1952: China stands up and wolves of the Wild West
- 1956: SEATO: Security or Menace?
- 1958: Arab Dawn
- 1960: The Mind of Mr. Nehru
- 1961: Castro: Storm Over Latin America
- 1966: The Philosophy Of Mr. Nehru
- 1970: Round Germany with Hitler
- 1977: Kundalini Yoga
- 1977: Mind of a Monarch: Biography of the Shah of Iran ISBN 978-0-04-923069-9
- 1997: God Lives In India ISBN 978-81-86822-27-2
