= List of ZEE5 original programming =

ZEE5 is an Indian on-demand Internet streaming media provider run by Zee Entertainment Enterprises. It was launched in India on 14 February 2018 with content in 12 languages. The service has distributed a number of original programs, including original series, specials, miniseries, documentaries and films.

== 2018 ==
Title	Episodes	Genre	Premiere	Language	Ref.
Dhatt Tere Ki	4	Comedy	9 February 2018	Hindi	
Nanna Koochi	8	Drama	12 February 2018	Telugu	
America Mappillai	8	Comedy	14 February 2018	Tamil	
Utsaha Ithihasam	8	Drama	14 February 2018	Malayalam	
Table No 5	6	Thriller	25 March 2018	Hindi	
Life Sahi Hai	5	Drama	25 March 2018	Hindi	
Life Sahi Hai 2	5	Drama	4 April 2018	Hindi	
Zero KMS	12	Mystery, Thriller	29 May 2018	Hindi	
Babbar Ka Tabbar (season 1)	12	Drama, Comedy	20 June 2018	Hindi	
The Story	6	Drama	25 June 2018	Hindi	
Jashn-e-Zindagi	7	Drama	2 July 2018	Hindi	
Karenjit Kaur - The Untold Story of Sunny Leone (season 1)	10	Drama	16 July 2018	Hindi	
Kallachirippu	8	Drama	23 July 2018	Tamil	
Liftman	10	Comedy	26 July 2018	Marathi	
Lockdown	8	Music	17 August 2018	Hindi	
Akoori	12	Drama, Comedy	30 August 2018	Hindi	
Babbar Ka Tabbar (season 2)	12	Drama, Comedy	5 September 2018	Hindi	
Karenjit Kaur - The Untold Story of Sunny Leone (season 2)	6	Drama	18 September 2018	Hindi	
Chitra Vichitram	10	Comedy	4 October 2018	Telugu	
Kaali	8	Drama	13 November 2018	Bengali	
B.Tech	9	Comedy	15 November 2018	Telugu	
Alarm	12	Action	22 November 2018	Tamil	
Date With Saie	9	Drama	5 December 2018	Marathi	
What's Up Velakkari	12	Drama	13 December 2018	Tamil	
Rangbaaz	9	Drama	22 December 2018	Hindi	

== 2019 ==
Title	Episodes	Genre	Premiere	Language	Ref.
Ekkadiki Ee Parugu	6	Drama, Mystery, Thriller	8 January 2019	Telugu	
Parchhayee: Ghost Stories by Ruskin Bond	12	Horror	15 January 2019	Hindi	
Mitta	7	Drama	23 January 2019	Tamil	
D7	8	Drama	6 February 2019	Tamil	
Ekkadiki Ee Parugu (season 2)	6	Drama, Thriller	8 February 2019	Telugu	
Sharate Aaj	6	Drama	21 February 2019	Bengali	
Horn Ok Please	12	Drama	22 February 2019	Marathi	
The Final Call	8	Thriller	22 February 2019	Hindi	
Sex Drugs and Theatre	10	Drama	5 March 2019	Marathi	
Mrs. Subbalakshmi	10	Comedy	8 March 2019	Telugu	
Abhay (season 1)	8	Thriller	20 March 2019	Hindi	
Karenjit Kaur - The Untold Story of Sunny Leone (season 3)	4	Drama	5 April 2019	Hindi	
Poison	11	Crime, Drama, Thriller	19 April 2019	Hindi	
Auto Shankar	10	Thriller	23 April 2019	Tamil	
High Priestess	8	Drama	25 April 2019	Telugu	
Hutatma (season 1)	7	Drama	1 May 2019	Marathi	
Bhoot Purva	10	Drama, Comedy	7 May 2019	Hindi	
Thiravam	7	Drama	21 May 2019	Tamil	
Skyfire	8	Drama	22 May 2019	Hindi	
Water Bottle	4	Drama	11 June 2019	Bengali	
Kaafir	8	Drama	15 June 2019	Hindi	
Postman	10	Drama	27 June 2019	Tamil	
Comedy shots	8	Comedy	28 June 2019	Hindi	
Hutatma (season 2)	7	Drama	1 July 2019	Marathi	
Kailasapuram	6	Drama	2 July 2019	Telugu	
Ishq Aaj Kal (season 1)	8	Drama	4 July 2019	Hindi	
NERD: Neither Either Really Dead	7	Drama	5 July 2019	Telugu	
Bombers	6	Drama, Sports	14 July 2019	Hindi	
REJCTX (season 1)	10	Mystery, Thriller	25 July 2019	Hindi	
Madras Meter Show	6	Comedy, Reality	29 July 2019	Tamil	
Ishq Aaj Kal (season 2)	8	Drama	2 August 2019	Hindi	
Gondya Ala Re	10	Action	15 August 2019	Marathi	
Fingertip	5	Crime, Thriller	21 August 2019	Tamil	
Coldd Lassi Aur Chicken Masala	12	Drama	3 September 2019	Hindi	
Ishq Aaj Kal (season 3)	8	Drama	6 September 2019	Hindi	
Jamai 2.0 (season 1)	10	Drama	10 September 2019	Hindi	
Mission Over Mars	8	Drama	10 September 2019	Hindi	
Krishanu Krishanu	11	Biopic	16 September 2019	Bengali	
The Verdict - State vs Nanavati	10	Court room drama	30 September 2019	Hindi	
G.O.D. - Gods Of Dharmapuri	10	Crime, Thriller	1 October 2019	Telugu	
Kaale Dhande	8	Comedy	2 October 2019	Marathi	
Fixerr	15	Action, Drama	7 October 2019	Hindi	
Fittrat	15	Romance	18 October 2019	Hindi	
Nisha	9	Thriller	18 October 2019	Tamil	
Bhram	8	Thriller, Horror	24 October 2019	Hindi	
Ishq Aaj Kal (season 4)	8	Drama	30 October 2019	Hindi	
Police Diary 2.0	20	Crime, Drama	8 November 2019	Tamil	
Virgin Bhasskar	11	Erotic Comedy	19 November 2019	Hindi	
Hawala	6	Thriller	21 November 2019	Telugu	
Broken But Beautiful (season 2)	10	Romance, Drama	27 November 2019	Hindi	
Karoline Kamakshi	10	Comedy, Action	1 December 2019	Tamil	
Hum Tum and Them	15	Drama	6 December 2019	Hindi	
Three Half Bottles	7	Romance, Comedy	15 December 2019	Telugu; Hindi	
Ragini MMS: Returns (season 1 and 2)	27	Horror	18 December 2019	Hindi	
Rangbaaz (season 2)	9	Drama	20 December 2019	Hindi	

== 2020 ==
Title	Episodes	Genre	Premiere	Language	Ref.
The Chargesheet: Innocent or Guilty?	8	Drama	7 January 2020	Hindi	
Karkat Rogue	8	Drama	10 January 2020	Bengali; Hindi	
Code M (season 1)	8	Mystery	15 January 2020	Hindi	
Never Kiss Your Best Friend (season 1)	10	Drama	20 January 2020	Hindi	
Anaganaga	9	Drama	23 January 2020	Telugu	
Judgement Day	10	Drama	2 February 2020	Bengali; Hindi	
XXX (season 1 and 2)	11	Erotic, Romance, Drama	8 February 2020	Hindi	
Topless	6	Comedy, Action	11 February 2020	Tamil	
Chadarangam	9	Political Thriller	20 February 2020	Telugu	
It Happened In Calcutta	10	Romance	29 February 2020	Hindi	
Mentalhood	10	Drama	11 March 2020	Hindi	
Kannamoochi	5	Horror, Thriller	13 March 2020	Tamil	
Amrutham Dhvitheeyam	26	Comedy	25 March 2020	Telugu	
State of Siege 26/11	8	Thriller, Drama	20 March 2020	Hindi	
Who's Your Daddy (season 1)	12	Drama, Comedy	2 April 2020	Hindi	
Baarish (season 1 and 2)	40	Romance, Drama	6 May 2020	Hindi	
REJCTX (season 2)	8	Mystery, Thriller	14 May 2020	Hindi	
Loser	10	Sports, Drama	20 May 2020	Telugu	
Bhalla Calling Bhalla	12	Comedy	20 May 2020	Hindi	
Kaali (season 2)	8	Action, Thriller	29 May 2020	Hindi; Bengali	
Kehne Ko Humsafar Hain (season 3)	19	Drama	6 June 2020	Hindi	
The Casino	10	Crime, Action	12 June 2020	Hindi	
Sathya - Lockdown Special (season 1)	13	Comedy, Romance	15 June 2020	Tamil	
Never Kiss Your Best Friend (season 2)	10	Romance	18 June 2020	Hindi	
Lalbazaar	10	Crime	19 June 2020	Bengali	
Mafia	8	Action, Thriller	10 July 2020	Hindi	
Churails	10	Crime Thriller	11 August 2020	Urdu	
Abhay (season 2)	8	Action, Thriller	14 August 2020	Hindi	
Bhanwar (web series)	8	Sci-fi Thriller	18 August 2020	Hindi	
Virgin Bhasskar (season 2)	12	Erotic Comedy	29 August 2020	Hindi	
Bebaakee	31	Drama	30 August 2020	Hindi	
Forbidden Love	4	Romance, Thriller	25 September 2020	Hindi	
Expiry Date	10	Crime, Thriller	2 October 2020	Telugu; Hindi	
Gandii Baat (season 4 and 5)	9	Erotic, Drama	8 October 2020	Hindi	
Poison 2	11	Crime, Drama, Thriller	16 October 2020	Hindi	
Thanthu Vitten Ennai	25	Drama, Comedy	23 October 2020	Tamil	
Taish	6	Thriller	29 October 2020	Hindi	
Mugilan	8	Crime, Action, Thriller	30 October 2020	Tamil	
Ek Jhoothi Love Story	18	Drama, Romance	30 October 2020	Urdu	
Mum Bhai	12	Drama	12 November 2020	Hindi	
Bicchoo Ka Khel	9	Action, Drama	18 November 2020	Hindi	
Dark 7 White	10	Crime, Drama	24 November 2020	Hindi	
PubGoa	8	Crime, Sci-fi	27 November 2020	Tamil	
Naxalbari	9	Crime, Thriller	28 November 2020	Hindi	
Black Widows	12	Comedy, Thriller	18 December 2020	Hindi	
Singa Penne	25	Drama, Romance	22 December 2020	Tamil	
Who's Your Daddy (season 2)	11	Drama, Comedy	22 December 2020	Hindi	
Shoot-out At Alair	8	Crime, Action	25 December 2020	Telugu	
Paurashpur	7	Periodic, Drama	29 December 2020	Hindi	

== 2021 ==
Title	Episodes	Genre	Premiere	Language	Country	Ref.
Jeet Ki Zid	7	Drama, Action	22 January 2021	Hindi	India	
Bang Baang	10	Action, Thriller	25 January 2021	Hindi	India	
LSD - Love, Scandal & Doctors	15	Mystery, Thriller	5 February 2021	Hindi	India	
Crashh	10	Siblings Drama	14 February 2021	Hindi	India	
Dev DD 2	17	Drama, Romance	20 February 2021	Hindi	India	
Jamai 2.0 (season 2)	10	Drama	26 February 2021	Hindi	India	
The Married Woman	11	Drama	8 March 2021	Hindi	India	
Qubool Hai 2.0	10	Drama	12 March 2021	Hindi, Urdu	India	
Contract	6	Drama, Thriller	18 March 2021	Bengali	Bangladesh	
Mai Hero Boll Raha Hu	13	Crime, Thriller	20 April 2021	Hindi	India	
Sunflower	8	Crime, Thriller	11 June 2021	Hindi	India	
Dhoop Ki Deewar	10	Social, Tragedy	25 June 2021	Urdu	Pakistan	
LOL Salaam	6	Comedy, Adventure	25 June 2021	Telugu	India	
Bittan : Tumhara Time Aayega!	TBA	Romantic, Comedy	TBA	Hindi	India	
Gogo Family Aur woh	TBA	Comedy	TBA	Hindi	India	
Ladies & Gentleman	8	Drama, Thriller	9 July 2021	Bengali	Bangladesh	
Pavitra Rishta-Its Never too Late	8	Drama, Romance	15 September 2021	Hindi	India	
Break Point	7	Documentary	1 October 2021	Hindi	India	
E Emon Porichoy	20	Drama, Thriller	27 October 2021	Bengali	Bangladesh	
Oka Chinna Family Story	5	Comedy, Drama	19 November 2021	Telugu	India	
Qatil Haseenaon Ke Naam	6	Crime fiction, Drama	19 November 2021	Urdu	Pakistan	

== 2022 ==
Title	Episodes	Genre	Premiere	Language	Country	Ref.
Kaun Banegi Shikharwati	10	Comedy, Drama	7 January 2022	Hindi	India	
Mukti	9	Period, Drama	26 January 2022	Bengali	India	
Vilangu	7	Crime, Thriller	18 February 2022	Tamil	India	
Mithya	6	Period, Drama	18 February 2022	Hindi	India	
Sutliyan	8	Family drama	4 March 2022	Hindi	India	
Gaalivaana	7	Crime, Mystery	14 March 2022	Telugu	India	
Anantham	8	Family drama	22 April 2022	Tamil	India	
Pyar Ka Pehla Naam: Radha Mohan	98	Romantic drama	2 May 2022	Hindi	India	
The Broken News	8	Drama, Thriller	10 June 2022	Hindi	India	
Recce	7	Crime, Thriller	17 June 2022	Telugu	India	
Saas Bahu Achaar Pvt. Ltd.	6	Family drama	8 July 2022	Hindi	India	
Maa Neella Tank	8	Comedy, Drama	15 July 2022	Telugu	India	
Duranga	9	Crime Thriller	19 August 2022	Hindi	India	
Hello World	8	Comedy	12 August 2022	Hindi	Telugu	India
TVF Tripling (Season 3)	5	Comedy	21 October 2022	Hindi	India	
Mukhbir The Story of a Spy	8	Espionage drama	11 November 2022	Hindi	India	
Five Six Seven Eight	8	Dance, Drama	18 November 2022	Tamil	India	
Aha Naa Pellanta	8	Comedy, Romantic drama	17 November 2022	Telugu	India	
Pitchers Season 2	8	Comedy, Drama	23 December 2022	Hindi	India	

== 2023 ==
Title	Episodes	Genre	Premiere	Language	Country	Ref.
Shikarpur	9	Thriller, Comedy	6 January 2023	Bengali	India	
ATM	8	Crime, Heist, Thriller	20 January 2023	Telugu	India	
Jaanbaaz Hindustan Ke	8	Action, Thriller	26 January 2023	Hindi	India	
Ayali	8	Action, Thriller	26 January 2023	Tamil	India	
Roktokorobi	11	Thriller, Drama	3 February 2023	Bengali	India	
Puli Meka	8	Crime, Thriller	23 February 2023	Telugu	India	
Shwetkali	8	Thriller, Drama	24 February 2023	Bengali	India	
Taj: Divided by Blood	18	Historical	3 March 2023	Hindi	India	
United Kacche	8	Slice of life	24 March 2023	Hindi	India	
Fireflies: Parth Aur Jugnu	8	Fantasy	5 May 2023	Hindi	India	
Vyavastha	8	Legal drama	28 April 2023	Telugu	India	
Maya Bazaar For Sale	7	comedy drama	14 July 2023	Telugu	India	
The Kashmir Files: Unreported	7	documentary series	11 Aug 2023	Hindi	India	
Abar Proloy	10	Crime drama	11 Aug, 2023	Bengali	India	
Chhotolok	9	crime thriller	3 Nov 2023	Bengali	India	
Koose Munisamy Veerappan	6	True crime docuseries,	Dec 14, 2023	Tamil,	India	

== 2024 ==
Title	Episodes	Genre	Premiere	Language	Country	Ref.
Paashbalish	7	Romantic, Thriller	10 May 2024	Bengali	India	
Thalaimai Seyalagam	8	Political Thriller	17 May 2024	Tamil	India	
Paruvu	8	Crime, Thriller	14 June 2024	Telugu	India	
Bahishkarana	6	Drama	19 July 2024	Telugu	India	
Gyaarah Gyaarah	8	Suspense, thriller	9 August 2024	Hindi	India	
Manorathangal	9	Anthology	15 August 2024	Malayalam	India	
Kaantaye Kaantaye	10	Suspense, thriller	15 August 2024	Bengali	India	
Murshid	7	Crime thriller	15 August 2024	Hindi	India	
Mithya: The Darker Chapter	6	Period, Drama	1 November 2024	Hindi	India	

== 2025 ==
Title	Episodes	Genre	Premiere	Language	Country	Ref.
Crime Beat	8	Crime, Thriller	21 February 2025	Hindi	India	
Ayyana Mane	6	Crime, Thriller	25 February 2025	Kannada	India	
Andhar Maya	7	Mystery, Thriller, Horror	30 May 2025	Marathi	India	
Chhal Kapat	7	Mystery, Thriller	6 June 2025	Hindi	India	
Viraatapalem	8	Supernatural thriller	27 June 2025	Telugu	India	
Bibhishon	7	Psychological thriller	27 June 2025	Bengali	India	
Bakaiti	7	Comedy, Drama	1 August 2025	Hindi	India	
Mothevari Love Story	7	Romantic comedy, Drama	8 August 2025	Telugu	India	
Jayammu Nischayammu Raa with Jagapathi	18	Talk show	15 August 2025	Telugu	India	
Shodha	6	Suspense crime thriller	29 August 2025	Kannada	India	
Kammattam	6	Crime Thriller	5 September 2025	Malayalam	India	
Janaawar – The Beast Within	7	crime thriller	26 September 2025	Hindi	India	
Veduvan	7	Crime Thriller	10 October 2025	Tamil	India	
D/o Prasad Rao: Kanabadutaledu	7	Suspense thriller	31 October 2025	Telugu	India	
Ganoshotru	5	Crime Thriller	31 October 2025	Bengali	India	
Baai Tujhyapayi		Drama	31 October 2025	Marathi	India	
Maarigallu	7	Supernatural Folklore Thriller	31 October 2025	Kannada	India	
Thode Door Thode Paas	5	Comedy Drama	7 November 2025	Hindi	India	
Inspection Bungalow	7	Horror Comedy	14 November 2025	Malayalam	India	
Be Dune Teen		Family dramedy	5 December 2025	Marathi	India	
Heartiley Battery	6	Romantic science fiction	16 December 2025	Tamil	India	
Chote Tara ka Bada Gadar		Animation	24 December 2025	Hindi	India	

== 2026 ==
Title	Episodes	Genre	Premiere	Language	Country	Ref.
Kaalipotka	7	Action, Thriller	23 January 2026	Bengali	India	
Abar Proloy 2	8	Action, Thriller, Crime	28 February 2026	Bengali	India	
Andha Pyaar 2.0	7	Realty, dating	14 March 2026	Hindi	India	
Kasaragod Embassy	7	Crime, Thriller	20 March 2026	Malayalam	India	
Kaakee Circus	7	Comedy, Thriller	10 April 2026	Tamil	India	
Detective Dhananjay: Rahasyajaal	7	Crime, Thriller	1 May 2026	Marathi	India	
Hathras – 16 Days	3	docu drama	15 May 2026	Hindi	India	
Satrangi: Badle Ka Khel	7	crime drama	22 May 2026	Hindi	India	
Brown	7	Crime Thriller	5 June 2026	Hindi	India	
Taarkata	7	Action, Thriller	12 June 2026	Bengali	India	
Muthassi	6	Horror, Thriller	3 July 2026	Malayalam	India	
Shivlok Ke Kundakka-Mandakka	10	Animated series	17 July 2026	Hindi	India	
Prem Shots	6	Romcom, Drama, Romance	24 July 2026	Bengali	India	
Bakaiti	14	Family Dramedy	25 September 2026	Hindi	India	
Kon Yashwant Pansare?	7	Courtroom Drama	16 October 2026	Marathi	India	
Shwetkali 2	7	Thriller, Drama	23 October 2026	Bengali	India	
Rudravanam PS	7	Crime Thriller	30 October 2026	Telugu	India	
Octopus (2026)	7	Suspense Thriller	27 November 2026	Tamil	India	
Teen Tigada	50	Romance	20 November 2026	Hindi	India	

== See also ==
- List of Amazon India originals
- List of JioHotstar original films
- List of JioHotstar original programming
- List of SonyLIV original programming
- List of Netflix India original programming
