= Rudravanam PS =

Indian web series

- Official poster
- Genre: Crime thriller
- Directed by: Sasidhar Munnangi
- Starring: Naresh Agastya; Banerjee
- Country of origin: India
- Original language: Telugu
- No. of seasons: 1
- No. of episodes: 7 (list of episodes)

Production
- Producers: Dr. Surya Kanthi; Kuchibhotla; Ramesh Puppala
- Cinematography: Ashkar Ali
- Editor: Gullapalli Madhav Kumar

Original release
- Network: Zee5
- Release: 30 October 2026

Rudravanam PS is a 2026 Indian Telugu-language crime thriller streaming television series produced as an Original for Telugu Zee 5 , directed by Sasidhar Munnangi and stars Naresh Agastya as Sub-Inspector Sivakumar and is scheduled to premiere on Zee 5 on 30 October 2026. The series also features along with Banerjee, Shiva Alapati, Sugali Siloni and Shravani Reddy.

== Synopsis ==
The series follows SI Sivakumar, an honest police officer investigating a disturbing case in the village of Rudravanam after a man goes missing and a headless corpse is discovered. The investigation expands into a larger mystery involving multiple killings, a reported theft of gold worth ₹25 lakh, and hidden connections between crime, power, and prejudice.

== Cast ==
- Naresh Agastya as SI Sivakumar
- Banerjee as CI Venugopal
- Shiva Alapati as ASI Madhav
- Sugali Siloni as ASI Nirmala
- Ramesh Konambhotla as Head Constable Sundar
- Narayana Swamy
- Shravani Reddy
- Charu Wakanas
- Preetei Sundar

== Production ==
Rudravanam PS is directed by Sasidhar Munnangi and written by Taj Sayyad. It is produced by Dr. Surya Kanthi Kuchibhotla and Ramesh Puppala, with Ashkar Ali handling cinematography and Madhav serving as editor. This seven-episode series is reported to be a remake of Tamil series Vilangu.

== Reception ==
Rudravanam P.S. premiered on Zee 5 on October 30, 2026, receiving generally mixed-to-positive reviews from critics. Reviewers praised its intriguing small-town investigation setup, compact episode runtimes, and Naresh Agastya's lead performance, though some noted that the series suffered from predictable writing and a less impactful resolution in its final act.

TV9 Telugu commended director Sasidhar Munnangi for opting for short, focused episodes rather than dragging out the runtime, noting that the first five episodes successfully kept viewers hooked with tight suspense and interconnected cases. However, the review pointed out that the writing stumbled in the final two episodes, where the motive and subplots felt weak and predictable. Filmibeat commented that the show paced well enough to be binged. ABP Live criticised the movie for its slow pace and sloppy screenplay, rating it 2.5 out of 5.

== Also Read ==
- Bibhishon
- Janaawar – The Beast Within
- Raakshasa
- Vilangu
