= List of Amazon India originals =

Beginning in 2013, Amazon started distributing original content (series, films, etc.) through its Prime Video service, some of which are developed by in-house Amazon MGM Studios. This article gives a list of Amazon's originals for India.

== Television ==
=== Drama ===
Title	Genre	Premiere	Seasons	Language	Status
Inside Edge (Note: These shows are also available with dubbing in other languages of India and English.)	Sports drama	10 July 2017	3 seasons, 30 episodes	Hindi	Renewed
Laakhon Mein Ek	Drama	13 October 2017	2 seasons, 14 episodes	Hindi	Ended
Breathe (Note: These shows are also available with dubbing in other languages of India.)	Thriller	26 January 2018	1 season, 8 episodes	Hindi / Tamil	Ended
Gangstars	Crime-drama	1 June 2018	1 season, 12 episodes	Telugu	Ended
Mirzapur	Crime thriller	16 November 2018	3 season, 29 episodes	Hindi	Renewed
Vella Raja	Crime-drama	7 December 2018	1 season, 10 episodes	Tamil	Ended
Made in Heaven	Drama	7 March 2019	2 season, 16 episodes	Hindi	Renewed
The Family Man (Note: These shows are also available with dubbing in other languages of India, English, Spanish, German, French, Italian, Japanese and Portuguese.)	Thriller	20 September 2019	2 seasons, 19 episodes	Hindi	Renewed
The Forgotten Army	Historical drama	24 January 2020	5 episodes	Hindi	Ended
Paatal Lok	Crime thriller	15 May 2020	2 season, 17 episodes	Hindi	Renewed
Breathe: Into the Shadows	Crime thriller	10 July 2020	2 season, 20 episodes	Hindi	Renewed
Bandish Bandits	Musical	4 August 2020	2 season, 18 episodes	Hindi	Pending
Tandav	Political drama	15 January 2021	1 season, 9 episodes	Hindi	Ended
The Last Hour	Crime thriller	14 May 2021	1 season, 8 episodes	Hindi	Ended
Mumbai Diaries 26/11	Thriller	9 September 2021	2 season, 16 episodes	Hindi	Ended
Akkad Bakkad Rafu Chakkar	Crime drama	3 November 2021	1 season, 10 episodes	Hindi	Ended
Putham Pudhu Kaalai Vidiyaadhaa	Anthology	14 January 2022	1 season, 5 episodes	Tamil	Ended
Unpaused: Naya Safar	Anthology	21 January 2022	1 season, 5 episodes	Hindi	Ended
Bestseller	Drama	18 February 2022	1 season, 8 episodes	Hindi	Ended
Guilty Minds	Legal Drama	22 April 2022	1 season, 10 episodes	Hindi	Ended
Modern Love Mumbai	Anthology	13 May 2022	1 season, 6 episodes	Hindi	Ended
Suzhal: The Vortex	Thriller	17 June 2022	2 season, 16 episodes	Tamil	Ended
Modern Love Hyderabad	Anthology	8 July 2022	1 season, 6 episodes	Telugu	Ended
Crash Course	Drama	5 August 2022	1 season, 10 episodes	Hindi	Ended
Hush Hush	Thriller	23 September 2022	1 season, 7 episodes	Hindi	Ended
Vadhandhi: The Fable of Velonie	Thriller	2 December 2022	2 seasons, 16 episodes	Tamil	Ended
Farzi	Black comedy crime thriller	10 February 2023	1 season, 8 episodes	Hindi	Pending
Jubilee	Historical Drama	7 April 2023	1 season, 10 episodes	Hindi	Pending
Dahaad	Crime drama	12 May 2023	1 season, 8 episodes	Hindi	Ended
Modern Love Chennai	Anthology	18 May 2023	1 season, 6 episodes	Tamil	Ended
Jee Karda	Romantic Drama	15 June 2023	1 season, 8 episodes	Hindi	Ended
Sweet Kaaram Coffee	Drama	6 July 2023	1 season, 8 episodes	Tamil	Ended
Adhura	Supernatural Thriller	7 July 2023	1 season, 7 episodes	Hindi	Ended
Bambai Meri Jaan	Crime thriller	14 September 2023	1 season, 10 episodes	Hindi	Ended
P I Meena	Thriller	3 November 2023	1 season, 8 episodes	Hindi	Ended
The Village	Horror	24 November 2023	1 season, 6 episodes	Tamil	Pending
Shehar Lakhot	Thriller	30 November 2023	1 season, 8 episodes	Hindi	Ended
Dhootha	Horror mystery thriller	1 December 2023	1 season, 8 episodes	Telugu	Renewed
Vyooham	Action thriller	14 December 2023	1 season, 8 episodes	Telugu	Ended
Indian Police Force	Action	19 January 2024	1 season, 7 episodes	Hindi	Pending
Poacher	Crime-drama	23 February 2024	1 season, 8 episodes	Malayalam	Ended
Big Girls Don't Cry	Drama	14 March 2024	1 season, 7 episodes	English	Ended
Inspector Rishi	Horror	29 March 2024	1 season, 10 episodes	Tamil	Pending
Dil Dosti Dilemma	Romantic comedy	25 April 2024	1 season, 7 episodes	Hindi	Ended
Call Me Bae	Romantic	6 September 2024	1 season, 8 episodes	Hindi	Renewed
Snakes and Ladders	Crime drama	18 October 2024	1 season, 9 episodes	Tamil	Pending
Citadel: Honey Bunny	Spy action thriller	7 November 2024	1 season, 6 episodes	Hindi	Ended
Waack Girls	Comedy drama	22 November 2024	1 season, 9 episodes	Hindi	Pending
Khauf	Horror	18 April 2025	1 season, 8 episodes	Hindi	Pending
Rangeen	Drama	25 July 2025	1 season, 9 episodes	Hindi	Pending
Arabia Kadali	Survival drama	8 August 2025	1 season, 8 episodes	Telugu	Ended
Andhera	Horror	14 August 2025	1 season, 8 episodes	Hindi	Pending
Do You Wanna Partner	Comedy drama	12 September 2025	1 season, 8 episodes	Hindi	Pending
Daldal	Crime thriller	30 January 2026	1 season, 7 episodes	Hindi	Pending
Matka King	Drama	17 April 2026	1 season, 8 episodes	Hindi	Pending
Lukkhe	Musical Action drama	8 May 2026	1 season, 8 episodes	Hindi	pending
Exam	Investigative socio thriller	15 May 2026	1 season, 7 episodes	Tamil	pending
Raakh	crime thriller	12 June 2026	1 season, 8 episodes	Hindi	pending
Isakapatnam	Period thriller	2 July 2026	1 season, 7 episodes	Telugu	pending
Jagame Sangeetham	Musical drama	4 September 2026	1 season, 8 episodes	Telugu	pending
The Revolutionaries	Historical drama	11 September 2026	1 season, 8 episodes	Hindi	pending
Chaar Yaar	Crime drama	23 October 2026	1 season, 8 episodes	Hindi	pending
Awaiting release
India Love Project	Romantic	TBA	TBA	Hindi	
Gangs Kuruthi Punal	Crime drama	TBA	TBA	Tamil	

=== Comedy ===
Title	Genre	Premiere	Seasons	Language	Status
Pushpavalli	Comedy drama	15 December 2017	2 seasons, 16 episodes	Hindi	Ended
Shaitaan Haveli	Horror comedy	5 January 2018	1 season, 8 episodes	Hindi	Ended
Chacha Vidhayak Hain Humare	Comedy	18 May 2018	2 season, 16 episodes	Hindi	Renewed
Four More Shots Please!	Romantic comedy-drama	25 January 2019	4 seasons, 37 episodes	Hindi	Pending
Mind the Malhotras	Sitcom	7 June 2019	2 season, 19 episodes	Hindi	Ended
Hostel Daze	Comedy drama	13 December 2019	4 season, 21 episodes	Hindi	Ended
Afsos	Comedy drama	6 February 2020	1 season, 8 episodes	Hindi	Ended
Panchayat	Comedy drama	3 April 2020	4 season, 32 episodes	Hindi	Renewed
Rasbhari	Comedy drama	25 June 2020	1 season, 8 episodes	Hindi	Ended
Time Enna Boss	Sci-fi / Comedy drama	18 September 2020	1 season, 10 episodes	Tamil	Ended
Kumari Srimathi	Comedy drama	28 September 2023	1 season, 7 episodes	Telugu	Ended
Happy Family: Conditions Apply	comedy	10 March 2023	1 season, 10 episodes	Hindi	Ended
Thalaivettiyaan Paalayam	Comedy drama	20 September 2024	1 season, 8 episodes	Tamil	Pending
Sivarapalli	Comedy drama	24 January 2025	1 season, 8 episodes	Telugu	Pending
Dupahiya	Comedy drama	7 March 2025	1 season, 9 episodes	Hindi	Renwed
Gram Chikitsalay	Comedy	9 May 2025	2 season, 10 episodes	Hindi	Renwed
Bandwaale	Comedy	13 February 2026	1 season, 8 episodes	Hindi	Pending
Maa Ka Sum	comedy drama	3 April 2026	1 season, 8 episodes	Hindi	Pending
The Pyramid Scheme	Comedy drama	5 June 2026	1 season, 7 episodes	Hindi	Pending
Adarsh Baal Vidyalaya	Comedy drama	24 July 2026	1 season, 7 episodes	Hindi	Pending
Awaiting release

==== Reality ====
Title	Genre	Premiere	Seasons	Length	Language(s)	Status
The Traitors	Reality competition / Game show	12 June 2025	2 seasons	75+ min	Hindi, English	Ongoing / Renewed for Season 2
The Alliance	Reality competition / Game show	26 June 2026	1 season	pending	Hindi	Ongoing

=== Animation ===
Title	Genre	Premiere	Seasons	Language	Status
Kalari Kids	Adventure	15 April 2017	3 seasons, 60 episodes	Hindi	Ended
Baahubali: The Lost Legends	Action/Historical fiction	19 April 2017	2 seasons, 104 episodes	Hindi/Telugu/Tamil	Pending
Selfie With Bajrangi	Action comedy	16 April 2018	2 seasons, 14 episodes	Hindi	Moved to Hotstar
Inspector Chingum	Action comedy	4 May 2018	2 seasons, 54 episodes	Hindi	Ended

=== Documentary ===
Title	Genre	Premiere	Seasons	Language	Status
Sons of the Soil: Jaipur Pink Panthers	Sports docuseries	4 December 2020	1 season, 5 episodes	Hindi	Ended
Cinema Marte Dum Tak	Docuseries	20 January 2023	1 season, 6 episodes	Hindi	Ended
Dancing on the Grave	True crime	21 April 2023	1 season, 4 episodes	Hindi	Ended
AP Dhillon: First of A Kind	Biographical docuseries	18 August 2023	1 season, 4 episodes	English	Ended
Rainbow Rishta	Queer docuseries	7 November 2023	1 season, 6 episodes	English	Ended
First Act	Docuseries	15 December 2023	1 season, 6 episodes	Hindi	Ended
Love Storiyaan	Docuseries	14 February 2024	1 season, 6 episodes	Hindi	Ended
Angry Young Men	Docuseries	20 August 2024		Hindi	Ended

=== Variety ===
Title	Genre	Premiere	Seasons/episodes	Language	Status
The Remix	Music competition	9 March 2018	1 season, 10 episodes	Hindi	Ended
Comicstaan	Comedy competition	13 July 2018	2 seasons, 17 episodes	Hindi	Pending
Hear Me Love Me	Dating game show	28 September 2018	1 season, 10 episodes	Hindi	Ended
Skulls and Roses	Reality competition	29 August 2019	1 season, 10 episodes	Hindi	Ended
Jestination Unknown	Travel documentary	18 October 2019	1 season, 6 episodes	Hindi	Ended
One Mic Stand	Stand-up comedy	14 November 2019	1 season, 5 episodes	Hindi	Ended
Follow Kar Lo Yaar	Reality television	23 August 2024	1 season, 9 episodes	Hindi	Pending
The Tribe	Reality television	4 October 2024	1 season, 9 episodes	Hindi	Pending
The Rana Daggubati Show	Talk show	23 November 2024	1 season, 8 episodes	Telugu	Pending
Two Much with Kajol and Twinkle	Talk show	25 September 2025	1 season, 11 episodes	Hindi	Pending

=== Continuations ===
Title	Genre	Prev. network(s)	Premiere	Seasons	Language	Status
Sapne Vs Everyone	Drama	YouTube	8 December 2023	2 seasons	Hindi	pending

== Film ==
The following films was released under Amazon Original Movie or (in case for skipping theatrical releases) Amazon Presents.

Title	Genre	Premiere	Runtime	Language(s)
Ponmagal Vandhal	Legal drama	29 May 2020	123 minutes	Tamil
Gulabo Sitabo	Comedy	12 June 2020	124 minutes	Hindi
Penguin	Thriller	19 June 2020	132 minutes	Telugu/Tamil
Fourth River	Drama	28 June 2020	119 minutes	Malayalam
Sufiyum Sujatayum	Romantic drama	3 July 2020	122 minutes	Malayalam
Law	Legal drama	17 July 2020	120 minutes	Kannada
French Biryani	Comedy drama	24 July 2020	116 minutes	Kannada
Shakuntala Devi	Biographical	31 July 2020	127 minutes	Hindi
C U Soon	Thriller	1 September 2020	98 minutes	Malayalam
V	Action thriller	5 September 2020	140 minutes	Telugu
Nishabdham	Thriller	2 October 2020	125 minutes	Telugu/Tamil
Halal Love Story	Comedy	15 October 2020	116 minutes	Malayalam
Putham Pudhu Kaalai	Anthology	16 October 2020	129 minutes	Tamil
Bheemasena Nalamaharaja	Drama	29 October 2020	140 minutes	Kannada
Gatham	Thriller	6 November 2020	101 minutes	Telugu
Soorarai Pottru	Drama	12 November 2020	142 minutes	Tamil
Chhalaang	Sport	13 November 2020	136 minutes	Hindi
Middle Class Melodies	Romantic drama	20 November 2020	135 minutes	Telugu
Mane Number 13	Horror	26 November 2020	106 minutes	Kannada/Tamil
Bombhaat	Science fiction	3 December 2020	132 minutes	Telugu
IIT Krishnamurthy	Thriller	10 December 2020	110 minutes	Telugu
Durgamati	Horror-thriller	11 December 2020	155 minutes	Hindi
Guvva Gorinka	Romantic drama	17 December 2020	117 minutes	Telugu
Unpaused	Anthology	18 December 2020	113 minutes	Hindi
Coolie No. 1	Comedy	25 December 2020	134 minutes	Hindi
Maara	Romantic drama	8 January 2021	149 minutes	Tamil
Drishyam 2	Thriller	19 February 2021	153 minutes	Malayalam
Picasso	Drama	19 March 2021	73 minutes	Marathi
Joji	Drama/Thriller	7 April 2021	113 minutes	Malayalam
Hello Charlie	Comedy	9 April 2021	102 minutes	Hindi
Well Done Baby	Family drama	9 April 2021	99 minutes	Marathi
Aarkkariyam	Comedy-thriller	19 May 2021	112 minutes	Malayalam
Ek Mini Katha	Comedy	27 May 2021	134 minutes	Telugu
Pachchis	Thriller	12 June 2021	127 minutes	Telugu
Sherni	Drama/Thriller	18 June 2021	130 minutes	Hindi
Cold Case	Horror-thriller	30 June 2021	139 minutes	Malayalam
Sara's	Comedy	5 July 2021	118 minutes	Malayalam
Malik	Action	15 July 2021	161 minutes	Malayalam
Toofaan	Sports drama	16 July 2021	161 minutes	Hindi
Narappa	Action drama	20 July 2021	153 minutes	Telugu
Ikkat	Comedy	21 July 2021	125 minutes	Kannada
Sarpatta Parambarai	Sports drama	22 July 2021	173 minutes	Tamil
Kuruthi	Action-thriller	11 August 2021	122 minutes	Malayalam
Shershaah	Biographical	12 August 2021	135 minutes	Hindi
Home	Comedy drama	19 August 2021	161 minutes	Malayalam
Tuck Jagadish	Action drama	10 September 2021	145 minutes	Telugu
Sunny	Drama	23 September 2021	93 minutes	Malayalam
Raame Aandalum Raavane Aandalum	Drama	24 September 2021	112 minutes	Tamil
Bhramam	Black comedy crime thriller	7 October 2021	152 minutes	Malayalam
Udanpirappe	Family drama	14 October 2021	137 minutes	Tamil
Sardar Udham	Biographical	16 October 2021	162 minutes	Hindi
Rathnan Prapancha	Comedy drama	22 October 2021	147 minutes	Kannada
Dybbuk	Supernatural horror thriller	29 October 2021	112 minutes	Hindi
Jai Bhim	Legal drama	2 November 2021	164 minutes	Tamil
Jivan Sandhya	Romantic drama	9 November 2021	137 minutes	Marathi
Dhummas	Thriller drama	23 November 2021	106 minutes	Gujarati
Drushyam 2	Thriller drama	25 November 2021	153 minutes	Telugu
Chhorii	Supernatural horror thriller	26 November 2021	126 minutes	Hindi
Bali	Horror	9 December 2021	103 minutes	Marathi
One Cut Two Cut	Comedy	3 February 2022	89 minutes	Kannada
Mahaan	Action-thriller	10 February 2022	162 minutes	Tamil
Gehraiyaan	Romantic drama	11 February 2022	148 minutes	Hindi
Family Pack	Comedy	17 February 2022	110 minutes	Kannada
Jalsa	Social drama	18 March 2022	126 minutes	Hindi
Achcham Madam Naanam Payirppu	Adult drama	25 March 2022	122 minutes	Tamil
Sharmaji Namkeen	Drama	31 March 2022	119 minutes	Hindi
Oh My Dog	Drama	21 April 2022	121 minutes	Tamil
Saani Kaayidham	Crime drama	6 May 2022	137 minutes	Tamil
Maja Ma	Drama	6 October 2022	134 minutes	Hindi
Ammu	Thriller drama	19 October 2022	136 minutes	Telugu
Tiku Weds Sheru	Romantic Comedy	23 June 2023	111 minutes	Hindi
Bawaal	Drama	21 July 2023	137 minutes	Hindi
Pippa	Historical War film	12 November 2023	139 minutes	Hindi
Mast Mein Rehne Ka	Comedy	8 December 2023	127 minutes	Hindi
Dry Day	Comedy	22 December 2023	128 minutes	Hindi
Ae Watan Mere Watan	Historical drama	21 March 2024	133 minutes	Hindi
Sharmajee Ki Beti	Comedy drama	28 June 2024	115 minutes	Hindi
Agni	Action thriller	6 December 2024	122 minutes	Hindi
The Mehta Boys	Drama	7 February 2025	93 minutes	Hindi
Be Happy	Comedy drama	14 March 2025	130 minutes	Hindi
Chhorii 2	Supernatural horror thriller	11 April 2025	133 minutes	Hindi
Superboys of Malegaon	Drama	24 April 2025	131 minutes	Hindi
Stolen	Action thriller	4 June 2025	93 minutes	Hindi
Uppu Kappurambu	Comedy drama	4 July 2025	136 minutes	Telugu
Cheekatilo	Crime thriller	23 January 2026	126 minutes	Telugu
Subedaar	Action thriller	5 March 2026	142 minutes	Hindi
System	Legal thriller	22 May 2026	123 minutes	Hindi
Babita Singh Reporting	crime drama	28 August 2026	131 minutes	Hindi
Don't Be Shy	romantic comedy	25 September 2026	148 minutes	Hindi

== See also ==
- List of Netflix India original programming
- List of JioHotstar original programming
- List of SonyLIV original programming
- List of ZEE5 original programming
