= Bhuvan Arora =

Indian actor

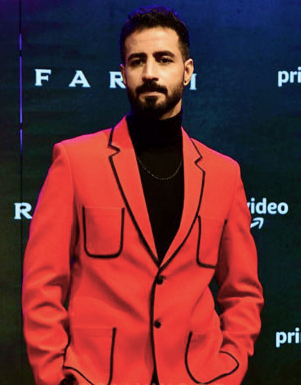
- Arora in 2023
- Education: Film and Television Institute of India
- Occupation: Actor
- Years active: 2013–present

Bhuvan Arora is an Indian actor who works in Hindi films and series. He has appeared in the television series The Test Case (2018) and Farzi (2023), with the latter emerging as his breakout role. Arora has since had supporting roles in the 2024 biographical films Chandu Champion and Amaran.

== Career ==
Arora studied at the Film and Television Institute of India and began his acting career with small roles in the films Shuddh Desi Romance (2013), Tevar (2015) and Naam Shabana (2017). His role in the first, produced by Yash Raj Films, led him to a more prominent role in the company's comedy film Bank Chor (2017). He then played Rohan Rathore, a chauvinistic army aspirant, in the 2018 series The Test Case. Gayatri Gauri of Firstpost wrote that he "essays his role well without becoming a caricature". In 2020, he had a supporting role in the Netflix film Chaman Bahaar.

In 2023, Arora starred alongside Shahid Kapoor in the Amazon Prime Video crime drama series Farzi. Dishya Sharma of News18 found his "comic timing and dialogue delivery" to be "impressive". ThePrint's Nidhima Taneja found his to be the "breakout performance" of the series, adding that "the finesse in his performance, and his spot on Mumbaiya dialect, is a treat to watch".

In 2024, Arora played a supporting role in the biographical sports film Chandu Champion, starring Kartik Aaryan as Murlikant Petkar. He acted in the Tamil biographical war film Amaran as Sepoy Vikram Singh along with Sivakarthikeyan who played the title role of Indian army major Mukund Varadarajan. In the same year, he starred alongside Poojan Chhabra as two brothers navigating university life in the MX Player series Fisaddi.

In 2025, Arora featured alongside an ensemble cast in the Prime Video comedy series Dupahiya. Scroll.in's Nandini Ramnath was appreciative of his comic chemistry with his co-star Sparsh Shrivastava.

== Filmography ==
=== Film ===
| Year | Title | Role | Notes |
|---|---|---|---|
| 2013 | Shuddh Desi Romance | Raghu's friend | |
| 2015 | Tevar | Ghonsla | |
| 2017 | Naam Shabana | Karan | |
| 2017 | Bank Chor | Gulaab | |
| 2019 | Chaman Bahaar | Somu | |
| 2020 | Jai Mummy Di | Dev | |
| 2021 | Kaadan | Maadan | Tamil film |
| 2021 | Aranya | Aarav | Telugu film |
| 2021 | Hathi Mere Saathi | Aarav | |
| 2023 | The Great Indian Family | Bhaata Mishra | |
| 2024 | Chandu Champion | Garnail Singh | |
| 2024 | Amaran | Sepoy Vikram Singh | Tamil film |

=== Television ===
| Year | Title | Role | Notes |
|---|---|---|---|
| 2018 | The Test Case | Capt. Rohan Rathore | |
| 2023 | Farzi | Firoz | |
| 2024 | Fisaddi | Goldie | |
| 2024 | Citadel: Honey Bunny | Honey's friend | Cameo |
| 2025 | Dupahiya | Amavas | |
| 2025 | Janaawar – The Beast Within | SI Hemant Kumar | |
| 2026 | Waiting Hai | Afroz Hamza | |
