= Kalpika Ganesh =

Indian actress

- Born: Hyderabad, Andhra Pradesh, India
- Occupation: Actress

Kalpika Ganesh is an Indian actress who appears in Telugu films. She made her film debut with the film Prayanam in 2009.

== Early life ==
Kalpika Ganesh was born and raised in Hyderabad. Her father has Maharashtrian roots, while her mother is a Mysore Iyengar; both her parents were born in Hyderabad. She grew up speaking Hindi at home and later learned Telugu through her work in the Telugu film industry. She graduated with a BA degree from Vivekananda College, Secunderabad.

== Career ==
Kalpika Ganesh started her career in modeling and later in 2009, she made her film debut from the film Prayanam, directed by Chandra Sekhar Yeleti. Later she acted in other movies and web series. She has also appeared in film like Sarocharu, Seethamma Vakitlo Sirimalle Chettu, Sita on the Road Apart from films she also appeared in web series like Loser and Ekkadiki Ee Parugu.

== Filmography ==
- Note: All films are in Telugu films unless otherwise mentioned.

Key
†	Denotes films that have not yet been released

Year	Title	Role(s)	Notes	Ref.
2009	Prayanam	Moksha		
2010	Orange	Jaanu's friend		
2010	Namo Venkatesa			
2011	Maaro			
2012	Julayi	Neha		
2012	Sarocharu	Kalpika		
2012	Nippu			
2013	Seethamma Vakitlo Sirimalle Chettu	Geetha's sister		
2018	My Dear Marthandam			
2018	Padi Padi Leche Manasu	Vaishali's friend		
2019	Sita on the Road	Anu		
2019	Debbaku Tha Dongala Mutha			
2020	Maa Vintha Gaadha Vinuma	Meghana		
2020	HIT: The First Case	Dr. Roopa		
2021	Eakam	Nitya		
2022	Parole	Thendral	Tamil film	
2022	Yashoda	Teju		
2023	8 A.M. Metro	Mridula	Hindi film	
2023	Atharva			
2025	Mario			

=== Television ===
Year	Title	Role	Network	Ref.
2019	Ekkadiki Ee Parugu	Dr.Saira	ZEE5	
2020	Loser	Ruby Shabana	ZEE5	

== Controversy ==
In June 2025, Kalpika Ganesh was named in a police complaint following an incident at Odeum by Prism, a pub in Gachibowli, Hyderabad. According to the pub's management, Ganesh and a guest allegedly refused to pay a bill of ₹2,200 and became verbally aggressive after being denied a complimentary dessert. She was also accused of damaging property, making inappropriate remarks toward staff, and livestreaming the incident on social media while making serious allegations. Based on a complaint filed by the establishment, the Gachibowli police registered an FIR under Sections 324(4), 352, and 351(2) of the Bharatiya Nyaya Sanhita. The case is under investigation.
