= Dupahiya =

Indian comedy series

- Genre: Comedy; Satire
- Created by: Avinash Dwivedi; Chirag Garg; Salona Bains Joshi; Shubh Shivdasani
- Written by: Avinash Dwivedi; Chirag Garg
- Screenplay by: Srinivas Avasarala
- Directed by: Sonam Nair
- Starring: Gajraj Rao; Renuka Shahane; Sparsh Shrivastava; Shivani Raghuvanshi; Bhuvan Arora
- Composer: Somesh Saha
- Country of origin: India
- Original language: Hindi
- No. of seasons: 2
- No. of episodes: 17

Production
- Producers: Salona Bains Joshi; Shubh Shivdasani
- Cinematography: Piyush Puty
- Editor: Yashashwini Y.P.
- Camera setup: Multi-camera
- Running time: 29–43 minutes
- Production company: Bombay Film Cartel

Original release
- Network: Amazon Prime Video
- Release: 7 March 2025 – present

Dupahiya (transl. Two-wheeler) is an Indian Hindi-language comedy television series created by Avinash Dwivedi, Chirag Garg, Salona Bains Joshi, and Shubh Shivdasani. It stars an ensemble cast led by Gajraj Rao, Renuka Shahane, Sparsh Shrivastava, Shivani Raghuvanshi, and Bhuvan Arora. Set in a peaceful village, the series focusses on the chaos that unfolds when a motorbike mysteriously disappears.

Dupahiya premiered on Amazon Prime Video on 7 March 2025 to generally positive reviews from critics. A second season premiered on 1 October 2026.

== Premise ==
A peaceful village, celebrating 25 years without crime, is thrown into chaos when a dowry motorbike mysteriously disappears. With the jubilee trophy, an upcoming wedding, and the town's reputation at stake, the villagers embark on a frantic search to recover the stolen bike before it's too late.

== Cast ==
- Gajraj Rao as Banwari Jha
- Renuka Shahane as Pushplata Yadav
- Sparsh Shrivastava as Bhugol Jha
- Bhuvan Arora as Amavas
- Shivani Raghuvanshi as Roshni Jha
- Anjuman Saxena as Malti Jha
- Yashpal Sharma as Mithlesh Kushwaha
- Yogendra Tikku as Madhuban Singh, Sarpanch of Tundpur
- Dinesh Lal Yadav as Pratham Kumar Sir
- Samarth Mahor as Teepu
- Komal Kushwaha as Nirmal Yadav
- Avinash Dwivedi as Kuber Tripathi
- Chandan Kumar as Madan Kumar
- Brijendra Kala as Gyan Chand
- Manoj Tiger as Ghuttan
- Godaan Kumar as Durlabh Kumar
- Pranjal Pateriya as Pintu Bhai
- Smriti Mishra as Amavas's Bhabhi
- Shriram Jog as Kadak Singh Yadav
- Vinod Jewant as Parmaanu Singh
- Sanjay Sonu as Pandit

== Episodes ==
No.	Title	Directed by	Written by	Original release date
1	"Bambai"	Sonam Nair	Avinash Dwivedi, Chirag Garg	7 March 2025
The series introduces Dhadakpur, a village renowned for its lack of crime. The Jha family's preparations for their daughter Roshni's wedding are central to the narrative. Roshni's chosen groom demands an unusual dowry: a Royal Enfield Classic 350 motorcycle. Despite financial constraints, the family procures the bike, which is celebrated during the day. However, the celebration is short-lived as the motorcycle is stolen that very night, leaving the family with only eight days to recover it before the wedding.
2	"Chor Nahi Chikaar"	Sonam Nair	Avinash Dwivedi, Chirag Garg	7 March 2025
Banwari discovers the theft, and Bhugol and Teepu attempt to deflect suspicion by implicating Amavas. The village Sarpanch arrives with news, while Banwari and Roshni interrogate Amavas, their interaction revealing a past romantic connection. The investigation yields no leads, leaving the family with seven days until the wedding.
3	"Oh Mere Jija Ji"	Sonam Nair	Avinash Dwivedi, Chirag Garg	7 March 2025
Amavas decides to assist in recovering the stolen bike. Kuber, the groom, arrives to inspect the motorcycle. Banwari, aided by Pandit and Bhugol, attempts to deceive Kuber. Madan discovers the Jha family's secret, leading Banwari to take drastic measures. The wedding deadline is now six days away.
4	"Kanoon Ke Haath"	Sonam Nair	Avinash Dwivedi, Chirag Garg	7 March 2025
ASI Mithlesh, a police officer, suspects foul play in Dhadakpur and becomes particularly interested when he learns Banwari is involved. Amavas presents his plan at a village meeting. Madan is arrested, and Amavas and Bhugol embark on a mission to salvage the village's reputation and Roshni's wedding. The wedding is five days away.
5	"Piyo Magar Pyaar Se"	Sonam Nair	Avinash Dwivedi, Chirag Garg	7 March 2025
The Sarpanch questions Pushpalata regarding village rumors. Wedding festivities begin, but Roshni experiences doubts. Durlabh encourages Kuber to verify the motorcycle's purchase. Amavas and Bhugol share personal vulnerabilities while consuming alcohol, as the replacement motorcycle is prepared. The wedding is four days away.
6	"Ullu Mat Bolna"	Sonam Nair	Avinash Dwivedi, Chirag Garg	7 March 2025
Bhugol and Amavas perform at a birthday party to raise funds for the motorcycle. Roshni confronts Kuber. Madan faces a moral dilemma regarding a job offer. Banwari seeks assistance from the police. Pushpalata announces a village punishment. Teepu provides financial aid to Nirmal for her treatment. The wedding is three days away.
7	"Ulta Chor Kotwal Ko Dante"	Sonam Nair	Avinash Dwivedi, Chirag Garg	7 March 2025
Mithlesh intensifies his search for the thief. Amavas and Bhugol escape from Parmanu. Amavas expresses dissatisfaction with Kuber. Pushpalata considers resignation. Mithlesh's investigation identifies a suspect, but Teepu provides crucial evidence. Roshni's anxiety increases. The wedding is two days away.
8	"Bhootpurv Premi"	Sonam Nair	Avinash Dwivedi, Chirag Garg	7 March 2025
Nirmal's medical treatment is within reach. Banwari struggles with wedding preparations due to a village boycott. A key witness provides information to Mithlesh. Amavas confronts Bhugol about Kuber. A physical altercation threatens the motorcycle's delivery. The wedding procession begins. The wedding is hours away.
9	"Atmanirbhar"	Sonam Nair	Avinash Dwivedi, Chirag Garg	7 March 2025
On the wedding day, Nirmal persuades Pushpalata to end the village boycott. Kuber and his wedding party arrive, only to find the motorcycle missing, threatening the ceremony. Mithlesh apprehends the thief, uncovering a conspiracy orchestrated by the Sarpanch, who colluded with a local politician to steal and conceal the bike. The Sarpanch's plan was to appear as a savior by donating the vehicle at the last moment, thus enhancing his public image. However, Roshni, disgusted by Kuber's blatant greed for the motorcycle, refuses to marry him. Kuber, in turn, accuses Roshni of also seeking a lavish city life through the marriage, implying her own greed. Roshni defiantly vows to achieve financial independence by passing the same competitive exam, or remain single forever. The people of Dhadakpur, inspired by Roshni's resolve, pledge to abolish the practice of dowry. The episode concludes with Nirmal expressing gratitude to her friend who sold his father's tractor tyres for her cosmetic treatment, and Roshni diligently studying for her future. Bhugol, meanwhile, achieves his dream of viral internet fame.

== Release ==
Dupahiya premiered on Amazon Prime Video on 7 March 2025.

== Reception ==
Shubhra Gupta of The Indian Express rated 3/5 stars and writes in her review that "Gajraj Rao, Renuka Shahane's ruralcom delivers clean, socially-relevant family entertainment. The show has a determinedly cheerful air, leaving the viewer smiling is clearly the mandate." Deepa Gahlot of Rediff.com gave it 3.5 stars out of 5 and said that "Such a collection of amiable characters were last seen in Panchayat. There are greedy dowry seekers, criminals, misogynists and the like, but the collective goodness of the others keep violence and male chauvinism in check."

Hardika Gupta of NDTV awarded the series 2.5/5 stars and said "At times, the humour can feel too forced, especially when the plot takes detours into slapstick and quirky situations." Devesh Sharma of Filmfare gave 3.5 stars out of 5 and said that "Dupahiya is a comedy revolving around the problems of the common man. It’s buoyed by good performance by the entire ensemble cast." Abhimanyu Mathur of Hindustan Times writes in his review that "Flawless performances complement impeccable writing in this social satire that hits all the right notes."

Rahul Desai of The Hollywood Reporter India opined, "The nine-episode series has its moments, but stays too derivative to make an impact." Shilajit Mitra of The Hindu "said that Built around a stolen motorcycle in a village, this is a sweet, soporific series that passes the time, with a winsome performance by Gajraj Rao. Vinamra Mathur of Firstpost writes in his review that "It’s not easy to write down what all happens in the show. It’s one mayhem after another ala any Priyadarshan movie of the early 2000s". Arushi Jain of India Today gave 3 stars out of 5 and writes that "This Prime Video series is a charming small-town comedy with endearing performances, witty dialogues, and social themes. While it drags at times, its humour and heart make it a delightful, easy watch." Archika Khurana of The Times of India gave 4 stars out of 5 and said that "With its breezy tone, well-paced progression, and a mix of hilarious one-liners and touching emotional beats, Dupahiya is an endearing and well-crafted watch."

== See also ==
- List of Amazon India originals
