= Varshadhare =

- Directed by: Vemagal Jagannatharao
- Written by: Vemagal Jagannatharao
- Produced by: Pillapa Ramaswamy
- Starring: Mithun Tejasvi; Payal Ghosh
- Music by: B. Ajaneesh Loknath
- Release date: February 26, 2010
- Running time: 150 minutes
- Country: India
- Language: Kannada

Varshadhare is a 2010 Kannada film directed by Vemagal Jagannatharao. It stars Mithun Tejasvi and Payal Ghosh in lead roles.

== Cast ==
- Mithun Tejasvi as Rahul
- Payal Ghosh as Mythili
- Suraj Lokre as Niranjan
- Sangeetha Shetty as Nirmala

== Soundtrack ==
All songs are composed by B. Ajaneesh Loknath.

== Reception ==
=== Critical response ===
A critic from The Times of India scored the film at 3 out of 5 stars and says "While Mithun has given a good performance, Payal is simply superb. Sangeetha Shetty impresses. Ajanish Loknath's music passes the muster". A critic from Bangalore Mirror wrote "The director weaves a story about a newly-wed housewife and her struggle to come to terms with a husband unwilling to consummate the marriage. Then there is the lecherous colleague of the husband who is also trying to scuttle a sensitive project. To make things interesting attempts to kill the team members developing a new software envelopes the narrative". Sify.com wrote "Music by Ajaneesh Lokanath is pathetic. Most of the tracks are not worth recalling. Besides, the background score for a thriller is disappointing. A highlight of the movie is the serene locations of the songs".
