= The Test Case (TV series) =

- Genre: Drama
- Created by: Ekta Kapoor; Samar Khan
- Developed by: Endemol Shine India
- Written by: Ishita Moitra
- Screenplay by: Mukul Srivastava; Nagesh Kukunoor
- Story by: Samar Khan; Vinay Waikul
- Directed by: Vinay Waikul; Nagesh Kukunoor
- Creative director: Nimisha Pandey
- Starring: Nimrat Kaur; Akshay Oberoi; Atul Kulkarni; Rahul Dev; Anup Soni
- Theme music composer: Tapas Relia (Background Music)
- Opening theme: Sohail Sen
- Country of origin: India
- Original language: Hindi
- No. of seasons: 1
- No. of episodes: 10

Production
- Executive producer: Mrinalini Khanna
- Producers: Shefali Bandyopadhyay; Akshay Mhatre; Shravan Reddy
- Production locations: Mumbai, Maharashtra
- Editors: Abhishek Seth; Shakti Hasija
- Camera setup: Multi-camera
- Running time: ~30 minutes
- Production company: Endemol Shine India
- Budget: ~4 crores

Original release
- Network: ALT Balaji
- Release: 30 April 2017 – 26 January 2018

The Test Case is a 2017 Indian web series, directed by Vinay Waikul and Nagesh Kukunoor and produced by Endemol Shine India for the ALTBalaji. It stars Nimrat Kaur, Akshay Oberoi, Atul Kulkarni, Rahul Dev and Anup Soni in lead roles along with Juhi Chawla in a guest appearance. The web series is about the main character training to be the first woman test case in a combat role, within the Indian Army. The basic story of this web series is inspired from the 1997 American film G.I. Jane and former Canadian Army officer Sandra Perron's memoir Outstanding in the Field.

== Plot ==
Captain Shikha Sharma is the only woman in a group of Indian Army officers training to join the Special forces. She is also the first woman to be undertaking the course making her a "test case" for inducting women into combat oriented roles in the Indian army. The storyline revolves around her journey of overcoming challenges at home to biases by her colleagues despite being an intelligent and a highly motivated individual.

Shikha initially faces physical challenges when completing a demanding obstacle course. But she perseveres and overcomes them with grit. This results in making both friends and enemies among her colleagues. She manages to not only remain in the course but also moves up to the top-half of the team's leaderboard. During the final phase of training, which is in the form of a simulated sortie into harsh enemy territory spanning multiple days, Shikha is placed in command of one of the two competing squads in an effort to test her leadership skills. The exercise ends in disaster with the squad losing contact with the course instructors for a prolonged period of time. The squad eventually makes it back with Shikha and Captain Bilal suffering severe injuries and unconscious. A medical examination reveals that Shikha's injuries were not as a result of combat injuries. But a follow-up interrogation by the lead course instructor Naib Subedar Kirpal Bhatti and the course commanding officer Colonel Ajinkya Sathe has Shikha and the members of her squad insisting that nothing untoward happened and the injuries were as a result of an accident.

In the meanwhile, an anonymous letter is sent to the Army command alleging that Shikha was sexually assaulted during the exercise. Lieutenant Colonel Imtiaz Hussain, a poker aficionado, is dispatched to investigate quickly and quietly. Using a series of unconventional tactics Colonel Hussain ultimately manages to piece together the sequence of events and identify the culprit. But Shikha refuses to press charges saying she wants to solve this problem without anyone else helping her. She explains to Hussain that she wants to set a clear example that women are not only just capable of joining combat units but also equally capable of defending themselves without help. She ultimately manages to get Captain Manit Varma to confess while covertly recording his confession; And also manages to defeat him in one on one close quarter combat. He is ultimately arrested and led away by the Army police.

The story ends on a happy note with Shikha graduating top of the training course.

== Cast ==
- Nimrat Kaur as Captain Shikha Sharma (Corps of Army Intelligence, Para Probie)
- Juhi Chawla as Shraddha Pandit (cameo) - Minister of Defense
- Atul Kulkarni as Colonel Ajinkya Sathe - CO, SFTS (Parachute Regiment)
- Rahul Dev as Naib Subedar Kirpal Bhatti - Instructor, SFTS (Parachute Regiment)
- Anup Soni as Lieutenant Colonel Imtiaz Hussain (Parachute Regiment)
- Akshay Oberoi as Captain Bilal Siddiqui (Artillery Regiment, Para Probie)
- Manit Joura as Captain Avinash Walia (Mechanized Infantry, Para Probie)
- Bhuvan Arora as Captain Rohan Rathore (Brigade Of The Guards, Para Probie)
- Sumit Suri as Captain Ranjit Surjewal (Madras Regiment, Para Probie)
- Tarun Gahlot as Captain 'Tank' Chauhan (Para Probie)
- Bijou Thaangjam as Rifleman Tej Bahadhur Thapa (3GR, Para Probie)
- Saurabh Goyal as Captain Vishnu Soren (Bihar Regiment, Para Probie)
- Suhail Nayyar as Captain Manit Verma (Bombay Sappers, Para Probie)
- Shruthy Menon as Dr.Captain Aparna Rao - RMO (Army Medical Corps)
- Rio Kapadia as Major General M. Sundar Raman
- Arshia Verma as Captain Rohan Rathore’s Daughter
- Samir Kochhar as Shivalik Ahuja
- Pawan Chopra as Subedar Major Devidyal (Capt Shikha Sharma's father)
- Rituraj Singh as General Bedi
- Sonal Jha as Captain Shikha's Mother
- Rajveer Singh Rajput as Tender

== Episodes ==
- Episode 1: The Beginning.
- Episode 2: The Outsider.
- Episode 3: The Player.
- Episode 4: Heart of Darkness - Part 1.
- Episode 5: Heart of Darkness - Part 2.
- Episode 6: Down but Not Out.
- Episode 7: Mind Games.
- Episode 8: Prisoners of Conscience.
- Episode 9: The Confession.
- Episode 10: Season Finale: What goes around... Comes around.

== Delay in episode availability ==
The first episode of the series was made available on the launch date over the ALT Balaji App. The future of the series appeared uncertain after successive episodes did not follow for a prolonged period. Reports of creative differences emerged between the director and the producer as a possible reason for the delay. Eventually it was announced that from the second episode onwards, Kukunoor had been replaced by Vinay Waikul as the director. Waikul had previously served as first assistant director for films like Dangal, 3 idiots, Bhaag Milkha Bhaag and Ghajini. This web series was Waikul's directorial debut.

In December 2017, an announcement from the show's producer confirmed the shooting having been completed for the remaining 9 episodes. These were made available for viewing on 26 January 2018 - to coincide with the Indian Republic Day.

== Reception ==
Bollywood actor Aamir Khan liked the series and appreciated the entire cast of the series for their efforts.

== Awards ==
Year	Award	Category	Recipient	Result	Ref.
2017	Indian Television Academy Awards	Best Director in a Web Series	Nagesh Kukunoor	Won	
2017	Indian Television Academy Awards	Best Actress in a Web Series	Nimrat Kaur	Won	
2018	IWM Digital Awards	Best Actress Drama	Nimrat Kaur	Won	
2018	iReel Awards	Best Actress Drama	Nimrat Kaur	Won	
2018	Streaming Awards - February Edition	Best Actress	Nimrat Kaur	Won	

== See also ==
- Women in Indian Armed Forces
- Indian Special Forces
