= Vibe (film) =

2026 Indian film by Kunal Khemu

- Theatrical release poster
- Directed by: Kunal Khemu
- Written by: Kunal Khemu
- Produced by: Kunal Khemu; Chirag Nihalani
- Starring: Preity Zinta; Dinesh Lal Yadav; Kunal Khemu; Sparsh Shrivastava; Yashpal Sharma
- Cinematography: Kaushal Shah
- Edited by: Anand Subaya; Sanjay Shrirang Ingle
- Music by: Amit Trivedi
- Production companies: Amazon MGM Studios; Drongo Films
- Distributed by: PVR Inox Pictures
- Release date: 18 September 2026
- Running time: 145 minutes
- Country: India
- Language: Hindi
- Budget: est. ₹35–40 crore (Note: The Free Press Journal reported a budget of ₹35 crore. Times Now and Cinema Express reported a budget of ₹40 crore.)
- Box office: est. ₹17.74 crore

Vibe is a 2026 Indian Hindi-language action thriller comedy film written, produced and directed by Kunal Khemu, who also stars in the film alongside Preity Zinta, Sparsh Shrivastava and Vanshika Dhir in her debut role. It is Khemu's second film as a writer and director after 2024's Madgaon Express and an over three decades long career as an actor, as well as his producing debut.

This film has been developed as a spin-off of Kunal's previous film as a director, where Hardik, played by himself was present in a special appearance. Kaushal Shah served as cinematographer, while editings were handled by Anand Subaya and Sanjay Shrirang, and Mukesh Chhabra served as casting director. The film was released theatrically in India on 18 September 2026.

== Plot ==
Bhagirath AKA "Bugs" is a sincere and top-performing software engineer at a tech company, while his best friend Hardik is a drug addict undergoing rehab for his addiction. Because of severe drug use, Hardik occasionally undergoes hallucinations.

On the recommendation of Bugs, Hardik gets a job in the marketing department of the same company. Here, Hardik meets Kareena who is a newly joined intern in his department. They instantly take a liking for each other. Hardik plans a surreal date for Kareena where they sneak into a planetarium which is closed and gives her a wonderful view of the sky. Unbeknownst to Hardik, a few people barge into the planetarium and, thinking that these are guards, they both sneak out of the planetarium. Hardik is disappointed that his date has been ruined-however, Kareena reveals that she has thoroughly enjoyed the date and invites him for a second date with her dad on Sunday, aiming to prank him by introducing Hardik as her boyfriend.

Meanwhile Madam H, a senior intelligence officer, gets input that a wanted international terrorist named Abu Al Sayeed is planning an attack in India. She is subsequently tasked by the Home Minister to neutralize the attack by any means.

While driving back, Hardik is tranquilized by a dart fired by someone working for Madam H. He is brought to her base and interrogated, where it is revealed that Kareena is actually Huma Al-Sayeed, the sister of Abu Al Sayeed. They let him go on the condition that he would keep this secret and attend the date on Sunday to get further details. However, Hardik overdoses on drugs again and accidentally reveals Kareena's real identity to Bugs, following which they are both tranquilized by an agent masquerading as a pizza delivery person and are both brought to H's base. H berates Hardik for revealing the secret, and ultimately greenlights the plan for him to go on the date on Sunday.

A series of mishaps occur at the date, as a taser is attached to Hardik which is activated whenever he strays from the script assigned to him-however, he is able to avoid drawing suspicion and meets with Huma's father, who has to leave to attend to a mysterious call. After Huma drops Hardik to his place, they both share a kiss, after which her car is blown up by a bomb. Heart broken, Hardik returns home. The next day, he gets a call from Abu Al Sayeed inviting him and Bugs to Huma's sister in Bangkok. Madam H's team forces them to attend the funeral in Thailand after giving them a crash course on combat and survival techniques. They are both equipped with a red and blue pill-the blue pill is designed to temporarily stop the heart of the person who ingests it for 7 minutes, allowing them to fake their death. Meanwhile, the red pill, named "Sipahi 1", is capable of granting superhuman strength for a limited period of time, although it is untested and has dangerous side effects-something H does not disclose to them.

After they land in Thailand, Abu Al Sayeed's team abducts them from the airport by smartly giving a slip to Madam H's team. The trackers implanted on them are also removed, leaving H's team in the dark on their status. Both are taken to a hotel where they meet Abid, a stock trader, who explains that Abu Al Sayeed is his client.

Rest of the story follows comic twists and turns how Bugs and Hardik are able to survive through this mess.

== Cast ==
- Preity Zinta as Madam H
- Kunal Khemu as Hardik Sharma
- Sparsh Shrivastava as Bhagirath "Bugs" Bhargav
- Vanshika Dhir as Kareena / Huma Al Sayeed
- Salem Kali as Abid
- Yashpal Sharma as Rawal
- Dinesh Lal Yadav as Bansi
- Rajesh A Krishnan as Bugs' boss
- Sharmila Tagore as Home Minister
- Uorfi Javed as Dr. Chanchal Screwvala
- Hiten Paintal as Abu Al Sayeed, Huma's elder brother
- Mark Bennington as Badshah Al Sayeed, Abu and Huma's father

== Production ==
=== Casting ===
The film has been cited as being part of Preity Zinta's acting comeback, the second of two films starring her in 2026 after Batwara 1947, released a month prior. Once one of Indian cinema's most bankable lead actresses, she had not acted professionally since an episode of the American TV series Fresh Off the Boat in 2020 and last appeared in an Indian film in 2018's Bhaiaji Superhit. Khemu cast her from being a huge fan of hers, with his initial idea being that she would play a fictionalized version of herself in the film, a spy who is a famous actress as a cover. While this idea was scrapped, he remained keen to cast her, especially after realizing she had never done action scenes before. Zinta eventually agreed, having herself long wanted to portray an action film character. In 2020, she had shared numerous videos of herself training with action film consultant Aaron Cohen in various types of types of situations on Instagram to showcase her willingness and availability for such a role.

The film also marks the acting debut of Vanshika Dhir, while Khemu's mother-in-law, veteran actress Sharmila Tagore, plays a cameo role.

=== Filming ===
Zinta described the shoot as tough and physically challenging due to the action scenes and long working days which often lasted up to eighteen hours, which she didn't mind as she was eager to complete her work quickly and be able to return to her family in the United States. She also revealed on social media that she had injured her shoulder severely during filming.

== Marketing ==
The film was first announced on 19 March 2026, after filming was complete. Amazon MGM Studios released a 1m20s teaser on YouTube on 20 August 2026, a day after unveiling its poster.

A launch event for the main 2m44s trailer was organised on 2 September 2026 in Mumbai with presence of the film's casting and production team, as well as Khemu's wife, actress Soha Ali Khan.

== Soundtrack ==
Vibe

Soundtrack album by Amit Trivedi, Kanishka Pal, Kunal Kemmu, Bharath, Raghav Meattle and Ashutosh Anand
- Released: 11 September 2026
- Genre: Feature film soundtrack
- Length: 17:04
- Language: Hindi
- Label: Tips Music

Official audio
- Vibe – Full Album on YouTube

The music of the film is composed by Amit Trivedi. The first song “Raaton Mein Aana” was released on 27 August 2026 and it was written by Kumaar and sung by Amit Trivedi. The second single, "Aisi Meri Vibe", a rap song written and performed by Shubham Sopan Khillari, Irfana Hameed and Kanishka Pal (aka Kanfuzion), was released a week and a half later on 7 September. The film's music rights are held by Tips Industries.

Track listing
No.	Title	Lyrics	Music	Singer(s)	Length
1.	"Raaton Mein Aana"	Kumaar	Amit Trivedi	Amit Trivedi	3:12
2.	"Aisi Meri Vibe"	Shubham Sopan Khillari, Irfana Hameed	Kanishka Pal	Shubham Sopan Khillari, Irfana Hameed, Kanfuzion	2:51
3.	"Rafta Rafta"	Kumaar, Akshay Dhawan	Amit Trivedi	Aditya Jain, Akshay Dhawan	2:49
4.	"Baadshah"	Kunal Kemmu	Kunal Kemmu, Bharath, Raghav Meattle, Ashutosh Anand	Kunal Kemmu, Nidhi Wagle	2:32
5.	"Underdog"	Kumaar	Amit Trivedi	Shahid Mallya	3:04
6.	"Sipahi Ek"	Kumaar	Amit Trivedi	Ashim Kemson	2:36
Total length:					17:04

== Release ==
Vibe was theatrically released on 18 September 2026.

=== Certification ===
The film received an A certificate from the CBFC along with a finalised runtime of 145 minutes. Except muting two words, the film got no visual cut by the censor board.

=== Distribution ===
PVR Inox Pictures will be releasing in India and Reliance Entertainment for the overseas distribution.

== Reception ==
=== Box office ===
Vibe grossed ₹15.84 crore (US$1.7 million) worldwide. It grossed ₹14.21 crore (US$1.5 million) in India and ₹1.63 crore (US$170,000) in overseas market.

On its opening day, the film earned ₹1.65 crore net at the domestic box office.

=== Critical response ===
On the review aggregator website Rotten Tomatoes, 82% of 11 critics' reviews are positive, with an average rating of 6/10.

Dhaval Roy of The Times of India gave the film 3.5 stars out of 5, concluding, "If you're looking for a laugh riot driven by good performances and unabashed silliness, this one will match your vibe." Shubhra Gupta for The Indian Express praised the film as a "a full-on goofy spy saga" with "the right degree of silliness" which made it work, and noted the performances. Likewise, Shachi Chaturvedi of News18 gave the film 3.5 stars out of 5 and wrote, "Kemmu is making the kind of cinema we did not know we needed", preferring it to other films of recent projects from the spy thriller genre: "After watching Vibe, one can easily say that not Pathaan or Tiger, but 'bahumuliya gadhas' (important donkeys) are what Bollywood desperately needs right now. The film doesn't take itself too seriously, and that's exactly where its charm lies." Bhavna Agarwal of India Today gave the film 3 stars out of 5, calling it "messy, occasionally overstuffed and undeniably indulgent, but it also has a distinct comic voice", but also panned the screenplay, which created "the sense of a story that is constantly trying to outdo itself". A critic at Bollywood Hungama gave the film 3 stars out of 5 as well and concluded, "On the whole, Vibe works due to Kunal Kemmu's strong command over humour, several hilarious one-liners and entertaining performances. Though the film loses steam in the second half and the villain track feels routine, it has enough madcap moments to keep viewers amused."

Arathi Kannan of Deccan Herald awarded 3/5 stars to the film and observed "Vibe keeps its humour ridiculous, but it largely works because of the stellar cast. The plot never quite thickens, but it grooves to the tune already set without veering off course." Saibal Chatterjee of NDTV wrote that while Vibe is not "deliriously funny", it "has just enough steam to keep rolling without letting the missteps get in the way of the vibes that it wants to transmit." He further noted Zinta for "a part earnest, part tongue-in-cheek performance" and concluded: "Vibe is Kemmu's film all the way, but it belongs more to the actor than the director. His performance packs all the madness that the role demands." BH Harsh of Cinema Express noted, "Vibe is a good showcase of why Kunal is possibly one of the best comic actor we have today, and deserves better scripts, including the ones he is writing." Rahul Desai of The Hollywood Reporter India noted "It’s difficult to be too upset. Even when Vibe descends into wish-fulfillment and bucket-list-filmmaking mode, it stays in service of the two silly underdogs who are dragged into a space of soul-killing sobriety." Snigdha Sweta Behera of Wion observed, "The film appears willing to poke fun at the larger-than-life spy genre rather than taking itself too seriously," but wrote in review, "The film has a fairly long running time for a comedy-driven spy caper."
