= Shashank (actor) =

Indian actor

- Born: 22 November 1979 (age 46); Secunderabad, Andhra Pradesh, India
- Education: Andhra University (B. Com)
- Occupation: Actor
- Years active: 2002-present

Shashank (born 22 November 1979) is an Indian actor who predominantly appears in Telugu films.

== Career ==
Shashank's first film as a lead Aithe won the National Film Award for Best Feature Film in Telugu. His next film was Sye, for which he won a Nandi Award for Best Supporting Actor.

== Filmography ==
- All films are in Telugu, unless otherwise noted.

Year	Title	Role	Notes
2002	Vachina Vaadu Suryudu	Kiran	
2003	Aithe	Kumar	
2004	Sye	Shashank	Nandi Award for Best Supporting Actor
2005	Anukokunda Oka Roju	Rajesh	
2006	Party	Katuri Ramesh Chandra "Bujji"	
2007	Prem	Prem Kumar	
2007	50 Lakh	Kumar	Hindi film
2008	Victory	Ravi	
2009	Bangaru Babu	Hari	
2009	Kavya's Diary	Abhi	
2009	Sindhanai Sei	Pazhani	Tamil film; Dubbed into Telugu as Bheebatsam
2010	Yemaindi Ee Vela	Yuva	
2011	Koffi Bar	Ramakrishna	
2011	Money Money, More Money	Akash Priyadharshan	
2012	Kulu Manali		
2013	Donga Police	Jack / Janaki Ram	
2013	Nimidangal	Ramakrishna	Tamil film
2013	Ade Nuvvu Ade Nenu	Shashank	
2014	Yevadu	Shashank	
2014	Nee Jathaga Nenundali	Vivek	
2014	Paathshala	Karthik	
2016	Raja Cheyyi Vesthe	Police Officer Subhash	
2016	Jyo Achyutananda	Juvvala Bala Bharadwaj	
2017	Duvvada Jagannadham	DJ's assistant	
2017	Anando Brahma		
2017	Jaya Janaki Nayaka	Veerendra Varma	
2018	Veera Bhoga Vasantha Rayalu	Constable Ramarao	
2024	Dear Nanna		
2024	Maa Nanna Superhero	Arshad	
2025	Eleven	Ranjith	Simultaneously shot in Tamil
2026	Biker	Aman	

=== Television ===
Year	Title	Role	Network	Ref.
2019	Ekkadiki Ee Parugu	Madhur	ZEE5	seasons 1-2
2020	Loser	Wilson	ZEE5	seasons 1-2
2023	Vyooham	Chaitanya	Amazon Prime Video	
