= Rainbow Rishta =

Indian queer docuseries

- Genre: Queer; Docuseries
- Written by: Monisha Thyagarajan; Navin Noronha; Sneha Nair
- Directed by: Hridaye Nagpal; Jaydeep Sarkar; Shubhra Chaterjee
- Starring: Trinetra Haldar Gummaraju; Aishwarya Ayushmaan; Daniella Mendonca; Aneez Saikia; Sanam Choudhary; Soham Sengupta; Suresh Ramdas; Sadam Hanjabam
- Composers: Chaoba Thiyam; Rishikesh Thangjam; Sanjay Das
- Country of origin: India
- Original language: Hindi
- No. of seasons: 1
- No. of episodes: 6

Production
- Producers: Jaydeep Sarkar; Niharika Kotwal; Samira Kanwar
- Cinematography: Amal Sudhakaran; Ankit Mhatre; Juhi Sharma; Sundarram Arjun; Vandita Jain
- Editors: Ashutosh Matela; Geeta Singh; Nabeel Alvi
- Camera setup: Multi-camera
- Running time: 35 minutes
- Production company: Vice Studios

Original release
- Network: Amazon Prime Video
- Release: 7 November 2023

Rainbow Rishta is an Indian English-language queer docuseries. Produced under the banner of Vice Studios, it stars Trinetra Haldar Gummaraju, Aishwarya Ayushmaan, Daniella Mendonca, Aneez Saikia, Sanam Choudhary, Soham Sengupta, Suresh Ramdas and Sadam Hanjabam in the lead. It premiered on Amazon Prime Video on 7 November 2023.

== Cast ==
- Trinetra Haldar Gummaraju
- Aishwarya Ayushmaan
- Daniella Mendonca
- Aneez Saikia
- Sanam Choudhary
- Soham Sengupta
- Suresh Ramdas
- Sadam Hanjabam

== Production ==
The announcement of the series was made by Amazon Prime, consisting of six episodes. Trinetra Haldar Gummaraju, Aishwarya Ayushmaan, Daniella Mendonca, Aneez Saikia, Sanam Choudhary, Soham Sengupta, Suresh Ramdas and Sadam Hanjabam joined the cast. The series was screened at the Jio MAMI Mumbai Film Festival 2023.

== Reception ==
Sanjib Kalita in The Indian Express discusses the series, stating that "it is an innovative attempt to convey both the complexity of queer love and the idea that queer love can transcend physical intimacy." Kalita further adds that it compels us to question whether what is portrayed in the series truly encapsulates the essence of queer love.

Trisha Bhattacharya gave the series a four-star rating out of five in her review for India Today. In her review for Rediff.com, Deepa Gahlot rated the series a 3.5 out of 5 stars. Shubhra Gupta gave the series a three-star rating out of five in her review for The Indian Express.

The series was reviewed by various other media publications, such as Firstpost and The Hindu.

=== Accolades ===
| Year | Award | Category | Result | Ref. |
|---|---|---|---|---|
| 2024 | GLAAD Media Awards | Outstanding Documentary | Nominated | |

== See also ==
- List of Amazon India originals
