= Payal Ghosh =

Indian actress and politician

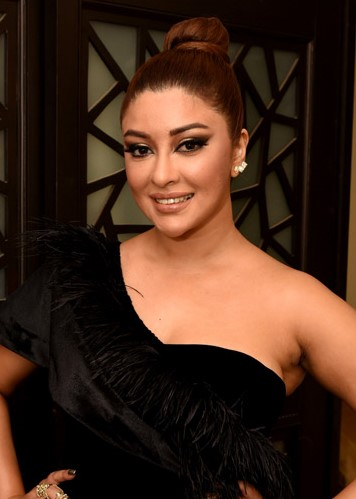
- Ghosh in 2018
- Born: 1986 (age 39–40); Kolkata, West Bengal, India
- Education: Scottish Church College
- Occupation: Actress
- Years active: 2008–2017
- Political party: Republican Party of India (A) (2020–present)

Vice President of Women's Wing, Republican Party of India (Athawale)
- Incumbent
- Assumed office 26 October 2020

Payal Ghosh (born 1986) is an Indian politician and former actress, who worked in Telugu and Hindi films. In 2020, Ghosh filed a police complaint alleging sexual harassment against filmmaker Anurag Kashyap in connection with an alleged 2013 incident. Kashyap denied the allegations, describing them as baseless, alleging that the complaint was politically motivated in response to his criticism of the government. The matter received media attention, and related legal proceedings included a defamation suit filed by actor Richa Chadha, which was later settled following Ghosh's apology. In October 2020, she joined the Republican Party of India (Athawale) and was appointed vice president of its women's wing.

== Early life and education ==
Payal Ghosh was born in 1986 in Kolkata, West Bengal, she went to the St. Paul's Mission School Kolkata, and later graduated in Political Science Honours from the Scottish Church College.

== Career ==
=== Acting ===
When she was 17 years old, she had accompanied her friend to an audition for Sharpe's Peril and landed a role in the BBC Telefilm. In the period drama based on English soldier Richard Sharpe, Payal had played a village girl, the daughter of a revolutionary freedom fighter from Bengal. Payal also starred in a Canadian film in which she played a school girl in love with her neighbour's servant. Since her parents disapproved of her decision to join films, during her college holidays, she ran away from her home in Calcutta and came to Mumbai. She joined Namit Kishore's acting academy, where she met Chandra Sekhar Yeleti who offered her the lead role in his Prayanam, opposite Manchu Manoj. Later, she was seen in the Telugu films Mr. Rascal and Oosaravelli and the Kannada film Varshadhare.

She completed her first Tamil film Therodum Veedhiyile, directed by Saro Sriram, in which she played a traditional girl, who lives in Erode. She was selected as the female lead by Vivek Agnihotri for his Bollywood film Freedom and filmed for it in 2012. She signed another Hindi comedy film, Patel Ki Punjabi Shaadi opposite Vir Das, directed by Sanjay Chhel. which was released worldwide on 15 September 2017.

=== End of the acting career ===
In April 2020, she stated that she was out of work, financially broke, and was leading a life she had never imagined.

=== Defamation suit ===
On 23 September 2020, Ghosh accused Anurag Kashyap and filed a police complaint for sexually harassing her at Yari Road in Versova, Mumbai in 2013. Kashyap dismissed the allegations as baseless, calling it an attempt to silence him from criticising the government.

On 1 October 2020, Mumbai police called Kashyap for questioning about the case. He denied the allegations and provided documents as evidence to prove that he was filming in Sri Lanka at the time, when Ghosh alleged the incident in Mumbai had taken place.

In October actor Richa Chadha filed defamation suit in Bombay High Court against Ghosh seeking ₹1.1 Crore damages for attempting to unnecessarily drag Chadha's name into Ghosh's allegation against Kashyap. After Payal Ghosh gave an un-conditional apology to Richa Chadha for her defamatory remarks, Bombay HC recorded the settlement of the case.

=== Political career ===
On 26 October 2020 she joined Ramdas Athawale's political party and on the same day, she was appointed the vice president of its women's wing.

=== Mental health ===
In June 2025, Ghosh spoke about her struggles with depression and anxiety in an interview with IANS. She stated that she had been undergoing emotional challenges for several years and sought professional help to manage her condition.

== Filmography ==
Year	Title	Role	Language	Notes
2008	Sharpe's Peril	Padme	English	British film
2009	Prayanam	Harika	Telugu	
2010	Varshadhaare	Mythili	Kannada	
2011	Oosaravelli	Chitra	Telugu	
2011	Mr. Rascal	Soundariya	Telugu	
2017	Patel Ki Punjabi Shaadi	Pooja	Hindi	

=== Television ===
Year	Title	Role	Network
2016	Saath Nibhaana Saathiya	Radhika	StarPlus
