= Patel Ki Punjabi Shaadi =

2015 Indian Hindi film by Sanjay Chhel

- Directed by: Sanjay Chhel
- Written by: Sanjay Chhel
- Produced by: Bharat Patel; Kalapi Nagada
- Starring: Rishi Kapoor; Paresh Rawal; Vir Das; Payal Ghosh; Prem Chopra; Shilpa Shinde
- Cinematography: Neelabh Kaul; Venugopal
- Edited by: Sanjay Sankla
- Music by: Lalit Pandit; Uttank Vora
- Production company: Bholenath Movies
- Release date: 15 September 2017
- Running time: 120 minutes
- Country: India
- Language: Hindi

Patel Ki Punjabi Shaadi (transl. Patel's Punjabi wedding) is an Indian Hindi romantic comedy film, starring Rishi Kapoor, Paresh Rawal, Vir Das, Payal Ghosh and Prem Chopra. This film is directed by Sanjay Chhel and produced by Bharat Patel of Bholenath Movies. Rishi Kapoor and Paresh Rawal will be seen together for the first time in 20 years. The film which began production in 2014, and was released on 15 September 2017.

== Plot ==
The story is about a Punjabi (Rishi Kapoor) and a Gujarati (Paresh Rawal) whose children are to marry each other. Payal Ghosh will debut as Paresh Rawal's daughter, who plays the love interest of Rishi Kapoor's son, to be played by Vir Das.

== Cast ==
- Rishi Kapoor as Guggi Tandon
- Paresh Rawal as Hasmukh Patel
- Bharati Achrekar as Hasmukh's mother
- Daya Shankar Pandey as inspector Patil
- Jinal Belani as Manisha Patel (Hasmukh's first daughter)
- Payal Ghosh as Pooja Patel (Hasmukh's second daughter), Monty's wife
- Karanvir Bohra as Pankaj Patel or Pet Singh (Hasmukh's son)
- Teejay Sidhu as Pankaj's wife
- Divya Seth as Pummy Tandon (Guggi's wife)
- Rachna Khanna as Pummy's sister
- Vir Das as Monty Tondon (Guggi's son), Pooja's husband
- Prem Chopra as Prem Lal Tandon (Guggi's father)
- Tiku Talsania as Kanti Bhai (as Manisha's father-in-law)
- Darshan Jariwala as KBC Host
- Dilip Joshi as Narrator
- Shilpa Shinde as Dancer (Item Song - "Maro Line")

== Production ==
Production Manager Ganesh Vaghani, Still photography Ashvin Borad, Surat. The film was shot in Mumbai and Surat. They also shoot scenes in the 200-year-old Forbes Gujarati Sabha library in Mumbai.Line producer Atul P.Patel & Ashvin Borad

== Soundtrack ==
No.	Title	Singer(s)	Length
1.	"Meri Mehandi"	Neha Kakkar, Shaan, Parthiv Gohil
2.	"Sitti Maar"	Daler Mehndi, Aishwarya Nigam
3.	"Ankhha Churave"	Sanjeevani, Amitabh Narayan
4.	"Maro Line"	Neha Kakkar, Aishwarya Nigam
5.	"What's Up O Mata Rani"	Shaan, Roop Kumar Rathod
6.	"Punjabi-Gujarati Sagai Song"	Dharin Thakkar
