= Waiting Hai =

Indian streaming television series

- Genre: Crime; Thriller; Drama
- Written by: Shreyas Jain; Prateek Payodhi; Ashish Thomas
- Directed by: Sameer Vidwans
- Starring: Divyenndu; Bhuvan Arora; Kumud Mishra; Harshita Gaur; Sunita Rajwar
- Music by: Daniel B. George
- Country of origin: India
- Original language: Hindi
- No. of seasons: 1
- No. of episodes: 7

Production
- Producers: Ajay Rai; Sana Warsi; Deepak Simhal; Jyoti Deshpande
- Cinematography: Navagat Prakash
- Editor: Nikhil Parihar
- Running time: 47–60 minutes
- Production companies: JAR Pictures; Jio Studios

Original release
- Network: Amazon MX Player
- Release: 16 September 2026

Waiting Hai is a 2026 Indian Hindi-language crime drama television series directed by Sameer Vidwans for Amazon MX Player. The series is produced by Ajay Rai, Sana Warsi, and Deepak Simhal and Jyoti Deshpande under JAR Pictures and Jio Studios. It stars Divyenndu, Bhuvan Arora, Kumud Mishra, Harshita Gaur and Sunita Rajwar.

The series was released on 16 September 2026 on Amazon MX Player.

== Premise ==
Sugam Mishra, a recently enlisted RPF policeman, is assigned to Patna, where he strives to establish himself while coping with his controlling mother and his new marriage. Afroz Hamza, a skilled but socially awkward computer geek, creates software that can effectively book Tatkal tickets, aiming to utilise his abilities to win over the girl he loves. Hamza's uncle Mama sees the economic potential of his program and converts it into a company, establishing a network of brokers to sell certified Tatkal tickets at a premium. As the company expands, Hamza and Mama get more involved in the illicit ticketing network, but Sugam notices inconsistencies and fears a large-scale fraud. Sugam takes matters into his own hands and investigates the network, finally finding and apprehending hundreds of ticket brokers implicated in the scheme. As their organization grows, Hamza and Mama encounter more rivalry, treachery, and personal failures, while Hamza's need for love and recognition complicates his quest of success. Sugam's inquiry finally brings him to the masterminds of the scam. As Hamza prepares to flee to Dubai, Sugam finds him down and puts an end to the Tatkal fraud.

== Cast ==
- Divyenndu as Sugam Mishra
- Bhuvan Arora as Afroz Hamza
- Harshita Gaur as Princy
- Kumud Mishra as Pramukh Tripathi
- Vijay Maurya as Mama
- Sunita Rajwar as Shanti Devi
- Dayashankar Pandey as ASI Lokesh Kumar
- Yashpal Sharma as Bhoora Bhaiya
- Naved Aslam as DRM
- Srushti Tare as Sweety
- Prabhakar Kumar as Nunnu
- Suyog Gorhe as Alok
- Tushar Rungta as Bigul
- Shakti Kumar as Sajjan Kumar
- Saumya Uniyal as Nazia

=== Season 1 ===
Series	Episodes	Originally released
1	7	16 September 2026

No.	Title	Directed by	Original release date
1	"Kitty Tere Pyaar Mein"	Sameer Vidwans	16 September 2026
2	"Scam Ho Gaya Bihar Mein"	Sameer Vidwans	16 September 2026
3	"Yatrigan Kripya Dhyaan Dein"	Sameer Vidwans	16 September 2026
4	"Ek Bihari Sau Pe Bhaari"	Sameer Vidwans	16 September 2026
5	"Sawari samaan Ki Khud Zimmedaar"	Sameer Vidwans	16 September 2026
6	"Gale Laga le Koi"	Sameer Vidwans	16 September 2026
7	"Relampel"	Sameer Vidwans	16 September 2026

== Release ==
The series premiered on 16 September 2026 on Amazon MX Player.

== Reception ==
Archika Khurana of The Times of India gave 3 stars out of 5 and said that "There is enough humour, emotion and suspense to make the journey worthwhile, but Waiting Hai remains a case of a promising premise that doesn't quite reach its full potential." Sumit Rajguru of Times Now rated it 4/5 stars and said that "Waiting Hai, is engaging. The show has its flaws, but they don’t affect the pace and storytelling of the show." Kiran Jain of Amar Ujala rated it 3/5 stars and said that "If you like light-hearted crime dramas set against the backdrop of a small town, then 'Waiting Hai' can be watched. However, the series fails to fully sustain the thrill until the very end that one would expect from this interesting game of tatkal tickets."

Aarti Gupta of Aaj Tak gave 3 stars out of 5 and writes that "'Waiting Hai' is not a perfect scam thriller, but its premise is strong enough to keep you hooked. The hassle of booking a Tatkal ticket is something the middle class struggles with frequently. Connecting this reality to the criminal underworld is an interesting experiment. Divyenndu Sharma and Bhuvan Arora are convincing in their respective roles, delivering some good moments of humor, emotion, and suspense." Gayathri Kallukaran of Eastern Eye writes that "Waiting Hai has a strong and relatable idea at its centre. Turning the frustration of Tatkal ticket booking into a story about technology, corruption and ambition gives the series plenty of potential."
