= Prayanam (2009 film) =

- Directed by: Chandra Sekhar Yeleti
- Screenplay by: Chandra Sekhar Yeleti
- Dialogues by: Chandra Sekhar Yeleti; Radha Krishna Kumar
- Story by: Chandra Sekhar Yeleti
- Produced by: Seeta Yeleti
- Starring: Manoj Manchu; Harika
- Cinematography: Sarvesh Murari
- Edited by: Mohan; Rama Rao; Chandra Shekar G. V.
- Music by: Mahesh Shankar
- Release date: 29 May 2009
- Country: India
- Language: Telugu

Prayanam (English: Travel) is a 2009 Indian Telugu-language film written and directed by Chandra Sekhar Yeleti and starring Manoj Manchu and Payal Ghosh (credited as Harika). It is a romantic drama set in an airport. The movie received positive reviews, but was considered "below average" by Box Office India.

== Plot ==
The film tells the story of a boy and girl who meet for the first time in an airport and fall in love before they board their flights. Dhruv is the boy and Harika is the girl. They are distinctive individuals. Dhruv is a boy who loves to take chances in life. Harika is one who likes to make right choices in life. She is doing a Masters in Lifestyles Design Academy in Malaysia. Right now she is on her way to India to meet a prospective groom whom her parents have chosen for her.

Dhruv falls in love at first sight with Harika when he sees her at the airport. But he has only two hours to make her fall in love with him. The rest of the story is about how he succeeds.

== Cast ==
- Manoj Manchu as Dhruv
- Harika as Harika
- Brahmanandam as Satyanarayana Swamy
- Aamir Tameem as Raman
- Janardhan as Kailash
- Kalpika Ganesh as Moksha
- Daniel

== Production ==
Chandra Sekhar Yeleti wanted to cast a newcomer in the lead but cast Manchu Manoj after he expressed interest in acting in the film. Aamir Tameem and Kalpika Ganesh made their debut with this film. Most of the movie takes place in the Kuala Lumpur International Airport.

== Soundtrack ==
Prayanam

Soundtrack album by Mahesh Shankar
- Released: 12 May 2009
- Recorded: 2009
- Length: 10:22
- Producer: Mahesh Shankar

Mahesh Shankar chronology
Vennela (2005)	Prayanam (2009)	Inkosaari (2010)

The soundtrack features three songs (two bit songs) composed by Mahesh Shankar with lyrics by Ananta Sriram.

Eleven-year-old Amruthavarshini was nominated for 57th Filmfare Award (South) in the Best Female Playback category (Telugu) for the song "Meghamaa".

Track-List
No.	Title	Singer(s)	Length
1.	"Theme Song"	Vishal Dadlani, Ranjith, Smita, Shalini Singh, Mynampati Sreeram Chandra	5:36
2.	"Meghama"	Amruthavarshini	2:25
3.	"Nuvvu Entha"	Smita, Mahesh Shankar, Mynampati Sreeram Chandra	2:21
Total length:			10:22

== Critical reception ==
Jeevi of Idlebrain.com wrote that "On a whole, Prayanam is a different film that caters to multiplex crowds." A critic from 123telugu wrote that the film "has good music, clean comedy and is light on the head." Kishore of Nowrunning.com wrote that "Prayanam is squeaky-clean entertainment and for those that believe in true love and love at first sight. This is the movie of the summer." Maudgalyan of Nowrunning.com wrote that "But for some slackening pace in the second half that ought to have been ruthlessly trimmed, the film is worth much more than a casual window-shopping glance."
