= Hawala (TV series) =

2019 Indian web series by Kowshik Bheemidi

- Genre: Thriller
- Written by: Kowshik Bheemidi
- Directed by: Kowshik Bheemidi
- Starring: Gourish Yeleti; Anusha; Tarun Rohit; Jayasree Kshatriya
- Composer: Anand Sudeep Raj
- Country of origin: India
- Original language: Telugu
- No. of seasons: 1
- No. of episodes: 6

Production
- Producers: Rahul Tamada; Saideep Reddy Borra
- Cinematography: Revanth Levaka
- Editor: P. Anil Kumar
- Running time: 18-20 minutes
- Production company: Tamada Media

Original release
- Network: ZEE5

Hawala is a 2019 Indian Telugu-language thriller web series written and directed by Kowshik Bheemidi. Produced by Rahul Tamada and Saideep Reddy Borra, it stars Gourish Nandan Yeleti, Anusha, Jayasree Kshatriya and Tarun Rohit in lead roles. This six-episode series premiered on 21 November 2019 on ZEE5. It is dubbed into other Indian languages.

== Premise ==
After winning a huge sum of money through cricket betting, Karan (Gourish Nandan Yeleti) gives the Hawala note to Vani (Anusha), for safekeeping. However, they soon realise that another couple, Guna (Tarun Rohit) and Nisha (Jayasree Kshatriya), have stolen the Hawala note and encashed the money. As the chase begins to locate Guna and Nisha, the couple Karan and Vani find themselves in unexpected situations, as they begin to unearth the unexposed world of Hawala.

== Cast ==
- Gourish Nandan Yeleti as Karan
- Anusha as Vani
- Jayasree Kshatriya as Nisha
- Tarun Rohit as Guna
- Anvesh Alluri
- Kushal Goud
- Senegal Patel
- Kowshik Bheemidi
- Nikhil Reddy
- Amar Patel

== Episodes ==
No.	Title	Directed by	Written by	Original release date
1	"That's My Game"	Kowshik Bheemidi	Kowshik Bheemidi	21 November 2019
2	"Note Toh Sahi Tha"	Kowshik Bheemidi	Kowshik Bheemidi	21 November 2019
3	"Hawala Bole Toh Trust"	Kowshik Bheemidi	Kowshik Bheemidi	21 November 2019
4	"Use Bolte Hai Dimaag"	Kowshik Bheemidi	Kowshik Bheemidi	21 November 2019
5	"Green Tea"	Kowshik Bheemidi	Kowshik Bheemidi	21 November 2019
6	"The Final Day"	Kowshik Bheemidi	Kowshik Bheemidi	21 November 2019

== Release ==
The series was released on ZEE5 on 21 November 2019.
