= Loser (TV series) =

2020 Telugu web television

- Directed by: Abhilash Reddy Kankara
- Starring: Priyadarshi; Kalpika Ganesh; Baby Annie; Sayaji Shinde; Shashank (actor); Pavani Gangireddy; Chandra Vempaty
- Music by: Sriram Maddury
- Country of origin: India
- Original language: Telugu
- No. of seasons: 2
- No. of episodes: 18 (list of episodes)

Production
- Cinematography: Naresh Ramadurai
- Production companies: Annapurna Studios; Spectrum Media Networks

Original release
- Network: Zee5
- Release: 15 May 2020

Loser is an Indian Telugu-language sports drama streaming television anthology series of starring Priyadarshi, Kalpika Ganesh, Baby Annie, Sayaji Shinde, Shashank, Pavani Gangireddy and Chandra Vempaty.

== Cast ==
=== Season 1 ===
- Priyadarshi as Suri Yadav
  - Srikar Isetti as young Suri Yadav
- Shashank as Wilson
- Kalpika Ganesh as Ruby Shabana
  - Baby Annie as young Ruby Shabana
- Pavani Gangireddy as Pallavi, Suri's love interest
- Komalee Prasad as Asha, Wilson's wife
- Dr. Malhotra Shivam as Saajid, Ruby's husband.
- Harshith Malgireddy as John, Wilson's son
- Pavan Kumar as Sunny, Suri's younger brother
- Abhay Bethiganti as Tippu Sultan 'Tippu', Suri's Best friend
  - Raahil as young Tippu Sultan 'Tippu'
- Chandra Vempaty as Chenchulayya, Ruby's Badminton Coach
- Sayaji Shinde as Irfan, Ruby's father
- Satya Krishnan as Ruksana, Ruby's mother
- Vasu Inturi as Joseph, Wilson's elder brother
- Jaswica Nemo as Keerthana, young Ruby's best friend
- Viren Thanbidorai as Krishnan Siva Rama Chandran
- Ashok Kumar. K as Ranganath
- Banerjee as Jairaj, Suri's Mentor and Pallavi's father (Cameo appearance)
- Rupa Lakshmi as Pallavi's mother
- Keshav Deepak as Sundar, Wilson's cricket coach
- Dr. Giri as Arjun Sharma
- Sattanna as Sattanna
- Santhosh Singuru
- Siddharth Gollapudi]] as Boss

=== Season 2 ===
- Dhanya Balakrishna as Maya Krishnan Siva Rama Chandran, Krishnan Siva Rama Chandran's daughter
- Sunayana as Adult Keerthana, Ruby's best friend
  - Jaswica Nemo as Young Keerthana
- Ravi Varma as Ravinder, Suri's Shooting Coach
- Venkat as Raghavender (Cameo role)
- Shishir Sharma as Farhan, Saajed's father
- Surya as Govardhan
- Krishna Teja as Bobby
- Karthik Rebba as Elder Parithosh
  - Armaan as Younger Parithosh
- Gayatri Bharghavi as Kaveri, Ruby's Inter college principal.
- Sammetta Gandhi as Toy seller
- Charan Devudula as Karan, Arjun Sharma's son
- Tarak Ponnappa as Vinod, Pallavi's Business partner
- Lakshmi as Gouri
- Giri as Srinu, John's cricket coach and Wilson's Junior in cricket.

== Episodes ==
=== Season 1 ===
No. overall	No. in season	Title	Directed by	Written by	Original release date
1	1	"The Losers"	Abhilash Reddy	Sai Bharadwaj, Shravan Madala and Abhilash Reddy	15 May 2020
2	2	"The Players"	Abhilash Reddy	Sai Bharadwaj, Shravan Madala and Abhilash Reddy	15 May 2020
3	3	"Shattered Dreams"	Abhilash Reddy	Sai Bharadwaj, Shravan Madala and Abhilash Reddy	15 May 2020
4	4	"Bowled Out"	Abhilash Reddy	Sai Bharadwaj, Shravan Madala and Abhilash Reddy	15 May 2020
5	5	"When All is Not Over..!"	Abhilash Reddy	Sai Bharadwaj, Shravan Madala and Abhilash Reddy	15 May 2020
6	6	"A Far-Fetched Goal"	Abhilash Reddy	Sai Bharadwaj, Shravan Madala and Abhilash Reddy	15 May 2020
7	7	"Upside Down"	Abhilash Reddy	Sai Bharadwaj, Shravan Madala and Abhilash Reddy	15 May 2020
8	8	"The Unknown Secret"	Abhilash Reddy	Sai Bharadwaj, Shravan Madala and Abhilash Reddy	15 May 2020
9	9	"The Bitter Truth"	Abhilash Reddy	Sai Bharadwaj, Shravan Madala and Abhilash Reddy	15 May 2020
10	10	"The Winners"	Abhilash Reddy	Sai Bharadwaj, Shravan Madala and Abhilash Reddy	15 May 2020

== Reception ==
The series received generally favourable reviews, with the actors' performances being praised.

=== Season 1 ===
Suhas Yellapantula of The Times of India rated three out of five stars and wrote, "it does warm your heart at times and makes for a breezy watch. It's not a show that will wow you but it's a story worth exploring – more so because it's three stories rolled into one." Sangeetha Devi Dundoo of The Hindu wrote, "The 30-minute duration of each episode works in Loser's favour, as the stories don't get stretched needlessly. The links between the three stories are established beautifully."

=== Season 2 ===
Thadhagath Pathi of The Times of India rated three-and-a-half out of five stars and wrote, "Loser 2 is one such brilliant web-series that deserves your time. It explores the dark side of a highly celebrated profession. Do not miss it, especially if you wonder why India doesn't get as many medals in the Olympics as other countries do." Sangeetha Devi Dundoo of The Hindu wrote, "With all its focus on the emotional journeys of the characters, we don't see enough of sport. But perhaps, this season is meant to build up momentum for season three, the finale, where each of the players has their task cut out."

A critic from The Hans India gave it two-and-a-half out of five stars and wrote, "With missing emotions despite the makers trying to elevate them to the core, Loser 2 for all the efforts failed to live up to the expectations. Artistes performances, background music, camera work and few dialogues tried to make the viewer to watch the series till the ending." Srivathsan Nadadhur of OTTplay gave it two out of five stars and wrote, "Loser Season 2 is better than the first instalment though the writing and the treatment of the story leave a lot to be desired. Priyadarshi continues his good form while Harshith Reddy and Dhanya Balakrishna sparkle in their meaty roles. The show's setup is engrossing and has the right foundation for a nail-biting drama, except that it doesn't make full use of it."
