= Andha Pyaar 2.0 =

- Genre: Reality; Dating show Comedy
- Created by: Kaustubh Agarwal; Vivek Samtani
- Written by: Himanshu Singh
- Directed by: Ashish Bajaj
- Country of origin: India
- Original language: Hindi
- No. of seasons: 1

Production
- Producer: Baneet Chhabra
- Cinematography: Ashish Bajaj
- Editor: Naman Khosla
- Production company: PlayPause Studio

Original release
- Network: ZEE5
- Release: March 14, 2026 – present

Andha Pyar 2.0 – Wingman Edition is an Indian Hindi-language reality dating series that premiered on ZEE5 on 14 March 2026. Created by comedians Vivek Samtani and Kaustubh Agarwal, the show is a social experiment focusing on blind dating where physical appearance is removed from the initial selection process.

== Format ==
The series revolves around the concept of finding love through personality and conversation rather than visual attraction. In each episode, a female protagonist interacts with four potential suitors while wearing a blindfold.

The show is distinguished by its comedic commentary. Creators Vivek Samtani and Kaustubh Agarwal serve as wingmen, guiding the participants through various rounds of questioning and vibe checks. A panel of guest comedians, including Harsh Gujral and Gaurav Kapoor, provides a meta-commentary on the proceedings, often joking about the contestants' red flags and awkward interactions.

== Cast ==
=== Hosts ===
- Vivek Samtani: stand-up comedian and co-creator.
- Kaustubh Agarwal: stand-up comedian and co-creator.

=== Regular panelists ===
- Harsh Gujral
- Gaurav Kapoor
- Gurleen Pannu
- Onkar Yadav
- Shreya Priyam Roy
- Pranav Sharma
- Rajat Sood
- Chirag Panjwani
- Javed Khan
- Aaditya Kulshreshtha

== Production ==
In early 2026, ZEE5 announced the 2.0 version as part of its expansion into Gen Z-centric non-fiction content. The show was produced by Baneet Chhabra and directed by Ashish Bajaj.

== Release ==
The series began streaming on 14 March 2026, with episodes released weekly.
