= Teen Tigada =

2026 Indian Hindi web series

- Genre: Romantic drama; Coming-of-age
- Starring: Prasanna Bisht; Danesh Razvi; Archika Arora; Samarth Mehta; Grusha Kapoor
- Country of origin: India
- Original language: Hindi
- No. of seasons: 1

Production
- Producers: Streetlamp Media Entertainment LLP; I Scream Dreams Media Pvt. Ltd.

Original release
- Network: Zee 5
- Release: 20 November 2026

Teen Tigada is a 2026 Indian Hindi-language romantic drama web series. It stars Prasanna Bisht, Danesh Razvi, Archika Arora, Samarth Mehta and Grusha Kapoor in pivotal roles.

Produced by Streetlamp Media Entertainment LLP and I Scream Dreams Media Pvt. Ltd., the series follows young lovers navigating romance, ambition and an unplanned pregnancy against the contrasting worlds of cricket and music.

Teen Tigada premiered on ZEE5 on 20 November 2026.

== Plot ==
Asmani, an aspiring cricketer, and Manas, an aspiring singer, meet and fall in love while pursuing their respective dreams. Their lives change when a one-night stand results in an unplanned pregnancy.

Faced with responsibilities they had not anticipated, Asmani and Manas must navigate the complexities of their relationship while deciding how to pursue their individual dreams. The series explores the choices, challenges and emotional consequences that come with growing up.

== Cast ==
- Prasanna Bisht as Asmani
- Danesh Razvi as Manas
- Archika Arora
- Samarth Mehta
- Grusha Kapoor

== Production ==
Teen Tigada was produced by Streetlamp Media Entertainment LLP and I Scream Dreams Media Pvt. Ltd. The series is set against the worlds of cricket and music, following young individuals as they pursue their aspirations while navigating relationships and difficult life choices.

== Release ==
The official trailer was released on 16 November 2026. The series premiered on Hindi ZEE5 on 20 November 2026.

== Reception ==
Teen Tigada received mixed-to-negative reviews from critics. Reviewers generally appreciated the performances of Prasanna Bisht and Danesh Razvi and the series' attempt to address young love, ambition and unexpected responsibility, but criticised its writing, pacing, emotional depth and handling of its central conflict.

The Hollywood Reporter India gave the series a negative review, describing it as "an affair to forget". It criticised the series for failing to develop its central relationship and for relying on familiar romantic-drama tropes rather than offering a fresh or emotionally engaging take on its premise.

Filmfare gave the series 2 out of 5 stars. It acknowledged the potential of its campus-romance premise and the chemistry between the lead pair, but felt that the writing did not fully explore the emotional and social consequences of the characters' choices, leaving the series less impactful than it could have been.
