= Ekkadiki Ee Parugu =

Indian web series

- Genre: Crime; Thriller; Drama
- Directed by: Abhilash Reddy Kankara
- Starring: Aryan Rajesh; Shashank; Pavani Gangireddy; Kalpika Ganesh; Chandra Vempaty
- Music by: Sai Sriram Maddury
- Country of origin: India
- Original language: Telugu
- No. of seasons: 2
- No. of episodes: 12 (list of episodes)

Production
- Executive producer: Anudeep Gersappe
- Producers: Raag Gv, Clown Pictures
- Production location: India
- Cinematography: Naresh Ramadurai
- Editors: Anil Kumar Pasala; Ashwath Shivkumar
- Running time: 18–45 minutes

Original release
- Network: ZEE5
- Release: 8 January – 8 February 2019

Ekkadiki Ee Parugu is a 2019 Indian Telugu-language web series starring Aryan Rajesh, Shashank, Pavani Gangireddy, Kalpika Ganesh and Chandra Vempaty . It was directed by Abhilash Reddy Kankara. The premise of this thriller drama which revolves around Madhur Anand (Shashank), a popular chef, whose wife Vaishnavi (Pavani) goes missing. The investigating officer (Aryan Rajesh), who himself is recovering from the recent death of his wife, suspects Madhur to be the perpetrator.

The series premiered on ZEE5 to positive reviews. It was dubbed and released in Tamil as Thadam.

== Premise ==
Madhur Anand, a renowned chef, files a police complaint that his wife, Vaishnavi has gone missing. The investigating police officer who himself is recovering from the recent death of his wife suspects foul play, but he doesn't know if he has enough clues to suspect anyone yet. When he begins to investigate the case, things go terribly wrong when he discovers that Madhur Anand might be lying. If this is not enough, Madhur himself sets out to unravel the mystery about Vaishnavi's life just before her death. The rest of the story is about finding who killed Vaishnavi and what were the circumstances that led to her death.

== Cast ==
- Aryan Rajesh as Investigating officer
- Shashank as Madhur
- Pavani Gangireddy as Vaishnavi
- Kalpika Ganesh as Saira
- Chandra Vempaty as Vamshi
- Bharat Raj as Raj
- Rajsekhar Aningi as Politician
- Sudeep Patil as Restaurant Manager

== Episodes ==
Season	Episodes	Originally released
1	6	January 8, 2019
2	6	February 8, 2019

=== Season 1 ===
No. overall	No. in season	Title	Directed by	Written by	Original release date
1	1	"The End"	Abhilash Reddy	Abhilash Reddy	8 January 2019
2	2	"Lost Love"	Abhilash Reddy	Abhilash Reddy	8 January 2019
3	3	"Project Taskar"	Abhilash Reddy	Abhilash Reddy	8 January 2019
4	4	"The Missing Piece"	Abhilash Reddy	Abhilash Reddy	8 January 2019
5	5	"Deception Point"	Abhilash Reddy	Abhilash Reddy	8 January 2019
6	6	"The Beginning"	Abhilash Reddy	Abhilash Reddy	8 January 2019

=== Season 2 ===
No. overall	No. in season	Title	Directed by	Written by	Original release date
7	1	"Who Am I?"	Abhilash Reddy	Abhilash Reddy	8 February 2019
8	2	"Hide and Seek"	Abhilash Reddy	Abhilash Reddy	8 February 2019
9	3	"The New Unknown"	Abhilash Reddy	Abhilash Reddy	8 February 2019
10	4	"The Arch-enemy"	Abhilash Reddy	Abhilash Reddy	8 February 2019
11	5	"Lost in Translation"	Abhilash Reddy	Abhilash Reddy	8 February 2019
12	6	"Aham Kṛṣṇa"	Abhilash Reddy	Abhilash Reddy	8 February 2019

== Release ==
The web series was released on online streaming platform Zee5 on January 8, 2019.

== Reception ==
Hemanth Kumar of Firstpost praised the performances of Aryan Rajesh and Pavani Gangireddy but termed it a convoluted web-series and said it would have been better as a film, as the director's initial intention. He criticised the narrative and said that the performances in a few scenes were amateurish, but it worked well in its emotional scenes.
