= Vikkatakavi =

Indian thriller series

- Genre: Suspense thriller
- Written by: Saitej Desharaj
- Directed by: Pradeep Maddali
- Starring: Naresh Agastya; Megha Akash
- Music by: Ajay Arasada
- Country of origin: India
- Original language: Telugu

Production
- Producer: Ram Talluri
- Cinematography: Shoeb Siddiqui
- Editor: Sai Babu Talari
- Production company: SRT Entertainments

Original release
- Release: 28 November 2024

Vikkatakavi: The Chronicles of Amaragiri is an Indian Telugu-language thriller streaming television film. Set against the backdrop of 1970s Telangana, the series follows the journey of Ramakrishna, a young detective. The storyline centers on a small village where residents mysteriously begin losing their memories. Ramakrishna, also known as Vikkatakavi, steps in to uncover the mystery.

The series is produced by Ram Talluri of SRT Entertainments and directed by Pradeep Maddali. The lead roles are played by Naresh Agastya and Megha Akash.

== Synopsis ==
The story revolves around Ramakrishna, portrayed by Naresh Agastya, a young detective who is drawn into a mysterious case in the enigmatic kingdom of Amaragiri. Villagers who enter the Nallamalla Forest at night are mysteriously losing their memories, and local legends point to a curse of a goddess. As Ramakrishna delves deeper, he uncovers a complex web of historical conspiracies, political schemes, and the tragic death of the king's son.

== Cast ==
- Naresh Agastya as Ramakrishna
- Megha Akash as princess Lakshmi
- Shiju AR as Raja Narasimha Rao
- Tarak Ponnappa as Mahadeva
- Raghu Kunche as Raghupathi
- Mukthar Khan as Azam Khan
- Amit Tiwari as Joseph/Veeranna
- Santosh Yadav
- RaviTeja Nannimala as Patel
- Ramya Durga Krishna as Gowry
- Ashok Kumar as Ayyagaru
- Rasha Kiramani as Yashodha
- Giridhar as Venkata Ratnam
- Sai Prasanna as Manga
- Latha as Rathamma
- Mihir Talsania as Pakistani Agent episode 5

== Production ==
The makers of Vikkatakavi officially announced the show on the occasion of Ugadi and launched its poster on April 10, 2024. Produced by Ram Talluri under SRT Entertainments and directed by Pradeep Maddali, the series has music composed by Ajay Arasada and a story written by Teja Desraj. The trailer was unveiled by actor Vishwak Sen.

== Release ==
Vikkatakavi premiered on 28 November 2024 on ZEE5. Prior to its release, it was screened at the 55th International Film Festival of India on 23 November 2024. Season 2 of the series, titled Vikkatakavi: The Chronicles of Parasuram, is expected to be released in 2025.

== Episodes ==
=== Season 1 (2024) ===
No.	Title	Directed by	Written by	Original release date
1	"Whispers of the Cursed"	Pradeep Maddali	Saitej Desharaj	28 November 2024
2	"Echoes of the Unseen"	Pradeep Maddali	Saitej Desharaj	28 November 2024
3	"Blood Moon Rising"	Pradeep Maddali	Saitej Desharaj	28 November 2024
4	"Lost Secrets"	Pradeep Maddali	Saitej Desharaj	28 November 2024
5	"Tales of the Unburnt"	Pradeep Maddali	Saitej Desharaj	28 November 2024
6	"Unleashing the Wrath"	Pradeep Maddali	Saitej Desharaj	28 November 2024
