= Raakshasa =

- Genre: Psychological thriller; crime thriller
- Written by: Suhan Prasad; Apoorva Kumar
- Screenplay by: Suhan Prasad; Apoorva Kumar; M M Shrikantha (Dialogues)
- Directed by: Suhan Prasad
- Starring: Vijay Raghavendra; Mayuri Kyatari; Appanna Ramadurga; Avinash Yelandur
- Country of origin: India
- Original language: Kannada
- No. of seasons: 1
- No. of episodes: 7

Production
- Producer: Tharun Sudhir
- Production location: North Karnataka
- Cinematography: Vivan Vidyut
- Editors: A S Aravind; Bhuvanesh Manivannan
- Production company: Tharun Sudhir Kreatiivez

Original release
- Network: ZEE5
- Release: February 20, 2026

Raakshasa is a 2026 Indian Kannada-language psychological crime thriller web series written and directed by Suhan Prasad and produced by Tharun Sudhir. The series features Vijay Raghavendra in his digital streaming debut as a police officer investigating a series of mysterious deaths in North Karnataka. The series premiered on ZEE5 on February 20, 2026.

== Plot ==
Set against the backdrop of North Karnataka, the narrative follows an intense investigation into a series of gruesome deaths initially attributed to crocodile attacks. As the investigation unfolds, the protagonist, a dedicated police officer, uncovers evidence suggesting that the killings may be linked to dark cult rituals and human intervention rather than animal attacks. The series explores the psychological tension between local superstition and forensic reality.

== Cast and characters ==
- Vijay Raghavendra as SI Hanmappa
- Mayuri Kyatari as Jyothi
- Appanna Ramadurga as Yellappa
- Avinash Yelandur as Praveen Kumar
- MS Jahangir as Virupaksha
- Abhijith as Rudrappa
- Hulugappa Kattimani as Ravindra
- Mahadev Hadapad as Beera
- Sushmitha Jagappa

== Production ==
=== Casting ===
In early 2026, it was confirmed that actor Vijay Raghavendra would lead the series, marking his debut in the OTT space.

== Release ==
Raakshasa began streaming on ZEE5 from February 20, 2026.

== Reception ==
Raakshasa received mixed reviews from critics, who largely compared it to its source material, the Tamil series Vilangu. While the North Karnataka setting and Vijay Raghavendra's performance were praised, the show was criticized for its technical execution and lack of originality.

The Times of India called it a "gripping watch" that benefited from a "restrained, internalised performance" by Raghavendra and an atmospheric setting. The Hollywood Reporter India noted that while the pacing was "sturdy," the early reveal in the third episode stripped the later half of its "riveting" potential. Moneycontrol praised the series for adapting the story into the "distinct social fabric" of rural Karnataka, highlighting the "natural" supporting cast.

In a critical review, Deccan Herald rated it 1.5 out of 5 stars, stating it "fell prey to the OTT template" with forced cliffhangers and "amateurish" dubbing. Firstpost gave it 2 out of 5 stars, arguing the show "loses its bite in translation" and suffered from a "generic" visual palette. OTTplay also rated the series 1.5 out of 5, concluding that it "pales in comparison to the original" due to repetitive beats.

The Hans India dismissed the series as a "hollow remake," criticizing the "shallow writing" and uninspired direction. Writing for India Today, the critic noted that while the "central mystery is engaging enough to keep viewers invested," the series suffered from an "amateurish, underproduced quality" and technical issues such as "glaring errors with the dubbing" and grammatical mistakes in the credits.
