= Vilangu (TV series) =

Indian web series

- Official poster
- Genre: Crime thriller
- Written by: Prasanth Pandiyaraj
- Directed by: Prasanth Pandiyaraj
- Starring: Vemal; Ineya; Bala Saravanan; Munishkanth; R. N. R. Manohar; S. S. Chakravarthy; Reshma Pasupuleti
- Music by: Ajesh
- Country of origin: India
- Original language: Tamil
- No. of seasons: 1
- No. of episodes: 7 (list of episodes)

Production
- Producer: P. Madan
- Cinematography: Dinesh P
- Editor: Ganesh Siva
- Production company: Escape Artists

Original release
- Network: Zee5
- Release: 18 February 2022

Vilangu (transl. Handcuffs) is a 2022 Indian Tamil-language crime thriller streaming television series produced as an Original for Zee5, directed by Prasanth Pandiyaraj of Bruce Lee fame. Produced by Escape Artists the series stars Vemal in the lead role along with Ineya, Bala Saravanan, Munishkanth and R. N. R. Manohar. The series comprised seven episodes and was released on Zee5 on 18 February 2022. This series was remade in Bengali as Bibhishon, in Hindi as Janaawar – The Beast Within and in Kannada as Raakshasa (2026) and in Telugu as Rudravanam PS (2026).

== Synopsis ==
Ilamparithi, a sub-inspector at the Vembur Police Station, in the outskirts of Trichy, is unable to balance his personal and professional life and it is the latter that consumes most of his time. A jewellery theft in a house, a decomposed dead body without a head, a cold-blooded murder - all three crimes that happen back to back, fall under the Vembur Police jurisdiction and the crimes are being investigated by Paridhi and his team of Police officers including Karuppu, Uthaman, and others. As they set out to find the killer, they are welcomed by a series of unexpected events. Who is responsible for the murders that happened in the village and what was the outcome of the police investigation?

== Cast ==
- Vemal as Ilamparithi
- Ineya as Revathi
- Bala Saravanan as Karuppu
- Munishkanth as SI Uthaman
- R. N. R. Manohar as Inspector Kodilingam
- S. S. Chakravarthy as DSP Vaidhyanathan
- Reshma Pasupuleti as Selvi
- Ravi as Kitchaan
- Rajapandi as Kitchaan's Friend
- Sai Umesh
- Yogi

== Reception ==
The series opened to extreme positive reviews. Vignesh Madhu of Cinema Express rated the series with 3/5 stars, stating that, "The word Vilangu is an apt title for a series which is about cops as well as a deceitful man, who hides a beast in him. Leaving aside the horrifying violence, the convenient plot points, and the insipid 'family' scenes, Vilangu makes for a compelling watch." Behindwoods gave a rating of 3 out on 5 and wrote, "Strong performances from Vemal and Bala Saravanan, Ajesh's music and Prasanth's clever writing together propel Vilangu to a must watch zone." The News Minute wrote, "Vilangu makes for a gripping watch because it downplays its surprises intelligently, and doesn’t fall back on flashy, unrealistic reveals that revolve around a hero cop (the background score, too, is committed to the plot and not Paruthi). It’s a cat and mouse game where we aren’t sure until the end who is the cat and who is the mouse. Well played." OTTplay.com rated the series with 3.5/5 stars, called the series an edge-of-the-seat thriller. Binged.com gave a rating of 6.25 out on 10 and wrote the film as Slow Paced But Engaging Police Procedural Thriller. Galatta said "Vilangu is truly a comeback of sorts for Vemal and director Prasanth Pandiyaraj!" and rated the series 3/5 stars.

== Home media ==
The satellite rights was purchased by Zee Tamil and aired the web series as a special movie presentation on 20 February 2022.

== Episodes ==
| No. overall | No. in season | Title | Directed by | Written by | Original release date |
|---|---|---|---|---|---|
| 1 | 1 | "Section 174" | Prasanth Pandiyaraj | Prasanth Pandiyaraj | 18 February 2022 |
Sub-Inspector Paridhi is supposed to be on leave. But circumstances lead him to take charge of routine cases at the Vembur police station, and soon as unexpected call makes the routine in the station go for a toss.
| 2 | 2 | "The Torch" | Prasanth Pandiyaraj | Prasanth Pandiyaraj | 18 February 2022 |
Paridhi is in a race against time to find the criminal and solve the case. But when he finds himself at a crossroad as a personal emergency demands his time and attention, Karuppu has the answers.
| 3 | 3 | "The Hunt Widens" | Prasanth Pandiyaraj | Prasanth Pandiyaraj | 18 February 2022 |
The uprooted evidence further complicates the case, and while the investigation gains pace, the new leads only create more complexities. Paridhi and the team form many theories, but an unexpected situation awaits them.
| 4 | 4 | "Handcuffed" | Prasanth Pandiyaraj | Prasanth Pandiyaraj | 18 February 2022 |
Paridhi's unexpected finding solidifies the case and reaffirms that they are on the right track. Paridhi believes he has found the culprit, but the suspect brings to light what Paridhi has overlooked.
| 5 | 5 | "An Unconventional Interrogation" | Prasanth Pandiyaraj | Prasanth Pandiyaraj | 18 February 2022 |
Paridhi is sure he has found the right man and handcuffs him. But the lack of evidence threatens to derail his efforts. Desperate to save himself, Paridhi takes the unconventional route.
| 6 | 6 | "The Ordeal" | Prasanth Pandiyaraj | Prasanth Pandiyaraj | 18 February 2022 |
Paridhi is very close to solving the case, but his unconventional approach puts him into trouble. With his investigation losing pace and time running out, can Paridhi find a way out?
| 7 | 7 | "The Last Piece of the Puzzle" | Prasanth Pandiyaraj | Prasanth Pandiyaraj | 18 February 2022 |
Paridhi has managed to solve the challenge that popped up during the investigation, but he still needs to find answers to the first question that launched the case. Can he find this last piece of information that can make his world normal again?
