= Sparsh Shrivastava =

Indian actor (born 1999)

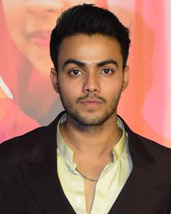
- Shrivastava in 2024
- Born: Rajakhera, Dholpur district, Rajasthan, India
- Occupation: Actor
- Years active: 2010–present

Sparsh Shrivastava is an Indian actor known for his work in Hindi television and films. He gained early recognition for his role in the television soap opera Balika Vadhu (2015–2016). He has since starred in the Netflix crime drama series Jamtara – Sabka Number Ayega (2020–2022), the comedy-drama film Laapataa Ladies (2024), and the Amazon Prime Video series Dupahiya (2025).

== Background ==
Sparsh Shrivastava was born to Ragini and Dinesh Shrivastava in Rajakhera, Dholpur district, Rajasthan. After his birth, his family moved to Agra, Uttar Pradesh. He has an elder brother, Shubham, who is married. His mother, Ragini, lives with him in Mumbai, while the other family members stay in Agra.

== Filmography ==
=== Films ===
Year	Title	Role	Notes	Ref.
2020	Natkhat	Sonu's uncle	Short film	
2021	Collar Bomb	Shoeb Ali		
2024	Laapataa Ladies	Deepak Kumar		
2024	Ae Watan Mere Watan	Fahad		
2026	Vibe	Bhagirath "Bugs" Bhargav		
2026	Vrushakarma †	TBA	Telugu debut film	

=== Television ===
Year	Title	Role	Notes	Ref.
2010	Chak Dhoom Dhoom	Contestant	Winner	
2012	Fear Files: Darr Ki Sacchi Tasvirein	Tarun	Season 1; Episode 34	
2013	Shake It Up	Neeladri "Neel" Walia		
2015–2016	Balika Vadhu	Young Kundan Singh		
2017	Sher-E-Punjab: Maharaja Ranjit Singh	Rajkumar Gulab Singh		
2018	Prithvi Vallabh - Itihaas Bhi, Rahasya Bhi	Unknown		
2018	Apharan	Unnamed		
2019	Black Coffee	Arjun		
2025	Dupahiya	Bhugol		

=== Music video appearances ===
Year	Title	Singer	Ref.
2024	"Saccha Wala Pyaar"	Tulsi Kumar, Vishal Mishra	

== Awards and nominations ==
Year	Award	Category	Work	Result	Ref
2024	Indian Film Festival of Melbourne	Best Actor	Laapataa Ladies	Nominated	
2024	Filmfare OTT Awards	Best Actor in a Web Original Film (Male)	Ae Watan Mere Watan	Nominated	
2025	25th IIFA Awards	Best Actor in a Leading Role (Male)	Laapataa Ladies	Nominated	
2025	70th Filmfare Awards	Best Male Debut	Laapataa Ladies	Nominated	
2025	70th Filmfare Awards	Best Actor (Critic)	Laapataa Ladies	Nominated	
