= Heartiley Battery =

Tamil-language romantic science fiction comedy web series

- Genre: Romantic comedy Science fiction
- Written by: Sadhasivam Senthilrajan
- Directed by: Sadhasivam Senthilrajan
- Starring: Guru Lakshman; Padine Kumar
- Music by: Micheal Akash D.
- Country of origin: India
- Original language: Tamil

Production
- Producers: Edwin Louis Viswanath; Sharanya L. Sharma; Raja D. S.
- Cinematography: Coolie Soundherrajan
- Editor: Nizam
- Production companies: Elysium Maxima India; Allo Media

Original release
- Network: ZEE5

Heartiley Battery is a Tamil-language romantic science fiction comedy web series written and directed by Sadhasivam Senthil Rajan. The series stars Guru Lakshman and Padine Kumar. The series premiered on ZEE5 on 16 December 2025.

== Plot ==
The narrative centers on a brilliant scientist named Sofia, played by Padine Kumar, who firmly believes that love is merely a mix of biological and chemical reactions and can be measured to avoid heartbreak. She even invents a device called a "Love Meter". This scientific perspective is challenged by Sid, a fun-loving comic writer, who is a strong believer in the instinct, magic, and emotions of love. The story unfolds as their contrasting worldviews collide and they inevitably develop feelings for each other.

== Cast and characters ==
- Guru Lakshman as Siddharth
- Padine Kumar as Sofia
- Anith Yashpaul as Ram
- Sumithra as Navya
- Jeeva Ravi as Sofia's father
- Sharmila as Sofia's mother
- Iniyal as Leela

== Production ==
The series was produced by Edwin Louis Viswanath and Sharanya L. Sharma, with Raja D. S., under the banners of Elysium Maxima and Allo Media.

== Release ==
The official trailer for the series was launched by Vijay Antony and Aju Varghese on 8 December 8 2025. The series premiered on ZEE5 on 16 December 2025.
