= Isakapatnam =

- Written by: Prashant Ragathi
- Directed by: Garry BH
- Starring: P. Samuthirakani; Aishwarya Rajesh; Sunil; Rajeev Kanakala
- Music by: Iniyan C S
- Country of origin: India
- Original language: Telugu
- No. of seasons: 1
- No. of episodes: 7

Production
- Producers: Saideep Reddy Borra; Rahul Tamada
- Cinematography: Vamsi Patchipulusu
- Camera setup: Multi Camera
- Running time: 35-42 minutes

Original release
- Network: Amazon Prime Video
- Release: 2 July 2026

Isakapatnam is a 2026 Amazon Prime Video-original Telugu language streaming television series written by Sasidhar Munnangi and directed by Garry BH. The series stars P. Samuthirakani and Aishwarya Rajesh in lead roles.

== Cast ==
- P. Samuthirakani as Naidu
- Aishwarya Rajesh as Bharathi
- Naresh Agastya as Peddanna
- Banerjee as Kottayya
- Rajeev Kanakala as Chinna Rao
- Sunil as CI Varma
- Mime Gopi as Thangavelu
- Merin Philip as Ammaji
- Rohini as Vijaya Bharathi
- Raja Chembolu as Shekhar
- Sudhakar Komakula as Soori
- Jwala Koti as Pothana
- Shanmukh as Jaggudu
- Charan Kurugonda as Moses
- Kalyan Vitappu as Lawyer Niangji
- Eshwar Rachiraju as Raju
- Subhodayam Subbarao
- Rajasekhar Aningi as Chakrapani
- Dayanand Reddy as CI Satya
- Ramesh Ravuri as MLA Diwakaram
- Nalla Sreedhar Reddy Gabbar as Police Commissioner
- Harsha Gangavarapu as Dharma

== Release ==
The series premiered on 2 July 2026at Amazon Prime Video.

== Critical reception ==
The Hollywood Reporter India reviewer Sruthi Ganapathy Raman felt the series doesn't "facilitate any real sort of development in the writing to make these characters come alive." India Today reviewer Anisha Rao wrote "There are moments when the middle episodes slow down, particularly while fleshing out character backstories."

Scroll.in reviewer Udita Jhunjhunwala wrote that the series "mistakes big dramatic gestures for meaningful storytelling."
