= Shivlok Ke Kundakka-Mandakka =

- Genre: Animation; Comedy; Mythology
- Created by: Arushi Govil; Dalbir Singh
- Based on: The Very, Extremely, Most Naughty Asura Tales for Kids! by Anand Neelakantan
- Written by: Saurin Desai; Krishna K. Agrawal; Rakesh Chhabra
- Directed by: Arushi Govil; Dalbir Singh
- Country of origin: India
- No. of seasons: 10

Production
- Producer: Kayhan Enterprises
- Production company: Kayhan TV Entertainment

Original release
- Network: ZEE5 (KidZ)
- Release: 17 July 2026

Shivlok Ke Kundakka Mandakka is an Indian animated children's television series based on The Very, Extremely, Most Naughty Asura Tales for Kids, a book by the writer Anand Neelakantan. It premiered on ZEE5's KidZ platform on 17 July 2026, in Hindi, Tamil, Telugu, Kannada, Bengali and English.

== Premise ==
The series follows Kundakka and Mandakka, twin Asura brothers known for their pranks. Their mother, Rambhika, sends them to the Asura Gurukul, hoping its discipline will improve their behaviour, but the twins clash with older students and their teacher, Guru Mantasari. They form a bond with another teacher, Rutvija, who is half-human and half-Asura.

While exploring a restricted chamber at the school, the twins accidentally awaken the spirits of past Asura warriors, including Raktbeej and Dhoomralochan. This leads them on a series of adventures beyond the Gurukul, in which they encounter various creatures, including a talking goat named Nakura, and learn more about Asura history.

The twins' father, Mahakunda, also appears in the series, and later episodes introduce a wider threat connected to the Gurukul.

== Background ==
The series airs on KidZ, ZEE5's children's programming block. Neelakantan has written several books reinterpreting figures from Hindu mythology, including Asura: Tale of the Vanquished.

== Release ==
ZEE5 released a trailer for the series in the second week of July 2026.

== Episodes ==
No. overall	No. in season	Title	Directed by	Written by	Original release date
1	1	"Welcome to the Gurukul"	Arushi Govil and Dalbir Singh	Saurin Desai, Krishna K. Agrawal and Rakesh Chhabra	17 July 2026
Kundakka and Mandakka are sent to the Asura Gurukul, where they clash with the student Gajasur and the senior students on their first day and are tricked into entering a restricted memorial chamber.
2	2	"Two Boys, Two Ghosts"	Arushi Govil and Dalbir Singh	Saurin Desai, Krishna K. Agrawal and Rakesh Chhabra	17 July 2026
The spirits of Raktbeej and Dhoomralochan possess the twins inside the memorial chamber. As their consciousness is drawn into memories of past battles, their possessed bodies overpower the senior students at the Gurukul.
3	3	"Trial of the Ancients"	Arushi Govil and Dalbir Singh	Saurin Desai, Krishna K. Agrawal and Rakesh Chhabra	17 July 2026
Mandakka proposes a new battle strategy to Raktbeej, helping the twins break free of the spirits' control. Guru Mantasari punishes them and the senior students by sending them into the jungle to find a creature believed not to exist.
4	4	"The Cursed King"	Arushi Govil and Dalbir Singh	Saurin Desai, Krishna K. Agrawal and Rakesh Chhabra	17 July 2026
Trapped by the creature Kanmashpada, Mandakka distracts him while the other students escape. The twins put themselves at risk to protect the group.
5	5	"Rise of Ku-Mandakka"	Arushi Govil and Dalbir Singh	Saurin Desai, Krishna K. Agrawal and Rakesh Chhabra	17 July 2026
When Rutvija is overpowered by Kanmashpada, the twins intervene and discover a new ability that lets them merge into a combined form, Ku-Mandakka, defeating the creature. They later leave the Gurukul and become lost in the jungle.
6	6	"Goat Becomes G.O.A.T."	Arushi Govil and Dalbir Singh	Saurin Desai, Krishna K. Agrawal and Rakesh Chhabra	17 July 2026
Surrounded by tigers, the twins discover they can summon weapons and rescue a goat named Nakura, who becomes their companion. Nakura reveals he was once a childhood companion of Bhasmasur.
7	7	"The General's Ultimatum"	Arushi Govil and Dalbir Singh	Saurin Desai, Krishna K. Agrawal and Rakesh Chhabra	17 July 2026
Mahakunda returns from war and learns of the twins' new abilities. Dissatisfied with Guru Mantasari's teaching, he forbids Kundakka and Mandakka from returning to the Gurukul.
8	8	"The Mother's Wrath"	Arushi Govil and Dalbir Singh	Saurin Desai, Krishna K. Agrawal and Rakesh Chhabra	17 July 2026
The twins challenge Mahakunda to prove the value of their training. A confrontation between Mahakunda and Rutvija leads Ku-Mandakka to intervene, and Mahakunda is later abducted by three figures posing as Devas, aided by an unidentified fourth figure.
9	9	"The Invisible Ambush"	Arushi Govil and Dalbir Singh	Saurin Desai, Krishna K. Agrawal and Rakesh Chhabra	17 July 2026
The twins join Balbeej and Sookshmlochan on a mission to rescue Mahakunda. During the confrontation, Ku-Mandakka discovers the ability to absorb another Asura's energy and uses it to revive their father.
10	10	"The Ultimate Betrayal"	Arushi Govil and Dalbir Singh	Saurin Desai, Krishna K. Agrawal and Rakesh Chhabra	17 July 2026
Ku-Mandakka defeats the three attackers using their own powers against them. When the twins confront Shukracharya over his role in the conspiracy, he uses Nishkashanam to separate them, sending Kundakka to a mountain of ice and Mandakka to a distant ocean island.
