= Chaar Yaar =

Chaar Yaar or Char Yaar (meaning "Four Friends" in Persian) is used to refer to:

- Rashidun, the Rightly Guided Caliphs, used in Sunni Islam to refer to the first four Caliphs who established the Rashidun Caliphate
  - Abu Bakr (632–634), through his daughter Aisha, became a father-in-law of Muhammad.
  - Umar (634–644), through his daughter Hafsa bint Umar, became a father-in-law of Muhammad.
  - Uthman (644–656), by marrying Ruqayya bint Muhammad and Umm Kulthum bint Muhammad, two daughters of Muhammad, became a son-in-law of Muhammad.
  - Ali (656–661), by marrying Fatima and Umama bint Abi al-As, daughter and granddaughter of Muhammad, became a son-in-law of Muhammad.
- The great pioneers of the 13th century Chishti Order and the Suhrawardiyya Sufi movements in South Asia were four friends known as the Chaar Yaar. The original four were:
  - Bahauddin Zakariya of Multan (1170–1267 AD)
  - Baba Farid of Pakpattan (1174–1266 AD)
  - Lal Shahbaz Qalandar, a.k.a. Jhulelal of Sehwan (1177–1274 AD)
  - Jalaluddin Surkh-Posh Bukhari of Uch (c. 1192–1291 AD)
- However, later on, there were more than just four of them in Punjabi Sufi iconography. Including Khwaja Moinuddin Chisti, they include:
  - Mu'in al-Din Chishti of Ajmer (1141–1230 AD)
  - Nizamuddin Auliya of Delhi (1238–1325 AD)
