= Janaawar – The Beast Within =

2025 Indian crime drama streaming series

- Genre: Crime drama
- Written by: Shreyas Lowlekar; Sonalii Gupta Srivastava
- Screenplay by: Shreyas Lowlekar
- Directed by: Sachindra Vats
- Starring: Bhuvan Arora; Bhagwan Tiwari; Atul Kale; Vinod Suryavanshi; Eshika Dey
- Music by: Sreejith Edavana
- Country of origin: India
- Original language: Hindi
- No. of seasons: 1
- No. of episodes: 7

Production
- Producers: Abhishek Rege; Harish Shah; Dinesh Khetann
- Cinematography: Rahul Nayak
- Editor: Shachindra Vats
- Production company: Aarambh Entertainment Pvt Ltd

Original release
- Network: ZEE5
- Release: 26 September 2025 – present

Janaawar – The Beast Within is an Indian crime drama streaming television series directed by Sachindra Vats and starring Bhuvan Arora. The series follows a police investigation into a string of brutal murders in the fictional town of Chhand. It premiered on 26 September 2025 on ZEE5. It is a remake of the 2022 Tamil series Vilangu.

== Premise ==
Set in the restless town of Chhand, the series follows Sub-Inspector Hemant Kumar as he investigates a case that expands into multiple killings. The narrative explores themes of identity, prejudice and survival while confronting entrenched social hierarchies.

== Cast ==
- Bhuvan Arora as SI Hemant Kumar
- Bhagwan Tiwari as DSP Anirudh Pathak
- Atul Kale as Inspector Dayanand Kosle
- Vinod Suryavanshi as Motilal Sharma
- Eshika Dey as ASI Vimla Ecka
- Badrul Islam as Kailash
- Deeksha Sonalkar Tham as Garima Hemant Kumar
- Niti Kaushik as Manda
- Amit Sharma as Constable Bichindra
- Vaibhav Yashvir as ASI Balwant Pandey
- Vinod Suryavanshi as Motilal Sharma
- Aaradhya Sahu as Garima Sahu
- Alok Mishra as MLA Jagtap
- Pushpendra Singh as Ganesh Chandrakar

== Episodes ==
No.	Title	Directed by	Original release date
1	"Devta Aur Dand"	Shachindra Vats	26 September 2025
SI Hemant’s request for leave is cancelled when he is tasked with two urgent investigations: the disappearance of MLA Jagtap’s brother, Sarju, and a gold theft. The case escalates when a mutilated body is discovered in the forest.
2	"Aur Ek Ganth"	Shachindra Vats	26 September 2025
Hemant and his team search for the missing head of the corpse. Shambhu, a local man, is detained and interrogated harshly. Meanwhile, Hemant’s wife Garima gives birth to their son.
3	"Jaati, Kabhi Nahi Jaati"	Shachindra Vats	26 September 2025
The protests of tribal villagers over Shambhu’s arrest intensify as the mystery surrounding Sarju’s death grows deeper. Hemant struggles with the tension between his personal identity and his duty as an officer.
4	"Purana Paap"	Shachindra Vats	26 September 2025
Mamaji and Gopi are arrested in connection with Sarju’s murder and confess under pressure, but Hemant notices irregularities in their account. To his shock, the evidence begins to point towards Kailash, a long-trusted ally of the police.
5	"Apsara"	Shachindra Vats	26 September 2025
Kailash is taken into custody and reveals details about his wife, Manda, and his connection to Sarju’s case. The disclosure unsettles Hemant and raises further questions about the true chain of events.
6	"Aur Kaun?"	Shachindra Vats	26 September 2025
The team is stunned by Kailash’s confession, but new revelations suggest the case is far from solved. Suspecting Kailash’s involvement in additional crimes, Hemant devises a strategy to test his claims.
7	"Sala, Janaawar!"	Shachindra Vats	26 September 2025
Kailash retracts parts of his statement, alleging coercion by the DSP. Hemant faces the threat of being transferred to a Naxal-affected area and, burdened by family concerns, pleads with Kailash to protect his son’s future.

== Release ==
ZEE5 announced that the series would premiere on 26 September 2025.

== Reception ==
Pritinanda Behera of India Today rated the series 3.5 out of 5 and described Janaawar: The Beast Within as a gripping crime drama that interweaves suspense with the realities of caste and identity in small-town India. She praised Bhuvan Arora’s portrayal of Sub-Inspector Hemant Kumar as mature and humane, noting that his bond with a tea-seller facing caste bias was one of the most moving aspects of the series. A reviewer from Scroll.in remarked that "Bhuvan Arora, who is usually cast in supporting roles, turns out an efficient performance as the dedicated cop." Shreyas Pande of Cinema Express rated the show 2 out of 5, noting that "The show needed to be a bit more open, a bit less hesitant and a tad more dense to be true to the bleak nature of its themes. Right now, it just brushes away the conflict. The plot doesn’t thicken; the ideas don’t marinate. It just remains a sum total of its parts but never quite comes together as a whole".

Sreeparna Sengupta from The Times of India rated the series 3 out of 5 stars, writing that "This crime-thriller series keeps the intrigue going but falters in places". Abhishek Srivastava of Moneycontrol gave it 3 out of 5, describing the series as "raw, uneven but engaging," acknowledging its flaws in execution but crediting its exploration of caste and morality for elevating it beyond a routine thriller. Arpita Sarkar of OTTPlay rated the show 3 out of 5 and observed that it delivered a "predictable tale of haunting crime, humanity, and survival," praising Arora’s acting but suggesting the writing left little room for surprise. Troy Ribeiro of The Free Press Journal wrote that "this is not the beast that will devour you, but it will nibble at your curiosity until you’ve clicked through all episodes. A solid binge, if not a lasting memory."

Sumit Rajguru of Times Now rated the series 2 out of 5 and labeled it "a twisted tale that tests patience," criticizing its slow burn and occasional lack of narrative clarity. Vinamra Mathur of Firstpost gave it 3 out of 5 emphasizing Arora’s performance as the most impressive aspect, describing the series as an atmospheric whodunit that stood out despite familiar tropes. Rekha Khan of Navbharat Times highlighted the show’s rootedness in rural India and its focus on caste issues, noting that the authenticity of its setting and performances were its strongest points. Navodaya Times echoed this view, praising the rural setting and performances while underlining its commentary on caste.
