= Irrfan Khan filmography =

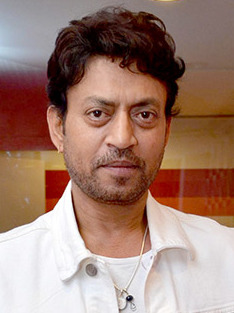
Khan in 2015

Irrfan Khan (7 January 1967 – 29 April 2020) was an Indian actor who worked in Indian and British-American films. His on-screen debut was a minor role in Mira Nair's Salaam Bombay! in 1988. He followed this with appearances in a variety of television shows in the late 1980s to 1990s including playing ʽAbd al-Qadir Badayuni in Bharat Ek Khoj (1988), Makhdoom Mohiuddin in Kahkashan (1991), Vladimir Lenin in Lal Ghas Per Neele Ghodey (1992), a dual role in Chandrakanta (1994), and Valmiki in Jai Hanuman (1997). Khan found his television work unfulfilling and considered quitting acting.

His career experienced a turnaround with his breakthrough role as the lead in Asif Kapadia's The Warrior (2001), which won the BAFTA Award for Outstanding British Film. He followed this with critically acclaimed villainous roles in Haasil and Maqbool (both in 2003). For the former performance, where he played a devious politician, Khan received the Filmfare Award for Best Performance in a Negative Role. In 2006, Khan portrayed a first-generation Bengali immigrant in the Nair-directed film The Namesake with Tabu and a hitman in The Killer. The following year, he won the Filmfare Award for Best Supporting Actor for his performance as a 38-year-old man waiting to marry the right woman in Life in a... Metro, directed by Anurag Basu. In 2008, he received international recognition for his role as a police inspector in Danny Boyle's Slumdog Millionaire, which won the Academy Award for Best Picture.

Khan played the eponymous athlete-turned-bandit in Paan Singh Tomar and the adult version of the title character in Ang Lee's Life of Pi (both in 2012). For the former, he won the National Film Award for Best Actor; the latter was a critically acclaimed commercial success. In 2013, he portrayed a widower who pursues an epistolary romance with a married woman in The Lunchbox with Nimrat Kaur. The film, which he also produced, was a commercial success and received critical acclaim. Three years later, he played supporting roles in Haider, Jurassic World, Piku, and the television miniseries Tokyo Trial, in which he portrayed the jurist Radhabinod Pal. In 2017, his performance as a father trying to get a place for his daughter in an elite English-medium school in Hindi Medium garnered him the Filmfare Award for Best Actor and also became his highest-grossing Hindi release. Khan starred as a widower in Angrezi Medium (2020). It was to be his final role as he died later in the same year, aged 53. He posthumously won Best Actor and Lifetime Achievement at the 66th Filmfare Awards.

== Film ==
List of Irrfan Khan film credits
| Year | Title | Role(s) | Language(s) | Notes | Ref(s) |
|---|---|---|---|---|---|
| 1988 | Salaam Bombay! | Letter writer | Hindi | | |
| 1989 | Kamla Ki Maut | Ajit | Hindi | | |
| 1990 | Drishti | Rahul | Hindi | | |
| 1990 | Ek Doctor Ki Maut | Amulya | Hindi | | |
| 1991 | Pita | Unknown | Hindi | | |
| 1992 | Mujhse Dosti Karoge | | Hindi | | |
| 1993 | Karamati Coat | Jaggu | Hindi | | |
| 1994 | The Cloud Door | Unknown | Hindi | Short film | |
| 1994 | Vaade Iraade | Naresh | Hindi | | |
| 1994 | Purush | Siddharth | Hindi | | |
| 1997 | Private Detective: Two Plus Two Plus One | Inspector Khan | Hindi | | |
| 1998 | Such A Long Journey | Gustad's Father | English | | |
| 1998 | Bada Din | Police Inspector | Hindi | | |
| 1999 | The Goal | Anupam Singh | Hindi | | |
| 2000 | Ghaath | Romesh "Mamu" Bhagwat Dogra | Hindi | | |
| 2001 | Kasoor | Nitin Mehta | Hindi | | |
| 2001 | The Warrior | Lafcadia | Hindi | | |
| 2002 | Kali Salwar | Shankar | Hindi | | |
| 2002 | Gunaah | Pandey | Hindi | | |
| 2002 | Pratha | Nimi Pandey | Hindi | | |
| 2002 | Haathi Ka Anda | Unknown | Hindi | | |
| 2002 | Bokshu – The Myth | High Priest | English | | |
| 2003 | Dhund | Ajit Khurana | Hindi | | |
| 2003 | Haasil | Ranvijay Singh | Hindi | Filmfare Award for Best Actor in a Negative Role | |
| 2003 | Supari | Baba | Hindi | | |
| 2003 | Footpath | Sheikh | Hindi | | |
| 2003 | The Bypass | Policeman | Hindi | Short film | |
| 2003 | Maqbool | Miyan Maqbool | Hindi | | |
| 2003 | Road To Ladakh | Shafiq | Hindi | Short film | |
| 2004 | Charas | Randhir Singh Rathore | Hindi | | |
| 2004 | Aan: Men at Work | Yusuf Pathan | Hindi | | |
| 2004 | Shadows of Time | Yani | Bengali | | |
| 2005 | Rog | Inspector Uday Rathore | Hindi | First lead role | |
| 2005 | Chehraa | Chandranath Diwan | Hindi | | |
| 2005 | Chocolate | Pipi | Hindi | | |
| 2005 | 7½ Phere | Manoj Joshi | Hindi | | |
| 2005 | The Film | Shameem Bhai | Hindi | Voice only | |
| 2006 | Yun Hota Toh Kya Hota | Salim Rajabali | Hindi | | |
| 2006 | The Killer | Vikram | Hindi | | |
| 2006 | Deadline: Sirf 24 Ghante | Krish Vaidya | Hindi | | |
| 2006 | Mr. 100% | Vishal | Hindi | | |
| 2006 | Sainikudu | Pappu Yadav | Telugu | | |
| 2007 | Partition | Avtar | English | | |
| 2007 | A Mighty Heart | Javed Habib | English | | |
| 2007 | The Darjeeling Limited | The Father | English | | |
| 2007 | The Namesake | Ashoke Ganguli | English-Bengali | | |
| 2007 | Life in a... Metro | Monty | Hindi | Filmfare Award for Best Supporting Actor | |
| 2007 | Apna Asmaan | Ravi Kumar | Hindi | | |
| 2007 | Aaja Nachle | Farooque | Hindi | Special appearance | |
| 2008 | Tulsi | Suraj | Hindi | | |
| 2008 | Sunday | Kumar Mangat | Hindi | | |
| 2008 | One Two Three | Narrator | Hindi | | |
| 2008 | Krazzy 4 | Dr. Mukherjee | Hindi | | |
| 2008 | Mumbai Meri Jaan | Thomas | Hindi | | |
| 2008 | Chamku | Vishal Kapoor | Hindi | | |
| 2008 | Dil Kabaddi | Samit | Hindi | | |
| 2008 | Slumdog Millionaire | Police Inspector | English | | |
| 2008 | Migration | Unknown | Hindi | Short film | |
| 2008 | New York, I Love You | Mansukhbhai | English | Anthology film Segment: "Mira Nair" | |
| 2009 | Billu | Billu | Hindi | | |
| 2009 | New York | Roshan | Hindi | | |
| 2009 | Acid Factory | Kaiser | Hindi | | |
| 2010 | Right Yaaa Wrong | Inspector Vinay Patnaik | Hindi | | |
| 2010 | Knock Out | Tony Khosla | Hindi | | |
| 2010 | Hisss | Inspector Vikram Gupta | Hindi | | |
| 2011 | Yeh Saali Zindagi | Arun | Hindi | | |
| 2011 | 7 Khoon Maaf | Wasiullah "Musafir" Khan | Hindi | | |
| 2011 | Thank You | Vikram Chopra | Hindi | | |
| 2012 | Paan Singh Tomar | Paan Singh Tomar | Hindi | National Film Award for Best Actor; Filmfare Critics Award for Best Actor | |
| 2012 | The Amazing Spider-Man | Dr. Rajit Ratha | English | | |
| 2012 | Life of Pi | Piscine Molitor Patel, adult | English | | |
| 2013 | Saheb, Biwi Aur Gangster Returns | Indrajeet Pratap Singh | Hindi | | |
| 2013 | The Lunchbox | Saajan Fernandes | Hindi | Also producer | |
| 2013 | D-Day | Wali Khan | Hindi | | |
| 2013 | Qissa | Umber Singh | Hindi | | |
| 2014 | Gunday | ACP Satya | Hindi | | |
| 2014 | The Xposé | Alec D'Costa / Narrator | Hindi | Cameo appearance | |
| 2014 | Haider | Roohdaar | Hindi | | |
| 2015 | Piku | Rana Chaudhary | Hindi | | |
| 2015 | Jurassic World | Simon Masrani | English | | |
| 2015 | Jazbaa | Inspector Yohan | Hindi | | |
| 2015 | Talvar | Ashwin Kumar | Hindi | | |
| 2015 | Bajirao Mastani | – | Hindi | Narrator | |
| 2016 | Madaari | Nirmal Kumar | Hindi | | |
| 2016 | Inferno | Harry "The Provost" Sims | English | | |
| 2017 | Hindi Medium | Raj Batra | Hindi | | |
| 2017 | Raabta | – | Hindi | Narrator | |
| 2017 | No Bed of Roses | Javed Hasan | Bengali; English | Indo-Bangladesh joint production film, also producer; Nominated— Filmfare Critics Award for Best Actor | |
| 2017 | The Song of Scorpions | Aadam | Hindi | | |
| 2017 | Qarib Qarib Singlle | Yogi | Hindi | | |
| 2018 | Puzzle | Robert | English | | |
| 2018 | Blackmail | Dev Kaushal | Hindi | | |
| 2018 | Karwaan | Shaukat | Hindi | | |
| 2020 | Angrezi Medium | Champak Bansal | Hindi | Filmfare Award for Best Actor | |
| 2021 | Murder at Teesri Manzil 302 | Shekhar Sharma | Hindi | Posthumous and delayed release Filmed in 2008–2009 | |

== Television ==
List of Irrfan Khan television credits
| Year(s) | Title | Role(s) | Language(s) | Notes | Ref(s) |
|---|---|---|---|---|---|
| 1987 | Shrikant | Abhaya's husband | Hindi | | |
| 1988 | Bharat Ek Khoj | ʽAbd al-Qadir Badayuni | Hindi | | |
| 1991 | Kahkashan | Makhdoom Mohiuddin | Hindi | | |
| 1991 | Jazeere | Alfred | Hindi | Television film | |
| 1992 | Lal Ghas Per Neele Ghodey | Vladimir Lenin | Hindi | Teleplay | |
| 1992 | Chanakya | Senapati Bhadrashaal | Hindi | | |
| 1993 | Kirdaar | Various characters | Hindi; Urdu | | |
| 1994 | Chandrakanta | Badrinath / Somnath | Hindi | | |
| 1994 | The Great Maratha | Najib ad-Dawlah / Ghulam Kadir | Hindi | | |
| 1995 | Banegi Apni Baat | Kumar | Hindi | | |
| 1996 | Just Mohabbat | Mr. Singh | Hindi | Cameo appearance | |
| 1997 | Jai Hanuman | Valmiki | Hindi | | |
| 1997 | Bombay Blue | Ramiz | Hindi | | |
| 1998 | Sparsh | Unknown | Hindi | | |
| 1999 | Geeta Rahasya | Kansa | Hindi | | |
| 1999 | Tarkash | | Hindi | | |
| 1999–2000 | Star Bestsellers | Unknown / Mahesh / Unknown / Ganesh | Hindi | Episode: "Bhoron Ne Khilaya Phool"; Episode: "Ek Shaam Ki Mulaquat"; Episode: "Fursat Mein"; Episode: "Govind Aur Ganesh" | |
| 2000 | X Zone | Unknown | Hindi | 1 episode | |
| 2000 | Darr | Serial killer | Hindi | | |
| 2003 | Ssshhhh...Koi Hai | Amar | Hindi | Episode "From Reel to Real" | |
| 2004 | Kyaa Kahein | Host | Hindi | | |
| 2006 | Mano Ya Na Mano | Host | Hindi | | |
| 2009–2010 | MTV Roadies | Himself | Hindi | Season 7 | |
| 2010 | In Treatment | Sunil Sanyal | English | | |
| 2016 | Tokyo Trial | Radhabinod Pal | English; Japanese | Miniseries | |

== Video games ==
| Year | Title | Role | Ref. |
|---|---|---|---|
| 2015 | Lego Dimensions | Simon Masrani | |
