= List of awards and nominations received by Irrfan Khan =

Irrfan Khan awards and nominations
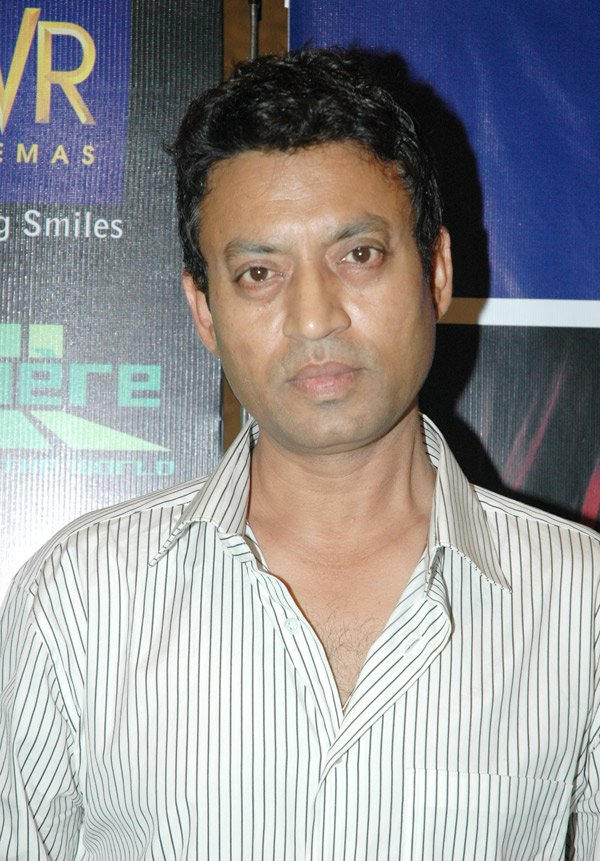
- Khan in 2008
Awards and nominations
Award	Wins	Nominations
Filmfare Awards	4	2
Zee Cine Awards	0	5
Screen Awards	4	4
Stardust Awards	1	2
Producers Guild Film Awards	2	7
IIFA Awards	3	5
National Film Awards	1	0
Big Star Entertainment Awards	0	2
Other awards	12	7
Honours	5	0

Totals (Note: Certain award groups do not simply award one winner. They acknowledge several different recipients, have runners-up, and have third place. Since this is a specific recognition and is different from losing an award, runner-up mentions are considered wins in this award tally. For simplification and to avoid errors, each award in this list has been presumed to have had a prior nomination.)
- Wins: 32
- Nominations: 34

Irrfan Khan (born Sahabzade Irfan Ali Khan; 7 January 1967 – 29 April 2020), also known simply as Irrfan, was an Indian film actor, known for his work predominantly in Hindi cinema, as well as his works in British films and Hollywood.

In a film career spanning almost thirty years and featuring in more than fifty domestic films, Khan has received numerous awards, including a National Film Award and Filmfare Awards in four categories. Film critics, contemporaries and other experts consider him to be one of the finest actors in Indian cinema for his versatile and natural acting. In 2011, he was awarded the Padma Shri, India's fourth highest civilian honour for his contribution to the field of arts.

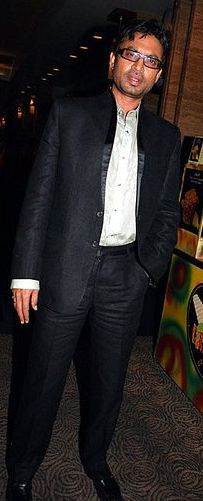
Khan in 2006

Domestically, he made his screen debut with the Academy Award nominated film Salaam Bombay! (1988). Followed by a series of roles in films that failed to propel his career forward, he received critical acclaim for playing negative roles in the drama films Haasil (2003) and Maqbool (2004), for the former he won the Filmfare Award for Best Villain and also received a nomination for Best Villain in The Killer (2006). The successful drama Life in a... Metro (2007) marked a turning point in Khan's career, earning him praise and several awards including the Filmfare Award for Best Supporting Actor. He rose to prominence with his portrayal of Paan Singh Tomar in the acclaimed biographical sports drama Paan Singh Tomar (2011), which garnered him the National Film Award for Best Actor and a Filmfare Critics Award for Best Actor. His performance in the BAFTA Award nominated romance The Lunchbox (2013) earned him universal acclaim by the critics and audiences. Khan went on to feature in the commercially and critically successful films Haider (2014), Gunday (2014), Piku (2015) and Talvar (2015). His highest-grossing Hindi release came with the critically acclaimed comedy-drama Hindi Medium (2017), which became a sleeper hit in India and China, which ranks among highest-grossing Indian films of all time and earned him praise for his performance, winning several awards. He received the Filmfare Award for Best Actor twice, for Hindi Medium (2017) and for its spiritual sequel Angrezi Medium (2020).

== Honours ==
- 2011 – Padma Shri – India's fourth highest civilian honour from the Government of India.
- 2017 – Honorary Award – Dubai International Film Festival
- 2021 – Filmfare Lifetime Achievement Award

== Awards and nominations ==
Year	Film	Award	Category	Result	Ref.
2004	Haasil	Filmfare Awards	Best Actor in a Negative Role	Won	
2004	Haasil	Zee Cine Awards	Best Performance in a Villainous Role	Nominated	
2004	Haasil	Screen Awards	Best Performance in a Negative Role	Won	
2004	Maqbool	Screen Awards	Best actor	Nominated	
2004	Maqbool	Zee Cine Awards	Best Performance in a Villainous Role	Nominated	
2007	The Namesake	Alliance of Women Film Journalists	Best Seduction	Won	
2007	The Namesake	Independent Spirit Award	Best Supporting Male	Nominated	
2007	The Namesake	Stardust Awards	Best Supporting Actor	Nominated	
2007	The Namesake	The Killer	Filmfare Awards	Filmfare Award for Best Villain	Nominated
Life in a... Metro	The Namesake	Producers Guild Film Awards	Best Actor in a Supporting Role	Nominated	
Life in a... Metro	2008	Filmfare Awards	Best Supporting Actor	Won	
Life in a... Metro	2008	International Indian Film Academy Awards	Best Supporting Actor	Won	
Life in a... Metro	2008	International Indian Film Academy Awards	Best Performance in a Comic Role	Nominated	
Life in a... Metro	2008	Screen Awards	Best Comedian	Won	
Life in a... Metro	2008	Screen Awards	Best Supporting Actor	Nominated	
Slumdog Millionaire	2008	Screen Actors Guild Award	Outstanding Performance by a Cast in a Motion Picture	Won	
Slumdog Millionaire	2009	Central Ohio Film Critics Association	Best Ensemble	Won	
Mumbai Meri Jaan	2009	International Indian Film Academy Awards	Best Actor In A Supporting Role	Nominated	
—N/a	2009	GQ (Indian edition)	Man of the Year	Won	
2010	New York	Producers Guild Film Awards	Best Actor In A Supporting Role	Nominated	
2010	New York	International Indian Film Academy Awards	Best Actor In A Supporting Role	Nominated	
2011	—N/a	International Indian Film Academy Awards	Outstanding Achievement in International Cinema	Won	
2012	—N/a	CNN-IBN Indian of the Year	Entertainment	Won	
2012	7 Khoon Maaf	International Indian Film Academy Awards	Best Performance in a Negative Role	Nominated	
2013	Paan Singh Tomar	National Film Awards	Best Actor	Won	
2013	Paan Singh Tomar	Filmfare Awards	Best Actor	Nominated	
2013	Paan Singh Tomar	Filmfare Awards	Best Actor (Critics)	Won	
2013	Paan Singh Tomar	Producers Guild Film Awards	Best Actor	Nominated	
2013	Paan Singh Tomar	Zee Cine Awards	Best Actor	Nominated	
2013	Paan Singh Tomar	Times of India Film Awards	Best Actor	Won	
2013	Paan Singh Tomar	Institute for Research and Documentation in Social Sciences	Best Male Character	Won	
2013	Paan Singh Tomar	Screen Awards	Best Actor	Won	
2013	The Lunchbox	Screen Awards	Best Actor	Nominated	
2013	The Lunchbox	Asian Film Awards	Best Actor	Won	
2013	The Lunchbox	Asia-Pacific Film Festival	Outstanding Achievement Award	Won	
2013	The Lunchbox	Asia-Pacific Film Festival	Best Actor	Nominated	
2013	The Lunchbox	Dubai International Film Festival	Best Actor	Won	
2014	The Lunchbox	Producers Guild Film Awards	Best Actor	Nominated	
2014	The Lunchbox	Producers Guild Film Awards	Star Verdict Performer of the Year	Won	
2014	The Lunchbox	Producers Guild Film Awards	Entertainer of the Year	Won	
2014	Qissa	Indian International Film Festival of Queensland	Best Actor	Won	
2014	D-Day	Zee Cine Awards	Best Actor	Nominated	
2015	Haider	Bollywood Hungama Surfers' Choice Movie Awards	Best Actor in a Supporting Role	Nominated	
2015	Haider	Producers Guild Film Awards	Best Actor in a Supporting Role	Nominated	
2015	Gunday	Producers Guild Film Awards	Best Actor in a Supporting Role	Nominated	
2016	Talvar	BIG Star Entertainment Awards	Most Entertaining Actor in a Thriller Role - Male	Nominated	
2016	Talvar	Star Screen Awards	Best Actor (Jury's Choice) – Male	Won	
2016	Talvar	Stardust Awards	Performer Of The Year (Male) - Editor's Choice	Won	
2016	Piku	Stardust Awards	Best Actor in a Supporting Role – Male	Nominated	
2016	Piku	Producers Guild Film Awards	Best Actor in a Leading Role	Nominated	
2016	Piku	Indian Film Festival of Melbourne	Best Actor	Won	
2016	Piku	BIG Star Entertainment Awards	Most Entertaining Actor in a Drama Role – Male	Nominated	
2016	Piku	International Indian Film Academy Awards	Best Supporting Actor	Nominated	
2016	Piku	Times of India Film Awards	Best Supporting Actor – Male	Nominated	
2016	Piku	Zee Cine Awards	Critics Award for Best Actor – Male	Nominated	
2018	Hindi Medium	Zee Cine Awards	Best Actor – Male (Jury's Choice)	Nominated	
2018	Hindi Medium	Screen Awards	Best Actor	Won	
2018	Hindi Medium	Filmfare Awards	Best Actor	Won	
2018	Hindi Medium	Filmfare Awards	Best Actor (Critics)	Nominated	
2018	Hindi Medium	News18 Reel Movie Awards	Best Actor	Won	
2018	Hindi Medium	International Indian Film Academy Awards	Best Actor	Won	
2018	Qarib Qarib Singlle	Screen Awards	Best Actor	Nominated	
2018	Doob: No Bed of Roses	Filmfare Awards East	Critics’ Award for Best Actor (Male)	Nominated	
2021	Angrezi Medium	Filmfare Awards	Best Actor	Won	
2022	Angrezi Medium	International Indian Film Academy Awards	Best Actor	Nominated	

== See also ==
- List of accolades received by Slumdog Millionaire
- List of accolades received by Piku
