= Academy Award for Best International Feature Film =

American film award

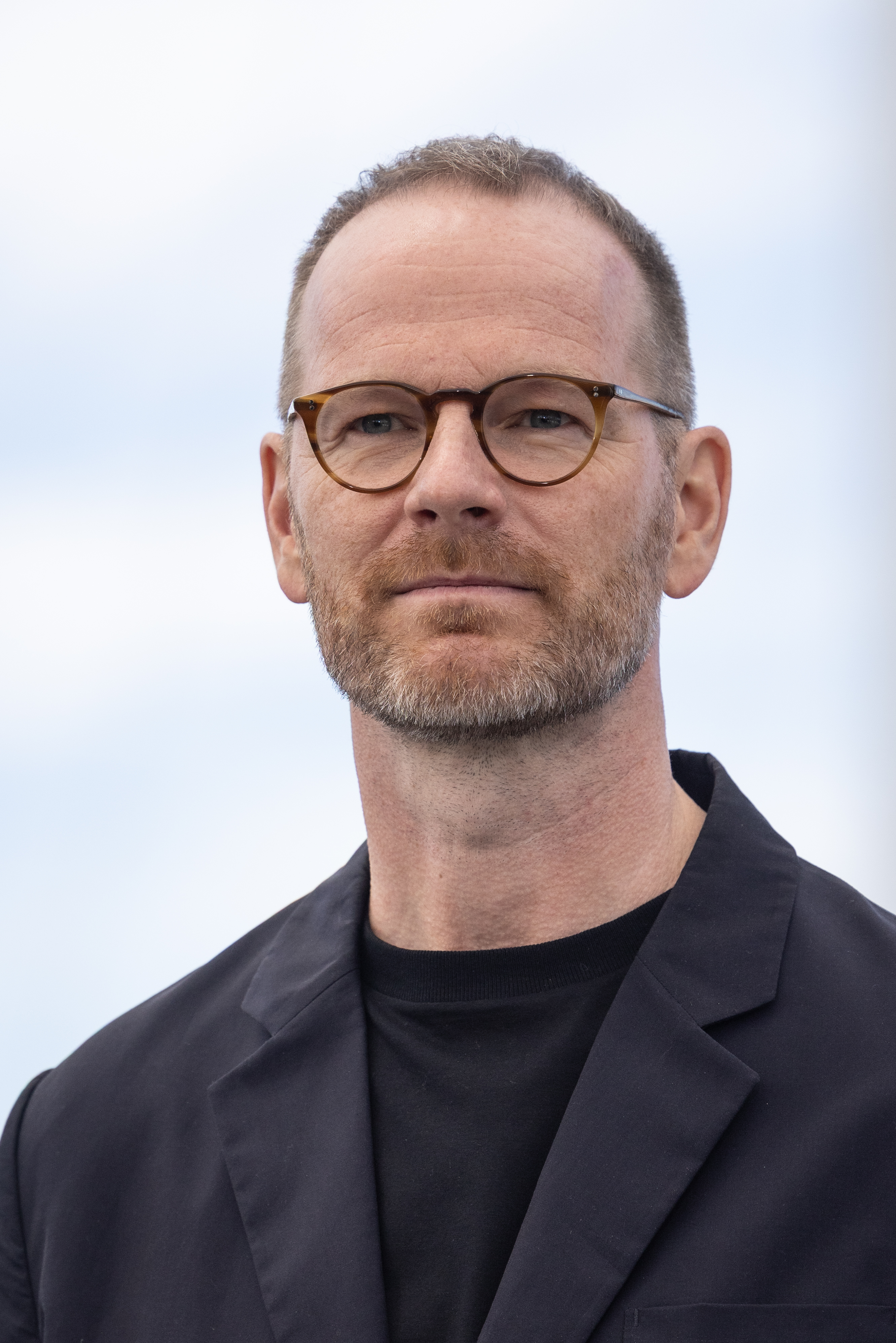
- The 2025 recipient: Joachim Trier (Norway)
- Awarded for: Excellence in International Film with a predominantly non-English dialogue track
- Country: United States
- Presented by: Academy of Motion Picture Arts and Sciences (AMPAS)
- Formerly called: Academy Award for Best Foreign Language Film (until 2020)
- First award: March 20, 1948; 78 years ago (for films released in 1947)
- Most recent winner: Sentimental Value (2025)
- Website: oscars.org

The Academy Award for Best International Feature Film (known as Best Foreign Language Film prior to 2020) is one of the Academy Awards handed out annually by the U.S.-based Academy of Motion Picture Arts and Sciences (AMPAS). It is given to a feature-length motion picture produced outside the United States with a predominantly non-English dialogue track.

When the first Academy Awards ceremony was held on May 16, 1929, to honor films released in 1927/28, there was no separate category for foreign language films because most of the films released in 1927 and in 1928 were silent films. Between 1947 and 1955, the academy presented Special/Honorary Awards to the best foreign language films released in the United States. These awards, however, were not handed out on a regular basis (no award was given in 1953), and were not competitive since there were no nominees but simply one winning film per year. For the 1956 (29th) Academy Awards, a competitive Academy Award of Merit, known as the Best Foreign Language Film Award, was created for non-English speaking films and has been given annually since then.

Although directors are the official recipients of the International Feature Film Oscar, it is not an individual accolade. The Academy historically considered it a collective award for both the submitting country and the director on behalf of the film creatives as a whole. Initially, not even the winning film director used to be officially acknowledged as the recipient of the award. This changed in 2014, when the Academy finally agreed to directly acknowledge filmmakers of winning International Feature Films, engraving their name on the Oscar statuette ever since. In 2026, it was announced that the eligibility criteria for Best International Feature Film would be modified beginning in 2027 to allow foreign language films that win a top jury award at one of six international film festivals to also be eligible for consideration.

Over the years, the Best International Feature Film Award and its predecessors have been given predominantly to European films: out of the seventy-seven awards handed out by the academy since 1947 to foreign language films, fifty nine have gone to European films, nine to Asian films, six to films from the Americas and three to African films. Italian filmmaker Federico Fellini directed four Best Foreign Language Film Academy Award–winning motion pictures during his lifetime, a record that remains unmatched as of 2024 (if Special Awards are taken into account, then Fellini's record is tied by his countryman Vittorio De Sica).

The most awarded foreign country is Italy, with 14 awards won (including three Special Awards) and 33 nominations, while France is the foreign country with the most nominations (41 for 12 wins, including three Special Awards). Israel is the foreign country with the most nominations (10) without winning an award, while Portugal has the most submissions (40) without a nomination. In 2020 (92nd), South Korea's entrant Parasite became the first International Feature Film winner, as well as the first non-English language film overall, to win Best Picture.

== History ==
When the first Academy Awards ceremony was held in 1929, no foreign-language film was honored. During the early post-war era (1947–1955), eight foreign language films received Special or Honorary Awards. Academy leader and board member Jean Hersholt argued that "an international award, if properly and carefully administered, would promote a closer relationship between American film craftsmen and those of other countries". The first foreign language film honored with such an award was the Italian neorealist drama Shoeshine, whose citation read: "the high quality of this motion picture, brought to eloquent life in a country scarred by war, is proof to the world that the creative spirit can triumph over adversity". In the following years, similar awards were given to seven other films: one from Italy (The Bicycle Thief), two from France (Monsieur Vincent and Forbidden Games), three from Japan (Rashomon, Gate of Hell and Samurai, The Legend of Musashi), as well as a Franco-Italian co-production (The Walls of Malapaga). These awards, however, were handed out on a discretionary rather than a regular basis (no award was given at the 26th Academy Awards held in 1954), and were not competitive since there were no nominees but simply one winning film per year.

A separate category for non-English-language films was created in 1956. Known as the Best Foreign Language Film Award, it has been awarded every year since then. The first recipient was the Italian neorealist drama La Strada, which helped establish Federico Fellini as one of the most important European directors.

During the academy's board of governors meeting on April 23, 2019, it was decided that the category would be renamed Best International Feature Film beginning at the 92nd Academy Awards in 2020. It was argued that the use of the term "Foreign" was "outdated within the global filmmaking community", and that the new name "better represents this category, and promotes a positive and inclusive view of filmmaking, and the art of film as a universal experience". Animated and documentary films would also be permitted in this category. The existing eligibility criteria remained.

== Eligibility ==
Unlike other Academy Awards, the International Feature Film Award does not require films to be released in the United States in order to be eligible for competition. Films competing in the category must have been first released in the country submitting them during the eligibility period defined by the rules of the academy and must have been exhibited for at least seven consecutive days in a commercial movie theater. The eligibility period for the category differs from that required for most other categories: the awards year defined for the International Feature Film category usually begins and ends before the ordinary awards year, which corresponds to an exact calendar year. For the 80th Academy Awards, for instance, the release deadline was set on September 30, 2007, whereas the qualifying run for most other categories was extended until December 31, 2007.

Although the award is commonly referred to simply as the Foreign Film Oscar in newspaper articles and on the Internet, such a designation is misleading, since a film's nationality matters much less than its language. Although a film has to be produced outside the United States in order to be nominated for the award, it also has to be in a language other than English. Foreign films with dubbed American actors can be nominated, for example, Battle of Neretva (1969) starring Orson Welles and Yul Brynner. Foreign films where most of the dialogue is in English cannot qualify for the International Feature Film Award, and the academy has usually applied this requirement very seriously by disqualifying films containing too much English dialogue, the most recent case being that of the Nigerian film Lionheart (2019). Despite the basic importance of the foreign language requirement, the 1983 Algerian dance film Le Bal and the 2024 Latvian animated film Flow were nominated despite completely lacking dialogue.

Another disqualifying factor is a film's television or Internet transmission before its theatrical release, hence the academy's rejection of the Dutch film Bluebird (2004). A film may also be refused if its submitting country has exercised insufficient artistic control over it. Several films have been declared ineligible by the academy for the latter reason, the most recent of which is Persian Lessons (2020), Belarus's entry for the 93rd Academy Awards. The disqualifications, however, generally take place in the pre-nomination stage, with the exception of A Place in the World (1992), Uruguay's entry for the 65th Academy Awards, which was disqualified because of insufficient Uruguayan artistic control after having secured a nomination. As of the 2021 ceremony, it is the only film to have been declared ineligible and removed from the final ballot after having been nominated in this category.

Since the 2006 (79th) Academy Awards, submitted films no longer have to be in the official language of the submitting country. This requirement had previously prevented countries from submitting films where most of the dialogue was spoken in a language that was non-native to the submitting country, and the academy's executive director explicitly cited as a reason for the rule change the case of the Italian film Private (2004), which was disqualified simply because its main spoken languages were Arabic and Hebrew, neither of which are indigenous languages of Italy. This rule change enabled a country like Canada to receive a nomination for a Hindi-language film, Water. Previously, Canada had been nominated for French-language films only, since films shot in Canada's other official language (English) were ineligible for consideration for the Foreign Language Film category. Before the rule change, Canada had submitted two films in different languages—the invented-language film A Bullet in the Head in 1991 and the Inuktitut language film Atanarjuat: The Fast Runner in 2001. Inuktitut, one of the country's aboriginal languages, is not official throughout Canada, but was (and still is) official in Nunavut and the Northwest Territories. Neither film earned a nomination. The rule change, however, did not affect the eligibility of non-English speaking American films, which are still disqualified from the category due to their nationality. Because of this, a Japanese-language film like Letters from Iwo Jima (2006) or a Mayan-language film like Apocalypto (2006) was unable to compete for the Academy Award for Best Foreign Language Film, even though they were both nominated for (and, in the case of Letters from Iwo Jima, won) the Golden Globe Award for Best Foreign Language Film, which does not have similar nationality restrictions. The nationality restrictions also differ from the practice of the British Academy of Film and Television Arts (BAFTA) for their analogous award for Best Film Not in the English Language. While BAFTA Award eligibility requires a commercial release in the United Kingdom, that body does not impose a nationality restriction.

All films produced inside the United States have been ineligible for consideration regardless of the language of their dialogue track. This fact also included films produced in U.S. overseas possessions. However, Puerto Rico is an unincorporated territory of the United States and used to be eligible despite Puerto Ricans having had American citizenship since 1917. Their best success in this award was receiving a nomination for What Happened to Santiago (1989). However, in 2011 the academy decided not to allow submissions from the territory anymore.

In May 2026, it was announced that beginning with the 99th Academy Awards in 2027, non-English language films that win top jury awards at the Berlin (Golden Bear), Busan (Best Film Award), Cannes (Palme d'Or), Sundance (World Cinema Grand Jury Prize), Toronto (Platform Prize) and Venice (Golden Lion) international film festivals would also become eligible for consideration.

== Submission and nomination process ==
Every country (excluding the United States) is invited to submit what it considers its best film to the academy. Only one film is accepted from each country. The designation of each country's official submission has to be done by an organization, jury or committee composed of people from the film industry. For example, the British entry is submitted by the British Academy of Film and Television Arts, and the Brazilian entry is submitted by a committee under its Ministry of Culture. Names of the members of the selecting group must be sent to the academy.

After each country has designated its official entry, English-subtitled copies of all submitted films are screened by the Foreign Language Film Award Committee(s), whose members select by secret ballot the five official nominations. This procedure was slightly modified for the 2006 (79th) Academy Awards: a nine-film shortlist was published one week before the official nominations announcement, and a smaller 30-member committee, which included 10 New York City-based Academy members, spent three days viewing the shortlisted films before choosing the five official nominees. The procedure was amended again for the 93rd Academy Awards (2020), allowing all Academy members to take part in this selection procedure. As of 2022, the two-committee system has been reinstated with an "International Feature Film Preliminary Committee" that shortlists fifteen films and an "International Feature Film Nominating Committee" that narrows down the final five nominees.

== Recipient ==
Unlike the Academy Award for Best Picture, which goes individually to the winning film's producers, the International Feature Film Award is considered a collective award for the submitting country and the film creatives as a whole. The film director is the official recipient, who has the name written on the statue plaque after the country name and movie title. For example, the Oscar statuette won by the Canadian film The Barbarian Invasions (2003) was until recently on display at the Museum of Civilization in Quebec City. It is now on display at the TIFF Bell lightbox.

The rules currently governing the International Feature Film category state that "The Academy statuette (Oscar) will be awarded to the film and accepted by the director on behalf of the film’s creative talents. For Academy Awards purposes, the country will be credited as the nominee. The director’s name will be listed on the statuette plaque after the country and film title". Therefore, the director is the only official recipient of the Award, accepting it during the ceremony on behalf of the film creatives. But this just has happened since the 2014 change to include the movie director as official recipient on the Oscar award. The award has always been associated collectively, except for the 1956 (29th) Academy Awards, when the names of the producers were included in the nomination for Best Foreign Language Film. Therefore, officially, it is considered that a director like Federico Fellini received collectively the four Academy Awards which his films won in the Best Foreign Language Film category, with the 1992 Honorary Award being the only Oscar that Fellini won individually.

By contrast, the BAFTA Award for Best Film Not in the English Language is awarded to the director and producer—that award's rules specifically state that the nomination and award is presented to the director or if "a producer equally shared the creative input with the director, both names may be submitted. A maximum of two individuals will be nominated per film".

In 2014, it was announced that the name of the director will be engraved onto the Oscar statuette in addition to the name of the country. Beginning at the 99th Academy Awards (2027), the film will be credited as the nominee/winner rather than country or region due to the changes in eligibility criteria. However, if the winner was originally nominated via a national selection, the country will still receive a statuette on its behalf, and the plaque will still credit the country as well.

== Criticisms and controversies ==
Because each country chooses its official submission according to its own rules, the decisions of the nominating bodies in each respective country are sometimes mired in controversy: for instance, the Indian selection committee (Film Federation of India) was accused of bias by Bhavna Talwar, the director of Dharm (2007), who claimed her film was rejected in favor of Eklavya: The Royal Guard (2007) because of the personal connections of the latter film's director and producer. Vox's Alissa Wilkinson argued in 2020 that countries such as China, Russia, and Iran frequently censor their submissions, ignoring films with politically controversial messages. Iranian films such as The Seed of the Sacred Fig (2024) and It Was Just an Accident (2025) were successfully selected via co-producing countries (Germany and France respectively) instead, after being snubbed by Iran for political reasons.

Another major controversy came in 1985 when Akira Kurosawa's highly acclaimed Ran was not submitted for nomination by Japan, reportedly because Kurosawa was personally unpopular in the Japanese film industry. Anatomy of a Fall (2023) was snubbed by France despite winning the Palme d'Or at Cannes, with Variety suspecting that it may have been in retaliation for director Justine Triet having made statements in support of the pension reform protests during her acceptance speech.

In recent years, the academy's definition of the term "country" has caused debate. The submissions for the 75th Academy Awards, for instance, became shrouded in controversy when it was reported that Humbert Balsan, producer of the critically acclaimed Palestinian film Divine Intervention (2002), tried to submit his picture to the Academy but was told it could not run for the Foreign Language Film Award because the State of Palestine is not recognized by the academy in its rules. Because the academy previously had accepted films from other political entities such as Hong Kong, the rejection of Divine Intervention triggered accusations of double standards from pro-Palestinian activists, according to Electronic Intifada. Three years later, however, another Palestinian-Arab film, Paradise Now (2005), succeeded in getting nominated for the Foreign Language Film Award. The nomination also caused protests, this time from pro-Israeli groups in the United States, which objected to the academy's use of the name Palestine on its official website to designate the film's submitting country. After intense lobbying from pro-Israeli groups, the academy decided to designate Paradise Now as a submission from the Palestinian Authority, a move that was decried by the film's director Hany Abu-Assad. During the awards ceremony, the film eventually was announced by presenter Will Smith as a submission from "the Palestinian territories."

Another object of controversy is the academy's "one-country-one-film" rule, which has been criticized by some filmmakers. Guy Lodge of The Guardian wrote in 2015 that the idea of a Best Foreign Language Film category is a "fundamentally flawed premise" and this is the "most critically sneered-at of all Oscar categories". It also stated "In a perfect world—or, at least, as perfect a world as would still allow for gaudy film-award pageantry—there'd be no need for a separate best foreign language film Oscar. The fact that, after 87 years, the Academy never honored a film not predominantly in English as the year's best says everything about their own limitations, and nothing about those of world cinema". The 2019 South Korean film Parasite was the first to win both the newly named Best International Feature Film and Best Picture in the same year.

== Winners ==
- 1947: Shoe-Shine
- 1948: Monsieur Vincent
- 1949: Bicycle Thieves
- 1950: The Walls of Malapaga
- 1951: Rashomon
- 1952: Forbidden Games
- 1953: N/A
- 1954: Gate of Hell
- 1955: Samurai, The Legend of Musashi
- 1956: La Strada
- 1957: Nights of Cabiria
- 1958: Mon Oncle
- 1959: Black Orpheus
- 1960: The Virgin Spring
- 1961: Through a Glass Darkly
- 1962: Sundays and Cybele
- 1963: 8½
- 1964: Yesterday, Today and Tomorrow
- 1965: The Shop on Main Street
- 1966: A Man and a Woman
- 1967: Closely Watched Trains
- 1968: War and Peace
- 1969: Z
- 1970: Investigation of a Citizen Above Suspicion
- 1971: The Garden of the Finzi Continis
- 1972: The Discreet Charm of the Bourgeoisie
- 1973: Day for Night
- 1974: Amarcord
- 1975: Dersu Uzala
- 1976: Black and White in Color
- 1977: Madame Rosa
- 1978: Get Out Your Handkerchiefs
- 1979: The Tin Drum
- 1980: Moscow Does Not Believe in Tears
- 1981: Mephisto
- 1982: To Begin Again
- 1983: Fanny and Alexander
- 1984: Dangerous Moves
- 1985: The Official Story
- 1986: The Assault
- 1987: Babette's Feast
- 1988: Pelle the Conqueror
- 1989: Cinema Paradiso
- 1990: Journey of Hope
- 1991: Mediterraneo
- 1992: Indochine
- 1993: Belle Époque
- 1994: Burnt by the Sun
- 1995: Antonia's Line
- 1996: Kolya
- 1997: Character
- 1998: Life Is Beautiful
- 1999: All About My Mother
- 2000: Crouching Tiger, Hidden Dragon
- 2001: No Man's Land
- 2002: Nowhere in Africa
- 2003: The Barbarian Invasions
- 2004: The Sea Inside
- 2005: Tsotsi
- 2006: The Lives of Others
- 2007: The Counterfeiters
- 2008: Departures
- 2009: The Secret in Their Eyes
- 2010: In a Better World
- 2011: A Separation
- 2012: Amour
- 2013: The Great Beauty
- 2014: Ida
- 2015: Son of Saul
- 2016: The Salesman
- 2017: A Fantastic Woman
- 2018: Roma
- 2019: Parasite
- 2020: Another Round
- 2021: Drive My Car
- 2022: All Quiet on the Western Front
- 2023: The Zone of Interest
- 2024: I'm Still Here
- 2025: Sentimental Value

== See also ==
- BAFTA Award for Best Film Not in the English Language – British film industry award
- Critics' Choice Movie Award for Best Foreign Language Film – Award given by the Critics Choice Association
- Golden Globe Award for Best Foreign Language Film
- List of Academy Award–nominated films
- List of Academy Award–winning foreign-language films (in categories other than the International Feature Film category itself)
- List of foreign-language films nominated for Academy Awards (in categories other than the International Feature Film category itself)
