= Hrishitaa Bhatt =

Indian actress and model (born 1981)

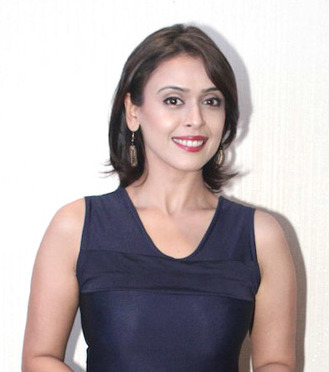
- Bhatt in 2018
- Born: 10 May 1981 (age 45); Mumbai, Maharashtra, India
- Education: Trinity College London
- Occupations: Actress, model
- Years active: 1999–present
- Spouse: Anand Tiwari (m. 2017)

Hrishitaa Bhatt (born 10 May 1981), also spelled as Hrishita Bhat, is an Indian actress and model. She debuted in the film Asoka (2001) opposite Shah Rukh Khan, but it was Haasil (2003) that brought her fame. Bhatt received critical acclaim for the role and appeared in films like Ab Tak Chhappan (2004) and Jigyaasa (2006), thereafter. Bhatt was part of the ensemble cast of the ZEE5 cop drama web series, Lalbazaar.

== Early life ==
Hrishitaa Bhatt was born on Sunday, May 10, 1981 in Mumbai, Maharashtra, India. She is an alumna of Trinity College London, and took Jazz lessons from choreographer Shiamak Davar. She was in the Liril advertisement campaign in 1999 and has also appeared in the music videos, Aankhon Me Tera Hi Chehra by Aryans with Shahid Kapoor and Dil- Kisi Pe Jab Aa Jaye by Sonali Vajpayee.

== Career ==
=== 2001–2002: Debut ===
Bhatt debuted with the epic historical drama film Asoka (2001) playing the role of Devi, the wife of Mauryan emperor, Ashoka, played by Shah Rukh Khan. She was nominated in the ‘Best Female Debut’ category at the Zee Cine Awards and the ‘Most Promising Female Newcomer’ at Screen Weekly Awards.

Her next movie was the multi-starrer Dil Vil Pyar Vyar (2002) where she plays the role of a young independent woman, Jojo, to Jimmy Shergill's Hrithik Mittal, who wants him to move out of his father's shadow and become independent. Commenting on the role, Rakesh Budhu of Planet Bollywood writes that her "role is small and she continues to show confidence as an actress excellently". The same year, Bhatt starred as a lead with Abhishek Bachchan in the comedy drama film, Shararat (2002). She plays the role of Neha Sengupta who advises community service as a punishment to the errant Rahul, played by Bachchan.

=== 2003–2009 ===
Bhatt was a part of around twenty-five films during this period across various languages - Hindi, Urdu, Bengali, Telugu, and Kannada. Some of her notable films are Haasil (2003), Ab Tak Chhappan (2004), and Charas: A Joint Operation (2004). Playing the role of Niharika in the critically acclaimed Haasil, her performance was praised by Kanchana Suggu of Rediff, saying "Bhatt as the coy yet strong, quiet yet confident girl is worth a special mention". Reviewing Ab Tak Chappan, trade analyst Taran Adarsh on Bollywood Hungama says Bhatt doesn't "get ample scope, but leaves a mark nonetheless".

In 2007, she debuted in the Bengali film industry with Jeet and Priyanshu Chatterjee in Bidhaatar Lekha. Her 2007 film, Dharm, by debutant director Bhavna Talwar, was an official entry to the 2007 Cannes Film Festival. In 2008, she appeared in IshQ Bector's music video Daaku Daddy with Shakti Kapoor. She had special appearances in the movies Kisna: The Warrior Poet (2005), Page 3 (2006), Heyy Baby (2007), and My Name is Anthony Gonsalves (2008).

=== 2010–2014 ===
She had a handful of releases during this period. Bhatt dabbled in regional films with the 2010 Marathi film, Mani Mangalsutra, and played the role of Sohini in the 2013 popular Bengali movie, Mrs. Sen. Her Hindi film releases were Idiots Box (2010), Ammaa Ki Boli (2012) as Pramila, and Anuradha (2014) as Ritu. She had a special appearance in the 2011 action-thriller film by Tigmanshu Dhulia, Shagird.

In 2011, she debuted as a producer with the comic drama film, Shakal Pe Mat Ja. In 2014, she performed a classical dance along with Vidya Malvade on the occasion of Ram Navami, organised by film producer and industrialist Madan Paliwal in Chittorgarh.

=== 2015–present ===
She played the pivotal role of a young village wife, Maya, in the 2015 movie, Miss Tanakpur Haazir Ho. By this time, she also started doing Bengali, Punjabi, and Marathi movies. She was the chief guest at the 2015 India Independence Day festivities at the Federation of Indian Associations-Chicago (FIA). The year saw four more movie releases: Ishq Vich: You Never Know (Punjabi), Dhol Taashe (Marathi), Namaste (Nepali), and Tarfid (Persian).

In 2016, she played the role of a young Bengali widow, Mishti, who is educated and modern, and grieving the loss of her Army husband in the Vivek Agnihotri directorial, Junooniyat, along with Yami Gautam and Pulkit Samrat. Bhatt had a special appearance in the movie, Shorgul, and was a lead in the Hindi action drama 30 Minutes, also starring Hiten Paintal, Hemant Pandey, and Rana Jung Bahadur. She was part of the Film Preview Committee for the International Film Festival of India (IFFI) 2017.

Her next few movies before debuting on the web series platform in 2020 were the psychological thriller, Ishq Tera (2018), Prakash Electronic (2017), and Happi (2019). She briefly hosted the Rangoli program on DD National between 2018 and 2019.

In 2020, she debuted in the digital space with the cop drama, Lalbazaar, web series on ZEE5 in the role of a journalist, followed by another ZEE5 series, Chargesheet: The Shuttlecock Murder.

With her popularity, returned to DD National to host the evergreen 'Rangoli' in 2022. She was Steering Committee Member of the International Film Festival of India (IFFI) for the years 2017, 2018, and 2022. Her involvement in promoting Indian cinema extends beyond national film festivals. In 2022, she was part of the esteemed Indian delegation that represented India and Indian cinema at the Venice Film Festival.

== Personal life ==
On 4 March 2017, she married Anand Tiwari, a senior diplomat with the United Nations, in a private ceremony in Delhi.

== Filmography ==
=== Selected filmography ===
| Year | Film | Role | Language | Notes |
|---|---|---|---|---|
| 2001 | Asoka | Devi | Hindi | |
| 2002 | Dil Vil Pyar Vyar | Jojo D'Souza | Hindi | |
| 2002 | Shararat | Neha Sengupta | Hindi | |
| 2003 | Out of Control | Richa | Hindi | |
| 2003 | Haasil | Niharika Singh | Hindi | |
| 2004 | Ab Tak Chhappan | Vaishali Shukla | Hindi | |
| 2004 | Charas: A Joint Operation | Naina | Hindi | |
| 2005 | Kisna: The Warrior Poet | Rukmani | Hindi | Special appearance |
| 2005 | Valmiki | Aishwarya | Kannada | |
| 2006 | Raam | Jyothika | Telugu | |
| 2006 | Ankahee | Sheena Saxena | Hindi | |
| 2006 | Jigyaasa | Jigyaasa Mathur | Hindi | |
| 2006 | Jawani Diwani: A Youthful Joyride | Radha U. Jumani | Hindi | |
| 2006 | Page 3 | | Hindi | Appearance in an item number |
| 2007 | Godfather | | Urdu | |
| 2007 | Dharm | Mani | Hindi | |
| 2007 | Bidhatar Lekha | | Bengali | |
| 2007 | Heyy Babyy | | Hindi | Special appearance |
| 2008 | Deshdrohi | Neha R. Raghav | Hindi | |
| 2008 | Dhara | | Hindi | |
| 2008 | Heroes | Saloni | Hindi | |
| 2008 | Don Muthu Swami | Sanjana M. Swami | Hindi | |
| 2008 | My Name is Anthony Gonsalves | | Hindi | Appearance in an item number |
| 2009 | Dhoondte Reh Jaaoge | Riya | Hindi | |
| 2009 | Marega Salaa | Priya | Hindi | |
| 2009 | Awasthi | Shumona | Hindi | |
| 2009 | Aasma: The Sky Is the Limit | Summi | Hindi | |
| 2009 | The Hero - Abhimanyu | | Hindi | |
| 2010 | Mani Mangalsutra | Savitri | Marathi | |
| 2011 | Shagird | | Hindi | Special Appearance |
| 2012 | Ammaa Ki Boli | Pramila | Hindi | |
| 2012 | Bekhabar | | Hindi | |
| 2013 | Mrs. Sen | Sohini | Bengali | |
| 2014 | Anuradha | Ritu | Hindi | |
| 2015 | Miss Tanakpur Haazir Ho | Maya | Hindi | |
| 2015 | Dhol Taashe | | Marathi | |
| 2016 | Shorgul | | Hindi | Special appearance |
| 2016 | Junooniyat | Mishti | Hindi | |
| 2017 | Prakash Electronic | Barkha | Hindi | |
| 2019 | Happi | Shumona | Hindi | Released on ZEE5 |
| 2020 | X Zone | | Hindi | |
| 2022 | Cuttputlli | Seema Singh | Hindi | Released on Disney+ Hotstar |
| 2022 | India Lockdown | | Hindi | Released on ZEE5 |

=== TV Show ===
- Swaraj as Rani Lakshmi Bai(2023)

=== Web series ===
| Year | Title | Language | Platform | Notes |
|---|---|---|---|---|
| 2019 | The Chargesheet: Innocent or Guilty? | Hindi | ZEE5 | |
| 2020 | Lalbazaar | Bengali | ZEE5 | |
