= Charas (2004 film) =

2004 Indian Hindi-language action thriller film

Charas: A Joint Effort
- Poster
- Directed by: Tigmanshu Dhulia
- Written by: Tigmanshu Dhulia
- Produced by: Anjum Rizvi
- Starring: Jimmy Sheirgill; Uday Chopra; Irrfan Khan
- Cinematography: Satyajit Pande (Setu)
- Music by: Raju Singh
- Distributed by: Yash Raj Films
- Release date: 7 May 2004
- Running time: 142 minutes
- Country: India
- Language: Hindi
- Box office: ₹ 5.1 million

Charas is a 2004 Indian Hindi-language crime thriller film directed by Tigmanshu Dhulia. Set in Kasol, a village near Manikaran in Kullu, Himachal Pradesh, the film explores the illegal drug trade. It stars Jimmy Sheirgill, Uday Chopra and Irrfan Khan with Kabir Sadanand, Namrata Shirodkar, and Hrishita Bhatt in supporting roles.

== Cast ==
- Jimmy Sheirgill as Dev Anand
- Uday Chopra as ACP Ashraf A. Khan
- Irrfan Khan as Policeman/DCP Randhir Singh Rathore
- Namrata Shirodkar as Piya Goswami
- Hrishita Bhatt as Naina Thakur
- Anup Soni as ACP Yashpal Chaturvedi
- Varun Badola as Amin Mohammed
- Kabir Sadanand ACP Siddharth Negi
- Sanjay Mishra as the blind man
- Deepak Dobriyal as Afghan militant
- Adam Bedi as Sam Higgins
- Rajiv Gupta

== Music ==
Charas: A Joint Effort

Soundtrack album by Raju Singh
- Released: 2004
- Genre: Feature film soundtrack
- Language: Hindi
- Label: Saregama

Raju Singh chronology
Fida (2004)	Charas: A Joint Effort (2004)	Page 3 (2005)

The soundtrack of Charas was composed by Raju Singh with the lyrics being written by Javed Akhtar and Tigmanshu Dhulia.

Track no.	Title	Singer(s)
1	"Bhambole"	Sunidhi Chauhan
2	"Charas"	Sowmya Raoh
3	"Hum Chale"	Sonu Nigam, Shaan
4	"Sulge Huye Hain"	Kumar Sanu, Alka Yagnik
5	"Tumhen Arpan"	Hariharan, K.S Chithra
6	"Ye Dhuaan"	Mahalaxmi Iyer

== Critical reception ==
The film received mixed reviews. Taran Adarsh from Bollywood Hungama rated 1 out of 5, terming it as "a half-baked product that disappoints". Vivek Fernandes from Rediff stated the film as "compelling watch. So catch it, even if it is just for kicks." Kaveree Bamzai from India Today criticised the film as a "completely flat entertainer".
