= Anil Sapkal =

Academic, creative writer, and film maker

- Born: December 13, 1966 (age 59); Satara, Maharashtra, India
- Other name: Kumar Anil
- Occupation: Academic
- Notable work: writer of award-winning Marathi film "Gabhara"
- Movement: Dalit Sahitya, Dalit Theater

Dr. Anil Sapkal (born December 13, 1966) is an academic, creative writer in Marathi and a film maker. In 2014 he became a Professor at Marathi Department, University of Mumbai. He wrote the screen play and dialogue for the recent Marathi feature film Dhol Taashe.

== Early life ==
Sapkal was born in Wai, Maharashtra, Satara. He was educated up to Higher Secondary Examination at Koregaon and then moved to Pune for higher studies. He completed his graduation and master's degrees at Fergusson College, Pune. He completed his Ph.D. at Savitribai Phule Pune University in 1996.

== Career ==
=== Academics ===
Sapkal did his M.A. in Marathi literature and was awarded a Ph.D Degree for research work on Marathi Chitrapatachi Patkatha : Ek Chikitsak Abhayaas (मराठी चित्रपटाची पटकथा: एक चिकित्सक अभ्यास) in 1996. He cleared National Eligibility Test in 1996 and State Eligibility Test in 1997. He is an expert on the subject of Dalit literature and theater, critical Cultural studies.

==== Awards ====
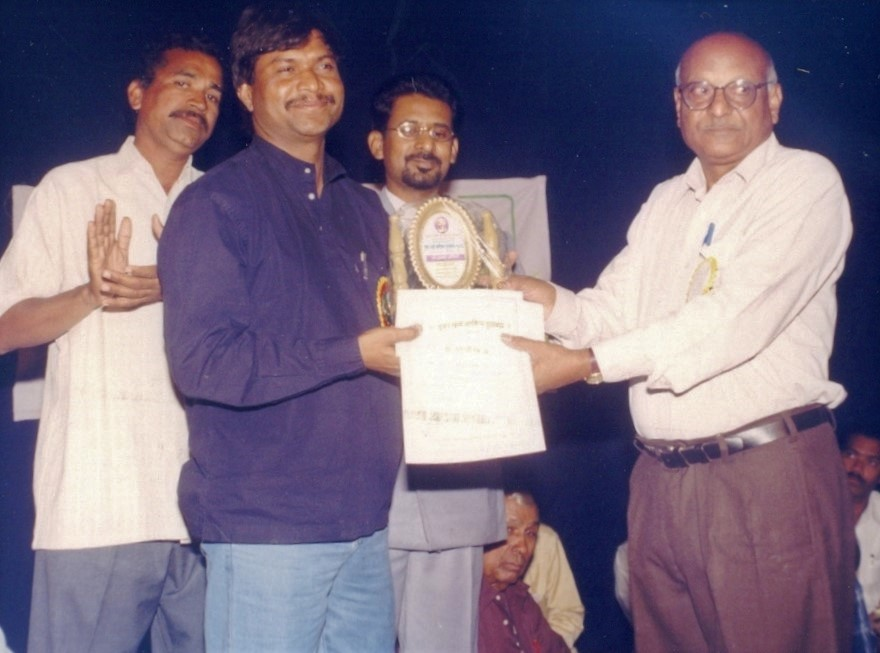
Receiving "Tuka Mhane Purskar" (तुका म्हणे पुरस्कार) in presence of Madhukar Wakode and Sadanand Deshmukh

1. "Anjanatai Ingle Feminist Literary Award" for the edited Marathi book Sandarbhasahit Streevad (संदर्भांसहित स्त्रीवाद).

2. "Screen play writer K. A. Abbas award" 2014 as screen play writer.

3. "Tuka Mhane" award for the novel ‘Bhadaas’. 2003.

4. For writing story, screenplay and dialogue for a Marathi feature film Gabhara, produced by NFDC in 1999. This film bagged the Maharashtra State Government Award of the Best Feature Film, 2000.

5. For editing Bhalri Diwali Issue, this issue bagged the prize for the Best Diwali Issue of Maharashtra Sahitya Parishad in 1993.

==== Published books ====
1. Sandarbhasahit Streevad: Streevadache Samakaleen Charchavishwaa (संदर्भासहित स्त्रीवाद) - Dr. Anil Sapkal is one of the editors of this book. The other editors are - Prof. Vadana Bhagavat and Gitali V. M. 2. Samiksha Dusari Khep (समीक्षा दुसरी खेप) (Criticism), 2013 Research Articles on various Literary Genres.

3. Samiksha Pahili Khep (समीक्षा पहिली खेप) (Criticism), Pratima Prakashan, 2008 Research Articles on various Literary Genres.

4. Marathi Chitrapatachi Patkatha (मराठी चित्रपटाची पटकथा) (Criticism), Pratima Prakashan, 2005. Descriptive Study of the screenplay of Marathi Cinema

5. Chatrapati Shahu Maharaj (छत्रपती शाहू महाराज) (Biography for Children)- Rayaat Shikshan Sanstha and Macmillan India 2003. Bhadas (Novel) Navin Udyog Prakashan. Dec. 2002. The novel criticizes the hierarchy of castes in rural India. It is a unique experiment of writing style, especially the use of colloquial language and visual images through words.

6. Natak: Aklan Ani Aswad (नाटक आकलन आणि आस्वाद) (Text book for Third year B. A.) for Yashwantrao Maharashtra Open University, Nashik.

7. Hava Ahe Tari Kashi (हवा आहे तरी कशी) (science story for children) 1990.

==== Published eBook ====
1.Peshwait Melela Pandhra Undir (पेशवाईत मेलेला पांढरा उंदीर)(collection of short stories)Ecobookhut 2019.

==== Research ====
1. Research Project for BCUD of University of Pune - Subject - Movies based on Marathi Novels.

2. Major Research Project for University Grants Commission Subject - Dalit Theatre: Elements of Art related to Text and Performance, 2008.

3. Awarded Ph.D Degree for Research work on Marathi Chitrapatachi Patkatha : Ek Chikitsak Abhayaas in 1996

=== Creative writing ===
1. Bhadas (भडास) (Novel) Sayan Publication. Dec. 2014. The novel criticizes the hierarchy of castes in rural India. It is a unique experiment of writing style, especially the use of colloquial language and visual images through words.

2. Peshwait Melela Pandhra Undir (पेशवाईत मेलेला पांढरा उंदीर) (collection of short stories), Sugawa Prakashan 2004. Stories describing the cultural conflict of Dalits and upper castes in postmodern era. The stories are significant for its unique narrative style.

3. Parambya (पारंब्या) (Poetry) 1989. Symbolic poetry in Marathi that uses the imagery of the banyan tree roots to express pain, revolt, denial and compassion.

=== Media ===
==== Feature film ====
1. Story/ Screenplay /Dialogues and Associate Director for the Marathi Feature Film ‘Gabhara’, produced by N.F.D.C. in 1999.
2. Associate Writer and Associate Director for the Marathi feature film ‘He Git Jivanache’ directed by Ram Gabale in 1995.
3. Associate Director for Sugandha, a Marathi feature film directed by Shrinivas Bhanage in 1996.
4. Associate Director for Dharala Tar Chavataya, a Marathi feature film directed by Shrinivas Bhanage
5. Screenplay /Dialogues writer of Marathi feature film Dhol Taashe (2014)
6. Screenplay /Dialogues writer of Marathi feature Dhangarwada (2014)

==== Audio Media ====
- Have written and participated in various programmes for All India Radio.
- Participated in ‘Amar Vichar’, a series broadcast by Radio Cylon.
- Worked as a co-ordinator for Yuvawani Programmes of All India Radio, Pune.

==== Audio Visual Media – Director and Scriptwriter ====
- Direction and Script - Paulkhuna, a documentary on Women's Development in Pune city, 2006.
- Direction and Script - Mrigajal, a Marathi serial for DD10, 2000.
- Direction and Script - Shantabai, a Marathi documentary on life and work of well known social worker Shantabai Dani, 1999.
- Direction and Script - Pravah, a Marathi documentary on tribal culture, for DD1, 1998.

==== Audio Visual Media – Joint Director and Scriptwriter ====
- Hindola, a documentary film on deserted women, 2008.

==== Audio Visual Media - Technical Director ====
- Many Bodies One Soul, an industrial documentary, 1993.
- Success Built on Value, an industrial documentary, 1993.

==== Audio visual media - Script writing and Associate director ====
1. Deshbhakta Keshavrao Jedhe (documentary based on Keshavrao Jedh, a patriot), for DD, 1999.

2. Vanarai Bunds, (documentary based on watershed development), 1996.

3. Bhumiputra Yashavantrao Chavan, (documentary based on Yashwantrao Chavan), for DD, 1993.

4. Yashavantrao, (documentary based on Yashwantrao Chavan)1993.

5. Brahmapuriche Vaibhav, (documentary based on Brahmapury museum), Part I & II, 1990.

6. Ashish, ( a Hindi serial based on crippled child), for DD, 1989.

7. Gautyanna Arati, (Marathi serial based on 1942) for DD, 1992.

8. Chingi has future, (documentary based on disabled children) for National Network, 1991.

==== Audio Visual Media - Associate Director ====
1. Towards sustainable development, (documentary), 1997.

2. Pach shiledar (documentary based on Jayaram Shiledar's Family), 1993.

3. Godhan ale ghara ( documentary based on animal husbandary), 1993.

=== Involvement in various socio-cultural activities ===
He is one of the inventors of Samyak Sahitya Sanmenla (सम्यक साहित्य संमेलन).

He is one of the founders of Samyak Shortfilm Festival.
