= Dhol Taashe =

- Directed by: Ankur Kakatkar
- Written by: Ankur Kakatkar
- Screenplay by: Dr. Anil Sapkal
- Story by: Ankur Kakatkar
- Produced by: Rajkumar Sadashiv Anjute,
- Starring: Jitendra Joshi; Abhijeet Khandkekar; Hrishita Bhatt
- Cinematography: Kedar Gaekwad
- Music by: Nilesh Moharir
- Production company: Bramhandnayak Movies
- Release date: 3 July 2015 (Theatrical)
- Country: India
- Language: Marathi

Dhol Taashe is a 2015 drama, action Marathi language film that was directed by Ankur Kakatkar. The film is got its theatrical release on 3 July 2015. It stars Abhijeet Khandkekar and Hrishitaa Bhatt with Jitendra Joshi playing a negative role. Dhol Taashe was Ankur Kakatkar's first political drama film.

== Plot ==
Dhol Taashe depicts the culture of people who play the musical instruments dhol (a drum instrument) and taashe in cultural processions in Maharashtra. The main character is Amey Karkhanis (Abhijeet Khandkekar), a young man who loses his job in the IT sector due to economic recession. After losing his job, Amey involves himself with a group of "Dhol Taashe" artistes who play dhol for cultural reasons and not money. Amey tries to corporatise this cultural tradition and bring it into mainstream.

In this process, Amey files a Public Interest Litigation in court to safeguard the interests of several groups playing "Dhol Taashe". As he files a litigation, he also wins the case where a political party leader Aditya Deshmukh (Jitendra Joshi) is also safeguarded and is saved from a police arrest.

Aditya absorbs Amey into his party and they start working together. In the process of working together a conflict arises and the film depicts the extent of violence that continues.

== Cast ==
- Abhijeet Khandkekar as Amey Karkhanis
- Jitendra Joshi as Aditya Deshmukh
- Hrishita Bhatt
- Pradeep Welankar
- Ila Bhate
- Vidyadhar Joshi
- Dipen Parande as Human Resources Representative

== Critical reception ==
The film received mixed reviews from critics. The Times of India rated movie with two stars saying, "The story of a youngster's dreams, aspirations and the measures he has to take to turn them into reality."
