= Happi (film) =

2010 film directed by Bhavna Talwar

- Promotional Poster
- Directed by: Bhavna Talwar
- Written by: Mohinder Singh, Rishabh Sharma
- Produced by: Gary Dillon; Sachindra Nath
- Starring: Pankaj Kapoor; Supriya Pathak; Hrishitaa Bhatt
- Cinematography: Martin Grosup
- Edited by: Asif Ali Shaikh; Sreekar Prasad
- Music by: Songs: Ilaiyaraaja; Debojyoti Mishra; Background Score: Ilaiyaraaja
- Release date: 25 December 2019
- Running time: 135 minutes
- Country: India
- Language: Hindi

Happi is a Hindi-language film directed by Bhavna Talwar and produced by Vistaar Film Fund & WSG Pictures. The film, made in black-and-white, stars Pankaj Kapoor, and is an homage to Charlie Chaplin as per the director. Pankaj Kapoor plays the part of a Chaplin-esque character. After being stuck in development hell, the film was released on ZEE5 on 25 December 2019.

== Plot ==
Happi is a comedy drama that tells the amazing story of survival of a social misfit set in Mumbai. The film is all about a man, who is content with what he earns as his needs are few and thus, he is comfortable being a misfit. He earns by making people laugh as well as by singing at Cafe Bombay.

His life turns upside down and he is shattered as the same place is now getting revamped into 'Club Mumbai' – a hip, high class upmarket lounge. But he refuses to be beaten down by the circumstances and fights back with his self belief with an unlikely companion, a puppy.

== Cast ==
- Pankaj Kapoor as Happi
- Supriya Pathak as Rukmani
- Hrishitaa Bhatt as Shumona
- Nakul Vaid as Adil
- Manoj Pahwa
- Raj Saluja as Wilson
- Farroukh Mehta
- Sachin Gaikwad
- Sahil Vaid as Albert
- Tejaswini Kolhapure as Gayatri (special appearance)

== Production ==
The film, originally made in colour, was converted to black-and-white inspired by 2011 Academy Award for Best Picture winner The Artist as it suits the mood and theme of the film.

== Soundtrack ==
Ilaiyaraaja provided the film score for this film and the lyrics were written by Jaideep Sahni and actor Kamalhassan has sung a song in this movie.

Happi (Original Motion Picture Soundtrack)
No.	Title	Lyrics	Music	Singer(s)	Length
1.	"Zindagi Dish"	Jaideep Sahni	Ilaiyaraaja	Kamal Haasan	1:29
2.	"Phata Yeh Sole Hai"	Jaideep Sahni	Ilaiyaraaja	Shaan	3:50
3.	"Mera Toh Chand Hai"	Mohinder Pratap Singh	Ilaiyaraaja	Sunidhi Chauhan	3:38
4.	"Roz Roz"	Mohinder Pratap Singh	Ilaiyaraaja	Anchal Datta Bhatia	2:24
5.	"Barishon"	Rishhabh Sharrma	Debojyoti Mishra	Anchal Datta Bhatia	4:48
6.	"Raat Yeh Ghul Gayi"	Rishhabh Sharrma	Ilaiyaraaja	Sunidhi Chauhan	4:16
Total length:					20:23
