= Raghavendra Rathore =

Indian fashion designer (born 1967)

- Born: Jodhpur, Rajasthan, India
- Education: Parsons School of Design, New York
- Occupation: Fashion designer
- Labels: Raghavendra Rathore; Imperial India Company; Gurukul School of Design; Jodhpur Design Company; Ajit Bhawan Hotel; Hotel Narlai; RR Blue
- Spouse: Kavita Singh

Raghavendra Rathore is an Indian luxury lifestyle designer, creative director, chief design officer and a hotelier. He is also the founder of the bespoke brand Raghavendra Rathore Jodhpur that has made a mark on the fashion scene for being solely responsible for putting the Jodhpuri Bandhgala and Jodhpuri Breeches on the global stage. He has his name in luxury bespoke menswear, Mr. Rathore was one of the Indian Designers to coin his namesake label as a ‘Made in India’ brand, translating traditional Indian ensembles for the global clientele such as the Emir of Qatar, Duchess of York, actors like Mr. Amitabh Bachchan, Mr. Saif Ali Khan and sportspersons like Mr. Virat Kohli. His costume designs for Hollywood movies like "The Gray Man" and Bollywood films like Oh my God, Eklavya & Khoobsurat.

Raghavendra Rathore has been awarded in 2012 by Government of Rajasthan for his contribution in the field of fashion design.

== Personal life ==
Born on 7 October 1967, and raised in Jodhpur, Mr. Rathore is a descendent of Rao Jodha, the founder of the city. Coming from a royal lineage stretching back over 800 years, his childhood was steeped in rich customs and culture. His mother is related to the Maharaja of Kashmir’s family, and has had an immense role to play in nurturing his creativity, sense of aesthetics and value for culture and heritage in his early years. Mr. Rathore is also the cousin of Maharaja Gaj Singh of Jodhpur, and the grandson of Maharaja Sawai Man Singh’s sister.

== Education and career ==
He studied and worked in the US for about a decade. He then studied arts and philosophy at the Marlboro College in Vermont, and went on to graduate from the Parsons School of Design in New York City, in 1992. After graduating from Parsons, Rathore went to work for Donna Karan as an assistant designer for DKNY. Rathore also worked in Paris with de la Renta as an assistant, when de la Renta was hired to design for the house of Pierre Balmain. Taking inspiration from Royal family's legacy, he molded it into the foundation for his future brand. With the inspiration of his illustrious family and his grand-aunt, Maharani Gayatri Devi (born as Princess Gayatri Devi of Cooch Behar; 23 May 1919 − 29 July 2009), he was drawn to the world of fashion at an early age, that has led to a flourishing career in the industry.

== Brands ==
Launching his first brand in 1994, Rathore started with his tailored womenswear label and a decade later chose to launch Raghavendra Rathore Jodhpur, a menswear brand which is known globally for its bespoke tailored clothing. Considered a lifestyle merchant, he is known for resurrecting the ‘Brand India’ strategy, by elevating heritage men’s clothing to wardrobe staples. Tracing its roots from - but not restricted to - a regal ethnic ethos, the brand is credited with giving new life to the relic Bandhgala jacket (a high collared jacket or suit with front button closure, also called a Nehru Jacket).

Starting from beginnings in Jodhpur, the brand has grown to have international recognition. Working selectively with Bollywood movies, celebrities and projects related to design from all walks of life such as interiors and uniform design, the brand designed 30 looks for Amitabh Bachchan for TV show Kaun Banega Crorepati. In his course of work, he has also interacted with people like Jacqueline Onassis, Elinor Lampard, and Maharani Gayatri Devi on account of the work that he used to do for Oscar de la Renta. Mr. Rathore also launched his ready-to-wear label, RR Blue, a line of contemporary and festive aesthetics’ targeted at the millennial individual.
