= Koshish – Ek Aashaa =

Indian soap opera

- Also known as: Koshish - Ek Aashaa
- Written by: R M Joshi; Vipul Mehta; Bhavin Patel; Mahesh Pandey; Dialogue: Sunjoy Shekhar
- Directed by: Anurag Basu; Hemant Prabhu
- Starring: Sandhya Mridul, Varun Badola
- Opening theme: "Woh Aashaa Hai" by Priya Bhattacharya
- Composer: Lalit Sen
- Country of origin: India
- No. of episodes: 117

Production
- Producers: Ekta Kapoor; Shobha Kapoor
- Cinematography: Sanjay Memane
- Editors: Dharmesh Shah, Vinay Malu; Sandeep Dharne
- Running time: 22 minutes
- Production company: Balaji Telefilms

Original release
- Network: Zee TV
- Release: 7 March 2000 – 3 June 2002

Koshish – Ek Aashaa is an Indian soap opera that aired on Zee TV from 7 March 2000 till 3 June 2002. It won the award for 'Best Soap Opera' at the RAPA Awards in 2001.

== Overview ==
Kajal is a young woman who gets married on the insistence of her mother. She has not met the man prior to the wedding. However, on the wedding night, Kajal discovers that the man is actually a mentally challenged person who has the mind of an eight year old. She realises that she has been tricked into marrying him by her in-laws. This makes her furious. Kajal wants to tell her mother, but cannot because her mother is a heart patient. Kajal is unwilling to accept this marriage and blames her in-laws for ruining her life. Neeraj is innocent and childlike. Kajal finds it hard to tolerate his behaviour, because of which their relationship has quite a turbulent start. After spending some time together, however, Kajal and Neeraj become close. Kajal's mother finds out about the situation and forces Kajal to come back home. Neeraj panics since he cannot stay without Kajal, who also does not want to leave him. Kajal's mother files a case against Neeraj's family. But, Kajal refuses to leave Neeraj. This strengthens their bond. Kajal comes back and starts her mission to cure Neeraj. She consults a specialist doctor who assists her in treating Neeraj. Gradually, Kajal becomes suspicious that someone in the family doesn't want Neeraj to get cured, but she isn't sure who the person is since everyone seems to love Neeraj a lot. Neeraj's doctor advises Kajal to take Neeraj to a medical camp which could help cure him. Kajal and Neeraj go, although Neeraj's father opposes the idea. When they come back, everyone is surprised at how much Neeraj has improved. All is going well, until on Neeraj's birthday, someone attacks him and he gets hurt on his head. This causes him to regress back into his earlier condition. Kajal is shattered, yet, she refuses to give up hope. She takes Neeraj to the United States for treatment. When they return, Neeraj is fully recovered. He is able to attend office, make his own decisions and understand everything. Kajal and Neeraj are able to live their marital life properly, and express their love to each other. Kajal becomes pregnant, because of which everyone is overjoyed. However, some misunderstandings occur between Kajal and Neeraj, which leads to them having an argument. Kajal has an accident and loses her child. She also loses her memory partially. Soon, it is revealed that Kajal was only pretending to have lost her memory to protect herself from the person who was responsible for Neeraj's condition. That person is Neeraj's mother, who is actually his stepmother. She was the person who killed Neeraj's grandfather, and made him mentally unstable. The reason behind all of this was that Neeraj is the heir to all of his grandfather's property, which his stepmother wanted for herself and her real children. Neeraj's stepmother dies as a result of poisoning, and so does his father. A few years later, Kajal and Neeraj are shown talking to each other about their lives. Neeraj thanks Kajal for supporting him and never giving up on him. They also have a daughter, who they named Asha. The show concludes on a happy note that everything is fine now, all because of Kajal's efforts (koshish).

== Cast ==
- Sandhya Mridul as Kajal
- Varun Badola as Neeraj
- Jaya Bhattacharya as Suniti
- Anupam Bhattacharya as Sudhir
- Savita Prabhune as Rekha
- Prachi Shah as Bhavana
- Shubhangi Gokhale as Kajal's mother
- Yamini Singh as Kamala, Kajal's Bua
- Rajesh Tandon as Ishaan
- Uday Tikekar as Neeraj's father
- Sheetal Thakkar as Kajal's sister
- Aditi Ghorpade as Neeraj's sister
- Shweta Kawatra
- Sai Ballal
- Mirza Zohaib Alam
- Suchita Trivedi
