= Shararat (2002 film) =

2002 film

- Directed by: Guroudev Bhalla
- Story by: Tanveer Khan; Urmi Juvekar
- Produced by: Dhillin Mehta
- Starring: Abhishek Bachchan; Hrishitaa Bhatt; Amrish Puri
- Cinematography: A. K. Bir
- Edited by: Aarti Bajaj
- Music by: Songs: Sajid–Wajid; Score: Babloo Chakravorty
- Distributed by: Shree Ashtavinayak Cine Vision Ltd
- Release date: 12 July 2002
- Running time: 122 minutes
- Country: India
- Language: Hindi

Shararat (transl. Mischief) is a 2002 Hindi-language comedy drama film directed by debutant Gurudev Bhalla, starring Abhishek Bachchan, Hrishitaa Bhatt and Amrish Puri. The film was released on 12 July 2002.

== Plot ==
Rahul Khanna (Abhishek Bachchan) is the only son of wealthy industrialists, who have no time for their son. On the other hand, Rahul has nothing but time on his hands and is hell-bent on getting into trouble with the law, such as racing cars with his friends. He gets away with it most of the time by bribing the officer until eventually, his luck runs out one day while stuck in traffic, and in a hurry to reach the airport for his flight to America, he meddles with the traffic lights, turning them all green and causing several vehicles to crash. This time the offence is too serious and unable to bribe the officer, he is arrested. DCP Bhosle (Om Puri) wants to teach Rahul a lesson but can't think of a way other than making him do time in jail. Neha Sengupta (Hrishitaa Bhatt), inspired by a Bill Clinton newspaper article, comes up with a unique punishment idea for Rahul: community service. The judge likes this idea and sentences a remorseless Rahul to a senior citizen's home out in the country. Sparks fly when Rahul meets the old residents of the senior citizens' home, as they do not get along very well.

== Cast ==
- Abhishek Bachchan as Rahul Khanna
- Hrishitaa Bhatt as Neha Sengupta
- Amrish Puri as Prajapati
- Mohnish Bahl as Vikram Saxena
- Helen as Anuradha Mathur
- Om Puri as DCP Bhosle
- Ashish Vidyarthi as Arora
- A. K. Hangal as Gajanan Desai
- Tinnu Anand as Saifuddin "Saifu"
- Daisy Irani as Mrs. Chitra Gujral
- Dara Singh as Mr. Gujral
- Viju Khote as Keshav Deshpande
- Navni Parihar as Advocate Nandini Khanna, Rahul's mother
- Romesh Sharma as Niranjan Khanna, Rahul's father
- Shubha Khote as Shanta Deshpande
- Anjan Srivastav as Judge K. R. P. Murthy
- Anang Desai as Neha's father
- Raj Zutshi as Gajanan's son
- Iravati Harshe as Gajanan's daughter-in-law
- Yatin Karyekar as Vijay Mathur
- Javed Khan as Traffic Police Constable Pandey
- Lilliput as Thief jailed in Police Station Lock Up

== Soundtrack ==
Shararat

Soundtrack album by Sajid–Wajid
- Released: July 12, 2002
- Genre: Feature film soundtrack
- Label: Tips Music

The soundtrack was composed by Sajid–Wajid. It consists of 8 original songs. The lyrics were written by Sameer.

- "Dil Kehta Hai" – Sonu Nigam
- "Ek Ladki Mujhe" – Sonu Nigam & Alka Yagnik
- "Kuch Tum Kaho" – Sonu Nigam
- "Mehki Hawaon Mein" – Sonu Nigam & Kay Kay
- "Ye Main Kahan" – Hariharan, Anupama Deshpande, & Sonu Nigam
- "Mastana Albela" – Hariharan
- "Na Kisi Ki Aankh Ka" – Talat Aziz
- "Dil Kehta Hai" – Instrumental
