= Varun Badola =

Indian television actor

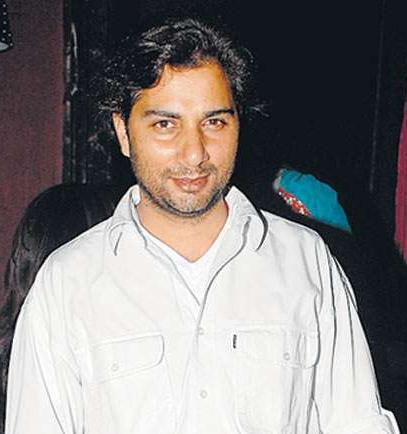
- Born: 7 January 1974 (age 52); New Delhi, India
- Occupations: Actor; dialogue writer
- Years active: 1994–present
- Spouse: Rajeshwari Sachdev (m. 2004)
- Children: 1
- Family: Alka Kaushal (sister)

Varun Badola (born 7 January 1974) is an Indian actor, known largely for his roles in Hindi television.

== Early life and education ==
Varun Badola was born on 7 January 1974. His father is a known artist, Vishwa Mohan Badola. He has two elder sisters – Alka, who is married and has appeared in the TV serial Kumkum and Qubool Hai, and Kalindi, who is a radio jockey. His family hails from Garhwal, Uttarakhand.

Badola spent the early part of his childhood in Allahabad after which he lived in New Delhi. He did his schooling from Sardar Patel Vidyalaya in New Delhi. After completing college, he started working to fulfill his ambition to become an actor.

== Career ==
Badola started his creative career as a costume coordinator followed by eight years experience of writing and directing. He assisted Tigmanshu Dhulia in Haasil and Charas, apart from acting in the two films. He had decided to take a break from directing to do some acting when he was offered the television serial Astitva.. Ek Prem Kahani.

Some of his successful soaps are include Banegi Apni Baat, Koshish - Ek Asha, Aroona Irani's Des Mein Nikla Hoga Chand, and Astitva... Ek Prem Kahani. He shot to fame when he played the role of a mentally disabled person on the television show Koshish produced by Balaji Telefilms, which proved to be a super-hit on Zee TV. Badola has directed and written the script for the show Aek Chabhi Hai Padoss Mein.

He is a singer and dancer as well, having shown his talents on reality television shows including the celebrity dance show named Nach Baliye 2 with his wife Rajeshwari where he was one of the semi-finalists. He is known to be an extremely hard-working actor and has been called television's Aamir Khan for his dedication and Dev Anand for his intense on-screen romance. Since August 2025, he played Suhas Divakar in SAB TV's Itti Si Khushi, after a six year television hiatus.

Badola and his wife Rajeshwari worked together on a play for the first time in a production called Shabd Leela which was based on Dr. Dharamveer Bharati's powerful love letters to his wife. He participated in the Celebrity Cricket League as a member of the team Mumbai Heroes, as an all-rounder.

== Personal life ==
Varun married actress Rajeshwari Sachdev on 24 November 2004. They met on the sets of the television show Antakshari and were engaged the same year. They had a son on 10 May 2010.

== Television ==
=== Fiction shows ===
Year	Show	Role	Notes
1994	Banegi Apni Baat	Ayushman	
2000	Rajdhani	Sunny	
2000–02	Koshish – Ek Aashaa	Neeraj Khanna	
2001	Love Mein Kabhi Kabhi		
2001	Yeh Hai Mumbai Meri Jaan	Balkrishna (Balu)	Nominated—Indian Telly Award for Best Actor in a Comic Role (2002)
2001–2003; 2005	Des Mein Niklla Hoga Chand	Dev Malik	Nominated—Indian Telly Award for Best Actor in a Lead Role (2002)
2004	Des Mein Niklla Hoga Chand	Rohit Sharma (after plastic surgery) / Bhola	
2002	Kutumb		
2002–06	Astitva...Ek Prem Kahani	Abhimanyu (Abhi) Saxena / Writer Anand	Nominated—Indian Telly Award for Best Actor in a Lead Role (2003—05)
2003	Awaz – Dil Se Dil Tak	Aman	
2005–06	Rabba Ishq Na Hove	Kushan	
2005–09	Ghar Ek Sapnaa	Gautam	
2006–07	Sohni Mahiwal	Suresh	Nominated—Indian Telly Award for Best Actor in a Comic Role (2006) (2007)
2006–08	Aek Chabhi Hai Padoss Mein	Sandeep Shukla	Nominated—Indian Telly Award for Best Actor in a Lead Role (2007)
2007	Jersey No. 10	Abhay Singh Rana	
2008	Bhabhi	Himself	Special Appearance
2008	Ajeeb	Aditya Thapar	
2009	Ladies Special	Vinay Joshi	
2009	Khaufnaak	Anand	
2009–10	Sonu Sweety	Sonu	
2010	Mann Kee Awaaz Pratigya	Love Guru	
2010	Maan Rahe Tera Pitaah	Kaliprasad Kalka	
2010	Gili Gili Gappa	Vishnu Narayan	
2012–13	Phir Subah Hogi	Thakur Vikram Singh	Nominated—Indian Telly Award for Best Actor in a Negative Role (2013); Nominated—Indian Telly Jury Award for Best Actor in a Negative Role (2013)
2013	Savdhaan India – India Fights Back	Inspector Varun	Episode 384
2014	Tumhari Paakhi	Veer Pratap Singh	
2014	Yeh Rishta Kya Kehlata Hai	Ruhan Rajput	
2015	Lete Hai Khabar Khabron Ki	News Reporter	
2015	Tedi Medi Family	Vivek's friend	
2015–17	Mere Angne Mein	Raghav Shrivastav	
2018–19	Internet Wala Love	Shubhankar Verma	
2019	Mere Dad Ki Dulhan	Ambar Sharma	
2025–2026	Itti Si Khushi	Suhas Diwekar	

=== Web series ===
Year	Show	Role	Language	Notes
2018	Apaharan	Laxman Saxena	Hindi	
2019	Fixerr	Digvijay Dalmia	Hindi	
2020	Your Honor	Kaashi Samthar	Hindi	
2023	Guns & Gulaabs	Pratap	Hindi	
2023	Kohrra	Maninder 'Manna' Dhillon	Punjabi	
2024	Undekhi	Rajveer Malhotra	Hindi	
2024	Jamnapaar	K D Bansal	Hindi	

=== Reality shows ===
Year	Show	Role	Notes
2002	Chalti Ka Naam Antakshari	Guest	Episode 83 (Winner)
2005	Nach Baliye 1	Contestant	
2006	Nach Baliye 2	Host	1 episode
2006	Jodi Kamal Ki	Contestant	1 episode
2007	Comedy Circus	Contestant	
2007	Jjhoom India	Contestant	
2007	Kuch Kar Dikhana Hai	Judge	Episode 7
2008	Kaho Na Yaar Hai	Contestant	
2008	Yeh Hai Jalwa	Participant	
2008	Ustaadon Ka Ustaad	Participant	
2009	Laughter Ke Phatke	Guest	Episodes 26, 33, 34
2009	Comedy Ka King Kaun	Guest	Episode 52
2013	BIG Fame Star	Mentor	
2016	Box Cricket League	Captain of Pune Anmol Ratn Team	

== Filmography ==
Year	Title	Role	Notes
2003	Haasil	Javed	
2004	Charas	Amin Mohammed	
2005	Main, Meri Patni Aur Woh	Saleem	
2009	Sunset Shift	Taxi Driver	short
2013	Mickey Virus	Inspector Devender Bhalla	
2014	Jai Ho	Mr. D'souza	
2014	Lekar Hum Deewana Dil	Chacha	
2015	Solid Patels	Hetal's father	
2016	7 Hours To Go	Ramesh Dhadke	
2016	Azhar	Kapil Dev	
2019	Fraud Saiyaan	Badri	
2021	Rashmi Rocket	Dilip Chopra	
2023	Mission Raniganj	Shaligram	
2024	Mrs.	Tunnu Bhaiya	
2025	Sky Force	Air Vice Marshal Amit Narang	
2025	Saiyaara	Ashok Kapoor	
2025	War 2	Defence Minister Vilasrao Sarang	
2026	Satluj	Lawyer Jais	
