= Dil Vil Pyar Vyar =

- Directed by: Anant Mahadevan
- Screenplay by: Sujit Sen
- Dialogues by: Sanjeev Puri
- Story by: Vivek Vaswani
- Produced by: Vivek Vaswani; Metalight Productions
- Starring: R. Madhavan; Jimmy Sheirgill; Sanjay Suri; Rakesh Bapat; Namrata Shirodkar; Sonali Kulkarni; Hrishitaa Bhatt
- Cinematography: K. Rajkumar
- Edited by: Sanjib Datta
- Music by: Babloo Chakravorthy
- Production companies: Metalight Productions; Insight Films
- Release date: 18 October 2002
- Country: India
- Language: Hindi
- Budget: ₹4.50 crore
- Box office: ₹4.65 crore

Dil Vil Pyar Vyar (transl. Hearts and Romance) is a 2002 Indian Hindi-language romantic musical film directed by Anant Mahadevan and produced by Vivek Vaswani. The film stars R. Madhavan, Jimmy Sheirgill, Sanjay Suri, Hrishitaa Bhatt, Namrata Shirodkar, and Sonali Kulkarni.

== Plot ==
The first love story is about love getting a second chance. Devdarshan Suri alias Dev is a widower, his wife Payal dies soon after their honeymoon. He moves to Mumbai from Pune with his sister Rachna. Here he meets Gauri, who lives with her psychosomatically ill brother Gaurav.

Though they fall in love, the shadow of Gaurav's illness is always between them. And then Rachna falls in love with Gaurav: The second love story.

The third story is one of how love can be swallowed by ego, pride and insecurity. Krish Kumar and Raksha are happily married. Both are aspiring singers and want to become stars. Though Krish is more ambitious than Raksha, it is Raksha who succeeds first and becomes a rage. Their marriage totters.

The fourth love story is that of Hrithik Mittal and Jojo. Even though Hrithik is a multi-millionaire and both the families want them married, Jojo refuses to marry him until he gets a job and becomes independent of his father.

== Cast ==
- R. Madhavan as Krish Kumar
- Jimmy Sheirgill as Hrithik Mittal
- Sanjay Suri as Devdarshan “Dev” Suri
- Namrata Shirodkar as Raksha Krish Kumar
- Hrishitaa Bhatt as Jojo D'Souza
- Sonali Kulkarni as Gauri Shahapukar
- Raqesh Bapat as Gaurav Shahapukar, Gauri's brother
- Bhavna Pani as Rachna Suri, Dev's sister
- Asrani as Chandru
- Tiku Talsania
- Rita Bhaduri
- Kamini Khanna
- Mahabanoo Kotwal
- Kiran Kumar as Gautam Mittal, Hrithik's Father
- Gulshan Grover as Dharam
- Swapnil Joshi as Anil
- Riya Sen as Riya Thapar, Gaurav's girlfriend (Cameo appearance)
- Dipannita Sharma as Payal Suri, Dev's deceased wife (guest appearance)
- Mini Mathur (guest appearance)
- Tom Alter (special appearance)
- Gufi Paintal (special appearance)
- Joy Fernandes (special appearance)
- Murali Sharma (special appearance)
- Yashodhan Bal (special appearance)

== Reception ==
The film opened to positive reviews, with a critic from Rediff.com adding "it is the manner in which the filmmaker has infused these ordinary stories with passion and poignancy that sets Dil Vil Pyar Vyar apart from every other Hindi movie. Similarly, Planet Bollywood's critics noted that "the idea of Dil Vil Pyar Vyar has been implemented in a workable (and more importantly, watchable) manner and shows that talent and creativity still exists in our oft-inspired industry". Despite earning good reviews, the film did not perform well at the box office.

== Soundtrack ==
Thie film contains several re-arranged hit songs of R.D. Burman sung by singers like Kavita Krishnamurthy, Hariharan, Kumar Sanu, Abhijeet Bhattacharya, Alka Yagnik, Sadhna Sargam, Sunidhi Chauhan, Babul Supriyo, and Shaan. The re-arrangement was done by Babloo Chakravorty.

All music is composed by Babloo Chakravarty.

Songs
No.	Title	Singer(s)	Length
1.	"Ab Ke Saawan Mein"	Babul Supriyo, Sadhna Sargam	5:14
2.	"Barsaat Bhi Aakar"	Abhijeet Bhattacharya	3:32
3.	"Gum Hai Kisi Ke Pyar Mein"	Kavita Krishnamurthy, Hariharan	5:49
4.	"O Hansini"	Hariharan	4:35
5.	"O Hansini" (Instrumental)	–	4:36
6.	"O Haseena Zulfonwali"	Abhijeet Bhattacharya, Sunidhi Chauhan	5:09
7.	"O Haseena Zulfonwali" (Instrumental)	–	5:11
8.	"Kehna Hai"	Babul Supriyo, Preetha Mazumdar	4:39
9.	"Kehna Hai" (Solo)	Babul Supriyo	4:39
10.	"Kya Janoo Sajan"	Kavita Krishnamurthy	5:24
11.	"Mere Samnewali Khidki Mein"	Shaan	4:40
12.	"Raat Kali Ek Khwab"	Kumar Sanu	4:17
13.	"Tere Bina Zindagi Se"	Hariharan, Alka Yagnik	5:33
14.	"Tum Bin Jaaon Kahan"	Hariharan	4:01
15.	"Yaadon Ki Baaraat"	Kumar Sanu	4:21
16.	"Yeh Jo Mohabbat Hai"	Hariharan, Babul Supriyo, Abhijeet Bhattacharya	5:16
