= Jawani Diwani: A Youthful Joyride =

2006 Indian film by Manish Sharma

Jawani Diwani
- Directed by: Manish Sharma
- Written by: Ajjay Gosswami; Pradeep Tiwari
- Produced by: N. R. Pachisia
- Starring: Emraan Hashmi; Celina Jaitly; Hrishitaa Bhatt
- Cinematography: Rajeev Shrivastav
- Edited by: Steven H. Bernard
- Music by: Sajid–Wajid
- Distributed by: T-Series
- Release date: 6 January 2006
- Running time: 111 minutes
- Country: India
- Language: Hindi

Jawani Diwani (transl. Youthful craziness) is a 2006 Indian Hindi-language adult comedy film directed by Manish Sharma. The film stars Emraan Hashmi, Celina Jaitly, Hrishitaa Bhatt, Tiku Talsania, and Mahesh Manjrekar.

== Plot ==
Mannjit "Mann" Kapoor, is an aspiring singer living a middle-class lifestyle in India. He is unsuccessful in finding any recording labels to back his aspirations. He wants to secure a contract with Umesh Jumani, who is the managing director of a recording company, and in order to do this he sets his sights on wooing Umesh's attractive daughter, Radha. He succeeds in getting her to fall in love with him, and proposes marriage to her, thereby securing a contract with Umesh's company to record an album. He is all set to marry Radha, and he finally sees his dream of being a successful singer within his grasp.

With his impending marriage in sight, his friends arrange for a bachelor party in the province of Goa, a scenic beach area in India. While partying with all of them he happens to meet, and fall head over heels in love with a girl named Roma Fernandes who coincidentally, also an aspiring singer and dancer. Roma reciprocates his feelings, but is heartbroken upon learning that he is engaged and soon will be marrying Radha. Torn between his love for Roma and the commitment he made with Radha, a lovelorn Mann returns home from Goa, not knowing that his life is about to be turned upside down once Radha and Umesh find out about his dalliance with Roma. In the midst of all this upheaval, things are complicated further when he has a confrontation with an underworld don, Chappu Bhai, who wants Mann to honour his feelings toward Roma, and intends to make sure that he marries her and not Radha, no matter the consequence.

== Cast ==
- Emraan Hashmi as Mannjit "Mann" Kapoor
- Celina Jaitly as Roma Fernendes
- Tiku Talsania as Umesh Jumani
- Hrishitaa Bhatt as Radha U. Jumani
- Mahesh Manjrekar as Chappu Bhai
- Sherlyn Chopra as Mona
- Mushtaq Khan as Iqbal Hussain
- Shehzad Khan as Mannu Malik
- D. Santosh as Pandu

== Music ==
Jawani Diwani: A Youthful Joyride

Soundtrack album by Sajid–Wajid Clinton Cerejo Siddhartth-Suhas
- Released: 25 November 2005 (Digital Release); 6 January 2006 (Film)
- Genre: Feature film soundtrack
- Length: 30:43
- Label: T-Series

Professional ratings
Review scores
Source	Rating
Bollywood Hungama	2/5 stars

The soundtrack of the film is composed by Sajid–Wajid while the lyrics are penned by Shabbir Ahmed.

Song	Singer(s)
Dil Deewana	Sonu Nigam, Sowmya Raoh
Dilruba	Sunidhi Chauhan
Jawani Deewani	Bobby Moon
Jiska Mujhe Intezaar	K.K.
Sini Ne Sini Ne	Suhas
Yaad Teri Yaad	Abhijeet Sawant, Shreya Ghoshal
Sini Ne Remix	Suhas
Tere Ishq Mein Jag Chhuta	Rahul Saxena, Arif Sheikh, Shadaab Faridi

== Critical reception ==
Taran Adarsh of IndiaFM gave the film 1 star out of 5, writing ″Emraan tries hard to infuse life in JAWANI DIWANI, but in vain. The actor is capable of much more, but even a sincere performance from him cannot uplift things. Celina shows improvement in dramatic sequences, but needs to work on emotional ones. Hrishitaa doesn't get much scope. Mahesh Manjrekar just doesn't work. He hams throughout. Tiku Talsania is loud. Shehzad Khan does a takeoff on Anu Malik well. On the whole, JAWANI DIWANI cuts a sorry picture. At the box-office, a poor show all the way!″ Vipin Vijayan of Rediff.com ″If you can fathom the double-meaning dialogues a la Kyaa Kool Hai Hum and Masti, then you might sit through the first half. For those who like skin show, you may even manage to sit through the second half. But for those who want to watch a good movie, sorry boss, this is a complete waste of time, money and patience.″
