= Dharm (film) =

- Film poster
- Directed by: Bhavna Talwar
- Written by: Varun Gautam; Vibha Singh
- Starring: Pankaj Kapoor; Hrishitaa Bhatt; Supriya Pathak; Pankaj Tripathi; Daya Shankar Pandey; K.K.Raina
- Edited by: Steven Bernard
- Release date: 8 June 2007
- Running time: 105 minutes
- Country: India
- Language: Hindi

Dharm ('Religion') is a 2007 Indian Hindi-language film directed by Bhavna Talwar, starring Pankaj Kapoor and Supriya Pathak in lead roles. This is the debut film of the director, it addresses the theme of communal harmony. Most of it is shot in Varanasi.

At the 2007 National Film Award, it won the Nargis Dutt Award for Best Feature Film on National Integration. The film was premiered in the Tous Les Cinemas du Monde (World Cinema) section of 2007 Cannes Film Festival.

== Plot ==
The story is based in Benares and is about Pandit Chaturvedi (Pankaj Kapoor), a highly revered and learned Brahmin priest. He lives with his wife Parvati (Supriya Pathak) and young daughter Vedhika while serving as head priest at a temple financially managed by Vishnu Singh (K. K. Raina). He is accompanied by an American journalist during a visit to Vishnu Singh's home, where the journalist meets Vishnu Singh's daughter Mani (Hrishitaa Bhatt) and two eventually fall in love, much to the dislike of Vishnu Singh's son Surya Prakash (Pankaj Tripathi), who along with his goons gives the journalist a good beating. Mani however elopes and marries the journalist which causes rage in Surya towards Pandit Chaturvedi. Meanwhile Vedhika brings home an infant boy whose mother vanished after handing him over to her. Pandit Chaturvedi is not willing to keep the baby and contacts police but they have no idea about the baby's mother. On Parvati's request to adopt the baby and confirmation from Vedhika that boy belongs to Brahmin family as per his mother, Pandit Chaturvedi agrees to adopt the child. Initially he keeps his distance but with time develops fatherly feelings and eventually a strong bond with the kid and names him Kartika.

Kartika is now five years old and accompanies his foster father everywhere. One day the family is visited by another local priest Daya Shankar(Daya Shankar Pandey) who brings home Katika's birth mother. The family is shocked to see two women in veils entering their home one of whom, Nafeefa, is a social worker while other is Suriya, birth mother of Kartika, who being Muslim was given birth name of Mustafa. Since he had not been circumcised when he was lost, Pandit's family mistook him as Hindu. While Vedhika and Parvati are devastated at giving back Kartika to his mother, Pandit is torn by betrayal of his wife who had mentioned that the boy was a Brahmin. In order to purify himself, he starts Maun Vrat (vow of silence) and distances himself from performing rituals despite insistence of Vishnu Singh to rejoin the temple. But Pandit Chaturvedi still feels the love for Kartika in his heart and considers himself impure.

One night Vedhika hears her father say something. Joyous Parvati rushes to her husband to only hear him starting a Chandrayana Vrata (a month long fast). A pregnant Mani returns as a widow to her family; despite her brother's refusal to accept her, Vishnu Singh allots her a room as per instructions from Pandit Chaturvedi.

As city witnesses with religious fights, the family is visited by Suriya along with Kartika/Mustafa to request them to take him back to keep him safe. Parvati closes all the doors of house to keep them from entering in house. Later that night she talks with her husband about that.

One night Pandit Chaturvedi walks home and finds the city in ashes and blood. He walks around calling for Mustafa who calls him back from a window. At the same time a Muslim man runs to him who is chased by a group led by Surya and Daya. The group wants to lynch the man but they hesitate to proceed as the man hides behind Pandit Chaturvedi. Mustafa calls him, and upon seeing the kid, Surya declares that he will eliminate the kid due to which Pandit Chaturvedi has changed. Pandit Chaturvedi stops Surya and tells him that he has been teaching him and the city their religion and this is now their religion.

Pandit Chaturvedi calls Mustafa by the name he had given him 'kartika' and the boy runs to him. He picks the boy up and walks across the goons calmly. Everyone returns except Surya who stands there alone. In the last scene Pandit Chaturvedi and Kartika are walking home.

The movie ends with a message of communal harmony: "Dharm is not just penance and practice, Dharm is unity, Dharm is brotherhood, Dharm is non-violent."

== Critical reception ==
Dharma premiered at the 60th Cannes Film Festival and became the closing film of the World Cinema Section at the festival; it was also the official Indian entry to the Festival. It was screened at 38th International Film Festival of India (2007), in Goa, and later went to film festivals like the Cancun Film Festival, Mexico; Asian Festival of First Films, Singapore; and the Palms Spring Festival, California. The film was awarded the Swarovski Trophy for Best Film at the Asian Festival of First Films.

At home, though it wasn't a box office success, it opened to excellent reviews from the critics and later the world rights of the film were acquired by Films Distribution, France.

Dharm was embroiled in a controversy in India, where it became one of the finalists for India's official entry to the Oscars, a race it lost to Eklavya: The Royal Guard.

== Cast ==
- Pankaj Kapoor as Pandit Chaturvedi
- Supriya Pathak as Parvati
- Hrishitaa Bhatt as Mani
- Pankaj Tripathi as Surya Prakash
- K. K. Raina as Surya Prakash's father
- Daya Shankar Pandey as Pandit at the Ganga River Banks
