= Kyaa Kahein =

- Intertitle
- Genre: Supernatural drama
- Created by: Ekta Kapoor
- Developed by: Balaji Telefilms
- Written by: Anil Pandey
- Directed by: Mahim Joshie, Jatin Ravasia
- Opening theme: "Kyaa Kahein"
- Country of origin: India
- Original language: Hindi
- No. of seasons: 1

Production
- Producers: Ekta Kapoor; Shobha Kapoor
- Cinematography: Manoj Mundayat
- Editors: Vishal Sharma; Dharmesh Shah
- Running time: 45 minutes

Original release
- Network: Zoom
- Release: 17 September 2004 – 2005

Kyaa Kahein (translation: What Do We Say?) is a Hindi language supernatural drama series aired on Zoom channel. The series premiered on 17 September 2004. The series was hosted by actor Irrfan Khan.
