= Irrfan Khan =

Indian actor (1967–2020)

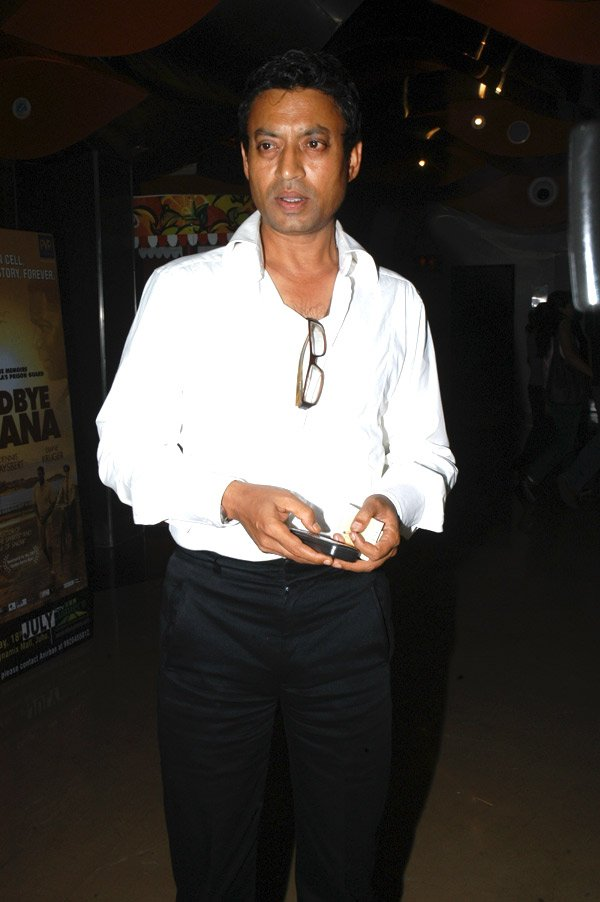
- Irrfan Khan at the screening of the film Goodbye Bafana at PVR
- Pronunciation: [ɪɾfɑːn xɑːn]
- Born: Sahabzade Irfan Ali Khan; 7 January 1967; Tonk, Rajasthan, India
- Died: 29 April 2020 (aged 53); Mumbai, India
- Occupation: Actor
- Years active: 1985–2020
- Works: Full list
- Spouse: Sutapa Sikdar (m. 1995)
- Children: 2, including Babil
- Awards: Full list
- Honours: Padma Shri (2011)

Irrfan Khan (Hindustani pronunciation: [ɪɾfɑːn xɑːn]; born Sahabzade Irfan Ali Khan; 7 January 1967 – 29 April 2020) was an Indian actor who worked in Indian cinema as well as British and American films. Widely regarded as one of the greatest actors in world cinema, Khan's career spanned over 30 years and earned him numerous accolades, including a National Film Award, an Asian Film Award, and six Filmfare Awards. In 2011, he was awarded the Padma Shri, India's fourth highest civilian honour. In 2021, he was posthumously awarded the Filmfare Lifetime Achievement Award.

Khan made his film debut with a small role in Salaam Bombay! (1988), which was followed by years of struggle. He acted in a few Film and Television Institute of India student films such as Reconnaissance (1990), directed by Sandeep Chattopadhyay. Among his first Hindi movies were Drishti (1990), a film by Govind Nihalani starring Dimple Kapadia and Shekhar Kapoor, in which he had a small but prominent role, and Ek Doctor Ki Maut (also in 1990), in which he portrayed a journalist and shared a major role opposite lead players Pankaj Kapur and Shabana Azmi. After this, he acted in the British film The Warrior (2001). He had his breakthrough as a leading actor in the Hindi movies Haasil (2003) and Maqbool (2004). He went on to gain critical acclaim for his roles in The Namesake (2006) for which he was nominated for the Independent Spirit Award for Best Supporting Male, Life in a... Metro (2007), and Paan Singh Tomar (2011). For portraying the title character in the last of these, he won the National Film Award for Best Actor. Further success came for his starring roles in The Lunchbox (2013), Piku (2015), and Talvar (2015) and he had supporting roles in the Hollywood films The Amazing Spider-Man (2012), Life of Pi (2012), Jurassic World (2015), and Inferno (2016). His other notable roles were in Slumdog Millionaire (2008), New York (2009), Haider (2014), and Gunday (2014), and the television series In Treatment (2010). His highest-grossing Hindi film release came with the comedy-drama Hindi Medium (2017), and his final film appearance was in its sequel Angrezi Medium (2020), both of which won him the Filmfare Award for Best Actor in 2018 and 2021.

As of 2017, his films had grossed $3.643 billion (₹237 billion) at the worldwide box office. Khan was diagnosed with neuroendocrine cancer in March 2018, and died from the disease on 29 April 2020. Khan was described by Peter Bradshaw of The Guardian as "a distinguished and charismatic star in Hindi and English-language movies whose hardworking career was an enormously valuable bridge between South Asian and Hollywood cinema". He was honoured in the 'In memoriam' segment of the 93rd Academy Awards.

== Early life and education ==
Khan was born on 7 January 1967 into a Pashtun family in Tonk, Rajasthan. Khan's mother, Saeeda Begum Khan was from Tonk, and his father, Yaseen Ali Khan, was from the Khajuriya village in Rajasthan's Tonk district, and they ran a tyre business. He spent his childhood in Tonk, and then Jaipur. Irrfan was good at cricket and was selected to play in the CK Nayudu Trophy for emerging players in the under-23 category, a tournament seen as a stepping stone to first-class cricket in India. However, he did not attend as he could not afford travel expenses.

He showed interest in acting under the influence of his maternal uncle who himself was a theatre artist in Jodhpur. In Jaipur, Khan was introduced to noted theatre artists and did several stage performances in the city. Khan completed his MA in Jaipur before joining the National School of Drama (NSD) in New Delhi in 1984 to study acting.

In his early days in Mumbai, he took up a job as an air conditioner repairman and visited the home of his acting inspiration, Rajesh Khanna, in 1984. Later in an interview Irfan stated, "The kind of craze witnessed by Rajesh Khanna has not been duplicated by anyone. He was the biggest and the most real star Bollywood has produced. I'd say stardom is that feeling of being possessed by your idol; you are so overwhelmed with euphoria you lose touch with reality."

== Career ==
=== Early career (1987–1990) ===
Soon after his graduation from NSD in 1987, Khan made his debut with Mira Nair's Salaam Bombay! where he was offered a minor role. However, his scenes were reduced in the final cut. He played Lenin in a teleplay on Doordarshan titled Laal Ghaas Par Neele Ghode, based on a translation by Uday Prakash of a Russian play by Mikhail Shatrov. He was then cast as a psycho killer, the main antagonist of the show, in the serial Darr. He also played the famous revolutionary, Urdu poet and Marxist political activist of India, Makhdoom Mohiuddin, in Kahkashan, produced by Ali Sardar Jafri. He acted in some of the episodes of Star Bestsellers (aired on Star-Plus). He also appeared in two episodes of the SET India serial Bhanvar. He acted in numerous television serials throughout the 1990s, including Chanakya, Bharat Ek Khoj, Sara Jahan Hamara, Banegi Apni Baat, Chandrakanta, Shrikant, AnooGoonj on Doordarshan, Star Bestsellers (Star Plus), Sparsh and The Great Maratha on DD National. He also played a double role in the popular 90s supernatural fantasy period drama, Chandrakanta, which was based on a novel written by Devki Nandan Khatri in 1888.

=== Television work and film career (1990–2008) ===
He featured opposite Roopa Ganguly in Basu Chatterjee's critically acclaimed drama film Kamla Ki Maut (1989). In the 1990s, he appeared in the critically acclaimed films Ek Doctor Ki Maut (1990), and Such a Long Journey (1998), as well as various other films, which went unnoticed. In 1998, he played Valmiki in Sanjay Khan's serial Jai Hanuman. He also did an episode named "From Reel to Real' in horror television show Ssshhhh...Koi Hai in 2001.

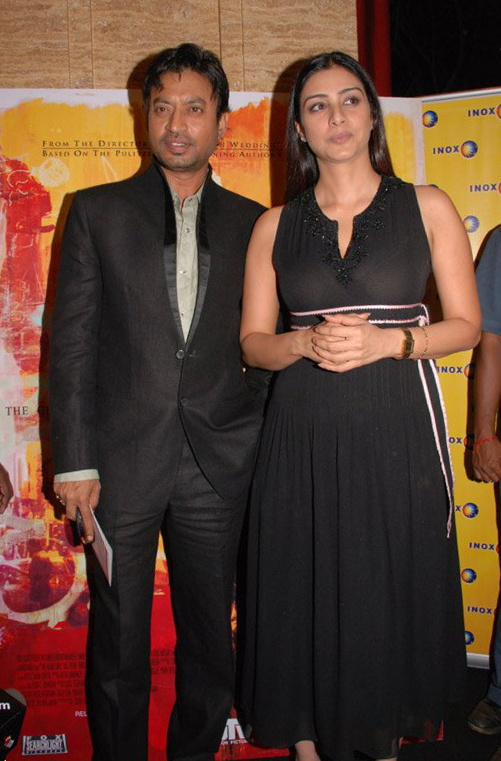
Irrfan Khan at the premiere of The Namesake with Tabu

Asif Kapadia cast him as the lead in The Warrior, a historical film completed in 11 weeks on location in Himachal Pradesh and Rajasthan. In 2001, The Warrior opened at international film festivals. Irfan Khan credited this film in preventing him giving up his acting career.

Between 2003 and 2004, he acted in Ashvin Kumar's short film, Road to Ladakh; the film received rave reviews at international festivals. That same year, he played the title role in the critically acclaimed Maqbool, an adaptation of Shakespeare's Macbeth.

His first Bollywood lead role came in 2005 with Rog. His performance was praised by critics; one wrote, "Irfaan's eyes speak louder than his words and every time he is in frame, be it talking to his buddy Manish or arguing with Suhel, he shows his capability as an actor". Thereafter, he appeared in several films either playing the leading role or a supporting role as a villain. In 2004, he won the Filmfare Best Villain Award for his role in Haasil. He also played an antagonist in the Telugu film Sainikudu.

In 2007, he appeared in the box office hits The Namesake and Life in a... Metro. His chemistry with Konkana Sen was one of the highlights of the latter; it also won him the Filmfare Best Supporting Actor Award. These roles were closely followed by his appearances in the international films, A Mighty Heart and The Darjeeling Limited. Despite his success in Bollywood, he continued to work on television. He anchored Mano Ya Na Mano (airing on STAR One), and hosted Kyaa Kahein.

=== International success (2008–2020) ===
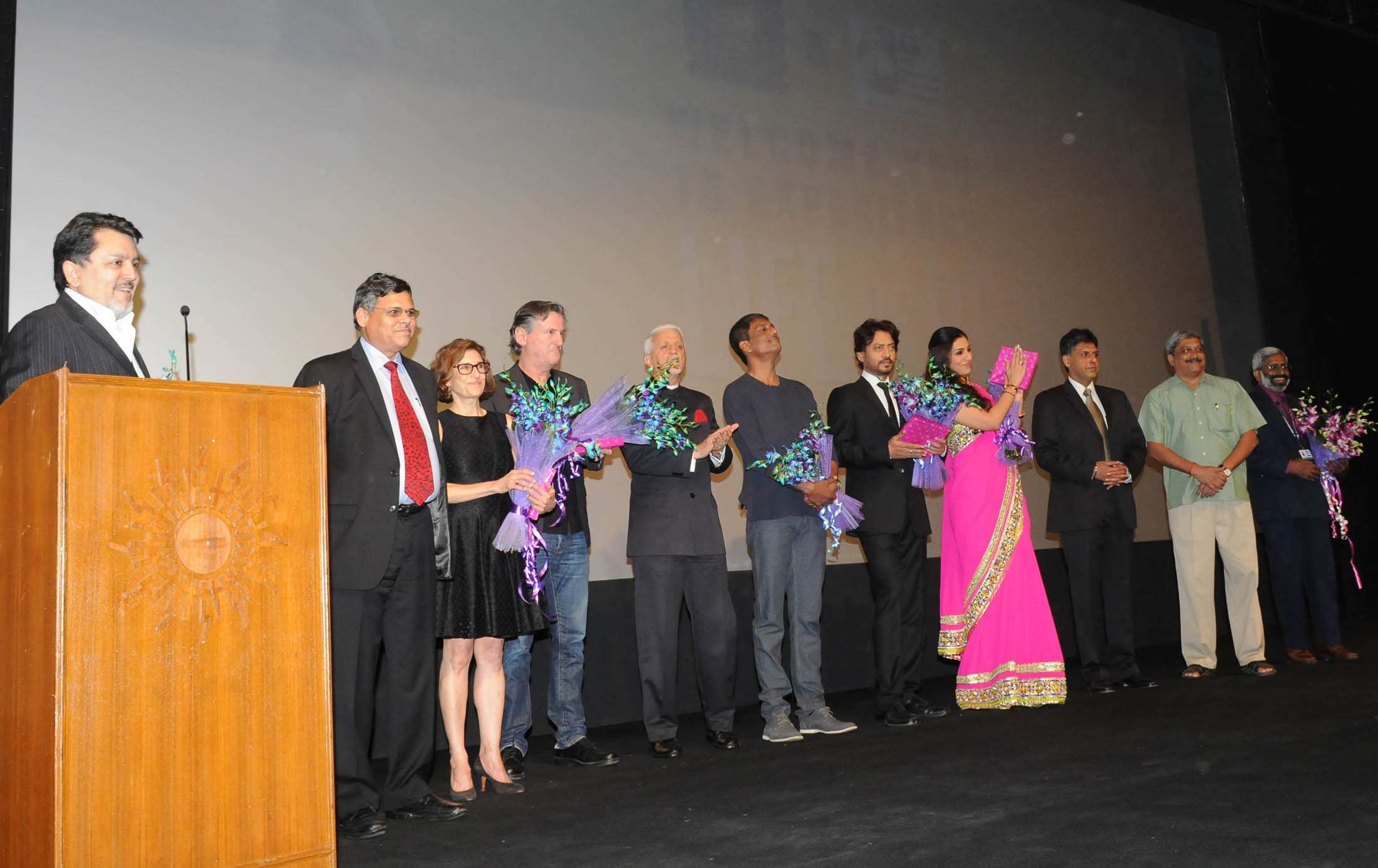
Khan with cast of Life of Pi in 2012.

Khan played a police inspector in the 2008 film Slumdog Millionaire, for which he and the cast of the movie won Screen Actors Guild Award for Outstanding Performance by a Cast in a Motion Picture. About him, Danny Boyle said, "he has an instinctive way of finding the 'moral centre' of any character, so that in Slumdog, we believe the policeman might actually conclude that Jamal is innocent." Boyle compared him to an athlete who can execute the same move perfectly over and over. "It's beautiful to watch."

In 2009, he featured in the film Acid Factory. He appeared as an FBI agent in New York (2009), and opposite Natalie Portman as a Gujarati diamond merchant in the Mira Nair-directed segment of the eleven-part feature New York, I Love You. In 2010, he worked on the third season of the HBO series In Treatment, enacting the part of Sunil, who is finding it difficult to come to terms with his wife's death and loneliness after moving to the New York City borough of Brooklyn.

Khan played Dr. Rajit Ratha in The Amazing Spider-Man in 2012. He played the adult version of Piscine "Pi" Molitor Patel in Ang Lee's film adaptation of Life of Pi, which became a critical and commercial success worldwide. His lead role in Paan Singh Tomar (2012), as the eponymous real-life athlete turned dacoit, won him the National Film Award for Best Actor. In 2013, he starred in The Lunchbox, which won the Grand Rail d'Or at Cannes Film Festival and received a BAFTA nomination, and became his highest-grossing Hindi film to date.

In 2014, Khan appeared in Gunday, which was a moderate box office success. He also made guest appearances in the films The Xposé and Haider, playing an important role in the latter. In 2015, he played the lead role in the film Piku alongside Deepika Padukone and Amitabh Bachchan. Khan co-starred in the 2015 film Jurassic World. In the same year, he also appeared in the acclaimed thriller Talvar in which his performance was praised. He appeared in Jazbaa in October 2015 alongside Aishwarya Rai which was very well received by critics. He was next seen alongside Tom Hanks in the 2016 adaptation of Dan Brown's Robert Langdon thriller Inferno. That same year, he also starred in Madaari, a 2016 Indian social thriller film directed by Nishikant Kamat. In December 2016, a report stated that comedy company AIB was producing Amazon Prime Video's first Indian original fiction show, Ministry, starring Khan. In October 2017, it was reported that Khan would play a washed-up Bollywood actor seeking to regain the love of the masses while appointed as a placeholder culture minister, but in August 2018, Khan left the project due to his health issues. The project was shelved eventually.

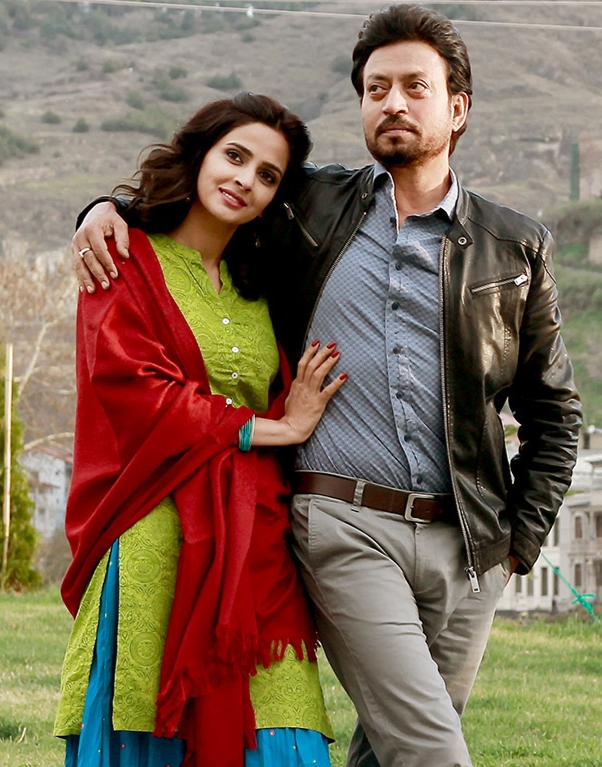
Khan with co-star Saba Qamar on the sets of Hindi Medium in 2017

In 2017, Khan appeared in two films, Hindi Medium which was commercially and critically successful. Khan's portrayal as Raj Batra in Hindi Medium earned him several accolades, one of which was the Filmfare Award for Best Actor. Hindi Medium became a sleeper hit in India and China, becoming his highest-grossing Hindi release, surpassing The Lunchbox. He also starred in No Bed of Roses (2017). As of 2017, his films had grossed $3.643 billion (₹237 billion) at the worldwide box office. His next release was Qarib Qarib Singlle opposite Parvathy Thiruvothu, who was making her debut in Hindi cinema.

In 2018, Khan appeared in Karwaan, with Dulquer Salmaan, Mithila Palkar and Kriti Kharbanda. He also appeared in Blackmail opposite Kirti Kulhari, the same year. His Hollywood film Puzzle also released in 2018.

Khan's final film appearance was in Angrezi Medium, directed by Homi Adajania, which was released on 13 March 2020.

== Other work ==
In September 2015, he was appointed the brand ambassador for "Resurgent Rajasthan", a campaign by the state government of Rajasthan. He lent his voice to the light and sound show at the war memorial for the Indian army at Vidhan Sabha Road, Jaipur. The show portrayed the valour and courage of Rajasthani soldiers, and their historic and modern triumphs in battle.

== Personal life ==
On 23 February 1995, Khan married actress, writer and fellow NSD graduate Sutapa Sikdar. They had two sons, actor Babil and Ayan.

In 2012, he changed the spelling of his first name from "Irfan" to "Irrfan"; he said he liked the sound of the extra "r" in his name. He later dropped "Khan" from his name because according to a 2016 interview, he wanted his work and not his lineage to define him.

== Illness and death ==
In March 2018, he announced on Twitter that he had been diagnosed with neuroendocrine cancer. He sought treatment in the UK for a year, and returned to India in February 2019.

Khan was admitted to Mumbai's Kokilaben Dhirubhai Ambani Hospital on 28 April 2020, where he started receiving treatment for a colon infection caused by the disease, but in course of the treatment, he died the next day, at the age of 53. His mother Saeeda Begum, aged 93, had died just four days prior in Jaipur.

Film personalities and literary figures around the globe paid tributes online upon the news of his death. Khan was buried at the Versova Kabristan in Mumbai and his last rites were performed by his sons.

== Accolades ==
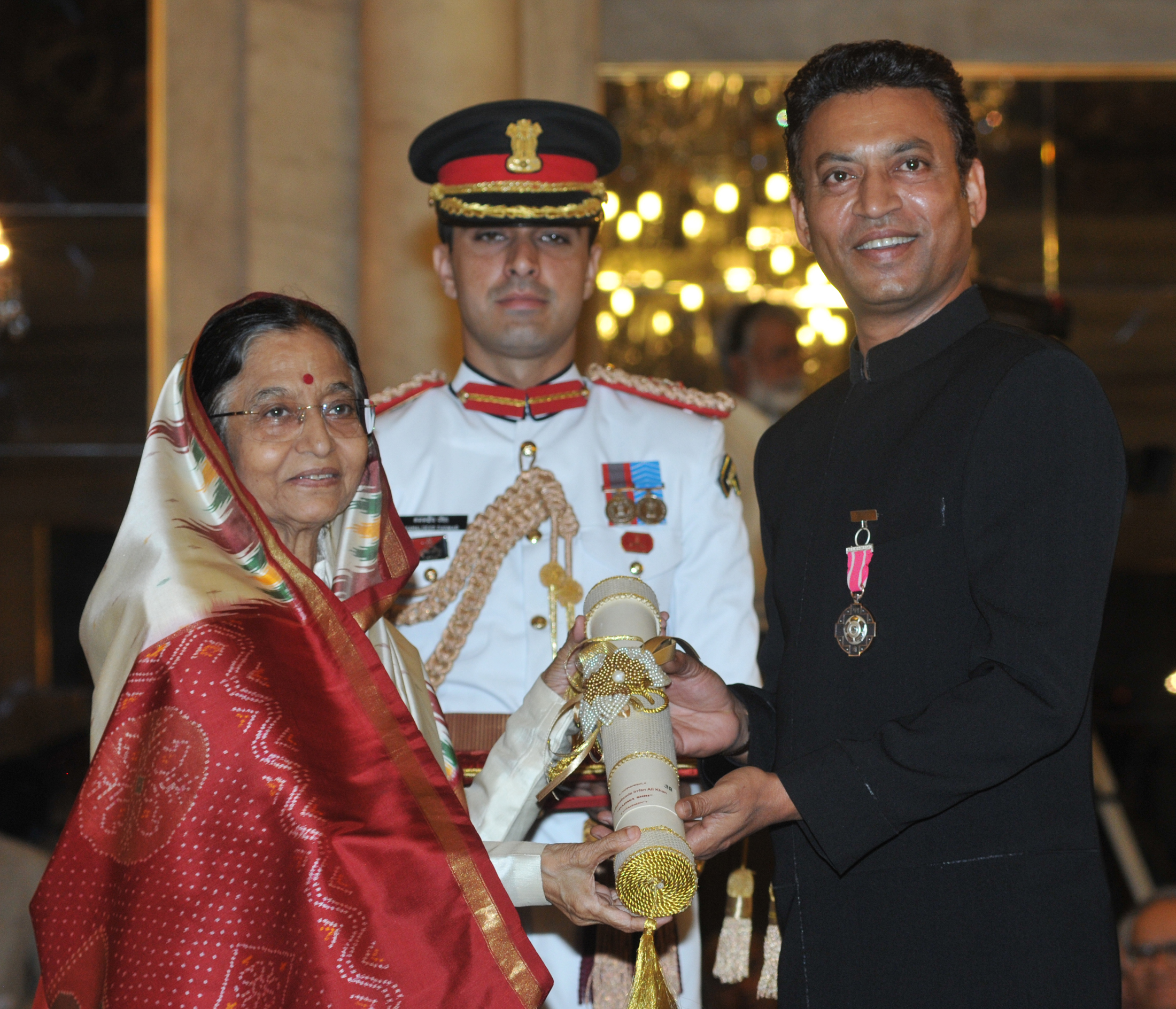
Khan receiving his Padma Shri in 2011

Year	Award	Nominated work	Category	Result	Ref(s).
2004	Filmfare Awards	Haasil	Best Villain	Won	
2007	Independent Spirit Awards	The Namesake	Best Supporting Male	Nominated	
2008	Filmfare Awards	Life in a... Metro	Best Supporting Actor	Won	
2011	Padma Shri	—	Arts	Won	
2013	National Film Awards	Paan Singh Tomar	Best Actor	Won	
2013	Filmfare Awards	Paan Singh Tomar	Best Actor	Nominated	
2013	Filmfare Awards	Paan Singh Tomar	Best Actor (Critics)	Won	
2014	Asian Film Awards	The Lunchbox	Best Actor	Won	
2018	Filmfare Awards	Hindi Medium	Best Actor (Critics)	Nominated	
2018	Filmfare Awards	Hindi Medium	Best Actor	Won	
2021	Filmfare Awards	Angrezi Medium	Best Actor	Won	
2021	Filmfare Awards	Angrezi Medium	Best Actor (Critics)	Nominated	
2021	Filmfare Awards	—	Lifetime Achievement Award	Honoured	
2022	IIFA Awards	Angrezi Medium	Best Actor	Nominated	
