= Bhavna Talwar =

Indian film director

Bhavna Talwar is an Indian film director. Her debut film, Dharm (2007), won the Nargis Dutt Award for Best Feature Film on National Integration at the 2007 National Film Award. It was also the closing film at the World Cinema Section at the Cannes Film Festival 2007 and was nominated for the Gucci Awards at Venice. Her second feature film Happi, was described as an “exquisite black-and-white homage to the great Charlie Chaplin - India's only genuine tribute to the genius of Charlie Chaplin”

Her next film Heidi (starring Bill Nighy, Mark Williams, Helen Baxendale) is US$30 million modern-day adaptation of the beloved children's film and has been picked by a major US studio for release around the world in 2021.

== Career ==
Bhavna Talwar started her career as a journalist at Asian Age, covering film, theatre, fashion, and later worked for over eight years as an assistant director with an advertising film company. She was nominated as agency producer for the "Rain - Reebok" commercial at the Cannes Ad Fest.

Her first film, Dharm (2007), starring Pankaj Kapur and Supriya Pathak, premiered as the closing film at the World Cinema Section at the Cannes Film Festival 2007.

Talwar caused a controversy by claiming that Dharm should have been selected as India's official Foreign Language Film submission for the 80th Academy Awards, but was rejected in favour of Eklavya: The Royal Guard because of the personal connections of the latter film's director and producer. She filed a complaint in the Bombay High Court in which she accused the Indian selection committee of bias, but later dropped it because the Foreign Language Film submission deadline had already passed.

== Filmography ==
| Year | Title | Director | Writer | Notes |
|---|---|---|---|---|
| 2007 | Dharm | Yes | | |
| 2019 | Happi | Yes | Yes | Released on ZEE5 |
