= Haasil (film) =

2003 Indian crime drama

- Directed by: Tigmanshu Dhulia
- Written by: Tigmanshu Dhulia
- Produced by: Karma Network Productions
- Starring: Jimmy Sheirgill; Hrishita Bhatt; Irrfan Khan; Ashutosh Rana
- Narrated by: Tinnu Anand
- Cinematography: Rafey Mehmood
- Edited by: Aseem Sinha
- Music by: Songs: Jatin–Lalit; Score: Abhishek Ray
- Production company: Karma Network
- Release date: 16 May 2003
- Running time: 161 minutes
- Language: Hindi
- Budget: ₹4 crore

Haasil is a 2003 Indian Hindi-language crime drama film directed by Tigmanshu Dhulia. It stars Jimmy Sheirgill, Hrishitaa Bhatt, Irrfan Khan and Ashutosh Rana. Irrfan Khan won the Filmfare Award for Best Actor in a Negative Role for his portrayal of Ranvijay Singh. The film is set and shot in and around Allahabad, Uttar Pradesh.

== Plot ==
The background of the movie is student politics at the University of Allahabad and the dirty turn it takes. When Anirudh meets Niharika at university, they quickly become romantically involved. Unfortunately, their relationship can't escape the political battles between two rival gangs of students headed by Gaurishankar Pandey and Ranvijay Singh. When Anirudh meets Ranvijay, who has eliminated Gaurishankar Pandey, the former believes that he is merely helping his fellow student.

Anirudh gets involved in violent politics and shoots Niharika's cousin accidentally. Ranvijay Singh helps him escape to Mumbai with the help of his aide. Anirudh later learns the truth about Ranvijay Singh, whose ultimate aim is to marry Niharika.

Badrishankar Pandey, the brother of the slain Gaurishankar Pandey, helps Anirudh kill Ranvijay in order to avenge the loss of his brother. A fierce gun battle takes place at the Kumbh Mela between the gangs of Ranvijay and Badrishankar Pandey before Anirudh kills Ranvijay. The Chief Minister, Kamalnath Tiwari, helps them escape the crime scene and gets Anirudh discharged from all the cases, as Ranvijay also blackmailed him.

== Cast ==
- Jimmy Sheirgill as Anirudh 'Ani' Sharma
- Hrishita Bhatt as Niharika Singh
- Irrfan Khan as Ranvijay Singh
- Ashutosh Rana as Gauri Shankar Pandey
- Varun Badola as Javed Khan
- Rajpal Yadav as Chhutku
- Sudhir Pandey as CM Kamalnath Tiwari
- Tinu Anand as Mr. Karan Sharma (Aniruddha's father)
- Sharat Saxena as Mr. Praveen Singh (Niharika's father)
- Brijendra Kala as Shugii (Newspaper Vendor)
- Rajendranath Zutshi as Jackson
- Murad Ali as Badri Shankar Pandey
- Rajiv Gupta as SP
- Navni Parihar as Niharika's Mother
- Dadhi Pandey as Munna (Ranvijay's Gang Member)
- Deepak Kumar Bandhu as Taufik (Ranvijay's Gang Member)
- Nissar Khan as Ranvijay's Gang Member
- Pankaj Jha as Gauri Shankar's Gang Member

== Soundtrack ==
Haasil

Soundtrack album by Jatin–Lalit
- Released: 27 February 2003
- Genre: Feature film soundtrack
- Length: 35:26
- Language: Hindi
- Label: Times Music
External audio
- Audio Jukebox on YouTube

The soundtrack features 7 songs composed by Jatin–Lalit, with lyrics from Israr Ansari, Kausar Pandey, Vindo Mahindra, Satyaprakash and Devmani Pandey. The background score of the film was composed by Abhishek Ray.

Tracklist
No.	Title	Lyrics	Singer(s)	Length
1.	"Aankhen Bhi Hoti Hai Dil Ki Zuban"	Israr Ansari	Abhijeet	04:51
2.	"Aankhon Mein Tumhari"	Kausar Pandey, Vindo Mahindra	Shaan, Shweta Pandit, Shraddha Pandit	04:25
3.	"Zindagi Ko Nayi Zindagi"	Israr Ansari	Udit Narayan, Sonali Bajpai	04:45
4.	"Kisi Ne Mera"	Kauser Pandey	Shaan	04:28
5.	"Ab Ghar Aaja"	Satyaprakash	Javed Ali	04:49
6.	"Police Case Na Ban Jaye"	Devmani Pandey	Richa Sharma	04:39
7.	"Tu Hi Tu"	Israr Ansari	Roop Kumar Rathod, Javed Ali	07:29
Total length:				35:26

== Awards ==
=== 2004 Filmfare Awards ===
- Won – Best Actor in a Negative Role – Irrfan Khan

== Reception ==
Kanchana Suggu of Rediff praised the acting performances of Ashutosh Rana, Tinnu Anand, Jimmy Shergill, Hrishita Bhatt and Irrfan Khan and said that, "Haasil is powerful, honest, real; it makes you cringe in your seat." Narendra Kusnur of Mid-Day found the film to have its moments "particularly in the picturisation of violent scenes and description of the vote-getting tactics that student leaders indulge in," and wrote of Irrfan: "His eyes have a certain wickedness and intensity that suit the role. Though he does remind you of Nana Patekar, he’s perfection personified." Taran Adarsh of Bollywood Hungama gave the film a rating of 2 out of 5 saying that, "Though the film has several gripping moments and a power-packed performance by Irfan Khan, the outcome is hampered when the movie drifts into predictable zone, post-interval." Shahid Khan of PlanetBollywood.com praised the acting performances of all actors and gave the film a rating of 8 out of 10 saying that, "Tigmanshu Dhulia directs the film with great skill. It is admirable the way he handles the scenes of violence. They make you sit up and take notice."

== Legacy ==
Haasil was featured in Avijit Ghosh's book, 40 Retakes: Bollywood Classics You May Have Missed.
