= Maqbool =

2004 Indian crime drama film directed by Vishal Bhardwaj

- Theatrical release poster
- Directed by: Vishal Bhardwaj
- Screenplay by: Vishal Bhardwaj; Abbas Tyrewala
- Story by: Vishal Bhardwaj; Abbas Tyrewala
- Based on: Macbeth by William Shakespeare
- Produced by: Bobby Bedi
- Starring: Irrfan Khan; Tabu; Om Puri; Pankaj Kapur; Naseeruddin Shah
- Cinematography: Hemant Chaturvedi
- Edited by: Aarif Sheikh
- Music by: Vishal Bhardwaj
- Distributed by: Kaleidoscope Entertainment Pvt. Ltd. Yash Raj Films
- Release dates: 10 September 2003 (Toronto International Film Festival); 30 January 2004 (India)
- Running time: 132 minutes
- Country: India
- Language: Hindi

Maqbool is a 2003 Indian Hindi-language crime drama film directed by Vishal Bhardwaj, starring Irrfan Khan, Tabu, Pankaj Kapur, Naseeruddin Shah, Om Puri, Piyush Mishra, Murali Sharma, and Masumeh Makhija in an adaptation of the play Macbeth by Shakespeare.

The plot of the film is based on that of Macbeth with regard to events and characterisation. The film did not perform remarkably at the box office, but won director Vishal Bhardwaj international acclaim. Apart from directing it, he had also composed the background score and songs for the film. Bhardwaj then moved on to adapting William Shakespeare's Othello in his 2006 film Omkara which won him further critical success. He then directed Haider in 2014 adapting Hamlet, leading to what is now called his Shakespeare trilogy. (Note: Interestingly the first letters M, O and H of Maqbool, Omkara and Haider are the same as the first letter of their Shakespearean source. It is intentional -if only to pay tribute to the original source- and not co-incidental.)

The film had its North American premiere at the 2003 Toronto International Film Festival. Though the film failed to garner much of an audience during its theatrical run in India, critics were appreciative and considered it a Cult film over the years. Pankaj Kapur went on to win a Filmfare Award for Best Actor (Critics) and a National Film Award for Best Supporting Actor. The film was screened in the Marché du Film section of the 2004 Cannes Film Festival.

== Plot ==
The film is based on William Shakespeare's Macbeth, with the Mumbai underworld as its backdrop. Miyan Maqbool (Irrfan Khan) is the right-hand man of Jahangir Khan (alias Abba Ji) (Pankaj Kapur), a powerful underworld don. Maqbool is grateful and feels a close connection and personal indebtedness to Abba Ji. Seeing their close relationship but also sensing Maqbool's ambition, two corrupt policemen (Om Puri and Naseeruddin Shah) predict that Maqbool will soon take over the reins of the Mumbai Underworld from Abba Ji.

Nimmi (Tabu) is Abba Ji's mistress, but she and Maqbool are secretly in love. Nimmi encourages Maqbool's ambitions and persuades him to kill Abba Ji to take over as Don. Maqbool is torn between his love for Nimmi and his loyalty to Abba Ji, but he begins to prepare the ground for becoming a Don by ensuring that others in the line of succession cannot interfere. Finally, Maqbool murders Abba Ji in cold blood while he is in bed at night, with Nimmi next to him. Maqbool gets away with the murder and takes over as Don, just as planned, but both he and Nimmi are haunted by guilt, seeing Abba Ji's ghost and unable to wash the blood from their hands. There is also suspicion, within the gang, of Maqbool's role in the death of Abba Ji, and eventually the lovers meet a tragic end.

In addition to the portrayals of the three tragic heroes, the film offers performances by supporting cast members, in particular Om Puri and Naseeruddin Shah. The two open the film in their roles as black comic relief corrupt police inspectors-cum-astrologers, predicting the fall of Abba Ji—who has them on his payroll—and the rise and fall of Maqbool. Contrary to the original play, the corrupt cops are not just passive soothsayers. In an effort to sustain what they refer to as "balancing forces," they are also actively involved in shaping events, like aiding in providing information to Abba Ji's enforcers to wipe out a rival gang, using subtle nuances in coercing Maqbool to shift loyalties, deliberately botching an "encounter" attempt on Riyaz Boti (Macduff) and subsequently setting up an alliance between a rival politician (the incumbent one was backed by Abba Ji) and a fleeing Guddu (Fleance) and Riyaz Boti against Maqbool.

== Cast ==
Actor	Character in the film	Character in the play
Irrfan Khan	Miyan Maqbool	Macbeth
Tabu	Nimmi	Lady Macbeth
Pankaj Kapur	Jahangir Khan (Abbaji)	Duncan I of Scotland
Om Puri	Inspector Rajkumar Pandit	Witch (Weird Sisters)
Naseeruddin Shah	Inspector R.S. Purohit	Witch (Weird Sisters)
Piyush Mishra	Kaka	Banquo
Ankur Vikal	Riyaz Boti	Macduff
Ajay Gehi	Guddu	Fleance
Masumeh Makhija	Sameera, Abbaji's daughter	Malcolm
Shammi Narang	Vikas Bhosle	
Pubali Sanyal	Riyaz Boti's wife	Lady Macduff
Master Raj	Riyaz Boti's son	Macduff's son
Gyanchand Rikhi	Mughal	Macdonwald
Manav Kaushik	Asif	Cawdor
Murali Sharma	Inspector Davsare	
Vinod Nahardri	Chinna	
Abbas Tyrewala	Sadiq Chikna	
Deepak Dobriyal	Thapa	
Firdaus Irani	Usmaan	
Vivek Mishra	Tawde	
Mohini Mathur	Badi bi	
Jaywant Wadkar	Palekar	
Jitendra Shrimali	Palekar's P.A.	
Bhupinder Sharma	Mohini's secretary	
Ramratan Sen	Ahmed	
Shankar Nihati	Kaka's murderer	
Dibyendu Bhattacharya	Chinna's killer	
Nadeem Khan	Badi bi's killer	
Richa Nayer	Doctor	
Sanjay Bhutiyani	Custom Officer	
Dayashankar Pandey	Masterji	

== Production ==
Irrfan Khan was selected to portray the lead role after attempts to sign Kamal Haasan, Akshay Kumar and Kay Kay Menon failed. In 2023, Vishal Bhardwaj revealed that the team had reached advanced discussions with Kamal Haasan, but the actor wanted the film to be a bilingual shot in Tamil and Hindi, with separate actors brought in for the Tamil version. Vishal Bharadwaj was unwilling to compromise on making the film just in Hindi, with Naseeruddin Shah also noting his reluctance to work with Kamal Haasan.

== Reception ==
Maqbool received universal critical acclaim. Rediff described the film as "a visual gallery that is an intelligent blend of dark, tragic overtones and comic, satirical undertones". Variety wrote that while the visuals are great, audiences might need an understanding of Macbeth to fully enjoy the film. India Today described it as a "haunting operatic tragedy". Outlook said that it "effectively transported the essence of the story to the milieu of the Bombay underworld of our times". Deccan Herald described the film as "Brooding, tragic and brilliant. 'Maqbool' with its satrical [sic] undertones is cinema at its best".

== Soundtrack ==
Maqbool

Soundtrack album by Vishal Bhardwaj
- Released: 2004
- Recorded: Nirvana Studio
- Genre: Film soundtrack
- Label: Music Today

The soundtrack features eleven songs composed by Vishal Bhardwaj with lyrics by Gulzar.

No.	Title	Length
1.	"Ru-Ba-Ru" (performed by Daler Mehndi, Rakesh Pandit, Sabir Khan, Dominique)	5:53
2.	"Jhin Min Jhini" (performed by Sadhana Sargam, Ustad Sultan Khan, Anuradha Sriram, Rakesh Pandit)	5:32
3.	"Rone Do" (performed by Rekha Bhardwaj)	5:02
4.	"Dheemo Re" (performed by Ustad Sultan Khan)	3:18
5.	"Maqbool Theme" (instrumental)	1:34
6.	"Rukhe Naina" (performed by Sanjeev Abhyankar)	5:14
7.	"Chingari" (performed by Rekha Bhardwaj)	4:26
8.	"Rin Din Din" (instrumental)	1:36
9.	"Nirvana" (instrumental)	1:53
10.	"Shoonya" (instrumental)	1:58
11.	"Jhin Min Jhini (extended)" (performed by Sadhana Sargam, Ustad Sultan Khan, Anuradha Sriram, Rakesh Pandit)	6:24
