= Saheb, Biwi Aur Gangster (film series) =

Indian film series

Saheb Biwi Aur Gangster (film series)
- Directed by: Tigmanshu Dhulia
- Written by: Tigmanshu Dhulia; Sanjay Chauhan (1, 3)
- Screenplay by: Tigmanshu Dhulia; Sanjay Chauhan (1, 3); Kamal Pandey (2)
- Story by: Tigmanshu Dhulia; Sanjay Chauhan (1, 3)
- Produced by: Rahul Mittra; Tigmanshu Dhulia; Nitin Tej Ahuja (2)
- Starring: Jimmy Sheirgill; Mahi Gill; Deepraj Rana; Randeep Hooda (1); Vipin Sharma (1); Rajiv Gupta (1-2); Irrfan Khan (2); Soha Ali Khan (2-3); Pravesh Rana (2); Raj Babbar (2); Sanjay Dutt (3); Chitrangda Singh (3); Deepak Tijori (3); Kabir Bedi (3); Nafisa Ali (3)
- Cinematography: Aseem Mishra (1); Yogesh Jani (2); Amalendu Chaudhary (3)
- Edited by: Rahul Srivastava (1-2); Pravin Angre (3)
- Music by: Abhishek Ray (1); Mukhtar Sahota (1); Ankit Tiwari (1); Jaidev Kumar (1); Anuj Garg (1); Sunil Bhatia (1); Amit Sial (1); Sandeep Chowta (2); Rana Mazumder (3); Anjjan Bhattacharya (3); Siddharth Pandit (3)
- Production companies: BrandSmith Motion Pictures (1-2); Tigmanshu Dhulia Films (1-2); Bohra Bros Production (1); Viacom18 Motion Pictures (2); Moving Pictures (2); Rahul Mittra Films (3); JAR Pictures (3)
- Distributed by: Bohra Bros Production (1); Viacom18 Motion Pictures (2); Raju Chadha (3)
- Release dates: 30 September 2011 (1); 8 March 2013 (2); 27 July 2018 (3)
- Running time: 387 minutes
- Country: India
- Language: Hindi
- Budget: ₹53 crore
- Box office: ₹46.23 crore

Saheb Biwi Aur Gangster (transl. The master, the wife and the gangster; Hindi pronunciation: [saːɦeːb biːbiː ɔːɾ]) is a series of Indian Hindi-language romantic thriller films co-written, co-produced and directed by Tigmanshu Dhulia. Its title was inspired by 1962's Bollywood film Sahib Bibi Aur Ghulam. The film series stars Jimmy Sheirgill as Aditya Pratap Singh (Saheb) and Mahi Gill as Madhavi Deva (Biwi). The first film named Saheb, Biwi Aur Gangster was released in 2011 and the second film Saheb, Biwi Aur Gangster Returns released in 2013. Both films received critical acclaim and perform moderate success at the box office. The third film Saheb, Biwi Aur Gangster 3 released in 2018 and received poor reviews from critics for its script and weak plotlines and became a disaster at the box office.

== Overview ==
=== Saheb Biwi Aur Gangster (2011) ===
Based in a small town in the state of Uttar Pradesh, Saheb Biwi Aur Gangster is a story packed with intrigue betrayal and ambition between a beautiful Raani (Mahi Gill), her Raja husband (Jimmy Sheirgill) and an ambitious young man Babloo (Randeep Hooda).

The Raja and his Raani live in their ancestral royal house trying to maintain the status and structure their ancestors had left behind. But due to the changing times, some extreme financial conditions and the long-gone habit of a royal having a mistress, Raja tries hard to maintain his status and financial conditions. His rival political party, belonging to Gainda Singh (Vipin Sharma), is on a constant mission to eliminate the Raja and his allies, to get a hold of the administration, which has been with this royal family for decades. Eventually, he is left with just one ally, Kanahiya (Deepraj Rana), who is Saheb's most trusted and dangerous servant. Due to the Raja's interest in his beautiful mistress, Raani yearns for his attention and tries to get him to return to her. The Raja starts taking contract killing assignments to be able to cope up with his lifestyle and to be able to get a stronger hold over his political situation while campaigning for the elections, which becomes a difficult battle considering the loss of his allies and deteriorating financial situation.

The drama deepens when the same rival gang plants Babloo (Randeep Hooda) to get information and plot the Raja's killing, as the temporary driver for Raani. Raani, saddened by the lack of her husband's attention and slightly hysterical due to the same, gets into a sexual relationship with Babloo who seems to be giving more of his time to her. In this process, Babloo falls deeply in love with Raani and confesses his assignment in front of Raja. The Raani uses Babloo to get the mistress killed to gain her husband. Babloo manages to fulfill her demand but in turn gets ambitious, wanting the Raani and the power which Saheb now holds for himself.

The climax is set at a point where Babloo has planned to execute Saheb and succeed in shooting him and Kanahiya. Later, Raani has Babloo shot dead stating that "he can only be a partner in the bedroom, but not as a Saheb". Saheb slowly recovering, as he wins the election. In the end, Raani is shown appointing a new driver for herself, which hints at a sequel.

=== Saheb Biwi Aur Gangster Returns (2013) ===
The Royal Scandal, the war for power, and fight for money continue with the return of Saheb Biwi Aur Gangster. Aditya Pratap Singh (Jimmy Sheirgill) is crippled and is trying to recover from the physical disability and his wife's betrayal. The lover cum seductress Madhavi Devi (Mahie Gill) is now an MLA, her relationship with Aditya may have broken to shambles but her relation with alcohol is deep, dark and daunting. Indrajeet Singh (Irrfan Khan), a ragged prince who has lost everything but his pride, pledges to get back his family's respect which was once destroyed by Aditya's ancestors. Ranjana (Soha Ali Khan) is a modern ambitious girl who is madly in love with Indrajeet Singh. The story takes a new turn when Aditya falls in love with Ranjana and forces Birendra, her father, for their marriage.

=== Saheb Biwi Aur Gangster 3 (2018) ===
Aditya (Jimmy Shergill) returns from jail and tries to reclaim his political legacy. On meeting London-based gangster Uday Pratap Singh (Sanjay Dutt), the war for the survival of the richest and the shrewdest begins.

== Cast ==
=== Saheb Biwi Aur Gangster ===
- Jimmy Sheirgill as Aditya Pratap Singh
- Mahi Gill as Madhavi Devi
- Randeep Hooda as Lalit / Babloo
- Vipin Sharma as Gaindha Singh
- Deepraj Rana as Kanhaiya
- Shreya Narayan as Mahua
- Deepal Shaw as Suman
- Mukesh Tyagi as Jaiswal
- Sharad Kakkar as Tandon
- Tigmanshu Dhulia in a special appearance
- Resham as Lalit's girlfriend
- Rajiv Gupta as MLA Prabhu Tiwari
- Mukti Mohan in an item number

=== Saheb Biwi Aur Gangster Returns ===
- Jimmy Sheirgill as Aditya Pratap Singh
- Mahi Gill as Madhavi Devi
- Irrfan Khan as Indrajeet Pratap Singh a.k.a. Raja Bhaiyya
- Soha Ali Khan as Ranjana
- Pravesh Rana as Param Pratap Singh
- Deepraj Rana as Kanhaiya
- Raj Babbar as Birendra Pratap a.k.a. Bunny
- Rajiv Gupta as MLA Prabhu Tiwari
- Charanpreet Singh as A journalist
- Sujay Shankarwar as Rudy
- Anjana Sukhani as item number
- Mugdha Godse in an item number "Media Se"
- Santosh Maurya as Thakur

=== Saheb Biwi Aur Gangster 3 ===
- Sanjay Dutt as Uday Pratap Singh
- Jimmy Sheirgill as Aditya Pratap Singh
- Mahi Gill as Madhavi Devi
- Deepak Tijori as Vijay, Uday Pratap Singh's Brother
- Chitrangada Singh as Suhani
- Soha Ali Khan as Ranjana(cameo)
- Kabir Bedi as Maharaja Hari Singh, Uday Pratap Singh's father
- Nafisa Ali as Raj Mata Yashodhara, Uday Pratap Singh's mother
- Deepraj Rana as Kanhaiya
- Pamela Singh Bhutoria as Deepal, Kanhaiya's daughter
- Zakir Hussain as Bunny uncle, Ranjana's father
- Rishina Kandhari as News reporter

== Recurring cast ==
Character	Film		
Character	Saheb, Biwi Aur Gangster (2011)	Saheb, Biwi Aur Gangster Returns (2013)	Saheb, Biwi Aur Gangster 3 (2018)
Aditya Pratap Singh	Jimmy Sheirgill	Jimmy Sheirgill	Jimmy Sheirgill
Madhavi Devi	Mahie Gill	Mahie Gill	Mahie Gill
Kanhaiya	Deepraj Rana	Deepraj Rana	Deepraj Rana
MLA Prabhu Tiwari	Rajiv Gupta	Rajiv Gupta	
Ranjana		Soha Ali Khan	Soha Ali Khan

== Crew ==
Occupation	Film		
Occupation	Saheb, Biwi Aur Gangster (2011)	Saheb, Biwi Aur Gangster Returns (2013)	Saheb, Biwi Aur Gangster 3 (2018)
Director	Tigmanshu Dhulia	Tigmanshu Dhulia	Tigmanshu Dhulia
Producer(s)	Rahul Mittra; Tigmanshu Dhulia	Rahul Mittra; Tigmanshu Dhulia; Nitin Tej Ahuja	Rahul Mittra; Tigmanshu Dhulia
Written By	Sanjay Chauhan; Tigmanshu Dhulia	Tigmanshu Dhulia	Sanjay Chauhan; Tigmanshu Dhulia
Cinematography	Aseem Mishra	Yogesh Jani	Amalendu Chaudhary
Editor	Rahul Srivastava	Rahul Srivastava	Pravin Angre
Composer(s)	Abhishek Ray; Mukhtar Sahota; Ankit Tiwari; Jaidev Kumar; Anuj Garg; Sunil Bhatia; Amit Sial	Sandeep Chowta	Rana Mazumder; Anjjan Bhattacharya; Siddharth Pandit

== Release and reception ==
Box office

Film	Release date	Budget	Worldwide Box Office
Saheb, Biwi Aur Gangster	30 September 2011	₹6 crore	₹10.75 crore
Saheb, Biwi Aur Gangster Returns	8 March 2013	₹19 crore	₹28.80 crore
Saheb, Biwi Aur Gangster 3	27 July 2018	₹28 crore	₹6.68 crore
Total		₹53 crore	₹46.23 crore

Critical reception

Film	Rotten Tomatoes
Saheb, Biwi Aur Gangster	N/A (2 reviews)
Saheb, Biwi Aur Gangster Returns	83% (6.5/10 average rating) (6 reviews)
Saheb, Biwi Aur Gangster 3	18% (4.5/10 average rating) (11 reviews)
