= Yaara =

2020 crime action film by Tigmanshu Dhulia

- Promotional poster
- Directed by: Tigmanshu Dhulia
- Written by: Tigmanshu Dhulia
- Based on: A Gang Story by Olivier Marchal
- Produced by: Tigmanshu Dhulia; Sunir Kheterpal
- Starring: Vidyut Jammwal; Shruti Haasan; Amit Sadh; Vijay Varma; Kenny Basumatary; Ankur Vikal
- Cinematography: Rishi Punjabi
- Edited by: Geeta Singh
- Music by: Clinton Cerejo
- Production companies: Tigmanshu Dhulia Films; Azure Entertainment
- Distributed by: ZEE5
- Release date: 30 July 2020
- Running time: 130 minutes
- Country: India
- Language: Hindi

Yaara (transl. Friend) is a 2020 Indian Hindi-language crime action film written and directed by Tigmanshu Dhulia and co-produced by Tigmanshu Dhulia Films and Azure Entertainment. The film stars Vidyut Jammwal, Shruti Haasan, Amit Sadh, Vijay Varma, Kenny Basumatary and Ankur Vikal. The film is an official remake of the 2011 French film A Gang Story. In the film, a gang reunites after several years to rescue a friend arrested by the cops.

Initially scheduled to release theatrically, Yaara premiered digitally through ZEE5 on 30 July 2020 and received mixed reviews from critics, who praised the cast performances, action sequences and technical aspects, but criticised its screenwriting and direction.

== Plot ==
1950s: Phagun and Mitwa are raised together by a man named Chand in Jaisalmer. When a gun made by Chand is used to kill a criminal's brother, Chand shoots himself in order to save Phagun and Mitwa, who teams up to burn down the criminal's house and escape. At the India–Nepal border, a man named Chaman recruits them as members of the Chaukdi Gang along with Rizwan and Bahadur. Together, they become friends and grow up as professional smugglers dealing with goods between India and Nepal. One day, a powerful gangster assigns the gang and his trusted aide Fakira to leave for Patna and rob a bank, but make it look like an act of naxalites.

After the heist, a shootout with cops leaves Chaman dead and the vengeful gang kills the gangster and his henchmen. Fakira later joins the gang and promises to be a loyal friend. The gang helps some villagers by beating up a corrupt landlord and provides food to them, following which they buy a piece of land for their activities. Phagun meets a college student named Sukanya who works for a political movement. Sukanya falls for Phagun after he fights corrupt cops to save her and an injured party member. The gang later goes to Sukanya's village, but Fakira leaves earlier.

During the night, the gang ends up in a shootout with the cops which results in the gang's torture and arrest. Rizwan and Bahadur are sentenced to seven years imprisonment, while Mitwa gets sentenced for four years and ten years imprisonment for Phagun. After a year, Sukanya meets him and reveals that she was also arrested, but left after being assaulted. They get married after Phagun is released and reunited with Rizwan and Bahadur. The gang suspects Fakira as well as Mitwa, who starts working for Shakeel and had left behind a 2-year-old son with Tanuja in Delhi. Following his and Sukanya's marriage, Phagun starts a land business.

1997: JCP Jasjit Singh meets Phagun, Rizwan and Bahadur to inform them about Mitwa's capture. Sukanya doesn't want Phagun to get involved, but Phagun is adamant about helping Mitwa and gets him rescued with the help of Tanuja's abusive husband Madan and two other men, who are later killed. Mitwa later reveals a petty case landed him into prison for 6 months and his pregnant girlfriend Tanuja married Madan. A criminal and former partner named Shakeel is after him because Mitwa, who worked for the Romania-based Durrani, felt underpaid and ran away after stealing money. Phagun later arrives home to find an effigy inscribed with a message to hand over Mitwa.

The gang is worried and decides to keep Tanuja at Bahadur's house along with her son Tinku, where Shakeel arrives and kills Tanuja and Bahadur. The gang learns about this from Jasjit and kills Shakeel by luring him into a trap with the help of Rizwan's lover. Jasjit thanks Phagun for taking out Shakeel, but still wants him to hand over Mitwa. While going to a marriage function, Sukanya reveals that Tinku spoke of the killers talking to Durrani, which worries Phagun. At the function, an assassin shoots Rizwan and his married girlfriend Sonya in the restroom.

Willing to end the conflict, Phagun flies to Romania to meet Durrani, where he finds out it is none other than Fakira. Phagun kills Fakira and fights off his guards before escaping back to India, where he meets privately with Jasjit and learns it was Mitwa who gave the gang's names to the police and eventually served the shortest sentence. Phagun then meets Mitwa and tells him that he knows about his betrayal. However, Phagun gives the passport and tickets along with a gun to Mitwa before Jasjit arrives with his team to arrest a guilt-ridden Mitwa, who finally shoots himself. Back home, Phagun sees Tinku playing piano with his and Sukanya's son Arjun.

== Cast ==
- Vidyut Jammwal as Phagun Gadoriya aka Paramveer
- Shruti Haasan as Sukanya
- Amit Sadh as Mubharak Shehriya aka Mitwa
- Vijay Varma as Rizwan Sheikh
- Kenny Basumatary as Bhimsen Thapa aka Bahadur
- Mohommed Ali Shah as Jasjit Singh
- Sanjay Mishra as Chaman
- Ankur Vikal as Fakira / Durrani
- Shreya Narayan as Tanuja
- Mariska Pokharel
- Rajiv Gupta as Magistrate Nand Kishore Verma

== Soundtrack ==
Yaara

Soundtrack album by Gourov-Roshin, Shaan, Ankit Tiwari and Siddharth Pandit
- Released: 20 July 2020
- Recorded: 2015–16
- Genre: Feature film soundtrack
- Length: 22:02
- Language: Hindi
- Label: T-Series
External audio
- Official Audio Jukebox on YouTube

The film's music was composed by Gourov-Roshin, Shaan, Ankit Tiwari and Siddharth Pandit, while lyrics were written by Prashant Ingole, Sunil Sirvaiya, Manoj Muntashir and Rev Shergill.

Track listing
No.	Title	Lyrics	Music	Singer(s)	Length
1.	"Har Dafaa"	Prashant Ingole, Sunil Sirvaiya	Gourov-Roshin, Shaan	Shaan, Shruti Rane	3:42
2.	"Bhedi"	Manoj Muntashir	Ankit Tiwari	Ankit Tiwari, Aishwarya Majmudar	4:35
3.	"Khudkushi"	Rev Shergill	Siddharth Pandit	Rev Shergill	4:56
4.	"Beparvah"	Rev Shergill	Siddharth Pandit	Rev Shergill	4:11
5.	"Bikhar Gaye"	Rev Shergill	Siddharth Pandit	Rev Shergill	4:38
Total length:					22:02

== Release ==
Yaara premiered through ZEE5 on 30 July 2020. Initially intended for theatrical release, this was dropped in favour of a digital release due to the COVID-19 pandemic resulting in theatres being closed.

== Critical reception ==
On the review aggregator website Rotten Tomatoes, 0% of 7 critics' reviews are positive, with an average rating of 4/10.

Jyoti Kanyal of India Today gave 2.5/5 stars and wrote "Yaara has its moments, though sporadically, which will keep you wanting for more till the end. However, the slow pace of the film, poor editing and screenplay make it less impressive." Saibal Chatterjee of NDTV gave 2/5 stars and wrote "Yaara has its moments, but they are simply too few and far between to make an impact and change the course of the film. This outing has no chance of being ranked among Dhulia's best works. It is far too wayward to sustain audience interest all the way through."

Shubhra Gupta of The Indian Express gave 2/5 stars and wrote "Yaara should have been a uniformly fast-paced ride, studded with interesting performances, but it works only sporadically." Pooja Darade of Koimoi gave 2/5 stars and wrote "Yaara has some good moments but many bad moments. The story, that had a lot of potentials to be a great movie, turned out to be average, but you won’t be disappointed with the performances by any actor."

Pradeep Kumar of The Hindu wrote "Directed by Tigmanshu Dhulia, ‘Yaara’ is a combination of an unimaginative story stitched together using a weird screenplay that throws you off rails." Samrudhi Ghosh of Hindustan Times wrote "If Tigmanshu Dhulia’s earlier films -- Paan Singh Tomar, Haasil and Saheb Biwi Aur Gangster -- were to be used as a yardstick, Yaara is a colossal disappointment. It lacks verve and is too sprawling to hold interest and attention till the end."
