= Holy Cow (2022 film) =

2022 Indian comedy film

- Official Release Poster
- Directed by: Sai Kabir
- Written by: Sai Kabir
- Produced by: Aaliya Siddiqui; Baljinder Khanna; Seema Narula; Shivani Bhargav
- Starring: Sanjay Mishra; Tigmanshu Dhulia; Mukesh S. Bhatt; Sadiya Siddiqui
- Cinematography: Yogesh Jani
- Edited by: R. C. Pranav; Steven H. Bernard
- Music by: Sukhwinder Singh; Rev Shergill
- Production companies: K Sera Sera Limited; Y S Entertainment; Sukh Sagar Films; Reltic Pictures
- Release date: 26 August 2022
- Country: India
- Language: Hindi

Holy Cow is a 2022 Indian Hindi-language satirical comedy film written and directed by Sai Kabir. Starring Sanjay Mishra,Tigmanshu Dhulia, Sadiya Siddiqui and Nawazuddin Siddiqui in a cameo appearance. It released on 26 August 2022.

== Cast ==
- Sanjay Mishra as Salim Ansari
- Tigmanshu Dhulia as Shamshuddin
- Mukesh S. Bhatt
- Sadiya Siddiqui as Safiya
- Nawazuddin Siddiqui
- Rahul Mittra
- Hemendra Dandotiya
- Himanshu Pandey

== Music ==
The music of the film is composed by Sukhwinder Singh and Rev Shergill.

No.	Title	Lyrics	Music	Singer(s)	Length
1.	"Gaiya Kahaan"	Rev Shergill	Rev Shergill	Rev Shergill
2.	"Madari"	Sukhwinder Singh	Sukhwinder Singh	Sukhwinder Singh, Simran Bhardwaj
3.	"Bulleya"	Bulleh Shah, Rev Shergill	Rev Shergill	Rev Shergill
