= Paan Singh Tomar =

Indian soldier, athlete (1932–1981)

Subedar Paan Singh Tomar
- Tomar in 1956

Personal information
- Born: 1 January 1932 Bhidosa, Tonwagarh District, Gwalior State, British India (present-day Morena District, Madhya Pradesh, India)
- Died: 1 October 1981 (aged 49) Rathiya Pura, Bhind District, Madhya Pradesh, India
- Height: 6 ft 1 in (1.85 m)
- Military career
- Allegiance: India
- Branch: Indian Army
- Rank: Subedar
- Unit: Bengal Engineer Group
- Cause of death: Police encounter
- Occupations: Army officer; Athlete; Rebel

Sport
- Sport: Track and field
- Event: 3000 Metres Steeplechase
Medal record
Representing India

Subedar Paan Singh Tomar (1 January 1932 – 1 October 1981) was an Indian soldier, athlete, and rebel (Baaghi). He served in the Indian Army, where his talent for running was discovered. He was a seven-time national steeplechase champion in the 1950s and 1960s, and represented India at the 1958 Asian Games. After a premature retirement from the army, Tomar returned to his native village. He later gained notoriety as a Daku of Chambal Valley, when he resorted to violence after a land feud there. In late 1981, Tomar was killed in a police encounter, in a village of Bhind district in Madhya Pradesh.

== Early life ==
Paan Singh Tomar was born in the small village of Bhidosa, near Porsa, in a Hindu Rajput family, living on banks of the Chambal River, in the erstwhile Tonwarghar district of the princely state of Gwalior, under the rule of the British Raj in India. Tomar's father was Eashwari Singh Tomar, whose younger brother Dayaram Singh Tomar went on to sire a branch of the Tomar family that owns most of the fertile agricultural land in and around the Bhidosa area. Tomar would later go on to murder Babbu Singh Tomar, his nephew and Dayaram Singh Tomar's grandson, in 1977 following a shady land dispute in which Tomar was cheated out of land.

== Army career ==
Paan Singh Tomar served as a subedar in 51 Engineer Regiment, Bengal Engineer Group, based at Roorkee. He was a champion sportsman, a national-ranking athlete, back in the 1950s and 60s. Legend has it that his initiation into serious running came off a dispute. When Tomar had just enrolled in his regiment, he got into an argument with an instructor. As punishment, Tomar was ordered to run numerous laps of the parade ground. As he ran, he caught the eye of the other officers. What they saw, impressed them and soon Tomar was exempted from his regular duties and was put on the special diet for army sportsmen and enjoyed other perks and benefits.

== Sports career ==
He represented India at the 1958 Asian Games in Tokyo, Japan. Tomar was not interested in steeplechase running at first but discovered it in the military. But after his sport's coach request him to run steeplechase. He went on to be the national champion of steeplechasing for seven years. His national record of 9 minutes and 2 seconds in the 3000-meter steeplechase event remained unbroken for 10 years. The army did not allow him to fight in the 1962 Sino-Indian War and Indo-Pakistani War of 1965 due to his career in sports, which ended in 1972.

== After retirement ==
Upon retiring in 1977, Tomar returned to Bhidosa village. There arose a land dispute between him and his nephews Jandel Singh, Havaldar Singh, and Babbu Singh Tomar. Babbu Singh Tomar was a powerful landowner, who owned seven licensed guns and was the head of the 200-strong extended Tomar family. To solve the dispute, a panchayat (congregational meeting) was held with the collector, where Paan Singh was asked to give ₹3,000 to Babbu Singh Tomar and his siblings, to keep his own land. Tomar obliged, but his own nephew, Balwant Singh Tomar, retaliated for the duplicity. The collector promised to return in 15 days. In the meantime, Babbu Singh Tomar came to Tomar's house and assaulted his 95-year-old mother who was alone in the household at the time. Following Tomar's return, he learnt what his mother had undergone. Balwant and Tomar went to the fields armed where they found Babbu Singh. Tomar then shot at Babbu Singh, who continued to run for about a kilometer before he collapsed, despite being shot several times. Tomar would later give an interview to a local newspaper in Gwalior, which may have prompted the administration to start taking his case seriously. At that time, there was a price of ₹10,000 on his head. He stated in the interview that he did not want to kill the eight villagers, whose tip-off led to the killing of his elder brother Matadin Singh Tomar. But he could not stop his nephew Balwant, who was Matadin's son.

== Death ==
On October 1, 1981, the Circle Inspector Mahendra Pratap Singh Chauhan, and his special task force of 500 policemen, cornered and shot Tomar before leaving him for dead. 14 other members of his crew were also killed. The standoff and gunfight lasted over 12 hours. Chauhan had been tipped off about Tomar's arrival by Motiram Jatav, one of the village Dalits who was angered by Tomar's discriminatory attitude.

According to newspaper reports, Tomar was shot when he was alive and was asking for water: "Any Rajput here who could please give me some water?"; Havildar Tribhuwan Singh started walking towards Tomar with some water but Circle Inspector Chauhan shouted at him: "Tribhuwan, dacoits have no caste." And he was left to die.

== Paan Singh's family ==
Paan Singh's son, Souram Singh Tomar (b. 1959) is a retired Indian Army subedar who lives in Babina in the Jhansi District of Uttar Pradesh. He moved there to flee the violence in Bhidosa.

== In popular culture ==
A biographic film, Paan Singh Tomar, was released in 2012, to much critical acclaim. It was written by Sanjay Chouhan and directed by Tigmanshu Dhulia. It starred Irrfan Khan as Paan Singh Tomar, and Mahie Gill as his wife.

== See also ==
- Jagga Jatt
- Phoolan Devi
- Seema Parihar
- Veerappan
