= Saheb, Biwi Aur Gangster =

2011 Indian film by Tigmanshu Dhulia

Saheb Biwi Aur Gangster
- Theatrical Release Poster
- Directed by: Tigmanshu Dhulia
- Written by: Tigmanshu Dhulia; Sanjay Chauhan
- Produced by: Tigmanshu Dhulia; Rahul Mittra
- Starring: Jimmy Sheirgill; Mahi Gill; Randeep Hooda
- Cinematography: Aseem Mishra
- Edited by: Rahul Srivastava
- Music by: Abhishek Ray; Mukhtar Sahota; Ankit Tiwari; Jaidev Kumar; Anuj Garg; Sunil Bhatia; Amit Sial
- Production companies: Rahul Mittra Films; Brandsmith Motion Pictures; Tigmanshu Dhulia Films; Bohra Bros Production
- Distributed by: Bohra Bros Production
- Release date: 30 September 2011
- Running time: 123 minutes
- Country: India
- Language: Hindi
- Budget: ₹60 million
- Box office: ₹107.5 million

Saheb Biwi Aur Gangster (transl. The master, the wife and the gangster; Hindi pronunciation: [saːɦeːb biːbiː ɔːɾ]) is a 2011 Indian Hindi-language romantic thriller film directed by Tigmanshu Dhulia, and written by Sanjay Chauhan. The film stars Jimmy Sheirgill, Mahi Gill, and Randeep Hooda in lead roles. It is the first installment of Saheb, Biwi Aur Gangster film series. The film was released on 30 September 2011.

== Plot ==
Based in a small town in Uttar Pradesh, Saheb Biwi Aur Gangster is a story packed with intrigue, betrayal, and ambition between a beautiful Raani, her husband Raja, and an ambitious young man, Babloo.

The Raja and his Raani live in their ancestral royal house, trying to maintain the status and structure their ancestors had left behind. But due to the changing times, some extreme financial conditions, and the long-gone habit of a royal having a mistress, Raja tries hard to maintain his status and financial conditions. His rival political party, belonging to Gainda Singh, is on a constant mission to eliminate the Raja and his allies and to get a hold of the administration, which has been with this royal family for decades. Eventually, he is left with just one ally, Kanhaiya, who is Saheb's most trusted and dangerous servant. Due to the Raja's interest in his beautiful mistress, Raani yearns for his attention and tries to get him to return to her. The Raja starts taking contract killing assignments to be able to cope up with his lifestyle and to be able to get a stronger hold over his political situation while campaigning for the elections, which becomes a difficult battle considering the loss of his allies and deteriorating financial situation.

The drama deepens when the same rival gang plants Babloo to get information and plot the Raja's killing as the temporary driver for Raani. Raani, saddened by the lack of her husband's attention and slightly hysterical due to the same, gets into a sexual relationship with Babloo, who seems to be giving more of his time to her. In this process, Babloo falls deeply in love with Raani and confesses his assignment in front of Raja. The Raani uses Babloo to get the mistress killed to gain her husband. Babloo manages to fulfill her demand but in turn gets ambitious, wanting the Raani and the power that Saheb now holds for himself.

The climax is set at a point where Babloo has planned to execute Saheb and succeeds in shooting him and Kanhaiya. Later, Raani has Babloo shot dead, stating that "he can only be a partner in the bedroom, but not as a Saheb." Saheb is slowly recovering as he wins the election. In the end, Raani is shown appointing a new driver for herself, which hints at a sequel.

== Cast ==
- Jimmy Sheirgill as Aditya Pratap Singh
- Mahi Gill as Madhavi Devi
- Randeep Hooda as Lalit / Babloo
- Shreya Narayan as Mahua
- Deepal Shaw as Suman
- Rajiv Gupta as MLA Prabhu Tiwari
- Deepraj Rana as Kanhaiya
- Vipin Sharma as Gaindha Singh
- Kanika Dang as Badi Rani, Aditya's mother
- Sonal Joshi as Rukma, Madhavi's maid
- Sitaram Panchal as Sundar
- Rahul Mittra as Chief Minister
- Brijendra Kala as Arms Dealer
- Mukti Mohan as an item dancer (special appearance)

== Production ==
The budget of the film was ₹60 million. Its title was inspired by that of Sahib Bibi Aur Ghulam (1962).

== Soundtrack ==
Saheb Biwi Aur Gangster

Studio album by Amit Sial, Sunil Bhatia, Mukhtar Sahota, Jaidev Kumar, Anuj Garg, Abhishek Ray, Ankit Tiwari
- Genre: Feature film soundtrack
- Label: Bb Music Studio

=== Track list ===
No.	Title	Music	Singer(s)	Length
1.	"Chu Chu Chu"	Sunil Bhatia	Parthiv Gohil	4:18
2.	"Jugni"	Jaidev Kumar	Babbu Maan	5:29
3.	"Main Ek Bhanwara"	Amit Sial	Shail Hada	4:33
4.	"I Love To Love You"	Anuj Garg	Rekha Bhardwaj	4:45
5.	"Saheb Bada Hathila"	Ankit Tiwari	Vipin Aneja, Ankit Tiwari	5:08
6.	"Ankhian"	Mukhtar Sahota	Arif Lohar	4:30
7.	"Raat Mujhe"	Abhishek Ray	Shreya Ghoshal	3:20
8.	"Chu Chu Chu (Acoustic)"	Sunil Bhatia	Debojit Saha	4:18

== Reception ==
=== Critical reception ===
Saheb, Biwi Aur Gangster received critical acclaim from top critics. Taran Adarsh from Bollywood Hungama rated it 3.5/5 stars applauding its powerful plot, engaging script, commanding dialogue, and super performances. Nikhat Kazmi from the Times of India gave the film 4/5 stars calling the film a "must watch". Aniruddha Guha from DNA India gave the film 4/5 stars and said, "Saheb Biwi Aur Gangster draws you in from the very start, keeps you hooked throughout, and ends on a high." Guha also applauded the perfect mix of romance, action, and humour in the film. Ayaz Shaikh from Rediff.com commended the film and said "Saheb Biwi Aur Gangster is a gripping tale of intricate politics, love and betrayal", and gave the film 3.5/5 stars.

=== Box office ===
Saheb, Biwi Aur Gangster collected around ₹09.2 million nett on its first day of its release. Saheb, Biwi Aur Gangster remained on the lower side with around ₹35.1 million nett over its first weekend. Saheb, Biwi Aur Gangster remained steady but on the lower side on the weekdays as it grossed ₹55.2 million nett approx in its first week. It is grossed ₹107.5 million at the end of its theatrical run.

== Awards and nominations ==
Star Screen Awards

- Nominated: Best Actor In A Negative Role (male)—Jimmy Sheirgill
- Nominated: Best Actress In A Negative Role (female)—Mahi Gill

Filmfare Awards

- Nominated: Best Actress—Mahi Gill
- Nominated: Best Screenplay—Tigmanshu Dhulia

Stardust Awards (Stardust Searchlight Awards)

- Won: Best Director—Tigmanshu Dhulia
- Nominated: Best Film—Rahul Mittra
- Nominated: Best Actor—Jimmy Shergill
- Nominated: Best Actress—Mahi Gill

Zee Cine Awards

- Nominated: Best Actor in a Negative Role—Jimmy Shergill

IIFA Awards

- Nominated: Best Actress—Mahi Gill
- Nominated: Best Supporting Actor—Randeep Hooda

Apsara Awards

- Nominated: Best Actress in a Leading Role—Mahi Gill
- Nominated: Best Actor in a Supporting Role—Randeep Hooda
- Nominated: Best Story—Sanjay Chouhan and Tigmanshu Dhulia
- Nominated: Best Editor—Rahul Srivastava

== Sequel ==
Following the huge critical success of the film, a sequel was announced. Principal shooting started in April 2012 and was completed in October 2012. The sequel, titled Saheb, Biwi Aur Gangster Returns, was released on 8 March 2013. It starred Jimmy Sheirgill and Mahi Gill, who reprised their roles from the previous film, as well as new additions Irrfan Khan and Soha Ali Khan. Raj Babbar and Mugdha Godse also appeared in the film.

A third sequel, titled Saheb, Biwi Aur Gangster 3, was released on 27 July 2018.
