= Rahul Mittra =

Indian film actor and producer (born 1970)

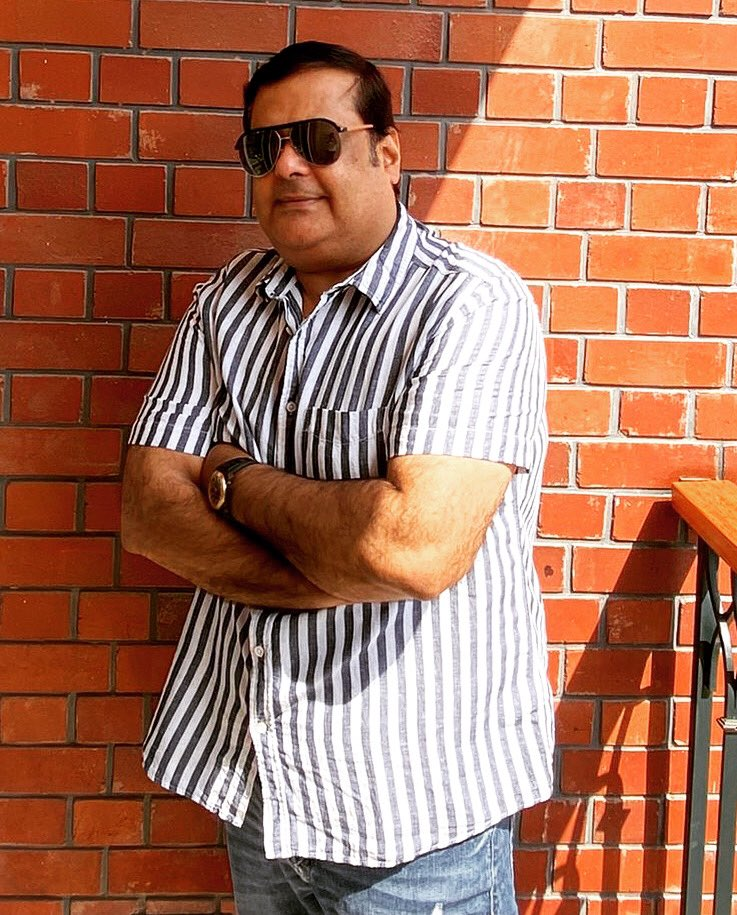
- Born: 13 October 1970 (age 55); India
- Occupations: Actor, producer

Rahul Mittra is an Indian film producer, actor and founder of Rahul Mittra Films, Brandsmith & Brandsmith Motion Pictures. He has produced Saheb, Biwi Aur Gangster (2011), Saheb, Biwi Aur Gangster Returns (2013), Bullett Raja (2013), Revolver Rani (2014), Sarkar 3 (2017), Saheb, Biwi Aur Gangster 3 (2018), Cabaret (2019) and Torbaaz, starring Sanjay Dutt, Nargis Fakhri, Rahul Dev & Rahul Mittra which was premiered on Netflix by Rahul Mittra Films.

A former journalist from the Times of India, Rahul Mittra is a branding expert and communication expert and has won multiple awards for his films and innovative business practices including Amity Leadership Award, Uttar Pradesh Gaurav Samman, numerous Best Producer Awards at Norway, Poland, San Francisco, Vietnam, Hungary, Uttarakhand, Mizoram, Kashmir & Tashkent Film festivals. In his second innings at the Times of India Group, Rahul started an initiative called Medianet whereby editorial spaces of the publication were monetised for brand endorsements, making it one of the most controversial initiatives in Indian media history ever and a big money spinner.

== Early life ==
Rahul Mittra did his schooling from St. John's High School Chandigarh and then Modern School Barakhamba Road, Delhi after his bureaucrat father late M.P. Mittra (IAS) got posted to Delhi in the Ministry of Home Affairs. He then graduated in Political Science from Hindu College, Delhi University after which Rahul pursued his MA in International Studies with specialisation in diplomacy from the School of International Studies, Jawahar Lal Nehru University (JNU). Rahul was then picked up by The Times of India as Sub-Editor cum reporter in 1994 where he regularly wrote on diverse topics ranging from politics, youth issues, crime, culture & foreign affairs. Rahul Mittra dabbled in diverse arenas like Journalism, Brand management, Tourism, IT and Business Consulting before becoming a filmmaker with his debut hit film Saheb Biwi aur Gangster in 2011. He has nearly three decades of experience in media, brand management, corporate communication, marketing, government relations, business consulting and promotions & is known to synergise multiple businesses.

== Film career ==
Rahul Mittra's Saheb biwi aur Gangster changed the context of Indian cinema from NRI centric films to Indian heartland, apart from the lives of everyone involved including director Tigmanshu Dhulia and actors Jimmy Sheirgill, Randeep Hooda & Mahie Gill. Rahul Mittra has worked closely with top actors including Amitabh Bachchan, Sanjay Dutt, Irrfan Khan, Saif Ali Khan, Manoj Bajpayee, Arjun Rampal, Randeep Hooda, Jimmy Sheirgill, Rahul Dev, Raj Babbar, Gulshan Grover, Chunky Pandey, Kangana Ranaut, Sonakshi Sinha, Yami Gautam, Nargis Fakhri, Richa Chadha, Chitrangda Singh, Mahie Gill, Soha Ali Khan amongst others.

Rahul Mittra has also presented many films like Vicky Kaushal starrer Zubaan, Manoj Bajpai starrer Saat Uchakey, Prithviraj Kapoor starrer Nanak Naam Jahaj Hai re-release, Arshad Warsi starrer Legends of Michael Misra, Randeep Hooda starrer Main aur Charles, Manisha Koirala starrer Dear Maya & Arjun Rampal starrer Daddy.
