= Dial 1975 =

2026 Indian Hindi film

- Directed by: Navneet Behal; Vibhu Kashyap
- Written by: Maitrey Bajpai; Ramiz Ilham Khan; Megha Rana
- Produced by: Niranjan Das; Kabir Lovee; Ranaksh Rana
- Starring: Kay Kay Menon; Pravessh Rana; Kirti Kulhari
- Cinematography: Dani Salo
- Edited by: Som Chavan
- Music by: Moses Christopher
- Production company: Spherecho Productions
- Distributed by: Waves OTT
- Release date: 21 August 2026
- Running time: 121 minutes
- Country: India
- Language: Hindi

Dial 1975 is an Indian Hindi-language action-thriller film directed by Navneet Behal, and Vibhu Kashyap. The film stars Kay Kay Menon, Pravessh Rana, and Kirti Kulhari in the lead roles, with Tom Alter, Uday Chandra, Govind Pandey, and Shubham Vardhan in supporting roles. The film was released on 21 August 2026 on Waves OTT.

== Plot ==
During the Emergency, a powerful politician secretly orders a wireless phone from Germany for secured communication. When the deal goes wrong, a group of government officials, criminals, and others get caught up in the hunt for the phone and the deal money.

== Cast ==
- Kay Kay Menon as Govind
- Pravessh Rana as Prakash
- Kirti Kulhari as Meena
- Tom Alter as Irish
- Vishwanath Chatterjee as Gorakhnath
- Uday Chandra as Thapar
- Govind Pandey as Ram Avtar
- Shubham Vardhan

== Reception ==
Abhishek Srivastava of The Times of India wrote in a review "Dial 1975 never knows how to bring all its pieces together. It has the ingredients for an engaging thriller, but the screenplay and direction leave you with the feeling that a much better film was possible." Rahul Desai of The Hollywood Reporter India wrote in a review "The Emergency-era thriller, starring Kay Kay Menon and revolving around the race to weaponise India's first wireless phone is scattered, strange and disorienting at best."

== External Link ==
- Dial 1975 at IMDb
