= Dongri Ka Raja =

2016 film directed by Hadi Ali Abrar

Dongri ka Raja
- Poster
- Directed by: Hadi Ali Abrar
- Written by: M. Saleem
- Screenplay by: M. Saleem
- Produced by: PS Chhatwal; Filmy Keeda Productions
- Starring: Ronit Roy; Ashmit Patel; Gashmeer Mahajani; Reecha Sinha
- Edited by: Bunty Nagi
- Music by: Original Music: Asad Khan; Background Score: Amar Mohile; Lyricist: Vijay Vijawatt
- Distributed by: TORQUE
- Release date: 11 November 2016
- Country: India
- Language: Hindi

Dongri ka Raja (transl. The king of Dongri) is a 2016 Indian Hindi-language action-drama directed by Hadi Ali Abrar and produced by PS Chhatwal and Filmy Keeda Productions. It is set against the backdrop of the Dongri underworld and follows the love story of an underworld "raja" (king) of Dongri. It was released on 11 November 2016.

== Plot ==
Raja (Gashmeer Mahajani) is the adopted son and sharpshooter of Dongri's most famous don Mansoor Ali (Ronit Roy). Mansoor wants Raja to success in his place, so he trained him faithfully and treated him as his blood son. Raja never failed any mission given by Mansoor. When killing people, Raja always wears a police uniform with the name of Siddhanth (Ashmit Patel), to pretend to be a police officer conducting operations, which makes Siddhanth blamed for many times. During one of his operations, Raja meets Shruti and falls for her. However, Raja feels hopeless about his love for Shruti because of his profession. Unaware of Raja's real identity and profession, Shruti gradually falls for him too.

Inspector Siddhant, who's in charge of Mansoor's case, disappoints his seniors for his failure to close the case. Damie (Kamlesh Sawant), is a corrupted officer who's bribed by Mansoor. He arrests an innocent man and threatens to kill him if he doesn't claim responsibility for the murders. After the innocent man "pleads guilty," Damie kills him.

Shruti invites Raja to a religious ceremony held in the area ruled by Daya (Sacheen Suvarna), Raja and Mansoor's enemy. Raja's fellows try to discourage him from risking his life to attend the ceremony, but Raja insists to meeting Shruti. During the ceremony, Raja is attacked by Daya but he manages to survive and is admitted to a hospital. In the hospital, Siddhanth shows up and tries to reveal Raja's real identity to Shruti. However, Raja denies Siddhanth's accusation and Shruti chooses to believe her lover.

After Raja returns home, he and Shruti confess their love to each other. Mansoor always wants Raja to fulfill his dream, which is to be another don like him. His mother (Ashwini Kalsekar) thinks the father's dream is less important than son's love and happiness. She then encourages Raja to talk to Shruti's parents about their marriage.

Shruti's father doesn't agree with Raja and Shruti's marriage because he feels Raja is lying about his profession. Raja then decides to elope with Shruti and marry without telling her parents, During their wedding, Inspector Siddhanth arrives with a group of armed officers to arrest Raja, telling him that the bride is in fact his younger sister, who pretended to be in love with him to get close to him and collect evidence of his crimes. Shruti's mission is completed and Raja is arrested while all his fellows are killed during their attempt to escape.

Raja's mother then approaches to Shruti and tells her that Raja's love has changed him a lot. He was a don and a criminal who killed without hesitation, but now he's not in the mood of being a don any more. Even after he knows he was cheated by her, he still loves her a lot. Shruti is moved and suddenly realizes that her pretended love for Raja has already been true. She then rejects to testify against Raja in the court, making Raja released.

In his house, Mansoor is angry about his son being cheated and orders him to kill Shruti and Raja agrees. Shruti risks her life to rush to Raja's house and takes him out to apologize and confess her true love to him. At this very moment, Siddhanth and his men show up to shoot Raja, making Raja feel being cheated again. Raja shoots Shruti and manages to escape.

Rajs is later told that Shruti survived the gunshot and is admitted to a hospital, he then decides to go to the hospital to kill her again. in the hospital, Shruti confesses her love to Raja again, making Raja unable to shoot her and is later arrested again by Siddhanth.

Damie frees Raja with his greater power than Siddhanth's. Siddhanth then kills Damie in the public and calling the crowd who's already angry with Mansoor and Damie's crime to testify against Raja for Damie's murder. Siddhanth arrests Shruti with a Cover-up charge, and Raja loses his mind after he realizes their love for each other is both true and solid.

Raja breaks his relation with Mansoor, who never supports his love but always wants him to be a don; he then forcefully saves Shruti from the police and escapes with her. On their way of escaping from the city, they get married. But their happy days last for no longer than 2 days before they are caught again at one of the checkpoints that Siddhanth set to catch them. In the impasse, Raja takes Shruti as a hostage with an empty gun (an act that was told to Shruti) to demande Siddhanth give him free passage.

Siddhanth shoots Raja and kills him. The film ends.

== Cast ==
- Ronit Roy as Mansoor Ali, a underworld don
- Gashmeer Mahajani as Raja (based on Dawood Ibrahim)
- Ashmit Patel as Inspector Siddhanth
- Reecha Sinha as Shruti
- Ashwini Kalsekar as Raja's mother
- Sacheen Suvarna as Daya
- Kamlesh Sawant as Sadashiv Damie, corrupt inspector
- Kumar Saurabh as Goonga
- Mukesh Tiwari as Qawwali singer
- Sunny Leone in the item number "Choli Block Buster"

== Soundtrack ==
=== Track listing ===
No.	Title	Singer(s)	Length
1.	"Naina"	Altamash Faridi	5:16
2.	"Piya Tu Piya"	Arijit Singh, Chinmayi Sripaada	6:14
3.	"Madad Al Madad (Qawwali)"	Javed Ali, Bela Shende	6:53
4.	"Choli Block Buster"	Mamta Sharma, Shivangi Bhayana, Meet Bros	4:32
