= Surjit Khan =

Punjabi singer of Indian descent (born 1972)

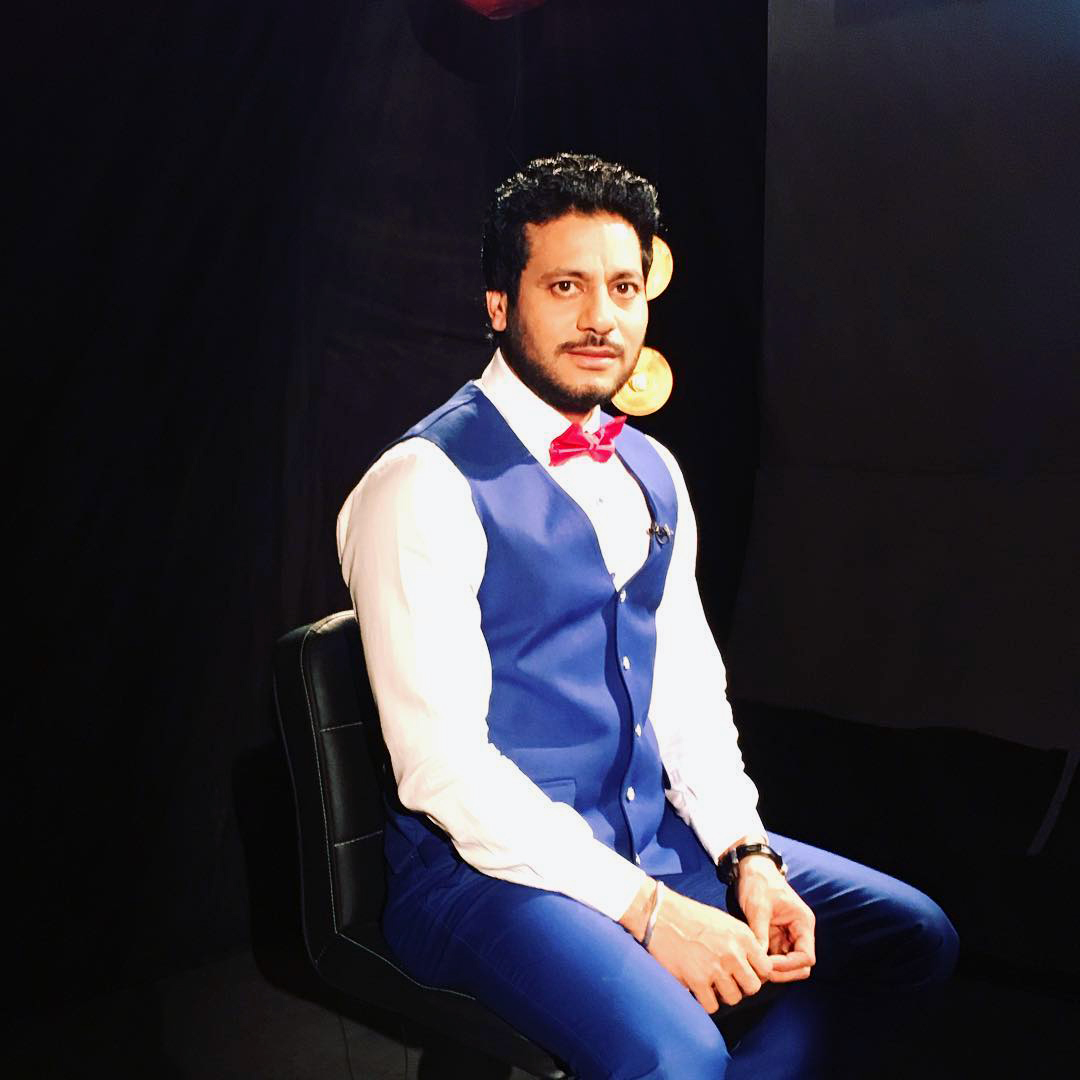

Background information
- Born: 1 March 1972 (age 53)
- Origin: Barana, Punjab
- Genres: Bhangra, Indi-pop
- Occupation(s): Record producer, musician, music director, singer-songwriter
- Years active: 1995 - present
- Labels: MovieBox, United Kingdom; Music Waves, Canada; StarMakers, India

Surjit Khan (born 1 March 1972) is a Punjabi musician and singer-songwriter. His album in 2009 Headliner which Ravi Bal produced Surjit Khan's Album. His two old albums which Sukhpal Sukh produced are Dupatta in 2006 & Neendraan in 2007. Surjit Khan's New Film called Meri Chargay Jawani Sohniyeh which Joy-Atul will be producing. He is of Indian descent. His last album was out in August 2014 called "Qawali" composed by: Tru-Skool, Jeeti, Kubs Matharu & Gupsy Aujla.

== Discography ==
Year	Song	Record label	Music
2020	Gallan Pyar Diyan - Single	Headliner Records & Internal Music	Mukhtar Sahota
2018	Sazaa - Single	Headliner Records & Internal Music	Mukhtar Sahota
2017	Jhanjharan - Single	Headliner Records & Internal Music	Mukhtar Sahota
2017	Dil Di Kitaab - Single	Headliner Records & Internal Music	Mukhtar Sahota
2017	Truck Union - Single	Headliner Records	Ravi RBS
2017	Stubborn - Single	Headliner Records	Ravi RBS
2016	Khainte Wala Gabru- single	Headliner Records	Aman Hayer
2013	American Desi 2 (Tere Vangu Nachna)	MovieBox	DJ Sanj
2012	Headliner 2	Kamlee Records/T-Series	Ravi Bal
2009	Headliner	Kamlee Records/Speed Records	Ravi Bal
2007	Neendraan	Kamlee Records/Planet Recordz/Speed Records	Sukhpal Sukh & Bhinda Aujla
2006	Dupatta	T-Series	H. Jogi
2005	Husn	T-Series	Sukhpal Sukh
2003	Sajjna Naal Yaari	Saregama	Sachin Ahuja
2002	Tera Pyar Vairne	Kamlee Records/T-Series	Sukhpal Sukh
2001	Pyar Diyan Doran	Crazy Series	Surinder Bachan
2000	Kikli Pa Ke	Saregama	Surinder Bachan
1998	Long	Sur Sangam Entertainment	Atul Sharma
1996	Balle Ishqa	CMC/Re-released by T-Series	Surinder Bachan
1994	Yaari Mere Naal Laake	Catrack Entertainment	Surinder Bachan
1993	Nain Do Vakeel Tere	Catrack Entertainment	Surinder Bachan

== Filmography ==
Release	Film	Role	Label
2010	Simran		Darshan Art International
2012	Meri Chargay Jawani Sohniyeh	Jatinder Salala	Speed Records
2012	Jatt Di Cadbury	Jeeti Malwa	MovieBox/Speed Records
