= Aatishbazi Ishq =

Aatishbazi ishq
- Theatrical release poster
- Directed by: Amit Subhash Dhawan
- Written by: Amit Subhash Dhawan & Jagjit Saini
- Produced by: Mahie Gill Geeta Wadia
- Starring: Mahie Gill; Roshan Prince Kulbhushan Kharbanda B.N. Sharma Tanya Abrol Introducing : Ravinder
- Cinematography: Raaja Phadtare
- Music by: R.Sheen
- Production company: Pride Motion Pictures
- Distributed by: Globe Moviez Pvt. Ltd
- Release date: 14 October 2016
- Country: India
- Language: Punjabi

Aatishbazi ishq is a drama film, Punjabi film directed by Amit Subhash Dhawan starring Mahie Gill and Roshan Prince that was released on 14 October 2016.

== Cast ==
- Mahie Gill
- Roshan Prince
- Kulbhushan Kharbanda
- B.N. Sharma
- Tanya Abrol
- Introducing : Ravinder

== Soundtrack ==
No.	Title	Singer(s)	Length
1.	"Mere Dil"	Roshan Prince, Neeti Mohan
2.	"Tere Ser Chad Ke"	Roshan Prince, Sudesh Kumari
3.	"Aatishbazi Ishq"	Sukhwinder Singh
4.	"Chandre Di Nazar Buri"	Sunidhi Chauhan, Supriya Joshi
5.	"Ishq Ishq"	Roshan Prince, Labh Janjua
