= Pal Pal Dil Ke Ssaat =

- Promotional Poster
- Directed by: V.K.Kumar
- Written by: V.K.Kumar
- Produced by: Sukra Arts Motion Picture Producers
- Starring: Ajay Jadeja; Vinod Kambli; Mahi Gill; Satish Shah; Sushma Seth; Vivek Mishra
- Cinematography: Ramesh Nautiyal; Pushan Kriplani
- Edited by: Kanu Prajapati
- Music by: Abhishek Ray background music Nikhil-Vinay
- Release date: 10 April 2009
- Running time: 135 minutes
- Country: India
- Language: Hindi

Pal Pal Dil Ke Ssaat is a 2009 Hindi-language film directed by V.K.Kumar, starring Ajay Jadeja, Vinod Kambli, Mahi Gill, Satish Shah and Sushma Seth.

== Plot ==
An under-fifteen age cricket team led by a millionaire boy accidentally meets Vinod Kambli, a charismatic cricketer, who has written a film script, and is looking for someone to finance his first film project. The millionaire captain of the team promises Vinod Kambli to finance the film if he and his friends like the story and, of course, on some conditions merely to safe guard his financial interests.

Pal Pal Dil Ke Ssaat revolves around a billionaire, disciplined, but compassionate grandmother Mrs. Kapoor (Sushma Seth) and her carefree, fun-loving grandson Ajay Kapoor (Ajay Jadeja). Their relationship touches and overlaps the boundary of love and hate.

A conspiracy to give trouble and rob the wealth of the innocent grandmother by the mastermind conman John Abraham (Satish Shah) ends up including Ajay and his lady love Dolly (Mahie Gill) in his team, which invites the wrath of a funny mafia don Makhan Singh (Tanvir Azmi), who hires a crazy killer Pannicker (Vivek Mishra) to kill Mrs. Kapoor.

== Cast ==
- Ajay Jadeja as Ajay Kapoor
- Mahie Gill as Dolly
- Vinod Kambli as Himself
- Satish Shah as John Abraham
- Sushma Seth as Mrs. Kapoor
- Vivek Mishra as Paniker
- Anshul Nagar as Vinit Khanna
- Tanvir Azmi as Makhan Singh
