= Reecha Sinha =

Indian actress

- Born: 12 February 1996 (age 29)
- Occupation: Actress
- Years active: 2014–present
- Parent(s): Rajkumarprasad Sinha, Vibha Sinha

Reecha Sinha (born 12 February 1996) is an Indian actress and model. She has played lead roles in the Hindi film "Dongri Ka Raja" alongside Gashmeer Mahajani and Ronit Roy. She appeared in the Punjabi music video "Gud Khake" with Shantanu Maheshwari.

== Career ==
Sinha had a breakthrough role in 2016 with the Hindi film Dongari Ka Raja. In 2019, she played a pivotal role with Ali Fazal, in Dhulia's Milan Talkies.

As a model, she appeared in commercials for Flite Footwear, Skinnsi, Koovs, Revlon, Godrej, Bikaji Bhelpuri, FCUK, Timex, Renee, Boddess Beauty and Everteen.

== Filmography ==
- All films are in Hindi, unless otherwise noted.

Year	Title	Role	Notes	Ref.
2011	Mahaan Kanakku	Anjali	Tamil film	
2016	Dongari Ka Raja	Shruti		
2019	Milan Talkies	Babli		
2020	Gud Khake		Music Video	

== Web series ==
She worked in a web series titled Zoo - Infotainment, presented by Dropout Media & directed by Shubham Dolas.

== See also ==
- Cinema of India
- Bollywood
- Reecha Sharma
