= Cabaret (2019 film) =

- Directed by: Kaustav Narayan Niyogi
- Written by: Zuhaebb Kaustuv Narayan Niyogi
- Produced by: Pooja Bhatt; Bhushan Kumar; Rahul Mittra
- Starring: Richa Chadda; Gulshan Devaiah; S. Sreesanth
- Cinematography: Edward Lutyens
- Edited by: Pooja Bhatt
- Music by: Kaustav Narayan Niyogi
- Production companies: Fisheye Network Private Limited; T-Series
- Distributed by: ZEE5
- Release date: 9 January 2019
- Running time: 95 minutes
- Country: India
- Language: Hindi

Cabaret is a 2019 Indian romantic drama thriller dance film directed by Kaustav Narayan Niyogi, produced by Pooja Bhatt, Rahul Mittra and Bhushan Kumar under the banner of Fisheye Network private limited. Principal photography of the film began around 9 June 2015. Originally scheduled for a 2016 release, alleged copyright violations led to delays before its eventual release on 9 January 2019. It was released on the ZEE5 on 9 January 2019.

== Plot summary ==
Roza, a small-town cabaret dancer, embarks on an intriguing journey as she intends to enter the world of entertainment and achieve success.

== Cast ==
- Richa Chadda as Rajeshsri / Roza
- Gulshan Devaiah as Gaurav
- S. Sreesanth as Chetta Don aka Nand Shah
- Gulshan Grover as Salim
- Vipin Sharma as Police Inspector
- Akshay Anand as Victor (Roza's manager)
- Sharad Kapoor as Vikram Batwal (Ex-IB Officer)
- Manoj Pahwa as Newspaper owner
- Jyothi Rana as Meera (Roza's friend)
- Rajat Kaul as Nawaab
- Sujata Sanghamitra as Neena (Gaurav's boss)
- Rahul Roy as Actor in 'Paani Paani' song

== Soundtrack ==
The soundtrack of the film is composed by Kaustav Narayan Niyogi and Munish Makhija except for the song "Phir Teri Bahon Mein", which is composed by Tony Kakkar. The soundtrack consists of 6 songs. The background music is composed by Bapi Tutul.

No.	Title	Singer(s)	Length
1.	"Paani Paani"	Sunidhi Chauhan	03:47
2.	"Phir Teri Bahon Mein"	Sonu Kakkar
3.	"Biwi Sanam Singer"	Usha Uthup
4.	"Do Anjaane"	Roop Kumar Rathod
5.	"Aakhri Shaam"	Bhoomi Trivedi
6.	"Mohe Aaye Na Jag Se Laaj"	Neeti Mohan

== Reception ==
Rahul Desai of Film Companion called it "one of the worst Hindi movies of the decade." Indo-Asian News Service wrote, "Cabaret is a comedy masquerading as a drama of a doomed damsel's distressful adventures. Even the lovemaking scenes are a howl."
