= Saheb, Biwi Aur Gangster 3 =

2018 Indian film by Tigmanshu Dhulia

Saheb Biwi Aur Gangster 3
- Theatrical release poster
- Directed by: Tigmanshu Dhulia
- Written by: Tigmanshu Dhulia; Sanjay Chauhan
- Produced by: Rahul Mittra; Tigmanshu Dhulia
- Starring: Sanjay Dutt; Jimmy Sheirgill; Mahi Gill; Chitrangada Singh
- Cinematography: Amalendu Chaudhary
- Edited by: Pravin Angre
- Music by: Songs: Rana Mazumder; Anjjan Bhattacharya; Siddharth Pandit; Score: Dharma Vish
- Production companies: Rahul Mittra Films; JAR Pictures
- Distributed by: Raju Chadha
- Release date: 27 July 2018
- Running time: 140 minutes
- Country: India
- Language: Hindi
- Budget: ₹28 crore
- Box office: ₹10.20 crore

Saheb Biwi Aur Gangster 3 (transl. The master, the wife and the gangster 3) is a 2018 Indian Hindi-language crime thriller film directed by Tigmanshu Dhulia. It is the sequel to the 2013 film Saheb, Biwi Aur Gangster Returns and the third installment of Saheb, Biwi Aur Gangster film series.

The film stars Sanjay Dutt, Jimmy Sheirgill, Mahi Gill and Chitrangada Singh. It was released on 27 July 2018 and received negative reviews from critics.

== Synopsis ==
The royal saga of deceit, conspiracy, greed and lust continues as the two gangsters are pitted against an enemy and everyone involved is scheming ruthlessly for their own personal gain.

== Cast ==
- Sanjay Dutt as Uday Pratap Singh
- Jimmy Sheirgill as Aditya Pratap Singh
- Mahi Gill as Madhavi Devi
- Deepak Tijori as Vijay Pratap Singh, Uday Pratap Singh's Brother
- Chitrangada Singh as Suhani
- Soha Ali Khan as Ranjana(cameo)
- Kabir Bedi as Maharaja Hari Singh, Uday Pratap Singh's father
- Nafisa Ali as Raj Mata Yashodhara, Uday Pratap Singh's mother
- Deepraj Rana as Kanhaiya
- Pamela Bhutoria as Deepal, Kanhaiya's daughter
- Zakir Hussain as Bunny uncle, Ranjana's father
- Rishina Kandhari as News Reporter

== Production ==
=== Development ===
In May 2017, it was announced that Sanjay Dutt had joined the cast and would be playing the role of a gangster in the film. In August 2017, it was reported that Chitrangada Singh had been signed opposite Sanjay Dutt in the film.

=== Filming ===
Principal photography commenced in September 2016 in Bikaner, Rajasthan. After completing the first schedule in October 2017, the production moved to Jodhpur for the second schedule of the film which continued until November 2017. The final schedule of shooting was completed in January 2018 in Mumbai.

== Soundtrack ==
Saheb, Biwi Aur Gangster 3

Soundtrack album by Rana Mazumder, Anjjan Bhattacharya and Siddharth Pandit
- Released: 30 June 2018
- Recorded: 2017–2018
- Genre: Feature film soundtrack
- Length: 35:02
- Language: Hindi
- Label: Saregama Music
External audio
- Official Audio Jukebox on YouTube

Rana Mazumder chronology
Saheb, Biwi Aur Gangster 3 (2018)	Milan Talkies (2019)

The soundtrack was composed Rana Mazumder, Anjjan Bhattacharya, and Siddharth Pandit while the lyrics were written by Sandeep Nath, Revant Shergill, Kausar Munir, Kumaar and Raja Mehdi Ali Khan.

Track listing
No.	Title	Lyrics	Music	Singer(s)	Length
1.	"Baba Theme Song"	Revant Shergill	Siddharth Pandit	Revant Shergill	04:24
2.	"Kesariya Jugni"	Kumaar	Anjjan Bhattacharya	Nooran Sisters, Amit Gupta	04:20
3.	"Lag Jaa Gale" (Original composition by Madan Mohan)	Raja Mehdi Ali Khan	Recreated by: Rana Mazumder	Jonita Gandhi; original singer:Lata Mangeshkar	04:07
4.	"Andheron Mein Rishtey"	Sandeep Nath	Rana Mazumder	Arijit Singh	04:59
5.	"Aye Huzoor"	Kausar Munir	Rana Mazumder	Sunidhi Chauhan, Shaan	04:42
6.	"Dil Ka Parinda"	Sandeep Nath	Rana Muzumder	Usha Uthup, Rana Muzumder	04:23
7.	"Andheron Mein Rishtey" (Female Version)	Sandeep Nath	Rana Muzumder	Manndakini Bora	04:30
8.	"Davaa Bhi Woh"	Kausar Munir	Rana Muzumder	Saberi Bhattacharya	03:37
Total length:					35:02

== Reception ==
On the review aggregator website Rotten Tomatoes, 18% of 11 critics' reviews are positive, with an average rating of 4.5/10.

Ronak Kotecha from The Times of India rated the film at 3.5 out of 5. Udita Jhunjhunwala for Mint wrote "The weakest of the trilogy, this story takes exceedingly long to set up the key players and their motivations. Dhulia does end part three neatly poised for a follow-up. That might work too, as long as Gill and Sheirgill are at the epicentre and the gangster is not required to dance and sing romantic songs amidst sand dunes." Saibal Chatterjee for NDTV wrote "It has taken the third Saheb, Biwi Aur Gangster instalment five years to take shape. One had expected time to add value to it. That does not seem to have happened. Devoid of the delirious energy, sly swerves and deeply melancholic core that defined the earlier entries, Saheb, Biwi Aur Gangster 3 struggles for the most part to hit the ground and run."
