= Milan Talkies =

2019 film by Tigmanshu Dhulia

- Theatrical release poster
- Directed by: Tigmanshu Dhulia
- Written by: Tigmanshu Dhulia; Kamal Pandey; Abhishek Mazumdar
- Produced by: P.S. Chhatwal Om Prakash Bhatt
- Starring: Ali Fazal; Shraddha Srinath; Ashutosh Rana; Reecha Sinha; Sanjay Mishra; Sikandar Kher
- Cinematography: Hari K. Vedantam
- Edited by: Praveen Angre
- Music by: Songs: Rana Mazumder; Guest Composer: Akriti Kakkar; Score: Dharma Vish
- Production companies: Filmy Keeda Productions Pvt Ltd; Torque
- Distributed by: Zee Studios
- Release date: 15 March 2019
- Running time: 141 minutes
- Country: India
- Language: Hindi
- Box office: est.23.4 Crores (INR)

Milan Talkies is a 2019 Indian Hindi-language romantic drama film directed by Tigmanshu Dhulia. Written by Dhulia, Kamal Pandey and Abhishek Mazumdar, the film stars Ali Fazal, Shraddha Srinath (her Hindi debut), Ashutosh Rana, Sanjay Mishra, Reecha Sinha and Sikandar Kher, with its plot revolving around a struggling film director, who wants to become the biggest filmmaker in India. It is the story how his life revolves around movies and how he falls in love in filmy style. It was released on 15 March 2019.

== Plot ==
An aspiring filmmaker and his lady-love find themselves in a fix after being met with violent opposition from the girl's family members.

== Cast ==
- Ali Fazal as Annu
- Shraddha Srinath as Maithali a.k.a. Janak Kumari
- Tigmanshu Dhulia as Annu's Father
- Ashutosh Rana as Janardhan Panda
- Reecha Sinha as Babli
- Sanjay Mishra as Usman Bhai
- Sikandar Kher as Guru Panda
- R. J. Alok as DOP
- Jay Patel as Mahendra Singh
- Monazir Khan as Shailendra

== Soundtrack ==
Milan Talkies

Soundtrack album by Rana Mazumder and Akriti Kakar
- Released: 5 March 2019
- Recorded: 2017–18
- Genre: Feature Film Soundtrack
- Length: 26:06
- Label: Zee Music Company

Official audio
- Official Audio Jukebox on YouTube

Rana Mazumder chronology
Saheb, Biwi Aur Gangster 3 (2018)	Milan Talkies (2019)

The music of the film was composed by Rana Mazumder with lyrics by Amitabh Bhattacharya, while Akriti Kakar wrote the song "Jobless" as a guest composer, singing it with her sisters Prakriti Kakar and Sukriti Kakar. Soundism did the recordings and music production for the song "Shart".

Track listing
No.	Title	Singer(s)	Length
1.	"Bakaiti"	Sukhwinder Singh, Benny Dayal	4:40
2.	"Mind Na Kariyo Holi Hai"	Mika Singh, Shreya Ghoshal	4:46
3.	"Shart"	Sonu Nigam	4:58
4.	"Jobless" (Lyrics and Music: Akriti Kakkar)	Akriti Kakar, Sukriti Kakar, Prakriti Kakar	2:50
5.	"Shart" (Reprise)	Neha Karode	3:13
6.	"Din Dahade"	Neeraj Shridhar, Shaan, Rana Mazumder	4:39
Total length:			26:06

== Reception ==
=== Critical response ===
Shailajit Mitra from The New Indian Express wrote "That also sums up, sadly, the fate of Tigmanshu Dhulia’s recent works. Like his hero, he is a director who would rather act". A reviewer of Hindustan Times says "Ali Fazal, Shraddha, Ashutosh and Sanjay are particularly delightful. There are a few road bumps though – the film’s length and entirely forgettable music". Sukanya Verma from Rediff.com wrote "Their spontaneity for this muddled script is commendable, but not enough to suffer yet another case of repentant fathers and couples on a train to happily-ever after".
