= Fixerr =

2019 Indian Hindi action drama web series

- Official card
- Genre: Action; Drama
- Created by: Sakett Saawhney
- Developed by: Ekta Kapoor
- Written by: Dialogues; Ajaydeep Singh
- Screenplay by: Adhir Bhat; Ankush Salaria; Baljit Singh Chaddha
- Story by: Sakett Saawhney
- Directed by: Soham Shah; Ankush Bhatt
- Creative directors: Baljit Singh Chaddha; Sonali Singh
- Starring: Shabir Ahluwalia
- Theme music composer: Swastik - Sagnik
- Opening theme: Jam8 by Neha Tomar
- Composer: Raju Singh
- Country of origin: India
- Original language: Hindi
- No. of seasons: 1
- No. of episodes: 12 (list of episodes)

Production
- Executive producers: Aakash Berry; Insiya Burmawala
- Producer: Riti Sawnhney
- Editors: Vikas Sharma; Vishal Sharma; Birenjyoti Mohanty
- Camera setup: Multi-camera
- Running time: 18-28 minutes
- Production company: Ekomkar Pictures Pvt LTD.

Original release
- Network: ALT Balaji; ZEE5
- Release: 7 October 2019

Fixerr is a 2019 Indian web series created by Sakett Saawhney and produced by Riti Sawnhney under her banner Ekomkar Pictures for ALT Balaji, It is also available on ZEE5. The series marks the Web debut of actor Shabir Ahluwalia and stars Mahie Gill, Karishma Sharma, Tigmanshu Dhulia and Varun Badola in supporting roles. It was made available on ALTBalaji and ZEE5 platform on 7 October 2019.

== Plot ==
The series revolves around Inspector Jaiveer Maalik who is accused of killing a gangster's wife during encounter and is suspended for the same. The series explores how Maalik, after his suspension takes his own route to punish the criminals by fixing with their enemies to kill them.

== Cast ==
- Shabir Ahluwalia as Jaiveer Maalik
- Isha Koppikar as Jayanti Jaydev
- Mahie Gill as Kesar Maalik
- Karishma Sharma as Aahana Khurrana
- Tigmanshu Dhulia as Yashpal Sherawat
- Varun Badola as Digvijay Dalmia
- Gagan Anand as Tarun Dalmia
- Mukesh Chhabra as Agantuk
- Amit Gaur as Karim Mirza
- Ravi Kesar as Shiv Pratap Singh
- Anshuman Malhotra as Arjun Maalik
- Rajat Rawail as Vicky Kapoor
- Rakhi Sawant as herself (cameo)
- Parree Pande as Airhostess

== Episodes ==
No. overall	No. in season	Title	Directed by	Written by	Original release date
1	1	"Twinkle Twinkle Little Star, Kaminey Nikle Sab Mere Yaar"	Soham and Ankush Bhatt	Ajaydeep Singh	7 October 2019
2	2	"Mumbai Mujhe Raas Aane Wali Thi"	Soham and Ankush Bhatt	Ajaydeep Singh	7 October 2019
3	3	"Pappu So Gaya"	Soham and Ankush Bhatt	Ajaydeep Singh	7 October 2019
4	4	"Sexanjali"	Soham and Ankush Bhatt	Ajaydeep Singh	7 October 2019
5	5	"Baba ka Bawaal"	Soham and Ankush Bhatt	Ajaydeep Singh	7 October 2019
6	6	"Try-Sexual"	Soham and Ankush Bhatt	Ajaydeep Singh	7 October 2019
7	7	"Ek Teer se Do Nishane"	Soham and Ankush Bhatt	Ajaydeep Singh	7 October 2019
8	8	"Nayi Naveli Vidhva"	Soham and Ankush Bhatt	Ajaydeep Singh	7 October 2019
9	9	"Ghar ka Bhedi Lanka Khaye"	Soham and Ankush Bhatt	Ajaydeep Singh	7 October 2019
10	10	"Drug Di Maa ki Aankh"	Soham and Ankush Bhatt	Ajaydeep Singh	7 October 2019
11	11	"Meri Doston Ne Leli Waha, Jaha Tel Kam Tha"	Soham and Ankush Bhatt	Ajaydeep Singh	7 October 2019
12	12	"Pyaar Chahiye Ya Paisa Chahiye"	Soham and Ankush Bhatt	Ajaydeep Singh	7 October 2019
