= Anjjan Bhattacharya =

- Born: 1 June 1973 (age 53); Barasat, North 24 Parganas district, West Bengal
- Origin: India
- Genres: Film scores, Bollywood
- Occupations: Music director, composer

Anjjan Bhattacharya is an Indian composer, film score composer and singer. Bhattacharya was part of Meet Bros but parted ways in 2017.

== Bollywood discography ==
=== As Meet Bros Anjjan (2010-2015, 2020, 2023-2024) ===
Year	Film	Track(s)
2010	Isi Life Mein	All Songs (Debut film)
2010	Do Dooni Chaar	"Baaja Bajya" "Ek Haath De"
2011	Yeh Dooriyan	"Baat Jo Thi" "Lets Rock Sarasarahat"
2012	Paan Singh Tomar	"Kero Mama"
2012	Kyaa Super Kool Hain Hum	"Shirt Da Button"^{1} "Hum Toh Hain Cappucino" "Volume High Karle"^{2} "Shirt Da Button Version 2"
2012	OMG – Oh My God!	"Mere Nishaan" "Krishna Theme (Flute)"
2013	Shootout at Wadala	"Goli" "Aye Manya"
2013	Warning 3D	"Bebasi"
2013	Policegiri	"Robinhood"
2013	Zanjeer	"Pinky" "Katilana"^{2} "Khoche Pathan Ki Jubaan Qawaali"
2013	Satyagraha	"Janta Rocks"
2013	Boss	"Boss" (Along with Yo Yo Honey Singh)^{2} "Pitah Se Hai Naam Tera" "Boss Entry - Theme"
2014	Ragini MMS 2	"Baby Doll"^{2}
2014	Bhoothnath Returns	"Party Toh Banti Hai" (Along with Palash Muchhal)
2014	Hate Story 2	"Pink Lips"^{2}
2014	Kick	"Hangover"^{1} ^{2} "Hai Yehi Zindagi"^{1} "Hai Yehi Zindagi Version 2" "Hai Yehi Zindagi Version 3"
2014	Singham Returns	"Singham Returns Theme"^{2}
2014	Kkoli: A Journey of Love	"Elitin Beletin" "Jodi Chao"^{1} "Tumi Acho"^{2} "Jodi Chao (Reprise)"
2015	Sharafat Gayi Tel Lene	"Selfiyaan"
2015	Baby	"Beparwah"
2015	Roy	"Chittiyaan Kalaiyaan"
2015	Ek Paheli Leela	"Glamorous Ankhiyaan" "Dhol Baaje" "Main Hoon Deewana Tera"
2015	Calendar Girls	"Awesome Mora Mahiya" "We Will Rock The World"
2015	Dharam Sankat Mein	"Tu Takke"
2020	Shimla Mirchi	"Sau Galtiyaan" "Ishq Di Feeling" "Mirchi Shimle Di" (Last collaboration, late release)
2023	Satyaprem Ki Katha	"Gujju Pataka" (Collaboration after 8 years)
2024	Love Sex Aur Dhokha 2	"Gulabi Ankhiyan"

^{1} A different version of this song is included in the soundtrack.
^{2} One or more remixed version of this song is included in the soundtrack.

=== As Anjjan Bhattacharya (2016-present) ===
Year	Film	Track(s)
2016	Ishq Junoon	"Sirf Tu...."
2017	Shrestha Bangali	"Chaap Nishna"
2018	Saheb, Biwi Aur Gangster 3	"Kesariya Jugni"

== Awards and nominations ==
=== As Meet Bros Anjjan ===
Year	Award	Category	Nominated work	Result	Ref(s)
2015	7th Mirchi Music Awards	Best Song Producer (Programming & Arranging)	"Baby Doll" from Ragini MMS 2 (with Bharat Goel)	Won	
2016	61st Filmfare Awards	Best Music Director	Roy (with Amaal Mallik and Ankit Tiwari)	Won	
2016	6th GiMA Awards	Best Music Director	Roy (with Amaal Mallik and Ankit Tiwari)	Nominated	
2016	6th GiMA Awards	Best Film Album	Roy (with Amaal Mallik and Ankit Tiwari)	Won	
2016	17th IIFA Awards	Best Music	Roy (with Amaal Mallik and Ankit Tiwari)	Won	
2016	8th Mirchi Music Awards	Album of the Year	Roy (with Amaal Mallik and Ankit Tiwari)	Nominated	
2016	8th Mirchi Music Awards	Listeners' Choice Album of the Year	Roy (with Amaal Mallik and Ankit Tiwari)	Won	
2016	22nd Screen Awards	Best Music Director	Roy (with Amaal Mallik and Ankit Tiwari)	Won	
2016	11th Star Guild Awards	Best Music	Roy (with Amaal Mallik and Ankit Tiwari)	Won	
2016	Zee Cine Awards 2016	Best Music	Roy (with Amaal Mallik and Ankit Tiwari)	Nominated	
