= Mahaan Kanakku =

2011 Tamil film

- Film poster
- Directed by: Sampath Arumugam
- Written by: Sampath Arumugam
- Produced by: G. P. S.
- Starring: Ramana; Reecha Sinha
- Cinematography: Karthik
- Edited by: Suresh Urs
- Music by: A K Rishal Sai
- Production company: Pooja Film International
- Distributed by: Ayngaran International
- Release date: 30 December 2011
- Running time: 149 minutes
- Country: India
- Language: Tamil

Mahaan Kanakku (transl. Saint's calculations; formerly known as Gandhi Kanakku (Note: Gandhi Kanakku refers to a sum of money that a lender knows he will not be able to recover.)), is a 2011 Indian Tamil-language drama film directed by Sampath Arumugam, an assistant to Sasi. The film stars Ramana and Reecha Sinha in her debut. The music was composed by A. K. Rishal Sai. The film was released on 30 December 2011 to mixed reviews.

== Cast ==
- Ramana as Jeeva
- Reecha Sinha as Anjali
- Srinath as Professor Varadharajan
- Devadarshini as Janaki
- Saravana Subbiah as Auditor
- Sathish as Mandotharan, Jeeva's friend
- TSK as Jeeva's friend
- Lollu Sabha Jeeva as Gopi
- Manobala as Traffic Police Officer
- S. N. Lakshmi as Orphanage Caretaker
- A. Venkatesh as Math Teacher
- Suresh Urs as CEO Suresh
- Sabitha Anand
- Charmila
- Neethiyin Kural C. R. Bhaskaran as Jeeva's lawyer
- Karthik as Opposition Lawyer
- Neelu
- Muthukaalai
- Caroline Ritika as Janaki and Varadharajan's daughter
- Anna Hazare (archival footage)

== Production ==
The film began production under the title Gandhi Kanakku. The title was later changed to Mahaan Kanakku after a case was filed against the name, as the title demeaned Mohandas Karamchand Gandhi. Editor Suresh Urs forayed into acting through this film.

== Release and reception ==
A critic from Maalai Malar wrote that "Borrowing lakhs of lakhs from beggars is an interesting activity. It is a trademark to hold revenge films with a smile on the face of a hurt heart. For the eyes bored of love stories, the social problem was portrayed in a compelling screen story".

Devadarshini won the Norway Tamil Film Festival Award for Best Supporting Actress.
