= Emotional Atyachar =

- Created by: Abhimanyu Singh
- Presented by: Pravesh Rana
- Country of origin: India
- No. of seasons: 5

Production
- Running time: ~43 minutes
- Production companies: UTV Television (season 1–3); Contiloe Entertainment (season 4)

Original release
- Network: Bindass
- Release: 18 December 2009 – 10 September 2015

Emotional Atyachar is an Indian television series which aired on Bindass. The name and the title song are taken from the film Dev.D.

Emotional Atyachar is a reality show in which a person who doubts their boyfriend's/girlfriend's loyalty, can ask for a loyalty test on them. The person checking their partner's loyalty is referred to as the lead, while the person on whom the loyalty test is being performed is called the suspect. The crew members follow them and also ask another person to act as if they are intimate with them. These are caught on camera and shown to the lead.

The first season was hosted by Angad Bedi, where as season 2 to 5 were hosted by Pravesh Rana.

Emotional Atyachar was produced by UTV Television with inputs from Creative Director and writer Roshni Ghosh.

A Public Interest Litigation (PIL) was filed, in 2011, by Indraprashtha People, an NGO, through its President Sanjay Tiwari Ujala. He said "through this programme, the TV channel has been hurting the feeling of viewers, spreading vulgarity and demoting social and moral values in our society".

The Law commission, floated a discussion paper, saying "In the recent past, instances of Television channels exceeding the limits of decency by using sting operation (hidden camera) as a tool in ongoing reality shows to expose infidelity of a spouse, boyfriend, etc have been noticed," the commission noted in its discussion paper. "Such sting operations, showing the private life of common men and women, are not conducted for exposing public wrongs and do not serve any public interest or public purpose. They are violating the right to privacy and taking civilization backward," it added.
