= Bullett Raja =

2013 Indian film by Tigmanshu Dhulia

Bullet Raja
- Theatrical release poster
- Directed by: Tigmanshu Dhulia
- Written by: Tigmanshu Dhulia; Amaresh Misra
- Produced by: Rahul Mittra; Nitin Tej Ahuja; Tigmanshu Dhulia
- Starring: Saif Ali Khan; Jimmy Sheirgill; Vidyut Jammwal; Sonakshi Sinha; Chunky Pandey; Ravi Kishan; Vishwajeet Pradhan; Gulshan Grover; Raj Babbar
- Cinematography: P. S. Vinod
- Edited by: Rahul Srivastava
- Music by: Sajid–Wajid; Guest Composer: RDB
- Production companies: BrandSmith Motion Pictures; Moving Pictures; Rahul Mittra Films
- Distributed by: Fox Star Studios
- Release date: 29 November 2013
- Country: India
- Language: Hindi
- Budget: ₹51 crore
- Box office: ₹53.60 crore

Bullett Raja (transl. Bullet King) is a 2013 Indian Hindi-language action film directed by Tigmanshu Dhulia and produced by Rahul Mittra, Nitin Tej Ahuja and Tigmanshu Dhulia under the banner of BrandSmith Motion Pictures, Rahul Mittra Films and Moving Pictures. The film features Saif Ali Khan and Sonakshi Sinha in the lead roles, while Jimmy Sheirgill, Vidyut Jammwal, Chunky Pandey, Ravi Kishan, Vishwajeet Pradhan, Gulshan Grover and Raj Babbar appear in supporting roles.

The film is set against the backdrop of Uttar Pradesh-based mafia while dealing with the political and industrial powers of the state.

Bullett Raja was the opening film at the 8th annual Mosaic International South Asian Film Festival (MISAFF) 2014 in Toronto and was released on 29 November 2013.

== Plot ==
Raja Mishra gatecrashes into a wedding while trying to escape from a brawl. The bride's cousin, Rudra Tripathi, and Raja form a friendship, with Raja revealing that he is an uninvited guest. While in the process of seducing the mujra dancer, Raja overhears a plot by Lallan Tiwari to execute everyone in the wedding upon instructions from Akhand Vir wanting to use Rudra's uncle's land for poppy farming. Raja warns everyone about the impending attack, and Raja and Rudra fight off the attacking Lallan Tiwari's gang. Rudra's uncle sees the potential in Raja Mishra and Rudra Tripathi forming an alliance for offering protection to political personalities and offers them to join his gang. Not wanting to enter the world of politics, they refuse, and Rudra's uncle advises them to take refuge from Lallan's gang in jail. In a later incident, Rudra's uncle is killed by the Akhand Vir with the help of Lallan Singh.

In jail, Raja and Rudra meet Shirivastav Ji, a political advisor with knowledge of everything happening in Uttar Pradesh politics. He arranges for Raja and Rudra to leave jail and avenge the death of Rudra's uncle by killing Lallan. Their success creates news in political circles, and Shirivastav advises them to join hands with Ram Babu Shukla in order to take revenge against the Akhand Vir.

They start working for Ram Babu Shukla, a politician, and in the process kill the Akhand Vir, gaining credibility and support in the political circles, which brings them fortune and fame amongst youth. Their friendship and partnership are the talk of the town, rendering the otherwise preferred hitman Sumer Yadav useless.

While representing Shukla in an important business meeting, Raja and Rudra are insulted by Balraj Bajaj. In order to teach him a lesson, they kidnap Bajaj while he is in the process of pretend interviewing a girl named Mitali for the role of an actress. They extort money from Bajaj, and in the process, Raja starts developing feelings for Mitali. On Shukla's advice, Raja, Rudra and Mitali go to Mumbai until matters settle. Raja proposes to Mitali, and Rudra approves of their relationship. Upon their return home, while Raja is out for work, Bajaj arrives with Sumer Yadav, who shoots Rudra dead in Mitali's presence.

Vowing to avenge Rudra's death, Raja retaliates by assassinating Bajaj, which turns all of the political and business fraternity against him. They all want him dead in order to gain Bajaj's money, which is needed to fund their election campaigns, but is being held by Shirivastav. They plot to kill him by appointing a police officer from Chambal, Arun Singh Munna. Raja meanwhile moves to Kolkata with Mitali, where their romance furthers. Upon returning from Kolkata, Raja finds Sumer Yadav and kills him in front of Arun, and in the following fight, he spares Arun's life. A mole in Raja's gang, ordered by Shukla, plots to kill Raja. According to the plan, Arun will kill Raja, but then the mole will kill Arun to appease the youth that supports Raja. Raja finds out about the plan and reveals it to Arun. Together, they kill the mole and fake Raja's death. In the end, Raja is shown leaving with Mitali for a new life, and Arun is also shown to be leaving with them.

== Cast ==
- Saif Ali Khan as Raja Mishra
- Sonakshi Sinha as Mitali
- Jimmy Sheirgill as Rudra Tripathi
- Vidyut Jammwal as SP Arun Singh Munna IPS
- Chunky Pandey as Lallan Tiwari
- Ravi Kishan as Sumer Yadav
- Vishwajeet Pradhan as Akhand Vir
- Gulshan Grover as Balraj Bajaj
- Raj Babbar as Minister Ram Babu Shukla
- Sharat Saxena as Rudra's uncle
- Vipin Sharma as Shirivastav Ji - Political Advisor
- Deepraj Rana as Commissioner
- Gaurav Dixit as actor
- Gaurav K. Jha as Mithilesh Don
- Dulal Lahiri as Mithali's father
- Rita Dutta Chakraborty as Mitali's mother
- Sudip Mukherjee as Goon
- Mahi Gill in an item number Don't Touch My Body
- Sachin Thakre as Emraan Hashmi

== Production ==
=== Development ===
The film's proposed name was Jai Ram Ji Ki but on the suggestion of Saif Ali Khan to producer Rahul Mittra it was named Bullett Raja to give it a more gangster feel. Sonakshi Sinha expressed excitement about working with Saif Ali Khan and called it a fresh pairing and joined the crew in February 2013. All male characters have grown a moustache to fit the role in the film. Earlier, actor Irrfan Khan was revealed to be a part of the film but he walked out because of hectic schedule and date clashes for his other projects. Later, producer Rahul Mittra replaced him with martial artist turned actor Vidyut Jamwal. Jamwal decided to design his stunts himself and without any body double. Later, Gulshan Grover was hired to play a negative role as a powerful industrialist in the film. The first teaser of Soha Ali Khan's starrer film Mr Joe B. Carvalho and trailer of Dedh Ishqiya were attached with Bullet Raja.

=== Filming ===
On 6 November 2012, the shooting of the film began in Lucknow, Raebareli, Kolkata and Mumbai were the other cities for filming later. The first leg of shooting came to an end in Lucknow on 10 December making it the first Bollywood film & producer Rahul Mittra the first film-maker to qualify for the film subsidy from Film Bandhu Uttar Pradesh while the second leg began at Kolkata at around last week of February 2013. Both real and fake guns are used during shooting while Saif used real guns for realistic look. The actors shot in the Dalhousie area of central Kolkata and other locations such as Princep Ghat, Kumartuli, flower market and the famous Laha Bari. After completion of schedule in Kolkata, the crew turned back to Lucknow to resume and then to Nashik for the final leg of the shooting.

== Release ==
The film was released on 28 November 2013 in the USA and on 29 November in India.

=== Critical reception ===
On review aggregation website Rotten Tomatoes, 33% of 6 reported critics gave the film a positive review, with an average rating of 6/10.

Faheem Ruhani of India Today gave 3.5 out of 5 stars to the film and said, "Bullet Raja's slogan claims 'aayenge toh garmi badyaenge.' To the film's credit, it delivers what it promises." Sarita A Tanwar of Daily News and Analysis gave 3 of 5 stars to the film and said, "Watch it if you’re a fan of some edgy dialogues. As for the rest of it, you’ll want to rain bullets on this Raja".

=== Pre-release business ===
The worldwide distribution rights were sold for ₹90 crore (US$9.3 million) to Fox Star studios. Its satellite rights were sold for ₹40 crore (US$4.2 million).

=== Box office ===
Bullet Raja opened below average mark at the box office as it grossed around ₹65 million (US$670,000) on its opening day and ₹65 million (US$670,000) the second day. On the third day, it collected about ₹75 million (US$780,000) bringing up the total first weekend to ₹213 million (US$2.2 million) at the box office. The film grossed ₹303 million (US$3.1 million) in its first week. In overseas markets, Bullett Raja grossed $1.25 million in ten days.

== Soundtrack ==
Bullett Raja

Soundtrack album by Sajid–Wajid RDB
- Released: 25 October 2013
- Recorded: Geet Audio Craft Studio; Ashok Honda Studio
- Genre: Soundtrack
- Length: 30:38
- Label: T-Series
- Producers: Sajid–Wajid, RDB

Sajid–Wajid chronology
Ishkq in Paris (2013)	Bullett Raja (2013)	Heropanti (2014)

RDB chronology
Bajatey Raho (2013)	Bullett Raja (2013)

The soundtrack album was released on 25 October 2013 on iTunes consisting of 7 tracks composed by RDB and Sajid–Wajid and lyrics written by Sandeep Nath, Kausar Munir, Shabbir Ahmed and Raftaar.

Track listing
No.	Title	Lyrics	Music	Singer(s)	Length
1.	"Tamanche Pe Disco"	Raftaar	RDB	RDB, Nindy Kaur & Raftaar	3:28
2.	"Saamne Hai Savera"	Kausar Munir	Sajid–Wajid	Wajid, Bonnie Chakraborty, Shreya Ghoshal	4:36
3.	"Jai Govinda Jai Gopala"	Shabbir Ahmed	Sajid–Wajid	Neeraj Shridhar	4:50
4.	"Don't Touch My Body"	Sandeep Nath	Sajid–Wajid	Mamta Sharma	4:48
5.	"Bullett Raja"	Kausar Munir	Sajid–Wajid	Wajid, Keerthi Sagathia	4:26
6.	"Satake Thoko"	Sandeep Nath	Sajid–Wajid	Wajid, Keerthi Sagathia, Danish Sabri	5:03
7.	"Jai Govinda Jai Gopala (Remix)"	Shabbir Ahmed	Sajid–Wajid	Neeraj Shridhar	3:27
Total length:					30:38
