= Deepraj Rana =

Indian actor

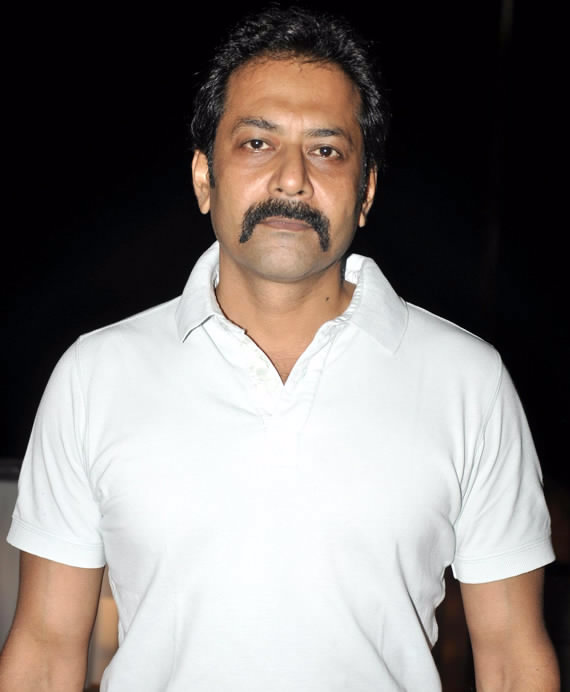
- Deepraj Rana in 2012
- Occupation: Actor
- Years active: 1990–present
- Website: deeprajrana.me

Deepraj Rana (also Deepraz Rana or Deep Raj Rana) is an Indian film and television actor.

== Early life ==
He was born and brought up in Prayagraj. Now he lives in Mumbai. He is married to TV actress Natasha Rana known for the role of Chhoti Maa in the television series Sapna Babul Ka...Bidaai. Deepraj Rana belongs to the lineage of Jung Bahadur Rana.

== Career ==
He has been working for over two decades and his major roles include those in the serial Reporter and in the film Mangal Pandey: The Rising.

== Filmography ==
=== Television ===
Year(s)	Show	Role
1988–1989	Bharat Ek Khoj	Miya Hussain
1989–1991	Udaan	Hariya
1990	Chanakya	
1990–1991	The Sword of Tipu Sultan	
1993–1997	Tara	Prithvi
1994	The Great Maratha	Jankoji Rao Scindia
1994–1996	Chandrakanta	
1996–1998	Yug	Deva
1997–2000	Jai Hanuman	Vibhishana
2006–2007	Left Right Left	Major Prabhat Nair
2009–2012	Na Aana Is Des Laado	Dm Vohra
2014–2015	Pukaar	A.C.P Dilawar Rana
2011–2014	Devon Ke Dev Mahadev	Parshuram
2016	Diya Aur Baati Hum	Gul Mohammad
2018	Chandrashekhar	Sridhal Daku
2019	Bhoot Purva	Chaudhary
2019	Muskaan	Malik
2022	The Great Indian Murder	Prithvi
2024–2025	Megha Barsenge	Inspector KP Talwar/CP Talwar

=== Film ===
Year	Film	Role
2002	Saathiya	Inspector
2003	Aanch	Shiva, Vidya's brother
2003	The Hero: Love Story of a Spy	RAW official
2004	Ek Hasina Thi	Krishna Verghese
2004	Police Force: An Inside Story	Rana
2005	Mangal Pandey: The Rising	Tatya Tope
2007	Red Swastik	Inspector Sunil
2011	Aarakshan	Sanjay Tandon
2011	Saheb, Biwi Aur Gangster	Kanahiya
2012	Ghost	Dr.Saxena
2012	The Victim	King
2012	Ckahravyuh	
2012	Parchaiyan	
2013	Special 26	Rahul
2013	Phata Poster Nikla Hero	Police Inspector Makhanna Bhattarcharya Lassi
2013	Saheb, Biwi Aur Gangster Returns	Kanahiya
2013	Enemmy	CID Informer Pakya Seth
2013	Loot	
2013	Bull BulBul Bandook	
2013	Machhli Jal Ki Rani Hai	Ugra Pratap Singh
2013	498A: The Wedding Gift	
2013	Bullett Raja	Commissioner
2014	Kohinoor	Mumbai Police
2014	Gunday	Dibakar
2014	Tera Mera Sath	
2014	Jaat - The Story of Revenge	Fufa
2014	Singham Returns	Sunil Prabhat
2014	Creature 3D	inspector Rana
2015	Prem Ratan Dhan Payo	Sanjay, Security-in-Charge of Pritampur Palace
2016	Ek Tera Saath	Police officer
2016	31st October	Pal
2017	Toofan Singh	CRPF officer Punjabi
2017	Kadamban	Mahendran
2018	Aiyaary	
2018	Saheb, Biwi Aur Gangster 3	Kanhaiya
2019	Milan Talkies	Kaptan Singh
2019	Dabangg 3	Surya
2020	Nikamma	
2022	No Means No	Stallone
2022	The Good Maharaja	Kishan
2022	Anth The End	
2023	A Winter Tale at Shimla	Uday Raj Singh
2025	Metro In Dino	Feroz Ansari
2026	Do Deewane Seher Mein	Deepak Sharma
