= Sanjay Chauhan (screenwriter) =

Indian screenwriter in Hindi films (1962–2023)

- Born: 1962; Bhopal, Madhya Pradesh, India
- Died: 12 January 2023 (aged 62); Mumbai, Maharashtra, India
- Occupations: Screenwriter & actor

Sanjay Chauhan (1962 – 12 January 2023) was an Indian screenwriter & actor in Hindi cinema, most known for I Am Kalam (2011) for which he won the Filmfare Award for Best Story., and Paan Singh Tomar (2012), which he co-wrote with Tigmanshu Dhulia

== Biography ==
Born and brought up into a Rajput family in Bhopal, where his father worked for the Indian Railways, while his mother was a school teacher, Chauhan started his career as a journalist in Delhi, before moving to Mumbai after he wrote crime TV series, Bhanwar for Sony TV in late 1990s.

Chauhan died of liver disease on 12 January 2023, at the age of 60.

== Filmography ==
- Hazaaron Khwaishein Aisi (2003) (Dialogue)
- Dhoop (2003) (Dialogue)
- Siskiyaan (2005) (Screenplay)
- Say Salaam India (2007) (Dialogue)
- Maine Gandhi Ko Nahin Mara (2005) (Screenplay & Dialogue)
- Right Yaaa Wrong (2010) (Dialogue)
- I Am Kalam (2011) (Story, actor and Dialogue)
- Saheb, Biwi Aur Gangster (2011) (Story & Screenplay)
- Paan Singh Tomar (2012) (Story & Screenplay)
- Saheb, Biwi Aur Gangster Returns (2013) (Story & Screenplay)
