= Shrestha Bangali =

2017 film by Swapan Saha

- Poster
- Directed by: Swapan Saha
- Story by: Shaktipada Rajguru
- Starring: Rajpal Yadav; Ulka Gupta; Laboni Sarkar; Shakti Kapoor
- Music by: Anjjan Bhattacharya, Monty Sharma
- Release date: 22 September 2017
- Country: India
- Language: Bengali

Shrestha Bangali is a 2017 Indian Bengali language dramedy film based on a novel by Shaktipada Rajguru, directed by Swapan Saha and starring Ulka Gupta, Laboni Sarkar, Rajpal Yadav, Shakti Kapoor and Rajatabha Dutta in important roles.

== Plot ==
This film is about the inhabitants of Chitmahal, a land near the Indo-Bangladesh border, neglected by the government. Kesto Master (Rajpal Yadav) who lives in the village tries to better their plight. How he does it is the rest of the story.

== Cast ==
- Ulka Gupta
- Laboni Sarkar
- Shakti Kapoor
- Kaushik Banerjee
- Sumit Ganguly
- Rajatabha Dutta
- Rajpal Yadav
- Sunny Leone as item girl in song "Chaap Nishna"

== Soundtrack ==
The music was composed by Monty Sharma, Anjjan Bhattacharya, Sanjeev-Darshan and released by Zee Music Company.

Shrestha Bangali

Soundtrack album by Monty Sharma, Anjjan Bhattacharya, Sanjeev-Darshan
- Released: 1 September 2017
- Recorded: 2017
- Genre: Soundtrack
- Length: 16:59
- Label: Zee Music Company
- Producer: Monty Sharma, Anjjan Bhattacharya, Sanjeev-Darshan

Track list
No.	Title	Lyrics	Music	Singer(s)	Length
1.	"Dhinka Chikaa"	Lipi	Sanjeev-Darshan	Akriti Kakar, Nakash Aziz	3:19
2.	"Ichhe Dana"	Priyo Chatterjee	Monty Sharma	Armaan Malik, Palak Muchhal	4:05
3.	"Jibon Ei Circus A"	Lipi	Monty Sharma	Shaan	3:08
4.	"Dishey Hara Mon"	Lipi	Monty Sharma	Armaan Malik	3:42
5.	"Chaap Nishna"	Lipi	Anjjan Bhattacharya	Mamta Sharma, Dev Negi	2:45
Total length:					16:59

== Critical reception ==
The film is panned by critics for its weak script and so hilarious performance by the entire cast.

== Release ==
The film was released on 22 September 2017.
