= Pravessh Rana =

Indian actor, television host and model

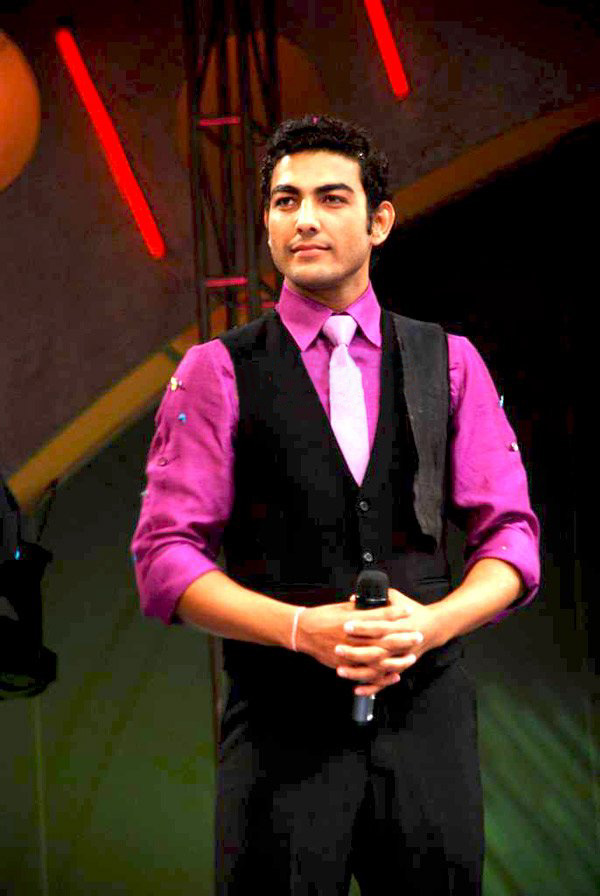
- Born: Pravessh Rana; 26 February 1983 (age 43); Baraut, Uttar Pradesh, India
- Education: Delhi University
- Occupations: Actor; television host; model
- Years active: 2008–present
- Honours: Mr. India (2008)
- Website: Official Website

Pravessh Rana (born 26 February 1983) is an Indian actor, television host, and model. He is most known for having won the Mr. India title in 2008. Rana participated in the reality television show Bigg Boss and has hosted the reality show Emotional Atyachar, as well as award shows such as the Screen Awards, and Indian Television Awards. He made his film debut in Saheb, Biwi Aur Gangster Returns (2013), earning a nomination for Best Male Debut at the 2014 Apsara Awards.

He starred in the British television serial The Serpent (2021) and the American television series Foundation (2021).

== Early life and education ==
Rana was born in Baraut, Uttar Pradesh, India. He completed his schooling from St. Mary's Academy, Meerut, after which he completed Bachelor of Economics at the Ramjas College, Delhi University. He completed his Master of Fine Arts from the London Academy of Music and Dramatic Art.

== Career ==
He won the title of Mr India in 2008. Rana has hosted for television channels such as Zoom, STAR Plus, The Walt Disney Company and Colors and various seasons of Emotional Atyachar. He was also the runner-up for the third season of the reality show Bigg Boss.

== Filmography ==
Key
†	Denotes films that have not yet been released

=== Film ===
Year	Title	Role	Notes
2013	Saheb, Biwi Aur Gangster Returns	Parambir Singh	
2016	San' 75 Pachattar	Prakash	
2020	London Confidential	Azaad	
2021	Radhe	Heera Lal	
2022	Ram Setu	Project Manager Bali	
2025	Deva	Farhan Khan	
2026	Dial 1975	Prakash	

=== Television ===
Year	Title	Role	Notes
2009	Bigg Boss	Contestant	Runner-up
2010-2013	Emotional Atyachar	Host	
2021	The Serpent	Thapa	British television series
2021	Foundation	Rowan	American television series
2023	Garmi	Dicky Singh	

== Awards and nominations ==
Year	Award Show	Award	Film	Result
2014	Apsara Awards	Best Male Debut	Saheb, Biwi Aur Gangster Returns	Nominated
