= Vipin Sharma =

Indian film actor

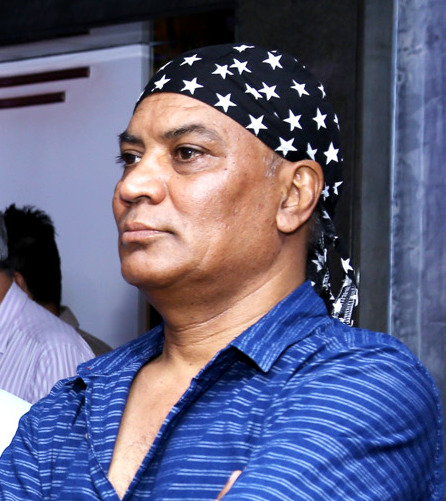
- Sharma in 2016
- Born: Delhi, India
- Occupations: Actor; editor; filmmaker
- Years active: 1989–present

Vipin Kumar Sharma is an Indian actor, editor and filmmaker. He is best known for his acting roles in Taare Zameen Par, Gangs of Wasseypur, Kick, Paatal Lok and Monkey Man.

== Early life ==
Sharma spent his early childhood in a slum in Delhi. Though he was interested in acting in films from his early days, it was theater that inspired him initially, especially after he happened to listen to Sanjeev Kumar's interview on radio. He joined a small Punjabi theater group to perform various odd jobs in Delhi, e.g. selling tickets or serving tea.

He is an alumnus of National School of Drama, New Delhi, India and the Canadian Film Centre in Toronto, Ontario, Canada. He graduated from the National School of Drama, India in 2003.

== Career ==
Sharma made his acting debut with Doordarshan's television series Bharat Ek Khoj in 1989, followed by his feature film debut Krishna in 1996, he gained attention for his portrayal of Nandakishore Awasthi in Aamir Khan's Taare Zameen Par in 2007. He was later nominated for his first ever Screen Award for Best Actor in a Supporting Role for Taare Zameen Par, but eventually lost to his co-star Aamir Khan.

Following the success of Taare Zameen Par, Sharma played the servant Balvant in the horror film 1920, the title character's landlord in the psychological thriller film Karthik Calling Karthik, Gaindha Singh in the romantic thriller film Saheb, Biwi Aur Gangster, Major Masand in the biographical drama film Paan Singh Tomar, Ehsaan Qureshi in the critically acclaimed crime action film Gangs of Wasseypur, and Dilip in the Indian-Australian-American co-production, Hotel Mumbai. Sharma met Dev Patel on the set of Hotel Mumbai and stayed in touch with the film's producer who called him for an audition with Patel for Monkey Man. He played the leader of a hijra community in the film which was released in 2024.

Since 2020, he has starred in the Amazon's series Paatal Lok as DCP Bhagat.

== Filmography ==
Key
†	Denotes films that have not yet been released

=== Films ===
Year	Film	Role	Notes
1996	Krishna	Panditji	
2007	Taare Zameen Par	Nandkishore Awasthi	
2008	1920	Balwanth, the caretaker	
2008	Jannat	Kedernath Dixit, Arjun's father	
2010	Karthik Calling Karthik	landlord	
2011	Yeh Saali Zindagi	Shyam Singhania	
2011	Saheb Biwi aur Gangster	Gaindha Singh	
2012	Paan Singh Tomar	Major Masand	
2012	Luv Shuv Tey Chicken Khurana	Kehar Singh	
2012	Gangs of Wasseypur	Ehsaan Qureshi	
2013	Inkaar	Gupta	
2013	Special 26	ACP / Constable (fake)	
2013	Raanjhanaa	Shivraman Shankar	
2013	Satyagraha	Gauri Shankar	
2013	John Day	Inspector Mangesh Shinde	
2013	Kirchiyaan	Bittu	Short film
2013	Shahid	Prosecutor More	
2013	Bullet Raja	Shirivastav Ji	
2014	Kick	Home Minister Pradeep Gajra	
2014	Akki Te Vikki Te Nikki		Directorial debut
2015	Main Aur Charles	Satender Kumar	
2016	Raman Raghav 2.0	Raghavan's father	
2016	The Blueberry Hunt		
2017	Kaatru Veliyidai	Prakash Abraham, Dr. Leela's father	Tamil film
2017	Shaadi Mein Zaroor Aana	Mahesh Kumar	
2018	Baaghi 2	Mahendra Rawat	
2018	Hotel Mumbai	Dilip	
2018	Simmba	Corporator David Cameron	
2019	Cabaret	Police Inspector	
2019	The Accidental Prime Minister	Ahmed Patel	
2019	Bebaak		
2019	Gone Kesh	A.Dasgupta, Enakshi's father	
2019	Moothon	Orphanage Warden	
2020	Khuda Haafiz	Nadeem	
2020	Ateet	Dr. Masood	
2021	Dybbuk		
2023	Sirf Ek Bandaa Kaafi Hai	Adv. Pramod Sharma	
2023	Haddi	Bibek Mitra	
2024	Monkey Man	Alpha	American film
2024	Bhaiyya Ji	SI Magan	
2025	The Sadist		Short film
2025	Dhadak 2	Neelesh's father	
TBA	The Big Fix †		Filming

=== Television ===
Year	Title	Role
1988	Bharat Ek Khoj	Ramkrishna Paramhansa
2017	What The Folks	Prakash Sharma
2019	The Final Call	ATS Chief Kale
2020	Mastram	Durga Prasad
2020	Paatal Lok	DCP Bhagat
2020–present	The Family Man	Sambit
2023	Guns & Gulaabs	Mahendra
2023	P I Meena	Tridib Malhotra
2025	Crime Beat	S K Rawat
2025	Maharani	PM Sudhakar Sriniwas Joshi
