= Mukhtar Sahota =

British Punjabi music composer and producer

- Born: Mukhtar Sahota; Wolverhampton, United Kingdom
- Genres: Bhangra, Fusion, Reggae, Rock, Rap
- Occupations: Music composer, record producer
- Years active: 1987–present
- Label: Internalmusic
- Website: www.mukhtarsahota.com

Mukhtar Sahota is a British Punjabi music composer and producer, associated with the group Sahotas.

After the 2004 tsunami in Asia and the 2005 Kashmir earthquake, Sahota produced the charity single "We Can Make it Better". A R Rahman arranged the strings.

Sahota releases his music via his own label, Internalmusic.

Sahota has produced songs for a number of Bollywood films.

== Albums produced by Mukhtar Sahota for Sahotas ==
Year	Title	Record label	Ref.
1986	Urdas Karde Ha	Multitone Records	
1987	Giddha Pao	Multitone Records	
1988	Sahota Beat	Multitone Records	
1989	Aaja	Multitone Records	
1990	Are You Feeling	Rough Trade	
1990	Ishk	Multitone Records	
1994	Hass Hogia	IRS Records/EMI	
1994	Out of Reach	IRS Records/EMI	
1995	The Right Time	IRS Records/EMI	
1995	Suniye	Roma Music	
1997	Decade	Kamlee Records	
1997	Maa Da Pyar	Kamlee Records	
1999	Brotherhood	Envy	
2001	Revolution	Envy	

== Solo albums & singles produced by Mukhtar Sahota ==
Year	Title	Record label	Ref.
2002	"Time Out (Album)" Feat. Lehmber Hussainpuri, Feroz Khan, Amar Arshi & Various Artists	Internalmusic	
2004	"4 The Muzik" Feat. Various Artists	Internalmusic	
2005	"Donasian" - We Can Make it Better Feat. Various Artists	Internalmusic	
2006	"21st Century Jugni" - Arif Lohar	Internalmusic	
2007	"Unpredictable" - Lakhwinder Wadali & Wadali Brothers	Internalmusic	
2011	"Khazana" - Harbhajan Shera	Internalmusic	
2016	"Ishq Yaar Da Lageya" - Baljit Wadali & Wadali Brothers	Internalmusic	
2017	"Dil Di Kitaab" - Surjit Khan	Headliner Records & Internalmusic	
2017	"Jhanjharan" - Surjit Khan	Headliner Records & Internalmusic	
2018	"Sazaa" - Surjit Khan	Headliner Records & Internalmusic	
2018	"Changa Bhala Munda" - Rai Saab	T-series	
2018	"Electro Mirza" - Honey Mirza	Internalmusic & Mate Melodies	
2018	"Khaab" - Manleen Rekhi	Internalmusic	
2019	"Faqeeriyaan" - A Collection of Punjabi Poetry - Shammi Jalandhari	Internalmusic	
2019	"Dhun" - Sanhita Majumder	Internalmusic	
2020	"Gallan Pyar Diyan" - Surjit Khan	Headliner Records & Internalmusic	
2020	"Love Song" - Sanhita Majumder	Internalmusic	
2020	"Koka Ishq Da" - Debi Makhsoospuri	Worldwide Records	
2020	"Jugni Mastqalandar" - Arif Lohar & Fozia Hassan	HSR Entertainment	
2020	"Kamla" - Guru Sidhu	T-series	
2021	"Ishq Mera Sultan" - A Collection of Punjabi Poems - Shammi Jalandhari	Internalmusic	
2022	"Ishq Ne Kamla" - JDeep	Internalmusic	
2024	"Dont Let Go" - Parmjit Kaur	Internalmusic	
2025	"Dil Dariya" - Lakhwinder Sabla, Nitin Kumar	Sabla Music	
2025	"Kaise Jiyoon (Female)" - Arshpreet Jugni	Internalmusic	
2025	"Kaise Jiyoon (Male)" - Nitin Kumar	Internalmusic	

== Films ==
Year	Film	Language	Songs	Ref.
2009	Blue (2009 film)	Hindi	Background Score (Punjabi rap, vocal, music and lyrics)	
2009	Dil Bole Hadippa	Hindi	"Ishq Hi Hai Rab " - Track Melody Composition	
2010	Raavan	Hindi	"Thok De Killi " - Sukhwinder Singh, Am'Nico	
2012	Diary of a Butterfly	Hindi	"Jugni " - Arif Lohar	
2012	Saheb, Biwi Aur Gangster	Hindi	"Akhian tho Phull " - Arif Lohar	
2012	Saheb, Biwi Aur Gangster Returns	Hindi	"Dukh Thor Ditte Jugni " - Harbhajan Shera	
2013	Heer and Hero	Punjabi	"Haule Haule " - Ranjit Rana	
2014	Jatt James Bond	Punjabi	"Rog Pyaar De " - Rahat Fateh Ali Khan, Sanam Marvi "Jis Tan Nu Lagdi " - Arif Lohar	
2016	Saka - The Martyrs of Nankana Sahib	Punjabi	"Shaheed " - Nachhatar Gill "Saka " - Kanth Kaler "Tappe " - Shipra Goyal, Sonia Sharma	
2018	Raja Abroadiya	Hindi	"Nazaare " - Nitin Kumar, Sanhita Majumder "Bheete Nahin Rehna (Female) " - Simar Kaur "Banke Saanse " - Sherry Khan, Sanhita Majumder "Bhame England " - Karan Juneja "Bheete Nahin Rehna (Male) " - Nitin Kumar	
2019	Ishq My Religion	Punjabi	"Ishq Dian Peeran " - Nooran Sisters "Kaleh Rang " - Arif Lohar, Sunidhi Chauhan "Chori Chori " - Sunidhi Chauhan, Sonu Nigam "Rangi Gaye (Female Version) " - Jyoti Nooran "Asool Vakhre " - Rahat Fateh Ali Khan "Laung Gawacha Reply " - Mika Singh, Sunidhi Chauhan "Dukhan Di Kahani " - Rahat Fateh Ali Khan "Rangi Gaye (Male Version)" - Mussarat Abbas "Rangi Gaye (Sad Version)" - Sultana Nooran	
2022	Saade Aale	Punjabi	"Yaar Vichre" - Amrinder Gill	
2023	Vash- Possessed by the Obsessed	Hindi	"Jaan Nasheen " - Mohammad Irfan Ali, Sanhita Majumder "Woh Tumhi Ho " - Yasser Desai, Palak Muchhal "Munde Sentimental " - Pawni Pandey, Priyankaa Bhattacharya(Rap) "Vash Title Track " - Shalmali Kholgade	

== Various musical projects ==
- Rock in the Temple - Collaboration with Des Sherwood
- Stage 3 - Ministry of Sound 2003 Compilation Album
- Ilahi - Religious Islamic Nasheed Album 2009 for Suhail Najmi
