= Saheb, Biwi Aur Gangster Returns =

2013 Indian film by Tigmanshu Dhulia

Saheb Biwi Aur Gangster Returns
- Theatrical Release Poster
- Directed by: Tigmanshu Dhulia
- Screenplay by: Tigmanshu Dhulia; Kamal Pandey
- Story by: Tigmanshu Dhulia
- Produced by: Tigmanshu Dhulia; Rahul Mittra; Nitin Tej Ahuja
- Starring: Jimmy Sheirgill; Mahi Gill; Irrfan Khan; Soha Ali Khan
- Cinematography: Yogesh Jani
- Edited by: Rahul Srivastava
- Music by: Sandeep Chowta; Mukhtar Sahota
- Production companies: Viacom 18 Motion Pictures; BrandSmith Motion Pictures; Moving Pictures; Tigmanshu Dhulia Films
- Distributed by: Viacom 18 Motion Pictures
- Release date: 8 March 2013
- Running time: 124 minutes
- Country: India
- Language: Hindi
- Budget: ₹19 crore
- Box office: ₹28.80 crore

Saheb Biwi Aur Gangster Returns (transl. The master, the wife and the gangster returns; Hindi pronunciation: [saːɦeːb biːbiː ɔːɾ]) is a 2013 Indian Hindi-language romantic thriller film written and directed by Tigmanshu Dhulia. It is the sequel to the 2011 film, Saheb, Biwi Aur Gangster and the second installment of the Saheb, Biwi Aur Gangster film series. The film stars Jimmy Sheirgill and Mahi Gill, who reprise their roles from the previous film, while new additions to the cast include Irrfan Khan and Soha Ali Khan. The film was released on 8 March 2013. Jimmy Shergill won Best Actor Award for this film at 11th Norway Bollywood Film Festival in Oslo. A sequel titled Saheb, Biwi Aur Gangster 3 was released on 27 July 2018.

== Plot ==
The Royal Scandal, the war for power, and the fight for money continue with the return of Saheb Biwi Aur Gangster. Aditya Pratap Singh is crippled and is trying to recover from his physical disability and his wife's betrayal. The lover and seductress Madhavi Devi is now an MLA; her relationship with Aditya may have broken into shambles, but her relationship with alcohol is deep, dark, and daunting. Indrajeet Singh (Irrfan Khan), a ragged prince who has lost everything but his pride, pledges to get back his family's respect, which was once destroyed by Aditya's ancestors. Ranjana is a modern, ambitious girl who is madly in love with Indrajeet Singh. The story takes a new turn when Aditya falls in love with Ranjana and forces Birendra, her father, into their marriage.

== Cast ==
- Jimmy Sheirgill as Aditya Pratap Singh / Sahab
- Mahi Gill as Madhavi Devi
- Irrfan Khan as Indrajeet Pratap Singh aka Raja Bhaiyya
- Soha Ali Khan as Ranjana
- Pravesh Rana as Param Pratap Singh
- Deepraj Rana as Kanhaiya
- Raj Babbar as Birendra Pratap aka Bunny
- Rajiv Gupta as MLA Prabhu Tiwari
- Charanpreet Singh as A journalist
- Sujay Shankarwar as Rudy
- Anjana Sukhani as item number
- Mugdha Godse in the item number "Media Se" (special appearance)
- Santosh Maurya as Thakur

== Production ==
=== Casting ===
The sequel was announced following the huge critical success of the first part, Saheb Biwi Aur Gangster. It was announced that Jimmy Sheirgill and Mahi Gill would be reprising their roles from the original film. In January 2012, Neil Nitin Mukesh was signed on to play the new gangster. However, due to differences between Mukesh and the film's producers, Mukesh was dropped from the part and Irrfan Khan was cast instead. Later in March, Soha Ali Khan was confirmed to play Irrfan Khan's love interest. Raj Babbar was soon cast to play the role of Soha Ali's father. Actress Neha Dhupia was to appear in an item number, but due to date issues, Mugdha Godse was signed instead.

=== Filming ===
Filming began in April 2012 in Gujarat in Santarampur and Devgadh Baria. It was wrapped in October 2012.

== Reception ==
=== Critical reception ===
The film was well received by critics. The performances of the main cast and the dialogues especially met with universal acclaim. On the review aggregator website Rotten Tomatoes, 83% of 6 critics' reviews are positive, with an average rating of 6.5/10.

Taran Adarsh of Bollywood Hungama gave the film 3.5/5 stars praising the performances of the main cast and the intricate character developments. Raja Sen of Rediff.com gave the film 4/5 stars and said Saheb. Biwi Aur Gangster Returns is better, sharper and more assured than the prequel. He called the dialogues "applause seeking" and also added, "Saheb Biwi Aur Gangster Returns is a theatrically indulgent entertainer, one that makes no bones about its pulpiness and stays well and truly juicy." Anupama Chopra of Hindustan Times gave the film 3/5 stars saying that the film should be seen for its characters and dialogue. Rajeev Masand of IBN Live gave the film 3/5 stars saying that the film is an engaging watch. Rummana Ahmed from Yahoo India awarded the film 4.5/5 stars, praising Irrfan Khan's performance and calling the film overall "a compelling watch".

=== Box office ===
Saheb Biwi Aur Gangster Returns had a slow start but grew up as time proceed and managed ₹3.22 crore on its opening day while around ₹11.91 crore in its first weekend to make a good total. It eventually netted ₹28.72 in domestic market. It managed $15,000 from overseas. The movie worldwide grossed ₹28.80 crore.

== Soundtrack ==
Saheb Biwi Aur Gangster Returns

Studio album by Sandeep Chowta
- Released: 10 February 2013
- Genre: Feature film soundtrack
- Label: Junglee Music

The film's soundtrack was released on 10 February 2013. The album contains five songs composed by Sandeep Chowta with lyrics by Sandeep Nath. A bonus song was later added to the film cut, "Dukh Thor Ditte Jugni", by music director Mukhtar Sahota, which became the opening song of the film.

=== Track list ===
No.	Title	Singer(s)	Length
1.	"Idhar Gire"	Sowmya Raoh	04:24
2.	"Jugni"	Jazzy B	03:28
3.	"Media Se"	Paroma Dasgupta	03:22
4.	"Bas Chal Kapat"	Piyush Mishra	04:03
5.	"Kona Kona Dil Ka"	Devaki Pandit	04:56
6.	"Dukh Thor Ditte Jugni (Music - Mukhtar Sahota)"	Harbhajan Shera

== Sequel ==
A third film in the series, Saheb, Biwi Aur Gangster 3 released on 27 July 2018.
