= Paan Singh Tomar (film) =

2010 Indian film directed by Tigmanshu Dhulia

- Theatrical release poster
- Directed by: Tigmanshu Dhulia
- Written by: Tigmanshu Dhulia; Sanjay Chauhan
- Based on: Life of Paan Singh Tomar
- Produced by: Ronnie Screwvala
- Starring: Irrfan Khan; Mahie Gill; Vipin Sharma; Nawazuddin Siddiqui
- Cinematography: Aseem Mishra
- Edited by: Aarti Bajaj
- Music by: Abhishek Ray
- Production company: UTV Spotboy
- Distributed by: UTV Motion Pictures
- Release dates: October 2010 (BFI London Film Festival); 2 March 2012 (India)
- Running time: 135 minutes
- Country: India
- Language: Hindi
- Budget: ₹70 million
- Box office: est. ₹201.80 million

Paan Singh Tomar is a 2010 Indian Hindi-language biographical film about Paan Singh Tomar, a soldier in the Indian Army and seven-time national steeplechase champion, who later became an armed dacoit against the corrupt system. The film is directed by Tigmanshu Dhulia and produced by UTV Motion Pictures. Irrfan Khan played the title role, with Mahie Gill, Vipin Sharma and Nawazuddin Siddiqui in the supporting cast.

Made on a shoestring budget of ₹45 million (US$470,000), Paan Singh Tomar premiered at the London Film Festival in 2010. Two years later it was released in domestic theatres on 2 March 2012 and was commercially successful at the box office, with worldwide gross of ₹201.80 million (US$2.1 million). The film won Best Feature and Best Actor at the 60th National Film Awards.

== Plot ==
An investigative journalist secures a covert meeting to interview Paan Singh Tomar, a notorious Chambal Valley rebel and dacoit whose gang has recently dominated national headlines following the execution of nine villagers. As Paan Singh recounts his journey from celebrated soldier to hunted outlaw, the narrative unfolds through an extended flashback beginning in 1950.

Paan Singh enlists in the Indian Army, leaving his wife, Indra, and elderly mother to look after the family’s ancestral homestead in Morena, Madhya Pradesh. During military training, Paan Singh displays remarkable stamina and endurance, quickly catching the attention of his commanding officers. Though initially indifferent to organized sports, he volunteers for the army's athletic division upon discovering that competing sportsmen receive unrestricted food rations. He initially trains for the 5,000-metre event, but his coach recognizes his natural agility and shifts him to the 3,000-metre steeplechase. Paan Singh dominates the discipline, capturing the gold medal at the Indian National Games for seven consecutive years and setting national records.

In 1958, he is selected to represent India at the Asian Games in Tokyo. However, an administrative oversight leads to him being issued unfamiliar running spikes just prior to the race, impeding his footing and causing him to narrowly miss a podium finish. Over the next decade, international conflicts break out—namely the 1962 Sino-Indian War and the 1965 Indo-Pakistani War. Eager to defend his country on the front lines, Paan Singh requests combat deployment, but military regulations protect elite national athletes from active warfare. Deeply frustrated by his confinement to athletic duties, he channels his focus back onto the track, eventually winning a gold medal at the International Military Games in 1967.

Paan Singh's athletic career comes to an abrupt halt when his brother arrives with distressing news: Bhanwar Singh, a wealthy and influential relative, has exploited Paan Singh's absence to illegally seize large tracts of their family’s ancestral farmland. Declining a promotion and an offer to stay on as an army sports coach, Paan Singh opts for early retirement and returns home to Morena to defend his family's property.

Back in the village, Paan Singh seeks an amicable resolution, but Bhanwar Singh refuses to negotiate. Paan Singh then petitions the civil authorities, lodging complaints with the local police and the District Collector. However, Bhanwar Singh uses his wealth and political connections to bribe officials, leaving the petitions ignored. The feud escalates when Bhanwar Singh’s henchmen physically assault Paan Singh's young son. Fearing for the boy's safety, Paan Singh sends him away to enlist in the army. Shortly afterward, Bhanwar Singh orchestrates an armed raid on the family compound, during which Paan Singh's elderly mother is beaten to death.

Devastated by his mother's murder and disillusioned with the judicial system, Paan Singh vows vengeance. He absconds into the ravines of the Chambal Valley, assembling a gang of outlaws and rebels (baaghis). To procure modern firearms and ammunition, the gang carries out targeted kidnappings and extortion rackets across the region. Heavily armed, Paan Singh raids Bhanwar Singh's fortified compound, hunting him down and executing him to avenge his mother's death.

Sometime later, nine local villagers inform law enforcement of the gang’s hideout in exchange for rewards. Evading the ambush, Paan Singh tracks down the informants and kills all nine men in retaliation. The mass execution sparks nationwide outrage, prompting the central government and state police to initiate a joint military and police manhunt across the ravines. Neighboring dacoit leaders advise Paan Singh to negotiate a surrender, but he adamantly refuses to lay down arms.

The narrative returns to the present as the journalist's published interview creates an uproar, forcing Paan Singh and his men to temporarily disband and go into hiding. During this lull, Paan Singh arranges clandestine meetings with his family and his former army coach. Both urge him to take advantage of an impending government amnesty offer. Paan Singh rejects the idea, bitterly pointing out the hypocrisy of the state: while his decades of service and national athletic medals went unrecognized when he cried out for justice, the nation instantly acknowledged him the moment he took up a gun to defend his dignity.

When the gang reconvenes in the ravines, Gopi, a trusted confidant within the inner circle, turns informant and betrays their rendezvous point to the authorities. Heavily armed police forces surround the hideout, ambushing the group. A fierce gun battle ensues, concluding with Paan Singh Tomar and his entire gang being shot and killed.

== Cast ==
- Irrfan Khan as Paan Singh Tomar
- Mahie Gill as Indra Singh Tomar
- Hemendra Dandotiya as
- Vipin Sharma as Major Masand
- Imran Hasnee as Matadeen Singh Tomar
- Nawazuddin Siddiqui as Gopi
- Zakir Hussain as Inspector Rathore
- Jahangir Khan as Bhanwar Singh (Daddaa)
- Sitaram Panchal as Ramcharan
- Rajendra Gupta as H.S. Randhawa (Sports Coach)
- Swapnil Kotriwar as Hanumant (Paan Singh's Elder Son)
- Brijendra Kala as Journalist
- Rajiv Gupta as Corrupt Cop
- Ravi Sah as Paan's nephew Balram

== Production ==
Director Tigmanshu Dhulia first learned about Tomar while working on the set of Bandit Queen in Chambal. Intrigued that Tomar was largely forgotten despite holding several records, he resolved to make a film about his life. Dhulia worked for the film for two years, interviewing Tomar's surviving family members and visiting his native village in Bhind.

Dhulia wanted to make the film after fully researching Tomar. After its world premiere in 2010, Dhulia was in dilemma whether he is glorifying Paan Singh Tomar or going to depicting his notoriety.

The film was shot in the ravines of Chambal, in Dholpur and in the actual barracks Tomar lived in at Roorkee. To prepare for his role, Irrfan Khan trained rigorously with steeplechase coaches, even breaking his ankle at one point during the filming. He called the experience "the most physically and mentally demanding film of my career".

== Soundtrack ==
The music was composed and arranged by Abhishek Ray. The soundtrack was largely Indian folk music with western influences.

Song No.	Song	Lyricist	Singer	Duration (In Minutes)
1	"Kero Mama"	Javed Akhtar	K. Mohan (Agnee), Meet Bros	2:29
2	"Dhai Dhai"	Sandeep Nath	Abhishek Ray, Kailash Kher Rahmat Khan Langa	4:00
3	"Jaao Dhal Jaao"	Kausar Munir	Abhishek Ray, Kailash Kher	3:21
4	"O Re Banwasi"	Manvendra	Vidhi Sharma, Ravleen Sabharwal	2:46
5	"Paan Singh Tomar" (Theme)		Irrfan Khan	1:52

== Release ==
Paan Singh Tomar was released in India on 2 March 2012.

== Critical reception ==
The New York Times praised Irrfan Khan's performance and wrote "Without romanticizing Paan Singh Tomar, he shows his basic honesty and gives him real depth. As an actor Mr. Khan rarely does the expected. You can’t take your eyes off him.". Rajeev Masand of IBN awarded the film 3.5 out of 5 stars, praising Khan's performance and said "Directed competently by Dhulia, who's familiar and comfortable even with the dusty terrain, Paan Singh Tomar is made with great attention to detail and paints an honest, realistic picture of an India few of us can claim to know." Avijit Ghosh of The Times of India rated the film 4 out of 5 stars and said "Sportsmen and outlaws inhabit two different universes. One shines amidst the bright lights of glory, and the other haunts the ravines of notoriety. But in director Tigmanshu Dhulia's biopic, Paan Singh Tomar, the two worlds collide. And the result is a rather exquisite blend of drama, humour and tragedy; altogether eminently enjoyable good cinema". Aseem Chhabra for Rediff.com gave the film 3.5 out of 5 stars and said "The tragedy of Paan Singh Tomar and Irrfan Khan's execution of the role are both compelling." Taran Adarsh of Bollywood Hungama gave the film 3.5 out of 5 stars and said "Paan Singh Tomar shatters the standard rules of this genre. Besides, the film makes you cognizant that serious cinema can be uniformly delightful, like any other enthralling entertainer." Blessy Chettiar of DNA rated the film 4 out of 5 stars and said, "Gritty and power-packed, Paan Singh Tomar is a tribute to the unsung heroes of sports in India. Dhulia's direction and Irrfan's integrity will make [it] among the best movies of recent times.". Shubhra Gupta of The Indian Express gave the film 4 out of 5 stars and said "Paan Singh Tomar is a completely gripping, near-flawless film, with such few dodgy parts as to be negligible.".

== Box office collection ==
Paan Singh Tomar grossed ₹65.0 million (US$670,000) in first week. The movie managed to gross ₹35.0 million (US$360,000) in the second week. The movie collected ₹30 million (US$310,000) in its third week and was declared a semi-hit by Box Office India.

== Awards and nominations ==
Award	Category	Recipient(s)	Ref(s)
60th National Film Awards	Best Feature Film	Ronnie Screwvala; Tigmanshu Dhulia	
60th National Film Awards	Best Actor	Irrfan Khan	
58th Filmfare Awards	Critics Award for Best Actor	Irrfan Khan	
58th Filmfare Awards	Best Screenplay	Sanjay Chauhan and Tigmanshu Dhulia	
19th Screen Awards	Best Film	Ronnie Screwvala	
19th Screen Awards	Best Actor	Irrfan Khan (alongside Ranbir Kapoor for Barfi!)	
19th Screen Awards	Best Screenplay	Sanjay Chauhan, Tigmanshu Dhulia	
Zee Cine Awards 2013	Best Dialogue	Sanjay Chauhan, Tigmanshu Dhulia	
Times of India Film Awards	Best Actor	Irrfan Khan	
CNN-IBN Indian of the Year	Entertainment	Irrfan Khan	

== See also ==
- List of films about the sport of athletics
