= Mahie Gill =

Indian actress (born 1975)

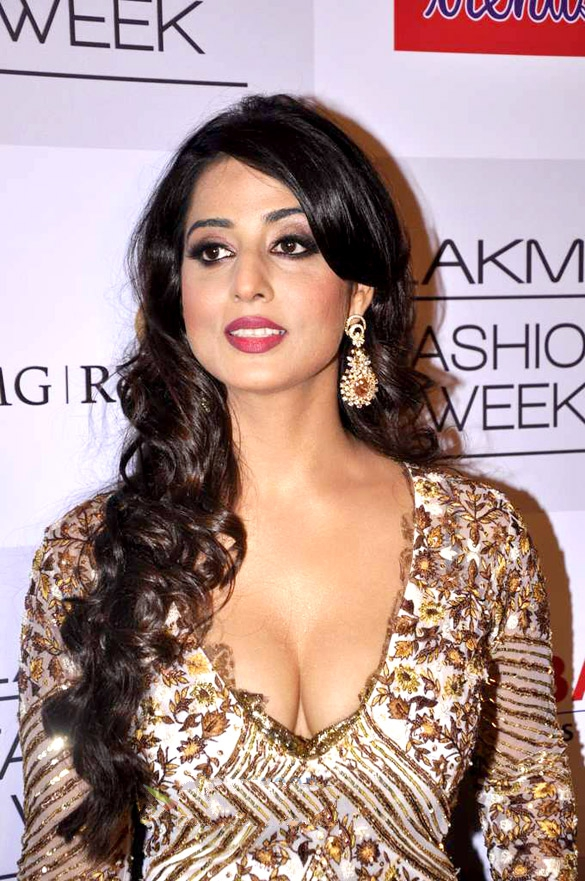
- Gill in 2018
- Born: Rimpy Kaur Gill; 19 December 1975 (age 50); Chandigarh, India
- Education: Panjab University
- Occupation: Actress
- Years active: 2003–present
- Spouse: Ravi Kesar
- Children: 1

Rimpy Kaur Gill, known professionally as Mahie Gill (born 19 December 1975), is an Indian actress who works primarily in Hindi and Punjabi-language films. She began her acting career in Punjabi cinema before making her Hindi film debut with Dev.D (2009), directed by Anurag Kashyap.

Gill received wider recognition for her portrayal of Paro in Dev.D, a modern adaptation of Sarat Chandra Chattopadhyay’s novella Devdas, for which she won the Filmfare Critics Award for Best Actress in 2010. She later appeared as Madhavi Devi in Saheb, Biwi Aur Gangster and its sequel Saheb, Biwi Aur Gangster Returns.

== Early life and education ==
Gill was born in Chandigarh in a Punjabi Jat Sikh family on 19 December in 1975. She completed her master's degree in theater from Panjab University, Chandigarh in 1998.

== Career ==
Gill got her first break with the Punjabi based Bollywood film Hawayein and has done a couple of Punjabi films along with theatre. Anurag first saw her at a party and instantly finalized her to play the character of Paro in the movie Dev.D. She worked in Ram Gopal Verma's Not a Love Story, which was based on the Niraj Grover Murder case of 2008. She also worked in Saheb, Biwi Aur Gangster with Jimmy Sheirgill and Randeep Hooda, which was released on 30 September 2011. This movie earned her a nomination at the Filmfare Awards for Best Actress.

Gill appeared in Paan Singh Tomar with Irrfan Khan. Based on the story of an athlete who became a dacoit, she played the title character's wife. Gill made her Telugu debut with Apoorva Lakhia's film Thoofan, simultaneously shot with the Hindi version, Zanjeer. She appeared in an item number in Tigmanshu Dhulia's film Bullett Raja.

Gill appeared in the 2021 web series 1962: The War In The Hills, directed by Mahesh Manjrekar. The series features Abhay Deol, Sumeet Vyas, and Akash Thosar. She also appeared in the second season of the web-series, Your Honor.

== Personal life ==
Gill has lived in Goa and has a daughter, Veronica. In 2023, she confirmed that she is married to Ravi Kesar.

== Filmography ==
=== Films ===
Key
†	Denotes films that have not yet been released

Year	Title	Role	Language	Notes	Ref(s).
2003	Hawayein	Laaliii	Hindi		
2004	Khushi Mil Gayee		Punjabi		
2006	Sirf Panch Din		Punjabi		
2007	Khoya Khoya Chand	Starlet at Prem Kumar's house	Hindi		
2007	Mitti Wajaan Maardi	Raani	Punjabi		
2008	Chak De Phatte	Simran	Punjabi		
2009	Dev.D	Parminder 'Paro'	Hindi	Filmfare Critics Award for Best Actress	
2009	Gulaal	Madhuri	Hindi		
2009	Pal Pal Dil Ke Ssaat	Dolly	Hindi	Credited as Rimpy Gill	
2009	Aagey Se Right	Sonia Bhatt	Hindi		
2010	Dabangg	Nirmala	Hindi		
2010	Mirch		Hindi	Special appearance in an item number	
2011	Utt Pataang	Sanjana Mahadik	Hindi		
2011	Not a Love Story	Anusha Chawla	Hindi		
2011	Saheb, Biwi Aur Gangster	Madhavi Devi	Hindi	Nominated—Filmfare Award for Best Actress	
2011	Michael	Rwitika	Hindi		
2012	Paan Singh Tomar	Indira	Hindi		
2012	Carry On Jatta	Mahie Kaur	Punjabi		
2012	Dabangg 2	Nirmala Pandey	Hindi		
2013	Saheb, Biwi Aur Gangster Returns	Madhavi Devi	Hindi		
2013	Zanjeer	Mona	Hindi		
2013	Bullett Raja	Special appearance in song "Don't Touch My Body"	Hindi		
2013	Gang of Ghosts	Manoranjana Kumari	Hindi		
2014	Buddha in a Traffic Jam	Charu Siddhu	Hindi		
2014	Buddha in a Traffic Jam	Charu Siddhu	English		
2015	Shareek	Jassi	Punjabi		
2015	Hey Bro	Special appearance in the song "Bulbul"	Hindi		
2016	Aatishbazi Ishq	Veera'n	Punjabi	Also Producer	
2017	Wedding Anniversary	Kahaani	Hindi		
2018	Phamous	Teacher Rosy	Hindi		
2018	Saheb, Biwi Aur Gangster 3	Madhavi Devi	Hindi		
2019	Family of Thakurganj	Sharbati	Hindi		
2019	Posham Pa	Prajakta Deshpande	Hindi		
2020	Durgamati	Satakshi Ganguly	Hindi		
2020	Doordarshan	Priya Bhateja aka Billo	Hindi		
2021	Jora: The Second Chapter	Rajveer Randhawa	Punjabi		
2024	Naam	Mahi	Hindi		

=== Web series ===
Year	Title	Role	Language	Platform
2018	Apharan - Sabka Katega	Madhu Tyagi/Malini	Hindi	ALTBalaji
2019	Fixerr	Kesar Maalik	Hindi	ALTBalaji and ZEE5
2021	1962: The War in the Hills	Shagun Singh	Hindi	Disney+ Hotstar
2021	Your Honor	Yashpreet	Hindi	SonyLIV
2021	Your Honor	Yashpreet	Punjabi	SonyLIV

== Awards and nominations ==
Filmfare Awards

- 2010: Best Actress (Critics); Dev.D
- 2012: Best Actress; Saheb, Biwi Aur Gangster (nominated)

Screen Awards

- 2010: Most Promising Newcomer – Female; Dev.D

IIFA Awards

- 2010: IIFA Star Debut Award; Dev.D
- 2010: Best Actress; Dev D (nominated)
- 2012: Best Actress; Saheb Biwi aur Gangster (nominated)

BIG Star Entertainment Awards

- 2013: Most Entertaining Actor in a Thriller Film – Female; Saheb, Biwi Aur Gangster Returns
