= Rana Mazumder =

Indian singer

- Also known as: Rana Muzumdar, Rana Da
- Born: Raiganj, West-Bengal, India
- Genres: Film score
- Occupation(s): Playback singer, music director
- Instrument(s): Keyboard, Vocals

Rana Mazumder (sometimes credited as Rana Muzumdar) is an Indian music director and playback singer. His most recent work includes the 2018 movie Saheb, Biwi Aur Gangster 3 where his arrangement of Lag Jaa Gale was sung by Jonita Gandhi. Mazumder was also nominated at the 63rd Filmfare Awards for his work on the song Khol De Baahein from the movie Meri Pyaari Bindu, sung by Monali Thakur. He also sung many Bengali film songs of Jeet Gannguli compositions. Rana has also composed the song Ye Kya Hua in the web series Broken But Beautiful sung by Shreya Goshal and Dev Negi penned by Amitabh Bhattacharya which then go on to become opening theme of the web series.
