= Tigmanshu Dhulia =

Indian filmmaker and actor (born 1967)

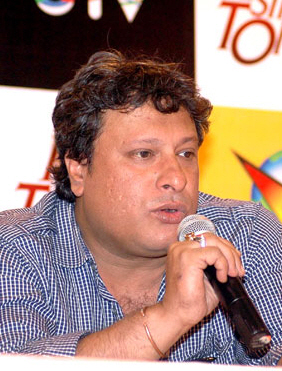
- Dhulia in 2012
- Born: 3 July 1967 (age 59); Prayagraj, Uttar Pradesh, India
- Occupations: Film director, film producer, screenwriter, actor
- Years active: 1991–present
- Relatives: Sudhanshu Dhulia (Brother)

Tigmanshu Dhulaiya (born 3 July 1967) is an Indian filmmaker and actor, known for his works in Hindi cinema and Television. He wrote the dialogue for the 1998 film Dil Se.., the first Bollywood film to chart in the UK top ten, and screened at the Berlin International Film Festival. His directing career has also garnered international recognition with the biographical film Paan Singh Tomar, premiered at the 2010 BFI London Film Festival and the thriller drama Saheb, Biwi Aur Gangster.

Paan Singh Tomar eventually went on to win the National Film Award for Best Feature Film in 2012. His sequel film Saheb, Biwi Aur Gangster Returns gained critical acclaim. He is also well known for his role as Ramadhir Singh in Anurag Kashyap's modern cult film Gangs of Wasseypur. Dhulia holds a master's degree in theatre from the National School of Drama, at New Delhi.

== Early life and education ==
Dhulia was born and raised in Allahabad, Uttar Pradesh, India, where his father was a judge at the Allahabad High Court, while his mother was a professor of Sanskrit. He is the youngest of three brothers, one of whom later joined the Navy, while the other is a former judge at the Supreme Court of India. He attended St Joseph's College, Allahabad, then Allahabad University where he majored in English, Economics and Modern History. After graduating in 1986 he took a master's degree in theatre at the National School of Drama in New Delhi, completing the course in 1989. His brother Sudhanshu Dhulia is a former judge of the Supreme Court of India.

== Career ==
In 1990 he moved to Mumbai where he worked as casting director on the film Bandit Queen, a Phoolan Devi biopic. He was casting director for 1995's Stiff Upper Lips, in which he also had a cameo role as a stallholder, and 2000's The Warrior, directed by Asif Kapadia. Dhulia started his career by assisting Pradip Krishen in Electric Moon (1992) and Ketan Mehta in Sardar (1993). Thereafter he turned to television, and during the 90s Dhulia directed and produced several television programs, including the six-part Krishna's Dream for UK Channel Four. Kahani Ek Kanya Ki (1991) was written for Doordarshan, and Hum Bambai Nahin Jayenge (1993), for BI Television, was set in an acting school. 1996's Just Mohabbat was the story of a boy's coming-of-age, and Naya Daur (1995) adapted a classic Hindi novel by Bhagwati Charan Verma for Zee TV.

Dhulia's 1999 series Star Bestsellers, a sequence of six 45-minute short stories ("Ek Sham Ki Mulaqat", "Fursat Main", "Hum Saath Saath Hain Kya", "Anekon Hitler", "Musafir", and "Bhawaron Ne Khilaya Phool"), won him popular recognition. His 2005 comedy Who Dus Din, for Star TV, satirised the Indian film industry, while Ek Duje Ke Liye, produced the same year and also for Star TV, was an adaptation of Neil Simon's play The Odd Couple. He also directed the TV serial 'Rajdhaani' for Starplus featuring Neha Dhupia.

He directed his first feature film, Haasil in 2003, a love story set among politicised students in northern India. The film was critically well received and has gained a cult following. Haasil was nominated for six awards (including best directorial debut) at the Zee Cine Awards, where it won for best screenplay. His second film Charas: A Joint Operation was a thriller concerning drug cartels, shot in marijuana-growing regions of Himachal Pradesh. In 2011, Tigmanshu has come up with two films – the first one being Shagird which released on 13 May and the second one was Saheb, Biwi Aur Gangster.

Dhulia's film Paan Singh Tomar released on 2 March 2012 and won him wide critical acclaim including National Film Award for Best Feature Film. He has announced four other upcoming projects, Saheb, Biwi Aur Gangster Returns (2013), Milan Talkies, Jai Ramji, Bullett Raja, and Sultana Daku.

== Filmography ==
=== Films ===
Year	Film	Director	Actor	Producer	Screenwriter	Casting director
1992	Electric Moon		Yes			
1994	Bandit Queen					Yes
1995	Bombay Blues					Yes
1996	Tere Mere Sapne				Yes	
1998	Stiff Upper Lips					Yes
1998	Dil Se..		Yes		Yes	
2002	Bas Itna Sa Khwaab Hai				Yes	
2003	Haasil	Yes			Yes	
2004	Charas	Yes			Yes	
2005	Family: Ties of Blood				Yes	
2011	Saheb Biwi Aur Gangster	Yes	Yes		Yes	
2011	Shagird	Yes			Yes	
2012	Paan Singh Tomar	Yes			Yes	
2012	Gangs of Wasseypur		Yes			
2013	Bullett Raja	Yes		Yes	Yes	
2013	Saheb, Biwi Aur Gangster Returns	Yes		Yes	Yes	
2013	Shahid		Yes			
2015	Hero		Yes			
2015	Manjhi - The Mountain Man		Yes			
2017	Raag Desh	Yes			Yes	
2018	Zero		Yes			
2018	Baarish Aur Chowmein	Yes			Yes	
2018	Saheb, Biwi Aur Gangster 3	Yes		Yes	Yes	
2019	Milan Talkies	Yes	Yes	Yes	Yes	
2020	Raat Akeli Hai		Yes			
2020	Yaara	Yes		Yes		
2022	Holy Cow		Yes			
2025	Tu Meri Poori Kahani		Yes			
2026	Pati Patni Aur Woh Do		Yes			
2026	Ghamasaan	Yes		Yes		

=== Television ===
Year	Title	Creator	Director	Writer	Producer	Notes
1993	Krishna's Dream		Yes	Yes		Episode: "Kahani Ek Kanya Ki"
1993	Hum Bambai Nahin Jayenge		Yes		Yes	
1995	Naya Daur		Yes			
1999–2000	Star Bestsellers		Yes	Yes		6 episodes (Note: "Ek Shaam Ki Mulakaat" "Bhoron Ne Khilaya Phool" "Anekoe Hitlers" "Fursat Mein" "Hum Saath Saath Hain Kya?" "Musafir")
1999	Rajdhani		Yes			
2005	Woh Dus Din		Yes			
2019	Criminal Justice		Yes			Co-directed with Vishal Furia
2019	Out of Love		Yes			
2022	The Great Indian Murder		Yes	Yes		
2023	Garmi	Yes	Yes	Yes		

Acting credits

Year	Title	Role	Notes
1991	Krishna's Dream	Unknown	Episode: "Kahani Ek Kanya Ki"
2014	Yudh	Minister	
2018; 2025	CID	Barbosa	
2018	Rangbaaz	Ramshankar Tiwari	
2019	Fixerr	Yashpal Sahrawat	
2021	Tandav	PM Devki Nandan Singh	
2021	Call My Agent: Bollywood	Himself	Episode: "In Loving Memory"
2023	Kaalkoot	Mani Shankar Tripathi	
2023	Commando	Bakshi	
2025	Black, White & Gray - Love Kills	Officer Chauhan	

== Awards ==
National Film Awards

- National Film Award for Best Feature Film – Paan Singh Tomar – Director – 2013

Filmfare Awards

- Filmfare Award for Best Screenplay – Paan Singh Tomar – 2013
- Nominated – Filmfare Award for Best Screenplay – Saheb, Biwi Aur Gangster – 2012

Stardust Awards

- Best Director – Saheb, Biwi Aur Gangster – 2012

SAARC Film Festival

- Best Director – Paan Singh Tomar- June 2013

Filmfare OTT Awards
