= Javed Ali discography =

Discography of Indian playback singer Javed Ali

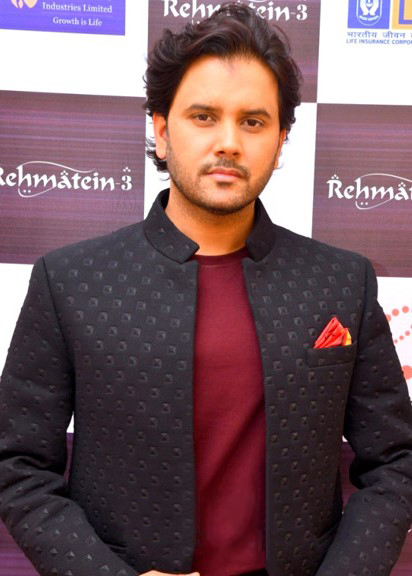
- Ali in 2017
- Singles: tum hi ho

Javed Ali is an Indian playback singer who predominantly sings in Hindi. He has also sung in various Indian languages including Bengali, Kannada, Malayalam, Gujarati, Marathi, Odia, Tamil, Telugu and Urdu.

== Hindi film songs ==
Year	Film	Song	Composer(s)	Co-singer(s)
2000	Beti No. 1	"Chori Chori Aankh"	Viju Shah	
2001	Paagalpan	"A Ding Dong Do"	Raju Singh	
2002	Zamaanat	"Kya Mohabbat"	Viju Shah	Alka Yagnik
2003	Haasil	"Ab Ghar Aaja"	Jatin–Lalit	
2003	Haasil	"Tu Hi Tu"	Jatin–Lalit	Roopkumar Rathod
2004	Chameli	"Bhigee Hui Koi"	Sandesh Shandilya	
2004	Kyun...! Ho Gaya Na	"Baat Samjha Karo"	Shankar–Ehsaan–Loy	Shankar Mahadevan, Chetan Shashital
2005	Bunty Aur Babli	"Kajra Re"	Shankar–Ehsaan–Loy	Alisha Chinai, Shankar Mahadevan
2005	Dil Jo Bhi Kahey...	"Sajna Angana"	Shankar–Ehsaan–Loy	
2005	Neal 'N' Nikki	"Akh Ladiye"	Salim–Sulaiman	
2005	Sab Kuch Hai Kuch Bhi Nahi	"Lahar Lahar"	Jatin–Lalit	Shreya Ghoshal
2006	Golmaal: Fun Unlimited	"Rehja Re"	Vishal–Shekhar	
2006	Golmaal: Fun Unlimited	"Rehja Re"(Remix)	Vishal–Shekhar	
2006	Malamaal Weekly	"Hansani O Meri"	Uttankk V Vorra	Shreya Ghoshal
2006	Malamaal Weekly	"Hansani O"(Remix)	Uttankk V Vorra	Shreya Ghoshal
2006	Malamaal Weekly	"Sar Sar Sar Sarti Hava"	Uttankk V Vorra	Mahalakshmi Iyer
2006	Malamaal Weekly	"Yeh Ajooba"	Uttankk V Vorra	Mahalakshmi Iyer
2006	Malamaal Weekly	"Yeh Ajooba"(Remix)	Uttankk V Vorra	Mahalakshmi Iyer
2006	Mere Dil Leke Dekkho	"Dil Leja Leja"	Jatin–Lalit	Sadhana Sargam
2006	Mere Dil Leke Dekkho	"Mohabbat Kya Hai"	Jatin–Lalit	Sunidhi Chauhan
2006	Yun Hota Toh Kya Hota	"Ek Baar Jaana"	Viju Shah	Madhushree
2006	Zindaggi Rocks	"Meri Dhoop Hai Tu"	Anu Malik	Tulsi Kumar
2006	Zindaggi Rocks	"Meri Dhoop"(Remix)	Anu Malik	
2007	Icy N Spicy	"Super Icy"	Dilip Sen	
2007	Goal	"Tara Tu"	Pritam	
2007	Jab We Met	"Nagada Nagada"	Pritam	
2007	Jai Jagannatha	"Kalyug Ke Narayan"	Akshya Mohanty	
2007	My Friend Ganesha	"Teri Deewani"	Nirmal - Shekar	
2007	Naqaab	"Ek Din Teri Raahon"	Pritam	
2007	Sivaji: The Boss	"Suraj Hai Chanda Hai"	A. R. Rahman	
2008	A Wednesday	''Bekali''	Sanjoy Chowdhury	
2008	Dhara	"Chhuliye Honth"	Saurabh Mukherjee	
2008	Dhara	"Haadse Kuch"	Saurabh Mukherjee	
2008	Jodhaa Akbar	''Jashn-E-Bahaara''	A. R. Rahman	
2008	Ghajini	''Guzaarish''	A. R. Rahman	Sonu Nigam
2008	Ghajini	"Guzaarish" (Remix)	A. R. Rahman	
2008	Mission Istanbul	''Yaar Mera Dildaara''	Anu Malik	
2008	Pehli Nazar Ka Pyaar	"O Soniya"	Ali - Ghani	Shaan
2008	Saas Bahu Aur Sensex	"Abhi Abhi Jo Tu"	Randolph Correia	
2008	Yuvvraaj	''Tu Muskura''	A. R. Rahman	Alka Yagnik
2009	8 x 10 Tasveer	"Tasveer Teri"	Ismail Darbar	
2009	Ajab Prem Ki Ghazab Kahani	''Aa Jao Meri Tamanna''	Pritam	
2009	Ajab Prem Ki Ghazab Kahani	"Aa Jao Meri Tamanna"(Remix)	Pritam	
2009	De Dana Dan	''Gale Lag Ja''	Pritam	Banjyotsna
2009	De Dana Dan	"Gale Lag"(Version ll)	Pritam	Banjyotsna, Dominique Cerejo
2009	Dekh Bhai Dekh	"Sapne Bhaye"	Shadab Bhartiya	
2009	Delhi-6	''Araziyan''	A. R. Rahman	Kailash Kher
2009	Dhoondte Reh Jaaoge	"Nako Re Nako"	Sajid–Wajid	
2009	Jai Veeru	"Agre Ki Ghagra"	Bappi Lahiri	
2009	Key Club	"Tujhse Hi To Meri"	Shivam Bagchi	
2009	Meri Padosan	"Meri Padosan"	Ravi Meet, Manoj Negi	
2009	Maruti Mera Dosst	"Jiya Re Jiya Re"	Karthik Shah	
2009	Prem Kaa Game	''Tu Hi Meri''	Pritam	
2009	Ruslaan	"Har Ek Lamhe"(Version l)	Raees Jamal Khan	
2009	Ruslaan	"Har Ek Lamhe"(Version ll)	Raees Jamal Khan	
2009	Shaabash You Can Do It	"Ek Haqeeqat Tum"	Santokh Singh	
2009	Short Kut	"Kyun Hota Hai"	Shankar–Ehsaan–Loy	Shreya Ghoshal
2009	Tum Mile	''Tu Hi Haqeeqat''	Pritam	
2009	Tum Mile	''Tum Mile'' (Reprise)	Pritam	
2009	World Cupp 2011	"My Heart Says To Me"	Aadesh Shrivastava	
2010	13 May Gulaabi Nagar	"Aise Nahi Jiya"	Lakshmi - Vsanth	
2010	13 May Gulaabi Nagar	"Gori Sun Le"	Lakshmi - Vsanth	
2010	Raavan	''Ranjha Ranjha''	A. R. Rahman	Rekha Bhardwaj
2010	Aakrosh	''Sauda Hai''	Pritam	Anupam Amod
2010	Apartment	"Ghar Dil Mein"	Bappa Lahiri	Shreya Ghoshal
2010	Jhootha Hi Sahi	"Mayya Yashoda"(Jamuna Mix)	A. R. Rahman	Chinmayi
2010	Jhootha Hi Sahi	"Mayya Yashoda"(Thames Mix)	A. R. Rahman	Chinmayi
2010	Phaans	"Yaar Ko Sajda"	Dilip Sen	
2010	Prem Kaa Game	"Tum Hi Mere"	Raju Singh	
2010	Robot	"Kilimanjaro"	A. R. Rahman	Chinmayi
2010	Toonpur Ka Superrhero	''Jeetoge Tum''	Anu Malik	
2010	Toh Baat Pakki	"Dil Le Jaa"	Pritam	Shilpa Rao, Jassi Sidhu
2010	Toh Baat Pakki	"Dil Le Jaa"(Remix)	Pritam	
2011	Bas Ek Tamanna	"Ujla Sa Jo Chand"	Onkar Minhas	
2011	Bubble Gum	"Nostalgia"	Bapi–Tutul	
2011	Happy Husbands	"Love You"	Anay Sharma	
2011	I Am Kalam	"Rang Jama Le"	Madhuparna	
2011	Jaana Pehchana	"Zindagi Mein Kahin"	Ravindra Jain	
2011	Milta Hai Chance By Chance	"Hai Sharbati"	Afsar - Sajid	Mahalakshmi Iyer
2011	Naa Jaane Kabse	"Ishq Waale Zamaane"	Jatin Pandit	Mahalakshmi Iyer
2011	Yamla Pagla Deewana	''Tinku Jiya''	Anu Malik	Mamta Sharma
2011	Thank You	''Pyaar Mein''	Pritam	Neeraj Shridhar
2011	Thank You	''Haar Gharein''	Pritam	
2011	Yeh Saali Zindagi	''Dil Dar-Ba-Dar''	Nishat Khan	
2011	Yeh Saali Zindagi	''Ishq Tere Jalwe''	Nishat Khan	
2011	Yeh Saali Zindagi	''Kaise Kahein Alvida''	Nishat Khan	
2011	Yeh Saali Zindagi	"Sararara"(Version ll)	Nishat Khan	
2011	Rockstar	''Kun Faya Kun''	A. R. Rahman	Mohit Chauhan, A. R. Rahman
2011	U R My Jaan	"Chand Wahi Hai"	Sanjeev–Darshan	Shreya Ghoshal
2012	Bumboo	"Pinky Punjabi"	Santoshk Singh	Sunidhi Chauhan
2012	Bumboo	"Pinky Punjabi"(Reprise)	Santoshk Singh	Sunidhi Chauhan
2012	Chal Pichchur Banate Hain	''Bas Tu Hi''	Gaurav Dagaonkar	Shreya Ghoshal
2012	Ekk Deewana Tha	"Zohra Jabeen"	A. R. Rahman	
2012	Ghost	"Dil Ke Liye"	Sharib Toshi	
2012	Ishaqzaade	''Ishaqzaade''	Amit Trivedi	Shreya Ghoshal
2012	Jab Tak Hai Jaan	''Jab Tak Hai Jaan''	A. R. Rahman	Shakthisree Gopalan
2012	Jannat 2	"Tera Deedar Hua"	Pritam	
2012	Khiladi 786	"Tu Hoor Pari"	Himesh Reshammiya	Shreya Ghoshal
2012	Love Possible	"Jaagi Jaagi Si"	Afsar - Sajid	
2012	Married 2 America	"Dil Ki Itni Kahani"	Anwar Hussain	
2012	Married 2 America	"Dil Ki Itni Kahani"(Sad)	Anwar Hussain	
2012	Paanch Ghantey Mien Paanch Crore	"Kya Wajah Thi Tere"	Tony Kakkar	
2012	Raaz 3	''Deewana Kar Raha Hai''	Rashid Khan	
2012	Rowdy Rathore	''Tera Ishq Bada Teekha''	Sajid-Wajid	Shreya Ghoshal
2012	Teri Meri Kahaani	''Kareeb Aa Jao''	Sajid–Wajid	
2013	Baat Bann Gayi	"Katto Rani"	Harpreet Singh	
2013	Bloody Isshq	"Hawa Lagi Hai"	Ashok Bhadra	June Banerjee
2013	D-Day	"Murshid Khele Holi"	Shankar–Ehsaan–Loy	Shankar Mahadevan
2013	Dehraadun Diary	"Piya"	Ripul Sharma	
2013	Dilli Gang	"Tamam Umr Ka"	Amjad - Nadeem	
2013	Raanjhanaa	''Tum Tak''	A.R Rahman	Keerti Sagathia
2013	Once Upon a Time in Mumbaai Dobara	''Tayyab Ali''	Pritam, Laxmikant–Pyarelal	
2013	Once Upon a Time in Mumbaai Dobara	''Chugliyaan''	Pritam	
2013	I Don't Luv U	"Mere Khuda"	Aman - Benson	
2013	Karle Pyaar Karle	''Mutasir''	Rashid Khan	
2013	Main Krishna Hoon	"Govinda Aala Re"	Amjad - Nadeem	
2013	Rajjo	"Kaise Milun Mein"	Uttam Singh	Bela Shende
2013	Rajjo	"Mere Ghoongru"	Uttam Singh	Bela Shende
2013	War Chhod Na Yaar	"Main Jagoon"	Aslam Keyi	Shreya Ghoshal
2014	Angry Young Man	"Khamoshiyan"	Amjad - Nadeem	
2014	Badlapur Boys	"More Saiyyan"	Raju Sardar	Shreya Ghoshal
2014	Chal Bhaag	"Teri Maujudgi"	Satish Kashyap	
2014	Karle Pyaar Karle	"Mutasir"	Rashid Khan	
2014	Daawat-e-Ishq	''Daawat-e-Ishq''	Sajid–Wajid	Sunidhi Chauhan
2014	Don't Quit Youngistan	''Mere Maula Sun''	Robby Badal	
2014	Guardians	"Roothna Hai"	Omkar Rana	
2014	Gunday	''Jashn-E-Ishqa''	Sohail Sen	Shadaab Faridi
2014	Hawaa Hawaai	"Sar Utha Ke"	Hitesh Sonik	
2014	Jigariyaa	"Ishq Hai"(Duet)	Agnel Roman - Faizan	
2014	Jigariyaa	"Ishq Hai"(Solo)	Agnel Roman - Faizan	
2014	Kochadaiiyaan	"Bol De"	A. R. Rahman	
2014	Kochadaiiyaan	"Mera Gham"	A. R. Rahman	Shreya Ghoshal
2014	Life Mein Twist Hai	"Minnar Karta Hu"	Aryan Jaiin	
2014	Life Mein Twist Hai	"Bandgi Tu Meri"	Aryan Jaiin	
2014	Lingaa	"India Re"	A. R. Rahman	
2014	M3 - Midsummer Midnight Mumbai	''Labon Se Labon Ki''	Afroz Khan	
2014	Main Tera Hero	''Galat Baat Hai''	Sajid–Wajid	Neeti Mohan
2014	Meinu Ek Ladki Chaahiye	"Main Sifar Me"	Ravi Pawar	
2015	Bajrangi Bhaijaan	''Tu Jo Mila''	Pritam	
2015	Bezubaan Ishq	"Bezubaan Ishq"	Rupesh Varma	Arpita Chakraborty
2015	Four Pillars of Basement	"Udne Lagaa"	Mudasir Ali	
2015	Honour Killing	"Balle Balle Shava"	Uttam Singh	
2015	Hum Tum Dushman Dushman	"Ishq Sai"	Ali Ghany	
2015	I Love Desi	"Dooriyan"	Toshi Sabri - Shaarib Sabri	Mahalakshmi Iyer
2015	Ishq Ke Parindey	"Tumse Mil Ke"	Vijay Varma	Palak Muchhal
2015	Ishq Ke Parindey	"Rab Se Maang"	Rashid Khan	Palak Muchhal
2015	Ishq Ke Parindey	"Maula Karde"	Rashid Khan	
2015	Jai Jawaan Jai Kisaan	"Saj Ke Chali Hai"	Rupesh - Girish	
2015	Puli	"Jingiliya Jingiliya"	Devi Sri Prasad	Mamta Sharma
2015	Rudhramadevi	"Naina Tu Sunaina"	Ilaiyaraaja	Sadhana Sargam
2015	Sorry Daddy	"Zindagi Ke Dard"	Vishnu Deva	
2015	Take It Easy	"O Kaat"	Papply - Priya	
2015	Tere Ishq Mein Qurbaan	"Tera Deedar"	Harsh Vyas	Jaspinder Narula
2015	Yeh Ishq Sarfira	"Ittefaq Se Ishq"	Pranav - Ayaan	
2016	30 Minutes	"Soona Sara Lage"	Naresh Vikal	
2016	31st October	"Umeed"	Vijay Varma	
2016	1982 - A Love Marriage	"Koi Aaye"	Anurag - Chinmayi	
2016	Awesome Mausam	"Lalila Majnu"	Vijay Varma	Monali Thakur
2016	Bhouri	"Ho Gaya Hai Ishak"	Sanjay Pathak	
2016	Brahmaand Nayak Sai Baba	"Deva Ho Deva"	Sanjay Anand Raj	
2016	Nannaku Prematho	"Follow Follow"	Devi Sri Prasad	
2016	Citizen Charter	''Ae Hindustan Tuzhe Banayenge''	Saarthak Kalla	
2016	Cute Kameena	"Yeh Shehar Mehboob"	Krsna Solo	
2016	Deewaren	''Deewaran''	Vinay Jaiswal	
2016	Dhara 302	"Maula Kar Rahem"	Sahil Multy Khan	
2016	Dil Sala Sanki	''Tu Kahan''	Promod Panth	
2016	Dongri Ka Raja	"Madad Al Madad"	Asad Khan	Bela Shende
2016	Ek Kahani Julie Ki	"Saiyaan Ve"	DJ Sheizwood	
2016	Happy Bhag Jayegi	''Yaaram''	Sohail Sen	
2016	Ishq Forever	"Ishq Ki Baarish"	Nadeem saifi	Shreya Ghoshal
2016	Love Ke Funday	"Ye Pyaar Hai"	Prakash Prabhakar	
2016	Luv U Alia	"Love You Alia"	Jassie Gift	
2016	Meeradha	"Sajna"	Archit Tak	
2016	Shaukeen Kaminay	''Ek Tu Hi Tu''	Dharam Dewda	
2016	Wazir	''Maula''	Shantanu Moitra	
2016	Yea Toh Two Much Ho Gayaa	''Hairat-e-Aashiqui''	Avishek Majumder	
2017	Bachche Kachche Sachche	"Waqt"	Ravi Shankar	
2017	Kutumb The Family	"Ishq Mein Tere"	Aryan Jaiin	
2017	Luv Shv Pyar Vyar	"Karke Dua"	Gufy	
2017	Mirza Juuliet	"Teri Razamandi"	Krsna Solo	
2017	Mr. Kabaadi	"Tere Ishara De De"	Ali Ghani	
2017	Mukkadarpur Ka Manju	"O Re Jiya"	Siddhanth Sharma	
2017	Panchlait	"Gaa Bhaiya Gaa"	Kalyani Sen Bharat	
2017	Panchlait	"Hum Tujhse Mohabbat"	Kalyani Sen Bharat	
2017	Panchlait	"Pyaar Hai"	Kalyani Sen Bharat	
2017	Panchlait	"Teri Khatir Tere"	Kalyani Sen Bharat	
2017	Raees	''Saanson Ke''	JAM8	
2017	Tera Intezaar	"Abhagi Piya Ki"	Raja Aashoo	Payal Dev
2017	The Dream Job	"Maula Maula"	Ronak Runwal	
2017	The Message	"Jazba Chahiye"	Satya Manik Afsar	
2017	Tubelight	''Kuch Nahi''	Pritam	
2017	Viraam	"Mehki Mehki"	Siddhanth Madhav	
2018	Chal Jaa Bapu	"Mere Maula"	Rahul Bhat	
2018	Ishqeria	"Ishqeria"	Wasim Imraan	
2018	Kya Aashiqui Hai Humko Batao	"Hey Sai Ram"	Dr Vijay Bhave	
2018	Laila Majnu	"Tum"(Version ll)	Niladri Kumar	
2018	Meri Nimmo	"Tumse Hi"	Mangesh Dhakde	
2018	Nanu Ki Jaanu	"Jai Mata Di"	Sajid–Wajid	
2018	Turning Point	"Rang Rasiya"	Shivram	Palak Muchhal
2018	TVF's Yeh Meri Family	"Mere Mehram"	Simran Hora	Web Series
2018	Veerey Ki Wedding	"Na Kasoor"	Farzan Faaiz	
2019	Bagpat Ka Dulha	"Bagpat Ka Dulha"	Vishnu Vikram, Chandan Saxena	
2019	Battalion 609	"Khoya Rahu Tuzme"	Shailendra Sayanti	
2019	Dabangg 3	"Naina Lade"	Sajid–Wajid	
2019	Dosti Zindabad	"Ore Piya"	Sachin Anand	
2019	Jai Chhathi Maa	"Aisi Aankhein"	Nayan Mani Barman	Madhushree
2019	Kalank	"Aira Gaira"	Pritam	Antara Mitra, Tushar Joshi
2019	Kalank	"Aira Gaira"(Extended)	Pritam	Antara Mitra, Tushar Joshi
2019	Masoom	"Guzarish"	Gufy	Rehana Singh
2019	Phir Ussi Mod Par	"Sehmi Sehmi Hai"	Trinetra Bajpai	
2019	Phir Ussi Mod Par	"Yeh Zindagi Ek"	Trinetra Bajpai	
2019	Phir Ussi Mod Par	"Apni Zulphon Ko"	Trinetra Bajpai	
2019	Phir Ussi Mod Par	"Aye Mere Dil"	Trinetra Bajpai	
2019	Phir Ussi Mod Par	"Aye Mere"(Duet)	Trinetra Bajpai	
2019	Phir Ussi Mod Par	"Rakh Le Uska"	Trinetra Bajpai	
2019	PM Narendra Modi	"Junoon"	Hitesh Modak	
2019	Yeh Hai India	"Saiyan"	Raja Hasan	
2019	Yeh Hai India	"Piya Bin"(Male)	Raja Hasan	
2020	Bandish Bandits	"Lab Par Aaye"	Hardik Bhardwaj	Web Series
2020	Bhangra Paa Le	"Angana"	Ana Rehman	Shreya Ghoshal
2020	Careless	"Yadon Ka Anjuman"	Baba Jagirdar	
2020	English Ki Taay Taay Fisss	"Kya Khub Lage"	Sandeepshri	
2020	It's My Life	"Khamosh Tanhaiyon"	Shankar–Ehsaan–Loy	Hamsika Iyer
2020	Khuda Haafiz	"Khuda Haafiz"	Mithoon	
2020	Namumkin Tere Bin Jeena	"Tujhse Mil Kar"	Monty Sharma	
2020	Sadak 2	"Ishq Kamaal"	Suniljeet	
2020	Three Sisters And A Dream	"Hey Ri Chiraiyan"	Rohan Deo Pathak	
2021	Annabelle Rathore	"Deere Chal"	Krishna Kishor	Chinmayi
2021	Dilli Kaand	"Pahli Baarish"	Shashank Ranjan	
2021	Fiza Mein Tapish	"Aye Zindagi"	Raj Ali	
2021	Haathi Mere Saathi	"Ae Hawa"	Shantanu Moitra	
2021	Online Pyar	"Pass Aao Jara"	Nitin Shankar	Shreya Ghoshal
2021	Pushpa: The Rise	"Srivalli"	Devi Sri Prasad	
2021	Tadap	"Tu Mera Hogaya Hai"	Pritam	
2022	777 Charlie	"Theher Jaa"	Nobin Paul	
2022	Bal Naren	"Bedhadak"	Manish Sahriya	
2022	Banaras	"Ghazalon Ki Tarah"	B. Ajaneesh Loknath	Bela Shende
2022	Brahmāstra	"Shiva Theme"	Pritam	
2022	Cinema Zindabad	"Ishq"	Amit Sharad Trivedi	
2022	Dhoop Chhaon	"Ishq Da Rog"	Dushyanth Kumar, Amitabh Kumar, Meenu Kumari	
2022	Double XL	"Tumse Mila Doon"	Sohail Sen	
2022	Heropanti 2	"Jalwanuma"	A. R. Rahman	Pooja Tiwari
2022	Ishq Pashmina	"Jogi Ho Gaya"	Shashwat Prabhakar Bharadwaj, Arvind Pandey	
2022	Janhit Mein Jaari	"Parda Daari"	Prini Sidhant Madhav	Dhvani Bhanushali
2022	Jersey	"Jind Meriye"	Sachet-Parampara	
2022	Kartoot	"Zindagi Ke Rang"	Anisadh	Sadhana Sargam
2022	Kartoot	"Ab Jo Teri Khushi"	Anisadh	Sadhana Sargam
2022	Major	"Saathiya"	Sricharan Pakala	Sricharan Pakala
2022	Mudhal Nee Mudivum Nee	"Zindagi"	Darbuka Siva	
2022	Raajahyog	"Let's Go Party"	M. M. Srilekha	
2022	Shadow Assassins	"Aas Ka Sooraj"	Ashu Chakraborty	
2022	Subway	"Piya Re Piya"	Harshraj Harsh	Palak Muchhal
2022	Token The Treasure	"Pyaar Karenge"	Dilip Sen	
2022	Uunchai	"Savera"	Amit Trivedi	
2023	Mrs. Chatterjee vs Norway	"Maa Ke Dil Se"	Amit Trivedi	Dipakshi Kalita
2023	Shaakuntalam	"Yelelo Yelelo"	Mani Sharma	
2023	Auhaam	"Ishqbani"	Vijay Varma	
2023	Music School	"Teri Nigaahon"	Ilaiyaraaja	Shreya Ghoshal
2023	Initial D - Chapter 1	Woh Kashish	Sanjeev - Darshan	Anweshaa
2023	Bholaa	"Nazar Lag Jayegi"	Ravi Basrur	
2023	Welcome to Kashmir	"Iltija"	Tariq Bhat	Ishfaq Kawa
2023	8 A.M. Metro	"Woh Khuda"	Mark K Robin	
2023	1920: Horrors of the Heart	"Zaroori Hai"	Puneeth Dixit	Palak Muchchal
2023	Taali	"Gaurai Aali"	Amitraj	
2023	Love Nation	"Aankhon Mein"	Manoj Nayan	
2023	Love Nation	"Jai Jai Hind"	Manoj Nayan	
2023	Ajmer 92	"Ishq Toh Ishq"	Parthasakha Daskabi	
2023	Dark Darling	Kya Kaam Ka	Vishal Mishra	
2023	Kushi	"Tu Meri Roja"	Hesham Abdul Wahab	
2023	Dono	"Mann Mauji"	Shankar–Ehsaan–Loy	Srinidhi Gatate
2023	The Purvanchal Files	"Ye Pal"	Somen Kutty Sarkar	Akriti Kakkar
2023	Ajab Tamasha	"Wo Pagli Si Ladki"	Satish Sharma	
2023	Pyaar Hai Toh Hai	"Yaha Ab Tera"	Bobby - Imran	
2023	Dunki	"Chal Ve Watna"	Pritam	
2023	Firefly	"Aashiqana Dil"	Sunny Inder	
2023	Daman	"Ekla Chale Re"	Gaurav Aanand	
2023	Raundal	"Aasman Pe Badal"	Harsshit Abhiraj	
2024	Captain Miller	"Tu Roshni"	G. V. Prakash Kumar	
2024	Hanu-Man	"Phoolon Mein Hai"	Gowra Hari	
2024	Zehan	"Aankhon Se Khuda"	Sudesh Dananjay	
2024	Imamdasta	"Maakhan Chor"	Vickey Prasad	
2024	Meri Maa Karma	"Meri Karma Mata"	Dev - Ashish	
2024	Bastar: The Naxal Story	"Vande Veeram"	Bhishak Jyoti	
2024	Ae Watan Mere Watan	"Dua E Azaadi"	Shashi Suman	
2024	Maidaan	"Mirza"	A. R. Rahman	Richa Sharma
2024	Maidaan	"Dil Nahi Todenge"	A. R. Rahman	
2024	Ameena	"Title Track"	Sujeet Kumar Sharma	
2024	Woh Bhi Din The	"Yeh Silsila"	Joi Barua	
2024	The Legacy Of Jineshwar	"Daras"	Vivian Richard	
2024	Kaam Chalu Hai	"Lai Bhaari"	Palash Muchhal	Palak Muchhal
2024	Pyar Ke Do Naam	"O Yaara"	Anjjan Bhattacharya	
2024	Pyar Ke Do Naam	"Zaroori Hai"	Shabbir Ahmed	
2024	Auron Mein Kahan Dum Tha	"Tuu"	M. M. Kreem	Sukhwinder Singh
2024	Mr. Celebrity (D)	"Tera Bina"	Vinod Yajamanya	
2024	The Greatest of All Time (D)	"Chhoti Chhoti Aankhen"	Yuvan Shankar Raja	Yuvan Shankar Raja, Javed Ali
2024	Martin (D)	"Dhadkano Main"	Mani Sharma	Palak Muchhal
2024	Pushpa 2: The Rule (D)	"Peelings"	Devi Sri Prasad	Madhubanti Bagchi
2025	Sarzameen	"Watna Ve"	Vishal Khurana K	Solo
2026	O'Romeo	"Aashiqon Ki Colony"	Vishal Bhardwaj	Madhubanti Bagchi
2026	Bhooth Bangla	"O Ri O Sanwariya"	Pritam	Shreya Ghoshal, Prithvi Gandharv

== Telugu film songs ==
Year	Film	Song	Composer(s)	Writer(s)	Co-artist(s)
2006	Dhoom 2	"My Name Is Ali"	Pritam	Rajashri Sudhakar	
2007	Allare Allari	"Lailalai Laila Lovelo"	Chakri	Kandikonda	Teena
2009	Ganesh	"Thanemando"	Mickey J. Meyer	Sirivennela Sitaramasastri	
2009	Sarvam	"Rekkalu Vache"	Yuvan Shankar Raja	Vennelakanti	Madhushree
2010	Komaram Puli	"Maham Maye"	A. R. Rahman	Chandrabose	Suchitra
2010	Robo	"Kilimanjaro"	A. R. Rahman	Bhuvana Chandra	Chinmayi
2011	Bejawada	"Adagaku Nannemi"	Bapi - Tutul	Kaluva Sai	Chandreye Bhattacharya
2011	Bejawada	"Ninnu Choosina"	Amar Mohile	Kaluva Sai	Shweta Pandit
2011	LBW	"Megham"	Anil	Krishna Chinni	
2011	LBW	"Theeraale"	Anil	Krishna Chinni	Ramya NSK
2011	Sakthi	"Surro Surra"	Mani Sharma	Ramajogayya Sastry	Suchitra
2011	Seema Tapakai	"Aakashamlo"	Vandemataram Srinivas	Veturi	Sravana Bhargavi
2011	Teen Maar	"Gelupu Thalupule"	Mani Sharma	Rahman	
2011	Wanted	"Evo Pichi Veshalu"	Chakri	Bhaskarabhatla	
2012	Brothers	"Kommalanni Puvvai"	Harris Jayaraj	Vanamali	Mahalakshmi Iyer
2012	Nippu	"Alibaba"	Thaman S	Viswa	
2012	Sarocharu	"Racha Rambola"	Devi Sri Prasad	Sri Mani	Rita Thyagarajan
2012	Snehitudu	"Ileana Chitti"	Harris Jayaraj	Ramajogayya Sastry	Sayonara, Vijay Prakash
2012	Thuppakki	"Alaika Laika"	Harris Jayaraj	Kandikonda	Sharmila
2013	Bad Boy	"Rayya Rayya"	Devi Sri Prasad	Anantha Sriram	Ranina Reddy
2013	Jagan Nirdoshi	"Kallu Kallu"	Amar Mohile		Geetha Madhuri
2013	Jagan Nirdoshi	"Ammaye"	Amar Mohile		
2014	Alludu Seenu	"Ori Devudo"	Devi Sri Prasad	Chandrabose	Suchitra
2014	Galipatam	"Tere Mere Saath"	Bheems Ceciroleo	Bhaskarabhatla	Shreya Ghoshal
2014	Govindudu Andarivadele	"Gulabi Kallu Rendu"	Yuvan Shankar Raja	Sri Mani	
2014	Nuvve Naa Bangaram	"Sudilanti Pilla"	Vinod Yajamanya	Anantha Sriram	
2014	Oka Laila Kosam	"O Meri Jane Jana"	Anup Rubens	Sri Mani	
2015	Bajirao Mastani	"Naatho Mukha"	Sanjay Leela Bhansali	Ramajogayya Sastry	
2015	Janda Pai Kapiraju	"Inthandanga"	G. V. Prakash Kumar	Ramajogayya Sastry	Shashaa Tirupati
2015	Puli	"Jingiliya"	Devi Sri Prasad	Ramajogayya Sastry	A V Pooja
2015	S/O Satyamurthy	"Vaachadu"	Devi Sri Prasad		
2017	Nenu Local	"Side Please"	Devi Sri Prasad	Sri Mani	
2017	Rarandoi Veduka Chudham	"Thakita Thakajham"	Devi Sri Prasad	Sri Mani	
2017	Rarandoi Veduka Chudham	"Thakita Thakajham"(Rock)	Devi Sri Prasad	Sri Mani	
2017	Si3	"O Sone Sone"	Harris Jayaraj	Vennelakanti	Priya Subramaniyan
2019	Bandobasth	"Palike Palike"	Harris Jayaraj	Chandrabose	Darshana KT, Pravin
2019	Dabangg 3	"Nee Kallu Sankelluga"	Sajid–Wajid	Chandrabose	
2021	Alludu Adhurs	"Padipoya"	Devi Sri Prasad	Bhaskarabhatla	
2021	Aranya	"Hrudhayame"	Shantanu Moitra	Vanamali	
2021	Uppena	"Nee Kannu Neeli"	Devi Sri Prasad	Sri Mani, Raquib Alam	Srikanth Chandra
2022	2020 Golmaal	"Inthalo Yennenni"	Kanishka	Purna Chary	
2022	Alluri	"Seetha Nuvve"	Harshavardhan Rameshwar	Rambabu Gosala	Sathya Yamini
2022	Gandharwa	"Ellipoke Saavariya"	Rap Rock Shakeel	Apsar	Moushmi Neha
2022	Induvadana	"Vadi Vadiga"	Siva Kakani	Tirupathi Javana	Malavika
2022	Itlu Maredumilli Prajaneekam	"Lachchimi"	Sricharan Pakala	Sri Mani	
2022	Itlu Maredumilli Prajaneekam	"Kolo Kolo Koyila"	Sricharan Pakala	Kasarla Shyam	Mohana Bhogaraju, Yamini Ghantasala
2022	Leharaayi	"Guppedantha"	Ghantadi Krishna	Ramajogayya Sastry	
2022	Pshyco Varma	"Manase Pichchidhi"	Ravi Shankar	Rambabu Gosala	
2022	Ranga Ranga Vaibhavanga	"Siri Siri Muvvallona"	Devi Sri Prasad	Sri Mani	Shreya Ghoshal
2022	Rahashya	"Mancham"	Charan Arjun		
2023	Kalakaar	"Vendi Therallo"	Kanishka	JB Lakshman Ganga	
2023	Prathyardhi	"Nee Kannulalo"	Prini Siddhanth Madhav	Suresh Gangula	
2023	Music School	"Evo Saraagaalu"	Ilaiyaraaja	Rahman	Shreya Ghoshal
2023	Ahimsa	"Vundhiley Vundhiley"	R. P. Patnaik	Chandrabose	Jayashri
2023	O Saathiya	"O Saathiya"	Vinod Kumar	Bhaskarabhatla	
2023	Natho Nenu	"Osinee Vayyari"	Sathya Kashyap	Ramajogayya Sastry	
2023	Nachinavaadu	"Kadhile Kaalam"	Mejo Joseph	Harshavardhan Reddy	
2023	Nachinavaadu	"Ee Kaalame"	Mejo Joseph	Harshavardhan Reddy	
2023	Ala Ninnu Cheri	"Koddi Koddiga"	Subhash Anand	Chandrabose	
2023	Atharva	"Ringa Ringa Rosey"	Sricharan Pakala	Kittu Vissapragada	
2023	Bubblegum	"Jaanu"	Sricharan Pakala	Anantha Sriram	
2024	Captain Miller	"Kree Needale"	G. V. Prakash Kumar	Rakendu Mouli	
2024	Game On	"Nee Oose Nee Dhyase"	Nawab Gang	Feroz Israel	Harika Narayan
2024	Sundaram Master	"Egise"	Sricharan Pakala	Vanamali	
2024	Lambasingi	"Vayyari Godari"	R R Dhruvan	Kasarla Shyam	
2024	Haddhu Ledhu Raa	"Konte Kallu"	Kamla Kumar D	Rambabu Goshala	
2024	Mercy Killing	"Muddha Banthi Puvvulaa"	ML Raja		
2024	Darshini	"Andhamaa"	Nizani Anjan	Chiranjeevi, Arvind Chebolu	Sunitha
2024	Vidya Vasula Aham	"Happy Ga Jolly Ga"	Kalyani Malik	Bhaskarabhatla	
2024	Selfish	"Dil Kush"	Mickey J. Meyer	Ramajogayya Sastry	
2024	11:11	"Oh Chinni Navvu"	Mani Sharma	Lakshmi Bhoopal	Chinmayi
2024	Alanaati Ramchandrudu	"Brahmhaandam Antha"	Shashank Tirupathi		
2024	Padmavyuham Lo Chakradhaari	"Suvvi Suvvi"	Vinod Yajamanya	Purna Chary	
2024	Rewind	"Love You Nanna"	Ashirvad Luke	Ravi Varma Akula	
2024	Mr. Celebrity	"Nee Jathaga"	Vinod Yajamanya	Ganesh	
2024	Drinker Sai	"Bhagi Bhagi"	Sri Vasanth	Chandrabose	
2025	Thandel	"Bujji Thalli"	Devi Sri Prasad	Sri Mani	
2025	Thandel	"Bujji Thalli" (Sad Version)	Devi Sri Prasad	Sri Mani	
2025	Jack	"Kiss"	Suresh Bobbili	Sanare	Amala Chebolu
2025	Krishna Leela	"Kathalo Nuvvele"	Bheems Ceciroleo	Bhaskarabhatla	
2025	Kishkindhapuri	"Undipove Naathone"	Chaitan Bharadwaj	Purna Chary	
2026	Madrasi Gang	"Nishi Paanupu"	NS Prasu	Ramadurgam	
2026	Chennai Love Story	"Vadhalane"	Mani Sharma	Anantha Sriram	
2026	Adhey Neevu Adhey Nenu	"Manasa Manasa"	Kanishka	Purnachary	
2026	Bhagavanthudu	"Sittharala Navvu"	S. Krishna Prasaad	G. G. Vihari	
2026	Missing Meghana	"Pilla Pilla"	RR Dhruvan		

=== Non-film songs ===
Year	Album	Song	Composer(s)	Writer(s)	Co-artist(s)
2021	Private Album	"Yesayya Nee Prema"	Pranam Kamalakar	Joshu Shaik	
2022	Sambaralu 4	"Mattiliona Muthyam"	Pranam Kamalakar	Joshu Shaik	
2022	Sambaralu 5	"Yelo Yelo"	Pranam Kamalakar	Joshu Shaik	
2023	Sambaralu 6	"Aakaasha Veedhullo"(Male)	Pranam Kamalakar	Joshu Shaik	
2023	Sambaralu 6	"Aakaasha Veedhullo"(Duet)	Pranam Kamalakar	Joshu Shaik	Anweshaa
2024	Private Album Song	"Dhinna Dhinna"	Suhit Abhyankar	Lakshmi Priyanka	
2025	Sambaralu 8	"Rajadhi Raju"	Pranam Kamalakar	Joshua Shaik	

== Bengali film songs ==
Year	Film	Song	Music Director	Co-singer(s)
2008	Chirosathi	"Koto Swapno Dekhe Noyon"	Ashok Raj	Alka Yagnik
2008	Chirosathi	"Ei Neel Dhrubotara"	Ashok Raj	Alka Yagnik
2008	Chirosathi	"Na Na Na Pagol Korona"	Ashok Raj	Gautam Sushmit
2008	Partner	"Aaj Ei Aktu Kache"	Ashok Raj	Alka Yagnik
2009	Hanshi Khushi Club	"Cholo Na Jayee"	Shankha Bandyopadhyay	Debjani Dutta
2009	Hanshi Khushi Club	"Mono Pakhi"(Version l)	Shankha Bandyopadhyay	
2009	Love Story	"Raat Jaga Duti Chokhe"	Shubhayu	Kuntal Banerjee, Jeniva Roy
2009	Love Story	"Pashan Ei Duniya"	Shubhayu	Amrita Kak
2009	Rajdrohi	"Dekhlam Dekhar Por"	Babul Bose	Anwesha Dutta Gupta
2009	Krodh	"Bhalobasha Dile"		Sadhana Sargam
2009	Krodh	"Oi Biyer Shanai"		Sneha Pant
2009	Lakshyabhed	"O Diyal Emon Hoy Keno"	Kalyan Sen Bharat	solo
2009	Maa Amar Maa	"Bhalobasha" (duet)	Ashok Raj	Alka Yagnik
2009	Maa Amar Maa	"Moner Kotha" (duet)	Ashok Raj	Alka Yagnik
2009	Maa Amar Maa	"Jononi Amar"	Ashok Raj	solo
2010	Joy Baba Bholenath	"Jano Na Jano Na"	Ashok Bhadra	
2010	Paapi	"Koto Kothai Bhalobasha"	Raj Mukherjee	Sadhana Sargam
2010	Path Jodi Na Shesh Hoy	"I Love You"	Rocket Mondal	June Banerjee
2010	Path Jodi Na Shesh Hoy	"Confusion"	Rocket Mondal	solo
2010	Shedin Dekha Hoyechilo	"Hetechi Swapner"	Jeet Gannguli	June Banerjee
2011	Shotru	"Oh Baul Mon"	Indraadip Dasgupta	Monali Thakur, Soham
2011	Shotru	"Rakhe Hori"	Indraadip Dasgupta	
2011	Achena Prem	"Tomake Bhebe Mon"	Ashok Bhadra	Anwesha Dutta Gupta
2011	Achena Prem	"O Mon Amar" (solo)	Ashok Bhadra	
2011	Mone Mone Bhalobasha	"Amar Sonargao"	Babul Bose	Sneha Pant
2011	Murder	"Sagor Jodi Daake"		Madhushree
2011	Piya Tumi	"Mishti Rode" (duet)		Alka Yagnik
2011	Piya Tumi	"Mishti Rode" (male)		solo
2011	Tomay Bhalobashi	"Tomay Bhalobashi"		Sadhana Sargam
2012	Gundaraj	"Jodi Tomake Na Dekhi"	Jolly Mukherjee	
2012	Ki Kore Bojhabo Tomake	"Tumi Je Aamari"	Ashok Bhadra	
2012	Passport	"Mone Ki Jantrana"	Subhayu Bedajna	
2012	Premleela	"Saathi Re Saathi"	Kishore Chatterjee	solo
2012	A Shudhu Amar Gaan	"Bhalo Basa"	Sandipan Ganguly	Janiva Roy
2012	A Shudhu Amar Gaan	"Jatadin Banchbo"	Sandipan Ganguly	Janiva Roy
2013	Final Mission	"Andho Samaje"	Hriju Roy Chowdhury	
2013	Golemale Pirit Koro Na	"Elo Re Elo Prem"	Akassh	Nilakshi Bhattacharya
2013	Golemale Pirit Koro Na	"Baby I Miss You"	Akassh	Nilakshi Bhattacharya
2013	Kagojer Nouka	"Andhokare Poth Je Harai"(Male)	Sancheta	solo
2013	Kagojer Nouka	"Andhokare Poth Je Harai"(Duet)	Sancheta	Sanchita
2013	Megh Roddur	"Bole Mon"	Rishi Chanda	Anweshaa
2014	Game	"Game (Title Track)"	Jeet Gannguli	
2015	Love In Rajasthan	"Brishtite Dujone Mile"	Babul Bose	Anwesha Dutta Gupta
2015	Prime Tome	"Rasta Somantoral"	Surojit Chatterjee	Solo
2016	Sangabora	"Mon Diyechi To Kothay"	Raja Narayan Deb	Shreya Ghoshal
2017	Biporjoy	"Yaad Piya Ki Aaye"	Abhishek	
2018	Ken The Super Hero	"Mahia"	Sanjib Sarkar	
2019	Dotara	"Tomake Tomakei"	Shanku Mitra	
2019	Lime N Light	"Khamoshiyan"		Anweshaa
2019	Oriplast Originals	"Eh Shomoy"	Subhadeep Mitra	Nikhita Gandhi
2022	Raavan	"Ami Tor"	Savvy	Antara Mitra
2023	Fatafati	"Jotodur Tumi"	Amit Chatterjee	
2023	Kurban	"Dur Dur"	Raja Narayan Deb	
2023	Kabuliwala	"Khushi Ki Eid"	Indraadip Dasgupta	Ishan Mitra

Jamai Raja (Prosenjit Chatterjee)

== Bhojpuri film songs ==
Denotes films that have not yet been released

Year	Film	Song	Music Director	Co-singer(s)
2020	Badrinath	"Dil Se Duya Ba Khush Rahiha Ye Jaan"		Solo
2022	MLA Darji	"E Kawna Devta Ke Karigari Ha"	Sahil Khan	Ritu Pathak

== Malayalam film songs ==
Denotes films that have not yet been released

Year	Film	Song	Music Director	Co-singer(s)
2014	Gangster	"Allahu Akbar"	Deepak Dev	
2019	Mera Naam Shaji	"Marhaba"	Emil Muhammed	

== Kannada film songs ==
Year	Film	Song	Music Director	Co-singer(s)
2009	House Full	"Neeli Nayanadi"	Kiran	
2010	Shourya	"Nee Ishtu Chennagidire"	Sadhu Kokila	
2010	Varshadhare	"Keli Ee Preethiganta"	B. Ajaneesh Loknath	
2012	Chingaari	"Gamanava"	V. Harikrishna	Shreya Ghoshal
2012	Alemaari	"Neeli Neeli"	Arjun Janya	Shreya Ghoshal
2012	Alemaari	"Neeli Neeli"(Pathos)	Arjun Janya	Shreya Ghoshal
2012	Dev Son of Mudde Gowda	"Dil Se"	Dharma Vish	
2014	Moda Modala Mathu Chenda	"Gothe Illa"	SP Chandrakanth	
2015	Preeti Kitaabu	"Eneno Nenapanu"	V. Manohar	
2016	Shivalinga	"Upakaara"	V. Harikrishna	
2016	Run Anthony	"Summane"	Manikanth Kadri	
2016	Luv U Alia	"Sanjeveleli"	Jassie Gift	
2016	Santheyalli Nintha Kabira	"Vishwasadalli"	Ismail Darbar	
2017	Rang Rangda Dibbana	"Pacche Kuralda"	S P Chandrakanth	
2023	Utsava	"Sihiyaada Sundariye"	Emil	
2024	Mr. Celebrity (D)	"Ninna Jhothe"	Vinod Yajamanya	

== Odia film songs ==
Year	Film	Song	Music Director	Co-singer(s)
2011	Most wanted	"Chati tale thae Jane luchi"	Goodly Rath	
2012 2013	Balunga Toka Ashok Samrat	"Why For I Do Feel You" "I Love you Honey "	Goodly Rath	
2016	Sweet Heart	"Sweet Heart Title song"		
2016	God Father (2016 film)	Yebe Mo Bina	Abhijit Majumdar	Nirmal Nayak

== Tamil film songs ==
Year	Film	Songs	Composer	Co-singer(s)
2004	Aai	"Neathi Adida Aai"	Srikanth Deva	Palakkad Sreeram, Gopal Sharma, Kumar, Suchitra
2006	Dhoom 2	"My Name Is Ali"	Pritam	
2009	Naan Avanillai 2	"Naangu Kangal"	D. Imman	Shreya Ghoshal
2009	Muthirai	"Uyire Uyire"	Yuvan Shankar Raja	Madhushree
2009	Vaamanan	"Yedho Seigiraai"	Yuvan Shankar Raja	Sowmya Raoh
2009	Kunguma Poovum Konjum Puravum	"Chinnan Sirisuga"	Yuvan Shankar Raja	Bela Shende
2009	Sarvam	"Siragugal"	Yuvan Shankar Raja	Madhushree
2010	Naan Mahaan Alla	"Oru Maalai Neram"	Yuvan Shankar Raja	Shilpa Rao
2010	Thambikku Indha Ooru	"Mudhal Pen Niyae"	Dharan Kumar	Sindhu
2010	Enthiran	"Kilimanjaro"	A. R. Rahman	Chinmayi
2011	Rajapattai	"Paniye Panipoove"	Yuvan Shankar Raja	Renu
2012	Nanban	"Irukkaannaa"	Harris Jayaraj	Vijay Prakash, Sunidhi Chauhan
2012	Thadaiyara Thaakka	"Kalangal"	S. Thaman	Chinmayi
2012	Manam Kothi Paravai	"Po Po Po"	D. Imman	
2012	Maattrraan	"Kaal Mulaitha Poove"	Harris Jayaraj	Mahalakshmi Iyer, Nincy Vincent
2012	Thuppakki	"Alaikaa Laikaa"	Harris Jayaraj	Sayanora Philip, Sharmila
2012	Aadhalal Kadhal Seiveer	"Thappu Thanda"	Yuvan Shankar Raja	Bhavatharini
2012	Alex Pandian	"Rayya Rayya"	Devi Sri Prasad	Ranina Reddy
2012	Nanda Nanditha	"En Idhayam"	Emil Mohammed	Sangeetha
2013	Ambikapathy	"Oliyaaga Vandhaai"	A. R. Rahman	K.M.M.C. Sufi Ensemble
2013	Maryan	"Sonapareeya"	A. R. Rahman	Haricharan, Nakash Aziz
2013	Singam II	"Kannukulle"	Devi Sri Prasad	Priya Himesh
2013	All in All Azhagu Raja	"Ore Oru"	S. Thaman	
2014	Nimirndhu Nil	"Kadhal Nergayil"	G. V. Prakash Kumar	G. V. Prakash Kumar, Shashaa Tirupati
2014	Kerala Nattilam Pengaludane	"Aangalai Nambathe"	S. S. Kumaran	
2014	Arima Nambi	"Edhayam En Edhayam"	Anandan Sivamani	
2015	Puli	"Jingiliya"	Devi Sri Prasad	Pooja AV
2015	Bajirao Mastani	"Praarthanai"	Sanjay Leela Bhansali	
2016	Pencil	"Kangalilae"	G. V. Prakash Kumar	Shreya Ghoshal
2016	Uyire Uyire	"Listen to My Heart"	Aravind - Shankar	Jaya Prada
2017	S3	"O Sone Sone"	Harris Jayaraj	Priya Subramaniyan, MC Vickey
2017	Indrajith	"Vidigira Vaanil"	KP	
2018	Achamillai Achamillai	"Mazhai Kondu Vantha"	Muthu Gopal	
2019	Kaappaan	"Kurilae Kurilae"	Harris Jayaraj	Darshana KT
2019	Neeya 2	"Maya Maya"	Shabir Sulthan	Shashaa Tirupati
2021	Kaadan	"Idhayame"	Shantanu Moitra	
2022	The Legend	"Kone Komaane"	Harris Jayaraj	Chandana Bala Kalyan
2022	DSP	"Venam Thalaiva"	D. Imman	
2022	Ranga	"Yaar Rab"	Ramjeevan	
2023	Music School	"Eno En Padal"	Ilaiyaraaja	Shreya Ghoshal
2024	Mr. Celebrity (D)	"Naan Undhan"	Vinod Yajamanya	Suresh Jithan
2025	Nesippaya	"Nesippaya Nee Ennai"	Yuvan Shankar Raja	Bela Shende
2025	Sotta Sotta Nanaiyuthu	"Golugappa"	Renjith Unni	Sivaangi Krishnakumar
2026	Madrasi Gang	"Medhu Medhuvai"	NS Prasu	

=== Tamil Non-film songs ===
Year	Album	Song	Composer(s)	Co-artist(s)
2015	Private Album	"Kannaley"	E R Azhar Kaashif	Sharanya Srinivas
2023	Sweet Kaaram Coffee (TV Series)	"Udna Hai" (Hindi Song)	Govind Vasantha	
2024	Album Song	"Dhinna Dhinna"	Suhit Abhyankar	

== Gujarati film songs ==
Year	Film	Song name	Composer	Co-singer(s)
2015	Bas Ek Chance	"Lagi Re Lagan"	Pranav, Nikhil, Shailesh	Aishwarya Majmudar
2015	Romance Complicated	"Thumko Dilli No"	Jatin-Pratik	Aishwarya Majmudar
2016	Shootout	"Bhini Bhini"	Jatin, Prathik	
2016	Shootout	"Naseeb Che"	Jatin, Prathik	
2017	Carry On Kesar	"Meghdhanush Tu Haiya"	Sachin–Jigar	
2018	Aavuj Reshe	"Pyar Wali Ringtone"	Nikhil, Pranav, Shailesh	
2018	Family Circus	"Tuti Tuti Re Sargam"	Hemang Dholakia	
2018	Mari Life Tari	"Aa Chhe Duniya"	Devrath Sharma	Solo
2018	Tension Thai Gayu	"Priye Tamaro Prem"	Bandish Vaz	
2018	Tension Thai Gayu	"Tension Thai Gayu"	Bandish Vaz	
2018	Tension Thai Gayu	"Tension Thai Gayu"(Sad)	Bandish Vaz	
2019	Mazza Ni Life	"Bachpan Ni Vaato"	Imran Raj	
2019	Mazza Ni Life	"Khwahishon"	Imran Raj	
2022	Dard	"Please Tame Maano"	Jitu Prajapati	Sadhana Sargam
2022	Jaysuk Zdpayo	"Ankho Ni Aare"	Kashyap Sompura	Palak Muchhal
2023	Nayika Devi	"Keva Malya Re"	Parth Bharath Thakkar	Antara Mitra
2023	Fuleku	"Kona Kona Naam"	Kaushal Mahavir	

== Marathi film songs ==
Year	Film	Song name	Composer	Co-singer(s)
2010	Irada Pakka	"Kadhi Kadhi"	Nilesh Moharir	
2010	Irada Pakka	"Kadhi Kadhi"(Launge Mix)	Nilesh Moharir	
2011	Mohaan Aawatey	"Jadle Naate"	Aniruddha Kale	Neha Rajpal
2013	Asa Mee Ashi Tee	"Maula Maula"	Amitraj	Shilpa Pai
2014	Nati	"Hur Hur Hee"	Nikhil Mahamuni	
2014	Pyaar Vali Love Story	"Zara Zara"	Pankaj Padghan, Sameer Saptiskar & Amit Raj	Sayali Pankaj
2014	Pyaar Vali Love Story	"Zara Zara" (Male)	Pankaj Padghan, Sameer Saptiskar & Amit Raj	
2014	Pyaar Vali Love Story	"Zara Zara" (Unplugged)	Pankaj Padghan, Sameer Saptiskar & Amit Raj	Sayali Pankaj
2015	Lord Of Shingnapur	"Bali Umar"	Farhan Shaikh	Sadhana Sargam
2015	Mumbai-Pune-Mumbai 2	"Kaisi Ye Teri Preet"	Avinash-Vishwajeet	
2015	Nilkanth Master	"Paratun Ye Na"	Ajay-Atul	
2016	Bole India Jai Bhim	"Jai Bhim Jai Bhim"	Dinesh Arjuna	
2016	Prem Kahani EK Lapleli Ghoshta	"O Mhare Sajna"	Pravin Kunvar	Pamela Jain
2016	Shinhma Yeda	"Pachatap Chya"	Kiran Raj	
2017	Bandookya	"Aata Sosana"	Parikshit Bhadkande	
2017	Journey Premachi	"Tuch Tu"	Nikhil Kamat	
2017	Journey Premachi	"Journey Premchi"	Nikhil Kamat	Anee Chatterjee
2018	Memory Card	"Runa Zuna"	Mitesh Pritesh	Mahalakshmi Iyer
2018	Memory Card	"Laaj Watate"	Mitesh Pritesh	
2018	Odh	"Jo Dil Se Kisi Ko"	Pravin Kuwar	
2018	Re Raya	"Jau Kunikade"	Mangesh Dhakde	
2018	Truckbhar Swapna	"Dhadak Dhadak"	Shreyashh Angane	
2018	Vanilla Strawberry And Chocolate	"Kuthe Chalali"	Shantanu Nandan Herlekar	
2019	H2O	"Prem Hech Ka Rani"	Nikhil Vispute	Ketaki Mategaonkar
2019	H2O	"Aali Aali Tuzi Aathavan"	Nikhil Vispute	Ketaki Mategaonkar
2019	Judgement	"Yalgaar"	Naval Sastri	
2019	Rocky	"Manguz"	Emraan Wasim	Palak Muchhal
2019	Whatsapp Love	"Shona Re"	Nitin Shankar	
2019	Whatsapp Love	"Jawal Ye Na"	Nitin Shankar	Shreya Ghoshal
2021	Email Female	"Swapn Maze"	Abhijeet Narvekar	
2021	Jayanti	"Tula Kaay Sangu"	Ruhi	Senjuti Das
2021	Jayanti	"Tula Vandhyanchi"	Ruhi	
2022	Story Of Laagir	"Zalaya Laagir"	Sunny - Sushant	
2022	Mi Udanchhoo	"Mi Udanchhoo"	Prashant Nakti	Sonali Sonawane
2022	Rashtra	"Deva Deva"	Inderpal Singh	
2023	Raundal	"Dhagan Aabhal"	Harsshit Abhiraj	Vaishali Mhade
2023	Gettogether	"Abhas Ki Bhas Ha"	Ajay Ranpise	
2023	Musandi	"Dhoka Dila"	Sachin Awaghade	
2023	Aadharwad	"Tujhya Deewangi La"	Amar Desai	Sonali Patel
2024	Kaasra	"Feel Wala Ishq"	Prashanth Nakthi	Sonali Sonawane
2024	Google Aai	"Man Rangalay"	S Sagar	Savani Ravindra
2024	Gharat Ganpati	"Ganpati Aale"	Sanket sane	Solo
2024	Man Yedyagat Zal	"Man Yedyagat Zal"	Nilesh Patange	Solo
2024	Yek Number	"Tu Abhaal"	Kunal Karan	Ravindra Khomne
2025	Mission Ayodhya	"Ramraya"	S. D. Sadguru	
2026	Aga Aga Sunbai! Kay Mhantay Sasubai?	"Nakahatranche Dene"	Kunal Karan; Devdutta Baji; Suraj Dhiraj	Solo
2026	Tula Pahata	"Sparsh Nave"	Rohan-Rohan	Aarya Ambekar

== Punjabi film songs ==
Year	Song name	Film	Composer	Co-singer(s)
2012	Wade Akhan Sachiyan De	Rahe Chardi Kala Punjab Di		Jaspinder Narula
2012	Eko Takya Sahara	Rahe Chardi Kala Punjab Di		
2013	Rataan Lamiyaan	Best of Luck	Jatinder Shah	

== Urdu film songs ==
Year	Film	Song	Language	Music Director	Co-singer(s)
2014	The System	"Aa Re Aa"	Shailesh Suwarna		

== Nepali film songs ==
Year	Film	Song	Language	Music Director	Co-singer(s)
2010	Parkhirakha Hai	"Timilai Dekhne Manchhe" (part 2)	Suresh Ashikari, Prem Dhoj Pradhan	solo	

== Albums ==
Year	Album	Record label
2006	Shaan Unki Hai Badi	Super Cassettes Industries Ltd
2006	Khwaja Pyare Teri Dhoom	Super Cassettes Industries Ltd
2011	Punjabi Tadka	Hamara Music
2011	Dil Ki Baatein	Venus Records and Tapes, Mumbai
2012	Yaara	Filmy BOX Interactive
2012	Love is in the Air (Song: Anahat)	Asha Audio and 92.7 BIG FM
2014	Ishqana	SRK Media Entertainment
2014	With Love...Javed Ali	Music Wires
2015	Javed Ali Telugu Hits	Aditya Music (India) Pvt Ltd
2016	Saaiyan	Times Music India
2017	Mor Raipur	Hribom
2022	Dil Farebi	Saregama Music
2022	Pehli Baar	T-Series

=== Marathi album songs ===
Year	Song	YouTube Channel	Composer(s)	Writer(s)	Co-singer(s)
2022	Mi Udanchhoo	Prashant Nakti Official	Prashant Nakti	Prashant Nakti	Sonali Sonawane

== Singles and music videos ==
Year	Single Song Name	Composer	Co-singer	Lyricist	Record label
2015	Fariyad Sun Fakira	Ramesh Roshan	Pankaj Kumar, Asha Bhosle	Minakshi Bhardwaj	
2017	Rangreziya	Javed Ali		Raqueeb Alam	Sony DADC
2018	Wirdd	Ayaz Ismail		Amin Vailgy	iThinkSound
2018	Toh Yeh Subah Nahi	Javed Ali		Raqueeb Alam	Sony DADC
2018	Nazar Na Lag Jaye (Recreated)	Laxmikant–Pyarelal		Anand Bakshi	Saregama India Ltd
2019	Jeet le Sari Duniya (Recreated)	Harsh K. Garg			Talk Fever Music Pvt. Ltd
2020	Ho Na Juda	Ayaz Ismail		Kunaal Vermaa	iThinkSound
2025	Tumm Se Tumm Tak	Nishant-Raja; Sunaad Gowtham		Deep Sharma	Zee Music Company
2026	Deewana Tera (OST. Oh Humnava Tum Dena Saath Mera)	Saif Ali		Shivam Mishra	The LSD Music
