= Om Allah =

- Directed by: Sameer Khan
- Written by: Faisal Saif; Sameer Khan
- Produced by: Aushim Khetarpal
- Cinematography: Karim Khatri
- Edited by: Ashutosh Anand Verma
- Music by: Surya Rajkamal
- Release date: 20 May 2012
- Country: India
- Language: Hindi

Om Allah is a 2012 Indian Hindi-language film directed by Sameer Khan who was once associate director to Faisal Saif. The film stars Pakistani actress Meera and Indian sports promoter turned anchor Aushim Khetarpal. It is said that this film revolves around the real life match fixing incident of Aushim Khetarpal.

== Synopsis ==
Ayesha Khan (Meera), A Pakistani Muslim journalist comes to India to work on a story of a Match Fixer Aushim Aushim Khetarpal who is now a Follower of Saibaba and is a Saint. Ayesha arrives in Mathura Vrindavan and is very uncomfortable with the Hindu Atmosphere. Somewhere inside, Ayesha is a little 'Fanatic'. How Ayesha is convinced to write the story of Aushim and follows his journey towards Spiritualism forms the whole film.

== Cast ==
- Meera as Ayesha Khan
- Aushim Khetarpal as Aushim
- Milind Gunaji as Saibaba
- Kavita Radheshyam as Kusum Ganga
- Kiran Kumar
- Tej Sapru
- Nasser Abdullah
- Upasna Singh
- Reema Lagoo
- Shahbaaz Khan
- Vishnu Datt Tiwari
