= Shraap 3D =

- Directed by: Faisal Saif
- Written by: Faisal Saif
- Produced by: Neelam Sharma
- Starring: See below
- Cinematography: Daya Shankar Singh; Sharath Kumar G
- Music by: Shibani Kashyap; Altaf Sayyed; Sheeba Khan; Apache Indian; DJ Ali Mustafa
- Production company: Neelam Sharma Entertainment
- Country: India
- Language: Hindi

Shraap 3D (English: Curse) is an upcoming Indian Bollywood horror film written and directed by Faisal Saif and produced by Neelam Sharma, under the Neelam Sharma Entertainment banner. The director of the film confirmed that the script of the film was written in both Hindi and Tamil languages.

== Plot ==
A CBI officer (Yadav) has an experience with a ghost (Radheshyam).

== Cast ==
- Rajpal Yadav
- Kavita Radheshyam
- Mythriya Gowda
- Nishant Pandey
- Dev Sharma
- Yashpal Sharma
- Asif Basra
- Aanjjan Srivastav
- Amita Nangia
- Himani Shivpuri
- Aryan Vaid
- Anupam Shyam
- Tracy Jona
- Pankaj Berry
- Karan Kashyap
- Payal Rohatgi As Nasha Mother

== Production ==
The principal photography of the film began in January 2016 and was released in February 2018, with Rajpal Yadav and Kavita Radheshyam starring. Controversial Kannada actress Mythriya Gowda was approached and picked over several other actresses to also star in the film.
