= Sabir Khan (musician) =

Indian musician

- Born: 26 January 1987 (age 39); Jodhpur, Rajasthan, India
- Genres: Indian classical music
- Years active: 1991–present

Sabir Khan is an Indian sarangi player and the son of sarangi player and vocalist Padma Bhushan Ustad Sultan Khan. He belongs to the Sikar gharana school of music.

== Early life ==
Khan was born in Jodhpur, Rajasthan to sarangi player and vocalist Padma Bhushan Ustad Sultan Khan. He trained under his father and his uncle Ustad Nasir Khan. He is the ninth generation to take up sarangi. His great-grandfather Ustad Azim Khan Sahab was a court musician in Sikar Rajasthan.

== Career ==
Khan performed with his father in concert and also solo. He has performed alongside artists such as Ustad Zakir Hussain, Pt. Kumar Bose, and Pt. Anindo Chatterjee.

He has played in feature films including Chameli, Rog, Dor, Anwar, Sanwariya, Chodon na yaar, Jodha Akbar, and Faisal Saif's Amma, a multilingual film.
