= Shridevi =

Shridevi, and similar terms, may refer to:

== Deities ==
- Dewi Sri, or Shridevi, Javanese, Sundanese, and Balinese Hindu goddess of rice and fertility
- Lakshmi, a Hindu deity
- Palden Lhamo, or Shri Devi, a tantric Buddhist goddess

== Film ==
- Sridevi (unreleased film), directed by J. D. Chakravarthy
- Sreedevi (film), an Indian Malayalam film

== Other uses ==
- Sridevi (Sridevi Kapoor, 1963–2018), Indian actress
- Shri devi, a species of dinosaur
