= Amma (unreleased film) =

- Directed by: Faisal Saif
- Written by: Faisal Saif; Ravindra A.R (Kannada Version Dialogues)
- Produced by: C. R. Manohar; C.R.Gopi
- Starring: Ragini Dwivedi; Prashant Narayanan; Rajpal Yadav
- Cinematography: Bharat.R.Parthsarthy; Vishal Gandhi
- Edited by: Ashutosh Anand Verma
- Music by: Ustad Sultan Khan; Sabir Khan; Nikhil Kamath
- Production company: Tanvi Films
- Country: India
- Languages: Hindi; Kannada

Amma is an unreleased multilingual Indian film written and directed by Faisal Saif, and produced by C. R. Manohar under the banner of Tanvi Films. Filmed in Hindi and Kannada, the film is Sandalwood star Ragini Dwivedi's second film to be launched on her birthday after Ragini IPS.

== Cast ==
- Ragini Dwivedi as Jaya
- Prashant Narayanan as C.B.I Officer Deven Bharti
- Rajpal Yadav as Radhe Krishna Yadav a.k.a. Doosri Radha
- Kavita Radheshyam as Shweta Khatri
- Pooja Misrra as Aruna Sharma
- Hamsa Prathap
- Gokul
- Aanjjan Srivastav as Minister Dhanaji Rao
- C.R Gopi as Inspector Raghavan Shastry
- Baby Dattashree as Paree

== Production and promotion ==
Director Faisal Saif launched the film at Om Shakti Temple Bengaluru on Ragini Dwivedi's birthday. Rajpal Yadav was signed for the main antagonist. Actress Roopa Nataraj, who rose to fame with Miss Mallige, was signed for the role of a cop but later replaced by Pooja Misrra. After filming her portions, Pooja Misrra also walked out of the film, creating controversy regarding her small role in the film. Actor Prashant Narayanan, of Murder 2 fame, was signed on to play the male lead in the film; he said: "I've always been picky about my films. What drew me to this was director Faisal Saif's script. It touches upon many aspects that are relevant to today's times".

During director Faisal Saif's creative sessions with veteran filmmaker Rituparno Ghosh while he was directing Chitrangada: The Crowning Wish in 2012, Saif discussed having a transgender antagonist dealing their gender identity with Ghosh, something which he later incorporated in this film. The character is played by Rajpal Yadav.

=== First look ===
The first look trailer and poster of the film has been released. A photo shoot was held in Mumbai where Ragini Dwivedi tested different looks for her character.

== Soundtrack ==
The music for Amma was credited to Ustad Sultan Khan, Sabir Khan and Nikhil Kamath.
