= Nanda Nanditha =

Nanda Nanditha may refer to:

- Nanda Nanditha (2008 film), Kannada language film
- Nanda Nanditha (2012 film), a remake of the 2008 film, in Tamil and Telugu languages

== See also ==
- Nandita (given name)
