= Main Hoon Part-Time Killer =

Main Hoon (Part-Time) Killer
- Directed by: Faisal Saif
- Written by: Faisal Saif
- Produced by: Mrs.Saroj
- Starring: Adithya Menon; Kavita Radheshyam
- Cinematography: Murzy Pagdiwala
- Edited by: Ashutosh Anand Verma
- Music by: Bappi Lahiri; Shibani Kashyap
- Distributed by: Dimension Pictures
- Release date: 22 May 2015
- Running time: 127 minutes
- Country: India
- Language: Hindi
- Budget: ₹80 lakh (US$83,000)

Main Hoon (Part-Time) Killer (transl. I am a part-time killer), initially titled Main Hoon Rajinikanth (transl. I am Rajinikanth) is a 2015 Indian Hindi-language spoof film written and directed by Faisal Saif and produced by Mrs. Saroj under the banner of Varsha Production House. The film marks the Bollywood début of South Indian actor Adithya Menon.

The film was initially to be released in 2014, but faced opposition and controversy when Indian actor Rajinikanth approached the Madras High Court to stop the film's release based upon the use of his screen name in the film's title. Business of Cinema categorised the film as one of the Top 10 banned films of Bollywood along with movies such as Bandit Queen, Black Friday, Kama Sutra: A Tale of Love and Kissa Kursi Ka.

After a lengthy court battle, filmmaker Saif finally changed the title due to the producer's pressure. It was released on 22 May 2015 across North India by Dimension Pictures. However, in South India it was not released to avoid further legal disputes.

== Story ==
The film tells the story of a funny and wicked C.B.I officer and contract killer Rajinikanth (Adithya Menon) who goes on a killing-spree for an undercover assignment from a stupid, funny and wicked millionaire Bachchan (Shakti Kapoor) to deliver ₹50 million (US$520,000) cash back to him which is captured by a corrupt cop Hariprasad Venkatesh Naidu (Shabbir Ali).

Things go awry when Naidu dies while making love to his beloved sex-worker Mallika (Kavita Radheshyam). Mallika, also a die-hard fan of Tamil superstar Rajinikanth, sees a golden opportunity to grab the bag full of money and run away. Mallika waits for a train back to her village Bhanpur at Hanumangarh Railway Station where Rajinikanth comes in search of her, intending to kill her and return the money to its rightful owner.

== Cast ==
- Adithya Menon as Rajinikanth
- Kavita Radheshyam as Mallika
- Shakti Kapoor as Bachchan
- Smita Gondkar as Madhu
- Sunil Pal as Arvind Mukherji The Khaas Aadmi
- Reema Lagoo as Reema Lagoo Type Mother
- Ganesh Yadav as Anna
- Mohnish Nawani as Bachchan's Brother
- Shabbir Ali as Hariprasad Venkatesh Naidu
- Sodhi Sultan as The Irritating Sleeping Man
- Sameer Khan as Manoj Golati
- Kumar Siddharth as The Condom Salesman

== Tribute ==
After incorrect speculation from some press and media, director Faisal Saif and actor Adithya Menon cleared the vibes of this film not being a biographical film on Rajinikanth, but a comedy spoof film and a tribute which will not hurt any sentiments or feelings of the superstar or his fans.

== Production ==
Director Faisal Saif announced his third comedy spoof film as a tribute to the living superstar and cultural icon of Tamil cinema Rajinikanth. Actress Kavita Radheshyam was approached and hired for the leading role alongside Adithya, which will be similar to the late Silk Smitha. Reema Lagoo was approached to play a Spoof on herself in the film which was later termed as a surprise appearance by the actress. Marathi cinema's controversial actress Smita Gondkar was approached and signed to play an important role.

== Controversy ==
On 17 September 2014, actor Rajinikanth moved the Madras High Court to stop the release and screening of this film, stating that various press releases, video releases, web articles, posters and information from other sources about this film revealed that the producer had lifted/exploited the super-hero image of Rajinikanth from various movies by including in the forthcoming feature film. The stay was granted, and the makers of the movie have been directed not use superstar's name/image/likeness. This was the second time for the actor to do so after Perumaan (Note: The film was initially titled Perumaan The Rajinikanth).

Director Faisal Saif, after filing counter to the case, denied the allegation about the film being a biopic on the star. He also stated he hasn't used any names/image/likeness/caricature and the case being filed on the film is baseless and done with lack of knowledge.

On 27 September 2014, Faisal Saif held a special screening at AVM Preview Theatre for Rajinikanth and stated, "We are holding a special screening of the film for Rajinikanth and Soundarya so that they may come to the right conclusion about my film not being based on Rajinikanth in any manner. The case filed by his lawyers against my film is absolutely baseless and it has been done with lack of knowledge and without seeing the content of my film."

On 3 February 2015, Madras High Court ruled in favour of Rajinikanth and restricted Faisal Saif from using the actor's name in his upcoming film. Saif, however, finally agreed to change his film's title.

== First-look poster ==
The first-look poster of the film was released in press and media. The Times of India stated, "The first poster succeeds in giving you that comical feeling".

== Soundtrack ==
Main Hoon Rajinikanth

Studio album by Bappi Lahiri, Basit Faryad, Leena Shah
- Genre: Feature film soundtrack
- Label: Worldwide Records

=== Track listing ===
No.	Title	Music	Singer(s)	Length
1.	"Kamliyaan (Tribute to the Legends)"	Leena Shah, Basit Faryad	Leena Shah, Basit Faryad	5:10
2.	"Yaar Mera"	Shibani Kashyap	Shibani Kashyap	5:00
3.	"Saathiya Aaj Mujhe Neend Nahin Aayegi"	Bappi Lahiri	Bappi Lahiri, Shreya Ghoshal, Sharon Prabhakar, Shakti Kapoor	4:50

== Release and reception ==
The makers changed the film's title to Main Hoon (Part-Time) Killer and planned to release the film on 24 April. But the film's release was delayed as the Madras high court ordered the Central Board of Film Certification of India to Re-Censor the film as it had direct references to Rajinikanth and his family. The film was later scheduled to be released alongside Anurag Kashyap's Bombay Velvet, but following Bollywood superstar Salman Khan's five-year prison sentence, Faisal Saif pushed the release a further week back, showing support for the star.

== Box office and critical reception ==
Despite a limited number of 100 screens in North India, the film managed to open 50% collections of the gross capacity across Mumbai, Maharashtra, Delhi and Rajasthan circuits and was positively received by critics such as Box Office Collections giving 3.5 out of 5 Stars and calling it "Main Hoon (Part-Time) Killer is better than Rajinikanth's Lingaa". Praising the director further, it said "Faisal Saif may not be an outstanding technician but he is surely the director who has made a good entertaining package which in the coming times will become a Cult". The Daily Star gave 3.5 out of 5 stars and indicated its cinematography and acting as its strengths.

== Legacy ==
- Filmmaker Ram Gopal Varma produced an erotic film titled Savitri which he later renamed as Sridevi for which actress Sridevi sent him a legal notice to change the movie's title. The maker, however refused to change the film's title.
- Another Telugu film, titled A Shyam Gopal Varma Film, was released in January 2015, which was termed as a Spoof film on Ram Gopal Varma. The film had actor Shafi playing the lead role.
- Tamil director N. Lingusamy produced a film Rajini Murugan, using the name of Rajinikanth in the title. He said to the media, "We'd chosen this title around the same time that the Main Hoon Rajinikanth controversy case was on. I called him (Rajinikanth) to explain why we'd used it, and he graciously asked us to go ahead with it,"
- A Comedy T.V Series on Life OK is titled Bahu Hamari Rajni Kant where the lead protagonist is a human robot.

== See also ==
- List of films banned in India
