= Circus (2009 film) =

- Directed by: Dayal Padmanabhan
- Written by: Dayal Padmanabhan; Shekhar Chandra; Manjunath Sanjeev (Dialogues)
- Produced by: Dayal Padmanabhan
- Starring: Ganesh; Archana Gupta
- Narrated by: Nagathihalli Chandrashekhar
- Cinematography: Shekar Chandra
- Edited by: Joni Harsha
- Music by: Emil Mohammed
- Production company: D Pictures
- Distributed by: Rockline Distributors
- Release date: 15 January 2009
- Running time: 148 minutes
- Country: India
- Language: Kannada

Circus is a 2009 Indian Kannada-language comedy thriller film written, directed and produced by Dayal Padmanabhan. It stars Ganesh and Archana Gupta in the lead roles. Avinash Bharadwaj, Mithra, Pawan Kumar and Murali appear in supporting roles. The film follows a group of mischievous friends whose harmless prank involving a bomb threat spirals into danger after they board a train to recover an incriminating letter.

Circus was released on 15 January 2009 and became an average venture at the box office. It received mixed reviews from critics.

== Plot ==
Priya boards the Gandhadagudi Express from Mysore to Bangalore after visiting her uncle and aunt in Mysore. As the train departs, she appears visibly sad. The train is also baorded by other suspicious-looking men travelling in the same coach. Just as the train departs, Dhanush and his four friends — Satya, Kitty, Karisubbu and Michael — run and board the train at the last moment. The story then shifts into a flashback.

Dhanush is an aspiring scientist living with his family in the railway colony in Mysore. He and his friends — Sathyaprakash, Krishnamurthy "Kitty", Karisubbu and Michael Fernandes — spend most of their time at the local railway station, often engaging in harmless pranks. In one such prank, they impersonate the personal assistant of the Union Railway Minister and falsely announce a surprise inspection, causing panic among railway staff. Later, three of the friends write an anonymous letter to the station master claiming that a bomb has been planted on a train. Unaware of this, Kitty ends up writing Dhanush's name as the sender. Realizing the possible criminal consequences, the friends desperately attempt to recover the letter, only to discover that it has already been loaded into the Railway Mail Service compartment of the Gandhadagudi Express. The group immediately boards the train in an effort to retrieve it. Meanwhile, Dhanush has reconnected with his childhood friend Priya, who has developed feelings for him. Her proposal rejected, a disheartened Priya now returns to Bangalore by the same train that carries the fake bomb later that the friends have now boarded.

Aboard the train and while attempting to retrieve the letter, Dhanush accidentally overhears conversations suggesting that an actual bomb attack on the train is being planned. The friends continue their attempts to recover the letter after learning that it has been transferred to the postal sorting office in Bangalore and is scheduled to be delivered to the railway authorities. Priya eventually learns the truth and joins them in their efforts.

The situation escalates when Satya is kidnapped by terrorists, who reveal that a real bomb has indeed been planted on the train on the same date mentioned in the prank letter in a coincidence. The kidnappers threaten Satya's life and force Dhanush to retrieve the letter before the authorities are alerted. Dhanush eventually locates and defuses the bomb hidden inside a baby stroller on the train. He and his friends then identify the real terrorists after suspecting several passengers during the journey. An undercover Anti-Terrorism Squad arrives in time and arrests the terrorists. Following the ordeal, Dhanush finally confesses his love for Priya.

== Cast ==
- Ganesh as Dhanush
- Archana Gupta as Priya
- Avinash Bharadwaj as Sathyaprakash
- Mithra as Karisubbu
- Pawan Kumar as Krishnamurthy "Kitty"
- Murali as Michael Fernandes
- Avinash as Krishnamurthy, Dhanush's father
- Padmaja Rao as Dhanush's mother
- Achyuth Kumar as Priya's father
- Aruna Balraj as Priya's mother
- K. V. Manjayya as Priya's uncle
- Suma Rao as Kala, Priya's aunt
- Sadhu Kokila as Gangadhar, loco pilot of the Gandhadagudi Express
- Chi. Guru Dutt as passenger on the Gandhadagudi Express
- Dharma as passenger on the Gandhadagudi Express
- Muniraju as passenger on the Gandhadagudi Express
- Arun Sagar as Arunegowda, ATS officer
- Laya Kokila as Krishnappa, employee in Mysore Junction railway station
- Rekha Das as Lakshmi, Krishnappa's wife
- Bindushree as Bindu, Dhanush's sister
- Sree (Crazy Mindz) as terrorist
- Saikrishna
- Kanchana
- Thriveni
- Renu
- Yathiraj
- Vaijanath Biradar as Murthy, employee in Mysore Junction railway station
- Nagashekar as a postman
- Dayal Padmanabhan as beggar on the Gandhadagudi Express (uncredited)
- Mysore Jadhav as ticket collector on the Gandhadagudi Express
- R. G. Vijayasarathy as station master

== Soundtrack ==
Circus

Soundtrack album by Emil
- Released: 15 December 2008
- Genre: Film score
- Length: 30:03
- Label: Rock D Tracks
- Producer: Dayal Padmanabhan

Emil chronology
Nanda Loves Nanditha (2008)	Circus (2008)	Kal Manja (2011)

The official soundtrack contains six songs composed by Emil Mohammed with lyrics penned by Kaviraj, Yogaraj Bhat and Manjunath Rao. The audio of the film released on 15 December 2008. The opening lines of the song Jeeva Hoovagide was used from the popular song of same name (I Love You) from the 1981 movie Nee Nanna Gellalare.

No.	Title	Lyrics	Singer(s)	Length
1.	"Baaro Geleya"	Kaviraj	Karthik, Emil	5:02
2.	"Pisugudale (1)"	Yogaraj Bhat	Sonu Nigam	5:16
3.	"Circus"	Manjunath Rao	Karthik, Hemanth Kumar, Ranjith, Emil	4:38
4.	"Jeeva Hoovaagide"	Manjunath Rao	Aryan, Archana Udupa, Shehanaz, Gangothri Rangaswamy	4:52
5.	"Sajnaare"	Yogaraj Bhat	Harish Raghavendra, Aarathi	5:02
6.	"Pisugudale (2)"	Yogaraj Bhat	Naresh Iyer	5:13
Total length:				30:03

== Reception ==
=== Critical response ===
Circus received mixed to positive reviews from critics.

R G Vijayasarathy of Rediff.com gave 3/5 stars and wrote "Circus may not be a top class thriller but still has enough entertaining arsenal to please film fans. Watch it if you love thrillers." The Times of India gave 3/5 stars and wrote "There is freshness in the script and narration. Though slow in the first half, it gets lively in the second half." Bangalore Mirror wrote "Despite the drawbacks, Circus is worth a watch".

=== Box office ===
The film was declared as a good grosser by completing 50 days at the box office.

== Home media ==
The satellite rights of the film were sold to Star Suvarna and was released on DVD with 5.1 channel surround sound with English subtitles and VCD.
