= Aushim Khetarpal =

Aushim Khetarpal is an actor and producer from India.

== Biography ==
He started his career as an Indian sports promoter; his name got involved in match fixing. He then made a feature film, Shirdi Saibaba as a producer and actor. The historical movie gained acknowledgements worldwide.

He then produced a film with Faisal Saif titled Come December, which was International Award Winner. The film is yet to be released worldwide. He is also seen in a TV serial Shirdi Saibaba, which airs on Sony TV India and on Zee TV.

== Filmography ==
=== Actor ===
- Shirdi Saibaba (2001) ... Arjun
- Come December (2006) ... Om
- Om Allah (2011) ... Aushim
- Children of God (2026 film) Teacher

=== Producer ===
- Shirdi Saibaba (2001)
- Come December (2006)
- Om Allah (2011)

== Awards ==
Won Best Spiritual Film of the Century 1st Diorama International Film Festival & Market (2019) for Shirdi Saibaba
