= Kavita Radheshyam =

Indian Bollywood actress

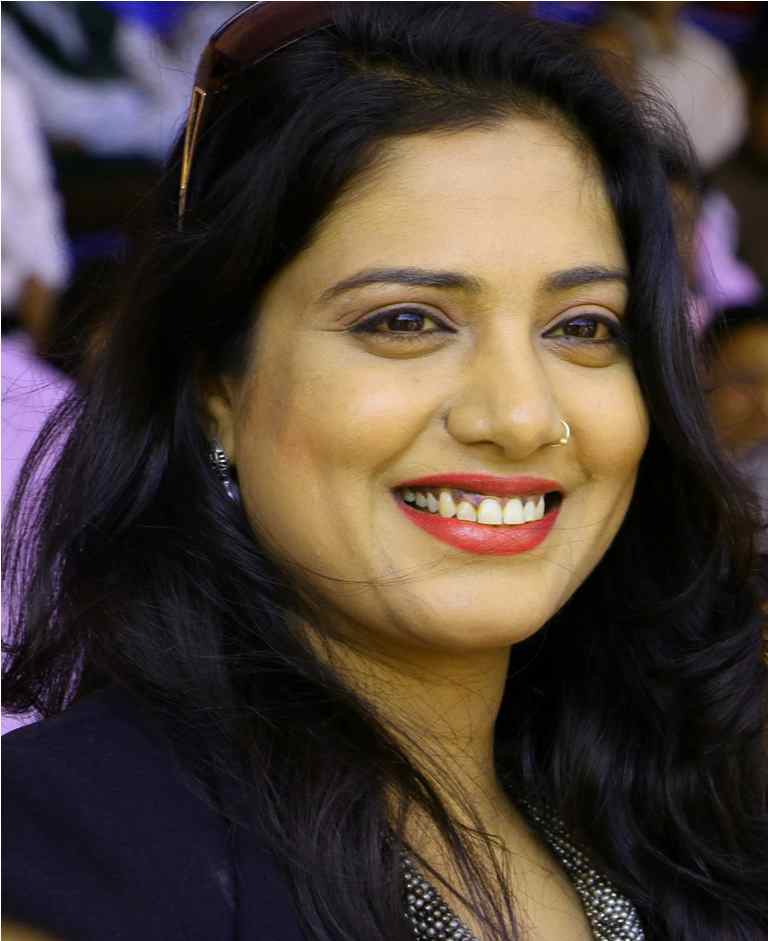
- Occupation: Actress
- Years active: 2012–present

Kavita Radheshyam is an Indian actress who debuted in director Vikram Bhatt's thriller TV series Who Done It Uljhan. She appears in few Kannada, Tamil films as a supporting role and Hindi films.

== Career ==
=== Debut and breakthrough ===
Radheshyam received a degree in an acting institute in 2009. She continued to act in short films made under Subhash Ghai's Whistling Woods International. Kavita debuted with noted director Faisal Saif's Hindi feature film Paanch Ghantey Mien Paanch Crore that got listed under the Top 10 Bold Film category of 2012 by The Times of India. Filmmaker Rupesh Paul approached her for his film Kamasutra 3D, but she refused to star in it. She also appeared in Marathi remake of 1988's classic Khoon Bhari Maang, which is titled Bharla Malwat Rakhtaana.

Radheshyam has frequently collaborated in films directed by Faisal Saif, which includes Paanch Ghantey Mien Paanch Crore, Main Hoon Rajinikanth, Amma and the under-production Shraap 3D.

Radheshyam starred in 2014's Faisal Saif's controversial film Main Hoon Rajinikanth, where Tamil actor Rajinikanth moved the Madras High Court to stop the release and screening of the film However, the film got released with a new changed title Main Hoon (Part-Time) Killer.

== Anti-LGBT remarks after Orlando shooting ==
In the wake of the Orlando nightclub shooting, Radheshyam received criticism after posting on Facebook and Twitter: "Felt Very Sad About #OrlandoShooting.. Aren't #LGBT Against Nature? Whatever Is Against Nature, Shouldn't Live.." India Today headlined an article about the incident, "Straight and nuts: Actress Kavita Radheshyam says Orlando victims deserved death".

On Facebook, she has maintained her opinion about the LGBT community. She quoted former additional Solicitor General of India P. P. Malhotra, who called gay sex "unnatural", "highly immoral and against social order" in a 2008 address to the Supreme Court.

In response to allegations that her online remarks were a publicity stunt, she noted that she had expressed support for the anti-gay law Section 377 three years earlier. She sparked another controversy by saying "Celebrities who are HIV infected are either Gay or Bisexual, I want my haters to do a small research."

== Filmography ==
Year	Movie	Role	Language
2012	Paanch Ghantey Mien Paanch Crore	Reshma Salahuddin	Hindi
2014	Bharla Malwat Rakhtaana	Mona / Atyaa	Marathi
2014	Ragini IPS	Savithri	Kannada
2015	Main Hoon Rajinikanth	Mallika	Hindi
2016	Jaguar	Chilakka/Chelvi	Telugu, Kannada
2017	Islamic Exorcist		English
2017	Sheitaan	Ayesha Khan	Hindi
2019	Comali	Owner of Bajji (Fried Fritter) Shop	Tamil

== Television ==
Year	Show	Role	Language	Channel
2011	Ghazab Desh Ki Ajab Kahaaniyan	Celebrity Guest	Hindi	NDTV Imagine
2010	Who Dunnit Uljhan	Ganga Bai	Hindi	Star One

== See also ==
- Kavita Radheshyam Animal Movement
