= Ragini IPS =

- Directed by: Anand P. Raju
- Screenplay by: Anand P. Raju
- Story by: Danny Chadaga
- Produced by: K. Manju
- Starring: Ragini Dwivedi; Avinash; Vivek Pandit; Kavita Radheshyam
- Narrated by: Upendra
- Cinematography: M. U. Nandakumar
- Edited by: K. M. Prakash
- Music by: Songs: Emil Mohammed; Score: Rajesh Ramanath
- Production company: K. Manju Cinemaas
- Release date: 28 March 2014
- Running time: 140 minutes
- Country: India
- Language: Kannada

Ragini IPS is a 2014 Indian Kannada-language action film directed by Anand P. Raju and produced by K. Manju. It stars Ragini Dwivedi in the lead role and was the first Kannada film to be named after an actress. Avinash, Kavita Radheshyam and Narayanaswamy appear in supporting roles. It was dubbed in Hindi as Hindustani Jaanbaaz 2. It is loosely based on the 1988 Hindi movie Zakhmi Aurat.

Upon theatrical release on 28 March 2014, the film received positive to mixed reviews from critics, with Dwivedi's performance receiving praise. The film was screened at the International Film and Entertainment Festival in Sydney, Australia, in November 2014.

== Plot ==
The film tells the story about a strict IPS officer, Ragini (Ragini Dwivedi), who aims to rid the society of goons and corrupt politicians, and also ensure that women lead a safe and decent life. In the process, she is tied to bed and gang raped by 8 to 10 goons as revenge against her; they brutally assault her by using their call girl women as bait. The crux of the story is based around how her name is ruined in the police department and how she takes revenge.

== Cast ==
- Ragini Dwivedi as ASP Ragini IPS
- Avinash as Hiremath
- Kavita Radheshyam as Savithri
- Narayanaswamy as Jagadish
- Achyuth Kumar
- Ninasam Ashwath as Maadegowda
- Ramesh Bhat
- Junglee Prasanna
- Veena Sundar
- Jayasimha Musuri
- Jasper
- Sudhakar
- Raam
- Vivek Pandith
- Ravindra
- Girish
- Soujanya as Soujanya
- Chikkanna
- Bhavya bhuvanahalli chandre Gowda
- Petrol Prasanna
- Ram Prasad
- Manjaiah
- Mohan Juneja

== Production ==
The filming of Ragini IPS began on 24 May 2012, on Ragini Dwivedi's 22nd birthday. The stunts for the film were directed by Mass Madha. Director Anand P. Raju approached actress Rishika Singh for an important role in the film but later opted for Bollywood actress Kavita Radheshyam. Having been trained in Taekwondo, all the stunts in the film were performed by Dwivedi herself without using a body double.

== Soundtrack ==
Ragini IPS

Soundtrack album by Emil Mohammed
- Released: 8 March 2014
- Recorded: 2012
- Genre: Feature film soundtrack
- Language: Kannada
- Label: Anand Audio

Emil Mohammed chronology
Namo Bhootatma (2014)	Ragini IPS (2014)	Mahakali (2015)

The music of the film was composed by Emil Mohammed. The soundtrack album of the film was released on 8 March 2014. The raunchy song "Menasina Kaaee" went viral on social media and Bollywood actress Kavita Radheshyam who debuts with this film in Kannada was compared with late south Indian actress and sex symbol Silk Smitha by press and media.

No.	Title	Lyrics	Artist(s)	Length
1.	"Sakhathu Sakhathu"	V. Nagendra Prasad	Sowmya Raoh
2.	"Menasina Kaaee"	V. Nagendra Prasad	Ramya
3.	"Hennondu Devarendu"	Anand	Hemanth Kumar

=== Reception ===
Kavya Christopher of The Times of India gave the album a rating of one out of five and said, "The number of songs for Ragini IPS has been restricted to two, and it is undoubtedly one of the wisest decisions taken by whosoever has done that." and concluded writing, "Musically, this film assures just mediocrity."

== Release and reception ==
The film was set for release on Ragini Dwivedi's 23rd birthday on 24 May 2013 but was postponed to August due to various reasons. It was then postponed for a 27 December release. The release again got delayed after sources said the producer of the film was requested by the producer and director of Chatrapathi to postpone its theatrical release due to both films slated to release on 27 December. After delaying the release for almost a year, the film was finally released on 28 March 2014.

=== Critical reception ===
Ragini IPS received positive to mixed reviews from critics upon its theatrical release. G. S. Kumar of The Times of India gave the film a rating of three out of five and wrote, "...Ragini IPS is purely a commercial flick. The formula is not novel, with action queen Malashri having portrayed similar roles earlier. Ragini's high-octane stunts may be a draw, but the cop thriller scores low on dialogues." Indiaglitz gave the film a 7.5/10 rating and wrote, "...'Ragini IPS' a solid action film from one of the ravishing beauty on Kannada screen Ragini." and concluded writing that the commercial entertainer was worth watching. Sify.com gave the film a rating of 3/5 and wrote, "Ragini IPS finally sees a theatrical release and when watched for something out of the box, the audience find nothing but another usual woman oriented action movie. Though the script does not appeal as expected, it is quite successful in entertaining the mass audience and also tells people what is right and wrong in a realistic manner."
