= Children of God (2026 film) =

Upcoming Indian social drama film

- Directed by: Ashish Saxena
- Starring: Aushim Khetarpal; Akash Verma; Raadhika Khetarpal
- Production company: Aum Sportainment Pvt Ltd
- Release date: 24 July 2026
- Running time: 90 minutes
- Country: India
- Language: Hindi

Children of God is an upcoming Indian Hindi-language social drama film directed by Ashish Saxena and produced by Aum Sportainment Pvt Ltd. Based on a true story, the film follows a young individual navigating issues of gender identity, social exclusion, and self-acceptance. The film is scheduled for a theatrical release on 24 July 2026.

== Plot ==
The film centers on Amit, a young person who faces discrimination and rejection because of his gender expression. After experiencing difficulties within his family and social environment, he leaves home and relocates to Bhopal in search of a new beginning. In Bhopal, Amit encounters members of the transgender community and gradually finds a sense of belonging. Adopting the name Amita, he begins to rebuild his life while confronting personal and social challenges. Along the way, a mentor named Aushim encourages him to understand and accept his identity. The story follows Amit's journey through exclusion, self-discovery, and personal transformation.

== Cast ==
- Aushim Khetarpal as Aushim
- Akash Verma as Amit
- Raadhika Khetarpal as an Odyssey Dancer

== Production ==
The film is directed by Ashish Saxena and produced under the banner of Aum Sportainment Pvt Ltd. It is based on a true story and is presented as a social drama.

== Release ==
Children of God is scheduled for theatrical release in India on 24 July 2026.
