= Sultan Khan (musician) =

Indian sarangi player and vocalist (1940–2011)

Ustad Sultan Khan Padma Bhushan
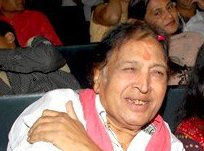
- Sultan Khan in 2009

Background information
- Born: 15 April 1940; Jodhpur, Jodhpur State, British India
- Origin: Rajasthan, India
- Died: 27 November 2011 (aged 71) Mumbai, Maharashtra, India
- Genre: Hindustani classical music
- Occupation: Sarangi player
- Instrument: Sarangi
- Years active: 1960 – 2009
- Formerly of: Tabla Beat Science, Zakir Hussain

Ustad Sultan Khan (15 April 1940 – 27 November 2011) was an Indian sarangi player and classical vocalist belonging to Sikar Gharana. He was one of the founding members of the Indian fusion group Tabla Beat Science, with Zakir Hussain and Bill Laswell. He was awarded the Padma Bhushan, India's 3rd highest civilian honour, in 2010.

== Early life ==
Sultan Khan was born on 15 April 1940, in Sikar District, Rajasthan, a princely state in the Indian Empire. He learned sarangi from his father Ustad Gulab Khan.

== Career ==
At the age of 20, Sultan Khan started his career at the All India Radio station, Rajkot in Gujarat in 1960. After spending eight years in Rajkot, he played with Lata Mangeshkar during her visit to Rajkot. She asked him to play the sarangi while she sang. Thereafter, he was transferred to the Mumbai radio station. Having joined the Mumbai radio, he became deeply involved with the Mumbai classical music circuit and film industry music.

He gave his first performance at the All-India Music Conference at the age of 11, and performed on an international scale with Ravi Shankar on George Harrison's Dark Horse World Tour in 1974.

Sultan Khan accompanied musicians including Ustad Amir Khan, Ustad Bade Ghulam Ali Khan, Pt.Omkarnath Thakur, Ustad Nazakat Ali Khan-Salamat Ali Khan of Pakistan, Kishori Amonkar, Zakir Hussain and many others. He also performed on-stage with sitar player Ravi Shankar and tabla player Alla Rakha at the classical music concerts. He is acknowledged both as a sarangi player and a vocalist, and has multiple albums to his credit.

He has taught music producers such as Sukshinder Shinda and Ram Gopal Varma (who provided the music for his film, Deyyam) to play the sarangi. He had many students, but few gandhabandh disciples are Bollywood music composer and director Vishal Bhardwaj, Sandesh Shandaliya, composer Ilaiyaraaja, Gurdas Maan, Falu, Anand Vyas, Ikram Khan, Vinod Pawar, Sabir khan, Dilshad Khan, and Deeyah, a Norwegian-born singer, and he performed on her debut album I Alt Slags Lys in 1992.

He played sarangi for R. D. Burman.

He contributed vocals and sarangi to Dizrhythmia's first LP and Gavin Harrison's 1998 solo album Sanity & Gravity. He sang "Albela Sajan Aayo Re..."along with Kavita Krishnamurthy and Shankar Mahadevan in the Hindi film Hum Dil De Chuke Sanam in 1999. He has also given his voice in films like Maqbool, Kachche Dhaage, Mr. and Mrs. Iyer, Parzania, Jab We Met, Agni Varsha, Superstar, Rahul and Paanch. He also performed or recorded with Pakistani qawwali singer Nusrat Fateh Ali Khan.

In 1982, the Oscar-winning film Gandhi also featured his music and thereafter he recorded for other Hollywood films such as Heat and Dust in 1983 (Merchant Ivory productions). Sultan Khan played the sad sarangi music during the sorrowful scenes of Mahatma Gandhi's assassination and funeral. In 1993, he performed along with Ustad Alla Rakha and Ustad Zakir Hussain in one of the rooms at the House of Commons of the United Kingdom where eminent persons were in attendance to witness a rare musical performance. After that, he became a regular artist for BBC Radio London. He was also interviewed for the BBC world service and also composed the musical track for the BBC 2 documentary "London Calling"(1997).

The association with film maker Ismail Merchant further when Ustad Sultan Khan together with Ustad Zakir Hussain composed the soundtrack for the film In Custody (1993) and where the musical score adapted to suite a particular genre of the Urdu language. Thereafter, Ustad Sultan Khan also composed musical score for another Merchant Ivory production, this time for Channel 4 in Britain, called "The Street Musician of Bombay".

He has several albums to his credit and was praised for his performances by Madonna in 1997. He also performed in a Sufi Music Festival at the White House in Washington, D. C. in 1998. He played at a select party in honour of the Prince of Wales's birthday at Buckingham Palace in 1997.

Sultan Khan appeared on Good People in Times of Evil in 2000, with Jonas Hellborg and guitar virtuoso Shawn Lane. Sultan Khan once told an interviewer, "Western influences have given a different dimension to my music."

Ustad Sultan Khan's album Piya Basanti together with indian playback singer K. S. Chitra was released in 2000 and it was the number one album of the year. The title song won an international viewers' choice award at the 2001 MTV Video Music Awards. Some of his other famous albums are Ustad & the Divas (T-Series), Ustad Sultan Khan & his friends (Times Music), Shoonya (BMG), Bhoomi (Virgin), and Pukaar (Sony Music) with Ustad Nusrat Fateh Ali Khan.

Sultan Khan performed for the Tamil film Yogi. He played a solo sarangi for Yogi's theme and also for the song "Yaarodu Yaaro" from the same album.

British writer Geoff Dyer has said that he is an admirer of Sultan Khan's work, especially his rendition of a Rajastani folk song at the end of a 1991 recording of Rag Bhupali with Zakir Hussain on tabla. He has written of Khan's performance, "It is one of the most beautiful pieces of music I know - an audible vision of how the world might appear if you were able to purge yourself of all baseness and ugliness."

His last work, composed alongside his son Sabir Khan, was used in the multilingual film Amma.

== Awards and recognition ==
- Padma Bhushan Award in 2010
- Sultan Khan won numerous musical awards including the Sangeet Natak Akademi Award in 1992, also known as the President's Award, as well as the Gold Medalist Award of Maharashtra and the American Academy of Artists Award in 1998. In 1997, he was requested to perform at Prince Charles's 49th birthday celebrations.

== Family ==
He is survived by his wife Bano, son Sabir Khan who is his disciple and a sarangi player, as well as two daughters Reshma and Shera. His brother Late Nasir Khan was a sitar player, as is his younger brother Niyaz Ahmed Khan. His nephews include Salamat Ali Khan (sitar player), Imran Khan (sitar player and music composer), Dilshad Khan (sarangi player) and Irfan Khan (sitar player).

== Death and legacy ==
Sultan Khan died on 27 November 2011 in Mumbai, Maharashtra, India after a prolonged illness. His death occurred on the eve of the 11th anniversary of the release of his album, Piya Basanti Re.

He was undergoing kidney dialysis for the last four years and lost his speech in the last few days of his life. He died on his way to the hospital. The funeral was held in his hometown of Jodhpur, Rajasthan on 28 November 2011.

The New York Times newspaper carried his obituary and quoted the tabla player Zakir Hussain as saying, "It is thought among musicians in India that his sarangi literally sang. He was able to coax out of the instrument all the nuances of the vocal style of Indian music."

== Sources ==
- India TV News
