= Kavita Radheshyam Animal Movement =

Internet-based animal rights movement

- Founded: August 2011
- Founder: Kavita Radheshyam
- Purpose: Animal rights
- Location: India, Internet
- Website: http://www.kavitaradheshyam.in

The Kavita Radheshyam Animal Movement (KRAM) is an internet-based animal rights movement started by Bollywood actress and animal activist Kavita Radheshyam. Radheshyam held a naked photo shoot to spotlight cruelty against animals in India, and became the brand ambassador for the International Organization for the Protection of Animals (OIPA), an Italian-based animal rights group. Unsatisfied with the way the organization worked, Kavita left and started KRAM.

== See also ==
- Animal welfare and rights in India
