= Jigyaasa =

- Directed by: Faisal Saif
- Written by: Faisal Saif; Mehmood Ali
- Produced by: Raju Chand
- Music by: Ram Shankar
- Release date: 10 March 2006
- Running time: 140 minutes
- Country: India
- Language: Hindi

Jigyaasa, released on 10 March 2006, is an Indian Hindi-language movie starring Hrishitaa Bhatt. The movie is directed by Faisal Saif. It was called the year's most controversial feature film, and was rumored to be based on the life of Indian actress, item girl and sex symbol Mallika Sherawat. Bhatt's performance in the film was praised by critics.

Small time Marathi actress Teja Deokar played Hrishitaa Bhatt's part in the recent unofficial remake in Marathi titled Nati, which means 'Actress'.

== Plot ==
Based on actual events, the film tells the story of an innocent girl named Jigyaasa Mathur (Hrishitaa Bhatt) who comes from a middle-class family, the daughter of a school teacher named Malini Mathur (Varsha Usgaonkar). Malini is a woman with principles and emotions. Jigyaasa wants to become a film actress and her mother has no objections about it. But Jigyaasa has some other plans. Jigyaasa will go to any limits to reach her goal. Within a timespan of five years, Jigyaasa reaches the top and becomes India's highest paid superstar.

== Cast ==
- Hrishitaa Bhatt as Jigyaasa Mathur
- Varsha Usgaonkar as Malini Mathur
- Kader Khan as Nand Kishore
- Milind Gunaji as Subhash Desai
- Vikas Kalantri as Avinash Chopra
- Jaya Bhattacharya as Neha Sharma
- Mukesh Tiwari a Ksamaal Hussain
- Rakesh Bedi as Ashok Kumar Shaayar (the gay activist)
- Anupam Shyam as Haider Bhai
- Divya Dwivedi as Monisha Singh
- Naseer Abdullah as Ramesh Shah Tak

== Music ==
1. Baaton Hi Baaton Mein - Udit Narayan, Sadhana Sargam
2. Jigyaasa - Ram Shankar
3. Jigyaasa (Remix) - Ram Shankar
4. Khatiya Toot Gayee Sonu Kakkar
5. Meethe Meethe Sapnon Mein - Sadhana Sargam
6. Saansein Meri Saansein - Rahul Vaidya
7. Saansein Meri Sansein (Breathless Mix) - Rahul Vaidya

== Remake ==
The film was unofficially remade in 2014 in Marathi titled Nati which means Actress. However some scenes and dramatization were changed to avoid any legal hassles.

== Criticism and legacy ==
The Lesbian interaction and kiss between Hrishitaa Bhatt and her co-actor in the film's scene was mentioned in an article from Spotboye.com by writer Chetna Kapoor as The Hottest Lesbian And Gay Kisses in Bollywood. Box Office Collection marked Jigyaasa and Madhur Bhandarkar's Heroine as better made films until date with Bollywood used as a backdrop.
