= Bharla Malwat Rakhtaana =

- Directed by: Anup Jagdale
- Produced by: Vignaharta Productions
- Starring: Teja Devkar; Sanjay Khapre; Kavita Radheshyam
- Cinematography: Ameya randive
- Edited by: Anant Kamath
- Music by: Pankaj Padghan
- Production company: Rush Media
- Release date: 14 January 2014
- Country: India
- Language: Marathi

Bharla Malwat Rakhtaana (Marathi: भरला मळवट रक़तान), (meaning: Blood Filled Forehead) is a 2014 Marathi film directed by Anup Jagdale. Vignaharta Productions has produced the film and is said to be a remake of 1988 Hindi film Khoon Bhari Maang.

== Cast ==
- Teja Devkar as Lakshmi
- Sanjay Khapre as Na.Da.Patil
- Kavita Radheshyam as Mona / Atyaa
- Milind Shinde as Subhan Rao

== Production ==
Anup Jagdale reportedly signed actress Kavita Radheshyam to play the role which was originally played by Rekha. An online vote was held on rediff.com to test if users believed Kavita Radheshyam could match actress Rekha in this latest remake. Filmmaker Rakesh Roshan got upset with the Marathi remake of his 1988 classic and sent a legal notice to director Anup Jagdale. Jagdale's response indicated that the film was not a remake of Khoon Bhari Maang.
