= Global Movie =

Indian entertainment periodical

- Editor: Seema Pimpley (Owner, editor); Faisal Saif (Co-editor)
- Frequency: Monthly
- Circulation: 80,000
- Publisher: Seema Pimpley
- Company: Global Movie media Pvt. Ltd.
- Country: India
- Language: English
- Website: globalmovie.in

Global Movie is a magazine, published monthly in India. It is owned by Seema Pimpley. It is primarily a Bollywood magazine and features articles on Bollywood films, actors, stars and reviews. It also features articles on celebrities, tourism and fashion. The magazine was earlier known as Movie.

In 2009, Aishwarya Rai Bachchan did the cover shoot and the magazine was re-christened as Global Movie. In June 2010, Priyanka Chopra did the cover shoot. Deepika Padukone also shot for the magazine cover.
