= P. P. Malhotra =

P. P. Malhotra is a Senior Advocate at the Supreme Court of India. In 2004, he was appointed as an Additional Solicitor General of India and continued in this post until May 2014.

Malhotra has practised law in trial courts of Delhi, Delhi High Court and the Supreme Court of India and remained counsel of Government of India for 12 years after being assigned the job in 1988.
