= Mr. Celebrity (2024 film) =

2024 Indian Telugu-language film by Chandina Ravi Kishore

- Theatrical release poster
- Directed by: Chandina Ravi Kishore
- Written by: Chandina Ravi Kishore
- Produced by: N. Pandurangarao; Chinna Reddaiah
- Starring: Varalaxmi Sarathkumar; Paruchuri Sudarshan; Sri Deeksha
- Cinematography: Shiva Kumar Dewarakonda
- Edited by: Shiva Sharvani
- Music by: Vinod Yajamanya
- Production company: RP Cinemas
- Release date: 4 October 2024
- Country: India
- Language: Telugu

Mr. Celebrity is a 2024 Indian Telugu-language action thriller film written and directed by Chandina Ravi Kishore. The film features Varalaxmi Sarathkumar, Paruchuri Sudarshan and Sri Deeksha in lead roles.

The film was released on 4 October 2024.

== Plot ==
Lalita, a fearless activist who claims she was raped in her dreams, with physical marks as proof. As the investigation unfolds, a mysterious masked figure traps Lalita, a YouTuber, and a cop in a suspenseful game that tests their wits, emotions, and family ties, blending elements of thriller and comedy.

== Cast ==
- Varalaxmi Sarathkumar
- Paruchuri Sudarshan as Lucky
- Sri Deeksha as Lalitha
- Nassar as Ramachandrayya
- Raghu Babu as SI Narahari
- Saptagiri
- Aamani as Janaki

== Music ==
The background score and soundtrack is composed by Vinod Yajamanya.

All music is composed by Vinod Yajamanya.

Track list
No.	Title	Lyrics	Singer(s)	Length
1.	"Nee Jathaga"	Ganesh	Javed Ali	3:35
2.	"Nee Valle Nee Valle"	Rambabu Gosala	Bhavana	2:48
3.	"Do Lucky"	Ganesh	Nakash Aziz	3:14
4.	"Gajanana"	Ganesh	Mangli	3:10

== Release ==
Mr. Celebrity was released on 4 October 2024.

== Reception ==
Suhas Sistu of The Hans India gave a rating of 2.75 out of 5 and stated that, "Mr. Celebrity tackles the theme of "Freedom of Speech" and the impact of media attention", while appreciating the performance of Paruchuri Sudarshan. Avad Mohammad of OTTPlay gave a rating of 2.5 out of 5 and wrote "Mr. Celebrity is a message oriented social drama that addresses various corrupt issues in the society". News18 Telugu also gave the same rating.
