= Paanch Ghantey Mien Paanch Crore =

Paanch Ghantey Mein Paanch Crore
- Directed by: Faisal Saif
- Written by: Faisal Saif
- Produced by: Dr.Joginder Singh Padam
- Starring: Meera; Abhishek Kumar; Kavita Radheshyam; Shawar Ali
- Cinematography: Sumesh K. Chandran
- Edited by: Ashutosh
- Music by: Leonard Victor
- Release date: 10 August 2012
- Running time: 110 minutes (uncut version)
- Country: India
- Language: Hindi

Paanch Ghantey Mein Paanch Crore (also known as 5 Ghantey Mein 5 Crore; transl. five crore in five hours) is a Psycho Thriller film written and directed by Faisal Saif. This film is Pakistani film actor Meera's third Bollywood film in five years. The Times of India listed the film in Bollywood's Top 10 Bold Film category of 2012 along with films such as Ishaqzaade, Raaz 3 and Hate Story.

== Plot ==
Chartered accountant Vikram and his wife Soniya are waiting for another accountant, Muqaadam to deliver R50 million in hard cash to their farmhouse. Vikram works for Sultan Corporation, which is owned by Sultan. As soon as Muqaadam delivers the money, Vikram and Sonia plan to kill Muqaadam and escape to Singapore the next day to start a new life. Vikram and Soniya go exactly by their plan. Enter Karan Oberoi, whose car breaks down in front of Vikram's farmhouse. Karan also happens to be Soniya's ex-classmate in junior college. Reshma Salahuddin, an exotic bar dancer is 3 months pregnant and is waiting for her boyfriend Muqaadam to return. Until she finds out Muqaadam is killed, she starts a dirty game of love, betrayal, murder, and deceit. Three people with 5 hours to go and with 50 million hard cash.

== Cast ==
- Meera as Sonia
- Abhishek Kumar as Karan Oberoi
- Kavita Radheshyam as Reshma Salahuddin
- Shawar Ali as Vikram
- Ranjeet as Sultaan Khan
- Naseer Abdullah as Inspector Raam Singh
- Rashid Khan as Accountant Muqaadam
- Sameer Bashir Khan as Rashid The Henchman

== Production ==
=== Casting ===
Faisal Saif first approached critically acclaimed actress Tabu for the part of Sonia, but later opted for Pakistani actress Meera who was not only impressed with the script, but also did the film for free.

=== First look ===
Galaxy Lollywood covered the film's music and trailer launch by praising the trailer and music of the film. Independent Bollywood revealed the film's first look.

=== Release ===
The film was slated to release on 8 June 2012 along with Dibakar Banerjee's Shanghai, but it was postponed to 10 August 2012 Eid release along with Salman Khan's Ek Tha Tiger.

== Reception ==
Professional ratings
Review scores
Source	Rating
Independent Bollywood	3/5 stars
Filmy Town	2/5 stars
Live India News	2.5/5 stars
Bollywood Hungama (Music Review)	2.5/5 stars

The film was not screened for press and critics as the director Faisal Saif wanted to show the film directly to the audience, The film managed a decent opening of 50% with its limited cinema release. Independent Bollywood gave the film 3 out of 5 Stars and called it 'A Tight Thriller'. Filmy Town gave the movie 2 out of 5 Stars and wrote 'A crisp screenplay that keeps the viewer hooked on to till the climax'.

== Soundtrack ==
The soundtrack of the film was released by Worldwide Records (India). Joginder Tuteja of Bollywood Hungama gave the soundtrack 2.5 out of 5 Stars and wrote "Well, brace yourselves, as this one turns out to be one of the bigger surprises of the year. Give it a chance; it actually has quite a few good songs that manage to hold on to their own!". Music reviewer Amanda Sodhi wrote "It's totally worth it for O Sone Ke Kangna and Kya Wajah Thi Tere Jaane Ki".

Paanch Ghantey Mein Paanch Crore

Studio album by Bandana Sharma, Shibani Kashyap, Rustam Fateh Ali Khan, Javed Ali, Sourish, Leonard Victor, Hasan Amin
- Genre: Feature film soundtrack
- Label: Worldwide Records

=== Track listing ===
No.	Title	Music	Singer(s)	Length
1.	"Kya Wajah Thi Tere Jaaney Ki"	Tony Kakkar	Bandana Sharma, Javed Ali	4:51
2.	"Aaye Nahin Chain"	Rustam Fateh Ali Khan	Rustam Fateh Ali Khan	4:27
3.	"O Sone Ke Kangna (Female)"	Leonard Victor	Shibani Kashyap	3:05
4.	"Kamsin"	Leonard Victor	Manjira, Swastee Shree Sharma	3:29
5.	"Mashah Allah Kya Kehna"	Sourish	Sourish	3:25
6.	"Yaadien, Yaadien"	Rustam Fateh Ali Khan	Rustam Fateh Ali Khan	5:02
7.	"O Sone Ke Kangna (Male)"	Leonard Victor	Leonard Victor	3:03
8.	"Kya Jadu Hai Yeh"	Leonard Victor	Leonard Victor, Suzanne	4:34
9.	"Zindagi Kahun"	Ali Mustafa	Hasan Amin	4:23
