= Adhey Neevu Adhey Nenu =

- Directed by: Kondal
- Written by: Kondal
- Produced by: Govindu Kandregula
- Starring: Trinadh Varma; Thanvi Negi; Yashwanth Pendyala; Sahar Krishnan
- Cinematography: Nimmala Jaipal Reddy
- Edited by: Chota K. Prasad
- Music by: Kanishka
- Production company: Sri Lakshmi Veerabhadra Creations
- Release date: 31 July 2026
- Running time: 124 minutes
- Country: India
- Language: Telugu

Adhey Neevu Adhey Nenu is an Indian Telugu-language romantic crime thriller film directed by Kondal, and produced by Kandregula Govindu under Sri Lakshmi Veerabhadra Creations banner. The film stars Trinadh Varma, Yashwanth Pendyala, Tanvi Negi, and Sahar Krishnan.

Nimmala Jaipal Reddy handled the cinematography for the film. Kanishka scored the music for the film. Chota K. Prasad edited the film.

== Plot ==
Sri Valli brings two cadavers to a farm house in her car, and then there is a flashback. Sagar, a software employee, and his wife, Sri Valli, live in a gated community in Hyderabad. Sagar is busy with his job, and Sri Valli handles the housework. Sagar's mother, Kalpalatha, cares for her daughter-in-law as if she were her own daughter. While their life proceeds well, Sagar becomes engrossed in his software job and does not maintain a proper physical relationship with his wife. Meanwhile handsome, sociable, and likeable Karthik moves into the house opposite Sri Valli's. He has a software job in Canada and has come to Hyderabad for one project. Sri Valli becomes attracted to him. Despite her conscience, Sri Valli desires Karthik. Later, Karthik proposes to Sri Valli to marry her. And Sri Valli discovers shocking facts about her husband. The truth about Sagar is revealed, as is Sri Valli's decision and how it affected Sagar, Sri Valli and Karthik's lives.

== Cast ==
- Trinadh Varma as Karthik
- Thanvi Negi as Sri Valli
- Yashwanth Pendyala as Sagar
- Sahar Krishnan as Ruby
- Kalpalatha as Savithri
- Bithiri Sathi as Ravi
- Surya Teja
- Sunayana as Sneha

== Production ==
On 9 July 2026 Dil Raju has launched the movie teaser. On 13 July 2026 V. V. Vinayak released a song of the film.

On 23 July 2026 the movie team announced that the film release date is fixed.

The film released in theaters on 31 July 2026.

== Music ==
Kanishka scored the music for the film.

All tracks are written by Purnachary.

Track Listing
No.	Title	Lyrics	Singer(s)	Length
1.	"Manasa Manasa"	Purnachary	Javed Ali	3:55
2.	"Madhurama"	Purnachary	Sai Charan, Jayasri Pallem	3:22
3.	"Seethakoka Chiluka"	Purnachary	Ahmed Khan Durani	2:22
4.	"Adhey Neevu Adhey Nenu"	Purnachary	Kanishka, Aparna	1:21
5.	"Surabhi Surabhi"	Purnachary	Swaraag Keerthan	2:00
6.	"Kanneella Varsham"	Purnachary	Jayasri Pallem	3:22
Total length:				16:22

== Reception ==
Chetupalli Sanjiv Kumar of Hindustantimes gave 2.75/5 rating for the film and stated, "Trinadh Varma and Yashwanth Pendyala, who got fame from Committee Kurraallu movie have acted well in their roles with good involvement. Thavi Negi's acting performance as Sri Valli is a primary strength to the film."

A reviewer of Sakshi has given 2.5/5 rating for the film and stated, "Director Kondal has written the story based on the contemporary real events. Surya Teja and Bithiri Sathi comedy worked well. The first half took much to move the story forward, but the twist before the interval made things more interesting for the second half of the film."

Chinthakindhi Ramu of telugu.timesnow has given the film 2.5/5 rating and stated, "Nimmala Jaipal Reddy's cinematography added beauty to the frames. Chota K. Prasad has edited the movie crisply. And the background score and songs by Kanishka will keep the audience entertained."
