= Mahakali (film) =

- Directed by: S. S. Mahendar
- Written by: Anil Kumar (dialogue)
- Screenplay by: Ajay Kumar
- Story by: Ajay Kumar
- Starring: Malashri
- Cinematography: M Selvam
- Edited by: K M Prakash
- Music by: Emil Mohammed
- Release date: 24 April 2015
- Country: India
- Language: Kannada

Mahakali is a 2015 Indian Kannada-language action drama film directed by S. S. Mahendar and starring Malashri. Dilip Prakash made his debut with this film.

== Cast ==
- Malashri as Devi
- Srinivasa Murthy
- Saurav Lokesh
- Dilip Prakash as Preetham
- Pooja as Asha
- Mico Nagaraj as Nagappa
- Padmini Prakash
- Premalatha

== Soundtrack ==
The music was composed by Emil Mohammed and released under the Anand Audio label.

No.	Title	Singer(s)	Length
1.	"Le Le Navilu Garile"	Ranjith, Emil, Yaasin	4:13
2.	"Kaali Mahakaali"	A. L. Rufiyan	3:41
3.	"Naguva Naguva Mallige"	M. G. Sreekumar, Sangeetha	4:22
4.	"Ontiya Hudignaa"	A. R. Reihana	4:13
Total length:			16:29

== Reception ==
A critic from The Times of India wrote that "A complete Malashree film and that's all there is to it". A critic from Deccan Herald wrote that "Well, if you are fed on the exploits of Malashri, Mahakali is your best bet, with our girl going hammer and tongs at men, trying to right their misdeeds". A critic from Bangalore Mirror wrote that "Despite the presence of a veteran like Mahendar and Malashree, the film looks like an unprofessional product". A critic from The Hindu wrote that "Camera work comprised jarring shots that attempt to highlight the iconic status of Malashree. Comedy scenes reduce women to mere objects of desire, often negating the spirit of women’s empowerment that the rest of the film stands for".
