= Emil Mohammed =

Indian music composer

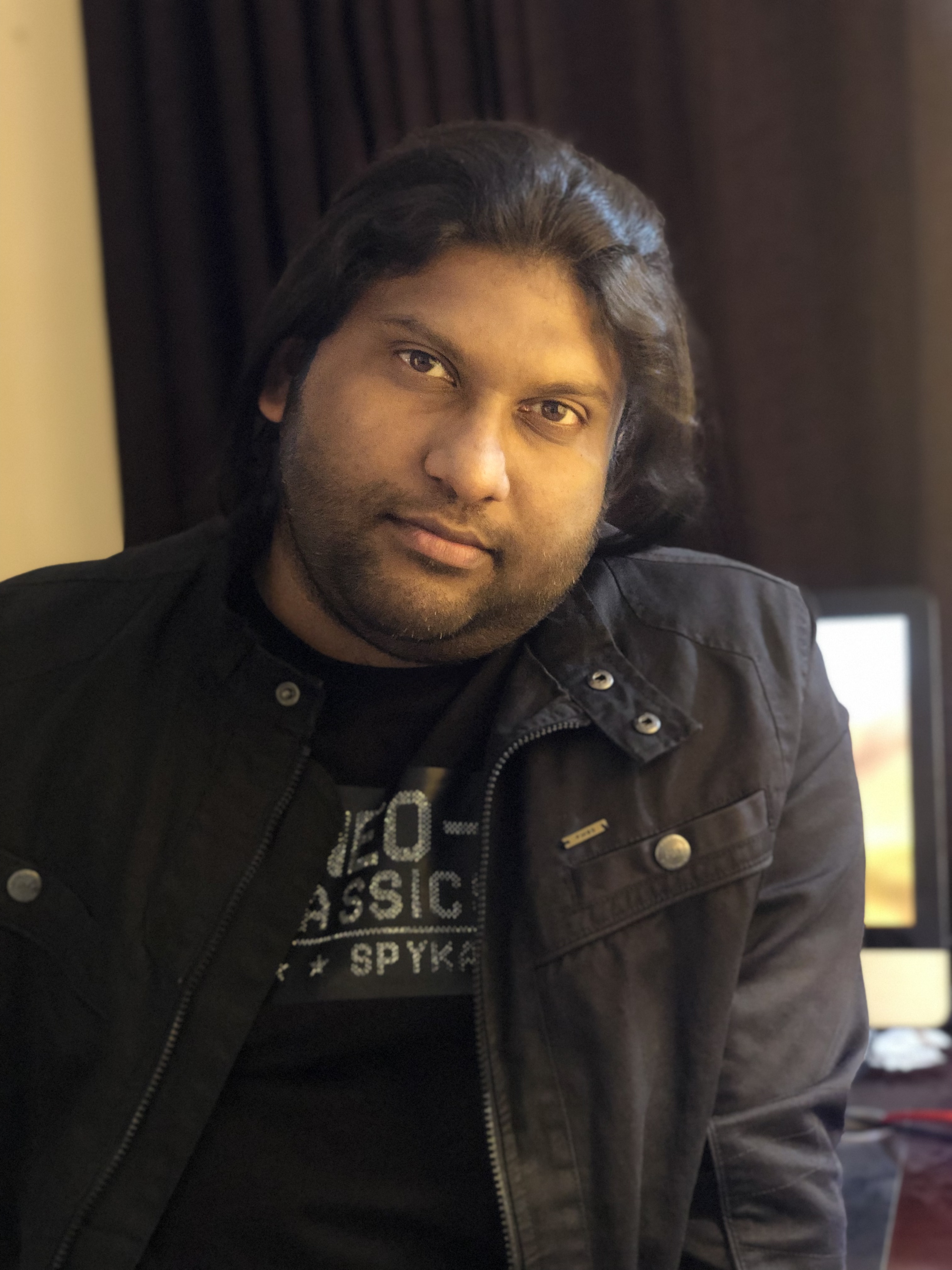
- Emil Mohammed

Background information
- Born: Emil Mohammed; 13 November 1984; Thiruvananthapuram, Kerala
- Genres: Film score, world music, electronic
- Occupations: Music composer, music arranger, mixing engineer, sound designer
- Instruments: Piano, keyboard, synthesizer

Emil Mohammed is an Indian music composer, mixing engineer and sound designer. He is a graduate of SAE School of audio engineering, Chennai. He works predominantly in Malayalam cinema and Kannada cinema. He is known for films such as Mera Naam Shaji directed by Nadirshah Dhairyam, Circus,Nanda Loves Nanditha, Ragini IPS, Kidi and Namo Bhootatma.

== Music career ==
He started as an audio engineer and turned to working for South Indian movies as a keyboard programmer and music producer. He became independent music director in Kannada films like Nanda Loves Nanditha. The song Jinkemarina from Nada loves Nandhitha marked his career as music director and is one of the noted songs in Kannada. Later he composed songs for films as Mera Naam Shaji directed by Nadirshah, Dhairyam Circus, Nanda Loves Nanditha and Ragini IPS.

== Filmography ==
| Year | Title | Language | Credit |
|---|---|---|---|
| 2008 | Nanda Loves Nanditha | Kannada | Credit as Emil |
| 2009 | Yogi | Kannada | Credit as Emil |
| 2009 | Circus | Kannada | Credit as Emil |
| 2010 | Kal Manja | Kannada | |
| 2012 | Nanda Nanditha | Tamil; Telugu | |
| 2014 | Pungi Daasa | Kannada | Credit as Farhan Roshan |
| 2014 | Namo Bhootatma | Kannada | Credit as Farhan Roshan |
| 2014 | Ragini IPS | Kannada | |
| 2015 | Mahakali | Kannada | |
| 2015 | Kadhal Agadhi | Tamil | Credit as Farhan Roshan |
| 2017 | Kidi | Kannada | |
| 2017 | Dhairyam | Kannada | |
| 2019 | Mera Naam Shaji | Malayalam | |
| 2022 | The Morgue | Malayalam | |
