= Mera Naam Shaji =

2019 Malayalam-language film

- Theatrical release poster
- Directed by: Nadirshah
- Screenplay by: Dileep Ponnan
- Story by: Dileep Ponnan; Shaani Khader
- Produced by: B. Rakesh
- Starring: Biju Menon; Asif Ali; Baiju Santhosh; Soubin Shahir
- Cinematography: Vinod Illampally
- Edited by: Johnkutty
- Music by: Songs: Emil Mohammed; Score: Jakes Bejoy
- Production company: Universal Cinemas
- Distributed by: Urvasi Theatres
- Release date: 5 April 2019
- Running time: 134 minutes
- Country: India
- Language: Malayalam

Mera Naam Shaji is a 2019 Indian Malayalam-language comedy film directed by Nadirshah and produced by B. Rakesh under the banner of Universal Cinemas. The film features Biju Menon, Asif Ali and Baiju Santhosh in the lead title roles, with Soubin Shahir as Shaji title role in cameo appearance The film was written by Dileep Ponnan, while music was composed by Emil Mohammed. Nikhila Vimal plays the female lead role as a Tamil girl who is Asif Ali's girlfriend and Sreenivasan and K. B. Ganesh Kumar plays an important role.

== Plot ==
The story revolves around the lives of three persons named from different places in Kerala who are each named Shaji. They are Shaji George from Kochi, Shaji Usman from Kozhikode and Shaji Sukumaran from Thiruvananthapuram. Shaji Usman is a contract killer who accepts risky operations for the sake of supporting his family. His strange modus operandi is to stab people in their buttocks. Once, he gets a quotation through Adv. Lawrence, to attack Dominic, a popular party leader at Kochi.

At the same time, the film shows other two Shaji Sukumaran and Shaji George. Shaji George alias Udaippu Shaji is a conman in Cochin, who is Dominic's brother. Shaji Sukumaran is a cab driver, who on the way to Cochin with four young people. He notices that one of them, Neenu Thomas is seen spending the entire journey alone behind the car, with a doomed face. It doesn't take long for Shaji Sukumaran to understand that she is in trouble. Shaji Usman arrives at Cochin, stabs Dominic and leaves before Shaji Sukumaran passes by and spots the injured Dominic. He immediately takes him to the hospital. Later, Shaji Usman calls his informer and then removes his sim card and throws it off a bridge to destroy any possible evidence. It happens when Shaji George and his friend Kuntheesan are drinking beneath the bridge and the sim card falls right into Kuntheesan's glass. He puts it into his phone before Shaji George gets a call about Dominic's incident. They rush to the hospital but Dominic who hates Shaji due to his lazy attitude, asks him to stay away. Meanwhile, Kuntheesan gets a call from someone through the new sim card. When the caller asks for Shaji (Shaji Usman), the phone is handed over to Shaji George on the account of their same name. The caller says that a reward of 5 lakhs would be given the next day and Shaji George who is drunk, says okay.

The next day, as he is back to his senses, goes in search of the reward before finding out that the person who announced it is the one behind Dominic's attack. As they trace the person, it happens to be Dominic's right-hand man, Sakhavu Gopakumar alias GK. After leaving the reward in a dustbin as per Shaji George's directions, GK drives away while he gets a call from Shaji Usman. Only then does he understand the whole mix up. As the two go to the hospital, Shaji Usman calls in the number and Kuntheesan attends it. As Shaji Usman says he wants to hand over a quotation, Kuntheesan who thinks he too can get money as earlier, decides to repeat the incident. But he gets caught by Shaji Usman. After a big chase, Kuntheesan gets caught and tied up by Shaji Usman who wants his money back.

Meanwhile, Shaji Sukumaran is approached by Neenu who gives him a phone number. This number belongs to Shaji George and it is revealed that both of them were in love with each other. A flashback shows a love blossoms between Neenu and her neighbour Shaji. Neenu's father, who is clearly not interested in this relation, approaches Dominic who assures him to keep Shaji away from her at any cost. Dominic hatches a cruel plan to send him to Nagercoil so that Neenu's father can marry her off to a suitable alliance. Later, he realises Dominic's plan through Kuntheesan and Dominic's wife Jancy. He tries to stop the marriage but fails. This saddens Shaji.

Back to present, Neenu calls Shaji George to tell him how bad her life has been after her marriage. Her husband Jerome is a ruthless brat with friend circles with numerous unhealthy relationships. He tried to rape Neenu multiple times, along with his friend Aby but she escapes. Shaji George is angered at Jerome and his friends and beats them up. But he is also beaten and when Shaji Sukumaran comes to stop them, he also gets hit too. Shaji Sukumaran feels sorry for Shaji George and agrees to help him save Neenu. Meanwhile, Shaji Usman calls Shaji George and the phone is attended by Shaji Sukumaran, leading to hilarious conversations.

Jerome and his team leave for the seaport in a different cab the next day. Shaji George and Shaji Sukumaran leave for the seaport but gets stuck in the traffic jam. Meanwhile, Shaji Usman who is instructed by Lawrence to pack his things for leaving, also enters the same road. Jerome's vehicle also enters, in which Aby's wife Diana starts an argument which disturbs the driver and ultimately causes the vehicle to crash onto a set of shops and create panic. Shaji Usman who sees this, drives his car at full speed towards the crashed vehicle before stopping it, and heroically gets out. It follows with a fight where Shaji Usman beats Jerome and Aby black and blue, while Neenu manages to escape, with Diana's help and she gets into Shaji Usman's car. Shaji George arrives at the seaport and is saddened to see the cruise leaving. Later, all the three Shajis arrive at Lawrence's hotel room. Finally, Neenu and Shaji George reunites and Lawrence ensures to take care of all legal issues. Shaji Usman's money is given to him. Neenu and Shaji George rides away happily and Shaji Sukumaran, after one more hilarious phone conversation with Shaji Usman, happily drives back home.

Before leaving home, Shaji Usman pulls away his sim card and throws it down a bridge yet again. The sim card is found by two men who are drinking beneath the bridge. One of them inserts it in a mobile phone, and gets a call from someone asking for "Shaji". Upon hearing this, the other guy who is also named as Shaji, is astonished and answers the call, while the credits start appearing.

== Cast ==
- Biju Menon as Shaji Usman
- Asif Ali as Shaji George (Udayippu Shaji)
- Baiju Santhosh as Shaji Sukumaran
- Soubin Shahir as Shaji (Cameo Appearance)
- Nikhila Vimal as Neenu Thomas, a Tamil girl who is Shaji George's ex-girlfriend and Jerome's wife after Shaji's wife
- Sreenivasan as Advocate Lawrence
- K. B. Ganesh Kumar as Dominic George, Shaji George's brother
- Tini Tom as SI Ummachan, Sub Inspector of Police
- Dharmajan Bolgatty as Kuntheeshan, Shaji George's friend
- Mythili as Laila, Shaji Usman's wife
- Asha Aravind as Jancy, Dominic's wife
- Surabhi Lakshmi as Sajitha, Shaji Sukumaran's wife
- Jomon K John as Jerome, Neenu's husband
- Shafique Rahman as Aby, Diana's husband and Jerome's friend
- G. Suresh Kumar as Thomas Parangadi Moran, Neenu's father
- Sadiq as Sakhavu Gopakumar
- Nirmal Palazhi as Shaji Usman's Friend
- Kalabhavan Navas as Marunnu Johny
- Savithri Sreedharan as an old lady (Cameo appearance)
- Ranjini Haridas as Diana (Extended Cameo)
- Bheeman Raghu as a Gang leader (Cameo appearance)
- Hareesh Kanaran as Shaji's friend (Cameo appearance)
- Jaffar Idukki as Politician
- Thajudeen Vatakara as The Qawwali Singer (Cameo appearance)
- Remya Thomas as Cameo appearance

== Music ==
Mera Naam Shaji

Soundtrack album by Emil Mohammed
- Released: 2019
- Genre: Film soundtrack
- Language: Malayalam
- Label: Goodwill Entertainments
- Producer: B Rakesh

Emil Mohammed chronology
Dhairyam (2017)	Mera Naam Shaji (2019)

The film score is composed by Jakes Bejoy while the three songs featured in the film are composed by Emil Mohammed with lyrics are written by Santhosh Varma and Munna Shoukath.

Track listing
No.	Title	Singer(s)	Length
1.	"Manasukkulle"	Shreya Ghoshal, Ranjith	04:22
2.	"Mera Naam Shaji"	Jassie Gift, Nadirshah, Suraaj S Vasudev	03:51
3.	"Marhaba"	Javed Ali	04:10

== Release ==
The first look poster of Mera Naam Shaji was released on 13 February 2019. The film was released on 5 April 2019.

== Reception ==
This film received mixed reviews and was an average run at the box office.
