= Sorry Daddy =

- Theatrical release poster
- Directed by: Shakur Sir Vijay PAl
- Produced by: Wasim S. Khan
- Starring: Shameem Khan; Tinu Verma; Mukesh Tiwari; Raghubir Yadav; Razzak Khan; Gayetri Singh
- Cinematography: Hasmukh Rajput
- Edited by: Ashfaque Makrani
- Music by: Original songs: Vishnu Deva; Liyakat Ajmeri; Background Score; Vaishnav Deva
- Production company: S K Films Entertainment
- Release date: 11 December 2015
- Running time: 120 minutes
- Country: India
- Language: Hindi
- Budget: ₹3 crore (US$310,000)

Sorry Daddy is a 2015 Bollywood action drama film directed by Vijay Pal. Starring Shameem Khan and Tinu Verma in the lead roles, it was produced by Wasim Khan under the S K Films banner. Set in early 2014, Sorry Daddy is a children's story centering on the turbulent relationship between Inspector Shameem and his children, a relationship which is affected by children's issues with alcohol abuse and temperament. The film released on 11 September 2015.

== Plot ==
Inspector Ravi Sharma is a very honest and intelligent police officer. He broke the racket of Daddan's illegal wine factory to shows his intention against the enemy of law and society. Meanwhile, his daughter Anishka seeks his help to find out her lost school friend Aditya. Aditya is a very bright student but always looks puzzled because of his drunken father who often fights with his mother. One day, thefather dies accidentally dies in one of these fights. Aditya runs away from the home in fear. Ravi arrests his mother as murderer and she is imprisoned.

Innocent Aditya walks randomly in the city and meets a gang of street beggars who want to help him. But unfortunately he lands in the cage of Sevak Ram. Sevak Ram is a socialist who runs an organization for the betterment of these street children. But the truth is that he make them handicapped and pushes them into begging. Ravi searches for Aditya, but is unable to find him. In this process he learns that there are a lot of people who run the racket of begging and forcing the kidnapped/loss/poorer street children into this business. Now the question appears that, what does Ravi do with these tycoons of the begging mafia and the children who are part of them? What happens with Daddan? And does Ravi succeed in finding Aditya and Sevak Ram? That’s the real story of the film Sorry Daddy.

== Cast and crew ==
- Shameem Khan as Police inspector Ravi
- Tinu Verma as politician
- Kamal Khan as Kamal
- Mukesh Tiwari as Daddan
- Raghuvir Yadav

== Soundtrack ==
Sorry Daddy

Soundtrack album
- Released: 2015
- Recorded: 2015
- Genre: Feature film soundtrack, Soundtrack
- Language: Hindi
- Label: Yellow & Red Music

Track list
No.	Title	Lyrics	Singer(s)	Length
1.	"Tera Pyar Yaar"	Faiz Anwar	Jojo Nathaniel
2.	"Zindagi Ke Dard Se Guzre Huye"	Husna Khan	Javed Ali
3.	"Toot Gaya Ghar Tera" (Female)	Mumtaz Nikhat
4.	"Toot Gaya Ghar Tera" (Male)	Mumtaz Nikhat	Mohammed Salamat
5.	"Teri Muskane"	Sanjit Nirmal	B. Jyoti

== Reception ==
Sorry Daddy opened to negative reviews. The Times of India rated the film 1/5, writing "If you are looking for 2 hours of laugh out loud moments, resort to this unapologetic film." FilmyTown rated the film 1/5, writing "The film is apologetic towards the dad. What about the viewers?" APHerald rated the film 0.5/5, writing "A weird story with weird casting. Some movies are better left unreleased. This is one kind of a movie. Save yourself by not watching this movie." Catch News rated the film 0.5/5, writing "This film is absurd. It looks to have been made by a small-time Jogeshwari gangster looking to teach his community about the importance of children."

== Box office ==
Made on a budget of around Rs. 2 crores, the film grossed only Rs. 70 thousand at the Indian Box Office.
