= Lambasingi (film) =

- Theatrical release poster
- Directed by: Naveen Gandhi
- Written by: Naveen Gandhi
- Produced by: Anand Tanniru
- Starring: Bharat Raj; Divi Vadthya
- Cinematography: K Bujji
- Edited by: Vijay Vardhan Kavuri
- Music by: RR Dhruvan
- Production company: Concept Films
- Distributed by: Disney+ Hotstar
- Release date: 15 March 2024
- Running time: 122 minutes
- Country: India
- Language: Telugu

Lambasingi is an Indian Telugu-language romance drama film written and directed by Naveen Gandhi. Produced by Anand Tanniru under Concept Films, it stars Bharat Raj and Divi Vadthya.

== Cast ==
- Bharat Raj
- Divi Vadthya

== Production ==
The film was announced in April 2022. The principal photography of the film commenced in Lambasingi in February 2022 and wrapped up in March 2022.

== Music ==
Lambasingi

Soundtrack album by RR Dhruvan
- Released: March 13, 2024
- Genre: Feature film soundtrack
- Length: 13:00
- Language: Telugu
- Label: Aditya Music

Official audio
- Lambasingi Full Songs Jukebox on YouTube

Track listing
No.	Title	Singer(s)	Length
1.	"Nachchesinde Nachchesinde"	Sid Sriram	3:58
2.	"Dola Re"	Mangli	3:20
3.	"Vayyari Godari"	Javed Ali	3:53
4.	"Rama Silaka"	RR Dhruvan	2:38
Total length:			13:00

== Release ==
The film was theatrically released on 15 March 2024. The digital streaming rights were acquired by Disney+ Hotstar and it premiered on the streaming service from 2 April 2024.

== Reception ==
Nelki Naresh Kumar of Hindustan Times and Avad Mohammad of OTTPlay gave it 2 1/2 out of 5 stars.
