= Bagpat Ka Dulha =

- Directed by: Karan Kashyap
- Written by: Karan Kashyap; Suhas Singh
- Produced by: Krishan Kumar Bhoot; Raksha Bariya
- Starring: Raza Murad; Ravi Jhankal; Jae Sing; Shubham Teotia
- Music by: Chandan Saxena; Vishnu Vikram
- Release date: 15 November 2019
- Running time: 123 minutes
- Country: India
- Language: Hindi

Bagpat Ka Dulha (lit. 'Groom from Bagpat') is a 2019 Indian Hindi-language romantic comedy film directed and co-written by Karan Kashyap. The plot is where no one wants Shiv Shukla and Anjali's marriage, even Shiv and Anjali. It is a comedy of errors, based in Baghpat, Uttar Pradesh.

== Plot ==
Cable operators and arch rivals Anjali Mishra (Ruchi Singh) and Shiva Shukla (Jae Singh) are dead against the idea of them getting married and so are their families, who have been locking horns for generations. But, fate has different plans altogether.

== Cast ==
- Raza Murad
- Ravi Jhankal
- Shubham Teotia
- Jae Sing
- Asrar Khan as an announcer

== Soundtrack ==
No.	Title	Singer(s)	Length
1.	"Jaha Baith Jaye"	Shabab Sabri
2.	"Bagpat Ka Dulha Hai Yeh"	Javed Ali
3.	"Dilbar Humara Kab Huaa"	Mona Bhatt
4.	"Chhoti Umariya Me"	Rashmi Paniker
5.	"Khuda Tu Sun Raha Hai"	Anurag Naik
