= Sridevi (unreleased film) =

- Film poster
- Directed by: J. D. Chakravarthy
- Produced by: Ram Gopal Varma
- Starring: Anukriti Govind Sharma
- Cinematography: Harsh Shroff
- Edited by: Nagendra Adapa
- Music by: J. D. Chakravarthy
- Country: India
- Language: Telugu

Sridevi is an unreleased Indian Telugu film, about a teenaged boy's crush on a woman older than himself, starring Anukriti Govind Sharma in the title role. The original title of the film was Savitri. It is directed by J. D. Chakravarthy and presented by Ram Gopal Varma.

== Cast ==
- Anukriti Govind Sharma

== Production ==
On 3 October 2014 Ram Gopal Varma announced that his next film was to be called Savitri. In a press release, he launched a contest named "Who is your Savitri?", asking for genuine stories of teenage crushes on teachers, neighbours, or other adults. He also released the poster of the film. On 5 October 2014, Varma announced through a press release that the film's title had been changed to Sridevi and the posters were re-released with a change in the title.

Anukriti Govind Sharma, a fashion model and actress, was selected to play the title role of the older woman who becomes the target of the boy's crush.

== Controversy ==
=== Poster ===
A poster released on 3 October 2014 portrayed the bare stomach of a sari-clad woman, and a young boy looking at her navel. The poster was criticised both for its objectification of the woman's body, and for perceived sexualisation of the child. The State Child Rights Protection Commission recognised the matter suo motu and released a statement claiming that the poster was vulgar and violated children's rights under Section 292 sub-clauses (I) and (II) of the Indian Penal Code. The Commission for the Protection of Child Rights issued notices to the Police Commissioner to prevent display of the poster, and the Censor Board and the director seeking an explanation.

On 6 October 2014, members of the city committees of AIDWA, SFI, DYFI arranged a protest meeting where they burnt an effigy of the director and requested actions against him and against the censor board for allowing the film to be created in the first place. One area of particular concern was the portrayal of female teachers in film.

Varma responded to the protests, stating that the attraction of the child in the film for his teacher was a representation of the attraction he himself had held for his teacher when he was young. He claimed that he had discussed the issue with his former teacher, who did not object, and that the boy in the film had had his parents present while filming, and argued that this removed any allegations of impropriety.

The State Child Rights Protection Commission filed a report with the police commissioner, asking for an explanation of the case. Varma replied to the commission asking for the case to be closed.

=== Title ===
The film's original title Savitri was already registered by Neelima Tirumalasetti, who was producing a family drama film with this title starring Nara Rohit in the lead role and directed by Pawan Sadineni. The day after Varma announced his film, Tirumalasetti released a statement, where she reported that her team had requested that Varma's film should change its title. Two days later, Varma changed the title to Sridevi and released new film posters reflecting the change. The actress Sridevi protested against the new title, and her husband Boney Kapoor contacted Varma about it, sending a legal notice requesting that the name Sridevi not be used in the title of the film.
