= Nanda Nanditha (2008 film) =

- Film poster
- Directed by: B. N. Vijayakumar
- Written by: Ajay Kumar
- Produced by: Ramesh Kashyap
- Starring: Yogesh; Swetha
- Cinematography: Mathew Rajan
- Edited by: K. M. Prakash
- Music by: Emil
- Production company: Simhadri Productions
- Release date: 13 March 2008
- Running time: 141 minutes
- Country: India
- Language: Kannada

Nanda Nanditha (alternatively Nanda Loves Nanditha) is a 2008 Indian Kannada language romantic action drama film directed by B. N. Vijayakumar starring Yogesh and Swetha. The film was remade into a Tamil and Telugu as a bilingual movie titled as Nanda Nanditha (2012).

== Cast ==
- Yogesh as Nanda
- Swetha as Nanditha
- Avinash as Nanda's father
- Suresh Chandra
- Suneetha Shetty
- Shobha
- Jayabalu
- Girija Lokesh

== Soundtrack ==
The songs were composed by Emil.

No.	Title	Singer(s)	Length
1.	"Byada Alabyada"	Hemanth	5:02
2.	"Jinke Marina"	Emil, Ranjith, Karthik, Srinivas	4:56
3.	"Kokkoko Koli"	Malathy, Srinivas	4:26
4.	"Kulladali Keelyavudo"	Hemanth	4:20
5.	"Pacchagili Hene"	Tippu, Harini	4:39
6.	"Preethi Bandaithe"	Karthik, Shahanaj	5:11
Total length:			28:35

== Reception and legacy ==
R. G. Vijayasarathy of Rediff.com gave the film a rating of two out of five stars and wrote that "Other than Mathew Rajan's photography, there is nothing much to write about".

After the film's success, Swetha appended Nanditha to her stage name and was fondly called jinke mari (transl. Little deer) in Karnataka, after one of the film's songs.
