= Faisal Saif =

Indian film director (1976–2022)

- Born: 27 April 1976; Mumbai, Maharashtra, India
- Died: 13 September 2022 (aged 46)
- Occupations: Film director, screenwriter, film critic
- Years active: 2006–2022
- Awards: Indianapolis LGBT Film Festival Best Story (2006); Indian Leadership Conclave Best Director (2015)

Faisal Saif (27 April 1976 – 13 September 2022) was an Indian film director, film critic and writer. He began his film career as an assistant director on Aur Ek Prem Kahani, Angaar and Grahan. He mostly chose controversial horror themes and stories for his films and directed Jigyaasa, Main Hoon Part-Time Killer and Islamic Exorcist.

== Life and career ==
Saif was born in Mumbai on 27 April 1976. He started his career as an independent music video director. He directed videos for Catrack Music and Vital Records.

Saif made his first feature film Come December in 2003 which received the International Special Award of Cultural Vision in storytelling from the Indianapolis LGBT Film Festival. He then made Jigyaasa (2006). India media believed that Jigyaasa was based on the life of the sex symbol Mallika Sherawat, but Faisal has denied this. He made the film Paanch Ghantey Mien Paanch Crore with Pakistani actor Meera.

Faisal was also co-editor of Global Movie magazine and a film critic and feature writer for Bollywood for a number of news portals.

During creative sessions with veteran filmmaker Rituparno Ghosh while he was directing Chitrangada: The Crowning Wish in 2012, Saif discussed having a transgender antagonist dealing their gender identity with Ghosh, something which Saif later incorporated in his upcoming film Amma. The character is played by acclaimed actor Rajpal Yadav.

== Awards and honors ==
- In 2006, Saif won the Best Story in cultural vision international award for his Festival Film Come December from Indianapolis LGBT Film Festival.
- Network 7 Media Group awarded Saif the "Best Director" title in 2015 at the 6th Annual Indian Leadership Conclave.

== Controversies ==
=== Main Hoon Rajinikanth ===
On 17 September 2014, Tamil actor Rajinikanth moved the Madras High Court to stop the release and screening of the film Main Hoon Part-Time Killer directed by Saif stating that various press releases, video releases, web articles, posters and information from other sources about this film revealed that the producer had lifted/exploited the image of Rajinikanth from various movies by including in the forthcoming feature film.

Saif, after filing counter to the case denied the allegation about the film being a biopic on the superstar, He also stated he hasn't used any names/image/likeness/caricature and the case being filed on the film is baseless and done with lack of knowledge.

On 3 February 2015, Madras High Court ruled out the decision in favor of Rajinikanth and restricted Faisal against using the actor's name in his upcoming film. Saif, however agreed finally to change his film's title under the pressure of his film's producers.

=== Bigg Boss 8 ===
On 20 November 2014, Saif was supposed to enter the Indian reality show Bigg Boss as a Wild Card contestant Saif, however praised the show by refusing his participation and quoted "Why would I be a wild card contestant when Rajinikanth has proved the world that I am a strongest contender?".

=== For Adults Only ===
In 2015, Saif announced plans to make a film titled For Adults Only. Few details were released about the nature of the proposed film, but media outlets quoted Saif in describing it as "bold" and "dirty". On social media outlet Facebook, Saif called the film "The most dirtiest film you'll ever see". Saif planned to write and direct the film, and said that the film was slated for production by Dimension Pictures, which would have been the company's first Bollywood film, according to Saif. The film was planned to be produced in Hindi, Telugu and Tamil.

Saif was looking to cast an international actress as the main character in the film and ultimately chose Dubai-based actress Andria D'Souza for the lead role.

On 1 September 2015, Saif officially announced that the film had been shelved in deference to conservative Indian sentiments and the Indian censor board.

== Filmography ==
†	Denotes films that have not yet been released

=== As director and writer ===
Year	Film	Language	Notes
2006	Jigyaasa	Hindi	
2006	Come December	Hindi, English	Indianapolis LGBT Film Festival Award Winner
2012	Paanch Ghantey Mien Paanch Crore	Hindi	
2015	Main Hoon Part-Time Killer	Hindi	
2015	Amma †	Hindi, Kannada	On Hold
2017	Islamic Exorcist	English	
2020	Danger †	Hindi	On Hold

=== As producer ===
Year	Film	Language	Notes	Director
2017	Sheitaan	Urdu		Sameer Khan

=== Web series ===
Year	Name	Role	Platform
2020	Kavita Bhabhi	Creator, director	Ullu App, MX Player
2020	Bhookh	Creator, director	Fliz Movies
2020	Blue Whale	Creator, director	
2020	Ashuddhi	Creator, director	
