= Vijay Gutte =

Indian film director and producer

- Occupations: Film director and producer
- Father: Ratnakar Gutte

Vijay Ratnakar Gutte is an Indian film director and producer. He is the son of MLA Ratnakar Gutte from Gangakhed constituency of the Maharashtra Legislative Assembly. He is known for directing the 2019 film The Accidental Prime Minister starring Anupam Kher and Akshaye Khanna. The film was based on a memoir of the same name about former prime minister Manmohan Singh by Sanjaya Baru. He has also produced the films Badmashiyaan, The Film Emotional Atyachar, and Time Bara Vait.

== Filmography ==
Year	Film	Director	Writer	Producer
2010	The Film Emotional Atyachar	No	No	Yes
2015	Time Bara Vait	No	No	Yes
2015	Badmashiyaan	No	No	Yes
2019	The Accidental Prime Minister	Yes	Yes	No
