= The Accidental Prime Minister (film) =

- Theatrical release poster
- Directed by: Vijay Gutte
- Written by: Vijay Ratnkar Gutte; Mayank Tewari; Karl Dunne; Aditya Sinha
- Story by: Nitish R. Kadam
- Based on: The Accidental Prime Minister by Sanjaya Baru
- Produced by: Sunil Bohra; Dhaval Gada
- Starring: Anupam Kher; Akshaye Khanna; Suzanne Bernert
- Cinematography: Sachin K. Krishn
- Edited by: Praveen K. L.
- Music by: Songs: Sadhu Tiwari (India); Sudip Roy (UK); Score: Sumit Sethi; Abhijit Vaghani
- Production companies: Rudra Productions; Bohra Bros.; Pen Studios
- Release date: 11 January 2019
- Running time: 110 minutes
- Country: India
- Language: Hindi
- Box office: ₹22.65 crore

The Accidental Prime Minister is a 2019 Indian Hindi-language film directed by Vijay Ratnakar Gutte and written by Mayank Tewari, based on the 2014 memoir of the same name by Sanjaya Baru. It was produced by the Bohra Bros under Rudra Production (UK), in association with Jayantilal Gada under the banner of Pen India Limited. It stars Anupam Kher as Dr. Manmohan Singh, the 13th Prime Minister of India from 2004 to 2014 under the Indian National Congress-led United Progressive Alliance.

The film was released on 11 January 2019.

== Plot ==
Based on the memoir The Accidental Prime Minister by Indian policy analyst Sanjaya Baru, the film explores the tenure of Manmohan Singh as the prime minister of India, and the interference of the Indian National Congress in contradicting his decisions during his first tenure. It details how Singh fell victim to the Indian National Congress's "dynastic approach" and highlights how Manmohan Singh was constantly ignored by the Congress to maintain turf for Rahul Gandhi, the son of Sonia Gandhi.

== Cast ==
- Anupam Kher as Manmohan Singh
- Akshaye Khanna as Sanjaya Baru
- Suzanne Bernert as Sonia Gandhi
- Aahana Kumra as Priyanka Gandhi
- Arjun Mathur as Rahul Gandhi
- Divya Seth as Gursharan Kaur
- Avtar Sahni as L. K. Advani
- Ajit Sat as P. V. Narasimha Rao
- Ram Avatar Bhardawaj as Atal Bihari Vajpayee
- Anasuya Mazumder as Mamata Banerjee
- Vimal Verma as Lalu Prasad Yadav
- Anil Rastogi as Shivraj Patil
- Chitragupta Sinha as P. V. Ranga Rao
- Vipin Sharma as Ahmed Patel
- Shiv Kumar Subramaniam as P. Chidambaram
- Munish Bhardwaj as Kapil Sibal
- Ram Avtar as Atal Bihari Vajpayee
- Sunil Kothari as A. P. J. Abdul Kalam
- Atul Kumar as Jyotindra Nath Dixit
- Anish Kuruvilla as T. K. A. Nair
- Prakash Belawadi as M. K. Narayanan
- Madan Joshi as Brajesh Mishra
- Pradeep Chakravarti as Pranab Mukherjee
- Yogesh Tripathy as Natwar Singh
- Bobby Parvez as Pulok Chatterji
- Anil Zankar as Sitaram Yechury
- Hansal Mehta as Naveen Patnaik
- Deepak Gheewala as N. Ram
- Naval Shukla as Yashwant Sinha
- Deepak Dadwal as Jaswant Singh
- Ashok Sagar Bhagat as Arjun Singh
- Ramesh Bhatkar as Prithviraj Chavan
- Subhash Tyagi as Mulayam Singh Yadav
- Manoj Tiger as Amar Singh
- Adarsh Gautam as Yousaf Raza Gilani
- Chembur Hari as A. K. Antony
- Kishor Jaykar as George Fernandes
- Aazam Khan as Ghulam Nabi Azad
- Vijay Singh as Bhairon Singh Shekhawat
- Askari Naqvi as Vir Sanghvi
- Pradeep Kuckreja as Prakash Karat
- Gull Jolly as Daman Singh
- Archna Sharma as Chiki Sarkar
- Sandeep Dhabale as Arnab Goswami
- Poorti Arya as One of the Reporters
- Senaya Sharma as One of the Reporters
- Apurva Nemlekar as One of the Reporters
- Narendra Modi as himself (cameo appearance)
- Manmohan Singh as himself (cameo appearance)

== Production ==
In 2017, former Central Board of Film Certification chief Pahlaj Nihalani had said that the filmmakers needed to obtain no-objection certificates from former prime minister Manmohan Singh and Indian National Congress President Rahul Gandhi for the film.

Principal photography begun on 31 March 2018 in London. The London-based shooting schedule concluded on 21 April 2018. In India, most of the shoot occurred in New Delhi which later wrapped up on 4 July 2018.

== Marketing and release ==
The first look of the film was released on 6 June 2017 through Anupam Kher's official Twitter handle. A new poster of the film was released on 27 December 2018, giving an 11 January 2019 release date. A new look poster of the film was released by TAP official on 3 January 2019.

The ruling Bharatiya Janata Party promoted the trailer through their official Twitter account. Reacting to this, a Congress spokesperson alleged that the film was "political propaganda". Upon the release of the trailer, the Congress party's Maharashtra youth wing in a letter to the producers of the film raised objections for the "incorrect presentation of the facts" and demanded a special screening of the film. They later withdrew the letter, intending to not publicize the film.

On 2 January 2019, lead actor Anupam Kher tweeted that people were reporting that the film's trailer was unseen as a top search result while being directly searched for on YouTube. The newspaper India Today conducted their own search, and confirmed Kher's allegations, noting that only on the following day did the trailer return to its position as a top search result. This led to speculation that the trailer had initially been removed intentionally as part of an anti-propaganda campaign. On 8 January 2019, a local court in Bihar ordered an FIR against Anupam Kher and thirteen other associated with the film for defaming political leaders.

The Hindi version film was released on 11 January 2019 on 1300 screens in India and 140 in overseas. The Tamil and Telugu dubbed versions released on 18 January 2019.

== Soundtrack ==
The Accidental Prime Minister

Soundtrack album by Sadhu Tiwari
- Released: 9 January 2019
- Recorded: 2018
- Genre: Feature Film Soundtrack
- Language: Hindi
- Label: Pen India Limited
External audio
- Om Shabd Video Song on YouTube

The single track is composed by Sandhu Tiwari while lyrics are written by Nagarjun.

Track listing
No.	Title	Lyrics	Music	Singer(s)	Length
1.	"Om Shabd"	Nagarjun	Sandhu Tiwari	Sandhu Tiwari	3:37
Total length:					3:37

== Reception ==
The Economic Times has given the film 3.5 stars out of 5, describing the film as "well-crafted" and Kher's portrayal of Manmohan Singh "a convincing act".

Utkarsh Mishra reviewing the film for Rediff.com, gives the film 3.5 stars out of 5, observes that the movie if carefully watched comes out as "well made", he criticises Kher for over dramatising Singh's walking style.

Saibal Chatterjee of NDTV gave the film 1.5 stars out of 5, noting that “The Accidental Prime Minister is neither hugely entertaining nor engagingly dramatic.” Shubra Gupta of The Indian Express sums up the retort: "The Accidental Prime Minister is an out-an-out propaganda film, created for the specific purpose of making the former prime minister look like a weak, spineless man, a puppet whose strings were controlled by then Indian National Congress President Sonia Gandhi".

The Times of India's Ronak Kotecha gave the film 3.5 stars out of 5 stating "Bollywood has produced several political dramas that are intense, complex and dark, The Accidental Prime Minister has all of that in measured tones." Koimoi's Umesh Punwani gave the film 2 stars out of 5 stating "A Silent Disappointment. Akshaye Khanna is outstanding. I could just watch this movie again to fast-forward and go through just his scenes."

Ajaz Ashraf writing for the Firstpost felt that the trailer of the film seemed to suggest that Sanjaya Baru was the media adviser and chief spokesperson of Manmohan Singh during 2011 Indian anti-corruption movement. However, Baru was only in this position during May 2004 to August 2008. The book ends in May 2009 when UPA returned to power following 2009 Indian general election. Baru had written 14-page epilogue with speculations and questions which is used as a pivotal subject in the film.

== See also ==
- PM Narendra Modi
- Pradhanmantri
