= Sanjaya Baru =

Indian political commentator and analyst

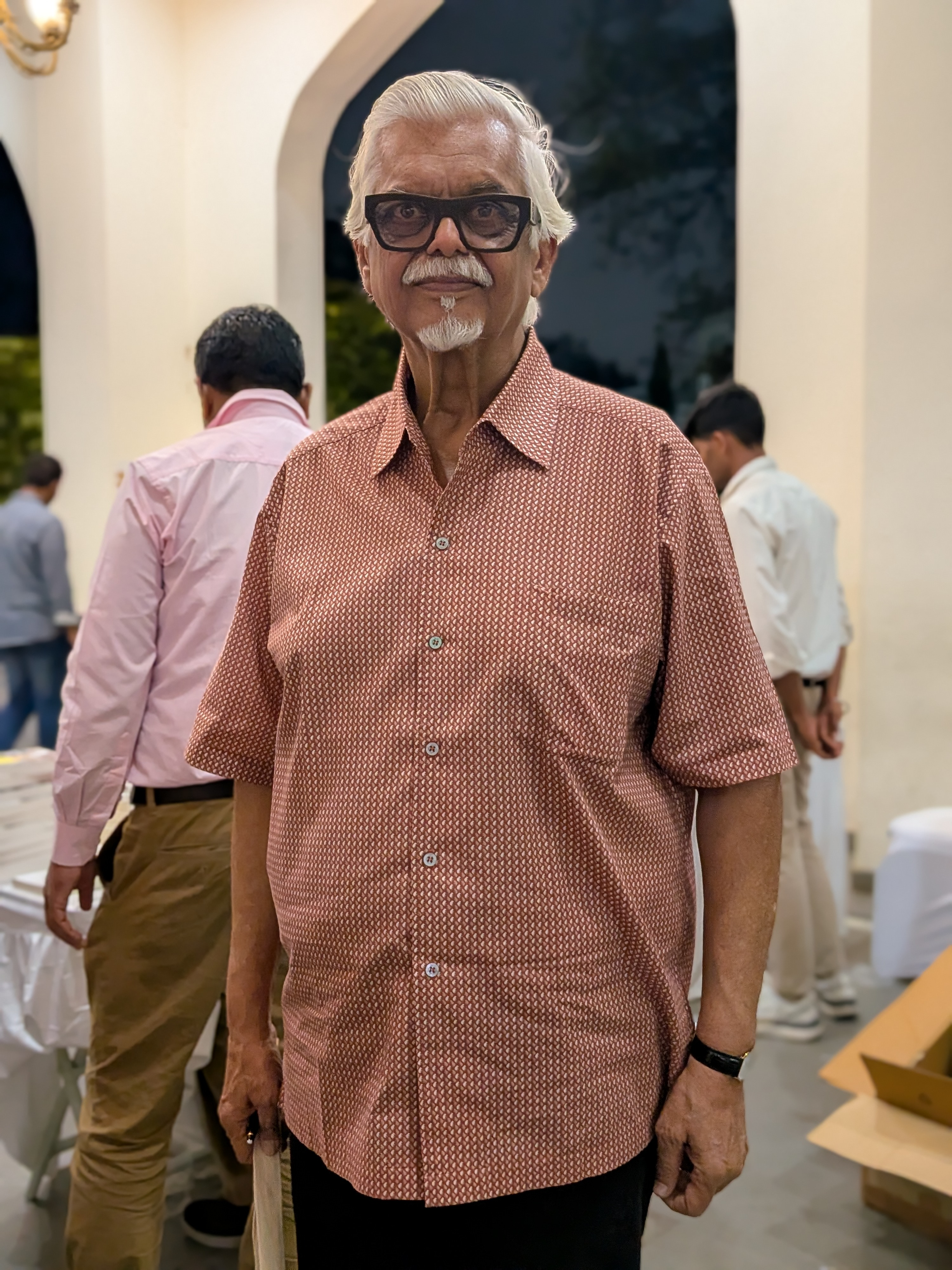

Media Advisor to the Prime Minister of India
- In office May 2004 – August 2008

Secretary General of Federation of Indian Chambers of Commerce and Industry
- In office 1 September 2017 – 17 April 2018
- Preceded by: Alwyn Didar Singh
- Succeeded by: Dilip Chenoy

Editor of Business Standard
- In office 2010–2011
- Preceded by: T.N. Ninan
- Succeeded by: Ashok K Bhattacharya

Personal details
- Parent: B. P. R. Vithal (father)
- Education: Centre for Development Studies (MPhil); Jawaharlal Nehru University (MA, PhD)

Sanjaya Baru is a political commentator and policy analyst. He served as Secretary General of the Federation of Indian Chambers of Commerce and Industry (FICCI) until his resignation in April 2018. Prior to this, he was Director for Geo-Economics and Strategy at the International Institute of Strategic Studies. He was Prime Minister Manmohan Singh's media advisor and chief spokesperson (PMO) from May 2004 until August 2008.

Baru writes a column for Civil Society Magazine called Delhi Darbar.

== Early life and education ==
Sanjaya Baru was born in May 1954 at Hyderabad. He studied at the St. George's Grammar School (Hyderabad) and at The Hyderabad Public School, Begumpet. He then graduated from Nizam College, Hyderabad. He earned a Master of Philosophy from the Centre for Development Studies and later a Doctor of Philosophy from the Jawaharlal Nehru University.

Baru's father, B. P. R. Vithal, was a member of the Hyderabad Civil Service and later the Indian Administrative Service of the 1950 batch and was the Finance and Planning Secretary in the Government of Undivided Andhra Pradesh. He also set up the Centre for Economic and Social Studies.

== Career ==
=== Journalism ===
He has been Chief Editor of the Indian financial newspaper Business Standard, chief editor of The Financial Express and associate editor of The Economic Times and The Times of India.

=== Academics ===
He has served as Visiting Professor at the Lee Kuan Yew School of Public Policy and the Institute of South Asian Studies, Singapore (2008-09). He was also a Professor at the Indian Council for Research in International Economic Relations (1999-2000). He also served as Professor at the Departments of Economics at the Jawaharlal Nehru University (1985-86) and the University of Hyderabad (1979-1990).

=== Prime Minister's Office ===
During the tenure of Prime Minister Manmohan Singh, a new post was created named "Spokesman and Media Advisor to the Prime Minister", which was equivalent to Additional Secretary to the Government of India in Prime Minister's Office, where Sanjaya served from 2004-2008.

== The Accidental Prime Minister ==
In April 2014, Penguin India published The Accidental Prime Minister, Baru's tell-all memoir about his time at the Prime Minister's Office. In it, Baru alleges that the prime minister was completely subservient to Congress President Sonia Gandhi, who wielded significant influence in the running of the Singh administration, including the PMO itself. The book sparked off a controversy, with the office officially denouncing it as "fiction". Baru has said that he set out to show an empathetic portrait of the prime minister.

== Works ==
- The Political Economy of Indian Sugar: State Intervention and Structural Change (1990)
- Strategic consequences of India's economic performance (2006)
- The Accidental Prime Minister: The Making and Unmaking of Manmohan Singh
- 1991: How P.V. Narasimha Rao Made History by Sanjaya Baru (2016)
- India and the World: Essays on Geoeconomics and Foreign Policy (2016)
- India's Power Elite (2021)
- The Importance Of Shinzo Abe (2023)
- Secession of the successful: The Flight out of New India (2025)

== In popular culture ==
Based on Baru's book The Accidental Prime Minister Rudra Production Limited and Pen Studios released a film of the same name in January 2019 in which he has been portrayed by Akshaye Khanna.
