= India Reloaded: Inside India's Resurgent Consumer Market =

2015 book by Dheeraj Sinha

India Reloaded
- Author: Dheeraj Sinha
- Language: English
- Genre: Marketing
- Publisher: Palgrave Macmillan
- Publication date: 2015
- Publication place: India
- Media type: Print (Hardback)
- ISBN: 978-1137367099

India Reloaded: Inside India's Resurgent Consumer Market is a 2015 book that was written by Dheeraj Sinha. It was first published on July 24, 2015, through Palgrave Macmillan and examines India' consumer market.

== Summary ==
In the book Sinha reviews data from several outlets in order to examine success in the Indian consumer market. He also looks at several myths and contradictions surrounding this market and draws upon his own experiences.

== Reception ==
Brand Equity wrote a mostly favorable review, criticizing Sinha for utilizing "bland business terms" while commending him for the "range and breadth of sources from which Dheeraj draws his data points, and mines them for insight." The Business Standard was mixed, writing "Some parts of the book are a bit tedious, especially when the author discusses political developments in great detail and describes Hindi films to show how popular culture reflects the changed thinking of consumers. But one thing is certain - if you want to understand the Indian mindset and how consumer psychology works, the book provides the on-ground realities and challenges for brands."
