= Shagird =

Shagird (lit. 'Disciple') may refer to:

- Shagird (1967 film), an Indian Hindi-language comedy drama film
- Shagird (2011 film), an Indian Hindi-language action thriller film
