= Katha Screenplay Darsakatvam Appalaraju =

- Directed by: Ram Gopal Varma
- Written by: Ram Gopal Varma; Nilesh Girkar
- Produced by: Kiran Kumar Koneru
- Starring: Sunil; Swati Reddy; Brahmanandam
- Cinematography: Sudhakar Reddy Yakkanti
- Edited by: Bhanodaya; Prawin Pudi
- Music by: Koti
- Distributed by: Shreya Films
- Release date: 18 February 2011
- Country: India
- Language: Telugu

Katha Screenplay Darsakatvam Appalaraju (transl. Story screenplay and direction by Appalaraju) is a 2011 Indian Telugu-language satire comedy film written and directed by Ram Gopal Varma. It stars Sunil and Swati Reddy in the lead roles, alongside Brahmanandam and Kota Srinivasa Rao. Sudhakar Reddy has handled the camera and Koti has composed the music.

== Plot ==
Appalaraju, a film lover, watches films regularly at Rambha Theatre in Amalapuram wondering why the directors are bringing out such films. His life's ambition is to direct a film better than all the established directors. He leaves for Hyderabad and stays in his friend's house, with his script titled Nayaki. His friend takes him to an audio release function, where he meets a producer called Rakhee. He and his creative head Pushpanand reads the script and suggest some changes. But Appalaraju does not agree to change even a single word in it. Then Rakhee suggests Appalaraju to convince the top heroine of the film industry Kanishka as her nod would help them fetch financiers.

Somehow, Appalaraju meets the heroine and narrates the story and she agrees to do the film. Then Rakhee, Pushpanand and Appalaraju meet Data Base to Finance their film. He wants one of the top heroes, Babu Garu to be roped in for the lead role so that the combination would help achieve a hit. Appalaraju pleads with Kanishka and she convinces Babu Garu and Data Base agrees to invest on the film. However, due to some differences with Kanishka, Babu Garu quits the project and Data Base refuses to finance the film. Now, Rakhee and Appalaraju meet Srisailam Anna, who is basically a rowdy sheeter to finance the film. He agrees to finance the film with the condition, that only lyrics penned by him should be used in it. Luck again favors Appalaraju as Kanishka convinces another top hero KT to pair up with her. Rahman Sharma scores tunes for the lyrics penned by Srisailam Anna and in order to attract the mass audiences, the hero KT insists on keeping an item number in the film. With no option left, Appalaraju agrees to it. The shooting of the film completes and before the release of the film, the producer invites the media to write reviews in their favor.

However, Babu Garu turns the tables and makes the entire media against the film. Now, the producers start searching for a distributor and meet Ontikannu Gavarraju, but he wants the promos in a different manner, with much exposure of heroine and the hero in an attractive manner. But Appalaraju refuses to change the promos. Gavarraju refuses to distribute the film first but changes his mind after meeting Babu Garu and agrees to take distribution rights across the state. In the last minutes, Gavarraju cheats the producer and refuses to release the film. Again, Rakhee and Appalaraju meet Data Base to distribute the film and he accepts their proposal. KT insists that the film should be released on the same day when Babu Garu"s film 'Pranam Teesta" is releasing during Sankranti season. With all the options closed, Babu Garu wants to stop the release of the film at any cost. Y Venkat, a director, gives an idea to burn the negatives of the film. Mistakenly, they burn another film's negative and Nayaki has a smooth release and becomes a big hit to the surprise of Appalaraju. Nayaki bags awards for all the departments, too. The biggest surprise is that Appalaraju wants to bring out a tragic and heart-touching film, but he bags the award for a comedy entertainer. Though initially saddened, that his original script was butchered, he starts dancing in joy along with the rest of the crew. The movie ends with Appalaraju and Krishna dancing to the remix version of the item song used in the film.

== Cast ==
- Sunil as Appalaraju
- Swati Reddy as Krishna Reddy
- Brahmanandam as Sri Sailam Anna
- Ali as Ringtone Rahman Sharma
- M. S. Narayana as Gogineni Venkataramana Rao
- Kota Srinivasa Rao as Onti Kannu Gavarraju
- Aadarsh Balakrishna as Babu Garu
- Tanikella Bharani as Y. Venkat
- Aamir Tameem as Rudraveena
- Sakshi Gulati as Kanishka
- Venu Madhav as Gannu
- Thagubothu Ramesh as Fan
- Tanu Roy as Sarala
- Chalapathi Rao as Uppalraju
- Raghu Babu as Rakhi
- Harsha Vardhan as Pushpanand
- Suman Setty as Annamacharya
- Ajay as KT
- Raja Ravindra as E.V.
- Krishna Bhagawan as Data Base
- Krishnudu as Banda
- Jaya Prakash Reddy as Narsing
- Kovai Sarala
- Dharmavarapu Subramanyam
- Narsing Yadav
- Ravi Teja as Seenu, a body double of Teja (cameo appearance)

== Production ==
The film was launched at Annapoorna Studios, Hyderabad by Ram Gopal Varma who makes a comeback to Tollywood after 12 years. Nagarjuna, Sridevi and K. Raghavendra Rao were the guests at the launch.

== Reception ==
Rediff.com's Radhika Rajamani rated the film 2 stars of 5 and wrote: "Though the film is an attempt to show the happenings in the industry, it was not done well. People not familiar with the industry may not 'get' what the director is trying to say." Hemanth of 123 Telugu rated 2.75/5 and stated: "KSD Appalaraju is a fine example of how curiosity can kill the cat. It does make an interesting watch if you know about the characters and exactly whom to relate to. However ironic it may sound, the film is seriously tragic at its core."

== Soundtrack ==
The music of the film is composed by Koti. Ram Gopal Varma has written lyrics for a song.

No.	Title	Performer(s)	Length
1.	"Luck To Siva Cinema"	Srikanth
2.	"Maya Bazaaru"	Srikanth
3.	"Naa Peru Srisailam"	Brahmanandam
4.	"Emetti Penchare"	Geetha Madhuri, Simha
5.	"Unbelievable"	Swati Reddy, Mynampati Sreeram Chandra
6.	"Ring Roadu"	Hemachandra, Geetha Madhuri
7.	"Publicity"	Ranjith
8.	"Kottukundam Thittukundam"	Koti, Geetha Madhuri, Sai
