= India's Power Elite =

Book by Sanjaya Baru

India’s Power Elite
- First edition
- Author: Sanjaya Baru
- Subject: Politics
- Published: April 2021 (Penguin)
- Publication place: India
- Media type: Book
- Pages: 264
- ISBN: 978-0670092444

India’s Power Elite is a 2021 political commentary book by Indian policy analyst Sanjaya Baru. The book is a study of the nature of elitism in postcolonial India and focuses on the disruption brought about by the rise of BJP in India after 2014 general elections.
