= Ek Paheli Leela =

2015 Hindi film directed by Bobby Khan

- Theatrical release poster
- Directed by: Bobby Khan
- Written by: Bobby Khan; Bunty Rathore (Dialogues)
- Produced by: Bhushan Kumar; Krishan Kumar; Ahmed Khan; Shaira Khan
- Starring: Sunny Leone; Jay Bhanushali; Rajneesh Duggal; Rahul Dev; Mohit Ahlawat
- Cinematography: Bashalal Syed
- Edited by: Nitin FCP
- Music by: Songs: Meet Bros Anjjan; Amaal Mallik; Dr. Zeus; Tony Kakkar; Uzair Jaswal; Background Score: Mannan Munjal
- Production companies: Paper Doll Entertainment; T-Series
- Distributed by: AA Films
- Release date: 10 April 2015
- Running time: 144 minutes
- Country: India
- Languages: Hindi; Rajasthani
- Budget: ₹150 million
- Box office: est. ₹274.7 million

Ek Paheli Leela (transl. Leela, a riddle) is a 2015 Indian Hindi-language romantic thriller drama film, directed and co-written by Bobby Khan and produced by Bhushan Kumar and Krishan Kumar. It stars Sunny Leone in the titular lead role with Jay Bhanushali, Rajneesh Duggal, Jas Arora, Mohit Ahlawat and Rahul Dev in pivotal roles. Choreography is done by Ahmed Khan and Jojo Khan. The music for the film is composed by Meet Bros Anjjan and Amaal Mallik. Principal photography of the film began in Jodhpur, India.

The film is a reincarnation story which is set 300 years back, and revolves around the story of a young woman named Leela (Sunny Leone) and her lover. Their love story remains incomplete as they are murdered. The film portrays how their story completes when they both are reincarnated in present time.

The trailer of the film was released on 6 February 2015 and became YouTube's most viewed Bollywood movie trailer of the first quarter of 2015. The film received mixed to negative reviews from the critics upon release and ultimately emerged as a commercial failure.

== Plot ==
Karan (Jay Bhanushali) is a singer/musician who moves into a new house in Mumbai along with his friends. He often helps his sister Radhika (Shivani Tanksale) and Andy (VJ Andy), her colleague (both are fashion photographers), with music for their fashion shows.

Radhika wants to get her friend Meera (Sunny Leone) for her fashion shows in India but Meera is reluctant. Hence, Radhika with the help of Andy tricks her to travel to India by making her drunk. After they arrive in India, Meera discovers the truth and gets angry. Meanwhile, her mood changes as she sees Rajasthani girls playing a traditional game and starts to play with them, forgetting her plight.

While in India, Meera meets royalty - Ranveer Singh (Mohit Ahlawat), a Rajput prince, in Rajasthan. The two eventually fall in love and get married. The prince is in the middle of a property dispute with his cousin, Bikram Singh (Jas Arora).

Meanwhile, Karan has persistent dreams of someone whipping him and many times he wakes up from his sleep loudly shouting "Leela! Leela!". In an attempt to figure out why, his friends take him to a Pandit (Naadi palm leaf reader) who tells him that his pain is rooted in his past life of 300 years ago.

With the help of the Pandit, Karan travels through his past and they find out that he must be Shravan (Rajneesh Duggal), who was in love with a girl called Leela (also played by Leone) but his master, an artist, Bhairao (Rahul Dev) adopts her as his muse. Bhairao makes a statue of Leela and discovers that Leela is in love with Shravan. In a fit of rage, Bhairao kills both Shravan and Leela by whipping shravan, hitting him with a hammer in the head and kills leela by pushing her off the ledge of his hideaway.

With advice from Pandit, Karan gets some courage to visit a place called Bhairao Virajana (the place of dispute between Ranveer and Bikram, who know that a statue of "Leela" is hidden in the midst of its ruins, which is worth a billion dollars.

Bikram finds out that Karan is trespassing on his property and brings him to Prince Ranveer to inform him that their property is now being invaded by strangers.

Inside the palace, Karan meets Meera and tries to remind her about their past but Meera does not believe him. Karan plays a song "Tere Bin" that takes Meera back into their past and she recollects her past life as the beautiful Leela... Bikram overhears the entire conversation and knows that the location of Leela's statue can be learnt by kidnapping Karan and Meera and forcing them to spill the beans.

With the help of his some henchmen, Meera and Karan get kidnapped by Bikram who is looking for the statue that Bhairao had made. The current market value of the statue is $10 billion and Bikram wants to keep the money for himself. Bikram starts harassing Meera so that she would tell him where the statue is hidden. Therefore under duress and to save Meera, Karan reveals that the statue was hidden behind a wall, and then when Bikram gets to the statue, Prince Ranveer arrives and stabs Bikram's hand with a sword.

In the end, Karan realizes that he is actually the reincarnation of Bhairao and not of Shravan (who has reincarnated as Ranveer). Karan tries to redeem his ills by committing suicide but Meera and Ranveer stop him.

Karan's album "Tere Bin" gets him fame and their story reached a conclusion.

== Cast ==
- Sunny Leone as Leela (first birth)/Meera Singh (reborn with same face and married to Ranveer)
- Rajneesh Duggal as Shravan (Leela's lover in her previous birth)
- Jay Bhanushali as Karan (reincarnation of Bhairao)
- Rahul Dev as Bhairao
- Mohit Ahlawat as Prince Ranveer Singh (rebirth of Shravan and now married to Meera)
- Jas Arora as Prince Bikram Singh
- Shivani Tanksale as Radhika Randhawa
- VJ Andy as himself
- Ahsaan Qureshi as Maan Singh
- Daniel Weber as Flight Pilot (Cameo appearance)
- Sandeep Bhojak as Jaswant Singh

== Production ==
The film is produced by Bhushan Kumar's company T-Series and Ahmed Khan's own production company Paperdoll Entertainment.

=== Development ===
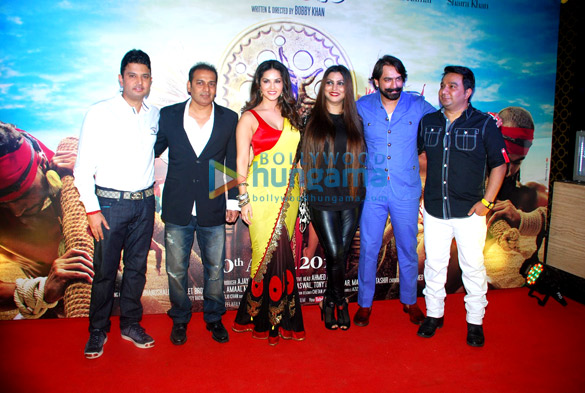
Sunny Leone with director and producers of the film at the trailer launch.

Bobby Khan stated that Sunny Leone was the only actress suitable for the roles . He also stated that big actors refused to do the film because of Leone. Actor Mohit Ahlawat returned to films after four years. Leone's husband Daniel Weber also had a cameo appearance in the film as flight attendant. As the film revisits two very different eras, the attire worn by Leone was also carefully designed. Leone's personal stylist Hitesh Kapopara who has also designed costumes for Leone for her previous films went for shopping in the local markets of London and Rajasthan for traditional accessories.

=== Filming ===
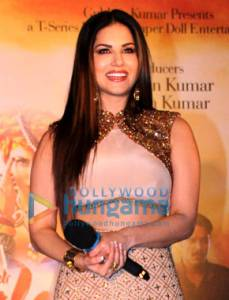
Leone at promotions of the film in Mumbai

The film was shot at various location including Mumbai, London and Rajasthan. In Rajasthan, it was filmed at remote interiors and villages. At Jodhpur, the sand dunes were also included in the shoot along with the villagers for a song sequence. A village was also created on the desert to commence the filming. The Khimsar Fort in Nagaur, Laxmi Niwas Palace of Bikaner were also included into the shots and were used as royal palace in the film. Reportedly, Sunny got skin infection on the sets as she has to shoot in the scorching heat and had rashes over the body. Leone also learnt Rajasthani dialect for the film. She attended workshops for the song "Dhol Baaje" and learnt classical dance steps from the veteran choreographer Saroj Khan. As per reports, she also had to bath with 100 litres of milk for a scene in the film.

== Soundtrack ==
The music for the film was composed by Dr. Zeus, Amaal Mallik, Meet Bros Anjjan, Tony Kakkar and Uzair Jaswal with lyrics penned by Kumaar, Manoj Muntashir and Tony Kakkar. The background score was composed by Mannan Munjal. The soundtrack comprises 9 songs. Ensemble singers like Tulsi Kumar, Arijit Singh, Kanika Kapoor, Monali Thakur, Meet Bros Anjjan, Mohit Chauhan, Neha Kakkar and Pakistani singer Uzair Jaswal have lent their voices for the film. The full soundtrack album was released on 10 March 2015.

== Reception ==
=== Box office ===
The film was released on 10 April 2015 with estimated occupancy of 20% On its opening day it collected ₹53.0 million (US$550,000) beating the opening day collections of films like NH10, Shamitabh and Detective Byomkesh Bakshy. On its second day, it collected around ₹52.0 million (US$540,000) taking its total to ₹105 million (US$1.1 million). The film showed further growth on its third day as it collected ₹53.5 million (US$560,000) nett to take its first weekend total to around ₹160 million (US$1.7 million) nett.
Till its second weekend, it managed to collect ₹243 million (US$2.5 million) nett. At the end of its theatrical run, Ek Paheli Leela grossed around ₹275 million (US$2.9 million) nett.

=== Critical reception ===
The Times of India gave the film 3 stars out of 5 and described the film as "colourful, crisp and convivial". Bollywood Hungama gave the film 3.5 stars out of 5 and praised the film's cinematography, direction, screenplay and stated, "On the whole, Ek Paheli Leela is worth watching, purely because of Sunny Leone and the way she has been presented... like never before!!!" DNA India gave the film 2 stars and applauded Sunny's transformation of two characters and film's music while stating that, "Sunny Leone fans will be in for a royal treat. If Sunny Leone gets your temperature rising then Leela won't disappoint. The New Indian Express gave the film three and a half stars praising film's narration and stated, "Stunningly mounted and sumptuously narrated, "Ek Paheli Leela" is a feast for the senses. Basha Lal's camera caresses Ms Leone's assets and the sand dunes of Jaisalmer with equal affection. It may not be revolutionary in concept or path-breaking in execution. But make no mistake. "Ek Paheli Leela" is the surprise of the year.
Mid-Day called it "semi-porn rubbish", while IBNLive gave it 1.5 stars stating that the dialog was full of crude sexual jokes and that it was "soft porn" emphasising the short skirts of the women and the physique of the men. The Hindustan Times said the film had a " ludicrous script" and "wooden" acting. India Today praised the cinematography and Leone's dancing. Mumbai Mirror called it " an insincere, lavish and titillating compilation of every item song ever made." Rediff stated although the film was poorly written and had many flaws in its execution, it succeeded at its purpose of being a one-woman show to highlight Leone. Indian Express gave the film zero stars stating "all this film wants to do is to exploit its leading lady's awe-inspiring stack... From as many angles as possible, the closer the better". NDTV called it a "vapid yarn about love, desire and obsession unfolds against good-looking backgrounds".

== See also ==
- Bollywood films of 2015
- Kuch Kuch Locha Hai
