= T. K. A. Nair =

Indian civil servant (born 1939)

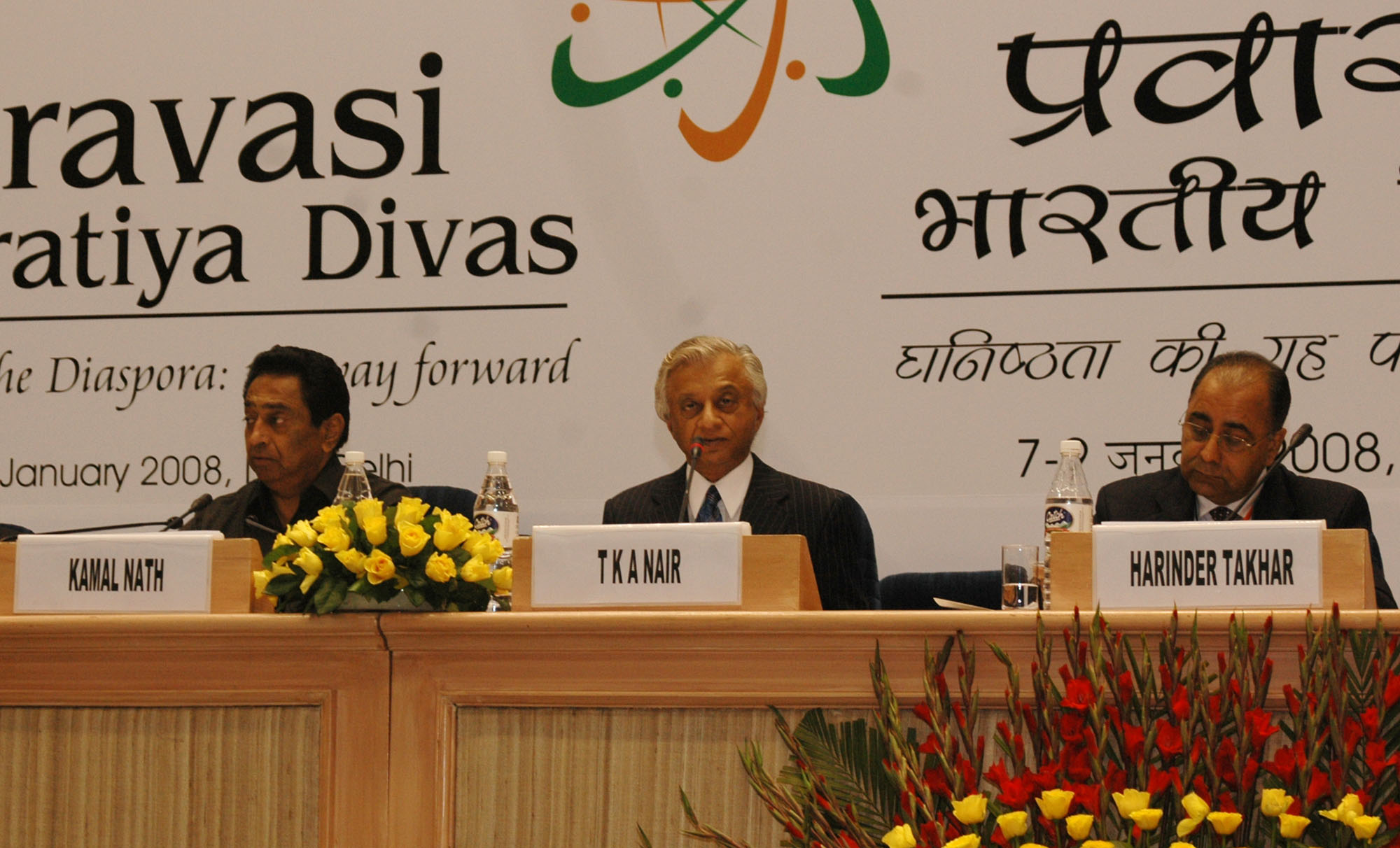
- T. K. A. Nair (centre)

12th Principal Secretary to the Prime Minister of India
- In office 28 May 2004 – 3 October 2011
- Prime Minister: Manmohan Singh
- Preceded by: Brajesh Mishra
- Succeeded by: Pulok Chatterji

Personal details
- Born: 1939 (age 87) Ayiroor, Quilon, Kingdom of Travancore (present day Ayiroor, Pathanamthitta, Kerala, India)
- Parent(s): Krishna Pillai; Bharathy Amma
- Education: Bachelor of Arts (Hons)
- Alma mater: University College, Thiruvananthapuram; National Academy of Administration, Mussoorie
- Occupation: Civil servant

Thottuvelil Krishna Pillai Ayyappan Nair (born 1939) is a career civil servant who formerly served as adviser to the Prime Minister of India with the rank of the Minister of State. He also previously served as Principal Secretary to Prime Minister of India.

He is a 1963 batch Indian Administrative Service officer from Punjab Cadre. He also presently serves as Member of Board of Governors of Indian Institute of Management Kozhikode and Centre for Research in Rural and Industrial Development, Chandigarh. He formerly served as Chairman of Kerala State Industrial Development Corporation.

== Early life and education ==
Ayappan Nair was born in Ayroor to Krishna Pillai and Bharathy Amma. He graduated with Bachelor of Arts (Honours) in History from the University College, Thiruvananthapuram.

== Career ==
He later served as the Chief Secretary of Punjab. and Secretary to Government of India in the Ministry of Environment & Forest. Later he served as Secretary in the Prime Minister’s Office during the terms of Inder Kumar Gujral and Atal Bihari Vajpayee.

Subsequently, he was Chairman of the Public Enterprises Selection Board which selects Chief Executives of India’s Public Sector Undertakings. He served as Principal Secretary and later as Advisor to Prime Minister Dr. Manmohan Singh from 2004 to 2014. Presently, he is the Managing Trustee of Citizens India Foundation which is a charitable trust and Executive Vice President of Kerala Blood Bank Society.

== Awards and honours ==
Year of award or honor	Name of award or honor	Awarding organization	Ref.
2015	Order of the Rising Sun, Gold and Silver Star	Government of Japan.	
2011	Excellence in Bureaucratic Service	World Malayalee Council.	
2010	Mar Gregorios Award	Archbishop Benedict Mar Gregorios Foundation.	
2010	A.K. Nair Memorial Award	A.K. Nair Memorial Endowment Committee and North Malabar Chamber of Commerce.	
2009	K.P.S. Menon Memorial Award	Sri Chettur Sankaran Nair Trust.	

== See also ==
- The Accidental Prime Minister
