= Mahadev Jankar =

Indian politician

Member of Legislative Council of Maharashtra
- In office 30 January 2015 – 27 July 2024
- Preceded by: Ashish Shelar
- Succeeded by: Yogesh Tilekar

Minister for Animal Husbandry, Dairy and Fisheries Development Maharashtra State
- In office 8 July 2016 – 9 November 2019
- Preceded by: Eknath Khadse
- Succeeded by: Sunil Chhatrapal Kedar

Personal details
- Born: 19 April 1968 (age 58) Maan, Maharashtra, India
- Party: Rashtriya Samaj Paksha
- Education: B.Tech. Electrical Engineering (Gold Medalist)
- Alma mater: Walchand College of Engineering
- Occupation: Politician
- As of January 23, 2015

Mahadev Jagannath Jankar is an Indian politician from Rashtriya Samaj Paksha. He is a former Cabinet Minister in the Government of Maharashtra as Minister for Animal Husbandry, Dairy Development and Fisheries Development in the Maha Yuti government. He is the founder and National President of Rashtriya Samaj Paksha, an Indian political party based in Maharashtra, founded in 2003.

== Early life and education ==
Mr. Jankar was born in a poor peasant and Dhangar (Gaderia) family in a small village at Palsawade Ta.Maan which is in the Satara district. Jankar completed his Degree In Electrical Engineering with first class from Walchand College of Engineering, Sangli.

== Political career ==
Mr. Jankar started his political career by joining Bahujan Samaj Party in the leadership of Kanshi Ram. Then he became the chief of Yashwant Sena. But Yashwant Sena being a cultural organization had some limits in achieving political ends. In 2003, he founded the political party Rashtriya Samaj Paksha, contested the Madha Lok Sabha seat in 2009 elections, he finished in third place behind the winner, Sharad Pawar of the Nationalist Congress Party and Subhash Deshmukh of the Bharatiya Janata Party.

He also contested a Lok Sabha seat in 2014 from Baramati where he finished in second place behind the winner, Supriya Sule of the Nationalist Congress Party by a huge margin of 69,719.

He was elected as a Member of the Legislative Council on 23 January 2015. He was promoted in July 2016 as Minister for Animal Husbandry, Dairy Development and Fisheries Department, Maharashtra State.
