= Sakshi Gulati =

Indian model and film actress (born 1988)

- Born: 10 March 1988 (age 38); Meerut, Uttar Pradesh, India
- Occupations: Actress, Model
- Height: 5 ft 8 in (1.73 m)

Sakshi Gulati is an Indian model and actress. She was the Femina Miss India 2007 runner-up. She made her acting debut in Hindi cinema with Ram Gopal Varma's 2008 film Contract. She then appeared in films such as The Film Emotional Atyachar (2010), and the Telugu film Katha Screenplay Darsakatvam Appalaraju (2011).

She finished shooting for a Hindi romantic comedy movie and a Telugu movie, Chitrangada on Sri Vighnesh Karthik Cinema banner in G. Ashok's direction.

== Early life ==
Born into a Punjabi family, Sakshi hails from an Army background. She holds Economics (hons) degree from the University of Delhi. She then underwent training in acting, Kathak and Salsa.

Sakshi is a trained swimmer, horse rider and a voracious reader.

Apart from Femina Miss India 2007, Sakshi has been a top model and has walked the ramp for Wills lifestyle Fashion Week and top fashion designers like Manav Gangwani, Neeta Lulla, Ashima Leena and Nishka Lulla. She has appeared in many print campaigns for brands like Samsung, Benetton, and Delhi Times. Sakshi has also done video ads for brands like Pond's and Diva Sarees.

== Filmography ==
Year	Film	Role	Language
2007	Delhii Heights	Sweety	Hindi
2008	Contract	Iya	Hindi
2010	The Film Emotional Atyachar	Aishwariya	Hindi
2011	Katha Screenplay Darshakatvam Appalaraju	Kanishka	Telugu
2017	Chitrangada	Samyukta	Telugu
2017	Dushman	Rhea	Punjabi
