= Swapnasundari (2026 film) =

2026 Indian Marathi-language film

- Directed by: Akshay Jaisingrao Shinde
- Written by: Akshay Jaisingrao Shinde
- Screenplay by: Akshay Jaisingrao Shinde; Tushar Gunjal
- Produced by: Satish Mahadev Gejage
- Starring: Bhushan Pradhan; Sayli Patil
- Cinematography: Shiva BK Kumar
- Edited by: Pradeep Patole
- Music by: Ankush Boradkar
- Production company: Redbell Media
- Distributed by: Panorama Studios
- Release date: 24 July 2026
- Running time: 137 minutes
- Country: India
- Language: Marathi

Swapnasundari (Marathi: स्वप्नसुंदरी, lit. 'dream beauty') is a 2026 Indian Marathi-language romantic drama film written and directed by Akshay Jaisingrao Shinde and produced by Satish Mahadev Gejage under Redbell Media. It stars Bhushan Pradhan and Sayli Patil, with Ashok Shinde, Shilpa Navalkar, Satish Mahadev Gejage and Madhavi Juvekar in supporting roles. The film follows a young man with rigid expectations of a future wife who proposes an unconventional trial arrangement before agreeing to an arranged marriage.

Swapnasundari was released theatrically across Maharashtra on 24 July 2026. It received mixed to negative reviews from critics, who praised the lead performances but faulted the screenplay and direction, and performed poorly at the box office.

== Plot ==
Raghav is a young businessman with firmly fixed notions about the kind of woman he wants to marry. Under pressure from his parents to settle into an arranged marriage, he meets a series of prospective brides, none of whom match the image he carries in his mind. He then proposes an unusual condition: that he and a prospective bride live together for a month before he commits to the match.

Mansi agrees to the arrangement and moves in for the stipulated month. She is unlike the woman Raghav imagined, and he initially remains unconvinced. After he is injured in an accident, however, her care for him during his recovery gradually changes his feelings, forcing him to weigh his own long-held ideals against the person actually in front of him.

== Cast ==
- Bhushan Pradhan as Raghav
- Sayli Patil as Mansi
- Ashok Shinde as Raghav's father
- Shilpa Navalkar as Raghav's mother
- Madhavi Juvekar as Seema, the house help
- Satish Mahadev Gejage as Harshad, Raghav's business partner

== Production ==
The film was written and directed by Akshay Jaisingrao Shinde, with additional screenplay by Tushar Gunjal. The film was formally announced at a muhurta ceremony held at the Villa Maria bungalow in the Camp area of Pune in March 2025.

== Music ==
The songs were composed by Ankush Boradkar, while the background score was composed by Aditya Bedekar.

Tracklisting
No.	Title	Lyrics	Singer(s)	Length
1.	"Fulto Jasa Mogra"	Shrirang Godbole	Abhay Jodhpurkar, Reeshika Mukherjee	4:51
2.	"Shodhu Kuthe Navri"	Prashant Madpuwar	Kunal Ganjawala	3:28
3.	"Jaadu Kelis Tu"	Shrirang Godbole	Abhijeet Sawant, Aarya Ambekar	3:47
4.	"Taare Sajle Aakashi (Female Version)"	Sachin Kadam	Aarya Ambekar	3:46
Total length:				15:52

== Release ==
In April 2026, Pradhan shared a photograph on social media showing him in a romantic pose with a woman, with rings visible and the date 24 July 2026 in the caption, leading fans and media outlets to interpret it as an announcement of his engagement and upcoming wedding. Two days later, he released the film's first-look poster, revealing that the woman was his co-star Sayli Patil and that the date referred to the film's release.

The teaser was released in June 2026 and the theatrical trailer on 7 July 2026. The film was released in theatres on 24 July 2026, distributed by Panorama Studios. Shortly after its release, the film was withdrawn from several cinemas. Bhushan Pradhan publicly voiced disappointment over the limited number of screens and showtimes allocated to the film.

== Reception ==
Anub George of The Times of India rated the film 3 out of 5, praising the leads' chemistry and Madhavi Juvekar's comic timing, writing that it offered "a nuanced take on modern arranged marriages without being preachy", while criticising the slow first half, Pradhan's performance and its reliance on songs and montages for character development. Writing for Marathi outlet LetsUpp, critic Amit Bhandari praised the film's exploration of idealised love, its light treatment of the theme, and the performances of Pradhan, Patil and the supporting cast, while noting shortcomings in its slow first half, familiar scenes and lack of psychological depth.
