= Zakir Hussain (actor) =

Indian actor

- Born: Zakir Hussain; Meerut, Uttar Pradesh, India
- Education: National School of Drama
- Occupation: Actor
- Years active: 1997–present
- Spouse: Sarita Hussain (m. 1994)

Zakir Hussain is an Indian actor who primarily appears in Hindi films. He is known for his negative and comic roles. His best-known performances include those of Rashid in Ramgopal Varma's 2005 film Sarkar, Shardul in Sriram Raghavan's 2007 film Johnny Gaddaar and Prakash Rao in Rohit Shetty's Singham Returns.

== Early life and background ==
Zakir Hussain was born and brought up in Jani Khurd, Meerut, Uttar Pradesh. It was during his studies in Delhi that he first got attracted to the world of theatre and cinema. He started out with "small time" theatre, and then joined the Shri Ram Centre for Performing Arts. He then joined the prestigious National School of Drama and graduated in 1993.

== Career ==
Hussain did theatre for a few years and then came to Mumbai to work in television and films. He started out with serials like Firdaus, Kitty Party and Gaatha, and this earned him recognition. Sriram Raghavan's 2004 film Ek Hasina Thi was his first film as actor. Hussain's role in the film was limited to two scenes, but he managed to impress director Ramgopal Varma, who then offered him the role of Rashid in Sarkar. This role of a cold-blooded villain was much appreciated and Hussain received the "New Menace" award at the 2006 Stardust Film Awards.

After Sarkar, Varma cast Hussain in almost every production of his. Hussain's second noteworthy performance was his role of Shardul in another Raghavan film – Johnny Gaddaar. This performance was so well received by audiences that people on the streets started addressing Hussain as Shardul. This was the film that brought him both decent pay cheques as well as fame.

Hussain is also a talented musician – a percussionist as well as singer. However, he is not to be confused with the famous tabla virtuoso Zakir Hussain (1951–2024), who starred in the film Heat and Dust.

== Filmography ==
Key
†	Denotes films that have not yet been released

=== Films ===
Year	Title	Role	Notes
2004	Netaji Subhas Chandra Bose: The Forgotten Hero	Shaukat Malik	
2004	Ek Hasina Thi	Sanjeev Nanda	
2004	Kala Juma	Nand Kumar Chougale	
2004	Vaastu Shastra	Dinesh Dubey	
2005	D	A. S. Baban	
2005	Sarkar	Rashid	
2005	James	Shankar Narayan	
2006	Shiva	Inspector Sawant	
2006	Darna Zaroori Hai	Police Officer	Story segment: A Bride's Revenge
2006	The Killer	Jabbar	
2006	Darwaza Bandh Rakho	Abbas	
2006	Deadline: Sirf 24 Ghante	Kabir	
2007	Black Friday	Inspector Nand Kumar Chougale	
2007	Risk	SP Naidu	
2007	Fool n Final	J.D.	
2007	Lee	Rangabashyam	Tamil film
2007	Darling	Sameer Naghani	
2007	Johnny Gaddaar	Shardul	
2008	Shabri	Inspector Irfan Qazi	
2008	Krazzy 4	DCP Shrivastav	
2008	Contract	Sultan	
2008	Phoonk	Manja	
2008	Maan Gaye Mughal-e-Azam	Show Director Dubey	
2008	Khallballi		
2009	Bad Luck Govind	Kripalani	
2009	Ajab Prem Ki Ghazab Kahani	Sajid Don	
2009	Radio	Shanaya's Dad	
2010	Banda Yeh Bindaas Hai	Javed Quadri	
2010	Payback	Raghu	
2010	Phoonk 2	Manja	
2010	Allah Ke Banday	Ramesh	
2011	Not a Love Story	Inspector	
2011	Double Dhamaal	Mohsin Bhai	
2011	Satrangee Parachute	Chhotulal	
2011	Shagird	Rajmani Yadav	
2012	Paan Singh Tomar	Inspector Rathore	
2012	Ammaa Ki Boli	Hari	
2012	Thuppakki	Kamarudeen	Tamil film
2012	Chakradhaar		
2012	Agent Vinod	Associate in Tangier	
2013	Jayantabhai Ki Luv Story	Gangster don	
2013	Enemmy	Mukhtar Menon, the Underworld don	
2013	Phata Poster Nikhla Hero	Officer Ghorpade	
2013	Sixteen	Ashwin's Father	
2013	Maazii	Mahinder Chacha	
2013	Ramaiya Vastavaiya	Rao	
2013	Saare Jahaan Se Mehnga	Loan Inspector	
2014	Holiday: A Soldier Is Never Off Duty	Alvin D'Souza	
2014	Chaarfutiya Chhokare	Lakkhan	
2014	Singham Returns	Prakash Rao	
2014	Meinu Ek Ladki Chaahiye		
2015	Alone	Professor Sanjana inside Twin Spirit	
2015	Badlapur	Patil	
2015	Four Pillars of Basement	DSP	
2015	Mogali Puvvu / Secret		
2015	Jadoogadu	Srisailam	Telugu Film
2016	Irudhi Suttru	Dev Khatri	Tamil Film
2016	Saala Khadoos	Dev Khatri	
2017	Coffee with D	D	
2017	Raees		
2017	Guru	Dev Khatri	Telugu Film
2017	Naam Shabana	RAW agent Gupta	
2017	Shivalinga	Pigeon Race Organiser	Tamil film
2017	Boyz	Fernandez Sir	Marathi film
2017	Judwaa 2	Charles	
2018	Nawabzaade	Sheetal's father	
2018	Genius	Minister	
2018	Andhadhun	Dr. Krishna Swami	
2018	Simmba	Mr. Khanna	
2018	Game Paisa Ladki		
2019	Prassthanam	Mazid	
2019	Kissebaaz	Kripa Shankar Pandey	
2019	Ferrous	Minister Madhyadheesh	
2019	One Day: Justice Delivered	MP Pravin Rawat	
2019	Chicken Curry Law	Sharad Joshi	
2019	Pagalpanti	Tulli Seth	
2020	Angrezi Medium	Judge Chedda	
2020	Khaali Peeli	Inspector Tavde	
2021	The Power	Anwar	
2021	Flight	Raman Khanna	
2021	Satyameva Jayate 2	Shankar Prasad Yadav	
2022	Heropanti 2	Azaad Khan	
2023	Mission Majnu	Sharma	
2023	Tiku Weds Sheru	Ahmed Rizvi	
2024	Indian 2	Darshan Bhai	Tamil film
2024	Devara	Central Minister	Telugu film
2024	Baby John	Baldev Patil	
2025	Bhool Chuk Maaf	Brijmohan Mishra	
2025	Dhadak 2	Principal Haider Ansari	
2025	Diesel	Rudraksha Bhatia	Tamil film
2025	The Taj Story	Adv. Anwar Rashid	
2026	Human Cocaine	Dino	
2026	Bhooth Bangla	Vashisht Sharma	
2026	Kartavya	Harihar Malik	Netflix film
2026	Welcome to the Jungle	Sinha	
TBA	Untitled film †	Filming	

=== Television ===
Year	Title	Role	Platform	Notes
1998	X Zone	Inspector	Sony TV	Episode 96
2001	Dishayen	Inspector	Doordarshan	
2012	Upnishad Ganga	Multiple Roles	Doordarshan	
2014	Yudh	Anand Upadhyay	Sony TV	
2015	Darr Sabko Lagta Hai		& TV	Episode 11
1997	Vedvyas Ke Pote	Narrator(Sutradhaar)	Doordarshan	
2018	Beechwale - Bapu Dekh Raha Hai	Bobby Beechwala	Sony TV	Main cast

=== Web series ===
Year	Title	Role	Platform	Notes
2018-2021	Chacha Vidhayak Hain Humare	Rajesh Pathak	Amazon Prime	
2019	Bombers	Somu Da	ZEE5	
2020	Sandwiched Forever	Giriraj Shastry	SonyLIV	
2021	Kathmandu Connection	Mr. Mirza	SonyLIV	
2021	Aranyak	Kuber Manhas	Netflix	
2022-2023	Duranga	Bala Banne	ZEE5	
2023	Farzi	Finance Minister Pawan Gehlot	Amazon Prime	
2022	Breathe: Into the Shadows 2	ACP Abhinandan Kaul	Amazon Prime	
2023	Pop Kaun?	Mallik	Disney+ Hotstar	
2023	Inspector Avinash	DGP Samar Pratap Singh	JioCinema	
2024	Murshid	Farid	ZEE5	
