= The Film Emotional Atyachar =

- Theatrical release poster
- Directed by: Akshay Shere
- Written by: Bhavini Bheda; Kartik Krishnan (dialogues)
- Produced by: Vijay Gutte
- Starring: Ranvir Shorey; Vinay Pathak; Ravi Kishan; Kalki Koechlin; Mohit Ahlawat
- Cinematography: Tribhuvan Babu Sadineni
- Edited by: Pranav Dhiwar
- Music by: Mangesh Dhakde; Amitabh Bhattacharya, Virag Mishra (lyrics)
- Production companies: B2 Motion Pictures; Purple Haze Motion Pictures Pvt. Ltd
- Distributed by: Red and Yellow Music
- Release date: 3 September 2010
- Running time: 90 minutes
- Country: India
- Language: Hindi

The Film Emotional Atyachar (transl. The film emotional atrocity) is a 2010 Indian Hindi-language black comedy film, directed by Akshay Shere and produced by Vijay Gutte. It stars Ranvir Shorey, Mohit Ahlawat, Kalki Koechlin and Ravi Kishan in the lead roles along with Vinay Pathak, Snehal Dabi, Abhimanyu Singh, Sakshi Gulati and Shubha Khote.

== Plot ==
Joe and Leslie, gangster Junior Bhai and his gang members, gambler Bosco and Sophie, Aishwariya and Vikram Jaiswal are all chasing a money bag. All are running live on the Mumbai-Goa highway.

== Cast ==
- Snehal Dabi... as Goti
- Ranvir Shorey... as Leslie
- Teddy Maurya... as Gun Dealer
- Vinay Pathak... as Joe
- Shobha Khote... as Joe's Mother
- Mohit Ahlawat... as Vikram Jaiswal
- Sakshi Gulati... as Aishwariya
- Kalki Koechlin... as Sophie
- Ravi Kishan... as Junior Bhai
- Abhimanyu Singh...as Bosco
- Nasser Abdullah....as Khanna
- Anand Tiwari.... as Hiten Sardesai
- Pankaj Kalra
- Rajkumar Kanojia
- Shiv Kumar Subramaniam.... as Special Appearance
- Hyaat Aasif

== Critical reception ==
Nikhat Kazmi from The Times of India rated the film 2.5 out of 5 saying, "Quirky as it comes, but not enough of crookedness to pitch it in the league of Johnny Gaddar and the likes, Emotional Atyachar is a black comedy that mostly ends up grey". Sukanya Verma from Rediff.com rated the film 1 out of 5 and said, "The only decent thing about this Atyachar is that it wraps up in about 90 minutes".

== Track list ==
No.	Title	Singer(s)	Length
1.	"Chitka Hua"	Aditi Singh Sharma	05:01
2.	"Emotional Atyachar"	Bappi Lahiri, Swaroop Khan, Toolika Das & Upasona	05:36
3.	"Emotional Atyachar (Reloaded)"	Bappi Lahiri, Swaroop Khan, Toolika Das & Upasona	05:36
4.	"Ankhon Ne"	S Runjhun	04:38
5.	"Dont Go Awar"	Kumar Sanu
6.	"Kaafir"	Ramya Iyer	06:00
7.	"Dekhun Raat Din"	Kumar Sanu, Anuradha Paudwal
8.	"Soniye"	Ramya Iyer	06:00
9.	"Sun Liya"	Samir Date
10.	"Yaadon Ki"	K.S.Chithra	05:38
11.	"Chalte Jana Hai"	Instrumental
