= Psycho (2013 film) =

- Theatrical release poster
- Directed by: Kishore Bharghava
- Written by: Ram Gopal Varma; Rohit G. Banawlikar; Ram Gopal Varma
- Produced by: Vivekananda Ahuja; Ram Gopal Varma
- Starring: Milind Gunaji; Priyanka Kothari; Raj Shroff; Nakul Vaidya; Vijay Kashyap
- Cinematography: Harshraj Shroff; M. Ravichandran; Thevar
- Music by: Pradeep Mukhopadhyay
- Distributed by: Caliber Films
- Release date: 21 June 2013
- Running time: 86 minutes
- Country: India
- Language: Telugu

Psycho is a 2013 Indian Telugu thriller film directed by Kishore Bhargava and written by Ram Gopal Varma. The film is touted to be treated with rogue filmmaking.

== Plot ==
Meera appears as a responsible middle-class girl who runs her home by doing a job. Her father is a retired employee. Brother dreams of becoming a football player like Ronaldo. Her colleague in office Shekar loves her but she does not accept it. Meera meets Nikhil in a bus. After regularly travelling in the bus both turn friends. When closeness starts developing between them, Nikhil shows his real side. After knowing Nikhil's intentions and true nature, Meera avoids him and maintains distance from him. Unable to digest this, Nikhil starts stalking Meera. He goes on harassing Meera with vulgar messages, calls and even goes to the extent of threatening and humiliating her. Unable to bear this Meera goes to a Police Station and complains. But police do not take her complaints seriously. With no sign of help coming from anyone, she approaches Shekar. How Shekar reacts to her problems, what's psycho's reaction for that, how Meera faces this situation, did she come out of this psycho attack are the issues covered in the rest of the story.

== Cast ==
- Milind Gunaji
- Priyanka Kothari as Meera
- Raj Shroff as Nikhil
- Nakul Vaidya as Shekar
- Vijay Kashyap
