= Time Bara Vait =

- Directed by: Rahul Bhatankar
- Story by: Alphonse Puthren; Rahul Bhatankar
- Produced by: Vijay Gutte
- Starring: Bhushan Pradhan; Satish Rajwade; Nidhi Oza; Hrishikesh Joshi; Vishwajeet Pradhan
- Cinematography: Rajesh Rathore
- Edited by: Rahul Bhatankar
- Music by: Rajesh Murugesan
- Production company: VRG Motion Pictures
- Release date: 19 June 2015
- Running time: 125 minutes
- Country: India
- Language: Marathi

Time Bara Vait (Marathi: टाईम बरा वाईट) is a 2015 Indian Marathi-language film directed by Rahul Bhatankar under VRG Motion Pictures banner starring Bhushan Pradhan, Satish Rajwade, Nidhi Oza, Vishwajeet Pradhan. The movie released on 19 June 2015. The film is a remake of Malayalam-Tamil Bilingual film Neram directed by Alphonse Putharen, starring Nivin Pauly, Nazriya Nazim and Bobby Simha.

== Plot ==
The story revolves around the life of Rahul (Bhushan Pradhan), a computer engineer who lost his job. As he is jobless, he is also turned down by his girlfriend - Priya's father, who he was about to marry.

At the same time he is hounded by a loan shark- Bhai Raja (Satish Rajwade) from whom he borrowed money for his sister's marriage. At the present day he has a deadline to return money to the loan shark till 5 pm. His day turns upside down when he is robbed of money he got from his best friend to repay Bhai Raja. Meanwhile, Priya decides to run away from her father and elope with Rahul. Suspecting on Rahul, Priya's father lodges a complaint against him in the nearby police station. So now Rahul is a fugitive from both, the law as well as Bhai Raja. Rahul is broke, confused and helpless and adding to his problems, he is also pressurized by his brother-in-law to give a hefty amount to start a business. Helpless and desperate Rahul wants to get out of the nightmare.

Will he be able to repay his loan and get the love of his life in the same day? Rahul has yet to experience a lot as the day is yet to be finished.

== Cast ==
- Bhushan Pradhan as Rahul
- Satish Rajwade as Bhai Raja
- Nidhi Oza as Priya
- Bhalchandra Kadam as Auto wala
- Sanjay Mone as Priya's Father
- Hrishikesh Joshi as Sr. Inspector Vittu Popat
- Vishwajeet Pradhan as Big Bhai
- Anand Ingale
- Siddhant Bodake
- Nupur Dhudwadkar
- Rajesh Bhosale

== Soundtrack ==
Time Bara Vait

Soundtrack album by Rajesh Murugesan
- Released: 19 June 2015
- Genre: Feature film soundtrack
- Length: 14:51
- Language: Marathi
- Label: Zee Music Company
External audio
- Audio Jukebox on YouTube

Rajesh Murugesan composed the soundtrack and film score of the original movie Neram. The soundtrack has been recreated for Time Bara Vait.

=== Track listing ===
No.	Title	Singer	Length
1.	"Kadal Sneham Mohabbat"	Hrishikesh Ranade	4:05
2.	"Dauda Dauda"	Ajit Parab	3:43
3.	"Pista"	Adarsh Shinde	2:27
4.	"Varyache Gungunto Gaane"	Ajit Parab	4:44
Total length:			14:59

== Critical reception ==
Mihir Bhanage of The Times of India gave the film a rating of 3 out of 5 saying that, "The pace of the film is stunningly fast and keeps you on the edge of your seats. A drawback is the flashback sequences which at times the viewer is unable to link immediately."
