= Shereveer Vakil =

Indian film actor and gym trainer

- Born: 1968 (age 57–58); India
- Occupations: Actor; Personal trainer
- Years active: 2005—present

Shereveer Vakil is an Indian actor and gym trainer. Best known for playing Lucky Xaka in the 2007 cult classic Welcome, he has also appeared in James (2005) and the Malayalam film Big B (2007). Besides this, he has worked earlier as personal trainer for many Bollywood celebrities, including Kajol, Ajay Devgn and Sanjay Dutt.

== Filmography ==
Year	Film	Role	Language
1999	Taal	Musician in Chamba	Hindi
2005	James	Radhe Narayan	Hindi
2006	Shiva	John	Hindi
2007	Go	T. S. Ranganathan	Hindi
2007	Big B	Sayippu Tony	Malayalam
2007	Welcome	Lucky Xaka	Hindi
2008	Sunday	Asim Bajaj	Hindi
2008	Golmaal Returns	Suspect Killer	Hindi
2009	Sagar Alias Jacky Reloaded	David Rosario	Malayalam
2009	All The Best	S.D	Hindi
2010	Raajneeti	Sooraj's aide	Hindi
2010	Toonpur Ka Super Hero	Director	Hindi
