= Madhusudan Manikrao Kendre =

Indian politician

Dr. Madhusudan Kendre

Member of Maharashtra Legislative Assembly
- In office 2014–2019
- Preceded by: Sitaram Ghandant (Mama)
- Succeeded by: Ratnakar Gutte
- Constituency: Gangakhed

Personal details
- Party: Nationalist Congress Party
- Education: Dr. Babasaheb Ambedkar Marathwada University
- Occupation: Politician

Dr. Madhusudan Manikrao Kendre is an Indian politician and member of the Nationalist Congress Party. He won the Gangakhed Constituency with 58415 votes in the 2014 Assembly Election, Parbhani District of Maharashtra.

On 22 March 2017, Kendre was suspended along with 18 other MLAs until 31 December for interrupting Maharashtra Finance Minister Sudhir Mungantiwar during a state budget session and burning copies of the budget outside the assembly four days earlier.

== Positions held ==
- Maharashtra Legislative Assembly MLA
- Terms in office 2014-2019
