= Business Standard =

Indian English-language daily newspaper

- Type: Daily newspaper
- Format: Broadsheet
- Owner: Business Standard Private Limited (Kotak Mahindra Bank)
- Founder: ABP Group
- Publisher: Business Standard Ltd
- Editor: Vikas Dhoot
- Staff writers: 400+(August, 2020)
- Founded: 26 March 1975; 51 years ago
- Language: English; Hindi
- Headquarters: Nehru House; 4, Bahadur Shah Zafar Marg; New Delhi 110002
- Circulation: 189,000
- OCLC number: 496280002
- Website: www.business-standard.com hindi.business-standard.com
- Free online archives: Yes

Business Standard is an Indian English-language daily edition newspaper, also available in Hindi. Founded in 1975, the newspaper covers the Indian economy, infrastructure, international business and trade, information on financial quotations, corporate governance, and a range of other financial news, opinions and insights.

The main English-language edition comes from 12 regional centres: Mumbai, New Delhi, Kolkata, Bengaluru, Coimbatore, Chennai, Ahmedabad, Hyderabad, Chandigarh, Pune, Lucknow, Bhubaneswar, and Kochi, and reaches readers in over 1,000 towns and cities across India.

== History ==
The newspaper's initial owner had been the Kolkata-based ABP Group. Circulation was rising, but losses were rising, possibly to above ₹50 crore (equivalent to ₹743 crore or US$79 million in 2026), and ABP could not support it. ABP hoped that the government would allow the Financial Times to take an equity stake in Business Standard Limited and bring in funds.

In 1997, Business Times was purchased by Kotak Mahindra Finance, in a deal led by now Kotak Mahindra Bank Managing Director and CEO Uday Kotak. Kotak said in an interview in 2005 that BS was losing ₹1.5 crore (equivalent to ₹8.3 crore or US$890,000 in 2026) a month and ABP feared being bankrupted by the losses. Aveek and Arup Sarkar spun BS off into a separate company and approached Kotak as a potential buyer, fearing they needed to close down the paper. "I did a quick calculation. I believed that if I put Rs 20 crore into the paper, we could turn it around. The cost of acquisition was virtually zero. The Sarkars were so desperate that they were ready to give the paper up for nothing. I can't remember how much we paid but it was only a crore or so. Kotak Mahindra was flush with funds – some from the Goldman Sachs JV – so it seemed like a risk worth taking," he said.

The paper remained India's second-largest business daily in terms of circulation for years, until in 2017, when its ranking sank. In January 2019, it was judged by the Indian Readership Survey (IRS) to be the fourth largest financial newspaper (with an average annual readership of 107,000 copies) and third largest selling financial newspaper (with a total readership of 505,000).

In January 2020, the paper had recovered some ground. The IRS 2019Q4 survey found the newspaper gained 45,000 readers over the final quarter of 2019 to hit an average issue readership of 189,000 copies. It is the third-highest selling financial newspaper in India, behind The Economic Times and Mint.

== Editor ==
Financial journalist T. N. Ninan was the editor from 1993 to 2009. In January 2010, Ninan became chairman and editorial director of Business Standard Ltd and was succeeded as editor of Business Standard by Dr Sanjaya Baru, who was formerly media advisor to Prime Minister Manmohan Singh. Long-term Business Standard editorial staff Ashok K Bhattacharya took charge of the paper after Baru quit to join a UK-based think tank in 2011. The current editor is Vikas Dhoot, who was preceded by Shailesh Dobhal.

== Employees ==
While exact figures are not known, more than 100 business journalists are currently employed with the publication. After the onset of the COVID-19 pandemic in India, the newspaper fired almost 100 employees, almost half of whom were editorial staff.

The offices with the largest editorial teams are in Delhi, which mostly covers government policy news and Mumbai, mostly dedicated to corporate, financial and share market news. Other offices with reporting bureaus are present in Kolkata, Bangalore, and Ahmedabad. The newspaper had few reporters in other major cities such as Chennai and Bhubaneswar, and their numbers have been continuously reduced since 2016. Reporters based out of Lucknow, Chandigarh and Hyderabad were let go.
