= The Importance Of Shinzo Abe =

2023 essay collection

The Importance of Shinzo Abe: India, Japan, and Indo-Pacific
- Editor: Sanjaya Baru
- Language: English
- Subjects: Shinzo Abe
- Genre: Collection of essays
- Publisher: Harper Collins India
- Publication date: July, 2023
- Publication place: India

The Importance of Shinzo Abe: India, Japan, and the Indo-Pacific is a collection of essays, edited by Sanjaya Baru and published by HarperCollins India in 2023. The book contains essays on the former Japanese PM Shinzo Abe and his strategic vision for Japan, India, and the Indo-Pacific. Its foreword is written by S. Jaishankar, India's Minister for External Affairs, and the essays are written by Tomohiko Taniguchi, Heizō Takenaka, Suhasini Haider, and Deepa Gopalan Wadhwa, among others.

== Reception ==
Columnist Harshil Mehta called the book “an invaluable resource” and “a must-read for scholars, policymakers, and anyone interested in the intricate interplay between leadership and geopolitics in the contemporary world” in his review for Firstpost. However, Mehta remarked that the book was somewhat specialised and many points in its essays were indistinguishable.

The Financial Express praised the book and called it a "is a fitting homage to the memory of the former Japanese prime minister." The Tribune wrote in a review that the writers of the book "provide us with an in-depth look at Abe’s contributions."
