= Priyanka Kothari =

Indian actress

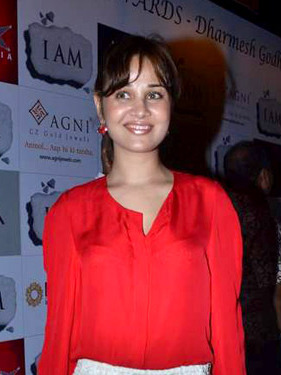
- Kothari in 2012
- Born: November 30, 1983 (age 42)
- Other names: Nisha Kothari; Amoha
- Occupations: Actress; Stage performer
- Years active: 2003–2016
- Spouse: Bhasker Prakash (m. 2016)

Priyanka Kothari, often credited as Nisha Kothari or Amoha, is an Indian former actress and model. She has appeared in Hindi, Telugu, Tamil and Kannada films.

== Early life ==
Priyanka Kothari was born in West Bengal. She moved to New Delhi while in grade 10 and got her bachelor's degree in physical science from Delhi University at Dyal Singh College, Delhi. She chose chemistry as her father is a chemical businessman, while her mother is a home-maker. She has learnt Kathak for 6 years and attended acting classes with Kishore Namit Kapoor.

== Career ==
After college, Kothari became a model and appeared in a number of advertisement campaigns. She appeared in the music video of the remix of Chadti Jawani Meri Chaal Mastani. In 2003, she got her big break through actor Madhavan, who recommended her for an audition in his film after viewing her photographs. She made her acting debut with him in the Tamil film Jay Jay, credited as Amoga. She made her Bollywood debut in the 2005 film Sarkar and then later that same year appeared in James, directed by Ram Gopal Varma and Rohit Jugraj respectively. James turned her into a sex symbol overnight. She then went on to do The Killer with Emraan Hashmi. Since then she had appeared in less significant films and roles. She was regularly seen in Ram Gopal Varma's films like Shiva, Darna Zaroori Hai, Aag, in which she played a tapori called Ghungroo, Darling and Agyaat and also his productions like Go and Stalker. Most of the films were unsuccessful. She made her Sandalwood debut with Raaj the Showman opposite Puneeth Rajkumar in 2009 and later did a supporting role in Dandupalya. She was seen in a Telugu film with Balakrishna, Okka Magadu which also bombed and also acted in a film titled Hari Om.

Her only 2011 release was Bin Bulaye Baraati. In 2013, she appeared in a Malaysian Tamil film titled, Ops Kossa Dappa 3. She was seen in the Telugu-Tamil film Ala Ila Ela, which had a delayed release in 2023, and has signed up a Telugu thriller titled Criminals.

== Other work ==
Kothari is a member of the International Film And Television Club of Asian Academy of Film & Television. She is the co-founder of Nisha Foundation.

In the 2011 West Bengal state assembly elections, she campaigned for Dr Nirmal Majhi, an All India Trinamool Congress candidate contesting from North Uluberia, Kolkata.

In 2011, she walked the ramp at Wills Lifestyle India Fashion Week (WIFW), which she describes as her comeback in Bollywood.

== Filmography ==
Year	Film	Role	Language	Notes
2003	Jay Jay	Jamuna	Tamil	Credited as Amoga
2004	Madhyanam Hathya	Nikita	Telugu	
2005	James	Nisha V. Rawat	Hindi	
2005	Sarkar	Sapna	Hindi	
2006	Shiva	Sandhya Joshi	Hindi	
2006	The Killer	Rhea	Hindi	
2006	Darna Zaroori Hai	Item dancer	Hindi	Special appearance in the song "Aa Aake Dar"
2007	Go	Vasundhara 'Vasu' Dave	Hindi	
2007	Darling	Herself	Hindi	Special appearance
2007	Aag	Ghungroo	Hindi	
2008	Okka Magadu	Alivelu	Telugu	
2009	Agyaat	Aasha	Hindi	
2009	Raaj-The Showman	Parvathy	Kannada	Nominated - Filmfare Award for Best Actress – Kannada
2009	Karthigai	Pooja	Tamil	
2010	Kacheri Arambam	Item dancer	Tamil	Special appearance in the song "Vaada Vaada"
2011	Bin Bulaye Baraati	Shreya	Hindi	
2012	Dandupalya	Susheela	Kannada	
2013	Ops Kossa Dappa 3	Priyanka	Tamil	Malaysian film Special appearance
2013	Psycho	Meera	Telugu	
2013	Yaaradre Nanagenu		Kannada	
2013	Nuvve Naa Bangaram		Telugu	
2013	Criminals		Telugu	
2016	Bullet Rani		Kannada / Telugu	
2023	Ala Ila Ela	Item dancer	Telugu	Special appearance in the song "Dakkho Dakkho"
2024	Oru Thee	Item dancer	Tamil	Special appearance in the song "Kannamoochi"

=== Music videos ===
Year	Album	Song	Singer
2002	Aur Ek Haseena Thi	''Chadti Jawani Remix''	DJ ashish
2004	DJ South Hot Mix	''Kiss U Day & Night Remix''	DJ South
2004	Maal Bhari Aahe – DJ Hot Remix	''Nako Uga Tu Maru Boba''	DJ Hot
