= James (2005 film) =

- Directed by: Rohit Jugraj
- Written by: Rohit Jugraj; Kona Venkat; Manish Gupta
- Produced by: Ram Gopal Varma; R. R. Venkat
- Starring: Mohit Ahlawat; Nisha Kothari; Zakir Hussain; Mohan Agashe; Snehal Dabi; Rajpal Yadav; Riya Sen
- Cinematography: Amal Neerad
- Edited by: Nipun Gupta; Amit Parmar
- Music by: Bapi-Tutul; Amar Mohile; Nitin Raikwar; Prasanna Shekhar
- Production company: RGV Film Company
- Distributed by: R. R. Movie Makers
- Release date: 16 September 2005
- Running time: 137 minutes
- Country: India
- Language: Hindi

James is a 2005 Indian Hindi-language action film starring Mohit Ahlawat and Nisha Kothari. It was directed by Rohit Jugraj.

== Plot ==
James, who comes to Mumbai seeking a successful life, ends up working as a bouncer at a club there and fighting gangsters. He then encounters the brother of an MP, who is always committing crimes. James has a fight in the club, which causes a huge conflict between the two; this also gets his brother and MP Shanthi Narayana involved. This conflict then causes the death of James's friend, Babloo, with whom he lives, and because of this, James is set on revenge.

== Cast ==
- Mohit Ahlawat as James
- Priyanka Kothari as Nisha V. Rawat
- Mohan Agashe as DCP Vijay Singh Rawat
- Zakir Hussain as Shanti Narayan
- Shereveer Vakil as Radhey Narayan
- Ravi Kale as Inspector Talwekar
- Snehal Dabi as Babloo
- Rajpal Yadav as Tony
- Vinayakan as Shanti Narayan's henchman
- Vineet Sharma as Shanti Narayan's henchman
- Riya Sen in item number

== Music ==
1. Jan Hain Tujhpe Jan Hain - Shreya Ghoshal, Sonu Nigam
2. Jindagee Jine Kaa Nam Hain Jee Le - Shweta Pandit
3. Sinduree Aasman Hain Sharmaya Sa - Shweta Pandit, Sonu Nigam
4. Suraj Kee Kirno Kee Lalee Me Tum Ho - Shweta Pandit, Sonu Nigam
5. Woh Hero Hain, Hero Hain Woh Hain Hero - Sunidhi Chauhan

== Critical reception ==
The Birmingham Evening Mail wrote, "The fight scenes and the songs are entertaining", but overall the film is "instantly forgettable". James was a major disappointment for its producers. Taran Adarsh of Bollywood Hungama gave the film 2/5 stars and wrote, "On the whole, JAMES is a masala film that might appeal to the hardcore masses. At the box-office, the action film may strike a chord in some territories [the Hindi belt], but its prospects at metros and multiplexes mainly appear dim."
