= Contract (2008 film) =

- Directed by: Ram Gopal Varma
- Written by: Prashant Pandey
- Produced by: Praveen Nischol; Ajay Bijli; Sanjeev K. Bijli
- Starring: Adhvik Mahajan; Prasad Purandare; Sakshi Gulati; Zakir Hussain; Amruta Subhash; Kishor Kadam; Sumeet Nijhawan; Upendra Limaye
- Cinematography: Aseem Mishra
- Edited by: Amit Parmar; Nipun Ashok Gupta
- Music by: Amar Mohile; Bappi Tutul; Sana Kotwal; Rooshin Dalal; Clinton Mascarenhas (Background score)
- Production company: PVR Pictures
- Distributed by: PVR Pictures
- Release date: 18 July 2008
- Country: India
- Language: Hindi

Contract is a 2008 Indian Hindi-language action drama film written by Prashant Pandey and directed by Ram Gopal Varma. The film is set against the backdrop of terrorism and the infiltration by R.A.W. and the Intelligence Bureau.

Starring Adhvik Mahajan, Upendra Limaye, Prasad Purandare, and Zakir Hussain in pivotal roles, the film received mixed reviews. The film was screened retrospectively at the 2010 Fribourg International Film Festival.

== Plot ==
The story revolves around an ex-Special Protection Group Commando, Amaan Malik, whose wife and daughter are killed in a terrorist attack. Indian agents, working with the RAW of India, approach Amaan for collaboration to hunt the mastermind behind the serial terrorist attacks in Mumbai, Sultan. Sultan is executing another mission of serial blasts, including a government hospital in Mumbai. Supported by the Intelligence Bureau (India), how RAW and Amaan are able to infiltrate the underworld gangs to reach Sultan forms the rest of the plot.

== Cast ==
- Adhvik Mahajan as Amaan Malik
- Sakshi Gulati as Iya
- Kishor Kadam as Dara Bajaj
- Sumeet Nijhawan as R.D.
- Amruta Khanvilkar as Divya Jalani
- Upendra Limaye as Goonga
- Amruta Subhash as Goonga's Wife
- Ranjeev Verma as karim ali
- Vibha Cheebur as Commissioner
- Prasad Purandare as Ahmad Hussain
- Jaspaul Sandhu as Home Minister
- Raaj Gopal as RAW Shridhar
- Vikas Shrivastav as RAW Lalji
- Zakir Hussain as Sultan Jabbar Khan
- Brajesh Jha as Zahwari
- Yasir Khan as Allwyn
- Jai Tari as Bhansal

== Soundtrack ==
- "Maula Khair Kare" – Shilpa Rao, Sukhwinder Singh
- "The Heart Of Contract" – Instrumental
- "Jeene Ka" – Runa Rizvi, Ravi Shankar
- "Badalon Pe" – Shaan
- "Saathiya" – Adnan Sami, Tulsi Kumar
- "Har Kafan" – Abhishek Nailwal, Runa Rizvi
- "Twinkle Twinkle" – Amitrajit Bhattacharee, Devika Verma, Rajana Verma, Trishe
- "Khallas" – Asha Bhosle, Sudesh Bhosle, Sapna Awasthi
- "Hai Aag Yeh" – Sunidhi Chauhan
- "Take Lite" – Jiah Khan
