= Shiva (2006 film) =

2006 film by Ram Gopal Varma

- Directed by: Ram Gopal Varma
- Written by: Sajid-Farhad
- Produced by: Ram Gopal Varma
- Starring: Mohit Ahlawat; Nisha Kothari; Dilip Prabhawalkar; Upendra Limaye; Nagesh Bhonsle; Suchitra Pillai; Shereveer Vakil
- Cinematography: Amal Neerad
- Edited by: Rameshwar S. Bhagat
- Music by: Ilaiyaraaja
- Production company: RGV Film Company
- Release date: 15 September 2006
- Running time: 119 minutes
- Country: India
- Language: Hindi
- Budget: 6 crore
- Box office: 3.43 crore

Shiva is a 2006 Indian Hindi-language action film produced and directed by Ram Gopal Varma. The film was a prequel to the original 1990, Shiva, which is a remake of the 1989 Telugu film of the same name. The film was screened at the New York Asian Film Festival. The film was dubbed in Telugu as Shiva 2006.

== Plot ==
The film begins with the brutal murder of a Mumbai man named John by a group of gangsters led by ruthless kingpin Bappu Ganesh. As time goes on, Bappu becomes more and more powerful, until he manages to seize power from the government of Maharashtra and make himself chief minister of the state to seize all of Maharashtra's money. Shiva Swarassi is a poor slum-dweller who, after watching his parents being brutally murdered by Bappu's men, decides that it's time to get rid of Bappu. He gets the people of Dharavi Slum in Mumbai together and forms a rebellion against him.

== Cast ==
- Mohit Ahlawat as SI Shiva Kumar
- Nisha Kothari as Sandhya Joshi
- Upendra Limaye as Bappu Ganesh
- Shereveer Vakil as John
- Ninad Kamat as Bollywood
- Dilip Prabhawalkar as Home Minister Manohar Shirke
- Nagesh Bhonsle as Inspector Sudhir Kamat
- Zakir Hussain as Inspector Sawant
- Raju Mavani as Inspector Tavde
- Pankaj Jha as Inspector Salim Inamdar
- Ranvir Shorey as Daksh Kumar
- Suchitra Pillai as Manasi
- Dinesh Lamba as Hawaldar Atmaran Bhende
- Sanjeev Wilson as Inspector Sarvar Sheikh
- Ganesh Mayekar as Chutney
- Raam as Mukadam
- Vinod Jayawant as Bharti

== Music ==
Shiva

Soundtrack album by Ilaiyaraaja
- Released: 4 August 2006
- Genre: Feature film soundtrack
- Label: T-Series

The music was composed by Ilaiyaraaja. The song "Saara Yeh Aalam" is based on "Ananda Ragam" from the Tamil film Panneer Pushpangal (1981).

=== Hindi Soundtrack ===
No	Song	Singer(s)	Lyricist(s)
1	"Dheemi Dheemi"	Shreya Ghoshal	Gulzar
2	"Josh Mein"	K. J. Yesudas	Gulzar
3	"Kaise Kahein"	Sadhana Sargam, Roopkumar Rathod	Gulzar
4	"Police Police"	Shweta Pandit, Ninad Kamat	Gulzar
5	"Saara Yeh Alam Noorani Hai"	Shreya Ghoshal, Roopkumar Rathod	Gulzar
6	"Shapath"	Ilaiyaraaja	Gulzar

=== Telugu Soundtrack ===
No	Song	Singer(s)	Lyricist(s)
1	"Manasa Adagava"	Shreya Ghoshal	Sirivennela Seetharama Sastry
2	"Pourusham Swasaga"	Vijay Prakash	Sirivennela Seetharama Sastry
3	"Adaganidhe Cheppedhi"	Sunitha, Vijay Prakash	Sirivennela Seetharama Sastry
4	"Police Police"	Shweta Pandit, Ninad Kamat	Sirivennela Seetharama Sastry
5	"Ye Oohalonu"	Vijay Prakash, Shreya Ghoshal	Sirivennela Seetharama Sastry
6	"Enno Tyagala"	Ilaiyaraaja	Sirivennela Seetharama Sastry

=== Tamil Soundtrack ===
No	Song	Singer(s)	Lyricist(s)
1	"Oru Naal Maalaiyil"	Shreya Ghoshal	Palani Bharathi
2	"Yezhunthu Vaa"	Vijay Prakash	Muthulingam
3	"Solvatharku Oru Solillaiya"	Tippu, Manjari	Palani Bharathi
4	"Laettaga Varuvanga Loottiyum"	Tippu, Manjari	Muthulingam
5	"En Nenjil Raagam Enge Enge"	Shreya Ghoshal, Vijay Prakash	Mu. Metha
6	"Enge Naam Desam Poguthu"	Ilaiyaraaja	Mu. Metha

== Reception ==
Sukanya Verma of Rediff.com rated the film one out of five, writing, "In the original, Raghuvaran exuded menacing energy with his smouldering eyes. In this Shiva, nasty is defined as a scowling ogre. That explains a series of repugnant performances from the bunch of incompetent villains. They evoke sniggers instead of awe." Taran Adarsh of IndiaFM gave the film one out of five, writing, "On the whole, SHIVA is a poor show, with nothing except gruesome violence on display." Jaspreet Pandohar of BBC.com wrote, " Everything from the dull good versus evil storyline, to the terrible casting of lead actors reeks of a bad decision. But the biggest culprit is the film's theme. An honest cop fighting unscrupulous elements holds little novelty today, even if an accomplished storyteller like Varma directs it. Compared with his previous works, Shiva comes across as a pale photocopy."
