= Mohit Ahlawat (actor) =

Indian actor

- Occupation: Actor
- Years active: 2005–2015

Mohit Ahlawat is an Indian actor known for his roles in Shagird (2011), Shiva (2006) and James (2005).

== Personal life ==
Ahlawat was born in the city of Panipat in Haryana state. His father exports furniture and has factories both in India and China.

He married model Sai Purandare Johar in 2005. They have a daughter together, and separated in 2011.

== Filmography ==
Film Name	Year	Language	Role(s)
James	2005	Hindi	James
Shiva	2006	Hindi	Shiva
Darna Zaroori Hai	2006	Hindi	
The Film Emotional Atyachar	2010	Hindi	Vikram Jaiswal
Shagird	2011	Hindi	Mohit
Ek Paheli Leela	2015	Hindi	Prince Ranvir Singh
