= Gangakhed Assembly constituency =

Constituency of the Maharashtra legislative assembly in India

Coordinates: 18.97°N 76.75°E

Gangakhed
- Constituency No. 97 for the Maharashtra Legislative Assembly

Constituency details
- Country: India
- Region: Western India
- State: Maharashtra
- District: Parbhani
- Lok Sabha constituency: Parbhani
- Established: 1952
- Total electors: 422,046
- Reservation: None

Member of Legislative Assembly
- 15th Maharashtra Legislative Assembly
- Incumbent Ratnakar Gutte
- Party: RSPS
- Alliance: NDA
- Elected year: 2024

Gangakhed Assembly constituency is one of 288 assembly constituencies of Maharashtra state of India. It comes under Parbhani Lok Sabha constituency for Indian general elections.

== Geographical scope ==
This constituency includes Gangakhed, Purna and Palam tehsils.

== Members of the Legislative Assembly ==
| Election | Member | Party |
|---|---|---|
| 1952 | Rang Rao | Peasants and Workers Party of India |
| 1957 | Sakharam S/o Gopalrao | Indian National Congress |
| 1957 | Pagare Namdeo S/o Deoji | Indian National Congress |
| 1962 | Devrao Mandeo | Indian National Congress |
| 1967 | Nameorao Marotrao | Indian National Congress |
| 1972 | Sawant Iraimbakrao Maretirao | Indian National Congress |
| 1978 | Gaikwad Dnyanoba Hari | Peasants and Workers Party of India |
| 1980 | Gaikwad Dnyanoba Hari | Peasants and Workers Party of India |
| 1985 | Gaikwad Dnyanoba Hari | Peasants and Workers Party of India |
| 1990 | Gaikwad Dnyanoba Hari | Peasants and Workers Party of India |
| 1995 | Sitaram Ghandant (Mama) | Independent politician |
| 1999 | Sitaram Ghandant (Mama) | Independent politician |
| 2004 | Vitthal Gaikwad | Bharatiya Janata Party |
| 2009 | Sitaram Ghandant (Mama) | Independent politician |
| 2014 | Dr. Madhusudan Kendre | Nationalist Congress Party |
| 2019 | Ratnakar Manikrao Gutte | Rashtriya Samaj Paksha |
| 2024 | Ratnakar Manikrao Gutte | Rashtriya Samaj Paksha |

== Election results ==
=== Assembly Election 2024 ===
2024 Maharashtra Legislative Assembly election : Gangakhed
| Party | Candidate | Votes | % | ±% |
|---|---|---|---|---|
| RSPS | Dr. Ratnakar Manikrao Gutte | 141,544 | 45.68 | ▲15.43 |
| SS(UBT) | Kadam Vishal Vijaykumar | 115,252 | 37.20 | New |
| VBA | Sitaram Ghandat (Mama) | 43,026 | 13.89 | ▲3.14 |
| MNS | Deshmukh Rupesh Manoharrao | 2,479 | 0.80 | ▼0.72 |
| JLP | Vitthal Jivnaji Rabdade | 2,463 | 0.79 | New |
| NOTA | None of the above | 1,470 | 0.47 | ▼0.13 |
| Margin of victory | | 26,292 | 8.49 | ▲1.76 |
| Turnout | | 311,315 | 73.76 | ▲4.40 |
| Total valid votes | | 309,845 | | |
| Registered electors | | 422,046 | | ▲8.38 |
| RSPS hold | | Swing | ▲15.43 | |

=== Assembly Election 2019 ===
2019 Maharashtra Legislative Assembly election : Gangakhed
| Party | Candidate | Votes | % | ±% |
|---|---|---|---|---|
| RSPS | Dr. Ratnakar Manikrao Gutte | 81,169 | 30.25 | ▲8.05 |
| SS | Kadam Vishal Vijaykumar | 63,111 | 23.52 | ▲6.94 |
| Independent | Sitaram Ghandat (Mam) | 52,247 | 19.47 | New |
| VBA | Karunabai Balasaheb Kundgir | 28,837 | 10.75 | New |
| Independent | Santosh Trimbak Murkute | 22,955 | 8.56 | New |
| NCP | Dr. Madhusudan Manikrao Kendre | 8,204 | 3.06 | ▼20.04 |
| MNS | Viththal Kondiba Jawade | 4,079 | 1.52 | ▼5.53 |
| Independent | Adv. Sanjiv Devrao Pradhan | 1,732 | 0.65 | New |
| NOTA | None of the above | 1,601 | 0.60 | ▼0.20 |
| Margin of victory | | 18,058 | 6.73 | ▲5.82 |
| Turnout | | 270,113 | 69.36 | ▼0.51 |
| Total valid votes | | 268,317 | | |
| Registered electors | | 389,421 | | ▲6.66 |
| RSPS gain from NCP | | Swing | ▲7.15 | |

=== Assembly Election 2014 ===
2014 Maharashtra Legislative Assembly election : Gangakhed
| Party | Candidate | Votes | % | ±% |
|---|---|---|---|---|
| NCP | Dr. Madhusudan Manikrao Kendre | 58,415 | 23.10 | ▲0.69 |
| RSPS | Dr. Ratnakar Manikrao Gutte | 56,126 | 22.20 | New |
| Independent | Sitaram Ghandant (Mama) | 47,714 | 18.87 | New |
| SS | Dr. Dalnar Shivaji Vitthalrao | 41,915 | 16.58 | New |
| MNS | Balasaheb Ramrao Desai | 17,816 | 7.05 | New |
| Independent | Srikant Digambar Bhosale | 6,119 | 2.42 | New |
| INC | Choudhari Ravikant (Balakaka) | 5,658 | 2.24 | New |
| BSP | Paithane Shivraj Prabhakar | 3,935 | 1.56 | ▼1.27 |
| NOTA | None of the above | 2,024 | 0.80 | New |
| Margin of victory | | 2,289 | 0.91 | ▼7.78 |
| Turnout | | 255,123 | 69.87 | ▲0.16 |
| Total valid votes | | 252,861 | | |
| Registered electors | | 365,115 | | ▲17.11 |
| NCP gain from Independent | | Swing | ▼13.90 | |

=== Assembly Election 2009 ===
2009 Maharashtra Legislative Assembly election : Gangakhed
| Party | Candidate | Votes | % | ±% |
|---|---|---|---|---|
| Independent | Sitaram Ghandat (Mama) | 80,404 | 37.00 | New |
| BJP | Dr. Madhusudan Manikrao Kendre | 61,524 | 28.31 | ▼5.90 |
| NCP | Suresh Ambadasrao Warpudkar | 48,703 | 22.41 | ▲20.77 |
| BSP | Devrao Ganpatrao Khandare | 6,145 | 2.83 | ▼2.72 |
| PWPI | Laxmanrao Madhavrao Golegaonkar | 5,972 | 2.75 | ▼20.60 |
| JSS | Vidyavati Ramchandra Pole | 3,370 | 1.55 | New |
| Independent | Mo. Sarvar S. Ismail | 2,358 | 1.09 | New |
| Independent | Jondhale Balasaheb Vithalrao | 1,530 | 0.70 | New |
| Margin of victory | | 18,880 | 8.69 | ▲1.30 |
| Turnout | | 217,334 | 69.71 | ▲3.58 |
| Total valid votes | | 217,326 | | |
| Registered electors | | 311,762 | | ▲63.77 |
| Independent gain from BJP | | Swing | ▲2.79 | |

=== Assembly Election 2004 ===
2004 Maharashtra Legislative Assembly election : Gangakhed
| Party | Candidate | Votes | % | ±% |
|---|---|---|---|---|
| BJP | Gaikwad Vitthal Purbhaji | 43,065 | 34.21 | ▲15.21 |
| Independent | Sitaram Ghandant (Mama) | 33,764 | 26.82 | New |
| PWPI | Vhawale Dnyanoba Mahadu | 29,395 | 23.35 | ▼5.73 |
| BSP | Jangle Vilas Manikrao | 6,992 | 5.55 | New |
| Independent | Gaikwad Dnyanoba Hari | 5,212 | 4.14 | New |
| NCP | Javade Vitthal Kondiba | 2,064 | 1.64 | New |
| Independent | Hanvate Gautam Marotrao | 1,252 | 0.99 | New |
| Independent | Thitte Govind Nagorao | 1,195 | 0.95 | New |
| Margin of victory | | 9,301 | 7.39 | ▲0.21 |
| Turnout | | 125,892 | 66.13 | ▼0.88 |
| Total valid votes | | 125,886 | | |
| Registered electors | | 190,361 | | ▲17.38 |
| BJP gain from Independent | | Swing | ▼2.04 | |

=== Assembly Election 1999 ===
1999 Maharashtra Legislative Assembly election : Gangakhed
| Party | Candidate | Votes | % | ±% |
|---|---|---|---|---|
| Independent | Sitaram Ghandant (Mama) | 34,332 | 36.25 | New |
| PWPI | Gaikwad Dnyanoba Hari | 27,536 | 29.08 | New |
| BJP | Gaikwad Vitthal Purbhaji | 17,990 | 19.00 | ▲5.42 |
| RPI | Gautam Pandurangrao Bhalerao | 9,509 | 10.04 | New |
| BBM | Jangle Vilas Manikrao | 2,226 | 2.35 | New |
| Independent | Sabne Shankar Munjaji | 1,093 | 1.15 | New |
| Independent | Gaikwad Dnyanoba Ramsen | 609 | 0.64 | New |
| Margin of victory | | 6,796 | 7.18 | ▲6.74 |
| Turnout | | 108,667 | 67.01 | ▼6.96 |
| Total valid votes | | 94,696 | | |
| Registered electors | | 162,171 | | ▲8.40 |
| Independent hold | | Swing | ▲8.84 | |

=== Assembly Election 1995 ===
1995 Maharashtra Legislative Assembly election : Gangakhed
| Party | Candidate | Votes | % | ±% |
|---|---|---|---|---|
| Independent | Sitaram Ghandant (Mama) | 29,610 | 27.41 | New |
| PWPI | Gaikwad Dnyanoba Hari | 29,134 | 26.97 | ▼23.39 |
| BJP | Salve Shivaji Gunajirao | 14,666 | 13.58 | ▼20.65 |
| Independent | Kamble Manik Rambhau | 5,466 | 5.06 | New |
| INC | Kamble Dwarkabai Baburao | 5,168 | 4.78 | New |
| Independent | Sawant Trimbak Maruti | 5,163 | 4.78 | New |
| Independent | Gadekar Shantabai Shankarrao | 3,832 | 3.55 | New |
| BBM | Bhalerao Yeshwant Santramji | 3,484 | 3.23 | New |
| Margin of victory | | 476 | 0.44 | ▼15.68 |
| Turnout | | 110,671 | 73.97 | ▲19.82 |
| Total valid votes | | 108,028 | | |
| Registered electors | | 149,610 | | ▼0.19 |
| Independent gain from PWPI | | Swing | ▼22.95 | |

=== Assembly Election 1990 ===
1990 Maharashtra Legislative Assembly election : Gangakhed
| Party | Candidate | Votes | % | ±% |
|---|---|---|---|---|
| PWPI | Gaikwad Dnyanoba Hari | 40,033 | 50.36 | ▼11.61 |
| BJP | Sitaram Ghandant (Mama) | 27,216 | 34.23 | New |
| Independent | Tompe Ambadas Narayanrao | 2,980 | 3.75 | New |
| Independent | Salve Wamanrao Purbhaji | 2,510 | 3.16 | New |
| Independent | Shegaokar Pritamkumar Sampatrao | 2,167 | 2.73 | New |
| Independent | Ganacharya Umakant Malkarjun | 1,917 | 2.41 | New |
| Independent | Gaikwad Vitthal Purbhaji | 1,058 | 1.33 | New |
| Independent | Waghmare Haribhau Narayanrao | 719 | 0.90 | New |
| Margin of victory | | 12,817 | 16.12 | ▼14.80 |
| Turnout | | 81,173 | 54.15 | ▼1.44 |
| Total valid votes | | 79,500 | | |
| Registered electors | | 149,891 | | ▲28.25 |
| PWPI hold | | Swing | ▼11.61 | |

=== Assembly Election 1985 ===
1985 Maharashtra Legislative Assembly election : Gangakhed
| Party | Candidate | Votes | % | ±% |
|---|---|---|---|---|
| PWPI | Gaikwad Dnyanoba Hari | 39,287 | 61.97 | ▲24.22 |
| INC | Sawant Iraimbakrao Maretirao | 19,685 | 31.05 | New |
| Independent | Dake Tulsiram Gyenbaro | 1,561 | 2.46 | New |
| Independent | Gundile Ramrao Sambhaji | 836 | 1.32 | New |
| RPI | Vhavle Vaijanath Kacharuba | 804 | 1.27 | ▼1.07 |
| Independent | Ganachary Vishvanath Ramling | 783 | 1.24 | New |
| Independent | Waghmare Haribhau Narayanrao | 436 | 0.69 | New |
| Margin of victory | | 19,602 | 30.92 | ▲24.36 |
| Turnout | | 64,974 | 55.59 | ▲11.87 |
| Total valid votes | | 63,392 | | |
| Registered electors | | 116,876 | | ▲7.99 |
| PWPI hold | | Swing | ▲24.22 | |

=== Assembly Election 1980 ===
1980 Maharashtra Legislative Assembly election : Gangakhed
| Party | Candidate | Votes | % | ±% |
|---|---|---|---|---|
| PWPI | Gaikwad Dnyanoba Hari | 17,398 | 37.75 | ▼0.24 |
| INC(I) | Jangle Vilas Manikrao | 14,375 | 31.19 | ▲15.60 |
| INC(U) | Nandapurkar Satwaji Sadbaji | 13,238 | 28.72 | New |
| RPI | Bhalerao Pandurang Gangaram | 1,077 | 2.34 | ▼28.27 |
| Margin of victory | | 3,023 | 6.56 | ▼0.83 |
| Turnout | | 47,318 | 43.72 | ▼2.17 |
| Total valid votes | | 46,088 | | |
| Registered electors | | 108,227 | | ▲7.47 |
| PWPI hold | | Swing | ▼0.24 | |

=== Assembly Election 1978 ===
1978 Maharashtra Legislative Assembly election : Gangakhed
| Party | Candidate | Votes | % | ±% |
|---|---|---|---|---|
| PWPI | Gaikwad Dnyanoba Hari | 16,961 | 37.99 | New |
| RPI | Nandapurkar Satwaji Sadbaji | 13,663 | 30.61 | ▼4.01 |
| INC(I) | Sawant Trimbakrao Maroti | 6,960 | 15.59 | New |
| RPI(K) | Dake Tulsiram Gyenbaro | 3,016 | 6.76 | ▼0.49 |
| Independent | Ghobale Limbaji Tulsiram | 1,774 | 3.97 | New |
| Independent | Salve Wamanrao Purbhaji | 891 | 2.00 | New |
| Independent | Jondhale Shankar Kisan | 485 | 1.09 | New |
| Independent | Waghmare Haribhau Narayanrao | 391 | 0.88 | New |
| Margin of victory | | 3,298 | 7.39 | ▼13.83 |
| Turnout | | 46,212 | 45.89 | ▲17.83 |
| Total valid votes | | 44,641 | | |
| Registered electors | | 100,702 | | ▼9.64 |
| PWPI gain from INC | | Swing | ▼17.85 | |

=== Assembly Election 1972 ===
1972 Maharashtra Legislative Assembly election : Gangakhed
| Party | Candidate | Votes | % | ±% |
|---|---|---|---|---|
| INC | Sawant Iraimbakrao Maretirao | 16,750 | 55.84 | ▼10.06 |
| RPI | More Daulat Nimbaji | 10,384 | 34.62 | ▲5.64 |
| RPI(K) | Dharba Bhimrao Lokhande | 2,176 | 7.25 | New |
| INC(O) | Katke Tulsira Chandrakant | 686 | 2.29 | New |
| Margin of victory | | 6,366 | 21.22 | ▼15.70 |
| Turnout | | 31,274 | 28.06 | ▲3.77 |
| Total valid votes | | 29,996 | | |
| Registered electors | | 111,440 | | ▲14.42 |
| INC hold | | Swing | ▼10.06 | |

=== Assembly Election 1967 ===
1967 Maharashtra Legislative Assembly election : Gangakhed
| Party | Candidate | Votes | % | ±% |
|---|---|---|---|---|
| INC | Nameorao Marotrao | 14,806 | 65.90 | ▲5.26 |
| RPI | D. L. More | 6,511 | 28.98 | New |
| Independent | T. M. Sawant | 1,149 | 5.11 | New |
| Margin of victory | | 8,295 | 36.92 | ▲11.27 |
| Turnout | | 23,653 | 24.29 | ▼10.56 |
| Total valid votes | | 22,466 | | |
| Registered electors | | 97,393 | | ▲42.33 |
| INC hold | | Swing | ▲5.26 | |

=== Assembly Election 1962 ===
1962 Maharashtra Legislative Assembly election : Gangakhed
| Party | Candidate | Votes | % | ±% |
|---|---|---|---|---|
| INC | Devrao Mandeo | 13,637 | 60.64 | ▼4.98 |
| RPI | Trimbak Marothi | 7,868 | 34.99 | New |
| Independent | Munjaji Mariba | 982 | 4.37 | New |
| Margin of victory | | 5,769 | 25.65 | ▲10.48 |
| Turnout | | 23,848 | 34.85 | ▼13.12 |
| Total valid votes | | 22,487 | | |
| Registered electors | | 68,426 | | ▼47.37 |
| INC hold | | Swing | ▲26.75 | |

=== Assembly Election 1957 ===
1957 Bombay State Legislative Assembly election : Gangakhed
| Party | Candidate | Votes | % | ±% |
|---|---|---|---|---|
| INC | Sakharam S/o Gopalrao | 21,141 | 33.89 | ▼8.56 |
| INC | Pagare Namdeo S/o Deoji | 19,791 | 31.73 | ▼10.72 |
| CPI | Vasudeo Raghunath | 11,680 | 18.72 | New |
| SCF | Madhavrao Devba | 9,765 | 15.65 | New |
| Margin of victory | | 9,461 | 15.17 | ▲9.01 |
| Turnout | | 62,377 | 47.97 | ▲22.01 |
| Total valid votes | | 62,377 | | |
| Registered electors | | 130,023 | | ▲160.03 |
| INC gain from PWPI | | Swing | ▼14.72 | |

=== Assembly Election 1952 ===
1952 Hyderabad State Legislative Assembly election : Gangakhed
| Party | Candidate | Votes | % | ±% |
|---|---|---|---|---|
| PWPI | Rang Rao | 6,309 | 48.61 | New |
| INC | Manohar Rao | 5,510 | 42.45 | New |
| Socialist | Niranjan Prashad | 1,160 | 8.94 | New |
| Margin of victory | | 799 | 6.16 | |
| Turnout | | 12,979 | 25.96 | |
| Total valid votes | | 12,979 | | |
| Registered electors | | 50,003 | | |
| PWPI win (new seat) | | | | |
