= Ratnakar Gutte =

Indian politician and businessman

Dr. Ratnakar Gutte
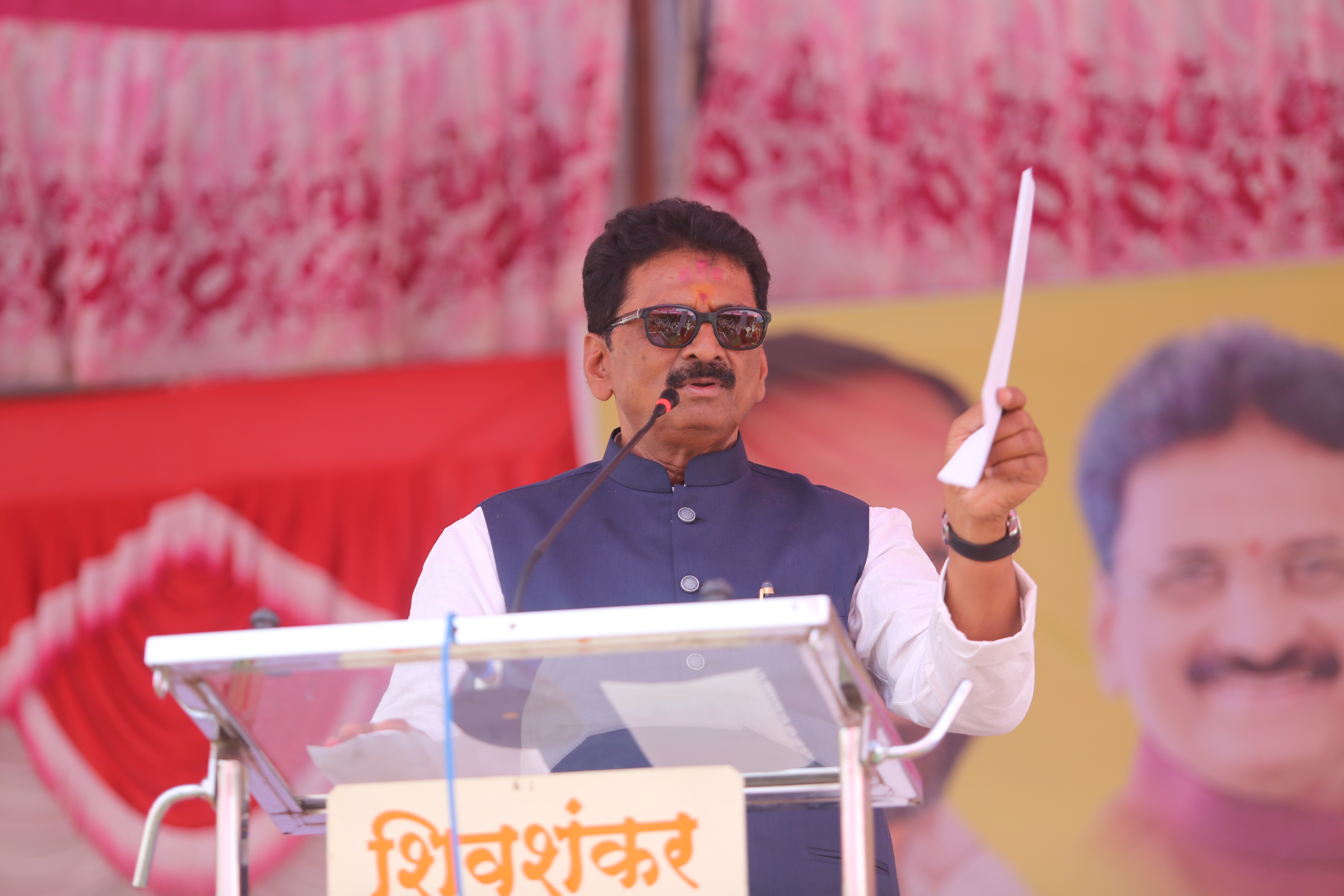
- Dr. Ratnakar Gutte

Member of Maharashtra Legislative Assembly
- Incumbent
- Assumed office October 2019
- Preceded by: Madhusudan Kendre
- Constituency: Gangakhed

Personal details
- Born: 12 August 1958 (age 67)
- Party: Rashtriya Samaj Paksha
- Spouse: Sudhamati Gutte
- Children: Sunil Gutte (son); Vijay Gutte (son); Swati Gutte (daughter)
- Parents: Manikrao Gutte (father); Dagdubai (mother)
- Profession: Industrialist

Dr. Ratnakar Manikrao Gutte is an Indian politician and a member (MLA) of Maharashtra Legislative Assembly. Ratnakar Gutte was born in a middle class family in small village of Beed district. He represents the Gangakhed assembly constituency in Parbhani district since 2019. A string of companies owned by him has been accused of fraud and the Enforcement Directorate (ED) attached his properties worth Rs. 255 crores.

== About ==
Ratnakar Gutte is on his political journey with the determination of Palam and Poorna talukas should be developed along with Gangakhed. He has always cultivated political and social commitment. Ratnakar Gutte is known as Mahameru of development.

== Personal life ==
Ratnakar Gutte is married to Sudhamati Gutte. She is a director in Sunil Hitech Engineers Limited. The couple has 1 daughter and 2 sons: Sunil Gutte and Vijay Gutte.

Ratnakar Gutte passed 8th class from Saraswati School in Parli Vaijnath, Beed district in 1973.

== Politics ==
Ratnakar Manikrao Gutte had contested the Gangakhed Assembly constituency in 2014, but lost by 2,289 votes to Madhusudan Kendre. He again contested in 2019 and won. As per his election affidavit of 2019, Gutte has ₹149.24 crore of assets with ₹32.75 crores of liability.

== Business ==
Ratnakar Gutte owns the Sunil Hitech Engineers Limited (SHEL), established on 29 May 1998. It is named after his son Sunil Ratnakar Gutte. SHEL is a construction company in power and infrastructure development sector.
