= Bhushan Pradhan =

Indian actor

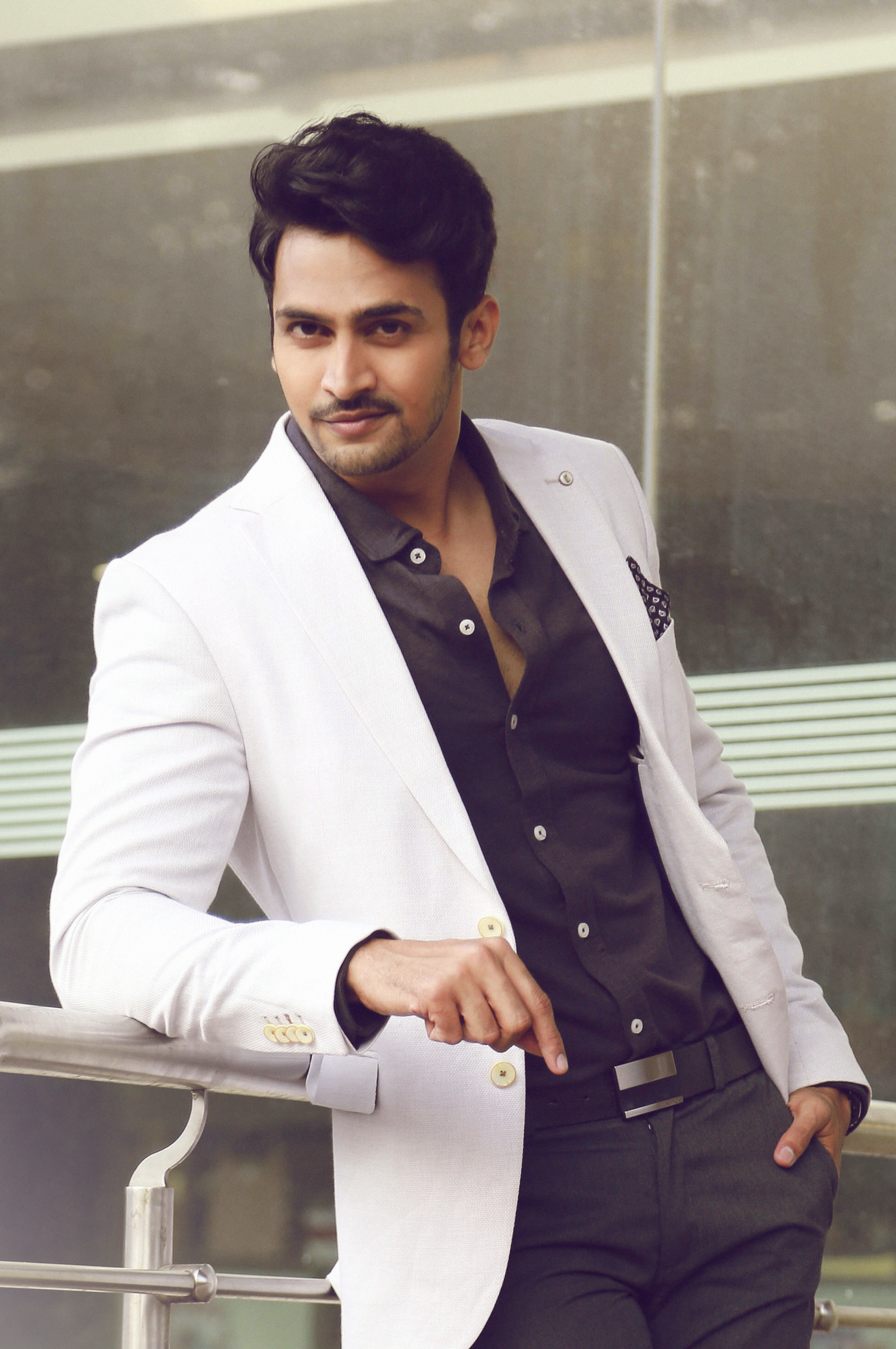
- Bhushan Pradhan
- Born: 25 November 1986 (age 39); Maharashtra, India
- Occupations: Actor; Model
- Years active: 2007 – Present
- Known for: Gharat Ganpati; Juna Furniture

Bhushan Pradhan is an Indian actor known for his work in Marathi films, web series, and theater. His roles include appearances in Juna Furniture as an IAS officer and Gharat Ganpati, Aamhi Doghi, Coffee Ani Barach Kahi, Satarangi Re, Timepass, Time Bara Vait.

He also appeared as Damodar Hari Chapekar in the ZEE5 Originals web series Gondya Aala Re.

== Media image ==
Most Desirable Men of Maharashtra
Sponsor	Year	Rank	
Sponsor	Year	Film	Ref.
The Times of India, Maharashtra Times	2017	4	
The Times of India, Maharashtra Times	2018	11	
The Times of India, Maharashtra Times	2019	1	
The Times of India, Maharashtra Times	2020	4	

He was ranked twenty-fourth in The Times of India's Top 50 Most Desirable Men of India in 2019.

== Filmography ==
=== Theater / Plays ===
Year	Title	Role	Director	Producer	Ref.
2018-2020	Hamlet	Laertes	Chandrakant Kulkarni	Zee Marathi	

=== Web series ===
Year	Title	Role	Language	OTT Platform	Ref.
2019	Gondya Aala Re	Damodar Chapekar	Marathi	ZEE5	
2019	Codename	Damodar Chapekar	Hindi	ZEE5	

=== Films ===
Year	Title	Role	Ref.
2011	Parambi	Gangadhar	
2012	Satrangi Re	Jaydeep Kamat	
2013	Kalakar	Avinash Jadhav	
2013	Mee Aani U	Abhishek	
2014	Goshta Tichya Premachi	Suhas Patil	
2014	Timepass	Vallabh Lele	
2014	Miss Match	Raj	
2015	Timepass 2	Vallabh Lele	
2015	Coffee Ani Barach Kahi	Anish	
2015	Time Bara Vait	Rahul	
2015	Dhinchak Enterprise	Vishal	
2016	1234		
2016	Nivdung	Keshav / Deva	
2016	Gulmohor	Suhas	
2017	Shivya	Raghav	
2017	Ti Ani Itar	Bhaskar	
2018	Aamhi Doghi	Raam	
2018	Re Raya	Aadesh	
2018	Tu Tithe Asave	Malhar	
2019	Shimmgga	Anna and Jay	
2021	Ajinkya	Ajinkya	
2022	Anya	Deepak	
2024	LagnaKallol	Atharva	
2024	Unn Sawali	Pranay	
2024	Juna Furniture	Abhay Govind Pathak	
2024	Gharat Ganpati	Ketan Gharat	
2025	Gaav Bolavato	Sangram	
2026	Tavvai	Pramendra	
2026	Swapnasundari	Raghav	
2026	Sammarth	Sammarth	

=== Television ===
Year	Title	Role	Channel
2007	Ghe Bharari	Raj	Mi Marathi
2009-2011	Chaar Choughi	Akshay Sarnaik	Star Pravah
2009-2010	Kunku	Aryan Sartape	Zee Marathi
2010-2011	Olakh	Jay	Star Pravah
2011-2012	Pinjara	Virendra Deshmukh (Veer)	Zee Marathi
2021	Jai Bhawani Jai Shivaji	Chattrapati Shivaji Maharaj	Star Pravah
