= Pulok Chatterji =

Indian civil servant

13th Principal Secretary to the Prime Minister of India
- In office 3 October 2011 – 26 May 2014
- Prime Minister: Manmohan Singh
- Preceded by: T. K. A. Nair
- Succeeded by: Nripendra Misra

Personal details
- Born: 1948 (age 77–78) Uttar Pradesh, India

Pulok Chatterji (born 1948) is an Indian civil servant who served as Principal Secretary to the Prime Minister of India, Manmohan Singh, from 2011 to 2014. He formerly served as Executive Director to the World Bank and Joint Secretary at the Prime Minister's Office from 2004 to 2009.

He is a 1974 batch Indian Administrative Service officer from Uttar Pradesh cadre.

== Early life and education ==
His late father had been Chairman of United Commercial Bank. He is an alumnus of St. Stephen's College, Delhi.

== Career ==
On 27 June 1980, he was made the Collector of Sultanpur district, Uttar Pradesh at the age of 32. He held the position until 22 July 1982. He moved to the PMO as Deputy Secretary when Rajiv Gandhi took over as PM in 1985. He worked at the Rajiv Gandhi Foundation and as Officer on Special Duty to Sonia Gandhi.

In 2004, when United Progressive Alliance came to power, he returned to PMO serving as Joint Secretary to Government of India before being promoted as Secretary to Government of India.

In 2012, he was awarded the C.F. Andrews Distinguished Alumni Award by the St. Stephen's College, Delhi.

== Controversies and allegations ==
File notings available with India Today show that Pulok Chatterji, a senior official in the PMO in 2007-08, was fully aware of A. Raja's dubious decision-making in 2G spectrum case. In this note, Chatterji basically agrees that spectrum can be allotted on payment of normal fees—the existing usual fee of Rs 1,658 crore—which is what the nine licensees forked out for a pan-Indian footprint.

As Joint Secretary in the PMO, Chatterji wrote a note on 3 December 2004, favouring Kalmadi's appointment citing the host city contract and precedent of the 1982 Asian Games. Chatterji's note said Kalmadi should head the OC, but recommended caveats to address concerns raised by then sports minister Sunil Dutt.

In 2013, several reports state that he was responsible for tampering of the CBI coalgate report.

== See also ==
- The Accidental Prime Minister
