= Anya (2022 film) =

- Theatrical release poster
- Directed by: Simmy
- Screenplay by: Simmy
- Produced by: Shelna K Simmy
- Starring: Atul Kulkarni; Raima Sen; Bhushan Pradhan; Tejashree Pradhan; Prathamesh Parab
- Cinematography: Sajan Kalathil
- Edited by: Thanuj
- Music by: Krishna Raaj; Rohit Kulkarni
- Production company: Initiative Films
- Distributed by: Panorama Studios
- Release date: 10 June 2022
- Running time: 140 minutes
- Country: India
- Languages: Marathi; Hindi

Anya (Hindi title: Anya The Other; transl. Other) is an Indian bilingual (Marathi & Hindi) crime film written and directed by Simmy and produced by Initiative Films in association with Capitalwood Pictures. The film features Atul Kulkarni, Raima Sen, Bhushan Pradhan, Prathamesh Parab.

== Cast ==
- Atul Kulkarni
- Raima Sen
- Bhushan Pradhan
- Tejashree Pradhan
- Prathamesh Parab
- Krutika Deo
- Sunil Tawade
- Govind Namdev
- Deepak Pandey
- Ushpal Sharma

== Awards ==
The film won two awards: Best Film at the Alvisbein Film Festival in Sweden, Best First Time Director and Best Picture at the Falcon International Film Festival (June 2021) in London. The film has won accolades at the Global Indian International Film Festival and the Toronto Independent Festival.

== Release ==
Anya was theatrically released on 10 June 2022.
