= The Turn of the Tortoise =

2015 book by T. N. Ninan

The Turn of the Tortoise: The Challenge and Promise of India's Future
- First Indian edition
- Author: T.N. Ninan
- Language: English
- Subject: Politics of India, Economy of India
- Publisher: Allen Lane (UK); Penguin India
- Publication date: 9 October 2015
- Publication place: India
- Pages: 368
- ISBN: 9780670088645

The Turn of the Tortoise: The Challenge and Promise of India's Future is a 2015 book by T.N. Ninan, a writer and journalist.

The book analyses the economy of India, trends in politics, China-India relations, the size of the middle class and the Aam Aadmi Party amongst other issues.

== Reception ==
In the Hindustan Times Gaurav Choudhury describes the book as "insightful" and a "useful analytical framework to understand the multiple variables that influence India's economy, polity and society". Economist and author Dr Surjit Bhalla in The Financial Express also praised the book as a "well-documented, thoroughly-researched and extremely well-written book"
