= Miss Match (film) =

- Film poster
- मिस मॅच
- Directed by: Girish Vasaikar
- Written by: Nitin Dixit
- Produced by: Alok Shrivastava
- Starring: Bhushan Pradhan; Mrinmayee Kolwalkar; Uday Tikekar; Bhalchandra Kadam; Ashutosh Kulkarni; Sandeep Deshpande
- Cinematography: Bharani Kannan
- Edited by: Arvind Tyagi; Debesh Meher (Promo Editor)
- Music by: Neeraj
- Production companies: Gold Coin Entertainment
- Distributed by: Gold Coin Entertainment
- Release date: 12 December 2014
- Running time: 162 Minutes
- Country: India
- Language: Marathi

Miss Match (Marathi: मिस मॅच ) is a 2014 Marathi romantic drama film directed by Girish Vasaikar. The film is about the journey of Priya and her search for her perfect match. It has been acclaimed by Marathi audience as Karan Johar Movie. Critical reception was positive.

== Plot ==
Miss Match is a story of a girl named Priya (Mrinmai Kolwalkar) and her search for her perfect match. Priya is the only daughter of a U.S based N.R.I businessman Suryakant Samarth (Uday Tikekar). Like every father Suryakant Samarth wants his daughter to get married. But Priya doesn't believe in arranged marriages and asks her father to give her a time of 2 years in which she will find a perfect match for herself, she also convinces him to send her to Pune for her post graduation course.

Her father agrees but puts a condition that if she fails to do so in the given time she will have to marry a person of his choice.

One and half years is already over and Priya has not found her match yet but Priya has still not given up hope.

Mira who is Priya's cousin, college mate & confidante suggests her to imagine and visualise the man she is longing for and assures her of finding the man of her dream by doing so. Priya follows that and suddenly declares to her friends of having a boyfriend. She describes in detail her imaginary boyfriend his name, looks, job etc. Her friends are shocked by this impromptu boyfriend theory. But to Priya's surprise a man called Raj (Bhushan Pradhan) enters her life and his profile matches completely to the imaginary profile created by her. Priya confronts Raj and asks him to reveal his identity to her, he denies but at the same time takes efforts to win her confidence and create a place for himself in Priya's life.

Priya's situation gets more complicated since Raj keeps his identity concealed but continues to pursue her and on the other hand the given time is running out and her father is lining up marriage proposals for her.

The pressure, confusion and dilemma is built up in Priya's life.

Does Priya find a solution, does she go ahead to find out the truth of Raj or does she give up on her dreams and settle for her father's choice? All the queries, confusion and the struggle to find a girls perfect match is beautifully concluded in the film Miss Match.

== Reception ==
Miss Match was released in Maharashtra and Karnataka. The film has received highly positive reviews.

== Cast ==
- Bhushan Pradhan as Raj
- Mrinmayee Kolwalkar as Priya
- Uday Tikekar as Priya's Father
- Bhalchandra Kadam as Bhau
- Ashutosh Kulkarni as Amit
- Sandeep Deshpande as Raj's Father
- Mugdha Shah as Raj's Mother
- Ananya as Meera
- Sayali Deodhar as Ashwini
- Gayatri Deshmukh as Shweta
- Jaiwant Bhalekar as Ranga The Mechanic
- Raseek Raj as Omkar
- Vishal Kulthe as Rohit
- Om Jangam as Amar
- Tony as Goon

== Soundtrack ==
Miss Match

Soundtrack album by Neeraj
- Released: 12 November 2014
- Genre: Feature film soundtrack
- Length: 18:53
- Label: Zee Music Company

The soundtrack was composed entirely by Neeraj, who is professionally a doctor. The lyrics were written by Ashish Panat who is also a doctor. The music album was released on 12 November 2014 alongside a theatrical trailer.

No.	Title	Singer(s)	Length
1	"Ashi Lajri"	Sonu Nigam, Bela Shende	5:01
2	"Bolna"	Hariharan	5:11
3	"Samajale"	Asha Bhosle	4:25
4	"Yo Yo"	Avadhoot Gupte and Chorus	4:16
