= Shagird (2011 film) =

- Directed by: Tigmanshu Dhulia
- Written by: Tigmanshu Dhulia; Kamal Pandey
- Produced by: Hussain Shaikh; Purvi Lavingia-Vats
- Starring: Nana Patekar; Zakir Hussain; Mohit Ahlawat; Rimi Sen; Anurag Kashyap
- Cinematography: Yogesh Jani
- Edited by: Pravin Angre
- Music by: Abhishek Ray
- Production company: Faizee Production
- Distributed by: Reliance Entertainment
- Release date: 13 May 2011
- Running time: 128 minutes
- Country: India
- Language: Hindi

Shagird (transl. Disciple) is a 2011 Indian Hindi-language action thriller film directed by Tigmanshu Dhulia. An adaptation of Bengali film Ghatak (2006), the film also borrows inspirations from American film Training Day (2001). It stars Nana Patekar, Mohit Ahlawat, Rimi Sen, Zakir Hussain, and Anurag Kashyap. The film was released on 13 May 2011. Despite positive reviews from critics, the film failed to perform well commercially.

== Plot ==
The film opens with gangster Bunty Bhaiya being arrested in Ghaziabad. In Delhi, Sub-inspector Mohit Kumar joins the crime branch under senior inspector Hanumant Singh. There he meets Singh's team, who are playing both sides of a dispute between a builder and the local land mafia.

Hanumant visits the leader of the land mafia under false pretenses and kills the entire gang, with the unwitting support of news reporter Varsha Mathur. Later, he claims to the media that the gang are wanted terrorists. Threats by the underworld against Hanumant and his family escalate, and he asks his wife and son to leave the country as soon as possible.

Bunty Bhaiya has been transferred to Delhi jail, where he befriends two terrorists. Hanumant takes Mohit to a local politician, Rajmani Yadav, and Rajmani informs the cops about a drug deal that is going to take place. Hanumant sabotages the deal and kills the dealers, then steals the drugs and money slated to change hands. During the chaos, Mohit proves his worth and saves Hanumant's life. Meanwhile, three journalists are kidnapped by a terrorist who asks for the release of Bunty Bhaiya along with other terrorists.

The government accedes to the demands, but Hanumant kills the two terrorists and takes Bunty into his safe house, revealing that the kidnapping was an elaborate ruse planned by Hanumant. At the safe house, he records Bunty's confessions, which implicate Rajmani. Mohit tips Hanumant about Rajmani's plot to betray him, resulting in Hanumant killing his colleague Shamsher and staging it as suicide. He then blackmails Rajmani over Bunty's confession video, demanding ₹ 15 crore (₹ 150,000,000).

Rajmani makes another attempt on Hanumant's life, but Mohit saves his life again by getting him to the hospital in the nick of time. There, Hanumant realizes that Mohit is an agent of Rajmani, though unbeknownst to Hanumant he has had a change of heart. Hanumant offers to share his ransom money with Mohit, and the two men plot to extract it from Rajmani.

Hanumant reveals that the video also implicates Mohit, and extorts Rajmani into upping the ransom amount to ₹ 25 crore. Mohit and Hanumant split the cash, unaware that Mohit's bag contains a tracking device. Hanumant tips the locals off about Rajmani's location, causing a scene and attracting media attention. Rajmani eliminates Bunty in his car, not realizing that he is being filmed; he is soon arrested by the police.

Rajmani's gang tracks Mohit and engages in a shootout, from which there are no survivors. Meanwhile, Hanumant is betrayed by his money transfer agent Kamlesh, who shoots him upon seeing the huge sum of money that Hanumant plans to transfer to his family overseas. Kamlesh cites that he has his own family to feed. He calls a phone number to confirm that the deed is done; the phone is shown to be ringing under Mohit's corpse. Kamlesh walks away while Hanumant dies listening to old Bollywood songs playing on the TV.

== Cast ==
- Nana Patekar as Hanumant Singh
- Zakir Hussain as Rajmani Singh Yadav
- Rimi Sen as Varsha Mathur
- Mohit Ahlawat as Mohit Kumar
- Anurag Kashyap as Bunty Bhaiya
- Sitaram Panchal as Pandit
- Murali Sharma as Vijay Jindal
- Vishwajeet Pradhan as Ali
- Khan Jahangir Khan as Shamsher
- Ashok Pandey as Inspector Shukla
- Kishori Shahane as Mrs. Hanumant Singh
- Shrivallabh Vyas as Mohit's Father
- Gargi Patel as Varsha's Mother
- Hrishita Bhatt as Special appearance
- Kamal Malik as Rajmani's side kick
- Veerendra Saxena as Kamlesh (Money Launderer)
- Rajiv Gupta as Rajbir (Police officer)
- Tigmanshu Dhulia (Cameo) as pedestrian near India Gate listening to music in the radio

== Soundtrack ==
The soundtrack was composed by Abhishek Ray. It only features one track "Kaisi Talab Hai" sung by Kunal Ganjawala.

== Reception ==
Nikhat Kazmi of The Times of India gave the movie a 3 1/2 star rating saying "Watch the film for its topicality. Shagird holds up a hard-hitting mirror on India: corrupt to the core, India: permanently scarred by the unholy nexus between tainted politicians, ruthless gangsters and dishonest cops". Taran Adarsh called the movie a power packed and well made film but blamed the awareness and low hype for the movie giving it a 3/5 star rating.
