= Rashtriya Samaj Paksha =

Political party in Maharashtra, India

Rashtriya Samaj Paksha (RSP)
- Leader: Mahadev Jankar
- Founder: Mahadev Jankar
- Headquarters: Mumbai, Maharashtra
- ECI Status: Unrecognised
- Alliance: MahaYuti (2014–2023,2024-present)
- Seats in Maharashtra Legislative Assembly: 1 / 288
- Seats in Maharashtra Legislative Council: 0 / 78

Website
- rashtriyasamaj.org

Rashtriya Samaj Paksha ("National Society Party") is an Indian political party based in Maharashtra, founded in 2003. Mahadev Jankar was the founder and president of the party. Prabodhankar Govindram Shurnar, hailing from Nanded, has dedicated himself to social work in his community since 1990. Govindram Shurnar and Mahadev Jankar first met during an event in Mumbai, and this encounter paved the way for Jankar to launch their endeavors in Marathwada, with Shurnar's support. In the 1998 Lok Sabha elections in Nanded, Jankar ran as a BSP candidate and garnered around 20,000 votes. Shurnar and their family played a significant role in managing the responsibilities for that election.

In the 2004 Maharashtra Assembly elections, the party fielded 38 candidates and received 144,758 votes, 0.35% of all votes. In the 2004 Lok Sabha elections, the party fielded 12 candidates in Maharashtra and one in the Karnataka state. The party received 146,571 votes, 0.04% of the total votes polled. In the 2009 Loksabha elections, the RSP fielded 29 candidates in Maharashtra, two in Assam, one in Gujarat, and one in Karnataka, being 23rd in many candidates. They received 190,743 votes in Maharashtra and 201,065 in total. Jankar contested against Sharad Pawar and Subhash Deshmukh in Madha and received 10.76% of the votes.

== Maharashtra Assembly Elections, 2009 ==
In the Maharashtra Assembly Elections, Rashtriya Samaj Paksha was part of the Republican Left Democratic Front, popularly known as Ridalos. RSP candidate, Babasaheb Patil won from Ahmedpur.

== Lok Sabha Election 2014 ==
Rashtriya Samaj Paksha joined the NDA in January 2019. During the 2014 general election, Rashtriya Samaj Paksha fought with NDA along with its allies BJP, Republican Party of India (Athvale) and Swabhimani Shetkari Saghtana.

== Maharashtra Assembly Elections, 2014 ==
In the 2014 Maharashtra Assembly elections, Rashtriya Samaj Paksha was part of the Mahayuti alliance. They fielded six candidates in Maharashtra Assembly Elections, out of which RSP candidate Rahul Kul from Daund won.

== 2024 maharashtra assembly elections ==
In the 2024 Maharashtra Assembly elections, Ratnakar Gutte of the Rashtriya Samaj Paksha won the constituency of Gangakhed by a margin of 26,292 votes, after which he chose to support the Maha Yuti alliance, stating that the alliance had supported his election.

== President ==
- Mahadev Jankar

== Notable leaders ==
- Ratnakar Gutte, MLA Gangakhed, Maharashtra State President

== See also ==
- List of political parties in India
