= Dilip Chenoy =

Indian businessman (born 1958)

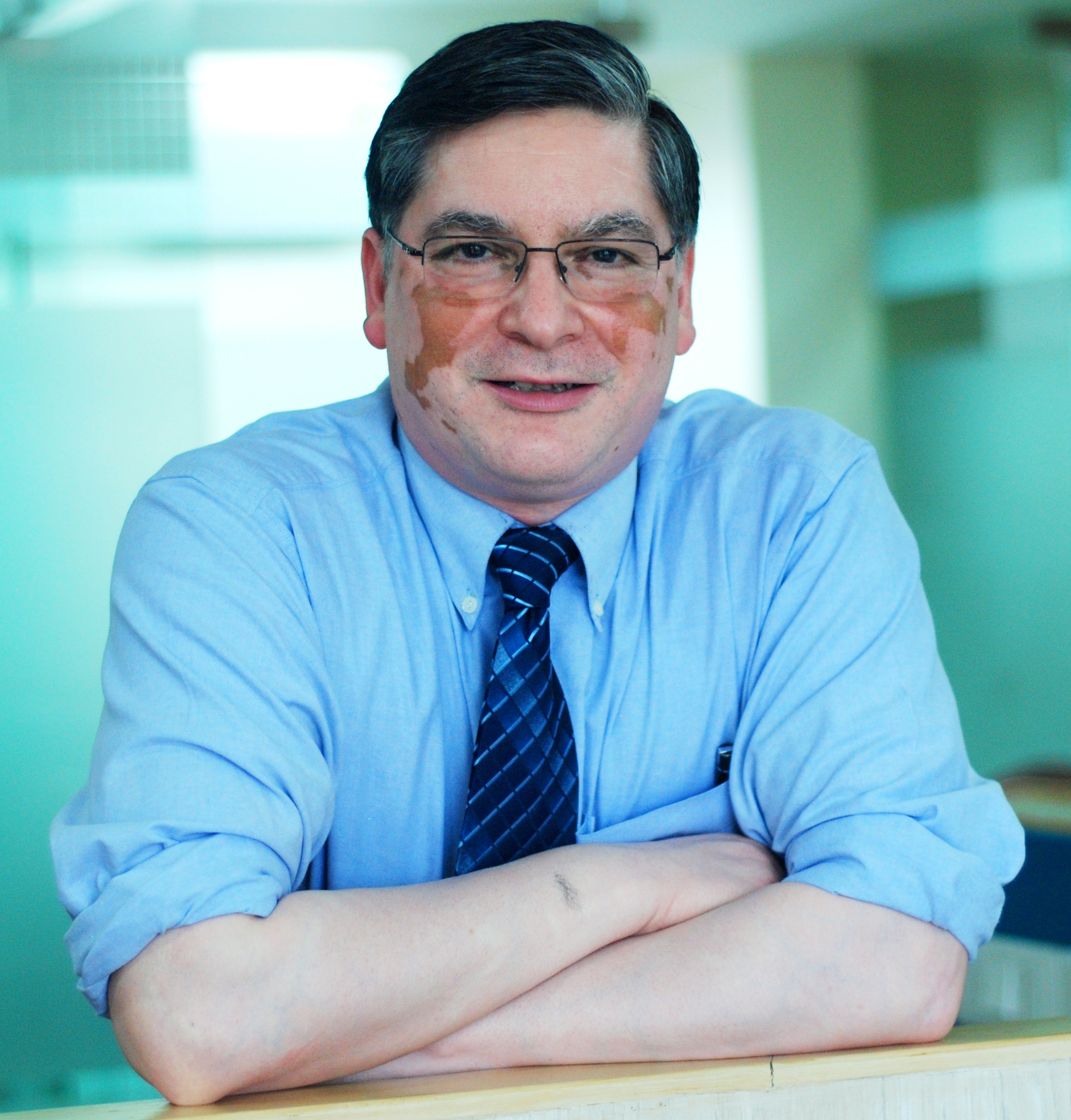
- Chenoy in 2013
- Education: Delhi University
- Occupation: Secretary General of FICCI
- Employer: FICCI

Dilip Harel Mitra Chenoy is an Indian businessman. In April 2018, he was appointed Secretary General of FICCI, a leading industry body in India. He was earlier the Managing Director and CEO of National Skill Development Corporation (NSDC), a public-private partnership formed under Section 25 of the Companies Act 1956, from 7 May 2010 to 8 October 2015.

== Career ==
Chenoy spearheaded NSDC for 5 years which aims to skill 150 million Indians by 2022 and hence contributed in harnessing India's demographic dividend.

== Publications ==
Cheonyhas authored numerous articles in journals on environment, automotive industry as well as several newspaper articles on industry and skill development.

1. Chapter on Education and Health, a special focus addition on Uttar Pradesh – Leveraging the Demographic Dividend in Uttar Pradesh
2. Public-Private Partnerships to Meet the Skills challenges in India, in Skills Development for Inclusive and Sustainable Growth in Developing Asia-Pacific (181 – 194). Asian Development Bank/Springer – 2013
3. Skill Development in India - A Transformation in the Making, in India Infrastructure Report 2012 (pp 199–207), Routledge – 2012
4. Skill Development in India: Moving from a supply-side model to Demand led interventions, in IILM Management Review Vol 1, Issue 1 – 2012
5. Skill development coming of age in India on 7 December 2012 on adbskilldevelopment.wordpress.com
6. Business Today: 'Skills training will become more affordable and accessible' on 28 February 2013
7. Industry support is critical on Peoplematters.in
8. Top 12 trends : Talent crunch & skill gap on Peoplematters.in
9. The strategic shift required is on thinking of tomorrow on Peoplematters.in
10. It costs about 9000 to skill a person on Peoplematter.in
