= T.N. Ninan =

Indian journalist (born 1950)

- Born: 1950 (age 75–76)
- Citizenship: India
- Education: MA Economics, University of Madras
- Occupation: Journalist
- Employer: Business Standard
- Notable work: The Turn of the Tortoise

T. N. Ninan (born 1950) is an Indian journalist and economist. He was Chairman and Editorial Director at Business Standard. He won the 1991 B. D. Goenka award for excellence in journalism. The Mumbai Press Club awarded him the 2016 RedInk Lifetime achievement award.

== Career ==
Ninan obtained his MA in Economics from the University of Madras in 1972. In the 1980´s he was executive editor at India Today. In 1992 he joined Business Standard. In 2013, Ninan received the Jahwarlal Nehru Fellowship for the project India:the Next Decade, which resulted in the book The Turn of the Tortoise. In 2021, Ninan retired as Chairman and Director of Business Standard.

== Publications ==
- The Turn of the Tortoise, Penguin India 2015
- Weekend Ruminations, weekly column in Business Standard.

== Awards ==
- 1991 B. D. Goenka award
- 2013 Jahwarlal Nehru Fellowship
- 2016 RedInk Lifetime Achievement Award, Mumbai Press Club
