= The Accidental Prime Minister =

2014 memoir by Sanjaya Baru

- First edition
- Author: Sanjaya Baru
- Subject: Politics
- Genre: Memoir
- Published: 20 April 2014 (Penguin)
- Publication place: India
- Media type: Hardcover
- Pages: 320
- ISBN: 978-0670086740

The Accidental Prime Minister: The Making and Unmaking of Manmohan Singh is a 2014 memoir by Indian policy analyst Sanjaya Baru, who was Prime Minister Manmohan Singh's media advisor from May 2004 to August 2008. Published by Penguin India, the book alleges that Singh was not entirely in control of his cabinet—or even the Prime Minister's Office (PMO). Instead, significant power was wielded by the Congress party's president Sonia Gandhi, to whom Singh was completely "subservient". "There cannot be two centres of power", Baru remembers Singh explaining to him, "That creates confusion. I have to accept that the party president is the centre of power. The government is answerable to the party."

The PMO released a statement the day The Accidental Prime Minister was released, dismissing the veracity of the memoir, "It is an attempt to misuse a privileged position and access to high office to gain credibility and to apparently exploit it for commercial gain. The commentary smacks of fiction and coloured views of a former adviser." Baru's reply to the PMO's charges was "I am amused." Baru told The Indian Express, "most of the book is positive [about the PM]" and that he wrote it mainly because Singh "has become an object of ridicule, not admiration. I am showing him as a human being, I want there to be empathy for him."

According to The Guardian, "Such an intimate portrait of dysfunction will certainly have political ramifications", especially since India is in the midst of a general election. Spokespersons of the Bharatiya Janata Party, the chief opposition party, posed a series of questions to Singh and Sonia Gandhi on the basis of The Accidental Prime Minister's revelations, "did the PM refuse to take daily briefings from intelligence agencies and did this not have a bearing on our security situation? ... Did the PM forfeit his prerogative to decide on who would be in his cabinet? Was the '2G fame' A Raja appointed at the behest of Sonia Gandhi? Did the PM knowingly overlook corruption by his colleagues as alleged in the book. Did 2G, CWG and Coalgate happen because of this?"

== Film adaptation ==
A film adaptation of the book with Anupam Kher portraying the role of Manmohan Singh was released on 11 January 2019. The film garnered a lot of attention and stirred controversy. In the wake of the 2019 Lok Sabha elections, the movie was cited as a propaganda created by the then ruling party, BJP. Although, the filmmakers have completely denied these allegations.
