= The Economic Times =

Indian financial newspaper

- The 9 July 2021 front page of The Economic Times
- Type: Daily newspaper
- Format: Broadsheet
- Owner: The Times Group
- Publisher: Bennett, Coleman & Co. Ltd.
- Editor: Sruthijith Kurupichankandy
- Founded: 6 March 1961; 65 years ago
- Language: English
- Headquarters: Times House, DN Road, Mumbai, India
- Country: India
- Circulation: 269,882 daily (as of 2023)
- Sister newspapers: The Times of India; Navbharat Times; Maharashtra Times; Ei Samay Sangbadpatra; Vijaya Karnataka
- ISSN: 0013-0389
- OCLC number: 61311680
- Website: economictimes.indiatimes.com (BFSI vertical)

The Economic Times is an Indian English-language business-focused daily newspaper. Published by The Times Group, The Economic Times began publication in 1961 and it is sold in all major cities in India. As of 2012, it is the world's second-most widely read English language business newspaper, after The Wall Street Journal with a daily readership of over 800,000. According to the Audit Bureau of Circulations, the newspaper's circulation averaged 269,882 copies during the latter half of 2022. It is published simultaneously in 19 cities: Mumbai, Bangalore, Delhi, Chennai, Kolkata, Lucknow, Hyderabad, Jaipur, Ahmedabad, Nagpur, Chandigarh, Pune, Patna, Ranchi, Indore, Bhopal, Bhubaneshwar, Kochi, and Goa. Its main content is based on the Indian economy, international finance, share prices, and prices of commodities as well as other matters related to finance. The founding editor of the paper when it was launched in 1961 was P. S. Hariharan. The editor of The Economic Times is Bodhisattva Ganguli.

== Other ventures ==
In June 2009, The Economic Times launched a television channel called ET Now. In 2018, the house of The Economic Times launched a member-only platform called ET Prime. It claims to be a business storytelling platform. ET Prime's editor (2022) is Shishir Prasad.

The Economic Times has a portfolio management tool called ET Portfolio. The Economic Times also launched ETHRWorld and ETBrandEquity. Author-Publicist Aatish Jaisinghani has also been featured on Economic Times for his take on the shift in audience dynamics and the impact on brand remunerations with National brand campaignsm as well as thriving in female dominated industries on World PR Day. In 2017, The Economic Times launched the ET Hindi website for the business news in Hindi. In 2022, The Economic Times launched its website in the seven other Indian languages, creating: ET Gujarati; ET Marathi; ET Bengali; ET Tamil; ET Malayalam; ET Telugu; and ET Kannada.

== Editors ==
- 1960s and 1970s: P. S. Hariharan (1961–1964), D. K. Rangnekar (1964–1979)
- 1980s: Hannan Ezekiel, Manu Shroff (1985–1990)
- Early to mid 1990s: Jaideep Bose, T. N. Ninan, Swaminathan Anklesaria Aiyar
- 2004: Rajrishi Singhal and Rahul Joshi
- 2010 to 2015: Rahul Joshi
- 2015 to date: Bodhisatva Ganguli

== See also ==
- List of newspapers in India by circulation
