= Killing of Alexis Sharkey =

2020 murder in Houston, Texas, US

- Alexis Sharkey in October 2020
- Location: Houston, Texas, U.S.
- Date: November 27, 2020
- Target: Alexis Leigh Robinault Sharkey
- Attack type: Strangulation
- Accused: Thomas Sharkey (deceased)

Alexis Leigh Sharkey (née Robinault) was a 26-year-old American social media influencer who was last seen alive around 6 p.m. on November 27, 2020. The next day, her naked body was found near her home; she had been strangled. On October 5, 2021, her 49-year-old husband, Thomas Sharkey, killed himself as he was about to be arrested.

== Background ==
Alexis Sharkey was born Alexis Leigh Robinault in Warren, Pennsylvania. She grew up in Youngsville, Pennsylvania, and graduated from Youngsville High School in 2012. In 2016, she graduated from the University of Pittsburgh at Bradford with a major in biology and minors in nutrition and psychology.

Sharkey worked for multi-level marketing company Monat, which sells haircare, skincare and wellness products. She made regular posts to her Instagram and TikTok accounts. Her mother described her as health-conscious, saying her daughter loved selling organic healthcare products. Alexis Robinault and Tom Sharkey had married on December 20, 2019.

In October 2020, Sharkey visited Marfa, Texas, with several friends, who later claimed that she was clearly afraid of someone and worried for her safety. She shared her last Instagram post on November 22, 2020, documenting her travels to Tulum, Mexico. On November 25 she spoke with her mother. On the morning of November 26 (Thanksgiving), the couple shared a meal.

== Disappearance and discovery ==
Sharkey was last seen alive on the evening of November 27. Tom stated, "She understood me. I understood her. We didn't fight when she left. I just told her she couldn't drive under the influence; She left anyhow. This is where we're at." Sharkey, who friends later said was usually inseparable from her phone, stopped responding to messages and calls.

On November 28, Tom told family members that she was missing. He thanked Instagram followers for their help in the investigation while condemning others who said negative things about Sharkey's disappearance. Over the following days, he said that he was receiving death threats and other hateful messages.

Sharkey's nude body was discovered around 8 a.m. on November 28, in bushes on the 1000 block of Red Haw Lane in the Houston Energy Corridor in Harris County. Her body was believed to have been left overnight and police saw no evidence that she walked down the road, nor that there had been any attempt to conceal her body. The next morning, Tom identified her body at the Harris County Medical Examiner's Office.

In an interview with ABC 13 Eyewitness News Houston, Tom said that his wife was not as happy as she presented herself on social media, and that he had been struggling emotionally since her disappearance, but that their marriage was happy. He said that he had been cooperating with detectives, but he ended the conversation by saying, "I'm sorry. I'm sorry. I'm not a jerk, I'm just destroyed."

The case was the subject of Episode 3 of the documentary series TikTok: Murder Gone Viral.

== Police investigation ==
About two weeks after the murder, Tom left Texas. When he failed to make funeral arrangements for Alexis, the medical examiner changed her next of kin to her mother. A private funeral was held on December 19; the service was kept secret from Tom. On January 19, 2021, the Harris County Institute of Forensic Science medical examiner's report determined that Sharkey's death was a homicide and she had been strangled.

After many attempts by police to contact him, Tom agreed to meet detectives in early August 2021 to submit a DNA sample, but failed to do so. On September 29, police obtained a warrant for his arrest, later stating that he was the only person who had the means, motive, and opportunity to kill Alexis.

On October 5, officials learned Tom was staying with his daughter and her partner in Fort Myers, Florida. On October 6, at about 1 a.m., After learning that police were going to arrest him, Tom ran upstairs and shot himself in the head.

Authorities later said that Tom had been untruthful and evasive with investigators, and that there was a history of domestic violence between him and Alexis.
