= Mahek Bukhari =

British-Pakistani social media influencer (born 1999)

May Bukhari
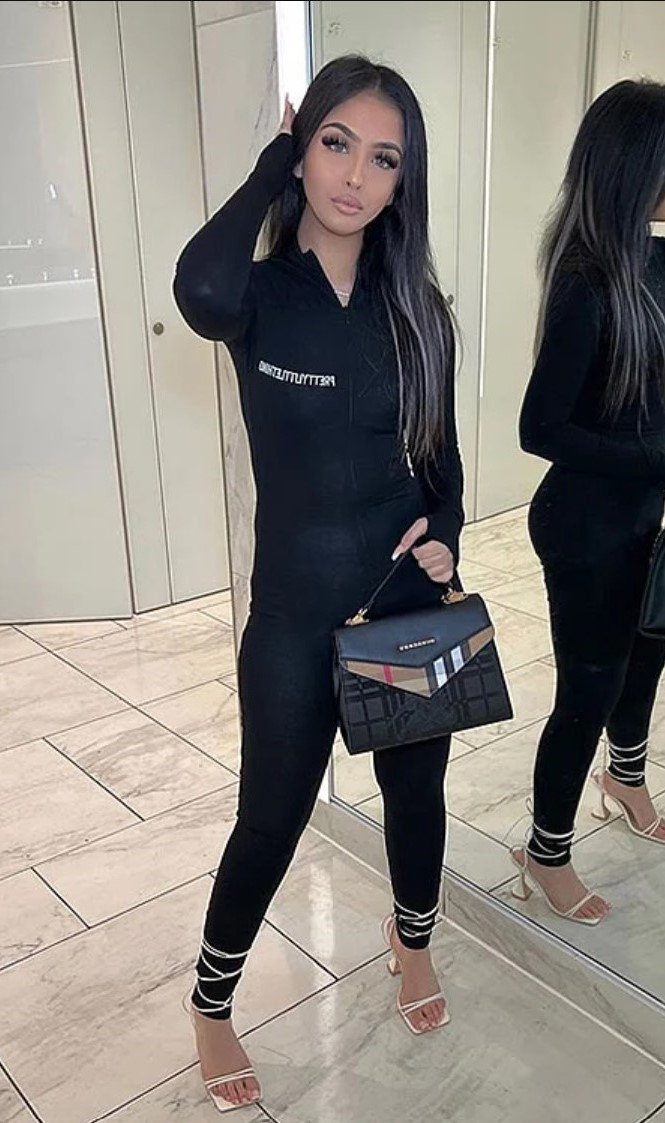
- May Bukhari in 2021
- Born: 1999; New York, USA
- Other name: May B
- Education: Manchester Metropolitan University
- Occupation: Social media
- Years active: 2017–2023
- Known for: Social media content on fashion, beauty and lifestyle
- Criminal charge: 2 counts of Murder
- Criminal penalty: Life imprisonment (minimum term of 31 years and 8 months, reduced to 26 years and 285 days on appeal)
- Criminal status: Incarcerated at HM Prison Downview
- Parent: Ansreen Bukhari (mother)

Signature
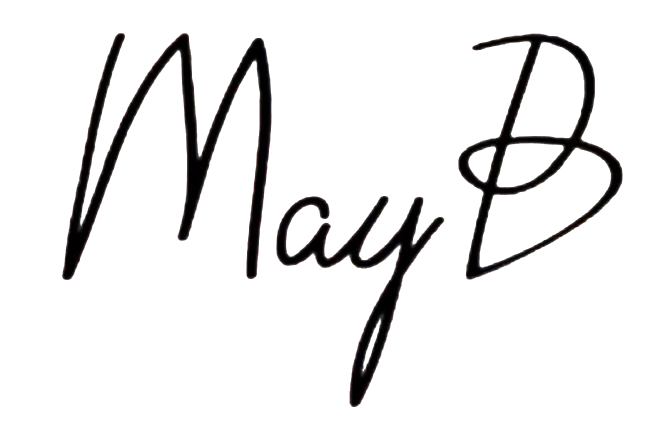

Mahek Bukhari (Urdu: مہک بخاری; born 1999), is a British former social media influencer and a double convicted murderer. Known online by the name May B and her social media handle MayBVlogs, she built a following through lifestyle, beauty and fashion videos on social media platforms; TikTok, Instagram and YouTube between 2017 and 2022. Her first vlog, My Trip to Istanbul was released on 1 November 2017.

In 2023, she was convicted of the murders of two men following a car crash in Leicestershire. Subsequently, she appeared in various documentaries and TV shows including The Big Cases (2023), Ray William Johnson: True Crime (2023), TikTok: Murder Gone Viral (2024), Deadly Influence: The Social Media Murders (2026), and 20/20 Britain's Most Notorious Crime Investigations (2026), amongst others.

== Life and career ==
=== Early life and education: 1999-2016 ===
Bukhari was born in New York, United States, to British Pakistani parents. Her family resettled back in Stoke-on-Trent, Staffordshire when she was 2 years old. Her mother, Ansreen, was a businesswoman who owned a private security company and later became known for her involvement in her daughter's online career, where she appeared alongside her. Bukhari attended Mill Hill Primary Academy and later St Margaret Ward Catholic Academy, in Tunstall, Stoke-on-Trent.

At 18, she enrolled at Manchester Metropolitan University to study fashion; however, she did not complete her degree and dropped out, instead choosing to pursue social media work full-time.

=== Career: 2017-2022 ===
Bukhari began creating content on YouTube and TikTok in 2017 under the handle MayBVlogs. Her videos focused on beauty tutorials, product recommendations, fashion hauls and lifestyle vlogs.

She often collaborated with small and medium-sized fashion brands, including online boutiques and cosmetics companies, promoting items through affiliate links and paid posts. Some of the larger brands she had deals with included PrettyLittleThing, Shein and H&M.

On 10 November 2020, she launched her own online retail company, Shoplers Direct, specialising in women’s fashion and accessories, where she served as Director.

By 2021, she had gained just shy of 200,000 followers on TikTok and 50,000 followers on Instagram. Her content frequently featured her mother, and the duo became recognised for their dynamic videos showcasing family relationships and contemporary South Asian culture. Several regional lifestyle outlets profiled her as part of a new generation of British influencers from multicultural backgrounds. Bukhari was known for collaborating with Brit Asia TV associates such as Raxstar, whom she used to review and promote restaurant locations with.

Mahek also used to take her mother along to events and parties she was invited to, which often also put Ansreen in the spotlight.

She was featured in local press and online magazines as part of a growing community of British–Asian influencers blending traditional and modern aesthetics. Her content emphasised empowerment, body positivity, and self-confidence, and she described her platform as a place to “inspire young women to express themselves through fashion and creativity.”

=== Conviction and Legacy: 2023-present ===
Following Mahek Bukhari's conviction for the Murder of Saqib Hussain and Hashim Ijazuddin, the case attracted significant media attention and has been the subject of several documentaries and true crime podcasts. Her story was first documentarised by BBC's crime anthology series; The Big Cases on 1 September 2023 in an episode called "Deadly Influence".. Mahek was also featured in Ray William Johnson's: True Crime series which aired on 17 October 2023.

Most notably, she was featured in the promotional episode of ITV's most viewed documentary series; TikTok: Murder Gone Viral which was released on 30 January 2024. She was also featured on the promotional posters for the documentary series.

Bukhari has also appeared, through archival audio recordings in various podcasts, including; Ghastly Women: Episode 46 (16 November 2022), This Day in Crime (31 January 2024), RottenMango: Episode 304 (9 October 2025), The Desi Crime Podcast: Episode 195 (14 June 2026), amongst others.

On 21 June 2026, a 2-part documentary was released on Amazon Prime titled TikTok: The Mother & Daughter Killers. Unilke other documentaries on the crime, this one was noted for not only interviewing the police investigating the crime and the victims' families but also those who have worked with and were close to Mahek Bukhari. On 30 July 2026, a six-part spin-off documentary series, 20/20 Britain's Most Notorious Crime Investigations, premiered on Disney+ in the United Kingdom and Ireland and on Disney+ and Hulu in the United States. Bukhari was the subject of episode six and covered her criminal case through interviews with individuals connected to the investigations and archival material.

== Personal life ==
Bukhari has spoken in interviews about balancing cultural expectations with an online career, noting that her family initially had reservations about social media as a profession.

Bukhari described herself as a "homebody" who valued time with family and travel experiences. Her early videos and livestreams often included discussions about university life, mental health, and the challenges of influencer culture.

Before her conviction, Bukhari was viewed as part of a new wave of self-made internet personalities who built followings without traditional celebrity pathways. She was described by regional media as “charismatic, confident and business-minded”. After the trial, journalists and commentators discussed the case as an example of the darker pressures of influencer culture, including reputation management and online performance.

== Murder conviction ==
=== Murder of Saqib Hussain and Hashim Ijazuddin ===
In early 2019, Mahek's mother, Ansreen Bukhari, was involved in a relationship with Saqib Hussain, an 18 year old from Banbury, Oxfordshire. The relationship ended after approximately three years, but Hussain later began contacting Ansreen with repeated demands for money. According to court evidence, he threatened to share intimate photographs and videos of their relationship with her husband and son if she did not pay him £3,000, money that he said he had spent of gifted to Ansreen over the three years of their relationship.

The prosecution stated that the threats caused distress to Ansreen, and Mahek became involved after learning of the situation. She later messaged friends suggesting she would "get him jumped" (slang for physically assaulting someone), in order to stop the blackmail, though she denied intending serious harm.

On 11 February 2022, Hussain and his friend, Mohammed Hashim Ijazuddin, travelled from Banbury to Leicester, believing they would meet with Ansreen to retrieve money and resolve the dispute. Bukhari, her mother, and several associates arranged to confront them in a car park at a Tesco in Hamilton, Leicester. When the men arrived, a pursuit ensued along the A46 dual carriageway involving two cars driven by Bukhari's friends, an Audi TT and a Seat Leon. During the chase, the victims’ Škoda Fabia was forced off the road at speeds exceeding 100 mph. The vehicle struck the central reservation, split in two and caught fire, killing both occupants instantly.

==== Trial and conviction ====
A ten-week trial at Leicester Crown Court concluded in August 2023. The jury found Mahek and Ansreen Bukhari guilty of two counts of murder. Four other defendants were convicted on related charges, two of murder and three of manslaughter.

On 1 September 2023, Mahek was sentenced to life imprisonment with a minimum term of 31 years and 8 months, where it was reported that Bukhari cried after being sentenced and blew a kiss to her father and telling him that she loves him. She was originally sent to HM Prison Peterborough, and is currently being held at HM Prison Downview.

The case was highly publicised, and became the subject various documentaries, including; TikTok: Murder Gone Viral. On 21 June 2026, a 2-part documentary was released on Amazon Prime titled TikTok: The Mother & Daughter Killers which also adapted the story into a documentary.

==== Appeal ====
In October 2025, the Court of Appeal accepted Mahek’s request to reduce her sentence, citing her young age and immaturity at the time of the offence. Mr Justice Lavender and Judge Sylvia De Bertodano found her sentence to be "manifestly excessive" and reduced the minimum term to 26 years and 285 days. It was also found that new evidence of Mr Hussain threatening to release the sexually explicit material he had of Ansreen was brought forward, which was not reflected in the fixing of the minimum term as it should have been. Bukhari will be eligible for parole in 2049.

In July 2026, Mahek's mother Ansreen and accomplices in the crime Ameer Jamal, Sanaf Gulammustafa and Natasha Akhtar also challenged their convictions. However, their appeals were dismissed, arguing that "unlike Mahek's case (which was successfully appealed), these sentences were justified".

== Filmography ==
=== Television ===
Year	Title	Role	Notes
2017	My Trip to Istanbul	Herself	Travel vlog-style documentary on Istanbul from May B's perspective.
2023	The Big Cases: Deadly Influence	Herself	BBC Documentary, featured in episode 24.
2023	Ray William Johnson: True Crime	Herself	Featured in episode 34, released on 17 October 2023.
2024	TikTok: Murder Gone Viral	Herself	ITVX highest viewed documentary, featured in episode 01. Also appears on promotional poster.
2026	TikTok: The Mother & Daughter Killers	Herself	2-Part Amazon Prime Video documentary.
2026	Deadly Influence: The Social Media Murders	Herself	Subject of Season 2, Episode 6. Discovery+ exclusive crime docuseries.
2026	20/20 Britain's Most Notorious Crime Investigations	Herself	Subject of episode 6. Disney+ and Hulu exclusive crime docuseries.

=== Podcast ===
Year	Title	Role	Notes
2022	Ghastly Women	Self	Also Guest
2023	RottenMango	Self	Audio archive
2024	This Day in Crime	Self	Audio archive
2024	Murder Files Unsealed	Self	Audio archive
2025	Social Sins - True Crime in Social Media	Self	Audio archive
2026	BONE ARCHIVE : Deep Dive History	Self	3-part podcast series which did a deep dive into Mahek Bukhari's life.
2026	The Desi Crime Podcast	Self	Audio archive

== Awards and nominations ==
Year	Award	Category	Result
2019	Brit Asia TV Music Awards	Best Social Media Star	Won
2021	Asian Media Awards	Report of the Year (Presenter)	Nominated
