= TikTok: Murder Gone Viral =

British documentary series

- Promotional poster featuring Mahek Bukhari.
- Genre: Documentary / True crime
- Created by: Nine Lives Media
- Country of origin: United Kingdom
- Original language: English
- No. of series: 2
- No. of episodes: 6

Production
- Running time: 46 minutes
- Production company: Nine Lives Media

Original release
- Network: ITVX
- Release: 30 January 2024 – 21 October 2025

Related
- Exposure

TikTok: Murder Gone Viral is a British true crime documentary series produced by Nine Lives Media for the streaming platform ITVX. The series explores murder cases that have gained widespread attention through the social media app TikTok, examining the role the platform played in the dissemination of information and public discourse surrounding these crimes. Each episode focuses on a single case, using a combination of TikTok footage, police recordings, interviews with victims' families and expert commentary from journalists and investigators.

The first series of TikTok: Murder Gone Viral premiered on 30 January 2024 and consisted of three episodes. In February 2025, the programme was renewed for a second series, which premiered on 21 October 2025.

== Production ==
TikTok: Murder Gone Viral was commissioned by ITVX in September 2023. The documentary series was produced by the Manchester-based independent production company Nine Lives Media for ITVX and ITV1. The commissioning editors were Jo Clinton-Davis, ITV’s Controller of Factual, and Sue Murphy, Head of Factual Entertainment.

The first series was produced and directed by Tom Reeves and Robin Anderson, with Cat Lewis and Jazz Gowans serving as executive producers. It was developed as a three-part documentary examining murder cases that gained attention on TikTok. Each episode combines interviews, social-media footage, police recordings, and news archives to explore how online platforms influenced public understanding of the crimes.

In February 2025, ITV announced that the programme had been renewed for a second series. The follow-up series continued to be produced by Nine Lives Media, with Katie Boyd serving as series producer and Robin Anderson returning as producer/director.

Filming for the first series included cooperation with victims’ families and local law-enforcement agencies, such as Leicestershire Police in the episode concerning the 2022 Mahek Bukhari case. The series is distributed internationally by ITV Studios.

== Episodes ==
=== Series 1 (2024) ===
No. overall	No. in season	Title		Original release date
1	1	"The Mother and Daughter Killers"	46 min	30 January 2024
Covers the murder of Saqib Hussain and Mohammed Hashim Ijazuddin by TikTok influencer Mahek Bukhari and her mother Ansreen, who arranged a fatal ambush following a blackmail threat. The episode features dashcam footage and social media clips to examine the family dynamics and public reaction.
2	2	"The Killing of Sania Khan"	46 min	30 January 2024
Focuses on the case of Sania Khan, a Pakistani-American woman who shared her experience of escaping domestic abuse on TikTok before being killed by her estranged husband. The episode explores issues of domestic violence, cultural stigma, and online advocacy.
3	3	"The Killing of Alexis Sharkey"	46 min	30 January 2024
Examines the death of Alexis Sharkey, a beauty and lifestyle influencer from Houston, Texas. The episode investigates how her polished online persona masked a troubled personal life, and the circumstances surrounding her mysterious death.

=== Series 2 (2025) ===
No. overall	No. in season	Title		Original release date
4	1	"The Killing of Charlie Cosser"	46 min	21 October 2025
Investigates the case of 17-year-old Charlie Cosser, who was fatally stabbed at a teenage party by 16-year-old Yura Varybrus. The episode highlights the campaign by Charlie's father, Martin, who turned to TikTok to raise awareness about knife crime.
5	2	"The Killing of Tristyn Bailey"	46 min	21 October 2025
Looks at the murder of 13-year-old cheerleader Tristyn Bailey in the United States.
6	3	"The Killing Of Brianna Ghey"	46 min	21 October 2025
With unique access, this episode follows the investigation which led to two convictions for 16-year-old Brianna Ghey's murder.

== Reception ==
TikTok: Murder Gone Viral received mixed reviews from critics. While some praised its relevance and timely subject matter, others questioned its execution and editorial choices. Despite the mixed critical reception, the series became one of ITV's most-watched documentary titles.

Writing for The Guardian, Leila Latif criticised the series' focus on TikTok, calling it "frequently bizarre" and arguing that it often overshadowed more meaningful insights. Although she acknowledged that the use of online footage was striking, she felt the most impactful moments came from interviews with victims' families. A listing in The Guardian's TV Tonight section called it a "chilling story," situating it within the growing trend of true-crime documentaries shaped by digital culture. It highlighted the Mahek Bukhari case as an example of how social media personas can obscure the reality behind criminal acts.

In The i Paper, Gerard Gilbert described the series as "a fascinating case, terribly told", criticising it for what he saw as superficial storytelling and over-stylisation. He argued that the series lacked depth in exploring motives and leaned too heavily on its TikTok angle. Broadcast described the series as repetitive, citing a lack of investigative depth and an overreliance on social media clips. While acknowledging the programme's topicality, the review concluded that it offered only "the bare minimum" in terms of narrative and analysis.

The BBC also reported more broadly on concerns about TikTok's role in influencing antisocial and violent behaviour among young people, echoing some of the themes raised in the series. While not a review of the programme itself, the article underlined the platform's growing relevance in criminal investigations.
