= Ddeong-gae Ddeong =

South Korean YouTube channel

YouTube information
- Channel: YouTube channel
- Subscribers: 5.29 million
- Views: 3.4 billion

Korean name
- Hangul: 떵개떵
- RR: Tteonggaetteong
- MR: Ttŏnggaettŏng
- Last updated: September 2025

Ddeong-gae Ddeong (Korean: 떵개떵) is a South Korean YouTube channel operated by brothers Lee Min-ju (이민주; stage name Ddeong-gae; born 1993) and Lee Tae-gun (이태군; stage name Gae-ddeong; born 1991). Their channel name is derived from both their stage names. The pair primarily make mukbang videos.

The pair began uploading content on the streaming platform AfreecaTV in 2014. After the duo moved to YouTube in 2015, the elder Lee stopped appearing frequently on the channel, and it has since come to primarily feature Lee Min-ju (Ddeong-gae). The YouTube channel surpassed 3 million subscribers in 2019.
