= Be Still =

Be Still may refer to:

== Albums ==
- Be Still (Dave Douglas album), 2012
- Be Still (Donna Lewis album), 2002
- Be Still, by Adrian Klumpes, 2006

== Songs ==
- "Be Still" (Yolanda Adams song), 2011
- "Be Still" (Kelly Clarkson song), 2007
- "Be Still" (The Killers song), 2012
- "Be Still", by The Beach Boys from Friends, 1968
- "Be Still", by The Fray from Scars & Stories, 2012
- "Be Still", by Peter Gabriel from Peace Together, 1993

== See also ==
- Be Still (film), a 2021 Canadian drama
- "Be Still for the Presence of the Lord", hymn written by David Evans
- "Be Still My Beating Heart", song by Sting, from his 1987 album ...Nothing Like the Sun
- "Be Still, My Soul" (hymn), a Christian hymn set to Finlandia Hymn. (Refer to separate section on song on that page)
- Be Still My Soul (Abigail album)
- Be Still My Soul (Selah album)
- Be Still Please, album by Portastatic
