= The Big Cases =

- Genre: True crime documentary
- Showrunner: Jonny McGuigan
- Country of origin: United Kingdom
- Original language: English
- No. of episodes: 55 (ongoing)

Production
- Executive producers: Jonny McGuigan; Vicky Lee
- Production locations: United Kingdom and beyond
- Running time: 11–35 minutes
- Production company: BBC News

Original release
- Network: BBC
- Release: 9 April 2022 – present

The Big Cases is a BBC true crime documentary series that first aired on 9 April 2022. The series examines notable criminal cases and court proceedings, primarily within the United Kingdom, with occasional coverage of international cases. It is broadcast on BBC News and all episodes are available on BBC iPlayer. The series, which is a co-production between the BBC's News and Nations divisions, offers an extended exploration of criminal cases, featuring investigative reporting, interviews, archival footage, and courtroom analysis, aiming to present detailed accounts of the legal processes and the individuals affected by the crimes.

The series was one of the first programmes made exclusively by BBC News for iPlayer, overseen by a dedicated team, with many programmes later going onto be transmitted on television, regionally and nationally, and internationally on the BBC News channel.

Some of the cases that the series has looked into include the murder of Sabina Nessa, the 2023 Nottingham attacks, and the killing of Lilia Valutyte.

== Reactions ==
Following the airing of the episode Deadly Browsing: The Lorry Driver in July 2022, covering the fatal A1 crash caused by lorry driver Ion Onut, he issued a public apology from prison. After the programme, Onut expressed remorse for his actions, acknowledging that using his mobile phone while driving was a serious error. He stated, "The phone was a distraction, it was a really bad choice," and offered an apology to the families of the victims, saying he felt deep regret for the lives lost and the lasting trauma caused. The documentary also featured reactions from victims’ relatives and survivors, some of whom hoped that the episode would serve as a deterrent to others.

Following the broadcast of The Big Cases episode on The Nottingham attacks in January 2024, the families of the victims expressed concerns about not being consulted during the production process. They stated that the episode did not adequately reflect their experiences or perspectives and criticised the BBC for a lack of sensitivity in its handling of the subject matter. While the BBC later referred to the episode as having represented the families in relation to subsequent coverage, the families disagreed with this characterisation. They also expressed dissatisfaction with their exclusion from the later Panorama documentary on the case, raising concerns about the BBC's overall duty of care.

== Episode list ==
Episodes of The Big Cases
| No. | Title | Description | Runtime | Year |
|---|---|---|---|---|
| 1 | The Murder of Sabina Nessa | Sabina Nessa was killed at random by a man with a history of violence. | 15 min | 2022 |
| 2 | Stabbed in a Sanctuary | Sir David Amess MP was murdered by an IS fanatic, at a meeting in a church in Southend. | 16 min | 2022 |
| 3 | The Abuser Working for MI5 | This is the story of a dangerous MI5 agent, which the government tried to keep secret. | 11 min | 2022 |
| 4 | 27 Years to Catch a Killer | Rikki Neave left for school but never came home. Decades on his killer has been jailed. | 25 min | 2022 |
| 5 | Logan Mwangi: A Boy Betrayed | Logan Mwangi was five years old when he was murdered by the people he trusted. | 27 min | 2022 |
| 6 | Deadly Browsing: The Lorry Driver | How a lorry driver, looking at dating sites while driving, went on to kill three. | 24 min | 2022 |
| 7 | My Baby: Taken, Failed, Killed | Leiland-James was taken from his mother at birth by social services. Then he was murdered. | 16 min | 2022 |
| 8 | The Doorstep Murder | Alistair Wilson was shot at his front door in 2004. Are police closing in on his killer? | 23 min | 2022 |
| 9 | The Suitcase Murderer | Revealing the killer who decapitated her friend and dumped her body. | 23 min | 2022 |
| 10 | Catching the Cult Movie Killer | Steven Craig re-enacted a torture scene from the film Reservoir Dogs burning his partner. | 22 min | 2022 |
| 11 | Killing My Children's Abuser | The mum who stabbed to death a convicted paedophile after he abused her three sons. | 24 min | 2022 |
| 12 | Killed Walking Home | Zara Aleena was killed walking back from a night out by a man labelled a "danger to any woman". | 22 min | 2022 |
| 13 | Groomed, Radicalised, Gone | The schoolgirl charged with terrorism, but found to have been exploited. | 14 min | 2022 |
| 14 | Found Under the Floor | The story of Bennylyn and Jellica who were murdered after starting a new life in the UK. | 23 min | 2023 |
| 15 | Twenty Minutes of Terror | A gunman kills five people within minutes. Could the shootings have been prevented? | 20 min | 2023 |
| 16 | Homegrown Terrorist | Could the Manchester Arena bombing have been stopped? | 24 min | 2023 |
| 17 | The Lie That Destroyed a Town | The story of false accusations by Ealeanor Williams about being the victim of a grooming gang. | 30 min | 2023 |
| 18 | Caught in the Crossfire | Nine-year-old Olivia Pratt-Korbel was killed when shots were fired into her family home. | 28 min | 2023 |
| 19 | 30 Years for Justice | Nikki Allan's murder shocked Sunderland. Why did it take so long to catch her killer? | 26 min | 2023 |
| 20 | The Sunshine Scammer | The bogus travel agent who conned hundreds of holidaymakers and her own family. | 28 min | 2023 |
| 21 | Killed on Christmas Eve | Elle Edwards was shot dead as she celebrated at Christmas in a murder that shocked the UK. | 32 min | 2023 |
| 22 | The Killing in the Lane | Lilia Valutyte died from a single stab wound in her chest. Who killed the nine-year-old? | 17 min | 2023 |
| 23 | Killed on Duty | The story of how a handcuffed prisoner shot dead Sgt Matt Ratana in 2020. | 21 min | 2023 |
| 24 | Unmasking a Fugitive | The story of Nicholas Rossi, the US fugitive who came to the UK with a new identity. | 30 min | 2023 |
| 25 | Deadly Influence | The story of a social media influencer, her mum and a murder plot. | 26 min | 2023 |
| 26 | The Missing Mum | Linda Razzell was murdered by her husband in 2002 - will he now reveal where her body is? | 22 min | 2023 |
| 27 | The Commons Criminal | The MP who rose from obscurity to being imprisoned for fraud. The story of Jared O'Mara. | 23 min | 2023 |
| 28 | Killed by My Boyfriend | The story of a young mum killed by her boyfriend of eight weeks. | 22 min | 2023 |
| 29 | The Doping Ward | The hospital unit where patients were drugged to keep them 'quiet and compliant'. | 26 min | 2023 |
| 30 | The Student Who Never Came Home | Kidnapped and murdered while on a gap year in France. Is it finally time for justice for Joanna Parrish? | 25 min | 2024 |
| 31 | Killed in the Park | Brianna Ghey was stabbed to death - two teenagers tried to get away with murder. | 26 min | 2024 |
| 32 | Held Captive and Left to Die | Shakira Spencer was tortured and starved by people she considered friends. | 23 min | 2024 |
| 33 | The Nottingham Attacks | In the summer of 2023, the lives of three families changed forever. | 29 min | 2024 |
| 34 | The Executioner Next Door | The true story of the Army's killer agent inside the IRA. | 25 min | 2024 |
| 35 | The Dance Floor Murder | The story of footballer Cody Fisher who was stabbed to death in a nightclub in Birmingham. | 26 min | 2024 |
| 36 | Killer in the Attic | When a man is stabbed to death outside a nightclub, armed police search for his killer. | 25 min | 2024 |
| 37 | The House Party Murder | How a house party turned into a murder scene - the fatal stabbing of Mikey Roynon. | 28 min | 2024 |
| 38 | Crushed: The Six Year Nightmare | Six years after surviving a horror smash, Monika died. It was time for justice, again. | 21 min | 2024 |
| 39 | The Abuser Headteacher | The story of a respected head, Neil Foden, who abused his power and became a convicted sex offender. | 29 min | 2024 |
| 40 | Trying to Kill Holly | The case of a plot to kidnap, rape, and murder TV presenter Holly Willoughby. | 16 min | 2024 |
| 41 | Stabbed After School | The shocking story of how a teenage relationship ended in murder. | 28 min | 2024 |
| 42 | Tortured Behind Closed Doors | The tragic story of Sara Sharif who was brutally killed by her father and stepmother. | 35 min | 2024 |
| 43 | My Husband the Monster | The story of Gisele Pelicot, raped by strangers her husband invited to abuse her. | 29 min | 2025 |
| 44 | The Mistaken Identity Murders | The story of two innocent teenagers murdered due to mistaken identity. | 30 min | 2025 |
| 45 | Neighbour, Friend, Killer | Wendy Buckney knew about her neighbour's past but wanted to give him a second chance. | 21 min | 2025 |
| 46 | The Bus Stop Murder | The tragic story of a schoolgirl, Elianne Andam, who was stabbed to death in a row about a teddy bear. | 27 min | 2025 |
| 47 | The Predator Who Fled to Paradise | The story of a predator who fled to paradise for almost three decades. | 25 min | 2025 |
| 48 | The Aristocrat, the Convict and the Missing Baby | An aristocrat and her convict partner went on the run with their newborn, ending in tragedy. | 29 min | 2025 |
| 49 | The Sycamore Gap - From Roots to Ruin | An ancient tree, symbolising a community, was chopped down overnight. Who did it and why? | 26 min | 2025 |
| 50 | Murdered by his Grandparents | The tragic case of two-year-old Ethan who was abused and killed by his grandparents. | 29 min | 2025 |
| 51 | The Bodies in the Suitcases | When two suitcases are abandoned by a man behaving strangely on a bridge in Bristol, the shocking contents lead police to a brutal double murder scene. | 29 min | 2025 |
| 52 | The Killer They Called Family | A young couple, killed on an ordinary morning by a man they welcomed into their home. This is the story of young parents Chloe and Josh Bashford. How did a family friendship go so wrong? | 30 min | 2025 |
| 53 | Bribes, Lies and the British Politician | Nathan Gill, a politician close to Nigel Farage, takes bribes in support of Russia. His texts reveal pro-Russian interference reaching right to the heart of Europe's democracy. | 29 min | 2025 |
| 54 | Liverpool Parade: Seven Minutes of Chaos | More than 130 people were injured when Paul Doyle drove his car through crowds celebrating Liverpool Football Club's Premiership win. This is how seven minutes of 'calculated violence' changed the lives of everyone that was there. | 24 min | 2025 |
| 55 | Undercover: Exposing a Terror Plot | In May 2024, Walid Saadaoui is stopped by police in a hotel car park in Bolton. Inside his car, are automatic guns and hundreds of bullets. Walid Saadaoui and his co-conspirators Amar Hussein and a man named Farouk intended to launch an antisemitic gun attack on Jewish people living in the UK. They planned to target a peaceful march, before taking their killing spree to an area of north Manchester packed with synagogues, schools, nurseries and care homes. In phone calls, Saadaoui said he was inspired by the extreme Islamist ideology of the so-called Islamic State group and that he wanted to kill Jewish men, women and even children. Police say it could potentially have been the deadliest-ever terror attack on UK soil. Except, there was a vital flaw in their plan: Farouk was an undercover police operative. And his team were tailing and filming the men every step of the way. We draw back the curtain on the covert police operation that led to Walid Saadaoui's arrest in a hotel car park, and hear from Jewish people living in the community who could have been targeted. In the wake of the Israel-Gaza conflict, antisemitic terror attacks have hit headlines around the world - including here in the UK. Jewish communities are building walls around their schools, community hubs and places of worship. But, one prominent member of the community in Manchester asks: is building the walls ever-higher the real answer? | 24 min | 2025 |

== See also ==
- Panorama
- Dispatches
- Ofcom
- Press freedom in the United Kingdom
