= Nikocado Avocado =

American internet celebrity (born 1992)

- Born: Nicholas Perry; May 19, 1992 (age 34); Kherson, Kherson Oblast, Ukraine
- Occupation: YouTuber
- Years active: 2014–present
- Spouse: Orlin Home (m. 2017)

YouTube information
- Channel: NikocadoAvocado
- Genre: Mukbang
- Subscribers: 4.71 million
- Views: 1.04 billion
- Last updated: April 23, 2026
- Website: nikocadoavocado.com

Nicholas Perry (born May 19, 1992), better known as Nikocado Avocado, is a Ukrainian-born American internet celebrity and YouTuber known for his mukbang videos. As of September 2024, he has accumulated more than 9.9 million subscribers and approximately 2.67 billion total views across six YouTube channels. His online persona is known for his comedic and theatrical performances, gaining excess weight on camera, and generating over 10 billion views on TikTok.

In September 2024, he said in a video that he had lost over 250 pounds (114 kg) of body weight over the course of two years, and that he had concealed this from his audience by continuing to upload videos that had been recorded before the weight loss. The video, entitled "Two Steps Ahead", garnered over 26 million views within 48 hours. It remains one of Perry's most successful, garnering more than 50 million views as of February 2025.

== Early life ==
Perry was born in Kherson on May 19, 1992, and was adopted in infancy by an American family who raised him in Pennsylvania. He majored in violin performance in college, attending the Catholic University of America's Benjamin T. Rome School of Music, Drama, and Art and performing at Carnegie Hall. Between 2011 and 2012, he made a living as a freelance violinist and a Home Depot worker, and moved to New York City in 2013 to pursue his dream of playing in a Broadway orchestra. However, he found it difficult to make a living in a city surrounded by other talented musicians.

== YouTube career ==
Perry's husband, who already had a YouTube channel of his own, first encouraged Perry to start one in 2014. His channel, named Nikocado Avocado, then consisted of vegan and lifestyle vlogs, as well as musical performances. On September 1, 2016, Perry released a video explaining why he no longer wanted to be a vegan YouTuber and his frustrations with the vegan community, which he described as "unbalanced, hostile, and mentally unstable". From 2016 onwards, Perry began filming mukbang videos, becoming one of the first American men to partake in the trend, with his first mukbang video reaching 50,000 views in a couple of weeks. His earlier mukbang videos showed his pet parrot sitting on his shoulder while he ate.

Perry appeared on Comedy Central's Tosh.0 in 2018. He also has a presence on platforms other than YouTube, such as Cameo, TikTok, Twitter, Facebook, Instagram, Patreon, and OnlyFans. He says he has had manic episodes due to his poor diet, and that he takes advantage of his low moments by using clickbait to encourage views to his videos.

In December 2019, Perry was accused by mukbanger Stephanie Soo of harassing her by sending her text messages and taking photos from inside her home. Perry published a response video disputing her statements, in which he displayed the photos he took and argued that Soo was fully aware of them being taken. He also showed their text conversations, stating that Soo had stood him up for a scheduled collaboration. Zach Choi, a fellow mukbanger who once joined Perry and Soo in a collaboration, later stated that he had hired an attorney to address Perry's statements, though no legal action ever took place. Perry later said that he and Soo had faked the feud to benefit their careers.

According to Perry's interview with MEL magazine in 2021, many of his online conflicts are self-orchestrated for the benefit of his career, citing his past education in performance arts and his desire to play the role of the villain. Perry told MEL during a conversation in which he also discussed his OnlyFans channel, "It's all completely scripted ... YouTube has been a way for me to create a character and provide entertainment."

=== Health concerns ===
Due to Perry's sharp weight gain in the late 2010s and early 2020s, many fans and YouTubers became concerned about his health. In a 2019 interview, Perry said he only planned on creating mukbang videos "for a couple more years" and that "it is very unhealthy". Numerous emotionally turbulent videos uploaded by Perry also led people to question the state of his mental health. In 2019, Perry told Men's Health that he suffered from erectile dysfunction and a loss of libido as a result of his binge eating. In 2021, he claimed that he had fractured his ribs after months of "excessive, forceful coughing". He also told his viewers that he had become classified as disabled and rode a mobility scooter.

=== Weight loss ===
In a video uploaded on May 10, 2024, Perry announced that he was giving up his weight loss effort, telling his viewers that he failed to lose a significant amount of weight within the past two years.

On September 6, 2024, Perry revealed that he had lost over 250 pounds (110 kg) in a video called "Two Steps Ahead", which gained over 26 million views in 48 hours. In the video, Perry revealed that he secretly lost the weight over the past two years and hid this fact by uploading pre-recorded content during that time, calling it the "greatest social experiment of [his] entire life". Perry opened the video wearing a giant panda mask, which he said symbolized the world of social media not being as black-and-white as it appears. He said, "While everybody pointed and laughed at me for over-consuming food, I was in total control the entire time. In reality, people are completely absorbed with internet personalities and obsessively watch their content. That is where a deeper level of over-consumption lies—and it's the parallel I wanted to make."

In January 2025, Perry revealed to People that he underwent a major facelift procedure to fix his "drooped neck". A month later, in February, Perry told NBC News that he underwent a series of invasive body lift procedures, in which he removed at least 10 pounds (4.5 kg) of excess skin from his body; for Perry, these operations felt like the conclusion of his weight loss process.

== Personal life ==
According to a 2016 video, Perry first met his husband Orlin Home through a vegan Facebook group. After months of online communication, Home traveled to the U.S. from his native country, Colombia, to meet Perry at the Woodstock Fruit Festival. They began a relationship after traveling together in Central America, and Perry abandoned his musical career in early 2014 to settle down with Home in Colombia. The two married on April 10, 2017. They reside in Las Vegas.
