= Kristina Carrillo-Bucaram =

American vegan activist (born 1987)

- Born: March 11, 1987 (age 39); United States
- Education: Vanderbilt University; Rice University
- Occupations: Writer; speaker; raw vegan activist
- Years active: 2007–present
- Notable work: The Fully Raw Diet: 21 Days to Better Health, with Meal and Exercise Plans, Tips, and 75 Recipes
- Movement: Raw veganism
- Website: www.fullyraw.com

Kristina Carrillo-Bucaram (FullyRawKristina) (born 11 March 1987) is an American writer, speaker, and raw vegan activist. She is the founder and creator of FullyRaw, the Rawfully Organic cooperative, FullyRaw Juice, and author of the book The FullyRaw Diet: 21 Days to Better Health. Her YouTube channel, where she discusses a variety of topics but mostly shares her raw vegan recipes, has more than 90 million views. She is based in Hawaii.

== Early life ==
Carrillo-Bucaram was raised in a multicultural household with a Lebanese mother and a Lebanese-Ecuadorian father. She says she was raised on traditional food and that has affected her health and later her activism. At the age of 16, she was diagnosed with hyperglycemia, meaning she had a high blood sugar condition, and the early stage of Type 2 diabetes. She claims that her hyperglycemia caused her to become emaciated, weighing in at only 87 pounds (39 kg) while standing 5 ft 7 in (1.70 m) tall.

Carrillo-Bucaram did her undergraduate studies at Vanderbilt University and later graduated from Rice University in 2009 with the summa cum laude distinction and was elected to Phi Beta Kappa for completing at least 90 semester hours in courses that reflect "learning for its own sake". She graduated with majors in kinesiology, health science, and vocal performance and briefly studied abroad in Costa Rica focusing on agriculture.

== Health journey and controversial claims ==
Carrillo-Bucaram met John Rose, a raw foods coach, at the age of 18 in a Whole Foods supermarket. He described raw veganism to her and this interaction inspired her to go raw vegan on July 15, 2005. She ate peaches for two weeks straight when she first went raw vegan.

She has made health-related claims such as that going raw will change your eye color, and has promoted the discredited practice of Iridology. When interviewed by Yahoo News, she said her eyes changed color because she claims eating a raw vegan diet "clears out all the gunk in your colon".

== Raw vegan movement and businesses ==
While attending university she started her own farmer's market on her campus. It was intended to be an alternative to expensive grocery stores and appeal to college students who may not be able to afford produce and other groceries otherwise. Running the campus farmer's market helped her cultivate a relationship with local farmers and produce distributors and led to her opening her own grocery cooperative called Rawfully Organic in September 2007.

=== Rawfully Organic ===
At its height, Rawfully Organic served 50,000 people at three different locations in the Houston area and was the largest organic produce cooperative in the United States. At the food co-op, people ordered their produce in advance then picked up their order after all of it has been assembled into boxes. Order pick-ups occurred at the Houston Arboretum and Nature Center on Tuesdays, at the Nottingham Forest Club on Thursdays, and at the Bissonett location on Saturdays. In 2014, a doctor in Houston, Dr. Garth Davis, started prescribing his patients "raw fruits and vegetables." Davis received a grant from the Memorial Hermann Health System and partnered with Carrillo-Bucaram. His patients would pick up their prescription from the Rawfully Organic co-op instead of a pharmacy each week and paid very little for the produce by showing their prescription to the co-op. In 2016, CBS named Rawfully Organic as one of the top spots to get produce. After almost 11 years of operation, the Rawfully Organic co-op closed its doors in 2017.

After four years of being closed, Rawfully Organic reopened temporarily in April 2020 to help get produce to people who didn't feel safe going to grocery stores during the COVID-19 pandemic. Reopening was also an attempt to revitalize the Houston Farmer's Market that had been failing for some time. However, Carrillo-Bucaram doesn't see Rawfully Organic staying open after the pandemic because there's too much competition from major grocers like Whole Foods.

=== FullyRaw Juice ===
This is a sister company to Rawfully Organic that sells fully raw juices. She founded it in 2013 using a Kickstarter campaign to help cover the cost of the start up. She raised $35,000. She sells cold-pressed fruits and vegetables.

=== FullyRaw website ===
FullyRaw is a website she founded to coach people on how to start and maintain a raw vegan diet. She provides webinars, programs, and in person health coaching. She has done several "challenges" for a period of time where she offers meal plans, workouts, and advice through her website if you pay to join the "challenge."

=== Book ===
On January 5, 2016, Carrillo-Bucaram wrote and published a book entitled The Fully Raw Diet: 21 Days to Better Health, with Meal and Exercise Plans, Tips, and 75 Recipes. As the title suggests, the book contains meal plans, workouts, and recipes but it also contains the story of her health journey. The book became a number one seller on Amazon.

=== YouTube ===
Carrillo-Bucaram has gained much of her recognition from her growing YouTube channels and other social media. She has one million followers on Instagram and has gained more than 90 million views across her YouTube channels.

=== Speaking engagements ===
Carrillo-Bucaram has hosted and given speeches at the "Woodstock Fruit Festival" for many years on and off since 2010. She also has given talks at the annual "Texas Veggie Fair" for several years since 2013.
