= Songs of Praise =

British religious TV series (1961–)

- Genre: Religious broadcasting
- Created by: Donald Baverstock
- Presented by: Aled Jones; Katherine Jenkins; Sean Fletcher; Pam Rhodes; Claire McCollum; Kate Bottley (See full list)
- Theme music composer: Herbert Chappell (1980–1986); Robert Prizeman (1986–2021)
- Ending theme: Songs of Praise – Toccata for Organ
- Country of origin: United Kingdom
- Original language: English
- No. of episodes: 3105 (approx) (Jan 2024)

Production
- Executive producer: Barry Hart
- Producers: David Waters; Charlotte Hindle; Karen Hannah
- Running time: 35 minutes
- Production companies: BBC Television (in-house) (1961–2016); BBC Studios (2016–2017); Nine Lives Media (2017–2023); Avanti Media (2017–2023); CTVC (2023-)

Original release
- Network: BBC One
- Release: 1 October 1961 – present

Related
- Your Songs of Praise Choice; Praise Be!

Songs of Praise is a BBC Television religious reality programme that presents Christian hymns, worship songs and inspirational performances in churches of varying denominations from around the UK alongside interviews and stories reflecting how Christian faith is lived out.

The series was first broadcast in October 1961 as the English-language version of Welsh programme Dechrau Canu Dechrau Canmol. On that occasion, the venue was the Tabernacle Baptist Church in Cardiff. It is believed to be the longest running series of its genre on television anywhere in the world.

== Format ==
Until a change of format in November 2014, the programme featured congregations from churches and cathedrals singing hymns alongside interviews with people from the church from which the programme was broadcast with an exploration by the presenter of that week's theme, all from the same location.

November 2014 saw the programme adopt more of a magazine format. The stated intention was to evolve the series to reflect the wider Christian audience across the country. Music remains at the heart of the series, but is now more varied in style, reflecting the broad range of Christian genres in each programme and across the series; there is no longer a single location where the music and stories come from each week. The series continued to be usually broadcast between 4 and 5pm on Sundays; though as of 2018 onwards, it has generally been broadcast in a lunchtime slot. The new format continues with special programmes marking Easter and Remembrance Sunday as well as the popular two Big Sing programmes from the Royal Albert Hall and the School Choir of the Year contest. The more recent Gospel Choir of the Year began recording in Birmingham Town Hall in 2013 and in 2014 was recorded at The Hackney Empire in London.

The show has included interviews with Tony Blair, Frances Shand Kydd, Alan Ayckbourn and members of the British royal family.

== Scheduling ==
Until the relaxation of broadcasting hours restrictions in the autumn of 1972, it was regulated by the government under the control of the Postmaster General that all television broadcasting on Sunday evenings from 6:15 pm–7:25 pm should be "closed" and used only for religious programming on both BBC and ITV. Until 1958, no programmes were broadcast during this time slot, as many people attended church services in the evening. A compromise was reached between the churches and the Postmaster General, where religious programming would be acceptable to air in this time slot provided there was no advertising. It was under these restrictions and regulations that Songs of Praise was created.

At its inception in October 1961, the programme was broadcast at 6:15 pm. From September 1962, it moved to 6:50 pm and then to 6:40 pm from April 1977 with a daytime repeat, generally shown on the following day with BSL. Religious programming was also broadcast on ITV in the same time slot, but this custom ended in late December 1992. From January 1993, the programme's scheduled broadcast time was changed to 6:25 pm and then 6:10 pm from January 1996. Since then, the time of broadcast has tended to shift slightly earlier, but the precise slot has often varied from week to week. As of January 2021, the programme has now been placed in a new permanent lunchtime slot on a Sunday, after the Sunday lunchtime news, usually scheduled at 1.15pm.

=== Summer replacements ===
For many years, the series was replaced during the summer months by other Christian-themed programming. From 1977 until 1993, a selection of hymns from the previous year's shows, linked by Thora Hird reading requests and dedications, was featured in Your Songs of Praise Choice, which changed its name to Praise Be! in 1984. Other summer replacements included Home on Sunday (1980–88) and Sweet Inspiration (1993–94).

== Events ==
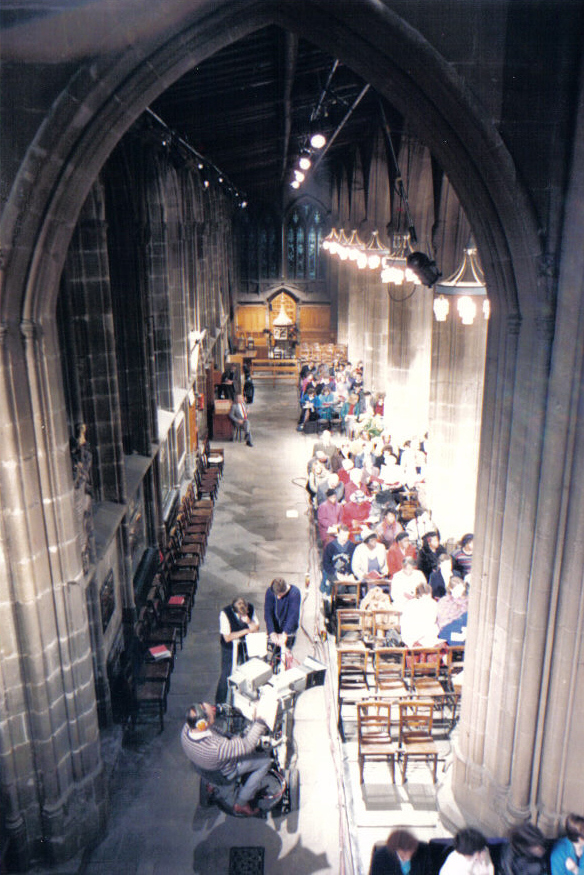
Recording Songs of Praise at St. Mary's Church, Nottingham in 1988

Events have included a 3 October 1982 broadcast from Strangeways Prison, a 2 January 1983 broadcast from the Falkland Islands and a broadcast from St. Patrick's Cathedral in New York.

A competition was held in honour of the 20th anniversary in which people submitted newly written hymns. Fifteen winners were published in a book New Songs of Praise I.

The programme staged its largest event at the Millennium Stadium in Cardiff on the first Sunday of 2000. A live audience of over 60,000 people came to sing hymns, with a 6,000 piece choir, an orchestra of 100 harps, the band of the Welsh Guards and an anthem specially written by Lord Andrew Lloyd Webber. The programme was produced by John Forrest. Ian Bradley said the event had a "wonderful vulgarity" but that it also had an "infectious sense of community"

Each year since 2003, three consecutive weeks of the programme (usually in April) have been devoted to the School Choir of the Year competition – the first two weeks being semi-finals featuring junior and senior school choirs respectively, with the final of both categories in the third week.

In order to cut costs, the Easter 2007 edition of the show was recorded at the same time as the Christmas 2006 edition of the show at Lichfield Cathedral in Staffordshire – with simple changes in lighting and flowers to reflect the two major services. The Bishop of Lichfield Jonathan Gledhill, said the early recording was not a "deliberate deceit" but would give "an air of unreality" to the Easter programme, while a BBC spokeswoman said it was "common practice" to film two shows at once due to the costs in setting up lighting rigs, especially in a large cathedral.

The 16 August 2015 broadcast, filmed at an Ethiopian Orthodox church in the Calais jungle, received criticism from the media including the Daily Express, who stated the BBC was "out of touch" and that the show had "political propaganda". In response, the Anglican Bishop of Leeds Nick Baines and Archbishop of Canterbury Justin Welby defended the BBC's decision as reflecting the Church's teachings on poverty. Meanwhile, the Reverend Steve Chalke, former Songs of Praise presenter and well-known Christian social activist, wrote:

The programme's producers have been lambasted on social media as well as by sections of the press and a handful of politicians for 'wasting taxpayer's money' and, for that greatest of all religious sins, of 'becoming political'. In my view, however, tackling this complex humanitarian issue is exactly what Songs of Praise should be doing. The role of the television show, which is essentially about Christian faith, means the only way in which it can authentically fulfil its mandate is to deal with the tough issues of life, alongside the joys, faced by individuals as well as whole communities. Back in the '90s I was a presenter for Songs of Praise. Amongst the shows that I remain most proud of were those we made in South Africa, soon after Nelson Mandela was elected president, about the struggle against Apartheid, and another special programme I co-presented with Sally Magnusson the weekend after the Dunblane school massacre.

== Reception and impact ==
In the early 1990s, the weekly reach of the show was about 25% of the British population. In 1998, the average viewership was between 5 and 6 million. Because of the long-time transmission of Songs of Praise following the Sunday evening news, the time slot has become known as the "God slot". The show has been accused of "abandon[ing] its long-standing commitment to straightforward hymns and 'ordinary' people talking about their often very extraordinary lives and faith and becoming increasingly obsessed with celebrities and soft-focus schmaltz".

The show is featured in episodes from three BBC comedy television series: The Vicar of Dibley, The Brittas Empire and Mandy.

The show is also broadcast in Australia on the ABC at 11:30am on Sundays, and in the Netherlands on NPO 2 at 12pm, also on Sundays.

== Competitive tender ==
In 2016, as part of their new charter agreement, the BBC announced that they would put all their programmes which were due for recommission out to competitive tender over an 11-year period, with independent companies invited to bid to make the shows, although the BBC would retain all interstitial property rights. A Question of Sport was the first programme to go through this process with BBC Studios winning the commission and retaining the rights to make the show in house. Songs of Praise followed shortly after but on 10 March 2017 it was announced that the tender had been won by two independent production companies: Avanti Media based in Cardiff and Nine Lives Media located in Manchester who would be producing the show for the next three years as a co-production. Avanti Media also produced its Welsh-language originator Dechrau Canu, Dechrau Canmol from 2006 until 2017 when its production tender was won by Rondo Media (a company which also produces Welsh soap opera Rownd a Rownd).

In May 2022, Avanti and Nine Lives announced they would not renew their tender deal to produce the series, with the BBC announcing that they would look for a new company to produce the show beginning in June 2023. On 31 March 2023, CTVC were announced as the winners.

== Presenters and contributors ==
Presenters of the show have included Kwame Kwei-Armah, Geoffrey Wheeler, Michael Barratt, Cliff Michelmore, Sir Harry Secombe, Alan Titchmarsh, Roger Royle, Debbie Thrower, Bruce Parker, Ian Gall, Martin Bashir, Huw Edwards, Eamonn Holmes, Kenneth Kendall, Josie d'Arby, Jonathan Edwards, Steve Chalke, David Grant, Bill Turnbull, Sally Magnusson, Diane-Louise Jordan, Connie Fisher and Dan Walker.

Guest presenters have included Sir Cliff Richard, Gavin Peacock, Michael Buerk, Pete Waterman, Ann Widdecombe and Caron Keating. Jonathan Edwards' departure from the programme in 2007 was notable after he publicly renounced his Christian faith.

As of 2026, the main presenters are Aled Jones, Kate Bottley, Sean Fletcher, Claire McCollum, Laura Wright, Pam Rhodes and Mark De-Lisser

== See also ==
- Be Still for the Presence of the Lord
- Choral Evensong
- Dechrau Canu, Dechrau Canmol
- Religion in the United Kingdom
- The Sunday Hour
