= Death of Sania Khan =

2022 murder of Pakistani American woman

Sania Khan (1993 – July 18, 2022) was a Pakistani American woman who was murdered by her estranged husband, Raheel Ahmad, in Chicago after she shared her divorce experience on TikTok. After killing Khan, Ahmad shot himself when police arrived on the scene and later died from his injuries. Her popularity on social media and the high profile murder put a spotlight on domestic violence and stigmatization of divorce in Pakistani Muslim immigrant communities around the world.

== Background ==
Khan was born in 1993 and was a first-generation child of Pakistani Muslim immigrants. Khan was born to Haider Farooq Khan and Shazia Khan. Her hometown was Chattanooga, Tennessee where she graduated from the Chattanooga School for the Arts & Sciences. She went on to graduate from the University of Tennessee-Chattanooga where she double majored in psychology and women's studies.

She married Raheel Ahmad in June 2021 after about five years of dating. Khan worked as a photographer and moved to Chicago with her husband after their wedding. Khan's friends said that she changed after marrying Ahmad and that he would have mental breakdowns and threatened to kill himself. In December 2021, Khan filed for divorce. Ahmad moved to Alpharetta, Georgia, while Khan remained in Chicago. The final divorce hearing was supposed to be in August 2022.

Khan shared her experience filing for divorce through TikTok videos. Though she was originally hesitant to share the details, she felt she "owed it" to herself and other women of color in similar situations. She also discussed how divorce and domestic violence are taboo topics in the South Asian community and how she had pushback from her some of her own family about her decisions. At the time of her death, Khan had more than 20,000 followers of her TikTok account.

== Death ==
One of Ahmad's relatives reported him missing to the Alpharetta Police, who then contacted the Chicago police to do a welfare check. Ahmad had traveled from Alpharetta to Khan's Chicago residence where he shot Khan in the back of the head. Ahmad was discovered by police with a 9mm Glock handgun, a suicide note, and a head wound. Ahmad was taken to Northwestern Hospital where he was later pronounced dead. Before she was killed, Khan was in the process of moving back to Chattanooga.

Khan's funeral was on July 28, 2022. The costs for her funeral were raised through a GoFundMe campaign which raised over $36,000, well over the required cost. The remaining funds were originally intended to be donated to Sakhi for South Asian Women and the Peaceful Families Project, two South Asian anti-domestic violence organizations, though ultimately the campaign organizer decided to return the funds due to conflict with Khan's family members.

== Legacy ==
On July 24, 2022, a candlelight vigil was held in Khan's honor at the Chattanooga School for the Arts & Sciences. Friends of Khan, Cora-Leigh O'Neal and James Cummins, started a scholarship fund in her honor as The Sania Khan Memorial Scholarship Fund for female students with a GPA of at least 3.5 graduating from the Chattanooga School for Arts & Sciences and who intend to pursue a degree in fine arts at the University of Tennessee-Chattanooga.

Khan's death sparked an international conversation amongst South Asian social media communities regarding gender-based domestic violence within family and culture. Pakistani actresses Ayesha Omar and Dur-e-Fishan Saleem were some of the notable mourners. Many South Asian women used the conversation to share their own stories with domestic violence and cultural shame. Others used the tragedy to offer insight into the dynamics of shame and divorce in South Asian culture while offering resources for victims.

On October 3, 2022, Khan's family filed a wrongful death lawsuit against her daughter's apartment building, alleging that the building allowed Ahmad into the apartment despite him being banned for being a known serious threat.

The case was the subject of Episode 2 of the documentary series TikTok: Murder Gone Viral.

== See also ==
- List of homicides in Illinois
- Honor killing in the United States
- Sandeela Kanwal
- Murder of Aqsa Parvez
- Sakhi for South Asian Women
