= Cat Lewis =

British TV executive producer (born 1965)

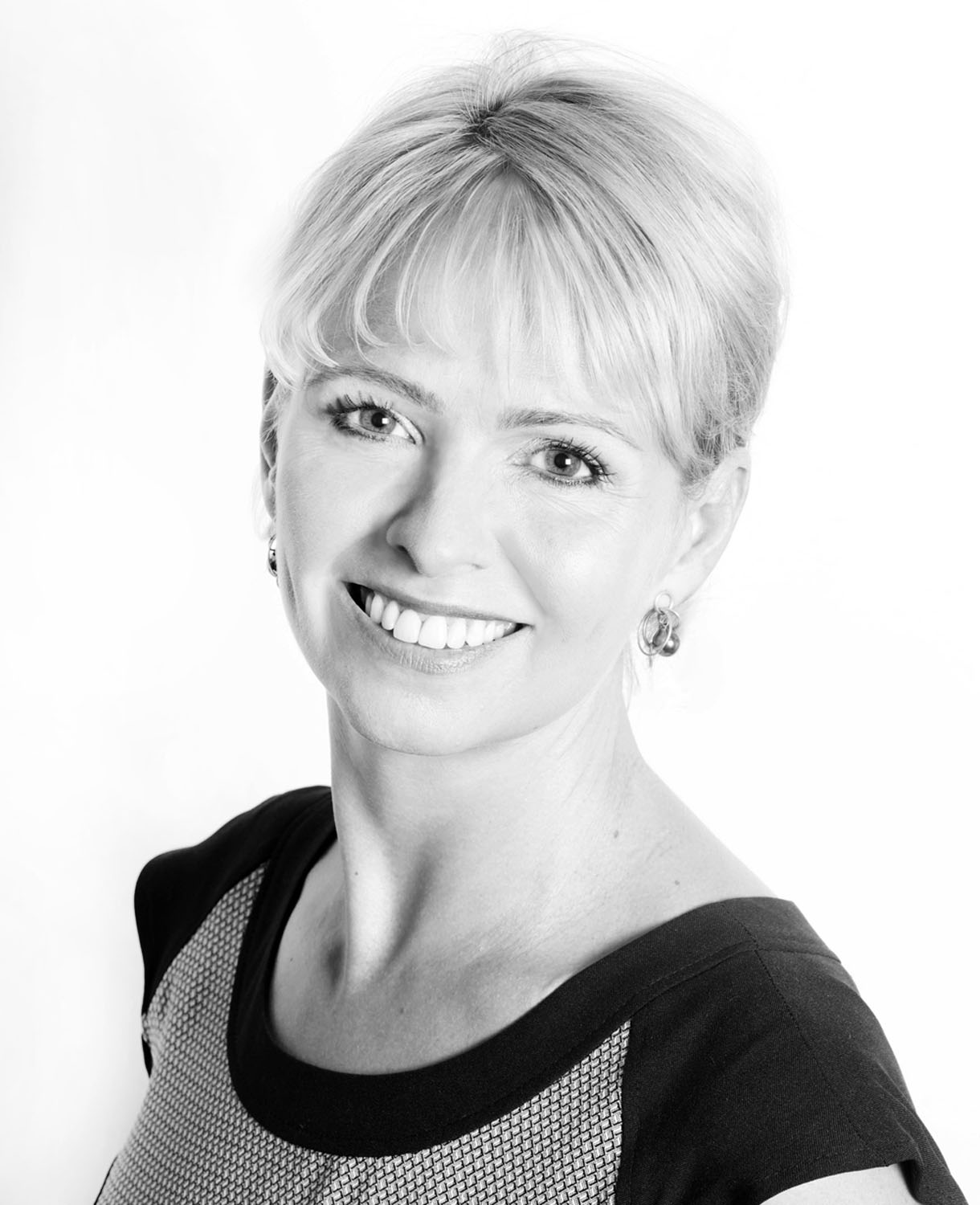
- Born: Catriona Margaret Pettigrew; 23 March 1965 (age 61); Rajkot, India
- Occupations: CEO, Joint Creative Director and Executive Producer, Nine Lives Media
- Spouse: Mike Lewis
- Children: Tom Lewis, Joe Lewis

Cat Lewis (born 23 March 1965) is a British TV executive producer and the founder and CEO of Nine Lives Media.

== Early life and background ==
Lewis was born Catriona Margaret Pettigrew on 23 March 1965 in Rajkot, India. Her family returned to live in England when she was 3 years old, and her school years were spent in Stockton-on-Tees, where she attended Ian Ramsay C. of E. School and Stockton Sixth Form. Her father is mountaineer Bob Pettigrew, and her mother, Deana Addison, was Head of Religious Education at The Norton School in Stockton-on-Tees. They separated upon their return from India. Her mother married Lewis's stepfather, Terence Michael Addison, who worked as an engineer and consultant to the steel industry.

Lewis' great-grandfather, Guy Pettigrew, was a music hall performer who began making films during the era of silent movies in 1919.

== Early career ==
Lewis co-presented a children's radio programme called Hubble Bubble on Radio Tees (now called TFM Radio) from the age of 15 to 18. In 1981, she presented the first Sunday morning children's programme called Sunday Sundae, which has been archived by the British Film Institute.

In 1983, Lewis enrolled at Bristol University to read English & Drama. After graduating in 1986 she spent a year shooting and editing educational films before completing a Post-Grad Diploma in Broadcast Journalism at the University of Central Lancashire.

In 1988, Lewis won a place as a BBC Production Trainee, based in the North West. After working on a range of BBC productions as a Researcher, she moved across to Granada as an Assistant Producer and was promoted to Series Producer at the age of 26. She went on to work on a range of factual programmes for Granada Television including This Morning, World in Action, and the first property makeover series – House Style.

In 1995, Lewis went back on screen as a reporter for a programme about the internet presented by Tony Wilson, and then she worked for three years as a BBC news reporter for North West Tonight. In the 1990s, she also set up Granada Television's programme-related websites. She organised the first live internet vote on TV in 1998 on the Stars in Their Eyes’ final. In 1998, Lewis began working as a documentary Producer/Director for Granada Television making films for Sky One, ITV, Channel 4 and Channel 5. In 1999 she won her first two TV commissions for Channel Five and Channel 4.

In 2001, Lewis left Granada Television to set up the factual division of Unique Television. By 2006, she had created six new TV series plus a large number of one-off films, building Unique Factuals' annual turnover to £1.8 million.

== Current career ==
On 3 September 2007, Lewis launched the Manchester-based independent production company, Nine Lives Media. She is the owner, CEO, and executive producer of the company, which has become a large factual independent producer in the North West of England. Her husband, Mike Lewis, joined the business in 2011 and is co-creative director. The company makes documentaries, fact-ent formats, drama documentaries, children's programmes, and current affairs for all the major UK broadcasters and for American channels.

== Awards ==
- International Emmy for Best Factual Children's Programme 2016, I am Leo, for CBBC.
- Royal Television Society Award for Best Children's Programme 2016, I am Leo, for CBBC.
- BAFTA 2015, Best Factual Children's Programme, I am Leo, for CBBC.
- BAFTA 2012, Best Factual Children's Programme, Me, My Dad & His Kidney, for CBBC.
- Royal Television Society (North West) Awards 2012, Best Low Budget Programme, I Survived 9/11, for BIO.
- IVCA Clarion Awards 2012, Ruby Wax's Mad Confessions, for Channel 4.
- Inspiring Women North West 2012, Shortlisted in Creative & Media, Cat Lewis
- How do Awards 2011, Independent Production Company of the Year, Nine Lives Media
- Royal Television Society (North West) Awards 2011, Best Factual Series, Small Teen Bigger World, for BBC Three.
- Royal Television Society (North West) Awards 2010, Best Low Budget Programme, A Tale of Two Rival Cities, for BBC's History of the World.
- Royal Television Society (North West) Awards 2010, Best Single Documentary, Small Teen, Big World, for BBC Three.
- North West Women in Business 2010, Finalist, Cat Lewis
- How do Awards 2009, Best TV Programme, The World's Oldest Conjoined Twins, for Channel 5.
- Royal Television Society (North West) Awards 2007, Best Single Documentary, Cutting Edge: The Dangerous School for Boys, for Channel 4.
- Royal Television Society 1993, Best Daytime Programme
- Cat's Radio Tees programme Hubble Bubble won two Sony Awards in 1982 and 1983

== Television industry roles ==
Lewis is on the UK Advisory Panel of the Creative Industries Foundation. She is chair of the Northern TV Skills Panel and former Vice Chair of Pact (the Producers Alliance for Cinema & TV). For six years Cat was the Chair of PACT's Nations & Regions Committee, campaigning for more programmes to be made outside London. She is a BAFTA judge; the founder and chair of the North's Indie Club; sits on the RTS Committee in the North West and is on the panel for Women in Film & TV in the North. Cat is also a Global Ambassador for the UK city of Manchester.

== Personal life ==
Lewis is married to TV executive producer Mike Lewis, who specialises in current affairs, and they have two sons. Cat is a Christian, who attends a United Reformed Church, and she has ten godchildren.
