= Stephanie Soo =

American entertainer (born 1995)

- Born: Yoon Soojin; November 27, 1994 (age 31)
- Occupations: Podcaster; YouTuber
- Years active: 2017–present

YouTube information
- Channel: Stephanie Soo
- Genre: True crime
- Subscribers: 5.19 million
- Views: 670 million
- Last updated: October 22, 2026
- Website: www.rottenmangopodcast.com

Yoon Soojin (Korean: 윤수진; born November 27, 1994), better known as Stephanie Soo, is an American podcaster and YouTuber known for her mukbang videos and true crime storytelling.

She hosts podcasts including Rotten Mango, where she presents true crime narration; Rotten Files and Moral of the Story. On YouTube, she has three channels: Stephanie Soo, Miss Mango Butt and Rotten Mango.

== Motivations ==
Stephanie Soo said that she began watching mukbang videos on YouTube while taking time off from her job in retail. She later decided to make one herself, and her first video showed her eating a frozen burrito from Whole Foods. According to Soo, it had about 42 views the day after she posted it.

== YouTube career ==
In 2017, Soo began uploading videos that often combined mukbangs with true crime stories.

In December 2019, Nicholas Perry also known as Nikocado Avocado, uploaded a collaboration video with Soo and Zach Choi. Soo later uploaded a video titled "Why I Am Scared of Nikocado Avocado" in which she said she had felt unsafe around Perry, and allegedly said he had sent her text messages and taken photos from inside her home. Perry responded in his own videos claiming Soo was aware of the photos being taken. Each side shared their perspectives and clips to support their version of events. Perry later claimed that the stunt was planned to garner publicity.

In 2020, Soo launched the Rotten Mango channel and podcast.

In March 2024, Soo's podcast Rotten Mango received the Innovator Award, presented by YouTube, at the iHeartPodcast Awards.

In May 2025, Rotten Mango reached the number one spot on YouTube's weekly podcast chart, surpassing The Joe Rogan Experience after Soo's coverage of the trial of Sean Combs.

In April 2026, Netflix announced that The Rotten Files would be added to their list of podcasts.

== Personal Life ==
Soo married her husband, who is also known as MisterMangoButt, in 2023 in Switzerland.

== Podcasts ==
Rotten Mango: In 2020, Soo launched a podcast called Rotten Mango in which she discusses various true crime cases including lesser known international ones. She focuses on storytelling, blending both empathy and humor with serious topics.

The Rotten Files: In April 2026, Netflix announced Soo’s new podcast called The Rotten Files in which she discusses current criminal cases.

Moral of the Story: Soo also hosts a podcast Moral of the Story in which she discusses scandals and internet controversies.
