= Dechrau Canu, Dechrau Canmol =

British TV religious series (since 1961)

- English: Start Singing, Start Praising
- Genre: Religious broadcasting
- Presented by: Current (2018–): Nia Roberts Lisa Gwilym; Nigel Owens; Ryland Teifi
- Theme music composer: Christopher Tin; Tudur Dylan Jones
- Country of origin: Wales
- Original language: Welsh

Production
- Executive producer: Marc Edwards
- Producer: Aled John
- Running time: 30 minutes (inc. adverts)
- Production companies: BBC Cymru Wales (1961–1993); Intrada (1993–1998); Teledu Elidir (1998–2006); Avanti Media (2006–2017); Rondo Media (2017–)

Original release
- Network: BBC One Wales
- Release: 1 January 1961 – 1982
- Network: S4C
- Release: 1982 – present

Related
- Songs of Praise

Dechrau Canu, Dechrau Canmol (Welsh for 'Start Singing, Start Praising') is a television series featuring congregational Christian singing in the Welsh language. Currently broadcast by the Welsh-language television channel S4C, it is one of the longest-running television programmes on any British television channel, the first edition having been broadcast by the BBC from Trinity Chapel, Swansea, on 1 January 1961. The programme inspired the creation of the similar English-language series Songs of Praise, which began later in the same year.

The programmes celebrate important festivals and dates in the Christian calendar and place on film the celebration of important national and international occasions where the music is of a devotional and religious nature.

== Production ==
The programme was produced in-house by BBC Cymru Wales until 1993 when production was awarded to independent company Intrada. In 1998 Teledu Elidir took over production and Avanti Media was awarded the contract in 2006. The production was re-tendered in 2017 and it was awarded to Rondo Media (known from producing soap opera Rownd a Rownd).
