= Claire McCollum =

British journalist and broadcaster

Claire McCollum (born 5 June 1974, Carrickfergus) is a Northern Irish broadcaster and journalist.

== Broadcasting career ==
McCollum, an MA graduate at the University of Dundee, began her career in broadcasting with Macmillan Media in 1997. She also worked as a researcher for CNN and as a newsreader on Downtown Radio.

McCollum joined UTV in March 2000. As well as presenting and reporting for UTV Sport, she has also presented UTV News bulletins and Sport on Sunday.

In February 2009, McCollum announced she was leaving UTV as part of a voluntary redundancy scheme at the station. In an interview with a regional newspaper, McCollum announced her intention to become a freelance broadcast journalist.

Since 2009, Claire has built up her portfolio with BBC Northern Ireland. She has become synonymous with many of Northern Ireland television's highest profile events. She co-hosted BBC Proms in the Park at Titanic Slipways, the Olympic Flame arriving at Belfast City Hall and the Clipper Homecoming in Derry. In 2014 she joined the BBC Songs of Praise.

Claire also presented and reported on two series of the popular BBC NI consumer programme In Your Corner and has covered many major sporting events including the North West 200, Commonwealth Games in Manchester, Northern Ireland's Football World Cup qualifiers, Tennis Legends in Belfast and the Belfast International Horse Show. She is also a regular presenter on Balmoral Agricultural Show and Children in Need programmes and hosted the second glittering 'Celebrity Strictly Come Dancing' extravaganza for Children in Need.

In 2019 she appeared on an episode of Celebrity Mastermind.

== Personal life ==
McCollum is married to Alastair and they have a son (born c. 2007) and daughter (born c. 2009). She resides in her hometown of Newtownabbey, Co. Antrim. She is a Christian.

She is also a supporter of Parkinson's UK, resulting from her father's diagnosis.
