= Clean Plate campaign =

Anti–food waste campaign in China

The Clean Plate campaign is a movement initiated in 2013 to reduce food waste and ensure food security in China. While the initial campaign originated from grass-roots society, it soon received government encouragement and support. Aligned with General Secretary of the Chinese Communist Party Xi Jinping's anti-corruption campaign and goal to instill more discipline among party members, there were government instructions and demands to limit the government spending on social banquets, which was a big contributor of food waste. However, other than that measure, the government mostly stayed out of the private realm with no central regulations on private practices of food waste. There was some local effort, but most of it died out soon.

On 13 January 2013, a public charity organization in Beijing launched an anti-food-waste campaign which they later referred to as the "Clean Plate" campaign. Initially distributing posters and flyers in restaurants and gas stations, the campaigners quickly drew the attention of state media, which covered the event on social media, making the campaign widely recognized and followed across China in ten days. Many saw the event as an example of the spread of public opinions and campaigns on social media in China, contemporary with the rise of internet media and smartphones. Some viewed the official endorsement of the campaign as not only targeting food waste in China, but also in line with Communist Party chief Xi Jinping's anti-corruption campaign, which urged cadres and government officials to stop lavish lifestyles.

In 2017, it was found that food waste had almost returned to the levels they were at before the campaign started, showing the limited impact of the Clean Plate campaign in 2013, which was mostly led by individual actions. Starting then, new incidents of serious food waste in China have caught public attention, like the bad social influence of food waste from "eating livestreams" and the incident of fans dumping tons of dairy drink for the QR code within the lid to support their idols in a talent selection show Youth with You 3. This prompted further government responses.

On 11 August 2020, Chinese leader Xi Jinping announced a second Clean Plate campaign and urged the public to reduce food waste, especially amid the COVID-19 pandemic, to ensure the food security for the mass population. Most recently, on 29 April 2021, the Anti-food Waste Law was passed through the Standing Committee of the Thirteenth National People's Congress.

== Background ==
=== Food waste in China ===
The 2018 WWF report on food waste in Chinese cities shows that a total of 17–18 million tons of food are wasted annually in Chinese cities. On average, each citizen wastes 93 grams of food per meal in the cities surveyed (Beijing, Shanghai, Chengdu and Lhasa), in which vegetables and staple foods constitute the majority of the waste. The quantity of food waste is found to be associated with a variety of factors: restaurant size, purpose of the meal, etc. On average, tourists waste more food than local citizens; larger restaurants have more serious food waste than smaller ones; and friend-gathering and business-purposed meals contribute to higher food waste. The study also found the food waste in primary and secondary schools to be above average, potentially due to low satisfaction with the quality of school dining.

Consumer food waste in China constitutes a significant portion in the country's total food waste. An estimated 50 Mt of grain in China is annually wasted at the consumer stage, compared to 35 Mt at pre-consumer stages. 90% of consumer-stage food waste happens in mid- to high-end restaurants and canteens in China, whereas in western countries such as the European Union, household food waste plays the biggest role (42%, 38 Mt), and the food service sector trails behind at 14%. Alternative sources estimate the annual consumer food waste in China to be about 17–18 Mt in 2015, equivalent to the annual consumption of 30–50 million people.

=== Consumer culture and behavior ===
In special occasion dinners, consumer culture plays a large role in producing more food waste. As a matter of etiquette, consumers tend to order more than they can consume. The abundance of beverages in these dinners also reduces food intake, increasing the quantity of food waste. In China, the use of a "doggy bag" is not only traditionally frowned upon as a sign of poor financial status, but also economically discouraged as most restaurants charge the customers for the doggy bags. This factor is found to reduce consumers' willingness of packing leftover food, along with the poor environmental soundness of the doggy bags themselves.

Consumer dietary knowledge and preferences also contribute significantly to food waste. Risk-averse consumers consciously throw away seemingly fresh food earlier, and urban consumers with access to more various and well-processed food options waste less than rural consumers in household food production. In China, researchers found a relation between dietary knowledge and household food waste. Rural and low-income consumer's dietary knowledge is found to increases the quantity of food waste more substantially than that of the urban consumers. Conversely, more dietary knowledge in high-income households and communities with higher development index decreases the quantity of food waste, presumably through education on dietary knowledge.

=== Climate change and food security ===
The climate crisis profoundly challenges the world's food supply, particularly in less-developed regions. Climate change affects the environmental conditions for agricultural production by raising average temperatures, altering precipitation patterns, and inducing more extreme climate events. This is an accelerating process as the climate crisis continues to unfold in the near future, threatening global crop production and putting an additional 1–183 million people in food insecurity. The Intergovernmental Panel on Climate Change (IPCC) identifies low-income consumers to be the most affected, especially women, who have been more involved in the food source of households.

Decreasing food loss and waste could help with both emission reduction and food security. The IPCC estimates that 25–30% of food is wasted in production and consumption globally, which, during 2010–2016, equates to 8–10% of total anthropogenic greenhouse gas (GHG) emissions. Therefore, managing food waste becomes a significant mitigation measure in the agriculture sector.

In 2020, Chinese food security is under pressure due to the joint effect of long-term factors such as climate anomalies and decrease of rural labor, as well as short-term emergencies such as the COVID-19 pandemic and African swine fever. A rare typhoon struck the country's main corn production area in the northeast before the autumn harvest, resulting in a production decrease and price surge of the main source of grain in China, alongside summer floods earlier in the year. On the meat market, the 2019–2020 African swine fever outbreak had already increased the price of pork, the most consumed meat in China, by 135.2% in February, only to drop in October after 19 months of increase. The COVID-19 pandemic forced many countries to tighten export control of grains, decreasing China's crop import and putting pressure on the country's ability to self-sustain. The pressing situation is cited by CCP general secretary Xi Jinping and official Chinese media, as well as other press sources, as a motivation for the second round of the Clean Plate campaign in 2020.

== History ==
=== 2013 ===
The Clean Plate campaign is a movement initiated in January 2013 by a public-spirited group IN_33 with members from various industries. IN_33 advocated eating up everything from one's plate, aiming to reduce food waste and ensure food security in China. This group handed out flyers and posters in Beijing and reached out to many restaurants to help them advertise the concept of "clean plate". It also used online platforms to encourage people not to waste food. Their posting of pictures of clean plates at meals launched a trend for lots of netizens to follow. On Weibo, the social media platform of the original post, there were over 50 million retweets within days.

Soon, this campaign became widely known and reached the government. Starting on 23 January, one of the largest news industry in China People's Daily published several favorable editorials on the Clean Plate campaign and encouraged more people to follow its cause. Because People's Daily is an official newspaper of the Central Committee of the Chinese Communist Party, it is known for being the direct channel voicing the Chinese Communist Party's policy platforms and viewpoints. On 28 January, Chinese leader Xi Jinping gave instructions on food waste in a report from Xinhua News Agency, which is the official state-run press agency of the People's Republic of China. He stated that the food waste in China is astonishing, and considering some Chinese people still live under the poverty line, it was necessary to strike down waste and restore the frugal tradition of the Chinese civilization. He also urged the relevant authorities to take action, and public officials to be the model for reducing waste.

Along with the Eight-point Regulation stipulated in December 2012, which also included clauses of limiting the resources and consumption for government officials using government funds, there has been great improvement in food waste in the government sector. However, although private actions like promoting half-size dishes, advocating for to-go boxes, and rewarding customers for finishing all food produced some results locally, the government mostly stayed out of the campaign on regulating food waste in the private realm.

=== 2017 ===
Four years later in 2017, after the high tides of popularity faded, the impact of the Clean Plate campaign could be viewed more objectively. The chairman of the executive board of Goubuli, one of the most famous stuffed baozi restaurants, told the reporter that there were much fewer government branches holding banquets in restaurants using government funding. Most orders taken were from private families. Another major improvement was made in the education sector. Many primary and secondary education institutions embraced the Clean Plate campaign. Schools hosted lessons and programs educating students not to waste food, with school teachers taking the initiative as good examples continue to be an integrated part of school disciplinary and advocacy even four years after.

However, in many other sectors, the food waste trend had returned. In Wuhan, many restaurants had scaled back their commitments to the Clean Plate movement. Popular "half-sized dishes" were no longer provided in many restaurants. One Tianjin company specializing in processing biodegradable waste told reporters that biodegradable waste amounts declined sharply in the beginning of the Clean Plate campaign in 2013. However, levels of waste began climbing in the following years, indicating that the remaining impact of the Clean Plate campaign is very minimal four years after it started.

=== 2020 ===
The second round of the Clean Plate campaign started on 11 August 2020 when CCP general secretary Xi Jinping made a public speech saying that "Waste is shameful and thriftiness is honorable", criticizing the level of food waste in the country being as "shocking and distressing". He stressed the importance of maintaining a sense of crisis, especially as the COVID-19 has "sounded the alarm". However, his directives did not specify detailed actions to solve the problem, leaving local officials and businesses with the space to come up with a large range of methods. In some places, the government's efforts on reducing food waste are concentrated on publicity. In Chongqing, the Federation of Industry and Commerce introduced LED screens displaying "establish a frugal consumption reminder system". However, it seems to produce few results, as Chongqing Daily investigated several restaurants and concluded that food waste is still common.

Some local governments gave more detailed instructions and set up systems. The city of Beijing in September published "The Guideline of stopping food waste and implementing Clean Plate", instructing 9 different dining places, such as dining halls, restaurants and hotels, on issues occurring in the entire food making chain. It means to reduce both food waste and kitchen waste in every step of processing, producing, consuming and disposing. The Wuhan Catering Industry Association proposed a system called "N-1 ordering", meaning that each group could order no more than one dish lower than the number of the diners. Soon, Xianning and Xinyang, in Hubei and Henan province respectively followed the example of Wuhan and made the same proposal. However, this suggestion encountered some suspicions and concerns, as some believed it is too rigid by harming small dining groups and limiting people's food choices. It is also considered to harm the interests of the catering industry and individual restaurants because no restaurant wants to limit customers from ordering more food.

However, there are methods used that are arbitrary and brutal. One restaurant in Changsha, Hunan went as far as demanding its customers to weigh themselves before entering to help them decide the meal size. It soon received harsh criticism and pushback from people, pushing it to apologize to the public.

The central government also started to work on solid solutions towards reducing food waste. Starting in September 2020, the Standing Committee of the National People's Congress initiated a month-long investigation on food security and waste, aiming to expedite the legislative mechanism in establishing the basic code of conduct on catering and daily grocery consumption for the whole society. On 22 December, the draft of the Anti-Food Waste Law was first deliberated during the twenty-fourth meeting on the Standing Committee of the Thirteenth National People's Congress. The legislation was passed on 29 April 2021, through the Standing Committee of the Thirteenth National People's Congress. The Anti-Food Waste Law is the latest and most solid government effort battling food waste since the authority announced the second round of the "Clean Plate campaign" in August 2020.

== Mass media ==
The rapid spread of the Clean Plate campaign across the country in months is regarded by many as a case study into the online activism and mass media in China on the edge of transitioning into the age of mobile internet and new media, with a few key turning points identified as crucial for its mass spread: alignment with government agenda and official endorsement.

=== Alignment with government agenda ===
The Clean Plate campaign, compared to other "mass incidents" in China, is less controversial and sensitive, and aligns with the anti-corruption campaign of Xi Jinping, the new paramount leader of China at the time. While other civil anti-corruption campaigns, such as those calling for the release of the personal assets of officials, are mostly ignored, the Clean Plate campaign received official endorsement and subsequent media coverage.

=== Official endorsement ===
Official coverage of the event helped the campaign to go out of Beijing and spread rapidly to other cities across China as well as on social media sites like Weibo. Xu Zhijun, one of the initiators of the campaign, who made posts on Weibo against food waste for a long time, initially felt the campaign would die out like other similar ones on Weibo. The scope of IN_33's activity was small-scale in the beginning, confined to Beijing city where volunteers personally delivered posters to local restaurants. The turning point came as Xi commented on the Clean Plate campaign and called for a stop on "wasteful habits", after which the official media such as the People's Daily and Guangming Daily made a quick move to cover the campaign, making a further connection to Xi's anti-corruption campaign to cease lavish meals hosted by government officials. People's Daily, with nearly four million followers on Weibo, posted its first message about the Clean Plate campaign on 22 January: "I take pride in cleaning my plate", "say no to waste and save the grains. Don't leave food behind, use a doggy bag, and start from myself." Two-million-follower China Central Television (CCTV) made a call for the campaign as well. The People's Daily reported the forwarding count on Weibo to reach fifty million just two days later, in which the paper released an analysis on online public opinion and found that while 44% of netizens incline towards the spirit of the original campaign, or "clean plate starting from myself", 20% argue that the fundamental is to raise income level and bridge the income gap, and 25% believe that the lavish banquets of officials is a more urgent issue than "Clean Plate" (1). Many other official media commented on the connection between Clean Plate and Xi's campaign. Xinhua News Agency, mouthpiece of the State Council, spoke critically of the "extravagant incident in the Party and in politics" which is "despised yet resistant". Guangming Daily, another official newspaper of the CCP, commented that the civil service should set an example in carrying out the Clean Plate campaign and make it part of the clean governance.

== Food security ==
Food security is often linked to national security. Many countries, although engaged in global free trade are also reserved on unrestricted trading of staple crops. Agricultural subsidies, food price control and high trade barriers while exporting/importing are in place around the world. China also highly values the strategic position of food. During a visit to the country's largest soybean producer in Heilongjiang province in 2018, Chinese leader Xi Jinping said "the rice bowl of the Chinese people, in any situation, must be firmly held in our own hands."

Food security is one key reason the government of China restarted the Clean Plate campaign. Unlike in 2013, the 2020 campaign is mainly driven by the state with a top-down approach. The background of this round of the campaign is deeply rooted in food security concerns made especially serious because of natural disasters, the pandemics and international trade tensions. These three aspects explain the rationale of the Chinese state calling to reduce waste as one step, to lower the food demand, and thus to lower the food price, solve the problem of supply shortage and ensure the food security for the mass.

=== Natural disasters ===
In 2020, a flood, the severest in over twenty years, destroyed thousands of acres of farmland along the Yangtze River, damaging the most abundant and resourceful areas for rice production. By mid-July, Shenwan Hongyuan—a Chinese brokerage firm estimated the loss of Chinese rice production is roughly 5% compared to last year. The traditional Chinese diet has a north–south divide with southerners eating rice and northerners eating wheat as the main staple crop. However, the wheat harvest in 2020 was also not promising. In an announcement issued on 5 August, China's National Food and Strategic Reserves Administration found that the wheat harvest was nearly 1000 tons lower than the 2019 level. Although the relative shortage was not serious enough to starve millions of people, lower supply with unchanged demand means higher price. China's National Bureau of Statistics states a 10% price increase in July compared to a year ago. Because people substitute their crop consumption due to the bad harvest of rice and wheat, corn and soybean became more expensive. There was an estimated 20% price increase in corn and 30% price increase in soybean compared to 2019. In response to the supply shortage and price increase, the government released 62.5 million tons of rice, 50 million tons of corn and over 760,000 tons of soybeans from Beijing's strategic reserves by the end of July to stabilize the food market. This amount was nearly double the volume released during the whole of 2019. Within the same year, there was also a summer drought in the north, unprecedented typhoons in the northeast and a pest outbreak in the southwest. Such harsh climate conditions made not only farming but also the whole domestic supply chain very difficult; for example, transportation.

=== Pandemics ===
An African swine fever outbreak in 2019–20 seriously damaged pork production in China, raising the pork price in many places doubled for almost a year. Pork is the dominant meat consumption in China, and as a result weighs heavily on its Consumer Price Index (CPI). Results show that at the end of 2020, China's pork price jumped 110.2% from a year earlier, making the CPI rise 4.5% compared to the data in the previous year, which is the highest increase of this inflation measurement in eight years.

In 2020, the outbreak of COVID-19 marked another crisis. "Strict lockdown measures in the early part of 2020 also cast a psychological shadow over many Chinese farmers, who began to stockpile more crops at home and were more reluctant to sell to wholesalers, out of concern that there would be a resurgence of the coronavirus." Such behaviors reduced the supply of crops in the market, which further drives up the price. Due to the pandemic, many people, especially under-protected marginalized populations, were very vulnerable to such a price increase of staple food and pork. Another aspect affecting food supply and price is rage purchasing or food stocking. A survey in April 2020 showed that 79% of respondents stocked up dry food items like rice, noodles, flours etc. during the coronavirus outbreak. Fearing the second wave of the pandemic, a higher stock of food than usual was required. According to basic economic theory, higher demand usually leads to a higher price, which adds more pressure to the middle-lower class in China on their food security.

=== International trade tensions ===
COVID-19 makes international trade difficult, which in turn makes foreign food supply to China highly unstable. Policy-wise, many countries, including Russia, Ukraine and Vietnam, imposed strong restrictions on food exports. According to a senior trader at one of China's leading food processors, "They have advised us to increase stocks, keep supplies higher than we usually have. Things are not looking good in Brazil," regarding concerns over China's main supplier of soybeans and a key meat exporter where the coronavirus infections had exceeded the number in Spain and Italy in May.

As a result, China resorted to the U.S. for soybean and meat supplies. This is also partially due to the bilateral agreements signed to end the U.S.–China trade war, in which China promised to increase its purchase of American agricultural products, especially soybeans. However, the shadow of trade tensions adds anxiety and uncertainty to the Chinese government especially at the height of a global crisis. Such perceived over-reliance on importing food from the U.S. is politically and strategically unpopular to the Chinese government. The central committee of China in the next five years specified to prioritize national food security, intending to reduce China's reliance on agriculture imports from countries such as the U.S. and Australia, with whom Beijing's relations have become tense. This is a dilemma to the Chinese government and makes food security a national security issue practically.

== Food waste ==
Food waste prevails in recent years for various reasons, including increasing agricultural productivity and yield, increasing food availability and choices, cultural tradition of lavish banquets, and food marketing. It could also be related to past experience of serious food shortages and famines. Such experiences have resulted in some social behaviors like food waste especially in buffets and hoarding supplies when any incidents or even rumors appear. Those have a negative impact on food security with uneven food distribution between urban and rural, coastal areas and massive inland. It also increases the risks of price inflation and occasional shortage when people overreact towards the food market.

These problems have been increasingly alarming to the Chinese government, as they consider food the basis and key to the country's independent sovereignty, stability and prosperity. Such waste, which undermines food security, has been one of the top concerns of the Chinese society. With a mass population of farmers and tradition of agriculture, food and planting is a strong cultural symbol throughout Chinese history. However, feeding a population of hundreds of millions of people is not easy; famines happened many times, even after the establishment of the People's Republic of China (PRC) in 1949. To the older Chinese population, the feeling and memory of hunger is still fresh, which dictates their dining habits. Some keep living frugally because that is what they have been used to, but some have "revenge spending" on food, as "If there's something left in the plates, they have their face. They have a sense of security. If you have more than you actually need, it's something to be proud of." Zhang Ye, one campaigner of the movement explains the rationale of food wasting in relation with famines in the past.

Although the Chinese government subsidizes farming and purposefully controls the price of main grains and groceries, there are still many challenges. A report by the Chinese Academy of Science found that in 2015 residents in big cities, including Beijing and Shanghai, wasted 17 to 18 million tons of food, or enough to feed 30 to 50 million people. A quarter of the waste was staple foods like rice and noodles, and about 18% of its meat, the report said. With this level of waste, the Chinese government has paid close attention to the problem and responded quickly with big social events that advocated or encouraged food wastes.

=== Eating livestreams ===
As a result of the seriousness of food waste, some new major incidents and trends of social behaviors in resulting food waste become the targets for the government to crackdown. For example, "eating livestreams", or mukbang, originated in South Korea in 2010 has become very popular in China. To some, watching people eating piles of food in front of them is appealing and satisfying. This market demand attracts a lot of people entering the field. However, one often needs to really stand out in this competitive market to gain subscribers, fame and money. So many of them adopt a similar practice of eating contestants in speed eating (or competitive eating). They consume a lot more food than what a normal person could eat, like 10 bowls of noodles or 20 hamburgers a meal. Because most of the people uploading their eating videos cannot really eat that much food in a short period of time, instead of real speed eating, what many of them will purposefully vomit what they have eaten to take in more food. This happens repeatedly, so a 20-minute video could be made after editing hours of raw footage. In the cases of real livestreams, streamers will also use emetic measures after the stream, so they can quickly get ready for the next stream. This production cycle damages many people's health and results in serious food waste. It became a public secret for its popularity andvsoon attracted the attention of authorities calling to end or fundamentally rectify such practices.

=== Milk pouring at Youth with You 3 ===
The talent selection show Youth With You 3 is the third season of the series featuring 119 male trainees competing to form a final group of 9 through global viewers' votes. It is produced by a Chinese video platform "iQiyi" and was broadcast on it since 18 February 2021. The controversy centered at the serious food waste due to the platform's publicity strategy of printing QR codes inside the yogurt drink bottles to enable fans of the show to support their favorite contestants. Due to the high popularity and large fan base of the show and individual contestants, the craze for voting triggered large food waste because supporters would buy hundreds of thousands of bottles of the drink to only get the QR code. Because people cannot finish the drink, they would simply pour them out. This has gone beyond individuals' actions of food waste, instead it shows that about 40 to 50 people were hired for the job every day.

In early May, a video went viral on Chinese internet, showing tens of people hired to open the caps of those drinks and then pour the milk out. It is estimated that there were roughly 270,000 bottles of the beverage being wasted. The excessive food waste for the sole purpose of supporting idols angered Chinese netizens. Some of them wrote that if the idols' fans did not want the drinks, they could simply give them out to delivery workers, workers on construction sites and such, though this is something hard to be implemented. Since the supporters have to open the lids to retrieve the QR code, the dairy drinks will go bad very soon. Giving out tons of drinks that have been opened could also be problematic if there were cases of illness or food-poisoning.

This controversy soon caught the attention of the government. Beijing Municipal Radio and Television Bureau on 5 May ordered Youth with You Season 3 to be suspended, days before the grand finale was scheduled to be aired. It is believed that the platform and sponsors' actions in inducing consumption of crazy fan behavior and the resulting food waste has violated laws in China. "The auditing standards for internet variety show content" prohibits the methods of purposefully inducing people use materialized means like purchasing goods or membership subscription to support the contestants. Moreover, this incident coincides with "law of anti-food waste" which was passed through the Standing Committee of the Thirteenth National People's Congress on April 29, 2021, which is only about a week before this controversy. Under the law, eateries could face a penalty of between 1,000 yuan (US$160) and 10,000 yuan (US$1,600) if they mislead customers into ordering excessive quantities of food while food manufacturers could be fined between 5,000 yuan (US$785) and 50,000 yuan (US$7,850) for causing wastage in the productions.

China's state media Xinhua News Agency also published a commentary in response, criticizing the production company and the sponsor for neglecting their social responsibility when adopting their promotion strategies. In the following days, iQiyi and Mengniu Dairy apologized on their social media account, the final round of the competition was cancelled and all the voting channels were closed.

== Anti-corruption campaign ==
=== Level of corruption before the campaign ===
China's level of state corruption is pervasive before the anti-corruption campaign. The Los Angeles Times in 2008 estimated that corruption in China is as high as roughly 3–15% of China's seven trillion dollar (USD) economy. Transparency International's Corruption Perception Index 2012 also ranks China the 80th most corrupt country out of 176. The 2012 Anti-Corruption Blue Book, published by the Chinese Academy of Social Sciences, indicates that China's corruption touches upon all aspects of the society. Political corruption hinders economic development, people's trust towards the government and social stability, which are all dangerous signals for the incumbent administration, especially considering that the last round of concerns over state corruption led to demonstrations across the country in the 1980s, which finally escalated to a serious confrontation known as the Tiananmen incident. Decades later, when the issue of corruption rose onto the surface again, CCP leader Xi Jinping launched the anti-corruption campaign to curb extreme corruption within the party and within the bureaucratic system.

Because of the close bond between corruption and extravagant government dining, part of Xi's campaign made use of the grassroots Clean Plate campaign in early 2013 to make government funding usage more transparent and restrained. In 2013, Beijing Youth Daily presented a survey indicating that 97.8% of respondents in the survey felt that Chinese officials were wasting public funds. Among them, there are 33.8% people believed that official reception was the place those funds were wasted, like for lavish feasts.

=== Impact ===
Excess food waste, the core issue addressed by the Clean Plate campaign, is connected to the excessive spending of government funding on dining tables. The director of the Institute of Law and Social Sciences at Renmin University of China, Zhou Xiaozheng justified the connection between fighting waste and fighting corruption, stating that "Since the issuance of Xi's eight-point guide for official conduct at the end of 2012, an average of 3,000 metric tons of kitchen waste per day had been reduced in Beijing (20–30% of total kitchen waste, depending on the data source), mainly due to reduced public consumption". The timing coincides with the Clean Plate campaign, which started in January 2013, when top officials including Xi Jinping and numerous state news reports supported the movement by stressing the importance of reducing food waste and emphasizing the significance of stopping lavish banquets that used government funding, seen everywhere in Chinese bureaucracies at the time. In 2012, China's Commerce Ministry reported that government officials spent $48 billion on state banquets, but due to the Clean Plate campaign bonding with the anti-corruption campaign, the sale of luxury food items was cut in half. In Beijing and Shanghai, business had dropped by as much as 35% in the catering industry.

The campaign shows significant results in halting widespread extravagant dining using taxpayers' money. Even four years after the campaign, people indicate a higher confidence in public funding and officials' banquets. The chairman of the Board at New Century Tourism Group Co., Ltd. told reporter in 2017 that there has been a sharp decline in food waste from officials' banquets due to limiting the use of government funding, "because they are more likely to waste food while using others' money". However, along with the decline in lavish feasts held in outside restaurants, the levels of food waste in the dining halls of government institutions have increased. Due to the tradition of "rewarding the public servants", food in the dining halls of government institutions is provided at a price much lower than the market price. Since the campaign, more luxuriously decorated dining halls have been built, often including private rooms for inviting and treating guests. This phenomenon shows the incompleteness of the campaign, because waste is still present in this form while there is less public exposure and social influence.

== Controversies ==
=== Responses to the 2013 Clean Plate campaign ===
==== Domestic responses ====
Chinese people largely responded very positively and actively to the campaign in 2013.

This movement took the opportunity of the early stage of internet development, and successfully used this platform to achieve high publicity, social mobilization and education purposes. This could be seen through the massive participation under the original post and the general topic on the social media platform Weibo, where many netizens voluntarily joined the movement by showing pictures of clean plates after meals. It shows that within days since the movement started with the Weibo post, there have been over 50 million retweets of the original post. This number is extraordinary considering the relatively limited Internet access ten years ago.

Beyond the internet realm, dining places like the restaurants also participated in movement to actively seek positive changes. It started in the beginning of the movement, there were quite a few restaurants participating in hanging poster and handing out flyers on reducing food waste in Beijing. Later, as the popularity spread to the country, restaurants in different provinces start to implement different tools to reduce food waste. Attempts include offering half-sized dishes, to-go boxes/bags, and additional rewards for customers who finish all their food.

Educational institutions also followed up on this movement very quickly. Many schools use different approaches to encourage students not to waste food. Some methods focuses on education, which include engaging parents, telling stories and singing related songs to educate children the significance of reducing food waste; some methods changed the way of dining like reducing the serving portion based on students' different needs. Some methods uses the rewarding mechanism, honoring kids and classes who do well in participating related activities and eat up their food. There are also activities like bringing students to rural areas to experience farming and more frugal living. It is reported that the University of Science and Technology Beijing indicated that the food waste has been reduced from 35 to 40 barrels in the two dining halls on campus to 22–25 barrels since the "Clean Plate Campaign", which is almost 40% decrease from the original level.

The government also contributed greatly to this campaign by increasing publicity, setting regulations on government funded-dining and local governments' supervision and monitoring on private effort. Starting on 20 January, different state media published commentaries and reports endorsing the movement. On 28 January, Xi Jinping instructed on the issue by stressing the significance of disciplining party members and state officials' public-funded dining behaviors and urging the relevant authorities to implement measures to ensure food security. Individuals and groups in China have been very used to and accepting of the guidelines from above. Some of the effort by restaurants and schools mentioned above were also in part made possible because of the various papers and instructions from above demanding changes, for example the issue of "The Announcement about doing frugal education and establishing economical schools" by the Ministry of Education on 26 February 2013. The most solid major achievement from the state's effort is to successfully regulate the officials in wasting taxpayers' money on lavish banquets, which helps to reduce an average of 3,000 metric tons of kitchen waste per day in Beijing only.

==== International responses ====
International responses towards the movement in 2013 were also mainly positive. People saw Chinese huge food waste as a real problem and complimented the campaign to be a positive influence that could change the situation. Responding to the challenge of cutting down on waste among China's newly wealthy, some said that "a new grassroots "Clean Your Plate" campaign is gaining steam, and starting to change the way people think about leftovers".

As Zhang Ye, one helped organize China's "Clean Plate campaign" says, the movement "started from bottom to top, and then was promoted from top to bottom." So some of the negative responses internationally came from the skepticism of the Chinese state's intervention. Some media showed concern over the duration and systemic impact of this campaign: "the operation against food waste develops into a movement of political importance, it may render the campaign short-lived, instead of making real changes in the institutional system". The reasoning behind it is that people need to fully understand the problem to deploy the best strategy to change, however the government's top-down measure is often too arbitrary and "one size fits all" which usually only eliminate the problem on the surface while causing new unintended problems. There were two examples given to support this argument. First, an annual banquet of a government agency was suddenly called off after serving the first few dishes when officials learned about the attitude and regulation above, which ends up wasting all those food prepared while those people will still find another place to get them fed. The second one is at school, where students were too afraid of leftovers that a student threw up for finishing a dish, while another cried over a meatball given by mistake. These reports suggested that the government's intervention actually harmed the grass-root campaign and hindered more creative and humanitarian approaches.

=== Responses to the 2020 Clean Plate campaign ===
Xi's call for a second round of Clean Plate campaign directed international attention to the rising food insecurity in China. Xi's message is seen as an emphasis on self-reliance of food supply amid a growing tension with the United States and short-terms disruptions to its food production and importation such as the COVID-19 pandemic and summer floods. The vague wording left plenty of room for speculation to be filled up by official media accounts squashing worries of an immediate food shortage. The timing of Xi's message is also particularly important, released only weeks after the massive summer floods.

The state's intervention on the daily life of citizens is another heated topic. BBC reports criticism of the "N-1" ordering limit as "too rigid", and other comments questioning why the campaign does not target the lavish banquets of the officials. CNN quotes political analyst Wu Qiang that "Even the most politically apathetic person can feel their daily life habits challenged and threatened (by this campaign)" while highlighting the privacy intrusion in some local government's practices, who reportedly monitor food waste by encouraging citizens to report such behaviors, or installing surveillance cameras next to the food dumps in government canteens.

== Important Notes ==
In Buddhism, wastefulness is believed to diminish one's blessings. The Buddhist concept of "Five Contemplations" during meals emphasizes reflecting on the difficulty of obtaining food, thereby cultivating gratitude and a sense of thrift. This concept reminds believers to avoid wastefulness in order to protect their blessings. Buddhist Master Da an points out that wasting food is regarded as "squandering the gifts of nature," which is the most detrimental behavior to one's blessings. However, if leftover food is packed in plastic containers and the containers are discarded after use, it can cause plastic pollution. A solution is to avoid ordering too much food when dining out by implementing the "N-1 ordering model," where "N" represents the number of diners and "-1" means ordering one less dish than the number of people. If packing leftovers, do not discard the container carelessly, consciously sort the garbage, and bring your own containers for takeaway when eating out. Reusable packaging should be used as many times as possible to reduce the generation of plastic waste.
