= John Forrest (producer) =

John Forrest is a UK production creative who has made significant contributions to the UK broadcast production scene since 1970. He currently presents Pause for Thought on BBC Radio 2 and The Daily Service on BBC Radio 4. He was a founder member of staff with BBC Radio Manchester, one of the first established BBC local stations in England. He launched a religious programme aimed at children – "The Two O'clock Spot", the format of which was later taken up by other BBC Radio stations.

In 1973 he joined the establishing staff at LBC Radio in London as features producer and later as deputy head of programmes. Whilst there he invented the character of Mr Nasty for the children's phone-in programme Jellybone. Mr Nasty became an instant success and later transferred to the Granada Television children's series "Fun Factory".

He worked for several year's as a researcher/arranger with Thames Television in London, assisting in the creation of HELP, a series of social action programmes. In the late 1970s he became programme director with the London-based "Arts Centre Group" where his production credits included work with Cliff Richard, Roy Castle and Jack Parnell.

He re-joined the BBC as a network radio producer in 1981 where credits included "Talkabout" for BBC Radio 1, "Good Morning Sunday" for BBC Radio 2 and documentaries for BBC Radio 4. His production of "Peace on Earth" received an award for "Creative Use of Radio" from the Sony Radio Academy Awards. He devised and produced the BBC "Choir Girl of the Year" (Now BBC Chorister of the Year) and he received International UNDA and Sandford St Martin Awards for BBC Radio 2's Pause for Thought.

Following a number of Television series produced for BBC Two with the BBC education unit Forrest joined the production staff of Songs of Praise, making programmes in Atlanta, Vienna, Palm Beach, Manchester United FC and Everton FC stadia. His production from the Millennium Stadium in Cardiff on 2 January 2000 became the largest ever Songs of Praise programme ever made, with an attending live audience of 60,000, a choir of 6,000 and 100 Welsh Harps assembled for the occasion. The programme received a British Academy of Film and Television Arts (BAFTA) nomination.

Forrest continued his production as a freelance producer-director in 2001. He devised and produced the BBC School Choir of the Year in 2002 and produced the event for a further seven years. His musical TV production/direction included DVDs for the New English Orchestra, the All Souls Orchestra (London) and live directing for the BBC's recording of The Proms from London's Royal Albert Hall and a broadcast award for a Premier Christian Radio programme with the "Still Band Time". Since 2018 he has been based in the South East of England and continues to make short films.

He founded the Insight Film Festival and has been involved in developing media training for creatives and others facing broadcast cameras, as well as production work in several countries. In 2009 he was part of a business consortium founding The Northern Advantage which developed entrepreneurial skills amongst creative professionals.

== Sources ==
- Songs of Praise
- Article in the Jewish Chronicles re. the Insight Film Festival
- johnforrest.tv
