= Monat =

American multi-level marketing company

Monat Global Corp.
- Company type: Privately held company
- Industry: Multi-level marketing
- Founded: October 2014; 11 years ago
- Headquarters: Doral, Florida, United States
- Key people: Luis Urdaneta (co-founder and chairperson); Rayner Urdaneta (co-founder and CEO)
- Products: Hair care, skin care and wellness
- Revenue: $380m (2022)
- Website: monatglobal.com

Monat Global Corp., or simply Monat (/moʊ.ˈnæt/, /moʊ.ˈneɪt/), is a privately-held American multi-level marketing company headquartered in Doral, Florida, which sells haircare, skincare, and wellness products. It is a subsidiary of the Alcora Corporation, a private-labeling company formed in 2001. Monat operates in the United States, Canada, the United Kingdom, Ireland, Poland, Spain, Australia, New Zealand, Lithuania, France, Mexico, Germany, Belgium, and Colombia.

== History ==
Luis Urdaneta (chairman) and Rayner Urdaneta (CEO) co-founded the company in 2014 (originally Alcora Group). They began with haircare products and expanded into skincare in 2019 and wellness in 2020. The wellness line was developed through a partnership with Dr. Brent Agin and includes supplements, mixes, and powders which the company claims supports energy, digestion, beauty, and sleep.

== Position on animal testing ==
In 2018, Monat was recognized by Cruelty Free International as a Leaping Bunny Approved Brands, certifying that no animals were harmed or affected in the creation of their products at the ingredient level. All of the company's products are vegan.

== Philanthropy ==
Monat donates to nonprofit organizations around the world through its charitable platform Monat Gratitude, established in 2014 when the company was founded. All net profits from its limited edition Helping Hand Gift Sets were donated to nonprofits focused on assisting at-risk youth. This included Big Brothers Big Sisters of America, Horizons for Youth, Chance UK, SOS Wioski Dziecięce, and the Irish Society of the Prevention of Cruelty to Children (ISPCC). During the COVID-19 pandemic, Monat Gratitude donated disaster relief kits and hand sanitizer to hospitals and other organizations including the Salvation Army Winnipeg, Kelowna Gospel Mission, and the Toronto Police.

In November 2022, the Monat Gratitude donated $288,000 to support communities in Puerto Rico, Florida and Canada who were impacted by Hurricanes Fiona and Ian.

== Lawsuits and legal issues ==
Monat has been the subject of ten lawsuits and hundreds of complaints to the U.S. Food and Drug Administration and Better Business Bureau. Monat retaliated against some of the complainants by filing unsuccessful defamation lawsuits.

In 2018, and again in 2020, Monat's products were tested at the independent clinical testing labs of Kosmoscience Ciencia & Tecnologia Cosmetica Ltda, an ISO 17025-certified laboratory in Brazil. Kosmoscience has also tested products for L’Oreal, Unilever, Procter & Gamble, and Johnson & Johnson. The tests reported that Monat's products did not promote hair breakage or hair damage.

In March 2019, a federal report filed by the FDA after inspecting Monat's Florida manufacturing facility found that multiple products were "prepared, packed, or held under unsanitary conditions whereby (they) may have become contaminated with filth". An FDA legal expert said that the report "falls on the mild side of the enforcement spectrum and notes fairly common issues."

In October 2019, a ruling by the U.S. district court in Miami, Florida allowed a consumer class action lawsuit against Monat to proceed, although the judge noted that plaintiffs may have difficulty proving that the company's products are to blame for their injuries. The judge in the case said that the plaintiffs sufficiently alleged that Monat's products were defectively designed using contaminated chemicals and that the company had failed to inspect their ingredients for contamination. In a separate court case, a judge ruled that the plaintiffs had no constitutional standing to seek injunctive relief from Monat.

In 2020, the Florida Attorney General terminated its investigation into Monat after the company signed an Assurance of Voluntary Compliance.

In 2024, former president and director Stuart MacMillan sued the company for breach of contract and fraud. He claimed that the company uses low quality ingredients and that the owners run a no-show job scheme to funnel money to their family members.
