= Be Still for the Presence of the Lord =

British hymn

- Hymn
- Text: by David J. Evans
- Meter: irregular
- Melody: by David J. Evans
- Published: 1986

"Be Still for the Presence of the Lord" is a contemporary hymn written by Welsh songwriter David J. Evans in 1986. Evans was involved in the charismatic movement but felt that some of its worship risked treating God in a trivial fashion. Specifically, he was inspired by the phrase in the Old Testament – "then Jacob awoke from his sleep and said 'surely the Lord is in this place and I did not know it.'" Also inspirational was Exodus 3: 1–6, where Moses met the Yahweh at the burning bush.

This hymn has been heard on the BBC's Songs of Praise and was voted as one of the UK's 10 most popular hymns in 2019.
