= Murder of Logan Mwangi =

2021 death of a child in Bridgend, Wales

- Location: Sarn, Bridgend, Wales
- Type: Child murder, domestic violence
- Deaths: Logan Mwangi
- Convicted: Angharad Williamson; John Cole; Craig Mulligan
- Sentence: Life imprisonment

The murder of Logan Mwangi occurred in late July 2021 in Sarn, Bridgend, South Wales. The precise nature of the events leading up to the 5-year-old boy's death are difficult to ascertain, but his mother (Angharad Williamson), stepfather (John Cole), and Cole's step-son (Craig Mulligan) are all believed to have participated in and been aware of physical attacks which led to Logan developing severe external and internal injuries. Williamson, Cole, and Mulligan were found guilty of murder in April 2022.

== Background ==
Logan Mwangi
- Born: 15 March 2016
- Died: c. 31 July 2021 (aged 5)
- Known for: Murder victim

Logan Mwangi was born on 15 March 2016 in the Princess of Wales Hospital, Bridgend. His parents were Angharad Williamson and Benjamin Mwangi. His mother had a criminal record dating from prior to his birth. Logan was mixed race with a white mother and a father of Kenyan descent. They separated soon after his birth, with Benjamin Mwangi returning to his hometown of Brentwood, Essex. Williamson began a relationship with John Cole in 2019. Cole was a former member of the National Front who had received a series of criminal convictions, some of them for violent offences in the 2000s, and had a reputation for racism. He was known to use racist insults about Logan.

Cole moved in with Williamson and the couple had a son together in January 2020. They ended all contact between Logan and his father who last saw each other in 2019. Cole and Williamson were described by a family friend as "strict parents" who took a punitive approach to disciplining the boy. Punishments Logan experienced included being forced to spend extended periods in push-up positions, prevented from participating in family takeaways, made to stand outside in the garden, and deliberately burnt. A neighbour said that Logan's bedroom window was constantly covered with a sheet and that he was frequently shouted at by Cole.

Logan's condition declined during the early months of the COVID-19 pandemic in 2020. During this time, Cole's 12-year-old stepson Craig Mulligan and his mother had joined the household due to the latter inaccurately claiming to be suffering from cancer. In August, Logan broke his arm after falling down the stairs. His mother initially said she did not immediately seek medical treatment but instead tried to “pop” the bone back into its socket. She later alleged that it was Cole who did this and Mulligan who had pushed Logan down the stairs. The incident was referred to the police. Logan was described by his teachers as returning to school in September with a stammer, incontinence issues and an unhealthy appearance. In January 2021, Logan was placed on the child protection register which meant that social workers would visit the family once every ten days. These visits began in March and continued until Logan's death. Early in 2021, Mulligan was assaulted by his mother. This led to them both leaving the household with the former being removed from his mother's custody and the latter being sectioned under the Mental Health Act.

On 26 July 2021, 13-year-old Craig Mulligan was placed in Cole's custody. The son of Cole's previous partner, Mulligan was an aggressive boy with a history of mental health problems. Cole had raised Mulligan as his own son since he was nine months old. He had been living in local authority care for six months after being assaulted by his mother. One of the foster families he lived with described him as having threatened to kill them. They said he had spoken fondly of Cole and Williamson but expressed a desire to kill Logan whose name he never used.

== Murder ==
On 21 July 2021, Logan tested positive for COVID-19. Under the COVID-19 pandemic related rules of the time he had to spend 10 days isolated at home. Cole and Williamson made him spend his period of isolation separated from the rest of his household in his room. He was last seen alive by someone outside the household on 27 July. That day Cole had a FaceTime call with a friend who saw Logan colouring on the stairs and described him as appearing "happy and joyful".

The precise chain of events which led to Logan's death is unknown with different suspects providing different accounts. However, physical attacks on him appear to have escalated on 29 July possibly due to a broken stereo which was blamed on Logan. Logan's social worker made a visit to the household that day but was not allowed to see him due to his illness. An altercation between Williamson and Mulligan took place that afternoon with the latter physically preventing the former from leaving the property and both appearing very emotionally agitated. Shortly after 2.43 a.m. on 31 July, Cole and Mulligan were recorded on CCTV footage removing Logan's body from the house. They then made a second trip to discard his damaged pyjama top. Someone in one of the neighbouring houses overheard a verbal disagreement at 5 a.m. between a woman and a man where the former expressed concern that her son had disappeared.

== Police investigation and trial ==
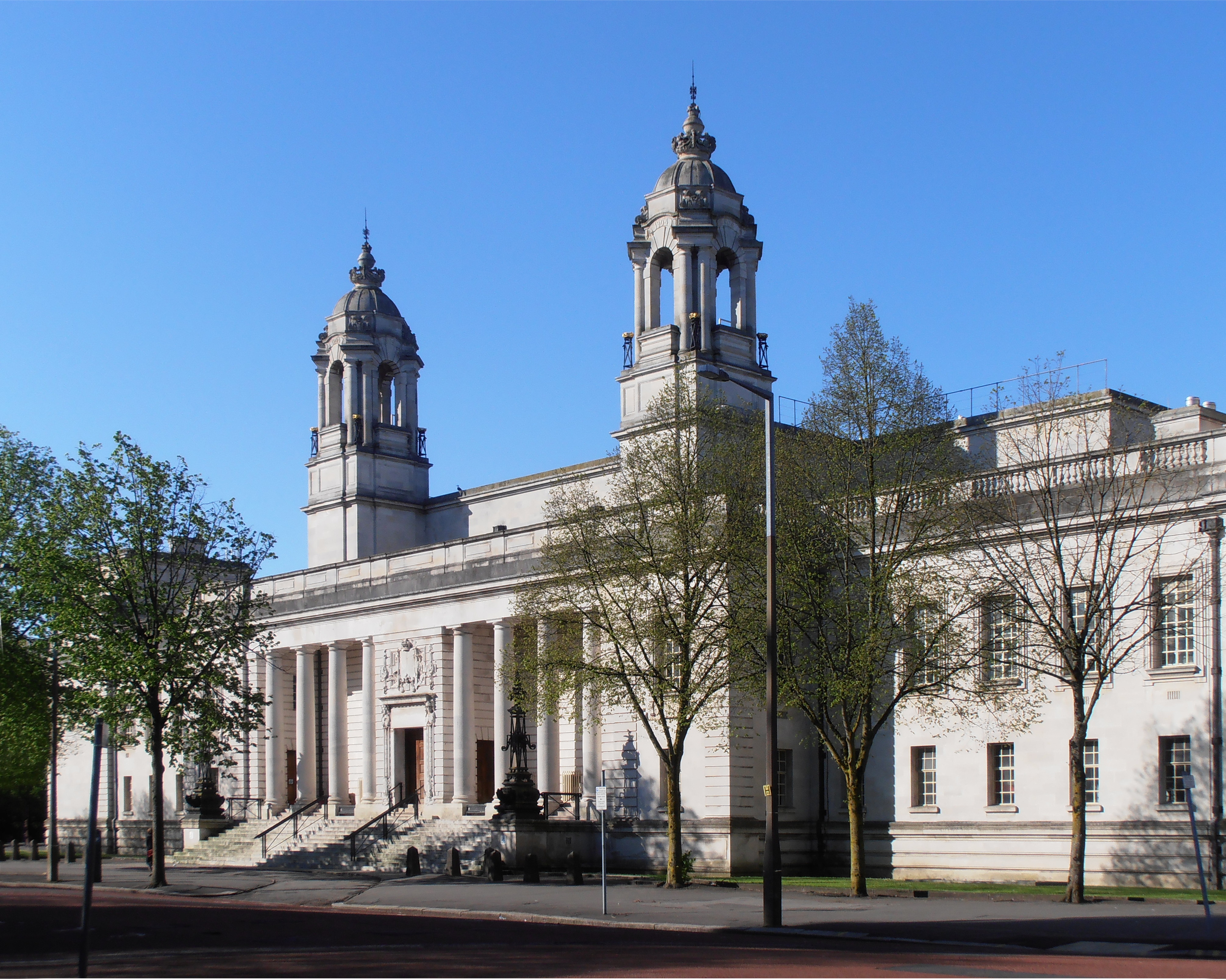
Cardiff Crown Court where the trial took place (pictured here in 2012)

Soon after the overheard disagreement, Williamson called the police to say that Logan was missing. A police search began and Logan's body was found in the River Ogmore. He was pronounced dead at the Princess of Wales hospital. Logan had sustained 63 external injuries as well as damage to his internal organs. Pathologists described his injuries as "indicative of a severe, localised blunt force trauma injury", said he would have survived them for "at least several hours" and that his caretakers "would have been aware" that he was injured.

Cole, Williamson, and Mulligan were all arrested on suspicion of murder on the day after the discovery of Logan's body. They initially denied responsibility for Logan's death, first saying that he had disappeared from their home without their knowledge. However, evidence uncovered during the investigation suggested that they had all participated. This included CCTV footage of the two males removing the body, the nature of Logan's injuries and indications that Williamson had been awake throughout the night the body was discarded. Angharad Williamson, John Cole and Craig Mulligan were found guilty of murder and perverting the course of justice in Cardiff Crown Court in April 2022. They were later sentenced in June 2022 to life sentences with a minimum 28, 29 and 15 years respectively.

== Aftermath ==
Following the case, an inspection of local child protection services in Bridgend and a review of the specific events leading up to Logan Mwangi's death took place. Some experts in the field along with some of the Welsh Government's political opponents suggested that an independent review of child protection services in Wales should be organised. Supporters of this idea suggested that there were "profound problems" with child protection services in Wales and noted that Wales was the only part of the UK where a review was not currently taking place. Donald Forrester, a professor of social work at Cardiff University suggested that Wales's larger numbers of children in the care of the state in comparison to England could lead to children in the most danger being missed. First Minister of Wales Mark Drakeford said in relation to the idea of an inquiry that "There will be a serious case review into the events surrounding the tragic death of that child. We will wait for that to be completed to see whether there any more general points in it that we will need to draw out on a wider basis".

The young age of one of the suspects, Craig Mulligan, who was 13 when the crime happened and 14 when he went on trial, received some attention. He had been placed in his stepfather's custody shortly before the murder even though he had previously expressed his extreme hostility to Logan. A family law campaigner and former Liberal Democrat MP John Hemming argued that the private Family Court judgment which placed Mulligan in the care of Cole should be released to the public.

In England and Wales, a child can be held criminally responsible for their actions from the age of ten. Activist and chair of the National Association for Youth Justice, Tim Bakeman, suggested that the age of criminal responsibility should be raised to 16 with children who break the law being detained in secure childcare establishments. He said that the same treatment of young offenders would take place without them being placed in the criminal justice system. However, Lawrence Lee, a solicitor who worked on another case involving young killers, the Murder of James Bulger, said that children should be tried in court for crimes commenting that "children now are much more aware, they are so aware of their rights... a lot of children are so streetwise they purposely hide behind the veil of anonymity, because they know they're not going to be named... There's no way that these defendants can go free and they've got to be punished, but they've got to be educated as well if that's possible."
