= Woodstock Fruit Festival =

Festival in New York

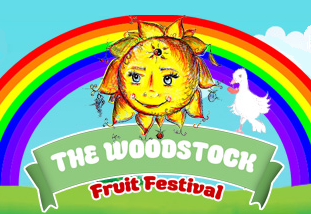
Logo

The Woodstock Fruit Festival is a nonprofit festival celebrating a fruit-based diet that is held in upstate New York, which has been running every August since 2011. In 2013 the fitness activities, lectures and 24-hour fruit bar (as well as gourmet fruit-based dinners) drew in excess of 600 participants for the 7-day festival. In 2014 the WFF announced that there would be 2 weeks rather than one.

Michael Arnstein is the founder of the festival.

Media attention came from as far away as the Dutch press de Volkskrant, Huffington Post and NY Magazine.

The COVID-19 pandemic caused officials to scrap the 2020 festival and defer it to 2021.

== See also ==
- Fruitarianism
- Raw veganism
