= Mukbang =

Online broadcast involving eating

- Example of a mukbang

Korean name
- Hangul: 먹방
- Hanja: 먹放
- RR: meokbang
- MR: mŏkpang
- IPA: [mʌk̚p͈aŋ]

Original phrase
- Hangul: 먹는 방송
- Hanja: 먹는 放送
- RR: meongneun bangsong
- MR: mŏngnŭn pangsong
- IPA: [mʌŋnɯn paŋsʰoŋ]

A mukbang (UK: /ˈmʌkbæŋ/ MUK-bang, US: /ˈmʌkbɑːŋ/ MUK-bahng; Korean: 먹방; pronounced [mʌk̚p͈aŋ]; lit. 'eating broadcast') is a video or online broadcast in which a host eats food while interacting with the audience or providing commentary. The genre originated in South Korea and gained popularity there in the early 2010s, before spreading internationally since the mid-2010s.

A mukbang may be either prerecorded or streamed live through a webcast on multiple streaming platforms such as Soop (formerly AfreecaTV), YouTube, Instagram, TikTok, and Twitch. In live sessions, the mukbang host chats with audiences, who type in real time in the live chat room. Eating shows are expanding their influence on internet broadcasting platforms and serve as virtual communities and as venues for active communication among internet users.

Mukbangers from many different countries have gained considerable popularity on numerous social websites and have established the mukbang as a viable alternative career path with a potential to earn a high income for young South Koreans. By cooking and eating food on camera for a large audience, mukbangers generate income from advertising, sponsorships, endorsements, as well as viewer support. However, there has been growing criticism of mukbang's promotion of unhealthy eating habits, particularly eating disorders, animal cruelty and food waste. As mukbang has become more popular, dietitians have expressed concern about this trend and have proposed restrictions on food-related content on social media.

== Etymology ==
Mukbang is an ad-hoc romanization of the Korean word meokbang (먹방). Mukbang has been adopted as a word in the English language. The Korean term is a clipped compound or portmanteau of the words for 'eating' (먹는; meongneun) and 'broadcast' (방송; bangsong).

== Historical background and origins ==
Prior to the 21st century, Korea traditionally had a food culture based on healthy eating practices and strict Confucian etiquette. However, during the late 2000s, a new food culture has emerged in South Korea characterized by internet eating (mukbang). It was first introduced on the real-time internet TV service AfreecaTV in 2009 and has become a trend on cable channels and terrestrial broadcasting. This form of programming emphasizes the attractiveness of the person who prepares the food. Eating and cooking shows are effective programs for broadcasting companies as production costs are lower than reality entertainment programs.

The 1982 Danish film 66 Scenes from America contains a scene with a similar concept to the modern mukbang in which artist Andy Warhol eats a Whopper hamburger from the fast food restaurant chain Burger King.

Academics have linked the origins of mukbang in South Korea to widespread feelings of anxiety, loneliness and unhappiness among many South Koreans, driven by the hyper-competitive nature of the country's socioeconomic conditions and society. Consequently, mukbang gives them an opportunity to relieve some of these stressors.

In each broadcast, a host will interact with their viewers through online chat rooms. Many hosts generate revenue through mukbang by accepting donations or partnering with advertising networks. The popularity of mukbang streams has spread outside of Korea, with online streamers hosting mukbang in other countries. In 2016, Twitch introduced new categories like "social eating" to spotlight them. Articles about mukbang have also appeared in The Huffington Post and The Wall Street Journal. The term "mukbang" has been widely adopted in other types of eating shows, such as those featuring ASMR on YouTube.

This eating performance from South Korea has also rapidly spread in influence and popularity to other Asian countries, such as Japan and China. In China, mukbang is called "chibo"; hosts make their content into short videos and vlogs and upload them onto social media platforms like Weibo.

== Culture ==
The contrast to the traditional eating culture that revolves around eating from the same communal dishes at the family dinner table has been acknowledged.

Mukbangs provide a virtual social dining experience that helps alleviate loneliness through creating a sense of companionship for socially isolated individuals who seek connection through shared meal experiences. The growing popularity of these videos reflects a real social need, as shown by UK statistics where 15% of viewers report not having a shared meal with family members in over six months.

It has been suggested one can vicariously satisfy the desire for food by viewing. In Korea, individuals who stream mukbang are called broadcast jockeys (BJs). As a result, high level of interaction BJ-to-viewer and viewer-to-viewer contributes to the sociability aspect of producing and consuming mukbang content. For example, during broadcast jockey Changhyun's interaction with his audience he temporarily paused to follow a fan's directions on what to eat next and how to eat it. Viewers may influence the direction of the stream but the BJ retains control over what he or she eats. Ventriloquism, by which BJs mime the actions of their fans by directing food to the camera in a feeding motion and eating in their stead, is another technique that creates the illusion of a shared experience in one room.

A study conducted by Seoul National University found that within a two-year time frame (April 2017 to April 2019) the term "mukbang" was used in over 100,000 videos from YouTube. It reported that alleviating the feelings of loneliness associated with eating alone may be the primary reason for mukbang's popularity. In a pilot study from February 2022 on mukbang watching and mental health, psychologists lay the foundation for future investigation into the potential detriments of using mukbang, or virtual eating, as a substitute for social experiences. Another reason for mukbang viewing could be its potential sexual appeal. Researchers have argued that mukbangs can be viewed to satisfy eating-related fetishes, and have commented on the sexualized gaze brought about by watching hosts in such a private and intimate state. Other studies argue that individuals who watch mukbang do so for entertainment, as an escape from reality, or to get satisfaction from the ASMR aspects of mukbang such as eating sounds and sensations. Watching mukbang videos often creates an parasocial interaction between the mukbanger and the viewer, and it could also increase the likelihood of solo-dining of viewers.

=== Regional variation ===
In Eastern Europe, people gained a continuous interest in Mukbang between 2020 and 2025, as shown by the annual Mukbang search on YouTube. Countries such as Russia, Romania, and Hungary were leaders in the trend score, while Bulgaria, Belarus, Moldova, and Slovakia had the highest relative increases. Although the public interests in some countries remained low in 2025, Eastern Europe is catching up with the continental average, and its digital interest in Mukbang has not reached the regional ceiling.

Through a YouTube query analysis, researchers found that the ASMR and "General Mukbang" are the top two search categories in Eastern Europe, reflecting a strong, stable attraction in Mukbang's classic form. The search frequencies in categories such as "Korean Cuisine" and "Creators & Brands" are relatively low, which suggests that Mukbang's Korean origin did not have a strong presence in Eastern Europe viewers preferences, and there was minimal influence from influencers and branding.

The rapid increase in Mukbang's visibility in Eastern Europe indicates both a cultural shift from South Korea and an adaption to the sensory-focused media consumption style with slow pace, amplified sound, and visual aesthetics. This may be a post-pandemic phenomenon, where people are more isolated, or it may be due to the 18% increase in single-person households between 2015 and 2024, or a desire for relief from today's highly intense social media.

== Varieties ==
A popular sub-genre of the trend is "cook-bang" (쿡방) show, in which the streamer includes the preparation and cooking of the dishes featured as part of the show.

South Korean video game players have sometimes broadcast mukbang as breaks during their overall streams. The popularity of this practice among local users led the video game streaming service Twitch to begin trialing a dedicated "social eating" category in July 2016; a representative of the service stated that this category is not necessarily specific to mukbang, but would leave the concept open to interpretation by streamers within its guidelines.

== Monetization ==
Mukbangers incurring income from such videos can earn from advertising. This performance of eating can allow top broadcasters to earn as much as $10,000 a month which does not include sponsorships. Live-streaming platforms like AfreecaTV and Twitch allow viewers to send payments to their favorite streamers.

Creators can also earn income through endorsements, e-books and product reviews. Bethany Gaskin, under the name Bloveslife for her channel, has made over $1 million from advertising on her videos as reported by The New York Times. Popular mukbanger Soo Tang, also known as MommyTang, claimed that successful mukbangers can earn about $100,000 in a year.

== Positive effects ==
Mukbang can be used positively to promote healthy eating habits and appetites by enhancing taste experiences and relieving stress. This is beneficial to the group who are on bland diets, by preventing the usage of unhealthy food additives. However, the effect depends on the characteristics of the viewers. For example, being the main viewers, young individuals are easily affected. In addition, Mukbang can be an effective physical therapy for individuals suffering from anorexia nervosa, as it can stimulate food intake. Moreover, incorporating nutritional information of food and changing food types in Mukbang can help shape viewers' eating habits. Since Mukbang hosts' behaviors may trigger imitation, avoiding extreme eating behaviors, such as binge eating, can be beneficial to audience's eating behavior as well.

== Criticism ==
=== Promotion of unhealthy eating habits ===
In July 2018, the South Korean government announced that it would create and regulate mukbang guidelines by launching the "National Obesity Management Comprehensive Measures". The Ministry of Health and Welfare announced the measures, which were intended to address binge eating and harm to the public health caused by mukbang. Criticisms were levied against the ministry: the Blue House petition board received about 40 petitions against mukbang regulations, which maintained arguments such as "there is no correlation between mukbang and binge eating" and "the government is infringing on individual freedom."

A study, which investigated the popularity of mukbang and its health impacts on the public, analyzed media coverage, articles, and YouTube video content related to "mukbang" and concluded that people who frequently watch mukbang may be more susceptible to adopting poor eating habits. In a survey involving 380 non-nutrition majors at a university in Gyeonggi Province, and their tendencies to watch mukbang and its close variant, cookbang, a significant 29.1% of frequent mukbang-watchers self-diagnosed negative habits, such as increased intake of processed and delivered foods or eating out. Mukbang has also been credited as a dietary restriction device for curbing food cravings and excessive watching may be correlated with the exacerbation or relapse of eating disorders.

In 2024 CNN wrote an article where they talked about the concerns associated with Mukbang content. They highlighted a study taken in January of 2020 to demonstrate the reasons for concerns behind these popular Mukbang videos. The study was based off "5952 YouTube videos, 5265 news articles, and a study of 1200 people in Korea." The study demonstrated that the content that showed negative and potentially harmful habits such as "overeating", "consuming dangerous food" and "irritating foods" or "dangerous amounts of food" had gained more views compared to content that didn't present these eating habits. And the concern is that viewing this content could be damaging for viewers especially for viewers who are already struggling with food related issues such as someone with "a restrictive eating disorder could use the videos to fulfil the sense of eating without eating any food said Suzanne Fisher"

A netnographic analysis of popular mukbang videos on YouTube revealed a significant number of viewer comments expressing fascination with the ability to remain thin after ingesting large amounts of unhealthy foods, a major subcategory of which attempted to explain this phenomenon by citing intense physical exercise by the hosts, physiological quirks such as a "fast metabolism", or by attributing it to the host's Asian ethnicity. BJs' experiences with fat shaming and their underweight counterparts' with speculation for purging and engaging in other unhealthy eating habits off-camera were also noted.

In 2019, Ukrainian-born American mukbanger Nicholas Perry, known as Nikocado Avocado, shared that the amount of binge eating from mukbang has taken a toll on his health, leading to issues such as erectile dysfunction, frequent diarrhea, sleep apnea, mobility problems and weight gain.

In 2023, Indian mukbanger Ashifa, known as Ashifa ASMR, the biggest mukbanger in India, shared that the food shown in mukbang videos cannot be consumed all in one go. She eats the food in multiple sittings and edits the video clips into a continuous video. According to her, this fact has been disclosed in her disclaimers as a caution to the viewers to prevent unhealthy eating habits.

In 2024, the Philippine Department of Health considered banning mukbang videos in the Philippines following the death of a content creator in Iligan City after a stroke.

In August 2026, Chinese mukbanger Chen Ziyi, known as Yingying, died after sharing that she had been hospitalized due to low potassium levels, related to the practice of purging.

=== Food waste ===
Excessive amounts of food can be consumed and wasted while producing mukbang videos. To prevent weight gain or other health risks as a result of overeating, some mukbangers chew food and then spit it out, but edit their videos to remove the spitting to create the false impression that a large volume of food has been consumed. In 2020, South Korean mukbanger Moon Bok Hee, from the channel Eat With Boki, was criticized for allegedly spitting out food after viewers noted dubious editing practices in her videos.

In 2020, General Secretary of the Chinese Communist Party Xi Jinping launched the 'Clean Plate' campaign, calling on the nation to guard against food waste. This campaign prompted state-run media outlets such as CCTV to run reports critical of mukbangers. Users on several Chinese apps received warnings about their mukbang contents and faced an influx of negative comments. Later, Douyin promised to have stricter verification on food-related videos. Other media platforms, including Bilibili and Kuaishou, have encouraged not wasting food.

=== Incidents of alleged animal cruelty ===
Several mukbang streamers have received criticism for alleged cruelty to live sea creatures before and during their consumption in their mukbang videos. One streamer, by the name of Ssoyoung, has been accused of inflicting excess harm to creatures such as fish, sharks, crabs, squid, and octopuses. In one instance, Ssoyoung poured table salt onto a basin of live eels. In another, squid that Ssoyoung poured soy sauce on were observed moving, but this was perhaps the result of involuntary movement due to salt interacting with the nerves of dead squid.

=== Health impacts ===
==== Eating disorders ====
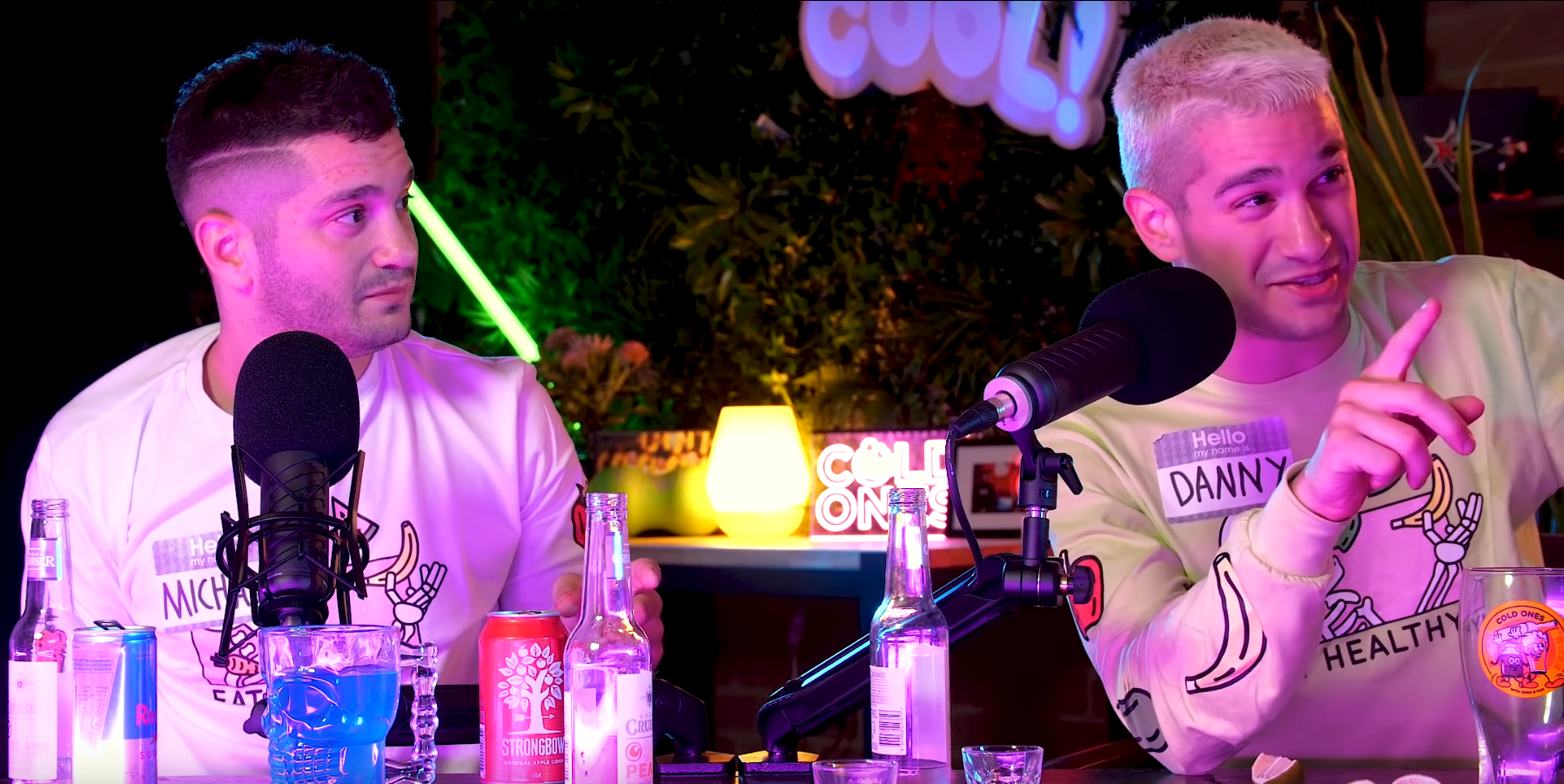
YouTubers drinking alcoholic drinks on "Cold Ones"

A study in 2021 which addressed mukbang and the effect of influencers' food consumption on their viewers showed that engaging in "problematic mukbang watching" was associated with eating disorders and with internet addiction. In addition, academics and dietitians added that mukbangers and their viewers often have a bad relationship with their eating habits, and its popularity only serves to further encourage such behaviors.

==== Alcohol consumption ====
A sulbang (술방, pronounced [sulpaŋ]) or eating show with alcohol videos can be watched by anyone, including minors, which may inadvertently stimulate alcohol consumption among teenagers.

A study investigating the association between watching mukbang and cookbang and adolescent alcohol use demonstrated solid proportional relationship between the exposure to mukbang/cookbang and the risk of alcohol consumption. A higher association is seen in adolescents who are female, from lower economic backgrounds, have less stress, and are overweight. This may due to different levels of susceptibility in social media, regulatory enforcements, and social exclusion.

==== Depression symptoms ====
According to a study investigating mukbang watching and depression among Korean adults aged 20–64 years old, more frequent Mukbang watching was associated with increased odds of depressive symptoms. More specifically, moderate or frequent mukbang watching (watching 1–2 and ≥ 3 times a week) is related to moderate depression, and frequent Mukbang watching is associated with severe depression symptoms. This positive relationship between the frequency of mukbang watching and depression holds true across strata of gender, age group, drinking status, and frequency of overeating or binge eating.

==== Body image ====
Findings on whether viewing mukbang have an impact on body image are mixed. One study suggested a potential association with body image. Some studies indicated that more frequent viewing of mukbang content is linked to poorer body image, while others reported context-dependent results. Viewing mukbang videos has also been associated with how individuals perceive their body shape, though this perception may be due to cultural or societal norms, and are further amplified through the social media exposure. Moreover, variations in viewing patterns, such as frequency and duration, may influence outcomes differently. Scholars have suggested that mechanisms similar to those identified in appearance-related media, such as social comparison, may also play a role in shaping body image in the context of food-related media, though further research is needed.

==== Psychological interpretations ====
Researchers studying Mukbang's effect in psychic dynamics have found that watching without eating can create conflicts between desire and prohibition, recalling the role of fantasy in the regulation of drive in psychoanalytic theory. Another core finding is that viewers may develop an identificatory relationship with the Mukbang host, wavering between identification and rejection. Some people experience sensory soothing, while others may treat this as a test for bodily limits. This ambivalence, between fascination and repulsion, is, in psychoanalytic terms, understood as an intrinsic aspect of jouissance. Furthermore, Mukbang functions as a masturbatory dispositif, reinforcing a loop of visual enjoyment, shaped by isolation, habitual viewing, and the regulation of desire. Participants tend to oscillate between excitement and collapse, which corresponds to the classic libidinal cycles. Viewers gain sensory satisfaction through indirect excessive consumption performed by the Mukbanger, indicating Mukbang's nature of displaced performance of oral gratification through a digital other.

=== Mukbang bans ===
==== China ====
In 2021, China passed an anti-food waste law, which, among other things, bans the streaming of filming or sharing mukbang videos. Chinese leader Xi Jinping called such acts of food waste a "distressing" problem that threatens China's food security. Fines of up to $16,000 also were imposed on TV stations and media houses that produce and broadcast them.

==== Philippines ====
In 2024, following the death of Dongz Apatan, a mukbang vlogger, the Department of Health Philippines proposed the banning of mukbang videos, which was later reduced to a regulation on content creators to make videos based on the healthier "Pinggang Pinoy" food guide rather than to infringe on their right to freedom of speech and expression.

== See also ==
- Competitive eating – Activity in which participants compete to consume large quantities of food
- Cooking show – Television genre that presents food preparation
- Food competition – Competition between food or drinks
- Food porn – Glorified visual presentation of food
