= Nine Lives Media =

UK television production company

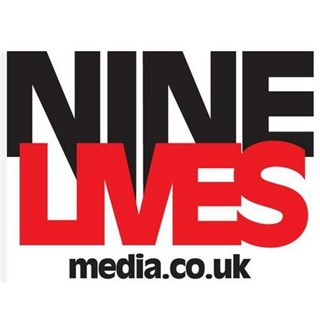
- Industry: Television
- Founded: September 2007
- Headquarters: Manchester, UK
- Key people: Cat Lewis, CEO; Mike Lewis, Joint Creative Director & Executive Producer Steve Boulton, Executive Producer
- Website: www.ninelivesmedia.co.uk

Nines Lives Media is a Manchester-based television production company in the United Kingdom. It was formed in September 2007 by Cat Lewis. The company makes a range of television programs including documentaries, factual entertainment formats, drama, children's programs, and current affairs for all major UK broadcasters, as well as some American channels. Nine Lives Media is one of two companies with an output deal for Channel 4's current affairs strand, Dispatches.

Nine Lives Media has won two BAFTAs, a national RTS Award, an International Emmy, and several North England awards. In January 2016, Nine Lives Media was named one of the 50 most creative companies in England by Creative England.
