= List of Indian podcasts =

The following is a list of Indian podcasts that are either created by or about Indian people.

== List ==
Podcast	Year	Starring, Narrator(s), or Host(s)	Produced by	Ref
Figuring Out	2020–present	Raj Shamani	Independent	
The Ranveer Show	2019–present	Ranveer Allahbadia		
Hidden Files	2019	Amit Dubey	Red FM (India)	
Ek Choti Si Horror Story			Red FM (India)	
WTF is	2023–present	Nikhil Kamath		
Trial By Error: The Aarushi Files	2016	Nishita Jha	Arre	
Podbharti	2007–present	Debashish Chakrabarty and Shashi Singh	Independent	
Kathay Kathay Jibon Podcast	2026–present	Pranab Kr Nath	Spotify Studios	
Death, Lies and Cyanide	2020	Sashi Kumar	Spotify Studios and Asiaville	
Kahani Suno	2018–Present	Sameer Goswami	Independent	
The Desi Crime Podcast	2020–present	Aryaan Misra and Aishwarya Singh	Desi Studios	
On The Contrary		Arun Maira	India Development Review	
Darr Ka Raaz with Dr. Phobia		Rajesh Khera	Spotify Studios	
The Big Indian Ghotala			Spotify Studios	
Shudh Desi Gay				
About What You Say	2021	Garfield Dsouza	Garfield Dsouza	
Indian Noir	2018–present	Nikesh Murali	Independent	
The Tastes of India	2015–present			
The RJ Balaji Podcast		RJ Balaji	Spotify Studios	
Andar Ki Baat by Amit Tandon		Amit Tandon	Spotify Studios	
Maed in India	2015–present			
Wordy Wordpecker	2018	Rachel Lopez	IVM Podcasts	
22 Yarns With Gaurav Kapur		Gaurav Kapur		
Bhaskar Bose	2019 - present	Mantra Mugdh and Shadaab Hashmi	MnM Talkies	
SynTalk	2014-present	Jyoti Narula Ranjan	Independent	
Cyrus Says		Cyrus	IVM Podcasts	
Kaan Masti				
The Real Food Podcast	2016–present			
Marbles Lost & Found	2018–present		IVM Podcasts	
Kanooni Kisse	2021–present	Abhas Mishra	Independent	
The Intersection				
दोन बायका गप्पा ऐका Donn Bayka Gappa Aika	2022	Aparna Dixit and Avanti Damle	IVM Podcasts	
The Cārvāka Podcast	2017	Kushal Mehra	Independent	
That's So Hindu	2020		Hindu American Foundation	
Sunday Suspense	2009		Mirchi Bangla	

== See also ==
- Podcasting in India
- Media of India
- Radio in India
