= There Will Be Tomorrow =

- Directed by: Bhushan Gaur
- Written by: Bhushan Gaur
- Produced by: Bhushan Gaur
- Starring: Sahil Salathia; Nimisha Mehta; Shishir Sharma; Mangala Kenkre; Preiti Mamgain
- Cinematography: Suman Kumar Sahu
- Edited by: Bhushan Gaur; Ravi Khote; Snigdha Roy
- Music by: Jayanta Pathak; Shishir Chausalkar
- Release date: 2016
- Country: India
- Language: English

There Will Be Tomorrow is a 2016 English language social awareness film, written and directed by Bhushan Gaur and starring Sahil Salathia and Nimisha Mehta as a young idyllic couple whose lives are rocked when one of them mysteriously contracts HIV. The film follows their struggles to have a baby that is free of disease.

== Cast ==
- Sahil Salathia as Adam Alfredo
- Nimisha Mehta as Annie Alfredo
- Shishir Sharma as Dr. V Kumar
- Preiti Mamgain as Amaira Pinto
- Mangala Kenkre as Dr. Ivana Bell

== Development ==
The idea for the film came when Gaur saw a photograph of a man with HIV holding a baby. "It was a beautiful picture and led me to research more on the subject. Several doctors and scientists were consulted while developing the screenplay".

Gaur further explained:

The style of narration is unusual; it jumps forward and backward, and the multiple timelines are visually demarcated. The way the film is shot is unique: a few single takes merge into one another. It is entertaining while also imparting information. No film previously spoke about HIV patients having their own uninfected babies.

== Reception ==
The film, which was showcased at the HIV Congress in Goa, has garnered a lot of positive reviews. Praising the film, The Times of India wrote that "while there have been many awareness generation films, this one specifically educates people of the possibility of HIV victims having their own uninfected babies. The film addresses to the bigger motive".

Purnima Sriram of The Indian Express hailed the film as a research-backed movie that nails it, while Shraddha Shirodkar of DNA India observed that it is "an attempt to debunk myths surrounding HIV".

The Navhind Times noted that "There Will Be Tomorrow aims at helping society become mentally and emotionally strong. To educate using the medium of film, the director has used modern styles of narration".

O Heraldo's Dolcy D'Cruz profiled the film, saying that it "has been shot in a very innovative style, using natural light on Ronin device and hand held camera".
