= Auritra Ghosh =

Indian actress and dancer

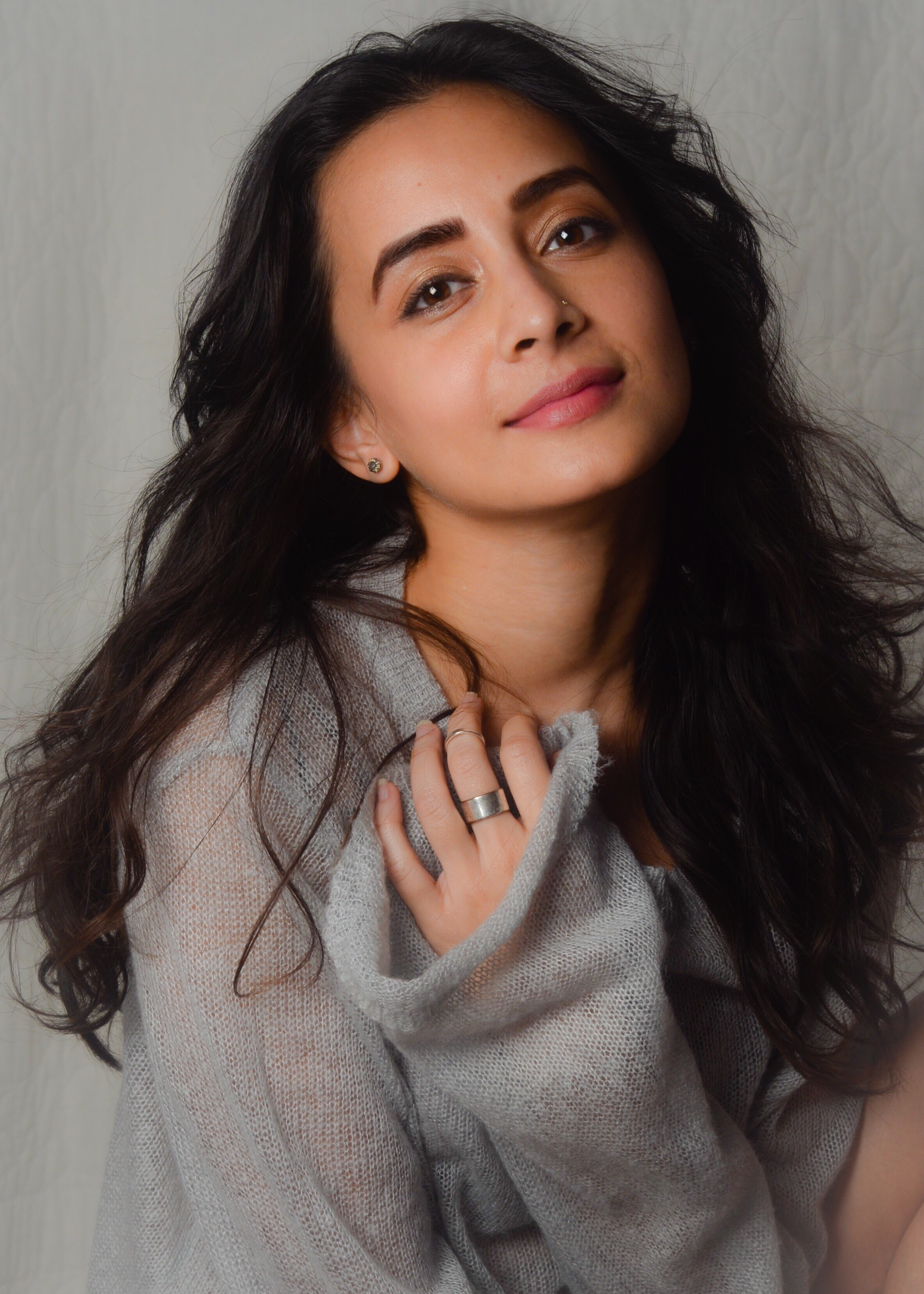
- Auritra Ghosh
- Born: Jamshedpur, Jharkhand, India
- Occupations: Actress, dance and movement artist, theatre artist
- Years active: 2011 – present

Auritra Ghosh is an Indian actress and dancer. She is known for Indian films like Love Breakups Zindagi, M Cream and Dharam Sankat Mein. In recent times, she has garnered recognition for her work in various web series like the award-winning digital sci-fi thriller A.I.SHA My Virtual Girlfriend and Y-Films production Ladies' Room.

Ghosh was the face behind the Google Search: Reunion ad campaign. She received widespread, individual appreciation for her nuanced role in the ad-film.

== Career ==
Auritra started her career in the performing arts at the age of 16. Brought up in Delhi, her Bengali lineage along with her passion for creativity, provided for a great base to develop her skills in performing arts.

In 2001, she joined The Danceworx - Performing Arts Academy to further complement her earlier training in Kathak, where she trained in jazz, ballet, modern and contemporary dance. By 2002, she was a full-time instructor and choreographer with the academy picking up training along the way from renowned dance teachers across the world and even represented India at the Fontys Academy's International Dance Festival held in Tilburg, Netherlands in 2007.

She has performed in many theatre productions, including an adaptation of the award-winning play August: Osage County directed by Lillete Dubey. In 2017, she choreographed and performed in a Motley Production an adaptation of the renowned The Threepenny Opera as a part of Aadyam - a theatre initiative by Aditya Birla Group. Currently, she's part of the exciting cast of 'STAND UP: a serious play about comedy' - an Akvarious Theatre Production.

Auritra has also acted in many short films like the MTV Films' production Shaadi Vaadi And All That, Yesterday starring Kunaal Roy Kapur and Happy Anniversary by Pramod Films.

She started a venture called 'Pause and Effect' to curate performing arts and wellness events across the country.

== Filmography ==
=== Films ===
Year	Film	Role	Notes
2019	Good News		
2018	High Jack	Anjali	
2016	M Cream	Meghna (Maggie)	
2015	Dharam Sankat Mein	Shraddha	
2015	The Strangers	Isha	Short-film
2015	Boring: A Day in the Life		
2013	All the Lost Souls	Saira Sethi	
2012	Swen	Riya	
2011	Love Breakups Zindagi	Gayatri	
2025	WingMan (The Universal Irony of Love)	Shikha	

=== Television & Web ===
Year	Film	Role	Channel
2019	Holycross	Dr. Rhea	Sony Liv
2018	Love on the Rocks - Episode: Swipe Right	Meera	MensXP
2017	Siya	Siya	Pocket Films
Post-production	The Good Karma Hospital Season 3, Episode 1	Manisha	Tiger Aspect Productions
Post-production	A.I.SHA My Virtual Girlfriend Season 3	Kriti Khanna /?	Arre
2017	A.I.SHA My Virtual Girlfriend Season 2	Kriti Khanna	Arre
2016	A.I.SHA My Virtual Girlfriend Season 1	Kriti Khanna	Arre
2016	Ladies Room	Naima Sen	Y Films
2014	Shaadi Vaadi And All That	Aahana Kapadia	Television Film
