= 2008 Noida double murder case =

Unsolved murders of teenage girl and domestic worker

Aarushi-Hemraj double murder case
- Aarushi Talwar (left), Hemraj Banjade (right)
- Location: L-32, Sector-25, Noida, Uttar Pradesh, India
- Date: 15–16 May 2008; 00:00 to 06:00
- Attack type: Homicide
- Deaths: 2
- Victims: Aarushi Talwar and Hemraj Banjade

The 2008 Noida double murder case refers to the unsolved murders of 13-year-old girl Aarushi Talwar and 45-year-old man Yam Prasad "Hemraj" Banjade, a live-in domestic worker employed by her family. The two were killed on the night of 15–16 May 2008 at Aarushi's home in Noida, India. The case aroused public interest as a whodunit story. The sensational media coverage, which included salacious allegations against Aarushi and the suspects, was criticised by many as a trial by media.

When Aarushi's body was discovered in her bedroom on 16 May, Hemraj was missing at the time, and was considered the main suspect. The next day, Hemraj's partially decomposed body was discovered on the terrace. The police were heavily criticized for failing to secure the crime scene immediately. After ruling out former domestic servants of the family, the police treated Aarushi's parents—Dr. Rajesh Talwar and Dr. Nupur Talwar—as the prime suspects. The police suspected that Rajesh had murdered the victims after finding them in an "objectionable" position, or because Rajesh's alleged extra-marital affair had led to his blackmail by Hemraj and a confrontation with Aarushi. The Talwars' family and friends accused the police of framing the Talwars in order to cover up the botched-up investigation. The case was then transferred to the CBI, which exonerated the parents and suspected the Talwars' assistant Krishna Thadarai and two domestic servants—Rajkumar and Vijay Mandal. Based on the 'narco' interrogation conducted on the three men, the CBI assumed that they had killed Aarushi after an attempted sexual assault, and Hemraj for being a witness. The CBI was accused of using dubious methods to extract a confession, and all three men were released for lack of evidence.

In 2009, the CBI handed over the investigation to a new team, which recommended closing the case. Based on circumstantial evidence, it named Rajesh Talwar as the sole suspect, but refused to charge him because of critical gaps in evidence. The parents opposed the closure report, calling CBI's suspicion of Rajesh Talwar baseless. Subsequently, a special CBI court rejected the CBI's claim that there was not enough evidence, and ordered proceedings against the Talwars. In November 2013, the parents were convicted and sentenced to Life imprisonment, amid criticism that the judgment was based on weak evidence. The Talwars successfully challenged the decision in the Allahabad High Court, which acquitted them in 2017. The case remains unsolved.

== Background ==
Aarushi Talwar (24 May 1994 – 16 May 2008) was a 13-year-old student at the Delhi Public School. She was the daughter of a dentist couple, Dr. Rajesh Talwar and Dr. Nupur Talwar. The family lived in an apartment in Sector 25 (Jalvayu Vihar) of Noida, Uttar Pradesh, India. Rajesh and Nupur practiced together at their clinic in Sector 27 of Noida. They also saw patients at the Fortis Hospital, where Rajesh headed the dental department. In addition, Rajesh taught at the ITS Dental College in Greater Noida. Anita and Praful Durrani, another dentist couple and close family friends of the Talwars, lived in the same city. The couple shared the Noida clinic with the Talwars: Rajesh and Anita worked at the clinic in the mornings (9 am–12 pm), while Praful and Nupur worked there in the evenings (5 pm–7 pm). The Durranis and the Talwars also shared a clinic in Hauz Khas area of Delhi.

Yam Prasad Banjade, better known as Hemraj, was the Talwars' live-in domestic worker and cook. He belonged to Dharapani village in the Arghakhanchi District of Nepal.

=== Events preceding the murders ===
The murders on the night of 15–16 May 2008 were preceded by the following events:

Before 9 pm (15 May)

- On 15 May 2008, Nupur Talwar worked at her clinic from 9:00 am – 1:00 pm. She picked up Aarushi from school at 1:30 pm and returned to their Jalvayu Vihar apartment. Nupur's sister-in-law Vandana Talwar (wife of Rajesh's brother Dinesh Talwar) joined them for lunch. Then Nupur and Vandana left, while Aarushi stayed at home. Nupur worked at the Fortis Hospital from 4:30 pm to 7:00 pm. She returned to the apartment around 7:30 pm.
- Rajesh Talwar taught at the ITS Dental College from 8:45 am to 3:30 pm and then attended patients at the clinic until 8:30 pm.

9 pm – 10 pm

- Rajesh and his driver Umesh Sharma returned to Jalvayu Vihar around 9:30 pm.
- Sharma dropped Rajesh in front of the apartment building and drove away to park the car at Nupur's parents' house, which was within walking distance.
- Sharma returned to the Talwar residence around 9:40 pm to hand over the car keys and Rajesh's bag to Hemraj Banjade, who had cooked dinner for the family.
- Sharma saw Nupur and Aarushi near the dining table and Rajesh coming out of his bedroom. He was the last known outsider to see Aarushi and Hemraj alive.

10 pm – 11 pm

- According to the Talwars, after the dinner, they went to Aarushi's room and gave her a Sony DSC-W130 digital camera. The camera had arrived earlier that day via courier and had been received by Hemraj. Rajesh originally planned to give it to Aarushi on her birthday (24 May), but Nupur persuaded Rajesh to give it to Aarushi that day as an early birthday surprise.
- Aarushi clicked several photographs of herself and her parents, the last one at 10:10 pm.
- Subsequently, Aarushi's parents retired to their room, while Aarushi remained in her room.

11 pm – 12 am

- According to the parents, around 11 pm, Rajesh asked Nupur to switch on the internet router, which was in Aarushi's room. When Nupur came to Aarushi's room, the teenager was reading Chetan Bhagat's The 3 Mistakes of My Life. Nupur switched on the router and returned to her own room.
- Around this time, Rajesh answered a call from the US on the landline phone (kept in the couple's room). This indicates that the ringer was not silent.
- Rajesh then surfed some stock market and dentistry websites, and sent an e-mail. He visited an e-mail site at 11:41:53 pm, which is when the desktop and the laptop show the last internet usage.

After 12 am (16 May)

- Around midnight, Aarushi's friend Anmol tried calling her on her mobile as well as the Talwar residence's landline. The calls were not answered. Around 12:30 am, he sent her an SMS message: This message was not received by Aarushi's phone.
- The Internet router was used for the last time at 12:08 am. Based on this, CBI inferred that Rajesh was online until 12:08 am.
- The exact sequence of events between midnight and 6:00 am could not be determined by the investigators with certainty (conjecture). According to their post-mortem reports, Aarushi and Hemraj were killed between 12:00 am and 1:00 am.

=== The apartment ===
The 1300 sq. ft. apartment had 3 bedrooms (including servants' room), a drawing-dining room and a servants' quarters, where Hemraj slept. Rajesh and Nupur slept in the master bedroom, while Aarushi slept in an adjacent room. Hemraj's room had a separate entry from outside the apartment; it also opened into the apartment from inside.

The entrance to the Talwars' apartment at Jalvayu Vihar had three doors: the outermost grill gate, a middle mesh door, and the innermost wooden door. The middle door and the wooden door were attached to the same frame Hemraj's room had two doors - one door opened inside the apartment, and the other door was located between the two grill doors. The Talwars had the outermost gate removed a year after the murders.

== Discovery of Aarushi's body ==
On 16 May 2008, the family's maid Bharati Mandal (35) rang their doorbell around 6 am. She had been employed six days earlier. Every day, Hemraj Banjade would open the door for her, as Nupur and Rajesh were late risers, but this time, nobody opened the door even after she rang a second time. She later stated that she tried pushing the outermost gate, but it did not open.

After Bharati rang the doorbell a third time, Nupur opened the innermost wooden door. Speaking through the mesh of the middle grill door, she told Bharati that this door was locked from outside. She asked Bharati about the whereabouts of Hemraj. When Bharati said that she had no idea, Nupur remarked that Hemraj must have gone outside to fetch milk and must have locked the door from outside. She asked Bharati to wait outside until Hemraj returned. Bharati did not want to wait and asked Nupur to throw the duplicate keys. Nupur asked her to go downstairs so that she could throw the keys to her from the balcony.

Nupur then called Hemraj's mobile phone, but the call was abruptly cut. When she tried calling him again, the phone appeared to have been switched off. When Bharati reached downstairs, Nupur asked her to go back and check if the door was just latched, not locked. Bharati insisted that Nupur throw the keys anyway, so that she wouldn't have to take the stairs again, in case the door was locked. Nupur then threw the keys down to Bharati.

According to the Talwars, by this time, Rajesh also woke up. He entered the living room and saw a near-empty Scotch whisky bottle on the dining table, which surprised him. He asked Nupur who had kept the bottle there, and then, alarmed, asked her to check Aarushi's room. Aarushi's room had a self-locking door, and it would generally be locked. It could be opened only from inside or from outside with a key. But the couple found it unlocked on that morning. When they entered the room, they saw Aarushi's dead body lying on her bed. Rajesh started screaming, while Nupur remained silent (due to shock, according to her).

Meanwhile, Bharati returned to the outermost gate: she pushed it, and it opened without the key. She found that the middle door was latched, but not locked. She opened the latch and walked in. When she entered the apartment, she saw Rajesh and Nupur crying. Nupur asked her to come inside Aarushi's room. Bharati stood at the entrance of the room, as Nupur walked inside. Aarushi's body lay on her bed; it was covered with a flannel blanket. Nupur pulled the blanket, and Bharati saw that Aarushi's throat was slit. Both the parents blamed Hemraj Banjade for Aarushi's murder in front of the maid. Bharati walked out of the apartment to inform the neighbours. She returned to the house and asked the Talwars if they wanted her to do the daily household chores. When they said no, she moved on to work in other households.

The Talwars called their family and friends. Puneesh Rai Tandon, a neighbour who lived one floor below the Talwars, asked the Jalvayu Vihar security guard Virendra Singh to inform the police. By the time the police arrived, there were 15 people in the living room and 5-6 people in the Talwars' bedroom; only Aarushi's room was vacant. The crime scene had been "completely trampled upon". The story of a murder in an affluent neighbourhood also attracted media attention, with personnel gathered around the house by 8 am.

== Hemraj Banjade as the suspect ==
On 16 May, the missing servant Hemraj Banjade was the prime suspect. In his police complaint, Rajesh blamed Hemraj for his daughter's murder. He repeatedly told the police to pursue Hemraj instead of wasting time in the apartment, and offered them ₹ 25,000 to rush to Hemraj's native village in Nepal. The police suspected that Hemraj entered Aarushi's room in an inebriated state after consuming Scotch whisky, and tried to sexually assault her. When she resisted, he killed her with a kukri (a Nepali knife). The police announced a reward of ₹ 20,000 for tips leading to his capture.

Aarushi's body was taken for post-mortem around 8:30 am by two Uttar Pradesh Police constables. Rajesh's brother Dinesh Talwar, his driver Umesh Sharma and his childhood friend Ajay Chadha accompanied the constables. Around 1 pm, the body was brought home and placed on ice slabs in the living room. It was taken for cremation at the Antim Niwas crematorium around 4 pm. According to the Talwars, who were later accused of being in a hurry to cremate the body, it was decomposing fast, and the family elders were pushing for cremation. In addition, the police confirmed that the body was not needed for any further examination.

The police later alleged that the Talwars' domestic staff showed undue haste in cleaning Aarushi's room. In the Talwars' defence, their compounder Vikas Sethi told the court that he had received the permission to clean the house from the police personnel and a female constable present on the crime scene.

A part of Aarushi's blood-stained mattress was cut out and sent to the forensics lab along with her pillow, bed sheet and clothes. Vikas Sethi later testified that he, along with three others, tried to dump the remaining part of the mattress on the terrace, but found it locked. An old lady then told him to put the mattress on the neighbouring terrace. Rajesh's driver Sharma then asked the neighbour Puneesh Tandon for the key to his terrace. Earlier, at 4 pm also, Sharma had asked Tandon for the key, saying that he needed to dump the ice brought for Aarushi's body. This time, Tandon opened the terrace himself. Sharma, Sethi and two others dragged the mattress to his terrace. Tandon then locked the terrace door. None of them noticed the body of Hemraj, which was lying on the adjacent terrace, separated by a grilled wall.

According to CBI, when the post-mortem report was being written between 3 p.m. and 6 p.m. on 16 May, a series of telephone conversations had happened between Dinesh Talwar, Dr. Sushil Chaudhury (Dinesh's friend and the chairman of the ICARE Eye Hospital) and K K Gautam (retired DSP). K K Gautam, while deposing at the CBI court later in 2012, stated that Chaudhury had requested him to get any references to a sexual assault removed from the post-mortem report, but he refused to oblige. He told the court that he had mentioned this incident to the first CBI team, but they left out this information from their records.

== Discovery of Hemraj's body ==
On the morning of 17 May, the visitors to the Talwars' house noticed some bloodstains on the terrace door handle. Rajesh's former colleagues Rajiv Kumar Varshney and Rohit Kochhar later told the police that they saw bloodstains on the terrace door, its lock and the staircase leading to the terrace. While visiting the Talwars' house, Varshney had taken the stairs to the terrace. However, several other witnesses testified that they had not noticed any bloodstains on the staircase in the morning. These witnesses included several police officers, Umesh Sharma, Puneesh Rai Tandon, Bharati Mandal and Vikas Sethi. Thus, the bloodstains might have been left by the group that tried to take Aarushi's mattress to the Talwars' terrace.

Kocchar stated that the bloodstains on the terrace door were brought to the attention of a police constable named Akhilesh Kumar. Praful Durrani, who also visited the house, claimed that the policeman initially dismissed the spot on the terrace door as rust, and was also dismissive of the bloodstains on the floor. According to Varshney, the police told him that the killer must have tried to escape through or hide the weapon on the terrace, but returned after finding it locked. Eventually, the police were persuaded to investigate the terrace, but they could not get the key to the terrace door. Rohit Kochhar later testified that when a policeman asked Rajesh for the terrace key, he "went into the house and did not come out for a long time." Varshney told the court that Rajesh went "towards staircase and immediately returned and went inside the house". Rajesh later stated that he does not have exact recollection of what happened at that time, but he insisted that he never stopped the investigators from visiting any part of the house. Ultimately, the police were unable to open the door and let it remain locked until the next day. SP Mahesh Mishra testified that he had asked for the terrace door to be opened on 16 May. However, his subordinates told him that Rajesh Talwar couldn't find the key and they couldn't find a mechanic to break open the door. He also stated that he had filed a report on this "carelessness" with the SSP Noida.

On the morning of 17 May, Rajesh and Nupur Talwar left for Haridwar to immerse Aarushi's ashes in the Ganges as per the Hindu custom. Several visitors continued to arrive at the Talwars' house (which was being managed by Dinesh Talwar) with their condolences. These visitors included retired police officer K.K. Gautam, who had been requested by Sushil Chaudhury to come to the Talwars' house. After arriving at the house, Gautam examined the rooms of Aarushi and Hemraj. Dinesh then showed him the blood stains on the terrace door handle. According to Gautam, Dinesh requested he get the terrace door unlocked. Gautam then called SP Mahesh Mishra, and told him that the lock needed to be broken. Mishra promised that he would himself visit the crime scene, and meanwhile, sent the station officer Dataram Nauneria to the apartment. The key to the terrace was still missing. Anita Durrani asked the Talwars' neighbour Puneesh Tandon if he had a duplicate key to the Talwars' terrace, to which Tandon replied in the negative. Ultimately, Dataram Nauneria broke open the lock. As the group entered the terrace, they saw bloody drag marks. A body "in advanced stage of putrefaction" was discovered lying in a pool of blood at about 10:30 am.

Dinesh Talwar couldn't identify the newly discovered body, and called Rajesh and Nupur (who were on their way to Haridwar), asking them to return home. Meanwhile, SP Mahesh Mishra also reached the spot. When the couple arrived at the home, Nupur didn't enter the house: she sat in the car with Aarushi's ashes, as she considered it inauspicious to take the ashes inside. Rajesh went upstairs to identify the body. He told the police that he couldn't be sure that the body was that of Hemraj, due to the injuries and the decomposition. Later, a friend of Hemraj identified the body as his.

Rajesh and Nupur later resumed their journey to Haridwar and returned the same day. At Haridwar, Rajesh entered the time of Aarushi's death as 2 am in the priest's records. An autopsy of Hemraj's body was conducted at night by Dr. Naresh Raj.

== Evidence gathered ==
The UP police did not cordon off the crime scene immediately, and many people, including the media, were freely roaming in the apartment without any permission when the forensic team arrived to gather evidence. According to the CBI team, 90% of the evidence at the crime scene was destroyed due to the police's negligence.

=== The injuries ===
According to their post-mortem reports, both Aarushi Talwar and Hemraj died between 12 am and 1 am. Both had been first attacked with a heavy blunt weapon, which caused a "U/V-shaped" scar and resulted in their deaths. Then, their throats were slit with a sharp weapon. There was no sign of asphyxia.

Injuries on the victims' bodies
| | Aarushi Talwar | Hemraj Banjade |
|---|---|---|
| Blunt injury | The blunt injury was on Aarushi's forehead, above the left eye. The CBI closure report also mentions an injury on the occipital bone, but according to the Talwars' lawyers, the only injury mentioned by the post-mortem report is one on the left parietal bone. The blow had caused a deep cut of the size 4 cm x 3 cm, and a blood clot of the size 8 cm x 2 cm in her brain. | The blunt injury was on the back of Hemraj's head. |
| Incised neck wounds | The incision on Aarushi's neck measured 14 cm x 6 cm. The blood had drained from the neck cuts, and there was no arterial spurting, indicating that these wounds were caused after the blunt injuries. | Hemraj had identical cuts on the neck at the same position. |

Weapon used for inflicting the blunt injury

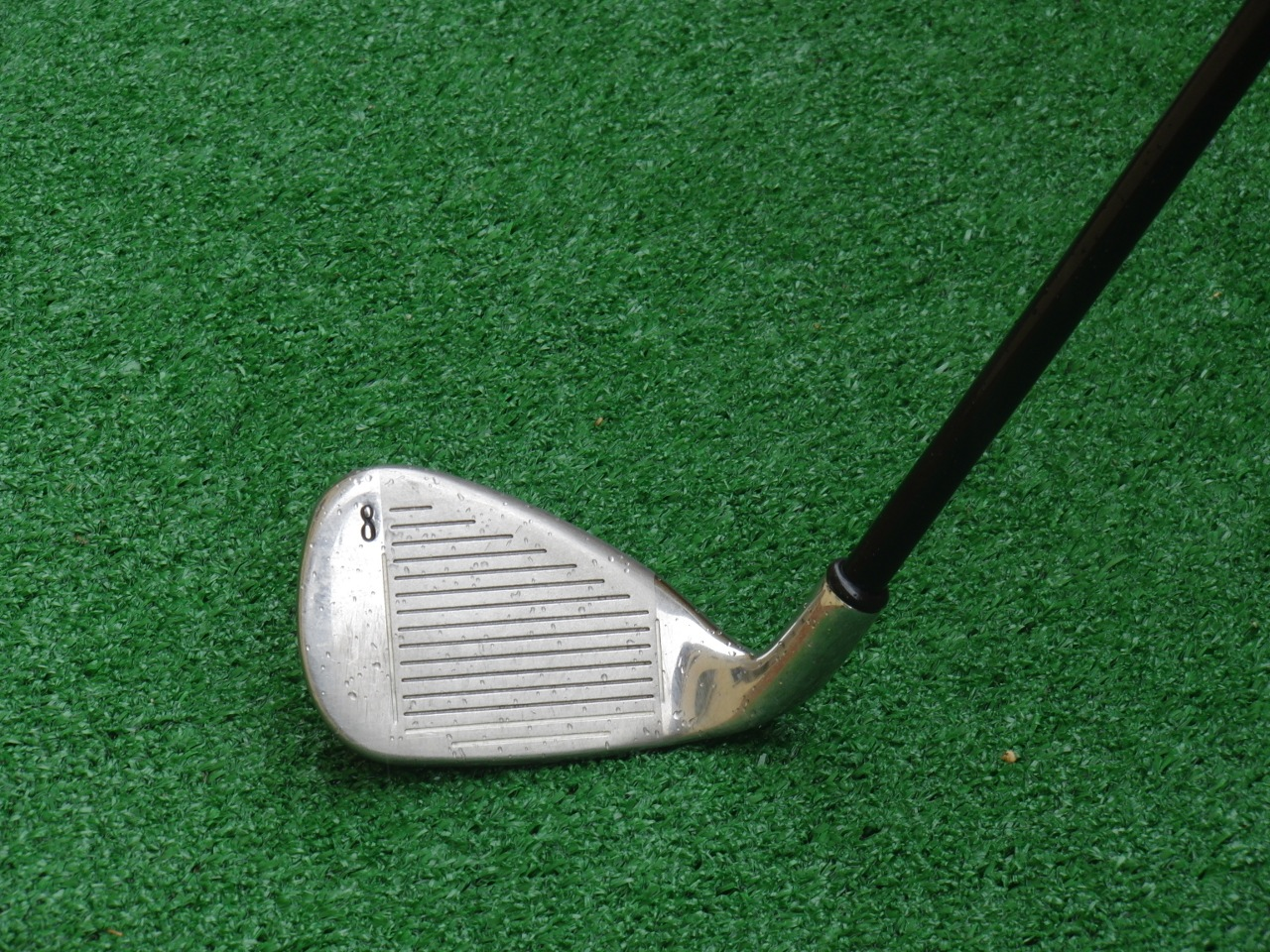
A typical golf club (Picture used for representational purpose only)

In May 2008, the forensic scientists stated that Aarushi was first assaulted with "a heavy sharp-edged weapon". The first hit on the forehead resulted in her death within two minutes, as indicated by the blood clot size.

In 2012, after Aarushi's parents were charged with the murder, the CBI claimed that according to the experts, the "dimensions of the striking distance" of one of Rajesh's golf clubs was identical to the dimensions of the injuries found on the bodies. Dr. Sunil Dohre testified that the weapon used for the U/V-shaped injuries could possibly be a golf club. The defence argued that the CBI officers had drawn the words "golf club" from Dohre's mouth. Talwars' lawyer stated that Aarushi had had a hairline fracture, and produced the forensic expert Dr. RK Sharma, who told the court that this fracture could not have been caused by a golf club.

Weapon used for slitting the throats

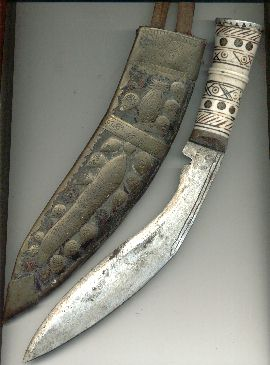
A typical kukri (Picture used for representational purpose only)

The weapon used for slitting the throats of the victims was never found. The identical measurements of the lacerated wounds suggested that the same weapon was used on both the victims. In May 2008, the forensic scientists remarked that the wounds displayed a "clinical precision and careful thought", as they were inflicted at the right spot to cut the windpipe and dissect the vital left common carotid artery which supplies oxygenated blood to the brain. Initially, when the Noida police first suspected the parents, they stated that the weapon used was a "surgical knife". By June 2008, the CBI's suspicion had shifted to the three Nepali men, and the weapon was believed to be a kukri, a type of Nepali knife.

The second CBI team returned to the "surgical instrument" theory. In 2013, CBI told the court that according to the faculty at the Talwars' alma mater Maulana Azad Medical College, their dental students were taught surgery. The defence argued that a dentist's scalpel has a cutting surface of about a centimeter: the instrument is too delicate to cut through the carotid artery. According to the defence witness Dr. RK Sharma, the wounds could have been caused by surgical scalpel No. 10 (not used by dentists) or a kukri.

=== Aarushi's room ===
Aarushi's body lay on her bed, covered with a white flannel blanket. Her face was covered with her schoolbag.

There was blood on the pillow, the bed, the walls, the floor and the front side of the bedroom door. However, there was no blood on the toys, the schoolbag and the pink pillow kept on the back of the bed. These items were within the range of the splashed blood area, which indicates that they were placed on the bed after the murder. Aarushi's body lay undisturbed on the bed, and the bed sheet was laid out smoothly. According to the CBI, no bloodstains were found on the book The 3 Mistakes of My Life, which Aarushi was supposedly reading before her murder.

=== Aarushi's body ===
The 2008 post-mortem report written by Dr. Sunil Dohre marked Aarushi's genital area as "nothing abnormal detected", thus ruling out a sexual assault, but also noted the presence of a "whitish discharge" at her vagina. The whitish discharge sample was sent for pathological examination at the local district hospital, which reported absence of semen. However, later, in 2009, when this vaginal swab sample was sent to CBI's forensic labs, it was suspected to have been tampered with (see below). Ultimately, the CBI concluded that the sample had got contaminated, but not deliberately tampered with. Later, gynaecologist Dr. Urmila Sharma testified that the whitish discharge is normal in 13- and 14-year-old girls after the beginning of a menstrual cycle.

The bed sheet had a wet circular mark below her pelvic area, which was not urine. There was no such wet patch on her Pajamas, which were untied; no urine or any other bodily fluid was found on her underwear either. The lower garments of Aarushi appeared to have been pulled up or pulled down, as her buttock cleavage was visible. CBI suspected that her pelvic area was swabbed clean, and the pyjamas were pulled up afterwards.

Later in 2012, Dr. Dohre stated that Aarushi's genitals were "extraordinarily dilated", although there were no signs of rape. He stated that her hymen was ruptured and that it had an old tear. He also stated that her vaginal orifice was "unduly large", the mouth of her cervix was visible and the whitish discharge was confined to the vagina, when it should have spread to the "entire area". Dr. Dohre stated that he had not mentioned these observations in his original report, because these were his "subjective findings", and because "the findings were non-specific and were very strange". He added the wide vaginal opening found on Aarushi's body could have resulted only when someone manipulated it while the rigor mortis was setting in. He thus concluded that Aarushi's genitals appeared to have been cleaned after she died.

=== Hemraj's body and the terrace ===
Hemraj's body had been dragged at least 20 feet on the terrace after his death, as evident by a blood trail and abrasion-contusion on his elbows.

The body was lying on the left of the roof entrance near the external unit of the air conditioner (AC), and was covered by a panel from the roof cooler. The body appeared to have been dragged towards the AC unit, as the quantity of blood was more near the AC unit. An expert from FSL Gandhinagar as well as a team of experts from CFSL concluded that the drag mark on the roof resulted from a blood-soaked body being dragged after being kept in a bed sheet. This raised suspicion that Hemraj might have been killed somewhere else, and his body dragged to the terrace in order to hide it. However, in June 2008, CBI's UV Light testing team reported that it didn't find Hemraj's bloodstains anywhere except the terrace. So, unless the killer cleaned up the original murder spot, Hemraj seems to have been killed on the terrace. The blood found on the staircase leading to the terrace on 17 May might have come from the mattress that the cleaners were trying to dump on the terrace.

A double-bed cover was draped upon the iron grill that separated the Talwars' terrace from the neighbouring terrace. The investigators found a smudged blood-stained palm print on the terrace wall. The blood was later identified as that of Hemraj, but the print could not be identified. The police also photographed a blood-stained shoe print on the terrace; the shoe size was 8 or 9.

According to the Talwars' lawyer Pinaki Mishra, those who had found Hemraj's body saw hair in his mouth, possibly that of his killer. However, the police did not check this.

Unlike Aarushi's body, which had undigested food in the stomach, Hemraj had just 25 ml of liquid in his stomach, indicating that he did not have dinner. This evidence was also supported by the fact that his dinner was found untouched in the kitchen on the morning of 16 May.

In 2012, during proceedings against Aarushi's parents as suspects, Dr. Naresh Raj told the court that Hemraj's penis was swollen when his body was brought for autopsy. According to him, this meant that he was either in middle of having sexual intercourse, or was about to engage in sexual intercourse. The defence lawyer cited a medical book which stated that this swelling of penis after death was normal. In response, the doctor stated that his conclusion was not based on any medical authority, but on experiences from his own married life.

=== Hemraj's room ===
On 1 July 2008, the first CBI team recorded a statement by K. K. Gautam, describing Hemraj's room as he found it on 17 May. According to this statement, Gautam saw three glasses, two of which had some quantity of liquor in them, while the third one was empty. He also found three bottles: Kingfisher (beer), a Sprite and Sula whisky. Later, DNA of Hemraj was found on the Kingfisher bottle, although according to CBI's investigators, he was a teetotaler.

Gautam also visited the servant's toilet where he "found urine of more than one person". According to the statement, he also saw a depression on Hemraj's mattress pointing to the presence of three people in his room. However, in 2012, Gautam told the court that there was no liquor in any of the glasses. He also stated that he had not suggested presence of three people in the room, based on the state of the mattress. When questioned about the discrepancies, he stated that the investigating officer should be asked why his statements were not recorded correctly. He stated that an officer from the first CBI team "distorted several things he said, added things he did not say, and produced a statement that suited the line of investigation at the time."

=== The doors and the keys ===
There were no signs of forced entry into the apartment, and the middle grill door had been found latched from the outside in the morning. There were two known sets of keys to the house entrance. One set was with the Talwars, and another with Hemraj. Nupur threw down one bunch of keys to the maid on the morning of 16 May. According to the CBI, Nupur had taken these keys from Hemraj's room. According to Nupur, Hemraj's keys would usually be kept on the sideboard, but she couldn't find them on that morning; so, she threw down her own keys to the maid. The question whether this key was that of Nupur or Hemraj was initially relevant to the investigation, as there were reports that the middle grill door had been locked from outside with a key (If both the keys were inside and CBI was right, it could mean that the parents locked the door, then went inside their apartment through Hemraj's door which they locked from inside, in order to mislead the investigators). However, later, the maid Bharati's testimony in the court established that the door was merely latched from outside. Thus, if the killers were not the parents, they could have shut the innermost wooden door (which automatically locked when shut), and then latched the middle grill door from outside.

When the maid, Bharati, visited the house on the morning of 16 May, she tried to push the outermost gate but could not open it. When she came back at the gate after collecting the bunch of keys (which Nupur had thrown down), she could open it by pushing it. The CBI theorized that the gate was originally latched from inside: when Bharati went down to fetch the keys, Nupur came to the passage via Hemraj's room, and unlatched it. In September 2012, the defence claimed that the maid Bharati Mandal was a tutored witness, as she told the court Jo samjhaya gaya wahi bayan de rahi hu ("I am saying whatever I was explained.") However, Bharati denied that she had given any incorrect statement under CBI's pressure. The defence stated that this door was simply not easy to open, and presented Rajesh's driver Umesh Sharma as a witness, who testified that this outermost door could be opened by pushing it hard.

The key to the terrace door was never found. According to the Talwars, this key was present in Hemraj's bunch of keys, which went missing after the murders.

The door to Aarushi's room (and the main door of the house) would lock automatically when shut. Aarushi's door could either be opened from inside, or from outside with a key. Usually, her room would be locked at the night, and its keys would be at Nupur's bedside. There was no sign of forced entry in Aarushi's room. On the morning of 16 May, the key was found in its shoe-shaped key ring, on top of a framed wall sculpture near the house entrance, in the living room. Nupur later told police that she was not sure whether she closed Aarushi's door the last time she entered the room at 11:00 pm, and if she did, she might have let the keys hanging in the key slot. She claims to have stated this in several lie detector, brain mapping and narco-analysis tests that she cleared. In 2013, the SP Mahesh Kumar Mishra told the court that, on 16 May 2008, Rajesh Talwar claimed that he had locked Aarushi's room from outside at 11:30 pm on the previous night. Rajesh also told him that he had forgotten to lock his own bedroom door from inside, and someone could have stolen the key to Aarushi's room from his room.

=== Phone records ===
Both Aarushi and Hemraj had mobile phones, but both the phones had disappeared after the murder.

Hemraj Banjade

Hemraj used a Tata Indicom mobile with the electronic serial number #20CFA3EC. The SIM card was registered in name of Rajesh. On 15 May, Hemraj had received two calls from the Talwars' clinic: the first call at 4:58 pm lasted for 10 minutes, and the second call at 5:37 pm lasted for 2 1/2 minutes. Rajesh was working in his Hauz Khas clinic at the time, while Nupur was in another area of Noida (Fortis Hospital), as indicated by her mobile phone records. The Talwars' defence lawyer later claimed that Krishna Thadarai was working in the Noida clinic at that time.

The last call made to Hemraj during his lifetime was at 8:27 pm, and it lasted for 6 minutes. The call had been made from a PCO in Sector 31; the PCO was located a kilometer away from the Talwars' apartment. The investigators were unable to determine who made this call.

The phone records confirmed that Nupur called Hemraj's phone from the Talwars' landline at 6.01 a.m. on 16 May. The call was picked up, but disconnected after two seconds. This call was the last received on the phone, which was somewhere in the coverage area of the Nithari village cell tower 1362/254. The cell tower had a radius of around 1 km, and covered the apartment complex in which the Talwars (and Thadarai) lived. The police therefore suspected that the killer was present inside the house or in its vicinity on the morning of 16 May.

Hemraj's phone was never found, but according to the CBI, the number was briefly active in Punjab.

Aarushi Talwar

Last transaction on Aarushi's phone during 15 days preceding her death
| Day | Time | Last activity |
|---|---|---|
| 1 May | 11:22 pm | SMS received |
| 2 May | 12:50 am | SMS received |
| 3 May | 12:58 am | SMS received |
| 4 May | 12:30 am | SMS sent |
| 5 May | 11:49 pm | SMS received |
| 6 May | 12:12 am | Call received |
| 7 May | 12:39 am | SMS received |
| 8 May | 12:19 am | SMS received |
| 9 May | 12:39 am | SMS received |
| 10 May | 12:39 am | SMS received |
| 11 May | 11:29 pm | Call received |
| 12 May | 11:20 pm | Call received |
| 13 May | 12:25 am | SMS received |
| 14 May | 01:08 am | SMS received |
| 15 May | 9:10 pm | SMS received |

Aarushi used a gloss black Nokia N72. She would usually chat with her friends on phone until past midnight. However, on the night of 15 May, her mobile phone was inactive after 9:10 pm. According to the investigators, some of her friends had tried to contact her, but found her mobile phone switched off. The police suspected that either the battery of Aarushi's mobile phone had died or it had been confiscated by this time.

Around midnight, Aarushi's friend Anmol tried calling Aarushi on her mobile and then on the family's landline, but there was no response. Anmol sent an SMS message to her mobile phone at around half-past-midnight. According to the phone records, this SMS was not received by Aarushi's phone.

A few days after her death, Aarushi's phone was found on a dirt track by a housemaid named Kusum, near Noida's Sadarpur area. The phone was possessed by her brother Ram Bhool since May 2008, but he started using it only in February 2009, when he bought a new SIM card. He used it intermittently; on 12 September 2009, the police traced the phone to his residence in Bulandshahar, and recovered the phone from one Jitender whom he had just sold the phone to. Kusum and Ram Bhool were taken into custody for questioning, but the CBI determined that they had no role in the murders: they were not aware that the phone belonged to Aarushi, and had no mala fide intention in keeping it. The police did not find a data card, pictures or text messages on the recovered phone.

Family's landline

The family's landline phone was kept in the bedroom of Rajesh and Nupur Talwar. According to the investigators, Anmol called the landline phone around 11:30 pm, and the call lasted 34 seconds. However, Rajesh denied any knowledge about such a call. Anmol also dialed the family's landline number around midnight, after having failed to reach Aarushi on her mobile: there was no response. The Talwars say that Aarushi would sometimes turn off the ringer on the landline at night, and she might have done it on that night too.

The neighbor Puneesh Tandon later told the court that when he visited the Talwar residence on the morning of 16 May, he asked Nupur's father if he had called the police. Nupur's father told him that the landline was out-of-order.

Rajesh Talwar

Rajesh's mobile phone records do not indicate anything out of the ordinary. The tower location indicates that he was at his residence. He had exchanged 16 calls with his fellow practitioner Anita Durrani until 8 pm. At 9:50 pm, he called the Impressionzz traders in Mumbai, from whom he had ordered Aarushi's camera through Indiatimes shopping, probably to ask about a camera feature. At 10.04 pm, he received a call from the father of a patient, who had an appointment on the next day. At 10:06, he called Dr. Mridul Seth to consult on a surgery scheduled on the next day. At 10:15, he received a call from Vikas Sethi, an employee at his Hauz Khas clinic. At 10:38, he received a call from a UAE number. At 10:54 pm and 11:01 pm, he made calls to the American Academy of Implant Dentistry, Chicago. The next call from his mobile was at 6:19 am on the next day, after the discovery of Aarushi's body.

Nupur Talwar

Nupur's mobile phone was switched off from 7:40 pm on 15 May to 1 pm on 18 May. The call records showed that it had not been switched off even once during 60 days preceding the murder.

=== Claims of threat to Hemraj Banjade's life ===
According to the police, Hemraj had told some of his friends about a threat to his life. Although Hemraj's son-in-law Jeevan denied any knowledge of such a threat, a social worker Usha Thakur confirmed that five days before his murder, Hemraj had told her that he feared for "his life and that of some of his near and dear ones". Later, she told the investigators that she could not do anything for him that day, since she had rush to Bangalore due to a family emergency.

Nearly three years after the murder, in March 2011, Hemraj's wife Khumkala, a resident of Nepal, came to India. She moved a plea at the CBI court in Ghaziabad, alleging that she suspected the Talwars to be the murderers. She stated that Hemraj treated Aarushi like his own daughter, but had strained relations with Rajesh. She claimed when Hemraj visited Nepal in December 2007, he had described Rajesh as a short-tempered person who rebuked him for trivial things and even chased him to beat him up. She also claimed that Hemraj had called her from a PCO 15 days before his murder: He told her that Rajesh and Nupur suspected him of leaking their family secrets. When Rajesh's brother Dinesh visited their house, he also looked upon Hemraj with suspicion. The three threatened to kill him, if he dared leak the family's private information to the outsiders. According to her, Hemraj was frustrated with the Talwars' behaviour and was searching for a new job. Hemraj's wife also claimed that Hemraj had not sent any money back home since December 2007, and had told her that he had kept the money with the Talwars. But the Talwars did not send her Hemraj's dues after his murder. When asked why she had not made these revelations earlier, she stated that she had faith in India's judiciary until that point; her lawyer stated that she came from a poor family and had little awareness.

=== Other evidence ===
- Hemraj Banjade had apparently served himself dinner in a plate around 10:30 pm, but never ate it. His bed was still tidy in the morning, indicating that he didn't go to sleep on that night.
- A Ballantine's Scotch whisky bottle with bloodstains was found on the dining table. The bloodstains were confirmed as that of Aarushi and Hemraj by a DNA expert. The Scotch whisky bottle came from a mini-bar concealed behind a wooden panel, so it appears that the person who took it out knew the house well. The bottle was seized on the morning of 16 May, but no clear fingerprints could be recovered from it.
- Constable Chunnilal Gautam took the first photographs of the crime scene and collected fingerprints on 16 May. The police had gathered 26 fingerprints from the crime scene. According to a CBI official, 24 of these were gathered through wrong methods and could not be preserved. Only 2 fingerprints were suitable for evidential purposes, but these did not match with any of the suspects. Chunnilal did not take fingerprints of Aarushi.
- Aarushi's camera had photographs numbered 13, 15, 20, 22 and 23: this indicates that at least 23 photographs had been taken using the camera, out of which 18 had been deleted. The CBI considered the possibility of the photographs having been deleted by someone other than Aarushi. Nupur suggested a simpler explanation: Aarushi took several pictures, and deleted the ones she didn't like.
- At around 3:43 am, nearly 3 hours after Aarushi's murder, the Internet router in Aarushi's room switched off. The CBI produced a technical expert from CERT-In who stated that the switching on/off of the router after a long gap can only happen due to either a power cut or manual intervention. There was no power cut on the night of the murders, a fact attested to by the electricity department. The router was next switched on at 6.01 am. However, the router switched on and off a number of times with long gaps throughout 16 May, even when the police and the visitors were present in the apartment. The CBI concluded that such unexplained router activity made this piece of evidence unreliable.

== Previous servants as suspects ==
The discovery of Hemraj's body had greatly embarrassed the police, as their initial investigation focused on him as the murderer. The police were also criticized for other investigation lapses, such as not cordoning off the crime scene. The investigating officer Inspector Dataram Nauneria (SHO of Noida Sector-20 police station) was shifted on 17 May. The next day, Superintendent of Police (City) Mahesh Mishra was also transferred.

On 19 May the police named the Talwars' former Nepali domestic help Vishnu Sharma (alias Vishnu Thapa) as the suspect. Vishnu had worked as a servant and a clinic helper for the Talwars for 10 years. He would go on long vacations; each time, he would replace himself with a distant relative. When he left for a vacation 8 months before the murder, he introduced Hemraj to the Talwars as his replacement. However, when he returned, he found himself out of job: the Talwars preferred to retain Hemraj as a permanent employee. The police suspected that an angry Vishnu might have killed Hemraj for usurping his job; Aarushi might have been killed for being a witness. Vishnu was taken into custody, along with former servants of the Talwars. However, the police were unable to find any evidence that connected him to the murders. It was confirmed that he was in Nepal on the day of the murders.

== Parents as the suspects ==
On 21 May, Delhi Police joined the UP police in the investigation. By this time, the police as well as the media had started suspecting the parents for multiple reasons:

- The distance between the beds of Aarushi and her parents (in different bedrooms) was around 7–8 feet. Yet, the parents claimed that they didn't hear any noise and slept through the murders.
- There was no sign of forced entry into Aarushi's room, which would usually be locked at night. Someone outside the room could open it only with a key usually kept beside Nupur's bedside. The parents could not explain how the murderers gained access to this key, which was found in the living room after the murder.
- On the morning of 16 May, Rajesh asked the police to stop wasting time in his house and pursue Hemraj instead. He even offered to cover the cost of police's visit to Hemraj's native village in Nepal. This offer was seen as a diversionary tactic.
- Rajesh ignored the police's request for the key to the terrace door. An attempt had been made to hide Hemraj's body, as evident by the fact that it had been covered with a cooler panel and that the iron grill separating the adjacent terrace had been covered with a bed sheet. The police suspected that the Talwars planned to blame Aarushi's murder on Hemraj, and hid his body on the terrace for disposing of it later. However, the media glare and a constant stream of visitors made it impossible for them to get rid of the body.
- When Hemraj's body was discovered, Rajesh told the police that he could not identify it.
- The crime scene had been dressed-up. Aarushi's bed sheet remained undisturbed, and her body had been covered with a white flannel blanket. There was no blood on the toys, the schoolbag and a pink pillow, indicating that these items had been kept at the crime scene after the murder.
- The family allegedly showed "undue" haste in cremating Aarushi's body and cleaning the crime scene on 16 May.
- According to some of the visitors, the parents did not display shock or grief. SP Mahesh Kumar Mishra claimed that the Talwars looked "very nervous" when he questioned them on 16 May.
- During 16–17 May, a series of telephonic conversations happened between K. K. Gautam, Dr. Sushil Chaudhury and Rajesh's brother Dinesh Talwar. Gautam later alleged that Chaudhury, a friend of Dinesh, had asked him to get any reference to a sexual assault removed from the post-mortem-report.
- Hemraj had spoken of a threat to his life before his death. The police suspected that he knew about Rajesh's alleged extra-marital affair, and Rajesh had threatened him not to talk about it.

Accordingly, the police started investigating the parents as the suspects. On 22 May, Meerut inspector-general Gurdarshan Singh speculated about a scenario where Hemraj was the main target of the killing, but stated that no arrests will be made without evidence:

Possible sequence of events according to Inspector-General Gurdarshan Singh (22 May)
- Hemraj knew about Rajesh's alleged extra-marital affair, and was blackmailing him
- Rajesh took Hemraj to the terrace on the pretext of discussing the issue
- Rajesh killed Hemraj on the terrace
- Aarushi was killed for being a witness and for objecting to her father's affair

On 23 May, Rajesh and Nupur were taken to the Police Lines area, where they were split up. Nupur was put in a room with her cousin and a woman constable, while Rajesh was arrested and taken to a local magistrate. Subsequently, Rajesh was taken to the Dasna jail. Rajesh later claimed that the magistrate did not allow him to make any phone calls, and police threatened him into signing a confession on the way to the jail. He claimed that the police were talking whether they should kill him; when he refused to sign the confession, they abused and threatened him throughout the day. Since it was Friday, Rajesh could not apply for a bail until Monday. He spent the weekend in the jail. He later stated that the police threatened him to sign the confession again while he was in their custody.

On the same day, Gurdarshan Singh organized a press conference. He announced that Rajesh killed Aarushi and Hemraj to hide his extramarital affair with Anita Durrani. He claimed that Aarushi's friend Anmol stated that she had told him about her father's affair. (On 22 May, the police had questioned Anmol, who had 688 phone interactions with her in the 45 days preceding her murder.) Singh presented the following possible sequence of events, but did not mention any specific evidence:

Possible sequence of events according to Inspector-General Gurdarshan Singh (23 May)
- Rajesh was having an extra-marital affair with Anita Durrani. Aarushi objected to this relationship. Disturbed by her father's adultery, Aarushi had confided in (or even started a sexual relationship with) Hemraj.
- On 15 May, Rajesh left the home at 9:30 pm, and came back at around 11:30 pm
- When he arrived, he found Aarushi and Hemraj in an "objectionable, though not compromising, position"
- Rajesh took Hemraj to the terrace, hit him with a heavy weapon, and then slit his throat.
- He then locked the terrace door, and had Scotch whisky.
- Then he killed his daughter.

After coming under criticism for maligning Aarushi's character, Singh modified his theory to state Rajesh hit Aarushi when she confronted him on his extramarital affair, while Hemraj was killed for being a witness to Aarushi's death.

The police accused Nupur Talwar of helping cover up the crime. The prosecution later alleged that she deliberately called Hemraj's phone to make the investigators believe that the killer was elsewhere. In the last week of May 2008, the police claimed that they had a confession from Rajesh Talwar, but the Talwars denied this. Rajesh stated that one Dinesh Verma was framing him, but the investigators later stated that there was no person with this name working on the case.

The public opinion turned against the Talwars, and many of their friends started avoiding them. The Fortis Hospital fired Rajesh on the same day. However, the members of the Indian Dental Association and former patients professed their belief in Rajesh's innocence.

The police seized Rajesh Talwar's laptop, and the hard disk of Aarushi's computer on 25 May. A few days later, they claimed that Aarushi's e-mails to her father "justify her relations with three other boys", and that "objectionable" words were used in her interactions with her friends. The police released selective e-mails to indicate that Aarushi was not on good terms with her father. For example, one of the e-mails to her father read "I just wanted to try it out coz I heard from mah frndz ... so wotz da harm ... I wnt do it again n I kinda noe hw u r feelin." (This particular e-mail was actually a year old, and was Aarushi's apology for her insistence to go out for watching the movie Namaste London with her friends without an adult). In June, a report in the Mid-Day newspaper quoted an unnamed Delhi police official as saying that the Talwars were part of a wife swapping club, and they would lock Aarushi in her room whenever the club members met at the Talwar residence. It further claimed that Hemraj told Aarushi about this club, and called a number in Dubai, where the kingpin of this club was residing a night before the murder. On 6 July, an English daily Mail Today reported that the Talwars spent the night of the murders at a high-society party in a posh South Delhi hotel, quoting CBI sources. Both Nupur Talwar and CBI refuted the allegations.

Aarushi's friends and relatives were outraged at the character assassination of the family, especially at the suggestion that she was in a sexual relationship with Hemraj. The supporters of the Talwars say that the police and the media tried to malign Aarushi as a disturbed, promiscuous teenager. Aarushi had received a bouquet of flowers from an admirer, had done a school project on drug addiction, and had 688 interactions with her schoolmate Anmol in 45 days. All these were used to build a "portrait of promiscuity" according to the Talwars' supporters. Her schoolmates at the Delhi Public School organized a candlelight vigil condemning the police for maligning her name. Renuka Chowdhury, the Minister for Women and Child Development, demanded the suspension of Inspector-General Singh. Singh was transferred a month later, only to be transferred back two months later.

=== Parents' defense ===
Rajesh claimed that he was being framed by the police to cover up their own botched-up investigation. The case was transferred to the Central Bureau of Investigation (CBI) on 31 May at the request of Aarushi's parents. In June, CBI started investigating the case under the Joint-Director Arun Kumar IPS.

The Talwars provided counter-arguments for the points that had made them the prime suspects:

Sleeping through the murders
The Talwars stated that they slept through the murders because of the noise produced by two air conditioners on the hot night. The couple's room had a window AC, and Aarushi's room had a split AC; both were switched on the night of 15 May. In addition, their bedroom was shut. Aarushi is also believed to have had a throat infection, due to which she could not have screamed aloud. In 2013, the defence witness and forensic expert Dr. RK Sharma stated that a 14-year-old child would have fallen unconscious immediately due to the first blow from the blunt weapon, and would not have been able to scream for help. He based this statement on an analysis of the injuries on Aarushi's body. A sound expert team later recreated the air conditioners' noise in the house on CBI's invitation. The team concluded that it was possible that the Talwars' could not hear the sounds outside their room, and thus, could have slept through the activities in their house on that night.

Murder of Aarushi and Hemraj in a fit of anger on finding them together
The later evidence suggested that the killers did not drag Hemraj's body to the terrace to hide it: he was killed on the terrace, which nullifies the theory that Rajesh killed him when he saw him in Aarushi's room.
Rajesh's driver Sharma testified that the clothes worn by Rajesh on the morning of 16 May were the same as the ones he saw him wearing the previous night when he came to return the keys. His description of Rajesh's clothes matched that of the maid Bharati, who told the court that Rajesh was wearing a red T-shirt and a half trouser, while Nupur was wearing a blue maxi gown. There was only Aarushi's blood on Rajesh's clothes, but no blood of Hemraj could be traced on these clothes. There was no blood on the clothes that Nupur was seen wearing in the photographs taken by Aarushi on the night before. This implied that the parents could not have committed the murders under sudden provocation, as speculated by the police.
The parents also pointed out that they would not partake in something like honor killing, as they came from liberal educated families and had an inter-caste marriage.

Undue haste in cremation and cleaning
The parents denied that they had dressed up the crime scene, pointing out that if they wanted to do so, they would have not left the Scotch whisky bottle with bloodstains in the living room for everyone to see. The family denied that they had shown any haste in cleaning the crime scene or cremating Aarushi's body. Nupur's mother Lata Chitnis and their clinic manager Vikas Sethi stated they received permission from the police to clean the house. The police had told them that they had already collected all the necessary evidence, including a part of Aarushi's mattress. It was the police who suggested that Aarushi's mattress be taken to the terrace for now, given the media clamor downstairs. Vikas found the terrace locked, and when he could not find the key, he placed the mattress on the neighbouring terrace. The family also claimed that the police confirmed that they wouldn't need the body for any further analysis, since the post-mortem had already been done. Since it was decomposing fast, they cremated it.

Access to Aarushi's room
Nupur explained the killer's force-free entry into Aarushi's room by stating that she might have left the key hanging at the door lock, when she arrived to switch on the Internet router.

Extra-marital affair
The Talwars and the Durranis denied that Rajesh and Anita were engaged in an extramarital affair. According to them, the two couples had close ties, because they shared dental clinics and both were nuclear families with teenage daughters.

Other
- The fingerprints of the parents were not found on the Scotch whisky bottle or the blood-stained clothes of the victims.
- Rajesh stated that he urged the police to pursue Hemraj, because being missing, he was the obvious suspect.
- Rajesh also claimed that he had no recollection of the police asking him for the keys to the terrace door.
- He could not recognize Hemraj's body as it was highly decomposed. He also claimed that he noticed that the T-shirt on the body read "New York"; the police had told him that the person was wearing a kada (a bracelet). He went down to ask Nupur (who was sitting in the car) whether Hemraj had worn these two items. When Nupur confirmed that he did, Rajesh called Dinesh to say that the body was most likely that of Hemraj.
- Dinesh denied asking K. K. Gautam to use his influence to change the post-mortem report. He claimed that CBI could not find any records of him making calls at the post-mortem house.
- The crime scene had been compromised, so CBI turned to polygraph test (lie-detector), brain-mapping tests and narco-analysis. Rajesh and Nupur cleared two lie-detector tests and a brain-mapping test, which did not find any evidence of lying on their part.
- The Talwars' relatives and friends state that the parents displayed adequate signs of grief. Nupur's father BG Chitnis reported that "Rajesh had become hysterical and was banging his head against the wall." Radhika Chada, a family friend, stated that Nupur was in "complete shock". Masooma Ranalvi, mother of Aarushi's friend Fiza, said that Rajesh and Nupur were "numb with grief".
- The size of the shoeprint found on the terrace was 8 or 9, while Rajesh's shoe size is 6.

== Thadarai, Rajkumar and Mandal as the suspects ==
According to the Talwars, the idea of Aarushi and Hemraj having a relationship and that of Rajesh's extra-marital affair was planted by Krishna Thadarai, an assistant at the Talwars' dental clinic. Rajesh stated that two days before the murders, he had reprimanded Thadarai for making an incorrect dental cast. This claim was supported by Anita Durrani. Rajesh's driver Umesh Sharma stated that he had heard Thadarai and Hemraj talking loudly in Nepali in the car. When he inquired, Thadarai told him that he would "deal with Rajesh". Hemraj's phone was present in the Jalvayu Vihar apartment complex on the morning of 16 May, and Thadarai (along with the Talwars) lived in the same area.

On 7 June, Thadarai was detained on suspicion. The CBI team searched his house and found a pillow cover, along with a blood-stained kukri and trousers. He was subjected to polygraph test twice at Central Forensic Science Laboratory (CFSL), Delhi. On 9 June, he appeared for a psychological assessment test at AIIMS, New Delhi. On 12 June, he was administered a polygraph test and Narco Analysis test at the Bowring Hospital, Bangalore under the supervision of an expert team from the Forensic Science Laboratory (FSL), led by assistant director Dr. S Malini and anaesthetist Dr. Srikanta Murthy. He was arrested on 13 June. Meanwhile, lie detection tests conducted on Rajesh and Nupur Talwar both turned out to be inconclusive. A second set of tests did not find any evidence of deception on their part.

In his Narco test, Thadarai talked of a second murderer. Accordingly, the CBI also started investigating his friend Rajkumar, who was a domestic servant with the Durranis. During 23–26 June, Rajkumar was subjected to polygraph test, psychological assessment, brain mapping and narco analysis at FSL, Gandhinagar. The CBI seized washed T-shirts with faint human blood stains from his residence, and sent them for DNA matching. The Durranis, who were close friends of the Talwars, stated that the stains could be from the boils that Rajkumar had on his body. On 27 June, Rajkumar was arrested on suspicion.

On 30 June 2008, Vijay Mandal (aka Shambhu), another friend of Thadarai, was reported as a suspect in the media. Mandal was a driver and domestic help for Talwars' neighbour Puneesh Tandon. Hemraj, Thadarai and Rajkumar were all of Nepali origin, and had been recruited through Vishnu, the ex-servant of the Talwars. On 9 July, Rajkumar was subjected to a second narco-analysis test at FSL Bangalore, and the next day, the media reported that he had confessed to the murders. Vijay Mandal, already being investigated, was also arrested on 11 July.

According to a later petition by the Talwars, the Narco tests had revealed that the three suspects had watched a Nepali song on the TV in Hemraj's room on the night of the murders. This had been told to the journalist Nalini Singh by the CBI official Anuj Arya. Nalini Singh, the owner of the Nepalese channel on which the song was telecast, had been asked for the details of the songs telecast on her channel on the night of the murders. Anuj Arya told her that the information provided by her matched with the suspects' revelations.

During a press-conference on 11 July 2008, Arun Kumar stated that the case was still unsolved. He stated that no evidence had been found against Rajesh Talwar, but also added that the CBI had not given him a "clean chit". He stated that Thadarai, Rajkumar and Mandal seemed to be the prime suspects, based on the narco tests, but the CBI had not found any corroborative evidence against them.

The three men had described different sequences of events during their narco tests. There were different versions even among the same person's test. For example, Thadarai provided three different versions regarding the murder weapon. CBI did not make the transcripts of narco tests available to the public, and there were conflicting media reports about the exact sequence of events, which was somewhat like this:

Possible sequence of events according to CBI Joint Director Arun Kumar, based on the suspects' narco tests
- Hemraj invited Thadarai, Rajkumar and Mandal (Shambhu) to his servant quarters at the Talwars' apartment. The three men reached the Talwars residence around midnight.
  - According to Rajkumar's narco test, Mandal was a domestic help working for Talwars' neighbours, but he had no role to play in the murders.
- The four men started drinking beer. Thadarai spoke of his humiliation by Rajesh Talwar, and expressed his desire to take revenge.
- Aarushi's room was surprisingly unlocked that day. What happened exactly after that differs according to different narco tests and media reports:
  - Rajkumar's version:
    - Aarushi threatened to expose what the suspects said about her father, so Thadarai took out his Kukri and killed her.
    - The suspects planned to flee, but Hemraj developed cold feet and threatened to expose them.
    - Thadarai and Rajkumar dragged Hemraj to the terrace and killed him.
    - The mobile phones of Aarushi and Hemraj were destroyed.
  - Thadarai's version 1:
    - Rajkumar and Thadarai entered Aarushi's room, and Rajkumar tried to sexually assault her.
    - When Aarushi resisted, Thadarai drew out a kukri and killed her.
    - Then the two men dragged Hemraj to the terrace and killed him for being a witness.
  - Thadarai's version 2:
    - Rajkumar and Mandal (Shambhu) entered Aarushi's room and tried to rape her.
    - When Aarushi resisted, Mandal hit her on the head and Rajkumar then killed her with a kukri
    - The murder weapon was cleaned with a tissue paper and flushed down in Aarushi's washroom.
    - Thadarai, Rajkumar and Mandal then took Hemraj to the terrace and killed him.
    - The three men "escaped from the roof of the building after locking the terrace door".
  - Thadarai's version 3:
    - Rajkumar walked towards Aarushi's room. Thadarai and Mandal followed him.
    - Rajkumar tried to sexually assault Aarushi.
    - When she resisted, Thadarai took out his kukri and slit her throat: the blow was so hard that her neck ripped open and she fell dead.
    - Hemraj got scared and threatened to tell Aarushi's parents about the incident. So, the other men took him to the terrace and killed him.
    - Thadarai, Mandal and Rajkumar tried entering the Talwars' room but found it locked.

Rajesh Talwar was released later in the day, for lack of evidence, after having spent 50 days in prison. Rajesh and Nupur relocated to their parents' home after his release. The three other suspects were arrested, but the drug-induced confession was not enough to charge them.

=== Defence of Thadarai, Rajkumar and Mandal ===
Alibis

- Thadarai's family members and his landlord KN Johri stated that he was at his house (L-14, Sector 25) on the night of 15 May.
- Vijay Mandal's employer and Talwars' neighbour Puneesh Tandon told investigators that his servant was in his garage (L-28, Sector 25).
- Rajkumar's employer Anita Durrani stated that he was present in her house (35-A, Kanchanjanga Apartment, Sector 35) at least until 12.30 am. Rajkumar stated that he had gone to the New Delhi Railway station with his employer Praful Durrani to receive Anita Durrani: they had returned home at 11:30 pm, had dinner and everybody slept around 12:30 am (the Durranis say that Rajkumar's bathroom was outside the house's main back door, and he had the key, so he could go outside anytime he wished). The time needed to reach the Talwars' apartment from the Durranis' house by bicycle is about 20 minutes. The watchman at the gate of the society where Rajkumar lived did not see him leaving the place on that night.
- Jalvayu Vihar's six security guards - Virender Singh, Sanjay Singh, Ram Kumar, Chandra Bhushan, Devender Singh and Ram Vishal - stated that they had not seen anyone visiting or leaving the Talwars' house (L-32, Sector 25) that night. However, CBI also noted that the guards were mobile during the night, and their statements cannot be considered foolproof. The complex has 1886 apartments and houses nearly 10,000 people. Virender Singh, who was at the main gate, stated that there were several ways of getting in and out of the complex without encountering him.

Confessions in the Narco tests

- Narco tests are not reliable, and are considered inadmissible as evidence. The Narco report of Thadarai and Rajkumar stated that Aarushi's mobile phone was sent to Nepal. However, it was recovered from India in September 2009 (having been discovered by a maid in 2008). This further highlighted the unreliability of the narco tests.
- Rajkumar's lawyer Naresh Yadav approached the National Human Rights Commission (NHRC), stating that the three men had been tortured by the CBI officers during the investigation. As evidence, he submitted video recordings of tests that allegedly showed the CBI officers "putting words in their mouth and torturing them to confess to the murders." Nepali organizations such as Mool Pravah Akhil Bharat Nepali Ekta Samaj and Rastriya Janamorcha also alleged that CBI was pressurizing the poor men to make confessional statements, in order to protect the Talwars.
- In 2015, a 58.55-minute-long video of Thadarai's Narco test was leaked on YouTube; CBI had only a 45-minute video in its records. The leaked video shows Thadarai saying that he had not committed any crime, and that the IG (Inspector General Arun Kumar) had asked him to confess to the murders. Kumar claimed that the "original" footage did not have this portion.
- According to the CBI officials, Thadarai had confessed to the crime, but changed his statements several times.
- Vijay Mandal had not been mentioned in the test, and "Shambhu" being his alias was CBI's conjecture. On 31 July, the TV channel Aaj Tak alleged that Vijay Mandal had been drilled with leading information, prior to his narco-analysis tests. It also alleged that his apparent confessions during the tests had many gaps.

Other

- No DNA or fingerprints belonging to the three men could be identified from the items seized in the Talwars' house. On 17 June 2008, SK Singla, a serologist at the Central Forensic Science Laboratory (CFSL) Delhi, said he could not identify any human blood on the kukri recovered from Thadarai's room. The kukri was then sent to the CFSL DNA expert BK Mahapatra, who said he could not extract any DNA from the weapon.
- CBI could not find any hard evidence of any physical or phone-based interaction between Thadarai, Rajkumar, Mandal and Hemraj on that day. Besides, Rajkumar and Mandal did not try to abscond even after Thadarai was arrested.
- On 6 November 2008, a report from CDFD Hyderabad stated that the blood marks on the pillow recovered from Thadarai's residence matched Hemraj's blood. Nobody in the CBI team, including Arun Kumar or the investigating officer MS Phartiyal noticed this. When the Talwars' defence lawyers noticed this in 2011, the CBI stated that there was an error in the report: the pillow in the question was the one recovered from Hemraj's room, not from Thadarai's residence. The lab acknowledged CBI's claim.

On 9 August 2008, the CBI director Ashwani Kumar stated that the case remained unsolved, but also added that Rajesh Talwar should be exonerated. The three men were released in September, after the police could not find any hard evidence against them. Immediately after his release, Vijay Mandal alleged that the CBI had used physical force and threats against him, and at times, praised him to coax him into turning an approver against Thadarai and Rajkumar. He insisted that the charges against all three of them were false and an attempt to frame them. He also stated that he did not know Rajkumar at all, and that the CBI "trapped" him into saying something wrong when he was semi-conscious.

== 2009-10 investigation ==
In January 2009, CBI announced that the agency was ready to file a chargesheet against Thadarai, Rajkumar and Mandal. However, in the absence of any hard evidence, this could not be done.

=== Alleged tampering of Aarushi's sample ===
In September 2009, it was reported that Aarushi Talwar's vaginal swab sample had been tampered with. The sample had been collected by Dr. Sunil Dohre during her post-mortem, and sent to the Gautam Budh Nagar district hospital. The hospital's medico-legal register, which contained the information about Aarushi's sample, went missing in 2008. Pathologist Dr. Ritcha Saxena (the wife of Dr. Naresh Raj, who conducted Hemraj's post-mortem) performed the procedure of converting the swabs into slides and conducted the vaginal swab test. According to her, when the sample arrived at the hospital, it was collected by her lab technicians Vikas and Navneet.

Ritcha Saxena's tests established no semen was present in the sample. The slides were then kept into a steel almirah in the hospital's laboratory. On 1 June 2008, CBI contacted Ritcha over phone requesting access to the sample. Ritcha, who was in Patna at the time, guided the CBI team to her lab over the phone. According to her, the slide was handed over to the CBI by the Chief Medical Superintendent S C Singhal in her absence. Singhal and Ritcha had been involved in a dispute over her transfer: Ritcha had been transferred in 2008, but she neither took up her new post nor resigned. Singhal thus considered her as officially on leave at the time she prepared Aarushi's slides. Ritcha alleged that Singhal had deliberately taken all her registers away to mark her absent, although she regularly came to the hospital every day.

The CBI later sent the sample to their own CFSL lab in Delhi, where Dr. BK Mohapatra found it to be a mix of two vaginal samples, one of which was Aarushi's. The CBI then sent the sample for further testing to the Centre for DNA Fingerprinting and Diagnostics (CDFD) in Hyderabad. The CDFD stated that the sample largely contained DNA of a person other than Aarushi. Initially, the CBI considered the possibility of a conspiracy to destroy the evidence that Aarushi might have been sexually assaulted or had consensual intercourse prior to her death.

Dr. Ritcha Saxena was suspected of tampering with the samples. Her involvement came under scrutiny, because she personally knew Aarushi's mother Nupur Talwar. Ritcha denied that Nupur Talwar tried to influence the results of her tests in any way. She also stated that she knew Nupur only to some extent: her son had been treated by Nupur at the Fortis hospital several years before, and her daughter was Aarushi's junior at the Delhi Public School. She claimed that when she tested Aarushi's swab, she did not know that the subject was Nupur's daughter.

The Talwars were questioned about the tampering allegations during their lie-detector and brain-mapping tests, but were cleared. The CBI also questioned Ritcha, searched her labs and retrieved over a dozen vaginal swab slides. These slides were sent to Hyderabad for testing, but none matched the unidentified DNA traced in Aarushi's slide. The CBI ultimately concluded that the original sample was that of Aarushi, but it had become contaminated. It dismissed the entire episode as a genuine mistake and not a cover-up. In an unrelated development, Ritcha was later fired for absenteeism as she had not reported to her new post.

=== New CBI team ===
In July 2008, the Uttar Pradesh government had announced Arun Kumar's (1985 batch IPS officer) recall to the UP cadre. At that time, the UP government had clarified that the recall had no connection with the Aarushi case. Arun Kumar's tenure at CBI ended in September 2009. The media had accused him of not investigating the alleged tampering scandal, and speculated that this scandal had resulted in him being taken off the case.

In September 2009, the case was transferred to a new CBI team headed by SP Neelabh Kishore. Additional SP AGL Kaul served as the investigating officer.

=== Parents suspected again ===
Apart from the reasons that had made the parents the prime suspects earlier, the new CBI team came up with some additional points. The CBI questioned the doctors who had conducted the postmortem on Aarushi's body. Both Dr. Sunil Dohre and Dr. Naresh Raj made new statements (see the Evidence section above). Dr. Dohre stated that Aarushi's hymen was ruptured, and her genitals appeared to have been cleaned. Dr. Naresh Raj stated that Hemraj's swollen genitals indicated the possibility of sexual intercourse. In October 2009, a crime-scene analysis was done for CBI based on the photographs of the scene. This analysis supported the conjecture that the crime scene had been dressed-up after the murders.

Dr. Sunil Dohre later told the court that before the autopsy began, Dinesh Talwar gave him a phone and asked him to talk to "Dr. Dogra". Dohre was under the impression that the person on the line was AIIMS Forensics head Dr. TD Dogra. The person asked him to take blood samples among other samples, and Dohre replied that he would do whatever he felt was required. Later, it was found out that the Dr. Dogra of AIIMS did not talk to Dohre. The CBI inferred that Dinesh was trying to influence the report, but the defence argued that asking someone to take blood samples cannot be considered as such an attempt.

The new CBI team identified the weapon used for the initial blow as a golf club because of the "triangular-shaped head injury". The CBI suspected that the weapon used to deliver the blow was one of Rajesh's golf clubs. Rajesh was an amateur and infrequent golf player. His neighbour Puneesh Tandon had given him a golf bag 8–9 years back. On 29 October 2009, after the Talwars had moved away from their Noida house, the CBI asked them to send Rajesh's golf set to them. Rajesh complied the next day, handing over the golf set consisting of 3 woods (No. 1, 3 and 5), 7 irons (No. 3-9) and a putter. The CBI later stated that the dimensions of the striking surface of the golf club bearing No. 5 were identical to the dimensions of the injuries on the heads of the victims. No blood, DNA or any other biological fluid could be recovered from the golf clubs. A CFSL expert stated that two particular golf clubs marked as Exhibit 3 (the 5-wood) and Exhibit 5 (the 4-iron) "appeared to have been thoroughly cleaned so much so that they were visibly distinct" from the other golf clubs. The CBI suggested that these clubs might have been cleaned to hide their use in the murders. According to Rajesh, the golf clubs bearing No. 4 and No. 5 were originally placed in his car. When the car was sent for servicing (before the murders), the driver Umesh Sharma placed them in Hemraj's room. This event was confirmed by Sharma. Rajesh also says that he never tried to hide these clubs: they were always in plain sight of the investigators, and when he had moved to Delhi, all his belongings, including the golf clubs, were packed under the supervision of a CBI inspector. However, the CBI stated that in the photographs of Hemraj's room, taken by CFSL on 1 June 2008, only one golf club is visible and the other is missing. Rajesh also stated that his friend Ajay Chadda and his wife Nupur had found a golf club in the loft of their residence, when the loft was being cleaned a year after the murders. However, they did not inform CBI for over a year. This information was confirmed by Chadda. The defence pointed out that this is irrelevant to the case: the golf set had two clubs numbered 5 - the iron found in the loft, and the one that the CBI suspected to be the murder weapon, which was a wood.

Nilabh Kishore questioned the Talwars at his Dehradun office on 18–19 May 2010. A few days later, on 24 May (Aarushi's birthday), a story in The Pioneer implied that Aarushi had been murdered by Rajesh in an honor killing, quoting unnamed sources in the CBI. On 21 July, Rajesh Talwar asked the court to pass a restraint order against the "unethical and misleading information" being published by the print media outlets. When the Court issued a show cause notice to The Pioneer, Nilabh Kishore issued an affidavit on 4 October 2010 stating that "no authorised person in the CBI" had spoken to The Pioneer's correspondent, and that the article was full of "factual infirmities and conjectures".

=== CBI's closure report ===
On 29 December 2010, CBI filed a closure report, naming Rajesh Talwar as the sole suspect. The report is summarized below:

Parents

According to the CBI, the circumstantial evidence pointed towards the involvement of the parents in the crime. Only they had a reason and the ability to dress up the crime scene (e.g. covering Aarushi's body, streamlining her bed linen, cleaning up her genitals, attempting to hide Hemraj's body etc.) Besides, the CBI argued, that the cuts on the victims' necks were "surgical" and could have been only made by professional trained experts, and the blunt injury appeared to have been caused by a golf club. The CBI also repeated the points earlier made by the police, such as force-less entry into Aarushi's room, Rajesh's alleged diversionary tactics, avoidance in providing the terrace key, refusal to identify the dead body as that of Hemraj, attempts to remove references to sexual assault in the post-mortem report etc.

Thadarai, Rajkumar and Mandal

The CBI exonerated the three men for the reasons mentioned earlier: the narco tests were unreliable, the three men had alibis, no evidence indicates that they visited the Talwars' residence on the day of the murders and even after Thadarai was arrested, Rajkumar and Mandal did not try to abscond etc.

Other intruders

The CBI ruled out involvement of intruders other than Thadarai, Rajkumar and Mandal, because there was no sign of forced entry in the house, and there was no known motive. In addition, the CBI argued that an outsider would not have bothered to dress up the crime scene or hide body of Hemraj by dragging it and covering it with a cooler panel.

Insufficient evidence

The CBI investigators were affected by the inability of the first responders (the UP police) to examine the crime scene properly and to collect the necessary evidence. Although CBI found circumstantial evidence against the parents, there were many gaps:

- No evidence shows that Hemraj was murdered in Aarushi's room
- Hemraj's blood was not found on parents' clothes.
- Murder weapons were not recovered. Rajesh's golf club was possibly used as the weapon, but no DNA or bloodstain could link it to the crime. Also, a team of experts had ruled that kukri cannot be ruled out as the weapon used for slitting the throats of the victims.
- The blood-soaked clothes of the murderers, the clothes used to allegedly clean the blood from the crime scene and the bed sheet allegedly used to drag Hemraj's body were not found.
- The fingerprints on the bloodstained Scotch whisky bottle could not be identified.
- The testimony of the Jalvayu Vihar security guards that they did not see anyone entering or leaving the house was not fool-proof.
- Scientific tests on Rajesh and Nupur do not conclusively indicate their involvement in the crime.
- The exact sequence of events between midnight and 6 am on 16 May is not clear.
- No evidence clearly shows an individual role of either Rajesh or Nupur in the crime.
- Absence of a clear-cut motive

Recommendation

CBI recommended that the case should be closed due to insufficient evidence.

The CBI officer AGL Kaul later revealed that he wanted to file a chargesheet against the parents for the murders, but his superiors Nilabh Kishore and Javed Ahmed decided to file a closure report due to insufficient evidence. Arun Kumar of the first CBI team was consulted before filing the closure report, and he stated that there was no evidence that linked the Talwars to the murder. The Talwars' relatives and their supporters alleged that all the CBI officers investigating the case were colleagues of the state police who botched the original investigation.

Since the report named Rajesh Talwar as a suspect, the Talwars criticized CBI for making "false and baseless" allegations against them; Nupur lamented that the CBI had condemned them for life. On 24 January 2011, a 29-year-old self-proclaimed vigilante Utsav Sharma assaulted Rajesh Talwar with a meat cleaver in front of the court. Rajesh suffered deep cuts on his hands and the right side of his face. Sharma, who claimed to be upset at the slow pace of the case, had previously attacked former police chief S.P.S. Rathore of the Ruchika Girhotra Case. Nupur accused the CBI of "unleashing mob" on her family, and criticized the media commentary on the case.

On 30 January 2011, people gathered at Jantar Mantar demanding justice for Aarushi. The protest was attended by activists including those from the Middle Finger Protests group who held banners that read, "CBI - Congress Bureau of Injustice" and "CBI - Congress Bureau of Investigation".

== The case against the Talwars ==
In January 2011, the Talwars filed a petition protesting against the CBI's attempt to close the case. However, their petition was rejected by the magistrate Preeti Singh of the special CBI court in Ghaziabad. On 9 February 2011, she converted the CBI closure report into a charge sheet, and summoned Rajesh and Nupur as the accused. The Talwars moved the Allahabad High Court and then the Supreme Court, petitioning against being summoned and proceedings being initiated against them. However, both the courts rejected their pleas.

The formal trial began from 11 May 2013. CBI was represented by senior advocate Siddharth Luthra. The Talwars were defended by the former solicitor-general Harish Salve, Mukul Rohatgi and Rebecca Mammen John, all of whom worked pro bono. The defence lawyers focused on opposing the clean chit given to Thadarai, Rajkumar and Mandal; providing counter-arguments to the points that raised suspicions on their clients; and pointing out lapses in the investigation. The Talwars were given access to the witness statements and the photographs on which CBI was relying for prosecution. However, they were not given access to the polygraph, narco-analysis and brain-mapping test reports of Thadarai, Rajkumar and Mandal. The Talwars also objected to the CBI's claim that the narco tests on the three men were unreliable. They moved to the Supreme Court to seek these reports, but in October 2013, the Court rejected their plea on the grounds that such reports are inadmissible in evidence. The Court also stated that the Talwars were adopting delaying tactics, citing the several applications filed by them at every stage. The CBI court also rejected the Talwars' plea to summon Anuj Arya and Nalini Singh to prove that the three men were present in Hemraj's room on the night.

In August 2012, the media reported that the CBI officer AGL Kaul had been using the e-mail ID hemraj.jalvayuvihar for the CBI's official communication with the Talwars, under the name "Hemraj Singh". CBI initially denied these allegations, but later admitted that the email ID was created for some "specific purpose" which they refused to explain. The journalist Avirook Sen alleged that this was a crude pressure tactic against the Talwars, since they were forced to respond to the mails purportedly coming from someone named "Hemraj".

The Talwars asked for a touch DNA test to analyze the palm print found on the terrace, and the Scotch whisky bottle. The Talwars also asked for a touch DNA test on the golf club that was allegedly used as the murder weapon. They even offered to pay for these tests. The CBI consulted J Nagaraju, a molecular genetics scientist (and director of the Centre for DNA Fingerprinting and Diagnostics, which conducted the DNA testing for the Aarushi case). Nagaraju dismissed the reliability of the LCN DNA technology and the possibility of it yielding any fresh evidence. The Supreme Court rejected the Talwars' appeal, and refused to order any further investigation.

In August 2012, the CFSL DNA scientist BK Mahapatra claimed that he had found male DNA on Aarushi's pillow, leading credence to the theory that Hemraj was present in her room. However, the CBI later clarified that Mahapatra's claim was wrong. The pillow was from Hemraj's room; it was a part of "Parcel 21", which had been collected from the Talwars' house on 1 June 2008. The defence argued that the CBI had deliberately created this misunderstanding to frame the Talwars.

Also in September, the CBI tried to debunk the claim that the parents could not have heard the outside happenings because of the air conditioner's noise. It claimed that a portion of the wall between the couple's room and Aarushi's room was made of a plywood partition. It also alleged that after the murders, the Talwars hired a painter named Shohrat, who painted the partition with a colour matching the other walls of Aarushi's room. Shohrat testified that Rajesh asked him to paint the wooden partition with a wall-matching color twice - once in 2009 and again on 19 April 2010. He also stated that Rajesh asked him to remove the outermost grill gate along with the iron grill on the balcony, both of which were in good shape. The CBI implied that the parents were trying to tamper with the evidence. The Talwars branded this claim as false, saying that the rooms were separated by a brick wall that had a plywood lamination over it. The defence also stated that Shohrat had been hired to paint the entire apartment, not just the partition. Besides, the painting was done in July 2009, more than a year after the murders, and when the apartment was vacant. The Talwars also stated that they possessed e-mails from CBI that granted them the permission to renovate the apartment.

In its 2010 closure report, the CBI had stated the sequence of events on the night of the murders was unclear. However, after the court asked the Talwars to be charged with the murders, the CBI investigator AGL Kaul narrated the following possible sequence of events during his cross-examination in the court, in April 2013:

Possible sequence of events according to CBI Additional SP AGL Kaul
- Rajesh heard some noise and went to Hemraj's room.
- He did not find Hemraj in his room, but heard some noise coming from Aarushi's room. He picked up a golf club stick from Hemraj's room and rushed to Aarushi's room.
- He saw Aarushi and Hemraj in an objectionable position on Aarushi's bed.
- In a fit of anger, Rajesh hit Hemraj's head with the golf club. When he tried to hit him a second time, Hemraj moved and Aarushi was hit instead.
- Awakened by the noise, Nupur Talwar came to Aarushi's room. By this time, both the victims were near-dead.
- The parents decided to hide Hemraj's body in order to dispose of it at a more opportune time. They wrapped his body in a bed sheet and dragged him to the terrace. They slit his throat and covered the body with a cooler panel.
- Then they came to Aarushi's room, dressed-up the crime scene and also slit her throat to ensure that the wounds on the two bodies looked similar.
- They then cleaned the blood stains on the floor. They also collected all the blood-stained clothes and the sharp-edged weapon in order to dispose of them.
- They then walked out of the flat, latched the middle grill door from outside and entered the house through Hemraj's room, in order to mislead the investigators.
- Rajesh then drank Scotch whiskey.

=== Court verdict ===
On 25 November 2013, a special CBI court held Rajesh and Nupur Talwar guilty for the two murders. The Special Judge Shyam Lal convicted the couple for murder, destruction of evidence, misleading the probe and filing a wrong FIR. On 26 November 2013, they were sentenced to life imprisonment for the twin murders.

The Talwar family called the verdict a miscarriage of justice, and alleged that the points proving innocence of Rajesh and Nupur were not produced by the CBI before the court. Journalist Avirook Sen alleged that the judge wrote the case verdict even before the defence side finished their arguments. In January 2014, the Talwars challenged the decision in the Allahabad High Court.

On 12 October 2017, the High Court acquitted the Talwars of all charges, stating that the evidence presented by the CBI against the Talwars was not satisfactory beyond reasonable doubt, and therefore they must be given benefit of the doubt instead of being convicted based solely on suspicion. The High Court castigated the CBI for its theory on the murder of domestic help Hemraj in the Aarushi murder case, saying it was an "impossible hypothesis" and "patently absurd". The verdict was criticized as unjust by Hemraj's wife Khumkala, and her brother Ashok Bhushal. Hemraj's family members and relatives in Nepal continue to believe that the Talwars are guilty.

A book analyzing the trial court verdict titled 'The Killing of Aarushi and the Murder of Justice' critiques the judgment as well as the quality of evidence that was tendered in the case. It also argues that the Aarushi case holds up a mirror to similar cases of injustice in thousands of other criminal cases in India.

On 8 March 2018, the CBI challenged the acquittal in the Supreme Court, and on 10 August, the Supreme Court admitted the CBI's appeal, a leave to appeal decision which allowed the earlier appeal decision to be reconsidered by India's highest court.

== Public attention ==
After the discovery of Hemraj's body, the case attracted public attention as a bizarre whodunit. The speculations about a sexual relationship between a teenage girl and her male servant provided material for yellow journalism, as did the allegations about the extra-marital affair of Aarushi's father. The critics argued that the alleged tabloid journalism by an overzealous media, along with the police's missteps, had "prejudiced the course of justice". On 22 July 2008, a Supreme Court bench consisting of Justice Altamas Kabir and Justice Markandey Katju asked the media to be careful in its coverage of the case, and abstain from making baseless allegations doubting the character of Aarushi or her father. It criticised the "sensationalist" media reports as lacking in "sensitivity, taste and decorum". On 25 July, the Ghaziabad court judge objected to the "inhuman treatment" of Thadarai, Rajkumar and Mandal by the police.

In 2012, while lodged in the Dasna Jail, Nupur Talwar expressed her wish to write a book on the case, titled Mystery behind Aarushi's murder - A Tale of Unfortunate Mother. However, the jail authorities seized the 17 pages written by her, stating that she would need to seek permission from the court to write a book on the under-trial case.

Rajesh Talwar's sister-in-law Vandana Talwar, along with her other relatives and friends, launched a campaign to prove the innocence of the Talwars. Through the website www.justiceforaarushitalwar.com, the group blamed CBI for goof-ups in investigation. Vandana also created a Facebook page, a Twitter account and sent e-mails proclaiming the parents' innocence.

== In popular culture ==
In 2008, Balaji Telefilms decided to depict an "inspired" version of the murder case on their soap opera Kahaani Ghar Ghar Ki. Nupur Talwar requested the National Commission for Protection of Child Rights (NCPCR) to stop Balaji Telefilms from airing the show, saying that the production house was trying to earn TRPs by exploiting a tragedy. However, the production house refused to change the script.

The 2015 film Rahasya (mystery) was inspired by the twin murders. Talvar, another 2015 film, written by Vishal Bhardwaj and directed by Meghna Gulzar, is also based on the Aarushi-Hemraj murder case. Resembling in treatment Akira Kurosawa's 1950 Japanese film Rashomon, Talvar depicts three contradictory accounts of the case, including the parents' version.

Journalist Avirook Sen has written a book titled Aarushi, released in 2015. The book argues that Aarushi's parents are the victims of a miscarriage of justice.

A digital content company, Arré created a 8 episode podcast about this case titled Trial By Error: The Aarushi Files. Produced by Delhi-based film-making collective Jamun, the podcast aired on Arré and Saavn on a weekly basis from 1st May to 10th June in 2016.

The 2017 Tamil language movie Nibunan features a plot in which a young girl and a family servant are murdered by the girl's parents for having an affair. This story is seemingly inspired by Aarushi-Hemraj murder case.

In October 2017, a four-part investigative documentary series Aarushi - Beyond Reasonable Doubt, which explores the arguments and circumstances of the case, its investigations, and the remaining unresolved questions, premiered on Channel NewsAsia. Commissioned by Channel NewsAsia, it was produced by StoryTeller Films.

In November 2017 a Star World original production in association with HBO Asia released a crime documentary mini series called The Talwars: Behind Closed Doors.
