= Podbharti =

Indian podcast

- Podbharti Logo
- Genre: Society and Culture
- Language: Hindi

Cast and voices
- Hosted by: Debashish Chakrabarty, Shashi Singh

Publication
- Original release: May 2007
- Updates: Infrequent

Related
- Website: podbharati.com

Podbharti is a popular Indian podcast show and the first Hindi podzine. It leads the pack of Indian podcasts along with Podmasti and Podbazaar.

== Background ==
Podbharti provides coverage of News & Views about Indian Blogosphere, Indian language blogging, Tools & technology reviews, Indian Culture and the Entertainment Industry. It was co-founded by Indian blogger duo Debashish Chakrabarty (better known as founder of the Indibloggies) and Shashi Singh. Listeners have equated the experience of listening to the podcasts to 70's style radio, reminiscent of Vividh Bharti. The podcast content has a touch of journalism to it.

The first episode of Podbharti was released in May 2007 in which they presented a retrospective talk on Hindi blogging completing 4 years, a nipping primer on the Hindi Transliteration tool introduced by Google in the Blogger.com service and a report on a controversy in the Hindi blogdom where discussions on communalism took an ugly turn adding bitterness to the whole debate.

Apart from downloading podcasts on music devices, users can also hear them online on Podbharti's website.

== See also ==
- Podcasting in India
- Indian Blogosphere
- Hindi Blogosphere
