= Dharam Sankat Mein =

- Directed by: Fuwad Khan
- Written by: Screenplay & Dialogues: Sanjay Sharma; Vijay Desai; Vedish; Alpesh Dixit
- Story by: David Baddiel
- Based on: The Infidel by Josh Appignanesi
- Produced by: Sajjad Chunawala; Shariq Patel
- Starring: Paresh Rawal; Naseeruddin Shah; Annu Kapoor
- Cinematography: Anshuman Mahaley
- Edited by: Apurva Asrani
- Music by: Songs: Meet Bros Anjjan; Jatinder Shah; Sachin Gupta; Background Score: Sachin Gupta
- Production companies: Viacom 18 Motion Pictures; Trigno Media
- Release date: 10 April 2015
- Running time: 129 minutes
- Country: India
- Language: Hindi

Dharam Sankat Mein (transl. crisis of faith) is a 2015 Indian comedy drama film directed by cinematographer Fuwad Khan in his debut and produced by Sajjad Chunawala and Shariq Patel under the Trigno Media banner in association with Viacom 18 Motion Pictures, which also serves as distributor. An official remake of the 2010 British film The Infidel starring comedian Omid Djalili as the titular lead, the film features Paresh Rawal, Annu Kapoor and Naseeruddin Shah in pivotal roles, and tells the story of an ordinary Hindu man who discovers that he was originally a born Muslim, and in order to meet his biological father, must learn how to come across in the least as a true Muslim.

Dharam Sankat Mein released on 10 April 2015, and received mixed reviews from critics.

== Plot ==
Dharampal Trivedi (Paresh Rawal), a caterer by profession, lives in a Gujarati Hindu household in Ahmedabad with his wife and two grown children, of which his elder son requests him to fix his engagement with a girl of his choice from a strict Hindu cult. Extremely derisive towards Muslims, he starts his days with the old songs of a Punjabi Sikh pop singer Manjeet Manchala (Gippy Grewal), who has now stopped producing albums and disappeared mysteriously. Besides, he has regular arguments with a Muslim neighbour, Nawab Mehmood Nazim Ali Shah Khan Bahadur (Annu Kapoor). One day, Dharampal visits his late mother's bank vault to collect her belongings. He then finds adoption papers certifying he was adopted in 1960. He then glancing all the details decides to get the details of his biological parents and visits the orphanage from where he was adopted to discover himself to be biologically muslim and born in a muslim family. This shocks him, considering how much he dislikes Muslims, and he decides to keep this a secret. Eventually, he admits to Nawab that he is also a Muslim, and that he must find his real father, Meer Shaukat Ali, in order to speak to him. They discover that Meer is in a critical condition due to old age, living in a senior home. The Imaam taking care of Meer tells Dharampal that if Meer saw that his only son has been brought up as a non-Muslim, it could cause severe damage to his health. Therefore, he tells Dharampal to learn how to become a true Muslim and come back to meet Meer once he is ready.

With the help of Shah, Dharampal begins to learn the ways of Muslim people. However, the Imaam declines Dharampal's request to meet Meer once again, claiming he is still not coming across as a true Muslim. Meanwhile, Dharampal's son, Amit, falls in love with a young girl named Shraddha and in order to marry her, he must have her father accept him and his family. Shraddha's father is a devout follower of a spiritual godman named Neelanand (Naseeruddin Shah). Seeking to help him impress Shraddha's father, Amit asks Dharampal to also follow Neelanand and become spiritual. However, on one occasion, Dharampal ends up admitting publicly that he is a born Muslim. Dharampal's family and Shraddha's father witness this, and Neelanand advises Shraddha's father not to have Shraddha marry Amit. Due to this, Dharampal's family leave him. A case is lodged against Dharampal for offending Muslims, and in the court, the Imaam serves as a character witness of how Dharampal detests Islam. His witness backfires when Nawaab, now Dharampal's attorney, accuses the Imaam of trying to wrongfully convert Dharampal to Islam.

The court gives permission to Dharampal to see an ailing Meer. However, before they arrive at the senior home, Meer has already died. Furious over the whole situation, Dharampal tries to bring down Neelanand, the main cause of most of his troubles. He then accidentally discovers that Neelanand's eye twitches due to a very rare abnormality causing contraction of the eyelid, which Manchala also suffered from. This reminds Dharampal that Manchala had disappeared years ago, and then matches the voices of Manchala and Neelanand, confirming they are the same person. He then crashes an event of Neelanand and reveals to a large audience how Neelanand is actually a born Sikh and has been a fraud and characterless pop-singer with various cases lodged against him for adulterous relationships with many women. He gives a speech on how the religion a person follows should not matter as long as they are acting rightfully. Dharampal's family finally returns to him and Amit is allowed to marry Sharaddha.

== Cast ==
- Paresh Rawal as Dharampal Trivedi
  - Sunny Agarwal as young Dharampal
- Annu Kapoor as Nawab Mehmood Shah
- Naseeruddin Shah as Neelanand Baba / Manjeet Manchala
  - Gippy Grewal as young Manjeet Manchala (special appearance)
- Alka Kaushal as Indira "Indu" Trivedi, Dharampal's wife
- Manoj Raghubir Sharma as Amit Trivedi, Dharampal's son
- Rushita Pandya as Antara Trivedi, Dharampal's daughter
- Auritra Ghosh as Shraddha Pandya, Amit's lover
- Jagdish Rajpurohit as Vishesh M. Bhatt
- Mukesh S. Bhatt as Panditji
- Hazel Keech in a special appearance in the song "Tu Takke"
- Sophie Choudry in a special appearance in the song "Do You Know Baby"

== Neel Dharma promotion ==
Viacom 18 Motion Pictures launched an teaser campaign to promote the film. Using Naseeruddin Shah's character of Neelanand Baba, they created pseudo religion called Neel Dharma. Neel Dharma had its own website, Facebook page and Twitter account. Dharam Sankat Mein also used WhatsApp in its mobile promotion. It is the first time a Bollywood film has 3 National Film Award and Filmfare Award winners in its main cast.

== Soundtrack ==
The film's music was composed by Meet Bros Anjjan, Sachin Gupta, Jatinder Shah, Kaptan Laadi while lyrics are by Kumar.

| No. | Title | Singer(s) | Length |
|---|---|---|---|
| 1. | "Tu Takke" | Gippy Grewal, Khushboo Grewal, Meet Bros Anjjan | 3:53 |
| 2. | "Shiv Tandav" | Aman Trikha | 2:01 |
| 3. | "Tu Takke MBA Swag (Remix)" | Gippy Grewal, Khushboo Grewal, Meet Bros Anjjan | 3:34 |
| 4. | "Neelanand" | Sachin Gupta, Ravi Chowdhary | 3:14 |
| 5. | "Allah Hoo (Ravi Chowdhary Version)" | Sachin Gupta, Ravi Chowdhary | 5:15 |
| 6. | "Allah Hoo (Pardeep Sran Version)" | Sachin Gupta, Pradeep Sran | 5:12 |
| 7. | "Do You Know Baby" | Gippy Grewal | 2:31 |
| 8. | "Neelanand (Remix)" | Sachin Gupta, Ravi Chowdhary | 2:05 |
| Total length: | | | 27:15 |
