= A.I.SHA =

Indian television series

- Genre: Science fiction Drama; Thriller; Mystery
- Written by: Harman Singha; Raghu Ram; Shiv Singh
- Screenplay by: Abhash Singh (Dialogues)
- Directed by: Sahir Raza; Ajay Bhuyan (Season 3)
- Starring: Harman Singha; Ruslaan Mumtaz; Nimisha Mehta; Raghu Ram; Auritra Ghosh; Flora Saini; Adesh Sidhu; Sameer Sharma; Manav Kaul; Rashi Mal; Meherzan Mazda; Aahana Kumra
- Country of origin: India
- Original languages: Hindi (main language); English telugu (one season)
- No. of seasons: 3
- No. of episodes: 19

Production
- Producers: B. Saikumar; Ravi Luthria; Rajiv Laxman; Raghu Ram
- Production locations: India, Mumbai
- Cinematography: Sidhant Chowdhry (Season 3)
- Editors: Abhimanyu Sengupta (Season 1); Shlok Bhandari (Season 2); Abhishek Shekhawat (Season 3)

Original release
- Network: Arre (brand)
- Release: 9 April 2016 – 9 April 2019

A.I.SHA My Virtual Girlfriend is an Indian drama-mystery, digital science fiction thriller streaming television series by Arré. The series revolves around the story of a relationship between Sam (Harman Singha), a genius app developer, and a woman. Only, the woman is the first-of-its-kind Artificial Intelligence Simulated Humanoid Assistant (A.I.SHA). Things take a turn for the worse when A.I.SHA (Nimisha Mehta) develops a mind of her own.

The first season consists of seven episodes. In July 2016, it was announced the series had been renewed for a second season and premiered on 23 March 2017. The First episode of the third season was premiered on 4 March 2019, and streamed on arre.co.in, the Arré app, and MX Player.

== Plot ==
Sam is a 26-year-old genius app developer working at Future Lens. He is a loner, who falls hopelessly in love with a colleague Kriti (Auritra Ghosh), he can't bring himself to even talk to. Sid (Raghu Ram), his boss, is an out-and-out megalomaniac who makes Sam's life a living hell. With both his work and social life unsteady, Sam puts all his effort into the creation of a true artificial intelligence program, an autonomous virtual assistant whom he calls ‘Aisha’. He's out to prove to the world that he is the greatest Artificial Intelligence app developer but things take a turn for the worse when Siddhu, his only friend, threatens him about A.I.SHA (Nimisha Mehta) and everything hits rock bottom when AISHA falls madly in love with Sam.

== Cast and characters ==
- Harman Singha/Ruslaan Mumtaz as Sameer Luthra
- Nimisha Mehta as A.I.SHA
- Raghu Ram as Siddharth Babbar
- Aahana Kumra as Shivi Malhotra
- Auritra Ghosh as Kriti
- Flora Saini as Mariyam James
- Adesh Sidhu as Siddhu and Cyrus
- Sameer Sharma as Adil Sheikh
- Manav Kaul as Professor Kishore Saraswat
- Rashi Mal as Abby
- Meherzan Mazda as Faiz
- Bhavin Bhanushali as Rishi
- Aman Bhagat as Raj
- Nasir Abdullah as Kulkarni

== Reception ==
The series has received critical acclaim for the authenticity is maintains when it comes to portraying cybercrime.

The second season premiered across Arre's Android and iOS app, on its website and its partner platforms including Facebook, YouTube, SonyLIV, YuppTV, Vodafone Play and now, even on a Jet Airways flight. A French TV channel TF1 Xtra has picked up the show and does frequent reruns. The show has also found a platform in Vodafone Play and Ola Play and has been translated into Tamil and Telugu to reach a wider audience.

== Accolades ==
A.I.SHA has won the best overall web series and best suspense/thriller at South Florida WebFest in Miami. The show had been selected from among a selected screening of the best 27 global web series and short films that were shortlisted.

Arré's first web series A.I.SHA | My Virtual Girlfriend won five awards at the recently held LA Web Festival for Best Series, Best Editing, Best Direction, Best Actress and Best Overall Premise within the Drama Category, from among a selected shortlist of 35 web series across the world. The series was also nominated for Best Sound Design, Visual Effects, Outstanding Score, Cinematography, Supporting Actor, Best Actor and Writing.
