= YuppTV =

TV content provider in India

- Company type: Private
- Website type: Web portal
- Available in: Telugu, Tamil, Marathi, Hindi, Bengali, Sinhalese, Kannada, Malayalam, Punjabi, Gujarati, Odia, and English
- Founded: 2006; 20 years ago
- Headquarters: Atlanta, Georgia, United States; Hyderabad, Telangana, India
- Key people: Uday Reddy (CEO)
- Industry: Internet services
- Services: Live TV, catch-up TV, TV shows, movies
- Registration: Optional

YuppTV is first over-the-top (OTT) content provider in India including live television and films with recording and storage features. YuppTV allows broadcasters and content providers to reach an audience, and allows consumers to view content on up to six screens of connected TVs, STBs, PC, smartphones, tablets and game consoles.

== Cricket ==
YuppTV has acquired the digital media rights for the 2021 Indian Premier League in Australia, Sri Lanka, Nepal, Japan, Bhutan, Maldives, Central Asia, Continental Europe, Central & South America, and Southeast Asia (except Malaysia, Singapore).

It also purchased the media rights for broadcasting 2023 Cricket World Cup.

== Services ==
Headquartered in Atlanta and Hyderabad, YuppTV offers 300+ TV channels in 15 languages: Tamil, Telugu, Hindi, Malayalam, Kannada, Marathi, Bengali, Punjabi, Odia, Gujarati, Sinhala, Bengali, Nepali, and English.

== Partnerships ==
In July 2016, YuppTV joined hands with Mumbai-based content platform Arre to distribute content on its YuppTV Bazaar platform. In March 2022, YuppTV entered into a partnership with Prasar Bharati to help the latter widen its reach.
