= Reunion (advertisement) =

Google India advertisement for Google Search

- Agency: Ogilvy & Mather India
- Client: Google
- Language: Hindi-Urdu; English
- Running time: 212 seconds (3:32)
- Product: Google Search
- Release dates: 13 November 2013 (YouTube); 15 November 2013 (Television)
- Directed by: Amit Ravindernath Sharma
- Music by: Clinton Cerejo (composer); Neelesh Jain (lyrics); Piyush Mishra (singer)
- Starring: Vishwa Mohan Badola Mysore Shrinivas Sathyu Auritra Ghosh Syed Shabahat Ali
- Production company: Chrome Pictures
- Country: India

"Reunion" is a 2013 Google India advertisement for Google Search. It was directed by Amit Sharma, written by Sukesh Kumar Nayak, produced by an Indian branch of Ogilvy & Mather, and published on YouTube on 13 November 2013. "Reunion" is about the fictional reunion between two elderly men, Baldev Mehra (Vishwa Mohan Badola) from India and Yusuf (Mysore Shrinivas Sathyu) from Pakistan, who were separated as children during the partition of India in 1947.

The advertisement had a strong impact in both India and Pakistan, leading to hope for the easing of travel restrictions between the two countries. It went viral and was viewed more than 1.6 million times before officially debuting on television on 15 November 2013.

== Sequence ==
Baldev Mehra (Vishwa Mohan Badola) is an elderly Hindu man in Delhi, India, and Yusuf (Mysore Shrinivas Sathyu) is an elderly Muslim man in Lahore, Pakistan. One day Baldev shows his granddaughter Suman (Auritra Ghosh) an old, dated photograph of two children. He tells her that it is himself and his best friend Yusuf when they lived in Lahore prior to the Partition of India in 1947. In front of his house there was a park with a gate made in the stone age and each evening he and Yusuf would fly kites there and "steal" Jhajariyas from Yusuf's family sweet shop. When Partition came, however, Baldev and his family had to leave for India overnight. Many decades later, Baldev still thinks of Yusuf and misses him.

Using details of her grandfather's story, Suman is able to locate Yusuf's sweet shop in Lahore via her laptop and Google. She connects with his grandson Ali (Syed Shabahat Ali) who helps her to plan a surprise visit from Yusuf on Baldev's birthday.

This is the first of a sequence of five ads showing the two old friends reconnecting. The idea and storyline may have been inspired by the 2012 short film, Respect, by Taha Kirmani.

== Cast ==
- Mysore Shrinivas Sathyu as Yusuf
- Vishwa Mohan Badola as Baldev Mehra
- Auritra Ghosh as Suman
- Syed Shabahat Ali as Ali

== Production ==
According to Sukesh Kumar Nayak, Group Creative Director of Ogilvy Mumbai, Google had stated in their brief that "the only thing they wanted was to see [...] how meaningful the search engine is in real life." Nayak also stated that they wanted to make "the connection between real life and Google, magical." "Reunion" was filmed "in different areas in Delhi, including an old Haveli in Connaught Place, Red Fort, India Gate, and a small scene in Lahore, Pakistan." Singer Clinton Cerejo composed the music for the spot.

== Reception ==
The Star notes that "Reunion" has "gone viral online, reflecting demands in the two countries for closer people-to-people ties [....] Internet users left thousands of comments on social networking sites describing how the advert had brought them to tears and renewed their hopes for improved relations between the two neighbours." Max Fisher of The Washington Post states that "if you are from South Asia, have family from South Asia, or are merely friends on Facebook with someone who has ties to the subcontinent, you've already seen this video posted to social media in the 48 hours since it went up. In case you haven't, it's a Google advertisement, about three and a half minutes, well worth your time. Yes, it's an ad, meant to prod people in one of the world's largest markets into using Google services. And in that context it can be a bit syrupy. But take a step back for a moment, and try to appreciate what makes this video so powerful that it's already been viewed 1.8 million times." India Today states that "the new Google ad, titled 'Reunion', touches the raw nerves that linger dormant under the skin of those who were separated during the heady days of Partition [….] While this may have been only an ad, there are many people both in Pakistan and India who will be able to relate to this emotional ad." Affan Chowdhry of The Globe and Mail states that "with nearly a million YouTube views over two days, a new Google ad that tells the story of two old friends reuniting after six decades of separation following the creation of India and Pakistan in 1947 has touched a deep nerve for many South Asians." Nilanjana Bhowmick of Time observes that "despite the tensions between the governments of India and Pakistan, this commercial, released by Google India on Wednesday, makes the point that the personal connections between Indians and Pakistanis run deep." Journalist Beena Sarwar states that "if it doesn’t move you, you’ve got a heart of stone." Sunny Peter of the International Business Times argues that "at a time when governments in both countries continue to be suspicious of each other's intent, the Google video comes as a welcome relief. [If only] the visa regime between both the countries was as easy as Google search." Mrigaa Sethi of Quartz talks about her family's experience with partition, noting that "Google’s India office has created a tear-jerker ad that is deeply resonant for Indians and Pakistanis with family stories like mine. It shows an aging Hindu Indian man waxing nostalgic to his granddaughter about his Muslim childhood friend in Lahore before the partition [....] The ad, created by Ogilvy, has struck a particularly emotional chord by refusing to take India and Pakistan’s historically adversarial relationship as a given."

== See also ==
- Opposition to the partition of India
