= Jhajariya =

Indian sweet dish

Jhajhariya
- Place of origin: India
- Region or state: Rajasthan
- Main ingredients: Maize, milk, ghee, sugar, raisins, nuts

Jhajhariya is a delicacy made of corn, milk, ghee and sugar garnished with raisins and nuts. Grated or coarsely ground fresh sweet corn is slowly roasted in ghee for few hours until it loses most of its moisture and assumes a dry granular form.

The confection was referenced in a 2013 advertisement for Google entitled Reunion.
