= Nimisha Mehta =

British actress

- Born: 1988 or 1989 (age 36–37); Ahmedabad, Gujarat, India
- Citizenship: United Kingdom
- Occupations: Actress; model
- Years active: 2016–present

Nimisha Mehta is a British actress, model and dancer, of Indian descent, working in the Hindi film industry. She made her Hindi film debut in Days of Tafree (2016) (remake of Gujarati hit film Chhello Divas). She is also known for her work as Aisha in the television series A.I.SHA My Virtual Girlfriend.

== Early life and background ==
Mehta was born in 1988 or 1989 in Ahmedabad, Gujarat to parents Viren and Nilma. They all moved to London when she was 2 years old. She has an older sister named Krupali Shah. Nimisha did her schooling in London and graduated in BA Hons LLB Law from University of Westminster with an upper second class degree. Alongside her studies, she kept herself busy with modelling and acting in London. She was crowned Miss India London 2013, part of the Miss India Worldwide pageant.

== Career ==
She has acted in There Will Be Tomorrow, a short English film directed by Bhushan Gaur (from New York Film Academy), acting opposite Sahil Salathia. The film was awarded at the HIV World Congress 2016 in Goa.

Mehta made her Hindi film debut as Pooja in the 2016 comedy feature film Days of Tafree, a remake of Gujarati hit film Chhello Divas. The actress has also starred in two series of the web science fiction thriller series A.I.SHA My Virtual Girlfriend.

== Filmography ==
Year	Title	Role	Notes	Ref
2016	Shockers		Disney+ Hotstar web series	
2016	Days of Tafree	Priya		
2016–2019	A.I.SHA My Virtual Girlfriend	A.I.SHA	Arre web series	
2016–2020	Four More Shots Please!	Myra	4 Episodes	
2019	Jhootha Kahin Ka	Riya Mehta		
2021	Aapkey Kamrey Mein Koi Rehta Hai	Tarini	MX Player web series	
