= Trial By Error: The Aarushi Files =

Indian true crime podcast

- Genre: Investigative Audio Drama
- Language: English

Creative team
- Written by: Nishita Jha

Cast and voices
- Hosted by: Nishita Jha

Production
- Length: 20 minutes

Technical specifications
- Audio format: MP3

Publication
- No. of seasons: 1
- No. of episodes: 8
- Original release: 1 May – 10 July 2016
- Provider: Arre

Related
- Website: www.arre.co.in/series/aarushi/

Trial by Error: The Aarushi Files is an investigative audio drama podcast series that covers the Noida double murder case.

== Content ==
The podcast is an eight-part series co-written and hosted by journalist Nishita Jha. Adapted from Avirook Sen's book Aarushi, the podcast narrates the unfolding of the Noida double murder case and its subsequent investigation in the format of interviews and thematic discussions. The first episode aired on 1 May 2016 and has since aired weekly. The series is produced by New Delhi-based film-making collective Jamun and is aired by digital content company, Arré, and music streaming service Saavn.

== Episodes ==
No.	Title	Length (mm:ss)	Original release date
1	"Rumours"	20:07	1 May 2016
"This episode examines how rumours tainted the investigation."
2	"The Others"	18:55	8 May 2016
"Suspicion turned to Hemraj when Aarushi was found dead, but when Hemraj's body was discovered, it became a closed-door mystery."
3	"Tafteesh"	20:28	15 May 2016
"Talwar house was a treasure trove of clues. Everything the investigators needed, was right there. But all was overlooked or botched."
4	"CBI Team 1"	19:36	22 May 2016
"CBI takes over and tries to make sense out of the botched investigation. Another mystery unfolds and soon after, they are replaced."
5	"CBI Team 2"	21:37	5 June 2016
"The CBI Team 2 was not interested in finding new evidence. Instead, they went back to UP Police's investigation."
6	"The Scoop"	24:17	12 June 2016
"Aarushi's mother did not cry while on an interview. Hence the Noida murders became a source of entertainment instead of just news."
7	"In Court"	22:34	19 June 2016
"Inconclusive CBI report, dubious witnesses and mystery of pillowcases: The trial of the murders was as strange as the case had been."
8	"Today"	22:55	10 July 2016
"Justice has formally been served in the Aarushi-Hemraj case. But even a cursory look at it today reveals the cracks in the system."

== See also ==
- Podcasting in India
