= Avirook Sen =

Indian writer and journalist (born 1968)

- Born: Kolkata, India
- Occupations: Writer, journalist

Avirook Sen is a writer and journalist from Gurgaon, Haryana, India. His book Aarushi showcased the 2008 Noida double murder case.

== Biography ==
Sen was born in Kolkata in a Bengali family. He completed his high school from La Martiniere school, pursued a bachelor's degree in English literature from Presidency University, Kolkata

He started his career as a journalist in 1990, worked with ABP Group, thereafter, worked with India Today, the Hindustan Times and other newspapers, and wrote extensively on topics such as social, crime, terrorism, and sports.

Sen published his debut book, Looking for America, with in 2012. His sophomore book, Aarushi, is a true crime book published in 2015 by Penguin India. The book showcases the 2008 Noida double murder case, and the insensitivity of the judiciary, claimed that Aarushi Talwar murder verdict was a miscarriage of justice. As of August 24, 2025, Aarushi has sold upto 70,000 copies in India.

Sen was invited to speak on various events.

== Books ==
- Looking for America (2012)
- Aarushi (2015)

== See also ==
- Trial By Error: The Aarushi Files
