= Jhootha Kahin Ka =

2019 Indian Hindi-language comedy-drama film

- Theatrical poster
- Directed by: Smeep Kang
- Written by: Shreya Srivastava; Vaibhav Suman
- Based on: Akkineni Sumanth & Raj Tarun's Abbadham Cheppevaadu
- Produced by: Deepak Mukut; Anuj Sharma; Vinay Gupta
- Starring: Rishi Kapoor; Jimmy Sheirgill; Lillete Dubey; Sunny Singh; Omkar Kapoor; Manoj Joshi; Nimisha Mehta; Pujita Ponnada
- Cinematography: Akashdeep Pandey
- Edited by: Ashfaque Makrani
- Music by: Yo Yo Honey Singh; Amjad Nadeem-Aamir; Sanjeev-Ajay; Rahul Jain; Kashi Richard; Sidhant Madhav
- Production companies: Soham Rockstar Entertainment; Shantketan Entertainments; VinR Films
- Distributed by: Soham Rockstar Entertainment
- Release date: 19 July 2019
- Running time: 133 minutes
- Country: India
- Language: Hindi
- Box office: est. ₹ 2.57 crore

Jhootha Kahin Ka (transl. What a liar) is a 2019 Indian Hindi-language comedy drama film directed by Smeep Kang, and produced by Deepak Mukut and Anuj Sharma and Vinay Gupta under the banners of Soham Rockstar Entertainment and Shantketan Entertainments. The film stars Rishi Kapoor, Jimmy Sheirgill, Lillete Dubey, Sunny Singh, Omkar Kapoor, Manoj Joshi, Pujita Ponnada and Nimisha Mehta, and follows the story of two boys Varun and Karan (Omkar and Sunny), who go to Mauritius for higher studies, where they change their lifestyle so much that they do not want to go back home. It was theatrically released in India on 19 July 2019.

== Plot ==
Yograj Singh is a farmer in Punjab who village life. He lives with his brother-in-law Kokey Singh. His son Varun is in Mauritius to study and loves it so much that he is reluctant to return home. Varun had come home for a vacation and was staying with Yograj, a retired police inspector and a widower.

Varun doesn't have a job even ten months after completing his studies but would not consider coming back to his village and helping Yograj with maintaining the farm. Yograj is angry at Varun's attitude that he dislikes village life so much. Varun returns to Mauritius the next day. In Mauritius, Varun stays with Karan (Sunny Singh), who is also from the same village.

Varun meets Riya at a wedding that they were both attending in Mauritius. Sonam lives with her parents Vinod, and Ruchi. Vinod is annoyed with Ruchi as she is into make-up and provocative dressing even at an age when her daughter is eligible for marriage.

Riya doesn't want to marry as she doesn't want to leave her disabled father, whom she loves. Varun says that he can stay with Riya as he has no parents, as they were lost many years ago and he has been trying to find them without any luck. Riya's parents love Varun and soon both are married off to each other.

Karan is dating Sonam. Sonam is pressing Karan to marry. Karan is hoping that his US returned brother Tommy will speak to Sonam's parents for their marriage. Actually, Tommy is recently released from central prison in Mauritius.

As Varun refuses to come to India, Yograj decides to come to Mauritius to start a new life with Kokey. He rents the bungalow next to Vinod. Vinod owns the bungalow and is technically Yograj's landlord. Varun is shocked to see this and fortunately Karan is with him. Vinod and Ruchi think that Karan is Yograj's son, while Yograj thinks that Karan is their son-in-law. Varun starts to live a double life spending time in both houses.

Varun gets up early in the morning and goes jogging, but instead spends time with Yograj. He then leaves to give interviews for a job, but instead spends time with Riya. In the evening, Varun creates a social commitment to leave the house, and again goes to meet Yograj. He goes to sleep in his room in Yograj's home, but then escapes through the window to return home to Riya and to sleep with her in her bed.

Varun uses the side gate connecting the two homes for nocturnal visits. The hitch is that the side gate makes a squeaky noise while unlocking. Every time Yograj comes over to investigate, but Kokey sees him and assumes that Yograj is interested in Ruchi and is hence looking to go over at odd times of the night.

Varun knows that his father-in-law suspects that his wife Ruchi is having affairs with former tenants. He flames those suspicions by having Ruchi and Yograj work together for a surprise anniversary party for Vinod. Vinod thinks they are having an affair and predictably, asks Yograj to vacate the bungalow. But Riya intervenes and clears the air by telling Vinod that Ruchi and Yograj were only planning his birthday party together.

Meanwhile, it is revealed that Yograj has a best friend in Mauritius, who is a jailer in town and Tommy was actually his prisoner. Khatter is pleased to know that Karan is Tommy's brother. Khatter is also Yograj's friend and he was the one who helped Yograj settle in Mauritius when he visited to meet Varun.

Tommy is pleased to learn from Khatter that Karan is wedded to Riya and will inherit Vinod and Ruchi's wealth. Tommy goes to meet Vinod and Ruchi, and when Karan finds out he asks Varun to act ignorant. Varun tells Vinod that he doesn't know Tommy and Tommy is thrown out of the house.

Karan feigns ignorance of why Tommy was mistreated at Vinod and Ruchi's house but agrees to the fact that they need to take revenge by getting Karan engaged to Sonam. Tommy agrees to talk to Sonam's parents to teach Riya's parents a lesson.

Meanwhile, Karan warns Sonam's parents to keep progressing the wedding talk with Tommy regardless of whatever he says. So, Tommy says all truth (he was in jail for fraud, Karan is married etc. etc.), but still Sonam's parents agree to marrying off Sonam to Karan the following month.

One night, through his window, Yograj sees Varun spending alone time with Riya. Yograj confronts Varun and tells him if he does not end his affair with Riya, he will return to India. Varun tells Karan about this, and they decide to further infuriate Yograj. Yograj is disgusted and decides to leave, but Khatter invites him to his son's wedding. Incidentally, Karan will simultaneously marry Sonam at the same venue.

Yograj calls Riya and her parents to the venue and stops the wedding. Tommy also arrives. There is massive confusion over who has married whom. Eventually Varun admits that Yograj is his father, and he had lied as he had told Riya's parents that he had no family.

== Cast ==
- Rishi Kapoor as Yograj Singh, Varun's father
- Jimmy Sheirgill as Tommy Pandey, Karan's brother
- Lillete Dubey as Ruchi Mehta (Riya's mother)
- Sunny Singh as Karan Pandey
- Omkar Kapoor as Varun Singh
- Manoj Joshi as Vinod Mehta (Riya's father)
- Nimisha Mehta as Riya Mehta
- Rucha Vaidya as Sonam
- Rajesh Sharma as Kokey Singh, Varun's maternal uncle
- Ashok Pathak as Tommy Pandey's sidekick
- Rakesh Bedi as Sonam's father
- Neelu Kohli as Sonam's mother
- Sunny Leone (special appearance in song "Funk Love")
- Nataša Stanković (special appearance in song "Saturday Night")

== Soundtrack ==
Jhootha Kahin Ka

Soundtrack album by Yo Yo Honey Singh, Amjad Nadeem-Aamir, Sanjeev-Ajay, Rahul Jain, Kashi Richard, Sidhant Madhav
- Released: 2019
- Recorded: 2019
- Genre: Feature film soundtrack
- Length: 17:40
- Language: Hindi
- Label: Zee Music Company
External audio
- Official Audio Jukebox on YouTube

The music of the film is composed by Yo Yo Honey Singh, Amjad Nadeem-Aamir, Sanjeev-Ajay, Rahul Jain, Kashi Richard, Sidhant Madhav while lyrics are written by Sanjeev Chaturvedi, Alok Ranjan Jha, Amjad Nadeem and Lil Golu.

Track listing
No.	Title	Lyrics	Music	Singer(s)	Length
1.	"Saturday Night"	Amjad Nadeem	Amjad Nadeem-Aamir	Neeraj Shridhar, Jyotica Tangri	3:52
2.	"Funk Love"	Lil Golu	Yo Yo Honey Singh	Yo Yo Honey Singh	3:58
3.	"Jhootha Kahin Ka"	Sanjeev Chaturvedi	Sanjeev-Ajay, Rahul Jain	Navraj Hans, Rahul Jain, Ankit Saainraj	2:20
4.	"Munde Da Character"	Sanjeev Chaturvedi	Siddhant Madhav, Sanjeev-Ajay	Brijesh Shandilya, Siddhant Madhav, Rani Indrani Sharma, Nazim Ali, Deepak Yadav, Makrand Patankar	4:23
5.	"Jugni"	Sanjeev Chaturvedi, Alok Ranjan Jha	Kashi Richard	Enbee, Kapil Thapa, Rohit Sharma, Chintan Bakiwala	3:07
Total length:					17:40

== Production ==
The film is shot in Punjab, Mauritius, and Mumbai.
