= Love Breakups Zindagi =

2011 Indian film by Sahil Sangha

- Theatrical Release Poster
- Directed by: Sahil Sangha
- Screenplay by: Sahil Sangha
- Story by: Sahil Sangha
- Produced by: Zayed Khan
- Starring: Zayed Khan; Dia Mirza; Cyrus Sahukar; Tisca Chopra; Satyadeep Mishra; Auritra Ghosh; Pallavi Sharda
- Cinematography: Aseem Bajaj
- Edited by: Rameshwar S. Bhagat
- Music by: Soundtracks: Salim–Sulaiman; Background Score: Clinton Cerejo
- Production company: Born Free Entertainment
- Distributed by: Sahara Motion Pictures
- Release date: 7 October 2011
- Country: India
- Language: Hindi
- Budget: ₹10 crore
- Box office: ₹2.06 crore

Love Breakups Zindagi (transl. Love Breakups Life) is a 2011 Indian Hindi-language romantic comedy film directed by Sahil Sangha and produced by Zayed Khan under the banner of Sahara Motion Pictures and Born Free Entertainment. It stars Zayed Khan and Dia Mirza in the lead roles. The music is composed by duo Salim–Sulaiman with the lyrics written by Javed Akhtar. The film was released on 7 October 2011.

== Plot ==
Jai (Zayed Khan) and Naina (Dia Mirza) are almost "settled" in their lives but missing something or someone who will complete them. Jai feels that magic and serendipity have passed him by. Naina is a successful photographer and has taught herself that a less-than-fulfilling life is enough for her. But is it?

Govind (Cyrus Sahukar) has a colourful past and is on his way to another major, seemingly all-wrong relationship. But what if this 'mistake' is the love he has been looking for all his life? Sheila (Tisca Chopra) has stayed single for a long time, waiting for Mr. Perfect. When he does appear, will she take her chance at love and look beyond the odds that divide to see what binds them in a perfect whole?

Ritu (Umang Jain) lives on breakups and ice cream. Will she ever find a man and share a beginning and not just a closure? Arjun (Satyadeep Mishra) and Gayatri (Auritra Ghosh) are the perfect couple on the brink of a dream wedding. Will their love inspire others to listen to their hearts? Dhruv (Vaibhav Talwar) and Radhika (Pallavi Sharda) are driven workaholics, ignoring the small text of their lives. Will they wake up to see what they have missed in their desire for everything?

The characters try to find personal truths, shed illusions, laugh, cry, grow, and learn that even if you don't go looking for love, it will come looking for you.

== Cast ==
- Zayed Khan as Jai Malhotra
- Dia Mirza as Naina Kapoor
- Shabana Azmi as Nandini Kapoor, Naina's mother (special appearance)
- Ritesh Deshmukh as Kunal Ahuja (special appearance)
- Boman Irani as Shyamlal Thapar, Sheila's father (special appearance)
- Tisca Chopra as Sheila Thapar
- Farida Jalal as Beeji
- Soni Razdan as Gayatri's mother
- Cyrus Sahukar as Govind
- Satyadeep Mishra as Arjun
- Vaibhav Talwar as Dhruv
- Auritra Ghosh as Gayatri
- Pallavi Sharda as Radhika
- Umang Jain as Ritu
- Shah Rukh Khan as Himself (cameo appearance)

== Soundtrack ==
Love Breakups Zindagi

Soundtrack album by Salim–Sulaiman
- Released: 3 September 2011
- Genre: Film soundtrack
- Label: T-Series
- Producer: Salim–Sulaiman

Salim–Sulaiman chronology
Anaganaga O Dheerudu (2011)	Love Breakups Zindagi (2011)	Aazaan (2011)

Professional ratings
Review scores
Source	Rating
Bollywood Hungama	3.5/5 stars
Bollyspice	3/5 stars

The music of Love Breakups Zindagi was launched on 3 September 2011. The music is composed by the duo Salim–Sulaiman and the lyrics are penned by Javed Akhtar. The album received mostly positive reviews from critics. Sheetal Tiwari of Bollyspice awarded 3 stars saying, "All in Love, Love Breakups Zindagi, practices what it preaches in that it has songs of love, life and all that lies in between. 'Rab Rakha' and 'Chhayee Hai Tanhayee' are obviously come out on top while 'Love Love Love' and 'Rozaana' are close runners-up. In any event, there is something to be loved about each track from the soundtrack and the merchant brothers continue to remind us why they are considered as one of the best music duos of the current era." Joginder Tuteja of Bollywood Hungama gave the album 3.5 stars and stated, "This is turning out to be one real good season when it comes to romantic feel good music being churned out in Bollywood. Go for Love Breakups Zindagi, it will pleasantly surprise you."

The album also included a remix of the song "Main Se Meena Se" from the 1987 film Khudgarz, sung by Sonu Nigam and Shreya Ghoshal.

No.	Title	Singer(s)	Length
1.	"Rozaana"	Salim Merchant	03:58
2.	"Love Love Love"	Benny Dayal, Shraddha Pandit	04:51
3.	"Chhayee Hai Tanhayee"	Shafqat Amanat Ali, Salim Merchant, Shruti Pathak	03:25
4.	"Rab Rakha"	Sonu Nigam, Shreya Ghoshal, Salim Merchant, Meroan Droseter, Shraddha Pandit	04:50
5.	"Main Se Meena Se"	Sonu Nigam, Shreya Ghoshal	05:09
6.	"Rozaana (Remix by Dj A-Myth)"	Salim Merchant	04:14

== Reception ==
=== Critical response ===
Love Breakups Zindagi received mixed reviews upon release. Preeti Arora from Rediff.com gave it 2 out of 5 stars, calling it predictable. Gaurav Malani of The Times of India lamented the fact that director Sahil Singha doesn't show any innovation in the storytelling of his debut venture. Writing for CNN-IBN, Rajeev Masand gave the film 2 out of 5 stars writing "Love Breakups Zindagi' is an inoffensive film that has pleasant music and neat production design. First-timer Sahil Sangha directs with an easy hand, giving the film a light-hearted feel. Alas, he's working from a script that offers nothing new or exciting to chew on. I'm going with two out of five for 'Love Breakups Zindagi'. It's a tiring retread of a once popular formula that's wearing thin now."

DNA's Akansha Naval-Shetye and Soumyadipta Banerjee gave the film positive review saying "The director has taken a good decision by not putting an airport chase sequence in the film and the leading pair saying ‘I love you’ as they miss their flight. It is not there, hence you can go and watch the film for sure."
