= Masooma Ranalvi =

Indian activist against female genital mutilation

Masooma Ranalvi is an activist for the ending of female genital mutilation (FGM) in India.

She is the founder of We Speak Out, an organization dedicated to helping Dawoodi Bohra women escape or heal from female genital mutilation. Ranalvi is a part of the Dawoodi Bohra Shi'a Muslim community in western India. She shares her personal experience with FGM to open discourse on violence against women, sexual harassment, and sexism within traditional norms. Her agenda is to create and expand a platform for other women to openly discuss, and politically fight against, female genital mutilation.

== Her Story ==
In 2015, Ranalvi shared her story on WhatsApp, soon after starting the We Speak Out movement. Ranalvi was cut at the age of seven in her village in India. One day, Ranalvi's grandmother took her to an old building where a woman performed female genital mutilation on her. In this community, FGM is a traditional custom based in the egalitarianism within the Muslim religion.

== Activism ==
Ranalvi is the founder of We Speak Out. Working with the group, Sahiyo, Ranalvi created an online petition to stop female genital mutilation in the Bohra community that received over one hundred thousand signatures. Ranalvi's work also focuses on the mental health of FGM survivors. The organization's mission is to outwardly address India's government for a policy ban on FGM in the Bohra community, and extend this nationwide.
