= IVM Podcasts =

Indian multi-lingual podcast network

Presentation
- Hosted by: Multiple

Publication
- Original release: 8 March 2015

Related
- Website: ivmpodcasts.com

IVM (Indus Vox Media) Podcasts is an Indian multi-lingual podcast network founded in 2015 that hosts a wide variety of podcasts, including Cyrus Says, featuring Cyrus Broacha. IVM also featured celebrity Abhishek Bachchan on a football podcast. Also, Shashi Kapoor's son Kunal Kapoor and his son Zahan Kapoor had been a part of a podcast on the theatre.

== History ==
It was founded on 8 March 2015, by Amit Doshi and co-founded by Kavita Rajwade.
