= Podcasting in India =

Podcasting in India began around 2005 when Apple updated iTunes to support podcasts, The podcast industry in India has reported a significant growth in listenership over the years. As per PricewaterhouseCoopers' Media and Entertainment Outlook 2020 report, with over 57.6 million listeners, India has emerged as the third-largest podcast listening market after China and the US. According to The Free Press Journal, "India will have 95 million Podcast monthly active users", which is thirty-four percent more than the previous year.

There has been a growth of podcast channels and podcast production companies like Spooler, Aawaz.com, Saavn, and Audiomatic.

== See also ==
- Screencast
- Webcast
- List of podcasting companies
- List of Indian podcasts
