= Arre (brand) =

Mumbai-based Indian entertainment content platform

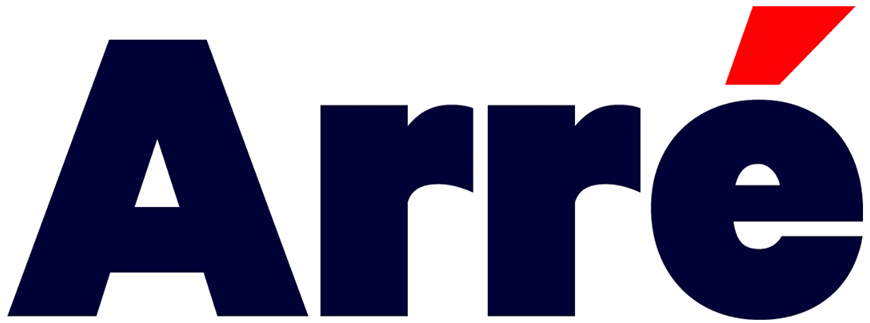
- Arre logo
- Type: Private
- Industry: Entertainment, Infotainment, digital content
- Genre: Comedy, drama, thriller, documentary, entertainment, infotainment, opinion
- Founded: February 2015; 11 years ago in Mumbai, Maharashtra, India
- Founder: B. Sai Kumar; Ajay Chacko; Sanjay Ray Chaudhuri (Ray C)
- Headquarters: Mumbai
- Products: OTT platform
- Services: Sketch comedy, web-series, music videos, audio series, documentaries, text
- Number of employees: 35
- Parent: UDigital Content
- Website: arre.co.in

Arre (/ɑːreɪ/) (stylized as Arré) is an Indian OTT platform based in Mumbai. It produces and publishes videos, audio series, web series, documentaries, text and doodles through its online channel. Founded by former Network 18 and TV 18 executives B. Sai Kumar, Ajay Chacko, and Sanjay Ray Chaudhari, it is a content-based startup and was launched in April 2016.

== History ==
Former Network TV18 CEO B. Sai Kumar, COO Ajay Chacko, and director Sanjay Ray Chaudhuri (Ray C) formed Arre in October 2015. "Arre" is an Indian colloquialism that roughly translates to "whoa" in English.

In April 2016, Enam group invested an undisclosed amount in Arre, as did the founders.

== Development ==
The technology, architecture, design and developed by Monocept. The online platform is designed by French agency Area 17.

== Products ==
Early in 2015, Arre announced Ho Ja Re-Gender, based on the Israeli experimental format of Re-Gender originally produced by Armoza Formats. In the series, six participants are given a chance to experience life as a member of the opposite sex.

In August 2015, the company tied up with newspaper The Indian Express to produce investigative documentaries for a world audience. A documentary titled Death by Breath was released on 2 May 2016 which discussed the high levels of air pollution in the Indian state of New Delhi.

in January 2016, the company launched its first web sitcom, titled I Don't Watch TV. Produced by Timbuktu Films, it is a satire on the Indian TV industry and stars television personalities like Nakuul Mehta and Bollywood film critic Rajeev Masand.

In April 2016, it launched A.I.SHA – My Virtual Girlfriend, a webcam fiction show produced by reality show producer and actor Raghu Ram. Season 2 of the show premiered in March 2017.

In May 2016, it launched a podcast titled Trial By Error: The Aarushi Files based on the 2008 Noida double murder case, in partnership with online music streaming service Saavn.

In September 2016, Arre launched Official Chukyagiri, which tells the story of Spandan Chukya, an MNC intern and the corporate world, seen through his eyes. It was produced by Amritpal Singh Bindra, Anand Tiwari and their company Still & Still Moving Pictures.

In February 2017, Arre tied up with Facebook to premiere its comic series The Adventures of Abbaas Mastan, a fictionalised world of two film students on one global mission – to make the world's most viral video.

In June 2017, Arre launched a new adventure travel show,The Real High, featuring Rannvijay Singha, along with a group of six young kids of urban upbringing, that explores various parts of the north-eastern state, Arunachal Pradesh.

In April 2018, Arré launched the web series Official CEOgiri which was a continuity of Official Chukyagiri. Actor Sumeet Vyas played the lead character.

=== Web series ===
- Ho Ja Re-gender (2016)
- I Don't Watch TV (2016)
- A.I.SHA My Virtual Girlfriend (2016)
- Official Chukyagiri (2016)
- The Adventures of Abbaas Mastan (2017)
- A.I.SHA My Virtual Girlfriend Season 2 (2017)
- The Real High (2017)
- Official CEOgiri (2018)
- PariWar (2020)
- 1962: The war in the hills (2021)
- Main Monica (2022)
- Murder in Agonda (2022)
- Sorry Bhaisahab (2022)
- Arthmaindya Arun Kumar (2023)
- Dillogical (2024)
- Arthmaindya Arun Kumar 2 (2024)

=== Audio series ===
- Trial By Error: The Aarushi Files (2016)
- Aarushi Files (Hindi) (2016)

=== Documentaries ===
- Death by Breath (2016)
- Kashmir’s Lost Children (2016)

== Partnerships ==
In April 2016, Arre partnered with music streaming service Saavn to produce and distribute a podcast titled Trial By Error: The Aarushi Files based on the 2008 Noida double murder case.

In July 2016, Arre joined with internet-based TV streaming and OTT service provider, YuppTV, to distribute content on its YuppTV Bazaar platform. Speaking about the partnership, Arre co-founder and managing director, B Saikumar, said, "Arre is excited to reach out to an Indian and worldwide audience through YuppTV Bazaar's OTT platform. We look forward to a long-term association with YuppTV and hope to partner on many more content offerings on YuppTV Bazaar."

In September 2016, Arre tied up with Mumbai-based Goquest Media to distribute and monetise Arre's content digitally across the world.

In September 2016 Arre also announced a distribution partnership with SonyLiv. The partnership will enable SonyLiv users to watch Arre's latest web series on its web and mobile platforms. Arre's entire video content library will be available as a part of SonyLiv's extensive catalogue in due course. In November 2016 this was followed by an announcement that the companies would co-produce a digital series starring actor Rithvik Dhanjani, who would also co-produce the show. Release was planned for early 2017.

As of October 2016, Arre had tied up with France's largest television network, TF1 Xtra and Vodafone Play.

In February 2017, Arre partnered with Ola Play, whereby digital content from Arré would be available to stream through Ola's connected car platform.

In August 2021 Arre was Collabed with Kia in India for 3 episodes with Kia Seltos.

== See also ==
- TVF Play
- Taboola
