= Mrudanga =

Instrument

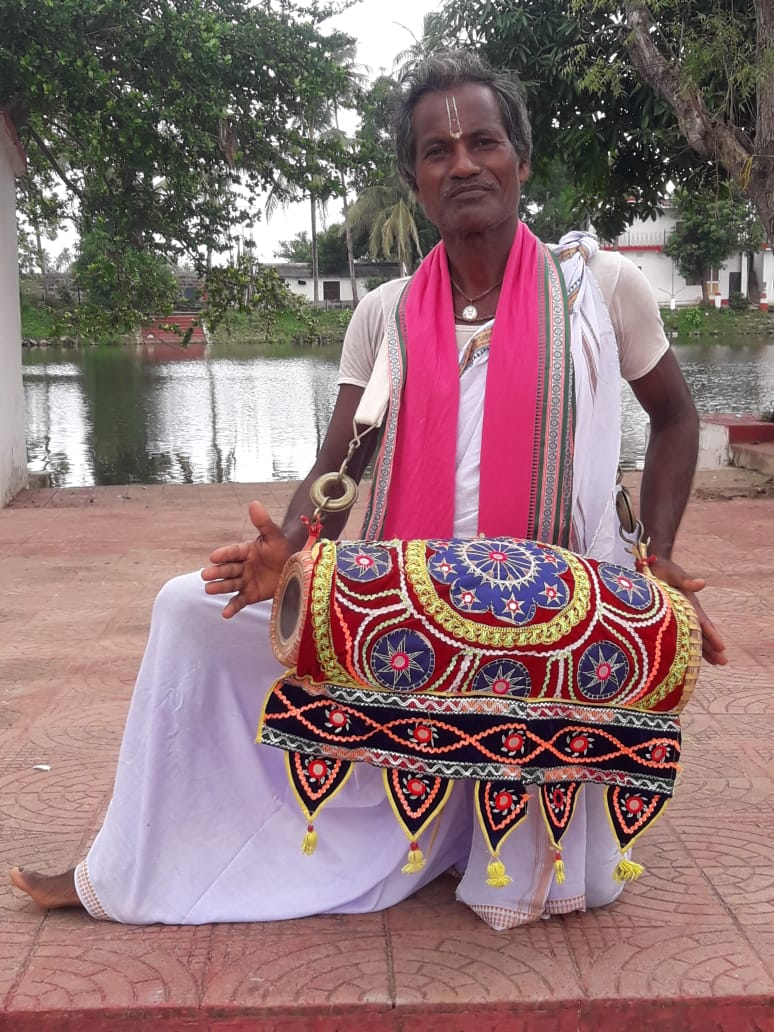
- Guru Kishore Pradhan playing the Mrudanga

Percussion instrument
- Other names: Khola
- Hornbostel–Sachs classification: 211.222.1 (Membranophone directly struck by hand)

More articles or information
- Odissi music

Mrudanga (Odia: ମୃଦଙ୍ଗ, romanized: Mrudanga, Odia: [mrud̪ɔŋɡɔ]), also known as Khola (Odia: ଖୋଳ, romanized: Khoḷa) is a classical percussive instrument native to the east Indian state of Odisha with a developed distinct traditional repertoire and technique. It has been used alongside the Mardala in Odissi classical music from ancient times, which is a comparatively bass-heavy drum as opposed to the high-pitched Mrudanga.

The Mrudanga is used in a wide range of traditional art forms of Odisha, including Pala, Sankirtana (Odisi Kirtana), Odissi dance, Bhagabata Tungi, Radha Prema Lila, Ramalila, Krusnalila and more. The instrument is different from other instruments that have similar names (as opposed to the Mridangam, used in South Indian music) in the Indian subcontinent due to its unique construction, acoustic features and traditional playing technique.

== History ==
Odishan musicologists in ancient treatises have mentioned four distinct kinds of instruments or vadyas : tat or stringed instruments, susira or wind instruments, anaddha or leather instruments / drums & finally ghana or metallic instruments.

Out of these four, the Mrudanga falls under the category of anaddha vadyas or drums and is considered one of the earliest percussion instruments, said to be invented by Mahadeva himself.

== Construction ==
The Mrudanga is made by potters from special mud collected from the banks of rivers in Odisha.

== Repertoire and technique ==
The playing of the Mrudanga, like the Mardala, is based on the tala-paddhati or rhythmic system of Odissi music. A tala is a rhythmic structure in Indian music. The talas in use in Odissi music are distinctive, and are not found in other systems of Indian music. The playing of the instrument follows a strict classical grammar.

Traditionally, there are ten vital features of tala that are taken care of :

1. kāla or beats
2. mārga or inter-beat transitions
3. kriyā or hand movements
4. anga
5. graha
6. jāti
7. kalā
8. laya
9. jati
10. prastāra

The kriyas are either nisabda, that is without-sound or sasabda, with sound. The nisabda or soundless kriyas are demonstrated by four types of motions; there is no stroke. The sasabda or sounded kriyas are created by striking a membrane. Apart from these, there are eight desi-kriyas. The regional terminology used in the Mrudanga's context are kalā, ansā, māna, aḍasā, bhaunri, bhaunri aḍasā, tāli, khāli, phānka, bāṇi, ukuṭa, pāṭa, chhanda, bhangi, etc.

Though several hundred talas are defined in treatises, some are more common : ekatāli, khemaṭā or jhulā, rūpaka, tripaṭā, jhampā, āḍatāli, jati, āditala, maṭhā. Other talas that are also used are sarimāna, nihsāri, kuḍuka, aḍḍa, duāḍamāna, upāḍḍa, panchutāla (nabapanchu tala), paḍitāla, pahapaṭa, aṭṭatāla, āṭhatāli and jagannātha tāla. The talas have a characteristic swing that is typical of and universally found in Odissi music. The details of some major talas are listed below.

	Tala	Matra	Bibhaga	Chhanda
1	ekatāli	4	1	4
2	khemaṭā	6	2	3 + 3
3	rūpaka	6	2	2 + 4
4	tripaṭā	7	3	3+ 2 + 2
5	jhampā	10	4	2 + 3 + 2 + 3
6	āḍatāli	14	4	4 + 3 + 4 + 3
7	jati	14	4	3 + 4 + 3 + 4
8	sarimāna	14	4	4 + 2 + 4 + 4
9	nihsāri	10	4	3 + 2 + 3 + 2

=== Padi ===
An exclusive technique called paḍi is frequently employed in traditional Odissi songs. This is composed within the fixed prosody of the respective song. The padi is repeated in several different talas, layas and from different matras. Kabichandra Dr. Kali Charan Patnaik calls this feature 'the lifeline of Odissi music'.

== See also ==
- Odissi music
- Odissi dance
- Mardala
