= Dhaneswar Swain =

Indian musical artist (born 1953)

Badyashree Guru Dhaneswar Swain ଧନେଶ୍ୱର ସ୍ୱାଇଁ
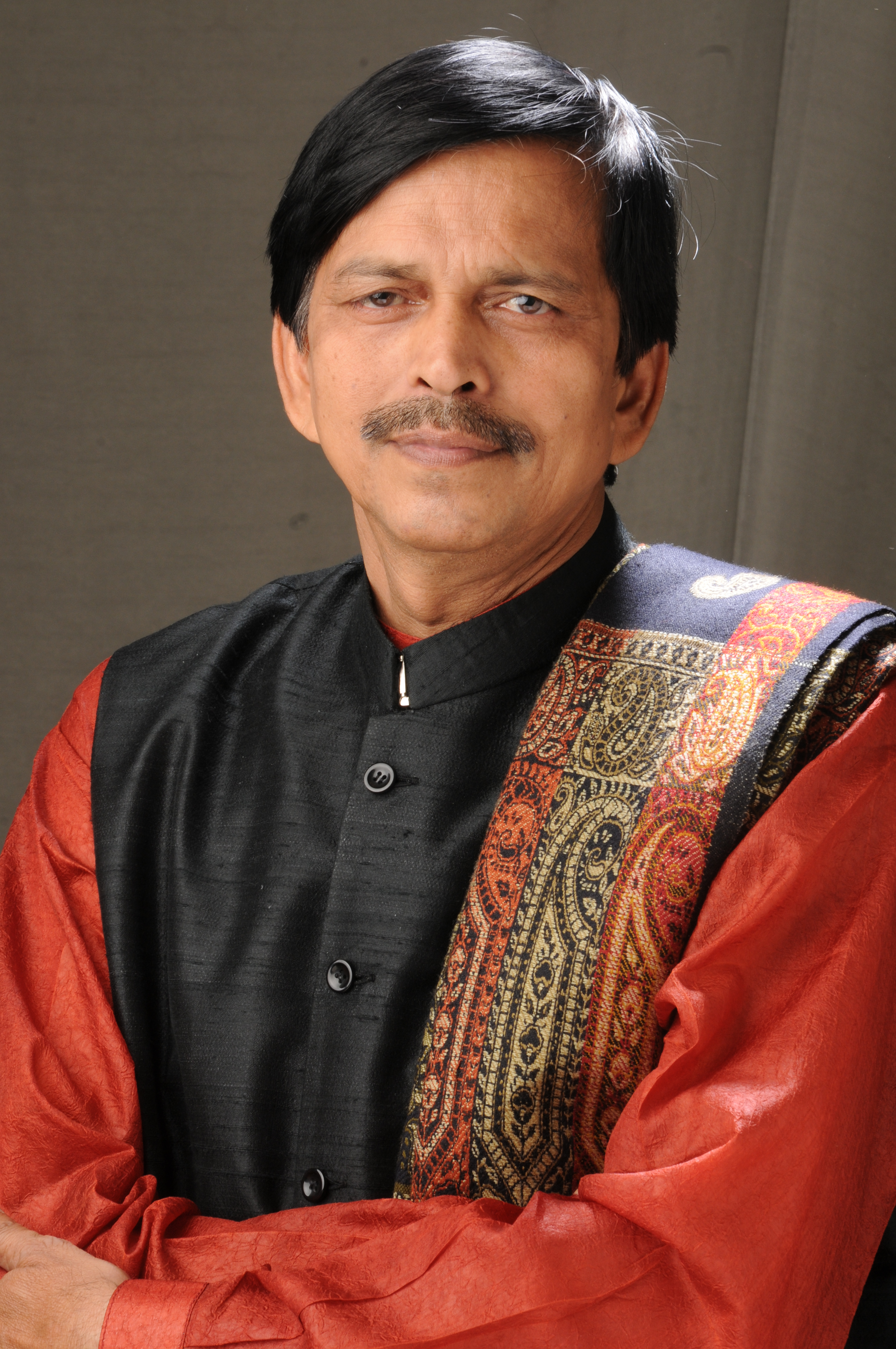

Background information
- Born: Dhaneswar Swain; 18 May 1953; Nahantara, Puri, Odisha
- Genre: Odissi music
- Occupations: Odissi Mardala (Odissi music) Guru and exponent, composer, scholar
- Instrument: Mardala

Dhaneswar Swain (Odia: ଧନେଶ୍ୱର ସ୍ୱାଇଁ, romanized: Dhaneswara Swāin; born on 18 May 1953) is an exponent and Guru of the Odissi Mardala, the traditional percussion instrument of Odissi music. He founded Vadya Vani Gurukula, an institution for training and research in Odissi Mardala and other traditional Odisha percussion instruments.

== Biography ==
He was born in the village of Nahantara in the Puri district of Odisha to Sambhunatha Swain and Kanchana Swain. He received his initial training in the Mardala from his elder brother, Bhramabara Swain. He joined the Utkal Sangeet Mahavidyalaya in 1970 and trained under Gurus Singhari Shyamsundar Kar, Banamali Maharana and Mahadev Rout.

== Career ==
After working with the Odissi danseuse Sonal Mansingh for a year, in 1979, he joined the Mahavidyalaya as a Mardala teacher and worked there for over three decades. Since his retirement, he has been teaching students at the Ramhari Das Odissi Gurukula, Biragobindapur, Puri district. Through SPIC MACAY, Guru Swain has brought Odissi Mardala to many educational institutions across the country.

He has accompanied Odissi music recitals and Odissi dancers since the 1980s, traveling as the primary percussionist and performing all over India and in the United States, Germany, Spain, Belgium, Denmark, Norway, Finland, China, Singapore, Malaysia, South Korea, Jordan, Israel, and Dubai.

Swain is known for his pioneering efforts to present the Mardala as a solo instrument in its own right. He has given Mardala recitals at various forums across the country, such as the Rajarani music festival, Konarka Natyamandap, Sankat Mochan Festival, Haridas Sangeet Samaroh, All India Radio Sangeet Sammelan, and Sangeet Sandhya at the India Habitat Centre.

He is known for his rhythm compositions for Odissi dance and has created music for a number of choreographic works such as Panchadeva Stuti, Dasamahavidya, Yuge Yuge Jagannatha, Sristi o Pralaya, Sapta Tala, Mana Madhuri, Gita Govinda, Tala Madhurya, Sabda Nrutya, Abartana Bibartana, Badya Madhuri, Jagyansenu, Varsha Abhisara, Krupanidhana, etc. He has composed the rhythm for multiple pallavis such as Kamodi, Kedara Kamodi, Mukhari, Debagandhari, Chandrika Kamodi, Anandabhairabi, Sankarabharana, Madhyamadi, Arabhi, Bakulabharana, Hansakalyani, Hansadhwani, Khambaja, Ragesri, Bajrakanti, etc. Apart from this, a CD of his rhythmic compositions titled Vadya Vani, comprising three traditional instruments of Odisha namely Mardala, Mrudanga and Khanjani, has received appreciation from connoisseurs of tala. He has published research articles and conducted several workshops on the Mardala.

He has been honored for his work with the title Badyashree conferred by the Utkal Sahitya Kala Parishad in 1999.

For his contributions to Odissi music and Odissi Mardala, he received the Odisha Sangeet Natak Akademi award in 2008 and the Sangeet Natak Akademi award in 2013.

== Articles ==
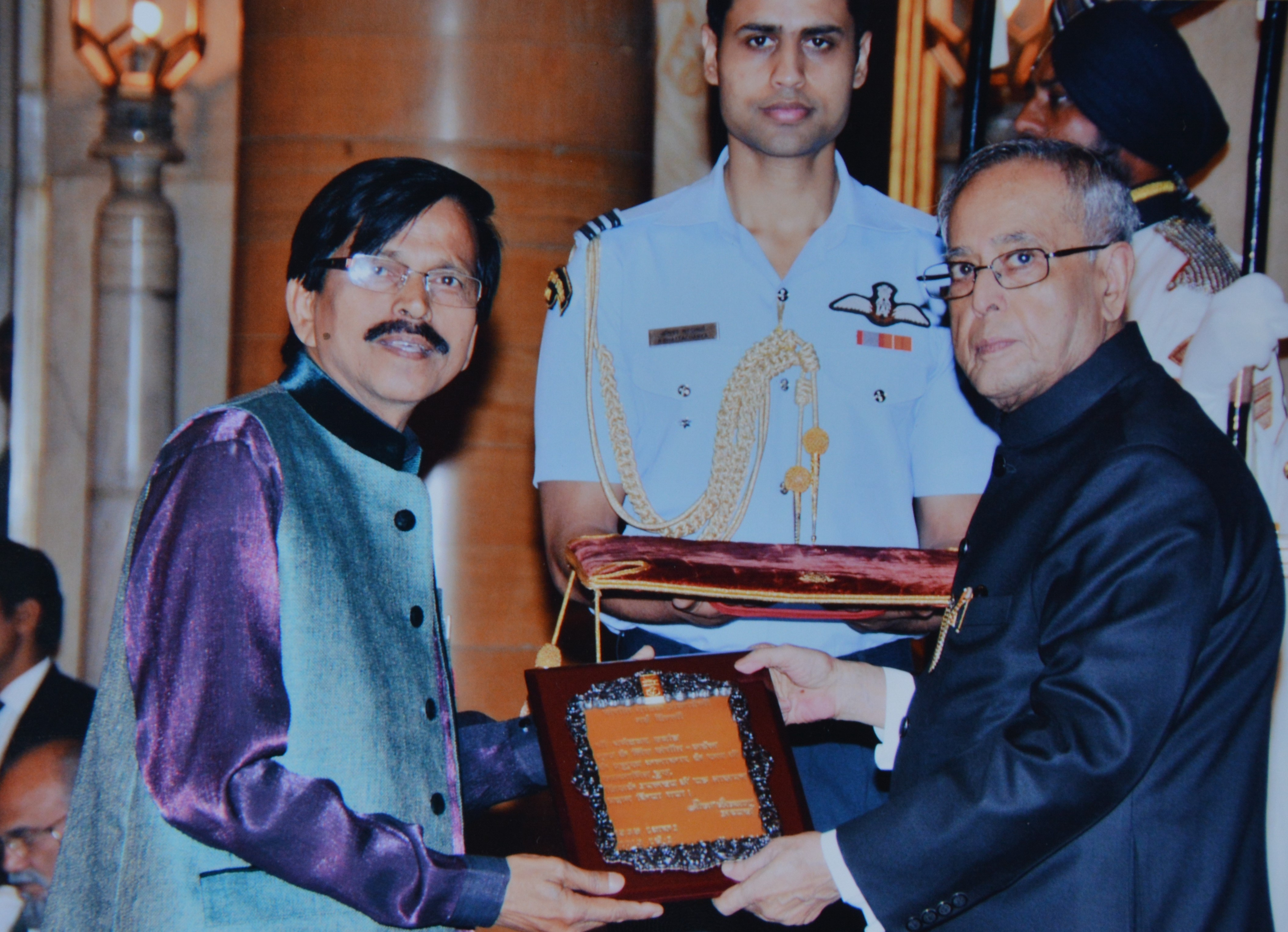
Guru Dhaneswar Swain receiving the Sangeet Natak Akademi award (2013) from President Pranab Mukherjee

Listed below are some research articles authored by Guru Dhaneswar Swain. He is presently authoring a book on Mardala, soon to be published.

- Odissi Mardala
- Ekaka Badana Ra Srunkhala
- Odissi Sangita Ra Tala
- Mardala: Nrutya Sangita Ra Eka Pramukha Anga
- Tala Hin Sangita Ra Prana
- Odisha Ra Sanskrutika Parampara Re Mardala
- Prachina Tala Paddhati
- Odissi Nrutya Ra Tala Sambhara
- Prayogika Alankara
- Development of Mardala in Odisha

== Awards and recognitions ==
- Sangeet Natak Akademi Award (2013)
- Odisha Sangeet Natak Akademi Award (2008)
- Madeli Samman
- Gandharva Kala Samman
- Debaprasad Kalatirtha, Berhampur (1997)
- Utkal Sahitya Kala Parishad, Cuttack (1999)
- Rudrakshya Saptabarnna
- Indian Art Research Center
- Mahadeb Rout Nakhyatra Gurukula
- Sur Singar Sansad, Mumbai
- Mardala Academy, Bhubaneswar (2003)
- Badya Vinod Kshetramohan Kar Samman (2003)
- Sangita Sudhakara Balakrushna Dash Foundation (2006, 2018)
- Akhil Bharatiya Gandharva Mahavidyalaya Mandal (2006)
- Singhari Satabarsiki Samman (2008)
- Shreekhetra Madeli Sri Samman (2008)
- Vedvyas Sangeet Nrutyostav (2009)
- Guru Pankaj Samman, Guru Pankaj Charan Odissi Research Foundation (2011)
- Guru Srinath Raut Award (2012)
- Gangadhara Meher Kala Samman, Gangadhar Meher Pratisthana (2012)
- Guru Gopal Panda Odishi Academy (2013, 2015, 2019)
- Odissi Bikasa Parisada, Nimapada, and Puri (2014)
- Sudra Muni Samman (2015)
- Jogendranath Pati Smruti Sambardhana (2015)
- Guru Birabara Sahoo Prativa Samman (2016)
- Guru Debaprasad Samman (2018)
- Guru Gangadhar Smruti Samman (2018)
- Satyabadi Samman, Satyabadi Sangeet Mahavidyalaya (2018)
- Guru Debaprasad Das Award (2019)
- Nikhila Utkala Sangita Silpi Parisada (2020)
- Mahodadhi Samman
- Kabi Samrat Upendra Bhanja Samman
- Nikhila Utkala Pala Gayaka Parisad
- Sri Nrutya Samman
- Bagdevi Samman
- Guru Sahadev Padhi Samman
- Odisha Dance Academy

== See also ==
- Odissi music
- Mardala
- Gita Govinda
- Gitaprakasa
