= Prahallada Nataka =

Traditional theatre form native to Ganjam, Odisha

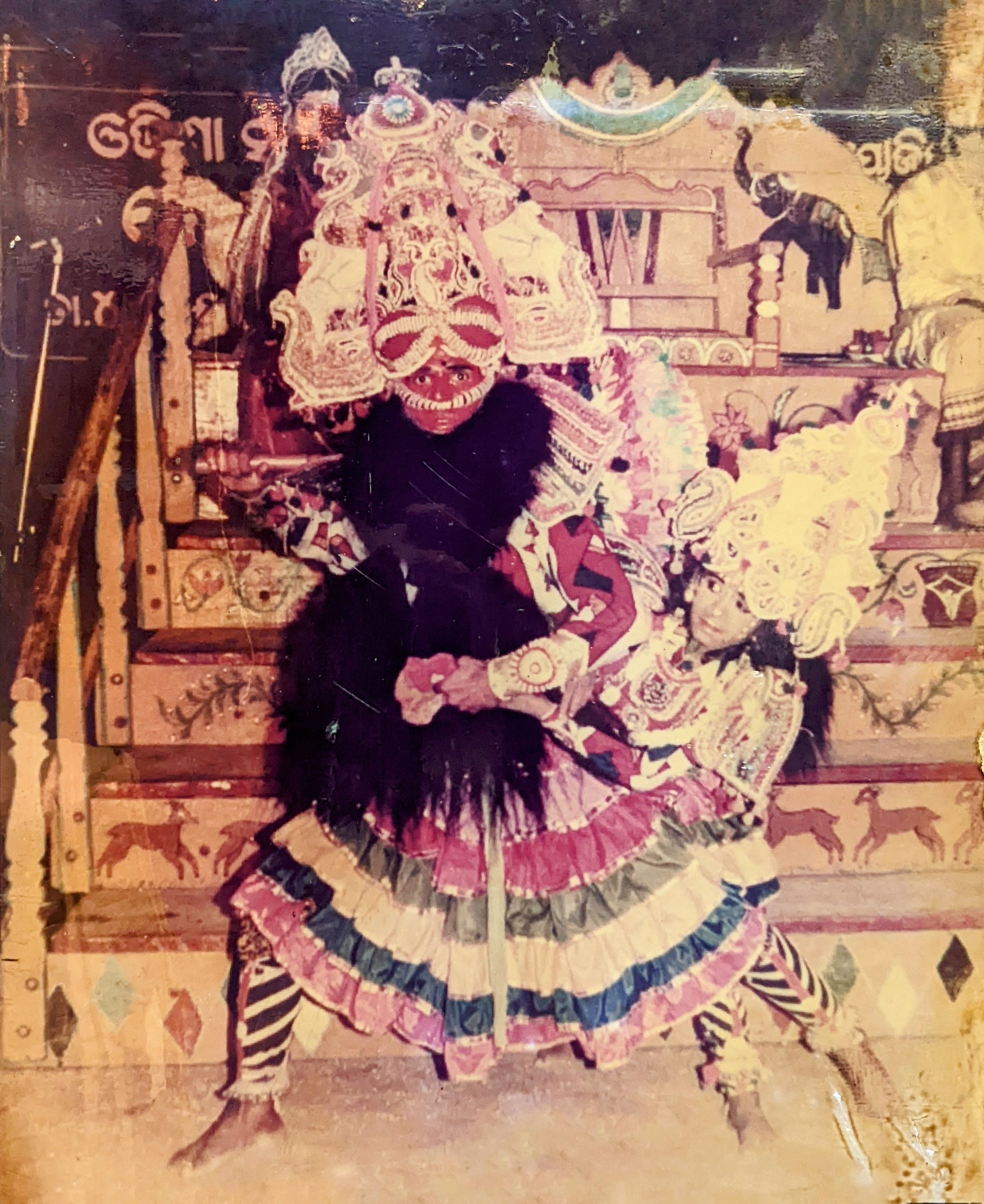
- Raja or Hiranyakasyapa and Prahallada
- Medium: Odissi music dance-drama
- Types: ekaka (singular), badi (two-troupe competition)
- Originating culture: Odia culture
- Originating era: 19th century

Prahallada Nataka (Odia: ପ୍ରହଲ୍ଲାଦ ନାଟକ Prahallāda Nāṭaka, or simply Rajā Nāṭa) is a traditional play native to the Indian state of Odisha. It narrates the story of Vishnu's man-lion avatar, Nrusingha or Narasimha, through over 200 songs based on almost 35 ragas of Odissi music. The play is based on a text by Raja Ramakrusna Chhotaraya, King of Jalantara, a small kingdom in former southern Odisha, now in the Srikakulam district of Andhra Pradesh.

== History ==
The district of Ganjam had eighteen feudal chiefs, or zamindars, who called themselves Rajas. They were patrons of art, literature and culture. The Prahallada Nataka was born in one such kingdom, or zamindari.

The primary text of the Prahallada Nataka was written in the mid-19th century by Raja Ramakrusna Chhotaraya. Dr. Bhagaban Panda dates it to 1829-1927, Suresh Balabantaray places its creation from 1857-1905, and Dr. John Emigh dates it to 1870-80. Ramakrusna was the Raja of the small princely state of Jalantara in the southern part of Odisha that borders present-day Andhra Pradesh (the region until North Srikakulam district was part of ancient Kalinga and a large majority of the demography used to be Odia prior to 20th century state formation). Although attributed to the Raja, researchers agree that the majority of the text was written by the Odissi musician-poet Gourahari Parichha of Paralakhemundi. According to Dr. Purna Mahapatra, the play was first written in Tarala by Ramachandra Suradeo, the king of Tarala and later spread to Jalantara, whose version became the most famous.

While multiple other plays on the same theme exist, Ramakrusna's is generally considered the best example of the routine and was imitated by other Rajas, including Kishore Chandra Harichandan Jagaddeb Ray of Surangi, Padmanabha Narayana Deba of Paralakhemundi, and Ramachandra Suradeo of Tarala.

The original manuscript was preserved in the Madras Oriental Manuscript Library and collected by the Directorate of Culture of the Government of Orissa on March 8, 1938, and securely kept in the erstwhile Ravenshaw Library (now Kanika Library). The Odisha State Museum kept a paper manuscript of the text, copied some time in the 1920s.

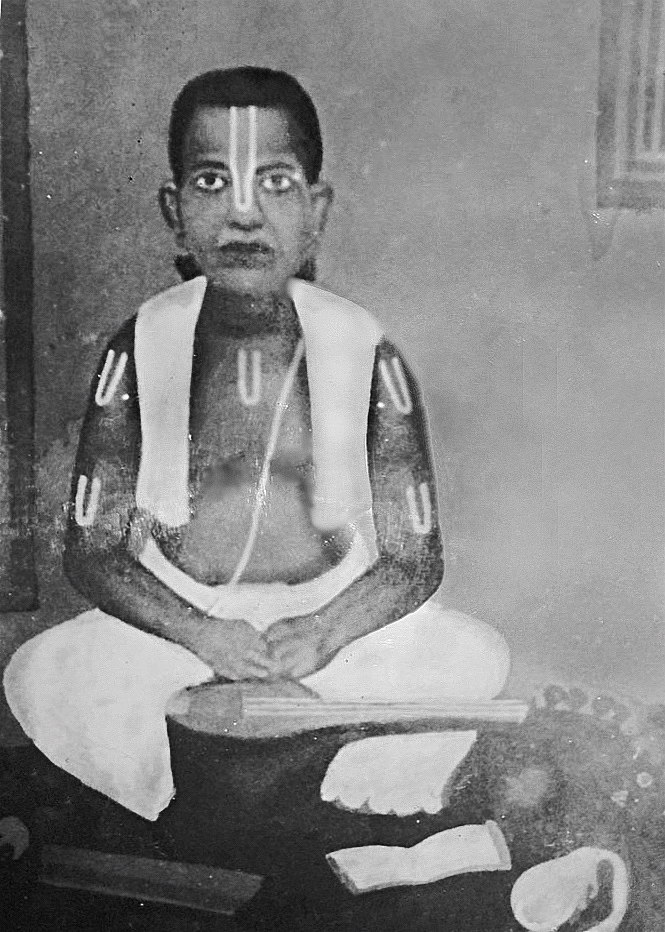
Odissi musician and poet Gourahari Parichha, believed to be originator of the form

In the last century, as many as 172 troupes performed the play in the Ganjam district. As of the late 1990s, the play was performed by approximately 57 village theatre companies, due to dwindling audiences. Only about fifty troupes exist today, as the number of professional Rajas declined from 150 to 20.

== Performance ==
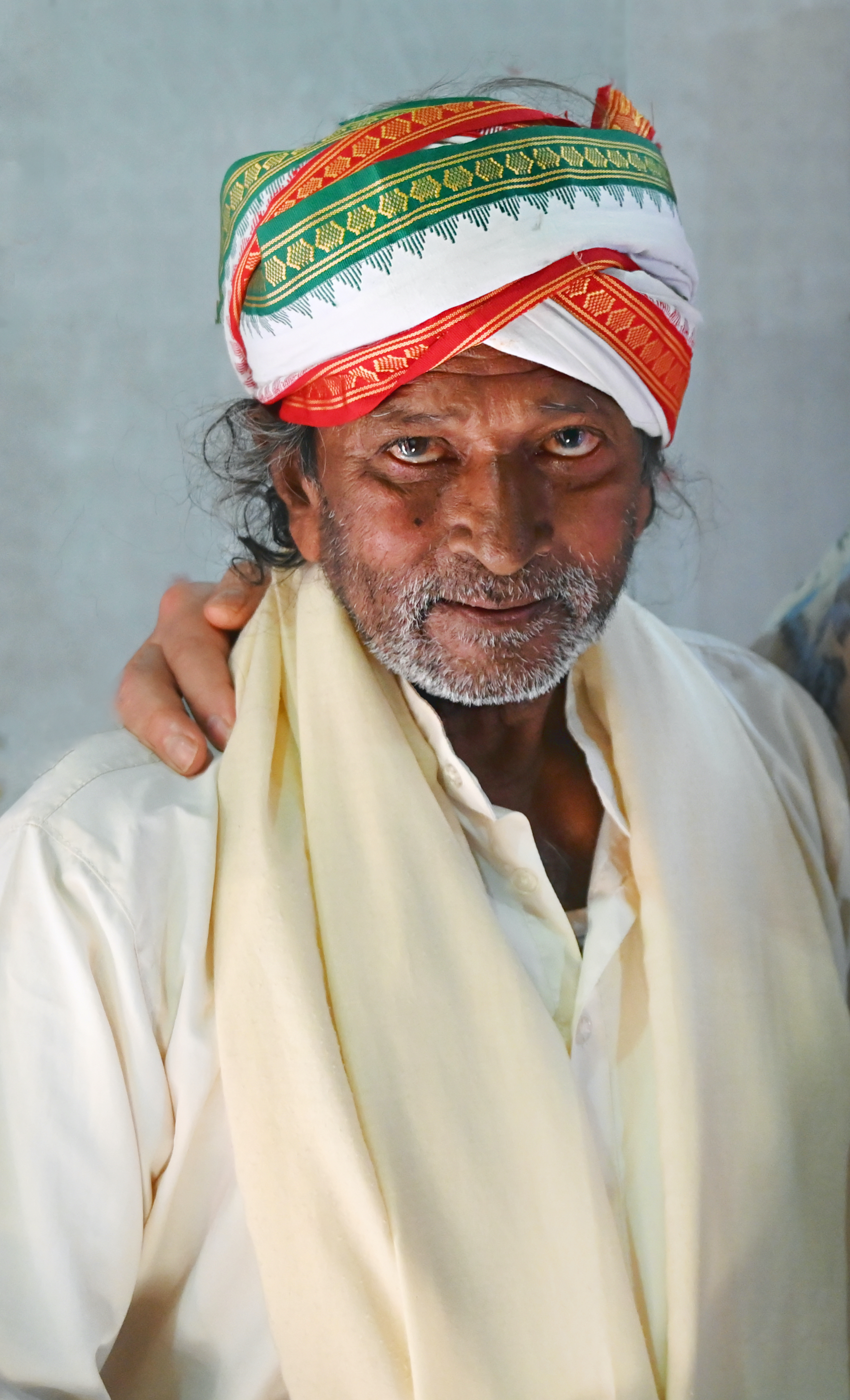
Guru Simanchal Patro, renowned for his musical prowess and lively abhinaya of Hiranyakasyapa. He received the Sangeet Natak Akademi Award in the year 1990 for his contribution to the art form.

Each performance lasts 12 hours. The complete play, as enacted in royal courts of Odisha's southern gadajatas, often took as long as 7 nights.

Prahallada Nataka has multiple characters, but only a few remain relevant throughout the play. These include Hiranyakasyapa 'Raja'; his wife, Lilabati; their son, Prahallada; and the sutradhara. Occasionally, Hiranyakasyapa's ministers Biprachitti and Trimastaka, along with the sentry, or duari, occupy the stage throughout the play. In the past days, Female characters were portrayed by male actors. But now, females are participating as well.

Prahallada Nataka is performed in an open-air setting. It uses a unique seven-stepped platform called the mancha. This is wooden platform, around six feet high. The top of the platform has an area of about 6 x 4 feet, on which is placed the throne of Hiranyakasyapa. The mancha is usually collapsible and easily dismantled. It is erected before the performance begins. The space in front of the mancha is used as the stage. This space is identified as Hiranyakasyapa's Royal Court (containing seven steps that represent his overlordship of the seven worlds). A chair fitted on top of the platform acts as his throne. A temporary pillar is constructed opposite to the Mancha for the last scene, where Nrusingha emerges.

The mask used for Nrusingha is usually one or two centuries old. It receives regular worship in a village shrine throughout the year and is worn only during a performance. As a mark of respect, the performers maintain ritual purity, which usually means abstaining from non-vegetarian food and liquor.

=== Music ===
Music is the life of Prahallada Nataka. Since music is dominant, the lead singer, also known as the Gahaka must be an excellent vocalist. He also has to memorise the entire repertoire of songs. The Gahaka, apart from being the singer also acts as the interpreter, commentator and director of the performance. He does not have any elaborate makeup or costume but has specific songs and dialogues. He sings eulogies of deities, introduces the audience to situations and speaks the asides of a character. As an interpreter, he has the task of explaining to lay spectators the cryptic dialogues of the play. This is the reason why the Gahaka is also known as the Sutradhara in the tradition, allied to the use of the term 'Sutradhara' in Sanskrit plays.

Prahallada Nataka has a repertoire of over three hundred songs. All the songs are classical, based on Odissi music and employ traditional ragas & talas unique to the Odissi tradition. Dhyana-shlokas of the respective ragas are sung before beginning any given song. The songs frequently employ padi, a characteristic feature of Odissi music. The percussion instrument used in the music of Prahallada Nataka is a mardala. The ensemble, which typically stands on one side of the mancha, includes Mardala, Mukhabina, Gini, Jhanja, and a Harmonium.

== Recognition ==
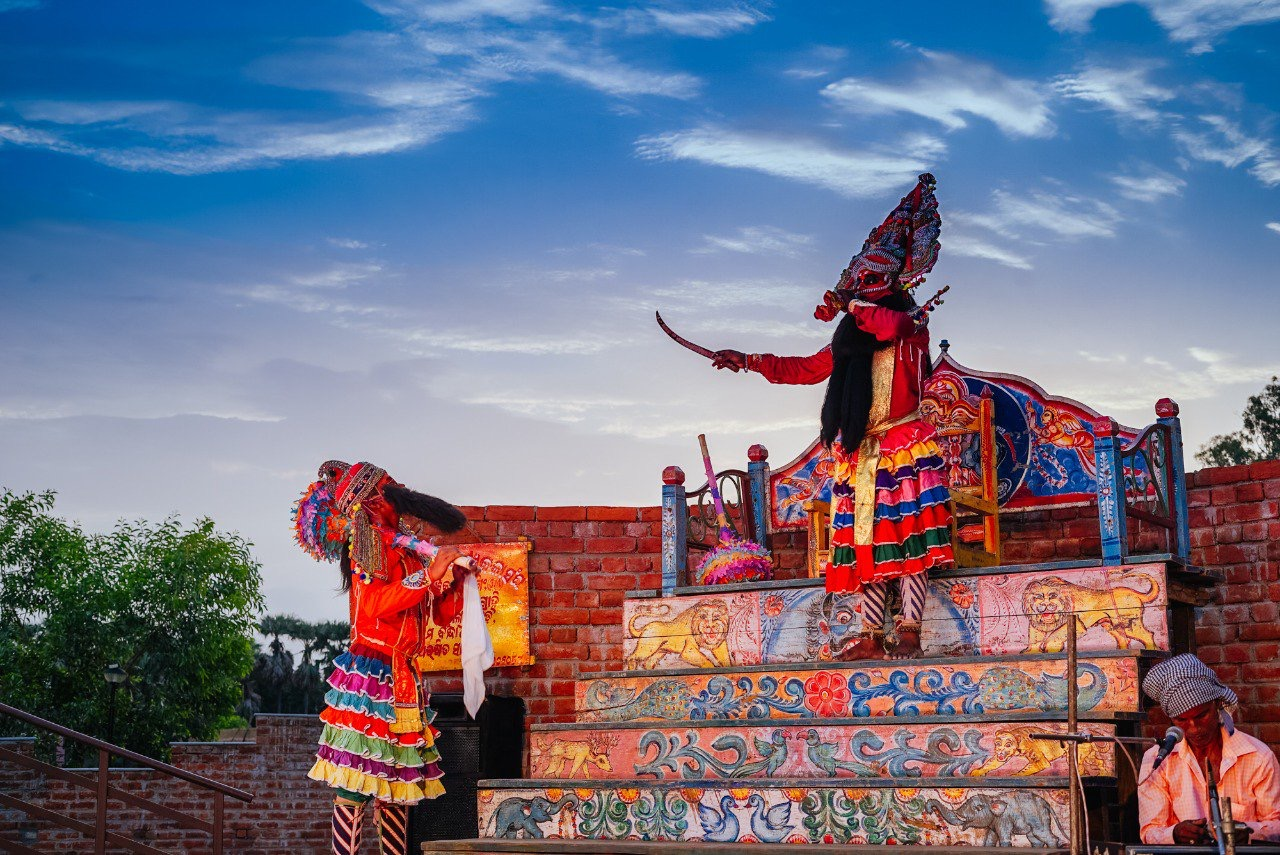
Hiranyakasyapa (standing on the mancha) orders his duari

Several performers have received awards from the Sangeet Natak Akademi, India. These include Raghunath Satpathy (1980), Simanchal Patro (1990), Krishna Chandra Sahu (2000) as Akademi Awardees and Brundaban Jena (2006), Pramod Kumar Nahak (2008) as Yuva Puraskar Awardees. Some eminent Gurus of the early 20th century are Guru Ghanasyama Badatya, Guru Iswara Pradhan, Guru Bankini Satpathy, Guru Arjuna Panigrahi (Adhikari), Guru Raghunath Satpathy,Guru Trinath Pradhan (Kampa), Guru Krishna Chandra Sahu (Kansari), Guru Simanchal Patro, Guru Laxman Satpathy and Guru Maheswar Rana. Among notable Gurus of the form in the present era are Guru Gokulananda Pradhan ((son of Great Guru Trinath Pradhan (Kampa)) and Guru Brundabana Jena.
