= Bharata Lila =

Indian performing theatre form

Bharata lila
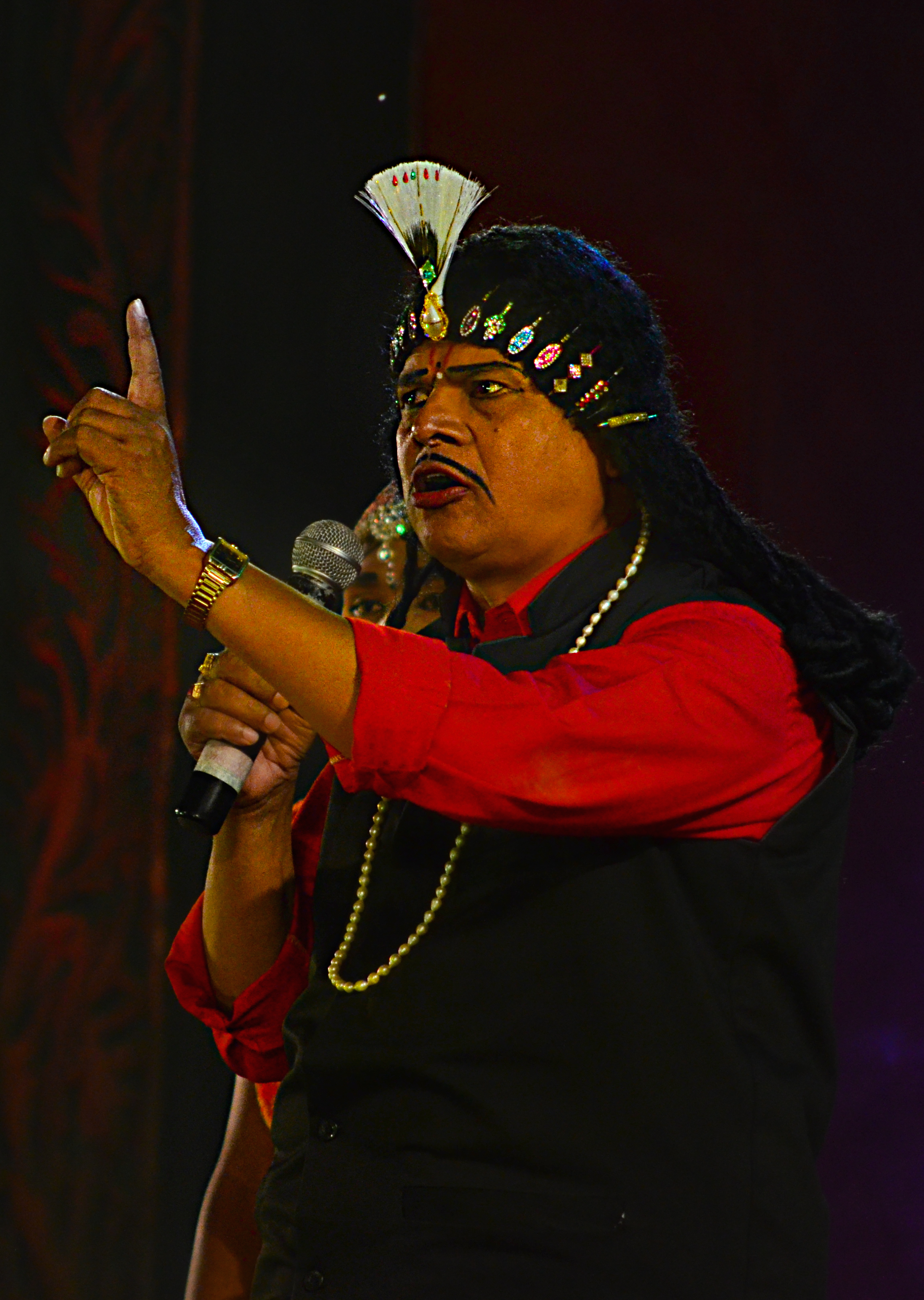
- Guru Santosh Kumar Padhi plays the duari
- Medium: Musical theatre
- Originating culture: Odia culture
- Originating era: Nineteenth century (present form)

Bharata Lila is an Indian performing theater form of Ganjam district of Odisha. The plot is based on characters of the Mahabharata, thus the name of the form. Because of the importance of a central character Duari, Arjuna's sentry, it is also called Duari Nata or Duari Llla. The focal point of the plot is the story of Arjuna & Subhadra's romance, which is why it is also known as Subhadra Harana. Apart from Ganjam, it is also performed in some parts in western Odisha. The play is known for its effective use of humour within the traditional storyline. A regular performance of Bharata Lila in the 21st century goes on for about 10–12 hours. In the last century performances used to last for a couple of days at a stretch. The badi is a performance method in Odisha's traditional artforms where opponents compete with each other. In urban settings, Bharata Lila performances are regularly condensed to just 2–3 hours owing to lack of time.

The plot is based on Odia poetry written by the poet Dinabandhu Dasa, mostly in the chhanda form of Odissi music. While Dinabandhu's version of the play was written only in the 19th century, older forms of the play used to be in vogue even before him. The subject matter has been dealt with extensively in Sarala Dasa's 15th-century Odia Mahabharata as well as Upendra Bhanja's ornate epic-poem Subhadra Parinaya. Dinabandhu's narrative greatly derives from these retellings of the Mahabharata episode. Medieval Odia literature, including the Odissi songs of poets Dinakrusna Dasa, Kabi Samrat Upendra Bhanja, Kabisurjya Baladeba Ratha, Gopalakrusna Pattanayaka are also employed in relevant situations. Classical Odissi music is freely interspersed with folk music. The characters of Bharata Lila are Arjuna, Subhadra, Satyabhama from Mahabharata, and a central character "duari" which is absent in the epic. The ensemble of Bharata Lila comprises a mardala, gini, jodinagara, ghuduki and harmonium.
