= Banamali Maharana =

Percussionist from Odisha, India

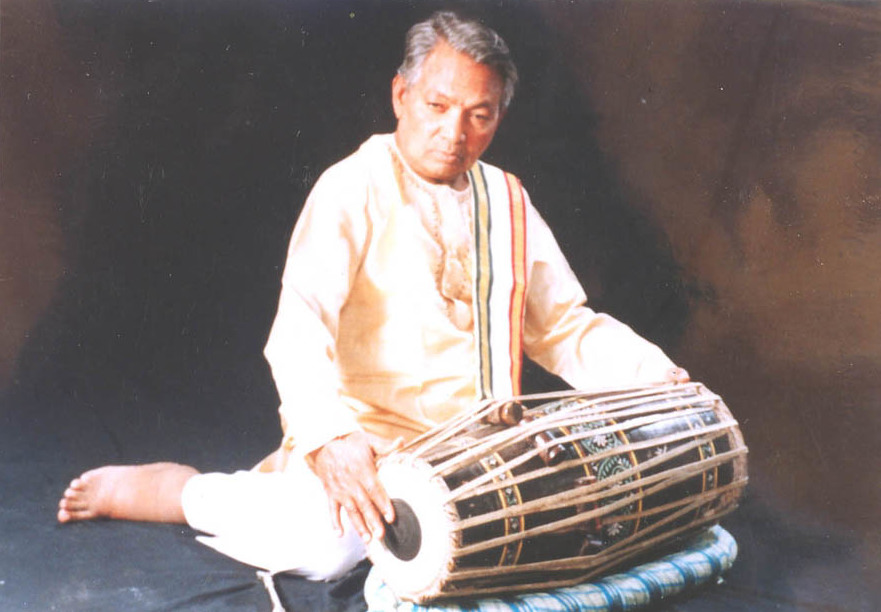
- Born: 16 May 1941; Raghurajpur, Puri, Odisha, India
- Died: 17 November 2018 (aged 77); Bhubaneswar, Odisha, India
- Occupation: Percussionist - Odissi Mardala Guru
- Notable work: Basanta Rasa
- Style: Odissi music
- Awards: Sangeet Natak Akademi Award

Banamali Maharana (Odia: ବନମାଳୀ ମହାରଣା, romanized: Banamāḷi Mahāraṇā, 16 May 1941 – 17 November 2018) was an Indian classical musician, revered Guru, and master percussionist specializing in the Mardala, a traditional percussion instrument of Odissi music. He is widely recognized for systematizing the Odissi style of Mardala playing and bringing Mardala on par with Tabla of northern India and Ghatam and Mridangam of South India.

== Early life and background ==
Maharana was born on 16 May 1941 in Raghurajpur, a heritage village in Puri district, Odisha, known for its extraordinary 'Patta Chitra' paintings. He was born to Suman Maharana and Radhamani Maharana. Even as a child, he was recognised for his talent in percussion instruments.

== Career ==
Maharana began playing Khola (Mrudanga) and Dholak with inspiration from the Rasalila of Shri Mohan Sunder Dev Goswamy.

His formal training began upon joining the Annapurna Theatre, where he learned percussion from Singhari Shyamsundar Kar and Kshetramohan Kar. His brother, Guru Kelucharan Mohapatra, accompanied him on most of his dance performances.

Maharana taught Mardala first at Kala Vikas Kendra in Cuttack, then at Utkal Sangeet Mahavidyalaya. He introduced a seven-year course in Mardala music to Utkal Sangeet Mahavidyalaya before retiring as head of the Mardala department in 1999.

Besides Kelucharana Mohapatra, Maharana has accompanied Sanjukta Panigrahi, Oopali Operajita, Priyambada Mohanty Hejmadi, Sonal Mansingh, Aruna Mohanty, Sujata Mohapatra, Parwati Dutta and others in dance performances, both in India and abroad. He received the Orissa Sangeet Natak Akademi Award for his contribution to Odissi music as a Mardala artist in 1994.

== Artistic Contributions ==
Maharana has accompanied many Odissi dancers and musicians, including Dr. Priyambada Mohanty, the late Padma Shri Sanjukta Panigrahi, Padma Shri Dr. Minati Mishra, Padma Shri Kiran Sehgal, Padma Vibhushan Sonal Mansingh, Padma Shri Ileana Citaristi, Malavika Sarukkai, Dr. Arghya Masrurwal, Jhelum Paranjape, Devi Basu, Dr. Aloka Kanungo, Padma Shri Aruna Mohanty, Menaka Thakkar (Canada), Nandini Ghosal, Rina Jena, Sutapa Talukdar, Minakshi Behera, Snehalata Samantaray, Chapala Mishra, Nandita Pattnaik, Sagun Butani and Parbati Dutta.

He also worked closely with several renowned music maestros, including the late Sangeet Sudhakar Balakrushna Das, the late Pandit Bhubaneswar Mishra, the late Pandit Kasinath Pujapanda, the late Padma Shri Pandit Raghunath Panigrahi, Dr. Damodar Hota, Pandit Guru Gopal Chandra Panda, Smt. Shyamamani Pattnaik, Shri Jagannath Panigrahi, Shri Ghanasyam Panda, Shri Asit Desai, Shri Manoj Desai, Shri Debasis Sarkar, Sangeet Samrat Bhikari Bal, Shri Rakhal Mohanty, Smt. Indrani Mishra, and Shri Ramahari Das.

== Disciples ==
The following is a list of some of Maharana's students who have played around the globe:

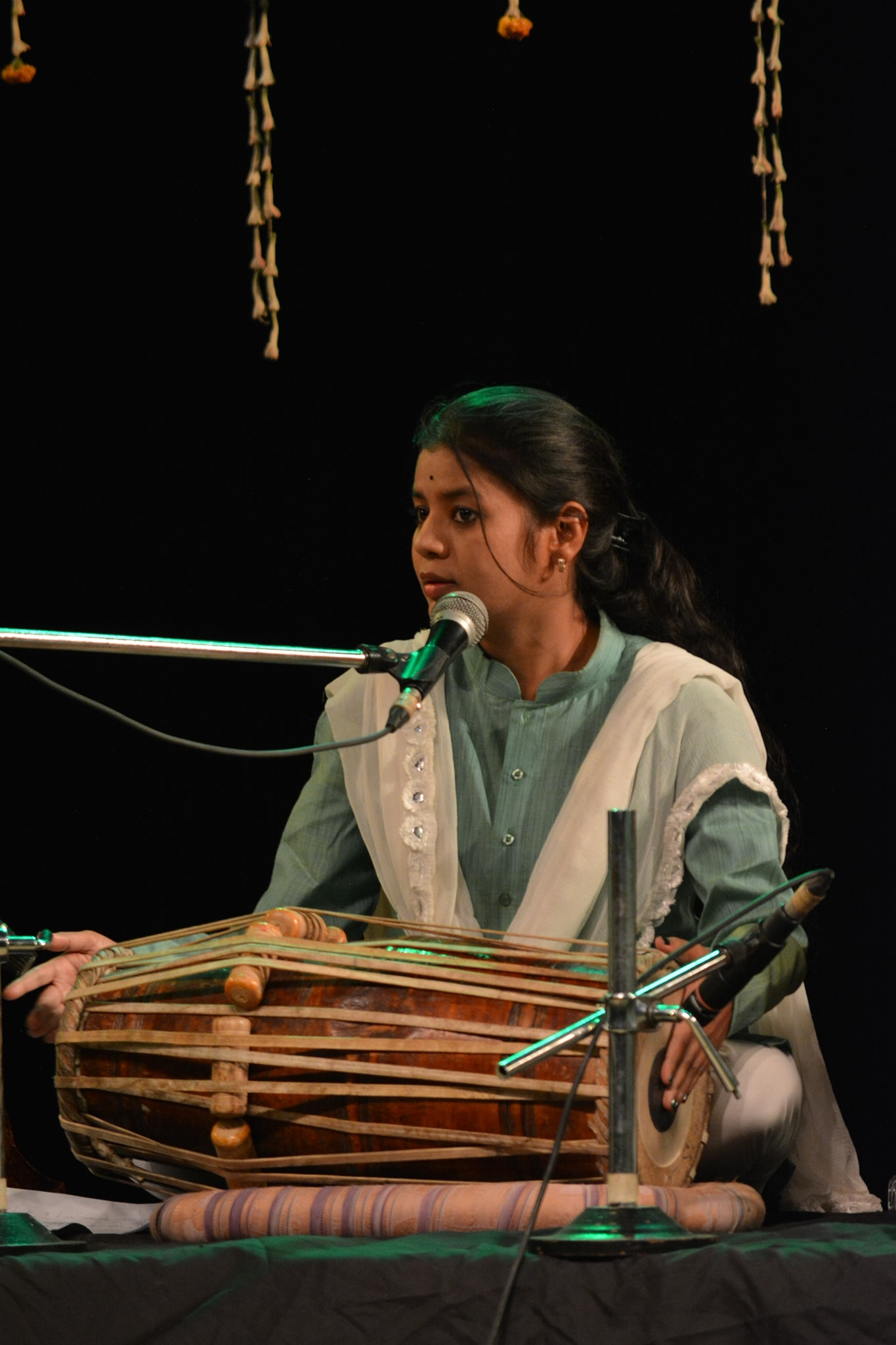
Silpika Maharana, the granddaughter of Guru Dr. Banamali Maharana, performed with Mardala academy Bhubaneswar at the 16th Guru Pranam Utsav 2022

- Late Sri Gangadhar Pradhan
- Dhaneswar Swain
- Niranjan Patra
- Gandhi Mallick
- Prafulla Mangaraj
- Sukadev Swain
- Janardan Das
- Satchidananda Das
- Kalandi Charan Parida
- Gouranga Mahala
- Prafulla Kumar Sahoo
- Jagannath Kunar
- Bijaya Kumar Barik
- Surendra Maharana
- Suryanarayan Pani
- Anil Kumar Parikshya
- Khyamanidhi Pradhan
- Budhanath Swain
- Pratap Kumar Panda
- Arun Mishra
- Niranjan Sahoo
- Dibakar Parida
- Manoranjan Mohanty
- Jagannath Mishra
- Subash Chandra Panda
- Bibhuti Balabanta Ray
- G Ram Prasad
- Manash Kumar Sarangi
- Tarini Das
- Late Sai Ranjan Panigrahi
- Prasant Kumar Pani
- Prasanta Kumar Das
- Rakesh Kumar Behera
- Saumaya Ranjan Nayak
- Janabi Behera
- Silipika Maharana
- Puspika Maharana
- Bina (Koria)

Maharana's granddaughter, Silpika Maharana, is Odisha's first female Mardala performer. She wishes to carry forward the family legacy along with her job as a lecturer in economics.

== Awards ==
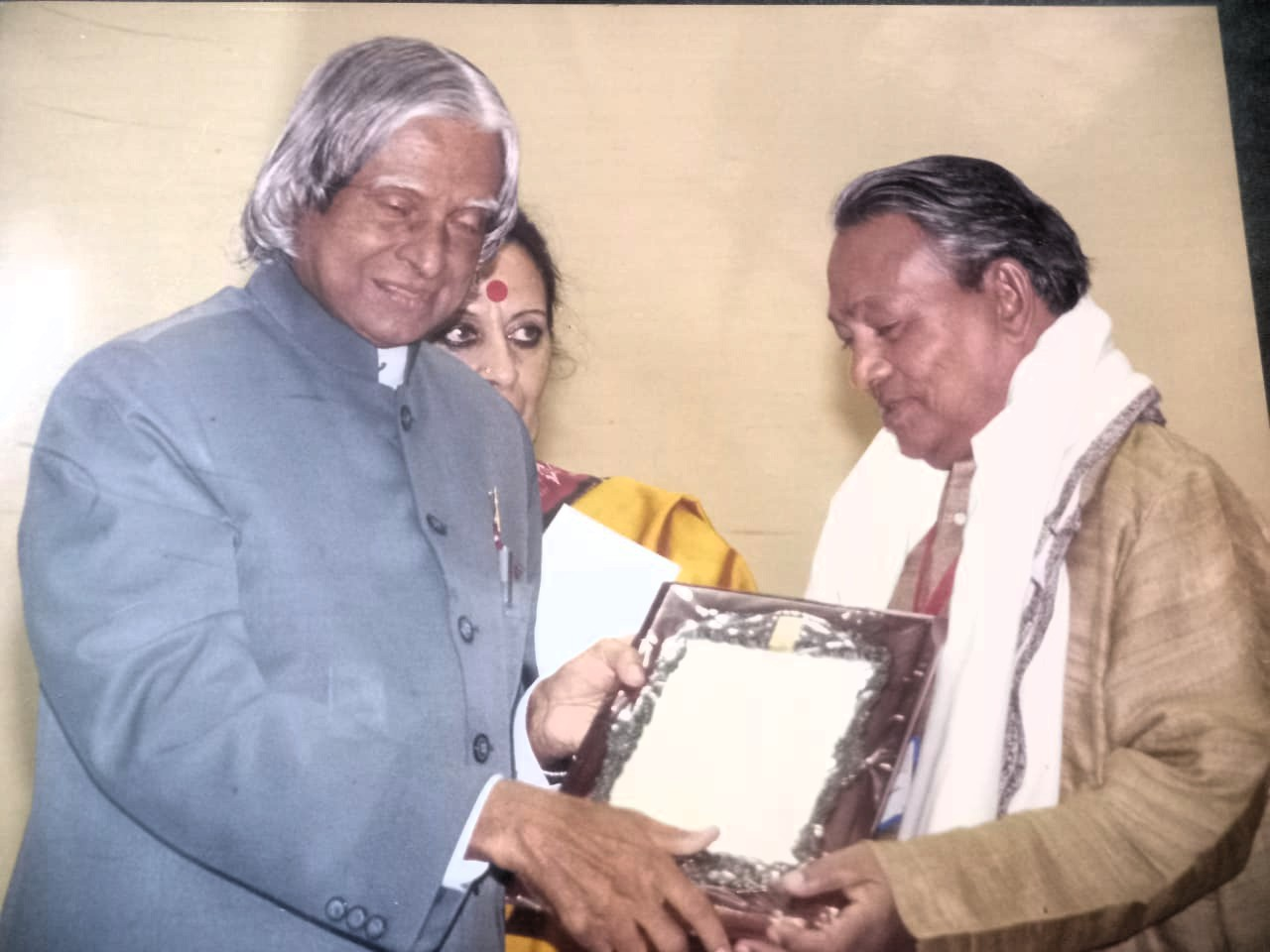
Banamali Maharana received the Sangeet Natak Akademi Award 2003 from President A.P.J. Abdul Kalam in recognition of his contribution to Odissi music at a ceremony held in New Delhi on October 27, 2004

=== National Level Awards ===
- National Sangeet Natak Academy Award (2004)
- Orissa Sangeet Natak Academy Award (1994)
- Kabi Samrat Upendra Bhanja Samman (2016)
- D.Lit Award (2012) - Utkal Sanskruti Biswa Vidyalaya
- Vadya Saraswati (1997–98)
- Vadya Vidyadhar (1998)
- Kalinga Kala Samman (1998)
- Shri Jagannath Purskar (1999)
- Vadyashree Award (2004)
- Sanskruti O Sanskruti Sanman (2004)
- Sinhari Samman (2005)
- Sanjukata Panigrahi Award (2005)
- Guru Kelucharan Mohapatra Award
- Utkal Pathaka Sansad Vadya Sidhi Sadhak Award (2006)
- Bibidha Bama Sanskrutika Samman (2006)
- Udra Pankaj Samman Award (2006)
- Uttkala ATMA (2006)
- Paramparik Badya Sidha Sadhika (2006)
- Nada Bramha (2008)
- Odishi Sangeet Mahosav (2008)
- Gandharv Samman (2009)
- Gandharav Kala Samman (2009)
- Abhimanyu Smruti Sansad (2009)
- Bharati Nrutya Mandir (2010)
- Uttkal Pratibha Samman (2011)
- Satyabadi Samman (2011)
- Gotipua Dance Festival Award (2011)
- Rajib Samman (2013)
- Swaratirth Chandan Prativa Samman (2013)
- Joyti Kalamandir Samman (2013)
- Raurakela Basant Samman (2013)
- Parampara Samman (2013)
- Anandshree Samman (2014)
- Gurushree Samman (2014)
- Guru Singhari Samman (2015)
- Nrutyayan Samman (2016)
- Debaprasad Samman (2016)
- Nrutyangana Samman (2015–16)
- Kapila Samman (2017)
- Pracheen Kala Kendra Chandigarh Mardala Maestro Samman (2018)
- Sangeet Sudhakar Balakrushna Das Memorial Samman (2018)
