= Simanchal Patro =

Indian performing artist (born 1927)

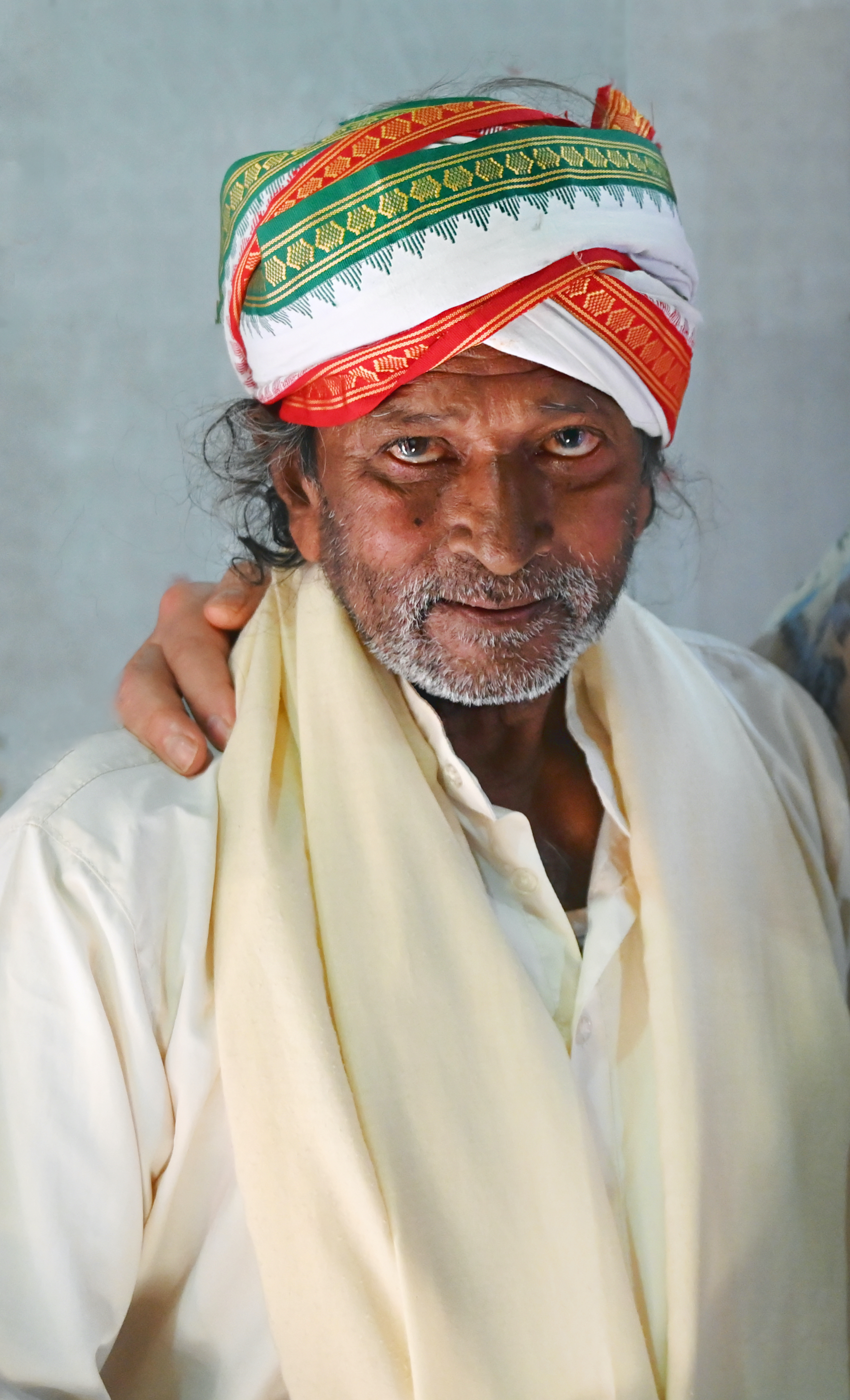
- Patro at his village Bamakei, 2020

Background information
- Born: 2 February 1927 (age 99); Bamakei, Ganjam district, Odisha, India
- Genres: Prahallada Nataka

Simanchal Patro (Odia: ସୀମାଞ୍ଚଳ ପାତ୍ର; born 2 February 1927) is an Indian performing artist and exponent of Prahallada Nataka, a traditional ritual theatre form of Odisha. He is best known for his portrayal of the lead character Hiranyakasipu, a role he has performed for over five decades. Patro is a recipient of the Sangeet Natak Akademi Award (1990) and is widely credited with preserving and popularizing the Prahallada Nataka tradition in the Ganjam district. He has been selected for the Padma Shri in January 2026.

== Early life ==
Simanchala Patro was born on 2 February 1927 in the village of Bamakei (Bomakei) in the Digapahandi block of Ganjam district, Odisha. He was born to Sura Patro and Bangari Debi. His family had a traditional affinity for the arts; his father, Sura Patro, was also a Prahllada Nataka guru and artist.

== Artistic areer ==
=== Training ===
Patro's father trained him in Prahallada Nataka, and Patro learned the initial role of Prahallada and later the songs of the Sutradhara. He later underwent rigorous training for 20 years under second-generation Prahallada Nataka masters, including Sri Kora Patra, Sri Laxman Satapathy, and later Sri Trinath Pradhan. Under their tutelage, he mastered various aspects of the art form, including dialogue delivery, Raga (melodic framework), Tala (rhythm), Thani (stylized poses), and acting techniques.

=== Performance ===
Patro rose to prominence at the age of 20 when he performed the lead role of Hiranyakashipu in a play organized in his village, Bamakei. He established the Lakshmi Nrusimha Natya Kala Sansad troupe in his village Bamakei and taught several students at his akhada.

He is renowned for his powerful vocal ability and physical stamina. Prahlad Natak performances traditionally last up to 12 hours, requiring the protagonist to sing over 300 songs composed in more than 35 ragas of classical Odissi music. Patro's high-pitched, sonorous voice and commanding stage presence made his portrayal of the demon king definitive, earning him the moniker "The Hiranyakashipu" in the region. He has performed extensively across India, including in major cities like Delhi, Calcutta (Kolkata), and Madras (Chennai).

== Contribution and legacy ==
Patro played a significant role in the preservation of Prahallada Nataka amid the decline of traditional folk arts. To ensure the continuity of the tradition, he established several akhadas (traditional training centers) across the Ganjam district, including in Nalabanta, Humma, Khajipalli, Sundhipalli, Padmapur, and Badagada.

== Awards and recognition ==
- 1990: Sangeet Natak Akademi Award, presented by the President of India for his contribution to Prahlad Natak.
- 2026: Padma Shri Award, presented by the President of India for his exceptional contribution to the field of Art.
