= Khanjani =

Percussion musical instrument

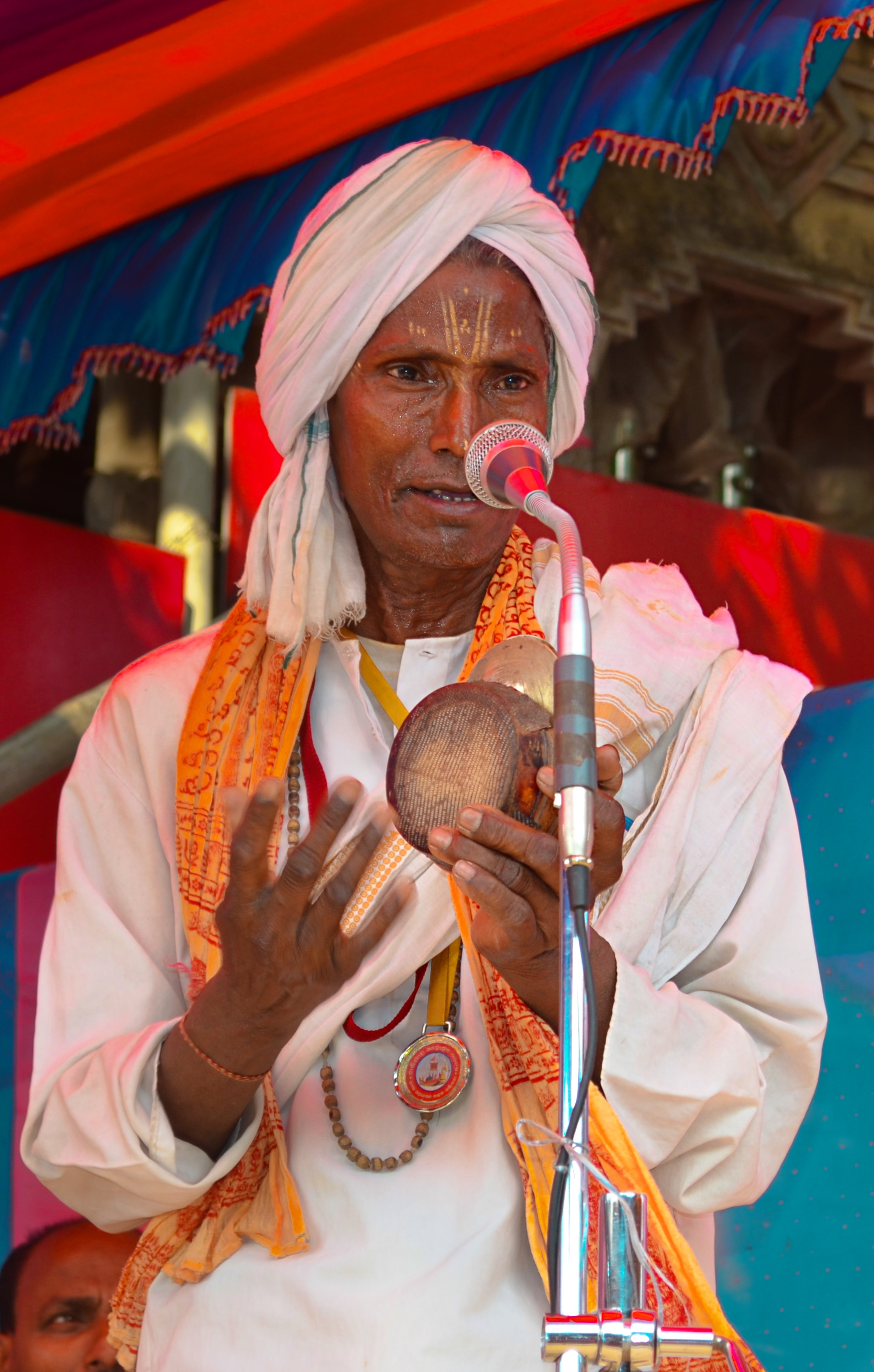
Man playing Khanjani during the Rukuna Ratha Jatra of Lingaraja, Bhubaneswar, Odisha

Khanjani is a percussion musical instrument, a variety of Daf, found in West Bengal & Odisha.
