= Mardala =

Classical instrument of East Indian state of Odisha

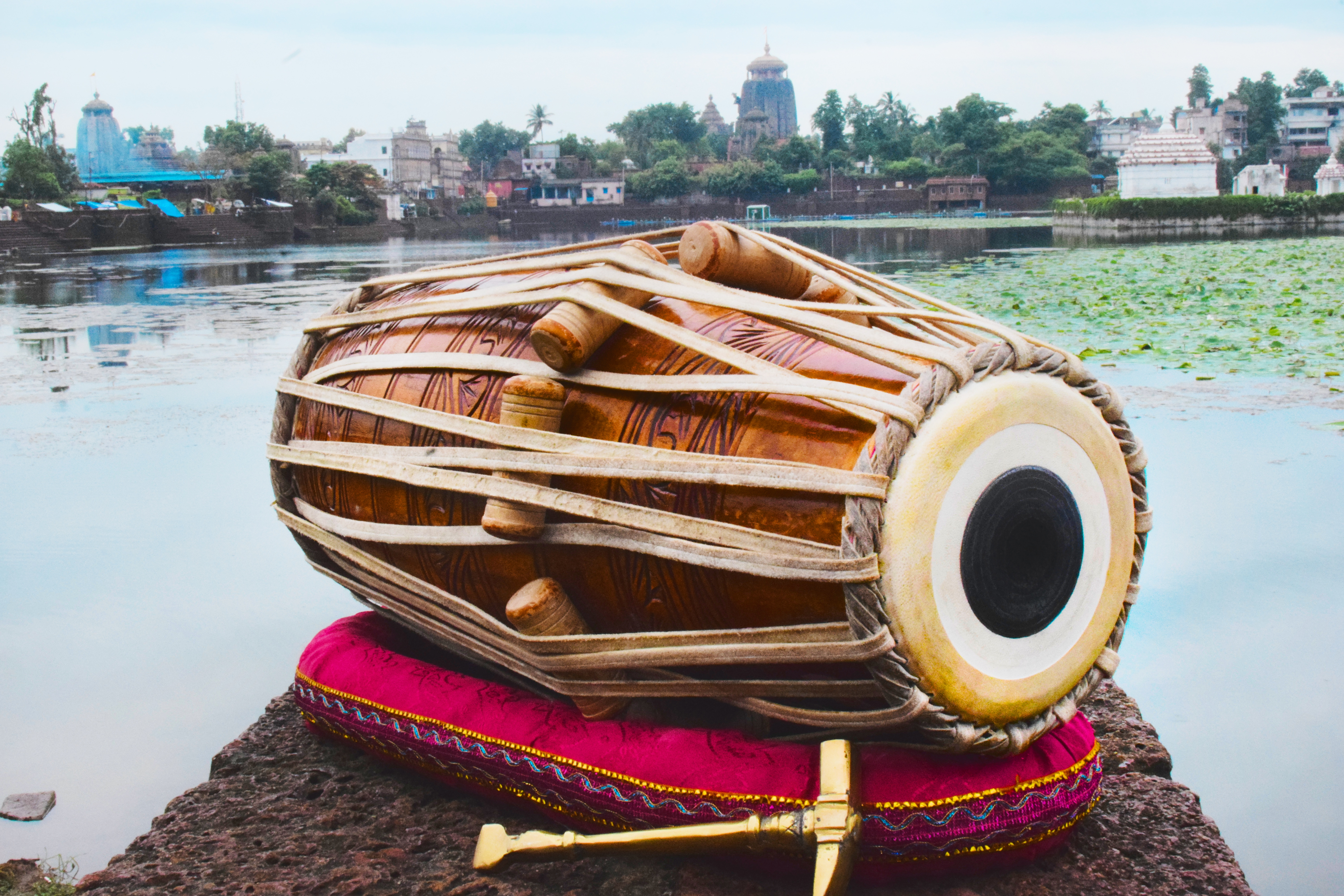
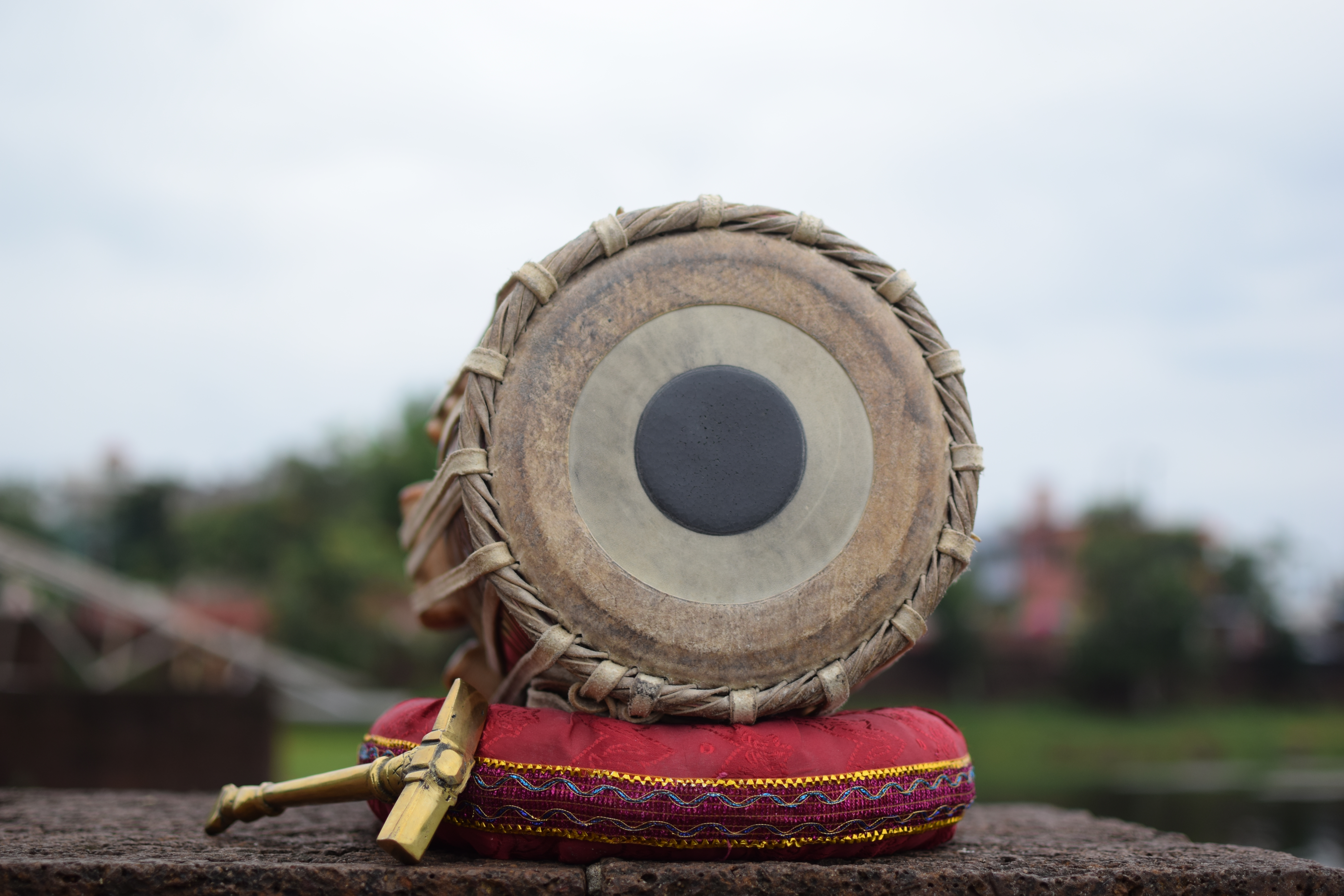
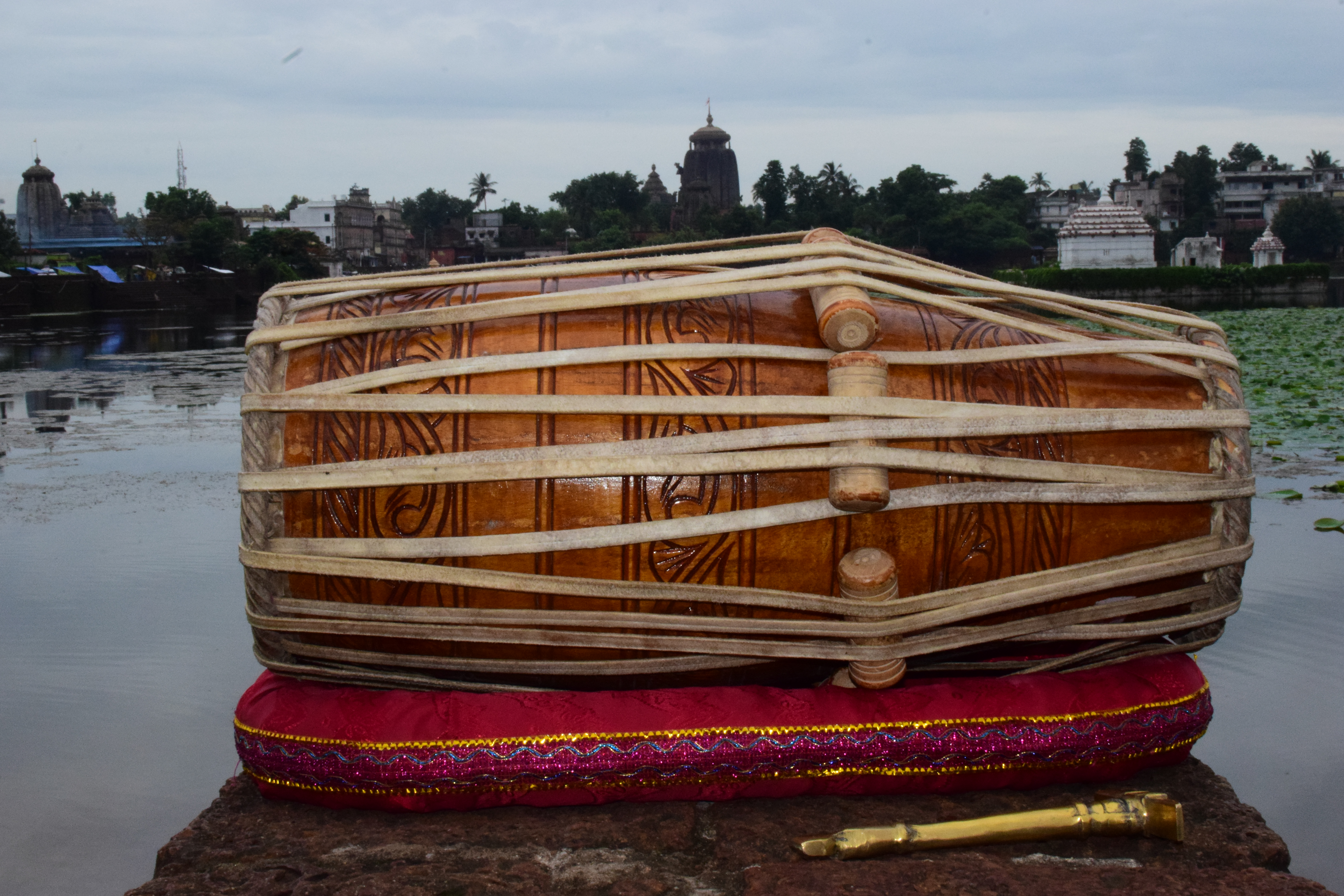
- Various views of a Mardala

Percussion instrument
- Other names: Odissi Mardala
- Hornbostel–Sachs classification: 211.222.1 (Membranophone directly struck by hand)
- Volume: medium

Musicians
- Adiguru Singhari Shyamsundar Kar, Guru Kelucharan Mahapatra, Guru Mahadeba Rout, Guru Banamali Maharana, Guru Dhaneswar Swain, Guru Sachidananda Das

More articles or information
- Odissi music

Mardala (Odia: ମର୍ଦ୍ଦଳ, romanized: Mardaḷa, Odia: [mɔrd̪d̪ɔl̪ɔ]) is a classical percussive instrument native to the east Indian state of Odisha, traditionally used as the primary accompaniment in Odissi classical music. The instrument is slightly different from other instruments (like Madal, Mridangam, etc.) that might have similar names in the Indian subcontinent due to its unique construction, acoustic features and traditional playing technique.

The Mardala is used in a wide range of traditional art forms of Odisha, including Gotipua, Mahari, Odissi dance, Bhagabata Tungi, Sakhi Nata, Prahallada Nataka, Ramalila, Krusnalila, Rama Nataka, Sahi Jata, Medha Nacha, Bharata Lila, Bhutakeli Nata, Odisi Kirtana and more.

== History ==
Odishan musicologists in ancient treatises have mentioned four distinct kinds of instruments or vadyas : tat or stringed instruments, susira or wind instruments, anaddha or leather instruments / drums & finally ghana or metallic instruments.

Out of these four, the Mardala falls under the category of anaddha vadyas or drums. Raghunatha Ratha, an ancient musicologist of Odisha extols the Mardala in his treatise, the Natya Manorama as:

ānaddhe marddaḻaḥ śreṣṭho
yatastallakṣaṇaṃbrube /

Translation:

Among the membranophones,
Mardala is the superlative.
Herefrom I narrate its features.

The Jagannatha temple of Puri has for centuries had a Mardala servitor. This was known as the 'Madeli Seba' and the percussionist was ritually initiated into the temple by the Gajapati ruler. The Mardala used to be the accompanying instrument to the Mahari dance, the ancestor of present-day Odissi dance, one of the major classical dance forms of India.

In hundreds of Kalingan temples across the state of Odisha, including famous shrines such as Mukteswara and Konarka, the Mardala features prominently, usually in a niche of an alasakanya playing the instrument. There is a pose by the name mardalika replicating the same stance in Odissi dance.

== Construction ==
=== Wood ===
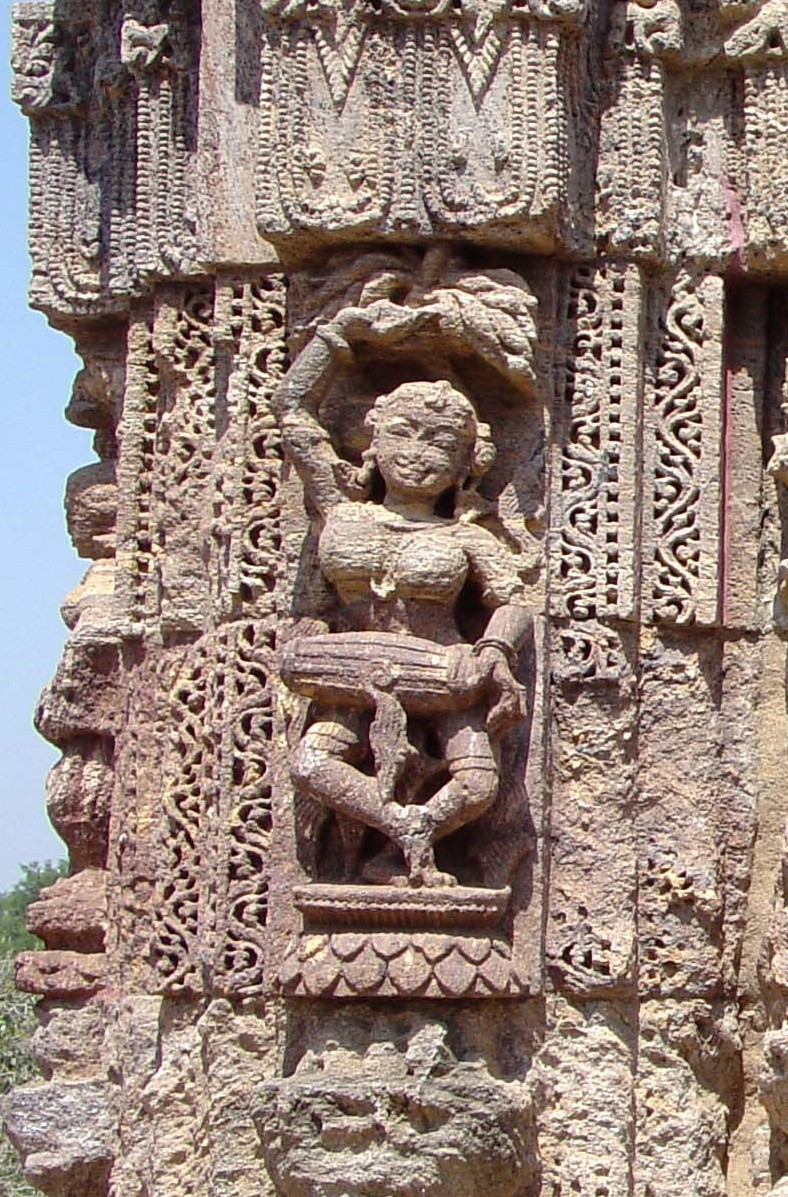
A lady playing Mardala in a frieze at the Sun Temple of Konark

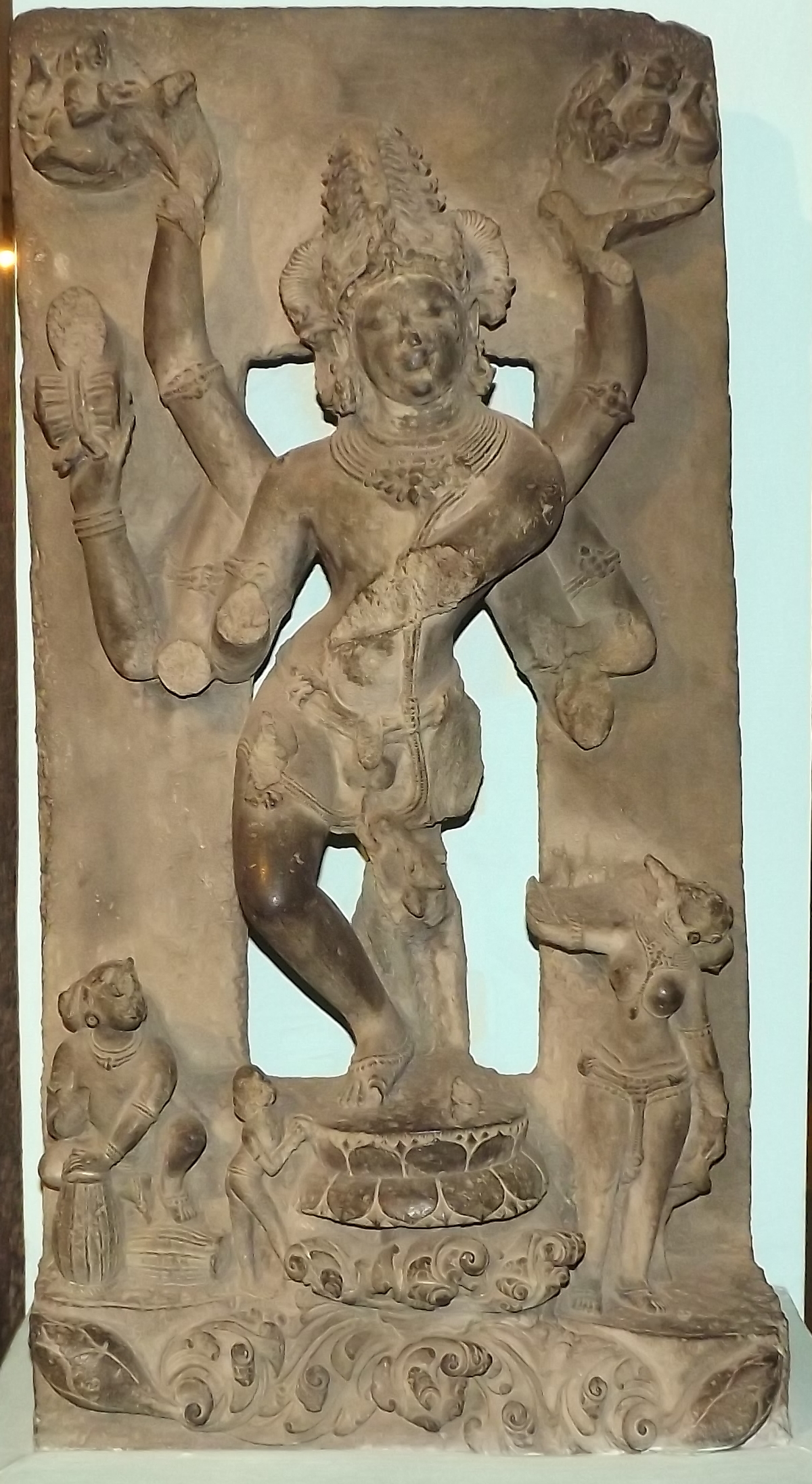
An image of dancing Shiva (Natambara in Odisha parlance). Notice a mardala player in the bottom left corner, observing Shiva's footsteps to replicate the rhythm. The mardala depicted is identical to the instrument in use to this date.

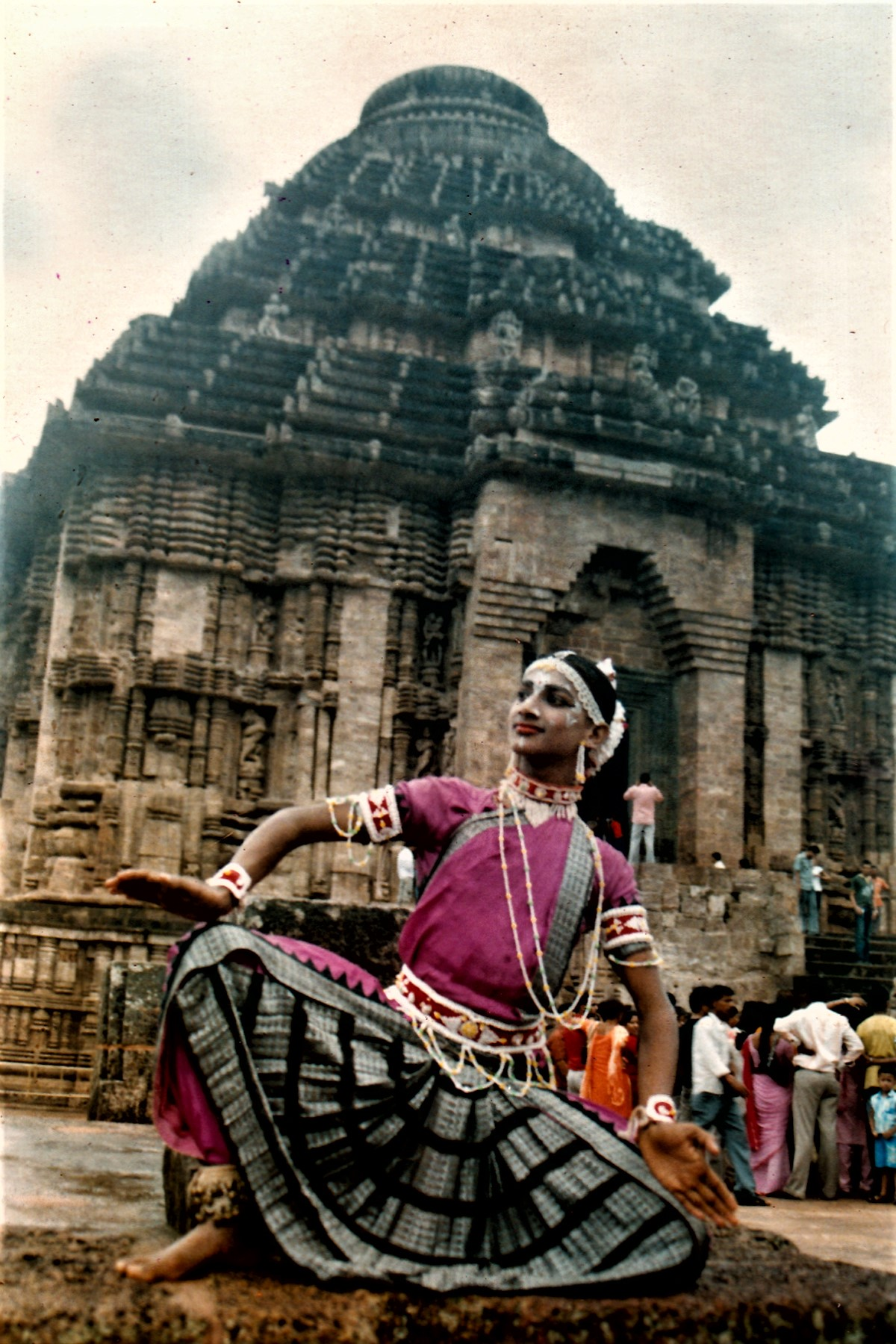
Mardala playing (Madeli) stance in Gotipua

All woods are not suitable for constructing the Mardala. According to treatises, the ideal Mardala is made of khadira (khaira) or the wood of Acacia catechu. The wood of raktachandana is also spoken of highly owing to its deep resonance. Other woods such as nimba, mahalimba and gambhari are also used. An instrument fashioned from the aforesaid woods is considered uttama, whereas an instrument made from the wood of jackfruit is considered adhama.

=== Measurements ===
Natya Manorama ordains the Mardala to be about one and a half cubits long. The left face must be between twelve and thirteen angulas and the right face half or one angula less than the left face.

=== Making ===
The process of making a Mardala is described in detail in the Natya Manorama. The Mardala is thicker at the middle than its ends. A paste called kharali is applied on the playing face of the Mardala in a round shape. The preparation of kharali is a time-consuming and delicate process, requiring the ingredients of paunsa (ash), geru (red chalk), bhata (boiled rice), chuda (flattened rice), harida (fruit of black myrobalan tree) and sour gruel. This is applied to the right face of the Mardala. The purika is applied on the left face to produce a pleasant sound. The preparation of the purika uses bhata (boiled rice), lia (blown rice) or paunsa (ash). Once done, the instrument is sun-dried. Once dried, the paste is reapplied and again sundried, and this process is repeated for at least twelve times before adjudging the shruti (tone) of the instrument. Then the instrument is tied strongly with pata-suta or leather strips and ready to be played.

== Repertoire and technique ==
The playing of the Mardala is based on the tala-paddhati or rhythmic system of Odissi music. A tala is a rhythmic structure in Indian music. The talas in use in Odissi music are distinctive, and are not found in other systems of Indian music. The playing of the instrument follows a strict classical grammar.

Traditionally, there are ten vital features of tala that are taken care of:

1. kāla or beats
2. mārga or inter-beat transitions
3. kriyā or hand movements
4. anga
5. graha
6. jāti
7. kalā
8. laya
9. jati
10. prastāra

The kriyas are either nisabda, that is without-sound or sasabda, with sound. The nisabda or soundless kriyas are demonstrated by four types of motions; there is no stroke. The sasabda or sounded kriyas are created by striking a membrane. Apart from these, there are eight desi-kriyas. The regional terminology used in the Mardala's context are kalā, ansā, māna, aḍasā, bhaunri, bhaunri aḍasā, tāli, khāli, phānka, bāṇi, ukuṭa, pāṭa, chhanda, bhangi, etc. The sabda-swara pata, a traditional component based on the Mardala's beats was integrated into Odissi dance by Guru Deba Prasad Das.

Though several hundred talas are defined in treatises, some are more common : ekatāli, khemaṭā or jhulā, rūpaka, tripaṭā, jhampā, āḍatāli, jati, āditala, maṭhā. Other talas that are also used are sarimāna, nihsāri, kuḍuka, aḍḍa, duāḍamāna, upāḍḍa, panchutāla (nabapanchu tala), paḍitāla, pahapaṭa, aṭṭatāla, āṭhatāli and jagannātha tāla. The talas have a characteristic swing that is typical of and universally found in Odissi music. The details of some major talas are listed below.

| | Tala | Matra | Bibhaga | Chhanda |
|---|---|---|---|---|
| 1 | ekatāli | 4 | 1 | 4 |
| 2 | khemaṭā | 6 | 2 | 3 + 3 |
| 3 | rūpaka | 6 | 2 | 2 + 4 |
| 4 | tripaṭā | 7 | 3 | 3+ 2 + 2 |
| 5 | jhampā | 10 | 4 | 2 + 3 + 2 + 3 |
| 6 | āḍatāli | 14 | 4 | 4 + 3 + 4 + 3 |
| 7 | jati | 14 | 4 | 3 + 4 + 3 + 4 |
| 8 | sarimāna | 14 | 4 | 4 + 2 + 4 + 4 |
| 9 | nihsāri | 10 | 4 | 3 + 2 + 3 + 2 |

=== Padi ===
An exclusive technique called paḍi is frequently employed in traditional Odissi songs. This is composed within the fixed prosody of the respective song. The padi is repeated in several different talas, layas and from different matras. Kabichandra Dr. Kali Charan Patnaik calls this feature 'the lifeline of Odissi music'.

== Gurus ==
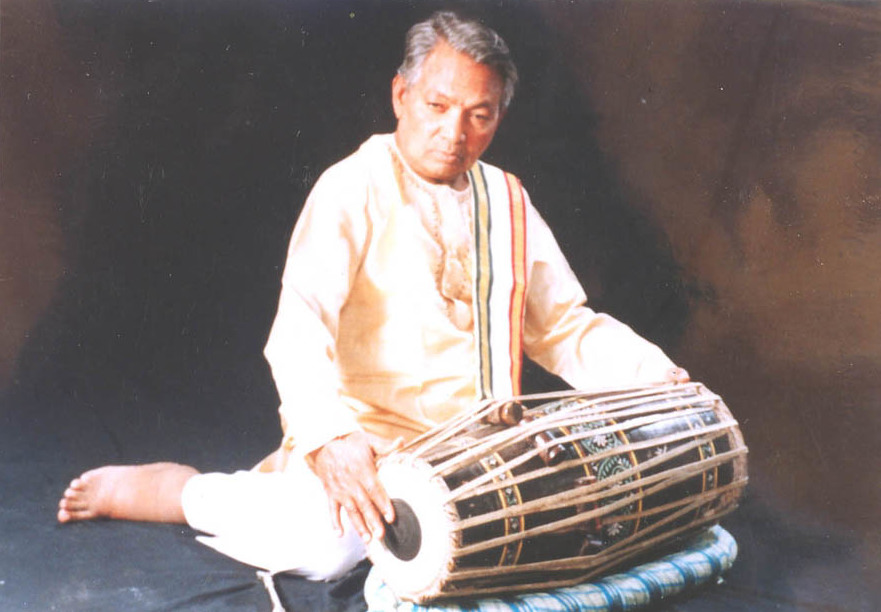
Guru Banamali Maharana, who received a 2004 Sangeet Natak Akademi Award for his contribution to Odissi Music and the Mardala

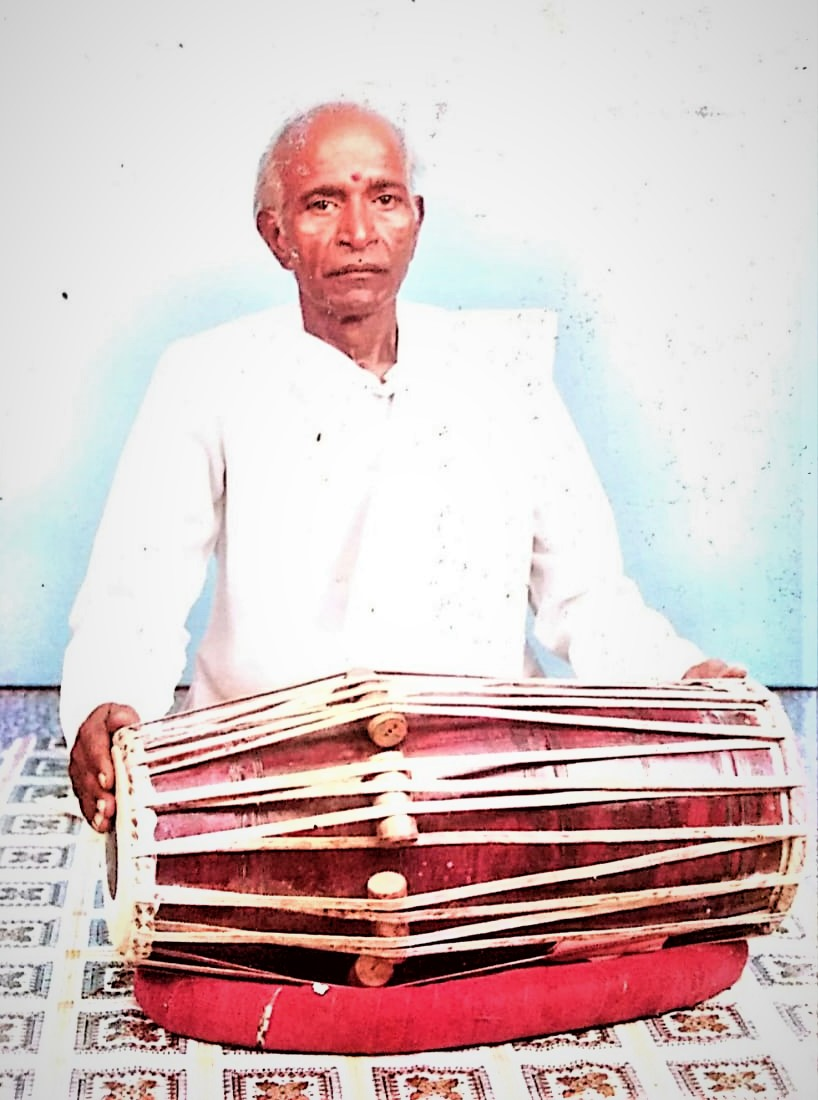
Guru Mahadeba Rout, recipient of Odisha Sangeet Natak Akademi Award and 'Pandita' epithet from the Government of Odisha

The Mardala is intimately associated with the Jagannatha temple and thus has a very esteemed position in the culture of Odisha. Many Gurus have worked for carrying forward the legacy of the instrument. Adiguru Singhari Shyamsundar Kar, Guru Banamali Maharana, Guru Padmanabha Panda, Guru Basudeba Khuntia, Guru Mahadeba Rout, Guru Narayana Mahapatra, Guru Banamali Maharana and Guru Kelucharan Mahapatra were among the great Gurus of Mardala in the 20th century.

Guru Rabinarayan Panda, Guru Jayadeba Giri, Guru Janardana Dash, Guru Dhaneswar Swain, Guru Sachidananda Das, Guru Bijaya Kumar Barik, Guru Jagannath Kuanr are among modern-day exponents of the Mardala. Many veteran Gotipua masters have also excelled in the Mardala : Guru Birabara Sahu, Guru Lingaraj Barik, Guru Maguni Das and others.

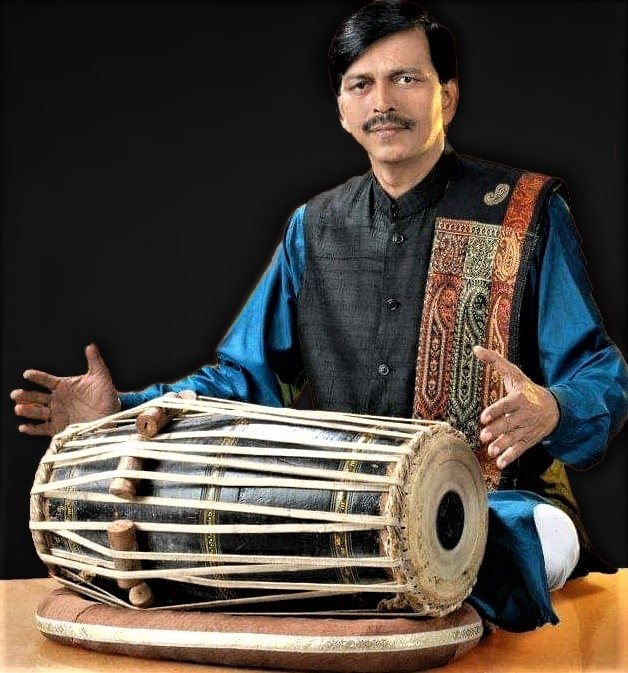
Guru Dhaneswar Swain, recipient of Sangeet Natak Akademi Award in the year 2013 for his contribution to Odissi Music and Mardala

=== As a solo instrument ===
The role of the Mardala as a solo instrument has been presented for the last few decades with great success, apart from its better-known role as an accompaniment in the ensemble for Odissi music and dance. The solo performances follow a specific rule or pranali : starting with a jamana, then proceeding onto chhanda prakarana, ragada, etc. Guru Dhaneswar Swain, the first solo Mardala player who have presented a solo performance on Mardala under the able guidance of Guru Banamali Maharana at Rabidra Mandap, Bhubaneswar which was very first of its kind.

=== Training ===
Two state government institutions impart training in Mardala : Utkal Sangeet Mahavidyalaya and Utkal University of Culture. Undergraduate, postgraduate degrees are offered. Many private institutions also impart training. Guru Banamali Maharana had established an institute called 'Mardala Academy' in Bhubaneswar, the state capital. Ramahari Das Odissi Gurukul at Biragobindapur, Sakhigopal also offers training in Mardala under Guru Dhaneswar Swain, who also has his own institute called 'Vadya Vani Gurukul' which specialises in traditional percussion instruments of Odisha. Ensembles of traditional musical instruments of Odisha with the mardala taking the lead have also been conceptualised and executed.

Eminent Gurus of Odissi Mardala

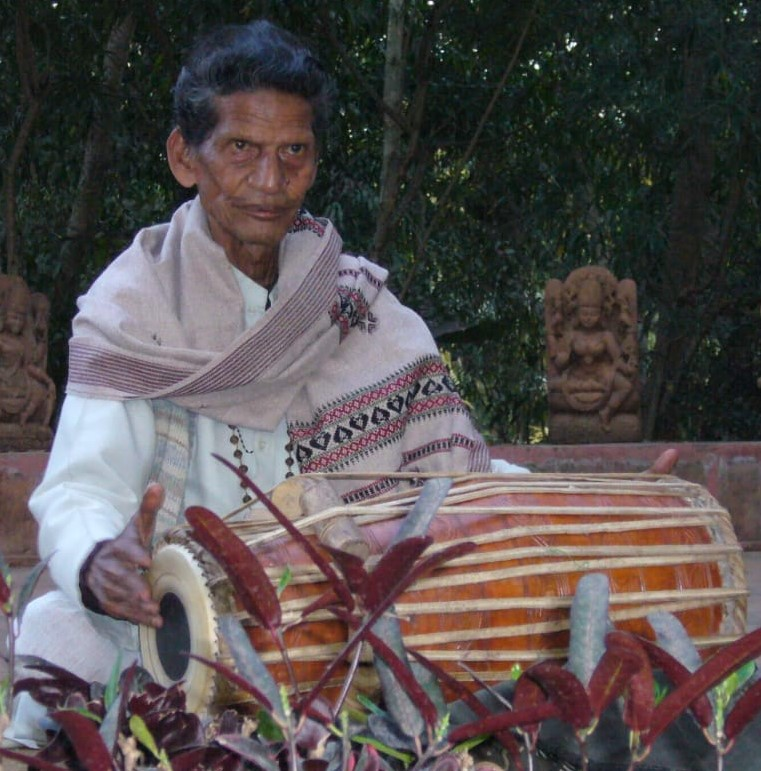
Guru Birabara Sahu, veteran Gotipua exponent

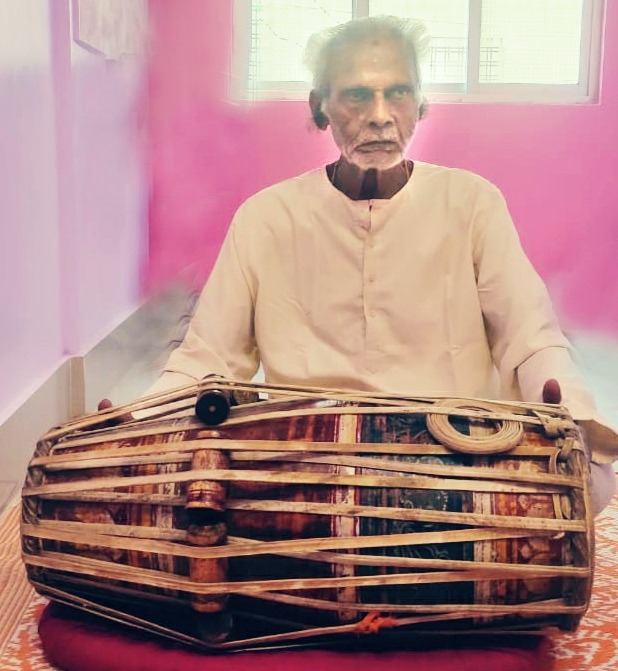
Guru Basudeba Khuntia

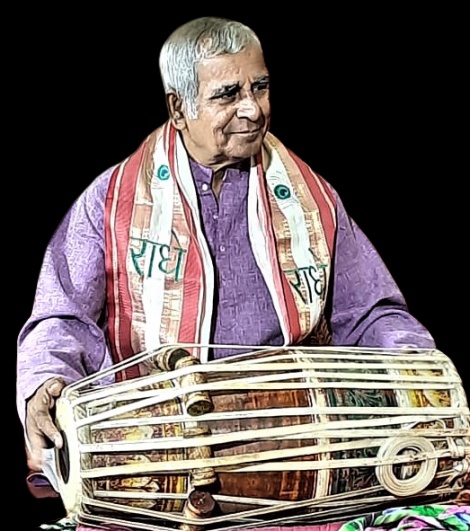
Guru Rabinarayan Panda

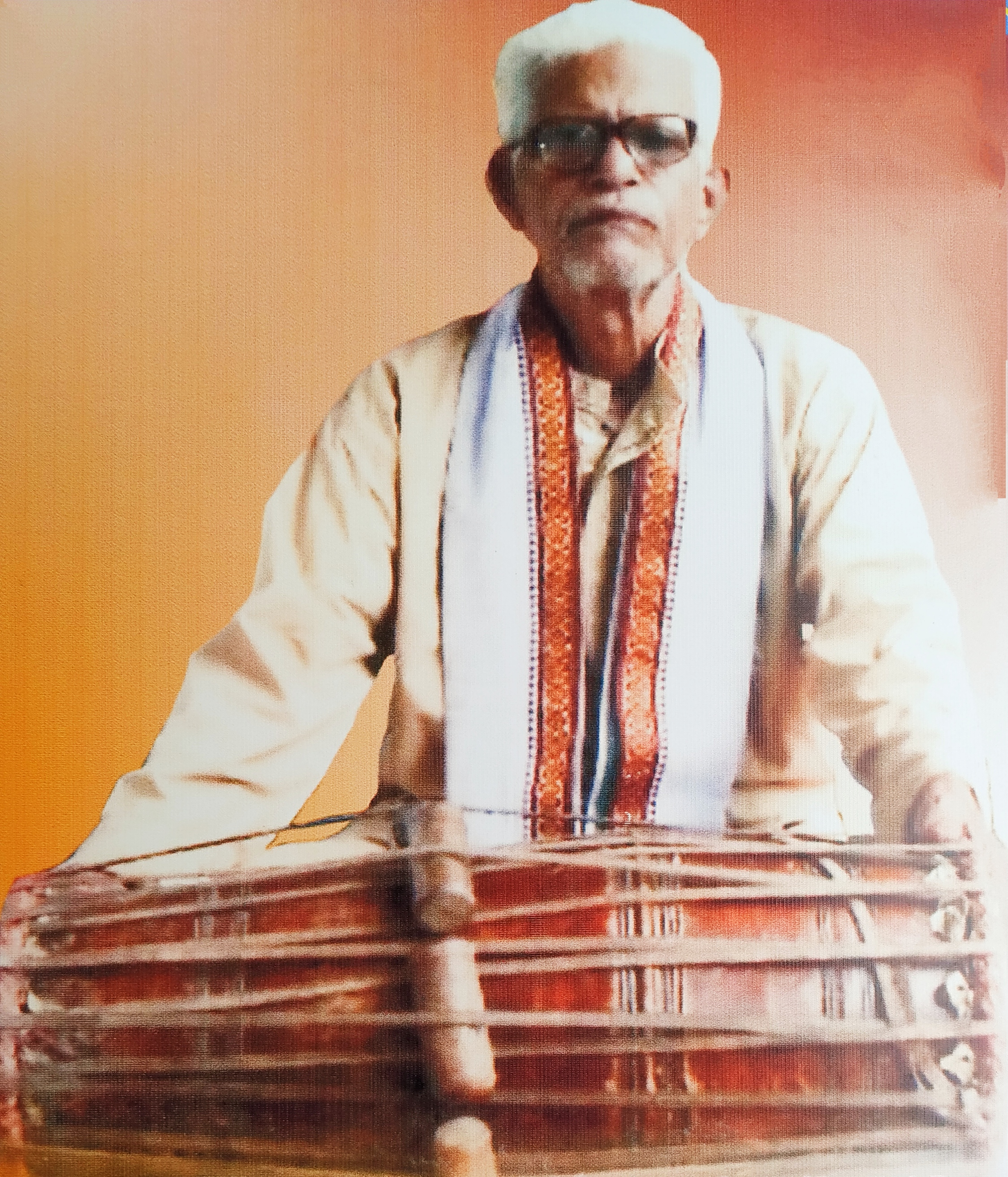
Guru Maguni Das, veteran Gotipua exponent

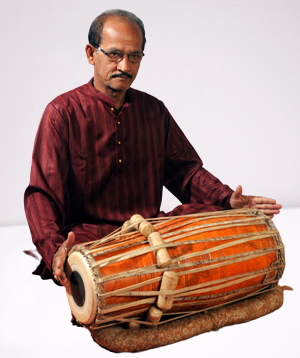
Guru Janardana Dash

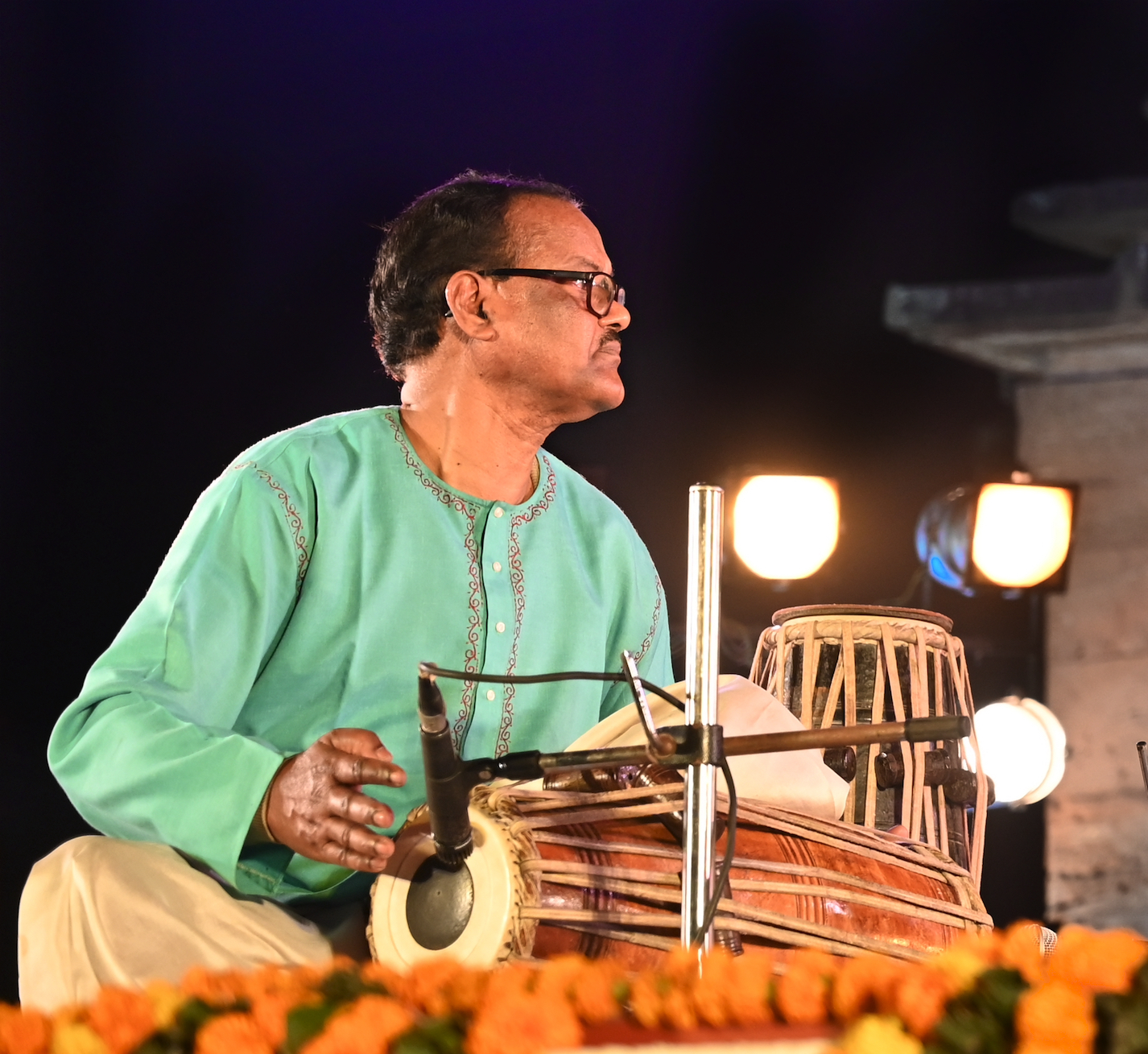
Guru Niranjan Patra

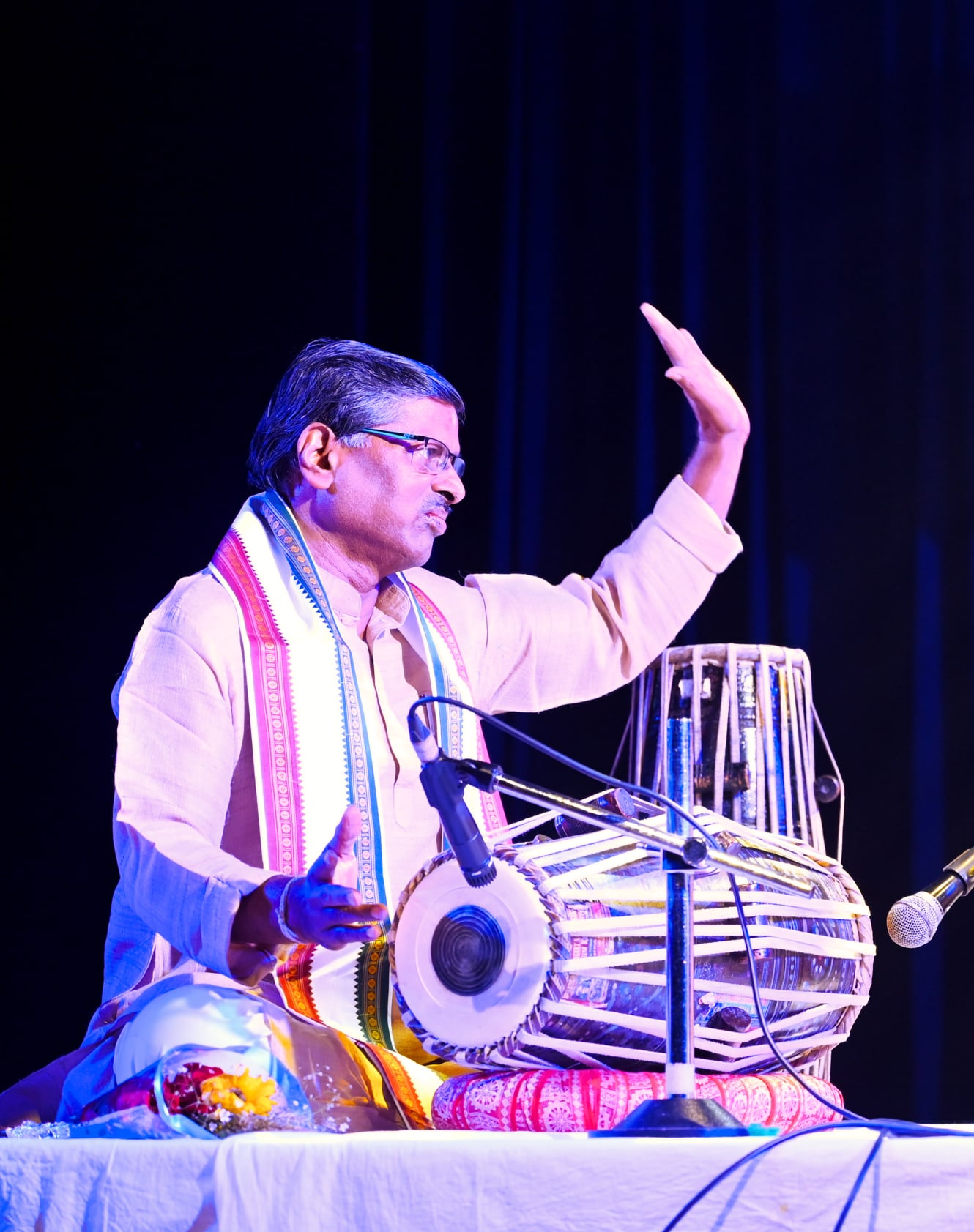
Guru Sachidananda Das, Odisha Sangeet Natak Akademi awardee

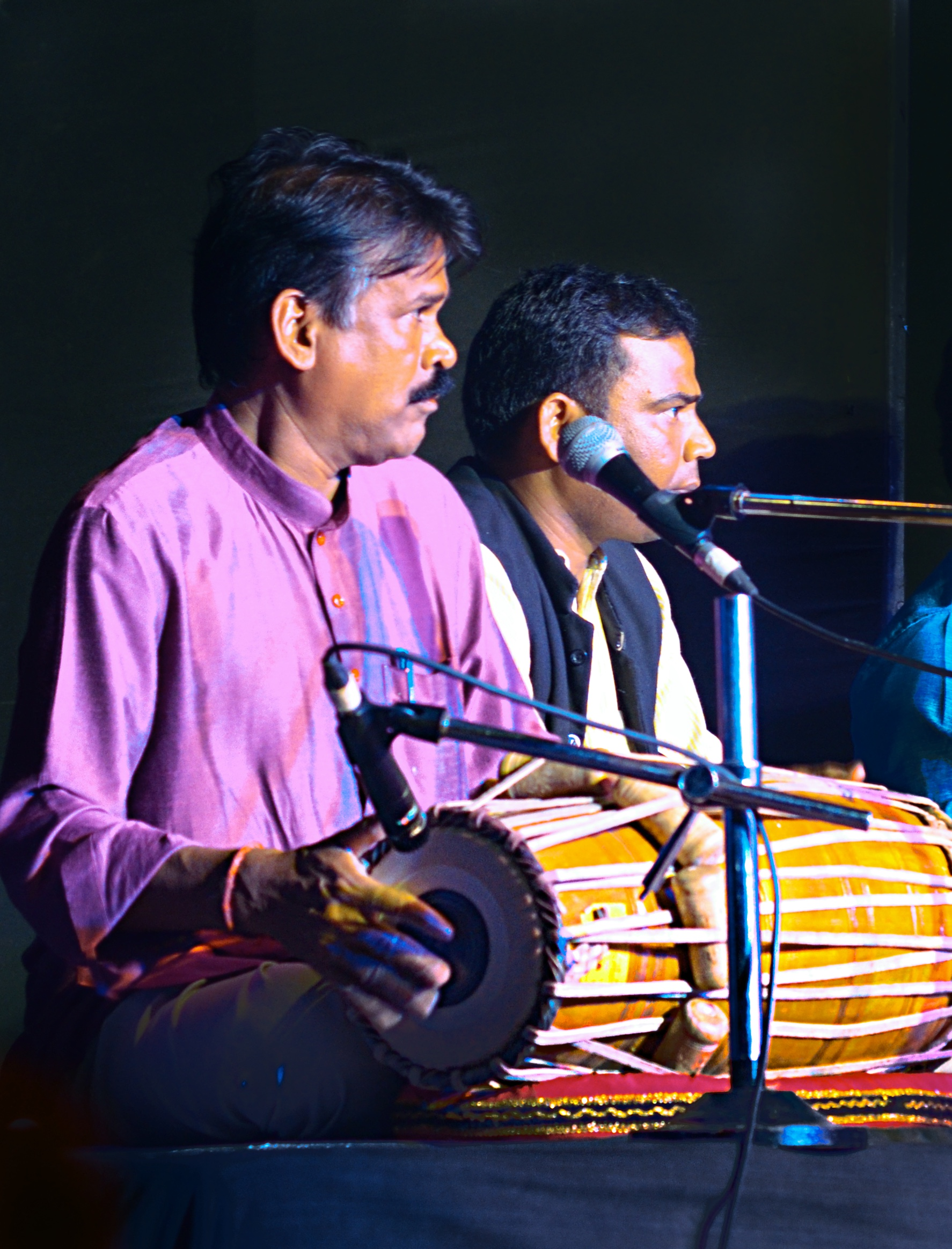
Guru Bijaya Kumar Barik

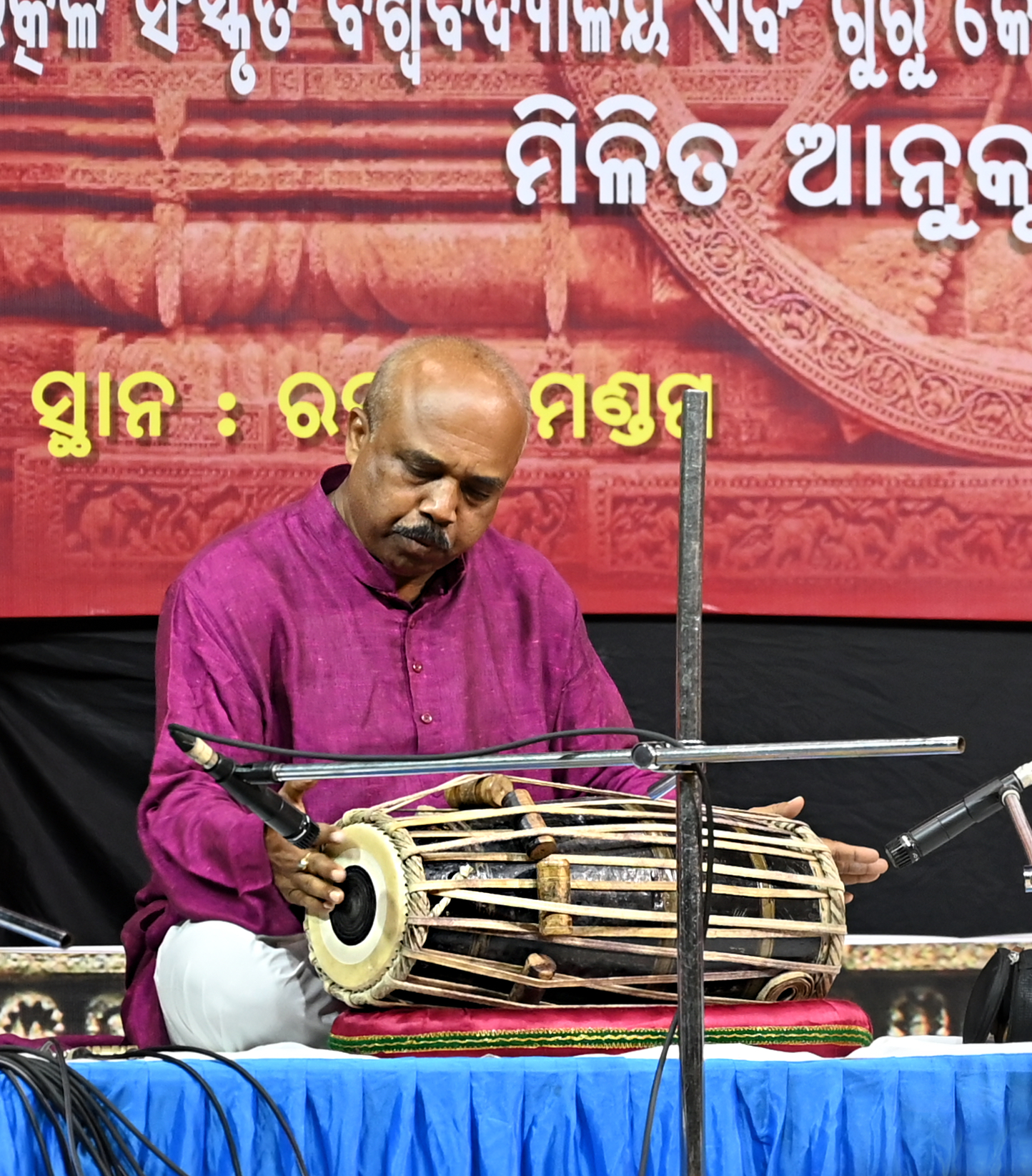
Guru Jagannath Kuanr

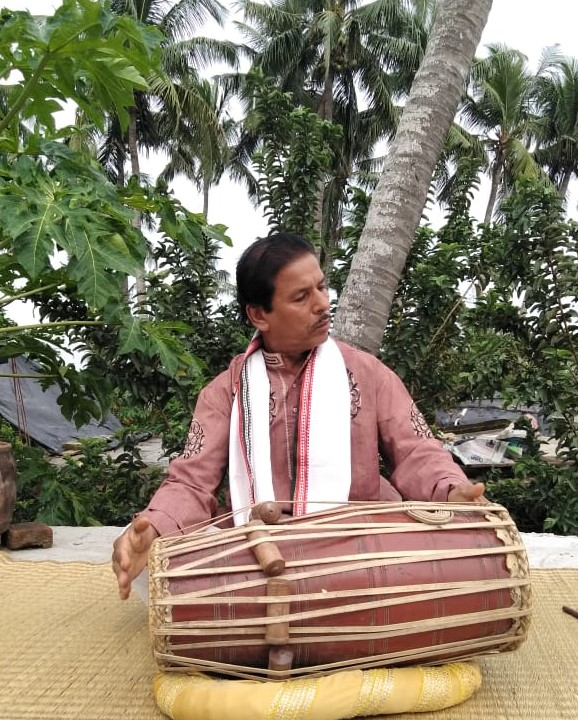
Guru Chintamani Raut

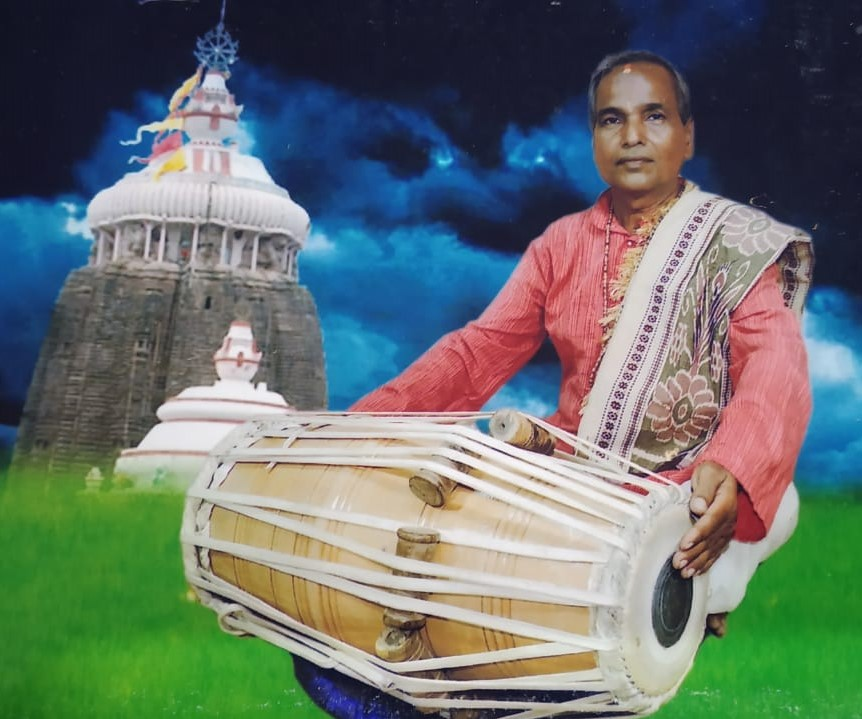
Guru Maheswar Mohapatra

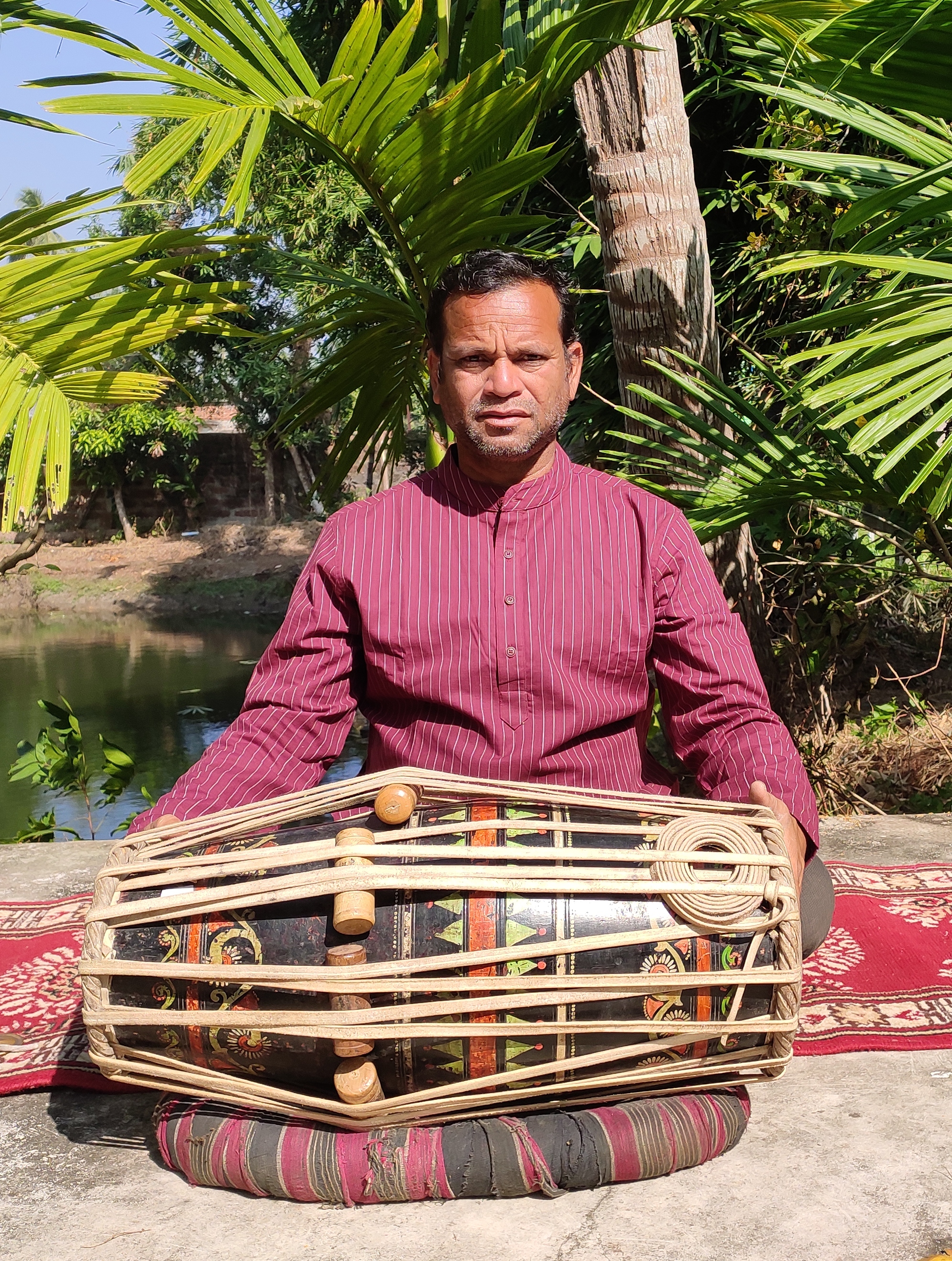
Guru Sarat Kumar Samantaray

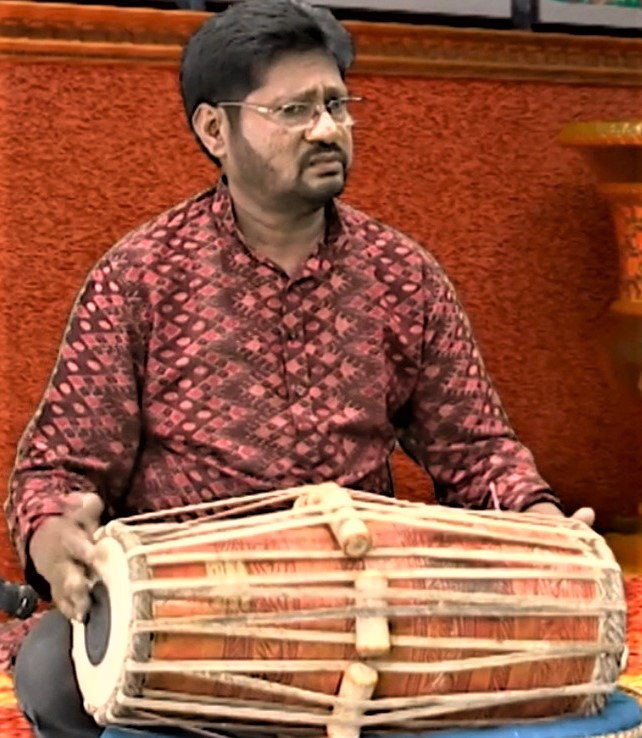
Guru Gouranga Charan Mahala

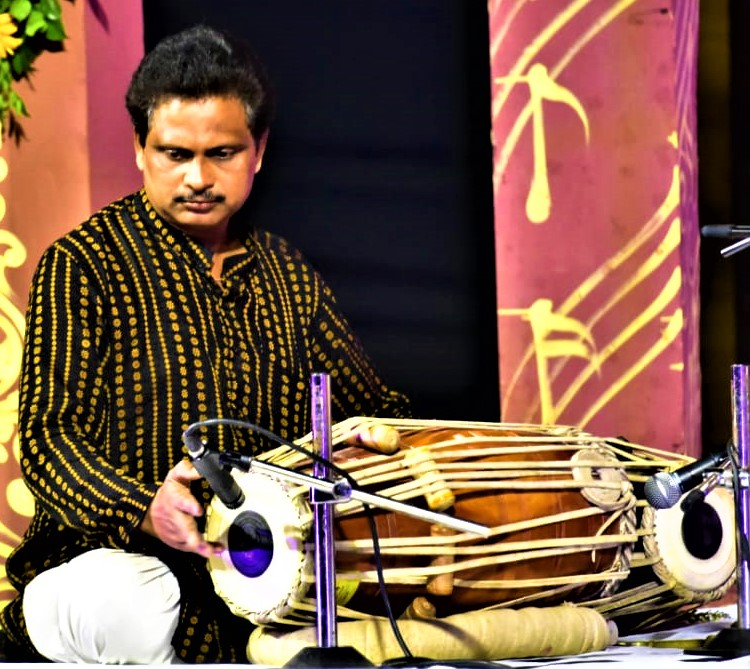
Guru Dibakar Parida

== See also ==
- Odissi music
- Odissi dance
- Gotipua
- Prahallada Nataka
- Dhaneswar Swain
