= List of Hindi films of 2009 =

This is a list of films released in 2009. During the year, a producers' strike began after the release of 8 x 10 Tasveer and lasted until the beginning of June.

The highest-grossing film of 2009 was 3 Idiots, which emerged as the highest-grossing Indian film of all time at that point.

== Box office collection ==
No.	Title	Production company	Gross
1	3 Idiots	Reliance Big Pictures; Vinod Chopra Films	₹400.61 crore (US$82.76 million)
2	Love Aaj Kal	Eros International; Illuminati Films	₹119.52 crore (US$24.69 million)
3	Ajab Prem Ki Ghazab Kahani	Tips Industries	₹106.74 crore (US$22.05 million)
4	Wanted	Sahara One Motion Pictures; Eros International; BSK Network & Entertainment	₹93.23 crore (US$19.26 million)
5	Kambakkht Ishq	Eros International; Nadiadwala Grandson Entertainment	₹85.56 crore (US$17.68 million)
6	De Dana Dan	Baba Arts; Hari Om Entertainment; Eros International; Venus Records & Tapes	₹81.85 crore (US$16.91 million)
7	New York	Yash Raj Films	₹78.34 crore (US$16.18 million)
8	Kaminey	UTV Motion Pictures	₹71.57 crore (US$14.79 million)
9	Blue	Shree Ashtavinayak Cine Vision	₹63.92 crore (US$13.21 million)
10	All the Best: Fun Begins	Kinesis Films; Ajay Devgn Films	₹61 crore (US$12.6 million)

== 2009 releases ==
=== January–March ===
Opening		Title	Director	Cast	Genre	Studio
J A N	2	Mumbai Chakachak	Sanjay Jha	Rahul Bose, Ayesha Dharker, Mandira Bedi	Drama	
J A N	9	Horn 'Ok' Pleassss	Rakesh Sarang	Nana Patekar, Rimi Sen, Muzamil Ibrahim	Romantic comedy	
J A N	16	Chandni Chowk to China	Nikkhil Advani	Akshay Kumar, Deepika Padukone, KevJumba, Mithun Chakraborty, Ranvir Shorey	Action, comedy	Warner Bros. Pictures, Ramesh Sippy Entertainment, People Tree Films
J A N	23	Aasma: The Sky Is the Limit	Rohit Nayyar	Hrishitaa Bhatt, Seema Biswas, Nauheed Cyrusi, Mansi Dovhal, Ravi Gossain	Drama	
J A N	23	Raaz: The Mystery Continues	Mohit Suri	Emraan Hashmi, Kangana Ranaut, Adhyayan Suman, Jackie Shroff	Horror	Vishesh Films
J A N	30	Luck by Chance	Zoya Akhtar	Farhan Akhtar, Konkona Sen Sharma, Aamir Khan, Hrithik Roshan, Juhi Chawla, Rishi Kapoor, Sanjay Kapoor, Dimple Kapadia, Isha Sharvani, Shah Rukh Khan	Drama	BIG Pictures, Excel Entertainment
J A N	30	Victory	Ajit Pal Mangat	Harman Baweja, Amrita Rao, Anupam Kher, Gulshan Grover	Sports	
F E B	6	Dev.D	Anurag Kashyap	Abhay Deol, Mahi Gill, Kalki Koechlin	Romance	UTV Spotboy, Bindass
F E B	6	Chal Chala Chal	T. K. Rajeev Kumar	Govinda, Rajpal Yadav, Reemma Sen, Om Puri	Comedy	
F E B	6	Mere Khwabon Mein Jo Aaye	Madhureeta Anand	Randeep Hooda, Raima Sen, Arbaaz Khan, Neil Bhoopalam, Murli Sharma	Drama, fantasy, musical	
F E B	13	Billu	Priyadarshan	Irrfan Khan, Shah Rukh Khan, Lara Dutta, Om Puri, Rajpal Yadav, Asrani	Drama	Red Chillies Entertainment
F E B	13	The Stoneman Murders	Manish Gupta	Kay Kay Menon, Arbaaz Khan, Vikram Gokhale, Rukhsar Rehman	Crime, drama, mystery	
F E B	20	Delhi-6	Rakeysh Omprakash Mehra	Abhishek Bachchan, Sonam Kapoor, Amitabh Bachchan, Waheeda Rehman, Divya Dutta, Rishi Kapoor, Om Puri, Atul Kulkarni, Prem Chopra	Romance, drama	UTV Motion Pictures, Rakeysh Omprakash Mehra Pictures
F E B	27	Kisse Pyaar Karoon	Ajay Chandock	Arshad Warsi, Aashish Chaudhary, Aarti Chhabria, Yash Tonk, Udita Goswami	Romance	Sidhesh Films, K Sera Sera
M A R	6	13B	Vikram K. Kumar	R. Madhavan, Neetu Chandra, Saranya, Poonam Dhillon, Ravibabu, Sachin Khedekar, Deepak Dobriyal, Murli Sharma	Horror	BIG Pictures, Wide Angle Creations
M A R	6	Dhoondte Reh Jaaoge	Umesh Shukla	Kunal Khemu, Paresh Rawal, Soha Ali Khan, Sonu Sood, Asrani, Johnny Lever, Hrishita Bhatt, Deepal Shaw	Comedy	UTV Motion Pictures, Bindass
M A R	6	Karma Aur Holi	Manish Gupta	Sushmita Sen, Randeep Hooda, Naomi Campbell, Suresh Oberoi, Suchitra Krishnamoorthi, Deepal Shaw	Drama	Saregama Entertainment, Rapture Productions
M A R	13	Jai Veeru	Puneet Sira	Fardeen Khan, Kunal Khemu, Dia Mirza, Anjana Sukhani, Rajesh Khattar, Arbaaz Khan	Action comedy	
M A R	13	Little Zizou	Sooni Taraporevala	Boman Irani, John Abraham, Kurush Deboo	Comedy	Indian Films, Studio 18, Jigri Dost Productions
M A R	13	Gulaal	Anurag Kashyap	Kay Kay Menon, Deepak Dobriyal, Piyush Mishra, Mahi Gill, Jesse Randhawa, Aditya Shrivastava	Drama	Zee Limelight
M A R	20	Aloo Chaat	Robby Grewal	Aftab Shivdasani, Aamna Sharif, Linda Arsenio, Kulbhushan Kharbanda, Manoj Pahwa, Sanjay Mishra	Romantic comedy	PVR Pictures, Mirchi Movies, Maverick Productions, Red Ice Productions
M A R	20	Barah Aana	Raja Menon	Naseeruddin Shah, Tannishtha Chatterjee, Arjun Mathur, Vijay Raaz	Drama	Bandra West Pictures
M A R	20	Firaaq	Nandita Das	Deepti Naval, Naseeruddin Shah, Paresh Rawal, Raghubir Yadav, Sanjay Suri	Political	Percept Picture Company
M A R	20	Lottery	Hemant Prabhu	Abhijeet Sawant, Sanjay Narvekar, Mukesh Tiwari, Rucha Gujarati, Manisha Kelkar	Comedy	
M A R	20	Straight	Parvati Balagopalan	Daman Baggan, Anuj Chaudhary, Ketki Dave, Siddharth Makkar, Gul Panag, Vinay Pathak	Romantic comedy	Columbia Pictures, IDream Production
M A R	27	Aa Dekhen Zara	Jehangir Surti	Neil Mukesh, Bipasha Basu, Rahul Dev, Sophie Choudry	Action, thriller	Eros International
M A R	27	Ek: The Power of One	Sangeeth Sivan	Bobby Deol, Shriya Saran, Nana Patekar, Chunky Pandey, Pradeep, Kulbhushan Kharbanda, Jackie Shroff	Action thriller	

=== April–June ===
Opening		Title	Director	Cast	Genre	Studio
A P R	3	8 x 10 Tasveer	Nagesh Kukunoor	Akshay Kumar, Ayesha Takia, Rushad Rana, Sharmila Tagore, Javed Jaffrey	Thriller	Percept Picture Company, SIC Productions
A P R	10	Ek Se Bure Do	Tarique	Arshad Warsi, Anita Hassanandani, Rajpal Yadav, Govind Namdeo, Yashpal Sharma, Virendra Saxena, Vijay Raaz, Razzak Khan	Comedy	Filmsland Entertainment
A P R	10	Pal Pal Dil Ke Ssaat	V Krishna Kumar	Ajay Jadeja, Mahie Gill, Satish Shah, Sushma Seth, Vinod Kambli, Sylvie	Drama	
A P R	10	Coffee House	Gurbir Grewal	Ashutosh Rana, Sakshi Tanwar, Harsh Chhaya	Drama	
A P R	10	School Days	Dilip Sood	Pankaj Sharma, Rajiv Sethi, Virender Sharma, Shailly Sehgal		
A P R	10	Royal Utsav	Ravi K. Patwa	Vikram Kumar, Monalisa, Sudesh Berry, Master Abhishek Sharma, Tripta Chopra, Antra Vishwas, Charu Arora	Historical drama	
A P R	17	Chowrasta Crossroads of Love	Anjan Dutt	Victor Banerjee, Atul Kulkarni, Roopa Ganguly, Naved Aslam, Aparajita	Drama	
A P R	17	Meri Padosan	Prakash Saini	Sarwar Ahuja, Saadhika Randhawa, Hina Tasleem, Sneha Dhabi, Sanjay Mishra, Ashok Bagla, Khayali	Comedy	
A P R	22	Sikandar	Piyush Jha	Parzan Dastur, Ayesha Kapur, Rahul Singh, R. Madhavan, Sanjay Suri	Social	BIG Pictures
M A Y	15	99	Raj and D.K.	Kunal Khemu, Boman Irani, Soha Ali Khan, Cyrus Broacha, Mahesh Manjrekar, Vinod Khanna, Sudesh Berry, Simone Singh	Crime comedy	People Pictures
M A Y	15	Suno Na.. Ek Nanhi Aawaz	Amy Thanawala	Tara Sharma, Avinash Tiwary, Rajendra Chawla, Dharmendra Gohil, Rinku Patel	Drama	
M A Y	22	Detective Naani	Romilla Mukherjee	Ava Mukherjee, Zain Khan, Shweta Gulati, Amit Verma	Drama	
M A Y	29	Yeh Pal Ho Na Ho kal	Ravi Pun	Prakash Sagar, Rishabh, Tina Rana, Simran	Drama	
J U N	5	Sanam Teri Kasam	Lawrence D'Souza	Saif Ali Khan, Pooja Bhatt, Atul Agnihotri	Comedy, romance	
J U N	5	Team - The Force	Ajay Chandhok	Sohail Khan, Amrita Arora, Yash Tonk	Action	
J U N	12	Kal Kissne Dekha	Vivek Sharma	Jackky Bhagnani, Vaishali Desai, Rishi Kapoor, Juhi Chawla, Riteish Deshmukh, Sanjay Dutt, Dalip Tahil	Romance, drama, social, comedy	BIG Pictures, Pooja Entertainment
J U N	12	Zor Lagaa Ke...Haiya!	Girish Girija Joshi	Mithun Chakraborty, Mahesh Manjrekar, Sachin Khedekar, Raj Zutshi, Ashwin Chitale, Gulshan Grover	Children's	
J U N	19	Let's Dance	Aarif Sheikh	Ajay Chaudhary, Gayatri Patel, Sugandha Garg, Paras Arora	Romance	
J U N	19	Paying Guests	Paritossh Painter	Shreyas Talpade, Sayali Bhagat, Javed Jaffrey, Aashish Chaudhary, Chunky Pandey, Vatsal Sheth, Johnny Lever, Celina Jaitly, Riya Sen, Neha Dhupia	Comedy	Mukta Arts
J U N	26	New York	Kabir Khan	John Abraham, Katrina Kaif, Neil Mukesh, Irrfan Khan	Action thriller, romance	Yash Raj Films

=== July–September ===
Opening		Title	Director	Cast	Genre	Studio
J U L	3	Kambakkht Ishq	Sabbir Khan	Akshay Kumar, Kareena Kapoor, Brandon Routh, Vindu Dara Singh, Aftab Shivdasani, Amrita Arora, Sylvester Stallone, Javed Jaffrey, Kirron Kher, Boman Irani	Action, comedy, romance	Eros International, Nadiadwala Grandson Entertainment
J U L	10	Sankat City	Pankaj Advani	Kurush Deboo, Manoj Pahwa, Kay Kay Menon, Anupam Kher, Rimi Sen, Chunky Pandey, Mia Uyeda, Rahul Dev	Dark comedy	Moser Baer Entertainment
J U L	10	Shortkut	Neeraj Vora	Akshaye Khanna, Arshad Warsi, Amrita Rao, Sanjay Dutt, Anil Kapoor, Siddharth Randeria	Comedy	Indian Films, Anil Kapoor Films Company
J U L	17	Jashnn	Raksha Mistry & Hasnain S Hyderabadwala	Adhyayan Suman, Anjana Sukhani, Sumeet Vyas, Shahana Goswami, Humayun Saeed	Musical	Vishesh Films
J U L	24	Luck	Soham Shah	Sanjay Dutt, Shruti Haasan, Imran Khan, Mithun Chakraborty, Danny Denzongpa, Ravi Kishan, Rati Agnihotri	Action thriller	Shree Ashtavinayak Cine Vision, Indian Films
J U L	31	Love Aaj Kal	Imtiaz Ali	Kavi Shastri, Giselle Monteiro, Saif Ali Khan, Deepika Padukone, Vir Das, Rishi Kapoor, Rahul Khanna, Raj Zutshi, Dolly Ahluwalia, Neetu Singh	Romance, comedy, drama	Eros International, Illuminati Films
A U G	7	Agyaat	Ram Gopal Varma	Gautam Rode, Nitin Kumar Reddy, Priyanka Kothari	Horror	UTV Motion Pictures, Deamforce Enterprise
A U G	7	Chal Chalein	Ujjwal Singh	Mithun Chakraborty, Rati Agnihotri, Shilpa Shukla, Mukesh Khanna	Social	
A U G	7	Teree Sang	Satish Kaushik	Ruslaan Mumtaz, Sheena Shahabadi, Neena Gupta	Drama	Columbia Pictures, Mega Bollywood, Karol Bagh Film & Entertainment
A U G	14	Kaminey	Vishal Bhardwaj	Shahid Kapoor, Priyanka Chopra, Amole Gupte, Chandan Roy Sanyal, Deb Mukherjee	Action	UTV Motion Pictures
A U G	14	Life Partner	Rumi Jaffrey	Govinda, Fardeen Khan, Tusshar Kapoor, Genelia D'Souza, Prachi Desai, Amrita Rao, Anupam Kher	Comedy, romance	Indian Films, Studio 18, Burmawala Bros
A U G	21	Three: Love, Lies, Betrayal	Vishal Pandya	Aashish Chaudhary, Akshay Kapoor Nausheen Ali Sardar	Thriller	
A U G	28	Daddy Cool	K. Murli Manohar Rao	Suniel Shetty, Aftab Shivdasani, Aarti Chabria, Aashish Chaudhary, Javed Jaffrey, Rajpal Yadav, Sophie Chaudhry, Tulip Joshi, Chunky Pandey, Prem Chopra, Kim Sharma	Comedy	BIG Pictures, Maruti Pictures
A U G	28	Kisaan	Puneet Sira	Jackie Shroff, Sohail Khan, Arbaaz Khan, Diya Mirza, Nauheed Cyrusi	Social	UTV Spotboy, Sohail Khan Production
A U G	28	Love Khichdi	Srinivas Bhashyam	Randeep Hooda, Rituparna Sengupta, Milind Soman, Divya Dutta	Comedy	
A U G	28	Toss	Ramesh Khatkar	Prashant Raj Sachdev, Ashmit Patel, Rannvijay Singh	Thriller	
A U G	28	Yeh Mera India	N. Chandra	Anupam Kher, Perizaad Zorabian, Ashwin Mushran, Purab Kohli, Rajpal Yadav, Sarika, Parvin Dabas, Seema Biswas, Vijay Raaz, Smilie Suri	Social	Pen Studios
A U G	28	Quick Gun Murugun	Shashanka Ghosh	Rajendra Prasad, Nassar, Rambha, Anuradha Menon, Raju Sundaram, Shanmugarajan, Vinay Pathak, Ashwin Mushran	Comedy Western	Fox Star Studios, Phat Phish Motion Pictures
S E P	4	Aagey Se Right	Indrajit Nattoji	Shreyas Talpade, Shiv Panditt, Mahi Gill, Kay Kay Menon, Shruti Seth, Shenaz Treasurywala	Comedy	UTV Spotboy, Bindass
S E P	4	Chintu Ji	Ranjit Kapoor	Rishi Kapoor, Priyanshu Chatterjee, Kulraj Randhawa	Comedy	
S E P	4	Fox	Deepak Tijori	Arjun Rampal, Sagarika Ghatge, Udita Goswami, Sunny Deol, Kurush Deboo, Vipul Gupta	Drama	
S E P	11	Aamras	Rupali Guha	Jiya Sarang, Pari Sehgal, Rakhi Chadda, Sanya Balsara, Zarina Wahab, Reema, Sukanya Kulkarni, Shubhi, Vikram Kapadia, Usha Bachani, Sonali Sachdev, Meher, Sunil Sinha, Manoj Pahwa	Drama	
S E P	11	Baabarr	Ashu Trikha	Soham Deepak, Mithun Chakraborty, Urvashi Sharma	Action	
S E P	11	Vaada Raha	Samir Karnik	Bobby Deol, Kangana Ranaut, Mohnish Bahl, Sharat Saxena, Dwij Yadav, Atul Agnihotri	Romance	Next Gen Films, Top Angle Productions
S E P	18	Dil Bole Hadippa!	Anurag Singh	Rani Mukherjee, Shahid Kapoor, Anupam Kher, Dalip Tahil, Rakhi Sawant, Sherlyn Chopra	Romantic comedy, sports	Yash Raj Films
S E P	18	Wanted	Prabhu Deva	Salman Khan, Ayesha Takia, Anil Kapoor, Prakash Raj, Vinod Khanna, Mahesh Manjrekar, Inder Kumar, Govinda	Action, romance	Sahara One Motion Pictures, Eros International, BSK Network & Entertainment
S E P	18	Blue Oranges	Rajesh Ganguly	Rajat Kapoor, Shishir Sharma, Aham Sharma, Puja Kanwal, Rati Agnihotri, Harsh Chhaya	Thriller	
S E P	22	Phir Kabhi	V. K. Prakash	Mithun Chakraborty, Dimple Kapadia, Rati Agnihotri, Gulshan Grover,	Romance, drama	UTV Motion Pictures, The Culture Company
S E P	25	What's Your Raashee?	Ashutosh Gowarikar	Harman Baweja, Priyanka Chopra	Romantic comedy	UTV Motion Pictures, Ashutosh Gowarikar Productions

=== October–December ===
Opening		Title	Director	Cast	Genre	Studio
O C T	2	Do Knot Disturb	David Dhawan	Govinda, Riteish Deshmukh, Lara Dutta, Sushmita Sen, Sohail Khan, Ranvir Shorey, Rajpal Yadav	Comedy, romance	BIG Pictures, Pooja Entertainment
O C T	2	Wake Up Sid	Ayan Mukerji	Ranbir Kapoor, Konkona Sen Sharma, Rahul Khanna, Namit Das, Anupam Kher	Romantic comedy	UTV Motion Pictures, Dharma Productions
O C T	9	Acid Factory	Suparn Verma	Dia Mirza, Fardeen Khan, Irrfan Khan, Manoj Bajpai, Dino Morea, Aftab Shivdasani, Danny Denzongpa, Gulshan Grover	Action	White Feather Films
O C T	16	All the Best: Fun Begins	Rohit Shetty	Sanjay Dutt, Ajay Devgn, Fardeen Khan, Bipasha Basu, Mugdha Godse, Johnny Lever	Comedy	Kinesis Films, Ajay Devgn FFilms
O C T	16	Blue	Anthony D'souza	Akshay Kumar, Sanjay Dutt, Lara Dutta, Zayed Khan, Katrina Kaif, Rahul Dev	Action	Shree Ashtavinayak Cine Vision
O C T	16	Main Aurr Mrs Khanna	Prem Soni	Salman Khan, Kareena Kapoor, Sohail Khan, Deepika Padukone, Dino Morea, Preity Zinta, Nauheed Cyrusi, Yash Tonk, Bappi Lahiri	Drama, romance	UTV Motion Pictures, Sohail Khan Production
O C T	23	Bal Ganesh 2	Pankaj Sharma		Animation	Shemaroo Entertainment, Astute Pankaj Productions
O C T	23	Fruit and Nut	Kunal Vijaykar	Boman Irani, Cyrus Broacha, Mahesh Manjrekar, Dia Mirza	Comedy	Indian Films, Studio 18
O C T	23	Love Ka Tadka	Rajan Wagdhare	Nauheed Cyrusi, Sameer Dattani	Romantic comedy	
O C T	30	London Dreams	Vipul Shah	Salman Khan, Ajay Devgn, Asin Thottumkal, Rannvijay Singh, Aditya Roy Kapur, Om Puri	Musical, social, drama, romance	Eros International, Blockbuster Movie Entertainers, Headstart Films, Intech
O C T	30	Aladin	Sujoy Ghosh	Amitabh Bachchan, Sanjay Dutt, Jacqueline Fernandez, Riteish Deshmukh, Sahil Khan, Ratna Pathak Shah	Fantasy	Eros International, Boundscript
N O V	6	Ajab Prem Ki Ghazab Kahani	Rajkumar Santoshi	Ranbir Kapoor, Katrina Kaif, Pradeep Kharab, Zakir Hussain, Upen Patel, Darshan Jariwala	Comedy, romance	Tips Industries
N O V	6	Jail	Madhur Bhandarkar	Neil Nitin Mukesh, Mugdha Godse, Manoj Bajpayee, Kaveri Jha, Sayali Bhagat, Rahul Singh, Atul Kulkarni, Navni Parihar	Social	Percept Picture Company, Bhandarkar Entertainment
N O V	13	Tum Mile	Kunal Deshmukh	Emraan Hashmi, Soha Ali Khan, Rituraj Singh, Sachin Khedekar	Romance	PVR Pictures, Sony Music, Vishesh Films
N O V	13	Aao Wish Karein	Glenn Baretto	Aftab Shivdasani, Aamna Shariff, Shah Rukh Khan, Johnny Lever, Ritesh Deshmukh	Fantasy	
N O V	20	Kurbaan	Rensil D'Silva	Saif Ali Khan, Kareena Kapoor, Rupinder Nagra, Vivek Oberoi, Dia Mirza, Om Puri, Kirron Kher, Nauheed Cyrusi	Thriller, romance	UTV Motion Pictures, Dharma Productions
N O V	20	Shaabash! You Can Do It	Shankar Mondal	Hitesh Agrawal, Mansi Dovhal, Sudesh Berry, Nasir Khan	Comedy, thriller, social	
N O V	20	Marega Salaa	Devang Dholkia	Jimmy Sheirgill, Kim Sharma, Hrishita Bhatt, Rahul Handa	Action	
N O V	27	De Dana Dan	Priyadarshan	Akshay Kumar, Manoj Joshi, Katrina Kaif, Tinnu Anand, Johnny Lever, Sunil Shetty, Paresh Rawal, Neha Dhupia, Sameera Reddy, Aditi Govitrikar, Rajpal Yadav, Supriya Karnik, Shakti Kapoor, Vikram Gokhale, Asrani, Chunky Pandey, Archana Puran Singh	Comedy	Baba Arts, Hari Om Entertainment, Eros International, Venus Records & Tapes
D E C	3	Radio	Ishaan Trivedi	Himesh Reshammiya, Shenaz Treasurywala, Sonal Sehgal	Musical	
D E C	4	Paa	R. Balki	Amitabh Bachchan, Abhishek Bachchan, Vidya Balan, Paresh Rawal	Drama, family	Reliance Big Pictures, Amitabh Bachchan Corporation, MAD Entertainment
D E C	11	Rocket Singh: Salesman of the Year	Shimit Amin	Ranbir Kapoor, Gauahar Khan, Shazahn Padamsee, Prem Chopra	Comedy	Yash Raj Films
D E C	18	Raat Gayi, Baat Gayi?	Saurabh Shukla	Rajat Kapoor, Vinay Pathak, Neha Dhupia, Navneet Nishan, Dalip Tahil, Anuradha Menon, Aamir Bashir, Iravati Harshe	Drama	Percept Picture Company, Pritish Nandy Communications
D E C	25	3 Idiots	Rajkumar Hirani	Aamir Khan, Kareena Kapoor, Sharman Joshi, R. Madhavan, Boman Irani, Omi Vaidya, Mona Singh, Ali Fazal	Comedy	Reliance Big Pictures, Vinod Chopra Films
D E C	31	Accident on Hill Road	Mahesh Nair	Celina Jaitly, Farooq Sheikh	Thriller	

== See also ==
- List of Hindi films of 2010
- List of Hindi films of 2008
