= Raghu Ram =

Indian television producer and actor (born 1973)

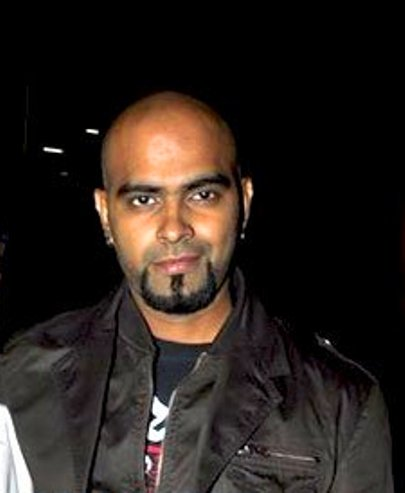
- Raghu in 2011
- Born: Raghu Ram Ambadapudi; 15 April 1973 (age 53); Machilipatnam, Andhra Pradesh, India
- Occupations: Television producer; Television presenter; Actor
- Years active: 2000–present
- Spouses: Sugandha Garg (m. 2006; div. 2018) Natalie Di Luccio (m. 2018)
- Relatives: Rajiv Lakshman (brother)

Raghu Ram Ambadapudi (born 15 April 1973) is an Indian actor and television presenter who predominantly works in Hindi and Telugu television shows, and films. He began his career as the creator of Hindi reality shows MTV Roadies (2003–2014) and MTV Splitsvilla (2008–2009). Ram later also hosted various television shows.

He made his film debut with the Hindi romantic comedy Jhootha Hi Sahi (2010) and got breakthrough with the Tamil action comedy Doctor (2021). He made his Telugu debut with the crime comedy Keedaa Cola (2023).

== Early life and education ==
Raghu Ram was born into a Telugu family in New Delhi, along with his twin brother, Rajiv Lakshman.

Ram attended Deshbandhu College and Sri Venkateswara College, finally earning his degree at Osmania University in Hyderabad.

== Career ==
=== Early career ===
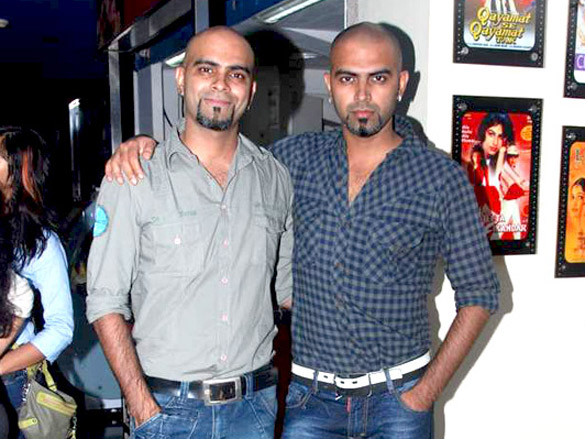
Raghu Ram (left) with his brother Rajiv Lakshman

Raghu Ram started his career at MTV India supervising shows including MTV Love Line with VJs Malaika Arora and Cyrus Broacha, and also spearheaded MTV Select and the first few seasons of MTV Super Select with VJ Nikhil Chinapa.

In 2004, Ram appeared in the first season of the reality TV show Indian Idol as a contestant with judges Anu Malik, Farah Khan and Sonu Nigam. He was rejected due to inefficient singing ability and signature attitude traits. He later explained in his autobiography that picking a fight with the judges was actually a prank he played, on the suggestion of one of his colleagues and his wife who were working there as moderators.

=== MTV India ===
Raghu Ram created MTV Roadies, which launched in 2003. The series gained popularity and went on to become one of India's longest-running reality television programmes.

Raghu became widely known for his appearances during the show's auditions. His brother, Rajiv Lakshman, later joined the show as a judge in 2008.

Raghu served as the senior supervising producer at MTV India and as executive producer of MTV Roadies and MTV Splitsvilla, which he launched in 2008.

In 2014, he left Roadies after an 11-year association with the series.

Raghu wrote an autobiography titled Rearview: My Roadies Journey, published by Rupa Publications India in 2013.

=== Post-Roadies ===
In April 2016, Ram launched a web series titled A.I.SHA My Virtual Girlfriend, a webcam fiction show, through the online content platform Arre. Ram along with his brother have performed in the comedy series Comedy Nights Bachao on Colors TV. Raghu Ram has also performed in the comedy serial Entertainment Ki Raat.

In 2019, Raghu and his brother Rajiv Lakshman hosted and produced the Amazon Prime Video reality series Skulls & Roses. He later created and directed the Netflix reality series IRL: In Real Love, released in 2023.

=== Film career ===
Raghu and his brother Rajiv Lakshman appeared in the Hindi film Tees Maar Khan (2010) as the Johri brothers. In the same year, Raghu also appeared in Jhootha Hi Sahi alongside John Abraham.

In later years, Raghu expanded his acting career into South Indian cinema. He made his Tamil film debut alongside Rajiv in Nelson Dilipkumar's Doctor (2021), playing one of the film's antagonists. He subsequently appeared in the Telugu films Keedaa Cola (2023) and Mechanic Rocky (2024).

In 2025, he appeared as an antagonist in the Tamil film Good Bad Ugly, starring Ajith Kumar, and in the Telugu fantasy film Mirai.

== Filmography ==
=== Film ===
| Year | Title | Role | Language |
|---|---|---|---|
| 2010 | Jhootha Hi Sahi | Omar | Hindi |
| 2010 | Tees Maar Khan | Johri Bro. | Hindi |
| 2013 | Love You Soniye | Mahendra Singh Gill | Punjabi |
| 2016 | Varthak Nagar | Kunwar Singh | Punjabi |
| 2021 | Doctor | Melvin | Tamil |
| 2023 | Keedaa Cola | Shots | Telugu |
| 2024 | Gandhi Tatha Chettu | | Telugu |
| 2024 | Mechanic Rocky | Chanti / R. Kranthi | Telugu |
| 2025 | Good Bad Ugly | Zakaba | Tamil |
| 2025 | Mirai | Dasu Daddy | Telugu |

=== Television ===
| Year | Title | Role | Network | Language | Notes |
|---|---|---|---|---|---|
| 2003–2014; 2026-present | MTV Roadies | Self | MTV | Hindi | Also creator |
| 2008–2009 | MTV Splitsvilla | Self | MTV | Hindi | Also co-creator |
| 2017 | MTV Dropout Pvt Ltd | Mentor | MTV | Hindi | Also co-creator |
| 2018 | India's Best Judwaah | Judge | Zee | Hindi | Also co-creator |
| 2018 | Entertainment Ki Raat | Self | Colors | Hindi | |
| 2015 | All India Bakchod Knockout | Himself | YouTube | Hindi | |
| 2016–2019 | A.I.SHA My Virtual Girlfriend | Siddharth Babar | Arre | Hindi | |
| 2016 | Soadies | Raghu Ram | JioCinemas | Hindi | |
| 2017 | TVF InMates | Raghu Ram | TVF | Hindi | |
| 2019 | Skulls & Roses | Host | Amazon Prime | Hindi | Also co-creator |
| 2023 | IRL In Real Love | | Netflix | Hindi | Creator and Director |
| 2024 | Jamnapaar | Rajat Thapar | Amazon miniTV | Hindi | |
| 2024-2026 | India's Got Latent | Guest judge | YouTube, Netflix | Hindi | |

== Personal life ==
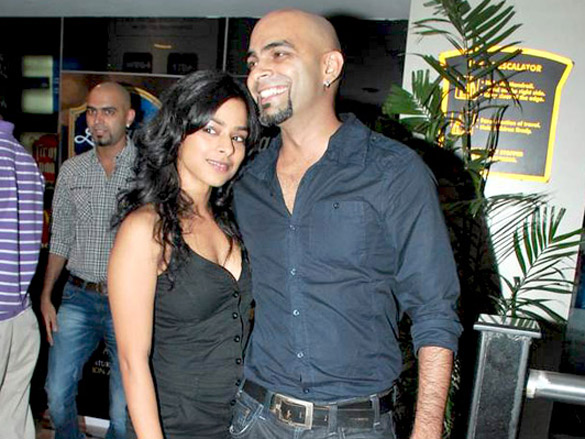
Sugandha Garg and Raghu Ram in 2012

Raghu Ram was married to actress Sugandha Garg. In 2016, they announced their separation, after having been married for almost a decade. Their divorce was finalised in 2018.

In 2018, he married singer Natalie Di Luccio. On 8 January 2020, they had a son.

== Publications ==
Ram's autobiography Rearview: My Roadies Journey was published by Rupa Publications in 2013.

== Bibliography ==
- Ram, Raghu (20 November 2013). Rearview: My Roadies Journey. Rupa Publications India Pvt. Ltd. p. 313. ISBN 978-81-291-3240-6.
