= Shagun =

- Written by: Brij Mohan, Pawan K Sethhi, Ranbir Pushp
- Directed by: Kaushik Ghatak, Santosh Bhatt Vijay Saraiya, Vijay Chaturvedi, Sunil Prasad Sangeeta Rao & Amitabh Sinha
- Starring: see below
- Opening theme: "Shagun" 2 and 3 by Pamela Jain
- Country of origin: India
- No. of episodes: Total 688

Production
- Producer: Zarina Mehta
- Running time: approx. 26 minutes
- Production company: UTV Software Communications

Original release
- Network: Star Plus
- Release: 15 January 2001 – 29 April 2004

Shagun is an Indian Hindi-language television series that aired every Monday to Thursdays 2:30pm and later at 2pm on Star Plus from 15 January 2001 to 29 April 2004. It is the story of fortune's twists and pitfalls that tear asunder the lives of two cousins tied together by a bond stronger than that of blood : the bond of love.

== Overview ==
Shagun is the story of two cousins, Aradhana and Aarti, brought up together and so close to each other that one hardly needs words to convey her thoughts to the other. Aarti is an optimist – she believes that she has what it takes to touch the stars, if she desires. Aradhana, however, considers herself unlucky.

== Cast ==
- Surbhi Tiwari as Aradhana
- Kabir Sadanand as Karan
- Rekha Rao as Rajrani
- Surendra Pal as Kailashnath
- Prashant Narayanan as Sumer
- Rupal Patel as Lakhi
- Shweta Agarwal / Vandita Vasa / Pooja Ghai Rawal as Aarti
- Jiten Lalwani as Suraj
- Suhita Thatte as Aunt of Aradhana and Aarti, Sister of Kailashnath
- Renu Pandey as Gayatri
- Dimple Inamdar as Piya
- Tejal Shah as Poonam
- Shweta Gulati as Juhi
- Amit Varma as Dev
- Kapil Soni as Uday
- Sachin Shroff as Prashant
- Vishal Watwani as Anjali's Brother
- Akshay Anand as Akash
- Sanjay Mitra
- Sonia Kapoor as Anjali
- Kiran Bhargava
- Sunita Rajwar
- Suhasini Mulay as Akash's mother
- Shagufta Ali as Riftabi
- Naresh Suri
- Aparna Bhatnagar

== Reception ==
Despite aired in an afternoon slot, it became the top rated afternoon soap. In the week ending 28 May 2001, it garnered 3.4 TVR, occupying its position in top 20 Hindi GEC. In the week ending 12 July 2003, it garnered 3.6 TVR.
