= Morai =

Morai may refer to:

- Heiau, a Hawaiian temple.
- Marae, a communal or sacred place that serves religious and social purposes in Polynesian societies.
- Mirai (disambiguation), the Japanese word for the future and multiple other uses
- Moirai, the incarnations of destiny in Ancient Greek religion and mythology
- Rashid Morai (1944–2014), a Pakistan poet and activist.
