= Indian National Trust for Art and Cultural Heritage =

Non-governmental organization in India

- Abbreviation: INTACH
- Formation: 27 January 1984; 42 years ago
- Type: NGO
- Purpose: Art, Cultural and Heritage Preservation/Restoration
- Headquarters: 71, Lodhi Estate, New Delhi - 110003
- Website: www.intach.org

The Indian National Trust for Art and Cultural Heritage (INTACH) is a non-profit charitable organisation registered under the Societies Registration Act, 1860.

In 2007, the United Nations awarded INTACH a special consultative status with the United Nations Economic and Social Council.

== History ==
The Indian National Trust for Art and Cultural Heritage (INTACH) was founded in 1984, in New Delhi, with the vision to create a membership organisation to stimulate and spearhead heritage awareness and conservation in India.

Since 1984, INTACH has pioneered the conservation and protection of India's natural and cultural heritage and is today the largest membership organisation in the country dedicated to conservation.

Today it has chapters in 215 Indian cities, as well as a chapter in Belgium.

The Memorandum of Association and Rules and Regulations of INTACH constituted the first Governing Council of the Trust with the following members: Rajiv Gandhi, Pupul Jayakar, L. K. Jha, M. G. K. Menon, Kapila Vatsyayan, Rajeev Sethi, B. K. Thapar, Martand Singh, Bilkees I. Latif, Madhavrao Scindia, and J. B. Dadachanji.

In 2007, INTACH signed a memorandum of understanding with AusHeritage, Australia's noted heritage network, to collaborate on South Asian and South East Asian regional initiatives. In 2008 it partnered up with the International Cultural Centre, a governmental institution based in Kraków, Poland.

== Work ==
Among the tasks undertaken by INTACH are restoration of monuments and their management; advocacy for heritage property conservation; public awareness through heritage walks and buses; establishment of heritage clubs in schools; and holding of awareness workshop for teachers of schools and colleges and heritage walks to various unprotected sites.

=== Activism ===
INTACH has been involved in several protests against destruction and proposed to stop demolition of heritage structures, including Errum Manzil and Osmania Hospital in Hyderabad, and Janata Bazaar in Bengaluru.

=== Restoration ===
Over the years, INTACH has taken up restoration and protection of hundreds of monuments that fall outside the coverage of Archaeological Survey of India and other government agencies, and at times local authorities hand over the upkeep and restoration of heritage structures to INTACH directly.

After developing Raghurajpur, Odisha, India, a place famous for its master 'Pattachitra' artists and 'Gotipua' dance troupes as a heritage village, which has now become a major rural tourist destination, it later used the same pattern to develop Padmanabhpur village, Ganjam district, Odisha, India, famous for its weavers and folk dancers, into another heritage destination.

In 2007, the government of Goa signed a memorandum of understanding (MoU) with INTACH for restoration, conservation and maintenance of 51 officially listed heritage and cultural monuments in the state. This includes the restoration and conservation of the 16th century Reis Magos Fort in Goa, then in 2008 INTACH signed another memorandum of understanding with the Government of Delhi for the conservation of 92 monuments in Delhi, in the preparations for the Commonwealth Games 2010.

== Logo ==
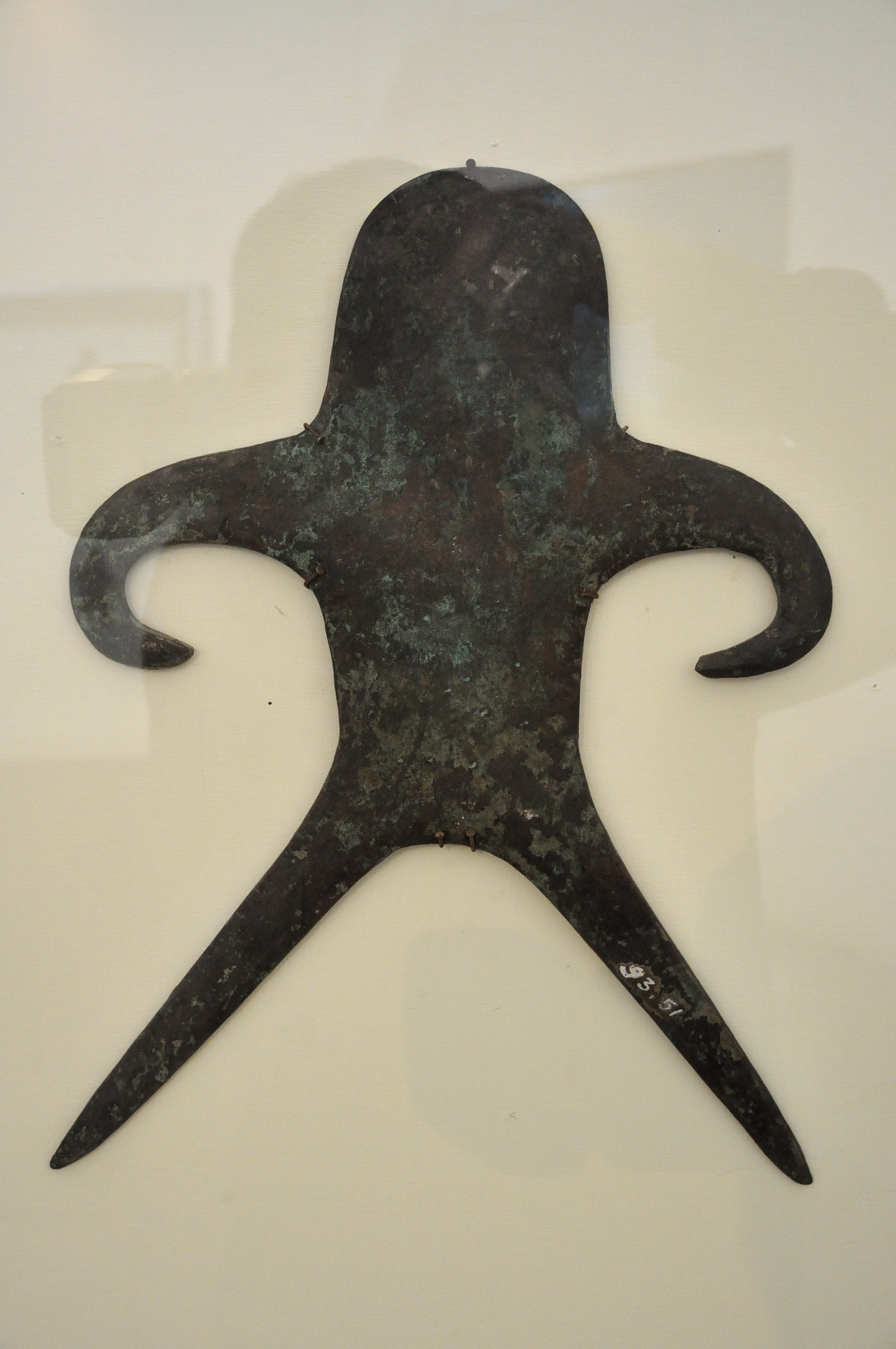
The INTACH logo has been derived from this 3000-year-old anthropomorphic copper figure (ACCN 93-51) found at Shahabad, UP, now at Government Museum, Mathura.

The INTACH Logo, based on the anthropomorphic copper figure from Shahabad, Uttar Pradesh, belonging to the enigmatic Copper Hoards of the Ganga Valley (circa 1800—1700 BC) is the perceived brand image of INTACH. The classic simplicity and vitality of its lines make it an example of primitive man's creative genius.

== Mission ==
INTACH's mission to conserve heritage is based on the belief that living in harmony with heritage enhances the quality of life, and it is the duty of every citizen of India as laid down in the Constitution of India. The objectives spelt out in the Memorandum of Association constitute INTACH's Mandate and Vision. Its stated mission to date continues to be:

- Sensitise the public about the pluralistic cultural legacy of India
- Instill a sense of social responsibility towards preserving India's common heritage
- Protect and preserve India's living, built, and natural heritage by undertaking necessary actions and measures
- Document unprotected buildings of archaeological, architectural, historic and aesthetic significance, as well as the cultural resources, as this is the first step towards formulating conservation plans
- Develop heritage policies and regulations, and make legal interventions to protect India's heritage when necessary
- Provide expertise in the field of conservation, restoration and preservation of specific works of art; and encourage capacity-building by developing skills through training programmes
- Undertake emergency response measures during natural or man-made disasters and support the local administration whenever heritage is threatened
- Foster collaborations, Memoranda of Understanding (MoU) and partnerships with government and other national and international agencies
- Generate sponsorships for conservation and educational projects

To achieve the above-stated mission, at subsequent Visioning Exercises further measures were spelt out:

- INTACH must widen and strengthen its base so as to involve people in caring for our common heritage, as outlined in the objectives of the Memorandum of Association of the Society
- INTACH should develop into a highly competent and efficient organization of first recourse in all matters concerning Built (Architectural), Natural, Art (Material), Intangible (Living) Heritage in the country by building the requisite professional and other skills, both at its Central Office and at the Chapter level
- INTACH should strive to become the primary advisor on all matters pertaining to protection, conservation and preservation of heritage for the central government, the state governments (including institutions, agencies and organizations under them, such as the Armed Forces), and for institutions of decentralised governance such as the Panchayati Raj Institutions in the rural areas, for the urban local bodies (municipalities, metropolitan authorities, cantonment boards, etc.), and also the Corporate and Public Sectors
- INTACH should put into place an effective system of networking with other like-minded organizations and build a mutual support system

== Awards ==
INTACH bestows the following awards:

- The Anirudh Bhargava – INTACH Environmental Award has been instituted in the memory of his son by Dr. Ranjit Bhargava, INTACH Life Member and facilitated by a grant.
- INTACH Award for Best Practices in Heritage Conservation
- The INTACH-STATE Heritage Tourism Award recognizes "inspiring and innovative work done by individuals/organization/ institutions" in a number of areas including "reuse of heritage concepts and properties for tourism purposes".

== Funding ==
INTACH has established chapters not only within India but also outside it. It now uses funds raised by its international chapter in Belgium to take up restoration, conservation and protection projects of historical structures and heritage buildings across India.

== Collaborations ==
In recent years, INTACH has received support from the central government and several state governments, corporate houses and international agencies.
