= Shweta Gulati =

Indian television actress

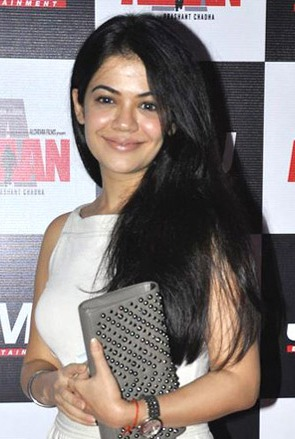
- Shweta Gulati at the premiere of Azaan
- Occupation: Actress
- Years active: 2003–2023

Shweta Gulati is an Indian television actress best known for playing the role of Tiya Ahuja in Remix and Dr. Nikita Malhotra in Dill Mill Gayye.

== Career ==
Her first advertisement was directed by Prahlad Kakkar. Later more commercial ads came her way. Her television career began when she was cast in the role of Juhi in the Star Plus show Shagun.

As a television actress Gulati has played a variety of contrasting roles ranging from a girl who lost her parents and was ill-treated by her aunts in Kyun Hota Hai Pyarrr to a spoilt fashionable, rich girl with a golden heart Tiya Ahuja in Remix and her negative role of Sonia in Amber Dhara. In 2008, she joined Dill Mill Gayye as a new medical intern.

Post Shagun she went on to play a tomboy Tara in the youth show Kyun Hota Hai Pyarrr. She had her first anchoring experience when she hosted the show Pardey Ke Peechey again on Star Plus which looked into the personal lives of the television stars. She also portrayed a grey shaded character in Rose Audio Visuals's Lipstick on Zee TV. She went on to a lead role in Remix, which debuted on 1 November 2004 on Star One. It was one of the first shows to be launched on the then newly launched channel. She was the first one to be cast and was finalised to play one of the leads in the show. She was cast as Tiya Ahuja though she was offered a chance to play the other lead Anvesha instead. She took voice modulation training to change her voice to suit Tia's personality. She received positive critical reviews for her portrayal of the 16-year-old girl in Remix Her work with the then debutant actor Karan Wahi who played Ranveer Sisodia in the show was also very well received.

Post Remix she took up cameo roles in various shows such as Aek Chahbi...Hai Padoss Mein , Mann Mein Hain Vishwas and Durgesh Nandinii. She took up a negative role in the Sony Entertainment Television's show Amber Dhara. Her next project was a sitcom about the battle of sexes called Kiss Kiss Bang Bang, which aired on the channel Bindass, in which she played the role of Riya, the business director at an advertising agency who had no time for men or love. Her clash and interaction with her colleague Rohan played by Akshay Dogra formed the crux of the show. It showcased the battle between a feminist and a chauvinist.

She also anchored Zara Nachke Dikha, a reality dance show, alongside Karan Singh Grover with whom she again worked with when she entered the medical based drama Dill Mill Gayye as an intern Dr. Nikita Malhotra. Nikita was Dr. Armaan Malik played by Karan Singh Grover's college friend who falls in love with the senior doctor in the hospital Dr. Abhimanyu Modi played by Amit Tandon. In 2009 she hosted Dekh India Dekh, the sixth season of Comedy Circus, on Sony Entertainment Television. She has also hosted the Red Carpet of the Gold Awards of 2010. Her latest stint is as an angel Sandhya Shastri in the kids' show Gili Gili Gappa on Sab TV.

Gulati has also acted in theatre roles. Her first theatre appearance was as the title role in her play KKK...Kiran where she enacted the role of a mannequin who springs to life. Her theatre experience also includes the play Aastha where she again played the title role. She is currently working on her new play called Wife Time Trouble along with her Remix costars Ashiesh Roy and Karan Mehra.

In 2009 she appeared in a film, playing the character of Neeti Tipnis in Romilla Mukherjee's comedy film Detective Naani, acting alongside Ava Mukherjee, Ankur Nayyar and Amit Verma. She also played suhaani in Jo Biwi Se Kare Pyaar on SAB TV. Her last appearance was in 2017's Sab TV serial Partners Trouble Ho Gayi Double as Dolly.

Returning after two years, Gulati portrayed Janvi Rajeev Bansal in SAB TV's Tera Yaar Hoon Main that premiered on 31 August 2020. But her character dies after meeting with an accident, and thus Gulati exits the show. Her character is replaced by Daljeet Bagga, played by Sayantani Ghosh.

== Filmography ==
Year	Film	Role	Notes	Ref.
2009	Detective Naani	Neeti Tipnis		
2015	Vartak Nagar	Mona/ Lal Pari		
2015	The Magic of Giving	Auto driver's wife	Short film	
2021	PEP Talks	Social media addict	Short film	

=== Television ===
Year	Serial	Role	Notes	Ref.
2003	Shagun	Juhi		
2003	Kyun Hota Hai Pyarrr	Tara		
2003	Pardey Ke Peeche	Host		
2004	Lipstick	Khushi		
2005	Remix	Tia Ahuja		
2006	Weekend Popkorn	Host		
2006	Pyaar Ke Do Naam: Ek Raadha, Ek Shyaam	Tanya	Cameo appearance	
2007	Ishq Ki Ghanti	Rani	Cameo appearance	
2007	Man Mein Hai Visshwas	Mariyum	Episodic appearance	
2007	Durgesh Nandinii	Priyanka	Cameo appearance	
2007	Jigar Ma Badi Aag Hai	Pushpa "Push"		
2008	Aek Chabhi Hai Padoss Mein	Moulie		
2008	Kiss Kiss Bang Bang	Rhea		
2008	Comedy Circus - Chinchpokli To China	Contestant		
2008	Amber Dhara	Sonia Jaiswal		
2008	Panaah	Shona		
2008	Zara Nachke Dikha	Host		
2008	Dill Mill Gayye	Dr. Nikita (Nikki) Malhotra		
2009	Dekh India Dekh	Host		
2010	Crime Patrol	Meera (episodic)		
2010	Comedy Circus Ke Superstars	Herself	Teen Ka Tadka Special with Kapil Sharma	
2010	Gili Gili Gappa	Sandhya Shastri		
2013	Jo Biwi Se Kare Pyaar	Suhaani Khanna		
2014	Tu Mere Agal Bagal Hai	Kesari		
2017-2018	Partners Trouble Ho Gayi Double	Dolly		
2020–2021	Tera Yaar Hoon Main	Janvi Rajeev Bansal		
2021	Shaadi Mubarak	Shikha Vishal Agarwal	Cameo	
2022–2023	Main Hoon Aparajita	Mohini Akshay Singh		

=== Web series ===
Year	Title	Role	Platform	Notes
2019	Flip	Anvita	Eros Now	Episode: "Happy Birthday"
2019	Booo Sabki Phategi		ALTBalaji	

=== Musicals ===
Year	Film	Role
2012	Jhumroo	Lead
