= Vartak Nagar =

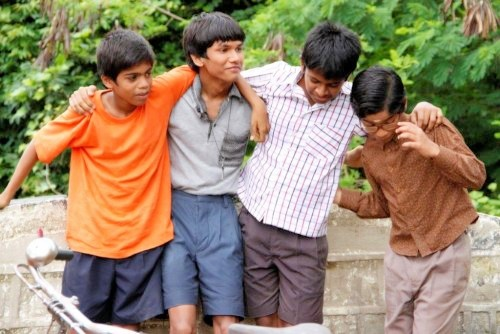
- Directed by: Atul Taishete
- Produced by: Amit Agarwal; Non Stop Entertainment
- Starring: Jimmy Shergill; Raghu Ram; Shweta Gulati
- Cinematography: Sudhakar Yakkanti
- Edited by: Suvir Nath
- Music by: Bobby-Imran
- Production companies: Adarsh Telemedia; Kunal Kohli Productions; Non Stop Entertainment
- Release date: 2016
- Country: India
- Language: Hindi

Vartak Nagar is a Hindi language drama film directed by Atul Taishete.

== Concept ==
The primary layer is a fun-filled nostalgic trip of the 80's, the glorious school days, the eccentric teachers, and the school pranks. The innocence of that age is captured through the carefree lives of Gajya, Satya, Raju and Savio. They live in Vartak Nagar which is located in Mumbai and attend an English medium school. The fathers of Raju and Satya work in Sitaram mills.

The second layer, which follows the animosity between the don Bala Chavan and union leader Kunwar Singh, is a look at the gangster era in the 80s in the city of Mumbai. Bala Chavan is the ferocious gangster working for the mill owner and Kunwar Singh is an honest mill union leader who fights for the rights of workers.

Violent clashes between Bala Chavan and Kunwar Singh lead to an event which changes the lives of the four children protagonists. The boys suddenly find themselves in adult-like situations and evolve as true and lifelong friends in the process.

The Bombay mill strike of 1982 is the driver for the story of Vartak Nagar. The catalyst used to make these two worlds collide is the historical Textile mill strike of Mumbai, considered the one landmark event which transformed Mumbai from an Industrial town to a commercial city.

The film is an entertaining roller coaster ride and promises to help us relive our carefree childhood days. The film also takes a hard look at how a seemingly small event snowballed into the longest running strike in history eventually converting the textile mills into swanky malls in the city of Mumbai two decades later.

Vartak Nagar is a funny and violent "Coming of age period film" about the childhood we share, the trust we take for granted, the promises we break and evolve as true friends in the process.

The film was screened at Cinequest Film Festival (San Jose, California) and received a great response.

== Cast ==
- Jimmy Shergill as Bala Chavan
- Raghu Ram as Kunwar Singh
- Shweta Gulati as Mona alias Lal Pari
- Jayesh Kardak as Satyanarayan Moorthy alias Satya
- Ashitosh Gaikwad as Raju Thorat
- Shantnu Rangnaker as Gajanan Shenoy alias Gajya
- Mohak Meet as Savio Fernandes
