= Rajiv Lakshman =

Producer

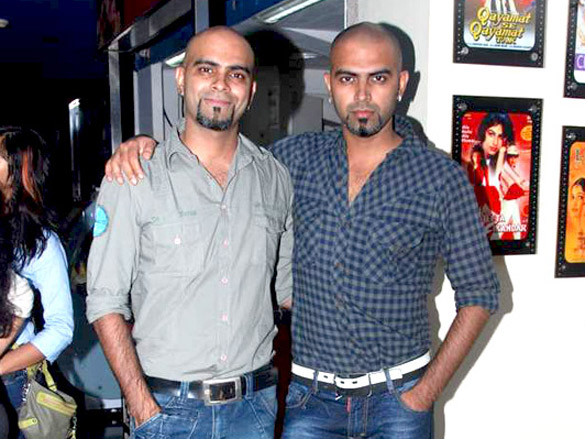
- Raghu Ram and Rajiv Lakshman (L-R)
- Born: Rajiv Lakshman Ambadapudi; 15 April 1973 (age 53); Machilipatnam, Andhra Pradesh, India
- Occupations: television personality; producer; actor
- Years active: 2000–present
- Known for: MTV Roadies, The Big Break
- Spouse: Susan Lakshman

Rajiv Lakshman Ambadapudi (born 15 April 1973) is an Indian television presenter and an actor. He is majorly known for presenting television series, MTV Dropout Pvt Ltd and MTV Roadies. He is the twin brother of Raghu Ram.

== Early life and education ==
Rajiv Lakshman was born into a Telugu family in New Delhi, along with his twin brother, Raghu Ram. He also has sister, Supriya.

Lakshman studied at the Woodstock School in Landour, Uttarakhand, and later attended the University of Delhi colleges, Deshbandhu College, and Sri Venkateswara College.

== Career ==
Lakshman has been involved in the show MTV Roadies since 2001. He is also involved in production work of the Stunt reality program Jaanbaaz. He starred in 2010 alongside brother Raghu in the film Tees Maar Khan. Rajiv has appeared in Comedy Nights Bachao. In 2015, Rajiv appeared in a movie called "Dhanak."

Pairing with his brother Raghu again, Rajiv was seen in MTV Dropout Pvt Ltd, a reality television show for budding entrepreneurs. In 2019, he and his brother Raghu, starred in Amazon Prime's Skulls and Roses. The show received negative reviews and therefore it was not continued for a second season. In 2021, he starred in the Tamil film Doctor as Alvin, with his twin Raghu playing Melvin.

In 2026, Rajiv created India's first multi platform and multi discipline talent hunt called The Big Break in partnership with casting director Mukesh Chhabra and choreographer Bosco–Caesar
