= Doctor (2021 film) =

2021 Indian film by Nelson Dilipkumar

- Theatrical release poster
- Directed by: Nelson Dilipkumar
- Written by: Nelson Dilipkumar
- Produced by: Sivakarthikeyan
- Starring: Sivakarthikeyan; Vinay Rai; Priyanka Mohan
- Cinematography: Vijay Kartik Kannan
- Edited by: R. Nirmal
- Music by: Anirudh Ravichander
- Production companies: KJR Studios; Sivakarthikeyan Productions
- Distributed by: KJR Studios
- Release date: 9 October 2021
- Running time: 151 minutes
- Country: India
- Language: Tamil
- Budget: ₹25 crore
- Box office: est. ₹100 crore

Doctor is a 2021 Indian Tamil-language action black comedy film written and directed by Nelson Dilipkumar. It was produced by Sivakarthikeyan under his company Sivakarthikeyan Productions along with KJR Studios. The film stars Sivakarthikeyan, Vinay Rai and Priyanka Mohan (in her Tamil debut), with Archana Chandhoke, Yogi Babu, Milind Soman, Redin Kingsley, Deepa Shankar, Sunil Reddy and Shiva Aravind in supporting roles. It follows a military doctor (Sivakarthikeyan), who seeks to rescue his ex-fiancée's niece from a child trafficker.

The film was officially announced in December 2019. Principal photography commenced the same month and wrapped by early-January 2021. It was shot in Chennai and Goa. The film's music was composed by Anirudh Ravichander, cinematography handled by Vijay Kartik Kannan, and editing by R. Nirmal.

Doctor was released in theatres on 9 October 2021, following multiple delays related to the COVID-19 pandemic. It received positive reviews from critics and grossed over ₹100 crore at the box office. A potential sequel was announced in 2023.

== Plot ==
Varun is a military doctor working in the Indian Army Medical Corps. While returning from a mission, his fiancée Padmini cancels their wedding, belittling him for being emotionally distant. While leaving, Varun and Padmini's family learn that Chinnu, Padmini's niece, has gone missing. The family complains to the police who in turn appoint Bhagat, a low-ranking police officer, to monitor the family's communications.

Disillusioned with the police's progress, Varun plots to kidnap the assistant commissioner's daughter, believing that the resulting investigation will be more competent. His plan works, and the police nab every major criminal related to child kidnapping. Varun singles out three criminals – Kamala Kannan, Kamesh, and Pratap – who were around Chinnu's school at the time of her disappearance. He interrogates them by blackmailing them with kidneys that he supposedly removed from them. Kamala Kannan confesses to kidnapping Chinnu and handing her over to a child trafficking network. Varun then recruits Pratap and Bhagat to assist in his investigation.

Varun's search up the traffic network leads him to the dangerous twins Alvin and Melvin. Varun and Padmini's family confront the duo inside a train, succeed in separating them, and abduct Alvin. Desperate to save Alvin, Melvin agrees to release one girl from his group of kidnapped girls. Although Chinnu is among them, Varun demands that Melvin release all the girls despite the family's objections. Melvin refuses but reveals that the girls are being taken to Goa.

The group then solicit gangsters Mahaali and Killi, posing as a group of kidnappers, and propose a heist scheme. Unaware of Varun's ruse, Mahaali and Killi agree to the deal, and follow the group to Goa. They discover that the mastermind behind the recent kidnappings is Terry, a hotel owner who uses his high-end resort as a front for his illegal child trafficking syndicate.

Varun orchestrates a scenario where Mahaali and Killi act like they are kidnapping Padmini. Subsequently, Padmini's family urge Terry to find her. Terry traces Padmini's kidnapping to Varun, who is posing as a child trafficker masquerading as the owner of an ice cream parlour. Varun demands Terry to hand over a girl as compensation for saving Padmini and arranges for his friend Colonel James Anderson and his commandos to apprehend Terry. However, after Terry escorts Varun to his base of operations on a remote island, Varun realizes that military action would endanger the kidnapped victims' lives. Despite James' protests, Varun calls off the operation.

Determined to save the girls' lives, Varun negotiates a deal with Terry and Terry's father to ship a consignment of 40 girls to Don Pablo El-Fino, a Brazilian child-trafficking boss (in reality, Varun's father in disguise). Concurrently, Terry organizes a meeting with his associates to discuss the upcoming deal, with Melvin in attendance. Varun discreetly orders Melvin to kill Terry; but Varun himself thwarts the attempt in order to gain Terry's trust. Terry interrogates Melvin and learns about Alvin's abduction. Melvin is unwilling to reveal the identity of Alvin's abductor, so Terry kills him.

Later, while searching through the family profiles of the twins' latest victims, Terry discovers Padmini's family and deduces Varun's plan. Terry has Chinni and the group apprehended and takes them to his island, intending to kill them. However, Alvin appears, seeking revenge for Melvin's death. Having abducted Terry's father, Alvin agrees to spare him in return for letting the group and the kidnapped girls leave.

After the group leaves the Island, Alvin kills Terry's father to avenge Melvin's death, and Terry kills him in retribution. Elsewhere, Varun realises he has left a girl behind and returns to the island alone. Terry apprehends Varun and plans to murder the lone girl in front of him but is thwarted by James's team, who infiltrate the base in the nick of time. Varun escorts the girl to safety while James's team kills Terry and his henchmen.

Three months later, Padmini reconciles with Varun, and they marry with their family and friends present. The police finally show up and say they found Chinnu's kidnapper Kamala Kannan.

== Cast ==
- Sivakarthikeyan as Major / Dr. N. Varun
- Vinay Rai as Terry
- Priyanka Mohan as Padmini "Mini"
- Yogi Babu as Pratap
- Milind Soman as Colonel James Anderson
- Archana Chandhoke as Sumathi, Mini's sister-in-law and Chinnu's mother
- Deepa Shankar as Preethi, the family maid
- Arun Alexander as Navneeth, Mini's brother and Chinnu's father
- Ilavarasu as Padmini and Navneeth's father
- Redin Kingsley as Bhagat
- Raghu Ram as Melvin, Alvin's brother
- Rajiv Lakshman as Alvin, Melvin's brother
- Bikramjeet Kanwarpal as Terry's father
- Zaara Vineet as Priyanka alias Chinnu
- Karate Karthi as Gabbar, a gangster and Terry's henchman
- Sreeja Ravi as Varun's mother
- Sunil Reddy as Mahaali
- Shiva Arvind as Killi
- Bjorn Surrao as Pratap's competitor
- Harshad as Gabbar's henchman
- Pillayar Ruthru as a kidnapper and Pratap's friend.
- Aathma Patrick as Pratap's friend
- Priyadarshini Rajkumar as School Principal
- Gouri Sankar Krishna Moorthy as a Terrorist

Cameo appearances

- G. Marimuthu as a Police officer
- Shaji Chen as Daniel D'Souza

== Production ==
=== Development ===
In July 2019, Sivakarthikeyan contacted Nelson Dilipkumar about starring in the director's second film after Kolamaavu Kokila (2018) when he released a casting call. After a series of tweets, both agreed to finalise the dates soon. Though it was reported that the potential film would be produced by the Indian branch of Sony Pictures in their maiden production in Tamil, this proved untrue. On 1 December, Sivakarthikeyan announced he would be producing the film, titled Doctor, under his own banner Sivakarthikeyan Productions, whilst KJR Studios were announced as the co-producers. Vijay Kartik Kannan served as cinematographer, R. Nirmal as editor, D. R. K. Kiran as art director and the duo Anbariv as stunt choreographers.

=== Casting and filming ===
Priyanka Mohan plays the leading actress, marking her debut in Tamil cinema. Vinay Rai and Yogi Babu joined the cast in December, with Rai playing the antagonist. Archana Chandhoke's daughter Zaara Vineet made her feature film debut as the kidnapped girl. Bollywood actors and brothers Raghu Ram and Rajiv Lakshman were signed on for antagonistic roles, marking their Tamil debut.

Principal photography began in Chennai on 6 December 2019. On 6 January 2020, the makers completed the first schedule, and started the second schedule. As reports stated, the makers planned to shoot half of the film in Chennai, and the other half in Goa. In February 2020, Sivakarthikeyan and Nelson went to scout locations in Goa. Shooting in Goa was completed by the end of that month. Shortly thereafter, filming was suspended due to the COVID-19 pandemic in India and nationwide lockdown, with 80% of the film's shoot completed as of May 2020.

Filming resumed on 25 September, with minimal crew adhering to government rules and regulations. A special team was designated to observe that the film crew including the director and actors were abiding by the COVID-19 protocols. The final portions of the film, including one song were expected to be completed in November 2020. Principal photography wrapped on 3 January 2021.

=== Post-production ===
The post-production process of the film officially began on 11 May 2020, after the government granted permission to resume post-production works of Tamil films. On 17 September, the makers started the dubbing with a traditional puja ceremony. Sivakarthikeyan completed his dubbing portions on 1 February 2021, completing the post-production work.

== Music ==
The film's soundtrack album was composed by Anirudh Ravichander, in his sixth collaboration with Sivakarthikeyan, and second collaboration with Nelson Dilipkumar. In February 2020, Sony Music India secured the film's audio rights. The film's first single "Chellamma" was composed during the lockdown. The song was penned by Sivakarthikeyan and had lines about TikTok being banned in India. It was sung by Anirudh and Jonita Gandhi. It was released on 16 July 2020, and the song went viral on its release reaching 139 million views as of April 2025.

The second single "Nenjame" was released on 28 August 2020. It features a promotional video, directed by Nelson, featuring Sivakarthikeyan and Priyanka Mohan, shot in monochrome by cinematographer Vijay Kartik Kannan. It was reported that the song will be featured as a montage in the film. The third single "So Baby" was released on 26 February 2021, and is a "classical-western" fusion song. The last single "Soul Of Doctor" was released on 28 September 2021 and is sung by Niranjana Ramanan.

== Release ==
=== Theatrical ===
The film was released theatrically on 9 October 2021, worldwide. Apart from Tamil, the film was dubbed and released in Telugu under the title Varun Doctor. In February 2021, the makers announced that the film would be released on 26 March 2021, but this was postponed due to the 2021 Tamil Nadu Legislative Assembly election taking place in April. Later the makers announced that the film was scheduled to release on Eid on 13 May 2021. The release date of the film was postponed indefinitely due to the second wave of the COVID-19 pandemic and a new lockdown in Tamil Nadu until it was released in October 2021.

=== Home media ===
The film began streaming on Netflix and Sun NXT in early November 2021, and had its television premiere on Sun TV in the same timeframe.

== Reception ==
=== Box office ===
Doctor became the fourth highest grossing Tamil film of 2021 behind Master and Annaatthe along with Maanaadu. It collected ₹100 crores in 25 days, becoming the first Sivakarthikeyan film to achieve the feat. The film had a phenomenal run in the United States, where it surpassed the collections of Master.

=== Critical response ===
Doctor received positive reviews from critics.

M Suganth of The Times of India gave 4 out of 5 stars and wrote "All along, the writing remains solid, giving us situations that might have felt implausible in a serious film but work brilliantly because of the black comedy." Srinivas Ramanujam of The Hindu wrote "With his earlier film Kolamavu Kokila, the filmmaker proved that he could captivate audiences with the story of an ordinary family doing extraordinary things. He repeats the same trope in this outing, and the result: an intriguing tale of a family going to great lengths, to save a loved one." Haricharan Pudipeddi of Hindustan Times wrote, "Sivakarthikeyan's new film is unlike any you've seen him in before. With dark humour, Nelson adds spice to a mundane script". J. Jagannath Business Standard wrote "Like Lokesh Kanagaraj, Nelson too promises a bright future for Tamil cinema. The Tarantino-esque absurdity that he brings to the table sans pareil in Indian cinema at the moment."

== Accolades ==
At the Osaka Tamil International Film Festival 2021, Redin Kingsley won the award for Best Comedian and Zaara Vineet won for Best Child Artist. At the 4th JFW Movie Awards, Priyanka Mohan won the award for Best Debutante, and Zaara won for Best Child Artist.

== Potential sequel ==
In August 2023, Nelson announced his plans to make a sequel.
