= Hotel Kingston =

Indian television series

- The logo of the series
- Starring: See Below
- Country of origin: India
- Original language: Hindi
- No. of seasons: 1
- No. of episodes: 51

Production
- Production location: Mumbai
- Running time: 42 minutes
- Production company: Sagar Films

Original release
- Network: Star One
- Release: 11 November 2004 – 2 November 2005

Hotel Kingston is an Indian television series that aired on Star One from 11 November 2004 to 2 November 2005. It was produced by Sagar Arts.

== Plot ==
Caught in the midst of Hotel Kingston are Shelly Sahay (Sonal Sehgal) and Vishwamitra "Vish" Kelkar (Amit Varma) - the ideal lovers. She is an NRI and he is a simple middle-class guy. Their worlds come together to run the Hotel Kingston. Hate turns into liking and liking into love as these two find the perfect companions in each other.

== Cast ==
- Amit Varma as Vishwamitra "Vish" Kelkar
- Sonal Sehgal as Shelly Sahay
- Mouli Ganguly as Urvashi
- Mayank Anand as Niklesh "Nik" Mehra
- Abir Goswami as Sujeet
- Benjamin Gilani as Govind Sahay: Shelly's father
- Samantha Tremayne as Payal
- Mihir Mishra as Aryan (Episode 43 & Episode 44)
- Rakshanda Khan as Naina (Episode 43 & Episode 44)
- Keerti Gaekwad Kelkar as Chandni (Episode 20)
- Pariva Pranati as Nivriti (Episode 19)
- Vinay Jain as Yashwant (Episode 20)
- Kurush Deboo as Kidnapper
- Sujata Kumar as Devyani
- Vinod Kapoor
- Bharat Arora
- Manav Gohil as Mr. Mathur (Episode 31)
- Vishal Singh as Rajesh Kumar (Episode 32)
- Shilpa Shinde as Neena (Episode 23)
- Namrata Thapa
- Tarun Khanna as Mr. Lobo (Episode 30)
- A. K. Hangal as Anand (Episode 35 to Episode 37)
- Raju Kher as Gurudev (Episode 22)
- Sujata Thakkar
- Sunila Karambelkar
- Ajay Trehan
- Adarsh Gautam
- Roopa Divetia as Jigneshya's mother (Episode 33)
- Mukesh Rawal
- Himani Shivpuri as Binni (Episode 42)
- Amita Nangia
- Rajeeta Kochar as Maharani (Episode 1 & Episode 2)
- Gufi Paintal as Mr. Kamra (Episode 43 & Episode 44)
- Sooraj Thapar as Mr. Mane (Episode 43 & Episode 44)
- Asif Basra (Episode 2)
- Praneet Bhat (Episode 12)
- Manjeet Kular as Liza Bhatia (Episode 23)
- Ajay Arya as Vedant (Episode 33)
- Amit Divetia as Vedant's father (Episode 33)
- Pratichi Mishra (Episode 26)
- Muskaan Mihani as Radhika (Episode 37)
- Mehul Nisar as Kamal (Episode 37)
- Arjun Punj as Kuljeet (Episode 19)
- Manish Raisinghan as Arnav (Episode 26)
- Sonia Kapoor as Mrs. Mehra (Episode 25)
- Amit Singh Thakur as Mr. Dang (Episode 26)
- Amit Behl as Nandit (Episode 37)
- Kanika Maheshwari as Radhika (Episode 22)
- Shilpa Mehta (Episode 17)
- Vikram Acharya as Nikhil (Episode 22)
- Rajesh Vivek as Raghuvendra Rathore (Episode 36)
- Sahil Chaddha as Mr. Purohit (Episode 23)
- Nisha Sareen as Maddy (Episode 40)
- Jaya Bhattacharya as Paya (Episode 16)
- Nasir Khan (Episode 40)
- Nigaar Khan as Jigneshya (Episode 33)
- Anang Desai (Episode 41)
- Sushmita Mukherjee (Episode 28)
- Manish Khanna as Sheel Kumar (Episode 37)
- Navin Nischol as Mr. Nayab (Episode 18)
- Mayuri Kango as Mrs. Lobo (Episode 30)
- Asrani (Episode 28)
- Viju Khote (Episode 41)
- Dinesh Hingoo (Episode 41)
- Lilliput (Episode 38)
