= Arun Alexander =

Indian actor (1973–2020)

- Arun Alexander
- Born: 14 October 1973; Madras, Tamil Nadu, India
- Died: 28 December 2020 (aged 47); Chennai, Tamil Nadu, India
- Occupation: Actor
- Years active: 1994–2020

Arun Alexander (14 October 1973 – 28 December 2020) was an Indian actor and a dubbing artist for Tamil-language films. He was a regular in Lokesh Kanagaraj and Nelson's films. He voiced Optimus Prime and Baloo in the Tamil dubs of Transformers: Age of Extinction and The Jungle Book respectively.

== Death ==
He died on 28 December 2020 due to a heart attack. The films Master, Dikkiloona and Doctor were dedicated in his honour. He was 47 years old.

== Filmography ==
Year	Title	Role	Notes
2016	Sawaari	Ponmala	
2017	Maanagaram	Winnings' kidnapping gang member	
2018	Kallachirippu		TV series
2018	Kolamaavu Kokila	Bobi	
2019	Kaithi	Paalpandi	
2019	Bigil	Minister	
2019	Jada	Elango	
2020	Topless	Johnny	TV series
2021	Master	Essaki	posthumous release
2021	Dikkiloona	Dr. Stanford/Transpa	posthumous release
2021	Doctor	Navneeth	posthumous release

== Dubbing artist ==
Year	Film	Actor	Role	Notes
1994	The Shawshank Redemption	Tim Robbins	Andy Dufresne	Tamil dubbed version
1995	Toy Story	Tom Hanks	Woody	Tamil dubbed version
1997	Men in Black	Will Smith	Agent J	Tamil dubbed version
1998	Dr. Dolittle	Eddie Murphy	Dr. Dolittle	Tamil dubbed version
2004	The Polar Express	Tom Hanks	Train Conductor	Tamil dubbed version
2006	The Pursuit of Happyness	Will Smith	Chris Gardner	Tamil dubbed version
2009	X-Men Origins: Wolverine	Hugh Jackman	Wolverine	Tamil dubbed version
2009	Sherlock Holmes	Robert Downey Jr	Sherlock Holmes	Tamil dubbed version
2009	2012	Scientist		Tamil dubbed version
2009	Avatar	Sam Worthington	Jake Sully	Tamil dubbed version
2011	Thor	Chris Hemsworth	Thor Odinson	Tamil dubbed version
2011	Fast Five		Brian O'Conner	Tamil dubbed version
2012	The Avengers	Chris Hemsworth	Thor Odinson	Tamil dubbed version
2012	Ice Age: Continental Drift		Manny	Tamil dubbed version
2013	Thor: The Dark World	Chris Hemsworth	Thor Odinson	Tamil dubbed version
2014	Rio 2			Tamil dubbed version
2014	How to Train Your Dragon 2		Eret	Tamil and Telugu dubbed versions
2014	Transformers: Age of Extinction		Optimus Prime	Tamil dubbed version
2015	Furious 7		Brian O'Conner	Tamil dubbed version
2015	Avengers: Age of Ultron	Chris Hemsworth	Thor Odinson	Tamil dubbed version
2015	Mission: Impossible – Rogue Nation	Simon Pegg	Benji	Tamil dubbed version
2016	The Jungle Book		Baloo	Tamil dubbed version
2017	It		Pennywise the Dancing Clown	Tamil dubbed version
2017	Justice League	Jason Momoa	Aquaman/Arthur Curry	Tamil dubbed version
2018	Aquaman	Jason Momoa	Aquaman/Arthur Curry	Tamil dubbed version
2019	It Chapter Two		Pennywise the Dancing Clown	Tamil dubbed version
