= Maguni Charan Das =

Gotipua dancer and guru

- Born: Raghurajpur, Puri district, Odisha, India
- Died: 5 December 2008; Raghurajpur, Puri district, Odisha, India
- Occupation: Traditional dancer
- Known for: Gotipua dance
- Awards: Padma Shri; Odisha Sangeet Natak Akademi Award; Tulsi Award

Maguni Charan Das was an Indian traditional dancer of Gotipua, a traditional dance form of Odisha.

== Life ==
He was the founder of Dasabhuja Gotipua Odishi Nrutya Praishad, a school for Gotipua dance where the art form is taught in the traditional Gurukul way. Born in Raghurajpur, in Puri district of the Indian state of Odisha, he is known to have contributed to the revival of Gotipua tradition, which is widely considered as the precursor of the classical dance form of Odissi. His style of performance is known as the Raghurajpur Gharana of Gotipua and his school provides training in the dance discipline, while taking care of the academic education of the students. He was a recipient of Odisha Sangeet Natak Akademi Award and Tulsi Award. The Government of India awarded him the fourth highest civilian honour of the Padma Shri, in 2004, for his contributions to Gotipua dance.

Das died on 5 December 2008.

== See also ==
- Gotipua
- Mardala
