= Raghurajpur =

Village in Odisha, India

Coordinates: 19°53′08″N 85°49′35″E

The village of Raghurajpur was established over 500 years ago as a dedicated settlement for artisans under the direct patronage of the Gajapati kings of Odisha.

Raghurajpur is a heritage crafts village in Puri district, Odisha, India, known for its master Pattachitra painters, an art form which dates back to 5 BC in the region, and Gotipua dance troupes, the precursor to the Indian classical dance form of Odissi. It is also known as the birthplace of the Odissi exponents Padma Vibhushan Guru and Kelucharan Mohapatra and the Gotipua dancer Padma Shri Guru Maguni Charan Das. It is also the birthplace of Shilp Guru Dr. Jagannath Mahapatra, who is a prominent Pattachitra artist and has made a huge contribution to the development of Pattachitra art and Raghurajpur village. Apart from that, the village is also home to crafts like Tussar painting, palm leaf engraving, stone carving, wood carving, cow-dung toys, papier-mache toys, and masks.

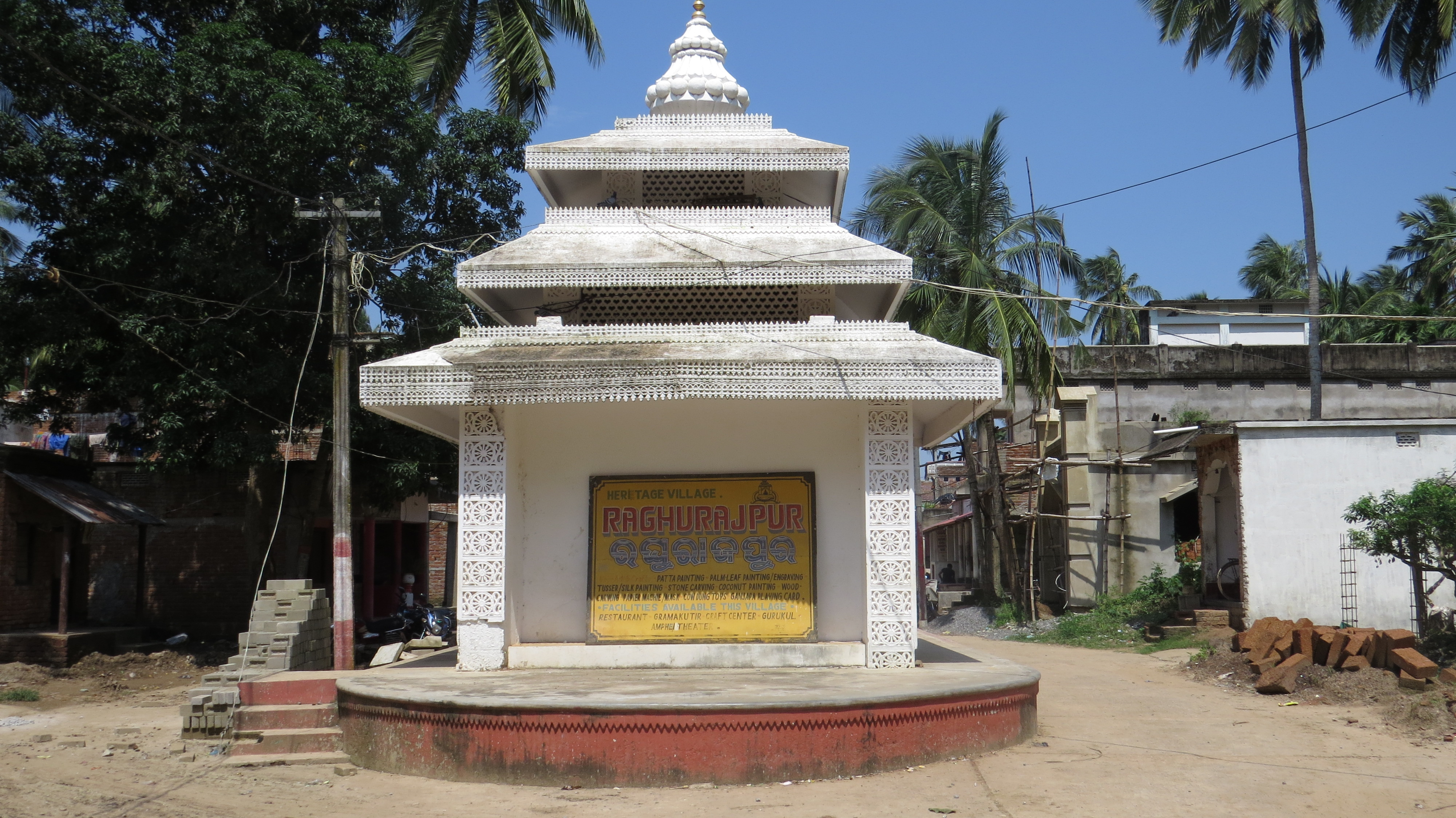
Entrance of Raghurajpur

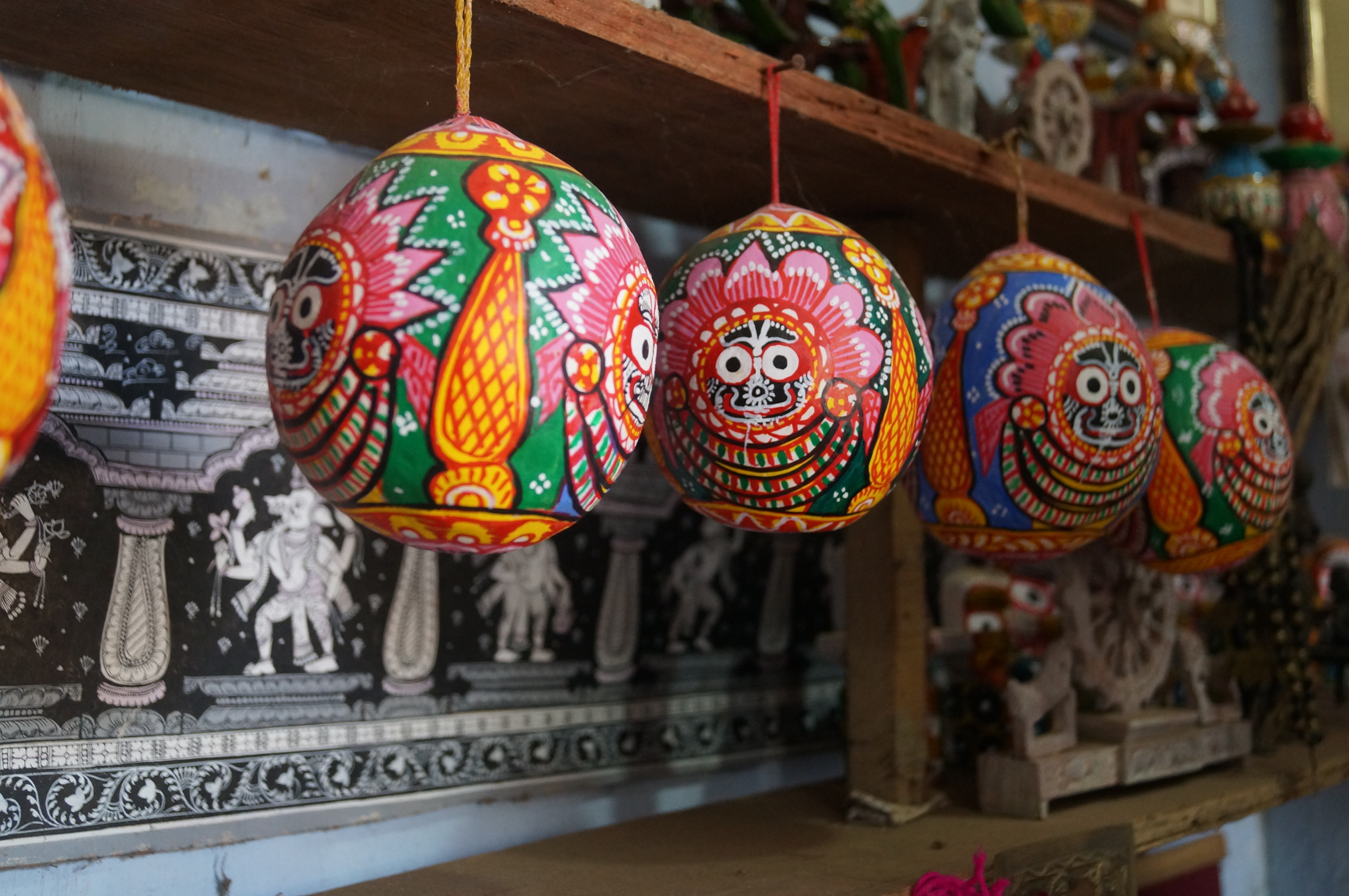
Paintings of Jagannath on betel nuts in Raghurajpur

An artist at Raghurajpur demonstrates palm leaf etching

In 2000, after a two-year research and documentation project by INTACH, the village was chosen to be developed as Odisha's first heritage village and developed as a heritage crafts village; soon the village had an interpretation centre, commissioned artwork on the walls of the artists' homes and a rest house.

It also has the distinction of being the only place where the traditional decoration called Patas is made, used under the throne of Lord Jagannath and on the three chariots during the annual Rath Yatra festival that takes place at pilgrimage town of Puri, some 14 km away, known for its Jagannath Temple.

Government and other stakeholders use online campaigns to promote Pattachitra art of Raghurajpur village.

== Overview ==
Situated amidst groves of coconut, palm, mango and jack fruit, the main village has two streets with over 120 houses, most decorated with mural paintings, where the painters reside and practice their pattachitra craft, besides many other that practices throughout the village, including traditional masks, stone idols, papier mache, sculptures, wooden toys. The village also has a series of temples dedicated not only to Bhuasuni, the local deity but also to various Hindu gods including, Radha Mohan, Gopinath, Raghunath, Laxminarayan and Gouranga.

Around 2000, it was developed as a heritage village by INTACH, and soon became a major rural tourist destination of the state, drawing tourist, both domestic and foreign to the village. Villagers were also trained to provide heritage walks to the visitors by the organisation, and has since become a template for heritage tourism in the region.

Today it is also the venue of the annual Basant Utsav – Parampara Raghurajpur (Spring Festival), which was first organised in 1993 under the aegis of State Tourism Department and Eastern Zonal Cultural Centre, Kolkata, held in the month of February/March and an important tourist draw.

== Pattachitra ==
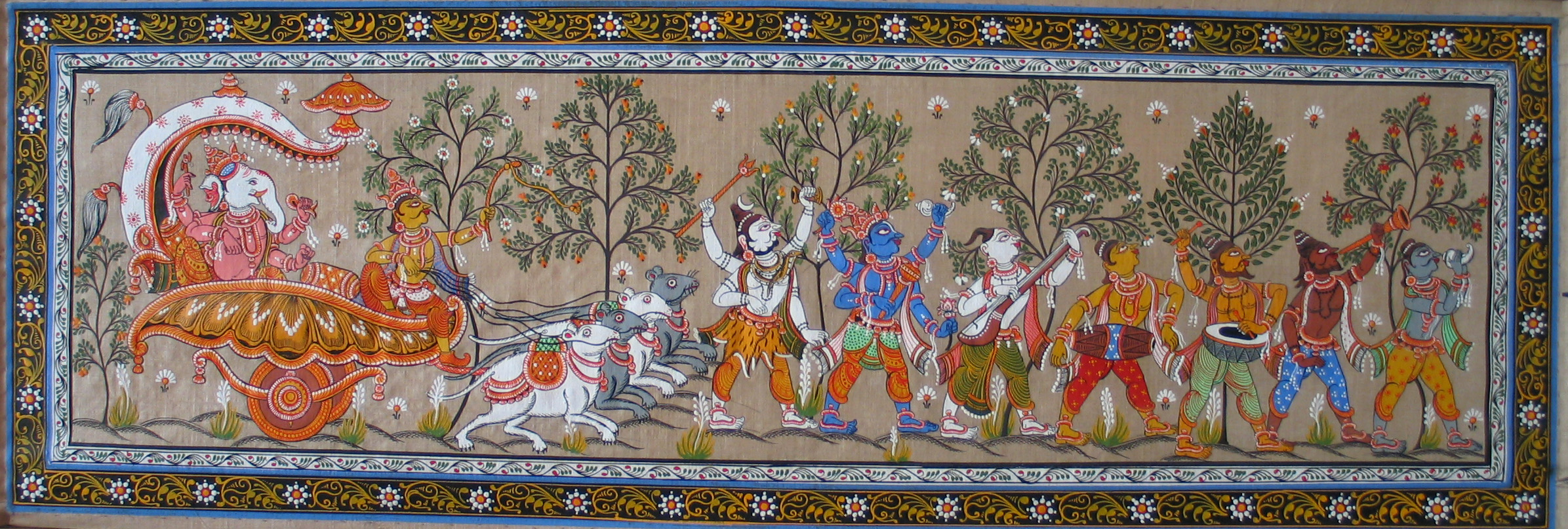
Patta Chitra painting

The pattachitra paintings are made over a piece of cloth known as Patta or layers of cotton cloth, which is first painted with layers of a paste prepared from ground tamarind seeds which prepares the base. Upon drying, it is polished with the application of chalk paste and two kinds of grinding stones. Over the prepared surface, colourful and intricate pictures of various Gods, Goddesses, and mythological scenes with ornamentation of flowers, trees and animals are then painted. The paintings on Tussar saris, especially the Sambalpuri Saree depicting Mathura Vijay, Raslila and Ayodhya Vijay owe their origin to 'Raghurajpur Pattachitra paintings'.

== Location ==
It is situated 14 km away from Hindu pilgrimage town of Puri, on the southern banks of river Bhargabi (Bhargavi). Visitors from Puri take the Bhubaneswar road, near Chandanpur, on NH-316, and upon reaching the Chandanpur Bazaar, they can take a right turn to reach Raghurajpur. The village is then around 1.5 km from Chandanpur.

This village also finds mention in The Jengaburu Curse series of SonyLIV.
