= Detective Naani =

- Theatrical poster
- Directed by: Romilla Mukherjee
- Written by: Romilla Mukherjee
- Produced by: Romilla Mukherjee; Jolly Mukherjee; Urmilla Chatterjee
- Starring: Ava Mukherjee; Zain Khan; Shweta Gulati; Amit Verma
- Cinematography: Sanjay Kapoor
- Edited by: Deepa Bhatia
- Music by: Jolly Mukherjee; Romilla Mukherjee
- Production company: Bombay Duck Films
- Distributed by: Pinpoint Productions
- Release date: 22 May 2009
- Running time: 134 minutes
- Country: India
- Language: Hindi

Detective Naani is an Indian Hindi-language mystery comedy film released on 22 May 2009. It is directed by debutante Romilla Mukherjee and stars Ava Mukherjee with Zain Khan, Amit Verma and Shweta Gulati.

== Plot ==
It's a regular day at Gulmohar Complex. Spunky, independent 72-year-old Naani is on her way back home from her daily morning walk. Suddenly her eye catches the face of a little girl peeping nervously from a 3rd floor window. The flat belongs to a newly arrived childless couple called Yadavs.

The girl hides away quickly. Naani's intrigue about the little girl leads her to a possible murder. Naani finds herself in the middle of a mystery where some people will come to her aid, some will be indifferent, and some will prove to be dangerous. When the CID dismisses Naani's story due to lack of hard evidence, she transforms into a detective.

She uses her home-spun common sense and logic, and she carries out her investigation in classic "whodunit" style. Of course, Naani's rather eccentric methods of investigation lead to many quirky and humorous incidents. Her unusual team of deputies consists of her two inquisitive little grandchildren, Anjali and Nakul, her divorced daughter, Priya Sinha, and a couple of teenagers, Rohan and Neeti.

The search for one lost little girl leads Naani & Co. to a racket where the stakes are high, the criminals are ruthless, and their leader is powerful. Once Naani gets too close to their trail, she endangers herself. She finds herself sharing the same plight as the little girl she had seen in the window. Naani's team of amateur detectives gets together and finally wins the day with a little help from the CID.

The two squabbling teenagers fall in love; there is a whiff of a romance between Naani's divorced daughter and the dashing CID Inspector. Old Mr. Pal finds renewed energy and interest in life. And of course, a lost 4-year-old little girl, Neelima Daamle, is finally reunited with her mother. The Yadavs are sent to jail for the crime of sex trafficking.

== Cast ==
- Ava Mukherjee as Naani
- Simran Singh as Anjali Sinha
- Amit Verma as Rohan Malhotra
- Shweta Gulati as Neeti Tipnis
- Ankur Nayyar as CID Inspector Bhatia
- Zain Khan as Nakun Somesh Dutt
- Saili Shettye as Little Kidnapped Girl Neelima Daamle
- Hemu Adhikari as Mahesh Pal
- Atul Parchure as Petook
- Hemant Pandey as Tattu
- Sanjeeva Vatsa as Raj Yadav
- Shubhangi Gokhale as Madhu Pal
- Jaywant Wadkar as Goonda Pakya
- Sanjay Singh as Goonda Choti
- Amrita Raichand as Priya Sinha
- Mahru Sheikh as Tara
- Kshitee Jog as Ritu (Ajit's Fiancé)

== Reception ==
Shashi Baliga of Hindustan Times gave the film 1.5 out of 5, writing, "Debutante director Romilla Mukherjee has her lead actress play the nani sugary-sweet, most of the characters verge on caricatures, and there is some pretty amateurish acting (save for Ankur Nayyar as a CID Inspector). Throw in a teenage romance and some completely unnecessary songs to make matters worse." Shubhra Gupta of The Indian Express wrote, "Detective Naani could have been a perfect summer hols film... But the story-telling needed to have been much crisper. And at two hours twenty minutes, it is way too long to keep short attention spans fully engaged." Indo-Asian News Service wrote, "After a good beginning and an average middle portion, the last few reels manage to pull back the movie, saving it from being an entirely lame exercise."
