= Mirai =

Mirai may refer to:

== Arts and entertainment ==
=== Fictional entities ===
- JDS Mirai, a ship in the manga Zipang

=== Film and television ===
- Mirai (2018 film), a Japanese animated film
- Mirai (2025 film), an Indian Telugu-language film
- Mirai (web series), a 2023 Maldivian crime thriller series

=== Music ===
- Mirai (band), a Czech pop music group
- Mirai, a Singaporean girl group that included Olivia Ong
- "Mirai" (song), by Kylee, 2013
- "Mirai (Ashita)", a song by BtoB, 2015
- "Mirai", a song by Garnidelia, the ending theme of Gunslinger Stratos: The Animation, 2015
- "Mirai", a song by L'Arc-en-Ciel, 2021

== Computing ==
- Mirai (software), a 3D creation and editing suite
- Mirai (malware), used for launching distributed denial-of-service attacks

== People ==
- Mirai (given name), a Japanese given name
- Mirai (wrestler) (1982–2005), Japanese professional wrestler

== Places ==
- Miraí, a municipality in Minas Gerais, Brazil
- Mirai by Nirman, a high-rise building in Dhaka, Bangladesh

== Other uses ==
- Mirai Foods, a Swiss food technology company
- RV Mirai, a Japanese oceanographic research vessel
- Toyota Mirai, a hydrogen fuel cell vehicle
