= Mirai (given name) =

Japanese name
- Kanji: 未来, 未來
- Hiragana: みらい
Transcriptions
- Romanization: mirai

Mirai (未来 or 未來) is a Japanese given name. It means "future" and is part of the Sino-Japanese vocabulary (its cognates include Mandarin Chinese weilai and Korean mirae).

Coincidentally, it is also a Shona name meaning "wait".

== People ==
- Mirai Aoshima (青嶋 未来; born 1995), Japanese professional shogi player
- Mirai Kawashima (川嶋 未来; born 1970), frontman of Sigh
- Mirai Moriyama (森山 未來; born 1984), Japanese actor
- Mirai Nagasu (長洲 未来; born 1993), American figure skater
- Mirai Navrátil (born 1992), Czech (born in Japan) singer
- Mirai Shida (志田 未来; born 1993), Japanese actress
- Mirai Yamamoto (山本 未來; born 1974), Japanese actress

== Fictional Characters ==
- Mirai, a character in the Senran Kagura series.
- Mirai Asahina (朝日奈 みらい), a main character in Maho Girls PreCure!
- Mirai Moriyama (森山 未来), initially named as Domon Junior (ドモンジュニア), Domon/Time Yellow's son, in Mirai Sentai Timeranger
- Mirai Hibino, the main character in Ultraman Mebius
- Mirai Iwaki, a character in Guru Guru Pon-chan
- Mirai Kamiki (カミキ・ミライ), a character in Gundam Build Fighters Try
- Mirai Kasuga (春日 未来), a character in The Idolmaster Million Live!
- Mirai Kuriyama (栗山 未来), a character in Beyond the Boundary
- Mirai, a character in the Kemono Friends multimedia franchise.
- Mirai Momoyama (桃山 みらい), a character in Kiratto Pri Chan
- Mirai Onozawa (小野沢 未来), a character in Tokyo Magnitude 8.0
- Mirai Oota (太田 未来), the titular character in Mirai
- Mirai Yashima (ミライ・ヤシマ), a character in Mobile Suit Gundam
- Mirai Wakaba (若葉 みらい), a character in Puella Magi Kazumi Magica
- Mirai Sarutobi (猿飛ミライ), a character in the manga and anime series Naruto and Boruto
