= Gayatri Patel Bahl =

Indian American actor

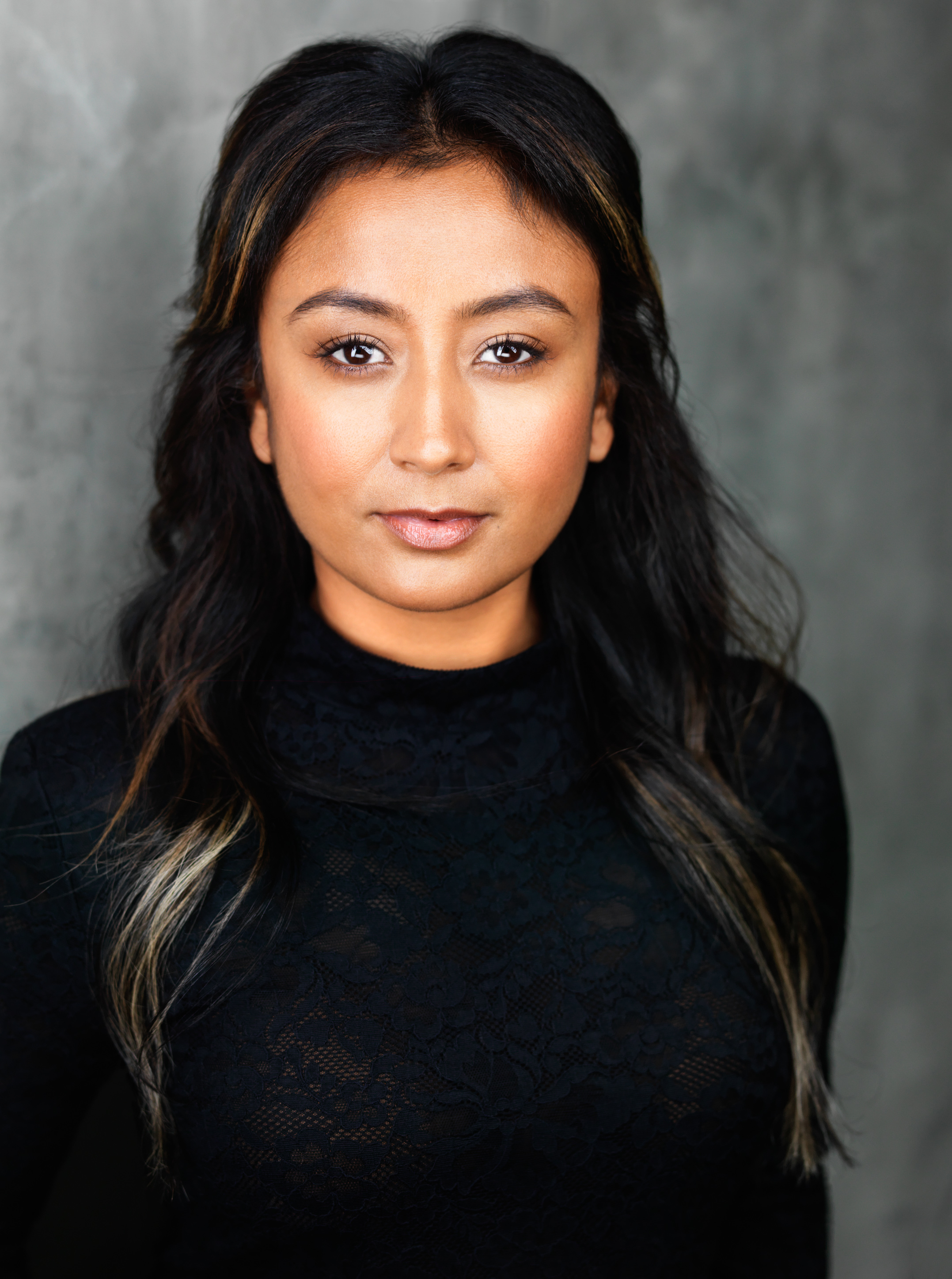
- Gayatri Patel Bahl
- Born: Gayatri Patel; 1986 or 1987 (age 38–39); United States
- Occupation: Actress
- Spouse: Sumeet Bahl
- Children: 1

Gayatri Patel Bahl is an American actress, filmmaker, and Indian classical dancer, who appears in Hindi and English language films.

== Biography ==
=== Personal life ===
Patel was born and raised in United States in a Gujarati family. She studied at Emory University in Atlanta, Georgia. She is married to Sumeet Bahl and has a son.

=== Career ===
Before starting her career as an actress with the film Let's Dance, Patel Bahl performed in many dance competitions. During her time at Emory, she won Miss India Georgia. She was also first runner-up in the Miss India United States competition. She has participated in classic English plays at Emory University, performing roles such as Irina for Chekhov's Play, Three Sisters.

While in India, Patel Bahl starred in four music videos produced by Venus Films and starring herself opposite Jugal Hansraj. Her debut film in Bollywood is Let's Dance. She guest starred in Yash Raj's Rishta.com as Husna in episode 19 of season 1.

Moving back to New York City, Patel Bahl has guest starred on FBI: Most Wanted, Partner Track, New Amsterdam 2018 TV Series, Law & Order SVU, and appeared in Martin Scorsese's Vinyl, Mr. Robot, and Showtime's Loudest Voice.

In April 2017, Patel Bahl was featured in Elle Magazine US as a part of the Elle Magazine's Movement Series.

She is the writer, director, co-producer and star of the award-winning short film, TINA.

== Training ==
Patel has taken training in Kathak from various teachers. At 15, she went to Bangalore and was trained by Maya Rao. In Mumbai, she took training from Vijayshree Chaudhary, who herself trained under Pandit Birju Maharaj in Delhi for about 10–12 years.

For fluency in Hindi language, she started training with Satyadev Dubey along with sitting in on Makrand Deshpande's rehearsals. She also trained with Veena Mehta, who trained the cast of Jaane Tu Ya Jaane Na.

== Filmography ==
As actress

Year	Movie	Role
2004	Tum Bin (Short film)	
2004	Surma Surma (Short film)	
2004	Hote Hot (Short film)	
2004	Dheere Dheere Rafta Rafta (Short film)	
2005	Ssukh	
2009	Let's Dance	Suhani
2010	Waiting Room (Short film)	
2010	Rishta.com 19th Episode (TV show)	
2010	Rishta.com 19th Episode (TV show)	
2014	Inevitable (TV series)	Manasa
2014	Redrum (TV series documentary)	Ms. Reed
2014	Just My Luck (TV series)	Deedee
2015	Law & Order: Special Victims Unit (TV series)	Jiya Alexander
2017	Petty Therapy (Short film)	Gangi
2018	Fashionables (TV series)	Sageeta
2019	Tina (Short film)	Tina Desai
2019	The Loudest Voice (TV mini-series)	Assistant
2019	Mr. Robot (TV series)	
2021	New Amsterdam (TV series)	Dr. Priya Sharma
2022	FBI Most Wanted (TV series)	Diya Ansari
2022	Partner Track (TV series)	Francine Lindehoff

As filmmaker

Year	Movie	Role
2009	Let's Dance	Co-producer
2010	Waiting Room (Short film)	Co-producer
2014	Just My Luck (TV series)	Co-producer
2019	Tina (Short film)	Executive producer, Director
2021	Diner Banter (Web Series)	Executive producer, Director, Co-Creator

== See also ==
- Let's Dance
- List of Indian film actresses
