= Rajeev Sethi =

Indian artist

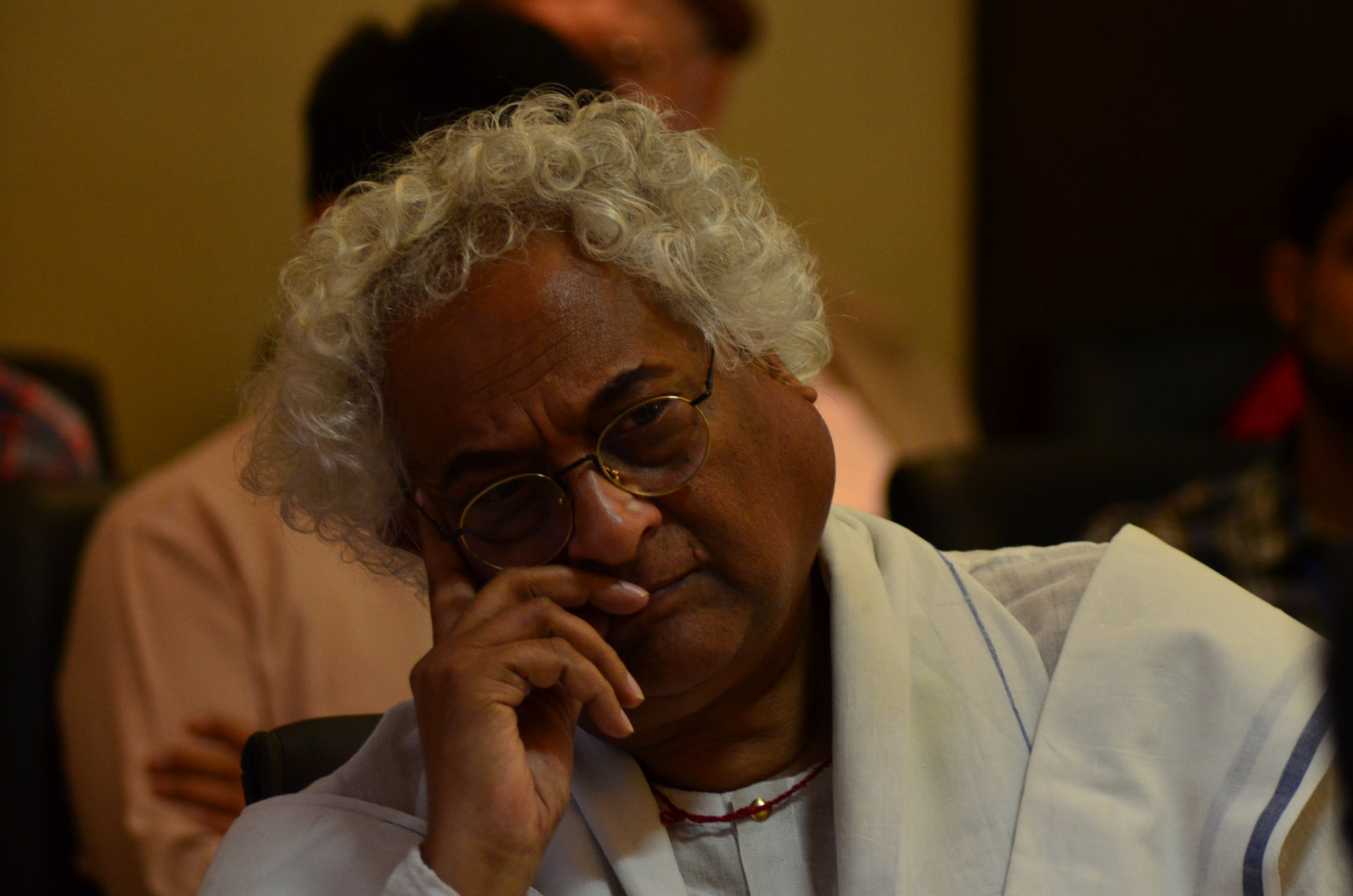
- Born: 24 May 1949 (age 76); Delhi
- Occupations: scenographer, interior designer, art curator
- Website: www.rajeevsethi.com

Rajeev Sethi (born 24 May 1949) is an Indian designer, scenographer and art curator.

In 1986, he was awarded the Padma Bhushan, India's third highest civilian award, by the Government of India.

== Early life and background ==
Sethi was born in Delhi to freedom fighter parents. His mother, Krishna Sethi was a member of Delhi's first Legislative Assembly and his father Kishorilal Sethi was a businessman and a poet. He also had four elder sisters. He went to Modern School, New Delhi and studied history at St. Stephen's College, Delhi.

== Career ==
Sethi spent his formative years in Paris, where he first went to study graphic art on a scholarship. Thereafter he trained under painter and printmaker Stanley William Hayter at his studio, Atelier 17. He was mentored by American designers Ray and Charles Eames. Finally he got a chance to work at studio of French designer, Pierre Cardin. Meanwhile, in 1960, he designed Delhi's first discotheque, Cellar at Regal Building, Connaught Place.

He is curator and founder-chairman of the Asian Heritage Foundation. He designed the Jaya He GVK New Museum at the brand new T2 terminal in Mumbai.

He is also part of INTACH and a member of its first Governing Council.

=== Jaya He GVK New Museum ===
The Jaya He Museum occupies an area of 3 km with 80,000 sq ft of wall space at the Mumbai T2 terminal. The Jaya He GVK New Museum is the centerpiece of the new airport terminal.

== Projects ==
- VIP Lounge, Delhi International Airport (1984)
- Shah House, Mumbai (1985–86)
- Spice Route Restaurant, the Imperial Hotel, New Delhi (1988–95)
- Laxmi Machine Works Headquarters, Coimbatore (1996)
- Art at the Grand Hyatt, Mumbai (2003)
- Hampi Resort (2006)
- Leela Kempinski (2008)
- Art at Hyatt (2012)
- Terminal 2 - Mumbai Airport (2014)

== Awards and recognition ==
- Sanskriti Award for the field of outstanding social and cultural achievement (1980)
- National order of the Padma Bhushan from the president of India (1985)
- Honour Summus Medal by Watumull Foundation USA for design (1987)
- Designer of the Year, Interior Design - the Publication's Inaugural award (1992)
- Honoured by the Order of Merit of the Federal Republic of Germany (2001)
- Artisan Advocate by Aid to Artisans, USA (2004)
- Foundation Member of the World Academy of Art and Science, USA
- The First Indira Gandhi Lifetime Achievement Award for conservation by INTACH (Indian National Trust for Art & Cultural Heritage) 2010
