= Gotipua =

Traditional dance form of Odisha, India

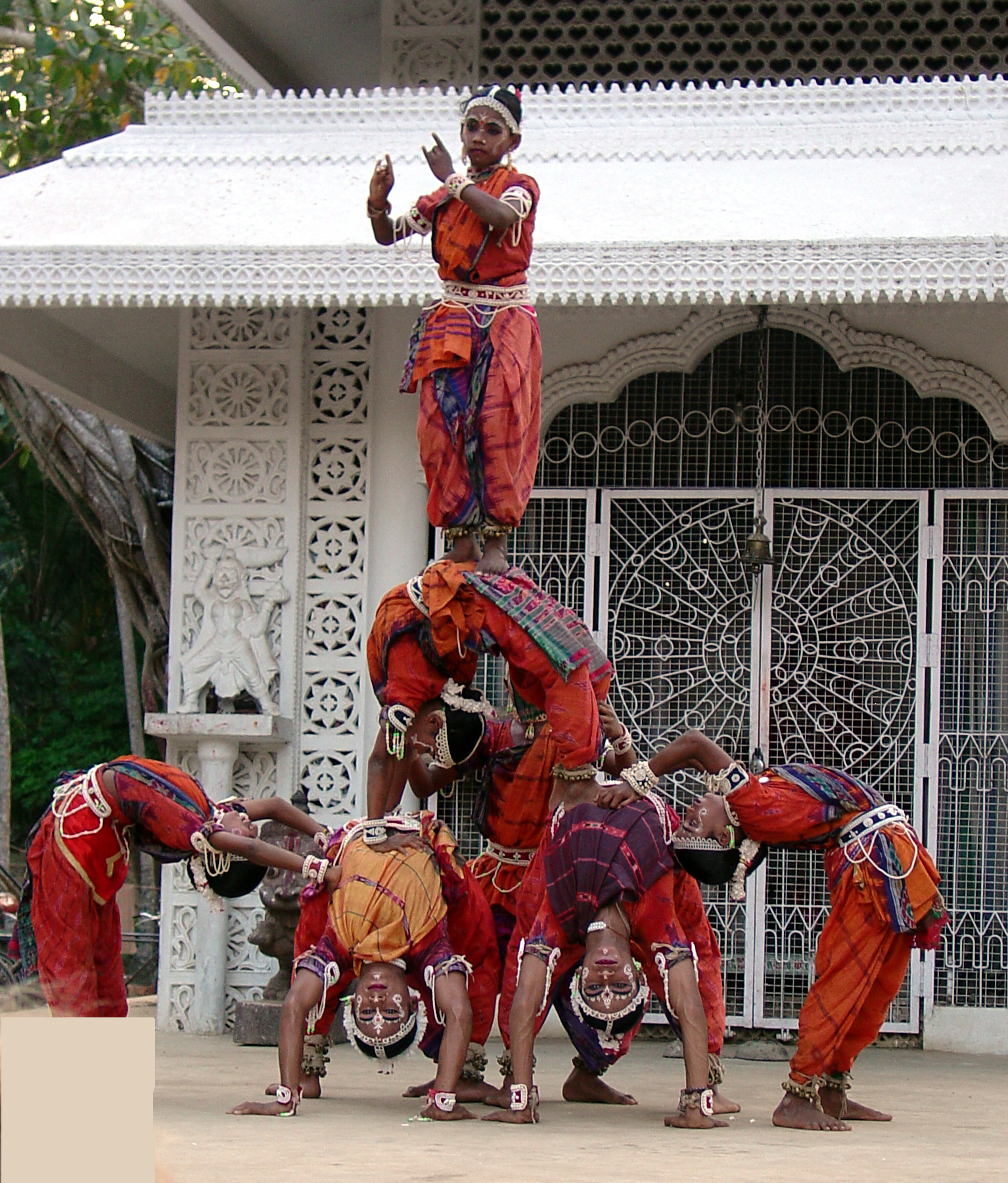
Gotipua dance in Raghurajpur

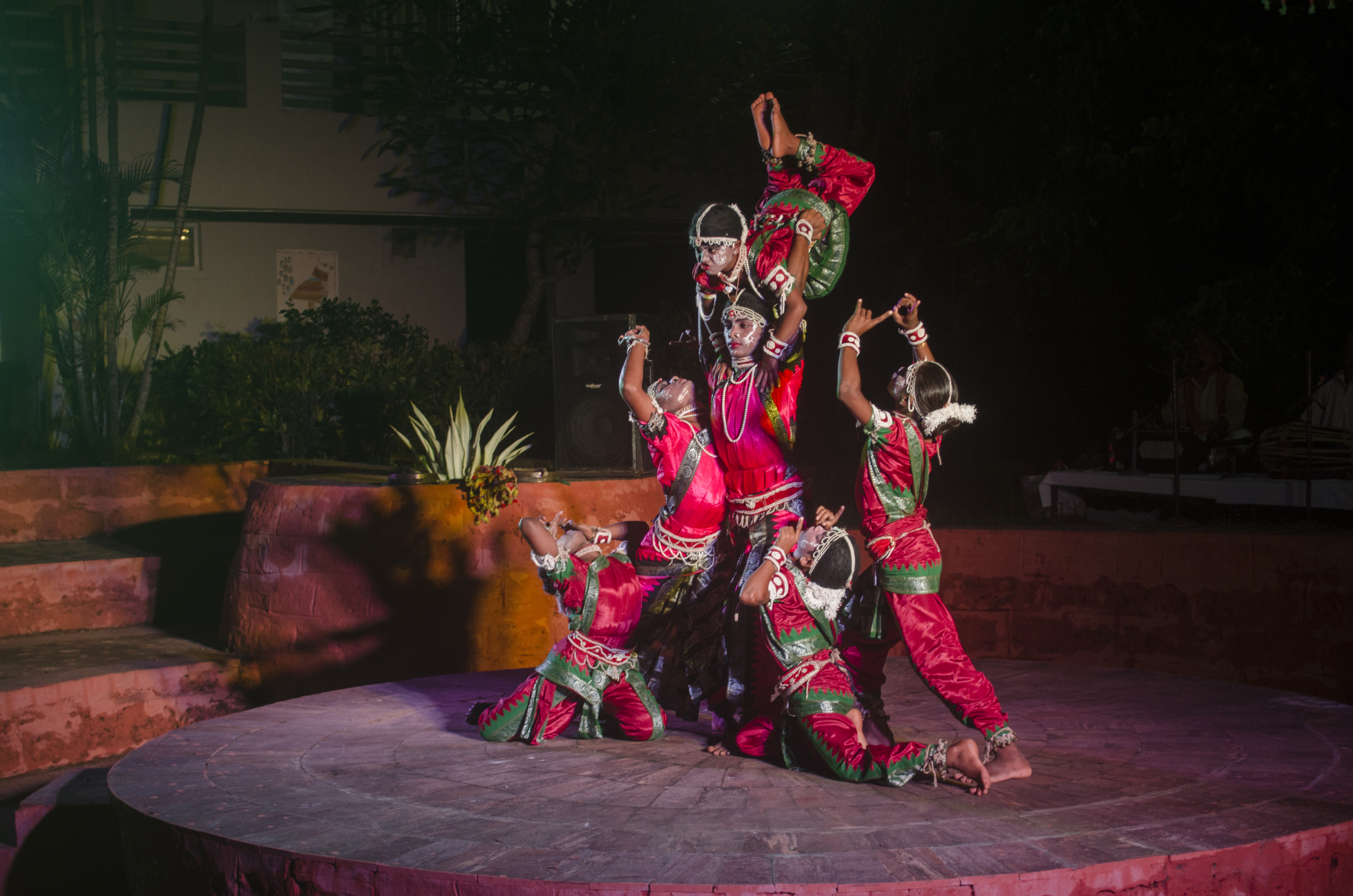
Gotipua dancers performing at Sterling Resort, Puri, Odisha

Gotipua (Odia- ଗୋଟିପୁଅ, pronounced goṭipuå) is a traditional dance form in the state of Odisha, India, and the precursor of Odissi classical dance. It has been performed in Orissa for centuries by young boys, who dress as women to praise Jagannath and Krishna. The dance is executed by a group of boys who perform acrobatic figures inspired by the life of Radha and Krishna. The boys begin to learn the dance at an early age until adolescence, when their androgynous appearance changes. In the Odia language, Gotipua means "single boy" (goti-pua). Raghurajpur, Odisha (near Puri) is a historic village known for its Gotipua dance troupes. The dance of the Gotipuas is accompanied by traditional Odissi music with the primary percussion being the Mardala.

== Dancers ==
To transform into graceful feminine dancers the boys do not cut their hair, instead they style it into a knot and weaving garlands of flowers into it. They make up their faces with mixed white and red powder. Kajal is broadly applied around the eyes to give them an elongated look. The bindi, usually round, is applied to the forehead, surrounded with a pattern made from sandalwood. Traditional paintings adorn the face, which are unique to each dance school.

The costume has evolved over time. The traditional dress is a Kanchula, a brightly coloured blouse with shiny decorations. An apron-like, embroidered silk cloth (nibibandha) is tied around the waist like a ruffle and worn around the legs. Some dancers still adhere to tradition by wearing a pattasari: a piece of thin fabric about 4 metres (13 ft 1 in) long, worn tightly with equal lengths of material on both sides and a knot on the navel. However, this traditional dress is often replaced by a newly designed cloth which is easier to put on.

Dancers wear specially designed, beaded jewellery: necklaces, bracelets, armbands and ear ornaments. Nose-piercing jewellery has been replaced with a painted motif. Ankle bells are worn, to accentuate the beats tapped out by the feet. The palms of the hands and soles of the feet are painted with a red liquid known as alta. The costume, jewellery and bells are considered sacred.

== History ==
Long ago, the temples in Orissa had female dancers known as devadasis (or mahari), who were devoted to Jagannath, which gave rise to Mahari dance. Sculptures of dancers on bas-reliefs in temples in Orissa (and the Konark Sun and Jagannath Temples in Puri) demonstrate this ancient tradition. With the decline of mahari dancers around the 16th century during the reign of Rama Chandra Dev (who founded the Bhoi dynasty), boy dancers in Orissa continued the tradition. Gotipua dance is in the Odissi style, but their technique, costumes and presentation differ from those of the mahari; the singing is done by the dancers. Present-day Odissi dance has been influenced by Gotipua dance. Most masters of Odissi dance (such as Kelucharan Mohapatra, from Raghurajpur) were Gotipua dancers in their youth.

Odissi dance is a combination of tandava (vigorous, masculine) and lasya (graceful, feminine) dances. It has two basic postures: tribhangi (in which the body is held with bends at the head, torso and knees) and chouka (a square-like stance, symbolising Jagannath). Fluidity in the upper torso is characteristic of Odissi dance, which is often compared to the gentle sea waves which caress the Orissa beaches.

Each year, the Guru Kelucharan Mohapatra Odissi Research Centre organises the Gotipua Dance Festival in Bhubaneswar.

== Repertoire ==
The dance typically begins with a vandana prayer (an invocation, with prayers of gratitude to Mother Earth, Jagannath and one's guru and welcoming the audience). The dancers perform a three-step salutation: the first above their heads towards God, the second in front of their faces for the guru and the third in front of their chests for the audience. The Sarigama is a dance celebrating beauty, and highlighting the mastery of technique; it is portrayed by dancers and musicians carved into the outer walls of ancient temples.

The Abhinaya is the enactment of a song and interpretation of ancient poetry. This dance depicts Radha Krishna-oriented poems, such as the 12th-century Gita Govinda. The verses used for narration are extremely ornate in content and suggestion. Graceful, fluid, and sensual, the Abhinaya resembles a moving love poem with its facial expressions, eye movement and mudra gestures:

"Come and see, my love
Here comes Krishna, the flute player, the Supreme Performer
Come and see, my love
He dances wearing ankles bells
So lovely rhythmic patterns he makes
Listen to his melodies, the mardala beats
Listen to his flute and clappings."

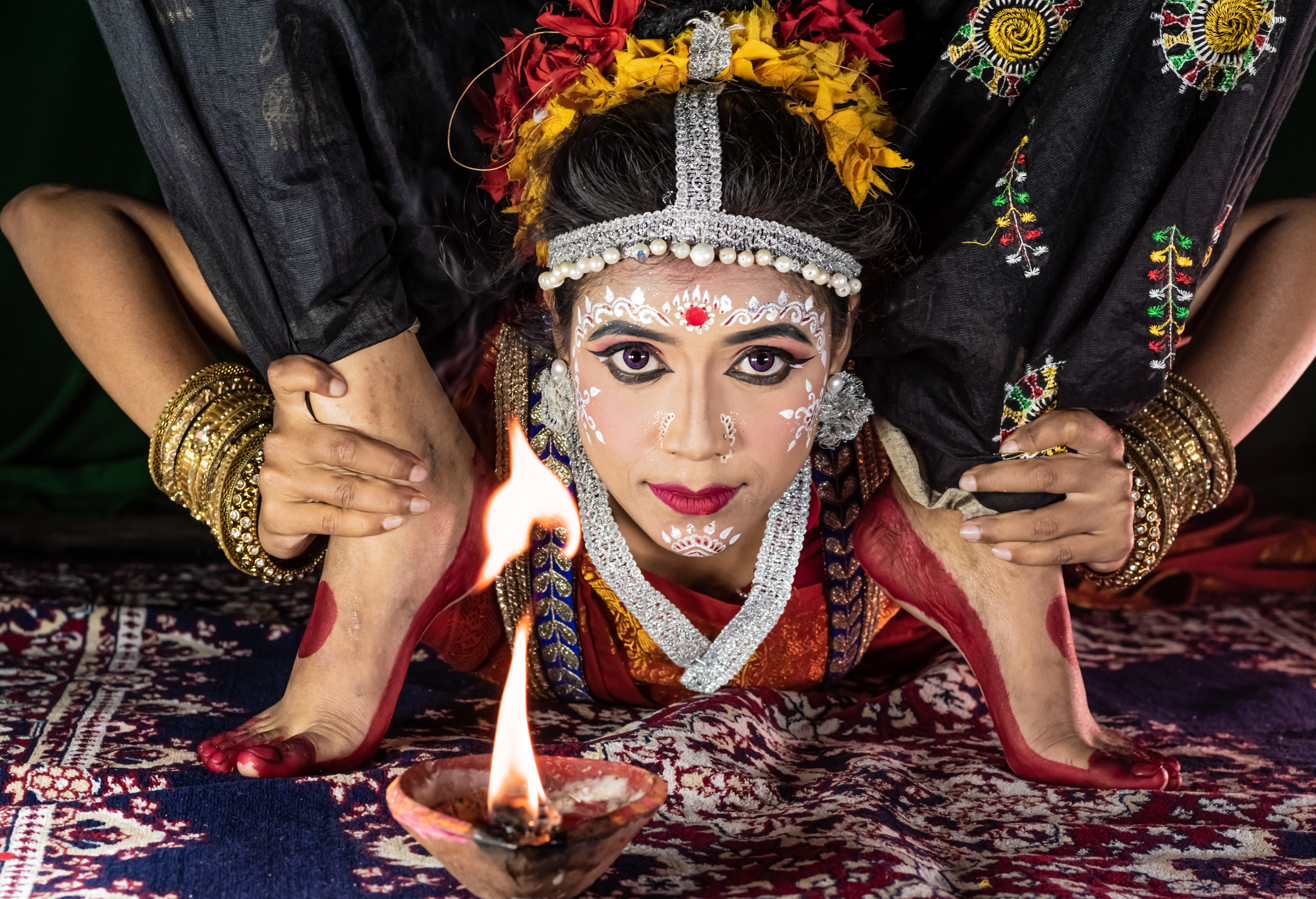
Gotipua performance

An interesting part of Gotipua is Bandha Nrutya, the presentation of acrobatic yogic postures (referring to mythological scenes from the life of Krishna) similar to visual presentations by the pattachitra artists of Orissa. The difficult and intricate poses (requiring suppleness of limb) are known as bandha ("acrobatic" in the Odia language). To perform this dance, boys need to start learning it at the age of five or six. Musical accompaniment is provided by the mardala (a two-headed drum, a percussion instrument in Orissa), gini (small cymbals), harmonium, violin, bansuri and one or two vocalists.

Abhinaya Chandrika (a 15th-century text on Odissi dance by Maheshwara Mahapatra) provides a detailed study of the movements of the feet, hands (mudras), the standing postures, movement and repertoire; it mentions more than 25 varieties of bandha including Gagana, Dhurmukha, Torona and Shayana. Sangita Darpana, a 17th-century text about music and dance, gives a complete repertory and overall style of presentation.

Some bandhas are found in oral tradition; these include:

- Chira (welcome pose)
- Padmasana (lotus pose)
- Hansa (swan; represents wisdom, grace and beauty and is a vehicle for the goddess Saraswati)
- Mayura (peacock; sacred bird of Hindu mythology, whose feathers adorn Krishna's head)
- Chara Mayura (grazing peacock, representing splendor and majesty)
- Keli kadamba (holy tree under which Krishna played)
- Garuda (mythical eagle; vehicle of Vishnu)
- Kandarpa Ratha (chariot of Kandarpa, god of love)
- Sagadi (wheel, representing the wheels of Jagannath's chariot)
- Nauka (boat)
- Kaliyadalana (the defeat of Blacksnake by Krishna)
- Bakasura (Bhima killing Bakasura in the Mahabharata)

Maguni Charan Das, Padma Shri awardee and a recipient of the Odisha Sangeet Natak Akademi Award, was one of the masters of the Gotipua dance.

== See also ==
- Folk dance forms of Orissa
- List of Indian folk dances
