= Let's Dance (2009 film) =

- Directed by: Aarif Sheikh
- Written by: Sibtain Shahidi
- Produced by: Arvind Patel
- Starring: Gayatri Patel; Ajay Chaudhary; Aquib Afzal
- Edited by: Aarif Sheikh
- Music by: Vipin Mishra; Tarali Sharma
- Release date: 19 June 2009
- Running time: 125 minutes
- Country: India
- Language: Hindi

Let's Dance is a 2009 Bollywood film that stars Gayatri Patel, Ajay Chaudhary and Aquib Afzal in the lead roles. It is directed and edited by Aarif Sheikh.

== Plot ==
Suhani, a passionate young dancer, dreams of being a star her entire life. Fourteen-year-old Aftab, a gifted dancer, has never dreamed, ever. She can see nothing beyond starring in an R.J. music video. He can see nothing beyond making a life on the streets. When she sees Aftab's gang dancing on a street corner one night, she has no idea that her dreams are about to change. She's moved by the talent these street kids possess and wants the world to give them their due. But Aftab has no faith in her dreams for them. Will she be able to restore his faith in her? Will she get them the life they deserve but cannot even dream of?

== Cast ==
- Gayatri Patel as Suhani
- Ajay Chaudhary as Neil Choudhary
- Paras Arora as Kallu
- Aquib Afzal as Rehaan Jones A.K.A. R.J.
- Aabhaas as Aftab Siddique
- Nikunj Pandey as Ali Kamran
- Sugandha Garg as Anoushka Deshmukh
- Anjan Shrivastav as Sharma Ji

== Music ==
Music of the film is by Vipin Mishra and Tarali Sharma. Music of the movie got released on 10 June 2009, at J.W. Marriott hotel, Mumbai. Malaika Arora Khan and Himesh Reshammiya were also present at the launch

No.	Title	Singer(s)	Length
1.	"Let’s Dance"	Sunidhi Chauhan, Keerthi Sagathia
2.	"Let’s Dance" (Remix)	Sunidhi Chauhan, Keerthi Sagathia
3.	"Taare Todh Ke La"	Sunidhi Chauhan, Vipin Mishra
4.	"Sansanati"	Sunidhi Chauhan, Pervez Quadri
5.	"Tumse Iqraar"	Q. Suzie, Keerthi Sagathia
6.	"Jaana Hai"	Mohit Chauhan
7.	"Koshish Koshish"	Krishna Beuraa
8.	"Let’S Dance" (Club)	Q. Suzie
