= Ava Mukherjee =

Indian film and television actress

Ava Mukherjee (c. 1929 – 15 January 2018) was an Indian film and television actress. Her best known roles included Devdas (2002), where she played Shah Rukh Khan's grandmother, and her lead role as the title character in 2009's Detective Naani. Mukherjee was also well known for her appearances in Indian commercial advertisements.

Mukherjee made her film debut in the 1965 Bengali-language film, Ram Dhakka, directed by Taru Mukherjee. However, she did not appear in another film role again for decades. Her break came in the 2000 Hindi-language movie, Snip, which relaunched her film acting career in Bollywood.

Mukherjee was next cast as Shah Rukh Khan's grandmother in the 2002 romantic drama, Devdas, directed by Sanjay Leela Bhansali. Her role in Devdas won her millions of fans throughout the country. In 2006, she appeared in the thriller anthology film, Darna Zaroori Hai.

In 2009, Mukherjee played the lead character of Naani in the mystery film, Detective Naani.

Ava Mukherjee died in Mumbai, India, on 15 January 2018, at the age of 88.
