= Amit Varma (actor) =

Indian television actor (born 1984)

- Born: Amit Varma; 6 October 1984 (age 41); Mumbai, India
- Occupation: Actor

Amit Varma is an Indian television actor, best known for his role as Vishwamitra (aka Vish) Kelkar on the television show Hotel Kingston on Star One. He has also acted in the film Kismat Konnection.

== Early life ==
Varma was born and brought up in Mumbai. He attended Don Bosco School in Matunga and HMPS later in his school-life when he moved to Andheri. He has earned a B.A. degree from Mithibai College in Mumbai.

== Career ==
Varma started his career as a stage actor. He participated in famous shows like Tash ke Patte, directed by Kader Khan. Later he decided to move on to modeling and Birla gave him his first break. After doing few more ads like Lifebuoy, VIP, Airtel and Close up, he got his first break on television in the comic show Khichdi on Star One for the character of Raju. However, it wasn't until a few more years that he was fully noticed, and finally got the role of Vish in Hotel Kingston, his first television show as a lead actor. This show not only brought him fame but it also created a "chocolate-boy image" of him, which is being associated with him till date. The actor made his debut in Tinsel town in 2008 with the movie Kismat Konnection, produced by Aziz Mirza, also starring Bollywood actors Shahid Kapoor, Vidya Balan, Vishal Malhotra, Om Puri and Juhi Chawla. He was last seen in a Telefilm with Star Plus, Teri Meri Love Stories in 2012, where he played a Geek for PLaytime Creations (Paresh Rawal).

== Filmography ==
=== Television ===
Year	Show	Role
2002–2004	Khichdi	Raju Parekh
2004–2005	Hotel Kingston	Vishwamitra (Vish) Kelkar
2005	Kituu Sabb Jaantii Hai	Rohan
2005	Instant Khichdi	Raju Parekh
2008	Annu Ki Ho Gayee Waah Bhai Waah	Ashu
2008–2010	Baa Bahoo Aur Baby	Birju Mehta
2012	Saas Bina Sasural	Jai Malhotra
2012	Teri Meri Love Stories	Madhav
2014	Badi Door Se Aaye Hain	BAIR officer
2014–2015	Box Cricket League 1	Contestant
2017	Bakula Bua Ka Bhoot	Lord Krishna
2019	Shrimad Bhagwat Mahapuran	Viprachitti
2019	Laal Ishq	Shrey
2022–2024	Wagle Ki Duniya - Nayi Peedhi Naye Kissey	Nikesh "Nick" Agarwal

=== Films ===
Year	Title	Role	Notes
2008	Kismat Konnection	Karan	
2009	Detective Naani	Rohan	
2014	Singham Returns	Mayank Anand	

=== Music videos ===
Year	Title
2006	Challa
2009	Boondh by Rajshree Agarwal

== See also ==
- Rupali Bhosale
- Surjit Saha
- Sumeet Raghavan
- Vinay Rohrra
