= Gupte =

Gupte is a surname. Notable people with this surname include:

- Amole Gupte (born 1962) is an Indian screenwriter, actor, and director
- Avadhoot Gupte
- B.A. Gupte (1851–1925), Indian ethnographer
- Baloo Gupte (1934–2005), Indian cricket player
- Chinmay Gupte (born 1972), Indian-born English orthopaedic surgeon and cricket player
- Chitaman Gupte (1916–1994), Indian cricket player
- Lalita D. Gupte
- Mahendra Gupte (1931–2017), Indian cricket umpire
- Narayan Murlidhar Gupte (1872–1947), Indian poet and scholar
- Neelima Gupte, Indian physicist
- Partho Gupte, Indian child actor
- Prabhakar Gupte, Indian cricket player
- Rango Bapuji Gupte
- Sakharam Hari Gupte (1718–1779)
- Subhash Gupte (1929–2002), cricket player
- V. M. Gupte, Indian cricket umpire
- Vandana Gupte, Indian actress
