= Ek Tara =

- Directed by: Avadhoot Gupte
- Screenplay by: Sachin Darekar
- Story by: Avadhoot Gupte; Sachin Darekar
- Produced by: Raiees Lashkaria
- Starring: Santosh Juvekar; Tejaswini Pandit
- Cinematography: Amlendu Chaudhari
- Edited by: Imran Mahadik; Faisal Mahadik
- Music by: Avadhoot Gupte
- Production company: Raiees Lashkaria Production
- Release date: 30 January 2015 (Theatrical)
- Running time: 135 minutes
- Country: India
- Language: Marathi

Ek Tara is a 2015 Indian musical drama Marathi-language film directed by Avadhoot Gupte. The film released on 30 Jan 2015. It stars Santosh Juvekar and Tejaswini Pandit in lead. It is Santosh Juvekar's third film with Avadhoot Gupte after Zenda and Morya.

== Cast ==
- Santosh Juvekar as Dyaneshwar Lokhande "Mauli"
- Tejaswini Pandit as Urja
- Urmila Nibalkar as Chatura
- Sagar Karande as Vithu
- Amol Gupte as Chhota Shaukat
- Mangesh Desai as Sadaba
- Abhedya Gupte as Omkar Lokhande, child artist
- Raiees Lashkaria as Urja’s Boss
- Sunil Tawade as Amar Thite, sarpanch
- Chaitanya Chandratre as Amogh
- Santosh Mayekar as Padmbhushan Gattamvar
- Maadhav Deochake

== Soundtrack ==
Ek Tara

Soundtrack album by Avdhoot Gupte
- Released: 29 January 2015
- Genre: Film soundtrack
- Length: 54.00
- Label: Rajshri Entertainment

Avdhoot Gupte chronology
Ek Tara (2015)	Tujhya Vin Mar Javaan (2015)

The lyrics for the film are penned by Guru Thakur, Avadhoot Gupte with music composed by Avadhoot Gupte.

=== Track listing ===
Ek Tara
No.	Title	Singer(s)	Length
1.	"Jay Jay Ram"	Avadhoot Gupte	5:11
2.	"Yed Lagala"	Avadhoot Gupte	3:58
3.	"Ardhya Halkundana"	Avadhoot Gupte	3:15
4.	"Visar Tu"	Mugdha Karhade	4:04
5.	"Zindagi Hai Zaad"	Avadhoot Gupte	3:41
6.	"Thok Sala"	Avadhoot Gupte, Swapnil Bandodkar & Abhijit Panse	4:08
7.	"Har Qash Mein"	Avadhoot Gupte	3:59
8.	"Waali Tu"	Avadhoot Gupte	5:27
9.	"Chalate Naane (Version 1)"	Suresh Wadkar	5:30
10.	"Deva Tuzya (Version 1)"	Dyaneshwar Meshram	4:12
11.	"Visar Tu (Romantic Version)"	Mugdha Karhade	4:33
12.	"Chalate Naane (Version 2)"	Avadhoot Gupte	5:31
13.	"Deva Tuzya (Version 2)"	Videet Patankar	3:42
Total length:			54:71

== Reception ==
The film has received positive reviews. Times of India's Mihir Bhanage gave film 3 stars saying, " the film is good to watch and can be put on your weekend watch list.".
