= 1934 in poetry =

Nationality words link to articles with information on the nation's poetry or literature (for instance, Irish or France).

== Events ==
- April 6 – Rudyard Kipling and W. B. Yeats are awarded the Gothenburg Prize for Poetry.
- September – T. S. Eliot (with his first love, Emily Hale) visits the English Cotswolds manor house and garden which gives rise to his poem Burnt Norton.
- September 21 – The Barretts of Wimpole Street, a film directed by Sidney Franklin with Norma Shearer as Elizabeth Barrett and Fredric March as Robert Browning, is released in the United States; remade in 1957, less successfully
- Bengali poet Buddhadeb Bosu marries singer and writer Protiva Bose (née Ranu Shome).
- The University Review is founded at the University of Kansas City. The publication is later called New Letters.
- West Indian Review founded.

== Works published in English ==
=== Canada ===
- Kenneth Leslie, Windward Rock: Poems. New York: Macmillan.
- Tom MacInnes, High Low Along.
- Frederick George Scott, Collected Poems. Vancouver: Clarke & Stuart Co. Ltd.
- Charles G.D. Roberts, The Iceberg and Other Poems. (Toronto: Ryerson).
- Theodore Goodridge Roberts, The Leather Bottle
- Seranus, Penelope and Other Poems (Toronto: Author).

=== India, in English ===
- Sri Aurobindo, Six Poems ( Poetry in English ), Chandernagore: Rameshwar and Co.
- Harindranath Chattopadhyaya, Cross Road ( Poetry in English ), Madras: Shama's Publishing House
- P. R. Kaikini, Flower Offerings ( Prose poems in English ); Bombay: Bombay Book Depot
- E. E. Speight, editor, Indian Masters of English ( Poetry in English ), London: Longmans, Green; anthology; published in the United Kingdom

=== United Kingdom ===
- Edmund Blunden, Choice or Chance
- Maud Bodkin, Archetypal Patterns of Poetry: Psychological Studies of Imagination, criticism
- Lilian Bowes Lyon, The White Hare
- Roy Campbell, Broken Record, the first version of his autobiography; South African native published in the United Kingdom
- Helen Cruickshank, Up the Noran Water, Scottish poet
- Lawrence Durrell, Transition
- T. S. Eliot, The Rock
- William Golding, Poems
- Pauline Gower, Piffling Poems for Pilots
- I. M. and H. Hubbard, The War Resisters, and Other Poems
- T. L. W. Hubbard, Poems, 1925–1934
- John Lehmann, The Noise of History
- Hugh MacDiarmid, pen name of Christopher Murray Grieve, Stony Limits and Other Poems, Scottish poet
- Ruth Pitter, A Mad Lady's Garland, preface by Hilaire Belloc
- Nan Shepherd, In the Cairngorms
- William Soutar, The Solitary Way
- E. E. Speight, editor, Indian Masters of English, London: Longmans, Green; anthology; Indian poetry in English, published in the United Kingdom
- Stephen Spender, Vienna
- Dylan Thomas, 18 Poems, including "The Force that Through the Green Fuse Drives the Flower"
- W. B. Yeats, The King of the Great Clock Tower, Irish poet published in the United Kingdom

=== United States ===
- James Agee, Permit Me Voyage
- W. H. Auden, Poems
- Paul Engle, American Song
- John A. Lomax, compiler, with Alan Lomax, American Ballads and Folk Songs
- Edna St. Vincent Millay, Wine From These Grapes
- Tillie Olsen, I Want You Women up North to Know
- George Oppen, Discrete Series
- Ezra Pound:
  - Eleven new Cantos: XXXI–XLI
  - Homage to Sextus Propertius, London
  - "Make It New"
- Edward Arlington Robinson, Amaranth
- Jesse Stuart, Man with a Bull-Tongue Plow
- William Carlos Williams, Collected Poems 1921–1931
- Yvor Winters, Before Disaster

=== Other in English ===
- R. A. K. Mason, No New Thing, New Zealand
- Shaw Neilson, Collected Poems of John Shaw Neilson, edited and with introduction by R. H. Croll, Melbourne, Lothian, Australia
- W. B. Yeats, The King of the Great Clock Tower, Irish poet published in the United Kingdom

== Works published in other languages ==
=== France ===
- Louis Aragon, Hourra l'oural
- André Breton, L'Air de l'eau
- René Char, Le Marteau sans maître
- Paul Éluard, pen name of Paul-Eugène Grindel, La Rose publique
- Alphonse Métérié:
  - Petit maroc II
  - Cophetuesques
- Benjamin Péret, De derrière les fagots
- Jules Supervielle, Les Amis inconnus

=== Indian subcontinent ===
Including all of the British colonies that later became India, Pakistan, Bangladesh, Sri Lanka and Nepal. Listed alphabetically by first name, regardless of surname:

==== Hindi ====
- Gopal Sharan, Umanga, on themes of patriotism and love of nature
- Mahadevi Varma, Nirja
- Rameshvar Shukla, Kiran Bela

==== Kashmiri ====
- Fazil Kashmiri, Saz-e-Chaman
- Mahjoor, "Nera Ha Sanyas Lagith", a poem published in a special number of Martand
- Man Ji Suri, Krishna Avtar, a masnavi on Krishna, but also including devotional lyrics in the vatsan form

==== Telugu ====
- Durbhaka Rajesekhara Satavadhani, Rana Pratapa Simha Caritra, called one of the "five modern epics", or Panca Kavya's in Telugu poetry; written in 5 cantos, with about 2,000 verses, in classical style, based on the Annals and Andiquities of Rajasthan by James Dodd
- Meka Ramachandra Appa Rao, translator, Amaruka, translation from English of Omar Khayyam's Rubbayit
- Tripurancni Ramaswami, Sutapuranam, poem criticizing Aryan mythologies; written in a classical style
- Pingali Lakshmikantam and Katuri Venkateshvara Rao, Saundaranandamu, epic in nine cantos, based on a Sanskrit poem by Asvagosha

==== Other Indian languages ====
- D. R. Bendre, also known as Ambikatanaya Datta, Murtu Mattu Kamakasturi, long, philosophical poem in 11 parts and 15 love songs; influenced by A.E.'s The Candle of Vision; Kannada
- Govinda Krishna Chettur, The Shadow of God, 37 sonnets in Kashmiri and a short prefatory poem in English; modeled on Alfred Lord Tennyson's In Memoriam
- Khavirakpan, Smaran mangal Kavya, humorous poems in Meitei
- Kirpa Sagar, Dido Jamval, epic on the actions of Maharaja Ranjit Singh in the Jammu area; Punjabi
- Masti Venkatesa Iyengar, Malara, a book that introduced the sonnet form into Kannada poetry; the 82 sonnets approach different subjects, including day-to-day life and the change of seasons, from a very religious point of view and in an uncomplicated, conversational style
- N. Balamani Amma, Amma, on a mother's love and a child's innocence; Malayalam
- Narayan Murlidhar Gupte, writing under the pen name "Bee", Phulanci Onjal ("Handful of Flowers"), showing the influence of Kesavsut; Marathi
- Pramathanath Bisi, Pracin Asami Haite, sonnets written from 1924 to 1927 from the most prolific published sonnet-writer in Bengali; a companion volume, Bracin Parasik Haite, was published in the late 1960s
- Umashankur Joshi, Gangotri, Gujarati-language
- Vinayak Damodar Savarkar, Savarakaranci Sphuta Kavita, including "Sagaras" ("To the Sea"), and patriotic poems such as "Maze Mrtypatra" ("My Will") and "Maranonmukh Sayyevar" ("Upon the death-bed"); by a Marathi revolutionary

=== Other languages ===
- Vladimir Cavarnali, Poesii (Poems)
- José Santos Chocano, Primicias de Oro de Indias, Peru
- Constantin S. Nicolăescu-Plopșor, Ghileà romanè (anthology)
- Martinus Nijhoff, Awater, Netherlands
- Alejandro Peralta, El Kollao, Peru
- Fernando Pessoa, Mensagem (Message), Portugal
- Heiti Talvik, Palavik (Fever), Estonia
- Ernst Volkman, ed., Deutsche Dichtung im Weltkrieg, Germany

== Awards and honors ==
- Pulitzer Prize for Poetry: Robert Hillyer: Collected Verse
- Queen's Gold Medal for Poetry: Laurence Whistler

== Births ==
Death years link to the corresponding "[year] in poetry" article:

- January 1 – Muthaffar al-Nawab (died 2022) Iraqi poet and political critic
- January 6 – John Wieners (died 2002), American lyric poet
- January 22 – Sugathakumari (died 2020), Indian Malayalam female poet and activist
- February 10 – Fleur Adcock (died 2024), expatriate New Zealand poet and editor who lives much of her life in England
- February 18 – Audre Lorde (died 1992), African-American writer, poet and activist
- February 27 – N. Scott Momaday (died 2024), Native American poet and writer
- March 31 – Kamala Surayya (died 2009), Indian poet and writer in English and Malayalam, her native language, Indian English
- March 20 – David Malouf (died 2026), Australian poet and writer
- April 11 – Mark Strand (died 2014), American poet
- April 12 – Anselm Hollo (died 2013), Finnish-American poet and translator also resident for eight years in the United Kingdom, where his poems are included in British poetry anthologies.
- May 10 – Jayne Cortez (died 2012), African-American poet
- June 15 – Hettie Jones, born Hettie Cohen (died 2024), American poet, writer and first wife of Amiri Baraka
- July 1 – James Liddy (died 2008), Irish American poet
- July 13 – Wole Soyinka, Nigerian writer, poet and playwright who in 1986 is the first African to win the Nobel Prize in Literature
- July 17 – Rainer Kirsch (died 2015), German writer and poet
- July 18 – Walt McDonald, American poet and academic
- July 20 – Henry Dumas (died 1968), African-American writer and poet
- August 5 – Wendell Berry, American novelist, essayist, poet, professor, cultural critic and farmer
- August 6 – Diane di Prima (died 2020), American poet associated with the Beats
- September 2 – Jack Agüeros (died 2014), American community activist, poet, writer and translator
- September 7 – Sunil Gangopadhyay (died 2012), Indian Bengali-language poet
- September 9 – Sonia Sanchez, African-American poet, playwright and children's book author associated with the Black Arts Movement
- September 21 – Leonard Cohen (died 2016), Canadian-born poet, singer-songwriter and novelist
- September 23 – M. Travis Lane, American-Canadian poet
- October 7 – Amiri Baraka, born LeRoi Jones (died 2014), African-American poet, playwright, essayist and music critic whose first wife is poet Hettie Jones
- November 7 – Beverly Dahlen, American poet
- November 15 – Ted Berrigan (died 1983), American poet and political activist
- November 19 – Joanne Kyger (died 2017), American poet
- November 25 – Shakti Chattopadhyay (died 1995), Bengali poet
- November 28 – Ted Walker (died 2004), English poet, short story writer, travel writer, television and radio dramatist and broadcaster
- December 17 – Binoy Majumdar (died 2006), Bengali poet
- December 29 – Forugh Farrokhzad (died 1967), Iranian poet and film director
- Also:
  - Muhammad al-Maghut (died 2006), Syrian Ismaili poet
  - Stephen Berg, American
  - Sugatha Kumari, Indian, Malayalam-language poet
  - Heather Spears, Canadian-born poet, novelist and artist

== Deaths ==
Birth years link to the corresponding "[year] in poetry" article:

- January 8 – Andrei Bely (born 1880), Russian novelist, poet and critic
- March 7 – Ernst Enno (born 1875), Estonian
- March 25 – Arthur Alfred Lynch (born 1861), Australian-born, Irish and British civil engineer, physician, journalist, author, soldier, anti-imperialist and polymath who served as a member of the House of Commons after being convicted of treason, sentenced to death, having his sentence reduced and then being released (for having recruited volunteers for the Boer side during the Boer War, in South Africa); towards the end of World War I raised his own Irish battalion
- June 14 – John Gray (born 1866), English
- July 4 – Hayim Nahman Bialik (born 1873), Hebrew
- August 19 – Jean Blewett (born 1862), Canadian
- September 26 – Inoue Kenkabō 井上剣花坊 pen name of Inoue Koichi (born 1870), late Meiji, Taishō and early Shōwa period Japanese journalist and writer of senryū (short, humorous verse) (surname: Inoue)
- December 3 – Catherine Pozzi (born 1882), French poet and woman of letters
- John Ferrar Holms (born 1897), British critic

== See also ==
- Poetry
- List of poetry awards
- List of years in poetry
