= Santosh Juvekar =

Indian film, television and stage actor (born 1984)

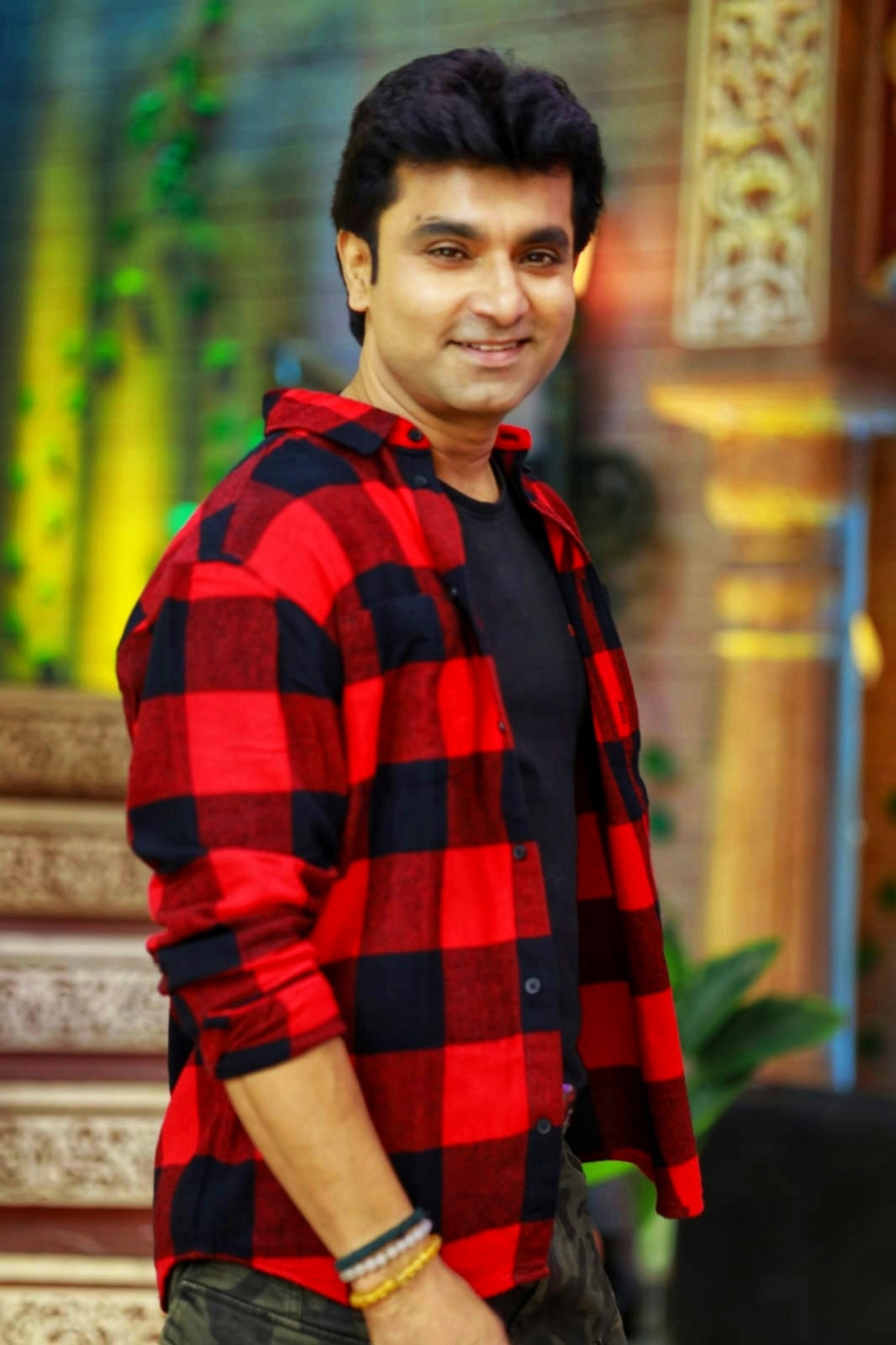
- Juvekar in 2024
- Born: 12 December 1984 (age 41); Gadhinglaj, Kolhapur, Maharashtra
- Education: SVPM, Kalwa
- Occupation: Actor
- Years active: 2004 – present

Santosh Juvekar is an Indian film, television and stage actor. Known for his work in Marathi films. He has also acted in Hindi films and Web series.

== Career ==
Juvekar started with his acting career in 2004 with the Marathi play Aani Makarand Rajadhyaksha playing the role Naren Deshmukh. Directed by Dilip Kolhatkar, the play had Vikram Gokhale in it. He soon started working in various television serials and became popular with the show Ya Gojirvanya Gharaat. His first film debut was through Rajiv Patil's film Blind Game in 2006. The film had a notable star cast of Anant Jog and Upendra Limaye in lead roles and actress Mukta Barve in a small role. He later played various roles as the main lead in films like Zenda, Morya, Matter and more. He also did a movie named 31December:The Mirror in which he played the role of Army officer. He got nominated for Gadbad Gondhal in Ambarnath Marathi Film Festival in 2017 as Best Actor. He also works in a web series known as Struggler Saala which is available on YouTube.

=== Marathi theatre ===
He commenced his acting career in 2004 with the Marathi play 'Aani Makarand Rajadhyaksha'. In this play, he played the role of Naren Deshmukh. Directed by Dilip Kolhatkar, the play co-starred Vikram Gokhale.

=== Marathi cinema ===
Santosh Juvekar is known for his brilliant performance in films like 'Zenda', Ek Tara, Shala, Fakt Ladh Mhana, Sanai Choughade, Date Bhet, 'Rege', 'Morya', and 'Sharyat'

His upcoming movies include 'Raanti' directed by Samit Kakkad who had directed 36 Gunn featuring Santosh Juvekar.

=== Hindi cinema ===
==== 2000–2009 ====
His first Hindi movie was Mumbai Meri Jaan a 2008 Indian drama film directed by Nishikant Kamat and produced by Ronnie Screwvala. It stars R. Madhavan, Irrfan Khan, Soha Ali Khan, Paresh Rawal and Kay Kay Menon. It deals with the aftermath of the 11 July 2006 Mumbai train bombings, where 209 people lost their lives and over 700 were injured. It won multiple Filmfare Awards including National Film Award for Best Special Effects in 2008.

==== 2010–2019 ====
In 2017, he starred in the movie Ascharya Fuck It (parsed as Ascharya F#*k It on the film's theatrical poster; also known as Ascharyachakit!) featuring alongside Priyanka Bose, Vaibhav Raj Gupta, Ankit Raj and Anangsha Biswas.

==== 2020–present ====
Santosh Juvekar will be seen in the upcoming film Chhava.

Santosh Juvekar was seen in Bhonsle released in 2020. He played the role of hostile Vilas, a taxi driver by night and an aspiring Marathi neta by day.

Juvekar played the role of Police Inspector in two movies: Darlings, released on Netflix in 2022, and Kuttey, released in 2023. He also played a role of Guddu in the movie Minus 31: The Nagpur Files.

== Filmography ==
=== Films ===
Key
†	Denotes films that have not yet been released

Year	Title	Role	Language
2004	Juiley	Vijay Deshmukh	Marathi
2006	Kadhi Achanak	Vishwas's Son	Marathi
2006	Blind Game	Gangster	Marathi
2006	Anandache Jhaad		Marathi
2007	Sakhi		Marathi
2008	Mumbai Meri Jaan	Ashok	Marathi
2008	Manya Sajjana	Baja	Marathi
2008	Sanai Choughade	Aditya	Marathi
2008	Picnic	Anurag	Marathi
2008	Guilty		Marathi
2009	Bedhundh	Panduranga Ghorpade (PADDY)	Marathi
2009	Chal Gammat Karu		Marathi
2010	Zenda	Santosh Shinde (Santya)	Marathi
2010	Ringa Ringa	Johnny	Marathi
2011	Sharyat	Sanjay	Marathi
2011	Pangira		Marathi
2011	Paash		Marathi
2011	Morya	Manoj Shinde (Manya)	Marathi
2011	Fakta Ladh Mhana	Salim	Marathi
2011	Shala	Manjrekar Sir	Marathi
2011	Shahanpan Dega Deva	Himesh	Marathi
2011	Pratibimb	Gauri's college friend	Marathi
2011	Raj Ka Ran		Marathi
2012	Gol Gol Dabyatla		Marathi
2012	Aayna Ka Bayna	Anchor	Marathi
2012	Jana Gana Mana	Dagdu	Marathi
2012	31 December	Naxalite	Marathi
2012	Matter	Pakya	Marathi
2012	Tendulkar Out	Nair	Marathi
2013	Rege	Mohanlal Yadav	Marathi
2014	Campus Katta	Raja Sidharth Shinde	Marathi
2014	Ek Tara	Dyaneshwar Lokhande (Mauli)	Marathi
2015	Black Home		Hindi
2015	Biker’s Adda	Vicky	Marathi
2016	Doctor Rakhmabai	Dadaji	Marathi
2016	Police Line Ek Purna Satya	Bala Desai	Marathi
2017	Boyz	Mandar	Marathi
2017	Gadad Jambhal	Amsha	Marathi
2018	Ranangan	Himself	Marathi
2018	Gadbad Gondhal	Saumitra Paranjape	Marathi
2018	Me Shivaji Park	Harish Vedant	Marathi
2019	Chatrapati Shasan	Ranjeet Dada Patil	Marathi
2019	Rocky	Sultan	Marathi
2019	Adham	Vicky	Marathi
2020	Bhonsle	Vilas Dhavle	Hindi
2022	Darlings	Inspector Janardhan Jadhav	Hindi
2022	36 Gunn	Sudhir	Marathi
2023	Kuttey	Police Inspector	Hindi
2023	Ravrambha	Jalindar	Marathi
2023	Date Bhet	Abhijeet	Marathi
2023	Minus 31: The Nagpur Files	Guddu	Hindi
2024	Raanti	Bala	Marathi
2024	Rukhwat	Amar, Jagannath (double role)	Marathi
2025	Chhaava	Rayaji Bandal	Hindi
2026	Mamachya Govyala Jauya	Santosh Juvekar	Marathi
2026	Veer Murarbaji †	TBA	Marathi Hindi

=== Television ===
Year	Title	Role	Language	Notes
2005	Police Panch		Marathi	
2006	Hya Gojirwanya Gharat	Shekhar Paranjpe	Marathi	
2006	Vadalvaat	Shailesh Kavishkar	Marathi	
2006	Oon Paaus	Raju Hari	Marathi	
2006	Bhumika		Marathi	
2006	Kimayagar		Marathi	
2012	Veig		Marathi	
2015-2017	Assa Sasar Surekh Baai	Yash Mahajan	Marathi	
2018	Year Down	Janmejay Naik	Marathi	
2020	Ek Thi Begum	Sawtya	Hindi	Series on MX Player
2021	Indori Ishq	Inspector Gaikwad	Hindi	Series on MX Player
2021	Hidden	Pradeep Raje	Hindi	Series on MX Player
2022	Dharavi Bank	Avinash Mhatre	Hindi	Series on MX Player

=== Web series ===
- In 2022 he acted in Dharavi Bank which starred actors like Sunil Shetty and Vivek Oberoi.
- He played the role of 'Sawtya' in 'Ek Thi Begum - An MX Original Series in 2021.

== Awards ==
Year	Award	Category	Work	Result	Ref.
2024	Sakal Premier Awards	Best Villain	Ravrambha	Won	
2023	Maharashtra State Film Awards	Best Supporting Actor	Ravrambha	Won	
2017	Maharashtra State Film Awards	Best Supporting Actor	Doctor Rakhmabai	Nominated	
2015	IMFFA Award (International Marathi Film Festival Awards)	Best Actor	Ek Tara	Won	
2010	MaTa Sanman Award (Maharashtra Times Awards)	Best Supporting Actor	Zenda	Won	
