= Pareeksha =

Pareeksha may refer to:

- Pareeksha (1967 film), an Indian Malayalam-language film
- Pareeksha (2020 film), an Indian Hindi-language film
