= Campus Katta =

2014 Marathi-language film

- Directed by: Sanjeev Kolte
- Produced by: Prathamesh Gadve
- Starring: Santosh Juvekar; Namrata Gaikwad; Sheetal Dabholkar; Swati Chitnis
- Cinematography: Jitendra Achrekar
- Music by: Pravin Kunvar
- Release date: 18 April 2014
- Country: India
- Language: Marathi

Campus Katta is an Indian Marathi language film directed by Sanjeev Kolte and produced by Prathamesh Gadve. The film stars Santosh Juvekar, Namrata Gaikwad and Sheetal Dabholkar, Swati Chitnis. Music by Pravin Kuvar. The film was released on 18 April 2014.

== Synopsis ==
College and youngsters as they fight corruption in their for-profit university.

== Cast ==
- Santosh Juvekar as Raja Sinde
- Namrata Gaikwad as Sakhi
- Sheetal Dabholkar as Rasika
- Swati Chitnis
- Arun Nalawade as Annasaheb Gunthe Patil
- Milind Shinde as Kolse Patil
- Rahulraj Dongre as Bhairav
- Vikram Gokhale as Principal Kocharekar
- Kishori Shahane

== Soundtrack ==
Campus Katta

Soundtrack album by Pravin Kuvar
- Released: 2014
- Recorded: 2014
- Genre: Feature film soundtrack
- Length: 9:44
- Language: Marathi

Official audio
- Campus Katta – Full Album on YouTube

Track listing
No.	Title	Singer(s)	Length
1.	"Holi"	Neha Rajpal, Anand Joshi, Adarsh Shinde	5:06
2.	"Ka Manala Aaj ( Sufi song)"	Javed Ali	4:38
Total length:			9:44

== Critical response ==
Campus Katta film received negative reviews from critics. A Reviewer of The Times of India gave the film 2.5 stars out of 5 and wrote "The actors carry the film on their able shoulders but the treatment given to it could have been better". Soumitra Pote of Maharashtra Times gave the film 2 stars out of 5 and wrote "While making a film with such talented actors, it is important to remember that their efforts should be justified. Otherwise, everything becomes a game of deception". A Reviewer of Divya Marathi wrote "It's campus katta with irrelevant scenes, pointless dialogues, artificial acting and stray subject matter and not even a single Katta".
