= Ascharya Fuck It =

- Poster
- Directed by: Samit Kakkad
- Written by: Amar Tipnis; Hrishikesh Kohli
- Starring: Priyanka Bose; Vaibhav Raj Gupta; Ankit Raaj; Anangsha Biswas; Santosh Juvekar
- Cinematography: R. Dee
- Release date: 14 December 2018
- Country: India
- Language: Hindi

Ascharya Fuck It (parsed as Ascharya F#*k It on the film's theatrical poster; also known as Ascharyachakit!) is an Indian Hindi language black comedy drama film, directed by Samit Kakkad. The film stars Priyanka Bose, Vaibhav Raj Gupta, Ankit Raaj, Anangsha Biswas and Santosh Juvekar in major roles. The story is about how desire and greed intertwine the lives of a Bollywood star, his chauffeur, a prostitute and her pimp in an unlikely love story. The film is backed by Yoodlee Films, a production venture of Saregama.

== Plot ==
A Bollywood Superstar hires a prostitute for a night of passion. This one night changes the fate of five characters forever. The prostitute falls for the Superstar's driver while she struggles to free herself from the clutches of the sociopath pimp. Meanwhile, the actor is blackmailed for his past transgressions and he seeks to keep his reputation intact by any means necessary. These two events collide with a violent conclusion where not everyone will survive.

== Cast ==
- Santosh Juvekar as Khushiya
- Priyanka Bose as Kanta
- Vaibhav Raj Gupta as Raju
- Ankit Raaj as Karan Kumar
- Vipin Sharma as Gordhan
- Anangsha Biswas as Latika
- Kashmira Irani as Janki
