= Samit Kakkad =

Indian filmmaker and director

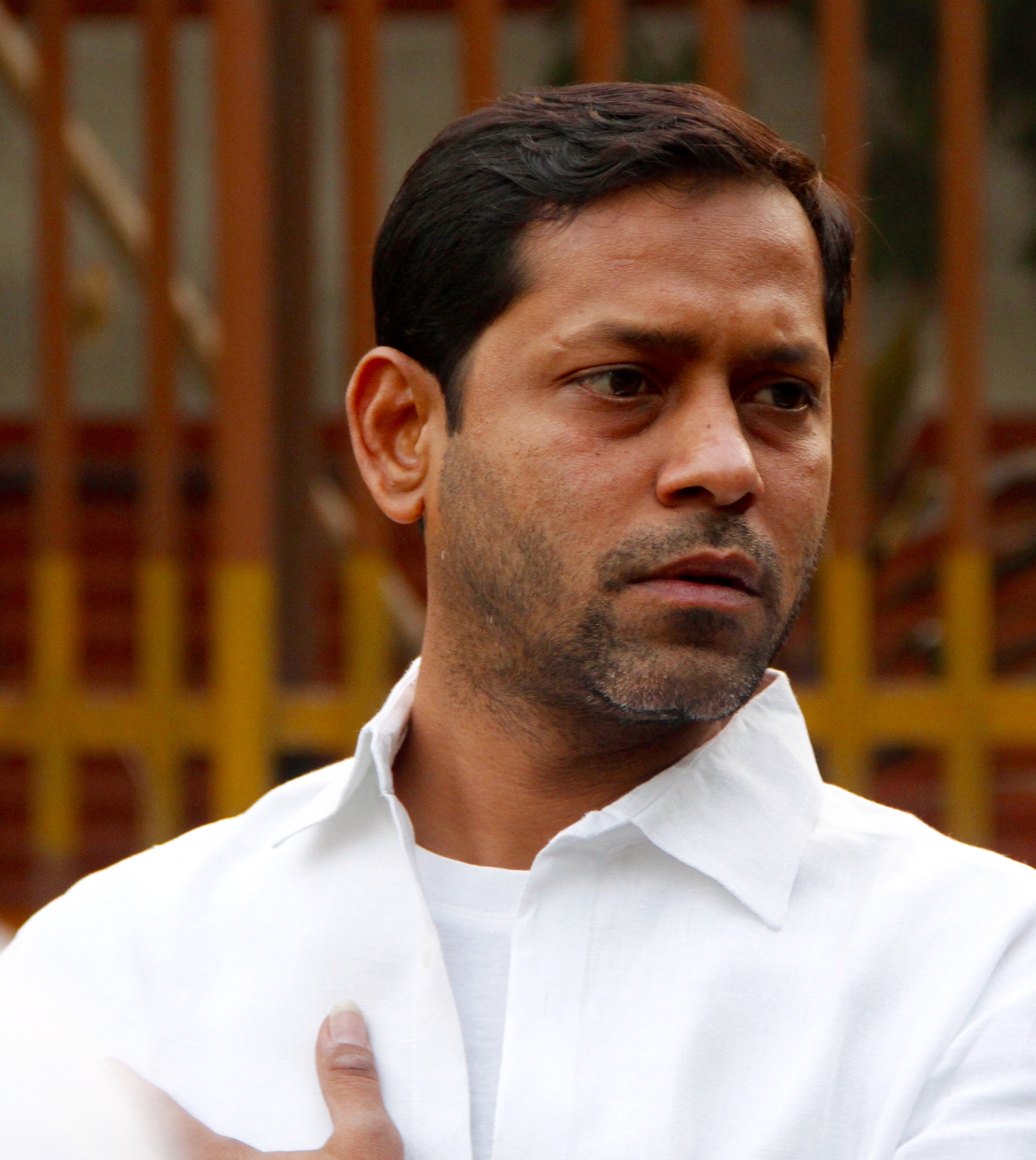
- Samit Kakkad
- Born: 11 October 1974 (age 51)
- Education: Don Bosco High School, Mumbai, Khalsa College, Mumbai
- Occupation: Film Producer - Director
- Relatives: Amar Kakkad (Father)
- Writing career
- Years active: 1998 - Present
- Notable works: Indori Ishq, Half Ticket, Aayna Ka Bayna, 36 Gunn, Dharavi Bank

Samit Kakkad is an Indian filmmaker and director. He is best known for directing Aayna Ka Bayna (2012) which was selected for 18 International film festivals and Half Ticket (2017) which won the Ecumenical Jury Award at the 57th Zlin International Film Festival 2017.

== Career ==
Samit was born in Mumbai to Ad/Corporate filmmaker Amar Kakkad. Keen on becoming a filmmaker too, he learnt his craft by reading cinema-specific books and assisting his father on documentaries and ad films. He started his career as an editor on TV shows and segued to assisting directors like Mahesh Manjrekar and Rahul Dholakia. Kakkad has stated that there is no better film school than a set and the post-production set up where one can learn how a story comes to life.

Using his experience as a line-producer, Kakkad stepped headlong into the entertainment arena as a producer and creative director with Huppa Huiyaa (2010). He turned director with his next production, the dance-based Aayna Ka Bayna (2012) which was selected to represent India at 18 International film festivals and chosen as the closing film of Toronto's Reel World Film Festival. The movie is the first Marathi film to be dubbed in Hindi for Sony Max.

Samit Kakkad's second film as a director was Half Ticket, an adaptation of the national award-winning Tamil film Kaaka Muttai. Half Ticket was telecast at 20 International Film Festivals and won the prestigious Ecumenical Jury Award at the 57th Zlin International Film Festival 2017 and was warmly received by critics. Hollywood Reporter called it a "predictable but satisfying Indian comedic drama."

Kakkad followed it with Ascharya Chak It (2017), his first directorial venture in Hindi, before making his debut in the OTT arena with the well-received web series Indori Ishq (2021). The commonality between all his films is the underbelly of Mumbai which the director has explored at length.

In 2022, he helmed the Marathi film 36 Gunn, which stars Santosh Juvekar, Purva Pawar, and Pushkar Shrotri. Kakkad also directed the Hindi web series Dharavi Bank, featuring Suniel Shetty and Vivek Oberoi. In 2024, he worked with Sharad Kelkar on the film Raanti, a remake of the Telugu movie Ugram. Raanti is set to release on November 22, 2024.

== Milestones ==
Kakkad's directorial debut Aayna Ka Bayna was screened extensively in the international festival circuit.

His second directorial venture Half Ticket won the Ecumenical Jury Award at the 57th Zlin International Film Festival 2017.

== Filmography ==
Year	Film	Director	Producer	Notes	Ref.
2010	Huppa Huiyya	No	Yes		
2012	Aayna Ka Bayna	Yes	Yes	Aayna Ka Bayna (Delinquent Dancers) International Film Festivals	
2016	Half Ticket	Yes	No	Half Ticket has been officially selected in 10 International Film Festivals all over the world.	
2019	Ascharya Chak It	Yes	No		
2021	Indori Ishq	Yes	Yes	Web series	
2022	36 Gunn	Yes	Yes		
2022	Dharavi Bank	Yes	No	Web series	
2024	Raanti	Yes	No		
