= Rucha Inamdar =

Indian actress

- Born: Mumbai, Maharashtra, India
- Occupation: Actress
- Years active: 2012–present

Rucha Inamdar is an Indian film actress who has appeared in several Hindi films. Her film career began with the Hindi feature films Children of War (2014) and Under the Same Sun (2015). In 2017, she made her commercial film debut in Ganesh Acharya's Marathi language film Bhikari, opposite Swwapnil Joshi, and Wedding Cha Shinema came next (2019).

Rucha made her digital web series debut in Criminal Justice as Avni. Her performance was universally praised. Rucha can be seen in the Hotstar Specials web series "The Great Indian Murder" as Ritu Rai. She has played a lead role in the movie Minus 31: The Nagpur Files.

She won Special Jury Award at the Ottawa Indian Film Festival for Not Today.

== Early life ==
Rucha had her upbringing in JJ Hospital campus, Mumbai and is a qualified dental surgeon. She completed her BDS degree from Maharashtra.

== Career ==
Rucha has also performed in 70-75 television commercials with superstars including Amitabh Bachchan, Aamir Khan, Shah Rukh Khan, Anil Kapoor, John Abraham and has been directed by renowned directors including Anurag Kashyap, Shoojit Sircar, Pradeep Sarkar, Gauri Shinde, Vinil Mathew, Ram Madhvani, Prasoon Pandey, Abhishek Verman, Anupam Mishra, Prakash Varma and many more. Rucha has a theater background and is a trained Kathak and Latin ballroom dancer.

== Filmography ==
| Year | Title | Role | Notes |
|---|---|---|---|
| 2014 | Children of War | Kausar | |
| 2015 | Under the Same Sun | Yasmeen | |
| 2017 | Bhikari | Madhu | |
| 2017 | Moh Dia Tandhaa | Manno | Short film |
| 2019 | Wedding Cha Shinema | Pari Pradhan | |
| 2019 | Criminal Justice | Avni Sharma Parashar | Hotstar Special |
| 2020 | Operation Parindey | SP Komal Bhardwaj | Cameo ZEE5 Original |
| 2020 | Seven Feet | Aanchal | Short film |
| 2021 | Not Today | Aliah Rupawala | |
| 2022 | The Great Indian Murder | Ritu Rai | Hotstar |
| 2023 | Minus 31: The Nagpur Files | Preksha Sharma | |
