= Theodor Benfey =

German philologist and scholar of Sanskrit

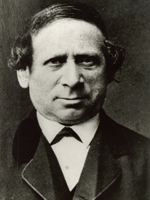
- Born: 28 January 1809; Nörten-Hardenberg
- Died: 26 June 1881 (aged 72); Göttingen
- Occupation: philologist

This is about the German philologist. For Theodor Benfey (born 1925) who developed a spiral periodic table of the elements in 1964, see Otto Theodor Benfey.

Theodor Benfey (German: [ˈteːodoːɐ̯ ˈbɛnfaɪ]; 28 January 1809, in Nörten near Göttingen – 26 June 1881, in Göttingen) was a German philologist and scholar of Sanskrit. His works, particularly his Sanskrit-English dictionary, formed a major contribution to Sanskrit studies.

== Early life and education ==
Benfey was born into a Jewish family in the small town of Nörten, near the city of Göttingen in Lower Saxony. He was born during the political upheaval of the Napoleonic Wars, when Lower Saxony was occupied by the French Army (1806–1814). His father, Isaak Benfey (died 1832), was a merchant and Talmud scholar, and the family had 8 children. In 1810, when Theodor was one year old, the family relocated to Göttingen. The French occupation ended when Benfey was 5, and Gottingen, which belonged to the Electorate of Hanover, became part of the Kingdom of Hanover, then ruled over by the British House of Hanover (1814–66). Most of Benfey's childhood and youth was lived during the post-war period, which was marked by economic impoverishment and political oppression of nationalists and liberals. Benfey attended secondary school at the Gottingen gymnasium, and was tutored in Hebrew by his father Isaak.

Theodor showed exceptional talent for languages, and the Hebrew he studied with his father gave him a taste for philology. At the age of 16, Benfey began studies at the University of Göttingen, where he studied Greek and Latin languages under Ludolf Dissen and Otfried Müller. In 1827, he travelled to Munich, where he studied under Friedrich Wilhelm Thiersch. He returned to Göttingen, where he defended his thesis titled De Liguris. His defense was successful and he was granted his Ph.D. at the age of 19. He immediately began working towards a university teaching license. In 1830, he successfully presented his dissertation, Observationes ad Anacreontis Fragmenta Genuina, and was granted a venia legendi, or license to teach university courses.

== Career ==
Benfey began his teaching career that year in the city of Frankfurt, where he worked and lived for two years. He then took up a position in Heidelberg, where he remained for two years as well. These were to be the last paid teaching position that Benfey would have for nearly 14 years. In 1834, he returned to his home-town of Göttingen, where he took up a position at his alma mater, the University of Göttingen. He worked at the university as a privat-docent, a lecturer who is unpaid and untenured. It is likely that he lived with family during this time, as he had no means of income for quite some time. He searched unsuccessfully for paid work, even looking so far as France.

Initially, Benfey lectured in classical languages such as Greek and Latin, which had been the subject of his university studies and Ph.D. dissertation. While teaching in Frankfurt, he published his first book, a translation of the comedies of the Roman playwright Terence. During his first few years lecturing at the University of Gottingen, he had also begun work on a lexicon of Greek roots. It was actually by chance that Benfey was first introduced to Sanskrit: There was a wager made that Benfey could not teach himself Sanskrit in time to review a new translation of a Sanskrit book, in a mere 4 weeks. But Benfey did manage and was able to review the Latin-Sanskrit edition of the Markandeya Purana for an academic journal. This feat of learning is made all the more impressive by the fact that the only books on Sanskrit available at the time were H. H. Wilson's Sanskrit-English Dictionary, and Monier Monier-Williams's Sanskrit grammar, neither of which were particularly helpful, as they only superficially covered Vedic Sanskrit. The subject matter he lectured on began to broaden, and in 1836, he collaborated on Über die Monatsnamen einiger alten Völker (Month Names of Ancient Peoples) with his friend Moritz A. Stern, a Jewish mathematician who also taught at the University of Gottingen. This work demonstrated the Hebrew month-names are derived from Persian. In 1839, he also wrote an article on India for Ersch and Gruber's Allgemeine Encyclopädie der Wissenschaften und Künste ("Universal Encyclopaedia of Sciences and Arts").

In 1839, Benfey published his first major work, his Griechisches Wurzellexikon (Lexicon of Greek Roots). This work brought him degree of financial and professional success, and enabled him to marry Fanny Wallenstein in 1840. In 1842, The Institut de France awarded Benfey the prix Volney for his Lexicon, which brought him international recognition in the world of philology and comparative languages. By this time, Benfey had been working at the University of Gottingen as an unpaid privet-docent for over 8 years, and despite his experience and publications, he had never been granted a paid position. Younger, less accomplished lecturers were promoted and hired ahead of him, leading many to believe that this was a purposeful snub, and a display of prejudice against Benfey's Jewish religion and heritage. When the university's snub became more widely known, it sparked an international controversy, and the university was subsequently shamed into offering him a tenured position. Instrumental in securing Benfey a position was Alexander von Humboldt, a famous 19th century naturalist and explorer, who was particularly close to the Prussian monarch Frederick William IV. Alexander's brother Wilhelm von Humboldt had also been an accomplished linguist, and had recently died. Alexander showed religious tolerance towards Judaism, and petitioned the University for a tenured position on Benfey's behalf.

The much-deserved promotion to a paid, entry-level "assistant-professor" (Professor extraordinarius) did not come until 1848, and only when Benfey and his family had converted from Judaism to Protestant Christianity. It has been surmised that Benfey's conversion was not sincere, and that was made mainly for social advantages.

From this time Benfey's attention was principally given to Sanskrit. In 1848 he became an assistant professor, and published his edition of the Samaveda; in 1852–1854 his Handbuch der Sanskritsprache ("Manual of Sanskrit"), comprising a grammar and chrestomathy; in 1858 his practical Sanskrit grammar, afterwards translated into English; and in 1859 his edition of the Panchatantra, with an extensive dissertation on the fables and mythologies of primitive nations. All these works had been produced under the pressure of poverty, the government, whether from parsimony or from prejudice against a Jew, refusing to make any substantial addition to his small salary as an assistant professor at the university.

At length, in 1862, the growing appreciation of foreign scholars shamed it into making him a full professor, and in 1866 Benfey published the laborious work by which he is on the whole best known, his great Sanskrit-English Dictionary. In 1869 he wrote a history of German philological research, especially Oriental, during the 19th century. In 1878 his jubilee (50th anniversary) as doctor was celebrated by the publication of a volume of philological essays dedicated to him and written by the top scholars in Germany. He had designed to close his literary labours by a grammar of Vedic Sanskrit, and was actively preparing it when he was interrupted by illness, which terminated in his death at Göttingen.

== Legacy ==
Among his pupils was James Murdoch. Some of his ideas were developed in Russia by Fyodor Buslaev.

== Works (titles translated into English) ==
Selected works:

- De Liguris, 1828, Ph.D. thesis.
- Observationes ad Anacreontis Fragmenta Genuina (Observations on Anacreontis and Genuine Fragments), 1830. Venia Legendi dissertation.
- Über die Monatsnamen einiger alten Völker (Month Names of Ancient Peoples), 1836, in collaboration with Moritz A. Stern.
- Griechisches Wurzellexikon (Lexicon of Greek Roots), 1839.
- Über das Verhältniss der ägyptischen Sprache zum semitischen Sprachstamm (On the relationship of the Egyptian language to the Semitic language group), 1844
- The Cuneiform Inscriptions, 1847.
- The Hymns of Sama-Veda, 1848.
- The History of Oriental Philosophy in Germany, 1868.
- A Practical Grammar of the Sanskrit Language for the Use of Early Students, 1868.
- A Sanskrit-English Dictionary: With References to the Best Edition of Sanskrit Author and Etymologies and Comparisons of Cognate Words Chiefly in Greek, Latin, Gothic and Anglo-Saxon, 1866.

== Bibliography ==
- Willibald Kirfel (1955), Benfey, Theodor, in: Neue Deutsche Biographie (NDB), vol. 2, Berlin: Duncker & Humblot. ISBN 3-428-00183-4, p. 46
- Adalbert Bezzenberger (1902), Benfey, Theodor. In: Allgemeine Deutsche Biographie, vol. 46, Leipzig: Duncker & Humblot, p. 358
- Renate Heuer (ed.) (1993), Lexikon deutsch-jüdischer Autoren, vol. 2, München: Saur, pp. 31–50
