= Wedding Cha Shinema =

- Wedding Cha Shinema poster
- Wedding Cha Shinema
- Directed by: Saleel Kulkarni
- Written by: Saleel Kulkarni
- Screenplay by: Nihar Shantanu Bhave
- Story by: Saleel Kulkarni
- Produced by: Saleel Kulkarni
- Starring: Mukta Barve, Bhalchandra Kadam, Shivaji Satam
- Cinematography: Abhijit Abde
- Edited by: Abhijit Deshpande
- Music by: Saleel Kulkarni
- Production companies: Gerua Productions and PESB
- Distributed by: Everest Entertainment
- Release date: 12 April 2019 (India)
- Running time: 137 minutes
- Country: India
- Language: Marathi

Wedding Cha Shinema is a 2019 Indian Marathi language comedy drama film directed by Milind Lele and written by Saleel Kulkarni. Produced by Saleel Kulkarni, the film stars Mukta Barve as Urvi, an aspiring filmmaker, who wants to make films on serious topics. The film has Shivaji Satam, Bhalchandra Kadam, Shivraj Waichal, Rucha Inamdar, Pravin Tarde, Alka Kubal, Sunil Barve, Ashwini Kalsekar, Sankarshan Karhade, Prajakta Hanamgar, Yogini Pofale, Pranit Kulkarni, Tyagraj Khadilkar and Adesh Aawre.

Produced by Gerua Productions and PESB, and distributed by Everest Entertainment the film was released on 12 April 2019. The film score and soundtrack album are composed by Saleel Kulkarni and cinematography by Abhijit Abde and the editing is done by Abhijit Deshpande.

== Plot ==
A young Mumbai girl, Urvi (Mukta Barve) aspiring to be a filmmaker and looking to make it big, is unexpectedly allocated the job of directing pre-wedding and wedding festivities in a small village, in Western Maharashtra. The story goes through the fun and cheerful pre-wedding shoot before the couple "much in love" realizes the compromises and adjustments that would come with the marriage What follows is confusion and chaos sprinkled with emotional highs and lows, in the midst of wedding preparations. All the characters in the movie are simple sincere and have no animosity. A light-hearted family comedy, depicting how people living in metropolitan and big cities view interpersonal relationships in comparison with those in smaller towns, yet the fundamental values and feelings of concern, compromise, affection stay universal.

== Cast ==
- Shivraj Waichal as Prakash Shahane (Balu)
- Rucha Inamdar as Dr. Pari Pradhan
- Mukta Barve as Urvi
- Purnima Ahire as Manjari
- Adesh Aware as Dhagya
- Sunil Barve as Dr. Sameer Pradhan
- Prajakta Hanamghar as Kaplana (Kalpi)
- Bhalchandra Kadam as Madan
- Ashwini Kalsekar as Dr. Anagha Pradhan
- Sankarshan Karhade as Dilip Shahane
- Tyagraj Khadilkar as Jumbo (Jamubwanth Joshi)
- Alka Kubalas Prakash's Mother
- Pranit Kulkarni as Kalpana 's Husband
- Tushar Pandit as Mulicha Mama
- Yogini Pophale as Surekha Shahane
- Shivaji Satam as Appa Shahane
- Shreyas Talpade as Abhi
- Pravin Tarde as Mak (Makrandh)

== Soundtrack ==
Wedding Cha Shinema

Soundtrack album by Saleel Kulkarni
- Released: 11 February 2019
- Recorded: 2019
- Venue: India
- Studio: Everest Entertainment Pvt. Ltd.
- Genre: Feature film soundtrack
- Label: Everest Entertainment Pvt. Ltd.
- Producer: Saleel Kulkarni

The soundtrack and background score were composed by Saleel Kulkarni, with lyrics penned by Anup Pawar, Saleel Kulkarni and Sandeep Khare. The soundtrack has in total 6 songs released by Everest Entertainment Pvt. Ltd. on 11 February 2019 and produced by Gerua Productions and PESB. Saurabh Shirsath, Swaroopa Barve, Amita Ghugari, Saleel Kulkarni, Aditya Athalye, Adarsh Shinde, Vaishali Mhade, Shubhankar Kulkarni, Prasenjeet Kosambi, Aarya Ambekar, Saleel Kulkarni and Avdhoot Gupte have sung in the film.

Track listing
No.	Title	Singer(s)	Length
1.	"Bol Pakya"	Avadhoot Gupte	2:53
2.	"Ugichach Kay Bhandaychay"	Saleel Kulkarni	2:40
3.	"Mazya Mamachya Lagnala"	Shubhankar Kulkarni, Prasenjeet Kosambi, Aarya Ambekar	3:02
4.	"Aai Tuljabhavani"	Adarsh Shinde, Vaishali Mhade	4:42
5.	"Wedding Cha Shinema Kadha"	Saurabh Shirsath, Swaroopa Barve	3:14
6.	"Ding Ding"	Amita Ghugari, Saleel Kulkarni, Aditya Athalye	1:27
Total length:			15:58
