= 36 Gunn =

- Directed by: Samit Kakkad
- Starring: Santosh Juvekar; Vijay Patkar; Purva Pawar; Pushkar Shrotri
- Cinematography: Sujit Kumar
- Edited by: Ashish Mhatre; Apurva Motiwale Sahai
- Music by: Ajit Parab
- Release date: 4 November 2022
- Country: India
- Language: Marathi

36 Gunn is an Indian Marathi language film directed by Samit Kakkad. The film stars Santosh Juvekar, Vijay Patkar, Purva Pawar and Pushkar Shrotri. Music by Ajit Parab. The film was released on 4 November 2022.

== Cast ==
- Santosh Juvekar as Sudhir
- Purva Pawar as Kriya
- Vaibhav Raj Gupta as Fardeen
- Pushkar Shrotri as Marriage counsellor Godbole
- Vijay Patkar as Nanu
- Swati Bovalekar as Sudhir's grandmother

== Production ==
Principal photography began on 10 January 2019.

== Soundtrack ==
36 Gunn

Soundtrack album by Ajit Parab
- Released: 2022
- Recorded: 2022
- Genre: Feature film soundtrack
- Length: 8:02
- Language: Marathi

Official audio
- 36 Gunn – Full Album on YouTube

Track listing
No.	Title	Singer(s)	Length
1.	"Durava Daldal"	Jaydeep Vaidya	5:04
2.	"36 Gunn"	Harshavardhan Wavare	2:58
Total length:			8:02

== Critical response ==
36 Gunn film received positive reviews from critics. Mihir Bhanage of The Times of India gave the film 3 stars out of 5 and wrote "36 Gunn is a decent watch for the young audience. With a better climax and crisper editing, this one would've been even better". Aarti Vilas Borade of Hindustan Times gave the film 3.5 stars out of 5 and wrote "Overall 36 Gunn this film will feel close to today's audience". KalpeshRaj Kubal of Maharashtra Times gave the film 3 stars out of 5 and wrote "There is a kind of 'feel good factor' in this movie. The newly married couple and those who want to get married should watch this movie '36 Gunn'."
