= Half Ticket (2016 film) =

- Directed by: Samit Kakkad
- Screenplay by: Dnyanesh Zoting
- Story by: M. Manikandan
- Produced by: Nanu Jaisinghani; Suresh Jaisinghani; Mohit Jaisinghani
- Starring: Bhalchandra Kadam; Priyanka Bose Kamat; Shubham More; Vinayak Potdar; Usha Naik; Jaywant Wadkar; Shashank Shende; Shrikant Yadav; Kailash Waghmare; Nitin Bhodhare; Anuya Baiche; Santosh Kanekar
- Cinematography: Sanjay K. Memane
- Edited by: Faisal Mahadik; Imran Mahadik
- Music by: Score: Troy Arif; Songs: G. V. Prakash Kumar
- Production company: Video Palace
- Distributed by: Fox Star Studios
- Release date: July 22, 2016
- Running time: 112 minutes
- Country: India
- Language: Marathi

Half Ticket is a 2016 Indian Marathi language film directed by Samit Kakkad and produced by Nanu Jaisinghani, Suresh Jaisinghani and Mohit Jaisinghani. The film is the story of two slum boy brothers and their absolute focus to get what they cannot dare dream of. It is an official remake of the Tamil film Kaaka Muttai produced by Dhanush and Vetrimaaran. Film was released on 22 July 2016. Half Ticket was selected for the Indiwood Panorama Competition section at the 2nd edition of Indiwood Carnival 2016 in Hyderabad. At the 57th Zlin International Film Festival 2017 held in the Czech Republic, Half Ticket won the Ecumenical Jury Award.

== Cast ==
- Bhalchandra Kadam
- Priyanka Bose Kamat
- Shubham More
- Vinayak Potdar
- Usha Naik
- Jaywant Wadkar
- Shashank Shende
- Shrikant Yadav
- Kailash Waghmare
- Nitin Bhodhare
- Anuya Baiche
- Santosh Kanekar
- Dinesh Shetty
- Ankush Chaudhari as himself

== Soundtrack ==
Half Ticket

Soundtrack album by G. V. Prakash Kumar
- Released: 26 July 2016
- Genre: Feature film soundtrack
- Length: 18:05
- Language: Marathi
- Label: Video Palace

G. V. Prakash Kumar chronology
Meendum Oru Kadhal Kadhai (2016)	Half Ticket (2016)	Kadavul Irukaan Kumaru (2016)
External audio
- Audio Jukebox on YouTube

Music for this film is composed by G. V. Prakash Kumar while lyrics are penned by Kshitij Patwardhan. All songs were reused from the original.

Tracklist
No.	Title	Singer(s)	Length
1.	"Chal Chal Chal Chal"	Harshwardhan Wavare	05:15
2.	"Rubaab Pahije"	Harshwardhan Wavare	03:26
3.	"Labbad Gabbad"	Harshwardhan Wavare & Aditya Patekar	04:48
4.	"Bharle Re"	Karan Wavare	04:36
Total length:			18:05

== Reception ==
=== Critical reception ===
Mihir Bhanage of The Times of India gave the film a rating of 3 out of 5 saying that, "'Half Ticket' subtly brings forth a lot of issues like the rich-poor divide, opportunism and it does so effortlessly. The movie is unnecessarily stretched in some parts but nevertheless, it's definitely worth a watch." Justin Lowe of The Hollywood Reporter praised the performances of the child actors Shubham More and Vinayak Potdar and said that, "The young actors excel at replicating mischievous behavior, marginally sacrificing credibility in more dramatic scenes, but overall carrying the movie remarkably well for their age." Jason Pirodsky of The Prague Reporter gave the film a rating of 3 out of 5 and said that, "Half Ticket is a terrific story and a real crowd pleaser, though there's a dose of soapy sentimentality toward the finale." Jay Horton of Willamette Week gave the film a rating of 3 out of 5 saying that, "Sanjay Memane's buoyant camera work lopes through the Mumbai tenements with a kinetic vibrancy that propels forward the boys' quest with stirring grace and infectious enthusiasm." Ajay Kulye of Marathi Cineyug gave the film a rating of 4 out of 5 and praised the acting performances, music and camerawork and concluded his review by saying that, "Half Ticket is one gem of a film." Ganesh Matkari of Pune Mirror gave the film a rating of 3.5 out of 5 and said that, "Half Ticket is like a fable, which ends on a positive note, but gives us a lot to think about. I believe the film has a repeat viewing value due to its rich content, and the film should reveal more after each viewing."
