= James Murdoch (Scottish Orientalist) =

British journalist and academic (1856–1921)

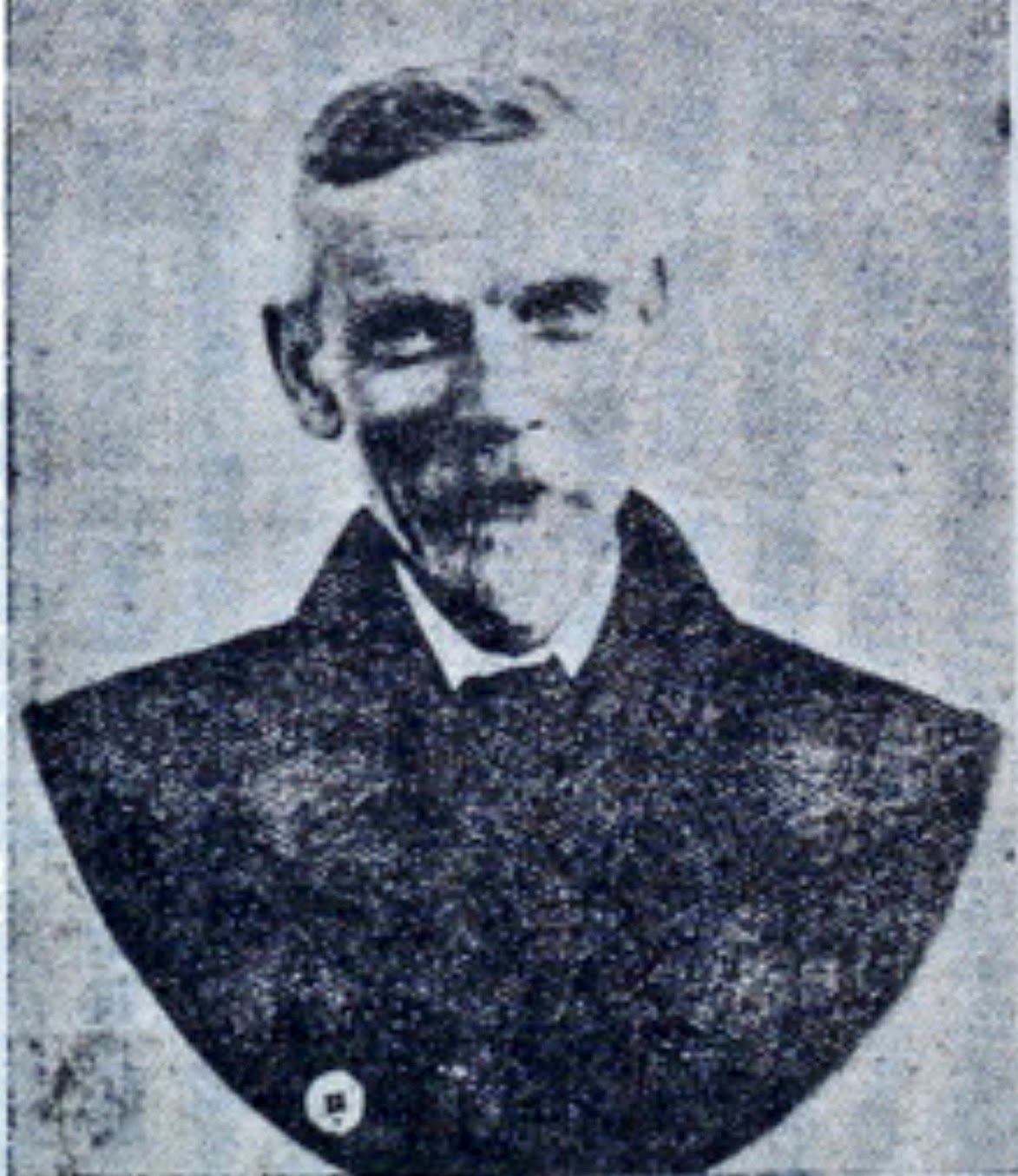
- Born: 27 September 1856; Stonehaven, Scotland
- Died: 30 October 1921 (aged 65); Baulkham Hills, New South Wales, Australia
- Education: University of Aberdeen
- Occupations: Orientalist, journalist, educator, historian

James Murdoch (27 September 1856 – 30 October 1921) was a Scottish Orientalist scholar and journalist, who worked as a teacher in the Empire of Japan and Australia. From 1903 to 1917, he wrote his "monumental" three-volume A History of Japan, the first comprehensive history of Japan in the English language (the third volume being published posthumously in 1926). In 1917 he began teaching Japanese at the University of Sydney and in 1918 he was appointed the foundation professor of the School of Oriental Studies there.

== Early life ==
James Murdoch was born in the Kirktown of Fetteresso, a village on the outskirts of Stonehaven, near Aberdeen, Scotland. His parents were William Murdoch, a labourer, and his wife Helen, née McDonald.

He exhibited signs of intellectual brilliance as a child, and although his family was of moderate means, he won a scholarship to Aberdeen University where he completed a bachelor's and master's degree. He subsequently studied at Worcester College, Oxford University, the University of Göttingen (where he studied Sanskrit under Theodor Benfey), and the University of Paris. In June 1860 he took up a post as assistant to the professor of Greek at Aberdeen.

Regarded as a genius in foreign languages, at the age of 24, he suddenly resigned from his post and decided to emigrate to Australia.

== Life in Australia ==
Murdoch taught in Queensland, Australia in the years 1881–1889. His first appointment was as the headmaster of the new Maryborough Boys Grammar School. He had been chosen from among 130 applicants for the position but became unpopular with the trustees (possibly because of his atheism), and he was dismissed in March 1885. He worked for the next two years as assistant master at Brisbane Grammar School. In 1886, he also sat for the Bar examinations but failed in two of the eight papers because he had mistakenly attempted to answer every question. He left the school at his own wish and became a journalist at the radical nationalist newspaper, The Boomerang. In a series of articles, he predicted that within a generation the Australian colonies would form an independent republic, which would turn socialist through a violent revolution unless the harsh living conditions of the working classes were alleviated.

== Life in Japan ==
Murdoch came to Japan as a foreign advisor, from September 1889 – 1893 as a professor of European history at the First Higher School, an elite institution for young men entering the Tokyo Imperial University. His most famous student during his first period in Japan was Natsume Sōseki.

In addition to teaching, he vigorously pursued literary activities. In June 1890 he published a long piece of satirical verse, Don Juan's Grandson in Japan. In November he launched a weekly magazine, the Japan Echo, which lasted for six issues. In 1892 he published From Australia and Japan (a volume of short stories which went through three editions) and a novel, Ayame-san. His stories were romances in which the heroes tended to be academic and sporting paragons with socialist political leanings, whereas the women were both mercenary and cruel, or paragons of erudition, beauty and good breeding. He also wrote several texts for pictorial guidebooks aimed at historically minded tourists, and edited the memoirs of Hikozo Hamada, the castaway who became the first Japanese to acquire American citizenship.

== Life in Paraguay and London ==
In August 1893, Murdoch left Japan to join the New Australia communist experimental commune in Paraguay (the commune had been founded by William Lane who had also founded The Boomerang). On 1 September, he was reported to be in London, on his way to New Australia to organize the schools there. By the time of his arrival, however, about one-third of the colonists had seceded, and far from the socialist paradise he had imagined, he found only poverty, dissention, and disease. He remained only a few days and, leaving his 12-year-old son Kenneth in South America, returned to London in ill health.

He spent the next five months recuperating at the British Museum, translating the letters of sixteenth-century European religious in Japan; he then returned to Japan, where he would live until 1917.

== Return to Japan ==
From 1894 to 1897 Murdoch taught English at the Fourth Higher School (today's Kanazawa University) at Kanazawa, Ishikawa prefecture. On 23 November 1899, while teaching economic history at the Higher Commercial College (today's Hitotsubashi University) in Tokyo, he married Takeko Okada.

In 1901 Murdoch moved to the Seventh Higher School at Kagoshima, Kyūshū. He had never fully recovered from the illness he had contracted in South America and he hoped to benefit from the milder Kyūshū winters. A History of Japan During the Century of Early Foreign Intercourse (1542–1651) appeared in 1903. The European language sources in Latin, Spanish, French and Dutch were all translated by himself. Lafcadio Hearn praised the book in the "Bibliographical Notes" section of his book Japan: An Attempt at Interpretation (1904).

In 1908, Murdoch's teaching contract was not renewed. Murdoch, nevertheless, decided to remain at Kagoshima. He contributed regularly to the Kobe Chronicle newspaper and, to supplement this income, planted a citron orchard. Although he was never to achieve fluency in speech, he had now become so proficient in classical written Japanese that he no longer had to rely on assistants. A History of Japan From the Origins to the Arrival of the Portuguese in 1542 A.D. appeared in 1910. In 1915, following the completion of the manuscript of the third volume, The Tokugawa Epoch 1652–1868, poverty forced Murdoch back into teaching, this time at the junior high-school level.

== Return to Australia ==
In February 1917, however, Murdoch was able to return to Australia to teach Japanese at the Royal Military College, Duntroon, and at the University of Sydney (where he founded the Japanese studies program), concurrent appointments instituted on the initiative of the Australian Defense Department. The following year, in response to an effort made by Waseda University to bring him back to Japan, the University of Sydney raised his status to that of a fully tenured professor and as the founding professor of the Chair of Oriental Studies. In return for £600 a year from the Defense Department, the university also permitted Murdoch to visit Japan annually to obtain first-hand information on shifts in Japanese public opinion and foreign policy. The first such visit resulted in a memorandum highly critical of Australia's intransigence on the racial equality issue raised by Japan at the Paris Peace Conference. Similarly, two years later Murdoch was called to Melbourne to give the Prime Minister of Australia his views on the renewal of the Anglo-Japanese Alliance.

Murdoch died of liver cancer at his home at Baulkham Hills on 30 October 1921. He had just completed the research for the fourth volume of the A History of Japan but had not begun writing. He was survived by his son (in South America) and by his wife (who returned to Japan). His successor in the Chair of Oriental Studies was Arthur Lindsay Sadler.

== James Murdoch prize ==
The University of Sydney gives an annual award, the James Murdoch Prize for Japanese 4, to high-achieving students in Japanese.

== Selected works ==
In an overview of writings by and about Murdoch, OCLC/WorldCat lists roughly 60+ works in 130+ publications in 4 languages and 1,300+ library holdings.

- A History of Constitutional Reform in Great Britain and Ireland : With Full Account of the Three Great Measures of 1832, 1867 and 1884, Glasgow: Blackie & Son, 1885
- The Narrative of a Japanese : What he has Seen and the People he has Met in the Course of the Last Forty Years, 1890; Tokyo: Maruzen, 1895; San Francisco: American-Japanese Publishing Association, n.d. (with Joseph Heco)
- Don Juan’s Grandson in Japan, with Notes for the Globe-Trotter’s Benefit, A. Miall (pseudonym of James Murdoch), Tokyo: Hakubunsha, 1890
- The Nikkō District, Yokohama: Kelly & Walsh, ca. 1890
- Ayame-san : A Japanese Romance of the 23rd year of Meiji (1890), Yokohama, etc.: Kelly & Walsh, 1892; London: Walter Scott, 1892 (with photographic illustrations by W. K. Burton (William Kinnimond Burton) et al.)
- Felix Holt Secundus, and, A Tosa Monogatari of Modern Times, Allahabad: A.H. Wheeler & Co., ca. 1892-93 (Indian Railway Library, no. 18)
- From Australia and Japan, London: Walter Scott, 1892; republished as: A Yoshiwara Episode. Fred Wilson's Fate., Allahabad: A.H. Wheeler & Co., 1894 (Indian Railway Library, no. 22); also republished as: Tales of Australia and Japan, Melbourne: E. W. Cole, 1892.
- Scenes from the Chiushingura and the Story of the Forty-Seven Rōnin... With descriptive text by James Murdoch, 1893
- A History of Japan, Kobe: Kobe Chronicle, 1903 (for later volumes, see section below)
- Scenes from Open Air Life in Japan, publisher and place of publication not identified, 1910 (with W. K. Burton)

=== A History of Japan ===
References to volume numbers can be confusing, as the books were later issued in sets where volume number does not correspond to order of original publication.

- During the Century of Early Foreign Intercourse (1542–1651), in collaboration with Isoh Yamagata, published by the Kobe Chronicle, Kobe, Japan, 1903. This was Vol. II in the Routledge set.
- From the Origins to the Arrival of the Portuguese in 1542 A.D., published 1910 by Trench, Trubner, & Co. Note that this was labelled Vol. 1, and was Vol. I in the Routledge set.
- The Tokugawa Epoch 1652–1868, published 1926.

== See also ==
- Anglo-Japanese relations
- E. E. Speight
