= Agra (2023 film) =

2023 Indian drama film

- Official poster
- Directed by: Kanu Behl
- Written by: Atika Chohan; Kanu Behl
- Produced by: Vikram Mehra; Siddarth Anand Kumar; William Jéhannin; Kanu Behl
- Starring: Mohit Agarwal; Priyanka Bose; Rahul Roy; Adhiraj Sharma; Devas Dikshit; Vibha Chibber
- Cinematography: Saurabh Monga
- Edited by: Samarth Dixit; Nitesh Bhatia
- Music by: Karan Gour
- Production companies: Saregama India Ltd; UFO Production; O28 Films
- Distributed by: Les Films de l'Atalante
- Release dates: 24 May 2023 (Cannes); 14 November 2025 (India)
- Running time: 132 minutes
- Country: India
- Language: Hindi

Agra (/ˈɑːɡrə/, Hindustani: [ˈaːgraː]) is a 2023 Indian Hindi-language erotic psychological drama film co-written and directed by Kanu Behl. It features debutant Mohit Agarwal, Priyanka Bose, Rahul Roy, Adhiraj Sharma, Devas Dikshit, Ruhani Sharma, Vibha Chibber, Sonal Jha, and Aanchal Goswami in pivotal roles. The film follows Guru, a young single call center employee who still lives with his parents. Consumed by frustration, he plunges into a fever bordering on insanity, between pathetic fantasies, dating apps and hysterical self-harm.

It premiered at the 2023 Cannes Film Festival Directors' Fortnight on 24 May 2023 with the description, "Agra grasps the so called reality of patriarchy in India through the prism of male sexual misery".

It was released theatrically in India on 14 November 2025.

== Cast ==
- Mohit Agarwal as Guru
- Priyanka Bose as Priti
- Ruhani Sharma as Mala
- Rahul Roy as Guru's daddy
- Devas Dikshit as Sundar
- Vibha Chibber as Guru's mummy
- Sonal Jha as Guru's aunty
- Aanchal Goswami as Chhavi, Guru's cousin

== Production ==
In November 2022, the film was selected for India's Film Bazaar strand, which is a part of Film Bazaar, the South Asia film project market operated by India's National Film Development Corporation.

Agra was filmed in June and July 2019. It was shot on location in Agra. In 2020, when the film was in the middle of post production, its release was held up for five months due to COVID-19 pandemic.

== Release ==
The film premiered at 2023 Cannes Film Festival in Directors' Fortnight on 24 May 2023.

In August 2023, it was selected at 2023 Indian Film Festival of Melbourne, where it won the Best Indie Film award and Best Performance in Film (male) award for Mohit Agarwal.

It was screened at the 28th Busan International Film Festival in 'A Window on Asian Cinema' on 7 October 2023, as well as at the 20th Hong Kong Asian Film Festival (zh:香港亞洲電影節) on 31 October and 12 November 2023. It was also screened at the Jio MAMI Mumbai Film Festival 2023, where it won the Special Jury Prize.

It was released theatrically in India on 14 November 2025.

== Reception ==
On the review aggregator website Rotten Tomatoes, 88% of 16 critics' reviews are positive, with an average rating of 6.3/10.

Agra which had its world premiere in the Directors’ Fortnight section of the 76th Cannes Film Festival received a 5-minute standing ovation.

Fabien Lemercier reviewing for Cineuropa praised the film and wrote, "A hard-hitting and audacious film that will leave no one indifferent and that only a formally talented filmmaker like Kanu Behl could bring to a safe harbour beyond its ambient darkness." Namrata Joshi of ScreenDaily wrote in review that in the film "...the characters are developed well and have complexity to them, and the terrific ensemble cast elevates the film; particularly Bose, Agarwal and Roy...".

Shubhra Gupta of The Indian Express gave a positive review and described it as "a triumphal return to Cannes". Anna M. M. Vetticad wrote on Himal Southasian: "Agra is an unsettling reminder of why society should study the victim-turned-victimiser phenomenon, the heterogeneity of evil and persecution, if we wish to combat the self-destructive nature of patriarchy." Vetticad added, "The optimistic view is that just as 'life finds a way', to quote Steven Spielberg’s Jurassic Park, so too good cinema will find its audience."

== Accolades ==
Name of the award ceremony, year presented, category, nominee(s) of the award, and the result of the nomination
Award ceremony	Year	Category	Nominee / Work	Result	Ref.
Indian Film Festival of Melbourne	2023	Best Indie Film	Agra	Won	
Indian Film Festival of Melbourne	2023	Best Performance in Film (male)	Mohit Agarwal	Won	
