= E. E. Speight =

English lexicographer and professor (1871–1949)

Ernest Edwin Speight
- circa 1930 in India
- Born: 6 December 1871; Bradford, Yorkshire, England
- Died: 17 September 1949 (aged 77); Ooty, Madras Province, Dominion of India (now Tamil Nadu, India)
- Other name: E E Speight
- Occupations: Professor of English, author
- Known for: Lexicography, educationalist, philosopher, poet, anthropologist, Publisher

Ernest Edwin Speight (6 December 1871 – 17 September 1949), usually known as E. E. Speight, was an Englishman who travelled in Japan and India and was a professor of English for twenty years at the Imperial University, Tokyo, Japan and also at the Fourth Higher School, Kanazawa, then for a further twenty years at the Osmania University, Hyderabad, India. In India he made a study of the Nilgiri hill tribes and was working on a Toda grammar at his death

In Speight's youth he was a friend of W. B. Yeats, A. E. Housman and George Bernard Shaw, in his latter years of Tagore, Aurobindo, Mohandas K Gandhi, and Prince Peter of Greece and Denmark for whom he reviewed some of his writings.

In addition to teaching, Speight wrote a substantial number of English textbooks, some of which remain in use in the 21st-century English syllabus in India. Speight also wrote fiction, poetry, music, and edited anthologies.

With his business partner R. H. Walpole, Speight issued The Saracen's Head Library (Mary Kingsley Travel Books) book series published by the E. E. Speight & R. H. Walpole publishing house based in Teignmouth, in Devon.

== Personal life ==
Speight was married twice. On 11 July 1899 he married Ragna Grõn (11 July 1876 – 3 May 1953) of Norway who travelled to Japan overland by train through Russia from Norway twice with their young son Arthur, and he later married Doris Allix (10 July 1901 – 22 May 1991) in India with whom he had two sons, Peter and Michael.

== Honours ==
Speight was awarded the Fifth Class of the Order of the Rising Sun by the Emperor of Japan for services to teaching, and was allowed this honour by the King.

== Bibliography ==
- Speight, E E (March 2007). Indian Masters of English – An Anthology of English Prose By Indian Writers. Davidson Press. ISBN 978-1-4067-1209-4.
- Speight, E E; Sethi, G L (1948). A High School Composition for Matriculation Classes. Orient Longmans Ltd., Madras 2.
- Speight, E E; Nance, R Morton (1 January 1912). Britain's Sea Story. UK: Henry Frowde. ASIN B000LQ60UM.
- Speight, E E (March 2007). Sentinel Hours. Rinsland Press. ISBN 978-1-4067-6932-6.
- Speight, E E (1905). Hakluyt's English Voyages. Marshall. ASIN B000SEJSM4.
- Speight, E E (1903). Children of Odin. H. Marshall.
- Speight, E E; Dowden, Edward (1 January 1899). The temple reader: A reading book in literature for school and home (New English series). Horace Marshall and Son. ASIN B0008B8NKK.
- Speight, E E (1 January 1908). Galleon of Torbay, The: A Romance. Chatto & Windus. ASIN B000GLGYOY.
- Speight, E E (1917). Black's sentinel readers: Book IV. A. & C. Black. ASIN B0008B8Q98.
- Speight, E E (1919). Black's sentinel readers: Book V. A. & C. Black. ASIN B0008B8Q9I.
- Speight, E E (1915). Black's sentinel readers: Book VI. A. & C. Black. ASIN B0008B8Q8Y.
- Speight, E E (July 1936). "Marmaduke Pickthall". Islamic Culture. X: iii–vi.
- Reeves, The hon W P; Speight, E E. The Imperial Reader: being a descriptive account of the territories forming the British Empire. ASIN B0017H4K5G.
- Speight, E E (30 June 1911). "A Few Norwegian Proverbs". Folklore. 22 (2). Taylor & Francis on behalf of Folklore Enterprises: 213–218. doi:10.1080/0015587x.1911.9719475. JSTOR 1255063.
- Major, A F (Albany Featherstonehaugh); Speight, E E; Powell, Frederick York (1899). Stories from the Northern Sagas. Horace Marshall & Son.
- Lamb, Charles; Speight, E E (1905). The Adventures of Ulysses. Horace Marshall and Son. ASIN B001BYOCSA.
- Speight, E E (1922). "Poems Made on the Royal Visit of Jito Tenno to the Shrine of Yoshino by Hitomaro, Meiji Seitoku Kinen Gakkai Kiyou". 17. Meiji Seitoku Kinen Gakkai: 12–13. Archived from the original on 22 July 2011.
- Jefferies, Richard; Speight, E E. The Story of My Heart (Waga Kokoro No Ki). Kenkyusha Limited. ISBN 978-4-327-01086-7.

== See also ==
- 1934 in poetry
- James Murdoch
