= Minus 31: The Nagpur Files =

- Theatrical release poster
- Directed by: Pratik Moitro
- Screenplay by: Charulata Maitra; Ankit Bhuptani
- Story by: Pratik Moitro; Charulata Maitra
- Produced by: Pratik Moitro
- Starring: Rucha Inamdar; Shivankit Singh Parihar; Raghubir Yadav; Rajesh Sharma; Santosh Juvekar; Jaya Bhattacharya
- Cinematography: Sulabh Bangale
- Edited by: Abhishek Sharma
- Music by: Udayan Dharmadhikari
- Production company: Orangepixel Studios
- Distributed by: Dragon Water Films
- Release date: 21 July 2023
- Running time: 122 minutes
- Country: India
- Language: Hindi
- Box office: ₹0.06 crore

Minus 31: The Nagpur Files is a 2023 Indian Hindi-language Neo-noir crime thriller film written, produced and directed by Pratik Moitro, starring Rucha Inamdar, Shivankit Singh Parihar, and Raghubir Yadav in pivotal roles.

== Premise ==
The film explores the systemic failures of institutions such as policing and healthcare, against the backdrop of the 2nd wave of COVID-19 pandemic in India. It tells the story of a clumsy police officer encountering an intriguing suspect during a murder investigation. Additionally, the film showcases the underground hip-hop scene during times of crisis and highlights how people take advantage of difficult situations.

== Cast ==
- Rucha Inamdar as Preksha Sharma
- Shivankit Singh Parihar as Gautam Agarwal
- Raghubir Yadav as Anupam Sharma
- Rajesh Sharma as Dayanand Pande
- Santosh Juvekar as Guddu
- Jaya Bhattacharya as Rahi Shirke
- Shreyash Atkar as Devansh
- Kaam Bhaari as Sandeep 'Sandy' Sontakke
- Renuka Daftardar as Ramya
- Ganesh Deshmukh as Vinayak Meshram
- Nisha Dhar as Preksha Meshram
- Samidha Guru as Shakuntala Pande
- Debashish Naha as Nanabhau Deshmukh
- Pranjal Pateriya as Jagdish Pawar
- Ruturaj Wankhede as Mahavir

== Production ==
Minus 31: The Nagpur Files is produced by Orangepixel Studios Private Limited. The film is co-produced by Karan Vishal Konde, Nisheeta Keni, and Darshini Entertainment. It is directed by Pratik Moitro, with the story written by Charulata Maitra and Pratik Moitro. The screenplay and dialogues are written by Charulata Maitra and Ankit Bhuptani.
