= Gangor =

- Poster of Gangor
- Directed by: Italo Spinelli
- Screenplay by: Antonio Falduto; Italo Spinelli
- Story by: Mahasweta Devi
- Produced by: Angelo Barbagallo; Vinod Kumar; Isabella Spinelli
- Starring: Priyanka Bose; Adil Hussain; Samrat Chakrabarti; Seema Rahmani; Tillotama Shome
- Cinematography: Marco Onorato
- Edited by: Jacopo Quadri
- Music by: Iqbal Darbar; Sahil Sultanpuri (lyrics)
- Release dates: 31 October 2010 (Rome); 11 March 2011
- Running time: 92 minutes
- Country: Italy
- Language: Bengali

Gangor is a 2010 multilingual, Independent film directed by Italo Spinelli. The Italian production is based on a Bangla short story "Choli Ke Peeche" (Behind the Bodice) by Mahasweta Devi. The film was shot in West Bengal in India with dialogues in Bengali, Santhali and English. The film was later dubbed into Italian. At the 5th Rome Film Festival where the cast of the film got a standing ovation at the film's screening.

The film won the Best Film, Best Director, Best Actor and Best Actress awards at the New Jersey Independent South Asian Film Festival. The film won the NETPAC Jury award at the 10th Third Eye Asian Film Festival 2011. The film won the top award named after Filipino director Lino Brocka at the 13th Cinemanila International Film Festival in Philippines.

== Plot ==
Upin, a veteran photojournalist comes to Purulia in West Bengal to report on the violence against the poor tribal women in the impoverished region. There he comes across Gangor breast-feeding her child. He photographs her using one of the pictures for his news report. The picture triggers a backlash as she is shunned by the villagers. The policemen take her forcibly to the police station and gang rape her. In the meantime, Upin realizes his folly and haunted by the hushed-up violence travels back to Purulia to look for her. Gangor is no longer there and no one knows her whereabouts. Determined to find her Upin presses on his search and one night meets her, now a prostitute. Gangor asks him to photograph her again taking off her blouse to reveal how her body was mutilated by the policemen during the gang-rape. Upin runs away from her falling on the railway track and coming under the wheels of the train. As the incident comes to the attention media, Gangor’s case reaches court. On the day of the hearing of her case, a group of tribal women led by activist Medha take off their blouses on the court premises to mark their protest against police brutality.

== Cast ==
- Priyanka Bose as Gangor
- Adil Hussain as Upin
- Samrat Chakrabarti as Ujan
- Tillotama Shome as Medha
- Seema Rahmani as Shital
- Vikas Shrivastav as Daroga
- Ashok Kumar Beniwal as Police Inspector
