= Zenda (film) =

2010 Marathi film by Avadhoot Gupte

- Theatrical release poster
- Directed by: Avdhoot Gupte
- Written by: Avdhoot Gupte; Sachin Darekar
- Produced by: Avdhoot Gupte; Atul Kamble
- Starring: Siddharth Chandekar; Rajesh Shringarpure; Sachit Patil; Santosh Juvekar; Pushkar Shrotri; Sunil Tawade; Chinmay Mandlekar
- Cinematography: Rahul Jadhav
- Edited by: Imran Mahadik Faisal Mahadik
- Music by: Avdhoot Gupte
- Production company: A Square Entertainments
- Release date: 22 January 2010
- Running time: 118 minutes
- Country: India
- Language: Marathi

Zenda (Meaning: Flag) is a 2010 Indian Marathi-language political drama film produced, directed and co-written by Avdhoot Gupte. The film stars Pushkar Shrotri, Rajesh Shrungarpure, and Santosh Juvekar in lead roles. Gupte, who is a singer and music director, has also composed the music for the film.

The film depicts the journey of four young ambitious scholars to succeed in life and the impact of a split in a major political party on their journey caused by a feud between two cousins in rival political parties. The story is inspired by the real-life feud between Raj Thackeray, chief of Maharashtra Navnirman Sena (MNS) and his cousin, Uddhav Thackeray, President of Shiv Sena.

== Plot ==
The movie is based on actual life of party workers who have aligned their loyalty towards a particular political party and also loosely based on the political family of Balasaheb Thackeray.

It highlights the past of the party and the organization involved in fighting for the Marathi community in Maharashtra, India.

The storyline depicts the plight of party workers who have aligned their loyalty towards a particular political party based on its apex leader. When the leadership baton is passed on to the next generation, one of the new leaders breaks away from the core. What follows is a rift between friends who were once bonded together by the cause led by the party and now find themselves opposing each other.

The movie also touches on the part where political images have been built completely based on media and PR exercises. Under pressure from the media campaign managers and in an attempt to please the minority vote banks, the ideologies behind the parties are sacrificed, leaving the purists and youth betrayed.

Amongst the betrayed are also the youth who break away to establish themselves from under the shadow of the older leadership, only to find that their good work left aside when it is time for an election ticket allotment.

== Cast ==
- Siddharth Chandekar as Umesh Jagtap
- Neha Joshi as Pooja
- Santosh Juvekar as Santosh (Santya) Shinde
- Chinmay Mandlekar as Avinash Mohite
- Sachit Patil as Aditya Pradhan
- Tejashri Pradhan as Umesh's love interest & Santya's sister
- Pratham Patkar
- Pushkar Shrotri as Prashant Sarpotdar (based on Uddhav Thackeray)
- Rajesh Shringarpure as Rajesh Sarpotdar (based on Raj Thackeray)
- Shubhangi Gokhale as Santosh's Mother
- Ujwala Jog as Umesh's Mother
- Ramesh Vani as Bhate

== Music ==
The music for the songs is composed by Avdhoot Gupte.

| No. | Title | Lyrics | Singer(s) | Length |
|---|---|---|---|---|
| 1. | "Aansuon Ki Khwahishein" | | Avadhoot Gupte |
| 2. | "Zalzale" | | Avadhoot Gupte | 04:42 |
| 3. | "Antari Vajati" | | Nihira Joshi, Swapnil Bandodkar |
| 4. | Untitled | | Avadhoot Gupte |
| 5. | "Saavdhan" | | Avadhoot Gupte, Swapnil Bandodkar |
| 6. | "Nakhwa" | | Vaishali Samant |
| 7. | "Patil Ala" | | Vaishali Samant |
| 8. | "Vitthala Konta Zenda" | Arvind Jagtap | Dnyaneshwar Meshram | 04:13 |

== Release and Issues ==
Set to release earlier, the film was stalled by protests by Swabhiman organisation headed by Nitesh Rane, son of then Maharashtra Revenue Minister Narayan Rane, for showing his father in a poor light.

The film was criticized by several MNS activists and leaders, although in a private screening to Uddhav Thackeray, he approved it.
