= Bhikari =

2017 Marathi film directed by Ganesh Acharya

- Directed by: Ganesh Acharya
- Screenplay by: Guru Thakur
- Story by: Sasi
- Based on: Pichaikkaran by Sasi
- Produced by: Sharad Devram Shelar, Ganesh Acharya
- Starring: Swwapnil Joshi, Rucha Inamdar, Kirti Adarkar, Sayaji Shinde
- Cinematography: Mahesh Limaye
- Edited by: Manoj Magarr
- Music by: Milind Wankhede, Vishal Mishra
- Production company: Mi Marathi Film Production
- Release date: 4 August 2017
- Running time: 165 minutes
- Language: Marathi

Bhikari (transl. Beggar) is a 2017 Marathi-language action drama film co-produced and directed by Ganesh Acharya. The film stars Swapnil Joshi, Rucha Inamdar and Kirti Adarkar, with Sayaji Shinde, Guru Thakur and Kailash Waghmare in supporting roles.

The film, a remake of the 2016 Tamil-language film Pichaikkaran, revolves around a young businessman who is forced to live the life of a beggar to cure his ailing mother and in the process faces various problems. The film was released on 4 August 2017 to mixed to positive reviews.

== Cast ==
- Swapnil Joshi
- Rucha Inamdar
- Sayaji Shinde
- Milind Shinde
- Amanda Rosario as item number

== Production ==
Botany Bay and Kingsgate Bay, in Thanet, Kent are featured as the seaside location in Samrat's fantasy.

== Soundtrack ==
Bhikari

Soundtrack album by Milind Wankhede, Vishal Mishra
- Released: July 25, 2017
- Recorded: 2017
- Genre: Soundtrack
- Length: 32:36
- Label: Zee Music Company
- Producer: Milind Wankhede, Vishal Mishra

The music was composed by Milind Wankhede, Vishal Mishra and released by Zee Music Company.

Track list
No.	Title	Lyrics	Music	Singer(s)	Length
1.	"Deva Ho Deva"	Vikky Nagar, Prasanna Deshmukh	Milind Wankhede	Sukhwinder Singh, Divya Kumar	5:40
2.	"Maagu Kasa Mi"	Guru Thakur	Vishal Mishra	Ajay Gogavale	6:09
3.	"Ye Ata"	Guru Thakur	Vishal Mishra	Vishal Mishra, Sunidhi Chauhan	5:17
4.	"Kasha Chi Shendi"	Subodh Pawar, Ganesh Acharya	Milind Wankhede	Avadhoot Gupte, Anand Shinde, Ganesh Acharya	4:09
5.	"Bala"	Guru Thakur	Vishal Mishra	Vishal Mishra	3:01
6.	"Aai"	Milind Wankhede, Subodh Pawar, Guru Thakur	Milind Wankhede	Sonu Nigam	5:12
7.	"Ye Ata (Slow Version)"	Guru Thakur	Vishal Mishra	Vishal Mishra, Sunidhi Chauhan	1:59
8.	"Aai (Slow Version)"	Milind Wankhede, Subodh Pawar, Guru Thakur	Milind Wankhede	Sonu Nigam	1:09
Total length:					32:36

== Release ==
The film was released on 4 August 2017.

=== Critical response ===
Pune Mirror wrote, "The script has remained true to the original, but seems artificial in presentation. And if a South Indian action film seems more realistic than its Marathi version, we have a problem." Times of India wrote "There are films that have the standard run-of-the-mill stuff and others that are totally hatke; Bhikari falls somewhere in between. It has the right mix of star power and masala, along with an emotionally touching story about a mother and her son. The execution is where this film falters."

=== Box office ===
Bhikari had a below par opening at the box office. It collected ₹0.31 crore (US$37,000), ₹0.53 crore (US$63,000) and ₹0.64 crore (US$76,000), making a total of ₹1.48 crore (US$180,000) in its first 3-days respectively.
