= Date Bhet =

- Theatrical release poster
- Directed by: Lokesh Gupte
- Written by: Ashwini Shende
- Produced by: Shivanshu Pandey; Hitesh Ruparelia; Swati Khopkar
- Starring: Hemant Dhome; Sonalee Kulkarni; Santosh Juvekar
- Cinematography: Pradeep Khanvilkar
- Edited by: Gurjant Singh
- Music by: Chinar - Mahesh
- Production companies: Amey Vinod Khopkar Entertainment; Zabawa Entertainment
- Distributed by: Filmastra Studios
- Release date: 14 July 2023
- Country: India
- Language: Marathi

Date Bhet is a 2023 Indian Marathi-language romantic drama film directed by Lokesh Gupte, written by Ashwini Shende. It is jointly produced by AVK Entertainment and Zabawa Entertainment, distributed by Filmastra Studios. The film stars Hemant Dhome, Sonalee Kulkarni and Santosh Juvekar in leading roles.

== Plot ==
Anaya Pandit marries Siddharth in a hurry, but their six-month marriage ends in divorce as their love wanes. Anaya's family is pushing her to get married again, so she uses a dating website to find software engineer Rohan, who is based in the United Kingdom. Since Rohan isn't accessible, Anaya is taken aback to be welcomed to the UK by Abhijeet, a kind taxi driver. Anaya is disappointed in Rohan because of his messy house and erratic behaviour, so she asks Abhijeet for help. They become closer and acknowledge their love for one another.

== Cast ==
- Hemant Dhome
- Sonalee Kulkarni
- Santosh Juvekar

== Production ==
The filming has been done in London. In the midst of the COVID-19 pandemic the year before, the film crew wrapped up filming in London.

== Release ==
=== Theatrical ===
The film was theatrically released on 14 July 2023. Previously it was scheduled to be released on 24 February 2023.

=== Home media ===
It was digitally released on Amazon Prime Video.

== Reception ==
Anub George of The Times of India rated two stars out of five and wrote "A paper thin plot, poor direction and clunky dialogues lead to 'Date Bhet' being an entirely skippable film."

Saurav Mahind of Urbanly gave one out of five stars and reviewed: Date Bhet is an ordinary rom-com with no charm and no romance. Not worth your time and money.

== Music ==
Date Bhet

Soundtrack album by Chinar - Mahesh
- Released: 2023
- Genre: Feature film soundtrack
- Length: 16:19
- Language: Marathi
- Label: Video Palace

All lyrics are written by Ashwini Shende; all music is composed by Chinar - Mahesh.

Track listing
No.	Title	Singer (s)	Length
1.	"Befikar"	Rupali Moghe	3:29
2.	"Mitatil Ka Antare"	Chinar Kharkar	3:11
3.	"Vaara Vaara"	Jaydeep Bagwadkar, Bela Shinde	4:14
4.	"Visaruni Ya Jagala"	Larissa Almeida	1:48
Total length:			16:19
