= Sharyat =

- Sharyat
- Directed by: Viju Mane
- Written by: Hemant Edlabadkar; Viju Mane
- Produced by: Ashwamedh Productions
- Starring: Sachin Pilgaonkar; Neena Kulkarni; Vidyadhar Joshi; Santosh Juvekar; Tejashree Pradhan; Sampada Joglekar
- Cinematography: Shabbir Naik
- Edited by: Satish Patil
- Music by: Chinar-Mahesh
- Release date: 16 December 2011 (India)
- Country: India
- Language: Marathi

Sharyat (Marathi:शर्यत; Meaning: Race) is a 2011 Indian Marathi-language film directed by Viju Mane, which stars Sachin Pilgaonkar, Neena Kulkarni, Vidyadhar Joshi & Santosh Juvekar in lead roles. The film revolves around how two families fight for "Mahadevacha Pujacha Maan", which literally translated in English means "the privilege to hold the puja of Shiva", (Mahadev is another name for Shiva) by taking part in the bullock cart race in their village.

== Plot ==
Dhananjay Rao is considered an ace in the bullock cart race held ever year in his village. He is also the family friend of Gayatri Devi, the wife of the village Zamindar. Dhananjay has won the race numerous times under the Zamindar's patronage. But one day, Dhananjay suffers an accident during the race due to the fickle-minded antics of another fellow racer Pratap Rao, and the zamindar is paralysed due to the shock he received from Dhananjay's defeat.

After a few years, Dhananjay, who has quit the race after his defeat, is still the talking point of the village. Some people also say that this would be the last bullock cart race in the village for the privilege of the Puja of Shiva. Meanwhile, the power at the paralysed Zamindar's house went off due to a defective fuse in the fuse box, while two of his aides were in charge of repairing the fuse, the Zamindar, who was left off by his attendant along with his wheelchair near the staircase of the house in order to help the aide, attempts to kill himself by running his wheelchair over the stairs. But at the right moment, Dhananjay enters the scene, and saves him as the lights are turned on again.

The next day, Gayatri Devi, who is now in charge of the house summons Dhananjay and thanks him for saving her husband's life. She requests him to take part in the race for privilege again, but Dhananjay refuses saying that it is not possible for him to do so as the memories of his defeat still haunts him and as such he has lost all interest in the race.

In the meantime, Dhananjay gets a threat call written on a note, saying that his brother Sanjay has been held captive by the feisty and cruel owner of a casino as he was cheating in the game of cards and taking away all his money. Dhananjay reaches the site and pleads in front of the manager of the rasino after creating a ruckus at the start, to let his brother Sanjay be freed, but the manager agrees to free him on one condition- Dhananjay has to submit a compensation of one million rupees to him failing which his brother would be bruised and battered and hanged from a net which he termed the "dire consequence" of his cheating.

He rushes to a nearby Sugar cane mill where Gayatri Devi was monitoring it, and asks her for the money. Gayatri agrees to give him the money under one condition - he has to play the bullock cart race. Seeing no other option open, Dhananjay agrees to her conditions. Dhananjay finally frees Sanjay from the clutches of the Casino owner and coaxes him for his job at the casino.

After bringing Sanjay to the village, Dhananjay leaves the spot, but he is soon confronted by his arch rival, Pratap Rao, who ridicules him, is humiliated when he learns that he shall be taking part in the race for privilege and is challenged by Dhananjay to defeat him. Dhananjay returns to Gayatri's house at night for dinner, where he is introduced to her daughter Kanchana. On seeing her, Dhananjay's brother Sanjay tries to hide his face from her as he has previously encountered her near a petrol pump, and Kanchana mistook him as a pump attendant and also scolds him for flirting with her. But as the story progresses, Sanjay and Kanchana slowly begin to bond with each other, which ultimately culminates into love.

Meanwhile, Pratap Rao tries to device methods of defeating Dhananjay in the race, Dhananjay, in the meantime too, begins his preparation by choosing the perfect pair of bullocks for the race, he begins training the bullocks for the race after getting them and also tries to take good care of them.

A few days before the race, the two families bring their bullocks in front of the Temple of Shiva to seek blessings, but they are stopped in midway by a policeman who holds in front of them a brown envelope announcing that the race will not be held anymore as per orders received from the headquarters. Gayatri suspects this as foul play by Pratap Rao and hires another trustworthy policeman to know the truth. The policeman enters Pratap Rao's house to know his entire plan. Pratap Rao in an inebriated state, discloses the entire plan in front of the policeman.

Next day, Pratap Rao pays a visit to Gayatri's house, but is surprised when he sees the policeman who visited his house last night, standing near Gayatri's house. Realising that it was not possible for him to make Gayatri enter into a compromise, Pratap Rao visits Dhananjay's house in the evening and threatens him that he must lose the race.

On the day of the race, Gayatri tells Dhananjay Rao that he must win this 12-minute race in just 10 minutes, otherwise he will not be able to see his brother alive again. Dhananjay gets terrorised on hearing this and determined to save his brother from any injury, he begins to run his cart. In the race, he encounters many many obstacles created for him by the devil Pratap Rao, But he finally breaks all obstacles and wins the race in 10 minutes.

Dhananjay then rushes to the Sugar mill where Sanjay is said to have been held captive. While searching the entire mill, he sees two fat human bodies falling from the first floor, followed by Sanjay jumping from the railing of the mill. He tells Dhananjay, that during the race, these men tried to shoot his bullocks, so he outnumbered them. At the same moment, Gayatri's daughter Kanchana arrives with her mother and discloses their relation to Dhananjay.

Suddenly, Pratap Rao, humiliated at his defeat enters the scene. He discovered that his wife has told Dhananjay about his plans and he tries to shoot her in front of all. But suddenly a bullock probably angry of Pratap's rude behaviour towards it, knocks him to the floor. After a fight with Dhananjay, Partap is killed by the bullock whom he misbehaved. The story finally ends with Dhananjay, Gayatri Sanjay and Kanchana doing the puja in the temple.

== Cast ==
- Sachin Pilgaonkar as Dhananjay Rao
- Neena Kulkarni as Gayatri Devi
- Vidyadhar Joshi as Prataprao
- Santosh Juvekar as Sanjay
- Tejashree Pradhan as Kanchana
- Neha Pendse (special appearance in an item number "Sheelachya Aicha Gho")

== Music ==
Soundtrack of the film is scored by Chinar - Mahesh, was released worldwide on 5 December 2011 by Nanubhai of Video Palace. The lyrics were provided by Ashok Bagwe & Viju Mane. The Music score was pleasant and songs like "Mala saang Naa" and "Sheela Chya Aaicha Gho" became instant hit.

Song	Singer(s)	Duration	Lyrics
"Sheelachya Aaicha Gho"	Urmila Dhangar, Viju Mane	4:45	Ashok Bagwe, Viju Mane
"Raanamadi Ekatach Dultoy"	Urmila Dhangar, Ashok Bagawe	7:11	Ashok Bagwe, Viju Mane
"Sharyat Laagali"	Sachin Pilgaonkar, Ashok Bagawe	3:54	Ashok Bagwe, Viju Mane
"Mala Saang Naa"	Swapnil Bandodkar, Mahalaxmi Iyer, Viju Mane	4:40	Ashok Bagwe, Viju Mane
"Aakrit Ghadala"	Sachin Pilgaonkar, Ashok Bagawe	3:21	Ashok Bagwe, Viju Mane

== Related Pages ==
- Sachin Pilgaonkar
- Neena Kulkarni
- Santosh Juvekar
- Chinar - Mahesh
- Viju Mane
