= Children of War (2014 film) =

- Directed by: Mrityunjay Devvrat
- Written by: Mrityunjay Devvrat & Asad Hussain
- Produced by: Soumya Joshi Devvrat
- Starring: Riddhi Sen; Rucha Inamdar; Victor Banerjee; Farooque Shaikh; Pavan Malhotra; Indraneil Sengupta; Raima Sen; Tilotama Shome; Shatrunjay Devvrat
- Cinematography: Fasahat Khan
- Edited by: Apurva Asrani
- Music by: Sidhant Mathur (Songs); Ishaan Chhabra (Score)
- Production companies: Pencil Cell Productions & Maktub Entertainment
- Distributed by: AA Films
- Release date: 16 May 2014
- Running time: 160 minutes
- Country: India
- Language: Hindi

Children of War, also known as The Bastard Child, is a 2014 Hindi drama film directed by Mrityunjay Devvrat based on the 1971 Bangladesh genocide and the Bangladesh Liberation War. The film released on 16 May 2014 in India and Bangladesh. The film stars Pavan Malhotra, Raima Sen, Tillotama Shome, Indraneil Sengupta, Farooq Sheikh, Shatrunjay Devvrat, Riddhi Sen, Rucha Inamdar, and Victor Banerjee. It was filmed in India with similar characters and places mimicking Bangladesh.

This film was based on real events in Bangladesh in 1971. As the film progresses towards its climax, the three stories begin to intertwine with one another. It was telecast in Bangladesh Nationalised TV named "Bangladesh Television".

== Plot ==
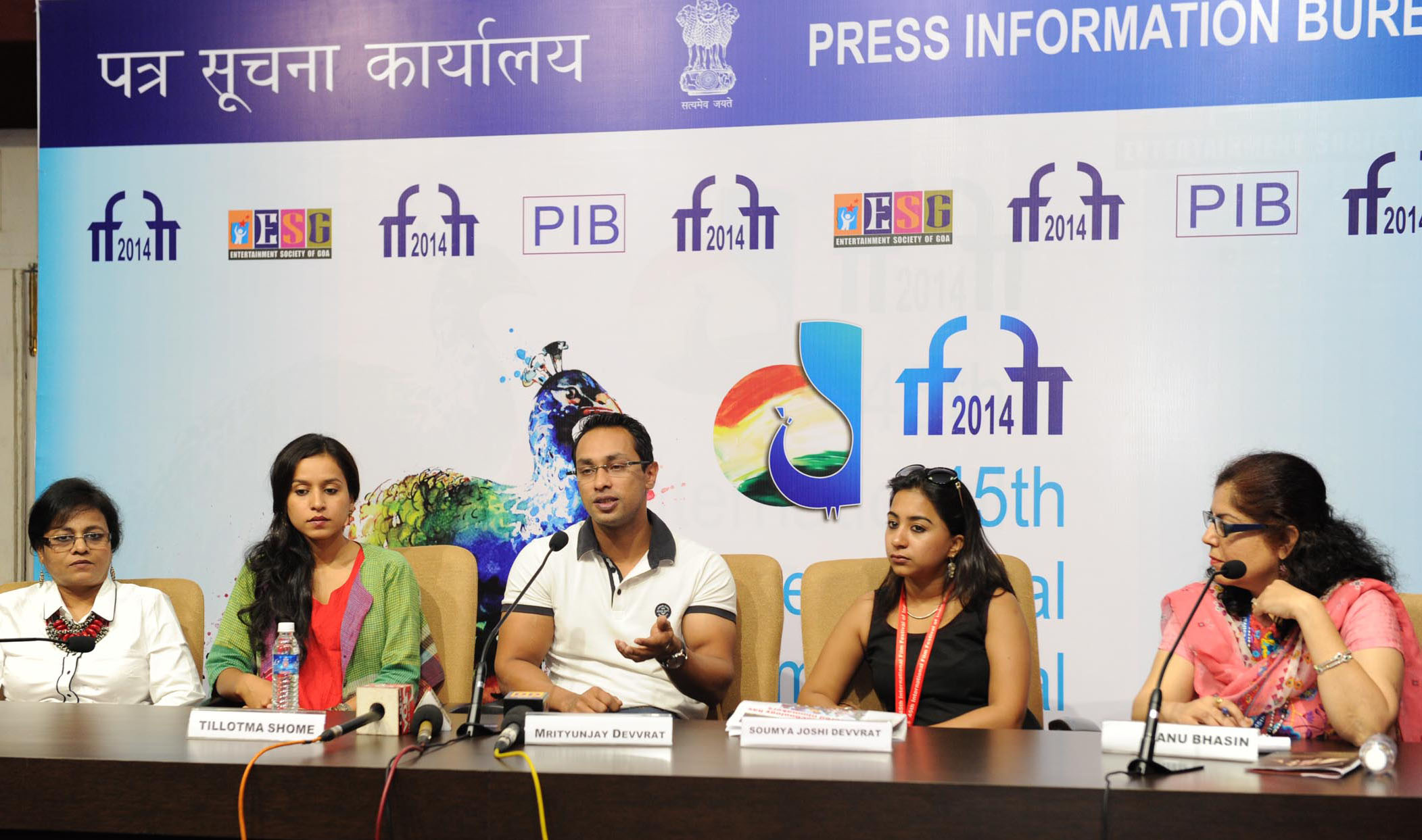
Press conference at IFFI 2014

1971: In a forest clearing, an old man is sitting with an earthen pot, chanting Hindu mantras. A little girl asks him, "what are you doing?", to which he replies, "this is my family. I am helping them sleep."

The President of Pakistan Yahya Khan is quoted, "Kill 3 million of them and the rest will eat out of our hands".

Indian Prime minister Indira Gandhi is being interviewed. The interviewer asks her, "You have spoken of first steps needed to improve the situation, the first step being to stop the exodus of refugees. Now can it not be fairly put to you that you are contributing in a way to the exodus of the refugees by your support for the Pakistan guerillas who are operating in East Pakistan—Pakistan army takes reprisals against them, against villages which harbour the guerilla fighters and that causes the exodus, or is at least in part responsible for it. Now must not you, in effect, face the question of having to reduce your support for the guerilla armies operating in East Pakistan?"

The Prime Minister replies "Does that mean we allow a massacre to continue? What happened first? How many people were killed according to your correspondents of British newspapers, of American newspapers, of French newspapers, Canadian newspapers, Arabian newspapers? The massacre began long before there was a single guerilla."

Present day: In a college campus, a young man on stage tells a crowd of students "first we are Bangladeshi. Then, a Bengali. And lastly, a Muslim."

26 March 1971: Bangladeshi leader Sheikh Mujibur Rahman makes the Proclamation of Bangladeshi Independence the radio, "This may be my last message, from today Bangladesh is independent. I call upon the people of Bangladesh wherever you might be and with whatever you have, to resist the army of occupation to the last. Your fight must go on until the last soldier of Pakistan's occupation army is expelled from the soil of Bangladesh and final victory is achieved."

The next day, a journalist, Amir (Indraneil Sengupta) and his wife, Fida (Raima Sen) are in bed, when Pakistan Army personnel break open the door and enter. The officer, Malik (Pavan Malhotra) shoots the maid who tries to stop them, after which his soldiers beat up Amir and he rapes Fida.

Fida is abducted by the Pakistan Army men and brought in a truck to a prison camp along with a number of other women. In the camp, the women are beaten and forced to take off their clothes. They are then separated into two groups based on age. The older women are lined up and shot, while the younger women are taken to a large shed that serves as their living quarters.

Later, the Pakistani officer Malik explains to his men why the women have been brought there. "These women have been brought here to serve the nation (mulk ki khidmat). The children who will be born from their wombs will be theirs as well as ours. They will be the children of Pakistan. All these women's job is to give birth to children. And if possible, more than one. And those who cannot, have no need to live. This way, we will wipe out the bloodline of the Bengalis."

A few days later, Amir has survived and is recuperating. His colleagues come to visit him and inform him that many journalists have been killed. They decide to do whatever is needed to report on the atrocities by the Pakistan Army so that the world hears of it. Amir tells them he knows what to do and calls Archer Blood, the American Consul General to Dhaka and takes an appointment with him. When he is travelling to meet Archer, the bus he is travelling in is intercepted by the Pakistan Army, and all the men are killed, while the women are abducted. Amir manages to escape undetected.

In the meanwhile, a young woman Kausar (Rucha Inamdar) and her brother Rafiq (Riddhi Sen) are playing in the forest. As they wander around, they chance upon a village which has been the site of a massacre with many dead bodies.

That night, a convoy of refugees fleeing the Pakistanis come to the village where Kausar and Rafiq are staying. At first, Rafiq refuses to allow them into the village, but Kausar tells them they are welcome and apologises for Rafiq. Baba (Victor Banerjee), the leader of the convoy tells them they are moving towards the Indian border where they will be safe. That night, one of the women in the refugee convoy gives birth to a baby, and Kausar offers sweets to the refugees. There are celebrations in the group that night. The next day, the refugee convoy along with Kausar and Rafiq leaves the village, proceeding on their journey towards India.

Amir manages to reach the house of Archer Blood, and tells him about the atrocities of the Pakistan Army. The Consul General promises to raise it with the American government and bring pressure on the Pakistanis to stop their atrocities.

The next day, the refugee convoy is attacked by the Pakistani Army and a number of people are killed. Rafiq sees a Pakistani soldier trying to rape his sister and attacks him. He manages to take his revolver and shoots him. Rafiq and Kausar survive.

Amir then meets Mujeed (Farooq Sheikh), a rich man who is organising a resistance movement. Mujeed's men capture a Razakar who he had helped in the past and had later joined the Pakistanis in killing innocent people. When Majeed asks him why he is committing these atrocities, he replies, "it was you who enrolled me in the madrasa. I'm just doing what I was taught in the madrasa."

Amir joins Majeed's men and they start guerrilla attacks on Pakistani soldiers. A few days later, they intercept an army vehicle and take the Pakistani officer Malik as prisoner. Malik is held as a prisoner and Majeed tells him that the Mukti Bahini and the Indian Army have won and asks him to tell his men to surrender. But instead, Malik laughs and taunts Amir about how he raped his wife. In anger, Amir shoots Malik dead.

Kausar and Rafiq reach the Indian border and head towards it across a river. But they are spotted by some Pakistani soldiers, and Rafiq is shot.

That same night, the rebels including Amir raid the camp where Fida and other women are being held captive and release the women. When Amir finds Fida and sees she's heavily pregnant, she starts to walk away, expecting he will reject her. But he takes her hand and holds her back.

Present day: The young man exhorts the people to unite and identify the razakars who are still living in their midst, and bring them to justice.

== Cast ==
- Riddhi Sen as Rafiq
- Rucha Inamdar as Kausar
- Victor Banerjee as Baba
- Pavan Malhotra as Malik
- Indraneil Sengupta as Aamir
- Raima Sen as Fida
- Tilottama Shome as Bhitika
- Shatrunjay Devvrat as Young Aamir
- Joy Sengupta as Sudipto
- Farooq Sheikh as Mujeed
- Purnendu Bhattacharya as Abbu
- Ganga Chakravorthy as Ammi
- Roopa Ganguly as Raziya
- Aweree Chaurey as Durga (Old Woman)
- Ravi Verma
- Chandra Sengupta as Old Man
- Rupsa Mondal as Mariyam
- Bhushan Vidhate as Raziya's Husband
- Harish Chhabra as Soldier Bull 1
- Devendra Chauhan as Soldier Bull 2
- Vidya Bhushan as Old Pandit
- Sanjeeta Mukherjee as Mad Woman
- Ketan Rathod as Mojid's Servant
- Guddu Gupta as Ashraf
- Debashish Mondol as Captured Razakar (Pakistan)
- Prodip Ganguly as Sheikh Mujibur Rahman

== Production ==
While writing the film's script, Devvrat researched the topic thoroughly, which included interviews with various journalists, war veterans, and refugees. Filming for The Bastard Child was supposed to take place in West Bengal, but the film was forced to relocate after only 8 days of shooting due to problems with the Federation of Cine Technicians and Workers of Eastern India, as there were issues with the amount of local hands hired to work on the movie. Filming also took place around Delhi and Haryana, and overall filming for The Bastard Child occurred mostly at night. In 2013 Farooq Sheikh was confirmed to be performing in the film, only for rumors to surface that he be replacing Sabyasachi Chakraborty in the movie. Devvrat addressed these rumors in June 2013, stating that Chakraborty was still part of the movie but that his original role had been split into two different characters due to the director wanting to avoid further potential issues with the Federation of Cine Technicians and Workers of Eastern India. The production for The Bastard Child experienced further issues with the film's release, as the Indian Motion Picture Producers Association did not approve of the movie's title, which included the word "bastard". Devvrat responded to the criticism over the title, stating that he did not intend for the word to be seen as offensive.

Of her role in the film, Raima Sen felt that it was "one of the toughest roles she has portrayed on screen in the recent past."

== Reception and awards ==
Critical reception so far has been positive. Live Mint gave a positive review for the movie, which they felt contained "beautifully filmed grief and devastation". Subhash K. Jha also gave a positive review, he stated "It is impossible to believe that this war epic has been directed by a first-time filmmaker. How can a virgin artiste conceive such a vivid portrait of the rape of a civilization?"

The film was banned in Pakistan for its portrayal of the 1971 Bangladesh Liberation War contrary to Pakistan's view.
