= Dharavi Bank =

2022 Indian television series

- Genre: Crime; Drama
- Created by: Sarthak Dasgupta
- Written by: Sarthak Dasgupta; Seneca Mendonca
- Directed by: Samit Kakkad
- Creative director: Gautam Arya
- Starring: Suniel Shetty; Vivek Oberoi; Sonali Kulkarni
- Composers: Tejas Padave; Amar Mohile
- Original language: Hindi
- No. of seasons: 1
- No. of episodes: 10

Production
- Producers: Umesh KR Bhansal; Gautam Arya
- Production location: India
- Cinematography: Vijay Mishra
- Editor: Isam Shaikh
- Camera setup: Multi-camera
- Production company: Zee Studios

Original release
- Network: MX Player
- Release: 19 November 2022 – present

Dharavi Bank is an Indian crime drama television series directed by Samit Kakkad and produced by Zee Studios. It stars Suniel Shetty, Vivek Oberoi, Sonali Kulkarni and Samikssha Batnagar. The series marks Suniel Shetty's OTT debut.

== Cast ==
Cast list credited from original show

- Suniel Shetty as Thalaivan
- Vivek Oberoi as Jayant Gavaskar
- Samiksha Bhatnagar as Irawati “Ira” Gavaskar, Jayant's wife
- Shruti Shrivastav as Sakeena
- Santosh Juvekar as Santosh Mhatre
- Anngad Raaj as Vinayak "Veenu" Gavaskar, JCP Jayant Gavaskar and Irawati's son
- Sonali Kulkarni as Janvi Surve
- Siddharth Menon as Veerbhadra
- Vamsi Krishna as Shiva
- Shantipriya as Bonamma
- Freddy Daruwala as Mahesh
- Luke Kenny as Michael
- Bhavana Rao as Deepa, Thalaivan's daughter
- Nagesh Bhosle as Ghanshyam Mhatre
- Hitesh Bhojraj as undercover police sharpshooter
- Rohit Pathak as Rajan, Thalaivan's son-in-law
- Jaywant Wadkar as Franchis
- Chinmay Mandlekar as Daji Malusare
- Krishnakant Singh Bundela as Muslim Vodoo Man

== Plot ==
The series narrates the rise of Thalaivan (Sunil Shetty) as the most influential person of Dharavi as well as the Godman of many politicians. For political benefit the Chief Minister Janvi Surve (Sonali Kulkarni) calls JCP Jayant Gavaskar (Vivek Oberoi) and orders to kill Thalaivan. Gavaskar takes the order both personal (as Thalaivan killed his child) vengeance and professional assignment. The conflict between Gavaskar's Mumbai police and Thalaivan's gang starts, but some political turns save Thalaivan.

== Filming ==
The series has been shot in the constricted lanes of Dharavi, India’s largest slum.

== Release ==
Dharavi Bank Session 1 streaming started on MX Player from November 19, 2022.

== Episodes ==
No.	Title	Directed by	Written by	Original release date
1	"Dharavi Main Bulaya Hai"	Samit Kakkad	Kevin Luperchio, Prashant Nair	19 November 2022
2	"Thok Doonga Saale Ko"	Samit Kakkad	Kevin Luperchio, Prashant Nair	19 November 2022
3	"Veenu"	Samit Kakkad	Kevin Luperchio, Prashant Nair	19 November 2022
4	"War Room"	Samit Kakkad	Kevin Luperchio, Prashant Nair	19 November 2022
5	"Bhool Bhulaiya"	Samit Kakkad	Kevin Luperchio, Prashant Nair	19 November 2022
6	"Family"	Samit Kakkad	Kevin Luperchio, Prashant Nair	19 November 2022
7	"Make Him Suffer"	Samit Kakkad	Kevin Luperchio, Prashant Nair	19 November 2022
8	"Withdrawal"	Samit Kakkad	Kevin Luperchio, Prashant Nair	19 November 2022
9	"Secrets"	Samit Kakkad	Kevin Luperchio, Prashant Nair	19 November 2022
10	"Koi Bhi Nahi Bachega"	Samit Kakkad	Kevin Luperchio, Prashant Nair	19 November 2022

== Reception ==
Dharavi Bank Season 1 received both positive and negative reviews. Saibal Chatterjee for NDTV gave 2/5 stars and wrote "Dharavi Bank sorely lacks the sort of narrative reserves that can fuel a compelling thriller." Abhimanyu Mathur for Hindustan Times wrote "Dharavi Bank will appeal to some, the ones who like the old-fashioned gangster dramas with over-the-top action. But the show is too old-fashioned and not in a classic way." Archika Khurana for The Times of India gave 3/5 rating and wrote "Suniel Shetty outshines everyone in his OTT debut as the brutal and vivacious gang lord of Dharavi. Right from his serious gaze to the protectiveness of his family and his wearing of the crisp white Mundu, Anna proves to be a perfect fit for the role of Thalavian."

Manik Sharma for Firstpost wrote "The plotline, as a whole, moves with the steady but ultimately predictable pace of a Gangster v Police war where betrayals, rats and spies abound." Shipra Darmwal of LeisureByte concurred, stating that the "twists are predictable" and furthermore the series "does not offer anything new".
