= Priyanka Bose =

Indian actress (born 1982)

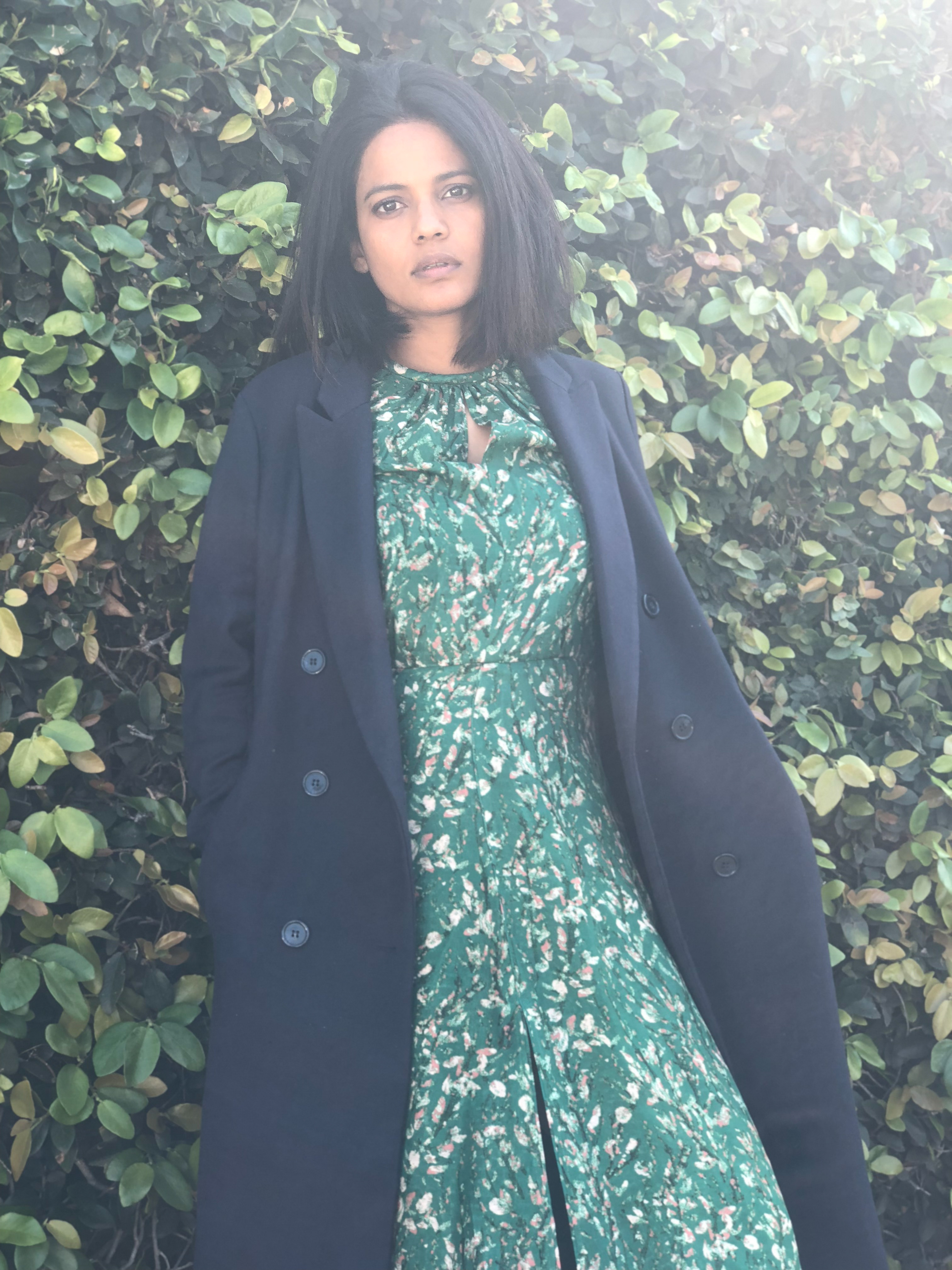
- Born: 1980 (age 45–46); Delhi, India
- Occupation: Actress
- Years active: 2007–present

Priyanka Bose (born 1980) is an actor, theatre artist and producer known for her work in Indian, European and American film, television and theatre. She began her career on stage, and has built a body of work that spans multiple languages, industries and cultural contexts, working with filmmakers and collaborators from India, Italy, Norway, the United Kingdom and the United States. She is known for her performances in Gangor (2010), Lion (2016), The Wheel of Time (2021–2025), Jugnuma: The Fable (2024) and Agra (2023/2025), for which she won the Critics' Choice Award for Best Actress in 2026.

Bose has frequently moved between independent cinema, mainstream productions, international television, theatre and producer-led projects, often portraying characters that challenge conventional cultural, social and gendered archetypes. She alternates between Mumbai and Los Angeles to shoot Indian and international productions.

== Early life and education ==
Bose was born in Delhi, and began her artistic career in theatre, performing in stage productions before transitioning to film and television. Fluent in English, Hindi and Bengali, she developed a practice that would later encompass work across multiple countries and artistic traditions.

== Career ==
=== Early work and theatre ===
Bose's screen career began with appearances in films including Johnny Gaddaar (2007) Sorry Bhai! (2008), Love Sex Aur Dhokha (2010) and Guzaarish (2010). Her first leading role came in Gangor (2010), directed by Italian filmmaker Italo Spinelli and adapted from Mahasweta Devi's short story "Choli Ke Peeche". Her portrayal of the title character earned her the Best Actress award at the New Jersey Independent South Asian Film Festival.

In 2013, Bose toured internationally with Nirbhaya, written and directed by Yaël Farber. Based on the 2012 Delhi gang rape case, the production received international acclaim and won the Scotsman Fringe First Award, the Herald Angel Award and Amnesty International's Freedom of Expression Award at the Edinburgh Festival Fringe.

The same year, she appeared in Tanishq's widely discussed remarriage campaign, which was regarded as a landmark moment in contemporary Indian advertising for its portrayal of a young widow entering a second marriage. The ad was hailed as "path-breaking", "courageous" and "unique", and became a talking point on Twitter and Facebook with thousands of hits on YouTube.

=== International film and television ===
Bose subsequently appeared in Shunyo Awnko opposite Konkona Sen Sharma, Gulaab Gang alongside Madhuri Dixit and Juhi Chawla, and in internationally recognised independent films such as Oass, Oonga and Sold.

In 2016, she co-starred in Garth Davis' Academy Award-nominated film Lion, alongside Nicole Kidman, Dev Patel and Nawazuddin Siddiqui. The same year, she appeared in the Marathi film Half Ticket, for which she won the Zee Chitra Gaurav Puraskar for Best Supporting Actress and received a Filmfare Marathi Award nomination.

Bose expanded her international career through projects including The MisEducation of Bindu (2019), directed by Prarthana Moha and executive produced by the Duplass Brothers; André Øvredal's Norwegian fantasy feature Mortal (2020); and the British television drama The Good Karma Hospital (2017–2022). She has frequently alternated between Mumbai and Los Angeles while working across Indian and international productions.

Alongside acting, Bose founded the production company PaapiPet Pictures, which has produced short films and music videos, including projects for Mikey McCleary and Kailash Kher's musical collective Kailasa.

=== The Wheel of Time ===
From 2021 to 2025, Bose portrayed Alanna Mosvani in Amazon Prime's fantasy series The Wheel of Time, based on Robert Jordan's novels. The role introduced her to a global audience and marked a departure from the maternal and self-sacrificing characters she had often portrayed earlier in her career. Bose described the part as an opportunity to explore a more action-oriented, independent and morally complex character.

=== Jugnuma: The Fable and Agra ===
Bose appeared in Raam Reddy's Jugnuma: The Fable, opposite Manoj Bajpayee. The film premiered in the "Encounters" section of the 74th Berlin International Film Festival in 2024. It was only the second Indian film in three decades to be selected for one of the festival's principal competitive sections. Critics praised Bose's restrained and understated performance.

Her performance as Priti in Kanu Behl's Agra represented a significant turning point in her career. The film premiered at the Directors' Fortnight section of the 2023 Cannes Film Festival before its Indian theatrical release in 2025. Behl said he conceived the role with Bose in mind during the screenwriting process, describing her as the only actor he envisioned while developing the character. According to both Behl and Bose, the role demanded a substantial departure from the kinds of characters she had previously portrayed, allowing her to explore a more psychologically complex and morally ambiguous figure.

Bose has spoken about being drawn to the emotional depth of Priti, and to the film's position within independent cinema despite its limited resources. Critics highlighted the performance as one of the film's strengths, with reviewers noting the character's agency, resilience and emotional complexity. For her portrayal of Priti, Bose won the Critics' Choice Award for Best Actress in 2026.

== Filmography ==
Year	Film	Role	Language	Notes
2007	Johnny Gaddaar	Ola-Ola main dancer	Hindi	
2008	Sorry Bhai!	Shruti	Hindi	
2010	Love Sex aur Dhokha		Hindi	
2010	Gangor	Gangor	Bengali	"Best Actress" at the New Jersey Independent South Asian Film Festival
2010	Guzaarish	Singer at the bar	Hindi	
2011	Padduram	Mrs. Menon	Hindi	
2012	Oass	Madam	Hindi	
2012	Uproot	Sharmi	English, Hindi, Bengali	(short)
2013	Shunyo Awnko	Jhilik Bose	Bengali	
2013	Oonga	Oongamma	Hindi	
2013	Yeh Jawaani Hai Deewani	Sex worker	Hindi	
2013	Glass Bottom Boat		English	(short)
2014	Gulaab Gang	Sandhya	Hindi	
2014	Sold	Monica	English	
2016	Lion	Kamla Munshi	English, Hindi, Bengali	
2016	Devi (Goddess)		English	(short)
2016	Half Ticket	Aai	Marathi	"Best Supporting Actress" at Zee Chitra Gaurav Awards 2017, "Best Actress" at Sakal Premiere Awards 2017, Sanskruti Kala Darpan 2017, "Best Actor in a Supporting Role (Female)" at Filmfare 2017
2018	The MisEducation of Bindu		English	Directed by Prarthana Mohan. Produced by Edward Timpe, and Duplass Brothers as executive producers.
2018	Mortal	Hathaway	English	
2018	The Good Karma Hospital	Dr Aisha Ray	English	Season 3
2018	Ascharya Fuck It	Kanta	Hindi	Lead
2019	Parchhayee	Priti	Hindi	Web series by ZEE5
2020	What Are The Odds	Paloma	Hindi	
2020	Pareeksha	Radhika	Hindi	Released on ZEE5
2020	Sadak 2	Nandini	Hindi	Released on Disney+ Hotstar
2021–2025	The Wheel of Time	Alanna Mosvani	English	TV series produced for Amazon Prime Video
2023	Agra	Priti	Hindi	Premiered at Directors’ Fortnight section of the Cannes and screened at the BIFF in October 2023.
2023	Kaala	Vandana	Hindi	TV series produced for Disney+ Hotstar
2023	The Lady Killer	Gajra	Hindi	
2024	The Fable	Nandini	Hindi	
