= Prabhakar Gupte =

Indian cricketer

Prabhakar Gupte (31 January 1910 – death date unknown) was an Indian cricketer. He was a right-handed batsman who played for Maharashtra. He was born in Poona.

Gupte made a single first-class appearance for the side, during the 1937–38 season, against Western India. From the lower-middle order, he scored a single run in the first innings in which he batted, and 2 runs in the second.
