= Pareeksha (2019 film) =

2020 Indian drama film directed by Prakash Jha

- Poster
- Directed by: Prakash Jha
- Written by: Prakash Jha
- Produced by: Prakash Jha
- Starring: Adil Hussain; Priyanka Bose; Sanjay Suri; Shourya Deep; Shubham Jha
- Cinematography: Sachin K. Krishn
- Edited by: Santosh Mandal
- Music by: Advait Nemlekar
- Production company: Prakash Jha Productions
- Distributed by: ZEE5
- Release dates: November 2019 (IFFI); 6 August 2020 (India)
- Running time: 102 minutes
- Country: India
- Language: Hindi

Pareeksha – The Final Test is a 2020 Indian Hindi-language drama film directed by Prakash Jha. The film stars Adil Hussain, Priyanka Bose, Sanjay Suri, Shourya Deep and Shubham Jha in the lead roles. The film takes on the education system in India and revolves around the story of an ordinary rickshaw driver in Ranchi, Jharkhand, who aspires and dreams of providing a maximum possible quality education to his son by making arrangements for him to study at a private English medium school.

The film is based on the real-life story of IPS officer Abhayanand, who teaches and coaches kids in a village in Bihar affected by the Naxal to help them pass in the IIT-JEE exams. Initially intended for theatrical release, the film was premiered through ZEE5 on 6 August 2020.

== Cast ==
- Adil Hussain as Bucchi
- Priyanka Bose as Radhika
- Sanjay Suri as SP Kailash Anand
- Shourya Deep as Gaurav Bhatia
- Shubham Jha as Bulbul

== Release ==
The film was premiered at the 50th International Film Festival of India in the Indian Panorama section in 2019. In June 2020, the film was scheduled for its premiere screening at the London Indian Film Festival but was postponed due to technical issues.

It was supposed to have its theatrical release but was called off due to the COVID-19 pandemic in India. In June 2020, Zee5 digital platform announced that the film was released on 6 August 2020 via the platform. This also marked Prakash Jha's maiden collaboration with a digital OTT platform.

== Reception ==
British filmmaker Peter Webber praised the storyline of the film stating that the film resembles something similar to the evergreen 1948 Italian film Bicycle Thieves. Saibal Chatterjee of NDTV rated the film 3.5 out of 5 stars stating that the film was well intentioned and praised the clinical performance of Adil Hussain.
