= Neelima Gupte =

Indian physicist

- Education: Bombay University, IIT Bombay, SUNY Stony Brook
- Scientific career
- Fields: Nonlinear Dynamics
- Workplaces: Indian Institute of Technology Madras, University of Hyderabad, Pune University

Neelima M. Gupte is an Indian physicist. She obtained her B.Sc. from Bombay University in 1976, M.Sc. from IIT Bombay in 1978 and Ph.D. from SUNY at Stony Brook in 1983. She has subsequently worked at the University of Hyderabad, and was on the faculty of Pune University from 1985 to 1993. She is presently Professor in the Department of Physics, IIT Madras. Her research interests lie in the field of nonlinear dynamics, and chaos.

Results obtained by her and her collaborators include the phase transition analogs of the thermodynamics of multifractals, the method of impulsive synchronisation and the enhancement of the efficiency of load-bearing and communication networks. Her current research interests include the analysis of spatiotemporal intermittency in extended systems, chaotic advection and the study of networks. In addition to her academic interests, she has also participated in the activities of the 'Women in Physics' group of the International Union of Pure and Applied Physics. She is included in Lilavati's Daughters, the compendium of biographical and autobiographical essays on Women Scientists of India.
