= James Liddy =

Irish poet (1934–2008)

- Born: 1 July 1934; Dublin, Ireland
- Died: 4 November 2008 (aged 74)
- Occupation: Poet

James Liddy (1 July 1934 – 4 November 2008) was an Irish poet, born in Dublin, Ireland. He is best known for his collections In A Blue Smoke (1964), Blue Mountain (1968), Orpheus in the Ice-Cream Parlour (1975) and Bascinn (1977). The first volume of Liddy's memoir, The Doctor's House: An Autobiography, was published in 2004.

He died on 4 November 2008.

== Bibliography ==
- Irish Poetry of Faith and Doubt:The Cold Heaven, p. 187, ed. John F. Deane, Wolfhound Press, 1990.
