= Chitaman Gupte =

Indian cricketer (1916–1994)

Chitaman Gupte (1916 – 24 April 1994) was an Indian cricketer who played for Maharashtra. He died in Pune.

Gupte made a single first-class appearance for the side, during the 1940–41 season, against Baroda. From the opening order, he scored 32 runs in the first innings in which he batted, and 21 runs in the second.

He took a single catch, that of Hemu Adhikari.
