= Morya (film) =

2011 Indian film by Avadhoot Gupte

Morya - Marathi Movie
- Theatrical release poster
- Directed by: Avdhoot Gupte
- Produced by: Avdhoot Gupte; Atul Kamble
- Starring: see below
- Music by: Avadhoot Gupte
- Release date: 19 August 2011
- Country: India
- Language: Marathi

Morya is a Marathi movie released on 19 August 2011. The film was produced by Avdhoot Gupte along with Atul Kamble.

== Cast ==
- Santosh Juvekar
- Chinmay Mandlekar
- Pari Telang
- Spruha Joshi
- Dilip Prabhavalkar
- Ganesh Yadav
- Yaser Yazdani
- Pushkar Shrotri
- Sunil Ranade

== Soundtrack ==
The music is produced by Avadhoot Gupte and co-directed by Amit Sonmale.

=== Track listing ===
| No. | Title | Length |
|---|---|---|
| 1. | "Morya Title Song" |
| 2. | "Aarti" |
| 3. | "Dev Chorala Slow Version" |
| 4. | "Dev Chorla" |
| 5. | "Email Kaal Internet Var Kela" |
| 6. | "Govinda Re" |
| 7. | "Hey Lambodar" |
| 8. | "Utsavatla Raja Utsav" |
