= Narayan Murlidhar Gupte =

Indian poet and scholar (1872–1947)

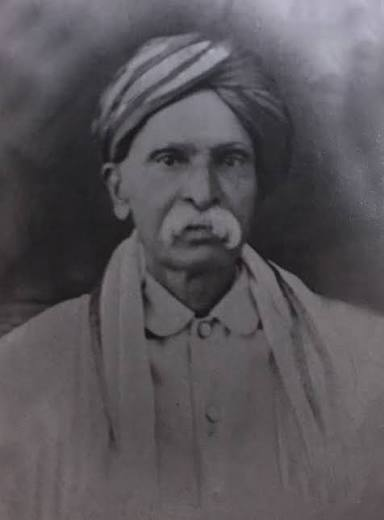
- Born: 1 June 1872; Malkapur, Buldhana district, Varhad (Berar)
- Died: 30 August 1947 (aged 75); Chhindwara
- Writing career
- Pen name: Bee
- Language: English; Sanskrit; Marathi

Narayan Murlidhar Gupte (1 June 1872 – 30 August 1947), widely known by his pseudonym Bee, was an Indian poet and scholar of English, Sanskrit and Marathi literature.

== Early life ==
Gupte was born on 1 June 1872 in Malkapur, located in the Buldhana district of Varhad (Berar). His ancestral roots trace back to Vashi, a village situated in the Kulaba district. His family traditionally held the hereditary position of Kulkarni (village accountant) across five to seven villages, including Vashi and Pen.

Around 1851, Gupte's father, Murlidharpant, relocated to Varhad, where he initially entered government service before transitioning to a career in law. Gupte's mother was Rajubai, who was also known as Laxmibai. Gupte was the eldest child in his family, growing up alongside four brothers and three sisters.

== Education and career ==
Owing to his father's legal profession, Gupte lived in the towns of Yavatmal and Wani. He completed his primary schooling in Yavatmal and subsequently moved to Amravati for his further school education. However, his education was cut short before he could complete his matriculation due to the sudden demise of his father. As the eldest sibling, the entire responsibility of the household fell upon him, compelling him to take up employment as a government clerk.

== Literary career and style ==
Gupte began composing poetry around the age of 18 or 19. His debut poem, Pranaypatrika, was written in 1891. In the initial phase of his literary career, his poems were primarily featured in daily newspapers. He achieved widespread recognition in 1911 with the publication of his highly acclaimed poem Vedgane, which he wrote under his pen name "Bee". The majority of his subsequent poems were published in the monthly magazine Manoranjan, drawing a large following of literary enthusiasts.

=== Influences and themes ===
Gupte's poetic works frequently demonstrate a leaning towards mysticism. His writings were profoundly shaped by the traditional Indian philosophy of optimism (Anandvadi). His linguistic style and thematic approach reflect a deep study of Sanskrit poetry, alongside the literary legacy of Marathi saint-poets such as Dnyaneshwar, Mukteshwar, and Tukaram. Furthermore, his poetry shows the distinct influence of traditional Marathi historical and oral literature, including powadas (ballads), padas, and bakhars (chronicles).

== Publications ==
In 1934, Gupte published his first anthology of poems, titled Phulanchi Onjal. The introduction for this debut collection was written by the noted writer P. K. Atre. A second edition of the anthology was published in 1941, which expanded on the original text by incorporating eleven of his later poems under the title Pikle Paan. Following these initial releases, the collection went on to see six additional editions.

== Personal life ==
In his youth, Gupte married the daughter of Martandrao Pradhan. Following her early death, he married for a second time, wedding Laxmibai Sule of Yavatmal. Gupte had four children: a son named Dattatraya and three daughters. He died on 30 August 1947 in Chhindwara.
