= RejctX =

Indian web series

- Genre: Mystery; Thriller
- Created by: Goldie Behl
- Written by: Goldie Behl; Novoneel Chakraborty; Nandini Gupta; Aarsh Vora
- Directed by: Goldie Behl
- Starring: Sumeet Vyas; Kubbra Sait; Masi Wali; Ridhi Khakhar; Anisha Victor
- Theme music composer: Sneha Khanwalkar
- Country of origin: India
- Original language: Hindi
- No. of seasons: 2
- No. of episodes: 18

Production
- Producer: Goldie Behl
- Cinematography: Himanshu Dubey
- Running time: 45 Minutes

Original release
- Network: ZEE5
- Release: 25 July 2019

RejctX is an Indian web series that revolves around a group of students of an elite school, and millennial issues like gender fluidity, body shaming, personality disorders, and porn addiction, and their rap band. It was first launched for the ZEE5 network on 25 July 2019. The series stars Sumeet Vyas, Kubbra Sait, Ahmed Masi Wali, Ridhi Khakhar, Anisha Victor, Pooja Shetty and Ayush Khurrana as the primary cast.

== Cast ==
=== Season 1 ===
- Sumeet Vyas as Farhan Hussain
- Kubbra Sait as Anushka Rao
- Ahmed Masi Wali as Aarav Sharma
- Anisha Victor as Kiara Tiwari
- Ridhi Khakhar as Parnomitra Rai
- Talay Sanguandikul as Steve
- Sumeet Vyas

=== Season 2 ===
- Sumeet Vyas as Farhan Hussain
- Ahmed Masi Wali as Aarav Sharma and Jai Krishna/Jackie (dual role)
- Anisha Victor as Kiara Tiwari
- Ridhi Khakhar as Pornomitra Rai
- Esha Gupta as Rene Ray
- Saadhika Syal as Sehmat Ali
- Prabhneet Singh as Harwinder Sandhu
- Ayush Khurana as Maddy
- Pooja Sundar Shetty as Misha Patel
- Tanvi Shinde as Yesha Tiwari
- Khalid Siddiqui as Prithviraj Sharma
- Shaan Groverr as Sid

== Release ==
RejctX was released on 25 July 2019, and a private screening was also held for the same, which witnessed celebrities like Sonali Bendre, Sussanne Khan, Kunal Kapoor among others, upon release RejctX was received positively and became a quick hit.

== Season 2 ==
In late 2019, ZEE5 renewed the show for Season 2 with Goldie Behl set to return as the show runner. The season 2 of RejctX was released on 14 May 2020, but the web series leaked on the piracy giants like Tamil Rockers on the very next day of release.

== Episodes ==
=== Season 1 ===
No.	Title	Directed by	Written by	Original release date
1	"Now You See Him, Now You Don't"	Goldie Behl	Goldie Behl; Novoneel Chakraborty	25 July 2019
As the RejctX get ready for their performance at a music competition, they realise that Aarav, their lead singer, hasn't turned up. They decide to go ahead without him. However, their gig is disrupted when a body suddenly hangs loose right in the middle of the stage creating chaos at the venue. Meanwhile, a flashback gives a sneak peek into the complicated lives of the youngsters.
2	"The Lady in Red"	Goldie Behl	Goldie Behl; Novoneel Chakraborty	25 July 2019
Disturbed by Aarav’s disappearance, Kiara meets Hussain and is surprised when he mentions that Aarav has gone to India to meet his mother. A flashback to the past reveals why Parnomitra seeks revenge on him. Meanwhile, Kiara thinks Steve might have something to do with Aarav’s disappearance.
3	"Who's that girl?"	Goldie Behl	Goldie Behl; Novoneel Chakraborty	1 August 2019
When Kiara and Sehmat see Steve and Parnomitra together, they decide to spy on her and come up with a plan to get access to the messages on her phone. In the past, during the trials for cheerleaders, Parnomitra insults the girls which irks Kiara. Meanwhile, Aarav and Maddy fight for a place in the basketball team. Later, when Aarav sees Anushka making out with her coach, he gets furious and vents out his anger in the form of a rap and records it.
4	"Mind Your Game"	Goldie Behl	Goldie Behl; Novoneel Chakraborty	1 August 2019
During the basketball match, Maddy gets a porn clip, featuring his mother, which disturbs him. This clip also results into a fight between him and Aarav. However, Maddy overcomes his problems and helps his team win the match. Later, Harry and Anushka encourage Aarav to take part in an underground rap battle but he fails miserably.
5	"Unfinished Business"	Goldie Behl	Goldie Behl; Novoneel Chakraborty	8 August 2019
Misha fails to remember the previous night's incidents the morning after she makes out with Sehmat. When Kiara confronts Sehmat, she reveals her story including her sexual orientation. An incident from past reveals how Aarav finds a great song written by Sehmat and how his performance turns into a hit. This gives him the confidence to build a band called RejctX.
6	"Thank You Ma'am"	Goldie Behl	Goldie Behl; Novoneel Chakraborty	8 August 2019
Aarav is shocked to know that Harry is responsible for his situation. A peek into the past reveals how Hussain was desperate to uncover RejctX. Harry finds out about a competition and the RejctX decide to participate in it. Trouble begins when Hussain lands up at the competition and almost uncovers the identity of the band's members. Later, Kiara and Aarav have a heartfelt discussion and resolve their differences.
7	"Going Down"	Goldie Behl	Goldie Behl; Novoneel Chakraborty	15 August 2020
When Kiara visits Anushka’s house to know about her discussion with Hussain, she sees Harry and gets suspicious about him. Meanwhile, Aarav tries to find some help to rescue him, but his efforts go in vain. The story moves back in time to show how Anushka lured Aarav and distracted him from studies, friends, and music. Later, when Kiara’s old picture is leaked in the college and she is body shamed, she blames Aarav for the mess.
8	"Gotcha"	Goldie Behl	Goldie Behl; Novoneel Chakraborty	15 August 2020
Once Kiara finds out about Aarav’s kidnapping, she informs the gang who then decide to inform Anushka, the senior most, trustworthy person of the group. It is revealed how Aarav learnt about Anushka’s affair with his father and he began avoiding her. Later, when RejctX gets a wild card entry into a competition, the members realise that they would need Aarav in the band. Kiara tries to resolve her differences with Aarav and convince him to join the band.
9	"Back to Zero"	Goldie Behl	Goldie Behl; Novoneel Chakraborty	22 August 2020
The RejctX go behind Harry who narrates his story of how a mysterious woman lured him into doing things. Aarav is finally rescued and taken to the hospital where the band meets him and thanks Hussain for his help. Hussain calls the cops to arrest Anushka, but she manages to save herself. Aarav struggles with withdrawal symptoms and finds a gun.
10	"Bang Bang"	Goldie Behl	Goldie Behl; Novoneel Chakraborty	22 August 2020
Aarav is back with RejctX but is struggling to deal with his withdrawal symptoms. He confronts Anushka who discloses the truth behind her relationship with his father. Later, when RejctX get ready for the final performance, they find Aarav missing and decide to perform without him. Later, Aarav gets furious and storms towards the school with the gun after his father confesses his crime.

=== Season 2 ===
No.	Title	Directed by	Written by	Original release date
1	"It's gonna be a long, long night"	Nupur Asthana	Devika Bhagat	17 April 2020
At the school’s Prom party, Aarav meets Kiara on the terrace where they share a sweet moment before Aarav pushes Kiara off and she hangs from the ledge. Officer Rene visits the school to investigate Anushka Rao’s murder where she discovers that she was dating Aarav. Yesha, Kiara’s cousin beats Maddy at swimming and Sid is shot on campus. Aarav gets a message from X.
2	"The X in RejctX"	Nupur Asthana	Devika Bhagat	17 April 2020
Rene investigates Anuskha Rao’s case claiming that it is a murder. All fingers point towards Aarav Sharma. In an MMA event, Maddy wins the match which he was supposed to lose which puts Harry in a spot. To free Harry from the goons, X offers a way out. Aarav has a chance encounter with Jackie, his Doppelgänger.
3	"Three More Down"	Nupur Asthana	Devika Bhagat	17 April 2020
Officer Rene is admonished and taken off from the Jefferson School Case by her senior. Misha confronts Sehmat about her feelings for Sehmat. In a slam poetry event Sehmat is attacked by a girl in the washroom. Misha comes to her rescue and a fight ensues leading to something undesirable.
4	"You've Got A Visitor"	Nupur Asthana	Devika Bhagat	17 April 2020
Rejctx are on their way to dispose of a body when they run into Rene.Harry and Parnomitra ex-pose Kim using Bitch Board. Exposed and expelled from school Kim can’t take it. She commits suicide on live camera with everyone watching. Guilty, Harry and Parnomitra shut down Bitch board.
5	"The Burden of Truth"	Nupur Asthana	Devika Bhagat	17 April 2020
X messages Aarav, Maddy, Harry, Parnomita, Misha and Sehmat to come to a dingy place. They are surprised to see each other. They soon realise that all of them are being blackmailed by the same X. X has a job for them, something sinister that they can’t even imagine but there is no way out.
6	"Surprise, surprise!"	Nupur Asthana	Devika Bhagat	17 April 2020
The plot thickens. Everything is at stake. Aarav gets closer to Jackie to investigate. Hussain also finds himself in the thick of things. Meanwhile, Sid escapes from the hospital and Rene follows him. X is on top but the Rejctx are fighting hard. A shocking revelation comes to the fore.
7	"The End Is The Beginning."	Nupur Asthana	Devika Bhagat	17 April 2020
The finger of suspicion points towards Hussain. It shines a light on his own entrapment. Aarav and Kiara confront Hussain. Rene works with the Rejctx to hunt for X. The true identity of X is finally revealed.
8	"The Why behind X"	Nupur Asthana	Devika Bhagat	17 April 2020
Against all odds the Rejctx need to find their way out of this web of lies, deceit and blackmail. Does their friendship pre-vail? Is there a resolution? Who comes out winning, them or X??
