= Unpaused =

- Release poster
- Directed by: Tannishtha Chatterjee; Raj & DK; Nitya Mehra; Nikkhil Advani; Avinash Arun
- Written by: Raj & DK; Devika Bhagat; Nitya Mehra; Reshu Nath; Vidur Nauriyal; Shubham; Sanyuktha Chawla Shaikh
- Produced by: Raj & DK; Madhu Bhojwani; Monisha Advani; Baisakhi Nair; Sanjeevkumar Nair
- Starring: Gulshan Devaiah; Sumeet Vyas; Saiyami Kher; Richa Chadda; Abhishek Banerjee; Ratna Pathak Shah; Ishwak Singh; Geetika Vidya Ohlyan; Rinku Rajguru; Lillete Dubey
- Cinematography: Pankaj Kumar; Jay Pinak Oza; John Jacob Payyapalli; Navagat Prakash; Kaushal Shah
- Edited by: Sanyukta Kaza; Sachin Kunal; Sagar Manik; Sumeet Kotian; Dharmendra Kakarala; Antara Lahiri; Manas Mittal
- Music by: Tanishk Bagchi; Payal Dev; Parth Parekh; Shishir A Samant; Gaurav Kadu
- Production companies: d2r Films; Emmay Entertainment; Pritish Nandy Communications; Reverie Entertainment; Pink Window Productions
- Distributed by: Amazon Prime Video
- Release date: 18 December 2020
- Running time: 113 minutes
- Country: India
- Language: Hindi

Unpaused is an Indian Hindi-language anthology film consisting of five short segments directed by Raj & DK, Nitya Mehra, Nikkhil Advani, Tannishtha Chatterjee and Avinash Arun. With an ensemble cast, the stories revolve around lives of people impacted by the COVID-19 pandemic. It premiered on 18 December 2020 on Amazon Prime Video.

A sequel series titled Unpaused: Naya Safar, with segments directed by Nupur Asthana, Ayappa KM, Ruchir Arun, Shikha Makan, and Nagraj Manjule, and produced by Pink Window Productions, Early Man Film, Chalkboard Entertainment, The Three Film Company, and Aatpat Films, was released on Prime Video in January 21, 2022.

== Cast ==
Glitch (Raj & DK)

- Gulshan Devaiah as Ahan Awasthi
- Saiyami Kher as Ayesha Hussain

Apartment (Nikkhil Advani)

- Richa Chadda as Devika Khanna
- Ishwak Singh as Chirag
- Sumeet Vyas as Sahil Khanna

Rat A Tat (Tannishtha Chatterjee)

- Rinku Rajguru as Priyanka
- Lillete Dubey as Archna

Vishaanu (Avinash Arun)

- Abhishek Banerjee as Manish
- Geetika Vidya Ohlyan as Seema

Chaand Mubarak (Nitya Mehra)

- Ratna Pathak Shah as Uma
- Shardul Bharadwaj as Rafique (Auto Driver)

== Soundtrack ==
Unpaused

Soundtrack album by Tanishk Bagchi, Payal Dev, Parth Parekh, Shishir A Samant and Gaurav Kadu
- Released: 11 December 2020
- Recorded: 2020
- Genre: Amazon Original Movie Soundtrack
- Length: 19:42
- Language: Hindi
- Label: Amazon Music
External audio
- Official Audio Jukebox on YouTube

The music was composed by Tanishk Bagchi, Payal Dev, Parth Parekh, Shishir A Samant and Gaurav Kadu with lyrics written by Rashmi Virag, Kunaal Vermaa, Ginny Diwan, Traditional and Gaurav Kadu.

Track listing
No.	Title	Lyrics	Music	Singer(s)	Length
1.	"Nayi Dhoop"	Rashmi Virag	Tanishk Bagchi	Zara Khan	3:21
2.	"Ummeed Hai"	Kunaal Vermaa	Payal Dev	Jubin Nautiyal	2:42
3.	"Badarva"	Ginny Diwan	Parth Parekh	Madhubanti Bagchi	1:57
4.	"Chaap Tilak"	Traditional (Amir Khusrau)	Shishir A Samant	Shishir A Samant, Sunil Kamath	3:10
5.	"Nayi Dhoop" (Reprise)	Rashmi Virag	Tanishk Bagchi	Zara Khan	3:19
6.	"Mujh Mai Hai Tu"	Gaurav Kadu	Gaurav Kadu	Fiddlecraft, Gaurav Kadu	3:15
7.	"Rastey"	Gaurav Kadu	Gaurav Kadu	Fiddlecraft, Gaurav Kadu	1:58
Total length:					19:42

== Critical reception ==
Debasree Purkayastha of The Hindu mentioned that the film has "a stirring ensemble of slice-of-life tales that dwell on the common themes of loneliness, love and hope." Saibal Chatterjee from NDTV wrote: "As a freewheeling rumination on loneliness, distress and lingering hope, the anthology, buoyed by a slew of terrific performances, is a pertinent commentary on a pandemic and its depredations."

Nandini Ramnath of Scroll.in praised the performances in the film but was critical of the treatment. Writing for The Indian Express, Shubhra Gupta noted that the film mixes different themes like loneliness and isolation "with news that has made headlines in this terrible virus-laden year, with average results." Anna M. M. Vetticad wrote: "Unpaused is important because it serves to chronicle this slice of history. It helps that it is also an enjoyable, insightful affair."
