= Kil Dil =

Kill Dil or Kill Dill (lit. 'Kill Heart') may refer to:

- Kill Dil, an Indian comedy film
- Kill Dill, an Indian television series

== See also ==
- Killer Dill, a 1947 American comedy film
