= Four More Shots Please! =

Indian web series

- Promotional poster
- Created by: Rangita Pritish Nandy
- Written by: Devika Bhagat; Ishita Moitra
- Directed by: Anu Menon (Season 1); Nupur Asthana (Season 2); Joyeeta Patpatia (Season 3)
- Starring: Kirti Kulhari; Sayani Gupta; Bani J Maanvi Gagroo
- Music by: Mikey McCleary
- Country of origin: India
- Original language: English
- No. of seasons: 4
- No. of episodes: 37

Production
- Producers: Pritish Nandy, Rangita Pritish Nandy
- Cinematography: Neha Parti Matiyani (season 1-2), Sanket Shah (Season 3)
- Editors: Antara Lahiri (Season 1); Jabeen Merchant (Season 2); Arindam Ghatak (Season 3)
- Running time: 28–45 minutes
- Production company: Pritish Nandy Communications Ltd

Original release
- Network: Amazon Prime Video
- Release: 25 January 2019 – 19 December 2025

Four More Shots Please! is an Indian comedy-drama streaming television series on Amazon Prime Video directed by Anu Menon and Nupur Asthana. The series follows the story of four unapologetically flawed women (two in their 30s and two in their early 20s) as they live, love, make mistakes and discover what really makes them tick through friendship and shots of tequila in millennial Mumbai. The series is Amazon Prime Video's first all-women-protagonist Indian original starring Kirti Kulhari, Sayani Gupta, Bani J, and Maanvi Gagroo.

Reviewers have referred to the show as a desi version of Sex and the City. The first season was one of the top three most-watched Amazon Original Series from India in 2019, and season two was called "the most-watched Indian show on the platform" in May 2020. Shortly after season 2 was released, Amazon announced that season 3 was in the works. Season 3 premiered on 21 October 2022. The final season premiered on 19 December 2025.

== Cast ==
=== Main ===
- Kirti Kulhari as Anjana Menon "Anj", a lawyer and divorced mother.
- Sayani Gupta as Damini Rizvi Roy "Dee", an investigative journalist & host of DEEfiant podcast.
- Bani J as Umang Singh "Mangs", owner of Umami gym.
- Maanvi Gagroo as Siddhi Patel "Sids", a single child from a wealthy family.

=== Recurring ===
- Dino Morea as Rohan Wanse
- Lisa Ray as Samara Kapoor
- Milind Soman as Dr. Aamir Warsi
- Jiya Lakhiani as Arya Menon Khanna
- Neil Bhoopalam as Varun Khanna
- Prateik Smita Patil as Jeh Wadia
- Ankur Rathee as Arjun Nair
- Paras Tomar as Mohit Mehta
- Simone Singh as Sneha Patel
- Amrita Puri as Kavya Arora
- Sapna Pabbi as Akanksha Moitra
- Rajeev Siddhartha as Mihir Shah
- Sameer Kochhar as Shashank Bose
- Prabal Panjabi as Amit Mishra
- Shibani Dandekar as Sushmita Sengupta
- Padma Damodaran as Aparna Sahukar
- Monica Dogra as Devyani Rana (cameo)
- Anuradha Chandan as Amina Rizvi Roy
- Madhu Anand Chandhock as Mrs. Singh
- Mohit Chauhan as Mahesh Roy
- Nimisha Mehta as Myra
- Gaurav Sharma as Vinil Verma
- Jim Sarbh as Sean Lobo
- Rohan Vinod Mehra as Dhananjay Deshpande
- Sushant Singh as Rajan Malhotra
- Shilpa Shukla as Meher
- Akshay Bindra as Dhruv
- Kunal Roy Kapoor as Ashokaditya "Ash" Rizvi Roy

== Episodes ==
=== Series overview ===
Series	Episodes	Originally released	Rating
1	10	25 January 2019	3.2/5
2	10	17 April 2020	3.5/5
3	10	21 October 2022	3.0/5
4	7	19 December 2025	TBA

=== Season 1 (2019) ===
No. overall	No. in season	Title	Directed by	Written by	Original release date
1	1	"Ambitious. Prude. Feminist. Slut."	Anu Menon	Devika Bhagat	25 January 2019
Damini's legal defamation cases seem to be piling up. The board of directors, led by Uma Parekh, gives her an ultimatum that she needs to change her strategy or the company will sink in losses. She tells them that she's got it under control. However, all hinges on the final hearing of a crucial court case which is in Anjana's hands. Anjana drops Arya off to school and has an interesting exchange with the other mothers. Sneha accompanies Siddhi to a fortune teller who predicts some wonderful news for Siddhi! Umang has a sweaty encounter with a fellow trainer. Sneha supervises Siddhi's vocal lessons all in a bid to fill up a perfect marriage resume. But not all goes according to Sneha'a liking. Varun drops by to pick Arya up and shares an important development in his life with Anjana. Anjana didn't see it coming. Umang has an accidental run in with a starry client at her gym which leaves her embarrassed. The Board is making Damini's life tough by censoring her stories. All in all, a disaster week for our girls!
2	2	"Strong Girls Don't Break."	Anu Menon	Devika Bhagat	25 January 2019
Anjana finally meets Varun's new girlfriend. Siddhi goes on a blind date set up by her mother. A gym client can't seem to keep his hands to himself but Umang gives him a lesson he'll never forget.
3	3	"Long Way From Ludhiana."	Anu Menon	Devika Bhagat	25 January 2019
Anjana has her hands full. Siddhi's got cam-girl on her mind but isn't sure if she can take the next step. Samara and Umang take their work-outs to the next level. Akanksha takes charge and Damini loses control.
4	4	"Ex Why Zzz"	Anu Menon	Devika Bhagat	25 January 2019
Anjana has a surprise visitor who can't seem to stop singing praises for her former husband. Arya has some uncomfortable questions to ask her mother which takes us into Anjana's past and her reasons for getting hitched to Varun. Siddhi clicks on the link Mohit sent her. The link leaves her scandalised! Akanksha is taking charge slowly and steadily at Investigator.com and holds a briefing with the team with Damini present. Things get tense between Damini and her as she continues to fan the fire. Umang has another session with her high profile client and this time, she finds a way to win her client's trust over with a unique technique. Siddhi discusses the online link with her new found bestie, Mohit. Sneha catches Siddhi and Mohit together and jumps to conclusions about their relationship prematurely. The girls hit the bar. Only this time, they have four very charming boys to deal with. Damini shares an after work drink with Jeh and they seem to be drawing closer. Damini's surprise visitor is back and this time, they have company in Kutta. Umang and her client get together for a glass of wine post their work out till things take a surprise turn. Anjana gets called to work in the midst of planning Arya's birthday party by her boss. But when she returns, there's a surprise waiting for her! The birthday party is a huge success with Varun and Kavya present as well. The only one who is not enjoying herself is Anjana. When things come to a head with Varun, Anjana needs to take control of her life and with the help of the girls, decides to move on. In the most unpredictable way!
5	5	"Love Her. Hate Her."	Anu Menon	Devika Bhagat	25 January 2019
Siddhi and Sneha's strained relationship comes to a head. Miss VeeVee is excited for her first meet and greet. Umang and Samara take the next big step in their relationship. Damini has a breakdown.
6	6	"Fuck This Bar."	Anu Menon	Devika Bhagat	25 January 2019
Flash back to three years ago when Siddhi, Umang, Damini and Anjana meet for the first time. Siddhi is going through a personal crisis because someone close to her has passed away. Damini is just making her mark in the world of journalism after winning a big award and there's the promise of a first round funding for her start-up courtesy Uma Parekh. Umang's first encounter in the big city of Bombay from Ludhiana is for a trainer job in a gym. The interview with the gym manager is clearly a disaster. Anjana returns home after a long day's work to find Varun, for the umpteenth time, having a football game session with his friends without a care in the world for her or the baby. This can only go one way. And that way is down. Jeh is having a bit of a personal crisis too when he decides to say goodbye to Myra, his girlfriend, when he catches her cosying up to another man. Everyone, except Damini, is heading into disaster and is also heading into Truck Bar serendipitously at the same time. In current time, Damini is feverishly investigating her troll story when Uma calls upon her to break some not-so-good news which leaves Damini hurt and fuming. Anjana can't seem to get her mind off her young, new intern and has a bit of an embarrassing run in with him in her office. Umang and her high profile personal training client go undercover for some fun. Siddhi is enjoying her new found passion that no one knows about just yet. Damini consults Anjana on how to deal with the huge blow she has just received from Uma and her board. The four girls reminisce about how they had met in the washroom of Truck Bar three years ago. Including being locked up in the backyard by someone they least expected!
7	7	"Gone Girls."	Anu Menon	Devika Bhagat	25 January 2019
Damini gets threatened by an unknown person for her undercover story. The girls take off to Goa to bring in Damini's birthday. Umang pays a surprise visit to someone while the girls wonder where she's disappeared to. The girls have a blast in Goa. They head to the flea market, get drunk and then pass out on the beach only to wake up to the countdown for the Rewind Music Festival. Their very reason for coming to Goa. Through the festival, the girls go their own ways and land up meeting people they least expect to meet. Damini's situation in her own company is getting more and more difficult with Akanksha closing in on her. Things spiral out of control all through the night and the girls wake up the next morning next to people, not knowing what went down the night before.
8	8	"Fam-Jam-Wham-Bam"	Anu Menon	Devika Bhagat	25 January 2019
Damini wakes up the next morning in Jeh's villa in Goa and catches up with a long lost friend. Umang and the girls tease Siddhi about the night before till Siddhi reveals an unknown secret about Umang to the group. Jeh invites everyone to his parents' 40th wedding anniversary party and decides to call in Damini's birthday at the same time. Arjun can't seem to stay away from Anjana. Damini meets Jeh's family for the first time and they end up embarrassing her. Siddhi confides in Mohit about what happened between Mihir and her the night before and Mohit surprises Siddhi with an unplanned move to help her deal with her anxiety. Umang gets some wonderful advice from three wonderful women. Anjana gives in and things get steamy between her and Arjun. From the time Mihir arrives at the party, Siddhi keeps running from him. Damini is hit with some earth shattering news which makes her breakdown. Jeh helps her through her meltdown. Siddhi has an unknown man threatening to expose her online secrets if she doesn't do what he wants off her. Arjun sneaks up on Anjana having a conversation with Arya and things get tense. The girls discuss turning thirty and their plans going forward. Mihir finally catches up with Siddhi and is pleasantly surprised. Umang secretly meets up with her high profile client in Goa but things don't go her way. Damini find a way of getting back at her board.
9	9	"Reality Bites."	Anu Menon	Devika Bhagat	25 January 2019
It's Diwali. A new year and new beginnings. Siddhi and Mihir are taking their new found equation to a new level by secretly meeting up in hotel rooms. Damini and Jeh get passionate and Damini finds enough comfort to take things a notch ahead. Umang has to deal with unexpected visitors and a surprise declaration from Pinky which leaves her confused. Arjun gets serious with Anjana about his feelings for her. Anjana invites Arjun over for dinner with Arya. Jeh wakes Damini up the next morning to big news on Damini's troll story getting some serious traction. Damini gets invited for several prime time interviews. Varun meets Arjun for the first time and things get awkward. Dr Warsi is back and his timing couldn't get worse. Damini gets wind from Karan, Varun and Asha about a massive story that Akanksha is gearing up for. Mihir has a surprise for Siddhi which she just didn't see coming. Fireworks aren't the only thing that will be exploding tonight.
10	10	"Dancing on the Edge."	Anu Menon	Devika Bhagat	25 January 2019
Siddhi makes an important decision for Mihir and herself which does not please Sneha at all. Viju compensates by showing his support. The anonymous man issues an ultimatum to Siddhi which leaves her panic stricken. Umang tells her mother that she's ready to marry the boy her mother has chosen. Pinky is shocked at Umang's sudden change of mind. Damini and Akanksha have a run in within the office which ends on a bitter sweet note. Siddhi sends out an SOS to her friends asking them to meet her at Truck Bar the next day. When the four girls get together, instead of helping Siddhi out, they end up having a big argument. Siddhi decides to do things her way without anyone's help. The anonymous man finally reveals his true identity and Siddhi, although in shock, loses all control. The girls go their own way leaving Anjana alone at the bar. Damini invites Jeh to her award ceremony but things don't go the way she had planned it. Kavya calls Anjana in a moment of crisis about Arya and Anjana makes an impulsive decision which could go horribly wrong. Damini tries calling Umang from the award ceremony when she discovers that the story Akanksha has been working on has now gone live. But Umang is busy at a family dinner with a prospective groom. Umang has an outburst in front of everyone. Damini has a change of heart at the award ceremony which leaves the audience in shock. Anjana's impulsive decision lands her in big trouble. And even bigger trouble with Varun and she end up in a war of words while Kavya plays spectator. Umang is left high and dry by her high profile client but she decides to pursue it and give it one last chance. Damini lands up at Truck Bar to meet with Jeh but she's in for a nasty surprise. Siddhi reaches home to find that word has already reached her parents about her secret life. All isn't well. All might not end well.

=== Season 2 (2020) ===
Amazon Prime announced the second season of the web series in June 2019 with Nupur Asthana replacing Anu Menon as director. It is undoubtedly Amazon Prime India's first successful women-led franchise in the over-the-top (OTT) space. Four More Shots Please! season 2 was released on 17 April 2020.

No. overall	No. in season	Title	Directed by	Written by	Original release date
11	1	"Together Forever?"	Nupur Asthana	Devika Bhagat	17 April 2020
A frantic phone call to Umang by Siddhi, who is in Istanbul, no idea as to how and why she is there.The call makes Umang to reach out to Anjana and Damini in a bid to save their friend from a prospective mental breakdown. They rush to Istanbul, to find Siddhi who then relates her adventurous misgivings. The girls are relieved to find her but angry that they almost had a panic attack. Their friendship is rekindling and they seamlessly pick up from where they left each other four months ago. The girls have a fun couple of days in Istanbul, exploring quaint cafés, frolicking on the streets, and being their usual carefree selves while resolving their grudges. Upon their return to Mumbai, will the girls be able to persuade a very reluctant Damini to revisit Truck Bar after her embarrassing episode with Jeh. Let's see if they reclaim their usual favorite spot at Truck and if their favorite bartender is still around for those round of shots.
12	2	"Love Is A 4-Letter Word.F@#k Lust Hate Loss Fate"	Nupur Asthana	Devika Bhagat	17 April 2020
Anjana, Damini, Siddhi and Umang are dealing with various heartaches and roadblocks. Damini cannot seem to overcome her writer's block no matter how much she tries to distract herself with mundane jobs and trivial pursuits of procrastination. Arjun is pursuing Anjana and dreaming of a glorious future with her, which is giving her pangs of anxiety. She expresses the same to the girls. Anjana's new senior is blatantly misogynistic and she is suddenly very uncomfortable at work. Siddhi is trying to find herself by dipping her feet in various vocations. She is frustrated that her father refuses to see her as an adult and take her seriously. In a bid to vent out her angst she accidentally finds herself in a verbal duel with a stand up comedian. It is quite liberating and cathartic for her. Umang deals with the heartbreak of seeing Samara breakdown in front of the media. She feels her insides squirm with pain and overcompensates it by being chirpy and extra happy. A friendly advice by Anjana meant for both Umang and her makes think about their strained relationships. Do they find a closure or do they always remain broken?
13	3	"Spring Cleaning"	Nupur Asthana	Devika Bhagat	17 April 2020
All the girls have chosen to clean their lives of the clutter and create space for new possibilities. Umang stands strong with Samara and helps her overcome her deep-set anxieties and depression. She learns some new things about Samara in the process and makes her believe that sometimes it's okay to seek help and solace. Anjana's problems with Vinil grow manifold and now he is questioning her caliber on the basis of her gender. Will she choose to stay or will she choose her self-respect over her career? Back home, she also has to make a major decision about her future with Arjun. Will she let go of him despite being in love with him or will she want to explore their relationship further? Damini's procrastination hits a new high but a phone call from a potential publisher makes her believe in herself a little more. Siddhi is offered to try her hand at stand up and though at first she is taken aback she decides to sail this wave and see where it leads her. Viju vents out all his pent up emotions about Siddhi and Sneha tries to show him a different perspective to how society perceives men and women. What does not spark joy anymore is gratefully and gracefully left behind. They all individually decide to stand up for themselves.
14	4	"Hell Bent!"	Nupur Asthana	Devika Bhagat	17 April 2020
After a strenuous and difficult journey and numerous months of research, Damini finally manages to complete her book. She has put in all of her heart and soul into the book and now ventures out to find publishers for the same. Siddhi joins Amit on stage and performs her first stand up act. She is nervous but holds her ground. The laughs and hoots from the audience stir up an urge to try this more seriously. Jeh and Damini are now past their initial hesitation and are slowly warming up to each other though Myra still remains as a looming presence. Anjana meets a lawyer, Shashank who is her rival at work but there are definite sparks between them. Anjana should be careful around charming men what with all the other complications in life. Damini is in for a rude shock when all the publishers are giving her a cold shoulder and a colder response. Umang has taken Samara away for a weekend retreat where Samara and Umang's relationship might get cemented further. Siddhi is progressively getting better at her stand up acts. Now it's for us to see if Amit is the catalyst or the companion that she is looking for. Some new stories begin and some old ones are renewed in this episode.
15	5	"Love is in the Air"	Nupur Asthana	Devika Bhagat	17 April 2020
Varun barges in on a girl's night at Truck Bar. He is lonely, sad and desperate for company, Anjana cannot figure out his behaviour. The night rolls out with a little dancing, a bleeding nose and Varun ending up at Anjana's house. Anjana and Varun reminisce about the past but do things go beyond that? The other girls are summoned in for a post mortem of the situation. An awkward morning after breakfast with Kavya makes things worse. Siddhi travels into Amit's world which is quite alien to her but she is fascinated with it. She is determined to take things slowly this time. Amit helps her find direction in her stand up performances after a bombed solo performance. A distraught and disappointed Damini ends up going on a night stroll with Jeh who pushes her to fight harder and shows her how tough she is. He comes up with a suggestion but will she walk that path? A certain pleasant turn of events might also churn a new chapter in her love life. Will she be able to choose between Warsi and Jeh? Samara gets invited to an award show, where she is confronted with a barrage of questions. Will she finally come out of the closet or will she keep her relationship with Umang a secret?
16	6	"Crossroads"	Nupur Asthana	Devika Bhagat	17 April 2020
Umang and Samara find themselves trending on social media after the award show. '#Umara' is now a celebrated tag. But is Umang's new found popularity making Samara insecure and possessive? Umang invites Samara into her world and takes her to Truck. Will Samara hit it off with the girls or will their worlds still be distant and apart? Jeh and Damini are all kinds of romantic, mushy and quite the quintessential couple about town. It is the perfect relationship but will Damini be able to sustain this or will it sail away? Anjana whoops Shashank's ass in a case of plagiarism that they were fighting from opposite ends. This makes Shashank offer her a position at his firm. Will she accept the offer despite the slippery slope that she is on? Siddhi has found a new command over stand up and ends up delivering a successful solo show. Is she recognizing a pattern in Amit? Will this affect their relationship? Damini has an insipid book launch and is also hit by an unplanned surprise or rather shock. She takes her dilemma to the girls and vents out her fears and apprehensions. Eventually she makes a choice.
17	7	"Step into the Light"	Nupur Asthana	Devika Bhagat	17 April 2020
Anjana joins Shashank's firm and finds herself charmed by him. The chemistry is now so tangible that one can feel it in the air. Should she act on it or ignore it is the question that keeps troubling her. Umang struggles to make her way in a world that Samara is an expert in- facing the camera. Samara comes to her rescue and holds her hand through the process. Siddhi musters up the courage to invite her father for one of her shows. Through her stand up act, will Viju finally become her best friend again or will he get more furious when he learns the truth? Siddhi is also incessantly stalking one of her exes. Varun and Anjana have an awkward conversation about the happened the other night. Will Damini be able to stick to her decision and take the reins of her life in her hands or will she succumb to the flow? The girls reassure her that she is not alone. She still struggles with her guilt of wanting to be honest with Jeh. There is a major altercation at a Literature Festival where her book receives flak from the audience. Umang comes back home to a surprise. Will Samara's gesture change Umang's life forever and will Umang want to take this leap?
18	8	"Hooking Up And Breaking Up"	Nupur Asthana	Devika Bhagat	17 April 2020
Umang's celebrations and the wedding preparations begin with full fervor. Samara has taken over everything and it is turning out to be a grander extravaganza than what Umang had anticipated. Will Umang be able to voice her opinion? Anjana and Shashank have a roaring chemistry going for them. Does this chemistry lead to a personal space or will Anjana be able to stop herself from falling for Shashank? Amit calls Siddhi his girlfriend while on stage. Is Siddhi ready to be called anyone's girlfriend? Does she want commitment in her life? Will she be honest with Amit when he lands up at home for dinner? Damini tells Warsi that she's pregnant and the baby is his. Will they both find a way to be a part of the baby's life? Weddings are a lot about families. Umang reaches out to her family to tell them about her wedding. Will they let bygones be and embrace her or shut the doors on her again? To lift everyone's spirit, the girls plan a fun and funky bachelorette party at Truck Bar. There is a lot of dancing, multiple orgasms and multiple shots. The episode ends with a somber note.
19	9	"Noughts and Crosses"	Nupur Asthana	Devika Bhagat	17 April 2020
Weddings warrant drama. It is inevitable. Umang's wedding is no exception. Umang tries inviting Jeh for Damini's sake but will Jeh forgive Damini and show up? Damini has a collapsible panic attack and Warsi self invites himself for the wedding to take care of her as a doctor. A palatial wedding awaits the girls as they make their way through the majestic gates of a palace hotel in Udaipur. Little do they know that more surprises await them at the wedding? Umang is irritated and exhausted with the social media glare that their wedding has constantly. Was she still hoping that it was a quieter and more intimate affair despite knowing Samara so well? There are clashes between her and Samara. Is it just wedding nerves or are the brides not ready yet? Anjana has to confront Shashank's wife Sushmita who happens to be a guest at the wedding. Is Anjana imagining it or is there is a cold vibe brewing under Sushmita's friendly façade? Siddhi has a surprise visitor at the wedding. She feels Umang has forced this closure upon her. Will she ever be able to get over this? There is Kho Kho, a Sangeet with beautiful and uncoordinated dances and a lot of confusion along with the anticipation of a wedding. The episode ends with Anjana's worst fear coming true. How much more can things get out of control?
20	10	"The One"	Nupur Asthana	Devika Bhagat	17 April 2020
The finale episode will evoke all kinds of emotions and take one through an ebb and flow of continuous struggles that these girls who are now rightfully women of strength go through. Anjana feels betrayed by Shashank when she knows that his truth was not the entire truth. The showdown is ugly and Anjana is left feeling guilty. The girls stand by her and help see her a different perspective to the situation. Siddhi applies for a comedy course in New York and realizes that it's time for her to discover herself away from her parents. Damini has an offer to move to Singapore with Warsi. Will she make that move? Umang and Samara's relationship is getting stretched and strained by the minute. Damini's book is banned; Jeh lands up at the wedding ready to accept her and the baby. Will Jeh and Warsi both put up a fight for Damini? Who will win? Damini has a complication in her pregnancy. Right before walking down the aisle, Umang learns of a decision that Samara has made about their future. Does Umang have second thoughts while walking down the aisle or does she go through with it? The wedding is beautiful and it pulls at your heartstrings to see two brides walk down the aisle in all wedding finery. The girls realize that the only constant in their lives are each other. Endings are sometimes devastating.

== Reception ==
The debut season received positive reviews from the critics.

The second season received positive reviews from critics. Shweta Keshri from India Today wrote, "Cinematically the series is a joy to watch - be it the locations, the gorgeous outfits or the glamourous [sic] stars. Since the first season hooked you, you shouldn't miss the second one."

However, season 3 received mixed reviews. Rachana Dubey of The Times of India wrote, "The cinematography, smart use of locations, and Mikey McCleary's music add a great touch to the material that has been sensitively handled by Joyeeta. All in all, this season of the show could have hit higher notes and been notches better in terms of the overall storytelling. What we do have here is a round of shots that could have been more spirited." Saibal Chatterjee from NDTV praised the music score supervised by Mikey McCleary and wrote,"The songs are an extension of the scenes: they supplement the spoken lines in ways that enhance their impact and illuminate the many moods of the narrative". Dishya Sharma from News18 wrote, "Four More Shots Please! does a fan service for those following the series diligently since season 1 with its repeated formulas such as a monologue from Siddhi and Damini self-sabotaging her relationship but after three seasons, you'd want them to not own up to their mess but get a little better at cleaning it up as well."

== Awards and nominations ==
Award	Date of the ceremony	Category	Nominee(s)	Result	Ref.
iReel Awards	23 September 2019	Best Music	Four More Shots Please	Nominated	
International Emmy Awards	23 November 2020	Best Comedy Series	Four More Shots Please	Nominated	
Filmfare OTT Awards	19 December 2020	Best Actress - Comedy Series	Maanvi Gagroo	Nominated	
Filmfare OTT Awards	19 December 2020	Best Actress - Drama Series	Kirti Kulhari	Nominated	
