= Sorry Bhai! =

- Theatrical release poster
- Directed by: Onir
- Written by: Ashwini Malik
- Produced by: Vashu Bhagnani
- Starring: Sharman Joshi; Chitrangada Singh; Sanjay Suri; Shabana Azmi; Boman Irani
- Cinematography: Sachin K. Krishn
- Edited by: Irene Dhar Malik
- Music by: Gaurav Dayal
- Production companies: Pooja Entertainment; Mumbai Mantra
- Distributed by: Anticlock Films
- Release date: 28 November 2008
- Country: India
- Language: Hindi

Sorry Bhai is a 2008 Indian Hindi-language romantic drama film directed by Onir, starring Sanjay Suri, Sharman Joshi,Chitrangada Singh, Shabana Azmi and Boman Irani. The film was released on 28 November 2008.

== Plot ==
Siddharth Mathur (Sharman Joshi), a shy young scientist, travels to Mauritius for his elder brother Harsh's (Sanjay Suri) wedding. Accompanying him is his mother Gayatri (Shabana Azmi), a reluctant traveller since she is angry at Harsh for deciding to get married without consulting them. Also travelling is Siddharth's cheery father Navin (Boman Irani), whose sole entertainment is pulling Gayatri's leg. Harsh, pre-occupied with work, can spend little time with his family and it is left to his fiancée Aaliyah (Chitrangada Singh) to show them around Mauritius before the wedding. However, Ma's anger at Harsh ensures that she takes an instant dislike for Aaliyah, and it is Aaliyah and Siddharth who end up spending loads of time together. This, added to the fact that Aaliyah feels neglected by the career-obsessed Harsh, leads to them being irresistibly drawn to each other. A horrified Siddharth battles this attraction desperately, but Aaliyah has fallen madly in love and pursues him with single-minded determination. When Siddharth's defences start crumbling and Ma starts getting suspicious, all hell breaks loose in the Mathur family.

== Cast ==
- Sharman Joshi as Siddharth Mathur
- Chitrangada Singh as Aaliyah
- Sanjay Suri as Harshvardhan Mathur
- Shabana Azmi as Gayatri Devi Mathur
- Boman Irani as Navin Mathur
- Gaurav Nanda as Student

== Soundtrack ==
Track listing
No.	Title	Lyrics	Music	Singer(s)	Length
1.	"Mere Khuda Karam"	Amitabh Verma	Gaurav Dayal, Vivek Philip	K.K.	6:03
2.	"Pal Yeh Pal"	Amitabh Verma	Gaurav Dayal, Vivek Philip	Sunidhi Chauhan	5:07
3.	"Sorry Bhai!"	Amitabh Verma, Vivek Philip	Gaurav Dayal, Vivek Philip	Sunidhi Chauhan, K. K., Abhishek Nailwal	4:29
4.	"Jalte Hain"	Amitabh Verma	Gaurav Dayal, Vivek Philip	K. K., Abhishek Nailwal	4:22
5.	"Some Times"	Amitabh Verma	Gaurav Dayal, Vivek Philip	Nanette Natal	4:50
6.	"Jalte Hain (Version 2)"	Amitabh Verma	Gaurav Dayal, Vivek Philip	Abhishek Nailwal	4:27
7.	"Mere Khuda (Remix)"	Amitabh Verma	Gaurav Dayal, Vivek Philip	K.K.	4:08
8.	"Pal Yeh Pal (Remix)"	Amitabh Verma	Gaurav Dayal, Vivek Philip	Sunidhi Chauhan, Abhishek Nailwal	4:42
9.	"Jalte Hain (Remix)"	Amitabh Verma	Gaurav Dayal, Vivek Philip	Abhishek Nailwal	3:37
Total length:					36:55
