= Hubahu =

- Genre: Drama
- Written by: Ajitabh Menon
- Directed by: Nupur Asthana
- Starring: See below
- Country of origin: India
- Original language: Hindi
- No. of seasons: 1
- No. of episodes: 30

Production
- Producers: Milind Soman; Deepa Sahi; Parvati Balagopalan; Tony Singh; Deeya Singh
- Production locations: Mumbai; Bangkok
- Camera setup: single-camera
- Running time: Approx. 24 minutes
- Production company: DJ's a Creative Unit

Original release
- Network: Sony Entertainment Television
- Release: 7 February – 29 August 2002

Hubahu (transl. Same to same) is an Indian television series. The story revolves around a pair of twin sisters who exchange places for a lark but end up getting intricately involved in each other's lives. The story is an adaptation of the 1985 American miniseries Deceptions, starring Stefanie Powers and Barry Bostwick, in which Powers starred as twins who swap places leading to dire consequences.

The series premiered on Sony Entertainment Television on 7 February 2002. The series starred Sandhya Mridul in the lead who played the characters of both sisters, Aditi and Ananya. Produced by Parvati Balagopalan and Milind Soman (Season 1) and Tony Singh and Deeya Singh (since Season 2) it was shot in Mumbai and Bangkok.

== Concept ==
The story portrays the lives of twin sisters Aditi and Ananya who have very different personalities. Aditi is a bored and neglected housewife in Pune whose lecturer husband has no time for her. Ananya is a sophisticated art dealer in Bangkok. Bored and fed up with their own lives they decide to switch identities as a game for a week but then things go haywire.

== Cast ==
- Sandhya Mridul ... Aditi and Ananya
- Rajat Kapoor
- Suchitra Pillai
- Tarun Raghwan
- Alyy Khan
