= Pushtiie =

Indian actress

Pushtiie is an Indian actress best known for playing the lead role of Mahi Talwar in the comedy series Mahi Way on Sony TV.

== Personal life ==
She is the sister of actor Vrajesh Hirjee, famous for playing comedic roles in Bollywood films and shows.

== Career ==
Pushtiie appeared in the second season of Hum Paanch, a famous comedy soap that ran on Zee TV in the late 1990s. She played the youngest daughter of Anand Mathur (Ashok Saraf), "Chotti" among the five daughters. This serial was produced by Ekta Kapoor. Pushtiie had a role in Jassi Jaisi Koi Nahin, which was inspired by the Colombian telenovela Yo soy Betty, la fea. She played the character of Sanya's best friend in the soap Sanya that was aired on Hungama TV.

== Filmography ==
=== Films ===
- Ishq Vishk (2003)
- Sau Jhooth Ek Sach (2005)
- Koi Aap Sa (2005)
- Barsaat (2005)
- Aloo Chaat (2009)
- Aao Wish Karein (2009)
- Luv Ka The End (2011)
- Desi Boyz (2011)
- Hamari Adhuri Kahani (2015)
- Qarib Qarib Single (2017)

=== Web series ===
- Aafat (2019) as Aditi Mahant
- Modern Love Mumbai (2022) as Alicia Martins
- Mahi Way (2010) as Mahi

=== Short films ===
- Let Stalk (2015)
- The Corner Table
- It All Starts From Within (2019)

=== Television ===
- Kahaani Ghar Ghar Kii
- Kkusum
- Kohi Apna Sa
- Sanya
- Miilee
- Kahiin To Hoga
- Aati Rahengi Baharein
- Meri Biwi Wonderful
- Kareena Kareena (2004) as Pammi
- Hum Paanch season 2(2005) as Chotti Mathur
- Jassi Jaissi Koi Nahin as Maithili (Jassi's friend)
- Pyaar Ko Ho Jaane Do as Niti Kiku Khurrana / Niti Hooda
