= Shan Mohammed =

Indian film editor

- Occupation: Film editor
- Years active: 2007–present

Shan Mohammed is an Indian film editor who works in Hindi and Tamil language films.

== Career ==
A commerce graduate, Shan Mohammed, had gone to Chennai for his articleship and became acquainted with cinematographer P. C. Sreeram at a photo exhibition, who recommended that he go to Mumbai, if he wanted a pursue a career in films. Soon Shan was working with Pankaj Advani on a series of 10-minute films titled Bheja Fry for Channel V, and then in 2000, he got into Pune's Film and Television Institute of India in the editing course. During his course, Shan actively sought out opportunities to become involved in Hindi cinema, and went on to edit the experimental films, The Great Indian Butterfly (2007) and Frozen (2007) during his third year. His work in both ventures were well appreciated and he subsequently moved on to bigger projects, and won further acclaim for his work in Aamir Khan's production Jaane Tu... Ya Jaane Na (2008). He subsequently became acquainted with Kamal Haasan and was signed to work on the big-budget, bilingual period film, Marmayogi, before it was shelved. He also edited the Aamir Bashir directed award-winning Kashmiri language film Harud (Winter).

He continued to win acclaim for his work in Wake Up Sid (2009) and Lekar Hum Deewana Dil (2014), while he returned to collaborate with Kamal Haasan on Tamil and Telugu films like Manmadhan Ambu and Thoonga Vaanam. In 2014, he exited midway through the production of Revolver Rani (2014) claiming that the producers failed to pay him for his work. Shan has collaborated with cinematographer and director Shankar Raman on multiple films including Gurgaon. Leila and Love Hostel. He has also edited Akshat Verma's popular cult classic Kaalakandi and comedian Biswa Kalyan Rath's popular show Laakhon Mein Ek. His recent big releases include Aamir Bashir's Maagh, Abhinay Deo's Savi and Anand Tiwari's Dharma comedy Bad Newz.

On the personal front, Shan is married to author and former journalist Janhavi Samant, who has written bestsellers like Faaltugiri And Other Flashbacks, When Elephants Had Wings and Shivaji And His Swarajya Adventures. and has two kids Saad Janhavi Shan and Saraa Janhavi Shan.

== Filmography ==
Key
†	Denotes films that have not yet been released

Year	Title	Language	Notes
2007	The Great Indian Butterfly	English	
2007	Frozen	Hindi; Ladakhi	
2008	Jaane Tu... Ya Jaane Na	Hindi	
2009	Ek Tho Chance	Hindi	
2009	Wake Up Sid	Hindi	
2010	Harud	Kashmiri	
2010	Jhootha Hi Sahi	Hindi	
2010	Manmadan Ambu	Tamil	
2011	My Friend Pinto	Hindi	
2013	Zinda Bhaag	Punjabi; Urdu	
2014	One by Two	Hindi	
2014	Lekar Hum Deewana Dil	Hindi	
2014	Fireflies	Hindi	
2015	Hawaizaada	Hindi	
2015	Thoongaa Vanam; Cheekati Rajyam	Tamil; Telugu	
2017	Gurgaon	Hindi	
2017	Lakhon Mein Ek	Hindi	TV series
2018	Rammat Gammat	Hindi	
2018	Kaalakaandi	Hindi	
2021	Grahan	Hindi	TV series
2021	Aafat-E-Ishq	Hindi	
2022	Love Hostel	Hindi	
2022	Pada	Malayalam	
2022	Modern Love Mumbai	Hindi	
2022	Maagh	Hindi	TV series
2024	Savi	Hindi	
2024	Bad Newz	Hindi	
