= Nupur Asthana =

Indian film director and writer

- Born: Uttar Pradesh, India
- Occupations: Director, writer
- Years active: 1998–present
- Known for: Mujhse Fraaandship Karoge Hip Hip Hurray

Nupur Asthana is an Indian film director and writer known for her work in Hindi cinema and television. She made her debut on Indian television with the 1998 TV series Hip Hip Hurray. Her film debut was the 2011 youth film Mujhse Fraaandship Karoge produced by the Y-Films banner - the youth arm of Yashraj Films.

== Early life ==
Asthana grew up in Kolkata and Hyderabad. She studied English literature at Lady Shri Ram College for Women (LSR), Delhi University. She was actively involved in amateur theatre and headed the dramatics society in her college. She did her post graduation in Social Communications Media from Sophia Polytechnic, Mumbai.

== Career ==
- She started her career as an intern with film maker Ketan Mehta. Later she was the Chief Assistant Director on the film Aar Ya Paar where she was also the voice of Kamal Sidhu.
- She debuted as a writer and director on Indian Television with the prime time TV series Hip Hip Hurray on Zee Tv. The story is based on the lives of 12th grade students, their adventures, their fears and hopes, and their relationships and interactions. The show is considered to be a cult hit to this date.
- She then moved on to direct the prime time drama miniseries Hubahu on Sony TV. The story revolves around a pair of twin sisters who exchange places for a lark but end up getting intricately involved in each other's lives. Hubahu starred Sandhya Mridul in the lead who played the double role of twins Aditi and Ananya who exchange lives. It also starred Rajat Kapoor, Mohan Kapoor and Suchitra Pillai.
- After the success of the shows Hip Hip Hurray and Hubahu she co-directed the action adventure miniseries Time Bomb 9/11 with Ketan Mehta.
- She then directed the TV miniseries Mahi Way on Sony TV produced by YRF Television. The story traces the journey of a large girl Mahi Talwar, essayed by Pushtiie Shaktie, who is a target of body shaming and who also struggles with her own insecurities and rejections.The show is an amazing journey of self-discovery as Mahi finally embraces her true self amidst all odds and crumbling relationships.
- Nupur debuted as a director with the film Mujhse Fraaandship Karoge which was produced by Y - Films, the youth banner under Yashraj Films. Mujhse Fraaandship Karoge is a young teen film that explores today's obsession with the online world that constantly clashes with the real world and the tussle between them. It unanimously got excellent reviews. Midday called it "A fantastic debut by Nupur Asthana, who has managed to keep the movie light and breezy just like the relationships and friendships in campuses generally are."
- She directed the romantic comedy Bewakoofiyaan which was produced by Yashraj Films. The film stars Sonam Kapoor, Ayushmann Khurranna and Rishi Kapoor.
- She directed another miniseries Romil and Jugal on Alt Balaji. The show is a modern, homosexual, spin on the classic tale of Shakespeare's Romeo-Juliet where Punjabi playboy Romil and shy Tam-Brahm Jugal come to terms with their sexuality and face the orthodox society. The show was greatly appreciated for breaking the stereotypes and received rave reviews by both the audience and the critics.
- She then directed Season 2 of Four More Shots Please on Amazon Prime Video.

== Achievements ==
- Nupur Asthana was nominated for the best debut director at The Screen Awards for her film Mujhse Fraandship Karoge.

== Filmography ==
Year	Title	Creator	Director	Producer	Writer	Notes	Ref.
1998	Hip Hip Hurray	Yes	Yes	No	Yes	Debut	
2002	Hubahu	Yes	Yes	No	No		
2003	Kyun Hota Hai Pyaar	No	Yes	No	No		
2010	Mahi Way	Yes	Yes	No	No		
2011	Mujhse Fraaandship Karoge		Yes	No	No	Film debut	
2014	Bewakoofiyaan		Yes	No	No		
2017	Romil & Jugal	Yes	Yes	No	No		
2020	Four More Shots Please	No	Yes	No	No	Season 2	
2022	Modern Love Mumbai	No	Yes	No	No	Episode: "Cutting Chai"	
2022	Unpaused: Naya Safar	No	Yes	No	Yes	Segment: "The Couple"	
2025	The Royals	No	Yes	No	No	Co-directed with Priyanka Ghose	
