= Manmadan Ambu =

- Theatrical release poster
- Directed by: K. S. Ravikumar
- Written by: Kamal Haasan; Crazy Mohan (unc.)
- Produced by: Udhayanidhi Stalin
- Starring: Kamal Haasan; Trisha; R. Madhavan; Sangeetha
- Cinematography: Manush Nandan
- Edited by: Shan Mohammed
- Music by: Devi Sri Prasad
- Production company: Red Giant Movies
- Distributed by: Gemini Film Circuit (worldwide); Sree Gokulam Films (Kerala)
- Release date: 23 December 2010
- Running time: 152 minutes
- Country: India
- Language: Tamil
- Budget: ₹ 50 crore

Manmadan Ambu (transl. Cupid's Arrow) is a 2010 Indian Tamil-language romantic comedy film directed by K. S. Ravikumar and written by Kamal Haasan. The film stars Haasan, Trisha and R. Madhavan in the title roles and Sangeetha. Ramesh Aravind, Urvashi, Usha Uthup, Oviya, Mohan Das, Manju Pillai, and Caroline play supporting roles. The film features music composed by Devi Sri Prasad, with several songs written and sung by Kamal Haasan himself, while Manush Nandan and Shan Mohammed made their debuts as cinematographer and editor.

After significant pre-production which included rehearsals of the entire script before filming, the film was extensively shot in Europe and on a cruise ship, whilst scenes were also canned across Chennai and Kodaikanal. It was produced by Udhayanidhi Stalin, Manmadan Ambu released worldwide on 23 December 2010. The movie was based on the 1948 movie Romance on the High Seas.

== Plot ==
Ambujakshi alias "Nisha", a film actress, arrives in Europe to spend the vacations with her friend Deepa, a divorcee, and her two children Viswanath alias Vish and Bhagirathi alias Bags. While going in a taxi, Ambu recalls an early incident regarding her ex-boyfriend Madhanagopal, a wealthy entrepreneur. Three years ago, she was shooting for a film with actor Suriya in a bright park, and Madhan was suspicious of her relationship with the actor. While returning, he let Ambu drive his new car. Madhan insisted that Ambu stop acting but she refused, leading to an argument that almost caused their car to crash into a smaller white car. Unable to bear Madhan's jealousy, Ambu broke her relationship with Madhan and walked away.

Madhan now suspects that Ambu may be having a relationship with her colleagues in the film industry. To end that, he hires detective Major Raja Mannar to follow her when she goes on a cruise for a vacation in Barcelona. Mannar accepts, as he needs money to pay the hospital bills of his friend Rajan, who is diagnosed with cancer, and who is being taken care of by his wife Mallika. Contrary to Madhan's suspicions, Ambu is loyal and virtuous; when Mannar reports this, Madhan refuses to pay him as his suspicions were unfounded.

Disappointed, Mannar, to save his dying friend Rajan, fabricates a story and tells Madhan that she is having a secret affair during her trip. In the process, he introduces himself as a manager of a security company to Ambu, Deepa, and Deepa's children, and becomes close to the group. While getting closer to Ambu, Mannar says to Madhan that Ambu's intentions are good, but the man she was being seen with, is of poor character. Madhan does not like what he hears and eventually breaks up with Ambu. In the background, Madhan's mother Indira, who has never liked Ambu, calls her brother to inform that Madhan has broken up with Ambu and that they should get his daughter Sunanda married to Madhan as agreed previously.

While recollecting his past as an army officer to Ambu, Mannar reveals that he lost his wife Juliet three years ago in a car accident. Ambu realizes to her horror that the accident was caused by her during the argument with Madhan. Both of them decide to confront each other with the truth, but Ambu misidentifies Kunju Kurup as Madhan's detective, slaps him, and tells him that she loves Mannar. Meanwhile, Rajan undergoes an operation immediately after the chemotherapy, in an attempt to keep him alive. To make things worse, Madhan announces that he will visit them in person at Venice. Ultimately, Mannar and Deepa (who now knows that Mannar is Madhan's actual spy) stage a plan with the help of Kurup and his wife Manju to deceive Madhan for the final break-up with Ambu.

Madhan arrives at the place and various mix-ups and misunderstandings take place among the characters. Finally, Madhan realises that Ambu has fallen in love with Mannar and accepts it with a heavy heart. At the same time, Rajan recovers from cancer. Mallika calls and tells Mannar this with tears and thanks him. The film ends as everyone returns to India on the cruise, with Madhan and Deepa starting a relationship and Mannar and Ambu proposing their love.

== Cast ==
- Kamal Haasan as Major Raja Mannar (Major R Mannar)
- Trisha as Ambujakshi (Ambu) / Nisha
- R. Madhavan as Madhanagopal (Madhan)
- Sangeetha as Deepa
- Ramesh Aravind as Rajan
- Urvashi as Mallika
- Usha Uthup as Indira
- Oviya as Sunanda
- Mohan Das as Kunju Kurup
- Manju Pillai as Manju Kurup
- Caroline as Juliet
- Aasish Mahesh as Viswanath Srinivasan (Vish)
- Pooja as Bagirathi (Bags)
- Biriyaalayam Thurai as Thurai
- Ramji as Jeyagopal
- Sriman as Palani
- Akash as Karthik
- Madhumitha as Vasantha

Cameo appearances

- Suriya (in the song "Oyyale")
- K. S. Ravikumar (in the song "Oyyale")
- Shobi (in the song "Oyyale")
- Devi Sri Prasad (in the song "Neela Vaanam")
- Diya (voice only) (in the song "Oyyale")

== Production ==
The launch ceremony of Manmadan Ambu was held on 3 June 2010. During the launch, Kamal Haasan said that prior to the shoot rehearsals were performed. Haasan, along with Crazy Mohan, wrote the film. The film also marked the debut of cinematographer Manush Nandan in Tamil cinema.

Haasan worked again with director K. S. Ravikumar for the fifth time after Avvai Shanmugi (1996), Thenali (2000), Panchatanthiram (2002) and Dasavathaaram (2008). Ramji, who worked as a location scouter for Manmadan Ambu, also played Madhavan's father. Film shoots were subsequently held aboard a cruise liner from Dubai, and the film was shot across various regions of Europe including Paris and Marseille in France, Barcelona in Spain, and Rome and Venice in Italy. Parts of the film were also shot in Kodaikanal in South India including scenes with French actress Caroline, who was selected amongst 15 women; remaining portions were completed in Chennai. 90 per cent of the film was shot abroad, and 40 per cent was on the ship MSC Splendida. French crew also worked in the film. The song "Neela Vanam" was shot in reverse chronology.

== Music ==
Manmadan Ambu

Soundtrack album by Devi Sri Prasad
- Released: 20 November 2010
- Recorded: Panchathan Record Inn and AM Studios
- Length: 28:50
- Language: Tamil
- Label: Venus Records & Tapes
- Producer: Devi Sri Prasad

Devi Sri Prasad chronology
Singam (2010)	Manmadan Ambu (2010)	Mr. Perfect (2011)

The film's music was scored by Devi Sri Prasad and all the lyrics were written by Kamal Haasan himself. The soundtrack album was launched at a promotional event held on 20 November 2010, at Singapore Expo, Singapore, where the film's cast and crew and other celebrities attended the event. The song "Kamal Kavidhai" elicited controversy due to lines about a woman's desire and for references to Hindu deities like Aranganathar and Sri Varalakshmi. Therefore, Udhayanidhi Stalin opted to remove it from the film.

Pavithra Srinivasan of Rediff gave the album 3/5 saying that "DSP has a reputation for sticking with his regulation format of tunes and here too, you can see it pop up at certain places but there's also a departure from the usual, mostly an influence of Haasan in both lyrics and music. Whatever the reason, the end result is an album that provides you a treat. Go for it."

Track listing
No.	Title	Lyrics	Singer(s)	Length
1.	"Dhagudu Dhattham"	Kamal Haasan	Kamal Haasan	4:45
2.	"Who's The Hero"	Kamal Haasan	Andrea Jeremiah	4:24
3.	"Neela Vaanam"	Kamal Haasan	Kamal Haasan, Priya Himesh	4:25
4.	"Oyyale"	Viveka	Mukesh Mohamed, Suchitra, Karthik Kumar	3:54
5.	"Kamal Kavidhai"	Kamal Haasan	Kamal Haasan, Trisha	5:15
6.	"Manmadan Ambu"	Kamal Haasan	Devi Sri Prasad	4:21
7.	"Theme Music"		Instrumental	1:46
Total length:				28:50

Telugu Track list
No.	Title	Lyrics	Singer(s)	Length
1.	"Dhagulu Dhanda"	Sahithi	Kamal Haasan
2.	"Who's The Hero"	Ramajogayya Sastry	Andrea Jeremiah
3.	"Neelakasam"	Ramajogayya Sastry	Kamal Haasan, Priya Himesh
4.	"Uyyala"	Sahithi	Mukesh, Suchitra, Karthik Kumar
5.	"Kannu Kannu Kalisela"	Vennelakanti	S. P. Balasubrahmanyam, Chinmayi
6.	"Manmadha Baanam"	Ramajogayya Sastry	Devi Sri Prasad
7.	"Theme Music"		Instrumental

== Release ==
=== Theatrical ===
The premiere of Manmadan Ambu in late November 2010 was canceled due to technical problems. The film was released on 23 December 2010, during the Christmas weekend.

=== Home media ===
Kalaignar TV bought the satellite rights.

== Reception ==
=== Box office ===
Manmadhan Ambu was released on 19 screens in Chennai and around 600 to 650 screens worldwide. The film grossed ₹46.2 million (US$480,000) in Chennai alone over a period of 4 weeks. In UK, it grossed first week $77,360 and in Malaysia $653,942. Sify declared the film as "average".

=== Critical response ===
The Indian Express gave 3 out of 5, claiming that "Manmadhan Ambu has all the elements of a good entertainer, but still something seems to be lacking. However, overall, the film is entertaining and enjoyable". Mid-Day wrote "Manmadhan Ambu does impress but it lacks the punch to captivate the audiences". Rediff.com gave 3 out of 5, claiming that "Manmadhan Ambu defies characterization as either a romantic film or a comedy, largely because the two don't mix". Sify gave 3 out of 5, said, "Manmadhan Ambu is consistently engaging. Cleverly written and sharply cast, it is a film that delivers hearty laughs. It is one of those rare Tamil films that's funny and smart at the same time". Malathi Rangarajan of The Hindu stated that, "Sprinkled with humour, joy, love, sadness and sentiment with an undercurrent of jealousy running through it, MMA [Manmadhan Ambu] is a cocktail of emotions – tasty, but at times queer!". T.S. Sudhir of NDTV wrote, "Don't go expecting a Panchatantiram from the Kamal-K. S. Ravikumar combo, for you will be disappointed. MMA has starting trouble and one hour into the film, you are desperately waiting for the comic fireworks to start, given that the film has been marketed as a laugh riot. The riot, when it happens post the interval, leaves you with a feeling of being shortchanged." He further mentioned, "The problem with MMA is as much with Kamal as with the audience for you expect nothing short of brilliance from this Master of all trades. In MMA, Kamal has shot the Cupid's arrow (which is what Manmadhan Ambu means) rather lazily. Go without expecting a world record in archery!" The New Indian Express wrote "the first half moves at a brisk pace, with some genuine fun moments, and crackling one-liners, all with the promise of more good times to come. But the second half fizzles out totally as the script nosedives never to recover".

The Telugu dubbed version of the film, Manmadha Banam which was distributed by Gemini Film Circuit, also opened to mixed reviews from critics. Jeevi from Idlebrain gave the film 3 out of 5 rating and stated "The comedy in this film is predictable at times and fresh in certain scenes. The plus points of the movie are main leads and comedy quotient. On the flipside, the characters and narration becomes confusing towards end and the editing should have been smoother. On a whole, Manmadha Banam is a decent comedy." Y. Sunita Chowdary from The Hindu said "Manmadha Banam does have a plot but the character development, narration and the pace makes it a very restless and a tedious watch." and was critical about the dubbing. She finally concluded by stating that "The film could have drawn a little wider audience than the filmmakers intended, if the length would have been a half an hour shorter."
