= Mahi Way =

- Genre: Romantic Comedy
- Written by: Devika Bhagat
- Directed by: Nupur Asthana
- Starring: See below
- Theme music composer: Rooshin Dalal
- Country of origin: India
- Original language: Hindi
- No. of seasons: 1
- No. of episodes: 26

Production
- Executive producer: Panchali Sarkar
- Running time: 52 minutes
- Production company: YRF Television

Original release
- Network: Sony Entertainment Television
- Release: 2 January – 18 June 2010

Mahi Way is an Indian comedy drama television series, which premiered on Sony Entertainment Television on 2 January 2010 and ran till 18 June 2010. The series is written by Devika Bhagat, directed by Nupur Asthana, and produced by Aditya Chopra.

== Synopsis ==
The short series tells the story of an overweight chubby girl, Mahi, who is looking for perfect love but insists on being herself rather than changing herself to conform to socially defined narrow standards of beauty.

== Plot ==
Mahi Talwar is a 25-year-old single woman who writes an advice column in a Delhi-based fashion magazine where she is always looked down upon but she aspires to be a serious journalist and more confident with her colleagues. She comes from a loud Punjabi family, pampered by her father but sidelined by her mother and beautiful elder sister Anjali. She has a crush on a handsome businessman named Ishan Singh Ahluwalia and tries every way to get closer to him with the help of her friends, Sid and Roshni.

== Cast ==
- Pushtiie Shakti as Mahi Talwar
- Viraf Patel as Shiv Deshraj
- Siddhant Karnick as Ishaan Singh Ahluwalia
- Amrita Raichand as Anjali Suri, Mahi's elder sister
- Sharon Prabhakar as Ramona Kohli, chief editor of the magazine
- Mark Farokh Parekh as Siddharth Kanwar, Mahi's friend
- Monica Khanna as Roshni Sen, Mahi's best friend
- Faezeh Jalali as Sona, Mahi's colleague at the magazine
- Reema Ramchandani as Mona, Mahi's colleague at the magazine
- Suparna Marwah as Ranjita Talwar
- Ikhlaque Khan as Alok Talwar
- Alka Pradhan as Mahi's Grandmother
- Kanika Dang as Leela
- Aditya Pandey as Ankur Talwar, Mahi's younger brother
- Olivier Lafont as Dev Gupta
- Sharad Jagtiani as Raghu Suri
