= Anshul Pandey =

Indian television actor

- Born: Mumbai, Maharashtra, India
- Occupations: Actor, model
- Years active: 2012–2021
- Known for: Yeh Rishta Kya Kehlata Hai; Hello Mini

Anshul Pandey is an Indian actor and model. He has appeared in Bade Achhe Lagte Hain (from 2012 to 2014), Yeh Rishta Kya Kehlata Hai (from 2014 to 2016), Ek Bhram...Sarvagun Sampanna (2019), and Hello Mini (2019 to present).

== Career ==
Pandey began his life career as a marine engineer. Later he became a model. He then decided to act in television shows, and his first role as Rahul Shergill was in Sony Entertainment Television's popular series Bade Achhe Lagte Hain from 2012–14. But it was Star Plus's longest-running daily TV show Yeh Rishta Kya Kehlata Hai, where his character Naman Agarwal gained him massive popularity from 2014–2016. He took a break since he quit Yeh Rishta Kya Kehlata Hai, but made a comeback in 2019, collaborating with Star Plus again to play Jay Mittal in Ek Bhram...Sarvagun Sampanna. He is most recently seen in the famous web show named 'Hello Mini' on mxplayer- he portrays the primary part of Ekansh in the series. The series has three seasons.

He is also a renowned advertisement face and has done several famous commercials for various brands.

=== Television ===
Year	Show	Role
2012–14	Bade Achhe Lagte Hain	Rahul Vikram Shergill
2012–13	Parvarrish – Kuchh Khattee Kuchh Meethi	Siddarth Rastogi
2014–16	Yeh Rishta Kya Kehlata Hai	Naman Suresh Agarwal
2019	Ek Bhram...Sarvagun Sampanna	Jay Mittal

=== Web series ===
- 2019–present - Hello Mini as Ekansh Tripathi
