= Caroline Furioli =

French actress

- Occupation: Actress
- Years active: 2001–present
- Notable work: Sous le soleil (2005–2006); Groupama advertisements (2008–2010)

Caroline Furioli is a French actress who debuted in the television series Sous le soleil and was best known for appearing in Groupama advertisements.

== Early life and career ==
Caroline Furioli went to drama class when she was seven years old. She portrayed Tonya Kinzinger's cousin Nikki in the television series Sous le soleil. She continued to go to drama classes at Cours Florent. She went on to gain recognition for appearing in Groupama advertisements from 2008 to 2010 as Cerise, an insurance advisor clad in a white dress with green polka dots. She also practiced English for the Indian film Manmadan Ambu (2010) in which she co-starred with Kamal Haasan. She played seductive Axelle in the series L'été où tout a basculé in 2010 on NRJ 12. She played Albane Latour, a hospital intern who aspires to become a doctor, in Plus belle la vie (2011).

She played Suzanne opposite Thierry (played by Nicolas Gérout) in the seventh season of Un si grand soleil in 2025.

== Selected filmography ==
=== Television ===
Year	Title	Role	Channel	Notes
2005–2006	Sous le soleil	Nikki	TF1	
2009	Adresse inconnue	Sabine Grisset		
2010	L'été où tout a basculé	Axelle	NRJ 12	
2011	Détective avenue	Gaëlle		
2011	L'été où tout a basculé	Julie Phillip	NRJ 12	Episode: "Artiste : Je me suis fait voler ma musique!"
2011; 2013	Plus belle la vie	Albane Latour	France 3	
2014	Le Sang de la vigne	Odile Six	France 3	Episode: "Vengeances tardives en Alsace"
2018	Balthazar	Unknown	La Une / TF1	Episode: "À corps perdu"
2025	Un si grand soleil	Suzanne	France 3	season 7

=== Films ===
Year	Title	Role	Notes
2001	Souffrir D'amour	Caroline	short film
2003	Eiffel I'm in Love	Girl 1 Eiffel Tower	Indonesian film
2008	Fracassé	Unknown	
2010	Une histoire triste	Bookseller	short film
2010	Manmadan Ambu	Juliet	Indian film; credited as Caroline
