= Jaane Anjaane Hum Mile =

2024 Indian Hindi television series

- Genre: Family drama
- Created by: Sonnal A. Kakar
- Developed by: Sonnal A. Kakar
- Written by: Divya Nayyar
- Screenplay by: Surabhi Saral
- Story by: Sonal Kakar
- Directed by: Uttam Ahlawat; Devender Kumar Pandey
- Starring: Ayushi Khurana; Bharat Ahlawat; Jayati Bhatia
- Opening theme: "Jaane Anjaane Hum Mile" by Ranita Banerjee and Abdul Shaikh; Lyrics: Amit Maru
- Composer: Udbhav Ojha
- Country of origin: India
- Original language: Hindi
- No. of episodes: 612

Production
- Producers: Goldie Behl; Sonnal A. Kakar
- Cinematography: Prasad Kolekar
- Camera setup: Multi-camera
- Running time: 22 minutes
- Production company: Rose Audio Visuals Pvt. Ltd

Original release
- Network: Zee TV
- Release: 11 November 2024 – 16 August 2026

Jaane Anjaane Hum Mile (transl. We Met Knowingly or Unknowingly) is an Indian Hindi-language romantic family drama television series that premiered on 11 November 2024 to 16 August 2026 on Zee TV and streams digitally on ZEE5. Produced by Sonnal A. Kakar and Goldie Behl under Rose Audio Visuals Pvt. Ltd, the series starres Ayushi Khurana, Bharat Ahlawat and Jayati Bhatia.

== Plot ==
Reet, a fiercely independent reporter, and Raghav, a temperamental man, wed under the traditional 'Aata Sata' custom as they are bound by love for their siblings.

== Cast ==
=== Main ===
- Ayushi Khurana as Reet Suryavanshi (née Chaudhary) — A reporter; Anuradha's daughter; Dhruv's sister; Raghav's wife (2024–2026)
- Bharat Ahlawat as Raghav Suryavanshi — A businessman; Unnati's brother; Reet's husband (2024–2026)
- Jayati Bhatia as Sharda Suryavanshi — Raghav and Unnati's aunt; Viren and Pratik's mother; Poonam and Divya's mother-in-law (2024–2026)

=== Recurring ===
- Sehaj Rajput as Unnati Chaudhary (née Suryavanshi) — A fashionsta; Neeta Chawla's daughter; Raghav's sister; Dhruv's wife (2024–2026)
- Rohit Dhiman as Dhruv Chaudhary — Anuradha's son; Reet's brother; Unnati's husband (2024–2026)
- Samaksh Sudi as Virendra Suryavanshi — Sharda and Manish's elder son (2024–2026)
- Kalpana Sisodia as Poonam Suryavanshi — Virendra's wife (2024–2026)
- Tiyanshika Sengar as Pihu Suryavanshi — Virendra and Poonam’s daughter (2026)
- Rohan Rai as Pratik Suryavanshi — Sharda and Manish's son (2024–2026)
- Divya Choudhary as Divya Suryavanshi — Beauty Pageant Winner, Sharda's youngest daughter in law (2024–2026)
- Neeva Malik as Smita Chaudhary — Suman's daughter (2024–2026)
- Shalini Chandran as Neeta Chawla (née Suryavanshi) — Raghav and Unnati's ex-mother; Rohit's adoptive mother (2024–2025) (Dead)
- Leena Balodi as Anuradha Chaudhary — Reet and Dhruv's mother (2024–2025) (Dead)
- Shivaani Trivedi as Suman Chaudhary — Smita's mother (2024–2026)
- Pankaj Singh as Deepak Singh (2026)
- Aasim Khan as Rohit Chawla — Neeta's adoptive son (2025)
- Mrityunjay Thakur as Viraj — A reporter; Reet’s friend (2024–2026)
- Vishal Malhotra as Andy (2026)
- Diksha Thakur as Kaushalya — Kirti's mother (2025–2026)
- Manav Jalan as Kishore (2026) (Dead)
- Gouri Agarwal as Kirti — Raghav's obsessive lover (2025–2026)
- Puneet Raj as Vikrant (2025–2026)
- Garima Dixit as Bindiya (2026)

== Production ==
=== Development ===
Screenwriter Sonnal Kakar developed the central plot of Jaane Anjaane Hum Mile based on Aata Saata (brides exchange) tradition, a cultural practice involving the reciprocal marriage of siblings.

=== Premiere ===
The series premiered on 11 November 2024, replacing Kundali Bhagya in its 9.30 p.m. slot.

=== Release ===
The promo featuring Reet, an investigative journalist and Raghav, a volatile man - child released on October 2024.

=== Casting ===
Ayushi Khurana and Bharat Ahlawwat were confirmed to play Reet and Raghav. Jayati Bhatia was signed to play Sharda. In April 2025, Aasim Khan was reportedly confirmed to play Rohit. In May 2025, Bharat Narang joined the show as Sanju.
