= I, Me Aur Main =

2013 Hindi-language romantic comedy

- Theatrical release poster
- Directed by: Kapil Sharma
- Produced by: Goldie Behl; Shrishti Behl Arya
- Starring: John Abraham; Prachi Desai; Chitrangada Singh
- Cinematography: Himman Dhamija
- Edited by: Ranjeet Bahadur
- Music by: Falak Shabir; Sachin–Jigar; Gourav Dasgupta; Raghav Sachar
- Production company: Rose Films
- Distributed by: Reliance Entertainment
- Release date: 1 March 2013
- Running time: 105 minutes
- Country: India
- Language: Hindi
- Budget: est.₹200 million
- Box office: est.₹138.2 million

I, Me Aur Main (transl. I, me and myself) is a 2013 Indian Hindi-language romantic comedy film directed by Kapil Sharma. It stars John Abraham, Prachi Desai and Chitrangada Singh in lead roles. The film was released on 1 March 2013 and received mixed-to-negative reviews from critics.

== Plot ==
Ishaan (John), a charismatic, good-looking, self-centered, pompous, dependent and coquettish music producer from Mumbai, lives a sheltered existence as the apple of his mother's eye, always protected by his elder sister Shivani. He lives with his girlfriend Anushka (Chitrangdha) and takes her for granted. One day Anushka kicks him out of her house due to his irresponsibility about their relationship.

His new neighbor Gauri (Prachee) comes into his life, and he begins to fall in love with her. Ishaan is forced out of his company, and Gauri encourages him to start his own music company. While Ishaan is working on his music, Anushka is pregnant with his child but decides not to tell him that he is the father. A few days later, Ishaan learns that his ex-girlfriend is pregnant with his child. Gauri gets a scholarship to Paris, and Ishaan and Gauri decide to live there after his big launch.

On the day of the launch, Anushka starts having contractions, and Ishaan, realizing his responsibilities, takes Anushka to the hospital where they have a daughter. Gauri leaves for Paris, understanding what is happening. Eight months later, Ishaan and his baby girl Diya talk to Gauri, who is returning soon, while Anushka is happily married to another man.

== Cast ==
- John Abraham as Ishaan Sabharwal
- Prachi Desai as Gauri Dandekar
- Chitrangada Singh as Anushka Lal
- Zarina Wahab as Nisha Sabharwal, Ishaan's mother
- Priyanka Sharma as Taruni
- Errol Peter Marks as Tarun Mehra, Ishaan's best friend
- Raima Sen as Beena Chandok
- Sameer Soni as Agastya (in a special appearance)
- Sheena Shahabadi as Amala
- Deepti Gujral as Mrinalini
- Mini Mathur as Shivani Sabharwal, Ishaan's sister
- Sai Gundewar as Rafiq
- Amar Talwar as Mr. Sabharwal, Ishaan's father
- Micky Makhija as Mr. Narayan
- Mukul Chadda as Adil, Ishaan's brother-in-law
- Krish Chatterji as Rishi, Adil and Shivani's son
- Arlette Evita Grao as Shona
- Yugesh Anil as Gauri's friend
- Gyanesh as Akshay Tanwar
- viplav sahu as gym instructor

== Release ==
The film was earlier expected to release in December 2012; it was pushed to March 2013. The theatrical trailer was released on 28 January 2013.

== Reception ==
I, Me aur Main received mixed-to-negative reviews from critics. Alisha Coelho of in.com gave 3.5 stars out of 5 and said that the movie was "proof that a movie with John Abraham as the lead can be your time and money's worth and that Bollywood can (if it tried) make love stories that don't defy common sense and good taste." Nishi Tiwari for Rediff.com has given 2/5 stars and says I, Me Aur Main has its moments but falters badly with its plot. Simon Foster for sbs.com.au has given 2/5 stars and says "Action Man Fails To Make Dramatic Jump.

=== Box office ===
I, Me, Aur Main opened to poor collections. The film had little growth on the weekend, but the collections were still low and was eventually declared a flop.

== Soundtrack ==
I, Me Aur Main

Soundtrack album by Sachin–Jigar
- Released: February 5, 2013
- Genre: Film soundtrack
- Label: T-Series
- Producer: Reliance Entertainment

Sachin–Jigar chronology
Jayantabhai Ki Luv Story (2013)	I, Me Aur Main (2013)	Go Goa Gone (2012)

One song from Sridevi starrer 1989 Bollywood comedy film ChaalBaaz "Na Jaane Kahan Se Aayi Hai" was re-created in the film. The album consists of seven tracks composed by four musicians — Sachin–Jigar, Gourov Dasgupta, Pakistani artist Falak Shabir and Raghav Sachar. Musicperk.com rated the album 7.5/10 quoting "Saajna, Naa Jaane, Darbadar (written by Mayur Puri), Meri Jaaniye are the picks of the album." The track "Capuchino" was a rip-off from the original song "I'm Shipping Up to Boston" and the track "Na Jaane" is a rip-off of "Part-Time Lover" a 1985 single by Stevie Wonder, from his album In Square Circle.

=== Track listing ===
No.	Title	Lyrics	Music	Singer(s)	Length
1.	"Naa Jaane"	Kausar Munir	Sachin–Jigar	Neeraj Shridhar, Anushka Manchanda	3:11
2.	"Saajna"	Kumaar	Falak Shabir	Falak Shabir	4:42
3.	"Saajna (Unplugged)"	Kumaar	Falak Shabir	Falak Shabir	5:01
4.	"Capuchino"	Neelesh Mishra	Sachin-Jigar	Abhishek Nehwal	3:08
5.	"Darbadar"	Mayur Puri	Sachin-Jigar	Monali Thakur, Backing vocals: Divya Kumar, Harshit Chouhan, Altamash, Shaadab	3:26
6.	"Nasha Nasha"	Prashant Ingole	Raghav Sachar	Neha Bhasin	3:44
7.	"Meri Jaaniye"	Manthan	Gourov Dasgupta	Shaan, Monali Thakur	4:42
