= Modern Love Mumbai =

Indian anthology television series

- Promotional poster
- Genre: Drama; Anthology
- Based on: Modern Love by John Carney
- Written by: Vishal Bhardwaj; Alankrita Shrivastava; Hansal Mehta; Kashyap Kapoor; Dhruv Sehgal; Ankur Pathak; Nilesh Maniyar; Raghav Raj Kakker; Jyotsna Hariharan; Devika Bhagat; John Belanger
- Directed by: Shonali Bose; Vishal Bhardwaj; Hansal Mehta; Alankrita Shrivastava; Dhruv Sehgal; Nupur Asthana
- Starring: Fatima Sana Shaikh; Pratik Gandhi; Bhupendra Jadawat; Ranveer Brar; Tanuja; Meiyang Chang; Naseeruddin Shah; Sarika; Danesh Razvi; Masaba Gupta; Ritwik Bhowmik; Chitrangada Singh; Arshad Warsi; Wamiqa Gabbi
- Composers: Nikhil D'Souza; Ram Sampath; Jeet Gannguli; Shankar–Ehsaan–Loy; Vishal Bhardwaj; Gaurav Raina; Kamakshi Khanna
- Original language: Hindi
- No. of seasons: 1
- No. of episodes: 6

Production
- Cinematography: Tassaduq Hussain Mufti; Kavin Jagtiani; Pratham Mehta; Aniruddha Patankar; Sanket Shah; Akshay Singh
- Editors: Yasha Ramchandani; Antara Lahiri; A. Sreekar Prasad; Shan Mohammed; Charu Shree Roy; Maulik Sharma
- Production companies: The New York Times; Pritish Nandy Communications

Original release
- Network: Amazon Prime Video
- Release: 13 May 2022

Modern Love Mumbai is an Indian Hindi-language romantic comedy anthology series produced by Pritish Nandy that premiered on Amazon Prime Video on 13 May 2022. Its episodes run from 40 to 45 minutes.

Modern Love Mumbai is the Mumbai chapter based on the American anthology series Modern Love.

== Premise ==
Modern Love Mumbai - Exploring six unique yet universal stories of human connection and love in its varied forms, including romantic, platonic, parental, sexual, familial, marital and self-love, which are presented in six different episodes. It premiered on Amazon Prime Video on 13 May 2022.

== Cast ==
- Fatima Sana Shaikh as Lalzari "Lali"
- Bhupendra Jadawat as Lutfi
- Wamiqa Gabbi as Megha
- Tannishtha Chatterjee as Rayman
- Dilip Prabhavalkar as Nazrul
- Girija Oak as Kirti
- Shovon Jaman as Driver
- Pratik Gandhi as Manzar "Manzu" Ali
- Ranveer Brar as Rajveer
- Tanuja as Baai
- Kashmira Irani as Rehana
- Rushad Rana as Zohaib
- Talat Aziz as Shabbir
- Manasi Joshi Roy as Shaheen
- Meiyang Chang as Ming
- Yeo Yann Yann as Sui, Ming's mother
- Naseeruddin Shah as Pappi Singh
- Anurag Kashyap as Self
- Imaad Shah as Self
- Sarika as Dilbar Sodhi
- Danesh Razvi as Kunal
- Navneet Nishan as Raj Puri
- Purnima Rathod as Reena
- Yamini Das as Seema Sanghvi
- Ahsaas Channa as Siya
- Tanvi Azmi as Author Nilofer
- Rahul Vohra as Vijay Baijal
- Masaba Gupta as Saiba
- Ritwik Bhowmik as Parth
- Dolly Singh as Aashna
- Nazneen Madan as Reema
- Meherzan Mazda as Abdullah
- Prateik Babbar as Rohan
- Aadar Malik as Suhas
- Chitrangada Singh as Latika
- Arshad Warsi as Daniel "Danny"
- Flora Jacob as Daniel's mother
- Pushtii Shakti as Alicia Martins
- Mita Vashisht as Amal Ali

== Episodes ==
Series	Episodes	Originally released
1	6	13 May 2022

=== Season 1 (2022) ===
No. overall	No. in season	Title	Directed by
1	1	"Raat Rani (transl. Night Queen)"	Shonali Bose
Lali is a cook, and her husband Lutfi a security guard, in an upscale apartment in Mumbai, far from their native Kashmir. Long days end with ice cream - one cup, two spoons - until suddenly he dumps her, breaking her heart and shattering her dreams. All he leaves behind is his old bicycle. Together, can Lali and her cycle cross the bridge to a better life?
2	2	"Baai "	Hansal Mehta
Manzu, a gay man who grew up in a conservative household, is torn between the love for his partner and Baai, his ailing and ever doting grandmother. When he visits her in their ancestral home, the past catches up with him as the pain and pangs of his childhood take him back to a reality he had long left behind. After all these years, will Manzu find the strength to tell his truth to Baai?
3	3	"Mumbai Dragon"	Vishal Bhardwaj
The currency of love is different for all but for Sui, it is the food that she cooks for her son, Ming. When that is threatened by the entrance of his girlfriend Megha in Ming's life, Sui vows to the Warrior God, Kwan Tai Kwon, that she will not speak in Hindi until he brings her son back to her. Mumbai Dragon is Sui's journey of realizing that sometimes letting go is the truest form of love.
4	4	"My Beautiful Wrinkles"	Alankrita Shrivastava
Dilbar Sodhi tries to grapple with a young man's declaration of sexual interest in her. It sets her on a path of dealing with the baggage from her past, and re-discovering the joy of life.
5	5	"I Love Thane"	Dhruv Sehgal
About Saiba's journey of finding the right modern man amidst the plethora of men on dating apps. However, life has other plans for her when she meets someone who is not the 'modern man' she had set out to find and is timeless.
6	6	"Cutting Chai "	Nupur Asthana
In her 40s, Latika is caught in the humdrum of marriage and motherhood and regrets not having fulfilled her dream of being a novelist. On one eventful day, she finds herself re-evaluating all her choices in life thus far, even her marriage. As bittersweet memories and 'what if' fantasies run parallel in her mind, she understands that questioning her past is futile, the answers all lie within her.

== Music ==
=== Track listing ===
Modern Love Mumbai (Original Series Soundtrack)
No.	Title	Writer(s)	Singer	Length
1.	"Mausam Hai Pyaar"	Pinky Poonawala	Nikhil D’Souza	3:22
2.	"Raat Rani"	Ginny Diwan	Nikhita Gandhi	2:52
3.	"Kaisi Baatein Karte Ho"	Sameer Rahat	Sonu Nigam	4:30
4.	"Shuru Se Shuru"	Tanishk S Nabar	Shankar Mahadevan, Shashaa Tirupati	2:49
5.	"Raat Bhar"	Vishal Bhardwaj	Meiyang Chang	3:13
6.	"Yaadein"	Ankur Tewari	Kamakshi Khanna	2:44
7.	"The Same"	Neel Adhikari	Karsh Kale, Kashishi	4:02
Total length:				23:33

== Reception ==
Pallabi Dey Purkayastha of The Times of India rated the film 4 out of 5 stars and wrote "Modern Love Mumbai navigates a wide range of topics, toppling barriers along the way, and what it has essentially taught me is that if external love is your only currency, then you will be spent". Priyanka Sharma of Pinkvilla rated the series 4 out of 5 stars and wrote "A layered, hopeful & brilliant anthology with heartfelt performances". Swati Chopra of The Quint rated the series 3.5 out of 5 stars and wrote "Review: ‘Modern Love Mumbai’ Is a Tad Slow, but Love Saves the Day". Saibal Chatterjee of NDTV rated the series 3.5 out of 5 stars and wrote "No matter what the gender of the director is or what the essential tilt of each story is, it is the women, both the fictional characters and the performers who portray them, who make the anthology worthwhile". Anuj Kumar of The Hindu stated "With compelling performances that accompany these poetic yet truthful representations in Modern Love: Mumbai, the shorts arrive like a breath of fresh air and leave us with a guileless smile".

== See also ==
- Modern Love Chennai, Chennai chapter of Modern Love
- Modern Love Hyderabad, Hyderabad chapter of Modern Love
