= Unpaused: Naya Safar =

- Promotional release poster
- Directed by: Nupur Asthana; Ayappa KM; Ruchir Arun; Shikha Makan; Nagraj Manjule
- Written by: Nupur Asthana; Samina Motlekar; Shubham; Ayappa KM; Ruchir Arun; Abhinandan Sridhar; Shikha Makan; Nagraj Manjule; Sudhir Kulkarni
- Produced by: Pranati Nagarsheth; Anand Menon; Shujaat Saudagar; Vikesh Bhutani; Paramvir Singh; Ashwini Sidwani
- Starring: Shreya Dhanwanthary; Priyanshu Painyuli; Geetanjali Kulkarni; Saqib Saleem; Ashish Verma; Sam Mohan; Darshana Rajendran; Lakshvir Singh Saran; Neena Kulkarni; Nagraj Manjule
- Cinematography: Rounak Ameriya; Soumik Mukherjee; Aniruddha Patankar; Paramvir Singh; Harshvardhan Waghdhare
- Edited by: Omkar Uttam Sakpal
- Music by: Tajdar Junaid; Anurag Saikia; Japjisingh Valecha
- Production companies: Pink Window Productions; Early Man Film; Chalkboard Entertainment; The Three Film Company; Aatpat Films
- Distributed by: Amazon Prime Video
- Release date: 21 January 2022
- Country: India
- Language: Hindi

Unpaused: Naya Safar is a 2022 Indian Hindi-language anthology film consisting of five short segments directed by Nupur Asthana, Ayappa KM, Ruchir Arun, Shikha Makan, and Nagraj Manjule. It premiered on 21 January 2022 on Amazon Prime Video.

It is a sequel to Unpaused (2020).

== Cast ==
The Couple (Nupur Asthana)

- Shreya Dhanwanthary as Akriti
- Priyanshu Painyuli as Dippy

War Room (Ayyapa KM)

- Geetanjali Kulkarni as Sangeeta Waghmare

Teen Tigaadaa (Ruchir Arun)

- Saqib Saleem as Chandan
- Sam Mohan as Ajeet
- Ashish Verma as Dimple

Gond Ke Laddo (Nitya Mehra)

- Darshana Rajendran as Geetanjali
- Lakshvir Singh Saran as Rohan
- Neena Kulkarni as Sushila Tripathi

Vaikunth (Nagraj Manjule)

- Nagraj Manjule as Vikas Chavan
