= The Great Indian Butterfly =

- Directed by: Sarthak Dasgupta
- Written by: Sarthak Dasgupta
- Produced by: Sanjay Gupta; Parth Arora
- Starring: Aamir Bashir; Sandhya Mridul; Koel Purie; Barry John
- Cinematography: Shanker Raman
- Edited by: Vivek Shah; Shan Mohammed
- Release dates: 11 November 2007 (Indo-American Arts Council Film Festival); 2 April 2010 (India)
- Running time: 94 minutes
- Country: India
- Language: English

The Great Indian Butterfly is a 2007 Indian romance drama film, written and directed by Sarthak Dasgupta. It is the story of a typical modern Indian couple and their journey to Goa in quest of a magical insect, and in turn, peace, love and happiness in life, which lies within ourselves. The language of the film was English.

The film was theatrically released on 2 April 2010 and emerged as a commercial failure.

== Plot ==
A planned vacation to Goa goes awry for two stressed-out Mumbai-based employees, after Krish (Aamir Bashir) oversleeps, and as a result he and his wife, Meera (Sandhya Mridul) miss the plane. They, nevertheless, decide to make use of their time and drive there by car so that he can locate and view The Great Indian Butterfly. Last seen by the unknown Portuguese explorer Carodiguez, in a remote Karthikey valley located in erstwhile colonial Goa, the butterfly possesses a magical aura, granting immense happiness to the person who catches it.

In the journey that takes the couple from the smog filled, concrete jungle of the Megalopolis of Mumbai through the little discovered coastal landscapes of the western Sahyadris, to the sun soaked land of Goa, the couple lose more than what they want to rediscover. It becomes a passage, which seems to travel with a metaphor of its own and an insect as elusive as a fossil trapped in prehistoric resin.

Their journey will be acrimonious as Meera must also deal with work-related stress, loss of a promotion, as well as accuse her husband of not being intimate with her on one hand, and on the other remaining in close contact and having an affair with his ex-girlfriend, Liza (Koel Purie).

Will they find the Butterfly? Can they survive the journey? Can it cost them their lives? Will the Great Indian Butterfly wreak havoc on their souls? Will there be redemption? Or is it a futile hunt for an answer to their crumbling lives? Is happiness a rare insect? A simple tale in the complex miasma of a changing India.

== Cast ==
- Aamir Bashir as Krish Kumar
- Sandhya Mridul as Meera K. Kumar
- Koel Purie as Liza
- Barry John
- Gourov Dasgupta
- Shibani Kashyap as herself

== Production ==
=== Filming ===
The filming took place during late 2004 with majority of the film shot in Goa.

== Release ==
The film was released on 2 April 2010, being a delayed release.

== Reception ==
Preeti Arora of Rediff.com gave the film 3 stars out of 5, observing, "The narrative flows mainly due to the spirited performances by the lead pair." Having got appreciation for Mridul's portrayal, she wrote, "A versatile actress, she's almost always cast as the tough, I-don't-give-a-damn character. But she also reveals a softer side to her personality. She conveys her pain, her grief as effectively as her brashness." She also had praise for Bashir's acting performance, writing, "Matching pace with her is Amir's calmer and restrained performance."

Tushar Joshi of Mid-Day wrote, "Even though the butterfly might be an allegorical reference to Krish and Meera's independence and freedom from their suffocating relationship, it doesn't really add anything to the plot. Trying to weave a fable of a mythical butterfly seems gimmicky for this plot."
