= Drona (2008 film) =

2008 Indian film by Goldie Behl

- Theatrical release poster
- Directed by: Goldie Behl
- Written by: Goldie Behl; Jaydeep Sarkar
- Produced by: Shrishti Arya; Sunil Lulla; Amitabh Bachchan
- Starring: Abhishek Bachchan; Priyanka Chopra; Kay Kay Menon; Jaya Bachchan
- Cinematography: Sameer Arya
- Edited by: Shyam K. Salgonkar
- Music by: Dhruv Ghanekar
- Production company: Rose Audio Visuals
- Distributed by: Eros International
- Release date: 2 October 2008
- Running time: 145 minutes
- Country: India
- Language: Hindi
- Budget: ₹43 crore
- Box office: ₹15 crore

Drona is a 2008 Indian Hindi-language superhero film directed by Goldie Behl, starring Abhishek Bachchan, Priyanka Chopra, Kay Kay Menon and Jaya Bachchan. Drona's special effects shots were worked on by EyeQube, headed by Charles Darby and David Bush. The movie features Indian martial arts such as Kalaripayattu, Chhau, Gatka, and sword fighting. It was filmed in Prague, Bikaner, Maharashtra, Rajasthan, and Namibia.

Made on a budget of ₹45 crore, the film earned less than ₹15 crore and was a disaster at the box office.

== Cast ==
- Abhishek Bachchan as Aditya 'Adi' (Drona)
- Priyanka Chopra as Sonia
- Kay Kay Menon as Riz Raizada
- Jaya Bachchan as Queen Jayanti
- Ali Haji as Young Drona
- Conan Stevens as Demon

== Production ==
The movie was produced with a budget of over ₹45 crore (US$4.7 million) on special effects with VFX experts 60 working on the movie for over 6 months. Mainly, the team collaborated with EyeQube Studios with Eros to achieve quality effects. The crew contained 250 visual effects artists, animators, designers, painters and developers.

== Reception ==
Sukanya Verma of Rediff gave the film 2.5 stars and mentioned, "Considering its fantastical theme, Drona is officially escapist and hence isn't obligated to broadcast logic beyond conveying 'good wins over evil' and 'conquer your fear by facing it' message." Khalid Mohamed of Hindustan Times writes, "Like it or not, Drona is artless, arrogant, brazenly derivative and terribly acted by one and all (except for that puckish dwarf maybe)."

== Soundtrack ==
Drona

Soundtrack album by Dhruv Ghanekar
- Released: 6 September 2008
- Genre: Feature film soundtrack
- Label: Eros Music

No.	Title	Singer(s)	Length
1.	"Bandagi"	Roop Kumar Rathod, Sunidhi Chauhan
2.	"Drona (Title Song)"	Dhruv Ghanekar
3.	"Drona (Title Song - Version 2)"	Sunidhi Chauhan
4.	"Nanhe Nanhe"	Sadhana Sargam, Nandini Srikar
5.	"Khushi"	Shaan, Suzanne DMello, Francois Castellino, Dean Devlin, Sunaina Gupta
6.	"Oop Cha"	Sunidhi Chauhan, Nandini Srikar
7.	"Oop Cha (remix)"	Sunidhi Chauhan, Nandini Srikar
