= Hello Mini =

Indian web series streaming on MX Player

- Genre: Suspense; Thriller
- Based on: The Stranger Trilogy by Novoneel Chakraborty
- Screenplay by: Anand Sivakumaran; Akshay Vishwanath
- Directed by: Faruk Kabir
- Starring: Anuja Joshi
- Country of origin: India
- Original language: Hindi
- No. of seasons: 3
- No. of episodes: 35

Production
- Producers: Srishti Behl Arya; Sameer Nair; Deepak Segal; Jay Dev Banerjee
- Editors: Arjun Srivasstava; Satya Sharma; Sumanth Sharma
- Running time: 25 mins
- Production companies: Applause Entertainment Ltd. & Indigo Creation Production

Original release
- Network: MX Player
- Release: 1 October 2019 – 22 April 2021

Hello Mini is a romantic-thriller web series about a young girl Mini and her stalker, who is both a blessing and a curse. Directed by Faruk Kabir, the series is an adaptation of novels written by Novoneel Chakraborty and Croctales. The web show features Anuja Joshi who plays the titular character Mini. The series is available for streaming on MX Player and the Season 1 was aired on 1 October 2019. The show's second season streamed on 26 February 2021 followed immediately by third season on 22 April 2021.

== Plot ==
Young 22-year-old Rivanah shifts to Mumbai from Kolkata and notices that someone is following and blackmailing her. This someone is voiceless, faceless, nameless and is forcing her to "know her worth". Even though he is stalking her and making her miserable, she is drawn to the Stranger and soon realizes that he is actually helping her. But everything comes at a cost, as the stranger's obsession with her and eventually hers with him leads her down a dangerous path, affecting her life and the lives of all those around her.

== Cast and characters ==
Actor	Character	Description	Seasons		
Actor	Character	Description	1	2	3
Anuja Joshi	Rivanah Banerjee a.k.a. "Mini"	a 22 year young talented Bengali girl, a software engineer in Mumbai	Main	Main	Main
Mrinal Dutt	Danny Abraham	a 23 year young struggling actor who was Mini's 2nd ex-boyfriend	Main	Main	Main
Anshul Pandey	Ekansh Tripathi	a software engineer in Bangalore who was Mini's 1st ex-boyfriend and then Tista's fiancee	Main	Main	Main
Priya Banerjee	Ishita Shetty	a 22 year young air hostess with a carefree attitude who was Mini's roommate and her bestie	Main	Guest	
Arjun Aneja	Prateek Basotia	a software engineer who is Mini's schoolmate then colleague. He one-sidedly loved her since his schooldays	Main		
Gaurav Chopra	Aditya Grover		Main	Main	
Anjuman Saxena	Mrs. Banerjee	Mini's mother	Recurring	Recurring	Recurring
Dhananjay Kapoor	Mr. Banerjee	Mini's father	Recurring	Recurring	Recurring
Riya Bhattacharjee	Megha	Mini's cousin sister who lived with her husband in Mumbai	Recurring		
Rohit Bhardwaj	Adil	Megha's husband	Recurring		
Nikhita Chopra	Nitya	a journalist who was Danny's best friend and killed by Vixy and Viraat	Guest	Main	
Vineet Sharma	Inspector Mohan Kamble	a sincere police officer who always stands and supports Mini	Recurring	Recurring	Recurring
Joy Sengupta	Shridhar	Tech Sky Ltd. company MD	Recurring	Recurring	
Nitesh Kumar	Vinay	Mini's colleague at Tech Sky Ltd. company	Recurring	Recurring	
Sandeep Dhabale	Mukund	Mini's colleague at Tech Sky Ltd. company	Recurring	Recurring	
Sidhhaarth Dhanda	Ashish	Mini's colleague at Tech Sky Ltd. company	Recurring	Recurring	
Tamara D’souza	Asha	a yoga trainer who is Mini's other roommate	Recurring		
Ankur Rathee	Abhiraj Mukherjee	Mini's ex-fiance who arranged by her parents also he started one-sidedly loved her	Recurring		
Darshana Banik	Tista Roy	a software engineer also a hacker who works in Tech Sky Ltd. company and Mini's best friend also Ekansh's fiancee who suddenly dead due to cancer		Main	Main
Abhinav Sharma	Viraat	Dead Defey's creator, (a dark web; sexual game) who was doing an illegal business. then returned through Séance session at Solace to revenge against Mini		Main	Main
Ambika Nayak	Vixy	Viraat's stepsister who is also a partner in Dark Defey and one-sidedly loved her brother then killed herself		Main	
Suchitra Pillai	KD Maa	A head in Séance session at Solace who was doing an illegal business			Main
Vibhav Roy	Nivaan	Mini's best friend and her love interest ("The Stranger")	Guest	Guest	Main
Nirisha Basnett	Ruhi	a servant girl in Séance session at Solace, KD Maa's P.A. who took a revenge against KD Maa and one-sidedly loved Viraat			Main
Vikrant Koul	Argho	Hiya's cousin brother also Mini's new M.D. who misjudged Mini			Main
Summer Jacobs	Priyansha Galgotiya	a participant and addicted in Dark Defey who was Viraat's love interest and later became good friend to Mini		Main	Main
Om Kanojiya	Chotu	Mini's student	Recurring		
Tulsi Prajapati	Reena	Mini's student	Recurring		
Tanishka Vishe	Ratna	A girl who was helped by Mini from rapist	Recurring		
Sanya Bansal	Pooja	Mini's collegemate	Recurring		Recurring
Tanvi Shinde	Hiya Chowdhury	Mini's collegemate who killed herself by hanging	Recurring	Recurring	Main
Subha Rajput	Advika	a paralyzed girl, Nivaan's wife			Recurring
Sanjay Gurbaxani	Manick Dutta	a hypnotist who is Mr. Banerjee's best friend	Recurring	Recurring	Recurring
Abhishek Sharma	Abhay Singhania	a participant and addicted in Dark Defey who was Nitya's ex-boyfriend		Recurring	

== Release ==
The official trailer of the web series was launched on 26 September 2019, by MX Player on YouTube and the show was available for free streaming on MX Player from 1 October 2019. For the second season, trailer was released on 17 February 2021 and the series was released on 26 February 2021 on MX Player.

== Awards ==
Won at E4m Play Awards 2020 - Best Thriller / Horror Show on Web - Bronze
