= Novoneel Chakraborty =

Indian Author of fiction

- Born: 27 October 1984 (age 41); Silchar, Assam, India
- Occupation: Author
- Writing career
- Language: English
- Genre: Erotic Thrillers

Novoneel Chakraborty is an Indian author and scriptwriter.

== Early life and career ==
Chakraborty was born in Silchar, Assam and has lived in Assam, West Bengal and Uttar Pradesh. He did his schooling at Cathedral School, Lucknow.

His first book, A thing beyond forever, was published in 2009. In 2019, he began writing for digital storytelling platform Wattpad using the pen name Elizabeth Eli.

His book "The Forever series" found its place in Times of India's Most Stunning Books of 2017.

His thriller series The Stranger Trilogy was translated into six Indian languages and has been adapted into a web series titled Hello Mini by Applause Entertainment and Rose movies. His thriller novel Black Suits You has been adapted by AltBalaji into web series Bekaboo.

== List of Works ==
=== Novels ===
- A thing beyond forever (September 2010)
- That Kiss in the Rain (November 2011)
- How about a SIN tonight? (May 2012)
- Ex...a twisted love story (October 2013)
- The Stranger Trilogy
  - Marry me, Stranger (November 2014)
  - All yours, Stranger (July 2015)
  - Forget me not, Stranger (April 2016)
- Black suits you (November 2016)
- "Forever Series"
  - Forever Is a Lie (August 2017)
  - Forever Is True (October 2017)
- Cheaters (February 2018)
- The Best Couple Ever (October 2018)
- Red Suits You (October 2018)
- Half Torn Hearts (February 2019)
- Do You Love Me Enough? (June 2019)
- Roses Are Blood Red (December 2019)
- Chill Down the Spine (April 2020)
- Cross Your Heart, Take My Name (November 2020)
- Whisper To Me Your Lies (October 2021)
- A Thousand Kisses Deep (July 2022)
- Heart On The Edge (December 2022)
- The Heartbreak Club: One Girl Vs One Twisted Legacy (March 2024)
- Remember Me As Yours (June 2024)
- The Heartbreak Club 2: No Time to Blink (April 2025)
- The Heartbreak Club (Comic Book) (April 2026)

=== Television ===
- Million Dollar Girl (Channel V)
- Secret Diaries (Channel V)
- Twist Waala Love (Channel V)
- Pyaar Tuney Kya Kiya (Zing TV / MTV)
- Savdhaan India (star bharat)
- Mann Mein Vishwas Hai (Sony)
- Love is in the stories (Romedy Now)

=== Web series ===
- Marry Me, Stranger as "Hello Mini" (2019) released on MX Player
- All Yours, Stranger as "Hello Mini 2" (2021) released on MX Player
- Forgot me not, Stranger as "Hello Mini 3" (2021) released on MX Player
- Black Suits You as "Bekaboo" (2019) released on (ALTBalaji)
- "Rejctx" (2019) released on ZEE5 original
- "Rejctx 2" (2020) released on ZEE5 originals
- Forever Series as "Roohaniyat" (2022) on MX Player
- The Heartbreak Club: One Girl Vs One Twisted Legacy as Kill Dill – The Heartbreak Club (2025) on Amazon MX Player
