= Kayan (musician) =

Indian musician

Ambika Nayak, known professionally as Kayan, is an Indian musician, singer and disc jockey.

Her stage name, Kayan, is derived from reversing her surname "Nayak". Additionally, she is also a part of the group Kimochi Youkai and the electronic music duo Nothing Anonymous with Nirmit Shah. According to Nayak, her family was already musically inclined, with her mother being a Hindustani classical vocalist and her grandmother, a Kathak dancer, and she was thus able to get substantial exposure and training.

By the end of 2021, she was reportedly one of the most streamed female indie artists on Spotify.

In 2022, she released her seventh and eighth singles DFWM (abbreviation of Don't Fuck With Me) and No Shade, the latter of which featured Singaporean rapper Yung Raja.

== Reception ==
The magazine Man's World praised her live DJ sets as "passionately genre-agnostic, driven by feel and an inexplicable sixth-sense tied to her spectators", and claimed that they had been key to her overall musical popularity.

== Discography ==
Singles

- Cool Kids (2020)
- Please (2020)
- Be Alright (2021)
- On My Own (2021)
- DFWM (2022)
- No Shade (2023)
- 52 (2023)
- stop calling me (2023)
- plenty (2023)
- Attention (2024)
- Kayan Home Sessions (2024)
- Heartrate (2024)
- Hold Me Down (2025)
- Hold Me Down (Unplugged) (2025)

EPs

- Is Love Enough? (2025)

== Filmography ==
=== Web series ===
Year	Title	Role	Notes	Ref
2021	Hello Mini	Vixy	Season 2	
