= Chitrangada Singh =

Indian actress (born 1976)

Chitrangda Singh
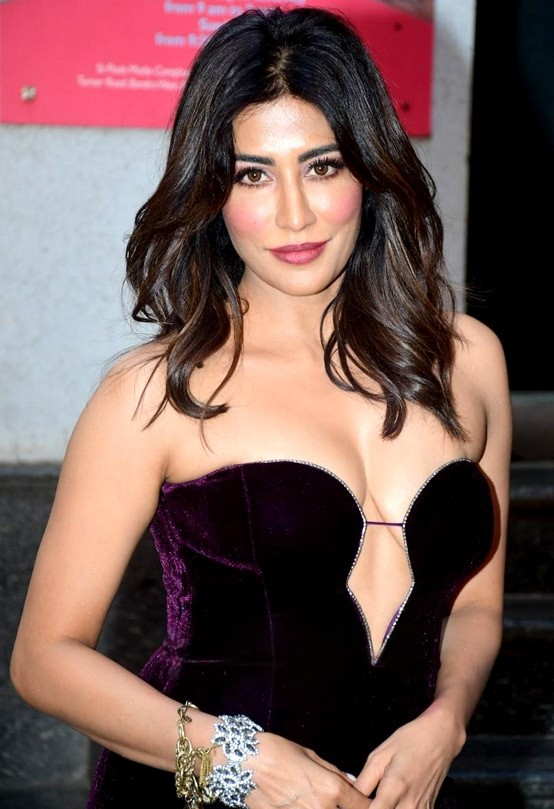
- Singh in 2025
- Born: 30 August 1975 (age 51); Jodhpur, Rajasthan, India
- Occupation: Actress
- Years active: 2005–present
- Spouse: Jyoti Randhawa (m. 2001; div. 2014)
- Children: 1
- Family: Digvijay Singh Chahal (brother), Chitra Sarwara (sister in law)

Chitrangda Singh (born 30 August 1975) is an Indian actress who works primarily in Hindi films. She made her acting debut with the crime drama Hazaaron Khwaishein Aisi (2005), which earned her the Bollywood Movie Award for Best Female Debut.

Singh is known for her appearance in the crime thriller Yeh Saali Zindagi (2011), the romantic comedies Desi Boyz (2011) and I, Me Aur Main (2013), the financial thriller Baazaar (2018), the crime thriller Bob Biswas (2021) and the mystery thriller Gaslight (2023).She turned producer with the sports drama Soorma (2018). Singh has since appeared in the series Modern Love Mumbai (2022) and Khakee: The Bengal Chapter (2025). From 2001 to 2014, Singh was married to golfer Jyoti Randhawa with whom she has a son.

== Early life and family ==
Singh was born on 30 August 1975 in Meerut, Uttar Pradesh, growing up there as well as in Kota, Rajasthan, and also Bareilly and Sophia Girls' School, Meerut in Uttar Pradesh, the latter city being the last where her father, Col. Niranjan Singh, an ex-Indian Army officer with a transferable job, was posted. Her brother Digvijay Singh Chahal is a golfer. After her schooling in Meerut at Sophia Girls' School, she completed her graduation in Home Science (food and nutrition) from Lady Irwin College, New Delhi.

== Career ==
=== Breakthrough and struggles (2005-2010) ===
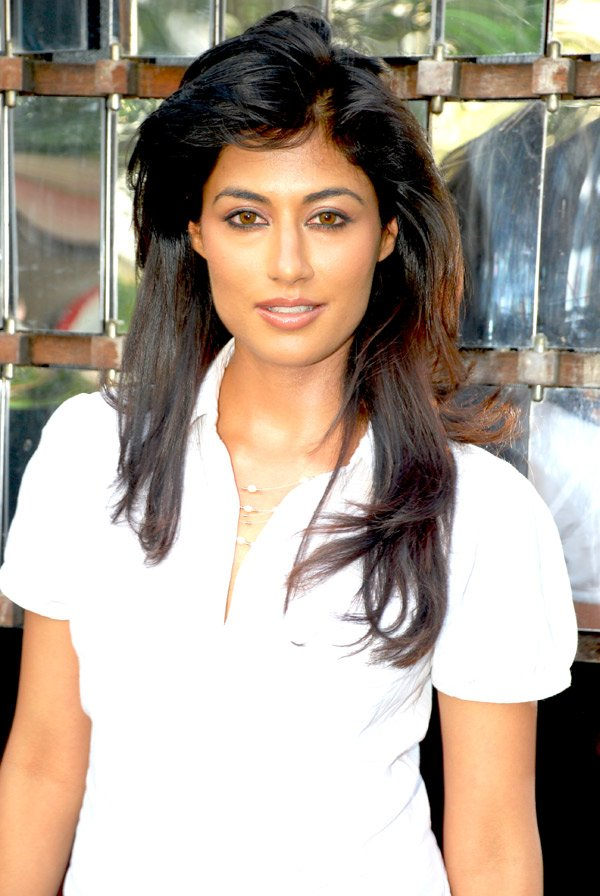
Singh in 2008 promoting her film Sorry Bhai!

Singh began her career as a model before making the transition to the silver screen. After completing her graduation, she began modelling. She later drew attention after performing in the music video Sunset Point by Gulzar, followed by a music video with Abhijeet Bhattacharya.

Singh made her film debut with Sudhir Mishra's Hazaaron Khwaishein Aisi in 2005. The film received critical acclaim and was a box office average. Singh played Geeta, a college student and social worker opposite Kay Kay Menon. Sukanya Verma stated, "Chitrangada is definitely someone to watch out for. She is a complete natural who zaps the camera with a passionate performance." John Pancake of The Washington Post noted her for giving "her character a deep sense of dignity and decency." Her next release, Kal: Yesterday and Tomorrow was a critical and commercial failure.

Following a three year hiatus, Singh returned to films opposite Sanjay Suri in Onir's Sorry Bhai!. Its release over the weekend of the Mumbai terror attacks and was a failure at the box office. This failure led to another two years break from acting.

=== Commercial films and fluctuations (2011–2020) ===
Singh started 2011 with Sudhir Mishra's Yeh Saali Zindagi, where she played a club singer Priti opposite Irrfan Khan. Despite positive reviews, it emerged an average grosser. Rajeev Masand noted, "Chitrangada uses her smouldering looks to create a mysterious character whose motivations and actions are unclear." Singh then played Tanya, an economics professor opposite Akshay Kumar in Rohit Dhawan's Desi Boyz. Taran Adarsh stated, "Chitrangada looks stunning and acts well, but her character isn't convincing." The film emerged a moderate success. In 2012, she performed a dance number in Shirish Kunder's Joker.

Singh had three releases in 2013. She first appeared as a prostitute in the short film Kirchiyaan. She then played an ambitious Maya opposite Arjun Rampal in Sudhir Mishra's Inkaar, which was box office average despite positive reviews. Rachit Gupta of Filmfare praised her performance and chemistry with Rampal. Singh later played Anushka a career women, in Kapil Sharma's I, Me Aur Main opposite John Abraham, which was a box office failure. This was followed by a dance number in Anjaan (2014) and Gabbar Is Back (2015) and a special appearance in Munna Michael (2018).

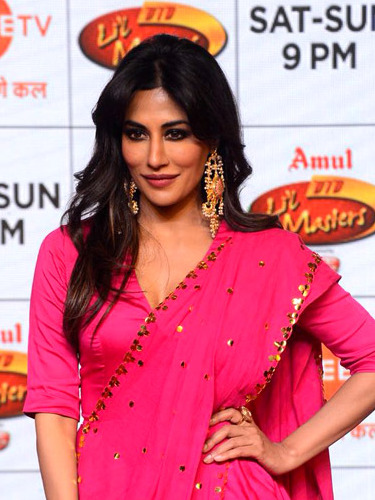
Singh on her television show in 2018

Singh turned a producer in 2018, with the biographical sports drama film Soorma, which was released under her banner C.S. Films and received positive response. She then played a mistress Suhani in Tigmanshu Dhulia's Saheb, Biwi Aur Gangster 3 opposite Sanjay Dutt, which flopped at the box office. In her last film of the year, Singh played Mandira, a businessman's wife opposite Saif Ali Khan in Gauravv K. Chawla's Baazaar. That year, she also ventured into television as a judge with DID Li'l Masters 4. With no release in 2019, she had a cameo appearance in Ghoomketu in 2020.

=== Career expansion and success (2021-present) ===
In 2021, Singh played Mary, an assassin's wife opposite Abhishek Bachchan in Diya Annapurna Ghosh's Bob Biswas. Anuj Kumar of The Hindu published, "Chitrangada gets a solid part as the ravishing wife of Bob. Though she doesn’t always succeed in shedding the uber-chic baggage, but her Mary shines among the wimpy men around her." In 2022, Singh expanded to OTT with the anthology series Modern Love Mumbai, playing Latika, an aspiring novelist opposite Arshad Warsi.

In 2023, Singh played Rukmani, a royal queen alongside Vikrant Massey in Gaslight. Saibal Chatterjee stated, "Chitrangada plays a woman whose allure lies in her ability to mask her desires and secrets behind a benign facade. She pulls it off for the most part." Following this, Singh appeared as Kadambari, in a cameo appearance in Khel Khel Mein.

In her first release of 2025, Singh played the leader of opposition in the series Khakee: The Bengal Chapter. Sugandha Rawal of Hindustan Times took note of her "commanding performance", while several reviews criticised her faltered character. She then played a businesswoman opposite Jackie Shroff in Housefull 5. The film was released in two versions, titled Housefull 5A and Housefull 5B, each featuring a different climax and murderer. Devesh Sharma stated that she adds to the "glamour quotient", but has nothing to do in the film. In late 2025, Singh appeared opposite Salman Khan in the Hindi-language war drama film Maatrubhumi: May War Rest In Peace, directed by Apoorva Lakhia. The film is produced by Salman Khan Films and is scheduled for theatrical release on 4 December 2026.

== Personal life ==
After a five-year-long courtship, Singh married golfer Jyoti Randhawa in 2001. They have a son Zorawar, born in 2008. The couple got separated in 2013 and were formally divorced in April 2015. The custody of their son was granted to Singh.

== Media image ==
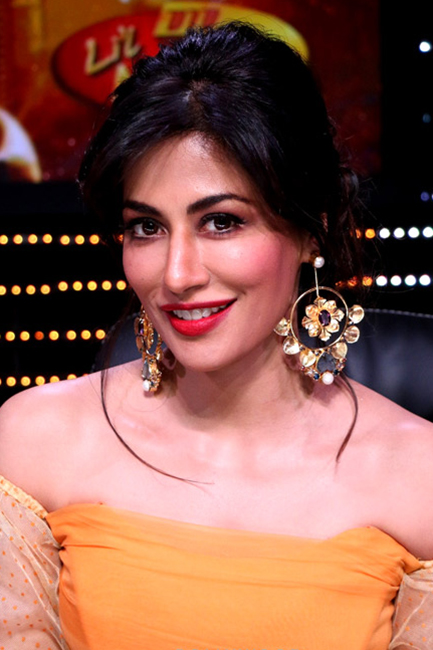
Singh in 2018

For her performance in Hazaaron Khwaishein Aisi, Singh was placed in Rediff.com's "Best Bollywood Debut Ever" list. In Rediff.com's "Best Bollywood Actresses", she was placed 10th in 2005. In the Times Most Desirable Women list, Singh was placed 11th in 2011 and 4th in 2012. Singh is a celebrity endorser for several brands such as Airtel, Parachute, Puma, Garnier, Tanishq, Titan Eye Plus, Dollar Missy, and Joyalukkas.

== Filmography ==
Key
†	Denotes films that have not yet been released

=== Films ===
Year	Title	Role	Notes	Ref.
2005	Hazaaron Khwaishein Aisi	Geeta Rao		
2005	Kal: Yesterday and Tomorrow	Bhavana Dayal		
2008	Sorry Bhai!	Aaliyah		
2011	Yeh Saali Zindagi	Priti Shirodkar		
2011	Desi Boyz	Tanya Sharma		
2012	Joker	Herself	Special appearance in song "Kafirana"	
2013	Kirchiyaan	Ritu	Short film	
2013	Inkaar	Maya Luthra		
2013	I, Me Aur Main	Anushka Lal		
2014	Anjaan	Herself	Tamil film; special appearance in song "Sirippu En"	
2015	Gabbar Is Back	Herself	Special appearance in song "Aao Raja"	
2017	Munna Michael	Judge of Dancing Star	Cameo appearance	
2018	Soorma	—N/a	Producer	
2018	Saheb, Biwi Aur Gangster 3	Suhani		
2018	Baazaar	Mandira Kothari		
2020	Ghoomketu	Herself	Cameo appearance	
2021	Bob Biswas	Mary Biswas		
2023	Gaslight	Rukmani Singh Gaikwad		
2024	Khel Khel Mein	Kadambari Kapoor	Cameo appearance	
2025	Housefull 5	Maya		
2025	Parikrama	Rupa	Indo–Italian film	
2025	Raat Akeli Hai: The Bansal Murders	Meera Bansal	Netflix film	
2026	Maatrubhumi: May War Rest in Peace †	TBA	Post-production	

=== Television ===
Year	Title	Role	Notes	Ref.
2018	DID Li'l Masters 4	Judge		
2022	Modern Love Mumbai	Latika	Episode: "Cutting Chai"	
2025	Khakee: The Bengal Chapter	Nibedita Basak		

== Awards and nominations ==
Year	Film	Award	Category	Result	Ref.
2006	Hazaaron Khwaishein Aisi	Bollywood Movie Awards	Best Female Debut	Won	
2006	Hazaaron Khwaishein Aisi	Zee Cine Awards	Best Female Debut	Nominated	
2006	Hazaaron Khwaishein Aisi	Screen Awards	Best Female Debut	Nominated	
2006	Hazaaron Khwaishein Aisi	Producers Guild Film Awards	Best Actress in a Leading Role	Nominated	
2009	Sorry Bhai!	Stardust Awards	Superstar of Tomorrow – Female	Nominated	
2014	Inkaar	Screen Awards	Best Actress	Nominated	
2022	Bob Biswas	Hit List OTT Awards	Best Supporting Actor - Female	Nominated	
2025	Khakee: The Bengal Chapter	Bollywood Hungama Style Icons	Most Stylish Trendsetter of the Year	Won	
