= Goldie Behl =

Indian film director

- Behl in 2014
- Born: 24 January 1978 (age 48); Mumbai, Maharashtra, India
- Occupations: Director, screenwriter, producer
- Spouse: Sonali Bendre (m. 2002)
- Children: 1
- Parent: Ramesh Behl (father)
- Relatives: Ravi Behl (first-cousin); Kamal Kapoor (maternal-grandfather)

Goldie Behl (born 24 January 1978) is an Indian filmmaker belonging to the Behl family of Hindi films. He is married to Sonali Bendre.

== Early life ==
Goldie is related to many eminent people in the Hindi film industry through both his parents. His father is the director Ramesh Behl, whose brother is another noted film director, Shyam Behl. Shukla Devi Tuli, wife of superstar Rajendra Kumar Tuli, is his paternal aunt. Thus, the actor Kumar Gaurav is Goldie's paternal first cousin; as are actor Ravi Behl and actress Geeta Behl, the children of Shyam Behl.

Goldie's mother is a daughter of actor Kamal Kapoor, who was a first cousin of Prithviraj Kapoor (they were the children of two sisters, both of whom were married to men named "Kapoor").

Goldie has a sister, Shrishti Arya, who is into software production and has co-produced many films with her brother.

== Career ==
As student of Mayo College, Behl trained within the Mumbai Film Industry, born on 24 January 1978. In 2001, he made his directorial debut with the film Bas Itna Sa Khwaab Hai (That’s All I Dream of) starring Abhishek Bachchan, Rani Mukherji, Sushmita Sen and Jackie Shroff. Behl then co-founded Rose-audiovisuals which has released shows such as Lipstick, Remix songs and Kabhi Haan Kabhi Na on Indian television network. Drona was his second film, with fantasy-action and special effects amalgamating Indian mythology with pure fantasy, and fusing a contemporary storyline.

== Personal life ==
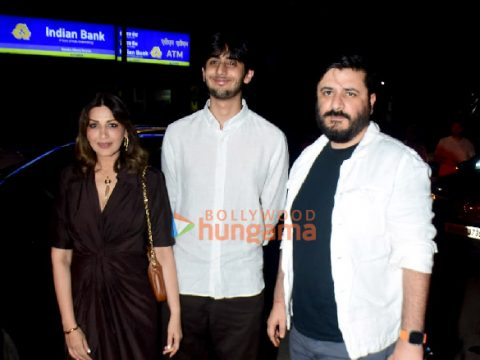
Behl (right) with wife Sonali Bendre and son Ranveer in 2025

Goldie married film actress Sonali Bendre on 12 November 2002. Their son, Ranveer Behl, was born on 11 August 2005 at the Breach Candy Hospital in Mumbai.

== Filmography ==
=== Director ===
Year	Title	Language	Notes
2008	Drona	Hindi	
2001	Bas Itna Sa Khwaab Hai	Hindi	

=== Television producer ===
Year	Title	Director	Producer	Network	Notes
2012	Kehta Hai Dil Jee Le Zara	No	Yes	Sony TV	co-producer along with his sister Shrishti Arya
2015	Reporters	Yes	Yes	Sony TV	co-producer along with his sister Shrishti Arya
2017	Aarambh	Yes	Yes	Star Plus	co-producer along with his sister Shrishti Arya
2024–2026	Jaane Anjaane Hum Mile	No	Yes	Zee TV	co-producer along with his sister Shrishti Arya
2025–2026	Itti Si Khushi	No	Yes	Sab TV	co-producer along with his sister Shrishti Arya
2026	Juhi Mui	No	Yes	Colors TV	co-producer along with his sister Shrishti Arya

=== Web series ===
Year	Title	Director	Producer	Network	Notes
2018	Kehne Ko Beghar Hain	No	Yes	ALTBalaji and ZEE5	
2019	REJCTX	Yes	Yes	ZEE5	
2022	Duranga		Yes	ZEE5	

== See also ==
- List of Hindi film families
