= Sandhya Mridul =

Indian television and film actress (born 1975)

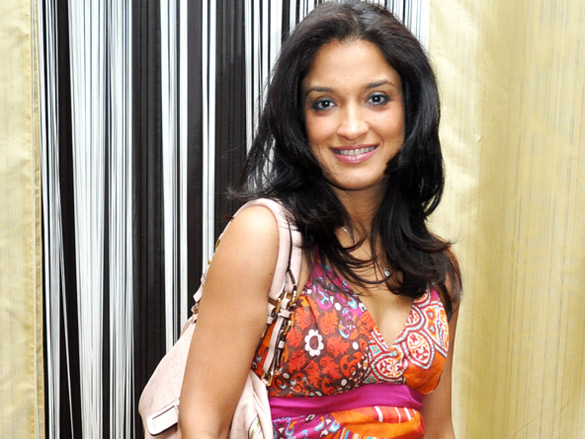
- Born: March 28, 1975; Bombay, Maharashtra, India
- Other name: Sandy
- Occupation: Actress
- Years active: 1993–present
- Height: 5 ft 5 in (1.65 m)
- Parents: P.R. Mridul (father); Aruna Mridul (mother)
- Relatives: Siddharth Mridul (brother)|Pankaj Mridul (brother) }}

Sandhya Mridul is an Indian actress who appears in Hindi films and television. She is most known for her roles in films like Saathiya (2002) and Page 3 (2005) and was first runner up on the reality dance show Jhalak Dikhhla Jaa (Season 2) (2007).

== Early life ==
Sandhya, also called 'Sandy', was born in Mumbai to P. R. Mridul and his wife Aruna Mridul. Later, the family moved to New Delhi. At age ten, she left home to attend school at Maharani Gayatri Devi Girls' Public School in Jaipur. She later attended Mater Dei Convent School in New Delhi. At age 14, her father, a lawyer and later a judge of the high court, died and she was brought up by her elder brother Siddharth Mridul who served as the Chief Justice of Manipur High Court and prior to that, as a Judge of Delhi High Court. She has another elder brother named Pankaj.

She attended Lady Sriram College, Delhi. She graduated in Mathematics, did her post graduation in marketing and went on to do a corporate job with KLM in Mumbai.

== Career ==
Mridul first arrived back in Mumbai to be a marketing executive. She first started her career with the popular TV serial Swabhimaan. After that, additional roles followed in serials like Banegi Apni Baat, Koshish and Hu Ba Hu.

She made her breakthrough in movies with Yash Raj Films, in Saathiya in 2002. It was critically and commercially successful and critics appreciated her performance. Her character Dina was an important supporting role that got her noticed.

She also appeared in Extraa Innings, the programme during the Cricket World Cup 2003.

In 2004, she acted in Pratap Sharma's Zen Katha, a play based on the life of Buddha in Mumbai opposite Rajeev Gopalkrishnan.

Mridul's show Koshish Ek Asha in which she played the role of the female protagonist has been dubbed in Chinese; in 2005, it was telecast in China. Through this show, Sandhya became a household name in China.

She decided to walk away from television soap operas because the roles felt repetitive. Of her decision, she remarked, "If you want to play the protagonist these days, you have to be the bahu. I'm not ready to do that again. I can't be wearing heavy saris with dark pink lipstick all my life."

In 2005 she starred in Page 3 with Konkona Sen Sharma and Tara Sharma. She played an air hostess. Her performance was again praised by the critics and the film was a hit at the box office.

Since 2006, she has focused exclusively on film roles. She played Maya, a restless soul who keeps on moving in and out of things in an off-beat film called Strings. She acted in 13th Floor, an interesting story of two people stuck in lift on the 13th floor. As a trained Bharatnatyam dancer, Sandhya's desire to show her dancing skills is being fulfilled in Chowki. In Honeymoon Travels Pvt. Ltd., she plays a wife stuck in a marriage with a gay man. In the thriller Deadline: Sirf 24 Ghante by Tanvir Khan, she acts with Irfan Khan. In The Great Indian Butterfly, she shows her talent in how a young Indian couple climbing the ladder of the corporate rat race.

Her versatility and her penchant for taking non-conformist roles have made her a darling of cross-over films. She proved her talent again in another off-beat film called Via Darjeeling in which she plays an alcoholic. "I would like to step into the shoes that Smita Patil left behind", says Mridul about where she sees herself in the Bollywood acting space.

She was judged the runner-up at the popular dance show Jhalak Dikhhla Jaa (Season 2). This decision did court some controversy since judge Urmila Matondkar declared that Mridul should have won. There were allegations of rigging and interference on the decision to declare Prachi Desai the winner of the show. Mridul said of the decision, "Don't tell me that I lost. Like I have said before, you lose only when you lose heart, and I haven't. I may have only lost out on a trophy and cash but I have won many hearts."

In 2008, she served as a member of the jury in the 14th Television Festival held in Shanghai. She was youngest and lone Indian in the festival. In 2014, Sandhya worked in Ragini MMS 2, in which she kissed Sunny Leone.

In 2016, she is portraying the role of Nazneen Khan in POW Bandhi Yudh Ki, mother of two children who single-handedly brings them up while her husband Imaan Khan (played by Satyadeep Misra) is missing in action since the Kargil War.

== Filmography ==
=== Television ===
Year	Show	Role	Notes
1994	Banegi Apni Baat	Sakshi	
1995	Swabhimaan	Shivani	
1997	Jeene Bhi Do Yaaro		
1998	Aashirwad	Geeta	
1999	Muskaan	Kashish	
2000	Koshish – Ek Aashaa	Kajal Khanna	
2002	Hubahu	Aditi and Ananya	
2004	Jassi Jaissi Koi Nahin	Yana	
2007	Jhalak Dikhhla Jaa (Season 2)	Herself	
2008	Ustaadon Ka Ustaad	Herself	
2016	P.O.W. - Bandi Yuddh Ke	Nazneen Khan	

=== Films ===
Year	Film	Role	Notes
1997	Hamen Jahan Pyar Mile		
2002	Saathiya	Dina Sharma	
2003	Waisa Bhi Hota Hai Part II	Inspector Agni Sinha	
2004	Uuf Kya Jaadoo Mohabbat Hai	Sangeeta Chaudhry	
2005	Page 3	Pearl Sequiera	
2005	Socha Na Tha	Sonal	
2005	Kuchh Meetha Ho Jaye	Rachna Singh	
2006	13th Floor	Naina	
2006	Deadline: Sirf 24 Ghante	Roohi K. Vaidya	
2007	Honeymoon Travels Pvt. Ltd.	Madhu	
2007	Say Salaam India	Sonali	
2008	Mr. Black Mr. White	Teenie	
2008	Via Darjeeling	Mallika Tiwari	
2009	Quick Gun Murugun	Masala News Reporter	
2010	The Great Indian Butterfly	Meera K. Kumar	
2010	Hum Tum Aur Ghost	Mini	
2011	Force	Swati	
2013	That Day After Every Day	Didi	Short film
2014	Ragini MMS 2	Monali	
2015	Angry Indian Goddesses	Suranjana	
2019	Section 375	Shilpa Saluja	
2019	Nirvana Inn	Leela	
2026	Parasakthi	Indira Gandhi	Tamil film

=== Web series ===
Year	Show	Role	Notes
2020	Mentalhood	Anuja Joshi/Ajo	Web series on ZEE5 & ALT Balaji
2021	Tandav	Professor Sandhya Nigam	Web series on Amazon Prime
2023	Taj: Divided by Blood	Jodha Bai	Web series on ZEE5

== Awards and nominations ==
Year	Award	Category	Film	Result
2006	BFJA Awards	Best Supporting Actress (Hindi)	Page 3	Won
2006	Filmfare Awards	Best Supporting Actress	Page 3	Nominated
