= Kill Dill =

2025 Indian television series

- Promotional release poster
- Genre: Romance; Drama
- Based on: The Heartbreak Club: One Girl Vs One Twisted Legacy (2024)
- Directed by: Glen Barretto; Ankush Mohla
- Starring: Prit Kamani; Anushka Sen
- Music by: Shaan
- Country of origin: India
- Original language: Hindi
- No. of episodes: 10

Production
- Producer: Deepak Dhar
- Camera setup: Multi-camera
- Running time: 25–38 mins
- Production company: Endemol India

Original release
- Network: Amazon MX Player
- Release: 28 March 2025

Kill Dill – The Heartbreak Club (transl. Kill Heart) is a 2025 Indian Hindi-language romance drama television series that premiered on 28 March 2025 on Amazon MX Player. Produced under Endemol India, it stars Prit Kamani and Anushka Sen.

== Cast ==
- Prit Kamani as Tavish
- Anushka Sen as Kisha
- Priyamvada Kant as Anara
- Sonyaa Ayoddhya as Vedika
- Chetan Dhawan
- Sonya Saamoor
- Nihal Shaikh
- Siffat Gandhi
- Kiara Khantwal
- Aashish Kaul
- Barsha Chatterjee
- Aditya Raghuvanshi
- Aditii Saraf

== Production ==
The series was announced on Endemol Shine India. It is based on Novoneel Chakraborty's The Heartbreak Club: One Girl Vs One Twisted Legacy (2024). The trailer of the series was released on 25 March 2025.

== Music ==
Kill Dill

Soundtrack album by Shaan
- Released: 29 March 2025
- Genre: Soundtrack
- Length: 6:16
- Language: Hindi
- Label: Amazon MX Player
External audio
- "Meri Zindagi" playlist on YouTube
- "Adhoorey" playlist on YouTube

The music for Kill Dill is composed by Shaan.

All lyrics are written by Kunwar Juneja.

Track listing
| No. | Title | Singer(s) | Length |
|---|---|---|---|
| 1. | "Adhoorey" | Shaan, Arpita Chakravarty | 3:06 |
| 2. | "Adhoorey" (Cast Version) | Prit Kamani, Anushka Sen | 3:06 |
| 3. | "Meri Zindagi" | Shaan | 3:10 |
| 4. | "Meri Zindagi" (Cast Version) | Prit Kamani | 3:10 |
| Total length: | | | 12:32 |

== Release ==
The series was made available to stream on Amazon MX Player on 28 March 2025.

== Reception ==
Archika Khurana of The Times of India rated the series two-and-a-half out of five stars.
