= Devika Bhagat =

Indian screenwriter

Devika Bhagat (born 25 October 1979) is an Indian screenwriter works in Hindi-language films, who has written films like Manorama Six Feet Under (2007, Bachna Ae Haseeno (2008) and Ladies vs Ricky Bahl (2011).

== Early life and education ==
She was born in New Delhi, India.

She is an alumna of Convent of Jesus and Mary school in Delhi and United World College of the Atlantic in Wales UK. She has a BFA degree in Film and Television Production from Tisch School of the Arts, New York University class of 2002.

== Career ==
In the film industry, her first job was that of a post-production intern for Monsoon Wedding (2001)

== Filmography ==
Year	Film	Director	Writer
2002	Dreaming Lhasa	Assistant	No
2004	The Bourne Supremacy	Assistant	No
2005	In Othello	Assistant	No
2007	Manorama Six Feet Under	No	Screenplay
2008	Bachna Ae Haseeno	No	Screenplay
2010	Aisha	No	Yes
2011	Ladies vs Ricky Bahl	No	Screenplay
2012	Jab Tak Hai Jaan	No	Screenplay
2012	I, Me aur Main	No	Yes
2014	One by Two	Yes	Yes
2020	Unpaused	No	Yes

== Television ==
Year	Title	Credited as	Channel
2010	Mahi Way	Screenwriter	Sony TV
2018	Four More Shots Please!	Co-writer	Amazon Video
