= Avneet Kaur =

Indian actress (born 2001)

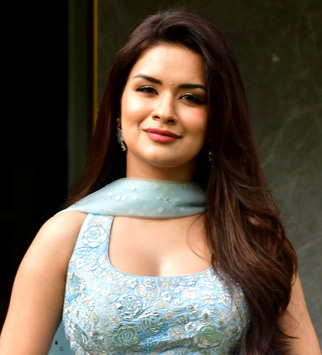
- Kaur in 2025
- Born: 13 October 2001 (age 25); Jalandhar, Punjab, India
- Occupations: Actress; dancer
- Years active: 2010–present
- Known for: Dance India Dance Li'l Masters; Chandra Nandini; Aladdin – Naam Toh Suna Hoga

Avneet Kaur (born 13 October 2001) is an Indian actress who works in Hindi television and films. Kaur is well-known for her work in Dance India Dance Li'l Masters, Jhalak Dikhhla Jaa 5, Mardaani, Chandra Nandini, Aladdin – Naam Toh Suna Hoga, and Tiku Weds Sheru.

== Early life ==
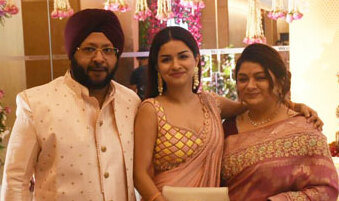
Kaur with parents Amandeep Singh Nandra and Sonia Nandra in 2022

Kaur was born in a Sikh family to Sonia Nandra and Amandeep Singh Nandra on 13 October 2001 in Jalandhar, Punjab, and later moved to Mumbai. Kaur has one younger brother, Jaijeet Singh. She began her performing career in 2010 at the age of 8. Kaur pursued a degree in commerce from a private college in Kandivali, Mumbai.

== Career ==
Kaur began her career in 2010 with Zee TV's dance show Dance India Dance Li'l Masters. She was eliminated before the semi-finals. Later, she participated in Dance Ke Superstars, joining the team of "Dance Challengers".

Her acting debut came in 2012 with Life OK's Meri Maa where she portrayed Jhilmil. Following this, she appeared in SAB TV's Tedhe Hain Par Tere Mere Hain. In the same year, Kaur took part in Colors TV's celebrity dance reality show Jhalak Dikhhla Jaa, paired with Darsheel Safary, becoming the youngest contestant on the show.

In 2013, Kaur featured in Life OK's Savitri – Ek Prem Kahani, essaying the role of Rajkumari Damayanti. Subsequently, she portrayed Pakhi in Zee TV's Ek Mutthi Aasmaan, and also appeared in ZeeQ's news bulletin titled The Weekly Rap.

Her film career commenced in 2014 with Pradeep Sarkar's Mardaani. In September 2014, she played Khushi in Sony Pal's Hamari Sister Didi.

In 2016, she starred in the short film titled Dost, released on YouTube under the banner of Jigsaw Pictures. In 2017, she played Rajkumari Charumati in Chandra Nandini. From 2018 to 2020, she portrayed Sultana Yasmine in SAB TV's Aladdin – Naam Toh Suna Hoga, departing from the show in mid-2020 due to health issues.

In June 2023, Kaur appeared in Manish Tiwary's Chidiakhana alongside Ritvik Sahore, and starred in Kangana Ranaut's Tiku Weds Sheru opposite Nawazuddin Siddiqui on Amazon Prime Video. In June 2024, she featured in Luv Ki Arrange Marriage opposite Sunny Singh. In December 2024, Kaur starred in Amazon-MX Player's murder mystery Party Till I Die alongside Vishal Jethwa.

Kaur's next film, Love in Vietnam, was announced at the 2024 Cannes Film Festival, and released in September 2025. Directed by Rahhat Shah Kazmi and produced by Omung Kumar, it co-stars Shantanu Maheshwari and Vietnamese actress Kha Ngan. The film marks the first India-Vietnam collaboration and is based on the bestselling novel Madonna in a Fur Coat.

== Filmography ==
=== Films ===
Key
†	Denotes films that have not yet been released

Year	Title	Role	Notes	Ref.
2014	Mardaani	Meera		
2016	Dost	Pia	Short film	
2017	Qarib Qarib Singlle	Teenage girl		
2018	Brunie	Shivani		
2019	Ekta	Young Ekta		
2019	Mardaani 2	Meera		
2023	Chidiakhana	Mili		
2023	Tiku Weds Sheru	Tasleem "Tiku" Khan		
2024	Luv Ki Arrange Marriage	Ishika		
2025	Love in Vietnam	Simmi	Hindi-Vietnamese bilingual film	
2026	Gunmaaster G9 †	TBA		

=== Television ===
Year	Title	Role	Notes	Ref.
2010	Dance India Dance Li'l Masters	Contestant	7th place	
2011	Dance Ke Superstars	Contestant		
2011–2012	Meri Maa	Jhilmil		
2012	Jhalak Dikhhla Jaa 5	Choreographer	7th place	
2012	Tedhe Hain Par Tere Mere Hain	Unknown		
2013	Savitri – Ek Prem Kahani	Young Rajkumari Damayanti		
2013	Ek Mutthi Aasmaan	Young Pakhi Kapoor		
2013	ZeeQ's Weekly Rap	Herself		
2013	Shake It Up	Tashi Prema	Guest appearance	
2014–2015	Hamari Sister Didi	Khushi Kapoor		
2015	Lage Raho Chachu	Herself	Guest appearance	
2015	Twistwala Love	Raina Mehra		
2016	Crime Patrol Satark	Kajal	Episode 628	
2017	Chandra Nandini	Rajkumari Charumati		
2018–2020	Aladdin – Naam Toh Suna Hoga	Sultana Yasmine	2 seasons	
2019	Kitchen Champion	Herself	Episode 53	
2020	Kuch Smiles Ho Jayein... With Alia	Herself	Episode 1	

=== Web series ===
Year	Title	Role	Notes	Ref.
2018	Babbar Ka Tabbar	Nikki Babbar	2 seasons	
2020	Bandish Bandits	Student	Song: "Chedkhaniyaan"	
2024	Party Till I Die	Devangana "Devi" Suri		

=== Music video appearances ===
Year	Title	Singer(s)	Ref.
2013	"Labdiyaan"	Malaa Treon	
2019	"Tarse Ye Naina"	Anand Bajpai	
2019	"Yaari"	Nikk	
2019	"Pahadan"	Rajat Nagpal	
2019	"Mere Naina"	Karan Singh Arora	
2019	"Attachment"	Ravneet Singh	
2019	"Teri Naar"	Nikk	
2019	"Main Fir Nai Auna"	Nick Nannu	
2019	"Taanashah"	Jagmeet Brar	
2019	"Kaali Meri Gaddi"	Ramji Gulati	
2020	"Daily Daily"	Neha Kakkar	
2020	"Luck Di Kasam"	Ramji Gulati, Mack	
2020	"Humara Hindustan"	Sunil Kapoor	
2020	"Saara Din"	Karan Singh Arora, Herself	
2020	"Chocolate"	Tony Kakkar	
2020	"Badaami Rang"	Nikk	
2020	"Ex Calling"	Neha Kakkar, Rohanpreet Singh	
2021	"Faraar"	Akull	
2021	"Tera Hoon Na"	Nikhil D'Souza	
2021	"Tenu Ni Pata"	Guri	
2021	"Kinne Saalan Baad"	Goldie Sohel	
2021	"Dekhe Saare Khwaab"	Ishaan Khan	
2021	"Paagla"	Akhil	
2021	"Hone Laga Tumse Pyaar"	Abhi Dutt	
2022	"Kesariyo Rang"	Asees Kaur, Dev Negi	
2026	"Mahiya"	Shreya Ghosal, Badshah	

== Awards and nominations ==
Year	Award	Category	Work	Result	Ref.
2019	Gold Awards	Debut in a Lead Role (Female)	Aladdin – Naam Toh Suna Hoga	Won	
2019	Gold Awards	Best Onscreen Jodi (With Siddharth Nigam)	Aladdin – Naam Toh Suna Hoga	Nominated	
2020	Gold Glam and Style Awards	Stylish Influencer (Female)	—N/a	Won	
2024	Bollywood Hungama Style Icons	Most Stylish Digital Star of the Year	—N/a	Nominated	

== See also ==
- List of Indian film actresses
- List of Hindi film actresses
- List of Indian television actresses
- List of Hindi television actresses
