= Gayatri Bhardwaj =

Indian actress, model and beauty pageant titleholder (born 1995)

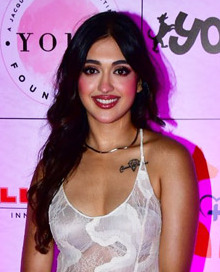
- Bhardwaj in 2023
- Born: 17 June 1995 (age 31); New Delhi, India
- Occupations: Actress; Model; Beauty pageant Title holder
- Height: 1.68 m (5 ft 6 in)
- Beauty pageant titleholder
- Title: Femina Miss India United Continents 2018
- Hair colour: Brown
- Eye colour: Brown
- Major competitions: Femina Miss India Delhi 2018 (Winner); Femina Miss India 2018 (Top 5); Miss United Continents 2018 (Top 10)

Gayatri Bhardwaj (born 17 June 1995) is an Indian actress, model and beauty pageant title holder who predominantly works in Hindi and Telugu films. She represented the state of New Delhi at the Femina Miss India 2018 pageant, where she was crowned Femina Miss India Miss United Continents 2018 and represented India at Miss United Continents pageant. In 2021, she acted in an Indian YouTube comedy web-series named Dhindora which marked her acting debut.

== Early life ==
Gayatri Bhardwaj was born on 17 June 1995 in Delhi, India. She did her primary education from Modern School. She began her modelling career with Campus Princess 2018, while pursuing her graduation in Dentistry from Bharati Vidyapeeth Dental College, Pune. Later, she participated in Femina Miss India Delhi 2018 and Femina Miss India 2018. She is a bharatanatyam dancer and played football.

== Career ==
In 2018, she was chosen as the female lead for Telugu romantic drama Romantic starring alongside Akash Puri. The makers were looking for a fresh face alongside the male lead and they chose Bhardwaj because of her modelling career and her being comfortable in front of a camera. Later, she was replaced with Ketika Sharma.

In 2021, Bharadwaj made her acting debut with Dhindora portraying Dr. Tara Rumpum opposite Bhuvan Bam. Her name in the web series is a word play on the 2007 Hindi film titled Ta Ra Rum Pum.

In 2022, Bhardwaj also made her Hindi film debut with Laxman Utekar's Ittu Si Baat, which co-starred Bhupendra Jadawat and featured her as Sapna.

Bhardwaj next paired opposite Ritvik Sahore in Ishq Express as Tanya and in Highway Love as Inaya.

She appeared in the Telugu film Tiger Nageswara Rao opposite Ravi Teja and Nupur Sanon thereby making her Tollywood debut. She played the role of Mani who is Tiger's wife. In an interview on 17 October, she revealed that the director Vamsee had seen her performance in Dhindora and according to him, right from when he saw her first scene in the series, she matched the description of Mani's image he had in mind and after he met her to discuss about her role in the film, she was selected for it. The film released on 20 October 2023 and it was a box-office success but received mixed reviews.

In 2024, she acted in another Telugu film named Buddy where she was paired opposite Allu Sirish. The film is a remake of a Tamil film Teddy. The film released on 2 August and it received mixed reviews. She also acted in a Hindi-language web series called Mohrey where she plays a lawyer named Rachel Pinto. The web series was released on MX Player and Prime Video on 6 December.

== Media ==
Bharadwaj was ranked 5th in Times of India's 50 Most Desirable Women 2018.

== Filmography ==
=== Films ===
Key
†	Denotes films that have not yet been released

Year	Title	Role	Language	Notes	Ref.
2022	Ittu Si Baat	Sapna Mathur	Hindi	Hindi debut	
2023	Tiger Nageswara Rao	Mani	Telugu	Telugu debut	
2024	Buddy	Pallavi	Telugu		
2026	Cult	Maya	Telugu		
2027	Karikaala: Chapter 1 †	TBA	Telugu	Filming	

=== Web series ===
Year	Title	Role	Ref.
2021	Dhindora	Dr. Tara Rumpum	
2022	Ishq Express	Tanya	
2023–2024	Highway Love	Inaya	
2024	Mohrey	Rachel Pinto	

=== Music videos ===
Year	Title	Singer(s)	Ref.
2019	Call	D Soldierz	
2019	Level	D Soldierz	
2019	Patola	Brijesh Shandilya	
2023	Jawaab	Badshah	

== Awards and nominations ==
Year	Award	Category	Work	Result	Ref.
2023	South Indian International Movie Awards	Best Debut Actress	Tiger Nageswara Rao	Nominated	

== See also ==
- List of Indian television actresses
- List of Hindi television actresses

Awards and achievements
Preceded by (India); Sana Dua	Miss United Continents India; 2018	Succeeded by (India); Shreya Shanker
