= Anamika =

Anamika may refer to:

== People ==
- Anamika (poet) (born 1961), Indian poet and novelist
- Anamika Khanna (born 1977), fashion designer based in Kolkata, India
- Anamika Saha, Indian actress
- Anamika Choudhari, Indian singer

== Television and film ==
- Anamika (1973 film), a 1973 Hindi film
- Anamika (2008 film), a Bollywood film
- Anaamika, a 2014 Telugu and Tamil film
- Anamika (2012 TV series), a Hindi language television series on Sony Entertainment Television India and Sony Entertainment Television Asia
- Anamika (2022 TV series), Hindi language web series on MX Player
- Anamika (album), a 1992 Assamese music album by Zubeen Garg
- Anamika (2024 TV series), Indian Tamil language TV series on Sun TV.

== Other uses ==
- Anamika (fungus), a genus of fungus in the family Cortinariaceae
- Anamika (newsletter), a newsletter for South Asian lesbians and queer women
