= Chidiakhana =

- Directed by: Manish Tiwary
- Written by: Manish Tiwary
- Produced by: National Film Development Corporation of India
- Starring: Ritvik Sahore; Avneet Kaur; Prashant Narayanan; Ravi Kishan
- Cinematography: Sriram Ganapathy
- Edited by: Irene Dhar Malik; Manish Tiwary
- Music by: Viveick Rajagopalan
- Lyrics by: Anil Pandey
- Distributed by: Platoon One
- Release date: 2 June 2023
- Running time: 155 minutes
- Country: India
- Language: Hindi

Chidiakhana (English: Zoo) is a 2023 Indian Hindi-language coming-of-age sports drama film written and directed by Manish Tiwary. about a Bihari boy who is accepted in a Mumbai Chawl thanks to his wit, determination and football skills.

== Synopsis ==
Sooraj Ritvik Sahore and his mother Rajeshwari Sachdev arrive in a Mumbai chawl. Sooraj struggles to play his game and find tranquilly due to school gangs. Sooraj fights for his place in this Chidiakhana. When a local chawl strongman Prashant Narayanan rescues him, his modest expectations soar. Our underdog's luck changes. Chidiakhana, Manish Tiwary's third film after Dil Dosti Etc and Issaq, is about an underdog overcoming obstacles with passion, resilience and persistence.

== Cast ==
- Ritvik Sahore as Sooraj
- Avneet Kaur as Mili
- Prashant Narayanan as Pratap
- Rajeshwari Sachdev as Bibha
- Ravi Kishan as BIKRAM Pandey
- Aanjjan Srivastav as School principal
- Govind Namdev as Politician
- Nagesh Bhosle as BMC Mayor
- Ajay Jadhav as School Teacher

== Soundtrack ==
Chidiakhana

Soundtrack album by Viveick Rajagopalan
- Released: 25 May 2023
- Genre: Feature film soundtrack
- Length: 13:00
- Language: Hindi
- Label: Zee Music Company
- Producer: NFDC

The music was composed by Viveick Rajagopalan & Hruday Satam, with lyrics by Anil Pandey & Hruday Satam. the music label is on Zee Music Company.

#	Title	Singer(s)
1	"Zindagi Chalti Hai"	Rajiv Sundaresan
2	"So Ja re Babua (Lori)"	Smita Jain
3	" Le Balaiya"	Pravesh Mallick
4	"Chidiakhana (Remix Rap Song)"	Hruday Satam

== Reception ==
Shubhra Gupta of The Indian Express rated the film 1.5 out of 5 stars, and wrote, "There’s a pleasing sincerity about Ritvik Sahore, and Rajeshwari Sachdev and Prashant Narayanan are both capable of breathing life into a scene. But with so little lift from the writing, they all come off cliched."

Archika Khurana of The Times of India rated the film 2 out of 5 stars and concluded, "The tone of this 114-minute film is lighthearted, and the dialogues are pedestrian but funny in parts."
