= Jamnapaar =

2024 Indian TV series

- Genre: Drama
- Created by: Gaurav Arora
- Written by: Gaurav Arora; Jasmeet Singh Bhatia
- Screenplay by: Gaurav Arora; Jasmeet Singh Bhatia
- Directed by: Prashant Bhagia
- Starring: Ritvik Sahore; Srishti Ganguly; Raghu Ram; Varun Badola
- Country of origin: India
- Original language: Hindi
- No. of seasons: 2
- No. of episodes: 20

Production
- Executive producers: Gaurav Arora; Dhananjay Muley; Naveen Shetty
- Producers: Seema Sawhney Sharma; Sudhir Sharma
- Production location: India
- Cinematography: Hanoz Kerawala
- Editors: Prashant Kajale; Sundiip Singh
- Running time: 30 mins

Original release
- Network: Amazon MX Player
- Release: 24 May 2024

Jamnapaar is an Indian Hindi-language drama television series directed by Prashant Bhagia. The series features Ritvik Sahore, Srishti Ganguly and Raghu Ram in the lead role. The first season premiered on Amazon miniTV on 24 May 2024.

The second season was released on 10 October 2025.

== Cast ==
- Ritvik Sahore as Shanky Bansal
- Srishti Ganguly Rindani as Sara
- Raghu Ram as Rajat Thapar
- Anubha Fatehpura as Pushpa Bansal
- Varun Badola as K D Bansal
- Ankita Sahigal as Shailja
- Inder Sahani as Paras Jiju
- Tanvi Gadkari as Khyati Rana
- Anushka Kaushik as Princy
- Vijay Raaz as Shaukeen Bhaiya

== Episodes ==
Series	Episodes	Originally released
1	10	24 May 2024
2	10	10 October 2025

== Music ==
Tracklist
No.	Title	Length
1.	"Dariya"
2.	"Mera Ghar JamnaPaar"

== Reception ==
Abhishek Srivastava of Times of India gave it a rating of 3 out of 5 saying that, The Trans-Yamuna milieu is perfectly captured by the show's creators, which reflects in both the dialect and mannerisms. Sonal Pandya from Times Now gave it a rating 3 out of 5 saying that "Jamnapaar has a shaky intro as it tries to lean into humour a bit with the series narrator being the Metro. The show works much better as it focuses on Shanky and his desire to make something of himself."
