= Aakash Dabhade =

Indian actor

- Born: 8 March 1985 (age 41); Nagpur, Maharashtra India
- Education: Ramnarain Ruia College
- Occupation: Actor
- Years active: 2009–present

Aakash Dabhade (born 8 March 1985, in Nagpur, Maharashtra, India) is an Indian actor working in the Indian film industry. He is known as a versatile actor with great comic timing, expressions and dancing skills. He gained popularity for his portrayal of 'Mohan' in the movie Ferrari Ki Sawaari produced by Vidhu Vinod Chopra and directed by Rajesh Mhapuskar. He came to the limelight for his movie Boss with Akshay Kumar. The Hindi film Stree gave him the recognition as a very good expressive dancer. Critically acclaimed Film Article 15 (film) starring Ayushmann Khurrana and Directed By Anubhav Sinha gave him recognition as an Intense actor. His TV commercials with actors Imran Khan, Irrfan Khan, and Vidya Balan, in addition to brands such as Car Dekho, Nokia, Pidilite LW plus, and Bingo wafers became very popular.

== Filmography ==
Key
†	Denotes films that have not yet been released

Year	Film	Role	Note
2009	3 idiots	Engineering student	directed by Rajkumar Hirani
2012	Ferrari Ki Sawaari	Mohan	produced by Vidhu Vinod Chopra
2013	Boss	Vishal Pradhan	
2015	Bangistan	Sanichara	directed by Karan Anshuman
2016	7 Hours to Go	Inspector Ghorpade	directed by Saurabh Varma
2016	Shivaay	Indian Trekker	directed by Ajay Devgn
2018	Baa Baaa Black Sheep	Fixer	distributed by T-Series
2018	Stree	Narendra	with Rajkumar Rao
2019	Article 15	Satyendra	directed by Anubhav Sinha
2020	Babloo Bachelor†	Chhotte	
2020	Kya Masti Kya Dhoom†	Dara	directed by Chandrakant Singh
2019	Housefull 4	Harry's Friend	
2019	Penalty	Jugaadu aka Chandan	
2020	Shukranu	Bhaanu	on Zee5
2020	Mastram	Gopal	MX Player Web series
2020	Lootcase	Graduate	Disney+ Hotstar film
2022	The Great Weddings of Munnes	Suresh	web series on Voot
2024	Ghudchadi	Mayank	JioCinema film
