= Sanam (band) =

I-pop (Indian classical music in pop style)

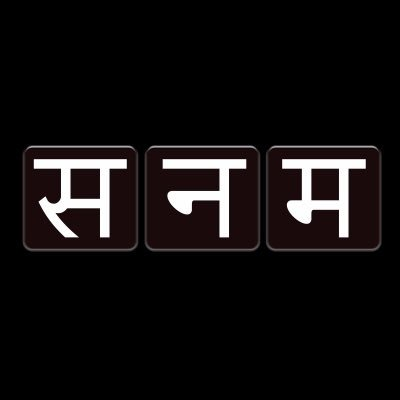
- Sanam's Hindi logo

Background information
- Origin: Mumbai, India
- Genre: Pop rock
- Years active: 2010–present
- Labels: Times Music; Sony Music; T-Series; Saregama; Zee Music Company
- Members: Sanam Puri; Samar Puri; Venky S (Venkat Subramaniyam); Keshav Dhanraj; Rudrani borekar (indira uni)

Sanam is an Indian pop rock band formed in 2010 currently based in Mumbai, India known for its renditions of old classic Indian Bollywood songs as well as its original music. The band SANAM consists of Sanam Puri (lead vocalist), Samar Puri (lead guitarist), Venky S or Venkat Subramaniyam (bass guitarist) and Keshav Dhanraj (drummer). In 2016, the band was amongst India's top 10 independent YouTube Channels, India's biggest music artist on the digital platform and the fastest growing YouTube channel in the country.

The band was awarded the Best Music Content Creator (National Category) at the Social Media Summit & Awards in Amaravati in 2017 by AP Tourism Minister Bhuma Akhila Priya and MP Kesineni Srinivas.

== Musical career ==
=== 2010: Formation and first years ===
In 2003, Venky and Samar were classmates in Indian School, Muscat, both of them played guitar and planned to start a band so they got Samar's younger brother, Sanam Puri, in the band to join as a singer. After completing school, they all moved to India for college. Sanam and Samar moved to Delhi and there became involved in the college rock circuits. Sanam Puri started winning awards for his singing and Samar Puri started writing songs. Venky meanwhile, in Bangalore, took up bass playing with various bands. He sang a cappella in college and started performing swing/jazz and pop standards regularly at clubs. Venky met Keshav (who was the drummer in bands such as Nerverek) through the college rock circuit and they formed an alternative rock outfit called ‘The Previous Band’. Venky used to travel to Chennai (where the band was based) to write songs, rehearse and perform with them. Eventually two band members took left for Musicians Institute in Los Angeles for music education and another member went to SAE in Byron Bay. Thus ended their short stint of ‘The Previous Band’. In 2009, Samar and Sanam moved to Mumbai to pursue a music career. Keshav also took up a job with Furtados as their Brand Manager for Zildjian, Evans and Pearl drums. Venky connected the three of them and they started writing music together. In May 2010, Times Music launched a nationwide pop band hunt called ‘Supastars’ for young talent in India. Samar, Keshav and Sanam put in an entry randomly in the name of The SQS Project. Over 1,600 bands across India took part in this contest. Venky joined them in the final round and of all the entries The SQS Project won the title ‘Times Music Supastars’, giving the band a name of ‘SQS Supastars’.

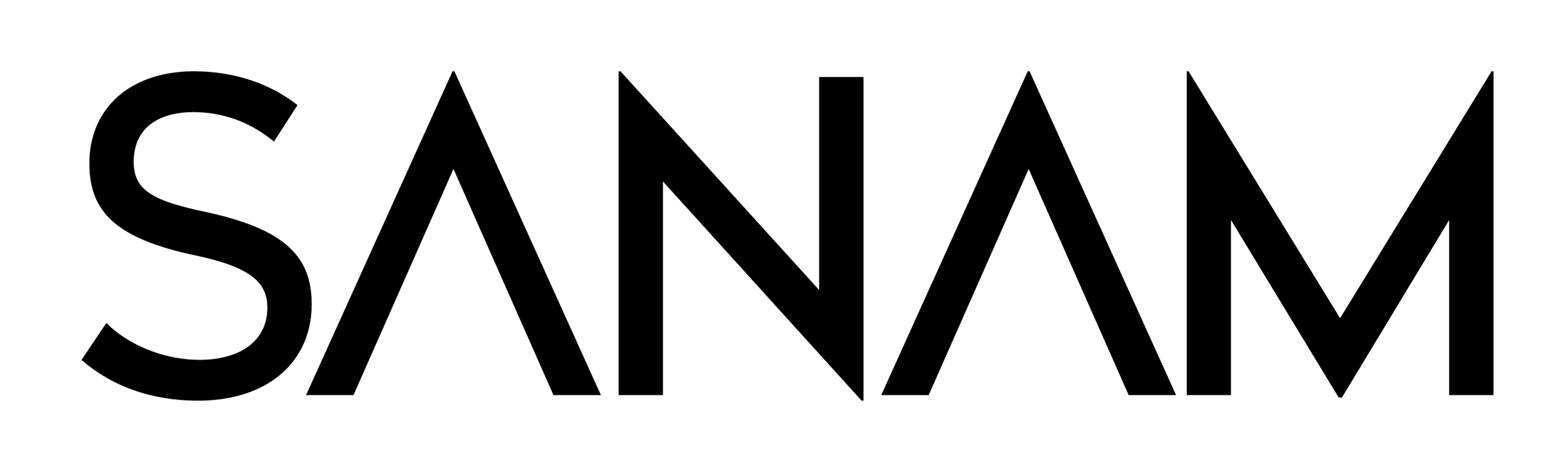
Band SANAM's Official LOGO (English)

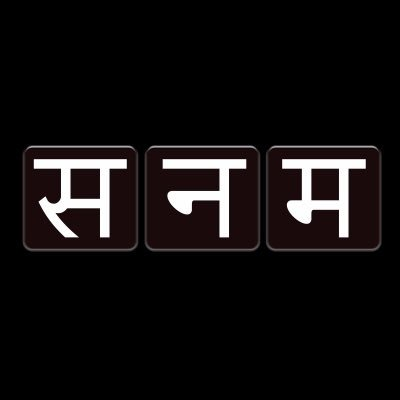
Band SANAM's Official LOGO (Hindi)

The band released their first self-titled album, Supastars, and later released music videos for their songs "Hawa Hawa" and "Behka". Major Swedish and Denmark music labels handled the mixing and mastering of the album. The band also endorsed the ‘Mufti’ clothing line during their second music video "Behka".

=== 2012: Formation of Sanam - the band and Growth Curve ===
In 2012 the band met Ben Thomas (managing director of Kurian & Co Talent Management and a music business manager who had managed music artists including Sonu Nigam and Vishal–Shekhar). He also introduced the band to Vishal–Shekhar which led to Sanam Puri's first Bollywood break as a playback singer with songs like "Dhat Teri Ki" from the movie Gori Tere Pyaar Mein and "Ishq Bulaava" from Hasee Toh Phasee. The same year the band composed its first original composition "Main Hoon" for the Hollywood blockbuster The Amazing Spider-Man 2.

Given the growing following of the band digitally, in 2015 the band was invited by YouTube to perform at the YouTube FanFest. They were again invited in 2016.

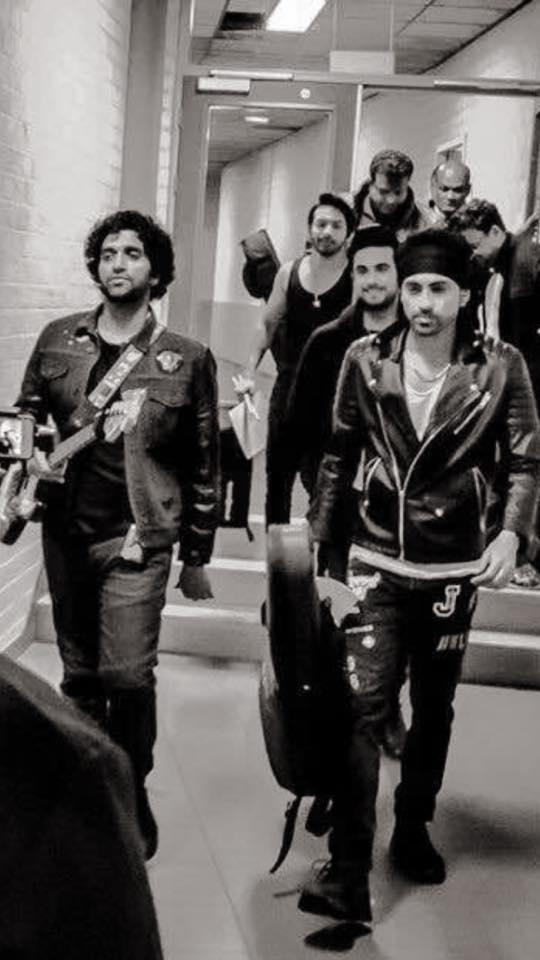
Band SANAM on the way from the green room to the stage for the SANAM Live in Concert @ Holland during Holland-Suriname-Trinidad 2017 Tour

The band performed in the capital Male at the VMY Music Festival in July 2015, which commemorated the 50th Anniversary of Independence of the Republic of Maldives. The Ballard Estate Festival in Mumbai was formally inaugurated by the chief guest Nitin Gadkari, Minister of Road Transport and Highways of India on 24 January, followed by the headlining performance by the band Sanam. The event was attended by personalities such as actress and politician Hema Malini.

In 2016 as a part of a project called Jammin, a digital musical collaboration featuring YouTube's musical talent with four music composers A R Rahman, Salim–Sulaiman, Clinton Cerejo, and Mithoon, "Inquilab Mera Khwab" was released in collaboration with Clinton Cerejo and "Yaara" was released in collaboration with A R Rahman and all other artists who were a part of the programme.

On 1 April 2017, music broadcaster Channel V announced the launch of its project ‘Only On V’, with an exclusive partnership with the band Sanam. In 2017 the band played a series of concerts as a part of the Pledge Tour to raise awareness of the growing number of cases of sexual child abuse in India, in association with a Chennai-based NGO Justice & Hope.

In February 2018, Sanam was declared the artist of the month on MTV Beats for their release "Sanam Mennu". The band was featured in three shows. In December 2018, SANAM band was featured on the cover of Rolling Stone Magazine.

== Discography ==
=== Filmography ===
Release year	Album title	Song title	Label	Writer	Composer	Language
2014	The Amazing Spider-Man 2	"Main Hoon"	Sony Music	Samar Puri, Manoj Yadav	Sanam Band	Hindi

=== Studio albums ===
Release year	Album title	Song title	Language
2010	Supastars	Hawa Hawa, Jaan Gaya, Aisa Laga, Behka, Tumse, Teri Aankhon Se, Hawa Hawa, Boondon Se	Hindi
2011	Samar Sanam	On N On, Paa Hi Liya, Roshni, Higher Mere Saath, Badalne Ke Intezaar Mein, Mujhe Pyaar Karo, Titli	Hindi
2018	Sanam Revolution	Itni Door, Garmi Di Tu, Ishtyle, Agar Tum Suno, Aaja Aaja, Jaanta Tha, Nazron Ko Nazron Se, Khushnaseeb, Shama Hai Jali, Tumi Robe Nirobe Rabindra Sangeet	Hindi, Bengali

=== Compilation albums ===
Release year	Album title	Song title	Language
2017	In Love With Sanam	Pehla Nasha, Kuch Na Kaho, Yeh Raatein Yeh Mausam, Kora Kagaz, Ek Ladki Ko dekha Toh, O Mere Dil Ke Chain, Roop Tera Mastana, Hai Apna Dil Toh Awara, Apki Nazron Ne Samjha, Lag Jaa Gale	Hindi
2015	Sanam Revisited	Lag Jaa Gale, Ek Ladki Ko Dekha Toh, Aapki Nazron Ne Samjha, Tujhse Naraz Nahi Zindagi, Yeh Raatein Yeh Mausam, Mere Sapno Ki Rani, O Mere Dil Ke Chain, Mere Mehboob Qayamat Hogi, Roop Tera Mastana, Yeh Vaada Raha	Hindi
2019	Universally Sanam	Jaane De Mujhe, Gulabi Aankhein, Hum Bewafa Hargiz Na The, Yeh Vaada Raha, Dil Kya Kare	Hindi
2020	Memories Vol. 1	Sanam Mennu, Itni Door, Nazaron Ko Nazaron Se, Garmi Di Tu, Dil Nachda, Jaanta Tha, Aaj Na Jaana, Tumi Robe Nirobe	Hindi, Punjabi, Bengali

Singles

Release year	Single Title	Language	Composer	Lyricist
2018	SANAM Mennu	Punjabi	Sanam	Siddhant Kaushal
2018	Amar Mallika Bone	Bengali	Rabindra Nath Tagore	Rabindra Nath Tagore
2018	Tu Yahaan	Hindi	Sanam	Siddhant Kaushal
2018	Dooba Dooba	Hindi	Silk Route	Mohit Chauhan; Kem Trivedi; Atul Mittal; Kenny Puri Chris Powell Shantanu Moitra
2018	Ek Pyar Ka Nagma	Hindi	Laxmikant Pyarelal	Santosh Anand
2019	Kahin Door	Hindi	Salil Choudhury	Yogesh Gaur
2019	Humein Tumse Pyaar Kitna	Hindi	R D Burman	Majrooh Sultanpuri
2019	Chala Jata Hoon	Hindi	R D Burman	Majrooh Sultanpuri
2019	Taarif Karoon	Hindi	O.P Nayyar	S. H. Bihari
2019	Fakira	Hindi	Vishal–Shekhar	Anvita Dutt
2019	Jaane De Mujhe	Hindi	Sanam	Kunaal Vermaa
2025	Badan Pe Sitate	Hindi	Shankar-Jaikishan	Hasrat Jaipuri
2026	Chura Liya Hai	Hindi	R. D. Burman	Majrooh Sultanpuri

== Sanam Puri's works ==
=== Filmography ===
Release year	Film title	Song title	Label	Lyricist	Composer	Language	Co-singers
2013	Gori Tere Pyaar Mein	"Dhat Teri Ki"	Sony Music	Kumaar	Vishal–Shekhar	Hindi	Aditi Singh Sharma
2013	Ishk Actually	"Lucky Tonight"	T Series	Manoj Yadav	Chirantan Bhatt	Hindi	Ann Mitchai
2014	Hasee Toh Phasee	"Ishq Bulava (film version)"	Sony Music	Kumaar	Vishal–Shekhar	Hindi	Chinmayi
2014	Hasee Toh Phasee	"Ishq Bulaava (soundtrack version)"	Sony Music	Kumaar	Vishal–Shekhar	Hindi	Shipra Goyal
2014	Chandamama Kathalu	"E Kadha"	-	Vanamali	Mickey J Meyer	Telugu	Shweta Pandit
2014	Humshakals	"Barbaad Raat"	Zee Music	Mayur Puri	Himesh Reshamiya	Hindi	Shalmali Kholgade
2017	Running Shaadi	"Bhaag Milky Bhaag"	Times Music	Keegan Pinto, Sonal Sehgal	Anupam Roy, Sanjeev Chimmalgi, Abhishek-Akshay, Zeb	Hindi	Sonu Kakkar
2019	Student of the Year 2	"Fakira"	Zee Music	Anvita Dutt	Vishal–Shekhar	Hindi	Neeti Mohan
Qued	Jajabor	"Priyotoma"	-	Faisal Roddy	Faisal Roddy	Bengali	-

=== Collaborations ===
Release year	Project title	Song title	Lyricist	Composer	Language	Co-singers
2013	Single Release	Teri Aankhon Se (Acoustic Version)	Samar Puri	SANAM (band)	Hindi	Jonita Gandhi
2013	Coke Studio @ MTV Season 3 Episode 3	Pinjra	Manoj Yadav	Clinton Cerejo	Hindi	Jonita Gandhi
2013	Micromax Unite Anthem	"Roobaroo"	Prasoon Joshi	A R Rahman	Various	Benny Dayal, Raghu Dixit, Apeksha Dandekar, Shruti Pathak, Neeti Mohan, Kamal Khan, Brodha V, Voctronica, Swaroop Khan
2014	Single Release	Dua (Cover)	Kumaar	Vishal - Shekhar	Hindi	Sanah Moidutty
2016	Jammin	Yaara	Navneeth	A R Rahman	Hindi	A.R. Rahman, Shraddha Sharma, Siddharth Slathia, Jonita Gandhi, Shirley Setia, Arjun Kanungo, Maati Baani ( Nirali Kartik & Kartik Shah), Sanah Moidutty, Raaga Trippin (Alan De Souza, Gary Misquitta, Gwen Dias, Keshia Braganza, Suzanne D'Mello and Thomson Andrews) and Mumbai's Finest (Ace, Diefferent, Ninja)
2016	Jammin	Inquilab Mera Khwab	Puneet Krishna	Clinton Cerejo	Hindi	Clinton Cerejo
2015	Single Release	Kuch Na Kaho (Cover)	Javed Akhtar	R. D. Burman	Hindi	Shirley Setia
2019	ICC Cricket World Cup Fan Anthem	Way O Way O	Sonal Dabral	Mickey Mcleary	English	Jahmiel (Jamaica), Catherine Taylor Dawson (UK), Simba Diallo (NZ), Khayelitsha United Mambazo (South Africa)
2019	Mcdowells No. 1 Yaari Jam	Apni Yaari	Amitabh Bhattacharya	SANAM & Clinton Cerejo	Hindi	
2019	Single Release	Aaj Kal Tere mere Pyar Ke Charche	Hasrat Jaipuri	Shankar Jaikishan	Hindi	Sanah Moidutty

== Awards ==
- Winner of Times Music Supastars in 2010 as SQS Project
- Best Music Content Creator (National Category) in 2017
- Radio City Freedom Awards 2019 for their song "Itni Door" in the Best Pop Artist (People's Choice) category
