= Campus Diaries =

2022 Indian TV series

- Genre: Drama
- Directed by: Prem Mistry; Abhishek Yadav
- Starring: Harsh Beniwal; Ritvik Sahore; Saloni Gaur; Salonie Patel; Abhinav Sharma; Srishti Ganguli Rindani
- Country of origin: India
- Original language: Hindi
- No. of seasons: 1
- No. of episodes: 12

Production
- Production location: India
- Running time: 40 mins

Original release
- Network: MX Player
- Release: 7 January 2022

Campus Diaries is an Indian Hindi-language drama television series directed by Prem Mistry and Abhishek Yadav. The series features Harsh Beniwal, Ritvik Sahore, Saloni Gaur, Salonie Patel, Abhinav Sharma, and Srishti Ganguli Rindani in the lead role. The first season premiered on MX Player on 7 January 2022.

== Cast ==
- Harsh Beniwal as Sudheer Kumar
- Ritvik Sahore as Abhilash "Abhi" Govardhan Sharma
- Saloni Gaur as Priyanka Chaturvedi
- Salonie Patel as Sushmita a.k.a. "Sush"
- Abhinav Sharma as Raghav Gupta
- Srishti Ganguli Rindani as Sanya
- Meherzan Mazda as Nikhil

== Episodes ==
Series	Episodes	Originally released
1	12	7 January 2022

== Reception ==
Shaheen Irani of Ottplay gave it a rating of 3.5 out of 5. Pankaj shukla from Amar Ujala gave it a rating 3 out of 5.
