= Vishal Jethwa =

Indian actor (born 1994)

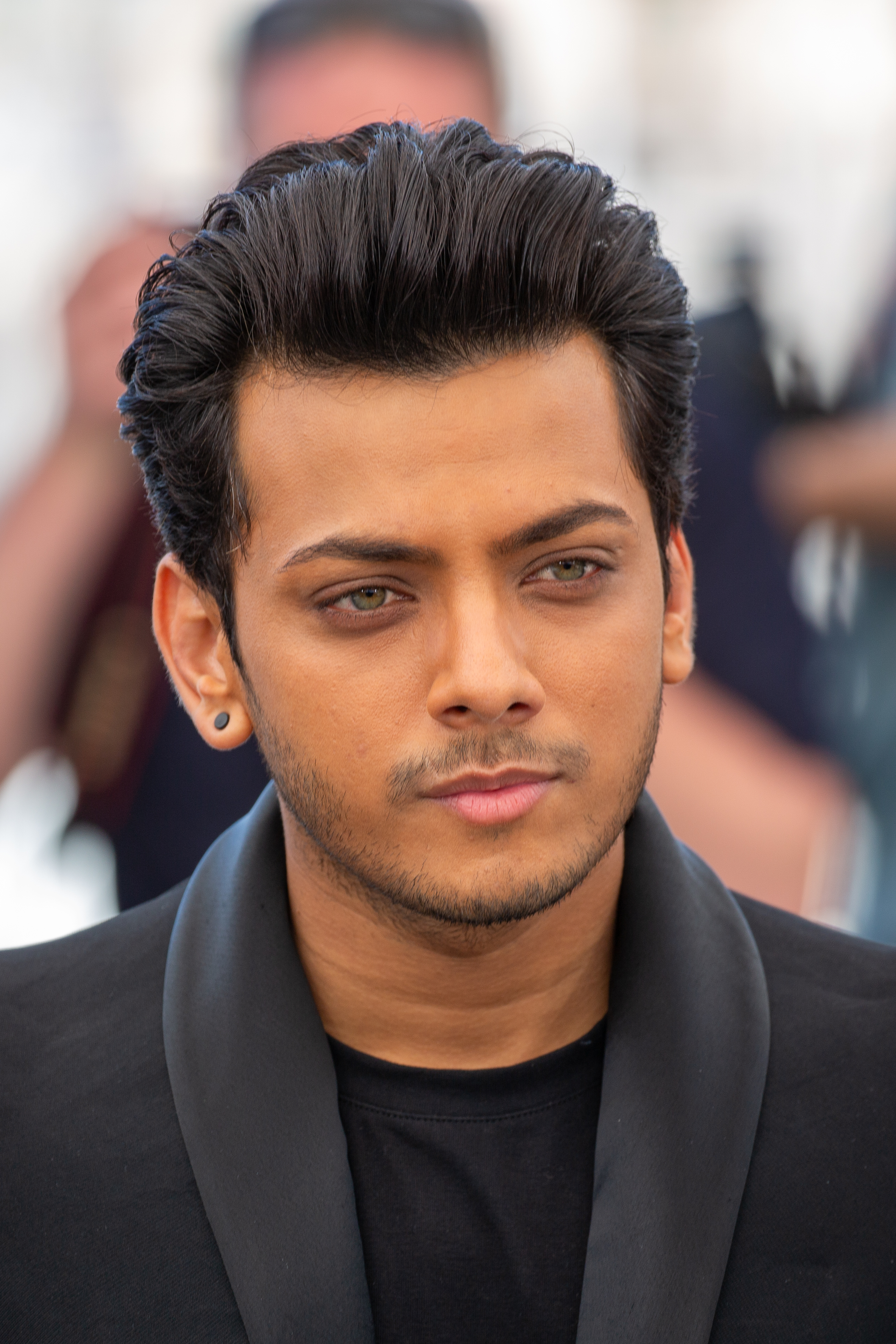
- Jethwa at the 2025 Cannes Film Festival
- Born: 6 July 1994 (age 32); Bombay (now Mumbai), Maharashtra, India
- Education: Thakur College of Science and Commerce
- Occupation: Actor
- Years active: 2013–present
- Awards: Zee Cine Awards (2020)

Vishal Jethwa (born 6 July 1994) is an Indian actor. He is known for portraying Akbar in Bharat Ka Veer Putra – Maharana Pratap which aired on Sony TV, Sunny in Mardaani 2 (2019) and Chandan in Homebound (2025).

== Early life ==
Jethwa was born on 6 July 1994 into a Gujarati family in Bombay (now Mumbai), Maharashtra, India to Naresh and Preeti Jethwa. His father died when he was 13, and he was raised by his mother. According to him, his childhood was full of struggles. He graduated from Thakur College of Science and Commerce.

== Career ==
Vishal started his acting career in 2013 by landing the lead role of Akbar in Bharat Ka Veer Putra – Maharana Pratap. In 2015, he was roped in to play Bali in Sankatmochan Mahabali Hanuman. In 2016, he landed an important role of a terrorist in Diya Aur Baati Hum as Chota Packet. In the same year, he bagged the role of Nasir in Peshwa Bajirao. In August 2017, he replaced actor Bhavesh Balchandani to play the role of Krishna in Chakradhari Ajay Krishna. He also appeared in Colors TV's Thapki Pyar Ki as Prince, and played a role in Ghatotkacha, which aired on Life OK.

In his Hindi film debut, Jethwa was cast as the main antagonist in the 2019 film Mardaani 2. His performance was well received by the critics and the audience.

In 2022, he featured in Disney+ Hotstar's medical thriller series Human alongside Shefali Shah and Kirti Kulhari. Later that year, he played the title role in Revathi's slice of life drama film, Salaam Venky, co-starring Kajol, Rajeev Khandelwal, Rahul Bose, Prakash Raj and Aahana Kumra.

In May 2023, Jethwa played a pivotal role in Vidyut Jammwal's IB71. He also featured as Hassan Ali in Tiger 3. In December 2024, he starred in Amazon-MX Player's murder mystery Party Till I Die, alongside Avneet Kaur.

In 2025, he starred in Neeraj Ghaywan's Homebound, which had its world premiere at the 2025 Cannes Film Festival.

== Filmography ==
=== Films ===
Year	Title	Role	Notes	Ref.
2014	Darr @ the Mall	Unnamed		
2017	Hindi Medium	Tea Seller		
2018	Inaam 100 Karod	IPS Shiv		
2019	Mardaani 2	Shiv "Sunny" Prasad Yadav / Bajrang Chaiwala		
2020	Golkeri	Uber driver	Cameo appearance; Gujarati film	
2022	Salaam Venky	Kolavennu Venkatesh "Venky" Prasad Krishnan		
2023	IB71	Qasim Qureshi		
2023	Tiger 3	Hassan Ali		
2025	Homebound	Chandan Kumar		
2026	3 Monkeys †			
2027	Shakti Shalini †			

=== Television ===
Year	Title	Role	Ref.
2013–2014	Bharat Ka Veer Putra – Maharana Pratap	Young Akbar	
2014	Oye Jassie	Vivek	
2015	Sankatmochan Mahabali Hanuman	Bali	
2016	Crime Patrol	Vicky Sharma	
2016	Ek Duje Ke Vaaste	Young Shravan	
2016	Peshwa Bajirao	Nasir Jung	
2016	Diya Aur Baati Hum	Chota Packet	
2017	Thapki Pyar Ki	Prince Shekhawat	
2017–2018	Chakradhari Ajay Krishna	Krishna	
2022	Human	Mangu	
2024	Party Till I Die	Raunak "Daddy" Kataria	
2026	Cleanup Up Company	Raju	

=== Music videos ===
Year	Title	Singer	Label	Ref.
2021	Dhat	Arko Pravo Mukherjee	Arko Pravo	

== Awards and nominations ==
Year	Award	Category	Work	Result	Ref.
2020	65th Filmfare Awards	Best Male Debut	Mardaani 2	Nominated	
2020	Zee Cine Awards	Best Male Debut	Mardaani 2	Won	
2020	21st IIFA Awards	Best Supporting Actor	Mardaani 2	Nominated	
2022	Filmfare OTT Awards	Best Supporting Actor in a Series (Male): Drama	Human	Nominated	
