= Party Till I Die =

2024 Indian television series

- Promotional poster
- Genre: Romance; Drama
- Directed by: Akhilesh Vats
- Starring: Avneet Kaur; Vishal Jethwa
- Music by: Shaan
- Country of origin: India
- Original language: Hindi
- No. of episodes: 6

Production
- Camera setup: Multi-camera
- Running time: 18–28 mins
- Production company: Rusk Studios

Original release
- Network: Amazon MX Player
- Release: 24 December 2024

Party Till I Die is a 2024 Indian Hindi-language romance drama television series starring Avneet Kaur and Vishal Jethwa. The series premiered on 24 December 2024 on Amazon MX Player.

== Cast ==
- Avneet Kaur
- Vishal Jethwa
- Binita Budathoki
- Sanya Sagar
- Shalaka Aapte
- Ansh Pandey
- Yatin Mehta
- Manav Soneji

== Production ==
The series was announced on Amazon MX Player. The trailer of the series was released on 20 December 2024.

== Release ==
The series was made available to stream on Amazon MX Player on 24 December 2024.

== Reception ==
A critic from ABP News and Punjab Kesari reviewed the series.

== Awards and nominations ==
Year	Award ceremony	Category	Nominee / Work	Result	Ref.
2025	OTTPlay Awards	Rising Star of the Year	Avneet Kaur	Won	
