= Ferrari Ki Sawaari =

2012 Indian film by Rajesh Mapuskar

- Theatrical film poster
- Directed by: Rajesh Mapuskar
- Written by: Rajesh Mapuskar; Vidhu Vinod Chopra; Rajkumar Hirani
- Produced by: Vidhu Vinod Chopra
- Starring: Sharman Joshi; Boman Irani; Ritvik Sahore; Vidya Balan; Paresh Rawal; Seema Bhargava Pahwa; Deepak Shirke; Aakash Dabhade; Vijay Nikam; Nilesh Diwekar; Bhalchandra Kadam
- Cinematography: Sudheer Palsane
- Edited by: Deepa Bhatia; Rajkumar Hirani
- Music by: Songs: Pritam; Score: Tapas Relia
- Production company: Vinod Chopra Films
- Distributed by: Eros International
- Release date: 15 June 2012 (India)
- Running time: 146 minutes
- Country: India
- Language: Hindi
- Budget: ₹10 crore
- Box office: ₹45.69 crore

Ferrari Ki Sawaari (transl. A Ride In The Ferrari) is a 2012 Indian Hindi-language sports comedy drama film written and directed by Rajesh Mapuskar and produced by Vidhu Vinod Chopra under Vinod Chopra Films. The film stars an ensemble cast of Sharman Joshi, Boman Irani, Ritvik Sahore, Vidya Balan, Paresh Rawal, Seema Bhargava Pahwa, Deepak Shirke, Aakash Dabhade, Vijay Nikam, Nilesh Diwekar, and Bhalchandra Kadam.

== Plot ==
Rustom Deboo also known as Rusy, is a lower-middle-class Parsi head clerk at the Worli Regional Transport Office in Mumbai. Since his wife died, he resides in a small apartment in the Parsi colony along with his young, school-going son, Kayoze Deboo, also known as Kayo, and his elderly, grumpy father, Behram Deboo. Rusy is a completely honest and upright man who teaches his son to emulate him. Kayo has an extreme obsession with cricket with lots of promises, but his father is unable to purchase him enough cricket clothing and equipment because of his meager income. Kayo's school organises a cricket camp in Lord's Cricket Ground, London, which would provide Kayo a chance to play with his role model, Sachin Tendulkar. Rusy decides that his son will attend this camp in spite of the hefty fee of ₹1.5 lakh. The hopeless Behram, who is lamenting the tragedy that changed the game of his life, believes that Kayo just wastes his time in playing cricket and unsuccessfully warns Rusy against sending his son to London. Rusy tries every trick in his book to put the money together, but all his efforts go in vain.

In an attempt to fulfill his son's dream, Rusy reluctantly performs his first act of dishonesty by somehow stealing the gleaming red Ferrari car owned by Sachin Tendulkar just for a couple of hours. However, the naive Rusy does not inform the owner of the car about it. A bumpy ride begins that introduces a menagerie of characters: a marriage planner who will stop at nothing; a greedy politician and his reckless son; a Laurel-and-Hardyesque pair of loyal attendants; and a mechanic who specialises in stolen cars.

== Cast ==
- Sharman Joshi as Rustom Behram Deboo (Rusy): Behram's son; Kayo's father
- Boman Irani as Behram Ardeshir Deboo: Rusy's father; Kayo's paternal grandfather
- Ritvik Sahore as Kayoze Rustom Deboo (Kayo): Rusy's son; Behram's grandson
- Vidya Balan in "Mala Jau De" song (cameo appearance)
- Paresh Rawal as Dilip N. Dharmadhikari: Behram's childhood friend
- Seema Bhargava Pahwa as Babbu Chanchal Didi
- Deepak Shirke as Mahavir Tambe (Mama): Sachin Tendulkar's security guard
- Aakash Dabhade as Mohan: Sachin Tendulkar's domestic worker
- Vijay Nikam as Corporator Tatyasaheb Mandke
- Nilesh Diwekar as Prakash Tatyasaheb Mandke (Pakya)
- Bhalchandra Kadam as Shamshu Bhai: garage owner
- Uday Sabnis as Inspector Kadam: Rustom's accquaintance
- Satyadeep Mishra as Vilayat Sir: Kayo's cricket coach
- Achyut Potdar as Bat shop owner

== Production ==
Rajesh Mapuskar worked as an associate director on films including 3 Idiots (2009) and Lage Raho Munna Bhai (2006). The idea for one of his later projects originated during the post-production of Lage Raho Munna Bhai. While working on an advertising assignment in Mumbai, Mapuskar searched for luxury cars and was able to find several, but not a Ferrari. He eventually located one parked in the Pali Hill area, which inspired the question: what would happen if such a car were taken for a day? This premise later evolved into a story concept involving Sachin Tendulkar’s Ferrari. The script was subsequently developed over a period of approximately seven and a half years in collaboration with Vidhu Vinod Chopra.

== Music ==
Ferrari Ki Sawaari

Soundtrack album by Pritam
- Released: 21 May 2012
- Genre: Feature film soundtrack
- Length: 29:06
- Label: T-Series
- Producer: Vidhu Vinod Chopra

Pritam chronology
Jannat 2 (2012)	Ferrari Ki Sawaari (2012)	Cocktail (2012)

The soundtrack is composed by Pritam with a background score by Tapas Relia. The album consists of seven original tracks. The lyrics were penned by Swanand Kirkire, Amitabh Bhattacharya, Guru Thakur and duo Satyanshu and Devanshu Singh.

=== Track listing ===
No.	Title	Lyrics	Singer(s)	Length
1.	"Ferrari Ki Sawaari"	Swanand Kirkire	Shaan, Boman Irani, Aayush Phukan	3:44
2.	"Life Yeh Mausambi Si"	Amitabh Bhattacharya	K. Mohan	4:15
3.	"Aey Mere Mann"	Guru Thakur	Shyamantan Das	5:10
4.	"Mala Jau De"	Devanshu Singh	Urmila Dhangar	4:17
5.	"Maara Re"	Satyanshu Singh	Sonu Nigam, Aishwarya Nigam, Rana Majmuder, Ashish	3:39
6.	"Good Night"	Pritam	Priyani Vani	5:11

== Reception ==
Subhash K. Jha of IANS gave 3 out 5 stars and said, "The dialogues in Ferrari Ki Sawaari lack the punch of Hirani's Munnabhai films but the heart is still in the right place. Honestly, the film is hard to dislike. It has moments of immense warmth and humour." Rajeev Masand of CNN IBN gave 2.5/5 stars and mentioned that "it would have been a good movie if was kept short." Taran Adarsh of Bollywood Hungama gave it 3.5 out 5 stars, saying that "This heartwarming, tender and sprightly film should not be missed!". Rediff gave 2.5 stars out of 5. Rachit Gupta of Filmfare gave a rating of 4 stars out of 5. He said,"Ferrari Ki Sawaari is a well constructed film that switches between drama and comedy with ease. Hirani's dialogue is pitch-perfect." Madhureeta Mukherjee of The Times of India gave four stars out of five, with Kunal Guha of Yahoo! Movies and Sonia Chopra of Sify giving 1.5 and 3 stars out of five respectively.

== Box office ==
=== India ===
Ferrari Ki Sawaari collected ₹3.04 crore nett approx. on day one. The film showed growth on Saturday and Sunday to around ₹10.87 crore; and made additional ₹7.05 crore by end of the first week for a total of ₹20.96 crore nett. Ferrari Ki Sawaari made a lifetime collection of ₹28.10 crore - ₹30.52 crore nett in India and a worldwide gross of ₹45.69 crore.

=== Overseas ===
Ferrari Ki Sawaari collected a gross of around $1.2 million overseas. The gross collections from major markets were: UK - £140,000; North America (Canada & USA) - $435,000; UAE - $385,000; Australia - $53,700.
