= Salaam Venky =

2022 film directed by Revathi

- Theatrical release poster
- Directed by: Revathi
- Screenplay by: Sammeer Arora
- Dialogues by: Kausar Munir
- Story by: Shrikant Murthy
- Based on: The Last Hurrah by Shrikant Murthy
- Produced by: Connekkt Media; Suraj Singh; Shraddha Agrawal; Varsha Kukreja
- Starring: Kajol; Vishal Jethwa
- Cinematography: Ravi Varman
- Edited by: Manan Ajay Sagar
- Music by: Mithoon
- Production companies: Connekkt Media; Blive Productions; RTake Studios
- Distributed by: Zee Cinema
- Release date: 9 December 2022
- Running time: 136 minutes
- Country: India
- Language: Hindi
- Box office: ₹1.99 crore

Salaam Venky (transl. Salute to you, Venky) is a 2022 Indian Hindi-language slice-of-life drama film directed by Revathi. The film is produced by Connekkt Media along with Suraj Singh and Shraddha Agrawal through their banners, Blive Productions and RTake Studios, respectively. The film stars Kajol and Vishal Jethwa (as the title character) in the lead roles. It is centered around the true story of a mother who does everything she can to let her son, diagnosed with Duchenne muscular dystrophy, live life to the fullest. The film is based on the book The Last Hurrah by Shrikanth Murthy, which is based on the real-life events of Kolavennu Venkatesh and his mother, K. Sujata from Andhra Pradesh.

The film was announced on 7 October 2021 by Revathi and Kajol. Principal photography began on 11 February 2022; the first schedule took place in Mumbai. The film was theatrically released on 9 December 2022.

== Plot ==
Diagnosed with Duchenne muscular dystrophy, Venkatesh is supposed to be sick and die by the age of 16. Instead, his zest for life, determination, and soaring human spirit surprise medical science. The ever-smiling Venkatesh wants to donate his organs before he leaves this world. At 24-years-old, he challenges the state, and the law of the country and earns his place in the hearts of people.

== Cast ==
- Kajol as Kolavennu Sujata Krishnan
- Kamal Sadanah as Karunesh Prasad, Venky's father (special appearance)
- Vishal Jethwa as Kolavennu Venkatesh "Venky" Prasad Krishnan
  - Aarman Sawant as young Venkatesh (10 yrs)
  - Raunak Sharma as young Venkatesh (4 yrs)
- Riddhi Kumar as Sharda Prasad Krishnan, Venky's sister
  - Richi Sharma as young Sharda
- Aneet Padda as Nandini
- Prakash Raj as Judge Anupam Bhatnagar
- Rahul Bose as Lawyer Parvez Alam
- Priyamani as Nanda Kumar, the Public Prosecutor
- Rajeev Khandelwal as Dr. Shekhar Tripathi
- Aahana Kumra as Sanjana Aggarwal, TV Journalist
- Warina Husain as Aisa
- Anant Mahadevan as Guruji
- Maala Parvathi as Nurse Clara
- Geeta Sodhi as Bhavani
- Jaineeraj Rajpurohit as Mohan
- Dilip Dhupia as Editor Partha Roy
- Ajit Bhure as Ravindra Kaushik
- Saurabh Sharma as Mr Bharadwaj
- Thirunavukkarasu as Ranganayak
- Aamir Khan as an illusion of Sujata (special appearance)
- Revathi as Radha Bhatnagar, Judge's wife (uncredited appearance)

== Production ==
The film was announced in October 2021, tentatively titled The Last Hurrah. The announcement consisted of a picture of the lead and the director. Later however, the name was changed to Salaam Venky when the shooting commenced.

The main parts of the film were shot from February–April 2022 in India, the remaining parts were shot later on in the year including Aamir Khan's cameo. Filming wrapped up on 3 October 2022.

== Soundtrack ==
Salaam Venky

Soundtrack album by Mithoon
- Released: 7 December 2022
- Recorded: 2021–22
- Genre: Feature film soundtrack
- Length: 29:22
- Label: Zee Music Company

Official audio
- Salaam Venky - Full Album on YouTube

Singles from Salmaam Venky
- 1. "Dhan Te Nan Zindagi" Released: 23 November 2022; 2. "Yu Tere Hue Hum" Released: 30 November 2022; 3. "Jo Tum Saath Ho" Released: 6 December 2022

The music of the film is composed by Mithoon. Lyrics are penned by Mithoon, Sandeep Shrivastava and Kausar Munir.

Track listing
No.	Title	Lyrics	Singer(s)	Length
1.	"Jo Tum Saath Ho"	Mithoon	Arijit Singh	5:49
2.	"Dhan Te Nan Zindagi"	Mithoon	Mohit Chauhan, Mithoon	4:18
3.	"Yu Tere Hue Hum"	Mithoon	Jubin Nautiyal, Palak Muchhal	3:59
4.	"Anda Bata Paratha"	Sandeep Shrivastava	Benny Dayal, Mithoon, Aditi Singh Sharma	3:18
5.	"Jo Tum Saath Ho" (Duet)	Mithoon	Arijit Singh, Shreya Ghoshal	5:49
6.	"Badi Zindagi"	Kausar Munir	Shaan	3:13
7.	"Jo Tum Saath Ho" (Lullaby)	Mithoon	Shreya Ghoshal, Shambhavi Thakur, Sminit Mhatre	1:56
Total length:				29:22

== Release ==
=== Theatrical ===
Salaam Venky was released on 9 December 2022 in cinemas.

=== Home media ===
The digital and satellite rights are held by ZEE5 and Zee Cinema, respectively. The film was premiered on ZEE5 from 10 February 2023.

== Reception ==
On the review aggregator website Rotten Tomatoes, 25% of 8 critics' reviews are positive, with an average rating of 5.8/10.

Dhaval Roy of The Times of India rated the film 4 out of 5 stars and wrote "The heart-touching fare, replete with positivity as much as pain, is a must-watch".
