= Laakhon Mein Ek =

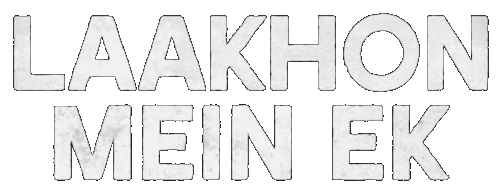
- Created by: Biswa Kalyan Rath
- Written by: Shweta More
- Screenplay by: Rath; Vaspar Dandiwala (Season 1)
- Story by: Biswa Kalyan Rath; Karan Agarwal
- Directed by: Abhishek Sengupta
- Country of origin: India
- Original language: Hindi
- No. of seasons: 2
- No. of episodes: 14

Production
- Executive producers: Ruby Thakur (Season 1); Varsha Venkatesan (Season 2)
- Cinematography: Aakash Agrawal
- Editors: Shan Mohammed; Shraddha Sarfare; Abhimanyu Chaudhary
- Production company: OML Production

Original release
- Network: Prime Video
- Release: 13 October 2017 – 12 April 2019

Laakhon Mein Ek (transl. One in a Million) is an Indian television series created by Biswa Kalyan Rath produced by OML Production. It is an Amazon Prime Video original series. Season 1 premiered on October 13, 2017, premise of the series revolved around the struggles of Aakash, a teenage student from Raipur who is sent to a coaching centre Genius Infinity in Visakhapatnam for preparation of IIT entrance exam. Season 2 premiered on April 12, 2019, and was about Dr. Shreya and her fight with government for healthcare in Sitlapur Village.

== Premise ==
=== Season 1 ===
Aakash Gupta wants to make mimicry videos and become an internet sensation, but his father wants him to be an IITian and an engineer. He doesn't get admission in any college in Raipur after getting 55 percent marks in board exams. His father sends him to a coaching institute Genius Infinity in Visakhapatnam where he gets sent to section D, where the students with least marks in 10th Boards are enrolled. He befriends his roommates Chudail and Bakri. The three roommates struggle with the fast-paced academic environment at the institute. Despite feeling like a misfit, he is determined to succeed to fulfill his father's expectations of him.

=== Season 2 ===
Dr Shreya is posted in Sitlapur village to conduct a cataract camp. But the villagers aren't the biggest believers in Government healthcare, the supplies aren't separate from the politics, and the staff isn't the dream team one would desire.

== Cast ==
=== Season 1 ===
- Ritvik Sahore as Aakash
- Alam Khan as Chudail
- Jay Thakkar as Bakri
- Shiv Kumar Subramaniam as Mr Moorthy
- Ajita Kulkarni as Mrs Gupta
- Biswa Kalyan Rath as Professor Trpathi
- Mayank Parakh as Bala Aasuri

=== Season 2 ===
- Shweta Tripathi as Dr. Shreya Pathare
- Sandeep Mehta as Dr. Gopal Patwardhan(CMO)
- Rupesh Tillu as Bhola
- Suyash Joshi as Raju Babu
- Arun Nalawade as Ishwar Mhatre
- Milind Joshi as Health Minister
- Ishan Mishra as Dr. Ankit Gupta
- Pravina Deshpande as Dr. Madhavi
- Prithvik Pratap as Ravi Aathlye

== Production ==
The first draft was totally my story, the second draft was half of my story and half something else, the third was half of the second script and half of the other things, and so on.

— Biswa, talking about his show

It started out as a comedy, but slowly through the writing process, we understood that this is not a story for a comedy. If we have to stay true to their world and the characters, we will have to sacrifice the comedy. We were more than willing to do whatever the story deserves.

— Biswa, talking about his show

Created by Biswa Kalyan Rath, the show is produced by OML Production, directed by Abhishek Sengupta and written by Vaspar Dandiwala, Biswa Kalyan Rath and Karan Agarwal. Biswa began writing Laakhon Mein Ek somewhere between late 2015 and early 2016. Biswa said he started writing the story simultaneously with doing comedy and although from conception to the idea it took two years, the actual writing time is 8–12 months as he was "doing several other things alongside". The script first started as Biswa's own story but later on it developed to its own story, inspired by "people he met and places he has been to". When asked about the casting process, Biswa credits his director, saying that he "wanted to keep it realistic by not making a 22-year-old play an 18-year-old". Sengupta said that "[w]e really lucked out with the boys — Aakash, Bakri, and Chudail (the three protagonists)" and "we wanted to have people who could relate to the characters. Aakash Agarwal handled the cinematography and the production designer was Prashant Bidkar. Ruby Thakur served as the Executive Producer. Shruti Rao and Tihany Sengupta served as the supervising producers".

Biswa started writing Season Two almost immediately after the release of Season One. Collaborating with director Abhishek Sengupta and writer Hussian Haidry, they had innumerable conversations with several medical professionals and public health practitioners to write this story. Aakash Agarwal handled the cinematography, costumer designer was Shivani Shivkumar and the production designer was Snehi Shah. Varsha Venkatesan served as the Executive Producer for the Second Season along with Tihany Sengupta as the supervising producer.

== Episodes ==
=== Season 1 ===
No.	Title	Directed by	Written by	Original release date
1	"Projectile"	Abhishek Sengupta	Biswa Kalyan Rath; Vaspar Dandiwala; Karan Agarwal	13 October 2017
Aakash Gupta wants to be a mimicry artist and an internet sensation. He got 55 percent marks in his board exams and his name wasn't in the first two lists of accepted students for a college. His father sends him away to Genius Infinity, a coaching institute, to prepare for IIT entrance exams despite Aakash being against it.
2	"Pressure"	Abhishek Sengupta	Biswa Kalyan Rath; Vaspar Dandiwala; Karan Agarwal	13 October 2017
3	"Equilibrium"	Abhishek Sengupta	Biswa Kalyan Rath; Vaspar Dandiwala; Karan Agarwal	13 October 2017
Aakash is consistently getting high marks and topping section D. Chudail advises Aakash to intentionally get low marks occasionally so he doesn't raise suspicion but Aakash brushes him off. They visit the peon to get cigarettes, chocolates, chips and dawai (slang for a drug that helps students to stay awake late at night and study). The peon hands over first three items but informs them that dawai is unavailable as Moorthy is getting very strict because CBSE inspectors are visiting. Bala summons every student to mess, where Moorthy announces that Aakash is getting promoted to section A for his hard work. Aakash informs his father about this, who tells him not get overconfident and study hard. He shifts to room A2, where Krishna used to stay and Chandu currently stays. Aakash decides that he'll not cheat anymore and study on his own. Chandu tries to humiliate Aakash in the mess by asking a physics question when Aakash says that "they're on the same level" but this backfires when instead of answering the question, Aakash asks questions about Indian cinema. Aakash tries to study honestly for next exam but he's too far behind the syllabus and unable to catch up. In the exam he sees Chudail and Bakri going to the toilet to cheat and decides that he'll cheat too and goes to the toilet. Chandu gets suspicious and he goes after Aakash and finds the cheat sheet. He runs to Moorthy's office with the sheet, where Moorthy is talking to CBSE inspectors about the license to become an official college.
4	"Roots"	Abhishek Sengupta	Biswa Kalyan Rath; Vaspar Dandiwala; Karan Agarwal	13 October 2017
5	"Minima"	Abhishek Sengupta	Biswa Kalyan Rath; Vaspar Dandiwala; Karan Agarwal	13 October 2017
6	"Entropy"	Abhishek Sengupta	Biswa Kalyan Rath; Vaspar Dandiwala; Karan Agarwal	13 October 2017
Aakash wants to kill himself by jumping off the terrace but Bakri persuades Aakash not to. Aakash tells Bakri that he really wants to escape Genius Infinity immediately. They go outside and find that every hostel room for section D is locked and that the whole section A is getting escorted somewhere else. Bakri starts unlocking the locked hostel doors and Aakash starts hitting the locked front gate when another section A student sees him and loudly announces that a section D student is outside. Aakash starts hitting that boy when Bala comes and throws Aakash off and starts beating Aakash. Section D students start gathering around Aakash and Bala. Aakash starts yelling "Bala is a motherfucker" repeatedly. Other section D students start attacking Bala, leaving him badly injured. This starts a hostel wide riot and police is called. The institute's principal tells the inspector to just arrest the section D boys and only cut out the parts where section A boys are seen from the CCTV footage. Upon overhearing this, Aakash destroys the CPU. He gets escorted back to his home where his friends inform him that his name was in the third list and he was selected for the commerce college. He confronts his father about why they lied to him and didn't tell him about the acceptance letter. They get in an argument and his father tells him that he'll have to study science in a local university and prepare for IIT in a local coaching institute. Aakash runs away from his home in the night.

=== Season 2 ===
No.	Title	Directed by	Written by	Original release date
1	"Heart Attack in Sambhaji Nagar"	Abhishek Sengupta	Biswa Kalyan Rath; Abhishek Sengupta; Hussain Haidry	12 April 2019
2	"Chakma"	Abhishek Sengupta	Biswa Kalyan Rath; Abhishek Sengupta; Hussain Haidry	12 April 2019
3	"Prachaar Prasaar"	Abhishek Sengupta	Biswa Kalyan Rath; Abhishek Sengupta; Hussain Haidry	12 April 2019
4	"Aichaa Daaru"	Abhishek Sengupta	Biswa Kalyan Rath; Abhishek Sengupta; Hussain Haidry	12 April 2019
5	"Rooh"	Abhishek Sengupta	Biswa Kalyan Rath; Abhishek Sengupta; Hussain Haidry	12 April 2019
6	"Lanka Dahan"	Abhishek Sengupta	Biswa Kalyan Rath; Abhishek Sengupta; Hussain Haidry	12 April 2019
7	"Camp"	Abhishek Sengupta	Biswa Kalyan Rath; Abhishek Sengupta; Hussain Haidry	12 April 2019
8	"In-Conclusion"	Abhishek Sengupta	Biswa Kalyan Rath; Abhishek Sengupta; Hussain Haidry	12 April 2019

== Critical reception ==
Laakhon Mein Ek received mixed critical feedback. Rahul Desai of the Film Companion gave three stars out of five to the show, and wrote that "it's the mechanics of this atmosphere – the specifics and little details – that makes this show more lived-in than its mainstream companions". Mid Day's Letty Mariam Abraham wrote that "Laakhon Mein Ek is a powerful drama" and gave it two and a half stars out of five. The Quint's Megha Mathur wrote that "[it] [f]eels like Biswa got a little lazy while writing the end" and "Laakhon Mein Ek is no unique take on Indian parenting and education, but I wish Biswa’s edgy humour had translated into a more satirical and dark drama that stood out in the crowd". Akhil Sood of The Hindu wrote that "Laakhon Mein Ek is not without its flaws — for starters, basing its very premise on an overdone subject — but it succeeds in its raw depiction of a life that leaves lakhs of embittered students in its wake". FirstPost's Utkarsh Srivastava praised the show's music and background score as "top notch" but criticised the show's writing saying that "[s]adly, Laakhon Mein Ek disappoints on the very front it was expected to do well: the writing", and "Biswa cannot translate his comedy gifts into a solid drama storyline". Sampada Sharma of The Indian Express also praised the sound design and said that it is "honestly quite refreshing" to watch the show. Kritika Dua of the Daily Pioneer gave four stars out of five to the show. Aditya Mani Jha of the DailyO praised the show's writing, cinematography and actors' acting and wrote that "Laakhon Mein Ek is a success, smartly written, competently shot with a no-frills aesthetic, and brilliantly acted".
