= Amit Roy =

Indian cinematographer and film director

- Occupations: Cinematographer, film director
- Years active: 2003–present

Amit Roy is an Indian cinematographer and film director who works primarily in Hindi cinema. He is known for his collaborations with directors such as Ram Gopal Varma and Sandeep Reddy Vanga. His credits include Sarkar (2005), Sarkar Raj (2008), Animal (2023), and Deva (2025).

Roy began his career with Ishq Vishk (2003) and gained recognition for his work on Varma's political thrillers. He has also directed the film Running Shaadi (2017) and several television commercials.

== Career ==
=== Cinematography ===
Roy made his debut as a cinematographer with the romantic comedy Ishq Vishk (2003), directed by Ken Ghosh. His work on Ram Gopal Varma's Sarkar (2005), inspired by The Godfather, received attention for its use of low-angle shots and dramatic lighting. He continued collaborating with Varma on films including Aag (2007), Nishabd (2007), Darling (2007), and the sequel Sarkar Raj (2008).

In later years, Roy worked on Chittagong (2012), Love Aaj Kal (2020), and Dhokha: Round D Corner (2022). He shot part of Dunki (2023) before leaving due to creative differences. His cinematography for Animal (2023), directed by Sandeep Reddy Vanga, and Deva (2025), directed by Rosshan Andrrews, has been noted in industry discussions.

=== Direction ===
Roy directed the comedy-drama Running Shaadi (2017), starring Amit Sadh and Taapsee Pannu. He has also directed television commercials featuring actors such as Amitabh Bachchan.

As of 2025, Roy is set to direct Zamana Kya Kahega, a comedy scripted by Mudassar Aziz and starring Taapsee Pannu, Fardeen Khan, and Ammy Virk.

== Filmography ==
=== As cinematographer ===
Year	Title	Notes
2003	Ishq Vishk	
2004	Shaadi Ka Laddoo	
2004	Fida	
2004	Dil Maange More	
2005	Sarkar	
2006	Darna Zaroori Hai	
2007	Aag	
2007	Nishabd	
2007	Darling	
2007	Dus Kahaniyaan	
2008	Sarkar Raj	
2010	Rann	
2011	Dum Maaro Dum	
2011	Shabri	
2012	Chittagong	
2013	Deewana Main Deewana	
2020	Love Aaj Kal	
2020-2022	She	Web series
2022	Ishq Express	Web series
2022	Dhokha: Round D Corner	
2023	Animal	
2023	Dunki	Partial cinematography
2025	Deva	
2026	Prince: Once Upon a Time in Dhaka	Bangladeshi film
2026	Gandhari	

=== As director ===
Year	Title	Notes
2017	Running Shaadi	Also co-writer
TBA	Zamana Kya Kahega	Upcoming
