= Amber Girls School =

2024 Indian TV series

- Genre: Drama
- Written by: Garima Pura Patiyaalvi
- Directed by: Rajlaxmi Ratan Seth
- Starring: Harsh Khurana; Celesti Bairagey; Kajol Chugh; Shruti Ulfat
- Country of origin: India
- Original language: Hindi
- No. of seasons: 2
- No. of episodes: 18

Production
- Production location: India
- Running time: 20 mins

Original release
- Network: Amazon miniTV
- Release: 1 May 2024

Amber Girls School is an Indian Hindi-language drama television series directed by Rajlaxmi Ratan Seth. The series features Harsh Khurana, Celesti Bairagey, Kajol Chugh, and Shruti Ulfat in the lead role. The first season premiered on Amazon miniTV on 1 May 2024. The second season premiered on 26 July 2024.

== Cast ==
- Harsh Khurana
- Celesti Bairagey
- Kajol Chugh
- Shruti Ulfat

== Episodes ==
Series	Episodes	Originally released
1	9	1 May 2024
2	9	26 July 2024

== Reception ==
Abhishek Srivastava of Times of India gave it a rating of 3.5 out of 5 saying that, Amber Girls School’ brings a breath of fresh air, yet it's not immune to clichés that could have been avoided. Set in Chandigarh in 2008, the series packs in Bollywood songs and cultural references from that time, effectively enhancing its appeal. Despite its reliance on familiar tropes, it offers a nostalgic journey for female viewers, reminiscent of their school days, though with a hint of scepticism. Sonal Pandya from Times Now gave it a rating 3 out of 5 saying that Amber Girls School works in large part due to Bairagey's appealing performance. At times, the young actress reminds one quite a bit of a young Alia Bhatt, especially in her appearance. The rest of the cast also create the strict atmosphere of rigidity and rules, with the young students wanting to break free of this uniformity.
