= Indori Ishq =

2021 Indian web series

- Genre: Comedy; Drama; Romance
- Screenplay by: Kunal Marathe
- Directed by: Samit Kakkad
- Starring: Ritvik Sahore; Vedika Bhandari; Aashay Kulkarni; Tithi Raj; Dona Munshi; Meera Joshi; Yashaswi Devadiga
- Country of origin: India
- Original language: Hindi
- No. of seasons: 1
- No. of episodes: 9

Production
- Executive producer: Gautam Talwar Sushil choudhary
- Producers: Amrita Goswami; Durgesh Ashok Gupta
- Production location: India
- Running time: 25 mins

Original release
- Network: MX Player
- Release: 10 June 2021

Indori Ishq is a romantic-drama web series which is directed by Samit Kakkad and written by Kunal Marathe. The show features Ritvik Sahore, Vedika Bhandari, Aashay Kulkarni. The show was released on 10 June 2021 and in a very small period of time, it gained popularity with positive response in all over the country because the story is quite very interesting and emotional.

== Plot ==
The story begins with amusing attempts of twelfth-grader, Kunal, to woo his classmate, Tara. Kunal finally manages to propose to Tara and their love story begins. After his schooling, Kunal leaves Indore and moves to Mumbai to join a Naval College. Soon his sober life turns upside-down when Tara dumps him for someone else. In no time, Kunal turns into an alcoholic and chain smoker, and without taking admission in the naval college, he moves to a weird rundown room in Darukhana, spending days doing nothing but drinking, smoking, and missing Tara. Later Kunal gets played by Tara once again as things turn up against his fate.

== Cast ==
- Ritvik Sahore as Kunal Marathe
- Vedika Bhandari as Tara
- Aashay Kulkarni as Mahesh
- Tithi Raaj as Kamna
- Donna Munshi as Reshma
- Mira Joshi as Alia
- Yashaswi Devadiga as Edline
- Deepti Devi as Kunal's sister
- Abha Velankar as Kunal's mother
- Ujjwal Gauraha as Weapon Supplier
- Mira Jagannath as Special appearance
- Santosh Juvekar as Police Inspector
- Sushant Shelar as ACP

== Music ==
Indori Ishq

Soundtrack album
- Studio: MX Player
- Genre: Web Series Music
- Language: Hindi
- Label: Sangeet Music

Tracklist
No.	Title	Length
1.	"Love Mein Lagi Hai"
2.	"Ishqadar"
