= Famously Filmfare =

Indian celebrity talk show

- Genre: Talk show
- Created by: Filmfare; Content Studio
- Presented by: Full list
- Country of origin: India
- Original languages: Hindi; Bengali; Marathi; Kannada; Punjabi; Tamil; Telugu; Malayalam

Production
- Camera setup: Multi-camera
- Production company: Frames Production Company

Original release
- Network: MX Player
- Release: 2017 – 2019

Famously Filmfare is an Indian talk show created by Filmfare in association with Content Studio, providing an intimate glimpse into the personal and professional lives of prominent figures from the Indian film industry. It debuted in 2017 with its Hindi version, which has aired two seasons. Additionally, the show has had one season each in Bengali, Marathi, Tamil, Telugu, Malayalam, Kannada, and Punjabi. The first season of the Hindi version was sponsored by Jio, while the second season was sponsored by American Express—both seasons were streamed on YouTube. The regional versions of the show aired on MX Player.

== Overview ==
Versions	Host	Season(s)	No. of episodes	Year	Ref.
Bengali	Abir Chatterjee	1	11	2019	
Hindi	Jitesh Pillai	1	8	2017	
Hindi	Jitesh Pillai	2	10	2018	
Kannada	Priyamani	1	6	2019	
Malayalam	Priyamani	1	6	2019	
Marathi	Amruta Khanvilkar	1	12	2019	
Punjabi	Surveen Chawla	1	5	2019	
Tamil	Bhavana Balakrishnan	1	5	2019	
Telugu	Chinmayi Sripada	1	10	2019	

== Episodes ==
=== Hindi Season 1 ===
No. in season	Guests	Original release date
1	Katrina Kaif	2017
2	Deepika Padukone	2017
3	Ranbir Kapoor	2017
4	Alia Bhatt	2017
5	Varun Dhawan	2017
6	Kareena Kapoor	2017
7	Karan Johar	2017
8	Ranveer Singh	2017

=== Hindi Season 2 ===
No. in season	Guests	Original release date
1	Deepika Padukone	2018
2	Ayushmann Khurrana	2018
3	Janhvi Kapoor	2018
4	Aishwarya Rai Bachchan	2018
5	Ranveer Singh	2018
6	Shahid Kapoor	2018
7	Sara Ali Khan	2018
8	Anil Kapoor	2018
9	Vicky Kaushal	2018
10	Katrina Kaif	2018

=== Bengali ===
No. in season	Guests	Original release date
1	Koel Mallick	19 February 2019
2	Vikram Chatterjee	27 February 2019
3	Paoli Dam	6 March 2019
4	Srijit Mukherjee	13 March 2019
5	Tanusree Chakraborty	20 March 2019
6	Rituparna Sengupta	27 March 2019
7	Sauraseni Maitra	3 April 2019
8	Parambrata Chatterjee	10 April 2019
9	Debashree Roy	17 April 2019
10	Ishaa Saha	24 April 2019
11	Ridhima Ghosh	1 May 2019

=== Marathi ===
No. in season	Guests	Original release date
1	Sai Tamhankar	19 February 2019
2	Swwapnil Joshi	27 February 2019
3	Amey Wagh	6 March 2019
4	Priya Bapat	13 March 2019
5	Gashmeer Mahajani	20 March 2019
6	Sonali Kulkarni	27 March 2019
7	Manasi Naik	3 April 2019
8	Renuka Shahane	10 April 2019
9	Subodh Bhave	17 April 2019
10	Mukta Barve	24 April 2019
11	Rinku Rajguru	1 May 2019
12	Jitendra Joshi	8 May 2019

=== Kannada ===
No. in season	Guests	Original release date
1	Puneeth Rajkumar	19 February 2019
2	Rashmika Mandanna	27 February 2019
3	Shraddha Srinath	6 March 2019
4	Rakshit Shetty	13 March 2019
5	Sruthi Hariharan	20 March 2019
6	Yash	27 March 2019

=== Telugu ===
No. in season	Guests	Original release date
1	Vijay Deverakonda	19 February 2019
2	Rakul Preet Singh	27 February 2019
3	Rana Daggubati	6 March 2019
4	Samantha Prabhu	13 March 2019
5	Naga Chaitanya	20 March 2019
6	Tamannaah Bhatia	27 March 2019
7	Shruti Haasan	3 April 2019
8	Ram Pothineni	10 April 2019
9	Kalyani Priyadarshan	17 April 2019
10	Sudheer Babu	24 April 2019

=== Tamil ===
No. in season	Guests	Original release date
1	R. Madhavan	19 February 2019
2	Tamannaah Bhatia	27 February 2019
3	Arvind Swamy	6 March 2019
4	Shruti Hassan	13 March 2019
5	Kajal Aggarwal	20 March 2019

=== Malayalam ===
No. in season	Guests	Original release date
1	Bhavana	1 February 2019
2	Tovino Thomas	27 February 2019
3	Mamta Mohandas	6 March 2019
4	Antony Varghese	13 March 2019
5	Manju Warrier	20 March 2019
6	Rima Kallingal	27 March 2019
