= Highway Love =

Indian romantic drama television series

- Release poster
- Genre: Drama; Romance
- Screenplay by: Chris George; Siddharth Hirwe
- Story by: Chiranjeevi Bajpai; Riya Poojary
- Directed by: Shahir Raza
- Starring: Ritvik Sahore; Gayatri Bhardwaj
- Theme music composer: Soutrik chakraborty
- Country of origin: India
- Original language: Hindi
- No. of seasons: 2
- No. of episodes: 10

Production
- Producer: Sameer Gogate
- Cinematography: Vivian Singh Sahi
- Editor: Satya Sharma
- Camera setup: Multi-camera
- Running time: 30 minutes
- Production company: BBC Studios India

Original release
- Network: Amazon miniTV; Amazon MX Player
- Release: 16 June 2023 – 4 October 2024

Highway Love is an Indian Hindi-language romantic drama television series created by BBC Studios India. The series features Ritvik Sahore and Gayatri Bhardwaj. The first season premiered on Amazon miniTV on 16 June 2023. The second season premiered on 4 October 2024 on Amazon MX Player.

== Cast ==
- Ritvik Sahore as Kartik "Dhun Dhun"
- Gayatri Bhardwaj as Inaaya
- Vvansh S Sethi as Sahil
- Gunit Cour as Meera
- Himika Bose as Nidhi
- Kanupriya Pandit as Kartik's mother
- Max Fernandes as Kartik's father
- Aviral Gupta as Amey
- Sumiet Subash Arora as Udkaka

== Episodes ==
Series	Episodes	Originally released
1	4	16 June 2023
2	6	4 October 2024

== Production ==
The series was announced by BBC Studios India for Amazon miniTV. Ritvik Sahore and Gayatri Bhardwaj were signed as the lead.

== Soundtrack ==
Highway Love

Soundtrack album by Abhigyan Arora, Soutrik Chakraborty
- Released: 2023
- Genre: Soundtrack
- Length: 1:34
- Language: Hindi
External audio
- Na Sata on YouTube

The music for Highway Love is composed by Abhigyan Arora and Soutrik Chakraborty.

Tracklisting
No.	Title	Lyrics	Music	Singer(s)	Length
1.	"Na Sata"	Saudur	Saudur	Saurabh Shetye	1:31
Total length:					1:31

== Reception ==
Sunidhi Prajapat of OTTPlay rated the series 3.5/5 stars. Archika Khurana of Times of india rated 3 out of 5 stars. Vijayalakshmi Narayanan of The Free Press Journal rated the series 3/5 stars.
