= Ritvik Sahore =

Indian actor (born 2000)

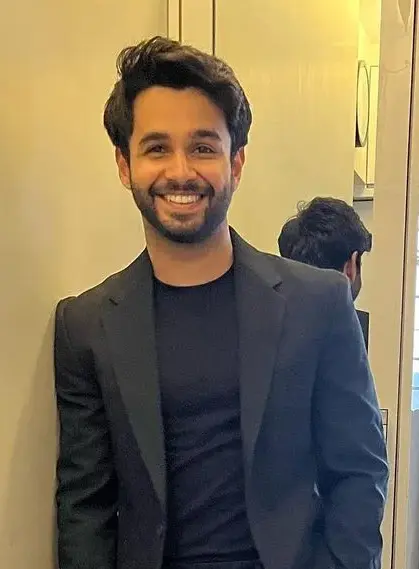
- Sahore in 2023
- Born: 14 September 2000 (age 26); Mumbai, Maharashtra, India
- Occupation: Actor
- Years active: 2012–present

Ritvik Sahore (born 14 September 2000) is an Indian actor who primarily works in Hindi films and web shows. He made his acting debut with Ferrari Ki Sawaari (2012), for which he received Screen Award for Best Child Artist nomination. Sahore is best known for his portrayal of Omkar Singh Phogat in Dangal (2016), Aakash in Laakhon Mein Ek (2017), Kunal Marathe in Indori Ishq (2021) and Rajat Bakshi in Flames (2018).

Sahore's other notable work include the film, Gauru: Journey of Courage (2018) and the web series, Escaype Live and Ishq Express both (2022).

== Early life ==
Ritvik Sahore was born on 14 September 2000 in Mumbai, Maharashtra, India, and grew up in the Goregaon area of the city. His parents are Rajesh Sahore and Monica Sahore. He is from a middle-class family from Bikaner, Rajasthan.

== Career ==
Sahore made his acting debut with Ferrari Ki Sawaari in 2012. He portrayed Sharman Joshi's son in the film. Times of India stated, "Young Ritvik, like a true captain, holds the team together. This little stock of talent is so natural and expressive, he’ll bowl you over." He next portrayed Omkar Singh Phogat, Aparshakti Khurana's younger version in the 2016 film Dangal, which is the highest grossing Indian film.

He did a cameo role of Atul Nadar in the TV series The Good Karma Hospital. The same year, he made his web debut with Laakhon Mein Ek, portraying Akash in the first season of the series. Praising his performance, Mid Day wrote, "Sahore is a treat to watch as he depicts the frustration of a youngster who is a victim of insurmountable expectations."

2018 marked a turning point in Sahore's career. He portrayed the lead in the award-winning film, Gauru: Journey of Courage. He received wide attention with his portrayal of Rajat Bakshi in Flames opposite Tanya Maniktala. The first season released in 2018, second season in 2019. He received praises for his performance. The series renewed for a third season in 2022.

In 2018, he too starred as Ishaan in Awkward Conversations with Parents, opposite Ahsaas Channa. In 2019, he appeared in the short film To Remember Me By. While In 2020, he starred in Awkward Conversations with Girlfriend, a sequel to Awkward Conversations with Parents, opposite Rashmi Agdekar and in the short film, The Twist opposite Gayatri Salkar.

In 2021, Sahore received praises for his portrayal of Kunal Marathe opposite Vedika Bhandari in Indori Ishq. Times of India praised his performance and mentioned, "Sahore's portrayal of a happy-go-lucky man Kunal, is captivating, making the viewers love his character. Kunal’s transformation from a sweet romantic boy to a brooding man, is convincing. The same year, he appeared as Young Matsya in Matsya Kaand.

Sahore had five releases in 2022. He first appeared in Campus Diaries portraying Abhilash. He next portrayed Sachin in Bro-Founders, a mini-series. Sahore then portrayed Nilesh Sonawane aka Aamcha Spider in Escaype Live. News 18 wrote, "Ritvik Sahore as Aamcha Spider, is effortless". Sahore next portrayed Aarav Agarwal opposite Gayatri Bhhardwaj in Ishq Express. Times of India noted, "Both Ritvik Sahore and Gayatri Bhardwaj give delightful performances. Ritvik is convincing as a small-town lad who is unsure of what he wants to do with his life". He then portrayed Finolex founder Pralhad P. Chhabria in the award winning short film, Pralhad.

In June 2023, he was seen in Manish Tiwary's Chidiakhana alongside Avneet Kaur.

== Filmography ==
=== Films ===
Year	Title	Role	Notes	Ref.
2012	Ferrari Ki Sawaari	Kayoze "Kayo" Rustom Deboo		
2016	Dangal	Teenage Omkar Singh Phogat		
2018	Gauru: Journey of Courage	Gauru		
2019	To Remember Me By	Anand Sehgal	Short film	
2020	The Twist	Shlok	Short film	
2022	Pralhad	Pralhad P. Chhabria	Short film	
2023	Chidiakhana	Sooraj		
2026	Prahaar: The Untold Story of Ujjwal Nikam	Aniket Nikam		

=== Television ===
Year	Title	Role	Notes	Ref.
2017	The Good Karma Hospital	Atul Nadar	Season 1; English series	

=== Web series ===
Year	Title	Role	Notes	Ref.
2017	Laakhon Mein Ek	Aakash	Season 1	
2018-2023	Flames	Rajat "Rajjo" Bakshi	4 seasons	
2018	Awkward Conversations with Parents	Ishaan	2 seasons	
2020	Awkward Conversations with Girlfriend	Ishaan		
2020	Best Friends	Nikhil		
2021	Indori Ishq	Kunal Marathe		
2021	Matsya Kaand	Young Matsya		
2022–2026	Campus Diaries	Abhilash	Season 1–2	
2022	Escaype Live	Nilesh Sonawane / Aamcha Spider		
2022	Bro-Founders	Sachin		
2022	Ishq Express	Aarav Agarwal		
2023–present	Highway Love	Kartik		
2024–present	Jamnapaar	Shanky Bansal		

=== Music video appearances ===
Year	Title	Singer	Ref.
2019	"Let's Crack It - Student Anthem"	Naezy, Dub Sharma	
2020	"Yeh Saari Baat"	Rochak Kohli	

== Awards and nominations ==
Year	Award	Category	Work	Result	Ref.
2013	Screen Awards	Best Child Artist	Ferrari Ki Sawaari	Nominated	
2017	China International Children's Film Festival	Best Performance	Gauru: Journey of Courage	Won	
2018	IReel Awards	Best Actor (Drama)	Laakhon Mein Ek	Nominated	
2020	Mumbai International Film Festival	Best Actor	To Remember Me By	Won	
2022	21st Indian Television Academy Awards	Popular Actor – OTT	Indori Ishq	Nominated	
2022	22nd Indian Television Academy Awards	Popular Actor – OTT	Campus Diaries	Nominated	
2022	22nd Indian Television Academy Awards	Popular Actor – OTT	Escaype Live	Nominated	
2024	Filmfare OTT Awards	Best Actor in a Series (Male): Drama	Jamnapaar	Nominated	
