= Running Shaadi =

- Directed by: Amit Roy
- Written by: Navjot Gulati & Amit Roy
- Produced by: Shoojit Sircar; Crouching Tiger Motion Pictures
- Starring: Amit Sadh; Taapsee Pannu; Arsh Bajwa; Richa Meena; Abhishek Sharma
- Cinematography: Anas Ali Khan
- Edited by: Nipun Gupta
- Music by: Anupam Roy; Sanjeev Chimmalgi; Abhishek-Akshay; Zeb
- Production company: Rising Sun Films
- Release date: 17 February 2017
- Running time: 114 minutes
- Language: Hindi

Running Shaadi (transl. 'Running wedding'), previously known as: Runningshaadi.com, is an Indian romantic comedy film produced by Shoojit Sircar and Crouching Tiger Motion Pictures about the unique concept of helping people elope to get married. The unlikely duo of a conscientious Bihari and a Sardarji geek create a platform providing "High Take Social Service" to Indian couples who want to spend their lives with their soulmates. The film was shot in late 2013. The film was released on 17 February 2017.

The Shoojit Sircar production stars Amit Sadh, Taapsee Pannu, Saahir Banwait, and Arsh Bajwa. It was released on over 1,100 screens with music from an assembled list of performers.

== Plot ==
The story revolves around three characters — Ram Bharose, Sarabjeet, and Nimmi. Nimmi is the daughter of a bridal shop owner. Bharose works in a shop named 'Singh & Singh' and his friend Sarabjeet (aka Cyberjeet) dreams of creating another Facebook. A flashback to their school days reveals that Nimmi got pregnant by an acquaintance, and she ends up asking her close friend Bharose for help. Cyberjeet helps her by creating a fake school application for a sports tournament, which Nimmi uses as an excuse to go out of town for a night. Then Bharose poses as her husband and helps Nimmi get an abortion.

Time passes, and Bharose loses his job at Singh's shop due to a disagreement with him. During this time, Bharose's uncle has set up Bharose's marriage with his friend's daughter, Neha.

One evening Bharose and Cyberjeet are having tea at a stall where they witness a man being beaten up for eloping with his girlfriend. Upon witnessing this incident, Bharose and Cyberjeet brainstormed a website that will help needy couples to elope.

They successfully help 49 couples to elope and wait to help the 50th couple as their platinum achievement. Nimmi drops by and says that the doctor who had performed her abortion had visited her father's shop. Her father finds out about the abortion, and he decides to fix her marriage. She says that she needs Bharose's help in eloping with her friend Shunty, who had gotten her pregnant.

Bharose decides to help Nimmi and plans her escape even after repeated warnings from Cyberjeet. After everything goes according to plan, Nimmi informs Bharose that she planned to run away with Bharose and not Shunty. She admits to lying and blames Bharose for ignoring her repeatedly.

Bharose, now completely shocked, asks Nimmi to return home. She says that she has already written a letter addressing her parents, and they must be looking for her. They end up at Nimmi's aunt's house, but Nimmi's family finds her there and begins shooting at her. Nimmi gets hurt in this episode, and Bharose brings her to a hospital. After that, they travel to Dalhousie, but her family finds her when Nimmi posts her location online.

They plan to go to Patna, where Bharose's uncle lives. Bharose meets his to-be bride, Neha, in Patna. She reveals to him that she has a boyfriend and wishes to marry him, but her father is against their marriage. Bharose and team find an opportunity. They convince Neha and her boyfriend to comply with their plan to get hitched.

Finally, Neha's marriage day arrives. However, Neha's boyfriend and Cyberjeet end up at a police station. Nimmi tries to help Neha run away, but Neha's family finds her and brings her back to the mandap. Bharose goes to the bathroom and finds a man whom he had helped to elope. This man helps him with Neha's elopement.

In the end, Bharose gets tired of running along with Nimmi, and he decides to confront her family and get married with their consent.

== Cast ==
- Amit Sadh as Ram Bharose: A matric-fail migrant Bharose used to work at Singh 'n' Singh bridals as the owner's right-hand man. Being close to the family, he becomes a confidant to the owner's daughter Nimmi. Although he is illiterate, he is very smart and business minded. His background makes his character comic. He is a dependable yet impulsive lad, who despite facing rejections from his love has the desire and conviction to be with her, though he remains confused by her behaviour.
- Taapsee Pannu as Nimmi: A loud-spoken, typical Punjabi girl, who lives on her own terms. She wants to enjoy her life without boundaries. She continuously has her share of squabbles with Cyberjeet. She finds herself asking Bharose for favours as she finds him to be a very dependable guy. Her character is that of Amritsar's Patakha Queen.
- Arsh Bajwa as Sarabjeet Sidhana ('Cyberjeet'): A teenage whiz kid, who idolises Mark Zuckerberg, Bill Gates, and Steve Jobs. His life revolves around his computer and his idols. He is a street-smart computer geek who, with the help of his friend Bharose, creates a one-of-its-kind portal. Being a good friend, he is very protective of Bharose and stands with him through thick and thin.
- Saahir Banwait as Tanny: Nimmi's brother
- Shikha Malhotra as Arshi: Nimmi's best Friend
- Raaj Vishwakarma as Worker.

== Controversy ==
The film was initially named as Runningshaadi.com. However, leading matrimonial site shaadi.com sued the makers for their company's name appearing in the movie title. They appealed to Bombay High Court and asked for damage repayment worth 50 crores. Thus, the title was trimmed to Running Shaadi.

== Soundtrack ==
The music of Shoojit Sircar's films has always received high critical and commercial success. His film Vicky Donor was commercially successful, and its audio was hugely popular. The music of his films Madras Cafe and Piku is very unconventional as well.

The music from Running Shaadi has been created by an assembled team taking the feel of mixed cult. The music is by Anupam Roy, Abhishek-Akshay and Zeb and features the voices of singers like Bappi Lahiri, Papon, & Labh Janjua. The full movie soundtrack released on 27 January consists of seven songs. The music rights are bought by Junglee Music.

Track listing
No.	Title	Lyrics	Music	Singer(s)	Length
1.	"Pyar Ka Test"	Manoj Yadav	Abhishek-Akshay	Bappi Lahiri & Kalpana Patowary	3:18
2.	"Mannerless Majnu"	Manoj Yadav	Sanjeev Chimmalgi	Sukanya Purkayastha	4:06
3.	"Dimpi De Naal Bhaage Bunty"	Shellee	Abhishek-Akshay	Labh Janjua	3:36
4.	"Bhaag Milky Bhaag"	Keegan Pinto, Sonal Sehgal	Keegan Pinto	Sanam Puri & Sonu Kakkar	4:51
5.	"Faraar"	Keegan Pinto	Keegan Pinto	Jubin Nautiyal	5:58
6.	"Main Faraar Sa"	Tanveer Ghazi	Anupam Roy	Anupam Roy & Hamsika Iyer	5:01
7.	"Kuch To Hai"	Anas Ali Khan	Anjana Ankur Singh & Sandeep Madhavan	Jubin Nautiyal	3:41
