= Ishq Express =

Indian romantic drama television series

- Release poster
- Genre: Drama; Romance
- Screenplay by: Saurabh George Swamy, Anirudh Singh
- Story by: Saurabh George Swamy
- Directed by: Tanmai Rastogi, Saurabh George Swamy
- Starring: Ritvik Sahore; Gayatri Bhardwaj
- Theme music composer: Rajarshi Sanyal
- Country of origin: India
- Original language: Hindi
- No. of seasons: 1
- No. of episodes: 3

Production
- Producers: Ahab Jafri; Manvendra Singh Shekhawat; Satish Raj Kasireddi; Wasim Chisty
- Cinematography: Amit Roy
- Editor: Abhishek Gupta
- Camera setup: Multi-camera
- Running time: 30 minutes
- Production company: Lockdown Shorts Studio

Original release
- Network: Amazon miniTV
- Release: 23 June 2022

Ishq Express is an Indian Hindi-language romantic drama television series produced by Lockdown Shorts Studio. The series features Ritvik Sahore and Gayatri Bhardwaj. It premiered on Amazon miniTV on 23 June 2022.

== Plot ==
Destiny and the Indian Railways serendipitously unite a young boy named Aarav and a lovely girl Tanya for a single night when they must briefly share a berth on an overnight trip from Mumbai to Kolkata. This train journey merely marks the commencement of their tale, as it unfolds into an intriguing narrative, transforming them from strangers into lovers.

== Cast ==
- Ritvik Sahore as Aarav Agarwal
- Gayatri Bhardwaj as Tanya Basu

== Production ==
The series was announced by Lockdown Shorts Studio for Amazon miniTV. Ritvik Sahore and Gayatri Bhardwaj were signed as the lead.

== Soundtrack ==
Ishq Express

Soundtrack album by Rajarshi Sanyal
- Released: 2022
- Genre: Soundtrack
- Length: 1:33
- Language: Hindi
- Label: Sangeet Music

The music for Ishq Express is composed by Nupoor Khedkar and Rajarshi Sanyal.

Tracklisting
No.	Title	Music	Singer(s)	Length
1.	"Ek Mai Hun"	Rajarshi Sanyal	Nupoor Khedkar	1:33
Total length:				1:33

== Reception ==
Akhila Damodaran of OTTPlay rated the series 3/5 stars. Archika Khurana of Times of india rated 3.5 out of 5 and noted that "Ishq Express’ circles around a train journey that changes the lives of two young people as they meet. The way this tale is shaped up, one would not mind boarding this train and sharing the protagonist's experience."
