= Dil Dosti etc. =

- Movie poster for Dil Dosti Etc
- Directed by: Manish Tiwary
- Written by: Pawan Sony
- Produced by: Prakash Jha
- Starring: Shreyas Talpade; Nikita Anand; Imaad Shah; Smriti Mishra; Dinesh Kumar; Ishita Sharma
- Cinematography: Arvind Kumar
- Edited by: Hina Saiyada
- Music by: Siddarth; Suhas; Agnee
- Release date: 28 September 2007
- Running time: 132 minutes
- Country: India
- Language: Hindi

Dil Dosti etc. (English: Heart, Friendship, et cetera) is a 2007 Indian coming-of-age black comedy film starring Shreyas Talpade, Imaad Shah, Nikita Anand, Smriti Mishra, Ishita Sharma, and Dinesh Kumar. It was directed by Manish Tiwary and produced by Prakash Jha.

== Synopsis ==
Apurv is a rich, aimless, and cynical 18-year-old young man who has just entered college in Delhi. Juxtaposed against the aimlessness of Apurv is also the story of Sanjay Mishra, an ambitious Bihari student and politician with limited means. They represent two divergent world views—the liberal versus the conservative, the no-strings-attached versus the committed, and the elite versus the middle class. Directionless and laidback, Apurv searches for meaning in life through amorous escapades with different girls, including a sex worker Vaishali, and a schoolgirl Kintu. Meanwhile, Sanjay works single-mindedly to win the college presidential elections and yet catches the attention of a rich model, Prerna. Dil Dosti Etc. is woven together with an ensemble of other characters who have their own stories to tell. Set against all these is a silly wager that the two protagonists engage in. Sanjay will win the elections, and Apurv will manage to have sex with three women in a day. As the film moves towards a volatile climax, you get to test the film's premise; when you're young, you believe the possibilities are endless.

== Cast ==
- Imaad Shah as Apurv
- Nikita Anand as Prerna
- Smriti Mishra as Vaishali
- Ishita Sharma as Kintu
- Shreyas Talpade as Sanjay Mishra
- Dinesh Kumar as Sonu
- Soni Razdan as Apurv's mother
- Feroze Gujral as herself

== Reception ==
Martin D'Souza of Glamsham.com noted that, Minor flaws apart, college students are going to identify with this flick and I suspect there will be mass bookings in the days to come. Nikhat Kazmi of Times of India rated the movie 2 out of 5 stars and opined that, "The film's too slow and the scene's are too repetitive and you do get the feeling things aren't really going anywhere. But wait patiently, and the mood will catch up". Shubhra Gupta of The Indian Express wrote ″Jha has some of the characters down pat, particularly the Bihari sidekick of Sanjay; even, to an extent, Sanjay himself. That's because Shreyas is an earnest trier. But the director gets lost with Apoorva: maybe there are some young men who walk into college and hostel desperate to notch up numbers on their belts, but Shah is trying to be so cool and so laidback, that he doesn't really register. Neither does the film.″ Ruchi Naresh of Rediff.com called it a ″Brainless college flick.″

== Soundtrack ==
#	Title	Singer(s)	Lyricist(s)	Composer	Duration
1	"Dum Laga"	Siddharth-Suhas, Suraj Jagan, Hamza Faruqui	Raam Goutam, Prashant Pandey, Siddharth-Suhas, Kumaar	Siddharth-Suhas	04:10
2	"Lamha Ye Jayega Kahan"	K. Mohan	Prashant Pandey	Agnee	04:25
3	"Sambhalo Dil Ko"	Sunidhi Chauhan	Raam Goutam, Prashant Pandey, Siddharth-Suhas, Kumaar	Siddharth-Suhas	04:51
4	"More Banke Chhaliya"	Arati Ankalikar-Tikekar	Raam Goutam	Agnee	04:40
5	"Man Moniye"	Labh Janjua	Kumaar	Siddharth-Suhas	04:38
6	"Dum Laga - Remix"	Siddharth-Suhas, Suraj Jagan, Hamza Faruqui	Raam Goutam, Prashant Pandey, Siddharth-Suhas, Kumaar	Siddharth-Suhas	05:26
7	"Man Moniye - Remix"	Mohana Sarkar, Labh Janjua	Kumaar	Siddharth-Suhas	04:34
