= Amazon miniTV =

Streaming service in India

miniTV
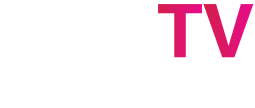
- Logo used since 2021
- Company type: Division
- Website type: OTT streaming platform
- Available in: 3 languages
- List of languages: Hindi; Tamil; Telugu
- Headquarters: Seattle, Washington, U.S.
- Country of origin: United States
- Area served: India
- Owner: Amazon
- Industry: Entertainment; mass media
- Products: Teen drama; Streaming media
- Website: www.amazon.in/minitv
- Commercial: Yes
- Registration: Required
- Launched: May 2021
- Current status: Active

Amazon miniTV, now branded as Amazon MX Player, is a free over-the-top streaming service of Amazon available in India. It is an ad-supported service. MiniTV service can be accessed from Amazon’s shopping app, on Amazon Prime Video, Fire TV, Smart TVs, or downloaded from Play Store.

== History ==
The service debuted in May 2021.

== Content ==
=== Original programming ===
Many drama series were streamed on Mini TV like:

- Hunter Tootega Nahi Todega (2023)
- Half CA (2023)
- Highway Love (2023)
- Ishq Express (2022)
- Gutar Gu (2023)
- Amber Girls School (2024–present)
- Sisterhood (2024–present)
