= Sanjeev Chimmalgi =

Indian singer

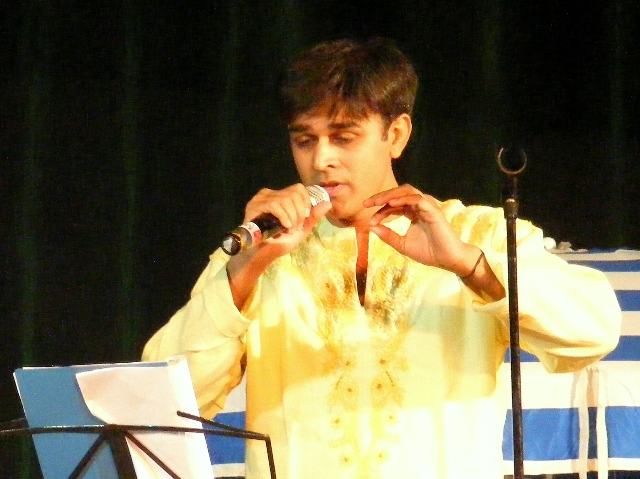

Background information
- Born: 29 July 1972 (age 53); Dharwad, Karnataka, India
- Genres: Hindustani classical music
- Instrument: vocals

Pandit Sanjeev Chimmalgi (born 29 July 1972) is an Indian music composer and Hindustani vocalist. He is a disciple of C. R. Vyas. His music reflects the voice culture of Kirana gharana as well as the bandish oriented singing of the Gwalior gharana/ Agra gharana.

== Background ==
Chimmalgi was born in Mumbai to M.V. Chimmalgi, in a family hailing from Dharwad, Karnataka. His grandfather, Chimmalgi Master, was a noted tabla player.

== Career ==
Chimmalgi is professionally trained as a computer engineer. He had his initial training from Madhava Gudi. Later he came under the tutelage of C. R. Vyas. He is also receiving training in Carnatic music under T. R. Balamani and Balachandran in Mumbai and in Konnakol under renowned Mridangam player T. S. Nandakumar.

He has performed at several venues in Mumbai, Pune, Indore, Kolkata, Miraj, and Nagpur.

== Discography ==
- Quest (2003)
- Remembering Gunijaan: A Tribute to Pandit C R Vyas (2008)
- Runningshaadi.com
- Baahubali 2
- Hindi Medium

== Awards and recognition ==
- 2007 - Best male playback singing for the Marathi film 'Aai Shappath'.
- 2006 - Nominated for Zee Gaurav Puraskar, V Shantaram Puraskar and Maharashtra Shasan Puraskar
- 2005-2006 - Sangeetha Shiromani Award consisting of a citation and Rs 25,000/- cash.
- 1995 to 98 - Awarded the National scholarship by the Government of India.
- 1993 - Winner of all India youth under-23 competition conducted by All India Radio.
