= Issaq =

2013 Hindi romantic film directed by Manish Tiwary

- Theatrical Official Poster
- Directed by: Manish Tiwary
- Written by: Padmaja Thakore-Tiwary; Manish Tiwary; Pawan Sony
- Produced by: Dhaval Gada; Shailesh R Singh
- Starring: Prateik Babbar; Amyra Dastur; Ravi Kishan; Makarand Deshpande; Neena Gupta; Prashant Narayanan; Sudhir Pandey; Prashant Kumar; Amit Sial; Vineet Kumar Singh; Yuri Suri; Malini Awasthi
- Cinematography: Vishal Sinha
- Music by: Songs: Sachin–Jigar; Sachin Gupta; Krsna; Background score: Prashant Pillai
- Production company: Pen Studios
- Release date: 26 July 2013
- Country: India
- Language: Hindi
- Budget: ₹ 250 million
- Box office: ₹ 53.7 million

Issaq (transl. Love) is a 2013 Indian Hindi-language romantic film directed by Manish Tiwary and produced by Dhaval Gada and Shailesh R. Singh. The film, written by Padmaja Thakore-Tiwary, Manish Tiwary and Pawan Sony, was released on 26 July 2013. The film stars Prateik Babbar, Amyra Dastur, Rajeshwari Sachdev, Ravi Kishan and Makarand Deshpande as main characters. According to BoxOfficeIndia.com, the film was a box office disaster.

== Plot ==
This is the story based on two land mafias of Banaras: Kashyaps and Mishras. They have a throat-cutting competition to gain control over the land and fight brutally over it.

== Cast ==
- Prateik Babbar as Rahul Mishra (Romeo)
- Amyra Dastur as Bachchi Kashyap (Juliet)
- Ravi Kishan as Teeta Singh (Tybalt)
- Rajeshwari Sachdev as Paro Kashyap, Bachchi's step- (Lady Capulet)
- Makarand Deshpande as Baba (Friar Laurence)
- Neena Gupta as Amma (Nurse)
- Prashant Narayanan as Naxal leader
- Sudhir Pandey as Vishwanarayan Kashyap, Bachchi's (Capulet)
- Sandeep Bose as Manohar Mishra, Rahul's (Montague)
- Prashantt Guptha as Preetam (Paris)
- Amit Sial as Murari (Mercutio)
- Vineet Kumar Singh as Bihata (Benvolio)
- Yogesh Suri as Prince
- Malini Awasthi as Manorama
- Evelyn Sharma as Roza (Rosaline)
- Yuri Suri as Minister
- Akhilesh Jha as Mahender
- Saurabh Yadav as Paras
- Mehdi as Nandkishore
- Ishtiyak Khan as Reporter
- Parvez Fazal Khan as Surta
- Pradeep Ghosh as Mishrilal

== Marketing ==
The film was promoted in TV serial Amita Ka Amit. The producers promoted the movie through Banarasi paan at the leading malls in Mumbai.

== Soundtrack ==
Sachin–Jigar composed the songs while the background score was composed by Prashant Pillai.

Issaq

Soundtrack album by Sachin–Jigar
- Released: 22 June 2013
- Genre: Film soundtrack
- Label: Zee Music Company
- Producer: Shailesh R Singh

Sachin–Jigar chronology
Ramaiya Vastavaiya (2013)	Issaq (2013)	Shuddh Desi Romance (2013)

=== Track list ===
No.	Title	Lyrics	Music	Singer(s)	Length
1.	"Issaq Tera"	Mayur Puri	Sachin–Jigar	Mohit Chauhan	3:16
2.	"Issaq Tera (Duet)"	Mayur Puri	Sachin – Jigar	Mohit Chauhan, Smita Jain	2:12
3.	"Jheeni Re Jheeni"	Neelesh Misra	Sachin – Jigar	Rashid Khan, Pratibha Baghel, Additional Vocals: Arijit Singh	7:25
4.	"Bhole Chale"	Anil Pandey	Sachin Gupta	Rahul Ram	4:26
5.	"Aag Ka Dariya"	Anil Pandey	Sachin Gupta	Ankit Tiwari	4:51
6.	"Enne Unne"	Raj Shekhar	Krsna	Keerthi Sagathia, Mamta Sharma, Tarun Sagar, Papon	4:21
7.	"Aag Ka Dariya (Unplugged)"	Anil Pandey	Sachin Gupta	Sachin Gupta	3:47
8.	"Bhagan Ke Rekhan Ki"	Anil Pandey	Krsna	Raghubir Yadav, Malini Awasthi	5:19
9.	"Issaq Tera - Female"	Mayur Puri	Sachin – Jigar	Smita Jain	3:05

== Critical response ==
The movie received generally negative reviews. Piyasree Dasgupta, in a review for Firstpost, summed it up as: "One wonders … what is a greater tragedy—Romeo and Juliet or what Issaq made of that classic love story." Shubhra Gupta of The Indian Express find it to be "without a singular voice of its own" and that ultimately "it drowns in its own noise." The review in The Times of India calls out the poor acting by Babbar and Dastur's lack of charisma. "Manish Tiwary's Issaq lacks vibe, soul or depth needed for a classic love story. With incoherent narrative, unsketched characters, wispy (sometimes embarrassing) dialogues, one good melody in the whole ditty (Issaq tera); pointless shooting (mostly in the dark), gold-plated bandooks and bombs galore—Tiwary misses every target. There are movies beautifully adapted from Shakespeare's works in the past, but none that tragically assault your creative, poetic or cinematic senses." Sarit Ray, writing for the Hindustan Times, thinks "seldom have [Shakespeare movie adaptations] been associated with as nonsensical a mess as Manish Tiwary's Issaq" and that "It's a pity that Issaq joins remarkable films like Maqbool, Omkara and Angoor on the list of Bollywood adaptations of Shakespeare. In a time when works of literature are judged by their TV and film versions, it could even give the Bard a bit of a bad rep."
