= Anamika (2022 TV series) =

- Genre: Crime, Thriller, Action
- Written by: Shweta Bothra
- Directed by: Vikram Bhatt
- Starring: Sunny Leone; Rahul Dev; Sonnalli Seygall; Samir Soni; Ayaz Khan; Shehzad Shaikh; Romil K. Sharma
- Country of origin: India
- Original languages: Hindi; Tamil; Telugu; Malayalam; Kannada; Marathi; Bengali
- No. of seasons: 1
- No. of episodes: 8

Production
- Producers: Krishna Bhatt; Vikram Bhatt
- Camera setup: Multi-camera
- Running time: 25
- Production company: Loneranger Productions

Original release
- Network: MX Player
- Release: 10 March 2022

Anamika is a 2022 Hindi-language streaming television series directed by Vikram Bhatt and written by Shweta Bothra. It stars Sunny Leone, Rahul Dev, Sonnalli Seygall, Samir Soni, Shehzad Shaikh, Ayaz Khan, Romil K. Sharma. The series is also available in Tamil, Telugu, Malayalam, Kannada, Marathi and Bengali languages in dubbed version. The series is OTT debut of Sunny Leone in her acting career.

== Cast ==
- Sunny Leone as Anamika
- Rahul Dev as Ravi Shrivastav
- Ayaz Khan as Dr. Prashant
- Sonnalli Seygall as Rhea
- Samir Soni as Sameer Oberoi
- Randheer Rai As Walia Saab
- Susheel Parashar as Raghunath Chouhan
- Libert Olivera as Police chief
- Rajesh Desai as Hafiz
- Garrvil Mohan as Ansari
- Manish Kapoor as Hotel manager
- Abhishek Sharma as Khurana
- Puneet Tejwani as Desai
- Gourav Singh as Kappor
- Shehzad Shaikh as Rohan
- Romil K. Sharma as Pradeep

== Plot ==
Anamika (Sunny Leone), who lost her memories in a dramatic situation, continues her fights and revenges without knowing her past that she was a spy cop.

== Release ==
The official trailer of Anamika was released on 1 March 2022. The web series was released on MX Player on 10 March 2022.

== Reception ==
Archika Khurana of The Times of India rated 3 out of 5 stars and wrote "Sunny Leone in and as Anamika engages the viewers in the thrilling encounters with the mafia and DTA Agents who are after her. One can really sit back and enjoy the action. Her training in a variety of combat (a combination of martial arts forms) is evident, especially in her movements and body language."

Udita Jhunjhunwala for Firstpost wrote "The supporting actors range from caricatures (Ansari, an expletive spewing drug dealer dressed in all-white) to deadpan (Shrivastav) to slightly camp (Sameer Soni as businessman Sameer Oberoi)."

Priyakshi Sharma of Pinkvilla wrote "It should be definitely noted that Sunny Leone is cast in a never-seen-before action avatar. She’s knocking down men with guns with ferocity. In Anamika, she is not reduced to being an object of the male gaze, but she’s someone with a complex history, a troubled past, and a conflict with her own mind, and that’s a great start to break free of being typecast."

Reviewing the web series Binged wrote "The climax, like most of the story before offers twists. They don’t have an impact, and some we can see them coming miles away."
