= Manish Tiwary =

Indian film director and screenwriter (born 1972)

- Born: Manish Tiwary; 5 September 1972 (age 53); Bihar, India
- Education: Hindu College, University of Delhi; Cambridge University; Yale University
- Occupations: Film director, screenwriter
- Years active: 2007–present

Manish Tiwary is an Indian film director and screenwriter. He has directed and written films like Issaq and Dil Dosti Etc.

== Early life and career ==
Manish completed his school education from Sainik School Tilaiya, a boarding school in a small town in Jharkhand. Manish Tiwary studied Zoology at Hindu College in Delhi University. Manish later got postgraduate education at Cambridge University, UK, and Yale University, USA. Manish worked for the Food and Agriculture Organization of the United Nations in Rome, Nepal and India and has published articles concerning political ecology in the Economic and Political Weekly of India. His monograph titled, Participatory Forest Policies and Politics in India: Joint Forest Management Institutions in Jharkhand and West Bengal was published by Ashgate, UK.

== Bollywood ==
Manish directed two films, Dil Dosti Etc and Issaq, in a gap of six years.

== Filmography ==
- Dil Dosti Etc (2007)
- Issaq (2013)
- Chidiakhana (2023)
