= MX Player =

Indian video streaming platform

Amazon MX Player
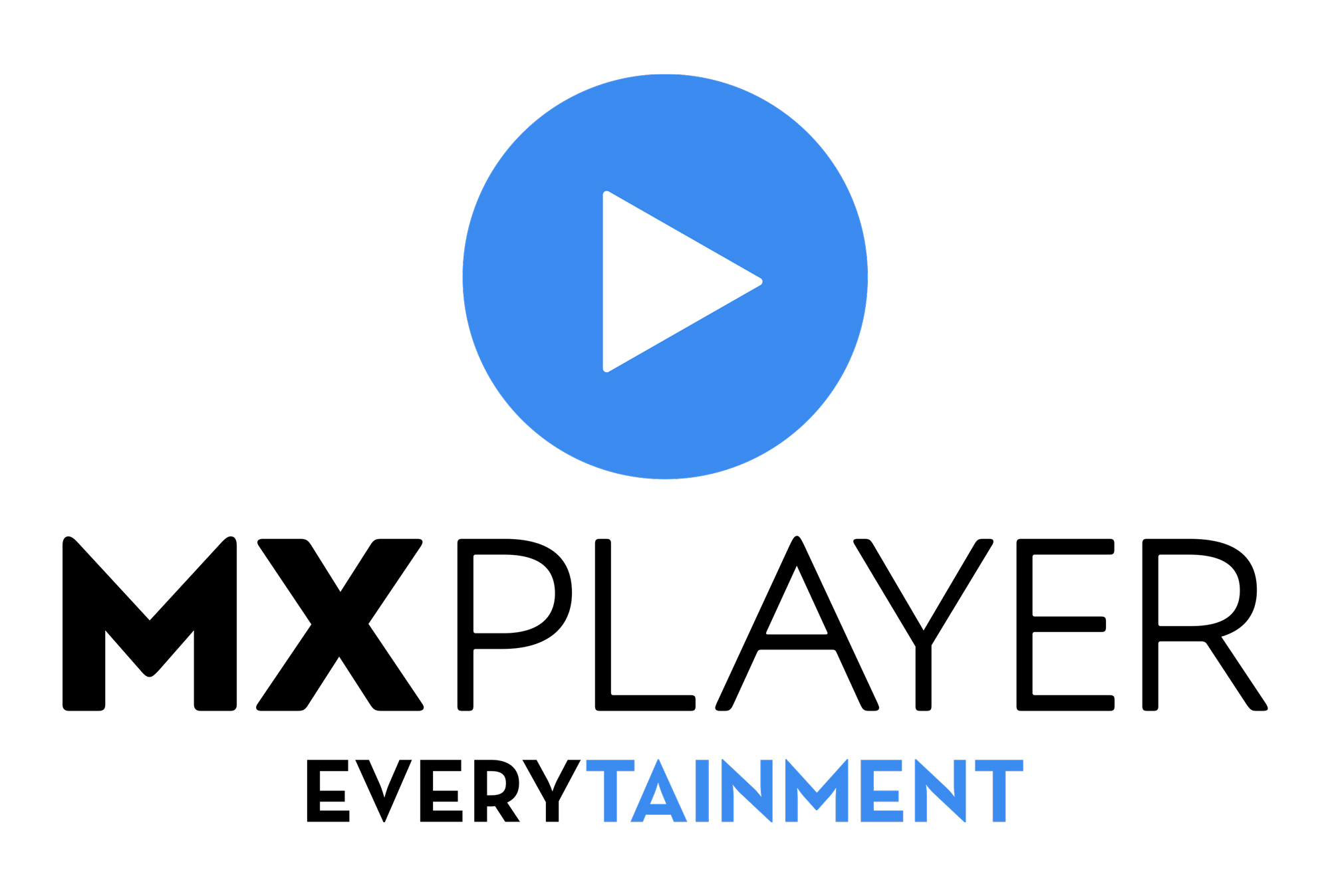
- Screenshot
- Former name: MX Player (2011–2024)
- Company type: Public
- Website type: Video On Demand; OTT platform
- Available in: 11 languages
- List of languages Bengali, Bhojpuri, Tamil, English, Gujarati, Hindi, Kannada, Malayalam, Marathi, Punjabi, Telugu
- Headquarters: Mumbai, India
- Area served: As an application: Worldwide; As an OTT service: Only in India
- Owners: Amazon India (2024–present); Times Internet (2018–2024); Tencent (2011–2018)
- Key people: Karan Bedi (CEO); Abhishek Joshi (SVP & Head of Marketing and Business partnerships); Nikhil Gandhi (COO); Gautam Talwar (CCO)
- Website: www.mxplayer.in
- Launched: As a video player: 18 July 2011; 15 years ago Relaunch as an OTT platform: 20 February 2019; 7 years ago
- Current status: Active

Amazon MX Player, formerly known as MX Player is an Indian video on demand and over-the-top streaming service, owned by Amazon India. The platform currently operates on an ad-supported model.

== History ==
MX Player was launched as a video player for Android on 18 July 2011 by J2 Interactive. It featured subtitle support and offline video viewing capabilities.

On 20 February 2019, MX Player was relaunched as an OTT platform with original programming. It also licensed content from various Indian and International studios including FilmRise, Sonar Entertainment, Screen Media Films, Goldmines Telefilms, Hungama, Shemaroo, Paramount Pictures, Sony Entertainment and Sun TV Network. In 2020, it tied up with Ullu App for adult content.

Initially available only in India, in March 2020, MX Player announced the launch of its OTT service internationally to selected markets, including the United States, United Kingdom, Australia, New Zealand, Pakistan, Bangladesh and Nepal. Elsewhere, it is still a video player.

In February 2023, it was reported that Amazon, which also owns and operates Prime Video and Freevee, was in talks to acquire MX Player as part of a broader effort to expand its presence in the Indian entertainment market.

Amazon acquired the company in June 2024 for $100 million.

== List of original shows ==
Year	Title	Genre(s)	Premiere	Seasons / Episodes	Language(s)	
Year	Title	Genre(s)	Premiere	Seasons / Episodes	Original	Dub
2019	Famously Filmfare Season 2 (Bollywood)	Talk Show	19 February 2019	1 Season, 10 Episodes	Hindi	
2019	Famously Filmfare (Tollywood)	Talk Show	19 February 2019	1 Season, 10 Episodes	Telugu	
2019	Famously Filmfare (Kollywood)	Talk Show	19 February 2019	1 Season, 5 Episodes	Tamil	
2019	Famously Filmfare (Sandalwood)	Talk Show	19 February 2019	1 Season, 6 Episodes	Kannada	
2019	Famously Filmfare (Mollywood)	Talk Show	19 February 2019	1 Season, 6 Episodes	Malayalam	
2019	Famously Filmfare (Bengali)	Talk Show	19 February 2019	1 Season, 11 Episodes	Bengali	
2019	Famously Filmfare (Punjabi)	Talk Show	19 February 2019	1 Season, 10 Episodes	Punjabi	
2019	Famously Filmfare (Marathi)	Talk Show	19 February 2019	1 Season, 12 Episodes	Marathi	
2019	Aafat	Comedy, Drama	19 February 2019	1 Season, 6 Episodes	Hindi	
2019	F Buddies	Romance	25 March 2019	1 Season, 8 Episodes	Tamil / English	Telugu, Hindi
2019	Love Ok Please	Travel Reality Show	25 March 2019	1 Season, 14 Episodes		
2019	Kiski Sarkar	Comedy	15 April 2019	1 Season, 5 Episodes	Hindi	
2019	Express Yourself	Music	26 April 2019	1 Season, 4 Episodes	Hindi	
2019	Bollywood Buzzinga S1	Game Show	4 May 2019	1 Season, 10 Episodes	Hindi	
2019	Thinkistan	Drama	24 May 2019	1 Season, 23 Episodes	Hindi	
2019	Aani Kay Hava	Romantic Comedy	28 June 2019	2 Seasons, 12 Episodes	Marathi	Hindi
2019	Bollywood Buzzinga S2	Game Show	16 August 2019	2 Seasons, 26 Episodes	Hindi	
2019	Once A Year	Romance	20 September 2019	1 Season, 6 Episodes	Marathi	
2019	Pandu	Comedy	20 September 2019	1 Season, 6 Episodes	Marathi	
2019	Hello Mini	Thriller	1 October 2019	3 Season, 35 Episodes	Hindi	
2019	Shaadi Fit	Reality	15 November 2019	1 Season, 11 Episodes	Hindi	
2019	Hey Prabhu!	Comedy, Drama	14 November 2019	1 Season, 6 Episodes	Hindi	Tamil
2019	Cheesecake	Drama	29 November 2019	1 Season, 5 Episodes	Hindi	
2019	Queen	Historical Drama	14 December 2019	1 season, 11 episodes	Tamil	Telugu, Hindi, Bengali
2019	The Untamed	Historical, Drama, LGBT, Mysteries	Adapted from : Mo Dao Zu Shi	50 Episodes	Chinese	Hindi
2020	Pawan & Pooja	Romance, Drama	14 February 2020	1 Season, 10 Episodes	Hindi	Telugu, Tamil
2020	Ek Thi Begum	Action, Thriller	15 April 2020	1 Season, 10 Episodes	Marathi	Hindi
2020	Bhaukaal	Drama, Action	6 March 2020	2 Season, 20 Episodes	Hindi	Telugu, Tamil
2020	Samantar	Suspense, Drama	13 March 2020	1 Season, 9 Episodes	Marathi	Hindi, Telugu and Tamil
2020	Mastram	Comedy, Fantasy	30 April 2020	1 Season, 10 Episodes	Hindi	Telugu, Tamil
2020	Raktanchal	Crime	28 May 2020	1 Season, 9 Episodes	Hindi	Telugu
2020	Times of Music	Music, Reality Show	20 June 2020	1 Season, 11 Episodes	Hindi	
2020	Dangerous	Crime, Drama	14 August 2020	1 Season, 7 Episodes	Hindi	Telugu, Tamil
2020	Aashram	Crime, Drama	28 August 2020	3 Seasons, 28 Episodes	Hindi	Telugu, Tamil
2020	Basement Company	Web Series	19 February 2020	1 Season, 5 Episodes	Hindi	
2020	High	Crime	7 October 2020	1 Season	Hindi	
2020	Bullets	Action	30 October 2020	1 Season	Hindi	Telugu, Tamil
2020	Beehad Ka Baghi	Crime	27 November 2020	1 season,5 Episodes	Hindi	
2020	Pati Patni Aur Panga	Romance, Drama	12 December 2020	1 Season	Hindi	Telugu, Tamil
2020	The Missing Stone	Horror	25 December 2020	1 season, 5 episodes	Hindi	
2021	Chakravyuh – An Inspector Virkar Crime Thriller	Crime, Thriller	12 March 2021	1 Season, 8 Episodes	Hindi	Telugu
2021	Bisaat	Mystery, Thriller	15 April 2021	1 season, 8 episodes	Hindi	
2021	Indori Ishq	Romantic Comedy	10 June 2021	1 season, 9 episodes	Hindi	
2021	Chhatrasal	Historical Drama, War	29 July 2021	1 Season, 20 Episodes	Hindi	
2021	Nakaab	Crime, Thriller	12 September 2021	1 season, 8 episodes	Hindi	Marathi, Tamil, Telugu
2021	Sanak Ek Junoon	Thriller	16 October 2021	1 season 8 episodes	Hindi	
2021	Matsya Kaand	Crime Thriller	18 November 2021	1 season	Hindi	Punjabi, Tamil, Telugu
2022	Campus Diaries	Comedy	7 January 2022	1 Season	Hindi	
2022	Anamika	Action, Thriller	10 March 2022	1 season, 8 episodes	Hindi	Malayalam, Tamil, Telugu, Kannada, Bengali, Marathi
2022	Roohaniyat	Romance, Mystery, Thriller, Family	23 March 2022	2 Seasons, 40 Episodes	Hindi	
2022	Miya, Biwi aur Murder	Crime, Thriller	1 July 2022	1 season, 9 episodes	Hindi	
2022	Shiksha Mandal	Crime, Drama	9 September 2022	1 season	Hindi	
2022	Tu Zakhm Hai	Romantic, Thriller	15 October 2022	1 season	Hindi	
2023	Tinders	Romance, Drama, Web Series	27 March 2023	1 season	Hindi	
2024	Jamnapaar	Drama, Comedy	24 May 2024	2 seasons, 20 episodes	Hindi	
2024	Party Till I Die	Romance, Drama	24 December 2024	1 season, 6 episodes	Hindi	
2025	Loot Kaand	Action, Drama	20 March 2025	1 season, 6 episodes	Hindi	
2025	First Copy	Comedy, Drama	20 June 2025	2 seasons, 20 episodes	Hindi	
2025	Bindiya Ke Bahubali (TV series)	Action Comedy Drama	08 August 2025	2 season, 12 episodes	Hindi	
2025	Co-Ed	Comedy, Drama	20 November 2025	1 season, 6 episodes	Hindi	
2025	Aukaat Ke Bahar	Romantic Comedy	3 December 2025	1 season, 15 episodes	Hindi	
2025	Bhay: The Gaurav Tiwari Mystery	Paranormal	12 December 2025	1 season, 8 episodes	Hindi	
2026	Psycho Saiyaan	Romantic thriller	25 February 2026	1 season, 6 episodes	Hindi	
2026	Sankalp	Crime drama	11 March 2026	1 season, 10 episodes	Hindi	
2026	Kaptaan	Crime drama	3 April 2026	1 season, 8 episodes	Hindi	
2026	Vimal Khanna	Crime thriller	15 May 2026	1 season, 9 episodes	Hindi	
2026	Made In India: A Titan Story	Biographical drama	3 June 2026	1 season, 6 episodes	Hindi	
2026	Waiting Hai	Crime drama	16 September 2026	1 season, 7 episodes	Hindi	
2026	Ishqa Ishqa	Romantic Psychological Thriller	07 October 2026	1 season, 30 episodes	Hindi	

== MX TakaTak ==
In July 2020, MX Player launched the short video app MX TakaTak. As of 24 March 2021, the app had more than 100 million active users. In 2022, it has been acquired by ShareChat, which also owns the competitor Moj.
