= Idli Kadai =

2025 Indian Tamil film by Dhanush

- Theatrical release poster
- Directed by: Dhanush
- Written by: Dhanush
- Produced by: Aakash Baskaran; Dhanush
- Starring: Dhanush; Arun Vijay; Sathyaraj; P. Samuthirakani; Nithya Menen; Shalini Pandey; Rajkiran; R. Parthiban
- Cinematography: Kiran Koushik
- Edited by: Prasanna GK
- Music by: G. V. Prakash Kumar
- Production companies: Wunderbar Films; Dawn Pictures
- Distributed by: Red Giant Movies
- Release date: 1 October 2025
- Running time: 147 minutes
- Country: India
- Language: Tamil
- Budget: est. ₹70-104 crore
- Box office: est. ₹71.32 crore

Idli Kadai (transl. Idli Shop) is a 2025 Indian Tamil-language action drama film written, directed and co-produced by Dhanush under Wunderbar Films, in association with Dawn Pictures. The film stars Dhanush, leading an ensemble cast that includes Arun Vijay, Sathyaraj, P. Samuthirakani, Nithya Menen, Shalini Pandey, Rajkiran and R. Parthiban.

The film was officially announced in September 2024. Principal photography began the same month. It was shot primarily in Theni district, before wrapping by late April 2025. The film has music composed by G. V. Prakash Kumar, cinematography handled by Kiran Koushik and editing by Prasanna GK.

Idli Kadai was released in theatres worldwide on 1 October 2025.

== Plot ==
Sivanesan owns a humble but well-respected idli shop in a small village in Theni. His son Murugan grows up observing his father's disciplined routine of waking at 3 a.m., praying and preparing idlis renowned throughout the community. Sivanesan's wife, Kasturi, lovingly supports the family. However, Murugan dreams of a better life and eventually leaves for Madras to pursue a higher-paying career, as his father resists change and progress.

Years later, Murugan becomes a successful executive at a restaurant company owned by Vishnu Varadhan. He is engaged to Vishnu's daughter, Meera, with their wedding scheduled in 15 days. However, tensions arise with Meera's brother Ashwin, an impulsive and overprotective troublemaker who smokes, gambles and boxes. Ashwin resents Murugan's innocence and the admiration his father shows him. Vishnu explains that he has indulged Ashwin since the death of his wife, hoping to help his son overcome his trauma.

During the engagement, Murugan learns that Sivanesan has died. Accompanied by his colleague Ramarajan, he returns to the village to perform the final rites, despite pressure to attend his wedding because of its importance and the presence of VIP guests. There, he reunites with Kayal, his former high school sweetheart, who resents him for abandoning his parents. Meanwhile, the family's cow gives birth to a calf, named Sivam. Kasturi struggles with her husband's death and experiences flashbacks to her younger days when visiting the parotta shop. Overcome by grief, she eventually dies.

Murugan is offered ₹7 lakh (US$7,300) by Marisami, a powerful local parotta shop owner who wishes to marry Kayal and has long rivalled Sivanesan. Although Murugan considers selling the idli shop, he changes his mind after discovering the truth behind the feud. He attempts to run the business using his father's methods but fails to reproduce the signature idlis, causing customers to dwindle. Desperate, he dreams of Sivanesan, who reassures him and inspires him to embrace his father's daily rituals, attire and cooking techniques. Murugan follows his advice, successfully recreates the idlis and restores the shop's popularity.

Murugan's decision to cancel his wedding angers Meera, Ashwin and Vishnu. Ashwin confronts him in a fight but is defeated, intensifying his hatred and desire for revenge. Murugan nevertheless remains committed to his father's principles of peace and non-violence. Ashwin later ambushes and shoots him, leaving him critically injured. Murugan survives but refuses to identify his attacker, claiming not to know who shot him and further frustrating Ashwin.

Meanwhile, Marisami asks for Kayal's hand in marriage, but she and her mother reject him, declaring that she will marry Murugan. Enraged, Marisami attempts to kill Sivam. Murugan intervenes but is ultimately humbled in the confrontation. Later, Ashwin sets fire to the idli shop, destroying the business built by Murugan's parents and devastating him.

Meera learns of the fire and confronts Ashwin, threatening to shoot herself, while Vishnu attempts to restrain her. When Ashwin continues to insult Murugan, Vishnu finally rebukes and slaps him. Despite his suffering, Murugan refuses to resort to violence. Instead, he salvages his parents' appliances and cooking equipment and resolves to rebuild the shop with Kayal's help.

Ramarajan remains with Murugan's family to help run the business. Ashwin eventually reconciles with Murugan and apologises, while Meera accepts his decision. Vishnu, Meera and Ashwin are invited to taste Murugan's idlis. At their playful request, Murugan gives Ashwin a minor punishment by making him stir the idli batter, an exhausting task that leaves him sweating and amuses everyone.

The film concludes with Murugan and Kayal successfully rebuilding the shop. The village once again enjoys its beloved idlis, celebrating the enduring love, traditions and values passed down by Sivanesan and Kasturi.

== Cast ==
- Dhanush as Murugan Sivanesan
- Arun Vijay as Ashwin
- Sathyaraj as Vishnu Varathan
- P. Samuthirakani as Marisamy
- Nithya Menen as Kayal
- Shalini Pandey as Meera
- Rajkiran as Sivanesan
- R. Parthiban as Inspector R. Arivu
- Vadivukkarasi as Murugan's grandmother
- Ilavarasu as Ramarajan
- Aadukalam Naren as Vishnu Varadhan's PA
- Geetha Kailasam as Kasturi
  - Brigida Saga as young Kasturi
- Indhumathi Manikandan as Kayal's mother

== Production ==
=== Development ===
On 17 September 2024, the newly established production house Dawn Pictures, headed by Aakash Baskaran, officially announced through their social media pages their maiden production project. Tentatively titled D52 or DD4, it would be directed by and star Dhanush, in his fourth directorial venture. Dhanush would also co-produce the project under Wunderbar Films. The film's official title, Idli Kadai, was announced on 19 September 2024. The technical crew includes composer G. V. Prakash Kumar, editor Prasanna GK and cinematographer Kiran Koushik. In September 2025, Dhanush claimed the film was inspired by his fondness for idlis during his childhood, at a time he allegedly could not afford to buy the same.

=== Casting ===
Shortly after the film's announcement, reports surfaced that Ashok Selvan would play an important role, but the actor denied his participation. Nithya Menen, who previously won the National Film Award for Best Actress in a Leading Role for the Dhanush starrer Thiruchitrambalam (2022), told journalist Subhash K. Jha in August 2024 that she would collaborate with Dhanush again for an undisclosed film. She officially confirmed her involvement in Idli Kadai the following October, and stated that she is stepping out of her comfort zone for her character. Shalini Pandey accepted to act in the film as it was her long-time desire to collaborate with Dhanush. It marks her return to Tamil cinema after Gorilla (2019).

P. Samuthirakani was cast after a single phone call with Dhanush, and began filming 10 days later. Arun Vijay agreed to join the cast after Dhanush told him the entire script in 45 minutes. An early poster revealed he would play a boxer. Arun, who primarily plays lead roles, said it was his long time desire to play an antagonist like he did in Yennai Arindhaal (2015) and accepted Idli Kadai as he trusted Dhanush. He would reportedly receive ₹80 million (US$830,000), way higher than his usual remuneration. R. Parthiban, who was earlier supposed to act with Dhanush in Aadukalam (2011) and the shelved Soodhadi, instantly accepted his offer to appear in Idli Kadai. Dhanush's maternal grandmother made a cameo appearance in the film.

=== Filming ===
Principal photography commenced with the first schedule on 16 September 2024 at the villages of Theni district in Tamil Nadu. Filming for the first schedule was held in Theni for a month. By mid-October, the team moved to Pollachi for a brief schedule. As of March 2025, filming was mostly complete, with only a song sequence left to be shot in an overseas location. In mid-April, the team, including Arun, Parthiban and Sathyaraj left to Bangkok for the final schedule. On 20 April 2025, a major fire broke out on the street-like sets erected in Anupapatti village near Andipatti, with no casualties or injuries reported. During the filming of a fight sequence, a mistimed punch by Dhanush led to Arun bleeding, but the actor quickly returned to filming after applying ice near his mouth. Filming wrapped on 26 April 2025.

== Music ==
The music and background score were composed by G. V. Prakash Kumar. The audio rights were acquired by Saregama. The first single, "Enna Sugam" was released on 27 July 2025, Dhanush's birthday. The second single, "Enjaami Thandhaane", was released on 27 August, Ganesh Chaturthi. The audio launch took place on 14 September. The third single, "Yen Paattan Saami Varum", was released on 17 September. The complete album consisting of six tracks was released on 25 September.

== Marketing ==
Promotional campaigns for the film began in mid-August, with the film's posters being branded in popcorn buckets at selected multiplexes across Tamil Nadu. Furthermore, 3D standees and posters were branded across select hoardings, buses, autos, malls and theatres, across Chennai and parts of Tamil Nadu. The trailer for Idli Kadai was released on 20 September 2025 at the Prozone Mall, Coimbatore. Pre-release events were held at the Raja Muthaiah Mandram in Madurai on 24 September, and at Morais City in Tiruchirappalli on 25 September. The team also collaborated with Zepto, with the film's posters branded on Zepto delivery bags.

== Release ==
=== Theatrical ===
The film was initially scheduled to be released in theatres on 10 April 2025 during the week of Puthandu (Tamil New Year), but was removed from that date in March 2025 as filming was not complete by then. On 4 April 2025, the makers announced a new release date of 1 October 2025. The film was released in Telugu as Idli Kottu.

=== Distribution ===
The distribution rights for Tamil Nadu were acquired by Red Giant Movies. The theatrical rights in the Telugu states were acquired by Sri Vedakshara Movies. Phars Film acquired the overseas theatrical rights for ₹120 million (US$1.2 million). Ahimsa Entertainment and Boleyn Cinemas acquired the United Kingdom theatrical rights. Malik Streams Corporation acquired the Malaysia theatrical rights.

=== Home media ===
The film began streaming on Netflix from 29 October 2025.

== Reception ==
=== Critical response ===
Sajin Shrijith of The Week gave 3.5/5 stars and wrote, "Idly Kadai doesn't breathe the same air as what passes for "new wave" cinema these days. It's decidedly more "old-school" than [Dhanush's] previous directorials". Arjun Menon of The Indian Express gave 3.5/5 stars and wrote, "The payoffs are too stale and the setups are too lazy to fetch any results, where the obvious goodness of the hero is exemplified and the villains are put down as ghastly, clueless monsters. Idli Kadai is not that kind of a film, it just thinks it can be that".

M. Suganth of The Times of India gave 2.5/5 stars and wrote, "what's hard to shake off is the feeling that given his talents, Dhanush should be more ambitious as a storyteller and not be content with just being a nostalgia merchant". Janani K of India Today gave 2/5 stars and wrote, "Despite all its good intentions, Idli Kadai ends up being a predictable affair with minimal surprises and innovation". Avinash Ramachandran of Cinema Express gave 2.5/5 stars and wrote, "Even if it makes you roll your eyes for a while, it somehow manages to get you back to the fuzzy zone. Just like the good ol' idlis... soft, warm, and comfortable, even if sometimes, they need better sides".

Rajasekar S of The Federal wrote, "Idli Kadai is a heartfelt rural drama that soars in its emotionally resonant first half, powered by stellar performances from Dhanush, Rajkiran, and Nithya Menen. While the second half succumbs to clichés, the film's sincerity, strong music, and tender climax make it a worthwhile watch. It serves as a gentle reminder to cherish one's roots and the simple joys of life even if it doesn't always break new ground". Bhuvanesh Chandar of The Hindu wrote, "Idli Kadai never promises to redefine the template. After NEEK, Dhanush seems to have dug deeper, perhaps wishing to taste the pleasures of a comfort meal, and this film is just that. It wishes to make you forget about fancy restaurant meals and remind you of a flavour you might have forgotten about, soothe you with its familiarity and leave you with a full heart. It's just good 'ol, soft and fluffy idlis after all. You just need the right ingredients, and that intangible something from the chef.

=== Box office ===
According to trade analysts, Idli Kadai grossed ₹21 crore (equivalent to ₹22 crore or US$2.3 million in 2026) in the first two days of release. By 12 October, the film had reportedly grossed ₹45 crore (equivalent to ₹46 crore or US$4.8 million in 2026), and Dinamani believed it was unlikely to succeed given the alleged ₹70 crore (equivalent to ₹72 crore or US$7.5 million in 2026) budget, and the release of Kantara: Chapter 1 was also expected to affect the film's performance. In Malaysia, Idli Kadai opened at second place, ahead of Kantara: Chapter 1, before dropping to ninth place in its second week. While Kantara: Chapter 1 climbed to sixth place and remained in the top ten for a further two weeks, Idli Kadai concluded its theatrical run by the end of its second week.
