= Masoom (TV series) =

- Genre: Psychological Thriller
- Created by: Gurmeet Singh
- Based on: Blood by Sophie Petzal
- Screenplay by: Ginny Diwan
- Directed by: Mihir Desai
- Starring: Boman Irani; Samara Tijori; Upasana Singh; Manjari Phadnis; Saariika Singh; Veer Rajwant Singh; Manu Rishi
- Country of origin: India
- Original languages: Hindi; Punjabi
- No. of seasons: 1

Production
- Producer: Namit Sharma
- Cinematography: Vivek Shah
- Editor: Mannan Mehta
- Camera setup: Multi-camera
- Production company: Reliance Entertainment

Original release
- Network: Disney+ Hotstar
- Release: 17 June 2022

Masoom is an Indian Hindi-language psychological thriller television series created by Gurmeet Singh based on the 2018 Irish drama series Blood by Sophie Petzal for Disney+ Hotstar. The series stars Boman Irani, Samara Tijori, Upasana Singh, Manjari Phadnis, Saariika Singh, Veer Rajwant Singh and Manu Rishi in the lead roles. The series was released on June 17, 2022.

== Cast ==
- Boman Irani as Dr. Balraj Kapoor
- Samara Tijori as Sana
- Manjari Fadnis as Sanjana
- Upasana Singh as Dr. Gunwant
- Manu Rishi
- Veer Rajwant Singh as Sanjeev
- Saariika Singh
- Sukhpal Singh
- Nikhil Nair
- Akashdeep Arora
- Jobanpreet Singh

== Reception ==
Saibal Chatterjee of NDTV gave it 2.5 stars out of 5 and stated that "Masoom is principally a father-daughter drama about a man who is neither a good dad nor a particularly dependable husband. It hinges on Irani's unfussy, unshowy performance that hits the steadiest of notes in a patchy series. His is a sterling turn in a middling show." Sreeparna Sengupta of The Times of India gave 3 stars out of 5 and said that "‘Masoom’ sets a tone for intrigue and suspense right from the start. From the background music that spells uncertainty to the misty hues of Punjab, the series draws you in with its atmospheric build." Abhimanyu Mathur of Hindustan Times observed that "Masoom is a simple story that has been made quite well and performed even better. The slow-burn thriller is equal parts emotional and equal parts riveting, and will keep the viewer engaged for sure."

Nandini Ramnath of Scroll.in writes that "There’s no shortage of web series about families with dark secrets, for whom a crime sets off a maelstrom of suspicion, repressed memories and guilt. Masoom, which is stacked with both over-stewed and half-cooked scenes, adds little to this type of show." Shubhra Gupta of The Indian Express stated that "This Boman Irani starrer should have parlayed into a taut thriller, but the result is only intermittently effective and comes off, overall, strangely bloodless."

Gautaman Bhaskaran of News 18 rated it 3.5/5 stars and said that "Masoom really stands out for Irani’s compelling performance as a man deeply frustrated at his inability to ease his wife’s agony." Sunidhi Prajapat of OTT Play gave 3 stars out of 5 and said that "Masoom mostly keeps you going because of the ace performances, but do not dare to stream it for a perfect crime-thriller. However, the fresh take on intense family drama makes it a one-time watch." Manik Sharma of Firstpost said that "Masoom suffers from the unevenness of focus but it is still a deliciously wicked tale of a family that is struggling to stay together."
