= Rahu Ketu =

Rahu Ketu may refer to:

- Rahu Ketu (1978 film), Hindi-language action film directed by B. R. Ishara
- Rahu Ketu (2026 film), Hindi-language comedy film directed by Vipul Vig
