= Daldal (2026 TV series) =

Indian television series

- Genre: Psychological; Crime thriller
- Created by: Suresh Triveni
- Based on: Bhendi Bazaar by Vish Dhamija
- Written by: Sreekanth Agneeaswaran; Rohan D'Souza; Hussain Haidry; Priya Saggi; Suresh Triveni
- Directed by: Amrit Raj Gupta
- Starring: Bhumi Pednekar; Aditya Rawal; Sandeep Kulkarni; Samara Tijori
- Music by: Shubhajit Mukherjee
- Country of origin: India
- Original language: Hindi
- No. of series: 1
- No. of episodes: 7

Production
- Producers: Vikram Malhotra; Suresh Triveni
- Cinematography: Rakesh Haridas
- Editor: Shivkumar V. Panicker
- Camera setup: Multi-camera
- Running time: 39–49 minutes
- Production company: Abundatia Entertainment

Original release
- Network: Prime Video
- Release: 30 January 2026

Daldal is an Indian Hindi-language psychological crime thriller television series created by Suresh Triveni and directed by Amrit Raj Gupta. The series is based on Vish Dhamija's bestselling novel Bhendi Bazaar. It stars Bhumi Pednekar in the lead role alongside Samara Tijori and Aditya Rawal. It premiered on Prime Video on 30 January 2026.

== Plot ==
Daldal follows DCP Rita Ferreira (Bhumi Pednekar), the youngest officer to head the Mumbai Crime Branch, as she is drawn into a tense, emotionally exhaustive investigation into a brutal serial killer terrorising the city.

== Season 1 ==
No.	Title	Directed by	Written by	Original release date
1	"Gunaah"	Amrit Raj Gupta	Suresh Triveni, et al.	January 30, 2026
Plot: After rescuing minor girls, Rita Ferreira is promoted as Mumbai's youngest female DCP. Beneath her success, Rita battles sexism, impostor syndrome, a failed engagement, and returning addiction. She begins hallucinating her deceased mother. The episode introduces Anita and Sajid as young killers in a parallel storyline. Rita is drawn into a complex murder investigation.
2	"Raaz"	Amrit Raj Gupta	Suresh Triveni, et al.	January 30, 2026
Plot: To protect her secret drug addiction after a peddler is detained, Rita makes a compromised, immoral choice. Despite pressure to focus on desk work, she connects the dots on a series of graphic killings.
3	"Janm"	Amrit Raj Gupta	Suresh Triveni, et al.	January 30, 2026
Plot: Flashbacks reveal Anita and Sajid's abusive childhood. In the present, Rita's personal life collapses. A high-profile murder occurs, causing Commissioner Deshpande to consider giving the case to rival Vikram Sathe.
4	"Daga"	Amrit Raj Gupta	Suresh Triveni, et al.	January 30, 2026
Plot: Following another murder, Vikram focuses on a gang theory while Rita defies orders to pursue an independent investigation. The investigation reveals deep institutional corruption.
5	"Talaash"	Amrit Raj Gupta	Suresh Triveni, et al.	January 30, 2026
Plot: Deshpande sides with Vikram, sidelining Rita. Despite losing authority, she finds evidence linking the murders to the orphans' past.
6	"Jad"	Amrit Raj Gupta	Suresh Triveni, et al.	January 30, 2026
Plot: Another murder occurs despite Vikram's "closed" case, embarrassing the department. Rita's addiction is exposed, leaving her career in jeopardy as she seeks the root of the killers' pain.
7	"Yaad"	Amrit Raj Gupta	Suresh Triveni, et al.	January 30, 2026
Plot: In the finale, Rita's personal traumas collide with the killers' vendetta. She faces her demons while concluding the case, highlighting the consequences of systemic failure.

== Cast ==
- Bhumi Pednekar as DCP Rita Ferreira
- Aditya Rawal as Sajid
- Samara Tijori as Anita Acharya
- Geeta Agrawal Sharma as Indu Mhatre
- Chinmay Mandlekar as Vikram Sathe
- Sandeep Kulkarni as Prabhat Raut
- Ananth Mahadevan as Manohar Swamy
- Sandesh Kulkarni as Sanjay Deshpande
- Saurabh Goyal as Jatin Shukla
- Vibhavari Deshpande as Isabel Ferreira
- Vijay Krishna as Aditya Kelkar
- Pratap Phad as Subhash Kamat
- Prateek Pachauri as Doctor Peddler
- Prince Sharmaa as JJ Hospital Doctor
- Rahul Bhat as Jay Acharya
- Jaya Bhattacharya as Lollita

== Production ==
Bhumi Pednekar has officially wrapped up filming for this series in September 2024.

== Release ==
The series premiered on Amazon Prime Video on 30 January 2026 and consists of seven episodes.

== Reception ==
Daldal received mixed reviews from the critics.

Shubhra Gupta of The Indian Express gave 2 stars out of5 and writes that "The seven episode series, created by Suresh Triveni and directed by Amrit Raj Gupta, has an intriguing opening and But more and more, as we go along, the bizarre-contrived elements start taking over, and it’s eye-roll time." Abhimanyu Mathur of Hindustan Times rated it 3.5/5 stars and said that "Daldal could have been the perfect start to the year for Hindi streaming. It had everything in it to be an excellent show. For now, it is ‘merely’ a good one." Rahul Desai of The Hollywood Reporter India stated that "The 7-episode series suffers from the women-written-by-men syndrome."

Lachmi Deb Roy of Firstpost gave 3.5 stars out of 5 and said that "Not just Bhumi Pednekar; even Aditya Rawal & Samara Tijori’s killer performances will keep you glued to the screen!" Anuj Kumar of The Hindu observed that "More gory and opaque than immersive, the crime thriller starring Bhumi Pednekar oversells the idea of a bold female-centric narrative."

Divya Nair of Rediff.comgave 3.5 stars out of 5 and commented that "If dark and twisted crime thrillers and trauma-led violence interest you, you can binge-watch Daldal over the weekend." Rachit Gupta of Filmfare rated it 3/5 stars and said that "Fantastic performances by Bhumi Pednekar and an ensemble cast, along with technical expertise are eventually let down by laboured writing in Daldal."

Udita Jhunjhunwala of Scroll.in writes that "Stylistically, Daldal makes baffling choices. The music is frequently intrusive, including a foreign-language track, which clashes with the mood. The use of a radio as a device to dump backstory is ineffective, though the choice of repeating scenes from different perspectives occasionally adds insight." Anurag Singh Bohra writing for India Today rated it 3/5 stars and said that "Bhumi Pedneker's crime-thriller Daldal explores social realities amid an ongoing crime investigation. However, bold themes and strong performances can't fully salvage the series, hampered by redundant flashbacks and clichés."

Arpita Sarkar of OTT Play awarded it 3.5 stars out of 5 and said that "Daldal is not without flaws, but it is undoubtedly ambitious. Focusing on the psychology behind the crimes rather than the crimes themselves, the series offers a darker, more introspective viewing experience." A critic of Bollywood Hungama rated it 2.5/5 stars and stated that "DALDAL tells an intriguing tale and delivers several arresting moments. The supporting cast, in particular, lifts the material, while the climax lands with genuine tension. At the same time, the series stumbles in places due to a few convenient turns and loose ends, while the central characterization remains somewhat one-note, which dilutes the impact. An average fare."
