= Vish Dhamija =

British Indian crime-fiction writer

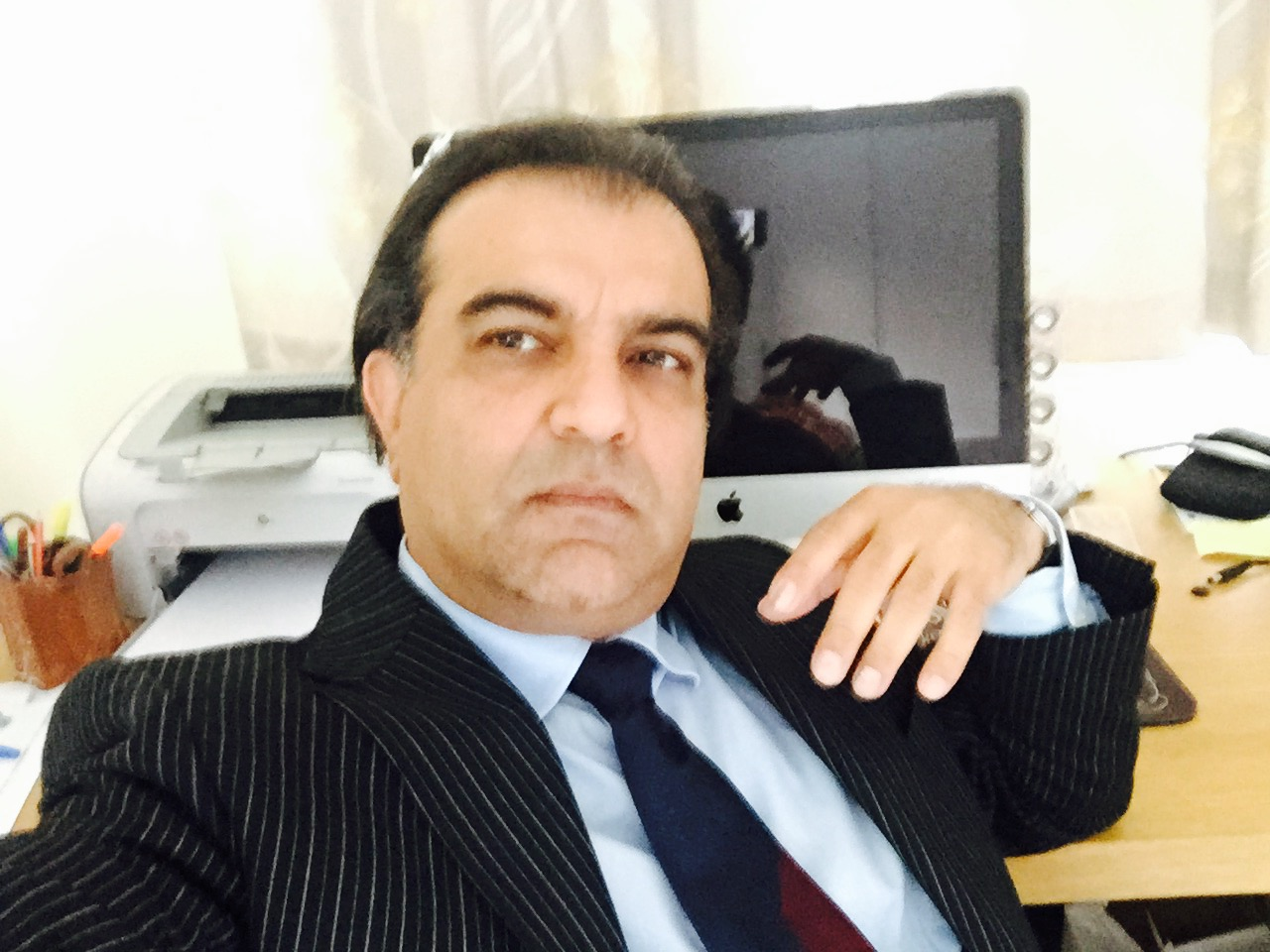
- Vish Dhamija
- Born: 30 July; Ajmer, Rajasthan, India
- Education: Alliance Manchester Business School (M.B.A.)
- Occupations: Digital marketer; crime fiction writer
- Writing career
- Language: English
- Years active: 2010 to present
- Genres: Crime fiction; legal thrillers; psychological thrillers
- Notable work: Rita Ferreira Series
- Website: vishdhamija.com

Vish Dhamija is an International award-winning, British Indian, crime-fiction writer. He is the first writer of Indian origin to win the prestigious Gran Prix for International Crime Novel at Festival Polar de Cognac for his novel, Le Magnat in 2024. The French Press celebrated him as one the five crime writers not to be missed. The Mogul's translation in French (La Magnat) was also the Finalist for ‘Discovery of the Year’ Prize at Noir Charbon. ARS NOTORIA magazine (UK) listed The Mogul/La Magnat as one of the best books from South Asia for 2024.

According to the Indian Press he is India's Best Page-Turner and one of the ten most popular Indian thriller authors. He is the only writer of Indian origin listed among the major legal thriller authors of the world. He is also known for his psychological thrillers.

In August 2015, at the release of his first legal fiction (his third novel) Déjà Karma, Glimpse Magazine called him India's John Grisham for stimulating the genre of legal fiction in India which was almost non-existent before his arrival on the scene. In a survey by eBooks India website, Vish Dhamija was listed along the top 51 Indian authors you must follow. The Asian Age and The Times of India have cited him as the only legal fiction writer in India.

Dhamija's stories have been published in India (Pan Macmillan, Harper Collins, Srishti Publishers), in the United States (Blackstone, Tantor Media) and in France (Mera Éditions).

In January 2026, Daldal—adapted from Dhamija’s acclaimed book Bhendi Bazaar—premiered on Amazon Prime Video, bringing its gritty, layered narrative to a global audience. Headlined by Bhumi Pednekar in a riveting turn as Rita Ferreira, the series quickly captured viewers’ attention with its taut storytelling and atmospheric depth.

What began as a highly anticipated adaptation soon evolved into a bona fide streaming success. Daldal trended across the United States, the United Kingdom, Europe, and the UAE, signaling its resonance far beyond its home turf. The ensemble cast, including standout performances by Samara Tijori and Aditya Rawal, added further nuance and intensity to a show that deftly balanced suspense with emotional complexity.

== Early life ==
Dhamija grew up in Ajmer, Rajasthan, where he spent the first twenty years of his life. He attended St. Anselm's School, a convent school in Ajmer. He earned his B.Com. from Government College, Ajmer. Dhamija dropped out of law school after his first year, and then attended Jodhpur University for a degree in management. After a few years of working in the corporate world in India, he left for Manchester Business School in the UK for an MBA in Marketing and Strategy.

In school, Dhamija was very active in literary and stage activities. He was the President of the school's Literary Society.

== Writing career ==
Dhamija's first book, Nothing Lasts Forever, a crime thriller was published in 2010 by Srishti Publishers; it was long-listed for "Vodafone-Crossword Book Award 2011".

Bhendi Bazaar and tells the story of a serial killer and the police officer who attempts to identify the pattern behind the killer's murders before she becomes the next victim. The book spent over a year in India's Top 100 list for 'Crime, Thriller, and Mystery', and has been noted for its ingenious plot and rich characters.

Dhamija has said in interviews that crime fiction, which is mainly what he reads, is the only genre in which he can imagine himself writing for the time being.

In August 2015, Déjà Karma (Dhamija's third book and first legal and psychological thriller) became a bestseller and was featured on both The Financial Express and Crossword Bookstores lists for two consecutive weeks.

His next book, Doosra – The Other One* was released in Feb 2016, and Business Standard featured it in March, calling it a "…must read.". Dhamija's fifth book - Nothing Else Matters was launched at the Kumaon Literary Festival in October. In November it reached number 6 on WH Smith charts on both, domestic and international airports in New Delhi. Bloggers rated it as one of the top 10 books by Indian authors in 2016 and top 10 romance novels of 2016 by Indian authors. HarperCollins India released Dhamija's sixth book, Unlawful Justice in June 2017, which The Times of India called: "a gripping legal thriller". Unlawful Justice was recognized by Amazon India as one of the Memorable Books of 2017, and The Asian Age included it in its annual listing of the Best Books of 2017.

Dhamija's seventh book (his third legal fiction), The Mogul was released in July 2018 by HarperCollins. "Gripping", said The Times of India. The Indian Express, in its review, called out that "Dhamija has set the sky as the limit, figuratively and literally." The Telegraph praised, The Heist Artist (Dhamija's eighth book, a crime caper) saying: “It’s difficult to find a single dull moment in this book...”. The Heist Artist was the only Indian author/publication to be included in The Times of India list of "Crime fiction and thrillers you should read in 2019" and is listed as one of the eight crime fiction novels that other crime writers must read.

In June 2019, Abundantia Entertainment announced that it had acquired the rights to Dhamija's much sought-after "Rita Ferreira" series (Bhendi Bazaar, Doosra & Lipstick) to adapt the books into a multi-season, premium original digital series.

Dhamija's second psychological thriller, Prisoner's Dilemma, was published by Pan Macmillan in April 2021. It had a slow start due to COVID-19, but it has been on the WH Smith charts (at airport) even a year after launch.

Cold Justice, Dhamija's fourth legal thriller, released on July 4, 2022, and The Times of India called it: "A gripping, heart-stopping novel… a must-read recommendation for thriller lovers."

Déjà Karma was republished by Pan Macmillan India in 2023. It was called, "The Most Riveting Courtroom Drama of The Year" by Deccan Chronicle.

Le Magnat was published in French by Mera Editions in April 2024.

The Secret Diary of a Conman, Dhamija's twelfth book, published by Pan Macmillan India, was launched in July 2024. Written in epistolary form, it was one of the first books that featured a playlist that worked in tandem with the story (every chapter has a corresponding track). By August, the book was a bestseller in Amazon Crime and at W H Smith and Relay bookstores. Dhamija's next book, a psychological thriller, titled Haadsaa was released by Bloomsbury India in July 2025. Dhamija is a popular author in France, and his title: Unlawful Justice was published in France as Au Nom de la Justice. in January 2026, along with the release of his previous title (Le Magnat) in a different format by Éditions Points

== Personal life ==
Dhamija worked in marketing and retailing for almost two decades for global brands like Ford, Kodak and United Colors of Benetton. He is now a public speaker, and runs nursery schools in the UK. He is married to Nidhi Singh, the great-granddaughter of Raja Mahendra Pratap. Vish spends his time between UK and India.

== Bibliography ==
	Books
Stand Alone Works	Nothing Lasts Forever
Stand Alone Works	Nothing Else Matters
Stand Alone Works	The Heist Artist
Stand Alone Works	Prisoner's Dilemma
Stand Alone Works	The Secret Diary of a Conman
Stand Alone Works	Haadsaa - A Mere Incident
DCP Rita Ferriera Series	Bhendi Bazaar
DCP Rita Ferriera Series	Doosra
DCP Rita Ferriera Series	Lipstick
Legal Thrillers	Déjà Karma
Legal Thrillers	Unlawful Justice
Legal Thrillers	The Mogul
Legal Thrillers	Cold Justice
Legal Thrillers	Le Magnat (French)
Legal Thrillers	Au Nom de la Justice (French)

== See also ==
- List of Indian writers
