= Callum Dixon =

Callum Dixon may refer to:

- Callum Dixon (actor) (born 1983), British actor
- Callum Dixon (rower) (born 2000), British rower
