= Dabba Cartel =

Indian crime drama series on Netflix (2025)

- Promotional poster
- Genre: Crime drama
- Created by: Shibani Dandekar Akhtar; Vishnu Menon; Gaurav Kapur; Akanksha Seda
- Directed by: Hitesh Bhatia
- Starring: Shabana Azmi; Jyothika; Shalini Pandey; Bhupendra Jadawat; Nimisha Sajayan; Anjali Anand
- Country of origin: India
- Original language: Hindi
- No. of seasons: 1
- No. of episodes: 7

Production
- Cinematography: Eeshit Narain
- Editors: Manas Mittal, Parikshhit Jha
- Running time: 45—56 minutes
- Production company: Excel Entertainment

Original release
- Network: Netflix
- Release: 28 February 2025 – present

Dabba Cartel is a 2025 Indian Hindi-language crime drama series. Created by Shibani Dandekar Akhtar, Vishnu Menon, Gaurav Kapur, and Akanksha Seda, and directed by Hitesh Bhatia, the series is produced under Excel Entertainment. It stars Shabana Azmi, Jyothika, Shalini Pandey, Nimisha Sajayan, and Anjali Anand as a group of women operating a drug cartel under the guise of a food delivery company.

The series premiered on Netflix on 28 February 2025.

== Premise ==
Dabba Cartel is set in the Mumbai suburb of Thane. The story revolves around five middle-class women running a traditional dabbawala (lunchbox) service. Unexpectedly, they become involved in a high-stakes drug operation, using lunchboxes to transport illicit goods. As their network expands, they must navigate dangerous criminals, law enforcement, and personal betrayals, all while maintaining the facade of their normal lives.

== Cast ==
- Shabana Azmi as Sheila “Ba” Jagtap: Hari’s mother; Raji’s mother-in-law
- Jyothika as Varuna Dasgupta (née Panikar): Owner of Sitara; Shankar’s wife
- Shalini Pandey as Raji Jagtap: Hari’s wife; Sheila's daughter-in-law
- Nimisha Sajayan as Mala: Raji’s business partner; Kunni’s mother; Varuna's ex-maid
- Prateik Pachori as Santosh: A drug dealer; Mala's boyfriend
- Anjali Anand as Shahida: A Real Estate broker; Preeti's love interest
- Gajraj Rao as Ajit Pathak: FDSCO inspector investigating Vivalife Pharmaceutical
- Sai Tamhankar as SI Preeti: Shahida's love interest; Ajit’s partner in investigating Vivalife Pharmaceutical
- Lillete Dubey as Mrs. Moushami Majumdar: Sheila's best friend
  - Mansi Sehgal as Young Moushami
- Jisshu Sengupta as Shankar Dasgupta: Head of Vivalife Pharmaceutical; Varuna's husband
- Bhupendra Jadawat as Hari Jagtap: Sheila’s son; Raji's husband
- Sushmita Mukherjee as Tejaswi Tijori: President of Vivalife Society
- Vivek Madan as Vinay: Vivalife Pharmaceutical employee
- Abhiijeet Chitre as Naresh
- Santanu Ghatak as Bhowmick Bose
- Sandesh Kulkarni as drug dealer Chavan
- Salim Husen Mulla as Ganya
- Sunil Grover as Chacko Kurian: drug lord (special appearance)

== Production ==
=== Development ===
The series was announced by Netflix India in 2023 as part of its collaboration with Excel Entertainment. It was conceived as a crime drama exploring women’s empowerment through an unconventional narrative.

=== Filming ===
Principal photography took place in Mumbai, Maharashtra, India.

== Music ==
Dabba Cartel

Soundtrack album by Gaurav Raina and Komorebi
- Released: 5 May 2025
- Genre: Feature film soundtrack
- Length: 16:35
- Label: Universal Music India
- Producer: Gaurav Raina

The series's soundtrack composed by Gaurav Raina and Komorebi.

Track listing
No.	Title	Length
1.	"Dabba Cartel Theme"	1:01
2.	"Pyaas"	3:34
3.	"Cartel's Theme"	2:11
4.	"Shiela's Theme"	2:03
5.	"Chavan's Theme"	1:56
6.	"Noire Circus"	3:27
7.	"Trapped"	2:27
Total length:		16:35

== Release ==
Dabba Cartel was released worldwide on 28 February 2025, exclusively on Netflix.

== Reception ==
Shubhra Gupta of The Indian Express described it as a "trippy, twisted ride," particularly highlighting the lead cast's chemistry and the show's engaging plot. Archika Khurana of The Times of India called it "an engaging crime drama with strong female leads and a gripping storyline." Margaret Lyons for NY Times wrote "This Indian Netflix series isn’t the most original thing ever, but it comes loaded with brains, humor and electric performances." Saibal Chatterjee of NDTV gave 3 stars out of 5 and said that "Uneven but always engrossing, Dabba Cartel has the potential for a longer run. It would be interesting to watch where the cartel goes from here and what shape their dabbas take. " A critic for Bollywood Hungama rated the season, 3 stars out of 5 and wrote "Dabba Cartel is an engaging watch, thanks to its intriguing premise, strong casting, and gripping execution that holds the audience's attention from start to finish. However, the cinematic liberties in the writing slightly diminish its overall impact."

Sukanya Verma of Rediff.com rated 3/5 stars and notes "Dabba Cartel’s reluctant black comedy in the body of a crime thriller starts out interestingly enough to accomplish its Narcos: Thane aspirations." Shilajit Mitra of The Hindu observed that "This Netflix series wobbles between coolness and chaos, menace and mirth, never quite finding its pitch". Vineeta Kumar of India Today gave 2 stars out of 5 and commented that "You get enough surprises but are never taken aback by them. In the last episode, which is the longest at one hour-13 minutes, the climax is supposed to make your jaws drop. But, your jaws are only dropping from boredom as you drag yourself to finish the series with a wide yawn at the end. " Abhimanyu Mathur of Hindustan Times said that "Shabana Azmi, Jyotika, and Nimisha Sajayan's performances aside, this desi Narcos has little to offer." Nandini Ramnath of scroll.in said "Dabba Cartel begins well, with potentially interesting characters and a set-up within the realm of the possible. Filled mostly with plainly attired women who barely wear make-up, Dabba Cartel feels like it could actually be happening." Lachmi Deb Roy of Firstpost gave 3.5 stars out of 5 and writes that "It has its flaws, but it’s insight into the narcos world is indeed priceless. And the realism in Dabba Cartel’s storytelling overshadows all the drawbacks."

== Awards and nominations ==
- Won : OTTPlay Awards for Best Supporting Actor (Female) : Jyothika
