= Shereen Martineau =

Irish actress

Shereen Martin
- Born: Shereen Martineau; Ireland
- Education: RADA
- Occupation: Actor
- Years active: 2002–present
- Known for: The Loch; Blood; Dublin Murders

Shereen Martineau, who goes by the stage name Shereen Martin, is an Irish actress of stage and screen, who trained at the Royal Academy of Dramatic Art (RADA). She is known in particular for her television roles, e.g., on the BBC drama series The Loch (2017), on the Channel 5-Virgin Media drama series Blood (2018), and on the BBC drama series Dublin Murders (2019). Her stage productions from 2004 to 2007 include Twelfth Night at the Albery Theatre, Tejas Verdes at the Gate Theatre, Fallujah in 2007 at the Old Truman Theatre, and The Hour We Knew Nothing of Each Other at Royal National Theatre, all in London; and Euripides' The Bacchae at Abbey Theatre, in Dublin.

== Early life and education ==
Shereen Martin is the stage name of the actor born in Ireland, Shereen Martineau. Martin trained at the Royal Academy of Dramatic Art (RADA), graduating in 2002 with a B.A. in Acting.

== Career ==
Stage and screen actor Shereen Martin is known for her television roles, e.g., as Kirsty Petrie on the BBC drama series The Loch (2017), as Sarah on the Channel 5-Virgin Media drama series Blood (2018), and as Sophie Miller on the BBC drama series Dublin Murders (2019). Her stage productions include Twelfth Night in 2004 at the Albery Theatre, Tejas Verdes in 2005 at the Gate Theatre, Fallujah in 2007 at the Old Truman Theatre, and The Hour We Knew Nothing of Each Other in 2008, at Royal National Theatre, all in London; and Euripides' The Bacchae in 2006 at Abbey Theatre, in Dublin,

=== Television ===
Year	Title	Role	Notes, Citation
2005	Holby City	Jyoti Puri	Episode: "Losing Control".
2005	The Last Detective	Saleswoman	Episode: "Three Steps to Hendon".
2005	The Bill	Farida Siddiqui	Episodes 367, "When Justice Isn't Enough—Part 1", and 343, "Finger of Blame".
2006	EastEnders	Nurse Malma Chaudury	
2006–2009	Doctors	Kookub Raza / Laura Ferguson	Episode: "My Other Life / A Moment of Tension".
2009	Lewis	Amanda Costello	Episode: "The Quality of Mercy".
2012	A Mother's Son	Pathologist	Episodes 1.1 and 1.2.
2016	DCI Banks	Jess McAllistair	Episode: "To Burn in Every Drop of Blood".
2017	The Loch	Kirsty Petrie	
2017	The Brave	Amara Baghdadi	Pilot episode.
2018	Vera	DI Sunetra Chandra	Episode: "Blood and Bone".
2018–present	Blood	Sarah	
2019	Midsomer Murders	Debbie Gallagher	Episode: "The Lions of Causton".
2019	Dublin Murders	Sophie Miller	
2019	The Feed	Sen	
2020	The Salisbury Poisonings	Dr. Rebecca Jenner	Episode: 1.3.

=== Theatre ===
Year	Title	Role, Citation	Writer	Director	Venue
2004	Twelfth Night	Viola	William Shakespeare	Stephen Beresford	Albery Theatre now the Noël Coward Theatre, London
2005	Tejas Verdes	Colorina	Fermin Gabal, translated by Robert Shaw	Thea Sharrock	Gate Theatre, London
2006	The Bacchae	Chorus	Euripides	Conall Morrison	Abbey Theatre, Dublin
2007	Fallujah	Jo	Jonathan Holmes	Jonathan Holmes	Old Truman Theatre, London
2008	The Hour We Knew Nothing of Each Other	Various	Peter Handke	James Macdonald	National Theatre, London
