= Sophie Petzal =

British screenwriter (born 1990)

- Born: 4 November 1990 (age 35); Brighton, UK
- Occupation: Screenwriter
- Writing career
- Period: 2012–
- Genre: Drama
- Notable awards: Sir Peter Ustinov Television Scriptwriting Award (2012); Best Long-Form Drama at the Writers' Guild Of Great Britain Awards (2020)

Sophie Petzal (born 4 November 1990) is a British screenwriter, best known for creating the Irish crime drama, Blood.

== Career ==
Having written comedy shorts as a child, Petzal first gained attention with her script The God Committee, one of the winners of All Mixed Up, a competition run in conjunction with the Triforce Creative Network and BBC Comedy. The script secured her an agent. While studying screenwriting at Bournemouth University, Petzal secured a place as a BBC Production Trainee. Her script Sanctioned won the Sir Peter Ustinov Television Scriptwriting Award at the International Emmys.

Following a trainee placement at CBBC in script editing, she started writing for several CBBC shows, including Wolfblood, Hetty Feather, The Dumping Ground and Danger Mouse. She subsequently moved into hour-long drama, writing episodes of Jekyll and Hyde (produced by Foz Allen, who was also the producer on Wolfblood and Hetty Feather), Medici, The Last Kingdom, and Riviera.

In 2018, Petzal's first original TV drama series Blood, starring Adrian Dunbar and Carolina Main, aired on TV3 and Channel 5. Her script for Blood won Best Long-Form Drama at the Writers' Guild Of Great Britain Awards. It was renewed for a second series, which began broadcasting in April 2020. It was announced in February 2020 that Petzal was writing a four-part thriller for ITV, Hollington Drive. The first episode aired on 29 September 2021.

On 13 December 2020, Netflix announced that Petzal would helm an adaptation of The Seven Deaths of Evelyn Hardcastle. On 17 January 2023, it was reported that after 2 years of development, Netflix had cancelled it. On 14 May 2026, it was announced that Petzal would write on the second series of Sky's Prisoner.
