= The Loch (TV series) =

British drama television series

- Genre: Crime drama
- Created by: Stephen Brady
- Written by: Stephen Brady; Chris Hurford
- Directed by: Brian Kelly; Cilla Ware
- Starring: Laura Fraser; Siobhan Finneran; William Ash; Jack Bannon; Don Gilét
- Composer: Ben Bartlett
- Country of origin: United Kingdom
- No. of series: 1
- No. of episodes: 6

Production
- Executive producers: Ross McKenzie; Tim Haines; Natalie Usher
- Producer: Alan J. Wands
- Production location: Fort Augustus Scotland
- Cinematography: Denis Crossan
- Editor: Colin Monie
- Running time: 45 minutes
- Production company: ITV Studios

Original release
- Network: ITV
- Release: 11 June – 16 July 2017

The Loch (also known as Loch Fyne, and as Loch Ness on Acorn TV in America) is a six-part British television drama series, created by screenwriter Stephen Brady, that first broadcast on ITV on 11 June 2017.

== Synopsis ==
The series follows DS Annie Redford (Laura Fraser), a small town police officer with the Scottish Highland Police, as she investigates the murder of piano teacher Niall Swift, who is found dead at the bottom of a cliff in the picturesque village of Lochnafoy. When it becomes apparent that part of Swift's brain has been removed, and a human heart belonging to another victim is found close by, Annie's team realise they are searching for a serial killer. In response, a Glasgow-based English major investigation senior officer, DCI Lauren Quigley (Siobhan Finneran), is brought in to lead the enquiry.

== Notable cast members ==
- Laura Fraser as DS Annie Redford
- Siobhan Finneran as DCI Lauren Quigley
- Don Gilet as Blake Albrighton
- John Sessions as DCI Frank Smilie
- Gray O'Brien as Alan Redford
- William Ash as Leighton Thomas
- Alastair Mackenzie as Craig Petrie
- John Heffernan as Dr. Simon Marr
- Jack Bannon as Kieran Whitehead
- Simone Lahbib as Mhari Toner
- Ron Donachie as Iain Sutherland
- Shereen Martineau as Kirsty Petrie
- Jenny Ryan as Nicole Patterson

== Episodes ==
No. overall	No. in season	Title	Directed by	Written by	Original release date	UK viewers (millions)
1	1	"Episode 1"	Brian Kelly	Stephen Brady	11 June 2017	8.18
Piano teacher Niall Swift, who had been fired by local doctor Simon Marr just hours earlier, is found dead at the bottom of a cliff by local schoolteacher Craig Petrie. Swift's tragic end is initially deemed as suicide, until pathologists discover that part of his brain was removed while he was still alive. Meanwhile, a human heart is discovered amongst the animal bones and offal used in a prank undertaken by a group of local students, including Annie's daughter, to recreate 'Nessie's corpse'. Realising that the team are dealing with a serial killer, DCI Lauren Quigley is seconded in to lead the investigation, alongside psychological profiler Blake Albrighton.
2	2	"Episode 2"	Brian Kelly	Stephen Brady	18 June 2017	6.98
Blake oversteps the mark by announcing to the media that the team are certain that a serial killer is operating in Lochnafoy.
3	3	"Episode 3"	Brian Kelly	Stephen Brady	25 June 2017	6.54
Quigley organises a village meeting in an attempt to flush out the killer. Annie continues the search for Jonjo.
4	4	"Episode 4"	Cilla Ware	Chris Hurford	2 July 2017	6.29
Tench unwittingly reveals the truth about Leighton to Alan.
5	5	"Episode 5"	Cilla Ware	Stephen Brady	9 July 2017	6.67
The team finally believe they have uncovered the identity of the killer, and Annie discovers evidence which seemingly backs up their theory – but Blake isn't convinced, and continues to dig for clues.
6	6	"Episode 6"	Cilla Ware	Stephen Brady	16 July 2017	6.42
As the real killer remains at large, Annie realises that Evie could be the next victim.

== Release ==
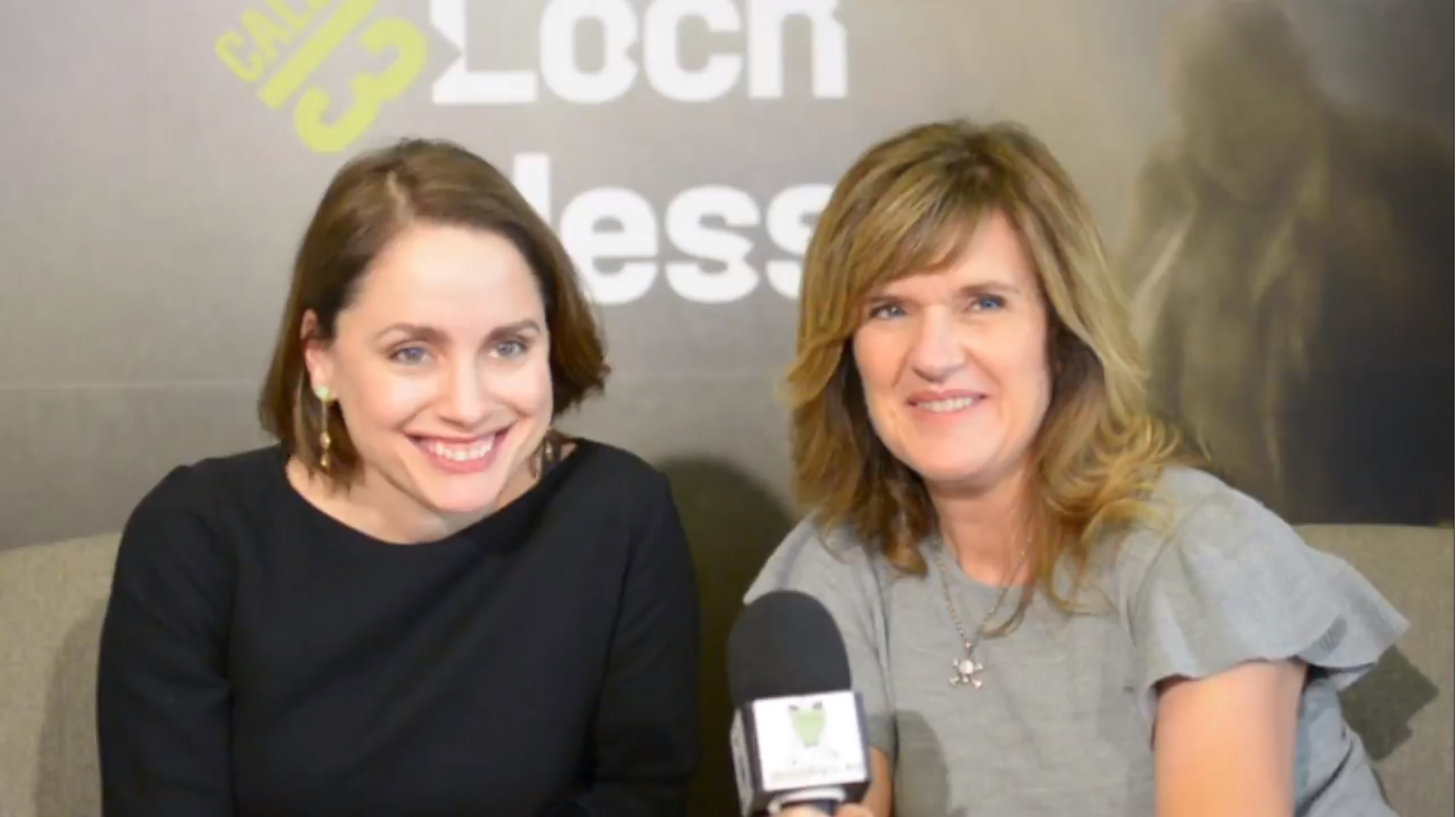
Fraser and Finneran in a press interview for the series in 2017

The series was filmed in the summer of 2016 and was shown in full in the Netherlands and Australia before its British broadcast.

The Loch aired on 11 June 2017 on ITV. Internationally, broadcast under the title Loch Ness, the series premiered in Australia on 20 April 2017 on BBC First and in the United States on 19 June 2017 on subscription streaming service Acorn TV. The series aired in October and November 2017 on CBC in Canada and 13 ulica in Poland. The series premiered in the Netherlands on 5 November 2017 on RTf

== Home media ==
The Netherlands also released the series on DVD in May 2017, a month before the series premiered in the UK. In both countries, the series was aired under its original title of Loch Ness.

== Reception ==
The series received mixed reviews, featuring a Metacritic score of 67 out of 100, indicating "generally favorable reviews". On another review aggregator website, Rotten Tomatoes, the series reported a 64% approval rating based on 14 critic reviews. The website's critics consensus reads, "Derivative yet still intriguing, Loch Ness [The Loch] delivers an uneven first season that suffers in comparison to superior series while hinting at greater potential." It was released on DVD in the United Kingdom on 17 July 2017.
