= The Hour We Knew Nothing of Each Other =

One-act play written by Peter Handke

- Original language: German
- Written by: Peter Handke
- Genre: One-act play
- Setting: A bright, empty town square

Premiere
- Date: 1992
- Place: Austria

The Hour We Knew Nothing of Each Other (German: Die Stunde, da wir nichts voneinander wußten) is a one-act play without words written by Peter Handke. The play has 450 characters and focuses on a day in the life of an unspecified town square. It was first performed in 1992.

== Plot ==
In an interview with Sigrid Löffler for Profil in May 1992, Handke described the idea behind the play:

The trigger for the play was an afternoon several years ago. I'd spent the entire day on a little square in Muggia near Trieste. I sat on the terrace of a café and watched life pass by. I got into a real state of observation, perhaps this was helped along a bit by the wine. Every little thing became significant (without being symbolic). The tiniest procedures seemed significant of the world. After three or four hours a hearse drew up in front of a house, men entered and came out with a coffin, onlookers assembled and then dispersed, the hearse drove away. After that the hustle and bustle continued - the milling of tourists, natives and workers. Those who came after this occurrence didn't know what had gone on before. But for me, who had seen it, everything that happened after the incident with the hearse seemed somewhat coloured by it. None of the people on the square knew anything of each other - hence the title. But we, the onlookers see them as sculptures who sculpt each other through what goes on before and after. Only through what comes after does that which has gone before gain contours; and what went on before sculpts what is to come.

== Productions ==
The play was first staged in Vienna in 1992. It was first performed in the UK at the Edinburgh Festival in 1994.

It was produced with a new translation by Meredith Oakes at the Lyttelton Theatre, National Theatre, London, opening on 13 February 2008. The production ran until 12 April. It was directed by James Macdonald with Jonathan Burrows as associate director and featured the following ensemble cast:

- Susan Brown
- Jessie Burton
- Pip Carter
- Paul Chesterton
- Lisa Dillon
- Callum Dixon
- Noma Dumezweni
- Susan Engel
- Susannah Fielding
- Mark Hadfield
- Amy Hall
- Daniel Hawksford
- Tom Hickey
- Richard Hope
- Mairead McKinley
- Nick Malinowski
- Shereen Martineau
- Justine Mitchell
- Daniel Poyser
- Adrian Schiller
- Amit Shah
- Sara Stewart
- Giles Terera
- Jason Thorpe
- Harry Towb
- Simon Wilson
- Sarah Woodward

The technical crew were as follows:

- Set Designer - Hildegard Bechtler
- Costume Designer - Moritz Junge
- Lighting Designer - Jean Kalman
- Music - Mel Mercier
- Sound Designer - Christopher Shutt

In 2009, Tantrum Theatre performed The Hour We Knew Nothing Of Each Other in the open-air of Wheeler Place, Newcastle, Australia.

The play was staged at the Royal Lyceum Theatre in Edinburgh in the Meredith Oakes translation from 31 May to 2 June 2018. It was directed by Wils Wilson and Janice Parker. The 450 characters were played by a community cast of more than 90 non-professional Edinburgh residents.

The play made its United States debut in 2002, in Chicago, presented by TUTA Theatre Company at the National Pastime Theater

It opened on May 30 and ran until July 1 and was directed by Zeljko Djukic. It featured the following ensemble cast:

- Bob Kulhan
- Martin Marion
- Trey Maclin
- Jacqueline Stone
- Matthew Van Colton
- Heather Evans
- Allegra Hollenbeck
- Frank Baumann
- Matt Brady

The technical crew were as follows:

Scenic Design : Nesho Dimov

Costume Design : Natasha Djukic

Lighting Design : Keith Parham

Sound Design : Dmitri Shub

Movement Director : Shane O'Hara

Stage Management : Cindy Savage
