= Matka King =

2026 Indian period-crime drama series

- Promotional poster
- Genre: Drama
- Created by: Abhay Koranne; Nagraj Popatrao Manjule
- Written by: Abhay Koranne; Nagraj Popatrao Manjule
- Story by: Ashish Aryan
- Directed by: Nagraj Popatrao Manjule
- Starring: Vijay Varma; Sai Tamhankar; Bhupendra Jadawat; Kritika Kamra; Gulshan Grover; Siddharth Jadhav
- Theme music composer: Ajay Jayanthi
- Opening theme: Matka King - Title Theme
- Composers: Songs: Amit Trivedi; B Prasanna; Parag Chabbra; Score: Ketan Sodha
- Country of origin: India
- Original language: Hindi
- No. of seasons: 1
- No. of episodes: 8

Production
- Executive producers: Rahul Gandhi; Ashwini Sidwani
- Producers: Siddharth Roy Kapur; Nagraj Popatrao Manjule; Gargi Kulkarni; Ashwini Sidwani; Ashish Aryan
- Cinematography: Sudhakar Reddy Yakkanti
- Editor: Nitin Baid
- Running time: 43–62 minutes
- Production companies: Roy Kapur Films; Aatpat Entertainment; SMR Entertainment

Original release
- Network: Amazon Prime Video
- Release: 17 April 2026 – present

Matka King is a 2026 Indian Hindi-language period crime drama television series created by Nagraj Popatrao Manjule and Abhay Koranne based on the story concept by Ashish Aryan for Amazon Prime Video. It stars Vijay Varma, Sai Tamhankar, Bhupendra Jadawat, Kritika Kamra, Gulshan Grover and Siddharth Jadhav in lead roles. Set in the 1960s Mumbai, the series traces the transformation of a humble, enterprising cotton trader into a powerful gambling don as he starts a new game called Matka, that takes the city by storm and democratizes a terrain previously reserved for the rich and elite.

The series is renewed for a second season by Amazon Prime Video which is in development.

== Premise ==
Matka King is a gripping crime drama set in the 1960s Mumbai. The series builds its world around a modest cotton trader, Brij Bhatti, who, starts an illegal "Matka" betting game, showing how a small, almost harmless gambling idea gradually evolves into a massive underground empire that is controlled by money, politics, and fear.

At its core, the show is less about gambling and more about ambition. It explores how greed reshapes a man's morals as he climbs from poverty to power, and how that power slowly begins to destroy everything around him. Vijay Varma delivers a strong and controlled performance, carrying the emotional weight of a man who is both intelligent and deeply flawed.

== Cast ==
- Vijay Varma as Brij Bhatti "Matka King"
- Sai Tamhankar as Barkha Bhatti, Brij's wife
- Bhupendra Jadawat as Laxman "Lachu" Bhatti, Brij's brother
- Kritika Kamra as Gulrukh
- Gulshan Grover as Laljibhai Chaggani
- Siddharth Jadhav as Dagdu Vichare
- Jamie Lever as Sulbha
- Bharat Jadhav as Sub Inspector Eknath Tumbade
- Girish Kulkarni as TP D'Souza
- Kishor Kadam as Minister Prashant Bapat
- Ajay Raju as Police Homeguard
- Ridan Shah as Anmol Bhatti, Brij's son
- Arpita Sethia as Rukmani
- Cyrus Sahukar as Maqsood
- Ishtiyak Khan
- Simran Ashwini as Vasudha, Lalji's daughter
- Samir Trimbakkar as DCP MK Sharma
- Sanjeev Jogtiyani as Editor-in-Chief
- Tanaji Galgunde as Raftaar
- Vineet Kumar Singh as Darab Ahmed Wadkar (special appearance)

== Episodes ==
No.	Title	Directed by	Written by	Original release date
1	"Taqdeer, Tadbeer, Tarkeeb!"	Nagraj Popatrao Manjule	Abhay Koranne, Nagraj Popatrao Manjule	17 April 2026
2	"Umeed Ka Karkhana"	Nagraj Popatrao Manjule	Abhay Koranne, Nagraj Popatrao Manjule	17 April 2026
3	"Izzat Half, Sangam Full"	Nagraj Popatrao Manjule	Abhay Koranne, Nagraj Popatrao Manjule	17 April 2026
4	"Tera Pyaar Triple Paana, Mera Pyaar Kabootar Daana"	Nagraj Popatrao Manjule	Abhay Koranne, Nagraj Popatrao Manjule	17 April 2026
5	"Safed Kapde, Kaale Dil"	Nagraj Popatrao Manjule	Abhay Koranne, Nagraj Popatrao Manjule	17 April 2026
6	"Lights, Camera, Jodi"	Nagraj Popatrao Manjule	Abhay Koranne, Nagraj Popatrao Manjule	17 April 2026
7	"Do Ikke, Ek Gulaam"	Nagraj Popatrao Manjule	Abhay Koranne, Nagraj Popatrao Manjule	17 April 2026
8	"Open Aur Close"	Nagraj Popatrao Manjule	Abhay Koranne, Nagraj Popatrao Manjule	17 April 2026

== Soundtrack ==
Matka King

Soundtrack album
- Released: 10 April 2026
- Genre: Television soundtrack
- Length: 18:23
- Language: Hindi
- Label: Sony Music India

Official audio
- Matka King (Jukebox) on YouTube

Track listing
No.	Title	Lyrics	Music	Singer(s)	Length
1.	"Hoga Savera - Retro"	Kumaar, Shantanu Raina	Amit Trivedi	Simran Choudhary, Shantanu Raina	2:51
2.	"Raasta"	Abhay Koranne, Parag Chhabra	Vineeth Jayan, Mayank Choudhary, Parag Chhabra	Yashika Sikka, Parag Chhabra	3:40
3.	"Dhaaga Dhaaga"	Arushi Kaushal	B Prasanna	Keerthana Vaidyanathan	3:00
4.	"Bhaga Re"	Kumaar	Amit Trivedi, Vaibhav Pani	Amit Trivedi, Jyotsana Vaidya	4:48
5.	"Hoga Savera - Modern"	Kumaar, Shantanu Raina	Amit Trivedi	Simran Choudhary; Shantanu Raina	2:51
6.	"Matka King - Title Theme"	Instrumental	Ajay Jayanthi	Instrumental	1:04
Total length:					18:14

== Release ==
Matka King began streaming on Amazon Prime Video from 17 April 2026.

== Reception ==
Anuj Kumar for The Hindu wrote "‘Matka King’ turns out to be a familiar but gripping crime drama that is worth betting on."

Shubhra Gupta for The Indian Express rated the series 2/5 stars and stated "the matka-addicted mill-workers and their unions whose movement kept Bombay's greedy sharks at bay, remain a scratchy backdrop."

Rahul Desai for The Hollywood Reporter India wrote "Along the way, there are glimpses of the intellect buried within the algorithm."

Deepansh Duggal for The Quint stated "Instead of unfolding organically, the plot feels like it is delivered in bursts, with too much information packed into too little time." Nandini Ramnath for Scroll.in felt that "The eight-episode show suffers from a bit of bloat and threadbare production values." Sana Farzeen of India Today rated the series 3/5 stars and stated "At eight episodes, it feels indulgent."

Tatsam Mukherjee of The Wire expressed "No man-woman pair in the show can do so without falling in love, which I found too escapist and dated." Hardika Gupta from NDTV rated the series 2 out of 5 stars and stated "The result is a story that moves, but rarely surprises; that speaks, but rarely resonates." A reviewer from Amar Ujala rated the series 2.5/5.
