= Blood (2018 TV series) =

2018 British/Irish television series

- Genre: Thriller
- Created by: Sophie Petzal
- Written by: Sophie Petzal
- Directed by: Lisa Mulcahy; Hannah Quinn; Maurice Sweeney; Laura Way
- Starring: Adrian Dunbar; Carolina Main; Gráinne Keenan; Seán Duggan; Diarmuid Noyes; Fiona Bell; Ingrid Craigie; Ian Lloyd Anderson
- Composer: Ray Harman
- Country of origin: Ireland/United Kingdom
- Original language: English
- No. of series: 2
- No. of episodes: 12

Production
- Executive producers: Sophie Petzal; Frank Agnew; Andrew Byrne; Jonathan Fisher; David Swetman; Michele Buck; Shane Murphy; Mark Byrne; Paula Heffernan; Ed Guiney; Andrew Lowe
- Producer: Jonathan Fisher
- Running time: 47–76 minutes
- Production company: Company Pictures

Original release
- Network: Virgin Media One; Channel 5
- Release: 8 October 2018 – present

Blood is a Channel 5 and Virgin Media One psychological thriller, created by Sophie Petzal and starring Carolina Main and Adrian Dunbar. The first series was broadcast in November 2018 and the second series in April–May 2020.

== Synopsis ==
Cat Hogan (Carolina Main) returns home to a fictional small town in the Dublin commuter belt (actually filmed in the Kilcock, Kildare) following the news that her mother, who had been suffering from a long illness, had died after falling over and striking her head against a rock at the family home. Haunted by flashbacks from an incident in her childhood, she is convinced her father had something to do with her mother's death, and her family is torn by suspicion and grief. She begins to question whether her mother's death was an accident.

== Cast ==
- Adrian Dunbar as Dr Jim Hogan
- Carolina Main as Cathleen "Cat" Hogan
- Gráinne Keenan as Fiona Hogan
- Diarmuid Noyes as Michael Hogan
- Ingrid Craigie as Mary Hogan
- Fiona Bell as Gillian Mooney
- Denis Conway as Tom Mooney
- Desmond Eastwood as Owen Mooney
- Ian Lloyd Anderson as Paul Crowley
- Ruby Dunne as Rose Crowley
- James Heffernan as Joseph Crowley
- Seán Duggan as Dez Breen
- Shereen Martin as Sarah

== Production ==
Blood was filmed in counties Meath and Kildare, and in Dublin. The location of the family home was at the Larchill Arcadian Gardens in County Meath.

== Series overview ==
Series	Episodes	Originally released		Avg UK viewership (millions)
Series	Episodes	First released	Last released	Avg UK viewership (millions)
1	6	19 November 2018	23 November 2018	TBA
2	6	27 April 2020	1 May 2020	TBA

=== Series 1 (2018) ===
No. overall	No. in season	Title	Directed by	Written by	Original release date	Viewers (millions)
1	1	"Coming Home"	Lisa Mulcahy	Sophie Petzal	19 November 2018	N/A
The opening episode of a six-part thriller set in rural Ireland. Cat returns to her childhood home in West Meath following the news that her mother, who had been suffering from a long illness has died, supposedly from injuries sustained in a fall. She becomes suspicious of the circumstances surrounding her death - and of her father in particular - and immediately starts asking awkward questions.
2	2	"Secrets and Lies"	Lisa Mulcahy	Sophie Petzal	19 November 2018	N/A
Cat struggles to get her suspicions taken seriously after her mother's mysterious death. She tracks down an old friend from her past who may be able to shed light on the present.
3	3	"The Funeral"	Lisa Mulcahy	Sophie Petzal	20 November 2018	N/A
The day of the funeral arrives and the extended family gather to bury Mary, with tensions high in the wake of their confrontation. Jim re-introduces a strange and distant relative to the household, whom Cat suspects has some very ill intentions
4	4	"Memories"	Hannah Quinn	Sophie Petzal	21 November 2018	N/A
In the aftermath of the funeral, Cat finds herself on the receiving end of Jim's apparent mercy and is forced to confront the question of her own sanity
5	5	"Last Chance"	Hannah Quinn	Sophie Petzal	22 November 2018	N/A
Reeling from the impact of another tragedy, Cat is presented with a dark choice to make, depending on whether she seeks the truth or revenge.
6	6	"The Truth"	Hannah Quinn	Sophie Petzal	23 November 2018	N/A
Jim finally tells Cat the truth. The truth is finally revealed in a series of flashbacks to the days leading up to Mary's death. The episode flashes back to the days before Mary's death, Jim looks after Mary with kindness and tenderness - showing an apparent different side to his character. Garda Breen investigates the robbery of Jim's elderly patient, Rita, and aware Jim was at Rita's house the night before asks Sarah to arrange for Jim to give an official statement. At the Hogan home, Mary discovers a bag stuffed full of money and confronts Jim about it. Jim confesses that he took Rita's cash and begs Mary's forgiveness, before Mary devastates him with a shocking ultimatum.

=== Series 2 (2020) ===
No. overall	No. in season	Title	Directed by	Written by	Original release date	UK viewers (millions)
7	1	"Deep Water"	Maurice Sweeney	Sophie Petzal	27 April 2020	N/A
Jim Hogan returns home after a year away to find his daughter Fiona ailing. Detective Dez Breen arrives with news of a disturbing discovery.
8	2	"Grave Digging"	Maurice Sweeney	Sophie Petzal	28 April 2020	N/A
As Fiona is brought in for questioning over the discovery of her husband's body, there is a flashback to the events of the preceding weeks.
9	3	"Where This Has Led"	Maurice Sweeney	Sophie Petzal	29 April 2020	N/A
Detective Dez Breen continues with his interrogation of Fiona. Paul is faced with an impossible decision: will he follow Kian's orders and assist with the theft of Gillian's prized horse, or will he stay loyal to his friends? Following a failed job interview, Jim spends the day with Fiona and the kids.
10	4	"Communion"	Laura Way	Sophie Petzal	30 April 2020	N/A
On the day of Paul and Fiona's twins First Communion, Paul is nowhere to be found, but shows up just in time to attend the ceremony. Later at the pub he and Jim go off to take care of another matter while the three adult siblings reunite.
11	5	"Can't Repeat the Past"	Laura Way	Sophie Petzal	1 May 2020	N/A
Fiona's plan to leave with Gillian and her children hits a snag. Later the Garda's focus on Paul's death shifts to Jim, whose suspicious activities with Paul are hard to explain without further incrimination
12	6	"What We Sow"	Laura Way	Sophie Petzal	1 May 2020	N/A
Paul's insecurities cause him to lash out at those closest to him, which results in his death.

== Indian adaptation ==
On 28 March 2022, it was announced Disney+ Hotstar would produce an Indian adaptation of Blood. The series, titled Masoom, is directed by Gurmmeet Singh and debuted on 17 June 2022.
