= Ittu Si Baat =

2022 Indian Hindi-language romantic-comedy film

- Theatrical release poster
- Directed by: Adnan Ali
- Screenplay by: Kamal Shukla
- Story by: Adnan Ali
- Produced by: Narendra Hirawat, Shreyans Hirawat (NH Studioz). Laxman Utekar & Karishma Sharma (Kathputli Creations)
- Starring: Bhupendra Jadawat; Gayatri Bhardwaj; Dheerendra Gautam; Ravi Chauhan; Farida Jalal
- Cinematography: Rajan Sohani
- Edited by: Manish Pradhan
- Music by: Vishal Mishra
- Production companies: NH Studioz; Kathputli Creations
- Distributed by: NH Studioz
- Release date: 17 June 2022
- Country: India
- Language: Hindi

Ittu Si Baat is an Indian Hindi-language romantic-comedy film on Prime video directed by Adnan Ali and produced by Narendrat Hirawat and Laxman Utekar.The film stars Bhupendra Jadawat, Gayatri Bhardwaj, Dheerendra Gautam, Ravi Chauhan and Farida Jalal. The film was released on 17 June 2022.

== Plot ==
Bittu Shukla, a simple and good-hearted boy, lives in the small town of Chunar, near Varanasi. He dreams of becoming a cricketer and lives a modest life with his family. Bittu has secretly been in love with his childhood friend Sapna for years but has never confessed his feelings.

Sapna, on the other hand, is a modern and ambitious girl. She has her own dreams and desires a lifestyle that includes things like owning an iPhone, which becomes symbolic of her aspirations. During a casual conversation, she tells her friends that any guy who gifts her an iPhone is worthy of being her boyfriend.

Bittu overhears this and becomes determined to fulfill her wish. Despite coming from a humble background and facing financial difficulties, he starts working odd jobs and goes to great lengths to save money for the phone. His love is innocent, and his actions stem from a deep desire to make Sapna happy.

Throughout the film, we see Bittu's struggles — from dealing with his parents’ concerns, balancing his cricket dreams, and facing societal judgments — all while trying to gather the money without Sapna knowing his intentions.

Meanwhile, Sapna is unaware of the sacrifices Bittu is making for her and begins to grow closer to another guy who appears to be more affluent and worldly. This creates emotional tension and heartbreak for Bittu.

In the climax, just when Bittu is about to gift her the phone, Sapna realizes the depth of his love and his honesty. She sees through the superficiality of the materialistic world she was leaning towards. Moved by Bittu's sincerity and selflessness, she begins to value his affection more than any expensive gift.

The film ends on a heartwarming note, with Sapna accepting Bittu’s love, not because of the iPhone, but because she finally understands how genuine his feelings are.

== Cast ==
- Bhupendra Jadawat as Bittu Shukla
- Gayatri Bhardwaj as Sapna Mathur
- Priyansh Jora as Vicky Sharma
- Dheerendra Gautam as Cheeku
- Ravi Kumar as Salman
- Farida Jalal as Dadi
- Atul Shrivastav as Pradeep Shukla, Bittu's Father
- Sapna Sand as Sumitra Shukla, Bittu's Mother
- Ayushi Lahiri as Nandini Shukla, Bittu's Sister
- Neeraj Sood as Sanjay Mathur, Sapna's Father
- Sonali Sachdev as Pushpa Mathur, Sapna's Mother

== Production ==
The principal photography commenced March 2021 in Chunar, Varanasi. Ittu Si Baat is scheduled for a theatrical release on 17 June 2022.

== Music ==
The music of the film is composed by Vishal Mishra and lyrics written by Raj Shekhar.

Tracklist
No.	Title	Lyrics	Singer(s)	Length
1.	"Gulabi"	Raj Shekhar	Vishal Mishra, Shreya Ghoshal	4:08
2.	"Sun Bhi Le"	Raj Shekhar	Arijit Singh, Vishal Mishra	4:23
3.	"17 Lakh Ka Gajra"	Raj Shekhar	Tony Kakkar, Asees Kaur, Vishal Mishra	2:41
4.	"Darbadar"	Raj Shekhar	Jubin Nautiyal	2:46
