= Shalini Pandey =

Indian actress (born 1993)

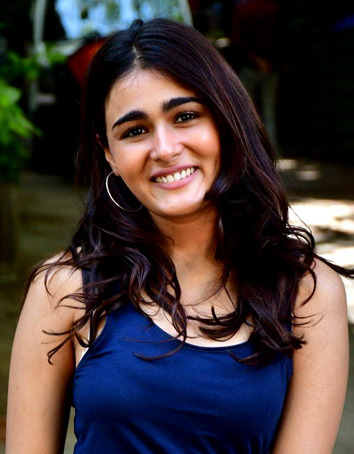
- Pandey in 2023
- Born: 23 September 1993 (age 33); Jabalpur, Madhya Pradesh, India
- Occupation: Actress
- Years active: 2016–present

Shalini Pandey (born 23 September 1993) is an Indian actress who works in Telugu, Hindi and Tamil films. Pandey made her screen debut in the Telugu film Arjun Reddy (2017). She has since appeared in the Tamil film 100% Kadhal (2019), the Telugu films Mahanati (2018) and 118 (2019), and the Hindi films Jayeshbhai Jordaar (2022), Maharaj (2024) and web series Dabba Cartel (2025).

== Early life ==
Pandey was born on 23 September 1993 in Jabalpur, Madhya Pradesh. Before making her acting debut, Pandey worked as a theatre artist in Jabalpur.

== Career ==
=== Breakthrough (2017–2019) ===
Pandey made her screen debut with the Telugu film Arjun Reddy in 2017, where she played a medical student opposite Vijay Deverakonda. A major commercial success, the film earned her the SIIMA Award for Best Female Debut – Telugu nomination. Hemanth Kumar of Firstpost noted, "Shalini as Preethi, is good and it's the vulnerability that she encapsulates that makes the love story so intense". In her first film of 2018, Pandey made her Hindi film debut with a cameo appearance in Meri Nimmo. The same year, she had a supporting role in the Telugu film Mahanati, a major box office success.

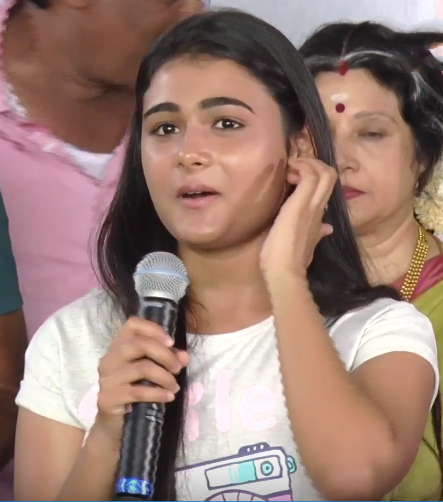
Pandey at the launch of 100% Kadhal in 2019

Pandey had five film releases in 2019. She first played Sowcar Janaki in the Telugu film NTR: Kathanayakudu. She then played the lead in the Telugu film 118, opposite Nandamuri Kalyan Ram. The film was a commercial success. Neeshita Nyayapati of The Times of India found her performance to be adequate in the role but was more appreciate of her chemistry with Ram. Later the year, Pandey made her Tamil film debut with 100% Kadhal, playing a college student opposite G. V. Prakash Kumar. It emerged as a box office failure. In her next Tamil film, she played the lead opposite Jiiva in Gorilla. In her final film of the year, she played a college student opposite Raj Tarun in the Telugu film Iddari Lokam Okate, a box office average.

=== Career expansion (2020–present) ===
In 2020, Pandey starred in Bamfaad, a romantic action film in which she played a Hindu girl who becomes romantically involved with a Muslim boy (played by Aditya Rawal). Anna MM Vetticad of Firspost found her to be "efficient" but added that she lacks "spark". That year, she also starred in the Telugu film Nishabdham. Sowmya Rajendran of The News Minute wrote that she was "a surprise as the possessive Sonali. She's meant to be annoying yet likable. A tough ask, but Shalini pulls it off".

Pandey portrayed a Gujarati housewife opposite Ranveer Singh in the 2022 Hindi film Jayeshbhai Jordaar, a comedy about female infanticide. It emerged as a box-office bomb. In a negative review of the film, Rediff.com's Sukanya Verma wrote that Pandey "piggy backs entirely on Ranveer Singh's feminism to leave any impact." Following a two-year hiatus, she had a brief role opposite Junaid Khan in the 2024 Hindi film Maharaj, that was released directly on to Netflix. Pratikshya Mishra of The Quint opined that she "pulls her weight" in a short but important role.

In 2025, Pandey starred in the Netflix series Dabba Cartel, which tells the story of a group of women operating a drug cartel under the guise of a food delivery company. Hindustan Times's Abhimanyu Mathur wrote that despite her earnest efforts, Pandey was constrained by a role that "allows her to do very little apart from looking helpless". She will next appear alongside Dhanush in Idli Kadai.

== Media image ==
Pandey was placed in The Indian Express and 123telugu, "Top Actresses" list of 2017. In the same year, she was also placed 19th in Hyderabad Times Most Desirable Women List.

== Filmography ==
=== Films ===
Key
†	Denotes films that have not yet been released

Year	Title	Role	Language	Notes	Ref.
2017	Arjun Reddy	Dr. Preethi Shetty	Telugu		
2018	Meri Nimmo	Nimmo's friend	Hindi		
2018	Mahanati	Suseela	Telugu		
2019	NTR: Kathanayakudu	Sowcar Janaki	Telugu	Cameo Appearance	
2019	118	Megha	Telugu		
2019	100% Kadhal	Mahalakshmi	Tamil		
2019	Gorilla	Jhansi	Tamil		
2019	Iddari Lokam Okate	Varsha	Telugu		
2020	Bamfaad	Neelam	Hindi		
2020	Nishabdham	Sonali	Telugu		
2022	Jayeshbhai Jordaar	Mudra Patel	Hindi		
2024	Maharaj	Kishori	Hindi		
2025	Idli Kadai	Meera	Tamil		
2026	Rahu Ketu	Meenu Taxi	Hindi		

=== Television ===
Year	Title	Role	Notes	Ref.
2016	Man Mein Hai Visshwas	Saumya	Episode 21	
2017	Crime Patrol	Vineeta	Episode: "The Kidnapping"	
2025–present	Dabba Cartel	Raji Jagtap		
2026	Bandwaale	Mariam		

=== Music video appearances ===
Year	Title	Singer	Ref.
2022	"Nakhrey Nakhrey"	Armaan Malik	

== Discography ==
Year	Song	Co-singer(s)	Notes	Ref.
2018	"Naa Pranamay"	Tejas Shankar	Along with Lagori Band	

== Awards and nominations ==
Year	Award	Category	Film	Result	Ref.
2017	Zee Cine Awards Telugu	Best Debut Actress	Arjun Reddy	Won	
2018	Sakshi Excellence Awards	Most Popular Actress of the Year	Arjun Reddy	Won	
2018	South Indian International Movie Awards	Best Female Debut – Telugu	Arjun Reddy	Nominated	
2018	Zee Telugu Apsara Awards	Debut Heroine of the Year	Arjun Reddy	Nominated	
2018	Zee Telugu Apsara Awards	Best Find of the Year	Arjun Reddy	Won	
2025	Iconic Gold Awards	Best Popular Actress – OTT	Maharaj	Won	
2025	Times of India Film Awards	Acting Excellence in a Supporting Role (Female) – Web Film	Maharaj	Won	
