= Bamfaad =

2020 film directed by Ranjan Chandal

- Official release poster
- Directed by: Ranjan Chandel
- Written by: Hanzalah Shahid; Ranjan Chandel
- Produced by: Ajay G Rai; Pradeep Kumar
- Starring: Aditya Rawal; Shalini Pandey; Vijay Varma
- Cinematography: Piyush Puty
- Edited by: Nitesh Bhatia
- Music by: Vishal Mishra
- Distributed by: ZEE5
- Release date: 10 April 2020
- Country: India
- Language: Hindi

Bamfaad (lit. 'Explosive') is a 2020 Indian romantic action film directed by Ranjan Chandel starring Aditya Rawal and Shalini Pandey in their first lead film. The film was released on 10 April 2020. It is a passionate love story set in Allahabad between Nasir Jamal and Neelam who meet accidentally and fall in love. They make brave choices and go through a path of love and loss to be with each other.

== Plot ==
Nasir Jamal (Aditya Rawal) is a teenage boy and resident of the Kareli area in Allahabad (Uttar Pradesh). His friends call him 'Naate' despite him being quite tall. Naate brings home complaints regularly. His father, Shahid Jamal, a reputed contractor, overlooks his son's deeds and, in turn, encourages his behaviour for the worse while his mother is worried sick about her son and his carelessness.

One evening, Nasir goes to drop off a parcel at Sanam CD Music shop on his childhood friend Zahid's request. There, he finds the shop closed and meets a young girl, Neelam (Shalini Pandey), who lives right above the shop. An interesting conversation takes place between them. Soon after, they happen to meet a few more times, and Naate is now drawn to her. On the other hand, while Neelam appreciates Nasir's genuine gestures towards her, she is hesitant to take things forward. Having had a tough journey, she battles to make things work with Nasir, but he is too lighthearted about it all to see any red flags.

While Nasir and Neelam get closer, Jigar Fareedi (Vijay Varma), a seemingly charming, influential person, crosses paths with Nasir on account of his fight with Rajeeb Mehndi, a college student politician who is Jigar's candidate. Jigar demands that Nasir make a public apology and is arrogantly turned down, leading to the beginning of an ego conflict between the two.

Neelam struggles to understand her relationship with Nasir but is unaware of how much she has grown to like him. They face multiple obstacles and are presented with testing times.

== Cast ==
- Aditya Rawal as Nasir Jamal
- Shalini Pandey as Neelam
- Vijay Varma as Jigar Fareedi
- Jatin Sarna as Zahid
- Sana Amin Sheikh as Walia

== Production ==
=== Scripting ===
Director Ranjan met his co-writer, Hanzalah Shahid, after coming back from the shoot of the film 'Mukkabaaz'. Hanzalah gave him a script to read of a different title. Ranjan read the script and got fascinated by some characters of that world which inspired him to dwell more into that world. He took those characters and some incidents and started writing a new draft from the scratch of the script and titled it 'Bamfaad'. Bamfaad is a north Indian slang which portrays a certain energy and it means "Explosive" or "Kickass".

=== Filming ===
The principal photography of the film began on 2 September 2018 in Unnao, and the film was wrapped on 22 October 2018 in Lucknow. The shooting of the film was finished in 45 days.

== Soundtrack ==
The soundtrack is composed by Vishal Mishra, and the lyrics are written by Raj Shekhar.

The film contains Suryakant Tripathi 'Nirala' - Baadal Raag, composed and sung by Harpreet Singh. It describes the journey of a thundercloud. Ranjan found the composition as a passionate composition of a compelling poem.

| No. | Title | Lyrics | Singer(s) | Length |
|---|---|---|---|---|
| 1. | "Bamfaad (Title Track)" | Raj Shekhar | Vishal Mishra | 2:07 |
| 2. | "Ishq Ka Itar" | Raj Shekhar | Vishal Mishra | 4:49 |
| 3. | "Munasib" | Raj Shekhar | Vishal Mishra Aanandi Joshi | 4:00 |
| 4. | "Yaar Mera Ho Mere Rubabu" | Raj Shekhar | Sukhwinder Singh Vishal Mishra Hemant Brijwasi Moin Sabri | 7:50 |
| Total length: | | | | 18:46 |

== Reception ==
GQ India mentioned Bamfaad in the top 7 films on Streaming platforms.

Poet Kumar Vishwas appreciated the film and actor's performances and especially mentioned the composition of "Nirala" Baadal Raag by the debutant director Ranjan Chandel as a pleasant surprise.

Subhash K. Jha said, "The violent love story had me rooting for young lovers, solid performances, confident direction and an enticing arch in the storytelling. Bamfaad is a crackerjack rough-com."

Film Critic Shubhra Gupta wrote in The Indian Express - "Bamfaad brings back memories of the small-town love story that Bollywood used to tell, and keeps us watching with a fluid flourish or two, even if we wish for much more freshness, as it takes us to a fully filmi end."

Film Critic Anna MM Vetticad wrote in First Post - "True to its title, Bamfaad has a fiery start. The striking introduction melds realism, humour and an earthy song. She mentioned, "The second half of Bamfaad does not live up to the promise of the pre-interval portion. Still, the director Ranjan Chandel and Writer Hanzalah Shahid are talents to watch out for. For one, in this era of stereotype-ridden, Islamophobic Bollywood rants, it is nice to see a film in which the protagonist is a Muslim, but is not given any stereotypical markers of the religion, and members of the community are treated as regular humans: some good, some not, some evil, some not". She also mentioned, "Besides, how can one not make a note of artists who can conceptualise a scene in which a love-lorn youth gazing at the object of his affection tells her that pimples look good on her face? He does not say "even pimples", he simply says "pimples". Oh, the sweet innocence of those words! Because of course on her they are an adornment, not a skin eruption – "that dress looks good on you", "the new hairstyle looks good on you", "pimples look good on you".
