= Bhupendra Jadawat =

Indian actor (born 1996)

- Born: 26 August 1996 (age 30); Kota, India
- Education: National School of Drama (2017)
- Occupations: Actor; Scriptwriter
- Years active: 2014–present
- Works: Matka King, Dabba Cartel, Ittu Si Baat, Class of '83
- Awards: Alyque Padamsee Award (2018)
- Website: Bhupendra Jadawat on Instagram

Bhupendra Singh Jadawat (born 26 August 1996) is an Indian actor and model notable for his works in Hindi films and series. He is known for starring in Ittu Si Baat (2022) and Dabba Cartel (2025) , Matka King (2026) Modern Love: Mumbai (2022) as well as Class of '83 (2020) for which he was nominated as the Best Supporting Actor for the 2021 Filmfare OTT Awards.

== Early life ==
Bhupendra Jadawat was born on 26 August 1996, in Kota, Rajasthan. He spent his formative years in Kota and graduated from Rajasthan University in Jaipur and is also an alumnus of the National School of Drama (2017 batch).

== Career ==
Bhupendra Jadawat always wanted to be an actor and learn the craft from scratch. He joined a theatre group in Jaipur, then attended the National School of Drama. After that, he formed his own theatre group called 'The Red Mark', did plays, commercials, and eventually made his screen debut.

After graduating from National School of Drama, he has been a part of the Prithvi Plays. He acted as well directed the play titled Man Mana Square for which he won the Best Actor Award at the Thespo Festival. His first major movie role was in Class of '83 (2020) for which he has bagged his First Nomination for Filmfare Awards; and has subsequently starred in Shonali Bose's Modern Love Mumbai (2021) anthology episode titled Raat Rani and Ittu Si Baat (2022).

=== Awards ===
In 2025, Jadawat received the [Rajasthan Pravasi Samman] from the Government of Rajasthan in recognition of his work in film and theatre.

- Alyque Padamsee Award for Outstanding Male Actor (for 'Man Mana Square')
- Rashtrapati Award in Scouting 2009 for Cultural Activities.

== Filmography ==
=== Film ===
Year	Title	Role	Notes
2023	Radhan	Ujjwal	Short film
2022	Ittu Si Baat	Bittu	
2022	Stories on the Next Page		Short film
2020	Class of '83	Pramod Shukla	
2020	Pondicherry		
2019	Sailing Through Life		
2018	Destiny	Derek	Short film

=== Television ===
Year	Title	Role	Notes
2025	Dabba Cartel	Hari	Netflix web series
2023	Aarya3	Dhruv	
2022	Modern Love: Mumbai	Lutfi	Anthology
2015	Kota Junction		

=== Theatre ===
Year	Play	Role	Notes
2014	My Father My Mom (Gibberish Language play)		Directed by Rajendra Panchal
2018	Man Mana Square		Actor, director
2023	NaagMandal		Actor, Directed by JaiHind kumar
