= Destiny (2018 film) =

2018 Hindi language romantic comedy

- Directed by: Vikkramm Chandirramani
- Written by: Vikkramm Chandirramani
- Produced by: Quest Mercury Intermedia
- Starring: Nikita Vijayvargia; Bhupendra Jadawat; Monika Panwar; Jagriti Singh
- Release date: 28 March 2018
- Running time: 14 minutes
- Country: India
- Language: Hindi

Destiny is a 2018 Indian romantic drama comedy short film written & directed by Vikkramm Chandirramani and produced by Quest Mercury Intermedia. It was released on 28 March 2018 on their official YouTube channel.

== Plot ==
Tanya, a woman in her twenties is at home getting dressed to meet Derek, a young man she has met twice. Her friend Richa browses his pictures on social media and expresses her ire at being told about him only after Tanya has met him twice. Tanya expresses her doubts about Derek and seems unsure about where things are going. She seems to have developed a fondness for Derek. As Richa teases her friend, Derek calls up and cancels the date. Tanya is hurt and does not take this well. Despite Richa trying to talk her out of it, Tanya decides to get even with Derek. Tanya then catfishes Derek by creating multiple fake dating profiles and not showing up. While the two have a laugh at this, Richa tries to talk Tanya out of taking this too far. Tanya however wants to play one last prank on Derek. She creates a dating profile pretending to be a Russian model and entices him to come to a cafe which is a four-hour drive from where he is, the next morning. Tanya and Richa show up at the cafe and surreptitiously watch Derek standing outside the cafe as the woman he is to meet does not show up, yet again. After a while Derek turns to walk into the cafe and trips at the entrance. As the two women burst into peals of laughter, Derek gets up, brushes off the dust and takes a seat. Seated diagonally across is a young woman who points out that he has hurt himself and is bleeding at his temple. Derek wipes the blood and remarks that it just is not his lucky day. To this the young woman asks him if he believes in luck. Derek responds with 'I do' and we see him exchanging vows with the same woman at a beach. We further see a disappointed Tanya watching a video of both of them getting married, presumably on social media on her laptop. She then folds the laptop and the film ends.

== Reception and awards ==
Destiny was awarded 'Best Foreign Film' at The Ridgewood Guild International Film Festival. It was also awarded 'Best Short Film' at the MedFF. It received largely positive reviews. Nimisha Menon of Indie Shorts Mag praised the film saying, "Vikkramm Chandirramani’s direction is unique, from translating the script to screen and egging the characters to bring out their best, his work is sure to leave you rooting for his next!" IndyRed.com lauded the film describing it as a 'well done production all around' and a 'a playful delight'. Siraj Syed writing for FilmFestivals.com termed it 'fresh and watchable'. On 5 May 2018, Destiny was screened at the NCCC Film and Animation Festival, run by Niagara County Community College. It was screened at the Jagran Film Festival, Allahabad on 21 July 2018. It was the opening film at The Endless Mountains Film Festival, Pennsylvania on 14 September 2018. Since its release, Destiny has clocked 4.3 million views on YouTube.
