= Subedaar (film) =

- Official release poster
- Directed by: Suresh Triveni
- Written by: Suresh Triveni; Prajwal Chandrashekar
- Produced by: Vikram Malhotra; Anil Kapoor; Suresh Triveni
- Starring: Anil Kapoor; Radhika Madan; Khushbu Sundar; Saurabh Shukla; Aditya Rawal; Mona Singh; Faisal Malik
- Cinematography: Ayan Saxena
- Edited by: Shivkumar V. Panicker
- Production companies: Abundantia Entertainment; Opening Image Films; Anil Kapoor Film & Communication Network
- Distributed by: Amazon Prime Video
- Release date: 5 March 2026
- Running time: 142 minutes
- Country: India
- Language: Hindi

Subedaar (transl. Governor) is a 2026 Indian Hindi-language action drama film directed by Suresh Triveni. The film stars Anil Kapoor in the titular role, alongside Radhika Madan, Khushbu Sundar, Saurabh Shukla, Aditya Rawal, Mona Singh, and Faisal Malik with Nana Patekar in a special appearance. Produced by Abundantia Entertainment, Opening Image Films, and Anil Kapoor Film & Communication Network, the film premiered on Amazon Prime Video on 5 March 2026. It was the final film of Patekar during his lifetime and before his death on 8 October 2026.

== Synopsis ==
Subedaar Arjun Maurya, a retired soldier, is struggling to adapt to civilian life in a rapidly changing world. Set against the backdrop of Madhya Pradesh, the narrative explores Arjun's battle against local corruption and societal dysfunction while attempting to mend a fractured relationship with his daughter, Shyama. As he confronts enemies within his community, situations start turning at a very fast pace. Two parallel context move in the film, one related with Arjun Maurya's open war against the local mafias and other related with his daughter Shyama's struggles. In the background, the struggle related with Arjun's wife and her death is also chronicled. In a rather predicted manner, in the end, it is the victory of the good over evil, with Arjun and his daughter overcoming their respective enemies.

== Cast ==
- Anil Kapoor as Subedaar Arjun Maurya
- Radhika Madan as Shyama Maurya, Arjun's daughter
- Khushbu Sundar as Sudha Devi, Arjun's wife
- Saurabh Shukla as Prabhakar, Arjun's best friend
- Aditya Rawal as Shashikant alias "Prince"
- Mona Singh as Babli Didi
- Faisal Malik as Softy Bhaiyya
- Mohit Tiwari as Rajan, Shyama's boyfriend
- Nana Patekar as Lance Naik Nana Waghmare (Special appearance)

== Production ==
=== Development ===
The film marks another collaboration between director Suresh Triveni and Amazon Prime Video, following his work on Jalsa and the series Daldal. The screenplay was co-written by Triveni and Prajwal Chandrashekar. Anil Kapoor described the role as a return to his action roots, noting that he took inspiration from his real-life relationships to portray the father-daughter dynamic.

=== Filming ===
Principal photography began in October 2024 and was completed by December 2024.

== Music ==
The film's promotional campaign featured the "Lalla Anthem," a track featuring Anil Kapoor and former cricketer Harbhajan Singh. A second promo for the anthem featured cricketer Shikhar Dhawan alongside Kapoor.

== Reception ==
On the review aggregator website Rotten Tomatoes, 69% of 13 critics' reviews are positive, with an average rating of 6.2/10.

Rahul Desai of The Hollywood Reporter India writes that "Suresh Triveni’s 142-minute action drama is not a smooth watch, but it thrives on the subtext of a familiar template and Anil Kapoor Sparkles as a Desi John Wick. Shubhra Gupta of Indian Express gave 2.5 stars out of 5 and said that " Subedaar reminds me of the kind of old-fashioned crime thriller fronted by a hero clashing with the corrupt system, and individuals, that used to give mainstream Bollywood its heft."

Anuj Kumar of The Hindu writes that "After a gripping, vividly tense buildup, director Suresh Triveni resorts to familiar tropes of larger-than-life heroism, undermining the film’s grounded promise" Aishwarya Vasudevan of OTT Play rated 2.5/5 stars and said that "Anil Kapoor’s soulful performance can't save Subedaar, a gritty yet formulaic drama about a veteran fighting a sand mafia. It relies on dated tropes and a predictable screenplay."

Sana Farzeen of India Today gave 2.5 stars out of 5 and writes that "Suresh Triveni-directed Subedaar doesn’t feel like a bad film as much as an overcrowded one — packed with ideas, but without the space to let any of them truly land." Rishabh Suri of Hindustan Times gave 3.5 stars out of 5 and stated that "Anil Kapoor shines in action as well as acting in this massy entertainer, which promises a lot, but does not deliver it all."

Deepa Gahlot of Rediff.com rated it 2.5/5 stars and observed that "What Subedaar lacks is that element of surprise that makes a film worth the viewer’s time and willingness to engage." Nandini Ramnath of Scroll.in commented that "142-minute Subedaar plots itself into a corner. The overwritten script, which proceeds on two tracks and then several, can’t quite bring all its strands together."

"Bollywood Hangama" said Subedaar had a massy first half but a weak second, while "Movie Talkies" called it a Rigorous Anil Kapoor Let Down by a Disappointing Script.
