= 100% Kadhal =

2019 film directed by MM Chandramouli

- Theatrical release poster
- Directed by: M. M. Chandramouli
- Screenplay by: M. M. Chandramouli
- Story by: Sukumar
- Based on: 100% love (Telugu)(2011)
- Produced by: Bhuvana Chandramouli
- Starring: G. V. Prakash Kumar; Shalini Pandey
- Cinematography: Ganesh Rajavelu
- Edited by: Mu. Kasi Viswanathan
- Music by: G. V. Prakash Kumar
- Production companies: Creative Cinemas NY; NJ Entertainment
- Release date: 4 October 2019
- Running time: 151 Minutes
- Country: India
- Language: Tamil

100% Kadhal (transl. 100% Love) is a 2019 Indian romantic comedy film directed by Chandramouli and starring G. V. Prakash Kumar and Shalini Pandey in the leading roles. A remake of the Telugu film 100% Love (2011), the film began production in October 2017. The film was released on 4 October 2019.

== Plot ==
The story starts at a bar where Balu is in a wedding outfit and just enters as he orders his drink, two people tell him to go and get married, while they are talking about debts Balu does fast calculations and impresses them. They ask him to tell his story and he does.

Balu is always top-ranked in his college. Mahalakshmi, his cousin comes to Balu's house to continue her studies. She is in awe of her Mr. Perfect 'mama' as she expresses this after seeing him. Upon seeing Mahalakshmi Balu asks for her name to which she responds as Veera Venkata Sathya Sai Durga devi Seetha Mahalakshmi, Balu says her name is too long and he can't waste that much memory just to remember her name so she says that he will just call her Mahalakshmi. Mahalakshmi takes her first exam and walks out crying as she doesn't understand English, Balu helps her, and she gets the first rank and Balu gets second. Balu is hurt by this as he usually gets first rank, and he plans to sabotage her studies, Mahalakshmi does the same. But to their surprise Ajay stands first this time. Meanwhile, Mahalakshmi's father brings her a marriage proposal, but she doesn't want to marry him. Balu and Mahalakshmi compromise by agreeing to help each other. Balu helps her in getting the proposal canceled and Mahalakshmi distracts Ajay from studies for the sake of Balu, but Balu gets attracted to her. The couple start studying together and Mahalakshmi distracts Ajay. Balu gets first rank and is awarded a building from his principal, at the housewarming party, Mahalakshmi says Ajay is great as he studied well even though Mahalakshmi distracted him. Balu is hurt by this statement because he doesn't want Mahalakshmi to think anyone is better than him, his ego is also hurt and the couple chooses to separate.

After three years, they meet again in the hospital because their grandmother suddenly falls ill. While trying to find out how Balu is doing, Mahalakshmi realizes he hasn't changed at all. Both argue a lot until their parents try to get them married. Surprisingly, Balu mentions that he has a girlfriend named Swapna that he hopes to marry. While introducing her to his family, Mahalakshmi notices that Swapna is much more than she is. To get back at Balu, she agrees to marry Ajay, Balu's former rival in college. Ajay turns out to be the head of a company that makes more than Balu's company. Balu, angry that Ajay is greater than he is, puts his company in risk in hopes that he can surpass Ajay's company. Unfortunately, his partner cheats him, and Balu is on the verge of losing his company. Mahalakshmi, now his project manager, toils to rescue him. They make an excellent team and Balu's company is saved.

In an after party, Balu credits Mahalakshmi for his success. She again unknowingly hurts Balu's ego. This time, Balu confesses that he felt the need to be great in Mahalakshmi's eyes because he loved her. When she tells him she shares his feelings, Balu refuses to believe her. After the interference of their grandfather, they are united in the end.

== Cast ==
- G. V. Prakash Kumar as Balu Mahendra
- Shalini Pandey as Veera Venkata Sathya Sai Naaga Durga Devi Seetha Mahalakshmi (Mahalakshmi)
- Shivani Patel as Swapna
- Yuvan Mayilsamy as Ajay
- Nassar as Balu Mahendra, Balu and Mahalakshmi's grandfather
- Jayachitra as Mahalakshmi, Balu and Mahalakshmi's grandmother
- Thambi Ramaiah as Robert Ramaiyya Ramasamy, Balu and Mahalakshmi's uncle
- Thalaivasal Vijay as Subramani, Balu's father
- Rekha as Aruna, Balu's mother
- R. V. Udayakumar as Krishna, Mahalakshmi's father
- Appukutty as Appu
- Manobala as University Dean
- Chaams as Mahalakshmi's Prospective Bridegroom
- Rekha Suresh as Ajay's mother
- Sriram as Bartender
- Puja Sharma in a cameo appearance
- Faizan as Result Kumar

== Production ==
In early May 2017, G. V. Prakash Kumar signed on to appear in the Tamil remake of the Telugu film 100% Love, with the film's original director Sukumar turning producer for the Tamil version. Directed by Chandramouli, the film was revealed to have cinematography by Dudley and music composed by Prakash Kumar himself. For the leading female role of an undergraduate student, the team held discussion with Hindi actress Shraddha Kapoor, but she was not interested in working on the film. The team then considered and approached Tamannaah Bhatia to reprise her leading role from the original film, though she declined the offer. Likewise, Sayyeshaa Saigal also turned down the offer. In early June 2017, the team held discussions with Lavanya Tripathi for the lead role, before finalising Hebah Patel for the role. In a turn of events, Hebah was replaced by Lavanya in late June 2017 as she became available and the makers found her most suitable for "to pull off the look of an undergraduate student". In addition to the two lead actors, the cast finalised also included Nassar, Livingston, Ambika and comedians Yogi Babu and Sathish. It was revealed that the film would mostly be shot in London and about ten percent of the film will be shot in India, with production beginning in August 2017 under the title of 100% Kadhal.

The start of the film's first schedule was delayed from August to September 2017 as a result of Lavanya's commitment to a Telugu film directed by Parasuram starring Vijay Devarakonda. Chandramouli had intervened and requested the makers of that film to allow Lavanya to work on 100% Kadhal, following which Lavanya was dropped from the Telugu film despite having shot for several weeks. Unhappy with Chandramouli's interference, Lavanya withdrew from 100% Kadhal in mid-September and was replaced by Shalini Pandey, who had previously appeared in the Telugu film Arjun Reddy (2017).

After a promotional shoot held in September 2017, the film began production in Chennai during mid-October 2017. In a turn of events, cinematographer Dudley was replaced by Ganesh Rajavelu, while Mu. Kasi Viswanathan and Thota Tharani handled the editing and art direction respectively. The film completed its shoot in August 2018, and thereafter began post-production work.

== Soundtrack ==
100% Kadhal

Soundtrack album by G. V. Prakash Kumar
- Genre: Film soundtrack
- Length: 36:16
- Language: Tamil
- Label: Sony Music

G. V. Prakash Kumar chronology
Watchman (2019)	100% Kadhal (2019)	Asuran (2019)

The soundtrack for 100% Kadhal was composed by G. V. Prakash Kumar.

Track listing
No.	Title	Lyrics	Singer(s)	Length
1.	"Kannum Kannum Plus"	Mohanrajan	G. V. Prakash Kumar, Maalavika Sundar	4:26
2.	"Oru Vaanam"	Mohanrajan	G. V. Prakash Kumar, Andrea Jeremiah	4:10
3.	"Yeanadi Yeanadi"	Mohanrajan	Keshav Vinod	5:22
4.	"Oh Balu"	Mohanrajan	Sudharshan Ashok, Suchith Suresan	3:39
5.	"Nenjamellam Nindrayae"	Mohanrajan	Vijay Prakash	3:26
6.	"Thiru Thiru Ganatha"	Mohanrajan	Harini	4:55
7.	"A Square B Square Male Version"	Mohanrajan	Meghdeep Bose	2:31
Total length:				36.16

== Release ==
The film finished post-production in mid-2018 and the makers prepared the film for release on 4 October 2019 and became a box office failure.
