= Mairead McKinley =

Northern Irish actress

- Born: Newry, County Down, Northern Ireland
- Occupation: Actress
- Spouse: Husband
- Children: 1
- Awards: TMA Award for Best Actress in a Supporting Role; 2002 The Clearing; Cinéma Tout Ecran Award for Best Actress; 2005 Molly's Way; Ourense Film Festival Award for Best Actress; 2005 Molly's Way; Valdivia International Film Festival award for Best Actress; 2005 Molly's Way; Bogotá Film Festival Award for Best Actress; 2005 Molly's Way

Mairead McKinley is a Northern Irish actress.

== Career ==
Before starting her professional career, McKinley trained at the Royal Academy of Dramatic Art (RADA), where she won the Pauline Siddle Award.

=== Theatre ===
McKinley's work in theatre includes: Translations, Cyrano de Bergerac, Fair Ladies at a Game of Poem Cards and The Hour We Knew Nothing of Each Other at the National Theatre, London; Roberto Zucco, Shadows of the Glen, Riders to the Sea and Purgatory for the RSC; Ten Rounds and Further than the Furthest Thing (including tour) at the Tricycle Theatre, London; Macbeth and Don Juan at West Yorkshire Playhouse, Leeds; The Cherry Orchard for Oxford Stage Company; The Decameron at The Gate, London; The Terrible Voice of Satan at the Royal Court Theatre, London; The Playboy of the Western World for the Royal Exchange, Manchester; The Wind in the Willows and The Servant of Two Masters at the Crucible Theatre, Sheffield; The Party's Over at the Royal Theatre, Northampton; Dancing at Lughnasa at The Lyric, Belfast; The Playboy of the Western World at the Ambassador Theatre, Dublin; Orestes and The Clearing (winning her the TMA Award for Best Actress in a Supporting Role) for Shared Experience.

=== Television ===
Television appearances include: Doctors, Heartbeat, Casualty, The Amazing Mrs Pritchard, Murder Prevention, Peak Practice, Father Ted, The Bill, Resort to Murder and Life After Birth & Unforgotten.

=== Film ===
In film, she appeared in Molly's Way (for which she won the Best Actress awards at: Cinéma Tout Ecran, Geneva; Ourense Film Festival, Spain; Valdivia International Film Festival, Chile; and the Bogotá Film Festival, Colombia), Sundays, Why Not and Velvet Goldmine.

In 2014, she appeared as a barmaid in the film Edge of Tomorrow, starring Tom Cruise and Emily Blunt.

=== Radio ===
Her radio work includes: The Archers, Japanese Gothic Tales, Feelings Under Siege and Evelina.
