= Paul Chesterton =

English actor

- Education: Guildford School of Acting
- Occupation: Actor

Paul Chesterton is an English actor based in Surrey.

== Personal life ==
Chesterton was born in Harrow Wealdstone and grew up in South Africa (for nine years) and America (for four years).

== Career ==
Before starting his professional career, Chesterton trained at the Guildford School of Acting (GSA). He holds a BSC(Hons) in Economics from City University London.

=== Theatre ===
Chesterton's work in theatre includes: Present Laughter, The Alchemist and The Hour We Knew Nothing of Each Other at the National Theatre, London; Dracula at Birmingham Rep and The Valkyrie for ENO.

=== Film ===
In film, he appeared in Blenheim Palace – The Untold Story, One Night Fall and The Three Nails.
