= Amy Hall =

- Occupation: Actress

Amy Hall is an English actress.

== Career ==
Hall took a BA in English Literature at the University of Wales, Swansea, before training and studying for an MA in Performance at the Drama Centre, London, where she appeared in productions of Macbeth and The Seagull, graduating in 2006.

Hall has performed on both stage and screen; her performance as the character Daphne for the 2007 run of Noël Coward's Present Laughter at the National Theatre, London received mixed reviews. The Guardian noted that the character was a reminder of "the lurking misogyny in Coward's writing", while Reuters considered her "a bit too gushy" and The Spectator called her "a simpering Marilyn clone of the 1950s". Reception for her role in Gary Owen's play We That Are Left was more favorable, as Hall received praise from The Guardian, the Evening Standard and the British Theatre Guide.

== Select filmography and stage appearances ==
=== Theatre ===
Year	Title	Author	Theatre	Role	Notes
2007	Present Laughter	Noël Coward	National Theatre, London	Daphne	
2007	We That Are Left	Gary Owen	Watford Palace Theatre	Ginger	
2008	The Hour We Knew Nothing of Each Other	Peter Handke	National Theatre, London	Multiple	
2008	Blithe Spirit	Noël Coward	Oldham Coliseum Theatre	Elvira	
2009	The Shape of Things	Neil LaBute	Neath Little Theatre, Neath, Wales	Jenny	
2013	The Turn of the Screw	Henry James	Neath Little Theatre	Miss Grey	
2023	The Doctor's Dilemma	George Bernard Shaw	Lyttelton Theatre, London	Minnie	

=== Film and television ===
She has appeared in the film Lift and the short films Pride and What?, Illegal and Kate 1, 2, 3.

She has appeared in Wire in the Blood, and EastEnders on television.
