= Aditya Rawal =

Indian actor

- Born: 28 September 1993 (age 32); Bombay (now Mumbai), Maharashtra, India
- Education: University of Mumbai
- Occupations: Actor; writer
- Years active: 2012–present
- Parents: Paresh Rawal (father); Swaroop Sampat (mother)

Aditya Rawal (born 28 September 1993) is an Indian actor and writer who works in Hindi films. Born to actors Paresh Rawal and Swaroop Sampat, he started his career as a writer. Rawal made his film debut with Bamfaad (2020) and has since starred in Faraaz (2022), which earned him the Filmfare Award for Best Male Debut.

== Early life and education ==
Rawal was born in Bombay (now Mumbai) to actors Paresh Rawal and Swaroop Sampat. While his father is a recipient of a National Film Award, his mother is the winner of Miss India 1979. Rawal has a brother named Anirudh.

Rawal completed his graduation from Mumbai University, where he was the captain of the football team and has also went to the national camp. He pursued dramatic writing programme at the Tisch School of the Arts, New York. Rawal did an initiation course in theatre and performance at the London International School of Performing Arts.

== Career ==
Rawal started his career as a child artist in Ferrari Ki Sawaari. He then assisted on his father's film OMG – Oh My God!, both in 2012. Rawal then worked as a writer and wrote for Ashutosh Gowariker's Panipat in 2019 and for his father's film Dear Father in 2022. He also wrote and acted in the 2017 short film "The Mailbox".

Rawal made his acting debut with the 2020 film Bamfaad. He portrayed a Muslim teenager opposite Shalini Pandey. Shubhra Gupta noted, "Aditya Rawal delivers a restrained, convincing performance." While, Anna MM Vetticad stated, "In Bamfaad Rawal reveals himself to be a natural actor with solid potential. His physique is also a pleasant change from the steady stream of star sons."

Rawal next made his web debut with Teerandaz in 2022, portraying a tribal archer. Saibal Chatterjee wrote, "Aditya Rawal is called upon to carry the weight of the story on his shoulders. He does his best, but the screenplay does not give an opportunity to breathe some life into the character and the plot." Rawal portrayed a college student turned terrorist in the 2022 film Faraaz alongside Zahan Kapoor. Monika Rawal Kukreja of Hindustan Times noted, "Aditya Rawal's brutal portrayal as the brainwashed youth leaves you in awe. He delivers an impressive act. His character is far more layered than anyone else in the film."

In 2023, Rawal portrayed Chota Babban, a character based on Chhota Rajan in the web series, Bambai Meri Jaan. Zinia Bandyopadhyay of India Today termed him a "Surprise package", and added that his character may grow in the sequel

== Filmography ==
Key
†	Denotes films that have not yet been released

=== Films ===
Year	Title	Role	Notes	Ref.
2012	Ferrari Ki Sawaari	Young Dilip Dharmadhikari	Child artist	
2012	OMG – Oh My God!	—N/a	Assistant director	
2017	The Mailbox	Jay	Short film	
2020	Bamfaad	Nasir Jamal	ZEE5 film	
2023	Faraaz	Nibras		
2026	Subedaar	Prince		
TBA	Sundar Poonam †	Sundar	Filming	

=== Series ===
Year	Title	Role	Ref.
2022	Teerandaz	Sarju	
2023	Bambai Meri Jaan	Chota Babban	
2026	Daldal	Sajid	
TBA	Black and White †	TBA	

=== As writer ===
Year	Title	Notes	Ref.
2017	The Mailbox	Short film	
2019	Panipat	Story and screenplay	
2022	Dear Father	Gujarati film	
2023	Siachen	Theatre play	
2024	Jo Tera Hai Woh Mera Hai		

== Awards and nominations ==
Year	Award	Category	Work	Result	Ref.
2024	Filmfare Awards	Best Supporting Actor	Faraaz	Nominated	
2024	Filmfare Awards	Best Male Debut	Faraaz	Won	
