= Callum Dixon (actor) =

English actor

- Born: c. 1983 (age 41–42); Chichester, England
- Occupation: Actor

Callum Dixon (born c. 1983) is an English actor from Chichester.

== Career ==
Dixon's acting career was described as happening "by accident", as despite not enjoying school, he enjoyed drama lessons with his teacher who showed enthusiasm. At the age of 11, he auditioned for and secured a small part in a variant of Alan Bennett's play Forty Years On, during which time he decided that acting was what he wanted to pursue. While still at school, he continued to secure smaller roles, including a national tour of Oliver, where he would work on alternate two-weeks, on and off school. Prior to turning 18, Dixon was able to secure roles of characters several years younger than he was at the time, which he attributed to looking younger than his age. In 1990, he became the Royal Shakespeare Company's youngest member when he took the role in Edward II, as the son of the King.

== Acting credits ==
=== Theatre ===
Dixon's work in theatre includes: Market Boy, Sing Yer Heart Out for the Lads, Rosencrantz & Guildenstern Are Dead, The Wind in the Willows, The Day I Stood Still, Somewhere, The Recruiting Officer and The Hour We Knew Nothing Of Each Other at the National Theatre, London; The Bright and Bold Design, Richard II, Edward II and Two Shakespearean Actors for the RSC; Mr Kolpert, A Real Classy Affair, Faith and Mojo at the Royal Court, London; Waiting At The Water's Edge at the Bush, London; All I Want is an Ugly Sister at the Lilian Baylis Theatre, London; When We Are Rich at the Nuffield Theatre, Southampton; Deadwood at the Watermill Theatre, Newbury; The Accrington Pals and Mowgli's Jungle at the Octagon Theatre, Bolton; Drummers for Out of Joint and Telstar in the West End, London. and, most recently, The Government Inspector at The Young Vic with Julian Barratt.

=== Television ===
His television credits include: The Armando Iannucci Shows, Ashes to Ashes, Hustle, Casualty, EastEnders, Hetty Wainthropp Investigates, The Bill, The Knock, The Queen's Nose, Father Brown and Doctor Who.

=== Film ===
In film, he has appeared in Nick Moran's and James Hicks' Telstar (as actor-singer John Leyton), Babyjuice Express and Waterland.

=== Radio ===
Dixon's radio appearances include: Magpie Stories, Trampoline and The Wolfgang Chase.

== Personal ==
Dixon has two brothers, although is the only actor in his family. In his spare time during the early 1990s, he enjoyed snooker and was known to admire the work of Richard Ridings.
