= Gorilla (film) =

2019 film directed by Don Sandy

- Theatrical release poster
- Directed by: Don Sandy
- Written by: Don Sandy
- Produced by: Vijay Raghavendra
- Starring: Jiiva; Shalini Pandey
- Cinematography: R. B. Gurudev
- Edited by: Ruben
- Music by: Sam C. S.
- Production company: All In Pictures
- Distributed by: Seven Screen Studio
- Release date: 12 July 2019
- Running time: 126 minutes
- Country: India
- Language: Tamil

Gorilla is a 2019 Indian Tamil-language heist comedy film written and directed by Don Sandy. The film stars Jiiva and Shalini Pandey, while Yogi Babu, Radha Ravi, Sathish, Rajendran, Vivek Prasanna and Madhankumar appear in pivotal roles. It also prominently features a chimpanzee named Kong. The film revolves around three unemployed roommates deciding to rob a bank with their chimpanzee, to settle their neighbour farmer's debts.

Filming took place between February and June 2018. The music was composed by Sam C. S. with lyrics penned by Yugabharathi, while cinematography was handled by R. B. Gurudev and editing by Ruben. The film was released on 12 July 2019.

== Plot ==
Jeeva is a con artist who falls in love with Jhansi, who is being pressured to get married. Sathish, who is his family's sole breadwinner, is fired from his place of employment, and Venkat is an aspiring actor who hopes he can become a hero if he has money. The three are roommates living in Chennai with a chimpanzee named Kong. Sadiq, a debt-ridden farmer who is on the verge of committing suicide, becomes their neighbour. He persuades them to rob a bank to settle all their problems and they follow through, with Kong as an accomplice.

== Cast ==
- Jiiva as Jeeva
- Shalini Pandey as Jhansi
- Kong as the chimpanzee
- Radha Ravi as Assistant Commissioner Shanmugam
- Sathish as Sathish
- Yogi Babu as Pickpocket
- Rajendran as Barber
- Vivek Prasanna as Venkat
- Madhankumar as Sadiq
- Santhana Bharathi as Minister Ramaiah
- Radhakrishnan Gopal as Bomb maker
- Swaminathan as Bank customer
- Venkat Subha as Chief Minister
- Cinemawala Sathish as Police Inspector
- Vishnu as Ramaiah's son
- Ashritha Sreedas as Jhansi's friend
- Rahul Thatha as Bank security guard
- KPY Sarath as Barber's son
- Boys Rajan as Commissioner

== Production ==
Production commenced in February 2018. It was claimed to be the first Indian film to have a chimpanzee in a prominent role. The chimpanzee named Kong was hired from the Samut training station of Thailand, renowned for training animals for acting mainly in American films. The production team also initially cast RJ Balaji for the film but he was later replaced by Sathish. Most of the sequences related to the chimpanzee were shot in Thailand and the remaining portions were shot in Chennai. Though the film prominently features a chimpanzee despite its title, Jiiva said the title is a reference to guerrilla warfare. Filming had wrapped by June 2018.

== Soundtrack ==
The music was composed by Sam C. S. Sony Music India hold the music rights.

Track listing
No.	Title	Lyrics	Singer(s)	Length
1.	"Yaaradiyo"	Sam C. S.	Sid Sriram
2.	"So Mitta"	Logan	Gana Guna, Mukesh Mohamed
3.	"Gorilla Theme"	Yugabharathi, Aishwarya	Aishwarya, Anthony Daasan
4.	"Chimp Song"	Sam C. S.	Anthony Daasan, Poovaiyar

== Release ==
Gorilla was initially scheduled to release on 21 June 2019, then 5 July, but finally released on 12 July.

== Critical reception ==
On the review aggregator website Rotten Tomatoes, 20% of 5 critics' reviews are positive, with an average rating of 4.3/10.

Vishal Menon of Film Companion wrote, "There's something seriously amiss with a film when you look back at M. Rajesh's comedies and think that those were the good old days". Janani K of India Today wrote, "Gorilla is a lazily made film that takes the audience for granted. Do not expect any logic or quality comedy from Jiiva in his latest release". M Suganth of The Times of India wrote, "It would be easy to dismiss Gorilla as a silly, far-fetched film, but the fact is that the film works. The chief reason for this is that the director, Don Sandy, understands the silliness and gets the the [sic] cast and crew to tag along for this fun ride". Anjana Shekhar of The News Minute wrote that Gorilla was a "confused film that feels like a half-hearted effort right from the start" and felt many actors were wasted.
