= Samara Tijori =

Indian actor

- Born: 17 October 1995 (age 30); Bombay (now Mumbai), Maharashtra, India
- Education: Sophia College for Women
- Occupation: Actor
- Years active: 2021–present
- Parents: Deepak Tijori (father); Shivani Tijori (mother)

Samara Tijori (born October 17, 1995) is an Indian actress. She works in Hindi films and web series. She is the daughter of actor Deepak Tijori and fashion designer Shivani Tijori. She acted in the film Bob Biswas (2021) and the series Masoom (2022) and Daldal (2026).

== Early life and education ==
Samara Tijori was born on October 17, 1995, in Mumbai, alternate source mentions her birthday to be 12 August 1998. She has a Bachelor of Arts degree in psychology from Sophia College, Mumbai. She went to school at Jamnabai Narsee School and Mayo College Girls School in Ajmer. At Mayo College, she played football at the national level. She trained in dance and acting, learning Kathak, Jazz, and Contemporary styles. Karan Tijori is her younger brother.

== Career ==
Before acting, Tijori worked as an assistant on the films Dishoom and Bhoot: Part One – The Haunted Ship. She had her first role in Bob Biswas (2021), playing the main character's daughter. She also acted in the web series Masoom with Boman Irani and the Amazon Prime Video thriller Daldal (2026) with Bhumi Pednekar.

== Filmography ==
Key
| † | Denotes films that have not yet been released |

=== Films ===
| Year | Title | Role | Notes | Ref. |
|---|---|---|---|---|
| 2021 | Bob Biswas | Mini Biswas | ZEE5 film | |

=== Television ===
| Year | Title | Role | platform | Ref. |
|---|---|---|---|---|
| 2022 | Masoom | Sana | Disney+ Hotstar | |
| 2026 | Daldal | Anita Acharya | Prime Video | |
