= Carolina Main =

British actress

- Born: 1987 or 1988 (age 37–38); London, England
- Occupation: Actress
- Years active: 2010–present

Carolina Main (born 1987/8) is an English actress known for her TV roles as DC (later DS) Fran Lingley on the ITV crime drama series Unforgotten (2017–present), and as Cat Hogan on the Channel 5 and Virgin Media drama series Blood (2018–2020).

== Filmography ==
=== Film ===
Year	Title	Role	Notes
2010	Down	Julie	Short films
2011	They Walk Among Us	Charlotte	Short films
2011	Temporal	Fran	Short films
2012	Swimmer	Girl on Bridge	Short films
2016	Fan	Cathy	Indian film
2017	Taketh	Sarah Manning	Short films
2020	Estate	Schofield	Short films
2022	The Test	Angela	Short films
2023	Ocras	Mother	Short films

=== Television ===
Year	Title	Role	Notes
2013	Old Jack's Boat	Sailor Sue	Series 2; episode: "The Christmas Quest"
2014	Grantchester	Lilian Calthorpe	Series 1; episode 2
2014	Borgia	Cleofe Merescotti	Series 3; episode 8: "1502"
2015	Doctors	Pet Delucy	Series 17; episode 125: "Who Knew?"
2017–present	Unforgotten	DC/DS Fran Lingley	Series 2–6; 30 episodes
2018–2020	Blood	Cat Hogan	Series 1; episodes 1–6, and series 2; episode 4
2019	Temple	Celine	Series 1; episodes 4–6
2019	Midsomer Murders	Heather Wilder	Series 21; episode 1: "The Point of Balance"
2020	The Alienist	Cecilia Beaux	Series 2; episode 3: "Angel of Darkness: Labyrinth"
2021	Foundation	Ambassador Shae Un Shae	Series 1; episodes 1 & 2: "The Emperor's Peace" and "Preparing to Live"
2023	Dalgliesh	Angela Foley	Series 2; episodes 1 & 2: "Death of an Expert Witness: Parts 1 & 2"
2024	Criminal Record	DI Diana Markham	Series 1; episodes 1, 2 & 4: "Emergency Caller", "Two Calls" and "Protected"
