= Rahu Ketu (2026 film) =

2026 Indian film by Vipul Vig

- Theatrical release poster
- Directed by: Vipul Vig
- Written by: Vipul Vig
- Produced by: Manos kumar mohalder l; Suraj Singh; Varsha Kukreja; Pragati Deshmukh; Pankaj Sharma; Saksham Kesarwani, Assistant Professor (CUPB)
- Starring: Pulkit Samrat; Varun Sharma; Shalini Pandey; Chunky Panday
- Cinematography: Manoj Soni
- Edited by: Manann A. Sagar
- Music by: Vikram Montrose; Abhijit Vaghani; Tarsh Srivastava; Abhinav Shekhar; Mattoo Bros; Dilip Suthar; Kapil Dhakde
- Production companies: Zee Studios; BLive Productions
- Distributed by: Zee Studios
- Release date: 16 January 2026
- Running time: 139 minutes
- Country: India
- Language: Hindi
- Budget: est. ₹20–25 crore
- Box office: est. ₹8.52 crore

Rahu Ketu is a 2026 Indian Hindi-language comedy film written and directed by Vipul Vig. The film is produced by Umesh Kumar Bansal, Pragati Deshmukh, Suraj Singh and Varsha Kukreja under the Zee Studios and BLive Productions. It stars Pulkit Samrat, Varun Sharma, Shalini Pandey and Chunky Panday.

== Plot ==
Rahu and Ketu, two clueless yet lovable characters born from writer Churu Lal's magical notebook, set off on a chaotic mission to retrieve it from the crafty Meenu Taxi. Along the way, they uncover surprising truths about their origins, stumble into a dangerous drug mafia network, and ultimately take control of their own destiny.

== Cast ==
- Varun Sharma as Rahu
- Pulkit Samrat as Ketu
- Shalini Pandey as Meenu Taxi
- Piyush Mishra as Foofaji
- Chunky Panday as Mordechai
- Amit Sial as Deepak Sharma
- Manu Rishi Chadda as Churu Lal Sharma
- Sumit Gulati as Bansi
- Deepak K. Mangla
- Varun Narang as Anti Corruption officer

== Production ==
Zee Studios announced the commencement of the film's production on 1 April 2025. The film's shooting was wrapped on 18 July 2025.

== Marketing ==
The film's teaser was released on 20 November 2025. The song "Kismat Ki Chaabi" featuring Raja Kumari and Abhinav Shekhar, from the soundtrack, was launched on December 22, 2025, in the presence of the Honourable Chief Minister of Madhya Pradesh, Shri Mohan Yadav, aligning with the state's Nasha Mukti Abhiyan.

== Release ==
=== Theatrical ===
Rahu Ketu was theatrically released on 16 January 2026.

=== Home media ===
The film began its digital streaming on Amazon Prime Video from 7 March 2026.

== Reception ==
Rahul Desai of The Hollywood Reporter India describe it as "A witless assault on the senses." Rishabh Suri of Hindustan Times gave 2 stars out of 5 and said that "The film throws everything it can at the wall in the hope of generating humour, but very little of it actually lands." Ronak Kotecha of The Times of India rated it 3/5 stars and writes that "Rahu Ketu is refreshingly different. It has chaotic, busy, and occasionally uneven energy, but delivers plenty of genuine laughs and attempts something unusual within the comedy space."

Vineeta Kumar of India Today rated it 2/5 stars and said that " The Pulkit Samrat and Varun Sharma starrer struggles to justify its ambitious mythological premise, collapsing under weak writing, confused mythology and a narrative that goes nowhere." Mayur Sanap of Rediff.com gave 1 star and observed that "Rahu Ketu crams in a clumsy social commentary on corruption and social evils, along with flashy dance numbers, trying to do everything and too much all at once, before ending up as khichd."

Deepa Gahlot writing for Scroll.in noted that "It’s as high concept as a modest Bollywood movie can get – a magical notebook, which makes what is written in it happen." Rachit Gupta of Filmfare gave 2.5 stars out of 5 and said that "Pulkit Samrat and Varun Sharma's honest efforts are wasted in the dull comedy." Zinia Bandyopadhyay writing for Firstpost felt that "The Pulkit Samrat and Varun Sharma-starrer offers moments of humour and mythological insight, but inconsistent storytelling holds it back."
