= Sri Venkateswara University =

Public university in Andhra Pradesh, India

- Seal of Sri Venkateswara University
- Motto: (Sanskrit: ज्ञानं सम्यगवेक्षणम्); Jñānaṃ Samyagavekṣaṇam
- Motto in English: "Wisdom lies in proper perspective"
- Type: Public
- Established: 1954; 72 years ago
- Accreditation: UGC
- Budget: ₹185.2 million (US$1.9 million) (12th plan)
- Chancellor: Governor of Andhra Pradesh
- Vice-Chancellor: Tata Narasinga Rao
- Location: Tirupati, Andhra Pradesh, India
- Campus: 400 ha (1,000 acres); Urban
- Nickname: SVU
- Website: www.svuniversity.edu.in

Sri Venkateswara University (commonly referred as S. V. University or SVU) is a public state university located in Tirupati in Andhra Pradesh, India. The university is named after Venkateswara, whose shrine is located in the city.

The university was founded in 1954 by the then Chief minister of Andhra Pradesh, Tanguturi Prakasam Pantulu and Siram Govindarajulu Naidu as its founder vice-chancellor. The university campus covers a large area on land leased by Tirumala Tirupati Devasthanams. It is located on the West side of Tirupati, surrounded by the other universities in the city, namely Sri Padmavati Mahila Visvavidyalayam, Sri Venkateswara Veterinary University, Sri Venkateswara Vedic University, Sri Venkateswara Institute of Medical Sciences and National Sanskrit University.

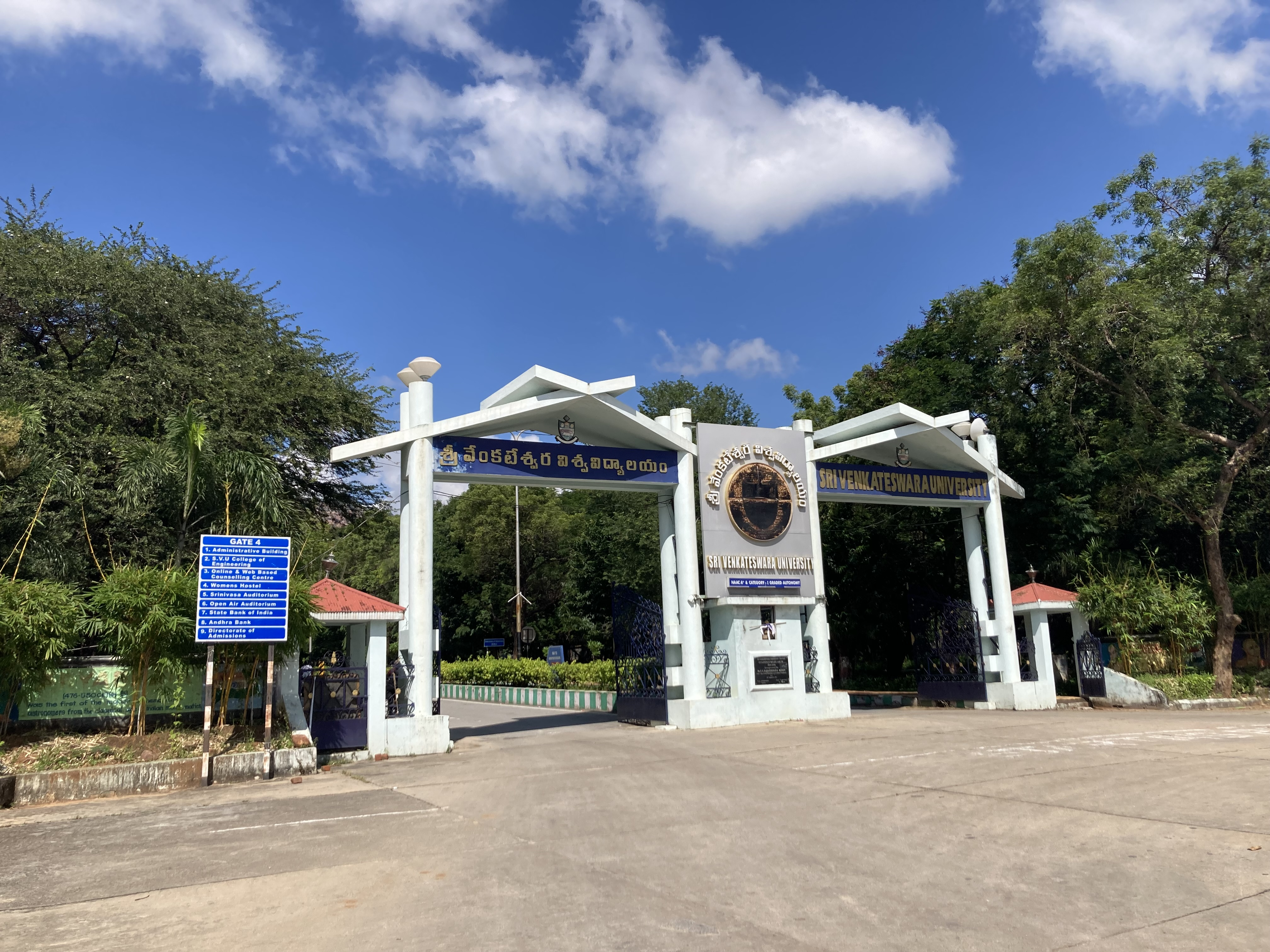
SVU Main Entrance

== Affiliated colleges ==
Colleges that are affiliated belong to Tirupati district, Chittoor district, and some parts of Annamayya district.

== College of Sciences ==
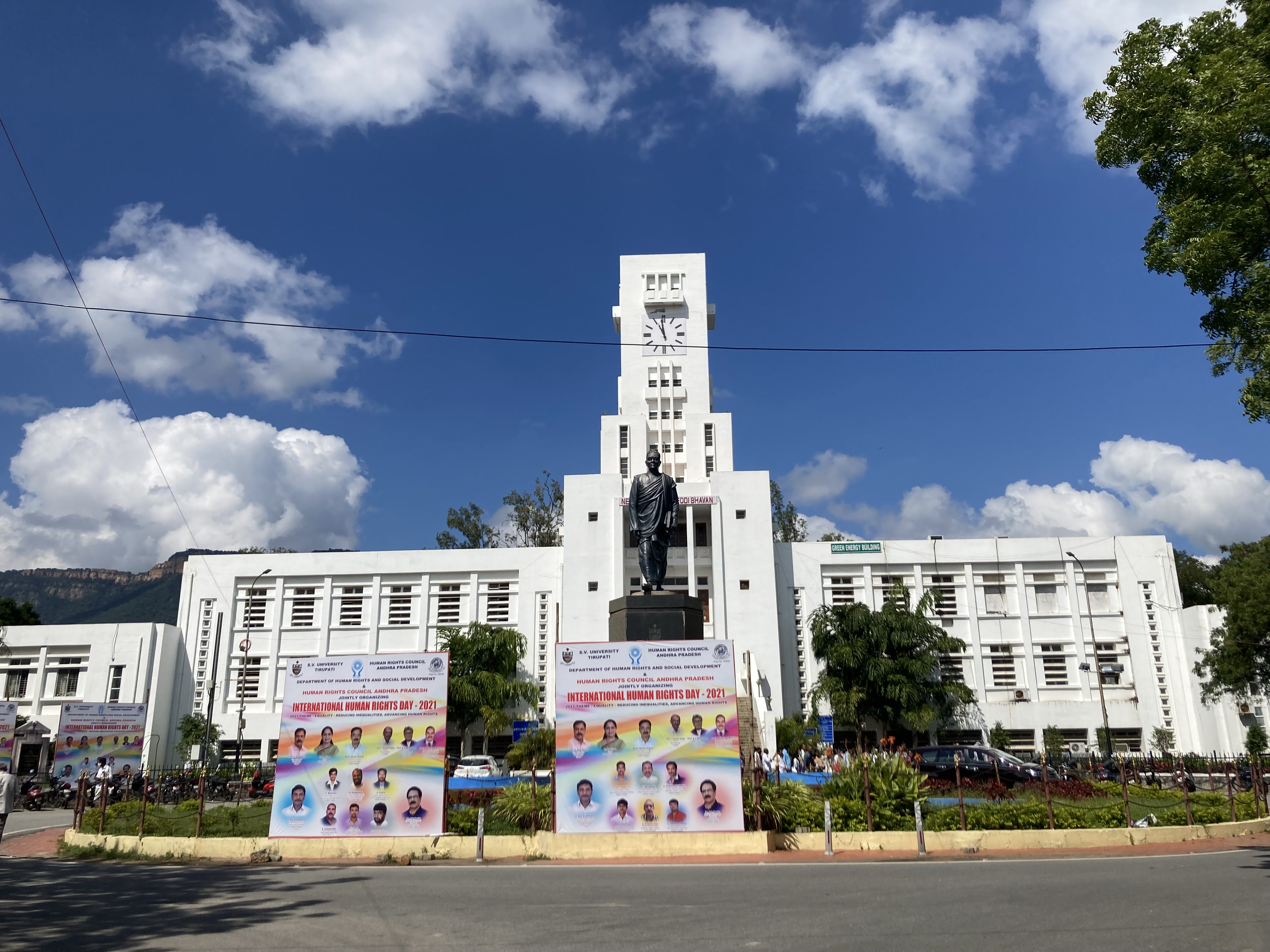
SVU Admin Building

=== College of Engineering ===
Sri Venkateswara University College of Engineering is an autonomous institution whose foundation was laid by the late Pandit Jawaharlal Nehru, the first prime minister of India, on 13 October 1959.

=== Department of Physics ===
The Department of Physics hosts one of the four national research facilities: a center for research using the MST Radar Facility at Gadanki, commissioned under the UGC.

== Rankings ==
University rankings

General – international
- QS (Asia) (2023): 351-400
- Times (World) (2023): 1201-1500
- Times (Asia) (2022): 351-400

General – India
- NIRF (Overall) (2022): 101-150
- NIRF (Universities) (2022): 67

Engineering – India
- NIRF (2024): 201-300

Sri Venkateswara University was ranked 1201–1500 in the world by the Times Higher Education World University Rankings of 2023, and 351–400 in Asia. The QS World University Rankings of 2023 ranked it 351-400 in Asia. The university was ranked 101-150 overall in India by the National Institutional Ranking Framework (NIRF) in 2023, 60th among universities and 251-300 in the engineering ranking. The NIRF ranked the university between 201-300 in the engineering rankings in 2024.

== Vice Chancellors ==
- S. Govindarajulu, 1954–1964
- Y. C. Vaman Rao, 1964–1969
- Jagannatha Reddy, 1969–1975
- K. Sachidananda Murthy, 1975–1978
- M. Santappa, 1979–1980
- M. V. Rama Sarma, 1980–1984
- G. N. Reddy, 1984–1987
- S. V. J. Lakshman, 1988–1991
- P. Jayaram Reddy, 1991–1994
- R. Rama Murthi, 1994–1997
- Kolakaluri Inoch, 1998–2001
- P. Murali, 2001–2004
- S. Jayarama Reddy, 2004–2007
- C. Ratnam, 2008–2008
- N. Prabhakara Rao, 2008–2011
- W. Rajendra, 2012–2015
- A. Damodaram, 2015–2018
- V. V. N. Rajendra Prasad, 2019–2019
- K. Raja Reddy, 2020–2023
- V. Srikanth Reddy, 2023–2024
- Ch. Appa Rao, 2024–2025
- Tata Narasinga Rao, 2025–present

== Notable alumni ==
- N. Chandrababu Naidu, Chief Minister of Andhra Pradesh and president of Telugu Desam Party
- Kotla Vijaya Bhaskara Reddy, former Chief Minister of Andhra Pradesh and former Union Cabinet Minister
- Prem Reddy, cardiologist and a major owner of Prime Healthcare Services
- Raj & DK, filmmaking duo
- Ramachandra Naidu Galla, industrialist and founder of Amara Raja Group
- Ranganath, Telugu language actor
- Vakkantham Vamsi, dialogue writer, screenwriter, and director in Telugu cinema
- Muzaffar Ali, Indian Filmmaker
- T. N. Manoharan, former chairman of Canara Bank
