= Kolakaluri Enoch =

Indian writer and educationist (born 1939)

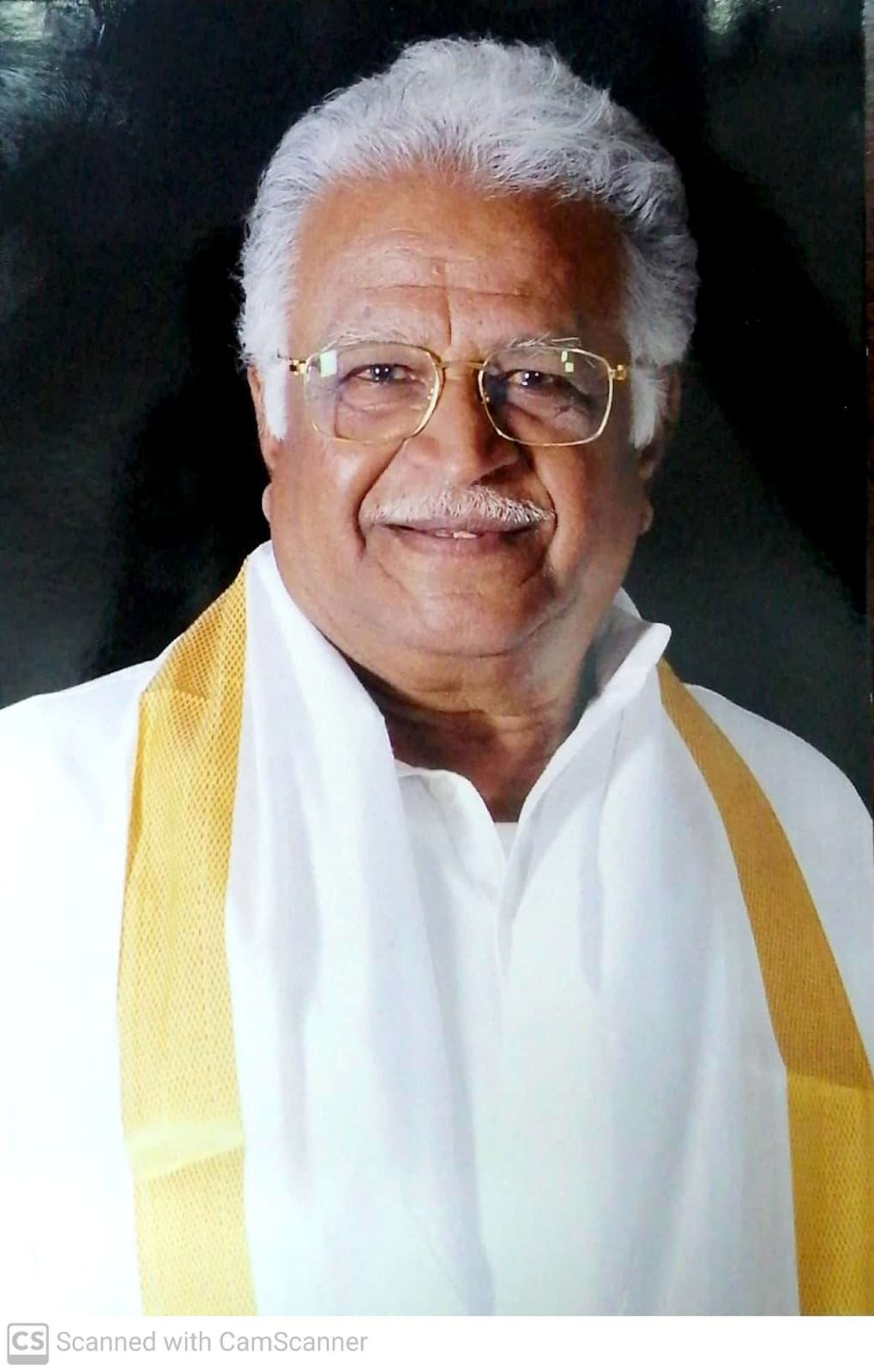
- Kolakaluri Enoch after Sahitya Akademi award
- Born: 1 July 1939 (age 87); Vejandla, Guntur, Madras Presidency, British India (now Andhra Pradesh, India)
- Occupations: Indian writer and educationist
- Parent(s): Ramaiah; Veeramma
- Awards: Padma Shri
- Website: http://kolakalurienoch.com/

Kolakaluri Enoch (born 1 July 1939) is an Indian writer, teacher, and former Vice Chancellor of Sri Venkateswara University, Tirupati. He was honoured by the Government of India, in 2014, by bestowing on him the Padma Shri, the fourth highest civilian award, for his contributions to the field of literature.

== Biography ==
My writings are my tears. says Professor Kolakaluri Enoch

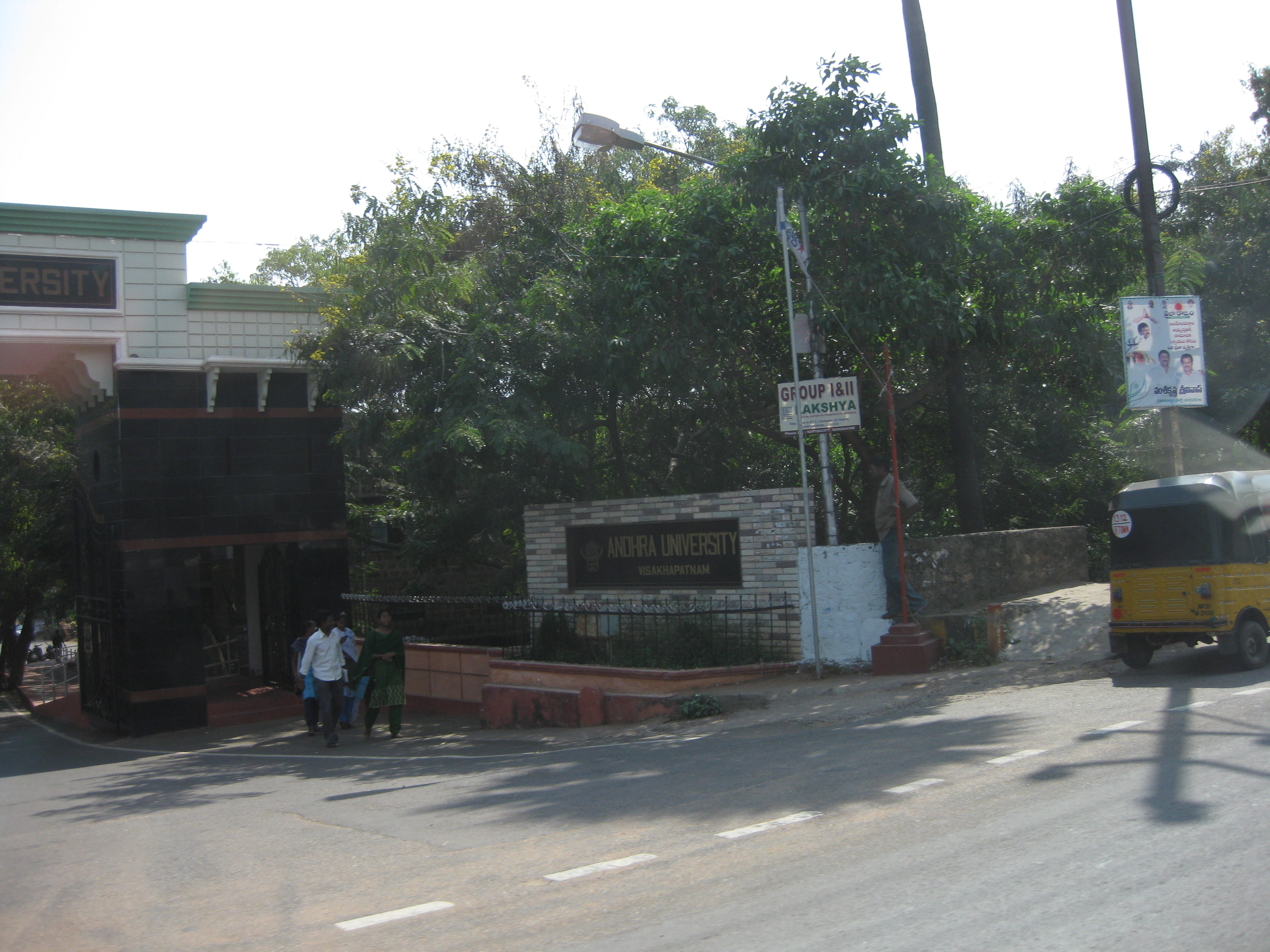
Entrance to the Andhra University - Kolakaluri Enoch's Alma Mater

Kolakaluri Enoch was born in a family with meagre financial resources, to Ramaiah and Veeramma, in the small village of Vejandla, in Guntur district, in the present day Andhra Pradesh state of India. His higher education was at the Andhra University from where he secured BA (Hons) in 1959. During his college days, he received the first prize for short story, poem, and play in the annual competitions for three years consecutively, from 1957 to 1959. Subsequently, he joined Sri Venkateswara University, in the temple town of Tirupati, and obtained a PhD.

Kolakaluri Enoch started his career by joining Andhra University as a faculty member. He had a notable career which took him to the post of the Vice Chancellor of the Sri Venkateswara University, Tirupati, the institution from where he secured his doctoral degree.

== Career and legacy ==
Kolakaluri Enoch has a fairly large body of work, which comprises 180 poems, 180 stories, 9 novels and 30 plays apart from other efforts on literary criticisms and Children's literature. Many of his works have been translated into other languages such as English, Hindi, Tamil, Kannada, and Malayalam. His works have been subjected to critical studies for educational purposes and nine PhDs and 5 MPhils have been reported to be based on them. One of his stories, Talalenodu (A Person without head), was a prescribed text book for intermediate course at Andhra University during the period from 1987 to 1995.

Enoch, belonging to a backward community, was also reported to be a social activist and, championed the cause of Dalits through his works. He was a member of the jury for T. V. Nandi awards of the Government of Andhra Pradesh in the year 1992.

== Awards and recognitions ==
Kolakaluri Enoch was awarded the Padma Shri, in 2014, by the Government of India He has also received many other awards such as:

- Awarded with the 29th Moortidevi Award by Bharatiya Jnanpith for his novel Ananta Jeevanam
- Telugu Bharati Puraskaram - C. P. Brown Academy, Alfa foundation, Hyderabad – 2010
- Andhra Pradesh Sahitya Akademi Award (for Adunika Sahitya Vimarsha Sutram) - 1998
- Andhra Pradesh Sahitya Akademi Award (for Munivahanudu) - 1988
- Andhra Pradesh Sahitya Akademi Award (for Urabavi (Short Story Arthology)) - 1986
- Mallemala Sahitya Puraskaram - Mallemala Trust, Kadapa – 2010
- Telugu Sakha Swarnotshava Puraskaram - S. V. University, Tirupati - 2009
- Duvvuri Ramanamma Puraskaram - DRW College, Gudur - 2009
- Viswavidyalaya Pratibha Puraskaram - Acharya Nagarjuna University, Guntur - 2007
- Life achievement Award - Siddhartha Kalapeetham, Vijayawada - 2006
- Telugu Bhashotsava Puraskaram - Government of Andhra Pradesh - 2004
- N. T. R. Lalitha Kala Puraskaram N. T. R. Foundation Trust, Hyderabad - 2008
- Sahiti Puraskaram - Potti Sreeramulu Telugu University - 1999
- Sahitya Academy Award Telugu for Vimarshini in 2018

He is also reported to have received the Ambedkar National Literary Award (1997), Juluri Nagarajarao Literary Award (1977), Paidi Lakshmaiah Literary Award (1998), and Madras Telugu Akademi Literary Award (2001) Some of the educational awards received by him are:

- Best Teacher Award - Government of Andhra Pradesh - 1993
- Best Educationalist Award - All India Ambedkar Association, Andhra Pradesh - 1994
- National Integration Award - Government of Andhra Pradesh - 1994
- Best Educational Award - Delhi Telugu Association, New Delhi - 1998

Some of the titles conferred on him by local cultural bodies are the Andhra Shri by the Sri Saraswati Journal in 1961, Kalasaraswati by Kalavedika, Hyderabad in 1985, Sahiti Samrat by Kalarayam, Hyderabad in 1991 and Kathaka Chakravarti by Joshua Samithi, Vinukonda in 1999. Here is detailed "Bio-Data of Prof.Kolakaluri Enoch".

== Literary contributions ==
Enoch is credited with over 180 poems, 180 stories, 9 novels and 30 plays. Some of his notable works are: Poems

- Asha Jyothi
- Shara Mamulee
- Kulam Dhanam
- Nannu Kalagananivvandi
- Kalala Karkhana
- Tridrava Pathakam
- Cheppulu
- Adi-Andhrudu
- Merupula Akasam
- Kannitigonthu
- Voice of Silence
- Nissabdaswaram

Dramas

- Key
- Jai Hind
- Manalanti Manishi
- Munivahanudu
- Sakshi
- Edugo Aesu Kristhu
- Needa
- Votlata
- The fifth Estate

One Act Plays

- Dristi (Collection of Playlets)
- Jyothi (Collection of Playlets)
- Abhyudayam (Collection of Playlets)
- Radio Natikalu (Collection of Playlets)
- T. V. Natikalu (Collection of Playlets)
- Amma (Collection of Playlets)
- K. E. Nataka Sahityam (Collection of Playlets)

Novels

- Samata
- Anatha
- Soundaryavati
- Sowbhagyavati
- Erulalo Virulu
- Ekkadundi Prasanthi?
- Rendu Kallu-Mudu Kallu
- Sarkaru Gaddi
- Anantajivanam
- Majimanishi
- Kalameghalu
- Stridarshanam (Collection of Novels)
- Dalitha Nivedanam (Collection of Novels)
- Samaja Sandarshanam (Collection of Novels)

Short Story Anthologies

- Gulabi Navvindi
- Bhavani
- Eda Jivitham?
- Uoorabavi
- Suryudu Taletthadu
- Kattadi
- Kolupulu
- Asprisyaganga
- Kaki
- Dalitha Kathanikalu
- Peddammagudi

Research Papers

- Telugu Vyasa Parinamam
- Telugu Basha Charitra
- Adhunika Sahitya Vimarsha Sutram
- Janapadula Sahitya Vimarsha
- Teluguloo Toli Navala
- Telugu Vyasam
- Telugu Vimarshanam
- Telugu Vachana Tattwam
- Mitra Samasame
- Punarukti Guname
- Telugu Sahityamloo Harijanulu
- Adhunikandhra Sahityamloo Muslimlu

Literary Criticism

- Telugu Vyasalu
- Sahityadarshini
- Sahitya Sandarshanam
- Samikshanam
- Samiksha Sahityam
- Pithika Sahityam
- Telugu Kathanika Parinamam
- Chinni Kayitala Vennela
- Telugu Navala Vikasam
- Sahitya Prayojanam
- Shudrakavi Shubhamurthi Vasucharitra Vaisisthyam

Translations

- New Testament - Kotha Odambadika
- Kshamabhiksha – Itara Kathalu - Alms of pardon & Other Stories
- Votlata - The Game of Votes
- Anantajivanam - The Cyclone Endless
- Kanniti Gonthu - Shurpanakha Still weeps

Children's literature

- Amma - Dance & Music Playlets

Enoch's writings have been translated into English, Kannada, Tamil, Malayalam, and Hindi. His works have been subjected to critical studies, both for literary and educational purposes.
