= The Family Man (Indian TV series) =

Indian spy thriller television series

- Genre: Espionage; Action thriller Black comedy
- Created by: Raj & DK
- Starring: Manoj Bajpayee; Priyamani; Sharib Hashmi; Ashlesha Thakur; Vedant Sinha; Neeraj Madhav; Sharad Kelkar; Dalip Tahil; Samantha; Shreya Dhanwanthary; Jaideep Ahlawat; Nimrat Kaur
- Music by: Sachin–Jigar
- Composer: Ketan Sodha
- Country of origin: India
- Original language: Hindi
- No. of seasons: 3
- No. of episodes: 26

Production
- Producers: Raj Nidimoru and Krishna D.K.
- Cinematography: Season 1: Azim Moolan; Nigam Bomzan; Season 2: Cameron Eric Bryson; Season 3: Jay Charola
- Editor: Sumeet Kotian
- Running time: 35–61 minutes
- Production company: d2r Films

Original release
- Network: Amazon Prime Video
- Release: 20 September 2019 – present

Related
- Farzi (2023–present)

The Family Man is an Indian Hindi-language spy thriller streaming television series created by Raj & DK for Amazon Prime Video. It features Manoj Bajpayee as Srikant Tiwari, a middle-class man secretly working as an intelligence officer for the Threat Analysis and Surveillance Cell (TASC), a fictitious branch of the National Investigation Agency. It also stars Priyamani, Sharad Kelkar, Neeraj Madhav, Sharib Hashmi, Dalip Tahil, Sunny Hinduja and Shreya Dhanwanthary. The series is produced and directed by Raj & D.K, who also co-wrote the story and screenplay with Suman Kumar and Tusshar Seyth, with dialogue penned by Sumit Arora and Manoj Kumar. Samantha Ruth Prabhu was hired for the second season of the series as the main antagonist, making her foray into the digital medium, with Suparn S. Verma directing a section of the season.

The series was announced in June 2018, with the filming of the first season starting simultaneously in Mumbai, Delhi, Kerala, Jammu and Kashmir, Ladakh; and it was wrapped up by May 2019. Filming for the second season began in November 2019, and was wrapped up in September 2020. The cinematography for the first season was handled by Azim Moolan and Nigam Bomzan, with Cameron Eric Bryson hired for the second season. Sumeet Kotla edited the series, while Ketan Sodha composed the background score.

The Family Man: Season 1 was showcased at the Television Critics Association's summer press tour held in Los Angeles in July 2019, and eventually premiered on Amazon Prime Video on 20 September 2019. It received acclaim from critics and audiences, who praised the performance of the cast members, writing and execution. It eventually became the most viewed streaming series on Amazon Prime Video. The second season was scheduled to be aired on 12 February 2021 but was delayed, and it was finally released on 4 June 2021. Amazon announced the third season began shooting in May 2024. On 27 June 2025, the production team released an announcement teaser for the third season. A promotional video released on 28 October 2025 confirmed that the third season was premiered on 21 November 2025. The trailer of the 3rd Season was released on 7 November 2025.

The Family Man has received eleven Filmfare OTT Awards, five Asian Academy Creative Awards and two awards at the Indian Film Festival of Melbourne.

== Synopsis ==
=== Season 1 ===
The Family Man follows the story of Srikant Tiwari, who works as a senior officer in the Threat Analysis and Surveillance Cell (TASC), along with his best friend & colleague JK Talpade, which is a part of the National Investigation Agency (NIA) of India. He is a married man with two kids. The first season follows an investigation of a potential terrorist attack, while simultaneously following his slightly unsettled family life. Srikant and JK, along with their subordinates Zoya, Milind and Jayesh, and Force One officer Imran Pasha work on stopping Mission Zulfiqar from succeeding. The show is inspired by real life newspaper articles.

=== Season 2 ===
The second season's story line focuses on a Tamil Tiger-esque military resistance from Sri Lanka and their plans for a freedom fight.

=== Season 3 ===
In the third season, the story follows rising tensions in North-East India and shows how COVID-19 is used to distract from China’s efforts to expand its presence along the China-India border. A group of international defense companies also works to increase military hardware sales in the region by creating planned chaos. Srikant Tiwari is framed as a scapegoat by Meera, who manages the destabilization operations as an intermediary for the group, and by Rukma, a contracted drug dealer turned mercenary. Major Sameer watches the developments unfold and enters the picture at the end of part one.

== Cast ==
=== Main ===
Character	Portrayed by	Season 1	Season 2	Season 3	Season 4
Srikant "Sri" Tiwari	Manoj Bajpayee	Main	Main	Main	
Jayavant "JK" Kashinath Talpade	Sharib Hashmi	Main	Main	Main	
Suchitra "Suchi" Tiwari	Priyamani	Main	Main	Main	
Dhriti "D" Tiwari	Ashlesha Thakur	Main	Main	Main	
Atharv Tiwari	Vedant Sinha	Main	Main	Main	
Sajid Ghani	Shahab Ali	Main	Main		
Moosa Rehman	Neeraj Madhav	Main			
Rajalakshmi "Raji" Sekharan	Samantha Ruth Prabhu		Main		
Rukmangadha "Rukma" Sinha	Jaideep Ahlawat			Main	
Meera Eston	Nimrat Kaur			Main	
Muthu Pandian	Ravindra Vijay		Main		
Arvind	Sharad Kelkar	Main	Main		
Milind Hinduja	Sunny Hinduja	Main	Main		
Zoya Ali	Shreya Dhanwanthary	Main	Cameo	Main	
Gautam Kulkarni	Dalip Tahil	Main	Main	Main	
Kalyan/Salman	Abhay Verma		Main		
M Umayal	Devadarshini		Main		
Chellam	Uday Mahesh		Main	Main	
PM Proneeta Basu	Seema Biswas		Main	Main	
Saloni Bhatt	Gul Panag	Main		Main	
Major Vikram	Sundeep Kishan	Main		Main	
Major Sameer	Darshan Kumar	Main	Main	Main	
Mary	Zarin Shihab	Main			
Bilal	Ashmith Kunder	Main			
Ansari	Sunil Gupta	Main	Cameo		
Asif	Dinesh Prabhakar	Main			
Sharma	Pawan Chopra	Main	Main	Main	
Kareem Bhatt	Abrar Qazi	Main			
Yashwant Kumar	Aditya Srivastava			Main	
Dwaraknath	Jugal Hansraj			Main	
Yatish Chawla	Harman Singha			Main	

=== Recurring ===
- Kishore Kumar as Major Imran Pasha, Force One leader
- Vijay Vikram Singh as Ajit
- Debasish Mondal as Jayesh
- Krishna D. K. as Nikhil
- Arpit Singh as Hussain
- Mir Sarwar as Faizan
- Aritro Rudraneil Banerjee as Punit Banerjee
- Kachoo Ahmad Khan as Altaf
- Sanyukta Timsina as Jonali
- Shahid Latief as Basharat Ali
- Jay Upadhyay as Dr. Patel
- Suresh Vishwakarma as Inspector Suresh Jadhav
- Sohaila Kapur as School Principal
- Ajay Jadhav as Shinde
- Geeta Nair as Ramya Sathe
- Mark Bennington as Bruce Lennington
- Shahid Gulfam as Mustafa
- GM Wani as Pakistan's PM Qazi
- Yatendra Bahuguna as Vaibhav Therani
- Mime Gopi as Bhaskaran Palanivel
- Azhagam Perumal as Deepan Anthony
- Anandsami as Selvarasan (Selva)
- Srikrishna Dayal as Subramaniam Palanivel (Subbu)
- Abhishek Shankar as Sri Lanka's PM Lasit Rupatunga
- Tareeq Ahmed Khan as Syed
- Kaustubh Kumar as Tanmay Ghosh, Srikant's corporate job boss
- Asif Basra as Counsellor
- Vipin Sharma as Sambit
- M. Ranjith as Karthik
- Rajesh Balachandiran as Prabhu
- Prakash Rajan as Nanda
- J. Perumal as Jebaraj
- Shruti Bisht as Mahima
- Sharik Khan as Rahul
- Patrali Chattopadhyay as Gunjan
- Tintin Raikhan as Unnamed Chinese spy who gets a go-ahead for Project Guan-Yu by his Chinese handler
- Sunil Thapa as David Khuzou
- Paalin Kabak as Stephen Khuzou
- Ravi Varma as Varaprasad Pakala
- Andrea Kevichüsa as Nima
- Riyan Mipi as Bobby
- Tenzing Dalha as Rabbit
- Millo Sunka as Jesmina
- Poonam Gurung as Ulupi
- Riken Ngomle as Subbu
- Akshat Singh as Vasant
- Bryan Lawrence as Martin Hall
- Adeel Ali as Lloyd
- Jason Tham as Colonel Zhulong
- Diwakar Dhyani as General Nawaz Hasan
- Rag Mayur as Maridesh Babu
- Vijay Sethupathi as Michael Vedanayagam (cameo appearance)

== Episodes ==
Series	Episodes	Originally released	
Series	Episodes	First released	Last released
1	10	20 September 2019	20 September 2019
2	9	4 June 2021	4 June 2021
3	7	21 November 2025	21 November 2025

=== Season 1 (2019) ===
No.	Title	Directed by	Written by	Original release date	Length (Minutes)
1	"The Family Man"	Raj Nidimoru and Krishna D.K.	Raj Nidimoru and Krishna D.K. Suman Kumar; Dialogues: Sumit Aroraa	20 September 2019	53 Minutes
The Indian Coast Guard intercepts a boat with three ISIS terrorists in the Arabian Sea near Kochi and takes them prisoner. A Force One unit, led by Imran Pasha, is tasked to handle the transportation of the prisoners under TASC supervision. Meanwhile, Dhriti, TASC officer Srikant Tiwari's daughter, is on the brink of suspension from school for her questionable activities. Two of the ISIS prisoners try to escape in Mumbai which results in a shootout with Force One commandos. Srikant convinces Moosa, one of the ISIS operatives, to surrender. Meanwhile in Pakistan, Major Sameer is planning a mission to force India into taking military action. One of the ISIS militants plants a scooter bomb and is considered by Sameer for Mission Zulfiqar.
2	"Sleepers"	Raj Nidimoru and Krishna D.K.	Raj Nidimoru and Krishna D.K. Suman Kumar; Dialogues: Sumit Aroraa	20 September 2019	47 Minutes
The bomb planted by an ISIS militant in a scooter near Black Horse (Kala Ghoda) statue explodes even after the security forces try to defuse it, resulting in the death of the bomb defuser, Chirayu and two more Bomb Disposal Squad officials. Pressure increases to find the bomber. Analysts of T.A.S.C receive information about three gaming engineers who are linked with ISIS. Srikant plans to arrest them. After arresting them at their company, on interrogation, they mention a dropbox and strongly suspect it is a student in Victoria College but they reveal they have never met him face to face.
3	"The Anti-National"	Raj Nidimoru and Krishna D.K.	Raj Nidimoru and Krishna D.K. Suman Kumar; Dialogues: Sumit Aroraa	20 September 2019	46 Minutes
Under the instructions of T.A.S.C., local police monitors the dropbox. Meanwhile, Kareem Bhat, an anti-national student is contacted by ISIS for a mission. In Pakistan, Major Sameer plans to misguide the intelligence of India to throw them off their trail. At Victoria College, Kareem picks up a message from the dropbox and hence ends up on T.A.S.C.'s radar. T.A.S.C sets up surveillance at Kareem's room and finds he is planning something with a floor plan and guest list. However, Kareem suspects he is being watched and gives T.A.S.C the slip. Kareem with two of his friends is shown preparing a van to get in a party of an Anti-Muslim MP. T.A.S.C scrambles to find his location as they suspect he is planning an attack and try to evacuate the Bhendi Bazaar market.
4	"Patriots"	Raj Nidimoru and Krishna D.K.	Raj Nidimoru and Krishna D.K. Suman Kumar; Dialogues: Sumit Aroraa	20 September 2019	42 Minutes
Srikant suspects his wife Suchitra is having an affair with Arvind, as they meet at a restaurant for her new job offer at Arvind's office. However, Srikant traces Suchitra's phone and confronts her at the hotel, where she denies it, saying they are just friendly colleagues. T.A.S.C is meanwhile able to hack Kareem's hard drive and they figure out the location of the strike. On the night of the planned attack, Kareem and his friends run into the roadblocks set up by T.A.S.C. One of his friends starts shooting and hence all three are shot dead in the return fire. T.A.S.C finds out their plan was to just feed beef to the guests in the party to teach them a lesson and not to bomb the place. Srikant reaches home drunk and accuses Suchitra of having an affair. Kareem and his friends are branded as terrorists to save T.A.S.C's face. In the last scene, it is shown the actual person responsible for the scooter bombing is in fact Sajid, also a student from Victoria College, who has just been released from jail after a rough interrogation.
5	"Pariah"	Raj Nidimoru and Krishna D.K.	Raj Nidimoru and Krishna D.K. Suman Kumar; Dialogues: Sumit Aroraa	20 September 2019	48 Minutes
Sajid meets an ISIS agent who tell him they have bigger plans for him and Kareem was sacrificed to protect his identity. Srikant is under investigation and during interrogation assumes all the blame on himself. On the other hand, Moosa seduces a nurse, Mary, to meet his ends. He is able to make a call using Mary's cellphone and informs ISIS militants he will escape from the hospital in 2-3 days. In the middle of having sex with Mary, he leaves his hospital room to see Asif. There Moosa kills him by injecting Potassium into his blood. Sajid's next task is to go to Srinagar for Mission Zulfiqar. Meanwhile, Srikant is temporarily transferred to Srinagar as a punishment. He and Suchitra are still not on speaking terms. When Srikant reaches Srinagar, Kulkarni then tells him there is a reason for his transfer as they received intel from RAW about a key terrorist sleeper agent coming to Srinagar.
6	"Dance of Death"	Raj Nidimoru and Krishna D.K.	Raj Nidimoru and Krishna D.K. Suman Kumar; Dialogues: Sumit Aroraa	20 September 2019	40 Minutes
In a flashback, it is shown Moosa is one of Faizan's top ISIS agents and orchestrated a terrorist attack in Istanbul where he killed 270 people with nerve gas. Major Sameer recruits him for Mission Zulfiqar. At present, Mary is scared when she learns about Asif's death but does not reveal the truth to T.A.S.C or the hospital staff. Asif's death is attributed to cardiac arrest and the security force is substantially reduced in the hospital while Pasha is suspended. The team at Srinagar is tracking Basharat who supervises every terrorist activity in Kashmir. Srikant discovers Moosa is in fact Al Qatil, a dangerous chemical engineer and one of the most-wanted terrorists. He asks JK and Pasha to rush to the hospital. At the hospital, Jayesh, Zoya, and Milind are guarding Moosa, when four armed men attack the hospital in order to free him. In the ensuing gunfight, Jayesh and Pasha are killed along with the four attackers. Meanwhile, Moosa is able to escape from the hospital but only after brutally murdering Mary with a surgical knife and leaving a trail of bodies behind him.
7	"Paradise"	Raj Nidimoru and Krishna D.K.	Raj Nidimoru and Krishna D.K. Suman Kumar; Dialogues: Sumit Aroraa	20 September 2019	39 Minutes
As the news of the attack at the City Hospital spreads, T.A.S.C. faces criticism and investigation once again. Suchitra goes to help Arvind when his daughter Rhea falls sick. In Srinagar, Sajid gets impatient and demands a call with Faizan. Meanwhile, Srikant and his team get intel about Basharat attending a wedding in Baramulla; however, the residents of Baramulla consider themselves Pakistanis and the army cannot enter the area without upsetting public sentiment. Basharat attends the wedding to meet Sajid and get him in touch with Faizan. Srikant, being anxious, enters the wedding in disguise and recognises Sajid as one of the suspects arrested by Mumbai Police. He continues to pursue Sajid ignoring the warning and orders from Saloni and Major Vikram. Srikant's impulsive actions cause the army to lose Basharat's trail and Sajid easily escapes from there with support from the locals.
8	"Act of War"	Raj Nidimoru and Krishna D.K.	Raj Nidimoru and Krishna D.K. Suman Kumar; Dialogues: Sumit Aroraa	20 September 2019	43 Minutes
Faizan is captured in Pakistan in an operation by US Forces after Srikant notifies the CIA about his location. Srikant enters Balochistan with the help of an undercover RAW agent. They extract information out of Faizan posing as agents from the ISI, appealing to his patriotism towards Pakistan. They learn the terrorists are planning to release nerve gas in New Delhi. The gas has been smuggled into Kashmir over time and is now being transported to Delhi. Sajid is supposed to transport the nerve gas and build the bomb together with Moosa. The PM of India is alerted about this plan. Suchitra goes to Lonavala with Arvind for a conference and impresses the VCs. She becomes worried about something that happened between her and Arvind later that night, which is not revealed. Dhriti, who is home alone, goes to a late-night party at her friend Sid's house and Atharv finds Srikant's revolver in the locked room. Being curious, he starts playing with it but hides it under the pillow when Dhriti comes home crying.
9	"Fighting Dirty"	Raj Nidimoru and Krishna D.K.	Raj Nidimoru and Krishna D.K. Suman Kumar; Dialogues: Sumit Aroraa	20 September 2019	38 Minutes
Some officials of T.A.S.C accidentally send an SMS to Jonali, Kareem's girlfried, from his phone. This makes Jonali curious and she goes on a search with Ramya, a social activist, for Kareem's body cam which is hidden in an abandoned car. Pakistan's PM makes a deal with General Ansari and he abandons Mission Zulfiqar. Major Sameer is arrested by 1/11 Infantry unit of the Pakistan army and provides the details of the nerve gas attack when he finds out about General Ansari's deal, but is able to warn Basharat, who catches up with Sajid to stop him, but Sajid refuses. Meanwhile the Indian army is able to kill Basharat and his men in a cross-fire and procure all the nerve gas canisters while Sajid escapes again. As the TASC team celebrates the failure of the terrorist attack, Sajid meets Moosa in New Delhi where Moosa informs him there is a plan B for Mission Zulfiqar and he is already blackmailing a chemical engineer Vaibhav to execute the mission.
10	"The Bomb"	Raj Nidimoru and Krishna D.K.	Raj Nidimoru and Krishna D.K. Suman Kumar; Dialogues: Sumit Aroraa	20 September 2019	48 Minutes
T.A.S.C realises Mission Zulfiqar is not over. Meanwhile Moosa's plan is to recreate the Bhopal Gas Tragedy in New Delhi whereas Sajid blackmails Vaibhav to gain entry into the Orion Chemicals factory. Moosa's men commandeer a water tank which Moosa uses as a reagent for the toxic reaction. Moosa and Sajid get into the chemical plant and Moosa kills Vaibhav. Moosa sets up the plant to spew toxic gases which will kill everyone in Delhi within 2 hours. Zoya and Milind enter the chemical plant and end up in a gunfight with Moosa's men disguised as security guards. Srikant meets Moosa's mother in Delhi and releases a video in the news where Moosa's mother appeals to him to surrender. Moosa changes his mind on seeing his mother and decides to stop the toxic gas from leaking but Sajid disagrees and a brutal fist-fight ensues between the two which ends with Moosa lying dead and Sajid walking away wounded. Srikant and JK again prematurely celebrate their victory when they find Moosa's dead body. Meanwhile, Zoya and Milind are pinned in the cross-fire and are unable to reach Srikant. In the last scene, it is shown the pressure has reached the critical limit and the toxic gases have started leaking while Zoya cries in desperation and Milind lies wounded badly. Suddenly, one of the containers bursts open after reaching the critical pressure, and the show ends on a cliffhanger.

=== Season 2 (2021) ===
No.	Title	Directed by	Written by	Original release date	Length (Minutes)
1	"Exile"	Raj Nidimoru and Krishna D.K.	Raj Nidimoru and Krishna D.K. Suman Kumar	4 June 2021	59 Minutes
Several years ago, Bhaskaran, Deepan, and Bhaskaran's brother Subbu escape an attack on their base from the Sri Lankan forces led by Lasit Rupatunga. They resolve to continue their fight for the Tamil Eelam while fleeing the country on a boat. In the present time, Srikant Tiwari has quit T.A.S.C. and now works as an IT employee. Rupatunga asks the Indian PM Basu to hand over Subbu to them. Suchitra has left her job and is seeking counselling. It is revealed T.A.S.C. averted the gas leak at Orion from turning into a major disaster. PM Basu asks Kulkarni to devise a plan to hand over Subbu to the Lankan government. JK is sent to Chennai to oversee a low-key operation to apprehend Subbu and bring him to Mumbai's T.A.S.C. office. However, Subbu overpowers T.A.S.C. officers, takes hostages, and refuses to negotiate. Srikant enlists the help of Chellam, a retired legendary agent who ran missions in Sri Lanka and a close friend of Bhaskaran, to end the crisis. Bhaskaran convinces Subbu to surrender and Subbu is taken into legal custody for killing T.A.S.C. officers. Kalyaan, a close friend of Srikant's daughter Dhriti, drops her home and is revealed to be an ally of Sajid, the terrorist from the Orion chemical fiasco, who is now in London.
2	"Weapon"	Raj Nidimoru and Krishna D.K.	Raj Nidimoru and Krishna D.K. Suman Kumar	4 June 2021	50 Minutes
Major Sameer, the man behind Mission Zulfiqar, meets his boss General Ansari in London, informs him of his new mission Zulfiqar 2.0, and assassinates him. In Chennai, a woman Raji faces harassment at work from her boss Nanda, and during the commute from an eve teaser. One night when the eve teaser stalks Raji into a deserted lane, she attacks him brutally, kills him, and is revealed to be a Tamil rebel operative. Srikant and Suchitra attend counselling. Sameer sends Sajid back to India to run the mission. T.A.S.C. officers take Subbu to court, where Sajid detonates a bomb in a scooter that kills Subbu. Bhaskaran quits the government in exile, paving the way for Deepan to be the prime minister. PM Basu wants bilateral talks with Rupatunga in Chennai. Bhaskaran holds PM Basu responsible for his brother's death and wants to make her pay for it. Sameer meets Bhaskaran and extends his support for the cause. Bhaskaran activates an elite unit led by Selvarasan. Raji decides to end her life after the news of Subbu's death and Bhaskaran quitting. Selvarasan calls Raji and asks her to quit her job and await instructions for a mission.
3	"Angel of Death"	Suparn S. Verma	Raj Nidimoru and Krishna D.K. Suman Kumar	4 June 2021	33 Minutes
A few years ago, Selvarasan's unit stole C4 explosives from the Sri Lankan Army and buried them at Point Pedro. Sambit informs PM Basu of the threat to her life; she remains adamant about changing neither the date, time or the venue of the bilateral talks. A shopkeeper refers to Kalyaan as Salman, but he brushes it aside when questioned by Dhriti. Srikant takes Suchitra to a restaurant to celebrate her birthday, and they get into a fight about their marriage. Srikant quits his IT job after an intense but hilarious confrontation with his boss and rejoins T.A.S.C. Nanda knows of Raji's secret and blackmails her into getting invited for dinner. Suchitra rejoins her job. Raji kills Nanda after he becomes violent with her during sex after dinner.
4	"Eagle"	Suparn S. Verma	Raj Nidimoru and Krishna D.K. Suman Kumar	4 June 2021	49 Minutes
In a flashback, it is shown Raji is the best fighter pilot amongst the rebels. Before leaving for Chennai, a guilt-ridden Srikant visits Karim's girlfriend Jonali and tells her Karim is not a terrorist. Sameer purchases a flying school named Tigris Aviation from a friend of Bhaskaran. Srikant joins the T.A.S.C. team in Chennai. Inspector Umayal starts investigating Nanda's disappearance. Chellam shares a list of the rebel safehouses with Srikant and his colleague J.K. Talpade. Umayal interrogates Raji at her house and asks her not to leave the city without her permission. Srikant and J.K. run into Raji while she absconds from her house. Umayal gets suspicious about Raji and heads back to find Srikant and J.K. with the remains of Nanda.
5	"Homecoming"	Suparn S. Verma	Raj Nidimoru and Krishna D.K. Suman Kumar	4 June 2021	43 Minutes
Srikant and J.K. are arrested mistakenly and spend the night in custody. Umayal joins the T.A.S.C. team. T.A.S.C. identifies Raji as a rebel operative. Raji, Selvarasan, and Sajid plan to meet at Vedaranyam, the rebels' former base, and leave for Sri Lanka to pick up supplies for the mission. Noticing activity on rebel channels, Sambit and Kulkarni warn Deepan to stop Bhaskaran. Raji and Sajid retrieve the C4 from Point Pedro.
6	"Martyrs"	Raj Nidimoru and Krishna D.K.	Raj Nidimoru and Krishna D.K. Suman Kumar	4 June 2021	40 Minutes
Raji and Sajid return to Vedaranyam with the C4. Chellam advises Srikant to find the unit and shares Jebraj's (code name: Local 52) address at Vedaranyam. The T.A.S.C. team nabs Raji when she goes to Jebraj's house to get the C4 detonator. Srikant and Umayal question Raji at the police station but fail to extract any information. Selvarasan mobilises the locals and ambushes the police station. They escape with a wounded Raji, and Milind dies in the ensuing shootout, much to the sorrow of the T.A.S.C. team. Annoyed by Srikant's attempts to foil his plans, Sajid gets permission from Sameer to stop him. Sajid instructs Salman to kidnap Dhriti.
7	"Collateral Damage"	Suparn S. Verma	Raj Nidimoru and Krishna D.K. Suman Kumar	4 June 2021	35 Minutes
The T.A.S.C. team finds the C4 detonator at Jebraj's house. Dhriti leaves the house after a fight with Suchitra. The assassination plan is to fly a plane laden with C4 into the convention center where the bilateral talks would occur. Sajid builds a new detonator and loads the plane with C4. Salman and Dhriti watch a film and head to his house. Sajid bids adieu to Raji and goes to Mumbai. Suchitra is worried as Dhriti hasn't returned home and informs Srikant. Ajit tracks Dhriti's phone to a local train. Srikant realises his daughter has been kidnapped and heads to Mumbai.
8	"Vendetta"	Suparn S. Verma	Raj Nidimoru and Krishna D.K. Suman Kumar	4 June 2021	42 Minutes
T.A.S.C. suspects a 9/11 style attack. J.K. and Muthu are stopped from checking the plane at Tigris Aviation. Sajid calls Srikant and warns him to stay out of his way. J.K. sneaks into the covered plane and discovers the C4. The rebels attack the duo and they take cover. They split and make a successful escape, but J.K. is shot and falls unconscious in a bush along the highway. The RPF shares a video of Salman at Dombivli station where he dumps Dhriti's phone while his accomplice Syed is spotted in the CCTV footage at a mall. The police start searching for Salman and Syed. Shinde gets a lead on Syed's location. Sajid, along with Salman and Syed, plans to kill Dhriti brutally to destroy Srikant. Dhriti convinces Salman to free her and stabs him multiple times with a piece of glass, killing him. She then manages to free herself, but Sajid arrives and knocks her unconscious.
9	"The Final Act"	Raj Nidimoru and Krishna D.K.	Raj Nidimoru and Krishna D.K. Suman Kumar	4 June 2021	60 Minutes
Shinde confirms the location of the house where Dhriti is being held and informs Srikant of Sajid's presence. The police lay siege to the building while Srikant and his team storm into the house, just as Sajid and Syed manage to escape through a window. They find Dhriti, who collapses into the arms of a relieved Shrikant, weeping and sobbing. Srikant sends Dhriti to the hospital while the police engage in a shootout with Sajid and Syed. Syed is taken down first and Sajid starts shooting at the police and is eventually shot and injured by Srikant, who along with the police team corners him and tells him to surrender. Sajid pretends to surrender, but tries to grab a policeman's rifle, following which the remaining officers shoot him down. In the hospital, Dhriti learns about Srikant's true job. Srikant returns to Chennai to lead the T.A.S.C. team while JK is missing. The rebels dismantle the plane and take it to Kicha Farms near Sunguvarchatram. JK is found and hospitalised. The plane is reassembled, and the rebels plan to fly it using an abandoned highway. Meanwhile, Deepan, with the help of embassy officials and the local police, has Bhaskaran arrested in Normandy, and tells him if he doesn't reveal his plans, he will be extradited to India. However, Bhaskaran refuses to comply and commits suicide, much to the dismay of Deepan and the T.A.S.C. team. Srikant, acting on a tip-off from Chellam, reaches the farm. A huge gunfight ensues, and Selvarasan and the remaining rebels are killed. Srikant and Muthu chase Raji as she takes off on the plane. They manage to blow up the plane, thus killing her. The bilateral talks proceed as planned. The T.A.S.C. team is honoured by PM Basu who also personally congratulates Srikant for staking his life in the line of duty. Srikant shares his experience with his family, and the scene ends just as Suchitra starts to divulge. The season ends with details of how India was affected by the COVID-19 pandemic. An agent in Kolkata gets the go-ahead from his Chinese handler for a mission named Project Guan Yu.

=== Season 3 (2025) ===
No.	Title	Directed by	Written by	Original release date	Length (Minutes)
1	"The Peace Problem"	Raj Nidimoru and Krishna D.K. Tusshar Seyth; Suman Kumar	Raj Nidimoru and Krishna D.K. Suman Kumar; Dialogues: Sumit Aroraa	21 November 2025	57 Minutes
Explosions in the Northeast threaten PM Basu’s peace agenda. Srikant and Suchitra move into a new flat purchased by her, while Dhriti pursues activism in college and Atharv does ballet. In Nagaland, Srikant and Kulkarni meet David Khuzou, who hopes to unite rebels under Project Sahukar against Beijing’s Project Guan Yu. His grandson Stephen, the leader of MCA rebels, rejects the offer and vows to sabotage it. Meanwhile in England, billionaire Dwarkanath "Dwarak" and The Collective, a group of defense contractors aided by freelance contractor Meera Eston push for a deal with Basu, who sidelines it due to its overpriced value. Suchitra loses her job after Basu bans ShrinkMe, a Chinese funded company she works at. Meera recruits smuggler Rukma with the help of Major Sameer; disguised as MCA rebels, Rukma ambushes Kulkarni’s convoy, kills David and murders Kulkarni in front of a badly wounded Srikant.
2	"It's Personal"	Raj Nidimoru and Krishna D.K.	Raj Nidimoru and Krishna D.K. Tusshar Seyth; Suman Kumar	21 November 2025	54 Minutes
Recovering from the attack, Srikant learns about Kulkarni's demise. With the help of JK, Punit and Ajit, he identifies the attacker as Rukma and tips NCB officers about Rukma's farmhouse resulting in a shootout which leaves Rukma's girlfriend Nima dead while he escapes with her son Bobby. Meera rejects Sameer's offer to assist her. Basu authorizes an investigation of Kulkarni's death. Meanwhile, Meera learns about Srikant's pursuit from Dwarak, and after being warned by Sameer about Srikant, starts a smear campaign against the latter.
3	"Wanted Man"	Raj Nidimoru and Krishna D.K.	Raj Nidimoru and Krishna D.K. Tusshar Seyth; Suman Kumar	21 November 2025	57 Minutes
Srikant is relieved from TASC after being declared a suspect on Kulkarni's murder, but discreetly investigates with JK, Punit and Ajit. Dhriti is suspended from college and Suchitra faces public trolling due to Meera's smear campaign; Atharv is also suspended from school following an altercation and learns about Srikant's secret spy job. Agent Yatish captures Chuba, an MCA rebel who followed Kulkarni's convoy, while Stephen evades arrest during a press meet and is declared wanted. Sameer recruits MI6 agent Martin to probe Meera and Dwarak, while Rukma defies orders and continues working for Meera. Punit discovers TASC’s servers were breached and their phones, including those of Srikant’s family, are tapped. Warned of an arrest by JK due to the smear campaign, Srikant escapes with his family after discarding their phones.
4	"Don't Worry Be Happy"	Raj Nidimoru and Krishna D.K.	Raj Nidimoru and Krishna D.K. Tusshar Seyth; Suman Kumar	21 November 2025	54 Minutes
JK, Srikant and his family change their identities in a train. Basu decides to organize a peace rally in Kohima. Rukma finds out about Srikant's identity from Meera. Zoya joins in Yatish's team and assists them, seemingly turning against Srikant. Sameer offers CIA agent Bruce a list of Chinese sleeper cells embedded across the US and learns about Basu's deal with Dwarak and The Collective. Dhriti confronts Srikant regarding his divorce with Suchitra. Srikant learns about Basu's peace rally and goes to Kohima, trailed by Yatish and his team. Rukma trains Bobby into planting a bomb at the peace rally. After planting the bomb, Bobby gets lost in the crowd, but is rescued by Rukma, who triggers the bomb.
5	"Crossing the Line"	Raj Nidimoru and Krishna D.K.	Raj Nidimoru and Krishna D.K. Tusshar Seyth; Suman Kumar	21 November 2025	44 Minutes
The bomb halts the peace rally, prompting PM Basu to order an unofficial strike by Major Vikram on Stephen and his rebels in Myanmar. Meera arrives in India, advises Rukma to leave Bobby with Nima’s parents, then heads to Myanmar with Rukma to recruit Burmese soldiers for her next nefarious plan. Zazu, an MCA loyalist emails Meera, Srikant and Yatish's groups denying MCA’s role in David and Kulkarni’s deaths and offers evidence. Hackers trace him; Srikant insists Stephen isn’t behind the attack and offers his number to a rebel who accesses Zazu's account. Vikram’s mission leads to an ambush with many casualties, and later Srikant and JK are kidnapped by Stephen's men.
6	"With Friends Like You..."	Raj Nidimoru and Krishna D.K.	Raj Nidimoru and Krishna D.K. Tusshar Seyth; Suman Kumar	21 November 2025	53 Minutes
PM Basu covers up the failed strike. Srikant uncovers Rukma’s deal with General Zu Long and Meera’s role through Stephen, and orders Sharma to investigate her. Yatish’s team captures Saloni and Srikant’s family. Sameer predicts an arms race and vows to block Basu’s pact with The Collective. Sambit is exposed as a mole after tipping off Dwarak. Zoya, secretly working for Srikant, aids Saloni. In Manipur, Srikant, JK, and Stephen meet Michael Vedanayagam, who sends Subbu with them. Dwarak alerts Meera her cover is blown, forcing her to act. Rukma emerges as the mastermind of Vikram’s ambush, holding him and four soldiers hostage and leaking proof online. Basu orders a rescue mission and to find the insurgents. Yatish, revealed as Rukma’s ally, tries to kidnap Srikant’s family but is injured by Zoya, who along with Saloni frees them. Meanwhile, Srikant, JK, Stephen, and Subbu slip across the border under cover of night.
7	"Endgame"	Raj Nidimoru and Krishna D.K.	Raj Nidimoru and Krishna D.K. Tusshar Seyth; Suman Kumar	21 November 2025	52 Minutes
Basu approves the arms deal with Dwarak and prepares for war with China after the failed strike. Meera flees to Chiang Mai, leaving Rukma in charge, whom Long confronts for exposing their existence in the media. Arriving in Myanmar, Srikant and his team learn about the failed strike and Vikram's capture, deciding to rescue him and the soldiers; Zoya extracts a confession from Yatish, exonerating Srikant and his family and enabling their return to Mumbai. Dwarak arrives in Delhi and gets Basu to accept the deal by turning public opinion in his favor. Sneaking into Long's base, Srikant and his team are caught by Rukma, who imprisons them, but a backup team rescues them; they plant C4 in the base as a distraction for their escape; Stephen, JK and Vikram escape from the base with the soldiers while Srikant fights Rukma, injuring each other. Rukma escapes from Srikant, who also escapes when Long's backup team arrives. Sameer assassinates Meera in Chiang Mai, and Srikant collapses from his wounds in the jungles of Myanmar, ending on a cliffhanger.

== Production ==
=== Development ===
In November 2017, filmmakers Raj Nidimoru and Krishna D.K. planned to direct a streaming series, with Akshaye Khanna hired as the lead role. It was touted to be a socio-political thriller, with Khanna initially agreeing to the series after accepting the script finalised by Raj Nidimoru, but due to budget constraints in which Khanna charged a huge amount for the series, the makers replaced him with Manoj Bajpayee as the lead character in December 2017. On 30 August 2023, in an interview, Aswani Dutt revealed the story was originally crafted by Raj & DK for Chiranjeevi. However, Chiranjeevi turned down the project due to reservations about his character having two children. Subsequently, the story was adapted into a series with a different cast, and it garnered favourable reviews. The ten-episode series, tentatively titled as The Family Man, marked the digital debut of Bajpayee. On 13 June 2018, Amazon Prime Video, which bagged the streaming rights, officially announced the series, stating it as an "edgy drama-action series with a touch of wry humour, drawing from real incidents".

In an interview with Scroll.in, Raj and D.K. said the series is closely based to Shor in the City (2011), in terms of its tone, stating, "It is dramatic and edgy with action involved. The humour is the kind of stuff that comes just from working in and dealing with the system or bureaucracy in our country. The series draws from contemporary geopolitical issues, and most plot threads are inspired from newspaper headlines over the years." A Deccan Chronicle article released in September 2019, stated the series features similarities with actual events. The makers announced a third season in May 2020. Soon after the release and success of the second season, the third season set in North East India was announced to be in development.

=== Casting ===
Manoj Bajpayee plays the role of Srikant Tiwari, a middle-class man who works for a National Investigation Agency cell. While he tries to protect the nation from terrorists, he also has to protect his family from the impact of his secretive, high-pressure, and low-paying job.

"There is a lot of content out there for people to watch, so it becomes essential for us to not only make our series sincerely and sensitively but also to tell a unique story – something that concerns the common man and his uncommon life with his extra-ordinary struggle. To balance not only his family but also his job which is very, very demanding."

— Manoj Bajpayee, about his character Srikant Tiwari in the series, in an interview with PTI

As the storyline spans around various places in India, the makers chose actors from various states such as Karnataka, Andhra Pradesh, Kerala, Tamil Nadu, Jammu and Kashmir, Uttar Pradesh, and Maharashtra. In an interview with The Indian Express, actor Kishore Kumar G was approached by Sumanth, a writer from Y Not Studios, who was writing for The Family Man, to play the role of a Commando in the series. Priyamani plays the role of Suchitra, Srikanth's wife and also an associate professor in the psychology department. About her character Suchitra, she stated that "She's a typical working wife and someone who is not afraid of expressing herself. She's a multi-tasking woman and someone who, even though she has her hands full, wants to do more." Sharad Kelkar plays the role of Arvind, an associate professor, who is trying to become an entrepreneur. Neeraj Madhav, in his digital debut, plays the role of Moosa, a 24-year old IIT engineer, who gets involved with ISIS. Sundeep Kishan plays the role of Major Vikram. The cast members also includes Sharib Hashmi, Sunny Hinduja and Shreya Dhanwanthary in pivotal roles.

On 28 November 2019, Samantha Ruth Prabhu announced her confirmation in the second season of the series, thus marking her digital debut. Samantha plays the role of the main antagonist Raji, a rebel leader, with Neeraj Madhav's character Moosa was expected for a comeback in the second season. Apart from the cast members of the first season, the second season features Shahab Ali, Vedant Sinha, Mime Gopi, Ravindra Vijay, Devadarshini, Chetan, Anandsami and N. Alagamperumal.

=== Filming ===
==== Season 1 ====
Filming for Season 1 took place on 13 June 2018 when it was announced. Most of the portions were filmed in Mumbai, with some sequences filmed at Ladakh, Delhi, Jammu and Kashmir and Kerala. In August 2018, Raj and Krishna said in an interview a huge chunk is built in Kashmir, for which they interacted with the people in localities, exploring the livelihood of the people and their perspectives of their world they live in. The Kashmir sequences were shot first during early 2018.

A scene at the Ballad Estate in South Mumbai was shot in a single take, with a span of 7–11 minutes. Raj and DK stated the camera is inside the car for half the action sequence. In order to resemble the sets of Balochistan, as the team was denied permission to shoot in the country, a huge set was built in Ladakh to resemble Balochistan. Another sequence was shot in a live hospital located in Mumbai which spanned around 13 minutes. In an interview with Film Companion, the makers stated "The location was expensive and we got it only for 2 nights. We had to come up with the entire sequence and rehearse and stage everything on the first night and the next night we had to light everything and shoot. I am really proud of the team because you don't really pull off stuff like this in one day." The shooting was completed in May 2019.

==== Season 2 ====
On 28 November 2019, Raj and D. K. announced for a second season of the series, followed by the commencement of the shooting. Filming of the first schedule, which took place across Mumbai, was wrapped up on 2 March 2020, before the COVID-19 pandemic lockdown in India. Filming resumed in July 2020, adhering to the safety guidelines imposed by the government, in order to curb COVID-19 spread. Samantha started dubbing for her portions on 28 August 2020, whereas Manoj Bajpayee started dubbing on 14 September. On 25 September 2020, the makers announced that the principal shoot has been wrapped, followed by the completion of post-production on 16 October. The second season focused on the Tamil Eelam struggle in Sri Lanka led by late LTTE leader Captain Prabhakaran. Although there were protests against the portrayal of the LTTE, the series was broadcast without further issues.

==== Season 3 ====
In the finale of Season 2, a third season was teased on the topic of the COVID-19 pandemic in India, set in Northeast India alongside Kolkata, Mumbai, and Delhi, with a Chinese antagonist. Shooting began in May 2024.

== Music ==
The Family Man: Season 1 consists of fourteen songs used in the series. The soundtrack has music composed by Sachin–Jigar, Divya Limbasia, Mahesh Shankar, The Local Train, Jaan Nissar Lone, Aabha Hanjura, Thaikkudam Bridge and Underground Authority. For the second season, Sachin–Jigar, Fiddlecraft, Mahesh Shankar and Shonha Raja composed the music. The background score is composed by Ketan Sodha. The albums consists of songs with Balochi, Kashmiri, Malayalam, Sanskrit and Tamil lyrics, apart from featuring songs written in Hindi languages.

== Release ==
=== Season 1 ===
The Family Man: Season 1 was showcased at the Television Critics Association's summer press tour held in Los Angeles in February 2019. On 15 July 2019, Amazon Prime Video announced five new series in production, where a first poster released on the occasion of Prime Day celebrations. The series with 10 episodes was announced for a release on September. The photoshoot of the teaser poster, shot using a One Plus mobile camera, was released on 30 August 2019, along with the teaser. The official trailer was unveiled on 2 September 2019. Amazon Prime Video released the series in English, Hindi, Tamil and Telugu languages on 19 September 2019, ahead of the initially scheduled release of 20 September, in more than 200 countries. The series became the most-watched Indian web show on Amazon Prime Video.

=== Season 2 ===
In May 2020, filmmakers Raj and Krishna stated the second season of the series will be released in the last quarter of 2020, as the post-production process (sound, music creating, VFX work) may take four months to complete. But it was eventually delayed to 2021, citing the completion of visual effects. A sneak peek of the second season was released on 20 September 2020, coinciding with the release date of the first season. A new poster of the second season was released on 29 December 2020, and on 7 January 2021, the makers announced the release date as 12 February 2021. The makers unveiled the teaser of the second season on 13 January 2021. To promote the trailer launch event on 19 January 2021, Amazon Prime Video announced the first season of the series will be made accessible to all users without subscriptions, from 14 to 19 January. However, the trailer was not eventually released, due to the controversy over Tandav, which premiered on the same platform.

In late January 2021, there were reports claiming the second season will be postponed due to the legal tussles over Amazon Prime and their series Tandav and Mirzapur, for hurting religious sentiments. It was reported the series features similar content to that of the former and Amazon Prime had decided to postpone the season in the outburst of controversies, so they have time to edit the series as a part of post-production. The same was confirmed by the creator duo Raj and DK, however they did not quote the controversy over Tandav.

The trailer was later released on 19 May 2021, and the episodes were released a few hours before midnight on 4 June 2021. Due to technical issues, episodes were released only in Hindi and not in Tamil or Telugu on that day. The dubbed versions were released during mid-August 2021.

== Controversies ==
=== Season 1 ===
On 28 September 2019, the Rashtriya Swayamsevak Sangh raised objection over a few scenes in the series about the situation in Jammu and Kashmir. An RSS-affiliated magazine Panchajanya stated "In the series, a woman affiliated to the National Investigation Agency is shown speaking to her male colleague at Srinagar's Lal Chowk, decrying the fact that the Kashmiris were being oppressed by the Indian state as it had shut down phones and internet and used measures like the Armed Forces (Special Powers) Act. At one point she asks her male colleague, who appears quite affected by her talk, whether there is any difference between the Indian officials and militants." The magazine also accused the makers of creating sympathy for terrorists.

=== Season 2 ===
On 24 May 2021, the Government of Tamil Nadu wrote to the Central government seeking immediate action either to stop or ban the release of the second season of the series on Amazon Prime Video across the country. Mano Thangaraj, the Information Technology Minister of Tamil Nadu, in his letter to Prakash Javadekar, Union Minister for Information and Broadcasting, said "the web series (due to release in June 2021) not only hurt the sentiments of Eelam Tamils but also the feelings of the people of Tamil Nadu and if allowed to broadcast, it would be prejudicial to the maintenance of harmony in the State". Several other Tamil Nadu political leaders, including Seeman and Vaiko condemned the series, stating the series depicts Tamilians as terrorists and demanded a pan-India ban.

== Reception ==
=== Critical response ===
==== Season 1 ====
Rohan Naahar of the Hindustan Times wrote "Without ever parodying the genre, The Family Man succeeds at being a surprisingly funny spy series; equally capable of snappy one-liners as it is of slick thrills." Karan Sanjay Shah of Rediff.com rated it four out of five and called it a "raw, engaging, well-written espionage drama that will keep you on the edge of your seat". Suresh Mathew of The Quint gave it a three-and-a-half out of five and distinguished it from Sacred Games by saying, "What makers Raj and DK bring to The Family Man is a total mastery over the craft of storytelling. Unlike, say a Sacred Games, The Family Man manages to remain eminently accessible while still retaining its finesse."

Ektaa Malik of The Indian Express gave three out of five stars, writing "The performances by Manoj Bajpayee and Sharib Hashmi are stellar as are the dialogues." Raja Sen of Mint also appreciated Bajpayee's role saying, "Bajpayee is alone reason enough to keep watching The Family Man." Swetha Ramakrishnan of Firstpost gave three out of five stars and stated, "The Family Man's version of a family man is someone who can't juggle his work duties and familial duties and we're supposed to find the comedy in that." Akhil Arora of NDTV wrote "On one hand, The Family Man shows itself to be very socially and politically aware but its inelegant handling of exposition, and inability to be tonally cohesive lets it down." Ananya Bhattacharya of India Today wrote "Despite Manoj Bajpayee's work, The Family Man is really a dampener."

Nandini Ramanth of Scroll.in wrote "There are moments in the early episodes when it appears Raj and DK are sending up the tradecraft genre and not taking this terrorist-hunting business too seriously. It is sometimes hard to tell whether Srikant is being serious or sardonic. Manoj Bajpayee's ability to suggest both states initially keeps The Family Man in a midway zone between muscular nationalist thriller and a True Lies-style spoof." An Indo-Asian News Service critic gave three-and-a-half out of five stars and wrote "If you like binge-watching, this one is for you. Like many of the characters in it, The Family Man leaves us viewers with no choice."

The New Indian Express's critic Kaushani Bannerjee reviewed "Despite the pace and the predictability of things, the show neither tries to be preachy about tolerance or peace nor portrays a black and white picture of patriots and terrorists. It depicts both sides of the story in a balanced manner underscoring the fact that nobody is born a terrorist and even the hero needs to deal with mundane issues of life." Rahul Desai of Film Companion wrote "It's in the smaller – and uncompromising – details of The Family Man that we sense how director-duo Raj & D.K. can transcend their 'quirky' reputation if given the leeway".

Tanul Thakur of The Wire stated "The Family Man is elevated to a large extent by not just its writing and technical finesse – making the show tense and unpredictable – but also acting." Jennifer Keishin Armstrong of BBC News wrote "The Family Man turns on such satisfying juxtapositions, constantly pitting Sri's disastrous personal instincts against his superhuman – though not infallible – skill in his role at the National Investigation Agency, rooting out terrorists who flourish in and around India (his family thinks he has an ordinary desk job)."

==== Season 2 ====
Shubhra Gupta from The Indian Express stated "The Manoj Bajpayee show significantly raises its stakes in the second season, casting its net wider, and manages to get in a larger context about the state of the world we are living in." Tatsam Mukherjee from Firstpost gave high praises for season 2 and wrote "The Family Man S02 is a stellar continuation of a homegrown spy franchise, one that seamlessly switches between Tamil, Hindi and English." Sangeetha Devi Dundoo of The Hindu wrote "The new season of 'The Family Man' is fun and absorbing, led by the ever-dependable Manoj Bajpayee and a fiery Samantha Ruth Prabhu."

==== Season 3 ====
Rahul Desai from The Hollywood Reporter India wrote though "the series continues to nail the fundamental genre points... there are aspects of The Family Man 3 that make it lesser than previous seasons." Saraswati Datar from The Indian Express stated "Season 3 of The Family Man, though entertaining to watch, underwhelms in comparison to its predecessors" Anuj Kumar of The Hindu wrote "What felt revolutionary six years ago is now the default mode. Humanising espionage and family drama, the very thing that made The Family Man stand out among his contemporaries, has now become formulaic."

Trisha Gaur of Koimoi rated the season 3.5 out of 5 stars and wrote "It has the emotional depth along with the signature humor that is much needed to let the series breathe and grow." Radhika Sharma of NDTV gave 2.5 out of 5 stars and wrote "The Family Man 3, inarguably a technically superior chapter, but the weakest one, traverses the entire Northeast with Nagaland seeing the most action." Shweta Keshri of India Today gave 3.5 out of 5 stars, and wrote "The show weaves in real-world issues like strategic pressure, economic vulnerabilities and the impact of long-term conflict without ever feeling preachy or weighed down."

=== Accolades ===
Award (Note: Awards, festivals and organisations are in alphabetical order.)	Date of ceremony (Note: Date is linked to the article about the awards held that year, wherever possible.)	Category	Recipient	Result	Ref.
Asian Academy Creative Awards	16 October 2020	Best Drama Series	The Family Man – Season 1	Won	
Asian Academy Creative Awards	16 October 2020	Best Actor in a Leading Role	Manoj Bajpayee	Won	
Asian Academy Creative Awards	16 October 2020	Best Direction (Fiction)	Raj Nidimoru and Krishna D.K.	Won	
Asian Academy Creative Awards	16 October 2020	Best Original Screenplay	Raj Nidimoru and Krishna D.K. and Suman Kumar	Won	
Asian Academy Creative Awards	1 October 2021	Best Actor in a Leading Role	Manoj Bajpayee	Won	
Filmfare OTT Awards	19 December 2020	Best Drama Series	The Family Man – Season 1	Nominated	
Filmfare OTT Awards	19 December 2020	Best Director	Raj Nidimoru and Krishna D.K.	Nominated	
Filmfare OTT Awards	19 December 2020	Best Actor – Male (Critics)	Manoj Bajpayee	Won	
Filmfare OTT Awards	19 December 2020	Best Actor – Female (Critics)	Priyamani	Won	
Filmfare OTT Awards	19 December 2020	Best Series (Critics)	The Family Man – Season 1	Won	
Filmfare OTT Awards	19 December 2020	Best Director (Critics)	Raj Nidimoru and Krishna D.K.	Won	
Filmfare OTT Awards	19 December 2020	Best Actor – Male	Manoj Bajpayee	Nominated	
Filmfare OTT Awards	19 December 2020	Best Actor – Female	Priyamani	Nominated	
Filmfare OTT Awards	19 December 2020	Best Original Story	Raj Nidimoru and Krishna D.K. and Suman Kumar	Nominated	
Filmfare OTT Awards	19 December 2020	Best Screenplay	Raj Nidimoru and Krishna D.K. and Suman Kumar	Nominated	
Filmfare OTT Awards	19 December 2020	Best Dialogues	Raj Nidimoru and Krishna D.K., Sumit Arora and Suman Kumar	Won	
Filmfare OTT Awards	9 December 2021	Best Drama Series	The Family Man – Season 2	Nominated	
Filmfare OTT Awards	9 December 2021	Best Director	Raj Nidimoru and Krishna D.K.	Nominated	
Filmfare OTT Awards	9 December 2021	Best Actor – Male	Manoj Bajpayee	Nominated	
Filmfare OTT Awards	9 December 2021	Best Actor – Female	Samantha Ruth Prabhu	Won	
Filmfare OTT Awards	9 December 2021	Best Supporting Actor (Male)	Sharib Hashmi	Won	
Filmfare OTT Awards	9 December 2021	Best Supporting Actor (Male)	Sunny Hinduja	Nominated	
Filmfare OTT Awards	9 December 2021	Best Supporting Actor (Female)	Ashlesha Thakur	Nominated	
Filmfare OTT Awards	9 December 2021	Best Original Story	Raj Nidimoru and Krishna D.K. and Suman Kumar	Won	
Filmfare OTT Awards	9 December 2021	Best Screenplay	Raj Nidimoru and Krishna D.K., Suparn Verma and Suman Kumar	Won	
Filmfare OTT Awards	9 December 2021	Best Dialogue	Manoj Kumar Kalaivanan and Suparn Verma	Nominated	
Filmfare OTT Awards	9 December 2021	Best Director (Critics)	Raj Nidimoru and Krishna D.K.	Won	
Filmfare OTT Awards	9 December 2021	Best Actor – Male (Critics)	Manoj Bajpayee	Won	
Indian Film Festival of Melbourne Awards	20 August 2021	Best Web Series	The Family Man – Season 2	Nominated	
Indian Film Festival of Melbourne Awards	20 August 2021	Best Performance (Male) in Web Series	Manoj Bajpayee	Won	
Indian Film Festival of Melbourne Awards	20 August 2021	Best Performance (Female) in Web Series	Samantha Ruth Prabhu	Won	
