= Citadel: Honey Bunny =

Indian television series by Raj & DK

- Promotional poster
- Genre: Action; Drama; Spy thriller; Techno-thriller
- Developed by: Sita R. Menon
- Written by: Sita R. Menon; Raj & DK; Dialogues: Sumit Arora; Denzil Frank
- Directed by: Raj & DK
- Starring: Varun Dhawan; Samantha Ruth Prabhu; Kay Kay Menon; Simran Bagga; Sikandar Kher; Saqib Saleem
- Music by: Sachin-Jigar; Fiddlecraft; When Chai Met Toast; Outfly
- Composers: Aman Pant; Alex Belcher
- Country of origin: India
- Original language: Hindi
- No. of seasons: 1
- No. of episodes: 6

Production
- Executive producers: Anthony Russo; Joe Russo; Mike Larocca; Angela Russo-Otstot; Scott Nemes; David Weil; Raj & DK
- Producers: Syed Zaid Ali; Alek Conic
- Cinematography: Johan Heurlin Aidt
- Editor: Sumeet Kotian
- Running time: 42–54 minutes
- Production companies: Amazon MGM Studios; Gozie AGBO; Midnight Radio; PKM; Picrow; d2r Films

Original release
- Network: Amazon Prime Video
- Release: 6 November 2024

Related
- Citadel; Citadel: Diana (Italy)

Citadel: Honey Bunny is an Indian Hindi-language spy action television series directed by Raj & DK, who co-wrote with Sita R. Menon. It is the spin-off to the American television series Citadel on Amazon Prime Video and revolves around the story of Honey and Bunny, who are related to the character Nadia Sinh (played by Priyanka Chopra in the original series). The series stars Varun Dhawan and Samantha Ruth Prabhu as the title characters with Kay Kay Menon, Simran, Sikandar Kher, Saqib Saleem, Soham Majumdar, Shivankit Singh Parihar and Thalaivasal Vijay in supporting roles.

Citadel: Honey Bunny was released on 6 November 2024. In April 2025, the series was canceled after one season with the intention to integrate some of its storylines in Citadel's second season.

== Plot ==
=== 1992 ===
Rahi "Bunny" Gambhir works as a stunt double in Bollywood, but leads a secret life as a spy for Guru alias "Baba". Bunny’s team consists of Chacko and Ludo, who are like family to him. One day, Bunny meets Hanimandakini Honey Raj, a struggling actress (flashback reveals she's the illegitimate daughter of a royal family in Andhra Pradesh). They start to get close and he eventually asks her to join him for a side gig. Honey agrees, but things go wrong when they are intercepted by Zooni's led by Shaan, and she gets shot. Honey recovers at Bunny's place and he reveals his background and secret life as a spy to her. They fall in love and Honey decides to become an agent, where Bunny trains her and eventually lets her join the team.

Their next mission takes them to Belgrade to track down Dr. Raghu Rao, who is supposed to be there to retrieve a device called Armada, from Dr. Pavel. Armada is a high-tech gadget that can track important individuals and is valuable in arms dealing, something Zooni has her eyes on. Honey finds out she is pregnant and discovers that Dr. Raghu is an innocent civilian. Bunny promises her that Raghu will not be harmed, but Baba orders him to kill Dr. Raghu anyway. Zooni is revealed to be leading Citadel. Devastated by Dr.'s death and realising she's on the wrong side, Honey leaks Baba’s location to Citadel and has him arrested. Honey reveals her pregnancy to Bunny and escapes with the Armada. However, Kedar KD, a new recruit, attacks Honey’s car, seemingly killing her. Bunny is fired by Baba believing him to be responsible for getting Honey into their lives.

=== 2000 ===
Honey has survived and is now living in hiding with her daughter Nadia, in Nainital. Baba's new agents eventually track them down to retrieve the Armada. Bunny, who now works as a singer in Bucharest, finds out that Honey and his daughter are still alive through a secured online chat with Ludo. Bunny reunites with Chacko and they start looking for Honey. KD is sent to hunt Honey down, but Bunny intercepts him at Base 33 and kills his team, alerting Baba. Honey takes Nadia to the ancestral palace in Andhra Pradesh where she was born and grew up and tells her about her past.

Bunny, Chacko, and Ludo locate a Citadel base in Mumbai and track Honey’s whereabouts. They discover that Zooni Shatsang, the Director of Citadel India, has been working with Baba and even helped him escape from Citadel's custody in 1999. Baba was an ex-Citadel agent and managed to turn Zooni by spinning emotional stories about her husband, Rinzy who was also Baba's best friend. Honey passes this information to Shaan, Zooni's colleague, who arrests her. Meanwhile, Bunny goes to Baba and destroys the Armada in front of him, telling him to now leave his family alone.

Honey and Bunny regroup at her ancestral palace, but KD and his team track down and attack them, ignoring Baba’s orders not to attack them; KD continues the assault. The palace is left in ruins, but Honey, Bunny, and Nadia narrowly escape. They are ambushed again by KD and Bunny lets Honey and Nadia escape, while he stays behind to face him. In a final showdown, they shoot each other, but survive; Bunny convinces KD to see how Baba has been manipulating young recruits like them all along. More agents arrive to capture Bunny and Honey, but Bunny stands ready to fight back, while Honey and Nadia wait for him, ending the show at a cliffhanger.

== Cast and characters ==
=== Main ===
- Varun Dhawan as Raahi "Bunny" Gambhir, Honey's lover and Nadia's father
  - Jihan Jeetendra Hodar as young Bunny (Ep 2)
- Samantha as Hanimandakini "Honey" Raj, Bunny's lover and Nadia's mother / "Noorie" / "Maadhavi Kumar"
- Kashvi Majmundar as Nadia, daughter of Bunny and Honey
- Kay Kay Menon as Guru aliases "Baba" and "Vishwa"
- Sikandar Kher as Shaan
- Saqib Saleem as Kedar "KD"
- Simran as Zooni Shatsang alias "Eagle", Director of Citadel India and Guru's past friend
- Soham Majumdar as Ludo
- Shivankit Singh Parihar as Chacko

=== Recurring ===
- Bhuvan Arora as Honey's actor friend
- Shashank Vyas as Vivek, the owner of a Bakery and Honey's friend
- Mohit R. Thakur as Jagan; Rahi, Chacko, and Ludo's friend
- Armaan Khera as Nakul
- Vikrant Koul as Agent Vinod
- Raimundo Querido as Jaby
- Michael Teh as Mr. Jiming
- Supurna Malakar as Leena, Chacko's wife
- Shilpi Arora as Guru's wife (Ep 1)
- Thalaivasal Vijay as Dr. Raghu Rao (Ep 2-3)
- Ajith Koshy as Seshadri Raj, Narasimharaja's brother and Honey's uncle
- Yash Puri as Pratapa Rudra Raj, Honey's half-brother
- Mukhtar Khan as Raja Narasimharaja Pratap, Honey and Pratapa's father
- Shruthi Narayanan as Nanjamani, Honey's mother (Ep 2)
- Hardika Sharma as young Honey (Ep 2)
- Arush as young Pratapa, Honey's half-brother (Ep 2)
- Kamtam Kiran Kumar as Honey's husband
- Juhi Arora as Bunny's mother (Ep 2)

=== Guest ===
- Aejaz Gulab as Stunt Master (Ep 1)
- Raksha Kumawat as Apartment Girl 1 (Ep 1)
- Shiva Rindani as the Film Director (Ep 1)
- Praveen Nithariya as Casting Director Amar (Ep 1)
- Izudin Bajrovic as Dr. Pavel, Dr. Raghu's friend and colleague
- Statsa Nikolic as Sofia, a girl Bunny met in the bar
- Parmeet Sethi as David D'Souza, Disc Keeper (Epi 1)
- Ajith Koshy as Guard Seshadri (Ep 2)

== Episodes ==
No.	Title	Directed by	Written by	Original release date	Length (minutes)
1	"Dancing and Fighting"	Raj Nidimoru and Krishna D.K.	Sita R. Menon; Raj Nidimoru and Krishna D.K. Dialogues: Sumit Arora	6 November 2024	52 minutes
In 2000, Honey is raising her school-aged daughter Nainital. In 1992, Honey is auditioning to be an actress in Bombay. Guru, to whom Bunny reports, has the code-name "Vishwa".
2	"Talwar"	Raj Nidimoru and Krishna D.K.	Sita R. Menon; Raj Nidimoru and Krishna D.K. Dialogues: Sumit Arora	6 November 2024	55 minutes
3	"Spy Game"	Raj Nidimoru and Krishna D.K.	Sita R. Menon; Raj Nidimoru and Krishna D.K. Dialogues: Sumit Arora	6 November 2024	47 minutes
4	"Home"	Raj Nidimoru and Krishna D.K.	Sita R. Menon; Raj Nidimoru and Krishna D.K. Dialogues: Sumit Arora	6 November 2024	52 minutes
5	"Traitor"	Raj Nidimoru and Krishna D.K.	Sita R. Menon; Raj Nidimoru and Krishna D.K. Dialogues: Sumit Arora	6 November 2024	43 minutes
6	"Play"	Raj Nidimoru and Krishna D.K.	Sita R. Menon; Raj Nidimoru and Krishna D.K. Dialogues: Sumit Arora	6 November 2024	54 minutes

== Production ==
=== Development ===
In December 2022, Anthony and Joe Russo announced the Indian spin-off of Citadel.

=== Casting ===
Varun Dhawan and Samantha Ruth Prabhu play the lead cast in the series as Bunny and Honey.

=== Filming ===
Filming of the series began in January 2023. The series was shot in Serbia and India. Filming wrapped on 13 July 2023.

== Soundtrack ==
Citadel: Honey Bunny

Soundtrack album by Sachin-Jigar, Fiddlecraft, When Chai Met Toast, Outfly, Aman Pant and Alex Belcher
- Released: 5 November 2024
- Recorded: 2023–2024
- Genre: Feature film soundtrack
- Length: 29:51
- Language: Hindi
- Label: T-Series

Official audio
- Citadel: Honey Bunny (Audio Jukebox) on YouTube

Track listing
No.	Title	Lyrics	Music	Singer(s)	Length
1.	"Honey Bunny"	Priya Saraiya	Sachin-Jigar	Sachin–Jigar, Ash King, Shubham Kabra, Shruti Dhasmana	3:03
2.	"Yeh Safar"	Priya Saraiya	Sachin-Jigar	Sachin-Jigar, Shilpa Rao, Osho Jain	2:55
3.	"Tufaan"	Fiddlecraft	Fiddlecraft	Fiddlecraft	2:46
4.	"Blue Skies"	When Chai Met Toast, Siddhant Kaushal	When Chai Met Toast	When Chai Met Toast	2:11
5.	"Rihaa"	Akshay Poojary	Outfly	Gravity	2:44
6.	"Ghum Hain Kahin"	Ramil Ganjoo, Akhil Tiwari	Aman Pant	Papon	3:58
7.	"Zaroori To Nahi"	Akhil Tiwari	Aman Pant	Kinjal Chatterjee	4:05
8.	"Beast Mode"	Abin Thomas, Rob C, Pratika	Aman Pant	Rohan Pathak, Rob C, Pratika	2:36
9.	"Title Theme" (Instrumental)	–	Aman Pant, Alex Belcher	–	0:59
10.	"Zaroori To Nahi" (Live Version)	Akhil Tiwari	Aman Pant	Manoj Mishra	4:34
Total length:					29:51

== Reception ==
On the review aggregator website Rotten Tomatoes, 80% of 15 critics' reviews are positive, with an average rating of 6.1/10. Saibal Chatterjee of NDTV gave it 2 stars out of 5 with comments, "The series does not exactly go down in flames but neither does it have us holding our breath as its action set pieces explode on screen."
