= Farzi =

Indian television series by Raj & DK

- Promotional poster
- Genre: Black comedy Crime thriller
- Created by: Raj & DK
- Written by: Sita Menon; Suman Kumar; Raj & DK
- Directed by: Raj & DK
- Starring: Vijay Sethupathi; Shahid Kapoor; Kay Kay Menon; Raashii Khanna; Bhuvan Arora
- Music by: Ketan Sodha; Sachin–Jigar; Tanishk Bagchi
- Country of origin: India
- Original language: Hindi
- No. of seasons: 1
- No. of episodes: 8

Production
- Producers: Raj & DK
- Cinematography: Pankaj Kumar
- Editor: Sumeet Kotian
- Running time: 42–66 minutes
- Production company: d2r Films

Original release
- Network: Amazon Prime Video
- Release: 10 February 2023 – present

Related
- The Family Man

Farzi: An Original Story About Copying (transl. Fake) is an Indian Hindi-language black comedy crime thriller television series created, produced and directed by Raj & DK, who also co-wrote the series with Sita Menon and Suman Kumar. It stars Vijay Sethupathi, Shahid Kapoor, Kay Kay Menon, Raashii Khanna and Bhuvan Arora, and tells the story of a disillusioned artist who decides to make counterfeit money.

Initially conceived as a film in 2014, Farzi was expanded into a television series by 2019. Principal photography began in Mumbai in July 2021. Filming also took place in Alibag, Goa, Nepal, and Jordan. Sachin–Jigar and Tanishk Bagchi composed the songs, while Ketan Sodha provided the score. The series shares continuity with Raj & DK's spy series The Family Man.

The eight-episode series was released on Amazon Prime Video on 10 February 2023. Farzi received positive reviews, and emerged as the most-watched Indian streaming series. By the end of February 2023, Kapoor confirmed that the show would return for a second season. At the 2023 Filmfare OTT Awards, Farzi received 10 nominations.

In 2026, it was announced that the series was renewed for a second season.

== Premise ==
Sunny is an artist disillusioned by the income inequality in India after failing to keep his grandfather's extensive printing press in business. He decides to team up with his best friend Firoz to make counterfeit money. They face challenges from Mansoor, a gangster, and Michael, a cop. According to co-creator Raj Nidimoru, the title refers to counterfeiting, as well as the "fakeness" inherent in people.

== Cast and characters ==
=== Main ===
- Shahid Kapoor as Sunny, a disillusioned artist who moonlights as money counterfeiter (Tamil Version Voice dubbed by Jiiva)
- Vijay Sethupathi as Michael Vedanayagam, a Special Task Force officer and head of the Counterfeiting & Currency Fraud Analysis & Research Team (CCFART)
- Kay Kay Menon as Mansoor Dalal, a criminal mastermind who heads the counterfeit network in India, based out of Jordan
- Raashii Khanna as Megha Vyas, an officer for the Reserve Bank of India, who later joins CCFART
- Bhuvan Arora as Firoz, Sunny's best friend and partner
- Chittaranjan Giri as Yasir, an employee at Kranti Patrika
- Zakir Hussain as Finance Minister Pawan Gahlot
- Jaswant Singh Dalal as Shekhar Ahlawat, a member of CCFART
- Amol Palekar as Madhav, Sunny's grandfather and owner of Kranti Patrika
- Kubbra Sait as Saira, Mansoor's superior
- Regina Cassandra as Rekha Rao, Michael's ex-wife

=== Recurring ===
- Kavya Thapar as Ananya, Sunny's ex-girlfriend
- Chittaranjan Tripathy as Michael's divorce lawyer
- Lokesh Mittal as Lakdawala
- Vijay Kumar as Jitu Kaka, Mansoor's uncle and manager
- Saqib Ayub as Anees, Sunny and Firoz's friend and a small-time goon
- Karan Maan as Commander Murtaza
- Nilesh Divekar as Bilal, Mansoor's henchman
- Priyadarshini Indalkar as the receptionist at MKG Publishing
- Akkshay Gunaawat as Suparn
- Saurav Chakraborti as Jamal, Mansoor's henchman
- Mrinmayee Godbole as Rekha's divorce lawyer
- Armaan Bhanushali as young Sunny
- Kabir Khan as young Firoz
- Vivek Madaan as Arjun Nayar
- Govind Pandey as MLA Kesaribhai Doshi
- Divyam Shukla as Vyom, Rekha and Michael's son
- Ashutosh Priyadarshi as Titu Khislu, a Bangladeshi smuggler
- Anna Ador as Svetalana

=== Cameo appearance ===
The following actors make cameos, reprising their roles from The Family Man:

- Uday Mahesh as Chellam
- Ajay Jadhav as Sub-Inspector Shinde
- Vijay Vikram Singh as Ajit
- Aritro Rudraneil Banerjee as Punit Banerjee
- Manoj Bajpayee as Srikant Tiwari (voice only)
- Vinay Kumar Yadav as Vada Pav Seller
- Yashwant Giri as Panelist
- Pankaj Bhatia as Reporter

== Episodes ==
No.	Title	Directed by	Written by	Original release date
1	"Artist"	Raj & DK	Raj & DK, Sita Menon, and Suman Kumar	10 February 2023
Sunny is a poor artist, who assists his grandfather Madhav in running an idealistic printing press, alongside his best friend Firoz. Trouble arises when their business is at the risk of bankruptcy. Disillusioned, Sunny and Firoz decide to print counterfeit 500-rupee notes. Initially unsuccessful, their second attempt pays off. Meanwhile, a determined officer, Michael, captures his nemesis, counterfeiting kingpin Mansoor Dalal, in Nepal. However Mansoor escapes. Later, Mansoor kidnaps Sunny and Firoz.
2	"Social Service"	Raj & DK	Raj & DK, Sita Menon, and Suman Kumar	10 February 2023
In a flashback, a young Sunny is abandoned by his father. He meets another abandoned boy, Firoz at a train station and strikes up a friendship. Sunny's maternal grandfather Madhav adopts both him and Firoz. In the present day, Sunny and Firoz are able to pay off their grandfather's debts. Meanwhile, Megha, an idealistic officer for the Reserve Bank of India (RBI), chances upon Sunny's fake note, but is not taken seriously by her superior. Michael blackmails Minister Pawan Gahlot to set up a task force investigating counterfeit money.
3	"CCFART"	Raj & DK	Raj & DK, Sita Menon, and Suman Kumar	10 February 2023
Michael sets up the Counterfeiting and Currency Fraud Analysis and Research Team (CCFART), the task force he wanted through Gahlot's help. He shares a troubled relationship with his ex-wife, Rekha, and son. Megha, dissatisfied with her job at the RBI, joins Michael's team. She soon gets in trouble when she defies Michael to investigate the "artist" whose fake note she had found, and almost busts their operation. Meanwhile, Sunny and Firoz get hired to print fake money for a politician and end up delivering a ₹20 crore shipment to Surat themselves.
4	"Dhanrakshak"	Raj & DK	Raj & DK, Sita Menon, and Suman Kumar	10 February 2023
Rekha sends Michael divorce papers. Megha's fake note scanner, Dhanrakshak, is launched by Gahlot, who believes the media attention will help him win the election. Meanwhile, Madhav suffers from dementia. Mansoor is rattled by the arrests due to Dhanrakshak. Impressed by Sunny's artistry (Dhanrakshak cannot detect his notes), Mansoor kidnaps him and Firoz and makes Sunny an offer to work for his crime organization.
5	"Second Oldest Profession"	Raj & DK	Raj & DK, Sita Menon, and Suman Kumar	10 February 2023
Sunny agrees to start working for Mansoor and produces a fake 2000-rupee note at his lab in Jordan. Mansoor arranges a neuro specialist and pays for Madhav's surgery. In Bangladesh, Mansoor's henchman Bilal is caught by Michael and the team. Michael threatens Bilal and turns him into an informant. Back in Mumbai, Sunny is asked by Mansoor to infiltrate CCFART. He stages a meeting with Megha and manages to hack into her phone.
6	"Cat and Mouse"	Raj & DK	Raj & DK, Sita Menon, and Suman Kumar	10 February 2023
Sunny spies on CCFART's plans through Megha's phone. Michael gets information from Bilal, and another mole in Mansoor's organization. Following a cat-and-mouse game between the two organizations, Mansoor suggests a "Trojan Horse" plan to smuggle ₹12,000 crores in counterfeit notes into India. With help from a Russian boat crew, Sunny manages to trick Michael, successfully smuggling the cash.
7	"Supernote"	Raj & DK	Raj & DK, Sita Menon, and Suman Kumar	10 February 2023
Sunny and Firoz enjoy their wealth and move into plush flats. Sunny finds himself falling for Megha and removes the tracker from her phone. Megha discovers that the "artist" is leaving his signature ('S') in the fake notes. Mansoor is desperate to get the fake cash into the market and urges Sunny to act quickly. Michael devises a plan to lure the "artist".
8	"Crash and Burn"	Raj & DK	Raj & DK, Sita Menon, and Suman Kumar	10 February 2023
Sunny and Firoz almost get caught, but Michael manages to see their faces. To escape from the cops during a chase, Sunny and Firoz scatter the fake cash into the streets. Displeased by this, Mansoor orders them to be killed, but Sunny uses the help of his friends to escape. Mansoor sets fire to Madhav's printing press, seemingly killing him. Angered, Sunny goes on a rampage -- he kills many of Mansoor's men and sets fire to the cash, promising Mansoor that he will be back for more. Meanwhile, Michael and Rekha get divorced. Megha is close to uncovering Sunny's identity.

== Production ==
Farzi was first conceived as a film by Raj & DK with Shahid Kapoor and Nawazuddin Siddiqui in 2014. Kriti Sanon joined the cast by the end of the year. By 2019, it was expanded into a television series with Kapoor still attached. In January 2021, Kapoor confirmed that Raashii Khanna had joined the project. In September 2021, Bhuvan Arora said that he was working on the series. Raj & DK offered a part to Vijay Sethupathi when they were in Chennai filming The Family Man; he joined the production 40 days after they began filming. He credited his co-star Raashii Khanna, with whom he had worked before in Tamil films, for making him comfortable on set.

Principal photography began at Film City, Mumbai in July 2021. Filming also took place in parts of Mumbai, Goa, Alibaug, Nepal, and Jordan. Pankaj Kumar served as the cinematographer.

The series was officially announced by Amazon on 28 April 2022, during the launch exhibit of 40 Indian projects sanctioned by the company. Kapoor, Sethupathi, Khanna, Kay Kay Menon, Regina Cassandra, Zakir Hussain, Bhuvan Arora, Amol Palekar, and Kubbra Sait were all announced to star.

Writer Sita Menon stated that a scene indicating a crossover with Raj & DK's show The Family Man was not pre-planned and that the idea came to Raj on the day of the shoot. DK later confirmed the crossover, stating the worlds in the two series "run parallel to each other".

== Soundtrack ==
Farzi

Soundtrack album by Sachin–Jigar, Tanishk Bagchi
- Released: 28 January 2023
- Length: 8:00
- Language: Hindi
- Label: Sony Music India

Official audio
- Farzi Jukebox on YouTube

The duo Sachin–Jigar, who are frequent collaborators of Raj & DK, composed music for the series. They composed two songs, "Paisa Hai Toh" and "Sab Farzi". Tanishk Bagchi composed the third song, "Aasmaan". A soundtrack album comprising these three songs was released by Sony Music India on 28 January 2023. Another track, "Fark Nahi Padta", composed by Sachin-Jigar, performed by Nikhil Paul George and rapper DRV was released separately in March 2023.

No.	Title	Lyrics	Music	Singer(s)	Length
1.	"Paisa Hai Toh"	Jigar Saraiya	Sachin–Jigar	Vishal Dadlani, MellowD, Sachin–Jigar	3:08
2.	"Sab Farzi"	Priya Saraiya	Sachin–Jigar	Saba Azad, Sachin–Jigar	2:30
3.	"Aasmaan"	Raghav Meattle	Tanishk Bagchi	Raghav Meattle, Anumita Nadesan	2:52

== Release ==
Two first-look posters of Farzi featuring Shahid Kapoor and Vijay Sethupathi were released on 5 January 2023. A week later, on 13 January, the official trailer was released. To promote the show, Prime Video collaborated with Swiggy to send out fake ₹2,000 notes to customers who ordered from the service. The series was released on Amazon Prime Video on 10 February 2023. Later that month, Kapoor confirmed that the series would return for a second season.

In March 2023, a YouTuber named Joravar Singh Kalsi, and his friend Gurpeet Singh, were arrested in Gurgaon for enacting a scene from the series, in which they threw fake currency notes from a speeding car.

== Reception ==
=== Critical response ===
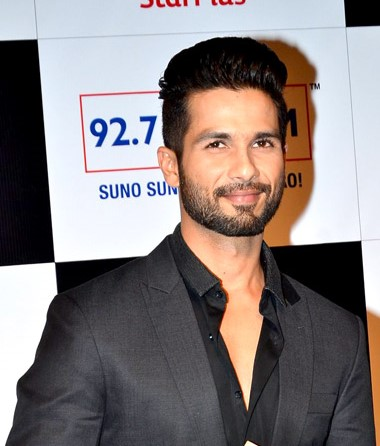
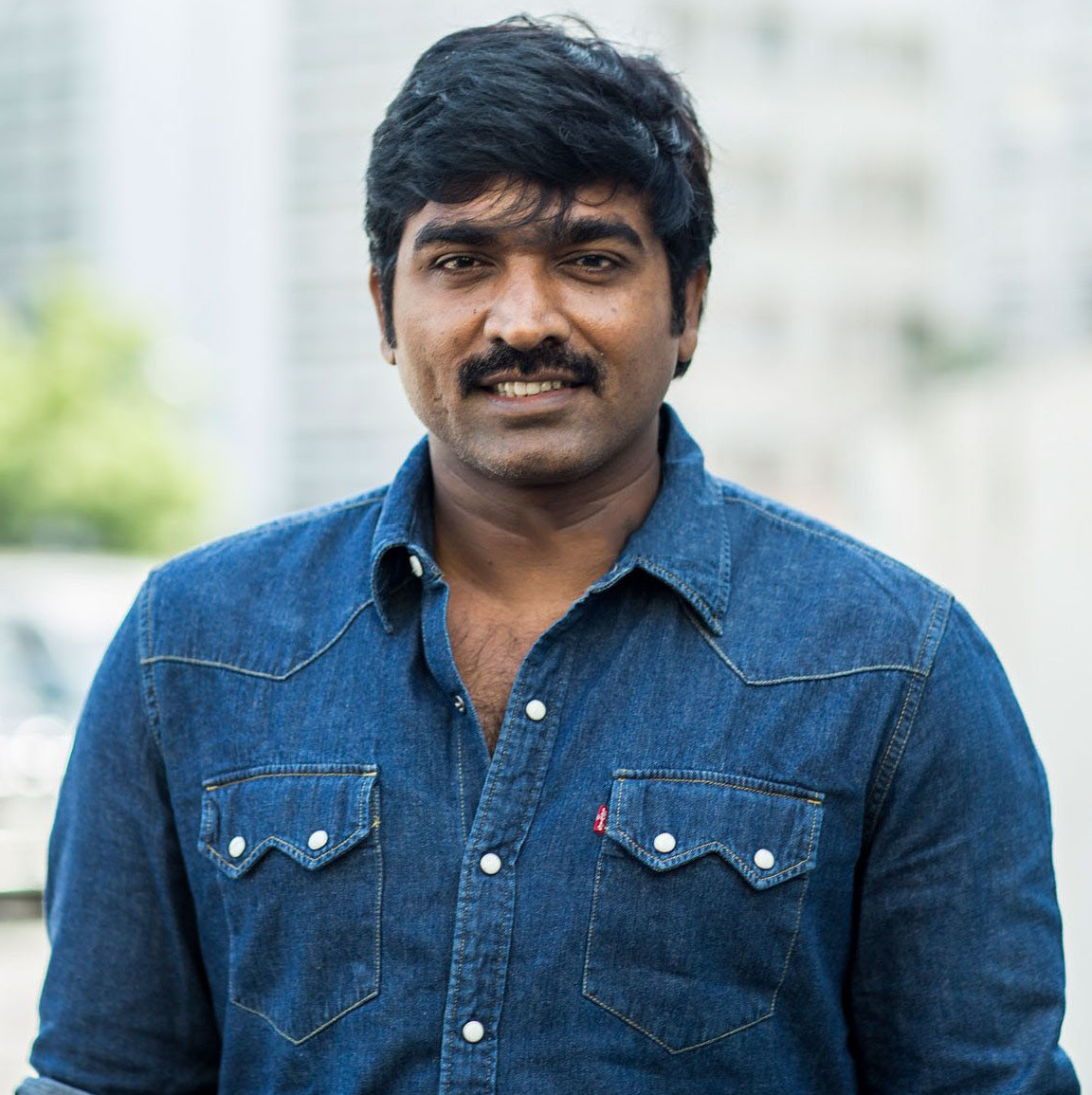
Critics praised the performances of Shahid Kapoor (left) and Vijay Sethupathi.

Saibal Chatterjee of NDTV wrote that "thanks to a gripping storyline, the uniformly-paced series sustains its momentum within the individual chapters and across all its eight parts", and praised the performances of Shahid Kapoor, Vijay Sethupathi and Kay Kay Menon. Shubhra Gupta of The Indian Express concluded that the "inimitable Vijay Sethupathi livens up show that is in service to its star Shahid Kapoor, not its plot". Anuj Kumar of The Hindu also compared it unfavourably to The Family Man, writing that the "socio-political commentary that was seamless in The Family Man gets repetitive and even jarring at times here". He also expressed displeasure with how "the writers have spent hours in explaining the business of counterfeit currency, but have left the nuts and bolts of the story loose", but found Kapoor and Sethupathi's performances to be "splendid".

Deepa Gahlot of Rediff.com was appreciative of the performances of Sethupathi and Menon; she found certain episodes to be "adrenaline-pumping" but found others "yawn-inducing". ThePrint's Nidhima Taneja termed it a "gripping crime thriller" and found Bhuvan Arora's to the "breakout performance" of the series. Shweta Keshri of India Today wrote that "Farzi is an intriguing watch, but with too much detailing, it tends to get exhausting in parts". She added that "Kapoor has knocked it out of the park this time", termed Sethupati "remarkable", and Menon "top class". Scroll.in's Nandini Ramnath opined that "the show’s strengths include a well-chosen cast, strong individual moments, and dialogue destined to endure as memes". She was particularly impressed by Pankaj Kumar's cinematography, which she said "includes several continuous takes to create momentum and one bravura – and hilarious – chase sequence set in a crippling Mumbai traffic jam".

Pratikshya Mishra of The Quint termed it a "sly, gripping thriller" and added that "the camerawork and editing work hand-in-hand to create a nearly mesmerising experience, mimicking the hypnotic nature of greed, fame, and power". Sowmya Rajendran found similarities between Farzi and The Family Man; she labelled it a "mostly engrossing crime drama" and found Kapoor "likeable as the anti-hero". Dishya Sharma of News18 found Farzi to be "binge-worthy" but not "as great as The Family Man"; she picked up the performances, cinematography and music as the series' highlights. Ronak Kotecha of The Times of India opined that Farzi "is a refreshing and intensely gripping scamster saga whose pros far outweigh its cons".

=== Audience viewership ===
According to the consulting firm Ormax Media, Farzi emerged as the most-watched Indian streaming series of all time, with a projected 37 million viewers, overtaking the record previously set by Rudra: The Edge of Darkness (2022).

=== Accolades ===
Year	Award ceremony	Category	Nominee / Work	Result	Ref.
2023	IWM Digital Awards	Most Popular Actress in a webseries	Raashii Khanna	Won	
2023	Filmfare OTT Awards	Best Drama Series	Farzi	Nominated	
2023	Filmfare OTT Awards	Best Director in a Drama Series	Raj & DK	Nominated	
2023	Filmfare OTT Awards	Best Actor in a Drama Series	Shahid Kapoor	Nominated	
2023	Filmfare OTT Awards	Best Supporting Actor in a Drama Series	Bhuvan Arora	Nominated	
2023	Filmfare OTT Awards	Best Original Story (Series)	Raj & DK	Nominated	
2023	Filmfare OTT Awards	Best Original Screenplay (Series)	Raj & DK, Sita Menon, Suman Kumar	Nominated	
2023	Filmfare OTT Awards	Best Production Design (Series)	Parichit Paralkar	Nominated	
2023	Filmfare OTT Awards	Best Editing (Series)	Sumeet Kotian	Nominated	
2023	Filmfare OTT Awards	Best Background Music (Series)	Ketan Sodha	Nominated	
2023	Filmfare OTT Awards	Best Original Soundtrack (Series)	Sachin-Jigar, Tanishk Bagchi, Raghav Meattle	Nominated	
