= Sumit Arora =

Indian writer, screenwriter and director

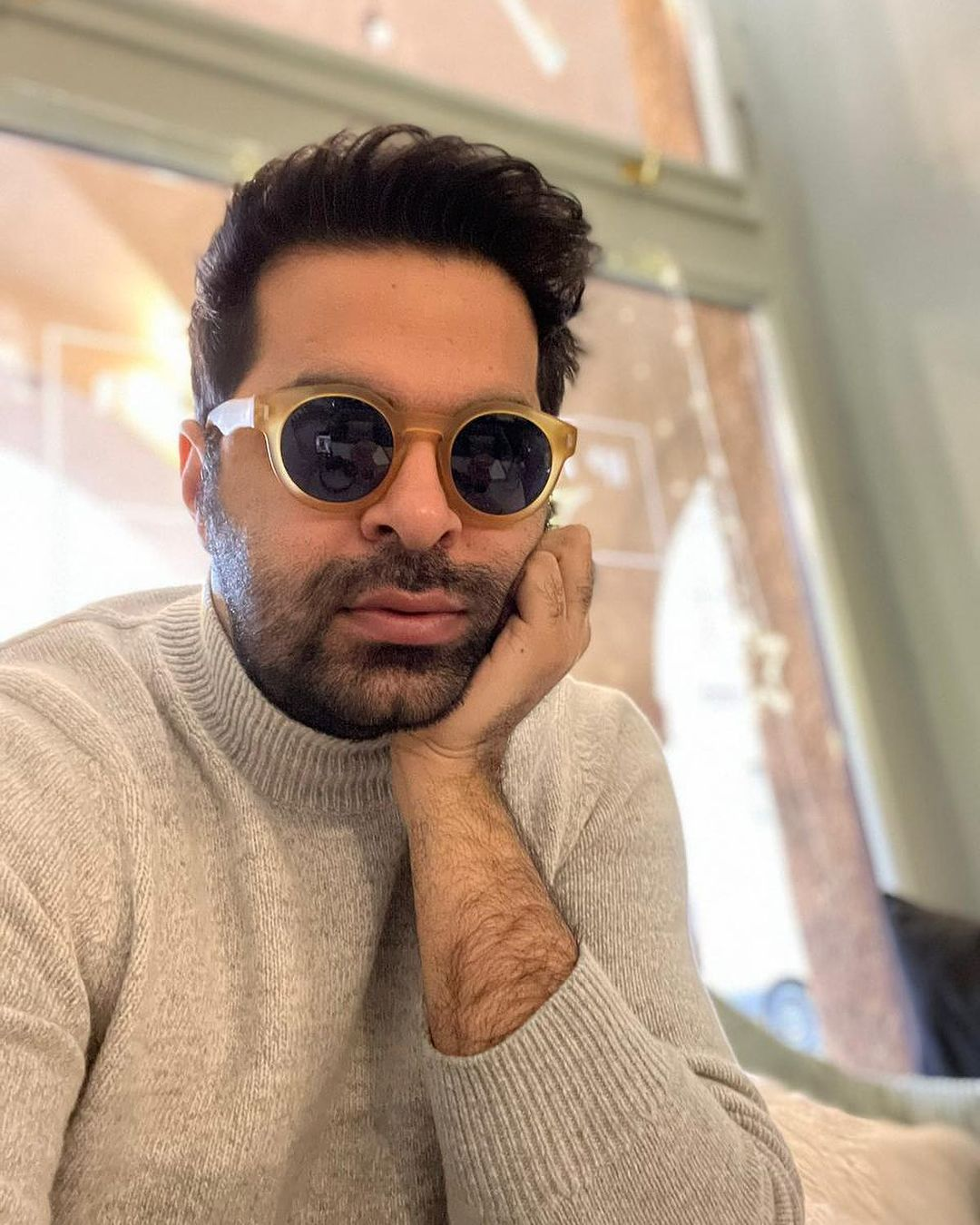
- Arora in 2023
- Born: Meerut
- Occupations: Writer; screenwriter
- Years active: 2007–present

Sumit Arora is an Indian writer, screenwriter and director who primarily works in Hindi films and television. He has written for various TV shows, including Dill Mill Gayye (season 2) and 24. He has also written dialogues for several films, such as Stree, 83 and Jawan. He won the Star Screen Awards and Zee Cine Awards for Best Dialogue for Stree.

== Career ==
Sumit Arora started his career with television and wrote dialogues for many TV shows like Chhoona Hai Aasmaan, Dill Mill Gayye (season 2). He then ventured into films and web series, writing for Selection Day, The Family Man, Dahaad and Guns & Gulaabs. He has also penned dialogues for films like Stree, Ginny Weds Sunny, 83 and Jawan.

== Filmography ==
=== Television ===
Year	Title	Notes	Ref.
2007	Chhoona Hai Aasmaan		
2009	Bhaskar Bharti		
2009-2010	Dill Mill Gayye		
2013-2016	24		
2013-2016	Sadda Haq		

=== Web series ===
Year	Title	Notes	Ref
2018	Selection Day		
2018	Little Things		
2019-2021	The Family Man		
2023	Dahaad		
2023	Guns & Gulaabs		
2024	Citadel: Honey Bunny		

=== Films ===
Year	Title	Notes	Ref.
2015	All Is Well		
2017	White Shirt		
2018	Stree		
2020	Ginny Weds Sunny		
2021	83		
2023	Jawan		
2024	Chandu Champion		
2024	Baby John		
2025	Deva		
2025	120 Bahadur		
2026	Border 2		

== Accolades ==
List of Sumit Arora awards and nominations
Year	Category	Nominated work	Result	Ref.
Filmfare Awards
2019	Best Dialogue	Stree	Nominated	
2022	Best Dialogue	83	Nominated	
2024	Best Dialogue	Jawan	Nominated	
Filmfare OTT Awards
2023	Best Dialogue	The Family Man	Won	
Star Screen Awards
2019	Best Dialogue	Stree	Won	
Zee Cine Awards
2019	Best Dialogue	Stree	Won	
