= Sri Venkateswara University College of Engineering =

College in Tirupati, India

Sri Venkateswara University College Of Engineering
- Motto: జ్ఞానం సమ్యగవేక్షణం (in Telugu) ज्ञानं सम्यगवेक्षणम् ( in Sanskrit)
- Motto in English: Wisdom lies in Correct Perspective
- Type: Education and research institution
- Established: August 10, 1959; 67 years ago
- Academic affiliations: Sri Venkateswara University
- Principal: G. Srinivasulu
- Location: Tirupati, Andhra Pradesh, India
- Campus: Urban
- Nickname: SVUCE
- Website: svuce.edu.in

The Sri Venkateswara University College of Engineering (abbreviated SVUCE), Tirupati is a Constituent and Autonomous College of Sri Venkateswara University. It is located in the Sri Venkateswara University campus at the foothills of Lord Sri Venkateswara Swamy in Tirupati, India. The college offers a four-year B.Tech degree program with a total intake of 396 students across six engineering departments, a two-year M.Tech degree program with nine specializations and an intake of 180 students, and Ph.D. programs in all engineering departments.

The admission into undergraduate programmes is through a state level common entrance test EAPCET. The admission into postgraduate programme is 70% of students through GATE or AP PGECET and 30% of Students through Self-finance Management Category .

== History ==
SVUCE, a constituent and Autonomous College of Sri Venkateswara University, Tirupati, was established in 1959 and started functioning from 10 August 1959.

The foundation stone for the college Main Building was laid on 13 October 1959 by Pandit Jawaharlal Nehru, the first Prime Minister of India. It was declared open on 21 November 1968 by Sri. K Brahmananda Reddy, the then Chief Minister of Andhra Pradesh.

From the year 1977–78, the names of BE and ME were changed as B.Tech. and M.Tech. The institution achieved autonomous status in 2005.

== Disciplines ==
Currently the college offers B.Tech. courses in:

- Civil Engineering (from 1959 to 1960)
- Electrical and Electronics Engineering (from 1959 to 1960)
- Mechanical Engineering (from 1959 to 1960)
- Electronics and Communication Engineering (from 1971 to 1972)
- Chemical Engineering (from 1977 to 1978)
- Computer Science and Engineering (from 1986 to 1987)

At first three conventional disciplines of Civil, Electrical and Mechanical Engineering were offered with an intake of 40 in each as part of Bachelor of Engineering (B.E) degree. Subsequently, new disciplines were introduced in tune with the emerging trends and needs - Electronics and Communication Engineering in 1971–72, Chemical Engineering in 1977-78 and Computer Science and Engineering in 1986–87.

Part-time degree course for diploma holders and serving engineers was run for a number of years from 1973-74 until recently in three conventional disciplines of Civil, Mechanical, Electrical and Electronics, Electronics and Communications.

Postgraduate courses (ME) in engineering branches were started in the year 1971–72 in Departments of Civil Engineering, Electrical and Electronics Engineering, Electronics and Communication Engineering. Subsequently, PG courses were introduced in Chemical Engineering and Computer Science and Engineering.

Each discipline admits a maximum of 60 students in the bachelor's stream and a maximum of 24 students in each of the postgraduate specializations per academic year.

== Principals ==
Sl.No.	Name	During	Sl.No.	Name	During
1.	Prof. G. Ramakrishnan	1959-77	16.	Prof. G. Ram Prasad	2002–02
2.	Prof. B. Mohan Rao	1977-78	17.	Prof. B. Subramanyam	2002-04
3.	Prof. K. Gopichand	1978-81	18.	Prof. N. C. Eswara Reddy	2004–06
4.	Prof. P. Subramanian	1981-82	19.	Prof. K. Ravindranath	2006-08
5.	Prof. C. Venkataramaiah	1982-83	20.	Prof. M. M. Naidu	2008–10
6.	Prof. P. Pratapa Mouli	1983-85	21.	Prof. M. Muralidhar	2010-11
7.	Prof. C. Raja Rao	1985-87	22.	Prof. A. Prabhakar	2011–12
8.	Prof. D. R. Raju	1987-90	23.	Prof. A. Ramakrishna Rao	2012-13
9.	Prof. T. Rangaswamy	1990-91	24.	Prof. J. Karthikeyan	2013–15
10.	Prof. K. L. Narayana	1991-93	25.	Prof. P. Mallikarjuna	2015-17
11.	Prof. M. Krishna Murthy	1993-95	26.	Prof. G. Padmanabhan	2017–18
12.	Prof. K. Ranganadha Babu	1995-97	27.	Prof. G. N. Pradeep Kumar	2018-19
13.	Prof. T. Krishna Parandhama	1997-99	28.	Prof. S. Narayana Reddy	2019–22
14.	Prof. B. Swamy	1999-2000	29.	Prof. R. V. S. Satyanarayana	2022–25
15.	Prof. D. Changal Raju	2000-02	30.	Prof. G. Srinivasulu	2025–present

== Alumni ==
=== Notable alumni ===
- Raj & DK, filmmaker duo

=== Alumni Association ===
The college alumni has presence all over the globe. The alumni association of SVUCE was started in 1965. It was formally registered in the year 2001.
