= White Shirt =

- Directed by: Sumit Arora
- Written by: Sumit Arora
- Produced by: Sumit Arora
- Starring: Kunal Kapoor; Kritika Kamra
- Cinematography: Surjodeep Ghosh
- Edited by: Nipun Gupta
- Music by: Advait Nemlekar
- Production company: Highway Films
- Distributed by: Royal Stag Barrel Select Large Short Films
- Release date: 20 February 2017
- Running time: 18 minutes
- Country: India
- Language: Hindi

White Shirt is a 2017 Indian Hindi-language drama short film written and directed by Sumit Arora. Produced under the banner of Highway Films, it stars Kunal Kapoor and Kritika Kamra. It was released on YouTube on 20 February 2017.

== Cast ==
- Kunal Kapoor as Aveek
- Kritika Kamra as Vani
- Vaibhav Raj Gupta as Vibhor

== Production ==
The film was announced in February 2017, starring Kunal Kapoor and Kritika Kamra. A special screening of the film was held at Mumbai on 20 February 2017.

== Reception ==
Surabhi Redkar of Koimoi.com gave the film 3/5 stars. A critic from Scroll.in reviewed the film.
