= Guns & Gulaabs =

Indian black comedy crime television series

- Genre: Black comedy Crime thriller
- Created by: Raj & DK
- Written by: Suman Kumar; Raj & DK; Hindi Dialogues: Sumit Arora
- Screenplay by: Suman Kumar; Raj & DK
- Directed by: Raj & DK
- Starring: Dulquer Salmaan; Rajkummar Rao; Adarsh Gourav; Gulshan Devaiah
- Music by: Aman Pant
- Country of origin: India
- Original language: Hindi
- No. of seasons: 1
- No. of episodes: 7

Production
- Executive producers: Dimpy Agrawal; Rajat Kanti Sarkar
- Producers: Raj & DK
- Production location: India
- Cinematography: Pankaj Kumar
- Editors: Sumeet Kotian; Manas Anuj Parekh
- Running time: 44–81 minutes
- Production companies: D2R Films; Netflix

Original release
- Network: Netflix
- Release: 18 August 2023 – present

Guns & Gulaabs is an Indian black comedy crime thriller streaming television series on Netflix, created and directed by Raj & DK. Produced under the banner D2R Films in collaboration with Netflix, the series stars Dulquer Salmaan, Rajkummar Rao, Adarsh Gourav, and Gulshan Devaiah.

The title Guns & Gulaabs was inspired by the American hard rock band Guns N' Roses. The series premiered on 18 August 2023 on Netflix. In December 2023, Netflix renewed the series for a second season.

== Premise ==
In the cartel-controlled town of Gulaabgunj, an opium deal entangles a city cop and a romantically troubled mechanic in a whirlwind of chaos, crime, and unexpected alliances.

== Cast ==
- Dulquer Salmaan as Arjun Varma IRS, a Central Bureau of Narcotics Officer
- Rajkummar Rao as "Paana" Tipu Tiger / Spanner Tipu
- Adarsh Gourav as Jugnu "Chhotu" Ganchi, Ganchi's son
- Gulshan Devaiah as "Chaar(4)-Cut" Atmaram, The main antagonist
- Sushil Kumar as Dheeraj
- Rajatava Dutta as Sukanto
- Goutam Sharma as Suneel, Tipu's friend
- Gourav Sharma as Aneel, Suneel's brother
- Satish Kaushik as Ganchi, Chhota's father
- Nilesh Divekar as Nabeed, Ganchi's rival
- TJ Bhanu Parvathimurthy as Chandralekha "Lekha"
- Pooja Gor as Madhu Varma, Arjun's wife
- Suhani Sethi as Jyotsna "Jo" Varma, Arjun and Madhu's daughter
- Shreya Dhanwanthary as Yamini
- Vipin Sharma as Mahendra
- Ashmith Kunder as Sambi
- Manuj Sharma as Bunty, Tipu's friend
- Sanchay Goswami as Nirmal
- Varun Badola as Pratap
- Jeetu Shastri as Mandir Pandit
- Krish Rao as Lalkrishna Panwar "Nannu"
- Tanishq Chaudhary as Gangram "Gangu"
- Araham Sawant as Ikhlaq
- Adrija Sinha as Mamta
- Kumar Saurabh as Madari Baba
- Vikrant Massey as Devdas

== Episodes ==
No.	Title	Directed by	Written by	Original release date
1	"Chapter 1: Har Insaan Mein Hai Shaitaan"	Raj & DK	Suman Kumar and Raj & DK	18 August 2023
The story is set in Gulaabganj, a fictional town where government-licensed opium is grown. The vast majority of opium flow is controlled by two rival gangs, led by Ganchi and Nabeed. Gangaram, a local student, witnesses Babu Tiger, the right-hand man of Ganchi, being murdered by a hired killer named Four-Cut Aatmaram. Ganchi strikes a deal with Sukanto to deliver a large quantity of opium by the end of the month. Tipu, Babu's son, is a mechanic who is disgusted by Babu's criminal ways. He rejects Ganchi's offer to join his gang. Tipu wants to impress his crush Chandralekha ("Lekha"), an English teacher at the school, by writing her a letter in English expressing his feelings. Since he cannot speak English, he hires Gangaram and his friends Nannu and Ikhlaq to write the letter. When Gangaram finds out that the letter is for Lekha, he sabotages it as he also has a crush on her. Lekha is outraged by the contents of the letter and berates Tipu. A new Narcotics officer, Arjun, arrives in Gulaabganj. The corrupt policeman Mishra explains to him the opium smuggling system and asks him to join in, but Arjun refuses. At home, Arjun hides a mysterious call from his wife Madhu and daughter Jyotsna ("Jo"). Two thugs working for Aatmaram come to Tipu's workshop to get their motorbike fixed but end up harassing him over his father's death (which was ordered by Nabeed). Already heartbroken by Lekha's rejection and driven into a fit of rage, Tipu murders them both with a spanner.
2	"Chapter 2: Everything I Do ... I Do It For You"	Raj & DK	Suman Kumar and Raj & DK	18 August 2023
Tipu and his friend Suneel get rid of one body but the other is found by Aatmaram's men. Arjun meets with Yamini, the mysterious caller, who blackmails him over some compromising photographs. After an altercation with middleman Dheeraj, Arjun manages to intercept the photos from reaching Madhu. Ganchi, who has never delivered such a large quantity of opium, meets with Arjun to bribe him, but Arjun remains steadfast. Tipu finds out that Gangaram sabotaged his letter and gets Nannu to write him a new letter. When he gives this new letter to Lekha, she acknowledges his feelings for her, but doesn't want to marry him as he is too simple and not ambitious enough. However, she is impressed that he killed two men with his bare hands, which makes Tipu uncomfortable. Arjun learns that all the large-scale opium farmers of the area work with the two gangs, and only small farmers work with the government. He calls his blackmailer Pratap, a disgraced IAS officer who is in jail due to Arjun's investigation, to set up a meeting. At home, Ganchi falls through a newly-constructed staircase and severely injures himself. Aatmaram and his men corner Tipu and Suneel; Tipu manages to escape but not before Aatmaram kills Suneel in front of his eyes.
3	"Chapter 3: Kasam Paida Karnewale Ki"	Raj & DK	Suman Kumar and Raj & DK	18 August 2023
Ganchi is in the ICU and in a coma; Ganchi's son Jugnu and his men attempt to keep this news under wraps. However, Aatmaram finds out and reports it to Nabeed. Seizing this opportunity, Nabeed starts raiding the farmers who supply to Ganchi. Tipu, distraught over Suneel's death, decides to leave town as he feels insignificant, but he changes his mind after seeing Aatmaram and realising that he is driven by a need to avenge Suneel. He joins the Ganchi gang and is assigned to protect Ganchi at the ICU. Arjun meets with Pratap, who outlines his plan to destroy Arjun's life and career the same way Arjun destroyed his. Arjun meets with Yamini, who admits she has feelings for him, to try and acquire negatives of the photos, but she refuses as she is loyal to Pratap. Gangaram, Nannu, and Ikhlaq draw an obscene sketch of Jo on a town wall after she constantly embarrasses them in class. Under pressure from Sukanto, Jugnu decides to rob the government farmers to generate additional opium. As news of Ganchi's coma spreads, the gang loses influence in the area. While trying to find out how the news leaked, Jugnu accidentally kills the ICU doctor. His fellow gang members congratulate him on his first murder, but he is disgusted and vomits at the sight of what he has done.
4	"Chapter 4: Deal Ya No Deal"	Raj & DK	Suman Kumar and Raj & DK	18 August 2023
Jugnu visits his friend Nirmal (implied to be a former lover), still shaken at having committed a murder. Jugnu wants to roll back the days to their time in college but Nirmal is reticent as he is now married. Mishra advises Jugnu to back out of the deal with Sukanto, but Jugnu brushes him off. Mishra then sets up a meeting between Sukanto and Nabeed as he does not believe Jugnu can deliver the opium. Jo, being harassed at school due to Gangaram's sketch, bonds with Nannu, not knowing he too was involved in the sketch. Developing feelings for her, decides to wash off the sketch. Meanwhile, Lekha is impressed by Tipu's newfound power as a Ganchi gang member. Jugnu and his men crash the Sukanto-Nabeel meeting. Sukanto suggests the two gangs work together as neither can deliver the opium individually, but both Jugnu and Nabeed refuse. Sukanto then threatens Jugnu with dire consequences should he fail to deliver the opium by the end of the month. Tipu and Bunty go to Sherpur (the neighbouring town that is Nabeed's base) to look for Aatmaram but instead are chased by Aatmaram's gang; they escape to Gulaabganj by the skin of their teeth. Arjun begins raiding the farms of both Ganchi and Nabeed farmers; unbeknownst to his team, he doesn't log the crops he has seized. Arjun then meets with Sukanto and promises to deliver the entire quantity of opium to him, as he controls the entire opium flow in the area. At the ICU, Tipu witnesses Ganchi wake up from his coma.
5	"Chapter 5: Do Dil Mil Rahe Hain"	Raj & DK	Suman Kumar and Raj & DK	18 August 2023
Arjun meets with Pratap and agrees to pay him a hefty amount of money to stop his blackmailing. At the ICU, the doctors inform Jugnu that Ganchi is recovering but it will take time for him to be fully cognizant. Jugnu is desperate to complete the deal prior to Ganchi fully waking up in order to prove himself to his father. He meets with Arjun to try and strike a deal with him, but Arjun once again refuses. Arjun's assistant Ramprasad begins to get suspicious of his boss after he finds out that Arjun isn't logging the crops seized in various raids. Despite bonding over an ice cream date with Tipu, Lekha asks him to keep their relationship a secret, which irks Tipu. Nannu and Jo grow closer after Jo realises that Nannu is the one who cleaned up the sketch; however this leads to conflict between Nannu and Gangaram. When Gangaram outs Nannu's involvement in the sketch, Jo refuses to talk to either of them. Jugnu's men begin raiding the government farmers; one of those farmers is Lekha's father who stands to lose his government licence. When Tipu finds out about this, he requests Jugnu to let go a small amount of opium so that Lekha's father can keep his farm, but Jugnu refuses and chides Tipu for mixing work and love. Meanwhile, Nabeed orders Aatmaram to kill Ganchi, leading to an attack on the ICU. In the resulting shootout, Tipu sneaks up on Aatmaram and shoots him through the pants, not injuring the hitman, but scaring him enough that he and his men retreat from the ICU.
6	"Chapter 6: Pyaar Chutiyapa Hai"	Raj & DK	Suman Kumar and Raj & DK	18 August 2023
Arjun recruits Ramprasad to his cause after explaining his philosophy that stealing from thieves is not a crime. Arjun finalises the date of the opium delivery with Sukanto but he is spotted by Tipu and Bunty. Jugnu finds out that Ganchi was ready to name Nabeed as his heir after failing to conceive a male child (until Jugnu came along); Jugnu wonders why Ganchi would not allow one of his daughters to run the business. Jugnu then meets with Nabeed to try to work together on the opium delivery but Nabeed only insults him. Tipu finds out that Arjun is storing unreported opium from the raids in a government processing factory. He plans to rob the factory to recover a small amount of opium for Lekha's father, but is easily caught. However, Arjun is moved by his story of love and decides to let him go. Arjun meets Yamini to tell her that he does not regret his actions and he will never see her again. Mishra informs Arjun that he knows what game the narcotics officer is playing and threatens him. After finding out that Gangaram is a neglected child of a drunkard single father, Lekha meets with him to encourage him to focus on studying. He apologises for acting out and reconciles with his friends. Aatmaram vows to kill Tipu with his own hands. When Tipu finds out about Jugnu's meeting with Nabeed, he assumes the two gangsters are working together. Upset that his boss would join forces with the man he holds responsible for Suneel's death, he and Bunty resolve to teach Jugnu a lesson.
7	"Chapter 7+8: Raat Baaki..."	Raj & DK	Suman Kumar and Raj & DK	18 August 2023
Arjun makes a deal with Mishra to move the opium to a warehouse in exchange for 50% of the profits; separately he asks Tipu to steal the opium from the warehouse and deliver it to Sukanto in the woods, in exchange for clearing Lekha's father's name. Aatmaram, tired of Nabeed's insults, kills him in his house. After leaving, he's hired by middleman Dheeraj (now left out of the Pratap-Arjun deal) to kidnap Jo. Nannu writes a rap song for Jo and begins reciting it to her, but they are both kidnapped by Aatmaram's men. Jugnu finds out about the relocation of the opium and arrives at the warehouse to take control. After a brief shootout, Jugnu kills Mishra but finds that the opium is missing; unknown to him, Nirmal is killed by a stray bullet. Tipu delivers the opium to the designated location but when Sukanto arrives there, he finds nothing. Meanwhile, Aatmaram tells Arjun to deliver the opium to him in order to free his daughter. Arjun steals the opium truck from the woods moments before Sukanto arrives. Enraged over Nirmal's death, Jugnu instigates a shootout with Sukanto's gang; he is the only survivor. Gangaram and Lekha arrive at Aatmaram's hideout to rescue Jo and Nannu but are captured by the hitman's goons. In the resulting chaos, Aatmaram is accidentally run over by Tipu, driving a van, seemingly killing him. Arjun arrives with the opium and rescues the children, killing Dheeraj in the process. Aatmaram revives and attacks Tipu, slicing him three times, but Tipu manages to shoot him with his father's gun before he can make the fourth cut. On the way to the hospital, Tipu seemingly dies in Lekha's arms after giving her the receipt that clears her father's name. Yamini gives Arjun the photo negatives, but implores him to do the right thing for Madhu, not just for his own guilt. He calls Pratap to tell him that their deal is off, and decides to return all the opium to the government. Aatmaram, left for dead, reaches for his knife. Jugnu arrives at the ICU dressed as a woman; after concluding that she can never be the son that her father wants her to be, she takes Ganchi off the ventilator and kills him. She resolves to do things her way going forward.

== Production ==
=== Development ===
The series was officially announced in January 2022 by Netflix media press release. The first look poster of lead cast Dulquer Salmaan and Rajkummar Rao was revealed in March 2022.

=== Filming ===
Principal photography commenced in early January 2022 in Dehradun and Mussoorie before the official announcement. Makers of the series revealed that it took almost 100 days for the shoot due to the third wave of COVID-19 in India. The series was officially wrapped up shooting in April 2022.

=== Marketing ===
Short announcement clip of the series was released by Netflix India YouTube Channel on 31 January 2022. Official trailer with a release date was announced on 2 August 2023.

== Release ==
The series was released on Netflix in Hindi and dubbed versions in Tamil, Telugu, Malayalam and Kannada.

== Reception ==
Shilajit Mitra of The Hindu wrote that while '90s nostalgia was expected from makers Raj and DK, it can test the patience of their most ardent fans.

== See also ==
- List of Netflix India Originals
