= Raj & DK =

Indian film-making duo

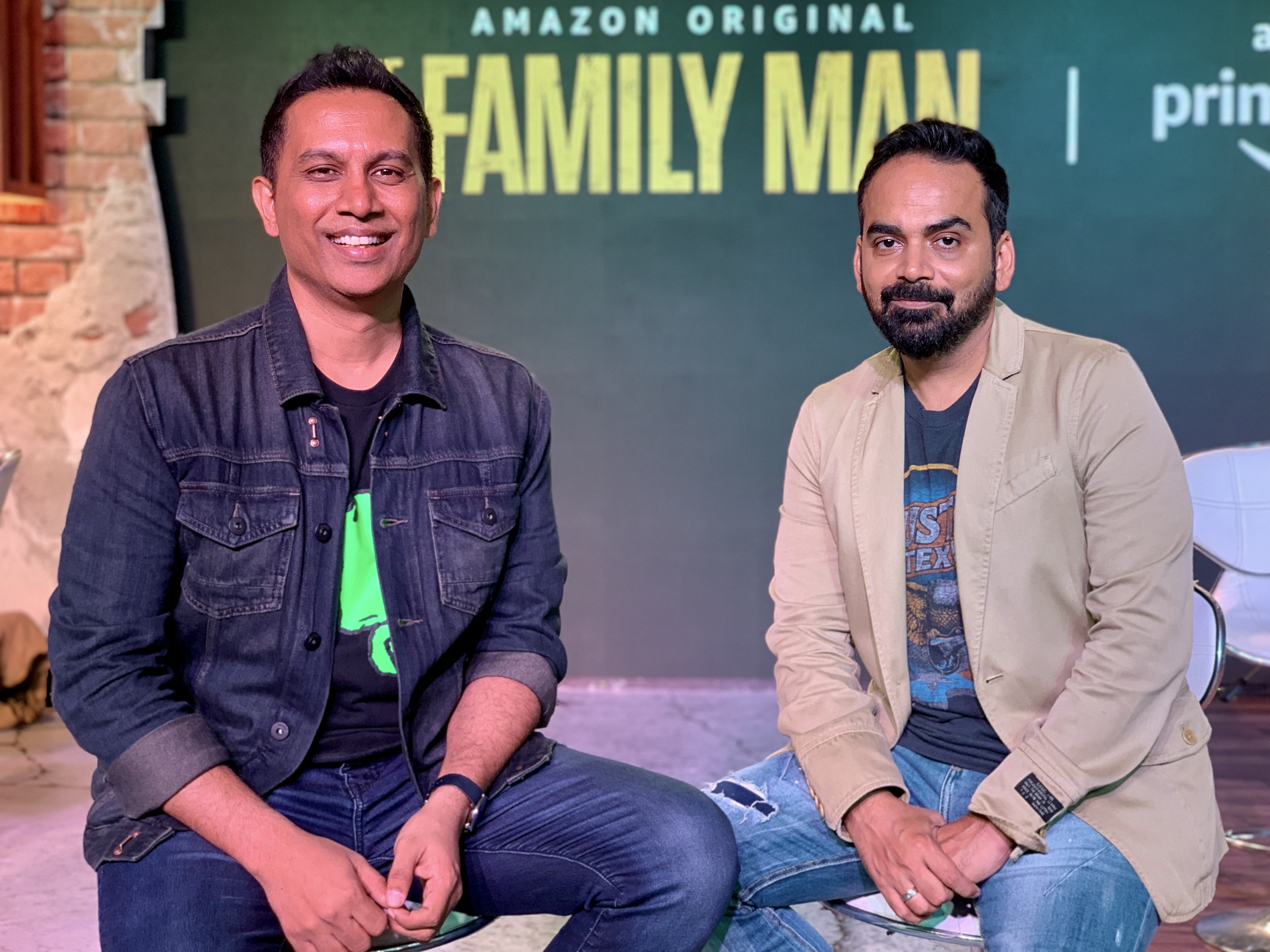
- Raj (left) and DK (right) in 2019
- Born: Raj Nidimoru; Tirupati, Andhra Pradesh, India Krishna Dasarakothapalli; Chittoor, Andhra Pradesh, India
- Education: Sri Venkateswara University College of Engineering
- Occupations: Directors; screenwriters; producers
- Years active: 2003–present
- Spouse(s): Raj Nidimoru: Shhyamali De (m. 2015, divorced) Samantha Ruth Prabhu (m. 2025) Krishna Dasarakothapalli: Anuradha Sharma (m. 2013)

Raj Nidimoru and Krishna Dasarakothapalli, collectively credited as Raj & DK, are an Indian filmmaker duo known for their work as writers, directors, and producers in Hindi cinema. They are noted for creating, directing, and producing the Hindi-language thriller series The Family Man (2019–present), Farzi (2023), and Citadel: Honey Bunny for Amazon Prime Video, as well as the Hindi-language crime comedy series Guns & Gulaabs (2023) for Netflix.

They have also directed the films 99 (2009), Shor in the City (2011), Go Goa Gone (2013), Happy Ending (2014) and A Gentleman (2017), and written Stree (2018).

== Early life ==
Raj Nidimoru and Krishna Dasarakothapalli (DK) were born and brought up in Tirupati and Chittoor, Andhra Pradesh, respectively, into Telugu families. They both graduated from SVU College of Engineering, where they met each other. After graduation, they emigrated to the United States to pursue a career in software engineering.

== Career ==
Raj & DK worked on the short Shaadi.com (2002) before working on the English-language feature film Flavors (2003) about Indian immigrants. Their first Hindi feature film, 99, was an original crime-comic-thriller-historical-fiction set in Mumbai and Delhi. The New York Times called it "funny, inventive, refreshing"; Box Office magazine (USA) acclaimed that the film "sets new standards in Hindi cinema!"; and a number of Indian publications gave it four star reviews. Rediff.com gave the film 4 stars and told the viewers that "they will leave the theater laughing and entertained". Indiatimes gave it 3.5 stars.

Their next, Shor in the City, was the acclaimed Hindi film of the year. It has received glowing reviews from across media publications. The film was made at a micro-budget, making it profitable even before the film's release. The film was also selected to various high-profile film festivals across the world. Nikhat Kazmi of The Times of India awarded it four stars out of five and stated "With a zany screenplay (Raj Nidimoru and Krishna DK), excellent cinematography by Tushar Kanti Ray and peppy music by Sachin-Jigar, Shor in the City is another breaking-norm film from Ekta Kapoor". Taran Adarsh of Bollywood Hungama gave it three and a half stars and wrote "Shor in the City belongs to one of those rare categories of movies with sensibilities that would not only entice the festival crowd and the cinema literate, but also lure the ardent moviegoer". Aniruddha Guha of the Daily News and Analysis gave it three stars and said "Shor in the City is the kind of reassuring film you yearn to watch amid, well, what 'Bollywood' has to offer every week. Also, it articulates something you have only probably thought before – 'Karma IS a bitch.'" Rajeev Masand of CNN-IBN awarded three and a half stars saying "A delicious mix of quirky humor, gruesome violence, and surprising sensitivity, Shor in the City works on the strength of its smart script and consistent performances from its ensemble cast". Rediff awarded the film four stars and said "Raj-Krishna's Shor in the City robotically registers itself in Indian cinema's history". Anupama Chopra of NDTV gave the movie four stars and wrote "Shor in the City is a terrific film. It’s surprising and disturbing and has a vein of rich, dark humor coursing through it". Shubhra Gupta of the Indian Express gave it a three star rating and commented "What makes Shor in the City an instant clutter-breaker is its darkly comic treatment. It makes you smile because its humour comes from within. It’s not grafted. And it’s got heart : we feel for the characters". Tushar Joshi of MiD DAY gave it a four star rating and wrote "Loaded with humor, sarcasm and wit. That truly is the beauty of the makers who succeed in arresting you with their tales. The spectacular climax is easily one of the best written in recent times". Karan Anshuman of Mumbai Mirror gave it a four star rating, saying "Three stories, eleven days, myriad layers, believable characters, fine performances, spirited direction, taut script, momentary explosions of originality".

Two years later, they came back with Go Goa Gone, which was a clutter-breaking film that introduced to India the first of its kind of a genre-bending film - a stoner/slacker comedy combined with horror and comedy. It became a cult film, especially among the younger audience.

They returned to production with the Telugu-language film D for Dopidi, ten years after their debut project. Their next two projects, Happy Ending and A Gentleman both received mixed reviews and failed commercially.

Their next production, Stree, released in 2018, to positive reviews to critics. Based on the urban legend Naale Baa, it starred Shraddha Kapoor and Rajkummar Rao, alongside Pankaj Tripathi, Aparshakti Khurana and Abhishek Banerjee. It was the first film to spawn a series of installments in the Maddock Horror Comedy Universe.

They made their television debut with the Amazon Prime Video series The Family Man in 2019. Featuring Manoj Bajpayee in the titular role as intelligence officer Srikant Tiwari, it was showcased at the Television Critics Association's summer press tour held in Los Angeles in July 2019, and was eventually premiered on Amazon Prime Video on 20 September 2019. It received acclaim from critics and audiences alike, praising the performance of the cast members, and writing and execution. The second season was scheduled to be aired on 12 February 2021 but was delayed, and finally released on 4 June 2021. The third season was released on 21 November 2025.

In 2021, they started subsidiary of their production company, D2R Indie to produce indie films. The first project produced under the banner was the 2021 Telugu film Cinema Bandi by debutant director Praveen Kandregula. It received positive response from critics and audience. LetsOTT cited the film as "an utterly delectable, charming, that rises a toast to the magic of cinema". Another reviewer writing to NTV, stated "Cinema Bandi toys with themes like hope and redemption. While the premise is heart-warming, the treatment could have been way better". Ramnath Nandini of Scroll.in wrote that "the [film] has a winning set-up, oodles of heart and snarky humour, which compensate for the unstructured and rambling narrative and simplistic approach". Gautaman Bhaskaran of News18 agave a rating of 2.5/5 and wrote that "Cinema Bandi has a very interesting message about how video cameras have afforded splendid opportunities for especially short moviemakers, the film appears rather raw". Hindustan Times's Haricharan Pudipeddi said that the film is rooted in reality and it brims with the kind of energy we rarely witness in mainstream cinema.

Sharing continuity with The Family Man, their series Farzi, starring Shahid Kapoor, Vijay Sethupathi, Kay Kay Menon, Raashii Khanna and Bhuvan Arora, premiered in 2023. It tells the story of a disillusioned artist who decides to make counterfeit money. The series received positive reviews, and emerged as the most-watched Indian streaming series.

They signed a multi-year deal with Netflix, under which they released the series Guns & Gulaabs, starring Dulquer Salmaan, Rajkummar Rao, Gulshan Devaiah, and Adarsh Gourav in 2023.

They signed for the Indian segment of Citadel by Russo brothers whose production began in 2022. Titled Citadel: Honey Bunny, it starred Varun Dhawan and Samantha Ruth Prabhu as the title characters. The series was released on 6 November 2024. On the review aggregator website Rotten Tomatoes, 80% of 15 critics' reviews were positive, with an average rating of 6.1/10.

== Filmography ==
=== Film ===
Year	Title	Functioned as			Language	Notes
Year	Title	Directors	Writers	Producers	Language	Notes
2003	Flavors	Yes	Yes	Yes	English	Also actors and playback singer for "Love Pyar Etc." (Raj only)
2009	99	Yes	Yes	No	Hindi	
2010	Inkosaari	No	Yes	No	Telugu	
2011	Shor In The City	Yes	Yes	No	Hindi	
2013	Go Goa Gone	Yes	Yes	No	Hindi	Also lyricists for "I Keel Ded Peepul"
2013	D for Dopidi	No	No	Yes	Telugu	
2014	Happy Ending	Yes	Yes	No	Hindi	
2017	A Gentleman	Yes	Yes	No	Hindi	
2018	Stree	No	Yes	Yes	Hindi	
2020	Unpaused	Yes	Yes	Yes	Hindi	Anthology film; Segment: "Glitch"
2021	Cinema Bandi	No	No	Yes	Telugu	
2026	Maa Inti Bangaaram	No	Raj	Raj	Telugu	

=== Television ===
Key
†	Denotes television productions that have not yet been released

Year	Title	Functioned as				Language	Platform	Notes
Year	Title	Creators	Directors	Writers	Producers	Language	Platform	Notes
2019–present	The Family Man	Yes	Yes	Yes	Yes	Hindi	Amazon Prime Video	Also actor (DK)
2023–present	Farzi	Yes	Yes	Yes	Yes	Hindi	Amazon Prime Video	
2023–present	Guns & Gulaabs	Yes	Yes	Yes	Yes	Hindi	Netflix	
2024	Citadel: Honey Bunny	No	Yes	Yes	Yes	Hindi	Amazon Prime Video	Executive Producers
TBA	Gulkanda Tales †	Yes	No	Yes	Yes	Hindi	Amazon Prime Video	
TBA	Rakt Brahmand: The Bloody Kingdom†	Yes	No	Yes	Yes	Hindi	Netflix	

=== Short films ===
Year	Title	Language	Ref.
2002	Shaadi.com	English	
2008	Shor	Hindi	

== Awards and honours ==
Film	Award	Category	Result	Ref
Stree	Star Screen Awards	Best Film	Won	
Stree	Zee ETC Bollywood Business Awards	Box Office Surprise of the Year	Won	
Stree	Zee ETC Bollywood Business Awards	100 Crore Club	Won	
The Family Man	Filmfare OTT Awards 2020	Best Director (Critics)	Won	
The Family Man	Filmfare OTT Awards 2020	Best Dialogue (Series)	Won	
The Family Man	Mid Day Hitlist Web Awards	Best Creator	Won	
The Family Man	Mid Day Hitlist Web Awards	Best Writing	Won	
The Family Man	Critics' Choice Shorts and Series Awards	Best Writing	Won	
The Family Man	Critics' Choice Shorts and Series Awards	Best Series (Drama)	Won	
The Family Man (Season 2)	IWM Digital Awards	Best Web Series	Won	
The Family Man (Season 2)	IWM Digital Awards	Best Dialogues in a Web Series	Won	
The Family Man (Season 2)	Mid Day Hitlist Web Awards	Best Season	Won	
The Family Man (Season 2)	Mid Day Hitlist Web Awards	Best Creator	Won	
Farzi	Critics' Choice Shorts and Series Awards	Best Web Series	Won	
Farzi	News18 Showsha Reel Awards	Best Director (OTT)	Won	
Farzi	Behindwoods Gold Icon Awards	Best Directors in an OTT Series	Won	
Guns & Gulaabs	Filmfare OTT Awards 2024	Best Series Critics'	Won	
Guns & Gulaabs	Filmfare OTT Awards 2024	Best Original Screenplay Series	Won	
Guns & Gulaabs	Yellowstone International Film Festival	Achievement in Direction (Series)	Won	
Guns & Gulaabs	SWA Awards	Best Screenplay – Web Comedy/Musical/Romance	Won	
Guns & Gulaabs	Behindwoods Gold Icon Awards	Best Directors in an OTT Series	Won	
Citadel: Honey Bunny	News18 Reels Showsha Awards	Best Director (Popular Choice)	Won	
Citadel: Honey Bunny	Talentrack Awards	Best Director (Drama)	Won	
Guns & Gulaabs Farzi The Family Man	Film Companion – Ormax Power List of Directors	Featured Directors	Won	
