= List of Hindi films of 2014 =

This is a list of Bollywood films that were released in 2014. PK became the highest-grossing Indian film ever at the time.

== Highest-grossing films ==
The highest-grossing films released in 2014, by worldwide gross, are as follows:

Highest-grossing films of 2014
| Rank | Title | Distributor | Worldwide gross | Ref |
|---|---|---|---|---|
| 1 | PK | UTV Motion Pictures; Vinod Chopra Films; Rajkumar Hirani Films | ₹769 crore (US$140 million) | (Note: PK worldwide gross: ₹854 crore (US$126 million): Domestic: ₹489 crore (US$80.2 million); Overseas: US$53.4 million (₹365 crore)) |
| 2 | Kick | UTV Motion Pictures; Nadiadwala Grandson Entertainment | ₹402 crore (US$66 million) | |
| 3 | Happy New Year | Yash Raj Films; Red Chillies Entertainment | ₹342 crore (US$66 million) | |
| 4 | Bang Bang! | Fox Star Studios | ₹333 crore (US$56 million) | |
| 5 | Singham Returns | Reliance Entertainment; Ajay Devgn FFilms; Rohit Shetty Productions | ₹215 crore (US$35 million) | |
| 6 | Jai Ho | Eros International; Sohail Khan Productions | ₹186 crore (US$30 million) | |
| 7 | Holiday: A Soldier Is Never Off Duty | Reliance Entertainment; Hari Om Entertainment; Cape of Good Films; Cinema Capital Venture Fund; Sunshine Pictures | ₹176.42 crore (US$29 million) | |
| 8 | 2 States | UTV Motion Pictures; Dharma Productions; Nadiadwala Grandson Entertainment | ₹172.99 crore (US$28 million) | |
| 9 | Ek Villain | Balaji Motion Pictures | ₹169.62 crore (US$18 million)(US$29 million) | |
| 10 | Gunday | Yash Raj Films | ₹130.91 crore (US$23 million) | |

== January – March ==
| Opening | | Title | Director | Cast | Genre | Studio | Source |
|---|---|---|---|---|---|---|---|
| J A N | 3 | Mr Joe B. Carvalho | Samir Tiwari | Arshad Warsi, Soha Ali Khan, Javed Jaffrey, Vijay Raaz | Comedy | | |
| J A N | 3 | 19th January | Sanjay Amar | Deepti Naval, K. K. Raina, Bidita Baig, Madhuri Bhatia | Drama | | |
| J A N | 3 | Sholay 3D | Ramesh Sippy | Dharmendra, Amitabh Bachchan, Hema Malini, Jaya Bhaduri, Sanjeev Kumar, Amjad Khan, A.K. Hangal | Action/Adventure | UTV Motion Pictures, Pen Studios, Ramesh Sippy Entertainment | |
| J A N | 10 | Dedh Ishqiya | Abhishek Chaubey | Naseeruddin Shah, Arshad Warsi, Madhuri Dixit, Huma Qureshi | Black comedy/Thriller | Shemaroo Entertainment, VB Pictures | |
| J A N | 10 | Yaariyan | Divya Khosla Kumar | Himansh Kohli, Shreyas Pardiwalla, Dev Sharma, Nicole Faria, Rakul Preet Singh | Romance | T-Series Films | |
| J A N | 17 | Karle Pyaar Karle | Rajesh Pandey | Shiv Darshan, Hasleen Kaur | Romance | | |
| J A N | 17 | Miss Lovely | Ashim Ahluwalia | Nawazuddin Siddiqui, Niharika Singh | Drama | | |
| J A N | 17 | Om-Dar-B-Dar | Kamal Swaroop | Aditya Lakhia, Manish Gupta, Anita Kanwar, Gopi Desai | Experimental | | |
| J A N | 17 | Paranthe Wali Gali | Sachin Gupta | Anuj Saxena, Neha Pawar, Mohinder Gujral, Vijayant Kohli, Himanshu Thakkar, Yuvraj Haral | Romantic comedy | | |
| J A N | 17 | Strings of Passion | Sanghamitra Chaudhari | Zeenat Aman, Indrani Haldar, Shubh Mukherjee, Rajesh Sharma | Drama | | |
| J A N | 24 | Jai Ho | Sohail Khan | Salman Khan, Daisy Shah, Tabu, Sana Khan, Danny Denzongpa, Mohnish Behl, Pulkit Samrat, Vatsal Sheth, Suniel Shetty, Genelia Deshmukh | Action – comedy | Eros International, Sohail Khan Productionz | |
| J A N | 31 | One by Two | Devika Bhagat | Abhay Deol, Preeti Desai, Rati Agnihotri, Jayant Kripalani, Darshan Jariwala, Lilette Dubey, Anish Trivedi | Romance/Comedy | Viacom18 Motion Pictures, Cynozure Networkz, IE Films | |
| F E B | 7 | Babloo Happy Hai | Nila Madhab Panda | Sahil Anand, Erica Fernandes, Preet Kamal, Sumit Suri, Amol Parashar, Reyhna Malhotra, Parvin Dabas, Anu Choudhury, Pooja Tawde, Khusbhoo Purohit, Mika Singh | Comedy | | |
| F E B | 7 | Hasee Toh Phasee | Vinil Mathew | Sidharth Malhotra, Parineeti Chopra, Adah Sharma | Romance/Comedy | Reliance Entertainment, Dharma Productions, Phantom Films | |
| F E B | 7 | Heartless | Shekhar Suman | Adhyayan Suman, Ariana Ayam, Om Puri, Deepti Naval, Madan Jain, Shekhar Suman | Thriller | | |
| F E B | 7 | Ya Rab | Hasnain Hyderabadwala | Manzar Sehbai, Ajaz Khan, Akhilendra Mishra, Raju Kher, Kishori Shahane, Vikram Singh | Drama/Social | | |
| F E B | 14 | Gunday | Ali Abbas Zafar | Ranveer Singh, Arjun Kapoor, Priyanka Chopra, Irrfan Khan, Pankaj Tripathi | Action | Yash Raj Films | |
| F E B | 14 | Kaho Na Kaho | Sanjay Niranjan | Sikandar, Roshni, Raja | Social | | |
| F E B | 21 | Darr @ the Mall | Pawan Kripalani | Jimmy Sheirgill, Nushrat Bharucha, Arif Zakaria, Asif Basra, Nivedita Bhattacharya | Horror | MSM Motion Pictures, Contiloe Entertainment | |
| F E B | 21 | Dee Saturday Night | Jay Prakash | Prashant Narayanan, Arif Zakaria, Aman Verma, Mahi Khanduri, Gaurav Dixit, Nazneen Patel | Drama | | |
| F E B | 21 | Gulabi Gang | Nishtha Jain | Sampat Pal Devi | Documentary | | |
| F E B | 21 | Highway | Imtiaz Ali | Randeep Hooda, Alia Bhatt | Drama/Romance | UTV Motion Pictures, Nadiadwala Grandson Entertainment, Window Seat Films | |
| F E B | 21 | Karar: The Deal | Sabir | Tarun Arora, Mahek Chahal, Jyothi Rana | Thriller | | |
| F E B | 21 | Pyar Ka Live Show | Shailendra Singh Rajput | Ishrat Ali, Rudraksh Pundhir, Rajni Mehta, Upasana Singh, Mushtaq Khan, Adi Irani, Shiva Rindan | Drama | | |
| F E B | 21 | The Dark Secrets Of Tonhi | Shiraz Henry | Natasha Sikka, J. Brandon Hill, Alex Peters, Smitha Siah, Priyanka Joshi | Drama/Action | | |
| F E B | 28 | Anuradha | Raju Mavani | Sachin Khedekar, Smita Jaykar, Disha Choudhary, Shagun Sharma, Rahul Jain, Manoj Joshi, Kishori Shahane, Hrishitaa Bhatt, Aakash Sharma, Raju Mavani, Ganesh Acharya, Manoj Tiwari, Prashant Upadhyay | Drama | | |
| F E B | 28 | Shaadi Ke Side Effects | Saket Chaudhary | Farhan Akhtar, Vidya Balan, Vir Das, Ram Kapoor, Gautami Kapoor, Purab Kohli, Rati Agnihotri | Romance/Comedy | Balaji Motion Pictures, Pritish Nandy Communications | |
M A R
| M A R | 4 | Akela The Alone | Abrar Qazi | Rizwan Qazi, Qasim Bilal, Adil Ahmed | Horror | | |
| M A R | 7 | Gulaab Gang | Soumik Sen | Madhuri Dixit, Juhi Chawla | Social/Action | | |
| M A R | 7 | Queen | Vikas Bahl | Kangana Ranaut, Rajkummar Rao, Lisa Haydon | Romance/Drama | Viacom18 Motion Pictures, Phantom Films | |
| M A R | 7 | Total Siyapaa | E Niwas | Ali Zafar, Yami Gautam, Sara Khan, Anupam Kher, Kiron Kher | Drama/Comedy | Reliance Entertainment, AKA Picture Company, Friday Filmworks | |
| M A R | 14 | Bewakoofiyaan | Nupur Asthana | Ayushmann Khurrana, Sonam Kapoor, Rishi Kapoor | Romance | Yash Raj Films | |
| M A R | 14 | Neighbours | Shyam Ramsay | Arbaaz Ali Khan, Roushika Reikhi, Shakti Kapoor, Gavie Chahal, Rufy Khan, Hritu Dudani, Kirti Vaidhya, Prince Sodhi, Sunny Singh | Horror | | |
| M A R | 14 | W | Tarun Madan Chopra | Danish Pandor, Raaj Singh Arora, Leslie Tripathy, Sonal Giani, Meer Ali, Abhey Attri | Thriller | | |
| M A R | 21 | Ankhon Dekhi | Rajat Kapoor | Sanjay Mishra, Rajat Kapoor, Samit Das, Brijendra Kala | Comedy | Mithya Talkies, Drishyam Films | |
| M A R | 21 | Gang of Ghosts | Satish Kaushik | Parambrata Chatterjee, Sharman Joshi, Mahie Gill, Anupam Kher, Meera Chopra, Saurabh Shukla, Chunky Pandey | Horror Comedy | | |
| M A R | 21 | Lakshmi | Nagesh Kukunoor | Monali Thakur, Satish Kaushik, Shefali Shetty, Ram Kapoor | Drama | Pen Studios, UV News Media and Communication, Kukunoor Movies | |
| M A R | 21 | Ragini MMS 2 | Bhushan Patel | Sunny Leone, Parvin Dabas, Divya Dutta | Horror/Adult | Balaji Motion Pictures, ALT Entertainment | |
| M A R | 28 | Dishkiyaoon | Sanamjit Talwar | Sunny Deol, Harman Baweja, Ayesha Khanna, Prashant Narayanan | Action | Eros International, Essential Sports & Media | |
| M A R | 28 | O Teri | Umesh Bist | Pulkit Samrat, Sarah-Jane Dias, Bilal Amrohi, Anupam Kher, Mandira Bedi, Vijay Raaz, Manoj Pahwa | Comedy | Reel Life Productions | |
| M A R | 28 | Station | Saad Khan | Sameer Kevin Roy, Kanika Batra, Vibhinta Verma, Siddhanth Sundar | Thriller | | |
| M A R | 28 | Youngistaan | Syed Ahmad Afzal | Jackky Bhagnani, Neha Sharma, Farooq Shaikh, Boman Irani | Drama | MSM Motion Pictures, Pooja Entertainment, PVR Pictures | |

== April – June ==
| Opening | | Title | Director | Cast | Genre | Studio | Source |
|---|---|---|---|---|---|---|---|
| A P R | 4 | Ebn-E-Batuta | Varun Middha | Omkar Das Manikpuri, Rajeev Verma, Dev Gohar, Satyendra Khare, Nazea Sayed, Neelam Singh | Sci-fi/Comedy | | |
| A P R | 4 | Honour Killing | Avtar Bhogal | Zara Sheikh, Sandeep Singh, Tom Alter, Gulshan Grover, Prem Chopra | Social | | |
| A P R | 4 | Jal | Girish Malik | Purab Kohli, Tannishtha Chatterjee, Kirti Kulhari, Yashpal Sharma | Drama/Fantasy | | |
| A P R | 4 | Main Tera Hero | David Dhawan | Varun Dhawan, Ileana D'Cruz, Nargis Fakhri, Abhimanyu Singh, Evelyn Sharma | Comedy | Balaji Motion Pictures | |
| A P R | 11 | Bhoothnath Returns | Nitesh Tiwari | Amitabh Bachchan, Parth Bhalerao, Boman Irani, Anurag Kashyap, Usha Jadhav | Fantasy/Children | T-Series Films, B.R. Studios | |
| A P R | 18 | 2 States | Abhishek Varman | Arjun Kapoor, Alia Bhatt, Amrita Singh, Ronit Roy | Romance | UTV Motion Pictures, Dharma Productions, Nadiadwala Grandson Entertainment | |
| A P R | 18 | Dekh Tamasha Dekh | Feroz Abbas Khan | Satish Kaushik, Ganesh Yadav | Comedy | Eros International, Bombay Local Pictures | |
| A P R | 18 | Lucky Kabootar | Shammi Chhabra | Ravi Kishan, Eijaz Khan, Kulraj Randhawa, Shraddha Das, Sanjay Mishra, Madhavi Sharma | Romance/Comedy | | |
| A P R | 25 | Kaanchi: The Unbreakable | Subhash Ghai | Mishti, Kartik Aaryan, Rishi Kapoor, Mithun Chakraborty | Musical/Drama | Mukta Arts | |
| A P R | 25 | Revolver Rani | Sai Kabir | Kangana Ranaut, Vir Das, Piyush Mishra, Zakir Hussain | Drama | Wave Cinemas, Moving Pictures, Crouching Tiger Motion Pictures | |
| A P R | 25 | Samrat & Co. | Kaushik Ghatak | Rajeev Khandelwal, Madalasa Sharma | Mystery/Thriller/Drama | | |
| M A Y | 2 | Purani Jeans | Tanushri Chattrji Bassu | Tanuj Virwani, Aditya Seal, Izabelle Leite, Sarika, Rati Agnihotri | Romance/Drama | Eros International, Next Gen Films | |
| M A Y | 2 | Kya Dilli Kya Lahore | Vijay Raaz | Vijay Raaz, Manu Rishi, Raj Zutshi, Vishwajeet Pradhan | Social | | |
| M A Y | 2 | Angry Young Man | Ramesh Rout | Ajay Sinh Rathod, Prachi Sinha | Action | | |
| M A Y | 2 | Kahin Hai Mera Pyar | Mahesh Vaijnath Doijode | Abhishek Sethiya, Sonia Mann, Sanjay Kapoor, Jackie Shroff | Romance | | |
| M A Y | 9 | Hawaa Hawaai | Amole Gupte | Partho Gupte, Saqib Saleem, Pragya Yadav | Drama | Fox Star Studios, Amole Gupte Cinema | |
| M A Y | 9 | Khwaabb | Zaid Ali Khan | Navdip Singh, Simer Motiani, Nafisa Ali, Bajrang Bali Singh | Romance/Drama | | |
| M A Y | 9 | Koyelaanchal | Ashu Trikha | Vinod Khanna, Suniel Shetty, Vipino | Action | | |
| M A Y | 9 | Manjunath | Sandeep A. Varma | Divya Dutta, Seema Biswas, Asif Basra, Yashpal Sharma | Drama | Viacom18 Motion Pictures, NFDC, Icomo | |
| M A Y | 9 | Mastram | Akhilesh Jaiswal | Rahul Bagga, Tara Alisha Berry | Adult | Bohra Bros, Jar Pictures | |
| M A Y | 9 | Yeh Hai Bakrapur | Janaki Vishwanathan | Anshuman Jha, Asif Basra, Amit Sial, Uttkarsh Majumdar, Faiz Mohammad, Suruchi Aulakh, Yaushika Verma, Shamim Khan | Comedy | | |
| M A Y | 16 | The Xposé | Ananth Narayan Mahadevan | Himesh Reshammiya, Sonali Raut, Yo Yo Honey Singh, Zoya Afroz, Irrfan Khan. Adil Hussain | Thriller | HR Musik | |
| M A Y | 16 | Children of War | Mrityunjay Devvrat | Farooq Shaikh, Victor Banerjee, Pawan Malhotra, Indraneil Sengupta | Drama | | |
| M A Y | 16 | M3 - Midsummer Midnight Mumbai | Braj Bhushan | Paras Chhabra, Sara Khan, M.A. Guddu, Pooja Thakur | Mystery | | |
| M A Y | 23 | Heropanti | Sabbir Khan | Tiger Shroff, Kriti Sanon & Prakash Raj | Romance/Action | UTV Motion Pictures, Nadiadwala Grandson Entertainment | |
| M A Y | 30 | CityLights | Hansal Mehta | Rajkummar Rao, Patralekha | Drama | Fox Star Studios, Vishesh Films | |
| M A Y | 30 | Kuku Mathur Ki Jhand Ho Gayi | Aman Sachdeva | Siddharth Gupta, Simran Kaur Mundi, Pallavi Batra | Comedy | Balaji Motion Pictures, ALT Entertainment, Getaway Pictures | |
| J U N | 6 | Filmistaan | Nitin Kakkar | Sharib Hashmi, Inaamulhaq, Kumud Mishra, Gopal Dutt | Comedy | UTV Spotboy, Satellite Pictures | |
| J U N | 6 | Holiday: A Soldier Is Never Off Duty | A.R. Murugadoss | Akshay Kumar, Sonakshi Sinha, Govinda | Action/Thriller | Reliance Entertainment, Hari Om Entertainment, Cape of Good Films, Cinema Capital Venture Fund, Sunshine Pictures | |
| J U N | 13 | Fugly | Kabir Sadanand | Jimmy Sheirgill, Mohit Marwah, Kiara Advani, Vijender Singh, Arfi Lamba | Comedy/Drama | Grazing Goat Pictures | |
| J U N | 13 | Machhli Jal Ki Rani Hai | Debaloy Dey | Bhanu Uday, Swara Bhaskar, Murali Sharma, Reema Debnath, Sakha Kalyani Deepraj Rana | Horror | | |
| J U N | 20 | Humshakals | Sajid Khan | Saif Ali Khan, Esha Gupta, Riteish Deshmukh, Bipasha Basu, Ram Kapoor, Tamannaah Bhatia | Comedy/Drama/Romance | Fox Star Studios, Pooja Entertainment | |
| J U N | 27 | Ek Villain | Mohit Suri | Sidharth Malhotra, Riteish Deshmukh, Shraddha Kapoor, Aamna Sharif | Romance/Thriller | Balaji Motion Pictures | |

== July – September ==
| Opening | | Title | Director | Cast | Genre | Studio | Source |
|---|---|---|---|---|---|---|---|
| J U L | 4 | Bobby Jasoos | Samar Shaikh | Vidya Balan, Ali Fazal, Arjan Bajwa, Anupriya Kapoor, Supriya Pathak, Tanvi Azmi | Comedy/Drama | Reliance Entertainment, Born Free Entertainment | |
| J U L | 4 | Lekar Hum Deewana Dil | Arif Ali | Armaan Jain, Deeksha Seth, Nikita Dutta | Romance/Comedy | Eros International, Illuminati Films, Maddock Films | |
| J U L | 11 | Humpty Sharma Ki Dulhania | Shashank Khaitan | Varun Dhawan, Alia Bhatt, Sidharth Shukla | Romance/Comedy | Reliance Entertainment, Dharma Productions | |
| J U L | 11 | Munna Mange Memsaab | Shareeph Mansuri Saranawala | Omkar Das Manikpuri, Razak Khan, Himani Shivpuri | | | |
| J U L | 18 | Hate Story 2 | Vishal Pandya | Surveen Chawla, Sushant Singh, Jay Bhanushali, Siddharth Kher, Rajesh Khera | Thriller | T-Series Films | |
| J U L | 18 | Bazaar-E-Husn | Ajay Mehra | Om Puri, Reshmi Ghosh, Yashpal Sharma, Jeet Goshwami | Drama | | |
| J U L | 18 | Riyasat | Ashok Tyagi | Rajesh Khanna, Aryaman Ramsay, Aryan Vaid, Raja Murad, Vishwajeet Pradhan | Drama/Action | | |
| J U L | 18 | Amit Sahni Ki List | Ajay Bhuyan | Vir Das, Vega Tamotia, Anindita Nayar, Kavi Shastri | Romance/Comedy | | |
| J U L | 18 | Pizza | Akshay Akkineni | Akshay Oberoi, Parvathy Omanakuttan, Dipannita Sharma | Horror | UTV Spotboy, Getaway Pictures | |
| J U L | 25 | Kick | Sajid Nadiadwala | Salman Khan, Jacqueline Fernandez, Nawazuddin Siddiqui, Randeep Hooda | Action/Comedy | UTV Motion Pictures, Nadiadwala Grandson Entertainment | |
| A U G | 8 | Entertainment | Sajid-Farhad | Akshay Kumar, Tamannaah Bhatia, Prakash Raj, Sonu Sood, Mithun Chakraborty | Comedy | Pen Studios, Tips Industries | |
| A U G | 15 | Singham Returns | Rohit Shetty | Ajay Devgn, Kareena Kapoor, Amol Gupte, Anupam Kher | Action | Reliance Entertainment, Ajay Devgn FFilms, Rohit Shetty Picturez | |
| A U G | 22 | Life is Beautiful! | Manoj Amarnani | Manoj Amarnani, Anokhi Dalvi, Nancy Brunetta, Parth Naik, Raj Zutshi | Romance | | |
| A U G | 22 | Mad About Dance | Saahil Prem | Saahil Prem, Amrit Maghera | Dance | | |
| A U G | 22 | Mardaani | Pradeep Sarkar | Rani Mukerji, Tahir Raj Bhasin, Jisshu Sengupta | Drama/Action | Yash Raj Films | |
| A U G | 22 | Mumbhai Connection | Atlanta Nagendra | Rafiq Batcha, Srinivas, Dick Mays, Alieesa Badresia | Comedy | | |
| A U G | 29 | Raja Natwarlal | Kunal Deshmukh | Emraan Hashmi, Humaima Malick, Paresh Rawal, Deepak Tijori, Kay Kay Menon | Thriller | UTV Motion Pictures | |
| S E P | 5 | Mary Kom | Omung Kumar | Priyanka Chopra, Minakkshi Kalitaa, Zachary Coffin | Drama | Viacom18 Motion Pictures, Bhansali Productions | |
| S E P | 12 | Creature | Vikram Bhatt | Bipasha Basu, Imran Abbas | Horror | T-Series Films | |
| S E P | 19 | Daawat-e-Ishq | Habib Faisal | Aditya Roy Kapur, Parineeti Chopra, Anupam Kher | Comedy/Drama | Yash Raj Films | |
| S E P | 19 | Khoobsurat | Shashanka Ghosh | Sonam Kapoor, Fawad Khan, Kiron Kher, Ratna Pathak, Aamir Raza Hussain | Romance/Comedy | Walt Disney Pictures, UTV Motion Pictures, Anil Kapoor Films Company | |
| S E P | 26 | 3 A.M. | Vishal Mahadkar | Rannvijay Singh, Anindita Nayar, Salil Acharya, Kavin Dave | Horror | | |
| S E P | 26 | Chaarfutiya Chhokare | Manish Harishankar | Soha Ali Khan, Seema Biswas, Zakir Hussain | Thriller | | |
| S E P | 26 | Desi Kattey | Anand Kumar | Suniel Shetty, Akhil Kapur, Jay Bhanushali, Sasha Agha, Tia Bajpai | Drama/Action | | |
| S E P | 26 | Meinu Ek Ladki Chaahiye | Abhishek Bindal | Raghuvir Yadav, Puru Chibber, Reecha Sinha, Zakir Hussain | Social satire | | |
| S E P | 26 | Balwinder Singh Famous Ho Gaya | Sunil Agnihotri | Mika Singh, Shaan, Gabriela Bertante | Comedy | | |

== October – December ==
| Opening | | Title | Director | Cast | Genre | Studio | Source |
|---|---|---|---|---|---|---|---|
| O C T | 2 | Bang Bang! | Siddharth Anand | Hrithik Roshan, Katrina Kaif, Jaaved Jaaferi, Jimmy Shergill, Danny Denzongpa | Action/Romance | Fox Star Studios | |
| O C T | 2 | Haider | Vishal Bhardwaj | Shahid Kapoor, Tabu, Kay Kay Menon, Shraddha Kapoor, Irrfan Khan | Drama | UTV Motion Pictures, VB Pictures | |
| O C T | 10 | Spark | V. K. Singh | Rajniesh Duggal, Mansha Bahl, Subhashree Ganguly | Drama | | |
| O C T | 10 | Jigariyaa | Raj Purohit | Harshvardhan Deo, Cherry Mardia, Virendra Saxena, K.K. Raina, Navni Parihar, Natasha Rastogi | Romance | | |
| O C T | 10 | Ekkees Toppon Ki Salaami | Ravindra Gautam | Anupam Kher, Neha Dhupia, Divyendu Sharma, Manu Rishi, Aditi Sharma | Political Satire | | |
| O C T | 10 | Tamanchey | Navneet Behal | Nikhil Dwivedi, Richa Chadda | Crime/Romance | | |
| O C T | 17 | Mumbai 125 KM | Hemant Madhukar | Veena Malik, Karanvir Bohra, Vedita Pratap Singh, Aparna Bajpai | Horror | | |
| O C T | 17 | Sonali Cable | Charudutt Acharya | Rhea Chakraborty, Ali Fazal, Raghav Juyal, Anupam Kher, Smita Jaykar | Comedy/Drama | | |
| O C T | 24 | Happy New Year | Farah Khan | Shah Rukh Khan, Deepika Padukone, Abhishek Bachchan, Sonu Sood, Boman Irani, Vivaan Shah, Jackie Shroff | Action/Comedy | Yash Raj Films, Red Chillies Entertainment | |
| O C T | 31 | Fireflies | Sabal Singh Sheikhawat | Rahul Khanna, Monica Dogra, Arjun Mathur, Shivani Ghai, Aadya Bedi | Drama | | |
| O C T | 31 | Roar: Tigers of the Sundarbans | Kamal Sadanah | Abhinav Shukla, Varinder Singh Ghuman, Himarsha Venkatsamy, Achint Kaur, Nora Fatehi | Drama/Action | | |
| O C T | 31 | Super Nani | Indra Kumar | Rekha, Sharman Joshi, Randhir Kapoor, Shweta Kumar | Drama | Maruti International | |
| N O V | 7 | Rang Rasiya | Ketan Mehta | Randeep Hooda, Nandana Sen, Paresh Rawal, Ashish Vidyarthi, Sachin Khedekar | Drama | | |
| N O V | 7 | A Decent Arrangement | Sarovar Banka | Shabana Azmi, Adam Laupus, Lethia Nall, Farid Currim, Shreya Sharma, Vikram Kapadia, Navniit Nisshan, Adhir Bhat | Drama | | |
| N O V | 7 | The Shaukeens | Abhishek Sharma | Akshay Kumar, Anupam Kher, Annu Kapoor, Lisa Haydon, Piyush Mishra | Comedy | Cine1 Studios, Cape of Good Films, Ashwin Varde Productions | |
| N O V | 14 | 6 – 5 = 2 | Bharat Jain | Prashanth Gupta, Niharica Raizada, Ashruth Jain, Gaurav Kothari, Disha Kapoor | Found footage / Horror | | |
| N O V | 14 | Kill Dil | Shaad Ali | Ranveer Singh, Parineeti Chopra, Ali Zafar, Govinda | Romance/Drama | Yash Raj Films | |
| N O V | 21 | Gollu Aur Pappu | Kabir Sadanand | Vir Das, Kunaal Roy Kapur, Shobhit Rana, Dimple Kapadia, Deepak Tijori | Comedy | Viacom18 Motion Pictures, Tipping Point Films, Frog Unlimited | |
| N O V | 21 | Happy Ending | Raj Nidimoru and Krishna DK | Saif Ali Khan, Ileana D'Cruz, Govinda, Ranvir Shorey, Kalki Koechlin | Romance/Comedy | Eros International, Illuminati Films, d2r Films | |
| N O V | 21 | Titoo MBA | Amit Vats | Nishant Dahiya, Pragya Jaiswal, Abhishek Kumar | Romance/Comedy | | |
| N O V | 28 | Hum Hai Teen Khurafaati (हम हैं तीन खुराफाती) | Rajeshwar Chauhan | Heena Panchal, Mausam Sharma, Pranshu Kaushal, Shrey Chhabra, Vrajesh Hirjee, Hemant Pandey, Razzak Khan, Brijendra Kala, Manoj Bakshi | Comedy | | |
| N O V | 28 | Ungli | Rensil D'Silva | Sanjay Dutt, Emraan Hashmi, Randeep Hooda, Kangana Ranaut, Neha Dhupia, Neil Bhoopalam, Angad Bedi, Arunoday Singh | Drama | Reliance Entertainment, Dharma Productions | |
| N O V | 28 | Zed Plus | Chandraprakash Dwivedi | Adil Hussain, Mona Singh, Mukesh Tiwari, Sanjay Mishra, Kulbhushan Kharbanda, Rahul Singh, Shivani Tanksale, K K Raina, Ekavali Khanna, Anil Rastogi | Drama | | |
| N O V | 28 | Zid | Vivek Agnihotri | Karanvir Sharma, Mannara Chopra, Shraddha Das | Erotica/Thriller | | |
| D E C | 5 | Action Jackson | Prabhu Deva | Ajay Devgn, Sonakshi Sinha, Yami Gautam, Manasvi Mamgai, Kunaal Roy Kapur | Comedy/Action | Eros International, Baba Arts | |
| D E C | 5 | Bhopal: A Prayer for Rain | Ravi Kumar | Martin Sheen, Mischa Barton, Rajpal Yadav, Tannishtha Chatterjee, Akhil Mishra, Fagun Thakrar, Joy Sengupta, Kal Penn, Martin Brambach, David Brooks, Vineet Kumar, Satish Kaushik, Vasanth Santosham, Manoj Joshi | Drama | Revolver Entertainment, Sahara Movie Studios, Rising Star Entertainment, GFM Films | |
| D E C | 5 | Mumbai Delhi Mumbai | Satish Rajwade | Shiv Panditt, Piaa Bajpai | Drama | Viacom18 Motion Pictures, Tipping Point Films | |
| D E C | 5 | Sulemani Keeda | Amit Masurkar | Naveen Kasturia, Mayank Tewari, Aditi Vasudev | Social/Drama | | |
| D E C | 12 | Badlapur Boys | Shailesh Verma | Shashank Udapurkar, Annu Kapoor, Anupam Maanav, Kishori Shahane, Aman Verma, Saranya Mohan | Sports | | |
| D E C | 12 | Life Mein Twist Hai | Dinesh Soni | Shyam Avtar Kedia | Drama/Romance | | |
| D E C | 12 | LUV...Phir Kabhie | Ajay Yadav | Saurabbh Roy, Arijita Roy, Meghna Patel, Narendra Bedi | Drama | | |
| D E C | 12 | Main Aur Mr. Riight | Adeeb Rais | Varun Khandelwal, Danny Saru, Shenaz Treasuryvala, Barun Sobti, Kavi Shastri, Maia Sethna, Anagha Mane, Neha Gosain | Comedy/Romance | | |
| D E C | 12 | Objection My God | Amit Khan | Makrand Deshpande, Sanjay Mishra, Rajesh Khattar, Zarina Wahab | Comedy | | |
| D E C | 12 | Room – The Mystery | Faizal Khan | Atif Jamil, Ibra Khan, Roselyn Dsouza, Eshu Gambhir, Himir Gandhi, Rohit Juneja, Shashwita Sharma | Suspense/Thriller | | |
| D E C | 19 | PK | Rajkumar Hirani | Aamir Khan, Anushka Sharma, Ranbir Kapoor, Parikshit Sahni, Sushant Singh Rajput, Sanjay Dutt, Boman Irani, Saurabh Shukla | Comedy/Drama | UTV Motion Pictures, Vinod Chopra Films, Rajkumar Hirani Films | |
| D E C | 26 | Ugly | Anurag Kashyap | Abir Goswami, Girish Kulkarni, Madhavi Singh, Ronit Roy, Anshikaa Shrivastava, Rahul Bhat, Tejaswini Kolhapure, Sandesh Jadhav | Thriller | DAR Motion Pictures, Phantom Films | |

== See also ==
- List of Bollywood films of 2015
- List of Bollywood films of 2013
- Finding Fanny – 2014 Indian English-language film
