= Anindita Nayar =

Indian actress

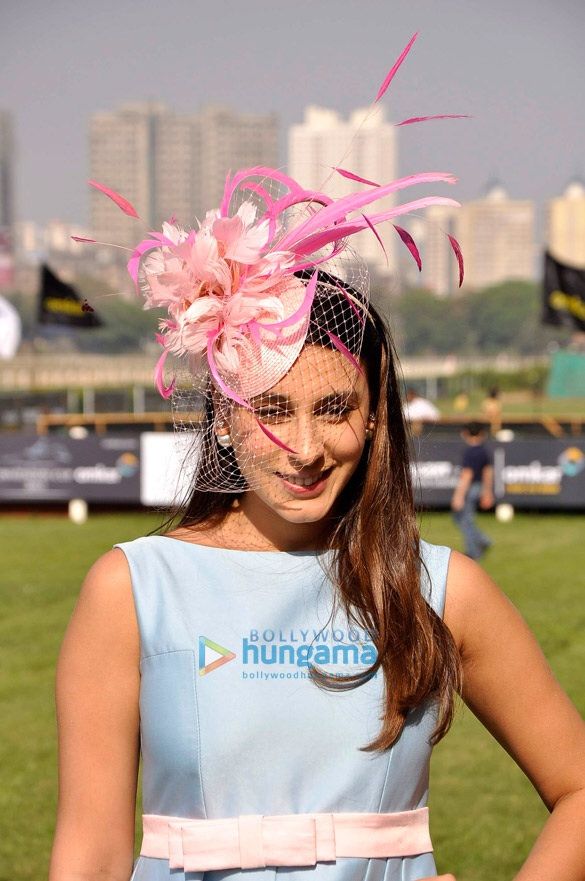
- Anindita Nayar at Wadia's Derby
- Born: 1 July 1988 (age 37); New Delhi, India
- Occupation: Film actress
- Years active: 2013 - 2016

Anindita Nayar born 1 July 1988, is an Indian actress. And she made her debut in Amit Sahni Ki List as the lead opposite Vir Das in 2014.

== Early life and career ==
Anindita collected her first ad commercial for Idea with the "No Idea - Get Idea" opposite Abhishek Bachchan. She also did commercials for Panasonic opposite Ranbir Kapoor and Garnier Color Naturals opposite Karisma Kapoor. She is in films like 3 AM by Vishal Mahadkar and Essel Vision Productions and will also be featured in Hasmukh Pighal Gaya, the lead opposite Vidya Balan, Amitabh Bachchan. She is also acting in P.O.W. - Bandi Yuddh Ke, directed by Nikkhil Advani, and is an official adaptation of the Israeli drama Prisoners of War (Homeland).

== Films ==
Year	Title	Role	Language	Notes
2014	Amit Sahni Ki List	Devika Dev-investment banker	Hindi	
2014	3: AM: The Hour of the Dead	Sara-lead role	Hindi	,
2015	Hasmukh Pighal Gaya		Hindi	
2016	P.O.W. - Bandi Yuddh Ke	Dr. Nandini Kapoor	Hindi; Urdu; Punjabi	Television series
