= Amrithadhare =

Amruthadhare
- Film poster
- Directed by: Nagathihalli Chandrashekhar
- Screenplay by: Nagathihalli Chandrashekhar
- Story by: Ramesh Aravind
- Produced by: Nagathihalli Chandrashekhar
- Starring: Dhyan; Ramya
- Cinematography: Krishnakumar
- Edited by: B. S. Kemparaju
- Music by: Mano Murthy
- Production company: Nagathihalli Cine Creations
- Release date: 7 October 2005
- Running time: 144 minutes
- Country: India
- Language: Kannada

Amruthadhare is a 2005 Indian Kannada-language romantic drama film directed and co-produced by Nagathihalli Chandrashekhar and written by actor Ramesh Aravind and Chandrashekhar. The film was released on 7 October 2005 starring Dhyan and Ramya in the lead roles. The music was composed by Mano Murthy. Amitabh Bachchan made a guest appearance as himself in the film. The film ran for twenty-five weeks, thereby becoming a silver jubilee film.

== Plot ==
Puru (Dhyan) and Amrutha (Ramya) are a married couple who behave like they are still lovers. Even though they like each other, they quarrel sometimes. Amrutha is a spendthrift and Puru is a miser. She wants a child to build a family, while he wants to build a house first. The film follows their trials and tribulations as they navigate the difficult world of marriage in the modern age. The film also has a strong social message and speaks about the emptiness of a large home without a large family inside it.

== Cast ==
- Dhyan as Puru (Purandara)
- Ramya as Amritha
- Amitabh Bachchan as Himself (guest appearance)
- Ganesh as Venky, Puru’s colleague
- Mandya Ramesh as Dr Subbu, Puru and Amritha’s friend
- Yashwant Sardeshpande as Naani, Puru and Amritha’s friend
- Bhavya as Amritha's mother
- Avinash as Puru's father
- Mukhyamantri Chandru as the police inspector
- Mandeep Roy as Seth
- Raju Ananthaswamy as Puru and Amritha’s friend
- Karibasavaiah

== Production ==
Amitabh Bachchan was brought in for a six minute guest role with the help of Dhyan, who worked in Hindi cinema under the stage name of Sameer Dattani.

== Music ==
The official soundtrack contains six songs. The music was composed by Mano Murthy and lyrics were by Nagathihalli Chandrashekhar. This became the 100th album to be released by Anand Audio.

Amrithadhare

Studio album by Mano Murthy
- Released: 2005
- Genre: Feature film soundtrack
- Length: 24:16
- Label: Anand Audio

Mano Murthy chronology
Preethi Prema Pranaya (2003)	Amrithadhare (2005)	Joke Falls (2005)

Kannada version

Song	Singer(s)	Duration
"Mane Katti Nodu"	Raju Ananthaswamy, Nanditha	04:43
"Nee Amrithadhare"	Harish Raghavendra, Supriya Acharya	04:40
"Giliyu Panjaradolila"	C. Ashwath	03:43
"Gelathi Gelathi"	Rajesh, Nanditha	02:17
"Suprabatha"	Ramprasad, Nanditha	04:08
"Huduga Huduga"	Chaitra. H. G.	04:45

Telugu version

1. "Adiga Adiga"- Avi
2. "Priyatama Priyatama" - Sam P. Keerthan, Srivardhini
3. "Illu Katti Choodu" - Illu Katti Choodu
4. "Naatho Matladu"- Amulya
5. "Ee Amrutha Varsham" - VV.Prasanna, Abhi

== Reception ==
A critic from Rediff.com wrote that "Outwardly, the language of Amrithdhare is regional. But it communicates ideas on love, loyalty, marriage and companionship with such passion". A critic from Sify wrote that "On the whole, this neatly made family entertainer is good in parts and is a welcome change from action films".

== Awards and nominations ==
2005–06 Karnataka State Film Awards

- Third Best Film
- Best Female Playback Singer — Chaitra H. G. ("Huduga Huduga")
- For Best Sound Recording — Johnson

53rd Filmfare Awards South

- Nominated, Best Film – Kannada
- Nominated, Best Director – Kannada — Nagathihalli Chandrashekhar
- Nominated, Best Actress – Kannada — Ramya
