= Raambo 2 =

- Theatrical release poster
- Directed by: Anil Kumar
- Written by: Anil Kumar
- Produced by: Atlanta Nagendra; Sharan
- Starring: Sharan; Ashika Ranganath; P. Ravishankar; Chikkanna; Kuri Prathap; Tabla Nani
- Cinematography: Sudhakar S. Raj
- Edited by: K. M. Prakash
- Music by: Arjun Janya
- Production companies: Laddoo Cinema House; De Arte Studios
- Release date: 18 May 2018
- Running time: 130 minutes
- Country: India
- Language: Kannada
- Budget: ₹7 crores
- Box office: ₹27 crores

Raambo 2 is a 2018 Indian Kannada-language action comedy drama film written and directed by Anil Kumar and produced by Atlanta Nagendra and Sharan. A sequel of Rambo (2012), the film features Sharan in the lead role, with Ashika Ranganath, Chikkanna, P. Ravishankar and Tabla Nani in the principal roles. A song sequence in the film has five of the leading ladies whom Sharan had paired with in his previous films. The film is co-funded by its technicians such as music director Arjun Janya, cinematographer Sudhakar S Raj, associate director Tharun Sudhir and editor K. M. Prakash. The film released across Karnataka on 18 May 2018.

Upon release, the film received positive reviews from critics. The movie was declared a blockbuster at box-office. The second half of the movie was reported to have been inspired by the 2015 Canadian movie Wrecker. This film was shot in various parts of North Karnataka region such as Gajendragad of Gadag district.

== Plot ==
In Goa, Krishna (Sharan) a happy go person and a devotee of lord ganesha is in pursuit for the love of his life, and asks for his lords blessing for the same, when he comes across that girl - Mayuri (Ashika Ranganth) a medical student and a party girl, they both meet up, have a good friendship and plan to go on an experimental long drive to decide on before falling for each other, and they meet up with DJ (Chikkanna) on the trip.

Enroute they are confronted by a strange car, who plays them into a FAST AND FURIOUS scenario, dragging the trio into dangerous and uncomfortable situations. Eventually the pathological stalker, kidnaps Mayuri, only to reveal that his target all along was krishna, and that mysterious man turns out to be a joker turned psycho[ p. Ravishankar], waiting to take revenge on krishna for causing the accident that disabled him and killed his young daughter.

krishna reveals, that day he had given his sports car for rent to two rich customers and saw them holding drinks, he then tracks down the real culprits and delivers them to joker, who then takes his revenge by causing the same accidents on them.

The movie concludes with a message to avoid drink and driving, or else the psychotic joker will pursue them.

post credits scene shows Krishna happily married to his love Mayuri, still satirically scared on his memories to that road trip, during his wedding night.

== Cast ==
- Sharan as Krishna/Krish
- Ashika Ranganath as Mayuri
- Chikkanna as Devanahalli Jagga (DJ)
- Tabla Nani as Krishna's Father
- Kuri Prathap as Krishna's friend
- Sadhu Kokila as Blind Man
- P. Ravishankar as Joker
- Jahangir as Jahangir Mirchikayi
- Vidyullekha Raman as Sheela
- Shivaraj (K.R.Pete) as a voice-over for Mooshika (Rat)
- Ganesh as a voice-over for Ganesh
- Aindrita Ray in a Special appearance for the song "Dum Maro Dum"

=== Cameo appearances in the song "Elli Kan Elli Kaneno" ===
- Sruthi Hariharan
- Shubha Poonja
- Mayuri Kyatari
- Sanchita Padukone
- Bhavana Rao

== Music ==
=== Soundtrack ===
Raambo 2

Soundtrack album by Arjun Janya
- Released: 2018
- Recorded: 2018
- Genre: Feature film soundtrack
- Label: Anand Audio
- Producer: Arjun Janya

Arjun Janya chronology
Dandupalya 3 (2018)	Raambo 2 (2018)	Naane Next CM (2018)

Arjun Janya has composed the songs for the film.

Track list
No.	Title	Lyrics	Singer(s)	Length
1.	"Dumm Maaro Dumm"	Muthu	Aditi Sagar	03:39
2.	"Yavva Yavva"	Nagendra Prasad	Vijay Prakash	03:29
3.	"Chuttu Chuttu"	Shivu Bergi	Ravindra Soragavi, Shamitha Malnad	04:18
4.	"Bitt Hogabeda"	Santhosh Naik; Ghouse Peer	Mehaboob Saab	05:03
5.	"Elli Kaan Ellikaaneno"	Yogaraj Bhat	Puneeth Rajkumar	04:23
6.	"Bellege Bellege"		Chikkanna

=== Chuttu Chuttu ===
Chuttu Chuttu song is the most viewed Kannada video song in YouTube. Chuttu Chuttu becomes the first Kannada song to cross 100 Million plus views. Chuttu Chuttu makes into Radio Mirchi top 20. In January 2020, it became the most viewed Kannada song on YouTube. Chuttu Chuttu First Kannada Song to Cross 100 Million Views On YouTube. Team of Raambo 2 celebrated the success of Chuttu Chuttu.

== Reception ==
=== Box office ===
Raambo 2 opened very well at box-office and grossed more than 9 crores within 2 weeks of its release. The film completed 50 days run in 100 theatres and 25 days run in 125 theatres. Raambo 2 got positive reviews and the film completed 100 days at the box office and it became a comeback hit for Sharan after a string of flops.

The film is slated to release in United States of America and Australia in June 2018. The movie had television premier on 16 September 2018 and had highest TRP rating as per BARC.

=== Accolades ===
Raambo 2 was nominated for 8th SIIMA awards in 7 Categories.

Ceremony	Category	Nominee	Result
8th South Indian International Movie Awards	Best Cinematographer	Sudhakar Raj	Nominated
8th South Indian International Movie Awards	Best Film	Atlanta Nagendra, Sharan	Nominated
8th South Indian International Movie Awards	Best Female Playback Singer	Shamitha Malnad	Nominated
8th South Indian International Movie Awards	Best Actor in Lead Role	Sharan	Nominated
8th South Indian International Movie Awards	Best Actress in Lead Role	Ashika Ranganath	Nominated
8th South Indian International Movie Awards	Best Comedian	Chikkanna	Nominated
8th South Indian International Movie Awards	Best Director	Anil Kumar	Nominated

Raambo 2 was nominated for Times Kannada Film Awards 2018.

Ceremony	Category	Nominee	Result
Times Kannada Film Awards 2018	Best Comedy Film	Atlanta Nagendra, Sharan	Won

Raambo 2 was selected in the popular films section at 11th Bengaluru International Film Festival (BIFFes) 2019.

Ceremony	Category	Nominee	Result
11th Bengaluru International Film Festival (BIFFes) 2019	Best Popular Film	Atlanta Nagendra, Sharan	Nominated

Raambo 2 was nominated for 66th Filmfare Awards South 2019.

Ceremony	Category	Nominee	Result
66th South Filmfare Awards 2019	Best Supporting Actor	Ravi Shankar	Nominated
66th South Filmfare Awards 2019	Best Supporting Actress	Ashika Ranganath	Nominated
66th South Filmfare Awards 2019	Best Female Singer	Aditi Sagar	Nominated
