= Deepa Prasad =

Indian actress

- Other name: Deepali
- Occupation: Actress
- Years active: 2001, 2004

Deepa Prasad, known by her stage name Deepali, is a former Indian actress known for her work in the Kannada films Nanna Preethiya Hudugi (2001) and Joke Falls (2004).

== Career ==
Nagathihalli Chandrasekhar was conducting walk-in interviews to find a heroine for Nanna Preethiya Hudugi (2001), a Kannada film that takes place in and around Michigan. Mano Murthy helped him find Deepa Prasad, who was studying her final year at the University of California, Berkeley majoring in Business Administration and minoring in premed. She went to India for a screen test before she was selected for the film, which was based on a book by Chandrashekar. She was rechristened Deepali for the film and made her debut alongside newcomer Dhyan. The film was shot during her vacation. A critic wrote that "Deepali acts with a lot of grace and confidence". The film was a silver jubilee and she won the People's Choice Favorite Actress — Kannada. She became popular for appearing in the film's song "Car Car". She started working as an auditing consultant.

She took a short break from acting before returning with Joke Falls (2004). Deepa accepted the film after she liked the story, which was inspired by Chup Chup Ke (2006). She was paired opposite Dilip Thadeshwar and shot her portions in two weeks. Regarding her role, a critic wrote that "Deepali’s role is restricted to request Dileep to teach her Botany" and another critic wrote that "Drawbacks of the film are Dilip and Dipali who are not at all fit for their roles". The film was also a success and ran for a hundred days.

== Personal life ==
She used to live in Chamarajpet and moved to the United States when she was two years old when her father came to pursue higher studies. She is currently CFO of a biotech company named Secretome Therapeutics.

== Filmography ==
Year	Film	Role	Notes
2001	Nanna Preethiya Hudugi	Chinnu	
2004	Joke Falls	Vasudha	
