= Atlanta Nagendra =

Indian screenwriter and director

- Born: Bangalore, Karnataka, India
- Education: Bangalore Institute of Technology, Bangalore, Karnataka
- Occupations: Film director, screenwriter and film producer
- Years active: 2004–present

Atlanta Nagendra is a screenwriter and director. His first film as a producer was Joke Falls. Nagendra is a software engineer turned film maker based in Atlanta, United States. Besides an engineering degree in computer-science, Nagendra has completed film making courses with emphasis on screenwriting, editing and direction.

== Early life and education ==
Nagendra was interested in film making while he was studying computer science engineering at Bangalore Institute of Technology, Bangalore University. He went to the US to continue his work as software engineer before venturing into film making.

== Film career ==
Nagendra started his career with Joke Falls, a Kannada comedy. The movie was successful and ran for 175 days. Nagendra's second movie is a Kannada comedy film titled Rambo. Nagendra has partnered with actor Sharan for this venture. Rambo was one of the top albums 2012 in CD sales and digital downloads. Rambo also makes it to the top 5 hits of 2012.

His third movie Mumbhai Connection is written and directed by him. It is a crime comedy thriller set and shot in Atlanta. Mumbhai Connection has been selected for eight film festivals (7th Atlanta Asian Film Festival Official Selection 2011 Atlanta, Georgia, US, Third World Indie Film Festival Official Selection 2011 San Jose California, US, 8th Dixie Film Festival Official Selection 2011 Macon, Georgia, US, 10th Urban Mediamakers Film Festival Official Selection 2011 Duluth, Georgia, US, 2nd Bronze Lens Film Festival Official Selection 2011 Atlanta, Georgia, US, 4th Bengaluru International Film Festival Official Selection 2011 Bengaluru, Karnataka, India, 7th Annual Macon Film Festival Official Selection 2012 Macon, Georgia, US, South Asian Film Festival Official Selection 2012) across the world. Mumbhai Connection has won several awards at the film festivals in the US. It was released in August 2014.

Nagendra's fourth movie is with Actor Sharan. Their early collaboration was for Rambo. They joined hands together after six years. The Movie was one of the biggest hits of 2018. It completed 100 days in several centres in Karnataka. The movie songs were massive hits on social media as well as on YouTube.

== Filmography ==
Year	Film	Language	Notes
2004	Joke Falls	Kannada	Writer, Producer
2012	Rambo	Kannada	Producer
2012	Drama	Kannada	Overseas distributor
2013	Googly	Kannada	Overseas distributor
2014	Victory	Kannada	Overseas distributor
2014	Gajakesari	Kannada	Overseas distributor
2014	Mumbhai Connection	Hindi	Story, Screenplay, Dialogues, Direction
2015	Mr. and Mrs. Ramachari	Kannada	Overseas distributor
2015	Rana Vikrama	Kannada	Overseas distributor
2015	Om	Kannada	Overseas distributor
2016	Actor	Kannada	Overseas distributor
2018	Raambo 2	Kannada	Producer
2025	Elumale	Kannada	Producer

== Awards and nominations ==
Ceremony	Category	Work	Nominee	Result
2nd South Indian International Movie Awards	Best Debutant Producer	Rambo	Atlanta Nagendra, Sharan	Nominated
8th South Indian International Movie Awards	Best Film	Raambo 2	Atlanta Nagendra, Sharan	Nominated
14th South Indian International Movie Awards	Best Film	Elumale	Atlanta Nagendra, Tharun Sudhir	Nominated
