= W (2014 film) =

2014 Hindi musical thriller film

- Theatrical poster
- Directed by: Tarun Madan Chopra
- Written by: Screenplay and Dialogues: Tarun Madan Chopra
- Story by: Daboo Malik
- Produced by: Subhash Sehgal; Shivang Sehgal
- Starring: Leeza Mangaldas; Leslie Tripathy; Sonal Giani; Raaj Singh Arora; Danish Pandor; Abhey Jit Attri; Meer Ali; Gagan Guru
- Cinematography: Bhavesh Rawal
- Edited by: Altaf Shaikh
- Music by: Daboo Malik
- Production company: Legacy Film Productions
- Release date: 14 March 2014
- Running time: 127 minutes
- Country: India
- Language: Hindi

W is a 2014 Indian Hindi-language musical thriller film about sexual violence against women in India. The film is directed by Tarun Madan Chopra, based on a script written by Daboo Sardar Malik and Tarun Madan Chopra. The movie starred Leeza Mangaldas, Leslie Tripathy, Sonal Giani, Raaj Singh Arora, Abhey Jit Attri and Danish Pandor. It had a limited release in theatres.

== Development ==
As part of the research to develop the film, director Tarun Madan Chopra and composer Daboo Malik interviewed Indian survivors of rape and their families, and they began writing the script in 2011. According to Chopra, "India has become infamous for violence against women. Through this film, we try to understand the reason behind the rise in such a crime." Malik told the Mumbai Mirror in 2014, "Many years ago, Tarun, who has a daughter, and I read an article detailing a heinous attack on a young girl. We couldn't fathom how human beings could stoop so low. It was something that stayed with us and acted as the germ for the film."

== Synopsis ==
Sandy (Leeza Mangaldas), Ruhi (Leslie Tripathy), and Manu (Sonal Giani) are three best friends who run W, an event management company that focuses on music events. While traveling to The Freedom Concert, an event that was supposed to be their big break, they come across a group of misogynistic men who don't like how modern and self-sufficient the three women are and end up raping them. Because the three men are of good social standing, the police are particularly unhelpful, and the women are traumatized by how they are treated afterwards. This prompts the three women to form the Vengeance Squad to take their own revenge against their rapists.

== Cast ==
- Leeza Mangaldas as Sandhya Singh a.k.a. Sandy
- Leslie Tripathy as Roohi Malik
- Sonal Giani as Manu
- Raaj Singh Arora as Abhay a.k.a. Bhaiji
- Danish Pandor as Dhruv
- Abhey Jit Attri as Chote
- Meer Ali
- Gagan Guru

== Production and release ==
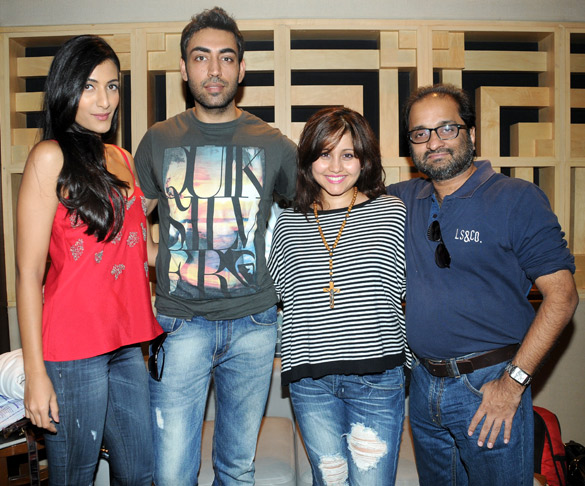
Leeza Mangaldas, Raj Arora, Apeksha Dandekar, Tarun Chopra at their maiden venture 'W'

In January 2013 it was confirmed that Leslie Tripathy would be performing in the film in an unspecified role, as would Leeza Mangaldas, Sonal Gyaani, Raj Arora, Daanish Pandor and Abhey Attri. Filming took place in Delhi. Before the film was released, a clip was shown in the context of a 2013 Australian Broadcasting Corporation report about the 2012 gang rape and murder of Jyoti Singh and people in India afterwards trying to "elevate the plight of women in India."

The film was released on 14 March 2014. According to Tarun Madan Chopra, who also produced the film and contributed Rs. 2.5 crore to its production, there were several challenges related to production and release, including raising funding and obtaining venues to show the film; Chopra told The Indian Express in 2014, "We did the rounds of 10 studios after making the film, but the sad part was that no one was willing to even watch the film! Eventually, we released W on our own. But with no buzz about the film, the collections were dismal and it ran for only a week in Mumbai."

== Reception ==
The Times of India gave the film 1.5 stars out of 5 stars, noting the intent of the film is to shift views so those who are raped consider themselves "fighters and survivors" instead of victims, with the reviewer also stating "There is no emotional conflict in the story that provokes you to think or get inspired. Situations are written to convenience the protagonists' quest for revenge. And they get it way too easy. The shallow treatment doesn't live up to the topic addressed." Business Insider described the film as "a stereotype revenge drama that works out all too smoothly" with "emotional pain and conflict" missing despite the "sensitive" subject matter.

== Music ==
The film's music is composed by Daboo Malik. His sons Amaal Mallik and Armaan Malik contributed to the soundtrack as singers, as well as Neha Bhasin and Apeksha Dandekar.

=== Track list ===
W

Soundtrack album by Daboo Malik
- Released: 7 March 2014
- Genre: Feature film soundtrack
- Length: 22:54
- Label: Sony Music
- Producer: Subhash Sehgal; Shivang Sehgal

No.	Title	Lyrics	Singer(s)	Length
1.	"Aana Nahi"	Daboo Malik	Amaal Mallik	4:55
2.	"Hum Hain Tum Ho"	Daboo Malik	Daboo Malik, Apeksha Dandekar	4:15
3.	"Wild Wild"	Daboo Malik	Daboo Malik, Amal Mallik, Armaan Malik	3:43
4.	"Tu Hawa"	Daboo Malik	Armaan Malik	5:36
5.	"Dil Ke Armaan (Women's Day Anthem)"	Daboo Malik	Daboo Malik, Neha Bhasin	4:25

== See also ==
- Red Brigade Trust
- 2012 Delhi gang rape and murder
