= Shirin Farhad Ki Toh Nikal Padi =

2012 Indian film by Bela Bhansali Sehgal

- Theatrical release poster
- Directed by: Bella Bhansali Segal
- Written by: Sanjay Leela Bhansali
- Based on: Farhad and Shirin by Nizami Ganjavi
- Produced by: Sanjay Leela Bhansali; Sunil A Lulla; Sandip Ssingh
- Starring: Farah Khan; Boman Irani; Kavin Dave; Shammi; Kurush Deboo; Daisy Irani
- Cinematography: Mahesh Aney
- Edited by: Bela Bhansali Sehgal; Rajesh G. Pandey
- Music by: Songs: Jeet Gannguli; Score: Adil–Prashant
- Distributed by: Bhansali Productions; Eros International
- Release date: 24 August 2012
- Running time: 122 minutes approx.
- Country: India
- Language: Hindi
- Box office: ₹94.8 million (US$1.0 million) (1 week domestic)

Shirin Farhad Ki Toh Nikal Padi (transl. Shirin and Farhad are in for it) is a 2012 Indian Hindi-language romantic comedy film directed by Bela Bhansali Sehgal, starring Farah Khan, Boman Irani, Kavin Dave, Shammi, Kurush Deboo and Daisy Irani. The film takes its inspiration from the Persian poem Farhad and Shirin by Nizami Ganjavi, itself based on a story found in the Shahnameh.

The movie marks director and choreographer Farah Khan's debut in acting.

== Plot ==
Farhad Pastakia (Boman Irani) has a dream job as a bra-and-panty salesman. Except that he is a 45-year-old Parsi bachelor still living with his overbearing mother and grandmother. But it's not like he's stopped trying. Desperate to get him married, Farhad's mother drags him to see women and even to embarrassing Parsi matrimony services.

In the midst of all the daily humdrum, Farhad meets the woman of his dreams: Shirin Fugawala (Farah Khan), who drops by his store. Shirin, who works at the Parsi Trust, hits it off with Farhad from the start. Everything seems to be perfect and Farhad gets ready to introduce Shirin to his mother. But mummy becomes the villain in their story when she discovers that Shirin is the devious Parsi Trust Secretary who got the illegal water tank in their home demolished. The water tank being the 'aakhri nishaani' of Farhad's late father doesn't help matters.

The ups and downs in Shirin-Farhad's relationship and how the two try to make it work is the rest of the journey.

== Cast ==
- Boman Irani as Farhad Pastakia / Homi Pastakia – Farhad's father (Double Role)
- Farah Khan as Shirin Fuggawala
- Kavin Dave
- Shammi as Mrs. Pastakia, Farhad's grandmother
- Kurush Deboo as Sorab, noisy quarrelsome neighbour of Shirin
- Daisy Irani as Nargis Pastakia, Farhad's mother
- Dinyar Contractor
- Rushad Rana as Hormuz
- Nauheed Cyrusi as Anahita
- Mahabanoo Modi Kotwal as Dhan Aunty
- Beroze as Farhad's aunt

== Soundtrack ==
Shirin Farhad Ki Toh Nikal Padi

Soundtrack album Shirin Farhad Ki Toh Nikal Padi by Jeet Gannguli
- Released: July 2012
- Recorded: 2012
- Genre: Feature film soundtrack
- Label: T-Series
- Producer: Sanjay Leela Bhansali

The album is composed by Jeet Gannguli.

No.	Title	Lyrics	Music	Singer(s)	Length
1.	"Khatti Meethi"	Amitabh Bhattacharya	Jeet Gannguli	Shreya Ghoshal
2.	"Ishq Mein Tere Bina"	Amitabh Bhattacharya	Jeet Gannguli	KK, Shreya Ghoshal
3.	"Kaafir Andhere"	Amitabh Bhattacharya	Jeet Gannguli	KK
4.	"Kukuduku"	Amitabh Bhattacharya	Jeet Gannguli	Mohit Chauhan
5.	"Shirin Farhad Ki Toh Nikal Padi Title Song"	Amitabh Bhattacharya	Jeet Gannguli	Neeraj Shridhar
6.	"Ramba Mein Samba"	Faraz Ali	Jeet Gannguli	Usha Uthup

== Release ==
Shirin Farhad Ki Toh Nikal Padi was released on 24 August 2012.

== Critical reception ==
Shirin Farhad Ki Toh Nikal Padi received positive to mixed critical reactions. Sukanya Verma of Rediff gave the movie 3.5/5, commenting that "Shirin Farhad Ki Toh Nikal Padi certainly makes for a welcome break from farcical exaggerations. What sets this delightful love story apart is that it is woven around two 40-plus Parsis, who neither face the hurdle of age nor community." Rajeev Masand of CNN-IBN gave the movie 3/5, concluding that "Shirin Farhad Ki Toh Nikal Padi is a charming film made with heart. Give it a chance, you won’t be disappointed." Aniruddha Guha of DNA India gave the movie 3/5, saying that "Shirin Farhad Ki Toh Nikal Padi demands little of you and delivers enough for you to not grudge spending time and money on it." Aakanksha Naval-Shetye of DNA India gave the movie 3/5, stating that "Shirin Farhad Ki Toh Nikal Padi is too sweet and too simple, but makes for a fun watch." Madhureeta Mukherjee of The Times of India gave the movie 3/5, concluding that "Shirin Farhad Ki Toh Nikal Padi is no epic love tale, but it's worth a watch for those who like their cinema as buttered as their bun maska." Saibal Chatterjee of NDTV gave the movie 2.5/5, commenting that "Shirin Farhad Ki To Nikal Padi is warm-hearted and generally watchable without being exhilarating." Taran Adarsh of Bollywood Hungama gave the movie 3.5/5, saying that "SHIRIN FARHAD KI TOH NIKAL PADI is a simple, unfussy and heartfelt movie that hits the right notes." Salman Khan praised the movie and told at least once it is watchable.

=== Box office ===
Shirin Farhad Ki Toh Nikal Padi had a good opening at the box office at 20%, collecting ₹16.0 million (US$170,000) in its first day. The movie collected ₹60 million (US$640,000) in its first weekend, collecting ₹19.0 million (US$200,000) in its second day and ₹25.0 million (US$270,000) in its third day. The film collected ₹94.8 million (US$1.0 million) nett in week one.
