= Leeza Mangaldas =

Indian podcaster and sex educator

- Born: Bangalore, Karnataka, India
- Occupations: Sex educator; sports reporter; podcaster
- Years active: 2013 – present
- Known for: Sex education

Leeza Mangaldas is an Indian sex educator and sports reporter. Her work focuses on female sexuality. She authored the 2022 book The Sex Book: A Joyful Journey of Self Discovery. Mangaldas has also worked as podcaster and occasional actress.

== Early life and education ==
Mangaldas was born in Bangalore, India. Her father is an architect and her mother is an interior designer and photographer. She grew up in Goa and attended high school in Kodaikanal. She studied English literature and visual art at Columbia University in New York, including in classes taught by Gauri Viswanathan, and graduated in 2011. After graduation, she moved to Mumbai.

== Career ==
While based in Mumbai, Mangaldas worked as an actress and was a co-founder of Evoke India, an organization curating speaker events. She had a lead role in the 2014 film W, about sexual violence against women in India. She also wrote a 2013 opinion article noted by The Indian Express to address themes in the film about shame and self-blame by survivors.

While working as a newscaster, and with experience as a reporter that included the Indian Super League, Mangaldas began independently posting sex education videos in 2017 on YouTube in English to help address what she felt was "a lack of easily accessible information and non-judgemental platforms to share questions and experiences, and obtain facts and resources pertaining to sex, sexuality, gender, sexual health, relationships, and the body."

After success creating content on YouTube and Instagram, this became her full-time occupation in 2018. During the COVID-19 pandemic in India, she also began creating videos in Hindi. In 2021, she began the podcast Love Matters, produced by The Indian Express and Deutsche Welle. In December 2021, she began the Hindi sex education podcast The Sex Podcast with Leeza Mangaldas on Spotify. In 2023, Meta, the company operating Instagram, restricted several Indian sex education content creators' accounts—including that of Mangaldas, who then deleted some of her content to avoid restrictions after an unsuccessful appeal.

In 2022 Mangaldas founded a sexual wellness brand called Leezu's which sells massagers and lubricants.

Mangaldas is a first-cohort Pleasure Fellow with The Pleasure Project, an international education and advocacy organization that has worked alongside the World Health Organization to make a case for pleasure-based sexual health.

=== The Sex Book ===
In October 2022, Mangaldas published her first book The Sex Book: A Joyful Journey of Self-Discovery with Harper Collins, and released an audio version on Audible. Scroll.in described the book as "scientifically oriented" and The Hindu described the book as "an invaluable sex-education manual that helps readers navigate and celebrate their bodies, identities and relationships." According to Vogue India, "Far from the grim scientific jargon and convoluted infographics of a biology textbook, The Sex Book is a breezy read. Mangaldas is like a good friend [...] No question is too stupid, no concern too small."

== Honors and awards ==
- Hindustan Times HT Brunch Social Media Star of The Week, 13 March 2021
- GQ India 25 Most Influential Young Indians 2020-21
- Cosmopolitan India Blogger Awards 2021-22: Sexual Health Influencer of the Year
- GQ India 30 Most Influential Young Indians of 2022
- 2022 Spotify AmplifiHer initiative
- Rolling Stone India Women in Creativity list for 2023
- Femina Fab 40 for 2023 list
