= Elumale =

Indian Kannada-language romantic thriller film

- Theatrical release poster
- Directed by: Punit Rangaswamy
- Written by: Punit Rangaswamy
- Produced by: Tharun Sudhir; Atlanta Nagendra
- Starring: Raanna; Priyanka Achar; Jagapathi Babu; Kishore; T. S. Nagabharana
- Cinematography: Advaitha Gurumurthy
- Edited by: K. M. Prakash
- Music by: D. Imman
- Production company: Tharun Sudhir Kreatiiivez De Arte Studios
- Release date: 5 September 2025
- Running time: 133 minutes
- Country: India
- Language: Kannada

Elumale (transl. Seven mountains) is a 2025 Indian Kannada-language romantic thriller film written and directed by debutant Punit Rangaswamy. It was produced by Tharun Sudhir and Atlanta Nagendra under the banners Tharun Sudhir Kreatiiivez and De Arte Studios. The film stars Raanna and Priyanka Achar in the lead roles, with Jagapathi Babu, Kishore and T. S. Nagabharana appearing in supporting roles. The film was released theatrically on 5 September 2025.

Since the film is set in across several states, it includes dialogues in Kannada, Tamil, English and Telugu languages. The plot revolves around a young girl who has eloped on the night of her marriage, and plans on meeting her boyfriend on Male Mahadeshwara Hills. However, it is also the night that Operation Cocoon is launched to capture the forest brigand Veerappan. The film was commercially successful at the box office. It also received positive reviews from critics upon release. Raanna's performance received praise. The Hollywood Reporter India included him in one of the top five performances in Kannada cinema for 2025.

== Plot ==
Set in the borderlands between Karnataka and Tamil Nadu, the film follows Harish, a cab driver from Chamarajanagar, and Revathi, a wealthy young woman from Salem, whose cross-border romance becomes entangled with law enforcement, smugglers and larger political undercurrents. As the lovers attempt to reunite their relationship, a series of incidents complicate their plans and push the narrative towards a tense, thriller climax.

== Cast ==
- Raanna as Harish
- Priyanka Achar as Revathi
- Jagapathi Babu as Vinay Kumar, IPS
- Kishore as Inspector P. Venkatesh Nayak
- T. S. Nagabharana as Head Constable Madevappa
- Sardar Sathya as Karnan
- Jagappa as Constable Manteswamy
- Rakesh Maiya
- Yogi Ram as Revathi's brother

== Production ==
Elumale marked the directorial debut of lyricist-turned-director Punit Rangaswamy. The project was produced by Tharun Kishore Sudhir (under Tharun Sudhir Kreatiiivez) with Atlanta Nagendra as a co-producer; De Arte Studios is listed as a production partner. Principal photography and location work emphasize the film's borderland setting; interviews and production write-ups note the film's multilingual elements and period details used to evoke the story's milieu.

== Music ==
Elumale

Soundtrack album by D Imman
- Genre: Feature film soundtrack
- Length: 20:13
- Label: Anand Audio

The film's soundtrack and background score were composed by D. Imman.

No.	Title	Lyrics	Singer(s)	Length
1.	"Yaavaaga Yaavaaga"	Nagarjun Sharma	Sid Sriram	4:38
2.	"Kaapaado Dyavre"	Nagarjun Sharma	Mangli	3:58
3.	"Aanumale Jenumale"	Punit Rangaswamy	V M Mahalingam	4:32
4.	"Preethi Mundhe Bere Ella Chikkadu"	Nagarjun Sharma	Jithinraj	1:20
Total length:				20:13

== Release and reception ==
Elumale opened in theatres on 5 September 2025. Actor Sudeep praised the film's craft, saying it is "worth watching". A film tutor at FTTI, Pune mentioned that, ‘Elumale’ is an interesting demonstration of how a good screenplay can turn a simple story into an intense experience.

Critical response was positive, with reviewers praising the film's blend of romance and thriller elements, performances and technical craft.

A critic from Deccan Herald gave 4 stars and wrote, "It may not be a one-of-a-kind experience, but the cinematic experience is definitely worth your time". The Times of India rated the film 3.5/5 stars and wrote, "With strong performances, period authenticity, and gripping suspense, it’s a must-watch for fans of romance and thrillers alike". The News Minute wrote, "Elumale is a self-aware exercise that knows exactly what it wants to communicate. It’s a film made with a keen eye, as well as the intent to enthral audiences without being formulaic". A critic from Cinema Express wrote, "The film captures the raw, haunting romance of Harisha and Revathi, while delivering a pulse-pounding thriller that tests courage and destiny in every moment. It demands attention, provokes emotion, and leaves you marvelling at the power of love caught in extraordinary circumstances". A critic from The Hollywood Reporter India called the film "a breath of fresh air in a genre that often uses intercaste love to tell stories of bloodshed and brutality". A critic from India Today rated the film 3.5/5 stars and wrote, "Elumale is a good watch and is highly recommended for thriller lovers. The film does have some flaws and hints of dated or old-school narration, but these are digestible as the thriller elements and performances impress". A critic from Kannada Screens wrote, "‘Elumale’ is a well-crafted romantic thriller". A critic from OTTplay rated the film 3/5 stars and wrote, "Elumale has a tight narrative that is interesting for the most part and makes for a decent watch". Elumale makes it into the top 3 movies of 2025.

== Home Media ==
Elumale satellite and digital rights are owned by Zee5. It was premiered on 17 October 2025.

== Accolades ==
Elumale was nominated for 14th SIIMA awards in 6 Categories.

Ceremony	Category	Nominee	Result
14th South Indian International Movie Awards	Best Director	Punit Rangaswamy	Nominated
14th South Indian International Movie Awards	Best Film	Atlanta Nagendra, Tharun Sudhir	Nominated
14th South Indian International Movie Awards	Best Female Playback Singer	Mangli	Nominated
14th South Indian International Movie Awards	Best Actor in a Negative Role	Kishore	Nominated
14th South Indian International Movie Awards	Best Debut Actress in Lead Role	Priyanka Achar	Won
14th South Indian International Movie Awards	Best Supporting Actor	T S Nagabharana	Nominated

Elumale was selected in the popular films section at 17th Bengaluru International Film Festival (BIFFes) 2026.

Award	Category	Nominee	Result
17th Bengaluru International Film Festival (BIFFes) 2026	Best Popular Film	Atlanta Nagendra, Tharun Sudhir	Nominated

Award	Category	Recipient	Result	Ref
Chandanavana Film Critics Awards 2026	Best Film	Atlanta Nagendra, Tharun Sudhir	Nominated	
Chandanavana Film Critics Awards 2026	Best Debut Actress	Priyanka Achar	Won	
Chandanavana Film Critics Awards 2026	Best Screenplay	Punit Rangaswamy	Won	
Chandanavana Film Critics Awards 2026	Best Supporting Actor	Kishore	Nominated	
Chandanavana Film Critics Awards 2026	Best Editor	Prakash K M	Won	
Chandanavana Film Critics Awards 2026	Best Music Director	D Imman	Nominated	
Chandanavana Film Critics Awards 2026	Best Background Score	D Imman	Nominated	
Chandanavana Film Critics Awards 2026	Best Stunt Choreography	Vinod	Nominated	
Chandanavana Film Critics Awards 2026	Best Male Singer	V M Mahalingam	Nominated	
Chandanavana Film Critics Awards 2026	Best Female Singer	Mangli	Nominated	
Chandanavana Film Critics Awards 2026	Best Director	Punit Rangaswamy	Nominated	

Elumale was selected for the AKKA CineGannada film festival 2026 and won awards in four categories.

Award	Category	Nominee	Result
AKKA CineGannada Film Festival 2026	Best First Film	Atlanta Nagendra, Tharun Sudhir	Won
AKKA CineGannada Film Festival 2026	Best Director	Punit Rangaswamy	Won
AKKA CineGannada Film Festival 2026	Best Music Director	D Imman	Won
AKKA CineGannada Film Festival 2026	Best Male Singer	V M Mahalingam	Won

Elumale won two awards at Chittara Star Awards 2026.

Award	Category	Nominee	Result
CHITTARA STAR AWARDS 2026	Best Promising Movie	Atlanta Nagendra, Tharun Sudhir	Won
CHITTARA STAR AWARDS 2026	Best Debut Actress	Priyanka Achar	Won

Elumale won two awards at Prajavani Cine Samman Awards 2026.

Award	Category	Nominee	Result
PRAJAVANI CINE SAMMAN AWARDS 2026	Best Screenplay	Punit Rangaswamy	Won
PRAJAVANI CINE SAMMAN AWARDS 2026	Best Debut Actress	Priyanka Achar	Won

Elumale won four awards at ChitraSanthe Film Awards 2026.

Award	Category	Nominee	Result
CHITRASANTHE FILM AWARDS 2026	Best Film Critics	Atlanta Nagendra, Tharun Sudhir	Won
CHITRASANTHE FILM AWARDS 2026	Favorite Hero	Raana	Won
CHITRASANTHE FILM AWARDS 2026	Favorite Director	Punit Rangaswamy	Won
CHITRASANTHE FILM AWARDS 2026	Best Supporting Role - Male	Kaddipudi Chandru	Won

== Box Office ==
Elumale collected around ₹ 5.25 crores as per IMDb. It was declared as box-office hit. First 10 days of collection was ₹ 3.25 crores
