= Bumboo =

- Directed by: Jagdish Rajpurohit
- Screenplay by: Jagdish Rajpurohit; Kavin Dave
- Story by: Francis Veber
- Produced by: RCL Motion Pictures
- Starring: Kavin Dave; Sharat Saxena; Sanjay Mishra
- Cinematography: Anil Singh; Ramshreyas Rao; S.C.Nair
- Edited by: Suvir Nath
- Music by: Original Songs; Santokh Singh Dhaliwal; Faiz Ur Rehman; Original Score; Dhruv Dalla
- Production companies: Rajpurohit Communications; TF1 International
- Distributed by: Jumping Tomato Marketing Pvt ltd
- Release date: 30 March 2012
- Running time: 126 minutes
- Country: India
- Language: Hindi
- Box office: ₹0.39 crore

Bumboo (transl. Extreme pain) is a 2012 Bollywood black comedy film directed by Jagdish Rajpurohit. Bumboo is based on an original play/film L'emmerdeur written by Francis Veber.The film stars Sharat Saxena, Sanjay Mishra, Kavin Dave and Mandy Takhar (in her Hindi debut) in lead roles and was released on 30 March 2012.

== Plot ==
Professional hitman Mangal Singh accepts a contract to kill stock market scammer Manu Gupta in front of the Goa High Court, where he is to stand trial. Mangal Singh plans to do the job in a hotel room opposite the court. Suresh Sudhakar, a press photographer, is sent to Goa to cover Manu Gupta's trial and checks in to the same hotel next to Mangal Singh's room. Sudhakar tries to meet his ex-wife, Pinky, who is living in Goa. Pinky refuses to meet up or even talk and confers with her new boyfriend, Dr. D'Souza. Sudhakar threatens Pinky that he might commit suicide, but she does not believe him. A depressed Sudhakar tries to commit suicide by hanging from the bathroom shower but fails. Bellboy Vincent (who is in Mangal Singh's room at that moment) hears the ruckus and opens the connecting door between Mangal Singh and Sudhakar's room, leading to the characters interacting with each other. Mangal Singh, afraid that cops might come to the room, assures Vincent that he will take care of Sudhakar. Assured by this promise, Vincent leaves Sudhakar in the care of Mangal. Sudhakar, meanwhile, assumes that Mangal is a truly good Samaritan, and taking fancy for his friendship does not let Mangal go anywhere or let him do his job. Pinky's boyfriend, Dr. D'Souza (a psychiatrist), comes to the hotel to counsel Sudhakar not to commit suicide, but ends up meeting Mangal, who mistakes him for Sudhakar and gives him a sedative, preventing him from performing any work. Completely baffled by this turn of events, Mangal forces Sudhakar to call the doctor back, who now comes with Pinky and wakes Mangal up, but not before Pinky and Sudhakar have a conversation. This distresses the Dr.

Pinky has a major showdown with both Dr. D'Souza and Sudhakar and leaves only to return and speak again to Sudhakar and convince him to go away. During the course of the story, Manu Gupta's entourage can be seen, travelling from Bombay to Goa in a police van disguised as a milk van with a group of commandos in it.

Manu Gupta finally reaches Goa, but before he can be shot by Mangal, tremendous ruckus follows in the room where Mangal, Sudhakar, a cop, and others fight it out and end up dangling from the hotel while a shot is accidentally fired from Mangal's gun and hits Manu Gupta's behind. Despite this, Manu Gupta reaches the court and gives his witness account. Mangal Singh retires to an ashram due to the shock of forced friendship thrust upon him. Sudhakar gets Pinky back.

== Cast ==
- Kavin Dave as Suresh Sudhakar
- Sharat Saxena as Mangal Singh
- Sanjay Mishra as Vincent Gomes
- Sudhir Pandey as Manu Gupta
- Sumit Kaul as Dr. Brendon D’souza
- Mandy Takhar as Pinky
- Jagdish Rajpurohit as Sultubhai
- Sariika Singh as Lata

== Soundtrack ==
Bumboo

Soundtrack album by Santokh Singh and Faiz-Ur-Rehman
- Genre: Feature film soundtrack
- Length: 17:34
- Language: Hindi
- Label: Moser Baer
External audio
- Audio Jukebox on YouTube

The soundtrack of Bumboo consists of five songs composed by Santokh Singh and Faiz-Ur-Rehman the lyrics of which were written by Shadab Akhtar and Nadeem Asad.

Tracklist
No.	Title	Lyrics	Singer(s)	Length
1.	"Life Saali Life"	Shadab Akhtar	Mika Singh	03:23
2.	"Life Saali Life" (Remix)	Shadab Akhtar	Mika Singh	03:24
3.	"Pinky Punjabi"	Shadab Akhtar	Santokh Singh, Javed Ali & Sunidhi Chauhan	03:22
4.	"Pinky" (Reprise)	Shadab Akhtar	Javed Ali & Sunidhi Chauhan	03:22
5.	"Lag Gaya Bumboo"	Nadeem Asad	Munnan Ali Khan	04:03
Total length:				17:34

== Release ==
Bumboo was released on 30 Mar 2012.

== Critical reception ==
The Times of India gave the film a rating of 3 out of 5 saying that, "As sniper Mangal, Sharat Saxena mostly holds it together, the film showing a few bright flashes, but then slipping into low-brow comedy that's so self-consciously 'thay-ter' (theater)." Sudhish Kamath of The Hindu said that, "A wannabe Bheja Fry, this crass, scatalogical humour-infested stagey remake is just about funny enough to make you source out the French original L'emmerdeur (“ A Pain in the Ass”)." Taran Adarsh of Bollywood Hungama gave the film a rating of 1.5 out of 5 and said that, "On the whole, BUMBOO tries too hard to be funny and that’s why it misfires. Besides, a weak script, abrupt conclusion and bizarre characters only go against it!" Rohit Vats of News18 gave the film a rating of 1.5 out of 5 and said that, "'Bumboo' is a film made with good intentions but somehow the makers couldn't transform the original idea onto the celluloid." Shubhra Gupta of The Indian Express gave the film a rating of 1 out of 5 saying that, "This may have been a good idea in the original. In the copy, an official Indo-French collaboration, it turns out to be non-stop bilge."
