= Joke Falls =

- Directed by: Ashok Patil
- Written by: Ashok Patil, Atlanta Nagendra
- Screenplay by: Ashok Patil
- Based on: Chhadmabeshi by Agradoot
- Produced by: Atlanta Nagendra
- Starring: Ramesh Aravind; Neetha; Deepali; Dilip Thadeshwar
- Cinematography: Ashok Kashyap
- Edited by: T. Shashi Kumar
- Music by: Mano Murthy
- Production company: Om Creations
- Release date: 3 December 2004
- Running time: 2 hours 31 minutes
- Country: India
- Language: Kannada
- Budget: ₹1 crore

Joke Falls is a 2004 Indian Kannada-language comedy movie, directed by Ashok Patil and produced by Atlanta Nagendra. The film stars Ramesh Aravind, Neetha, Deepali and Dilip Thadeshwar. Music was composed by Mano Murthy. The movie is a remake of the 1971 Bengali film Chhadmabeshi. The film's title is a reference to the popular Jog Falls.

== Plot ==
Botany professor Anant Patil falls in love with Sulekha and marries her to the dismay of Sulekha's brother in law, Raghav Joshi. Raghav refuses to attend the wedding. But Anant decides to turn the tables on Raghav and teach him a lesson.

== Cast ==
- Ramesh Aravind as Anant Patil, botany professor
- Neetha as Sulekha
- Deepali as Vasudha
- Dilip Thadeshwar as Sukumar
- Pallavi as Kamala
- Sudha Belawadi
- Sharan as N. A. Prashanth, Close friend of Ananth
- H. G. Dattatreya as Raghavendra Joshi, a lawyer
- Jayalakshmi
- Nagarathna
- Lambu Nagesh
- Sanketh Kashi
- Nagashekar
- Shivaram (Kulla)
- Michael Madhu
- Sihi Kahi Chandru
- M. S. Umesh

== Production ==
Director Patil devised the basic plot of the story from the Hindi movie Chupke Chupke and reworked it to give it a fresh look. Patil then recruited Ramesh Aravind to act in the film. Newcomer Neethu was chosen to play the female lead. Deepali, who had previously acted in Nanna Preethiya Hudugi, was chosen to play the second female lead.

== Soundtrack ==
Joke Falls

Soundtrack album by Mano Murthy
- Released: 2004
- Genre: Film soundtrack

The music is scored by Mano Murthy and was big hit.

Song title	Singers
"Gandhavathi"	Rajesh Krishnan
"Swaraga Shrusthi Modala"	Rajesh & Chetan Sosca
"Nanna Beladingalu Neenu"	Kavita Krishnamurthy
"O Prema Tangaliye"	Nanditha
"Naguvina Loka Idu"	Chetan Sosca & Nanditha

== Release and reception ==
Joke Falls was released on 3 December 2004. The film received a good response, and ran for a hundred days in Bangalore. It was the first Kannada movie to run for twenty five weeks in PVR Cinemas in Bangalore.

Joke Falls received positive reviews from critics as well as audiences. A critic from Deccan Herald wrote that "The film is hilarious comedy". A critic from Sify wrote that "If you are looking for a comedy film, go ahead and watch it". A critic from Viggy wrote that if you can forget the film's drawbacks, "its laughter laughter and laughter all the way".

The movie also saw screenings in Australia, Canada, and the United States.
