= Uuf Kya Jaadoo Mohabbat Hai =

2004 Indian Film

- DVD cover
- Directed by: Manoj J. Bhatia
- Starring: Sammir Dattani; Pooja Kanwal
- Music by: Sandesh Shandilya
- Production company: Rajshri Productions
- Release date: 21 May 2004
- Country: India
- Language: Hindi

Uuf Kya Jaadoo Mohabbat Hai is a 2004 Indian Hindi-language romantic drama film directed by Manoj J. Bhatia. The film stars newcomers Sammir Dattani and Pooja Kanwal. The film was the first Hindi film of Dattani and was a box office flop. After this film, Kanwal took a hiatus from Hindi films.

== Cast ==
- Sammir Dattani as Yash Thakur
- Pooja Kanwal as Pari Choudhry
- Mini as Sunita
- Aziz as Anand
- Sachin Khedekar as Kumar Choudhry
- Daisy Irani as Nirmala
- Mrinal Kulkarni as Sushma
- Tushar Dalvi as Ajit
- Akshay Anand as Raj Chaudhry
- Master Yash Pathak as Rahul
- Minnie Tiwari as Ana

== Soundtrack ==
Music by Sandesh Shadnilya. Singer Kunal Ganjawala got his break with this film. A critic from PlanetBollywood.com said that "Overall, UKJMH has its share of good and its share of not so good. Nonetheless, UKJMH is a good album to have for all music lovers".

- "Shehzaadi" - Kunal Ganjawala
- "Shukriya" - Kunal Ganjawala, Runa
- "Dost" - Sunidhi Chauhan
- "Happy Birthday"
- "Uff Kya Jaadoo Mohabbat Hai" (version 1) - Sunidhi Chauhan
- "Uff Kya Jaadoo Mohabbat Hai" (version 2) - Sunidhi Chauhan (piano played by Richard Clayderman)
- "Tum Pe" - Sonu Nigam, Chitra
- "Jagmag" - Vinod Rathod, Chitra
- "Dekhar Dil" - K.K., Sunaidhi Chauhan, Runa, Vinod Rathod

== Reception ==
Taran Adarsh of Bollywood Hungama gave the film a rating of one-and-a-half out of five stars and said that "On the whole, UUF KYA JAADOO MOHABBAT HAI?! has some appeal for the youth, who may take to it initially. But it just doesn't have the jaadoo to sustain in the wake of strong oppositions in the coming weeks".
