= Amit Sahni Ki List =

- Film poster
- Directed by: Ajay Bhuyan
- Written by: Shiv Singh, Rohit Banawlikar
- Produced by: Pyxis Pictures, Tina Nagpaul, Kavita Kulkarni, Sujata Vemuri.
- Starring: Vir Das; Vega Tamotia; Anindita Nayar
- Cinematography: Maneesh Chandra Bhatt
- Edited by: Shakti Hasija
- Music by: Raghu Dixit, Palash Muchhal, Alien Chutney, Shivi. R. Kashyap and Karthik Iyer.
- Production company: Pyxis Pictures
- Release date: 18 July 2014
- Country: India
- Language: Hindi

Amit Sahni Ki List (transl. Amit Sahni's list) is a 2014 Indian Hindi-language romantic comedy film produced by Pyxis Pictures, and directed by Ajay Bhuyan. The film stars Vir Das, Vega Tamotia and Anindita Nayar, and features Kavi Shastri, Natasha Rastogi and Duboree Das in supporting roles. It is co-produced by Tina Nagpaul, Kavita Kulkarni and Sujata Vemuri under the banner of Pyxis Pictures. The film was released on 18 July 2014.

== Plot ==
Amit Sahni (played by Vir Das) is a young and quirky investment banker who is searching for the woman of his dreams—the woman of his list. After a painful breakup during his teenage days, Amit has noted down all the traits that he is looking for in the perfect woman, or Miss Right, and every time he goes out on a date, he secretly checks to see if his date matches the list. The interesting twists and turns that take place on account of the list and his quest for Miss Right make for an interesting comedy.

== Cast ==
- Vir Das as Amit Sahni
- Vega Tamotia as Mala
- Anindita Nayar as Devika
- Kavi Shastri as Amit's Childhood Friend Pushkar
- Natasha Rastogi as Amit's Mother
- Pooja Ruparel as Priya
- Micky Makhija as Amit's Father
- Duboree Das as Pinki
- Natasha Bhardwaj as Natasha
- Khalida Khan as Sheena

== Soundtrack ==
The makers of the film roped in talented artists including croons such as Raghu Dixit and Palash Muchhal to compose music tracks. The 19-year-old Palash Muchhal, fresh from the success of "Party to Banti Hai" composed the peppy party song "What the Fark" (meaning "What is the Difference" in English) for Amit Sahni Ki List. The sound tracks of the movie include a wide range of songs offering something for everyone including foot tapping dance floor numbers, soft romantic songs and a violin masterpiece. There is also a rocking "Anti-love" song which is a tribute of sorts to "Bhag D.K. Bose" from Delhi Belly and is sung by Vir Das himself, which marks his debut as a playback singer.

The music was released on 18 June 2014.

The sound design for the movie is done by the Oscar winner Resul Pookutty

Track	Song title	Singers	Composer	Lyricist
1	Ab Mein Kya Karoon	Raghu Dixit	Raghu Dixit	Ankur Tiwari
2	What the "FARK"	Rahul Vaidya, Amit Mishra, Aditi Singh Sharma	Palash Muchhal	Ajay Bhuyan, Tina Nagpaul
3	Pyar Hai Kutti Cheez	Vir Das	Warren Mendonsa / Sidd Coutto	Vir Das
4	Aisi Hi Hoon Mein	Shivi R. Kashyap	Shivi R. Kashyap	Shivi R. Kashyap, Shiv Singh Benawra
5	Sargoshi	Palak Muchhal, Anirudh Bhola	Palash Muchhal	Palak Muchhal
6	Waakeyi	Nikhil D'Souza, Shruti Pathak	Raghu Dixit	Ankur Tiwari
7	Parchhai	Sonu Nigam	Palash Muchhal	Palak Muchhal
8	Violin Recital	-	Karthick Iyer	-

Reviews applaud the music as surprisingly listenable ensemble. The nifty rock arrangements of Pyar Hai Kutti Cheez (Warren Mendonsa-Sid Coutto) is its highlight, while Shivi Kashyap does a great job in the bouncy techno-pop number Aisi Hi Hoon Mein. Composed by Palash Muchhal, What the Fark is a catchy dance-floor song, and the dulcet melodies, Sargoshi and Parchhai, two variations of the same tune with Sonu Nigam, Palak Muchhal and Anirudh Bola doing their parts well. Ab Mein Kya Karoon, sung by Raghu Dixit himself, features some wonderful guitar, brass and flute with the tune depicting the fun for the movie. With Nikhil D'Souza and Shruti Pathak ably assisting on the vocals, Raghu Dixit's Waakeyi is softly romantic. The album has the highlight from Karthick Iyer, who does wonders with the astounding violin instrumental Violin Recital. Amit Sahni Ki List has a big list of composers, with the result being a surprisingly enjoyable ensemble offering something for everyone at various stages of their life.

== Production ==
=== Development ===
After spending more than a decade in the Financial Industry in New York, Tina Nagpaul, Kavita Kulkarni and Sujata Vemuri, have created an independent production house producing interesting content for television and cinema. Amit Sahni Ki List is the first movie release under the Pyxis Pictures Banner. The film is directed by Ajay Bhuyan and is based on the story by Rohit Banawlikar.

=== Casting ===
During 2012, Vir Das was reportedly doing many leading comedy shows, particularly focused on relationships and the changing cultural shift in India. He was viewed by the producers as a perfect fit for the role, given his unique connectivity with youth audiences and comic timing.

=== Marketing ===
The Central Board of Film Certification (CBFC) cleared the film as U/A. The movie is youth oriented, but provides interesting comedy for all ages, giving a perspective on the trials and tribulations one has to endure to find love. The movie's official teaser was released online on 14 June 2014 and got very positive comments from wide spread audience. DNA Online reiterated that the trailer is promising, much to their expectations of the movie being one of the 9 must see movies for the remainder of 2014 as projected by them in May 2014.

The official trailer was well received by critics, and garnered praise from experts around the industry as being unique and different in offering smart comedy and laughs while successfully highlighting practical issues faced by professionals in finding the right partner based on a list.

Actor Vir Das emphasized that the main challenge for him was to add comedy while acting in highly sensitive scenes and show the unexpected twists and practical issues faced by youth in finding a suitable life partner in this current age of Google.

== See also ==
- List of Bollywood films of 2014
