= Chhadmabeshi =

- Directed by: Agradoot (Note: The pen name of a group of Indian film technicians in Bengali cinema signing collectively as director.)
- Based on: Chhadmabeshi by Upendranath Ganguly
- Screenplay by: Subir Hazra; Additional screenplay: Mahendra Chakraborty
- Story by: Upendranath Ganguly
- Produced by: Shib Narayan Dutta; Bibhuti Laha
- Starring: Uttam Kumar; Madhabi Mukherjee
- Cinematography: Bibhuti Laha; Baidyanath Basak
- Edited by: Baidyanath Chatterjee
- Music by: Sudhin Dasgupta
- Production company: Chalachitra Bharati
- Distributed by: Sheema Films
- Release date: 26 November 1971
- Running time: 122 minutes
- Country: India
- Language: Bengali

Chhadmabeshi (Bengali pronunciation: [tʃʰɔd̪mabɛʃi] transl. Disguiser) is a 1971 Bengali-language comedy film directed by Agradoot. Produced by Bibhuti Laha and Shib Narayan Dutta under the banner of Chalacchitra Bharati in their second production, the film stars Uttam Kumar and Madhabi Mukherjee, alongside an ensemble cast of Subhendu Chatterjee, Bikash Roy, Tarun Kumar, Anubha Gupta, Jyotsna Biswas, Shamita Biswas and Jahor Roy in another pivotal roles.

Based on a story of the same name by Upendranath Ganguly, the film revolves around a newly married professor, who plays a practical joke upon his brother-in-law by posing as his family driver. Chhadmabeshi marks the seventeenth collaboration between Agradoot and Kumar, also indicating the third collaboration between Kumar and Mukherjee as the lead pair. The film was predominantly shot in Allahbad, while portions were shot in Kolkata and Mumbai. Music of the film is composed by Sudhin Dasgupta, who also penned its lyrics along with Bhaskar Roy and Patita Paban Banerjee. Laha himself handled its cinematography, and Baidyanath Chatterjee edited the film.

Chhadmabeshi was theatrically released on 26 November 1971, opening to general positive response both critically and commercially. Running for over 47 weeks in theatres, it eventually gained a cult status among the Bengali audiences, with The Times of India ranking Chhadmabeshi amongst their list of Bengali cinema's greatest comedy films.

The film was remade in Hindi in 1975 as Chupke Chupke and in Kannada in 2004 as Joke Falls.

== Plot ==
Professor Abanish Mitra, who teaches botany, is newly married to Sulekha. He is known for playing pranks and is the antithesis of regular professors while Sulekha is in awe of Advocate Prashanta Ghosh, the so-called "highly-intellectual" husband of her older sister, Labanya, and looks upon him as her idol. Thanks to Sulekha's excessive praise of Prashanta, Abanish develops an inferiority complex and decides to prove that he is in no way a lesser mortal. Meanwhile, Prashanta has written a letter to Sulekha and Sumitra's older brother Haripada, instructing him to send a driver for him to his residence in Allahbad, who can speak good Bengali language because his present driver, Mosaheb Lal, uses improper dialect. This provides the perfect opportunity for Abanish to get to see and interact with Prashanta, playing a practical joke upon them.

Going to Allahbad, in front of Prashanta, Abanish disguises himself as "Gourhari Basu", a motor-mouth driver, who pretends to hate the English language and so speaks only Bengali. Since Prashanta is a stickler for good manners and impeccable prowess over Bengali, Abanish presents a blemish-free profile as Gourhari. Both Prashanta and Labanya are happy with him as driver, mainly because Moshaheb Lal, their other driver, is cheeky and inept, and is known for robbing his employer of petty sums complaining of niggling technical motor problems. Eventually, Gourhari appears a God-send and gets selected as the driver by Prashanta. Although he was praised for his in-depth knowledge of driving and car mechanics, Gourhari keeps pelting them with silly queries, raising questions on the funniness of the English language.

As per Abanish's plans, Sulekha declares her arrival at Allahabad some days later, and lies to Prashanta and her sister Labanya that being involved in some important work, Abanish will arrive after a few days. Gourhari's eyes brighten, much to the irritation of the Ghoshs, who find a servant's joy at Sulekha's arrival highly inappropriate. In the next few days, Prashanta and Labanya notice and are by the intimacy between the new driver and Sulekha. They are further annoyed when she talks to him endlessly, sings with him, sits with him in the front seat in the car and has only pleasant things to say about this unnerving irritant. Firstly, Sulekha pretends to know Gourhari and hardly talks of Abanish, her boring husband, and secondly, they put across the impression that Sulekha is having an extramarital affair with Gourhari, which perturbs Prashanta and Labanya. Both of them keep worrying that when Abanish will come to Allahabad, he will get extremely angry seeing his wife getting cozy with this servant. Meanwhile, their suspicions grow when a packet of cigarettes and above all, a burnt cigarette were found in Sulekha's room, which Abanish himself had accidentally smoked and left behind.

All on a sudden, Abanish and Sulekha elope from Prashanta's house to Kanpur, to go on their honeymoon, keeping Prashanta and Labanya in disappointment. Abanish hires his long-time friend, Subimal Ghosh, a professor of Physics, to temporarily act as Abanish and portrays him as a serious and boring lecturer, the complete opposite of the real Abanish's character. On the other hand, his another long-time and Allahbad-based friend Binoy Sen, is also party to the prank, who was even Prashanta's old acquaintance and brotherly. Basudha, the younger sister of Binoy, suspects fake "Abanish" (Subimal) of infidelity to his wife, "Sulekha", when he tries to grow close to her. Subimal falls in love with Basudha, who initially believes him to be Abanish, but Sukumar reveals her the real drama behind all this mix-up of situations, while Latika is also furious over the latest "extramarital" affair.

However, towards the end, Subimal and Basudha escape from home and get married in a temple with the blessings of Binoy. To Prashanta's surprise, Gourhari appears there along with Sulekha. There, Haripada coerces Gourhari to "kill" himself so that Abanish could surface. Thus, Prashanta, Labanya and Latika come to comprehend the whole enactment with Prashanta finally admitting that he was truly fooled. The film revolves around the resolution of these funny mishaps.

== Cast ==
- Uttam Kumar as Abanish Mitra, a professor of botany / Gourhari Basu / Pundarikaksha Purakayasta
- Madhabi Mukherjee as Sulekha, Abanish's wife
- Bikash Roy as Advocate Prashanta Ghosh, Sulekha's brother-in-law
- Subhendu Chatterjee as Subimal Ghosh, a professor of physics
- Tarun Kumar as Binoy Sen, Abanish's friend
- Anubha Gupta as Labanya, Sulekha's elder sister
- Jyotsna Biswas as Basudha, Binoy's sister and Subimal's love interest
- Ashok Mitra as Haripada, Labanya and Sulekha's elder brother
- Jahor Roy as Mosaheb Lal, Prashanta's driver
- Samita Biswas as Latika, Binoy's wife

== Soundtrack ==
Chhadmabeshi

Soundtrack album by Sudhin Dasgupta
- Released: 1971
- Recorded: 1970
- Studio: Chalachchitra Bharati
- Length: 0:16:41
- Label: Saregama
- Producers: Shib Narayan Dutta, Bibhuti Laha

Sudhin Dasgupta chronology
Joy Bangla (1970)	Chhadmabeshi (1971)	Jiban Saikate (1971)

All lyrics are written by Bhaskar Roy, Sudhin Dasgupta; all music is composed by Sudhin Dasgupta

Songs
No.	Title	Playback	Length
1.	"Amar Din Kate Na"	Asha Bhonsle	3:22
2.	"Aaro Dure Chalo Jai"	Asha Bhonsle	3:24
3.	"Ami Kon Pathe Je Chali"	Manna Dey	3:15
4.	"Aare Chho Chho Kya Saramke Baat"	Anup Ghoshal	3:34
5.	"Banchaao Ke Aachho"	Manna Dey	3:06
Total length:			16:41

== Reception ==
Times Of India wrote that This is a evergreen classic comedy with perfect comic timing make it ideal to watching anytime.

The film become super hit at the box office and ran for 126 days in theaters at Kolkata.

== Remakes ==
The film is remade in Hindi in 1975 as Chupke Chupke directed by the legendary Hrishikesh Mukherjee, starring Dharmendra, Sharmila Tagore and Amitabh Bachchan. It's remade again in Kannada in 2004 as Joke Falls
