= Mumbhai Connection =

- Theatrical release poster
- Directed by: Atlanta Nagendra
- Screenplay by: Atlanta Nagendra
- Produced by: Abbas Moloo, Nawal Parwal, Sathya Narayanan Rafiq Batcha
- Starring: Rafiq Batcha; Srinivas; Dick Mays; Alieesa P. Badresia
- Edited by: Giri Mahesh Srikanth SH
- Production companies: Rafiq Media Productions; De Arte Studios
- Release dates: 24 September 2011 (Dixie Film Festival); 22 August 2014 (India)
- Country: India
- Language: Hindi

Mumbhai Connection is a 2011 Hindi-language film shot entirely in Atlanta, USA. The film was set to release theatrically in August 2014 It is directed by Atlanta Nagendra, who also wrote the screenplay. It is produced by Abbas Moloo, Nawal Parwal, Sathya Narayanan and Rafiq Batcha. The music director is Praveen Duth Stephen.

== Synopsis ==
Faisal, an Indian salesman, is hired at an Atlanta IT company where he learns that its run by the Mumbai mafia. He is forced to sell IT services to the Atlanta mafia but they are not interested. Now Faisal's life is on the line and the only way he can get out alive is by going boldly where no salesman has gone before.

== Cast ==
- Rafiq Batcha: Faisal Khan
- Srinivas: Kal
- Dick Mays: Gambino
- Alieesa P. Badresia: Tara
- Chrissy Chambers: Angela
- Eli Jones: Igor
- David Peirce: Vinny

== Soundtrack ==
Mumbhai Coneection

Soundtrack album by Praveen Dutt Stephen
- Released: 7 June 2014
- Genre: Feature film soundtrack
- Length: 4:36
- Label: Worldwide Records

| No. | Title | Singer(s) | Length |
|---|---|---|---|
| 1. | "Bella Notte" | Sunidhi Chauhan | 4:36 |
| Total length: | | | 4:36 |

== Release ==
Mumbhai Connection has been shown at the following film festivals.

- 7th Atlanta Asian Film Festival 2011
- Third World Indie Film Festival 2011
- 8th Dixie Film Festival Atlanta 2011
- 10th Urban Mediamakers Film Festival2011
- 2nd Bronze Lens Film Festival 2011
- 4th Bengaluru International Film Festival 2011
- 7th Annual Macon Film Festival 2012
- South Asian Film Festival 2012

== Accolades ==
- Winner – Best Comedy Third World Indie Film Festival 2011
- Winner – Best Comedy 7th Atlanta Asian Film Festival 2011
- Winner – Best Key Art Design 10th Urban Mediamakers Film Festival 2011
- Winner – 3rd Best Film in Feature Film Category 10th Urban Mediamakers Film Festival 2011
