= Kavin Dave =

Indian actor (born 1984)

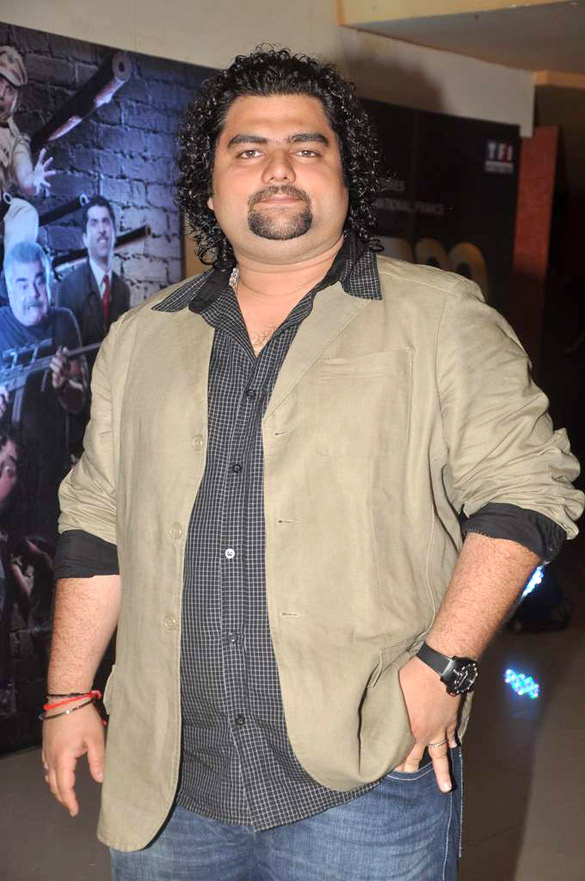
- Born: 12 November 1984 (age 41)
- Occupation: Actor

Kavin Dave (born 12 November 1984) is an Indian film and television actor. He works in the Indian film industry. Dave made his big screen debut in the movie Mumbai Meri Jaan in 2008. This was followed by further successful films including My Name Is Khan, I Hate Luv Storys, Crook, Shirin Farhad Ki Toh Nikal Padi and Kick. Dave played the lead role in the film Bumboo. After featuring in several television commercials for popular brands including Sprite, Vodafone, Dish TV, Fortune oil, Sil jam and Center shock, he got a role of Huzaifa in the very popular television sitcom Rishta.com. Dave made his Tollywood debut with the Telugu film Money Money, More Money.

== Filmography ==
- Junoon (1994–98) as Vishal Rajvansh (child actor)
- Filmy Chakkar (1993-1996) - Bunty
- Jai Hanuman (1997) – Bal Hanuman and Bal Raavan
- Mumbai Meri Jaan (2008)
- Bedundh – Marathi film (2009)
- Crook: It's Good to Be Bad (2010)
- I Hate Luv Storys (2010)
- Teen Patti (film) (2010)
- My Name Is Khan (2010)
- Money Money, More Money - Telugu film (2011)
- Shirin Farhad Ki Toh Nikal Padi (2012)
- Kyaa Super Kool Hain Hum (2012)
- Bumboo (2012)
- Chemistry (2013)
- Siyaasat (2014) - Qutubuddin Koka
- 3 A.M. (2014)
- Bey Yaar - Gujarati film (2014)
- Kick (2014)
- Ishqedarriyaan (2015)
- Gujarat 11 - Gujarati Film (2019)
- Scam 1992 - The Harshad Mehta Story (2020) - Rakesh Jhunjhunwala
- Cash (2021 Film)
- Maja Ma (2022 Film)
- Dhoom Dhaam (2025 film)
- Andhera (2025 series)
- Mrs. Deshpande (2025 series)
- Ek Din (2026 film)
