= Leslie Tripathy =

Indian actress

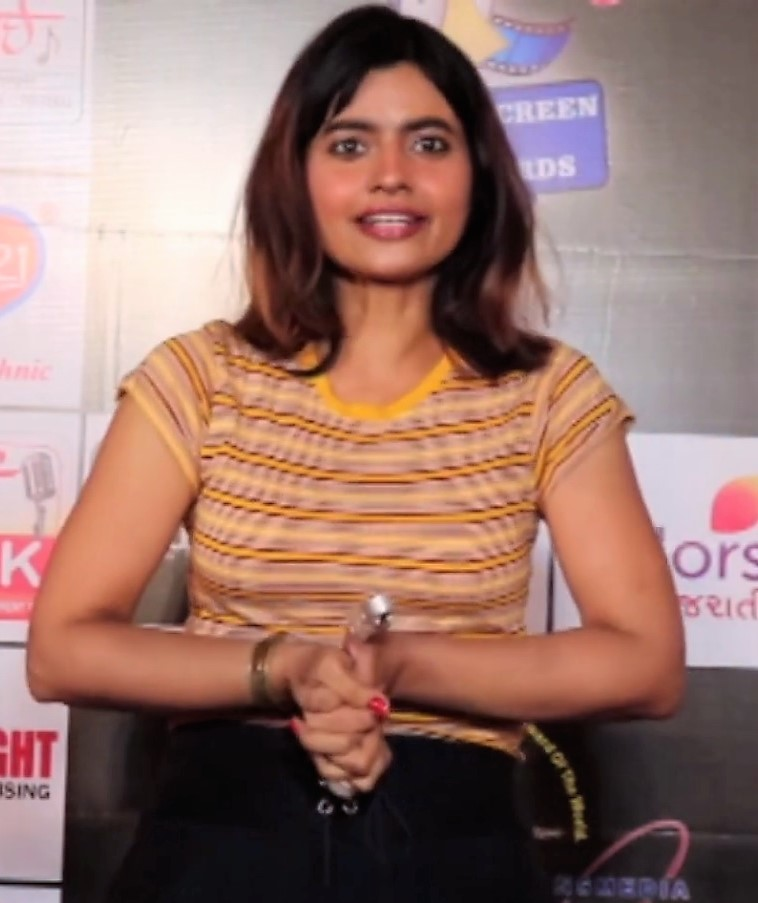
- Tripathy at the 19th Transmedia Gujarati Film And TV Awards in 2020
- Born: Leslie Ann Tripathy; 26 June 1990 (age 35); Berhampur, Odisha, India
- Occupations: Actress, model
- Years active: 2014–present

Leslie Ann Tripathy is an Indian actress who first appeared in Odia music videos and film then in Bollywood. In 2014, Tripathy debuted in the Hindi film industry with the movie W.

== Early life and background ==
Tripathy is the first child of Dr. Sailendra Narayan Tripathy, a professor in English and Ashoka Tripathy, a teacher in English literature. Tripathy has a younger brother, Shakespeare King, who is a model turned Actor who generally works in Indian Adult film industry. She is an alumna of BJB College. She studied journalism from Asian College of Journalism, Chennai. She has written articles and has campaigned in for women's rights. Before entering into the Bollywood industry, Tripathy was active in the Odia film industry, including videos and some films.

== Career ==
Tripathy started her Bollywood career with the 2014 film W, playing the character of Roohi Malik, a rape victim. She appeared in her first Telugu debut movie Chusinodiki Chusinantha, starring with Sivaji.

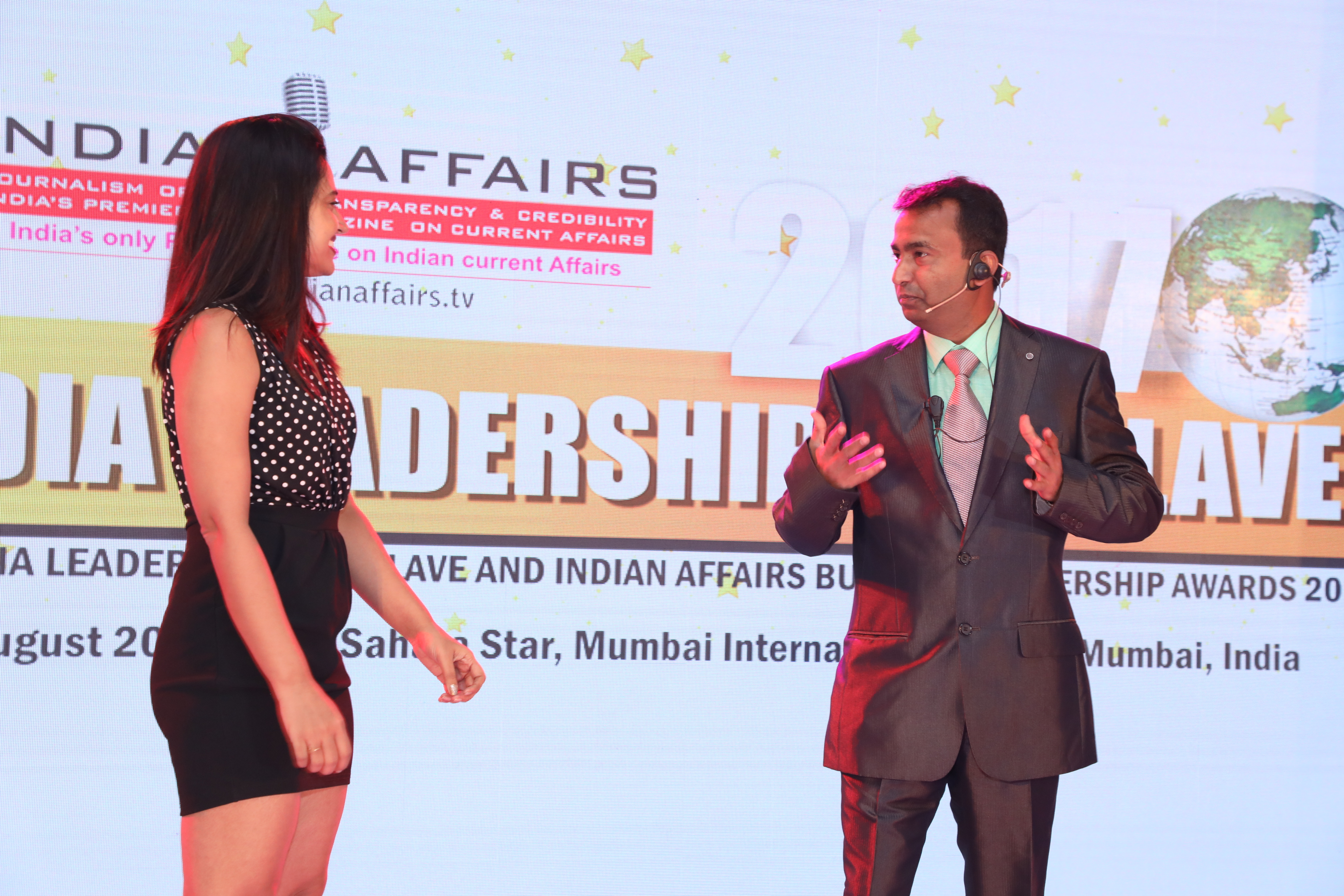
Actress Leslie at India Leadership Conclave with Founder Satya Brahma

Leslie was invited to speak as an ILC Power Brand Speaker on "Countering the attack of Cyberspace trolling, body shaming, stalking, rape & death threat" at the Satya Brahma-founded India Leadership Conclave in Mumbai on 4 August 2017 at Hotel Sahara Star.

== Filmography ==
Year	Film	Role	Language
2014	W	Roohi Malik	Hindi
2014	Chusinodiki Chusinantha	Angel	Telugu
TBA	Idhu Vedhalam Sollum Kadhai	Moha	Tamil
2017	Rangrasiya	Naina	Chhattisgarhi
2017	Nirahua Hindustani 2	Parineeta	Bhojpuri
2018	Rangobati	Naina, Maina (Double role)	Chhattisgarhi
2020	Jindagi	Tina	Hindi
2021	Bhaadaa	Rinku	Hindi
2022	Ek Apoorna Katha	Neha	Hindi
2024	Rocky The Slave	Rita	Hindi
2024	Mera Bhola Hai Bhandari	Tina	Bhojpuri
2025	Kachra	Tina Madam	Hindi
2026	A Woman of Steel	Lily	English
