= Pyar Ka Live Show =

- Directed by: Shailendra Singh Rajput
- Written by: Shailendra Singh Rajput
- Screenplay by: Shailendra Singh Rajput
- Produced by: Vinod Singh
- Starring: Ishrat Ali; Rudraksh Pundhir; Rajni Mehta; Upasana Singh; Mushtaq Khan; Adi Irani; Shiva Rindani; Rajesh Sonune; Baby Arundahi Pathak
- Cinematography: Yash Chi Chi
- Edited by: Vikas Mahadik
- Music by: Various Artists
- Production company: M. Film's Creations
- Distributed by: M. Film's Creations
- Release date: 21 February 2014
- Running time: 120 minutes
- Country: India
- Language: Hindi

Pyar Ka Live Show (transl. Love's live show) is a 2014 Indian Hindi-language romance film directed by Shailendra Singh Rajput and produced by Vinod Singh under the M. Film's Creations banner. The film was released on 21 February 2014.

== Cast ==
- Ishrat Ali
- Rudraksh Pundhir
- Rajni Mehta
- Upasana Singh
- Mushtaq Khan
- Adi Irani
- Shiva Rindani
- Rajesh Sonune
- Baby Arundahi Pathak

== Plot ==
Pyar Ka Live Show is about a young romance blooming and how the couple encounters various twists and turns in their simple love story.
