= Sameer Dattani =

Indian Kannada language actor

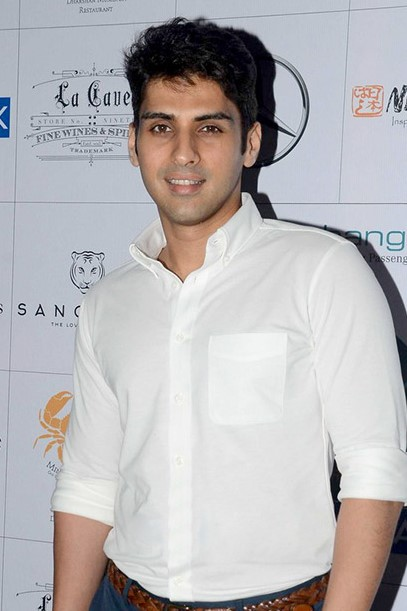
- Sameer Dattani in 2017
- Born: 27 January 1982 (age 44); Mumbai, India
- Other name: Dhyan
- Occupations: Actor; Businessman
- Years active: 2001–2015
- Spouse: Ritika Jolly

Sameer Dattani, also known as Dhyan (in the Kannada film industry), is an Indian businessman and former actor who appeared as a lead in Hindi, Kannada and Tamil films.

He later became executive director of Sanathan Textiles Limited, founded by his family a century ago, an Indian manufacturer of polyester filament yarn, cotton yarn, and technical textile yarns. He was appointed to the company's board of directors on 26 May 2025. Within the company, he oversees the Fully Drawn Yarn (FDY) business, leads the procurement of polyester raw materials, and is involved in corporate strategy, branding, and digital transformation initiatives.

== Acting career ==
Born into a Gujarati-speaking Lohana family in Bombay, Dattani has worked in predominantly Hindi and Kannada films. He is fluent in several languages.

Dattani appeared in the Kannada-language film Nanna Preethiya Hudugi. Besides Monalisa, other Kannada film appearances include Amrithadhare.

Dattani started his Hindi film career with Rajshri Productions. His first Hindi film Uuf Kya Jaadoo Mohabbat Hai was followed by roles in Madhur Bhandarkar's Corporate and Vikram Bhatt's Life Mein Kabhie Kabhie as well as films such as Pyar Mein Twist. In the Hindi film Mukhbir, directed by Mani Shankar, Dattani played the lead role of an undercover police informer.

Dattani's first Tamil film, produced by Gemini Films, was Kutty with Dhanush and Shriya Saran.

Shyam Benegal cast him in Well Done Abba (2010), alongside Boman Irani and Minissha Lamba. After premiering at international film festivals in Montreal, Dubai and London, it had its commercial release 26 March 2010.

In 2010, Dattani appeared in Dharma Productions', I Hate Luv Storys.

== Filmography ==
Year	Title	Role	Language	Notes
2001	Nanna Preethiya Hudugi	Puttu	Kannada	Lead role
2004	Monalisa	Dhyan	Kannada	Lead role
2004	Uuf Kya Jaadoo Mohabbat Hai	Yash	Hindi	Lead role
2005	Jootata	Sanjay	Kannada	Lead role
2005	Pyaar Mein Twist	Sanjay	Hindi	Supporting role
2005	Amrithadhare	Puru	Kannada	Lead role
2006	Corporate	Anmol Rawat	Hindi	Supporting role
2006	Jackpot	Raja	Kannada	Lead role
2007	Sajni	Vikram	Kannada	Lead role
2007	Life Mein Kabhie Kabhiee	Jai Gokhale	Hindi	Lead role
2008	Dhoom Dadakka	Ranbir/Kamal Shankar	Hindi	Lead role
2008	Neene Neene	Abhishek	Kannada	Lead role
2008	Mukhbiir	Mukhbir	Hindi	Lead role
2010	Kutty	Arjun Devanayagam	Tamil	Lead role
2010	Well Done Abba	Arif Ali	Hindi	Lead role
2010	I Hate Luv Storys	Raj Dholakia	Hindi	Supporting role
2010	Mallika	Saahil	Hindi	Lead role
2010	Huduga Hudugi	Sachin	Kannada	Lead role
2014	Mr. and Mrs. Ramachari	Akash	Kannada	Cameo appearance
2015	Love U Alia	Suman	Kannada	Cameo appearance
