= Sonal Giani =

Indian LGBTIQ+ activist

- Occupation: LGBTQ rights activist
- Website: sonalgiani.com

Sonal Giani is an Indian LGBTQ activist and actress. Known for her advocacy and youth work, she focuses on the social impact of India's anti-LGBTQ law, Section 377. She is the co-founder of LGBTQ youth initiatives Yaariyan and Umangin.

== Early life ==
Giani grew up in Goa, India and has a twin sister. She came out to first her mother, followed by her father after the Delhi High Court judgement which struck down Section 377. At age 19, she was outed without her consent, leading to feelings of depression. She describes facing backlash, including sexual harassment and finding graffiti aimed at her in washrooms.

== Personal life ==
In 2013, Giani appeared in the reality television show Connected Hum Tum. The program followed Giani for over a year, documenting her life and her relationship with her female partner at the time. Giani also discussed her bisexuality on the show.

== Career and activism ==
Giani worked as an advocacy manager at the Humsafar Trust, a nonprofit that works to improve LGBTQ rights. She cites this job as helping herself heal and "dream of a bias-free, equal world". In her role, Giani provided assistance to people facing blackmail or extortion under Indian law based on their sexuality.

The root of this widespread discrimination and marginalization against LBT individuals is not because of hatred amongst society but because of their utter ignorance towards it.

— Sonal Giani

Giani is a co-founder of Yaariyan and Umang, two LGBTQ youth groups in Mumbai. In 2023, she became the delegate for Asia and the Pacific on the UNAIDS Programme Coordinating Board. She also works at International Planned Parenthood Federation as a senior advisor.

Giani considers same-sex marriage a "distant dream" in India, and the lack of this right as a cause of discrimination against LGBTQ people. She cites the need to educate others to address these root causes, both in terms of sex education and better understanding of LGBTQ individuals.

== See also ==
- LGBTQ rights in India
