= 3 A.M. (2014 film) =

- Theatrical release poster
- Directed by: Vishal Mahadkar
- Written by: Vishal Mahadkar
- Produced by: Handprint Pictures and Essel Vision Productions Ltd
- Starring: Rannvijay Singh; Anindita Nayar; Salil Acharya; Kavin Dave
- Release date: 26 September 2014
- Country: India
- Language: Hindi

3 A.M. is a 2014 Indian Hindi-language horror film directed by Vishal Mahadkar, starring Rannvijay Singh, Anindita Nayar, Salil Acharya and Kavin Dave. The film was released on 26 September 2014.

== Plot ==
The movie starts with a few students trespassing into a haunted place called "Rudra Mills," where they are stopped by Sunny from going further into the premises. Sunny then starts narrating his story to them. He starts by speaking about his fiancée Sarah, who used to do programmes on haunted places, and while once she was unable to find her Bhagwad Gita, she unwillingly had to leave for her shoot without it. At around midnight, Sunny woke up to see Sarah crying, and on being asked what happened, Sarah said, "I am sorry" before vanishing away. While confused, Sunny receives a call from police informing him about Sarah's death, who was found hanged from the walls of Rudra Mills - deemed a haunted place.

After this, sometime later, Sunny proposes a show to his producer for permission to shoot a documentary on paranormal activities in order to prove the existence of ghosts. The producer approves of the program, and Sunny chooses Rudra Mills as the site for the first shoot. Raj and Cyrus, his friends, accompany him as well, both sad over the death of Sarah. They both set cameras at different places and are successful in finding very powerful paranormal activity. They experience scary activities around them by the very night at different spots. At 3 a.m., Cyrus is possessed by the powerful demonic spirit of Rudra Pratap Singh, the owner of Rudra Mills. He chases after the two and separates them, after which he kills Raj in some sort of ritual. Sunny, enraged by Raj's death, taunts Rudra Pratap to face him. They battle each other, and Sunny is able to defeat him, mortally wounding himself in the process. He goes outside bleeding and reaches for the main gate, which is locked. He lies down for some time to rest and sees the officials coming in. He goes after them, but neither can they see him nor hear him. While repeatedly asking them for help, he passes right through them and sees himself lying dead beneath a tree. Story is concluded by Sunny to college students. Finally, the fact that Sunny was dead all the time after that fight against the evil spirit of Rudra Pratap Singh and that his spirit was narrating the story to the students is revealed.

They don't believe that he is dead. He eventually tells them to leave the premises for their safety and reunites with his wife, "who was dead." The students are left shocked as they both disappear, proving that the paranormal really does exist...

The movie ends on a note: "The End (Is just a Beginning)".

== Cast ==
- Rannvijay Singh as Sunny
- Anindita Nayar as Sarah
- Salil Acharya as Cyrus
- Kavin Dave as Raj
- Aditya Singh Rajput as Arjun

== Music ==
The music of the film was composed by Mannan, Raeth band, Bruno and Pranay Rijia.

3AM Soundtrack
No.	Title	Lyrics	Music	Singer(s)	Length
1.	"Raeth Ki Tarah"	Manan	Manan	Rajat	4:44
2.	"Teri Adaaon Mein"	Pranay Rijia	Pranay Rijia	Mustafa Zahid	4:29
3.	"Meherbaan"		Manan	Rajat	4:46
4.	"Sab Bhulake"		Manan	Wajhi	4:54
5.	"Tera Shukriya"		Manan	Wajhi (Raeth Band)	4:26
6.	"Teri Adaaon Mein" (Remix)		Ribin Richard	Mustafa Zahid	3:22
7.	"Tera Shukriya" (Remix)		Ribin Richard	Wajhi	4:00

== Reception ==
India TV gave the film 3 out 5 stars, writing "The film is a sharp slick scare-fest. It delivers the fear quotient without resorting to cheap gimmicks or excessive gore."

Kaushani Banerjee in her negative review for Deccan Chronicle stated "Although the film has a few good songs to its credit, but the force injection of commercial factors and resorting to Bollywood’s ideas of horror movies, makes '3AM' another mediocre attempt. You can watch '3AM' but there is nothing new, nothing great or nothing specific to recommend it for." Tushar Joshi in his two star review for DNA stated "If you can settle for an average supernatural thriller then 3 A.M. won't disappoint you."
