= Bangalore Institute of Technology =

Engineering college in Bangalore, India

- Motto: Technology For Prosperity
- Type: Private
- Established: 1979; 47 years ago
- Affiliations: Visvesvaraya Technological University
- Principal: Sharan
- Academic staff: 280
- Students: 5000
- Location: KR Road, VV Pura, Bangalore-560004, Bangalore, Karnataka, India; 12°57′18.61″N 77°34′27.45″E
- Campus: Urban
- Approvals: AICTE
- Website: bit-bangalore.edu.in

Bangalore Institute of Technology is an Autonomous Engineering college offering Undergraduate and Postgraduate Engineering courses, Management Courses affiliated to the Visvesvaraya Technological University, Belagavi located in Bangalore. The institution came into being in August, 1979 under the auspices of Rajya Vokkaligara Sangha, Bengaluru.

== Overview ==
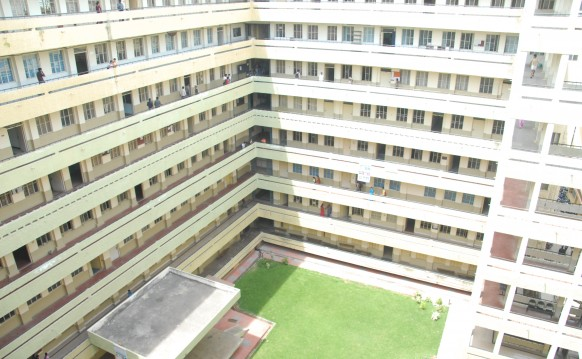
Bangalore Institute of Technology

BIT is currently affiliated to VTU. The institute offers Bachelor of Engineering degrees in Artificial Intelligence & Machine Learning, Computer Science, Electronics, Telecommunication, Instrumentation Technology, Electrical, Civil and Mechanical, Information Science and Engineering, Industrial Engineering and Management. It is recognized by the AICTE and NBA. BIT offers 10 undergraduate, 10 post graduate including MBA & MCA and PhD courses.

There are a number of centres carrying out inter-disciplinary research and collaborative programmes exist between the college and the Institute of Science (IISc) and National Aerospace Laboratories (N.A.L.).

== Placements ==
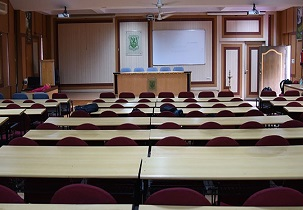
BIT Placement Cell

Students of BIT have academic records and are placed in well known industries and corporate sectors. The college offers placement on campus for its students. Companies which have visited the college for campus placements are Oracle, Bosch, Dell, Fidelity, IBM, London Stock Exchange Group (LSEG), Microchip, Accenture, TCE, L&T, ABB, Wipro, Tata Consultancy Services (TCS), Infosys, Quest, @WalmartLabs and HSBC. The graduates and postgraduate students of BIT are continuously trained on aptitude, technical and soft skills. Seminars, workshops and faculty development program are conducted on a regular basis to update the advances in the field of engineering. Student forums like Rotaract Club, TEDx, ECSA, IEEE, XKalibre, Shuttered, LEO club, and quiz club conduct various technical, cultural and sports events for faculty and students.

== Extracurricular activities ==
- TEDxBITBangalore is the annual TEDx event that takes place at Bangalore Institute of Technology and has seen prominent speakers like Prakash Belawadi, Roger Narayan, Sumukhi Suresh, Dr. Thimappa Hegde, and many others.
- EDC:BIT is the official Entrepreneurship and Development Cell of Bangalore Institute of Technology.
- BIT Team Stratos was formed in 2009 to participate in SAE BAJA India and other International events like SAE BAJA Korea.
- MANTHAN is the annual techno-cultural festival of BIT.
- INFINITI is a cell that was formed to encourage women in technology. Since its inception it has expanded to several colleges in Bangalore.
- MIDAS is a dance club of BIT, which participates in cultural events.
- DIMINISHED 7th is the official music club of BIT and a few members play in a Bangalore-based band called Seher.
- Associated with Rotary Bangalore South-East club to form Rotaract club in the college to inculcate a sense of concern for the society.
- BIT's cultural team 'AIKYA' is an ensemble of dance, music and drama.
- BIT's literary club "ELEVATE" encourages students to take part in literary events such as debate, creative writing and also conducts social awareness programs like clean drives and bikers clubs etc.
- BIT's Kannada Club "SAMSKRITHI" encourages students to learn and promote Kannada.
- The official Quiz club of BIT is called Crossfire Quizzing (CFQ for short ).
- Ecsa is electronic communication student association which regularly organize robotic workshop and seminars for students.
- BIT-Tech is a technical club which helps students from all the disciplines to make their technical ideas into projects and participate in different technical events across the country.
