= Rambo (2012 film) =

2012 Kannada film

- Theatrical release poster
- Directed by: M S Sreenath
- Written by: M S Sreenath
- Produced by: Atlanta Nagendra; Sharan
- Starring: Sharan; Madhuri Itagi; Sadhu Kokila; Rangayana Raghu
- Cinematography: Krishna
- Edited by: Prakash K M
- Music by: Arjun Janya; Additional Song: Ajay-Atul
- Production companies: Laddoo Cinema House; De Arte Studios
- Release date: 7 September 2012
- Country: India
- Language: Kannada
- Budget: ₹2 crores
- Box office: ₹5 crore (US$520,000)

Rambo is a 2012 Indian Kannada-language comedy thriller film written and directed by M S Sreenath. It was produced by Atlanta Nagendra and Sharan. Sharan and Madhuri Itagi played the leading roles. This is the 100th film of actor Sharan; it was released in September 2012. Arjun Janya is the music director for the film.

== Plot ==
Rambo is a film that revolves around a trickster, Kitty (Sharan). He has a mother in the house. He has a maternal uncle Premkumar (Tabla Naani) to his company. In a way it is Varahavatara from Kitty to his car brokerage business. He catches the sentiment in the society that any vehicle should not dash against a pig or vice versa. The superstitious belief is that it would smash your life further. No one is ready to take this risk in life.

Using the pig, Kitty was very cool in his set up to take the cars to custody for his business. In one of the cases a black colored car owned by Umesh is demanded by a Swamiji. The deal comes to Kitty and Premkumar. With this, further danger also follows the two. When they open the bonnet they find a dead body inside. This body is chased by a terrorist gang and the same car is also chased by former minister Annappa (Rangayana Raghu) as it has ₹25 crores in it.

Knowing about the death, Kitty wants to hand it over to the party who demanded it as he finds a murdered person. In the later course of time they find out that it belongs to a minister and the money inside makes them greedy. In such a situation Kitty wants to know why terrorists are behind that body in the trunk of the car. He scans the body and finds a pen drive tucked inside. That explains a terrorist gang is up to some major disturbance of peace.

Kitty comes straight to DC Vijayalakshmi (Shruthi) and becomes a good citizen by handing over everything to the government.

== Cast ==
- Sharan as Krishna Murthy alias Kitti
- Madhuri Itagi as Revathi
- Tabla Nani as Belt Kumar
- Sadhu Kokila as Dumil Krishna
- Rangayana Raghu as Mangalore Annappa
- Umashree
- Sanketh Kashi
- Shruti
- M. S. Umesh
- Dharma
- Rishi
- Venkatesh Prasad
- Chandan Aachar
- Shiva Manju
- Naveen Krishna (guest appearance) as Vatapi
- Kuri Prathap
- Naveen Shankar as Henchman (uncredited)

== Production ==
Rambo is the joint venture production of Atlanta Nagendra and Sharan. The movie was shot in 47 locations with super 35 mm camera for 55 days.

== Music ==
=== Soundtrack ===
Rambo

Soundtrack album by Arjun Janya, Ajay-Atul
- Released: 7 September 2012
- Genre: Feature film soundtrack
- Length: 25:31
- Label: Anand Audio

All the songs of the movie were screened in front of the media.

Rambo audio response has been appreciated for its catchy tunes and stylish presentation. Manethanka baare song made into the best songs of 2012 in Kannada. Rambo was one of the top Kannada albums of 2012 in CD sales and digital downloads.

No.	Title	Lyrics	Singer(s)	Length
1.	"Manethanka Baare"	V. Nagendra Prasad	Arjun Janya, Priya Himesh	3:57
2.	"Jaya Jaya Jackettu"	Kaviraj	Shankar Mahadevan	3:57
3.	"Kanna Muchche (composed by Ajay–Atul)"	Hrudaya Shiva	Vijay Prakash	5:24
4.	"Rambo Rambo"	V. Manohar	Naveen Madhav	4:13
5.	"Manethanka Baare"	V. Nagendra Prasad	Baba Sehgal	3:34
6.	"Pade Pade"	Ghouse Peer	Anuradha Bhat	4:26
Total length:				25:31

== Release ==
=== Theatrical ===
Rambo was released in all major centres all over USA Rambo was premiered in Australia.

== Reception ==
=== Box office ===
Rambo has taken a satisfactory opening. Rambo completes 25 days in 40 centres all over Karnataka. Rambo completes 50 days in major centers all over. Rambo makes it to the top 5 hits of 2012.

=== Critical response ===
Times of India gave 3 1/2 stars. Bangalore Mirror rated as 3 star. Indiaglitz reviewed Rambo as Brilliant. CNN IBN live rated Rambo as complete entertainer. NDTV rated the movie as a good entertainer enjoyable from start to finish. DNA India gave a rating of 70%. Chitratara mentioned it as worth watching cinema. Chitraloka mentioned forget the logic enjoy the magic. Super good movies rated it as good entertainer and gave 3 1/2 stars. One India entertainment rated Rambo as entertaining. Cine loka mentioned Rambo – An Unmissable Laugh Riot. Indian express rated Rambo as hilarious comedy. Bharatstudent mentioned it as different concept, entertaining narrative, watch it.

=== Accolades ===
Ceremony	Category	Nominee	Result
2nd South Indian International Movie Awards	Best Cinematographer	Krishna	Nominated
2nd South Indian International Movie Awards	Best Dance Choreographer	Imran Sardhariya	Nominated
2nd South Indian International Movie Awards	Best Male Playback Singer	Arjun Janya	Nominated
2nd South Indian International Movie Awards	Best Comedian	Tabala Nani	Nominated
2nd South Indian International Movie Awards	Best Male Debutant	Sharan	Nominated
2nd South Indian International Movie Awards	Best Debutant Director	M S Srinath	Nominated
2nd South Indian International Movie Awards	Best Debutant Producer	Atlanta Nagendra, Sharan	Nominated

Rambo was nominated for Udaya film awards 2013 in 4 categories.

Ceremony	Category	Nominee	Result
Udaya Film Awards	Best Playback Singer – Male	Arjun Janya	Nominated
Udaya Film Awards	Best Comedy – Male	Tabala Naani	Nominated
Udaya Film Awards	Best Debut – Male Actor	Sharan	Nominated
Udaya Film Awards	Best Music Director	Arjun Janya	Nominated

Rambo has been nominated for the Bangalore Times film awards 2012.

Ceremony	Category	Nominee	Result
Bangalore Times film awards 2012	Best Lyrics 2012	Nagendra Prasad	Nominated
Bangalore Times film awards 2012	Best Actor in Comic role 2012	Tabala Naani	Nominated
Bangalore Times film awards 2012	Best Actor in Comic role 2012	Sharan	Won

Rambo has been nominated for the 60th Idea filmfare awards 2013.

Ceremony	Category	Nominee	Result
60th Filmfare Awards South	Best Lyrics 2013	Nagendra Prasad	Nominated

Rambo has been nominated for the Santosham Film Awards 2013.

Ceremony	Category	Nominee	Result
Santosham Film Awards 2013	Best Comedian 2013	Tabala Nani	Won

Rambo has been nominated for ETV Kannada Sangeet Samman 2013 Awards in 4 categories.

Ceremony	Category	Nominee	Result
ETV Kannada Sangeet Samman 2013 awards	Best Singer Female	Anuradha Bhat	Nominated
ETV Kannada Sangeet Samman 2013 awards	Best Music Director	Arjun Janya	Nominated
ETV Kannada Sangeet Samman 2013 awards	Best Album of the year	Arjun Janya	Nominated
ETV Kannada Sangeet Samman 2013 awards	Best Lyricist	Hrudaya Shiva	Nominated
ETV Kannada Sangeet Samman 2013 awards	Best Lyricist	Ghouse Peer	Won

== Sequel ==
A sequel titled Raambo 2 was released in 2018.
