= Salil Acharya =

Indian actor (1980)

- Born: Salil Acharya; November 3, 1980 - Age (44); Delhi, India
- Occupations: Actor, VJ, RJ
- Years active: 2002–present

Salil Acharya is an Indian male actor, VJ, radio jockey and television host. Acharya made his Bollywood debut in Mohit Suri's 2007 film Awarapan. He is also a radio jockey for Radio City 91.1, a film critic for BBC Asian Network and a VJ at B4U. He is currently working for Sony Pictures Networks India where he is the host of WWE Sunday Dhamaal. He visited New Orleans to be a part of WrestleMania 34 and hosted a special program Namaste Wrestlemania which aired on Sony Ten.

== Social initiatives and image ==
Acharya has been involved in various community and social awareness initiatives through his platform at Radio City. In 2021, he supported the "Mission Green Mumbai" campaign, a partnership that collected over 41,000 mango seeds for distribution to rural farmers in Maharashtra. In November 2021, he co-hosted the "Chillar Party" event alongside colleagues, including RJ Palak, to mark Children's Day and promote youth engagement in Mumbai. He has frequently spoken on the role of radio in driving social change and hyperlocal cultural integration.

Beyond his broadcasting career, Acharya is recognized as a fitness enthusiast. His transition from a VJ to a fitness figure has been profiled by several media outlets, focusing on his lifestyle and health advocacy within the entertainment industry.

== Filmography ==
Year	Title	Role	Other notes
2007	Awarapan	Ronnie	Nominated, Stardust Best Male Debut Award
2013	Aashiqui 2	Aryan	
2014	3AM	Cyrus	

== TV ==
Year	Title	Role	Other notes
2016–present	WWE Sunday Dhamaal	Host	
2008	Kaun Jeetega Bollywood Ka Ticket	Host	
2007	Kyunki Saas Bhi Kabhi Bahu Thi	Billy Thakral	Special appearance
2006	Kasturi	Nikhil	
2006	Kituu Sabb Jaantii Hai		Parallel lead
2006	Kkavyanjali	Sandeep	
2005	Kasautii Zindagii Kay	Prem (Fake) / Rahul	
2005	Jeena Isi Ka Naam Hai		
2004	Ye Meri Life Hai	Kushaan	Main role
2004	Shararat	The Prince	1 episode
