= Nanna Preethiya Hudugi =

2001 film by Nagathihalli Chandrashekhar

- Official VCD cover
- Directed by: Nagathihalli Chandrashekar
- Written by: Nagathihalli Chandrashekar
- Produced by: Jyothi Shankar; Uma Shankar
- Starring: Dhyan; Deepali
- Cinematography: P. Rajan (USA); Mike Kelly (Auto show); Umapathi (India)
- Edited by: Basavaraj Urs
- Music by: Mano Murthy
- Production company: East West Creations India (Pvt) Ltd
- Release date: 6 April 2001
- Running time: 154 minutes
- Country: India
- Language: Kannada

Nanna Preethiya Hudugi (transl. The Girl I Love) is a 2001 Indian Kannada-language romance film directed and written by Nagathihalli Chandrashekar. It stars newcomers Dhyan and Deepali in lead roles and actors such as Lokesh, Bhavya and Suresh Heblikar in other prominent roles. The film is produced by Jyothi Shankar and Uma Shankar for East West Creations India (Pvt) Ltd.

The story is based on Chandrashekar's own decade-old short story "Malenada Hudugi, Bayaluseeme Huduga". The film was reviewed as average by the critics, and it was declared a musical hit at the box-office. It went on to win an award at the Filmfare Awards for 2001.

== Plot ==
Puttu is a village boy from Basarikatte. He lives with his parents- Madve Manjaiah and Seeta, paternal aunt and her daughter Gauri. Puttu is not serious about his studies and rather enjoys cycling, swimming and other fun activities. One day Puttu's new teacher finds out Puttu's exceptional skill in playing the flute. He manages to get a year's schooling for Puttu in America under a cultural exchange program. The whole village is happy for Puttu and they all bid him goodbye.

In America, Puttu is under the care of Susan who shows him immense love and support. Puttu meets Chinnu (Sheena), born to an Indian expatriate couple in his new American school. After initial confusion and misunderstandings, Puttu and Chinnu become good friends. Chinnu helps Puttu adapt to the American culture and lifestyle. As their friendship thickens, Chinnu and Puttu begin to exchange their belongings. Chinnu's parents object to this, making her rebel against them. Eventually Puttu and Chinnu fall for each other.

Now that Puttu has lived in America, which none in Basarikatte had accomplished so far, his paternal aunt decides to get her daughter married to Puttu. In the name of Seeta's illness, both his paternal aunt and father convince Puttu to marry Gauri. Puttu is now in a helpless situation in his village. Back in America, Chinnu has had a fight with her parents who take away all of her allowances and other facilities.

After a few days of separation, Chinnu learns that Puttu's marriage is being fixed. In order to get back Puttu's love, Chinnu escapes her parents' confinement and flees to Basarikatte. Meanwhile in India, Puttu learns that Seeta never had the idea of getting Puttu married to Gauri. She reveals that it was all the conspiracy of Puttu's aunt. His mother urges him to reunite with Chinnu as soon as possible. In the end, Gauri stops Puttu from boarding the flight to America as she knew that Chinnu was coming to meet him. Thus Gauri reunites Puttu and Chinnu. Gauri tells the couple that she could not have a happy life with Puttu as he never had any feelings for her in the first place and that Puttu always loved Chinnu.

== Cast ==
- Dhyan as Puttu
- Deepali as Chinnu
- Lokesh as Maduve Manjaih
- Bhavya as Seetha
- Karen Vasudev as Susan
- Suresh Heblikar as Chinnu's father
- Vijayalakshmi Singh as Chinnu's mother
- Richard Louis as postman
- Chitra Shenoy as Puttu's aunt
- Nagathihalli Chandrashekar as a teacher (guest appearance)

=== Voice-overs ===
- Rajesh Krishnan for Dhyan
- Nanditha for Deepali

== Production ==
After the stupendous success of Nagathihalli Chandrashekar's previous venture, America America (1995) which was shot entirely in the United States, he came up with another campus romantic story set at Michigan State University.

For this, he went on a rigorous schedule for casting the leading actors. He conducted a walk-in interview in Bangalore for which over 1,000 candidates appeared and 10 were shortlisted. None of them cleared the screen test. He then conducted the same in Mumbai where he shortlisted Sameer Dattani, a model who had previously appeared in a few advertisements and music videos. He later shortlisted the female lead Deepa, a Bangalore-based girl who was settled in California, online and a subsequent screen test. Playback singers Rajesh Krishnan and Nanditha were roped in to do the voice-overs for the lead actors.

Mano Murthy was chosen by Chandrashekar to score for the film. They met in the US in December 1999 when the latter first narrated the story to the latter. Chandrashekhar upon returning to India made another trip to the US, and shot some videos of cars in Detroit before showing it to Murthy, and asked him to compose a tune to it. After the latter "made a very simple tune", Chandrashekhar wrote "Car Car", the lyrics to it, following which Murthy set them to the tune. Most of the filming was held on the Michigan State University campus; the water sport sequence was shot from white water rafting in West Virginia.

== Soundtrack ==
The music was composed by Mano Murthy to the lyrics of Nagathihalli Chandrashekar. The song "Car Car Ellnodi Car" and "Moodal Kunigal Kere" became hit songs and the former ruled the audio charts for many months.

Nanna Preethiya Hudugi

Soundtrack album by Mano Murthy
- Released: 2001
- Genre: Feature film soundtrack
- Label: Akash Audio

No.	Title	Lyrics	Singer(s)	Length
1.	"Moodal Kunigal Kere"	Nagathihalli Chandrashekar	Ram Prasad, Nanditha
2.	"Car Car Car"	Nagathihalli Chandrashekar	Suresh Peters, B. Jayashree
3.	"Baa Baaro"	Nagathihalli Chandrashekar	Rajesh Krishnan, Anuradha Paudwal
4.	"Yaaro Neenu"	Nagathihalli Chandrashekar	Hariharan, Anuradha Paudwal
5.	"Adeke Kothi Moothi"	Nagathihalli Chandrashekar	Rajesh Krishnan, Sangeetha Katti
6.	"Nanna Preethiya Hudugi"	Shashikala Chandrashekar	Hariharan, Anuradha Paudwal

== Release ==
A critic from indiainfo wrote that "The film starts with a bright note but somehow lacks consistency" and added that "But the acting of both Dyan and Deepali is worth mentioning".

The film completed a 175-day run in Karnataka across many cinema halls. In late 2001 and 2002, this was internationally released by T.M.S. International with English subtitles and the English title My Favorite Girl.

== Awards ==
- 49th Filmfare Awards South
1. Filmfare Award for Best Director - Kannada - Nagathihalli Chandrashekar

== External source ==
- Nanna Preethiya Hudugi at IMDb
- Songs
- Nagathihalli Chandrashekhar
