= Vishal Mahadkar =

Indian film director (born 1978)

Vishal S. Mahadakar (born 30 November 1978) is a film director in the Indian Film Industry. After having worked on several films at Vishesh Films, Vishal was conferred a directorial debut by the Bhatt's in their film Blood Money, which starred Kunal Kemmu and Amrita Puri.

After Blood Money, Vishal then wrote and directed 3AM, starring Rannvijay Singh and Anindita Nayar.

== Early life and education ==
=== Royal connections to Shivaji ===
Vishal, direct descendant of Murarbaji Deshpande, the legendary General of Shivaji was born and raised at Pali Hill, Mumbai, home to the Top Guns of the Indian Film Industry, it was but only a matter of time, that, films would finally have the better of Vishal and become an integral part of his life.

=== Schooling in Mumbai and England ===
Vishal's father, Capt. Shivaji Mahadkar (an Ex Army Officer and later a businessman) had enrolled him in the renowned Bombay Scottish School, Mahim, Mumbai. However, it was at the behest of Vishal's grandfather, Late Col. Dattatraya Mahadkar who sent Vishal to Oxford, England to study in the elite Dragon School, a top Prep School in Oxford, which saw future global leaders from all spheres of life, pass through its portals. Vishal left Bombay Scottish School, Mahim at the age of 8 and moved to Oxford.

=== Elite schooling in India ===
Having completed the "O levels" at Oxford, he returned to India to study further in Sherwood College, Nainital, where other Bollywood luminaries like Amitabh Bachchan, Kabir Bedi and Dalip Tahil were groomed. Since, Vishal had spent his formative years away from home, overseas, Vishal's father sent him for a year to Shahu Vidyalaya in the precincts of the Kolhapur Palace, to learn and study the rich heritage that he belonged to, under the personal tutelage and the watchful eyes of Shahu, the current heir to the throne of Shivaji. It was at the Kolhapur Palace that Vishal was introduced to the true Indian culture, arts and craft and literally lived through history.

=== Higher studies in Mumbai and Australia ===
Vishal went on to study further in institutions like Mithibai College, Mumbai and Swinburne University of Technology, Melbourne, Australia where he studied Business Administration.

== Film career ==
=== From IT entrepreneur to movies ===
On return to India in 1999, Vishal, under the guidance of his father, initiated his own Information technology business. He founded 'Mahadkar Infotech' and started a Multi Media Training Centre, which in addition to training, took on, Multi Media, Web Related and other Projects including software development. Vishal enjoyed the creative aspect of the business and personally spearheaded all projects executed by the company. Here, he was exposed to technologies involved in film making such as CGI, VFX and editing. Being an avid film buff, Vishal's interest in filmmaking was gradually evolving. Destiny takes its own course! Vishal's Information technology business had started taking on water post the IT meltdown in 2001. It was, after a great deal of deliberation, that, despite the risk of delving into a completely alien career, Vishal decided to give an expression to his latent passion and wound up his Information technology operations in 2003!

=== Associate director and script writer ===
Vishal joined Mohit Suri's direction team on Kalyug (2005 film) as a junior Assistant Director, and spent time closely learning the craft with Kunal Deshmukh, who was also on the team. Vishal was then pushed up to First Assistant Director on film Woh Lamhe starring Kangana Ranaut and Shiney Ahuja. Vishal was now being monitored closely by the Bhatt brothers as he was then promoted to Chief Assistant Director in film "Awarapan", starring Emraan Hashmi. It was during Awarapan that Vishal got to spend a lot of time with mentor Mahesh Bhatt. Seeing a potential director in him, the Bhatts then promoted Vishal to Associate Director in film Raaz 2 Starring Emraan Hashmi and Kangana Ranaut. During this period, Vishal was not only being groomed, but tested as well, being asked to take over troubled projects to handle. Vishal passed with flying colors and was on his way to becoming a Film director.

=== Break as a film director ===
Vishal started bouncing projects off the Bhatts and also wrote a number of scripts. However it was in 2011 that they finally saw potential in one of his story ideas involving the diamond mafia. They green lit the idea and Vishal hired award-winning writer Upendra Sidhaye to pen this idea into a script. This script was later titled Blood Money and Kunal Kemmu and Amrita Puri were hired to star in Vishal's debut film.

Vishal made "Blood Money" in 42 shooting days, and two months of postproduction. Mahesh Bhatt, impressed by Vishal's work, often took to Twitter to praise Vishal with remarks such as: "our brilliant new director", etc. Blood Money released on 30 March 2012 and was declared a hit in the box office in its 1st week itself, collecting about 11crores net in week 1.

Vishal then went on to direct 3AM, a supernatural thriller, that dealt with the paranormal and got one to ask themselves the age-old question - is there life beyond death? 3AM, starring Rannvijay Singh and Anindita Nayar went on to be considered by many as a path breaking, new age film, in the Indian horror film genre. The film was shot in 29 days, in Mumbai and Goa. The film also stars Salil Acharaya as friend turned (possessed) foe, and Kavin Dave.

With 3AM, Vishal made his debut as a producer, co-producing the film, apart from having written and directed it.

== Filmography ==
- Blood Money (2012)
- 3AM (2014)
