= Babloo Happy Hai =

- Directed by: Nila Madhab Panda
- Written by: Sanjay Chauhan & Deepak Venkateshan
- Produced by: Gagan Dhawan; Ravi Dutta; Narendra Singh
- Starring: Sahil Anand; Erica Fernandes; Sumit Suri; Reyhna Malhotra; Amol Parashar; Preet Kamal; Anu Choudhury; Parvin Dabas
- Cinematography: Subhransu Das
- Edited by: Birenjyoti Mohanty
- Music by: Bishakh-Kanish
- Release date: 7 February 2014
- Country: India
- Language: Hindi

Babloo Happy Hai (transl. Babloo is happy) is a 2014 Indian Hindi-language film directed by Nila Madhab Panda, who earlier directed I am Kalam and Jalpari. It is a love story of today's youngsters, and what they think love and sex are in the times of multiplexes and fast cars. The film features Sahil Anand, Erica Fernandes, Sumit Suri, Amol Parashar, Preet Kamal, Anu Choudhury, Reyhna Malhotra and Parvin Dabas in pivotal roles. The film's name was originally Love is not mathematics. The film was released on 7 February 2014, along with three other Bollywood films - Hasee Toh Phasee, Heartless, and Ya Rab.

== Plot ==
"Babloo Happy Hai" follows the story of three urban young men – Babloo, Sam, and Tariq – who are close friends and decide to go on a road trip to Manali to attend a friend's wedding. The film starts with a fun and carefree tone, highlighting their modern lifestyles, casual relationships, and a party-loving attitude.

However, the story takes a deeper turn when Babloo meets Natasha, a mysterious and free-spirited girl. Through their interactions, Babloo learns that Natasha is dealing with a personal crisis – she is HIV positive. This revelation serves as a wake-up call for Babloo and his friends, who begin to reflect on their own lives, relationships, and responsibilities.

== Cast ==
- Sahil Anand as Jatin
- Erica Fernandes as Natasha
- Parvin Dabas as Harsh
- Sumit Suri as Harry
- Amol Parashar as Rohan
- Preet Kamal as Tamanna
- Anu Choudhury as Deepa
- Reyhna Malhotra as Gazala
- Gulzar Khan
- Amit Rana

== Soundtrack ==
The soundtrack was composed by Bishakh Jyoti &Kanish with lyrics by Protique Mojoomdar.

Tracklist
No.	Title	Lyrics	Singer(s)	Length
1.	"Babloo Happy Hai"	Protique Mojoomdar	Hard Kaur
2.	"Banjaran"	Protique Mojoomdar	Sonu Kakkar, Rahul Ram
3.	"Jimmy Bhand"	Protique Mojoomdar	Mika Singh, Payal Dev
4.	"Bade Bade Akshar"	Protique Mojoomdar	Bishakh Jyoti, Sniti Mishra
5.	"Nachtey Raho"	Protique Mojoomdar	Kanish Sharma, Tanya Gupta
6.	"Popcorn"	Protique Mojoomdar	Aditi Singh Sharma, Protique Mojoomdar
7.	"Uhe Baatiyan"	Protique Mojoomdar	Shankar Mahadevan

== Critical reception ==
The film received mixed reviews. Taran Adarsh of Bollywood Hungama gave it 1.5 stars. Renuka Vyavahare of Times of India gave the film 2 stars. Subhash K jha and Yahoo India News gave it 4 stars. MTV India gave it 3.5 stars. while India TV News gave it 4 stars.

== Awards and nominations ==
Award	Category	Recipients and nominees	Result	Ref.
7th Mirchi Music Awards	Raag-Inspired Song of the Year	"Uhe Batiyaan"	Nominated	

== See also ==
- Bollywood films of 2014
