= Kalira Atita =

Indian Film

Kalira Atita (Yesterday’s Past)
- Directed by: Nila Madhab Panda
- Produced by: Nila Madhab Panda
- Starring: Pitobash Tripathy
- Music by: Daniel B. George
- Release date: 6 November 2020
- Running time: 83 minutes
- Country: India
- Language: Odia

Kalira Atita is a 2020 Indian Odia-language family film directed by Nila Madhab Panda, who earlier directed I am Kalam and Jalpari. This movie talks about climate change and its repercussions. The director sent the film to the Academy Awards committee. The film won the National Film Award for Best Feature Film in Odia.

== Plot ==
Disillusioned Gunu, a young man from Satavaya village, travels relentlessly from the memories of a past cyclone into the eye of an upcoming one hoping to reunite with his lost family.

== Cast ==
- Pitobash Tripathy as Gunu

== Reception ==
A critic from Firstpost wrote that "In Nila Madhab Panda's National Award-winning Odia film, the lone actor Pitobash does his best to lend a human face to what is essentially an environmental documentary". A critic from Cinestaan said that "A fine blend of fiction and the documentation of the villages that have been submerged by the cyclones that routinely hit the Odisha coast, Kalira Atita gives us a glimpse of an impending doomsday scenario when humans, drunk on the ambition of taking civilization forward, will find survival increasingly difficult owing to the harrowing consequences of climate change".
