= Harsh Mayar =

Indian film and television actor

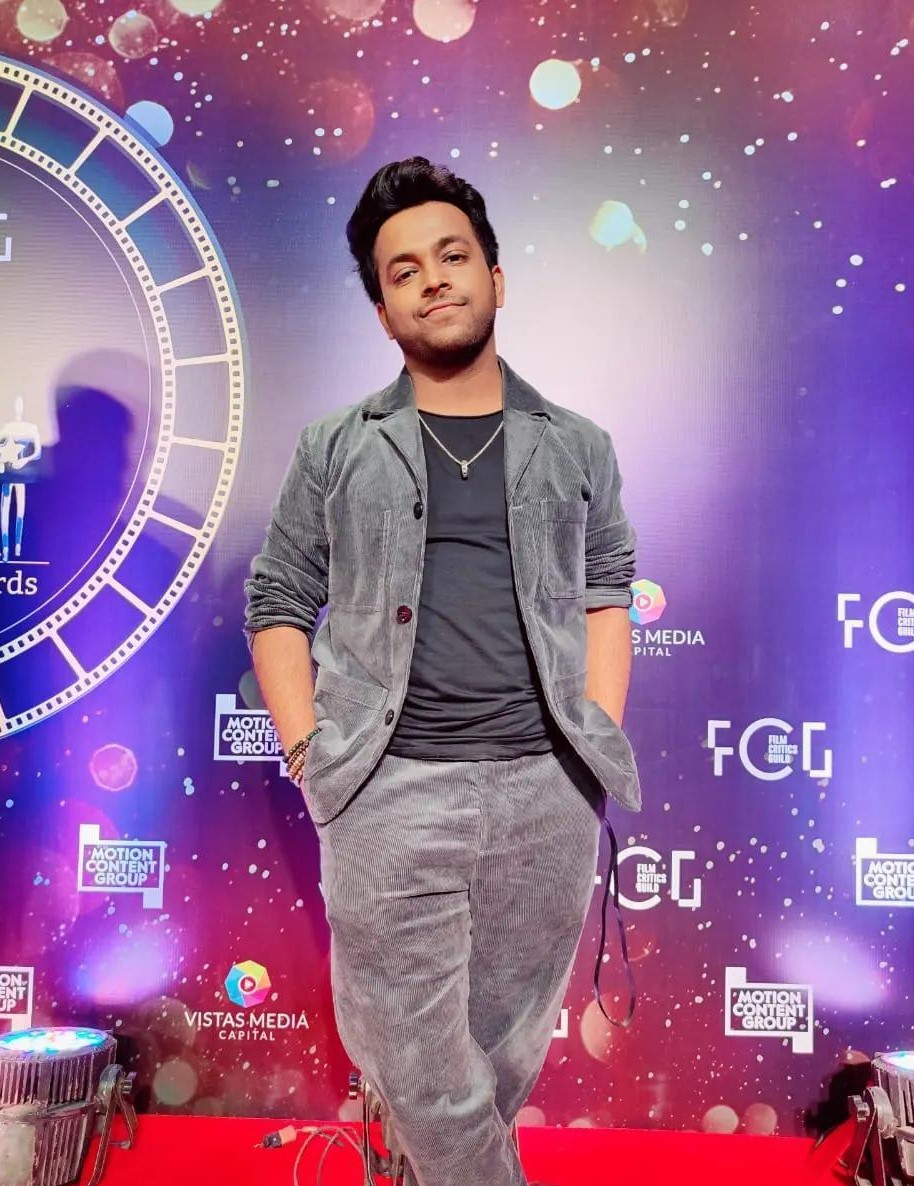
- Harsh Mayar at ccsa critics choice awards
- Born: Harsh Mayar; India
- Occupation: Actor
- Years active: 2011–present
- Spouse: Sukanya Rajan Mayar

Harsh Mayar is an Indian actor working in Hindi Bollywood films. He won the National Film Award for Best Child Artist for his work in 2011 film I Am Kalam.

== Career ==
Mayar started his career in 2005 when he was only eight years old. He joined Shri Ram Center in Delhi with the support of his uncle Sunil Kumar because his parents were not able to afford the fee of his acting classes. During that time, he played 5–6 stage shows. Afterwards he gave 180 auditions for singing, dancing and acting. He was selected for Chillar Party, but he did not match the role and decided not to work for the film because he had broken his right hand while playing. After a few months when he had recovered, he got a call for an audition. His parents convinced him for the audition and he was then selected for the film I Am Kalam. The film was shot in Rajasthan in 2009 and he worked with debuting director Nila Madhab Panda, with veteran actor Gulshan Grover and comic actor Pitobash Tripathy. I Am Kalam released on 5 August 2011. Mayar won many international awards for his performance in I Am Kalam. He also won the 58th National Film Award for the best child artist. His next film Jalpari: The Desert Mermaid released in 2012. He has worked in Chaarfutiya Chhokare (1 August 2014) with Soha Ali Khan, in a Bollywood thriller film, written and directed by Manish Harishankar The latest film of Harsh was Hichki, with Rani Mukerji.

== Musical theatre ==
Mayar was in the Hindi musical Paighamber, directed by Vikas Dwivedi, with Tom Alter and Amit Behl in lead roles. The play is inspired by the literary classic The Prophet , by Kahlil Gibran, and incorporates folk music of Chhattisgarh and Haryana and the Karma dance form of Chhattisgarh, along with live music and singing.

== Television ==
Harsh appeared as lead in DD National's - Aadha Full as Adrak. He started his television career from Channel V India crime series Gumrah: End of Innocence in 2014. After that he appeared in an episode of &TV crime show Tujhse Naaraz Nahin Zindagi in 2015.

== Short film ==
Mayar worked as lead in a student film project, Untitled - The Words Left Unsaid, directed by Sachin Aggarwal. It is an 8-minute short film in which Harsh is Nitin, is a 15-year-old schooboy who is alone in his home and write letters to his mother. The film was shot in the village of Makrauli village in the Rohtak District.

== Awards ==
=== National film awards ===
Winner

- 2010: Best Child Actor - I Am Kalam
- 2011: Best Child Actor In Bhagat Singh Bravery Award

Nominated

- 2012: Screen Award - I Am Kalam
- 2022: Filmfare OTT Awards - Best supporting Actor (Comedy)

=== International awards ===
Winner

- 2011: River Rock Award Best Actor in Silent River Film Festival, California -I Am Kalam
- 2011: Special Mention for Best Actor in International Children's Film Festival India, Heydrabad - I Am Kalam
- 2010: Best Actor in Minsk International Film Festival "Listapad"

== Filmography ==
Year	Film	Role	Notes
2011	I Am Kalam	Chotu Urf Kalam	58 National Film Awards - Best Child Actor
2012	Jalpari: The Desert Mermaid	Ajite	
2014	Chaarfutiya Chhokare	Awadesh	
2013	Desires Of The Heart	Nanu	English film
2014	Gumrah: End of Innocence	Bully	Channel V Serial
2014	Gram Post Bharat	Bheroo	Under Production
2015	Untitled - The Words Left Unsaid	Nitin	Short Film (Completed)
2018	Hichki	Aatish	Released on March 23, 2018
2019–Present	Gullak	Aman Mishra	Main cast, season 1-4
2019	Kanpuriye	Jugnu	Hotstar Specials Film
2019	Abhay (TV series)	Sujoy	ZEE5 Web Series
2020	Overtime	Manoj	Web Series
2023	The Tenant	Rocky	
2026	One Two Cha Cha Chaa	Lappu	
