= Sita Menon =

Indian scriptwriter

- Occupations: Scriptwriter, Screenplay Writer, Dialogue Writer
- Years active: 2011–present

Sita Menon is a former journalist and a film editor with Rediff.com, who started her writing career with directors Raj Nidimoru and Krishna DK.

== Early life ==
She was a daughter of a journalist who worked with The Economic Times and grew up around writers. She worked with Times of India, Femina, Star India and various other digital media before her collaboration with Raj & DK.

== Career ==
She has worked along with filmmakers Raj Nidimoru and Krishna DK, as their writing partner, creative producer and creative partner on various movies including their debut movie 99, starring Kunal Khemu, Boman Irani, Soha Ali Khan. Menon continued working with the duo, as a writer for Shor in the City, Go Goa Gone, Happy Ending and A Gentleman.

In 2024, Marvel announced that Menon along with Raj and DK are set to make their Hollywood debut and develop a Super hero script. She has earlier worked with Raj and DK in many projects including 99, Shor in the City, Citadel: Honey Bunny and Farzi. She is also involved in the writing of the Farzi 2.

She is also working on Reloaded with Jacqueline Fernandez playing the lead role.

== Filmography ==
=== Scriptwriter ===
Year	Show	Credit As	Notes
2009	99	Hindi Dialogue / Story and Screenplay / Creative Partner	
2010	Inkosaari	Story and Screenplay	
2011	Shor in the City	Dialogue / Story and Screenplay	
2013	Go Goa Gone	Dialogue / Story and Screenplay / Creative Producer	
2014	Happy Ending	Screenplay / Story	
2017	A Gentleman	Story	
2023	Farzi	Story and Screenplay	Amazon Prime Video
2023	Guns & Gulaabs	Story and Screenplay	Netflix series
2024	Citadel: Honey Bunny	Writer	Amazon Prime Series
TBA	Farzi 2	Story and Screenplay	Netflix series
