= Pitobash Tripathy =

Film actor

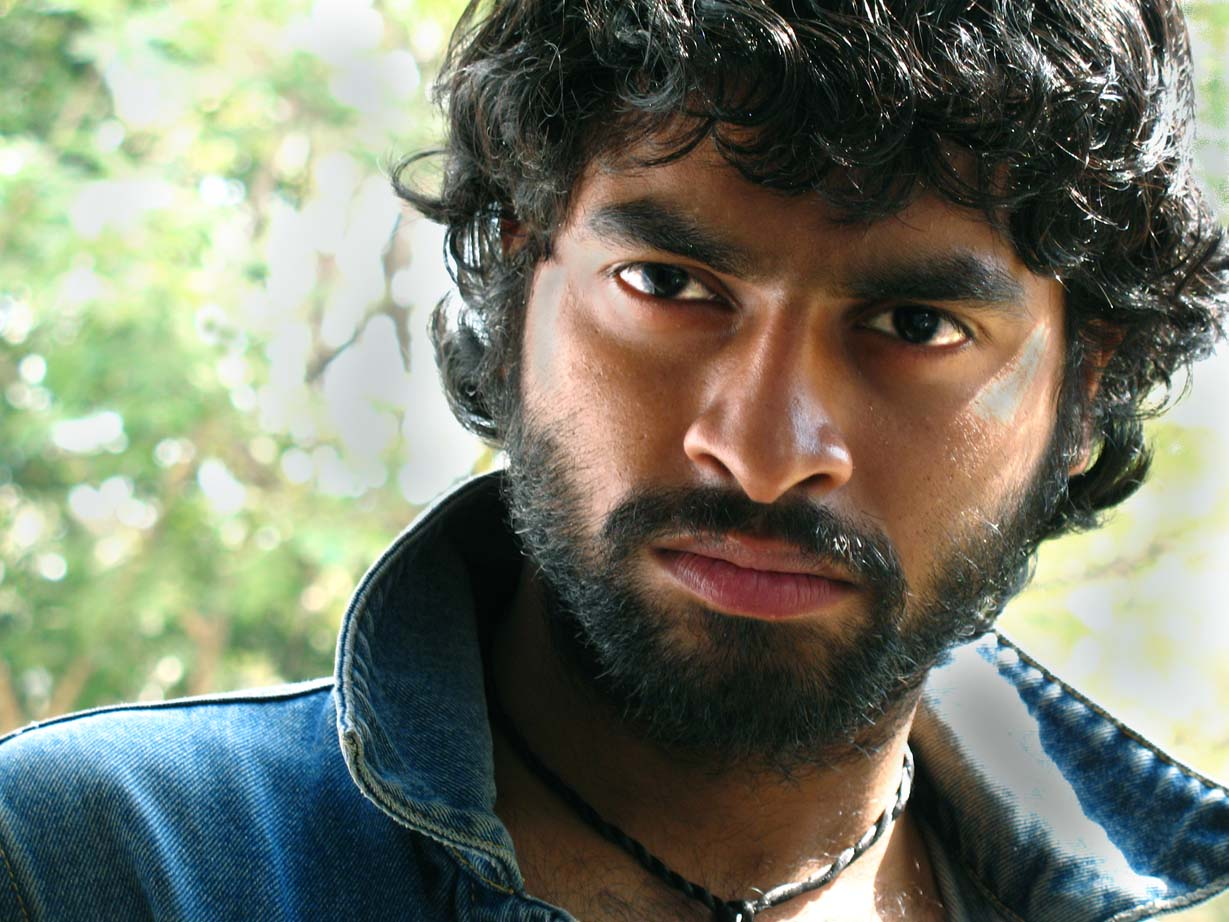
- Tripathy in 2013
- Born: 1984 (age 42); Nayagarh, Odisha, India
- Education: Government College of Engineering and Leather Technology, Kolkata; Film and Television Institute of India
- Occupation: Film actor
- Years active: 2008–present
- Known for: I Am Kalam; Begum Jaan; Shor in the City; Mom; Million Dollar Arm (Hollywood film)

Pitobash Tripathy (born 1984), also known simply as Pitobash, is an Indian actor who works in Bollywood films. He is known for his role in the movies I Am Kalam, Begum Jaan, Shor in the City, Mom, the Hollywood film Million Dollar Arm and the National Award-winning Odia film Kalira Atita.

== Early life and education ==
Tripathy was born in 1984 in Nayagarh, Odisha. He was brought up in Bhubaneswar where he completed his schooling from the Government High School, Unit 1, Bhubaneswar. Then, he joined Buxi Jagabandhu Bidyadhar College, Bhubaneswar for his higher secondary education. He completed a Bachelor of Technology degree in 2005 from the Government College of Engineering and Leather Technology from Kolkata, and he also holds a diploma in acting from the Film and Television Institute of India.

Tripathy was awarded with the National Bal Shree Honour from the President of India in the field of creative performance at the age of 12. He was also involved in theater in Kolkata. in 2007. Later on, he joined the Bollywood industry as an actor.

== Career ==
Tripathy started acting with the movie 99. He then appeared in a supporting role in 3 Idiots. Later, he acted in I Am Kalam, directed by Nila Madhab Panda, and Shor in the City. He also acted in the movie Mirch in five different roles. Additional appearances include the films Joker, Aalaap, Shanghai and Once Upon a Time in Mumbai Dobaara!.

== Filmography ==
Year	Title	Role	Notes
2009	99	Salesman	
2009	3 Idiots	Junior	
2010	Aida	Bounty hunter	Short film
2010	I Am Kalam	Laptan	
2010	Mirch	Madan/Chedimal	
2011	Shor in the City	Mandook	Won Screen Award for Best Comedian
2012	Shanghai	Bhagirath Dolas alias Bhaggu	
2012	Joker	Kachua (Alien)	
2012	Aalaap	Subhash	
2013	Go Goa Gone	Red Drug Handler	
2013	Once Upon a Time in Mumbai Dobaara	Derd Tang	
2014	Million Dollar Arm	Amit Rohan	English film
2017	Begum Jaan	Surjeet	
2017	Mom	Gateman Babu Raam Pandey	
2017	An Indian Tale	The Indian	French film
2019	Total Dhamaal	Jhingur	
2020	French Biriyani	Suleiman	Kannada film
2021	Kalira Atita	Gunnu	Odia film
2024	Monkey Man	Alphonso	English film

== Web series ==
Year	Title	Role	Platform	Notes
2018	Table No 5		ZEE5	
2019–present	Metro Park	Bittu	Eros Now	
2022	Dr. Arora	Singhada	SonyLIV	

== Awards and honors ==
=== Odisha Youth Inspiration Award – 2012 ===
- 2012 – Odisha Youth Inspiration Award

=== Screen Awards ===
Winner:

- 2012 – Screen Best Actor in a Comic Role Award for Shor in the City

Nominated:

- 2012 – Screen Promising Newcomer Of The Year for Shor in the City

=== Filmfare Awards ===
Nominated:

- 2012 – Filmfare Best Supporting Actor Award for Shor in the City

=== Stardust Awards ===
Nominated:

- 2012 – Stardust Best Actor Award for Shor in the City

=== Global Indian Film and Television Honours ===
Nominated:

- 2012 – GIFTH Best Actor In A Supporting Role Award for Shor in the City

=== Other awards ===
- 1996: National Bal Shree Honour – from President of India, Dr. Shankar Dayal Sharma in Creative Performance
