= Hello Friends (TV series) =

- Directed by: Ajit Pal
- Starring: see below
- Opening theme: "Hello Friends"
- Country of origin: India
- Original language: Hindi
- No. of episodes: 26

Production
- Producer: Sunil Pal
- Running time: approx. 18 minutes
- Production company: Headline Entertainment

Original release
- Network: Zee TV
- Release: 6 September 1999 – 28 February 2000

Hello Friends is a Hindi language sitcom that premiered on Zee TV channel on 6 September 1999. The series is an Indian adaptation of the American sitcom Friends. It ran for one season of 26 episodes.

== Premise ==
Hello Friends is a comedy about six lovable, humorous, fun-loving friends and their adventures and misadventures.

== Cast ==
- Simone Singh as Sanjana (Monica Geller)
- Aparna Tilak as Nisha (Rachel Green)
- Maria Goretti as Penny (Phoebe Buffay)
- Cyrus Broacha as Cyrus (Chandler Bing)
- Nikhil Chinapa as Vikram (Ross Geller) and Akram (in the last episode)
- Anil Dimbri as Rahul (Joey Tribbiani)
- Kunal Vijaykar as Uncle Sam
- Mandira Bedi as Julie
- Jyoti Gauba
- Kishwer Merchant
- Shehzad Khan
- Bhavana Balsavar as Konika
- Eva Grover as Priya
- Rituraj Singh as Amit
- Samir Soni as Samir
