= Master Saleem =

Indian playback singer

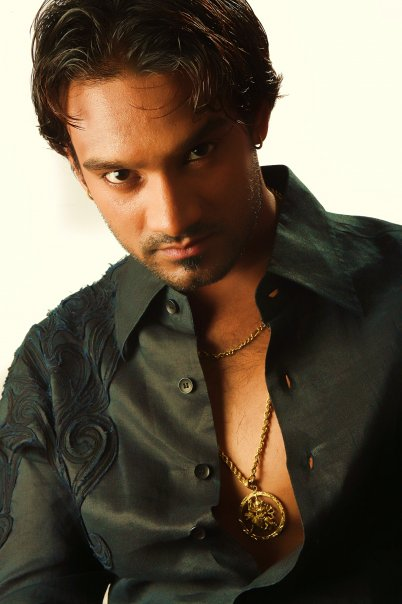
- Saleem in 2009
- Born: Shahkot, Punjab, India
- Occupation: Singer
- Years active: 1990–present
- Spouse: Anmol Alisha Saleem (m. 2014)
- Musical career
- Genres: Romantic; Bhangra; religious; Sufi music; Classical music
- Instruments: Vocals

Saleem Shahzada, also known as Master Saleem, is an Indian singer who is known for his work as a Punjabi singer and contributions to Punjabi music.

== Early life and training ==
Saleem Shahzada is the son of singer Ustad Puran Shah Koti, who began training him as a singer at the age of six.

== Career ==
At the age of seven, he gave his first public performance at the opening ceremony of Bathinda Doordarshan (TV station), with his song, Charkhe Di Ghook, and thus earned the name Master Saleem. Soon he started appearing on TV shows like, Jhilmil Taare.

Saleem's first album, Charkhe Di Ghook, was released when he was 10 years old. It was released on the label Sur Taal, created by his father's friend, Manjinder Singh Goli, and went on to become a hit. This led to several Punjabi music and religious albums and live shows. His song Dhol Jagiro Da also became a huge hit and giving him wide popularity. In the late 1990s, however as he was growing his voice started changing, which lessened his popularity. He made his comeback in 2000, with the Sufi number Aj Hona Deedar Mahi da, which he sang at a New Year's programme at Doordarshan channel, and later released albums dedicated to Goddess Durga including, Mela Maiya Da (2004), Aj Hai Jagrata, Meri Maiya and Darshan Kar Lao.

Around 2005, singer Jasbir Jassi introduced him to music director Sandeep Chowta, who subsequently called him to Delhi to record single Sajni in Sony Music album Teri Sajni.

Eventually Shankar Mahadevan, of the music trio Shankar–Ehsaan–Loy, heard his performances at a jagaran at the Devi Talaab Mandir, Jalandhar, being aired on a religious TV channel, and thus Saleem made his debut as playback singer with single "Mast Kalandar" from the film Heyy Babyy (2007) under their music direction. The song was a hit and launched his Bollywood career. This was followed by most well-known singles including "Tashan Mein" from the film Tashan and Maa Da Ladla from the film Dostana (2008), and Aahun Aahun in Love Aaj Kal (2009). and in 2010 some of his hit songs have been "Humka Peeni Hai" from "Dabangg and "Shakira" in "No Problem and "Chamki Jawani" in Yamla Pagla Deewana. In 2011, one of his first hits was "Rola Pe Gaya" in Patiala House.

== Television ==
Year	Show	Role	Channel
2021	Zee Punjabi Antakshari	Host and Judge	Zee Punjabi

== Filmography ==
Roles	Film	Language	Songs Recorded
1996	Tabahi	Punjabi	Devotional duet with Master Khan- Do badiyan keemti zindan
2000	Mehndi Wale Hath	Punjabi	Pardesi; Naina
2007	Delhii Heights	Hindi	Aaja Nachle
2007	Heyy Babyy	Hindi	Mast Kalandar
2008	Tashan	Hindi	Tashan Mein
2008	Chamku	Hindi	Trance
2008	Money Hai Toh Honey Hai	Hindi	Rangeeli Raat
2008	Dostana	Hindi	Maa Da Ladla
2009	Mini Punjab	Punjabi	Rabb Dilaan De
2009	Love Aaj Kal	Hindi	Aahun Aahun; Aahun Aahun (Remix)
2009	Punnyan Di Raat	Punjabi	Cham Cham Chamke
2009	Tere Sang	Hindi	Leja Leja
2009	Ruslaan	Hindi	Maula Maula; Maula Maula (Remix)
2009	Dil Bole Hadippa!	Hindi	Discowale Khisko (Remix)
2010	Ladd Gaye Peche	Punjabi	Oh ye...Oh ye..
2010	Chance Pe Dance	Hindi	Pe..Pe..Pepein; Pe..Pe..Pepein (Remix)
2010	Click	Hindi	Aameen Suma Aameen
2010	Right Yaaa Wrong	Hindi	Lakhnavi Kabaab; Lakhnavi Kabaab (Remix)
2010	Kedi	Telugu	Enduko Enthaki
2010	Thamassu	Kannada	Nodu Baare
2010	Krantiveer - The Revolution	Hindi	Firangi Paani
2010	Badmaash Company	Hindi	Jingle Jingle
2010	Tere Bin Laden	Hindi	Kukudu
2010	Mel Karade Rabba	Punjabi	Dil Wali Kothi, Balle Balle, Dil Wali Kothi [Remix]
2010	Dabangg	Hindi	Humka Peeni Hai; Humka Peeni Hai (Remix)
2010	Soch Lo	Hindi	Faani Dayar
2010	Action Replayy	Hindi	Zor Ka Jhatka (Remix)
2010	Band Baaja Baaraat	Hindi	Ainvayi (Club Remix)
2010	No Problem	Hindi	Shakira; Shakira (Remix)
2010	Mar Jawan Gur Khake	Punjabi	Bolliyan, Dard Bolde Ne; Mar Jawan Gur Khake (Remix)
2010	Toonpur Ka Superrhero	Hindi	Nach Mere Naal; Nach Mere Naal (Remix)
2011	Yamla Pagla Deewana	Hindi	Chamki Jawaani
2011	Patiala House	Hindi	Rola Pe Gaya; Rola Pe Gaya (Remix)
2011	7 Khoon Maaf	Hindi	Awaara
2011	Thank You	Hindi	Razia; Razia (Remix)
2011	U R My Jaan	Hindi	Bin Tere We Mahi
2011	Sahi Dhandhe Galat Bande	Hindi	Thap Denge
2011	Bas Ek Tamanna	Hindi	Khuda Vandi
2011	Ye Stupid Pyar	Hindi	Ajj Ishq Da Mausam
2011	Yaar Annmulle	Punjabi	Mera Peer Jaane Meri (Peerh)
2011	Na Jaane Kabse	Hindi	Thand Pe Gayi
2011	Pure Punjabi	Punjabi	Daddy Kehnde Ne
2012	Shudra The Rising	Hindi	Aatma Jale
2012	Will You Marry Me	Hindi	Danke Ki Chot; Danke Ki Chot (Duet)
2012	Bittoo Boss	Hindi	
2012	Tu Mera 22 Main Tera 22	Punjabi	Horan Naal Nachdi
2013	Matru Ki Bijlee Ka Mandola	Hindi	Lootnewaale
2013	Jatt Di Dhushmani	Punjabi	Dhokebaaz
2013	Fer Mamla Gadbad Gadbad	Punjabi	Rab Jaane
2013	Best of Luck	Punjabi	Judaiyaan (Master Saleem Version)
2013	Jatt Airways	Punjabi	Kalliyan, Jatt Airways, Ok Report
2014	Dedh Ishqiya	Hindi	Kya Hoga
2014	Sheesha Yaar Da	Punjabi	Desh Mera
	Tofan Singh	Punjabi	Je Auna Verhy Ashiqan Dy
2017	Irada	Hindi	
2018	Halkaa	Hindi	Morni
2021	Shiddat	Hindi	Akhiyan Udeek Diyan
2022	Tara vs Bilal	Hindi	Teri Ho Gayi
2023	Yaariyan 2	Hindi	Peene De
2026	Ikkis	Hindi	Tera Aashiq
TBA	Hikk Naal	Punjabi	Twitter Meri

== Discography ==
=== Music albums ===
Release	Album	Record label	Music
2015	Canada Jatt	Kamlee Records/Speed Records	V Grooves
2013	English Khana	Kamlee Records/Speed Records	Anu-Manu
2010	Jind Mahi	Kamlee Records/Speed Records	Sachin Ahuja
2007	Tere Bin; Salaam	Kamlee Records; Speed Records	Sachin Ahuja
2004	Ik Zindri	Speed Records	Sachin Ahuja
2003	Jadon Da Saada Dil Tuttia	Saga	Jaidev Kumar
1990	Charkhe Di Ghook	CTC	Charanjit Ahuja

=== Tracks on compilations ===
- 2009 : Sajni, Teri Sajni (Sony BMG)
- 2010 : Nach Ke Vikha, Jhanjar Chanak Payee (Speed Records)
- 2011 : Tu Hi Tu, Star Plus Anthem
- 2014 : Bhagat Singh – Single (Dharam Seva Records)

=== Devotional albums ===
- 2006 Mela Maiya Da (T-Series)
- 2007 : Aaj Hai Jagrata (T-Series)
- 2009 : Guru Ravidass Ji Di Bani (T-Series)
- 2009 : Shiv Mere
- 2009 : jai jai kaar(T-Series)
- 2010 : Darshan Kanshi Wale Da (T-Series)
- 2010 : Maa Meharan Kardi (T-Series)
- 2010 : Shiv Bhole Bhandari (T-Series)
- 2010 : Singh Jaikare Bolde (T-Series)
- 2011 : Chal re Kanwariya(Jai Bala Music)
- 2016 : Bholey Di Baraat

=== Singles ===
Album	Year	Tracks	Label
Dhol Jageero Da	2001	Dhol Jageero Da, Kuriyan Panjab Diya	Moviebox Birmingham Ltd.
Vix It Up	2004	Aj Kal	Kamlee Records
Sun Ve Rabba	2005	Tu Badli, Sahaan Vargiye	Speed Records
GroundShaker-2	2008	Ik Vaari Haa	Planet Recordz
Teenagers	2008	Teenagers	Speed Records
Bas Kar	2008	Chakar	4Play Recordings
2009 Vich No Tension	2009	Julfan De Naag	Speed Records
Saada Punjab	2009	T-Series	
Project Rehab	2009	Choorian	Kamlee Records
Blacklisted	2009	Chari Jawani	VIP Records
Re-Lit	2009	Put Jattan Da Baliyeh, Put Jattan Da (Bounce)	Organised Rhyme
Jhanjar Chanak Payee	2010	Nach Ke Dikha	Speed Records
Jashan-2010	2010	Gidhe Vich Ik Boli	Star Makers
Ashke Mitran De	2010	Ishqe Di Guddi, Khair Nahi	Spine Music
Munde Punjabi	2010	Munde Punjabi	Speed Records
Dil Karda	2010	Dil Karda, Dil Karda (Acoustic Version), Dil Karda (Instrumental)	Limitless Records Ltd
American Desi	2010	Teray Hussan De Maare	MovieBox, Speed Records
Maahi – My Love	2010	Maahi Da Maahi Da	T-Series
Dramey Baazi	2011	By God	MovieBox
DJ Bhuvi XS	2011	Dream Girl	T-Series
Ek Gera	2011	Ek Gera	Kamlee Records
Unleashed	2011	Janeman Tere Bina	Kamlee Records
Bhangrafornia	2011	Ik Kurdi Punjaban	Desi Impact Prod.
Saari Saari Raat	2011	Aaja Sohniye Aaja	Moviebox
Sajna	2011	Sajna	Stripes Productions
Pyar	2012	Pyar	E3UK
Singh Mareya Ni Mukhney	2014	Singh Mareya Ni Mukhney	Dharam Seva Records
