= Lehar Khan =

Indian actress

- Born: 4 July 1999 (age 26); New Delhi, India
- Occupations: Actress, Model
- Years active: 2012–present

Lehar Khan is an Indian actress and model who works in Hindi films. She made her debut in 2012 with the film Jalpari: The Desert Mermaid (2012) in the leading role as a child actor. Since then, she has appeared in notable productions such as Parched (2015), Brahmāstra: Part One – Shiva (2022), and Jawan (2023).

== Personal life ==
Lehar Khan was born in New Delhi, India.

== Filmography ==
=== Films ===
Year	Title	Role	Ref.
2012	Jalpari: The Desert Mermaid	Shreya	
2015	Parched	Janaki	
2022	Brahmāstra: Part One – Shiva	Raveena	
2023	Jawan	Kalki	

=== Short films ===
Title	Role	Notes	Ref.
Destiny	Angel	Done at the London Newport film school	
Khol Do	Sakina	Based on Saadat Hasan Manto's story	

=== Series ===
Year	Title	Role	Notes
2022	Dahan: Raakan Ka Rahasya	Rani	Disney+ Hotstar Original Series
2013	Confessions of an Indian Teenager	Mickey	Channel V Television Series

== Dance ==
- Kids' Dhoom
- Punjab Kesari Little Star
- Aja Nachle
