= Sameera (film) =

- Directed by: Vinay Shukla
- Produced by: K. K. Mahajan; Pran Mehra
- Starring: Parikshat Sahni; Amol Palekar; Shabana Azmi; Mithun Chakraborty
- Cinematography: K. K. Mahajan
- Music by: Jaidev
- Release date: 2 January 1981
- Running time: 125 minutes
- Country: India
- Language: Hindi

Sameera is a 1981 Indian Hindi-language film directed by Vinay Shukla. It stars Mithun Chakraborty, Shabana Azmi and Parikshat Sahni.

== Cast ==
- Mithun Chakraborty
- Shabana Azmi
- Parikshit Sahni

== Songs ==
The songs are composed by Jaidev, released under the name "Wohi Baat", the previous title of the film.

Song	Singer
"Zehar Deta Hai" (Male)	Bhupinder Singh
"Zehar Deta Hai" (Female)	Asha Bhosle
"Zindagi Hum Tere Haal Par"	Asha Bhosle
"Jaane Na Doongi"	Asha Bhosle
