= 99 (2009 film) =

- Theatrical release poster
- Directed by: Raj and D.K.
- Written by: Raj and D.K. Sita Menon
- Produced by: Anupam Mittal; Aditya Shastri
- Starring: Kunal Khemu; Boman Irani; Soha Ali Khan; Cyrus Broacha; Simone Singh; Mahesh Manjrekar; Amit Mistry; Vinod Khanna
- Cinematography: Prakash Kutty; Rajeev Ravi
- Edited by: Cheragh Todiwala
- Music by: Shamir Tandon; Ashutosh Pathak
- Distributed by: People Pictures
- Release date: 15 May 2009
- Running time: 140 minutes
- Country: India
- Language: Hindi
- Budget: ₹90 million
- Box office: ₹147.6 million

99 is a 2009 Indian Hindi-language crime comedy film directed by Raj and D.K., starring Kunal Khemu, Boman Irani, Soha Ali Khan and Cyrus Broacha. The film is set in the year 1999, with cricket controversies of that year as the backdrop. It was produced and distributed by "People Pictures", and was released on 15 May 2009.

== Plot ==
Sachin and Zaramud are two small-time crooks in Mumbai who make a living out of duplicating mobile phone SIM cards. After the overuse of a duplicated SIM by a customer, the police raid their premises and destroy all their equipment. Sachin and Zaramud escape in a stolen car, which eventually crashes. Although Sachin and Zaramud escape with minor injuries, the car is damaged beyond repair. AGM, a bookie based out of Mumbai, is the owner of this car and tracks them down. They are hired to work for AGM till the time they are capable of paying the compensation for the damages.

Rahul, an executive in a currency exchange company in Delhi, has a penchant for betting and gambling. He borrows money from AGM after being introduced by a Delhi bookie, Bhuval Ram Kuber, and bets on India winning a cricket match against New Zealand. However, India loses. In spite of owing money to AGM, Rahul continues in his gambling ways and plays teen patti with JC, who is a big businessman and bookie. After Rahul goes all-in and JC raises on the bet, Rahul identifies JC's bluff and ends up winning. JC jokingly vows to beat Rahul some day.

Sachin and Zaramud prepare a list of individuals who owe money to AGM. Top of this list is Kewal Pandey, a Bhojpuri film actor, and next on the list is Rahul. Since Rahul is based out of Delhi, which is outside the area of AGM's operations, AGM sends Sachin and Zaramud to Delhi to retrieve the money Rahul owes him. They reach Delhi and put up in a 5-star hotel. Sachin develops a liking for Pooja, who is a floor manager in the hotel. The two bond over their mutual desire of owning an independent business, and Sachin informs Pooja about his idea of owning a coffee shop someday and 'scoring a century in life'.

Rahul is met with Kuber and his solitary goon Dimple demanding money that Rahul owes Kuber. Rahul gets beaten up when he is unable to pay. Sachin and Zaramud visit Rahul at his office to demand AGM's money and take US$50,000 that Rahul had just received from a client. However, on their way to the airport, all their belongings, along with the briefcase filled with money, get stolen. However, the thieves are unable to find the money in the secret compartment, and the briefcase ends up in the godown of a salesman, who sells stolen goods outside Rahul's office.

Sachin and Zaramud go back to Rahul to inform him about the debacle. The three of them decide to bet on the outcome of the next India vs. South Africa cricket match using information that Rahul believes JC is privy to. The three of them extract half of the money Kewal Pandey owed AGM and decide to use it to place the bet. Kuber visits Rahul again but gets beaten up by Sachin. Rahul goes to the bar where he plays cards with C and strikes up a conversation with him in a bid to extract information about the match the next day. JC obliges and asks Rahul to bet on South Africa, as a key player on the Indian side had agreed to throw the match in exchange for money received from him.

Kuber informs AGM that Rahul had gotten him beaten up by two of his 'cousins', and AGM deciphers that these are Sachin and Zaramud. AGM sends one of his goons to Delhi, and himself follows suit. On the day of the match, after Rahul leaves to place the bet, Kuber reaches Sachin's room along with AGM's goon and kidnaps him. Sachin gets badly beaten up, but then manages to knock Kuber and AGM's goon unconscious. He meets Pooja and Zaramud at the hotel bar and follows the proceedings of the match. India manages to win on the back of a brilliant century by Tendulkar and some errors on the field by South Africa. The three of them are distraught. However, Rahul returns and informs them that he had seen through JC's bluff again and had betted on India, along with a side bet on Tendulkar.

Sachin visits a garment shop to collect the money. Zaramud discovers through recorded conversations on JC's sim that they had duplicated that the match was fixed on the side of the South Africans, and JC was behind it. He hands over the recordings to the CBI. Sachin gets chased by the police immediately after he receives the bag full of money. He manages to reach his hotel room, although the police also follow him to the hotel. He finds AGM waiting in the room and hands over the bag to AGM. As AGM reaches the hotel lobby, he is cornered by a group of policemen. There are sounds of shots being fired.

A salesman visits Rahul at the office with the stolen briefcase, recognizing it to be his. Rahul finds the money intact in the secret compartment. Elsewhere, as Sachin and Zaramud check out of the hotel, they are encountered by Kewal Pandey, who gives them the remaining half of the money he owed to AGM. As the end credits roll, it is revealed that Sachin and Pooja have opened a coffee shop, Zaramud has become a poster boy for fitness, and the recorded conversations from JC's SIM had helped unearth the match-fixing scandal that had rocked the cricketing world in the year 2000.

== Cast ==
- Kunal Khemu as Sachin
- Boman Irani as Rahul Mehrotra
- Soha Ali Khan as Pooja
- Cyrus Broacha as Zaramud
- Simone Singh as Jahnavi
- Mahesh Manjrekar as AGM
- Vinod Khanna as JC
- Sudesh Berry as Sunil Mehta
- Amit Mistry as Kuber
- Pitobash as Salesman
- Dali Vivekanandan as Ray Ban
- Divya Bhatnagar as Item 'Rakhee'

== Music ==
99

Soundtrack album by Ashutosh Pathak and Shamir Tandon
- Released: 17 April 2009
- Recorded: Mumbai
- Genre: Feature film soundtrack
- Length: 44:18
- Label: Saregama

=== Reception ===
The film's music received mixed reviews from critics. Indiatimes gave the soundtrack three stars out of four, saying the songs "What's Up", "Soch Mat Dobara", "Punjab Size" were average while praising "Kal Ki Tarah" and "Delhi Destiny". Bollywood Hungama's Joginder Tuteja gave the album two and a half stars out of five.

=== Soundtrack ===
No.	Title	Artist(s)	Length
1.	"Delhi Destiny"	Raja Hassan	4:43
2.	"Soch Mat Dobara"	Bonnie Chakraborthy	3:05
3.	"What's Up"	KK, Sunidhi Chauhan	5:11
4.	"Punjab Size"	Labh Jhanjua	3:50
5.	"Kal Ki Tarah"	Shaan, Sunidhi Chauhan	3:51
6.	"99 Theme"	Bonnie Chakraborthy	2:04
7.	"What's Up" (Remix)	DJ Whosane	3:31
8.	"Delhi Destiny" (Remix)	DJ Whosane	4:41

== Reception ==
=== Critical reception ===
Aseem Chhabra of Rediff.com gave the film 4 out 5 and told the viewers that "they will leave the theater laughing and entertained." Conversely, Elvis D'Silva writing for same website gave the film 2.5 out of 5, writing ″All told, 99 rates a solid B+ for effort and a C for actual delivery -- or in our star-studded vernacular, two-and-a-half of those five pointed little fellas.″

Indiatimes.com gave it 3.5 stars. Nikhat Kazmi of the Times Of India gave the movie 3 out of 5 stars stating that it has "a tangy, tongue-in-cheek tenor that ensures you never really lose the plot." Boxoffice.com said the "Bollywood flick should catch on with American audiences" and that "99 has potential to set new standard."

Taran Adarsh of Bollywood Hungama gave the film 2.5 out of 5, ″On the whole, 99 appeals in parts, more towards the second half. The film holds appeal for the youth and should find patronage from this faction of moviegoers at multiplexes mainly.″

=== Box office ===
The film was released on 15 May 2009 worldwide with about 500 prints. 99 had a slow start on Friday with 10–15%. Business picked up as reports were mainly positive. The film was a moderate box office success and was expected to find its patronage among the youth and the multiplex audiences to whom it is targeted.
