= Vinay Shukla =

Indian film writer and director

Vinay Shukla is an Indian film writer and director, who is producer of Hindi film Godmother.

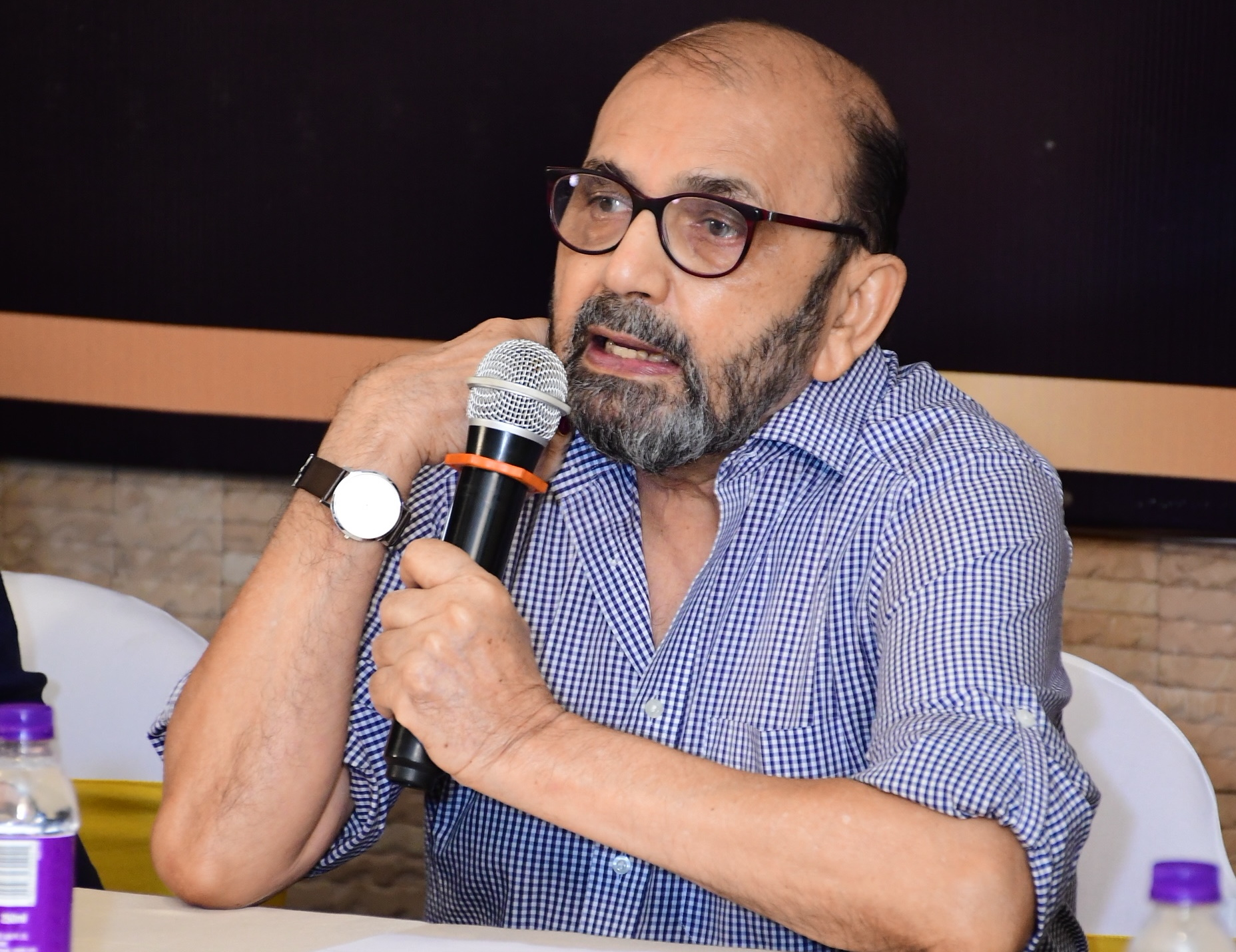
Vinay Shukla at the press conference to announce the ScreenWriters Association Awards in October 2022

== Profile ==
Vinay Shukla has been an active scriptwriter and director of Hindi films over the last three decades. His most well-known film, Godmother, won the National Film Award for Best Feature Film in Hindi in 1999 and the Filmfare Award for Best Story in 2000.

== History ==
His association with performance arts began at the age of nine when he began participating in radio plays at Akashwani, Jaipur. Thereafter, his creative urges led him into theater at college and university levels. These experiences eventually drew him towards the cinema. So, he joined the Film and Television Institute at Pune. The training and exposure at the institute set the ground for a deep and lifelong interest in not just film-making in general, but more particularly the unique and vibrant narrative form that is at the center of popular Indian films. He passed out with a gold medal and immediately plunged into the first step of film-making and scriptwriting.

Twenty five odd films followed in regular succession. Vinay Shukla kept experimenting with different styles of story conception, screenplay formats and dialog construction in regular mainstream fare (Satyamev Jayate, Ram Jaane, Virasat...) as well as off-the-beaten-track subjects (Parinay, Tarang...) achieving success and/or acclaim along the way as well as popular awards.

Simultaneously, his interest in traditional performing arts and their narrative peculiarities continued to enrich his own understanding of the elements that the Indian film narrative form had borrowed from each. He was increasingly convinced that an awareness of popular Indian cinema among Bollywood's writers and directors could lead to much more imaginative, engaging and entertaining forms that could also allow serious issues and themes to be tackled in the screenplay.

This conviction led to the most definitive example of this form in Vinay Shukla's career until now - Godmother. The film had critics raving for a long time. It also received six National Awards, including for Best Feature Film in Hindi and Best Actress and a Filmfare Award.

== Current status ==
Vinay Shukla lectures at the Screenplay Writing course at the FTII, Pune, which he helped set up in 2004, and also at the Whistling Woods, Mumbai. He has conducted scriptwriting workshops in Lucknow, at the Satyajit Ray Film Institute, Kolkata and was a mentor at MAISHA (Mira Nair's organisation), Kampala in 2006.

His most recent written & directed film Mirch released in December, 2010. The film revolves around four short stories subjected on issues of women emancipation, based on a story from the Panchatantra which travels in its various versions to modern times. Konkona Sen Sharma and Raima Sen star in two of these short stories. The film premiered at the I View Film Festival on 26 September 2010, where it won the Popular Choice Award for Outstanding Cinema.

== Selected filmography ==
Year	Film	Notes
1980	Hum Paanch	
1981	Sameera	
1985	Aitbaar	
1987	Diljalaa	
1995	Ram-Jaane	
1999	Godmother	
2002	Koi Mere Dil Se Poochhe	
2010	Mirch	
