= One by Two (2014 film) =

2014 film by Devika Bhagat

One By Two
- Theatrical release poster
- Directed by: Devika Bhagat
- Screenplay by: Devika Bhagat
- Story by: Devika Bhagat
- Produced by: Amit Kapoor; Abhay Deol; Sanjay Kapoor Vikram Khakhar; Viacom 18 Motion Pictures
- Starring: Abhay Deol; Preeti Desai
- Cinematography: Neha Parti Matiyani
- Edited by: Shan Mohammed
- Music by: Shankar–Ehsaan–Loy
- Production companies: Cynozure Networkz; IE Films
- Distributed by: Viacom 18 Motion Pictures
- Release date: 31 January 2014
- Running time: 139 minutes
- Country: India
- Language: Hindi
- Budget: ₹210 million
- Box office: ₹37.7 million

One By Two is a 2014 Indian romantic comedy film directed by Devika Bhagat. The film stars Abhay Deol and Preeti Desai in lead roles and follows the lives of two individuals, Amit (Deol) and Samara (Desai), living in Mumbai. Amit, stuck in a dead-end job and dealing with a recent breakup, finds himself drawn to Samara, a struggling dancer with aspirations of making it big. Their paths cross in unexpected ways as they navigate their individual struggles and search for meaning in their lives.

One By Two was released on 31 January 2014 and played across approximately 500 screens in India, primarily in multiplexes. The film received mixed-to-negative reviews from critics, with criticism for its screenplay and lack of chemistry between the lead actors, but praise for the music and humor. It emerged as a commercial failure at the box-office, grossing only ₹4 crore worldwide on a production budget of ₹15 crore.

== Plot ==
Amit Sharma, a man stuck in a dull personal and professional life, is still reeling from his recent breakup with his girlfriend Radhika, who left him for another man. His colleagues constantly mock him, and despite his parents' attempts to set him up with Shishika, a potential match, Amit remains hung up on Radhika. Unable to move forward, he finds little solace in his routine life.

Samara Patel, an aspiring dancer, lives with her alcoholic mother and is determined to make a name for herself in the dance world. She is in a superficial relationship with Jonathan, who is more interested in physical intimacy than emotional connection. After being rejected by Jonathan for a major dance campaign, Samara enrolls in a reality dance competition in hopes of achieving her dreams.

Meanwhile, Amit discovers that Radhika left him for Ranjan, a producer on the same dance show Samara is competing in. To undermine Ranjan and win back Radhika, Amit hacks the results of the competition, causing talented dancers, including Samara, to be unfairly eliminated. This act disrupts the show’s credibility, leading to public outrage and Ranjan’s downfall.

After being rejected once again by Radhika, who deems him "boring and useless", Amit spirals deeper into self-doubt. Samara, dealing with her own family issues, has a heated argument with her father, who had previously abandoned her and her mother. She realizes he doesn’t care for her when he fails to acknowledge her as his daughter at a party.

At a party, Amit and Samara have a brief encounter in a bathroom, where Amit unknowingly hands her a roll of toilet paper, though they don’t meet face to face. Their paths continue to cross in subtle ways without them realizing the connection.

Amit, frustrated with his life, embarrasses himself during a family meeting with Shishika's parents by performing in front of them inappropriately dressed. Meanwhile, Samara and her dance partner create a viral dance video set to a song accidentally composed by Amit, after they found his lost hard disk. This brings her success, and Amit receives credit for the music, gaining confidence from the recognition.

When Radhika returns, attempting to reunite with Amit, he turns her down, having realized his worth. He offers to perform his song for the dance competition's finale, where Samara has re-entered as a wildcard contestant. Samara, now resolute in her independence, ends her toxic relationship with Jonathan and reconciles with her mother, deciding to stay by her side instead of moving in with her father.

As Samara delivers a breathtaking final performance, Amit and others watch in awe. However, Samara sneaks out of the venue with her mother before the winner is announced, leaving everyone surprised that she doesn’t claim victory. In a final twist of fate, Amit and Samara accidentally meet in a pub. Amit compliments her performance, and she praises his music.

The film concludes with Samara, Amit, her mother, and his friends finally coming together, suggesting a promising new chapter for both protagonists.

== Cast ==
- Abhay Deol as Amit Sharma
- Preeti Desai as Samara Patel
- Rati Agnihotri as Meenu Sharma, Amit's mother
- Jayant Kripalani as Sushil Sharma, Amit's father
- Lillete Dubey as Kalpana Patel, Samara's mother
- Anish Trivedi as Samara's father
- Darshan Jariwala as ACP Dhawan, Amit's uncle
- Netarpal Singh Heera as Bunty
- Yudishtir Urs as Jonathan Rebello
- Preetika Chawla as Anika
- Tahir Raj Bhasin as Mihir Deshpande
- Geetika Tyagi as Radhika Rupani
- Maya Sarao as Shaila
- Yashika Dhillon as Shishika Kalra
- Dr. Rajesh Asthana as Mr. Reddy
- Diwakar Pundir as Ranjan Sadanah
- Shrishti Arya as Promila
- Tanvir Singh as Host of dance show
- B.K. Tiwari as ACP Salgaonkar
- Neelam Sharma as Inspector Chowgule
- Hemant Soni as Halwaldar More
- Amit Shukla as Inspector Shetty

== Critical reception ==
One by Two received mixed-to-negative reviews from critics, with criticism for its screenplay and lack of chemistry between the lead actors, but praise for the music and humor.

Film critic Subhash K Jha writes that One by Two is "irresistible in parts" and "never disappoints." He says there is a "winsome, bubbly bouncy and ebullient quality to this take on urban aspirations."

== Box office ==
One By Two collected Rs 2.25–25.0 million nett in its first week, mostly from multiplexes in Mumbai and Delhi. Box Office India called the business "very poor".

== Contractual dispute ==
During the production of One By Two, lead actor and producer Abhay Deol had a public fallout with music company T-Series. The dispute arose when T-Series asked the film's music composers, Shankar–Ehsaan–Loy, to sign contracts that the composers believed to be illegal. These contracts would have transferred their rights to royalties over to the music company, a clause which the composers and Deol refused to agree to.

Deol took to social media to express his frustration, accusing T-Series of deliberately delaying the release and promotion of the film's soundtrack due to their refusal to sign the agreements. He stated that T-Series was withholding the release of the music as a pressure tactic. T-Series, in response, denied these allegations, stating that they had uploaded three songs from the movie on their YouTube channel. They argued that they could not proceed with a full release of the music without proper legal clarity on the rights involved, which they claimed were the responsibility of the film's producers.

In a subsequent statement, T-Series explained that Viacom18, the film's co-producer, had assured them that they owned all the necessary rights, including the music rights. T-Series claimed they were being unnecessarily drawn into a dispute that should have been between Deol and Viacom 18.

After considerable pressure and a campaign led by Deol, Shankar–Ehsaan–Loy, and other artists, T-Series eventually relinquished their hold on the music rights. The soundtrack was eventually released through other companies—Crecendo released the physical copies, while Unisys handled the digital release. The music became available just five days before the film's theatrical release.

== Soundtrack ==
One By Two

Soundtrack album by Shankar–Ehsaan–Loy
- Released: 27 January 2014
- Recorded: 2013
- Genre: Feature film soundtrack
- Length: 27:48
- Language: Hindi
- Label: Zee Music Company
- Producer: Abhay Deol

Shankar–Ehsaan–Loy chronology
D-Day (2013)	One By Two (2014)	Darr @ the Mall (2014)
External audio
- Audio Jukebox on YouTube

All lyrics are written by Amitabh Bhattacharya.

Track listing
No.	Title	Singer(s)	Length
1.	"I'm Just Pakaoed"	Siddharth Mahadevan	2:37
2.	"Kaboom"	Anushka Manchanda	2:56
3.	"Baat Kya Hai"	Clinton Cerejo	5:03
4.	"Khushfehmiyan"	Shankar Mahadevan	4:37
5.	"Khushfehmiyan (Unplugged)"	Shankar Mahadevan	3:34
6.	"Sheher Mera"	Thomson Andrews	3:33
7.	"Khuda Na Khasta"	Arijit Singh	5:46
Total length:			27:48
