= Halkaa =

- Film poster
- Directed by: Nila Madhab Panda
- Produced by: Roshini Nadar Malhotra
- Starring: Ranvir Shorey; Paoli Dam
- Cinematography: Pratap Rout
- Edited by: Archit D Rastogi
- Music by: Shankar-Ehsaan-Loy
- Release date: 7 September 2018
- Running time: 133 minutes
- Country: India
- Language: Hindi

Halkaa is a 2018 Indian Hindi-language family film directed by PadmaShri Nila Madhab Panda starring Ranvir Shorey & Paoli Dam. The movie was released on 7 September 2018. A trailer was released on 7 August 2018

== Plot ==
The film follows a young boy, Pichku's journey from the slums of Mumbai to Delhi to fulfill his dream of owning a toilet, against his fathers wishes.

== Cast ==
- Paoli Dam as Shobha
- Ranvir Shorey as Ramesh

== Soundtrack ==
No.	Title	Singer(s)	Length
1.	"Halkaa Ho Ja Re"	Divya Kumar, Ankita Kundu
2.	"Khushbeyein"	Shankar Mahadevan
3.	"Morni"	Master Saleem, Protiqe
4.	"Bandeya"	Raman Mahadevan, Ravi Mishra
