= Preeti Desai =

British actress and fashion model (born 1981)

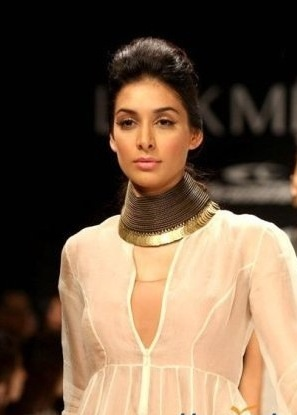
- Desai in 2012
- Born: Preeti Desai; 29 September 1981 (age 45); Middlesbrough, England
- Occupations: Actress; model
- Years active: 2010–present

Preeti Desai (born 29 September 1981) is a British film and television actress, and former fashion model. Desai is listed as the Times of India's 50 Most Desirable Women and People Magazine's 50 Most Beautiful People in 2011.

== Early life ==
Desai was born in Middlesbrough, North Yorkshire, England to Hemlata (née Niak) and Jitendra, who have a pyrotechnics company. Both of her parents are of Gujarati descent; her father is from Kenya and her mother is from Uganda. Her younger sibling Anjlee Desai, is a singer and songwriter.

Desai attended St Augustine's RC Primary School in Coulby Newham, then to Nunthorpe Secondary school in Nunthorpe, and Middlesbrough College.

== Career ==
=== Film & Television ===
Following the advice of Shahrukh Khan, Desai enrolled in Anupam Kher's drama school in 2008. Desai made her acting debut with acclaimed film Shor in the City (2011) and was nominated for Best Lead Actress at the South Asian Rising Star Film Awards in New York City in October 2012. Released in April 2011. Directed by Raj Nidimoru and D. K.Krishna, produced by Balaji Telefilms' Ekta Kapoor. Desai plays the role of the female protagonist Sharmili opposite Indian-American actor Sendhil Ramamurthy. The film is a thriller drama, set in contemporary Mumbai with three separate but interrelated storylines, of which one is in English and the other two are in Hindi.

The film and Desai's performance got rave reviews by critics and audience alike with an average star rating of 4, stating Desai had great screen presence.

Desai was nominated for Best Lead Actress at the South Asian Rising Star Film Awards in New York in October 2012 presented by SAIFF and HBO. Shor in the City was officially selected for the Pusan International Film Festival and the Dubai International Film Festival in 2011. The film won the Best Director Award at MIAAC in New York.

In 2014, Desai was seen in the lead role opposite Abhay Deol for the feature film titled One by Two directed by Devika Bhagat and produced by Amit Kapoor.

After moving to Los Angeles, USA in 2015. Desai played the role of Jen Green in the 2017 thriller The Bachelor Next Door directed by Michael Feifer. The film starred Michael Welch, Tyler Johnson, and Haylie Duff. Her other work with director Michael Feifer includes The Work Wife on Amazon Prime, where she played the role of Katie, and Saving My Baby

In 2019, Desai shot for the comedy pilot series Woman Up written and directed by Zoe Lister-Jones for ABC and 20th Century Fox Television. The series features Mary Elizabeth Ellis and Tawny Newsome as her co-stars.

Desai stars in Damien Chazelle's 2020 The Stunt Double produced and distributed by Apple Cinematography by Linus Sandgren Composer original music by Lorne Balfe.

Desai then went on to star in a leading role of Green Goddess in the 2022 Netflix Original series "The Guardians of Justice".

Desai most recently played the role of Charlie Bristow, a former British Special Air Service. Charlie Bristow is a recurring character in Seasons 5 and 6 of "The Rookie" for ABC, lionsgate Television

=== Other Work ===
Desai continues to work with brands such as De'longhi and appears in a principal role in a campaign directed by Damien Chazelle opposite Brad Pitt. Other brand campaigns include, Lexus, Samsung, Toyota, Keurig, Walmart.

=== Fashion Model ===
Desai moved to Mumbai in 2008. Represented by ace photographer Atul Kasbekar at one of the leading Indian agencies Bling. she appeared on the cover of L'officiel magazine with super star Shahrukh Khan as her 1st assignment. That assignment was followed with: the Kingfisher Calendar 2008. Desai was also selected to be solely on the cover of the Kingfisher Calendar special edition.

In the same year, Desai appeared on the October cover of Cosmopolitan magazine. for the 10 year anniversary special with a 3 magazine special featuring Priyanka Chopra Jonas and Deepika Padukone on the other 2 covers. Desai soon became a favourite in the Indian fashion industry and walked for many famous and high end designers at fashion weeks and graced the covers of many more magazines. Ranked in the top 50 of the Times 50 Most Desirable Women of 2011 and People Magazine's most beautiful people., closed the show as a showstopper for designer Anita Dongre at Lakme Fashion Week in 2012, and featured in commercials for LG, Honda, Cadbury, Citibank and Nokia.

In October 2009, Desai was announced as the new face of the retail apparel company Provogue along with Indian actor Hrithik Roshan. Desai has also featured with Italian designer Leonardo Ferragamo of Salvatore Ferragamo for L'Officiel magazine and walked for fashion designer Christopher Kane in Fashion Week.

== Miss Great Britain ==
=== Miss Great Britain (2006) ===
Desai was crowned Miss Cleveland and then went on to win Miss Great Britain in 2006. As a British Indian, she was the first woman of Indian heritage to win the title. She was crowned Miss Great Britain after the previous winner was disqualified and stripped of her title due to allegations of her involvement with one of the judges and her agreement to pose for Playboy magazine. The people of Great Britain through the Sun newspaper voted Desai to take over as the winner.

Desai moved to London from the North East of England to carry out her role as ambassador of Miss Great Britain.

Desai supported organisations like Mind and Carers Week, which took her to 10 Downing Street to have tea with then Prime Minister Gordon Brown to highlight the work of the charities, and to the Houses of Parliament to get MPs to team up with her in support of Carers Week.

== Public Image ==
Desai was listed as one of Time's 50 Most Desirable Women and People magazine's 50 Most Beautiful People in 2011.

Esquire magazine featured Desai as 'A Woman we love' and wrote "The first thing you notice about Preeti Desai are her slinky long legs, model physique and huge doe-like brown eyes. Then she opens her mouth and a strong Northern English accent burst out – a nostalgic flashback reminiscent of the old Boddingtons adverts that featured glamorous, sophisticated women but, humorously, with pronounced Manchester accents. The down-to-earth naughty humoured breath of fresh air walk's in and preambles."

Top Indian designer Anita Dongre known for never using showstoppers in her runway shows, for the first time in August 2012 asked Desai to close the show at fashion week. Questioning Dongre on why she wanted Desai to don the final piece, Anita Dongre said "I saw no one else but Preeti in my showstopper design, she makes all my designs look beautiful, and she has the right elegance, confidence and poise."

== Awards and nominations ==
Desai was nominated for Best Lead Actress at the South Asian Rising Star Film Awards in New York in October 2012 presented by SAIFF and HBO for her role in her debut film Shor in the City.

== Filmography ==
Year	Film/TV	Role	Notes
2011	Shor in the City	Shalmili	
2014	One by Two	Samara Patel	Netflix
2017	The Bachelor Next Door	Jennifer Green	Lifetime
2018	Saving My Baby	Dr Desai	Lifetime
2018	The Work Wife	Katie Williams	Amazon Prime
2020	The Stunt Double	Leading Lady	Commissioned by Apple
2022	The Guardians of Justice	Golden Goddess	Netflix series
2023–2024	The Rookie	Charlie Bristow	ABC studios/Hulu/Lionsgate TV
