= A Gentleman =

2017 Indian film by Raj & DK

A Gentleman: Sundar, Susheel and Risky
- Theatrical release poster
- Directed by: Raj & D.K.
- Screenplay by: Raj & DK
- Dialogues by: Sumit Batheja
- Story by: Raj & DK; Sita Menon
- Produced by: Fox Star Studios
- Starring: Sidharth Malhotra; Jacqueline Fernandez; Suniel Shetty; Darshan Kumaar
- Cinematography: Roman Jakobi
- Edited by: Aarif Sheikh
- Music by: Sachin–Jigar
- Production company: Fox Star Studios
- Distributed by: Fox Star Studios
- Release date: 25 August 2017
- Running time: 130 minutes
- Country: India
- Language: Hindi
- Budget: ₹70 crores
- Box office: ₹38.3 crores

A Gentleman: Sundar, Susheel, Risky is a 2017 Indian Hindi-language action comedy film directed by Raj & DK and produced by Fox Star Studios. The film stars Sidharth Malhotra, alongside Jacqueline Fernandez, Suniel Shetty and Darshan Kumar. The music was composed by Sachin–Jigar, while cinematography and editing were handled by Roman Jakobi and Aarif Sheikh respectively.

A Gentleman: Sundar, Susheel, Risky was released on 25 August 2017 to mixed reviews from critics and became a commercial disaster.

== Plot ==
2017: Gaurav Kapoor, an engineer working at a software firm in suburban Miami, plans to marry his friend Kavya, but she prefers a man with an adventurous and risk-loving nature. Gaurav tries to ask Kavya on a date and also meets her parents, who consider Gaurav as a potential groom for Kavya. Meanwhile, Gaurav is ordered by his boss to visit Mumbai to close a business deal. However, his initial hesitation to go there hints he may have something to do with difficult and mysterious Rishi Purohit, a doppelganger who has remained unknown and unseen for the longest time since his disappearance.

2012: Rishi, a clandestine spy, works for an espionage organization Unit X, which is headed by his superior, Colonel Vijay Saxena as (Suniel Shetty). Rishi and his team attempt to extract intelligence from the Chinese Embassy in Bangkok. While escaping, Yakob, a teammate, shoots down an innocent police officer, which enrages Rishi. Rishi returns to Mumbai, where he talks to Vijay about retiring from the world of espionage. Vijay Saxena asks him to perform one last job for him and this involves spying on Mishra, the Defense Secretary of India, who has information Vijay wants to lay hands on. Rishi manages to save information to the hard drive and later meets Gaurav, a database manager working in a weapons manufacturing company, Norcorp, in Miami. Gaurav and Rishi retrieve the important data about Mishra's connections. Gaurav is later shot to immediate death by Yakub in order to eliminate evidence and clue for Vijay Saxena., having decided that he cannot let Rishi loose, instructs Yakub through a text message to kill him. Rishi senses the suspicion and fights off Yakub and the other agents. Yakub manages to shoot Rishi, but Rishi manages to escape; he eventually adopts Gaurav's identity and goes to Miami for a peaceful life, revealing that he is in fact Rishi himself.

2017: After being unintentionally recorded in a viral video and recognised by the members of Unit X, Rishi is soon attacked by Koko, an associate of Unit X's local contact Jignesh. He is forced to abduct and hide Koko in his car, which is noticed by his friend Dixit, who tries to help him and unintentionally kills Koko in the struggle. Yakub and the other Unit X agents track Rishi down and confront him, where Rishi finally confesses that he needed a peaceful life and reveals to Yakub that the hard drive was unintentionally destroyed by Yakub himself when he had tried to kill Rishi earlier.

Rishi is knocked down unconscious and soon finds himself handcuffed with Kavya, who had stopped by his house. Enraged, Rishi uses his skills to escape with Kavya from the trouble and ends up confessing to her about his past profession. Kavya berates Rishi, but later forgives him. Later that night, Yakub and his team finds Rishi and Kavya at the motel they are hiding in. After Rishi reveals to Yakub that the data actually contains Norcorp's illegal financial transactions with Indian politicians and also had information about Vijay's unlawful activities. Gaurav had learnt about this and hatched a deal with Mishra to sell the data in exchange for money.

Yakub tells Rishi to extract the data on Norcorp servers and give it to him, in exchange for leaving him and Kavya. Rishi manages to extract the data, but the security guards notices and begin chasing Rishi. Yakub aborts the operation and abandons him. However, Rishi manages to escape with Kavya's help. Yakub and his team meets Rishi at his house, where Rishi kills most of Yakub's henchmen with the help of Kavya. However, Rishi spares Yakub and two of his thugs and orders him to leave his house.

Driving away in Rishi's car, Yakub realises that the hard drive Rishi gave is blank and the car's trunk contains Koko's corpse. Working with Rishi, Dixit crashes into their car in a side collision, where the police arrive on the scene and discover the body. Yakub and the agents are killed by the cops. Vijay visits Rishi's house to confront him, but Vijay dies in a bomb blast accident that Rishi pre - planned for him. Rishi provides the data to the N.S.C and Unit X gets neutralised. Rishi and Kavya soon leave Miami with new identities of Hemanth Khanna and Pooja Khanna.

In a mid-credits scene, Dixit buys machine guns from a local gun store in Miami, before putting on a hoodie and walking away.

== Cast ==
- Sidharth Malhotra as Gaurav Kapoor / Rishi Purohit
- Jacqueline Fernandez as Kavya Chetwani
- Suniel Shetty as Colonel Vijay Saxena
- Darshan Kumaar as Yakub
- Hussain Dalal as Samarth Dixit, Gaurav's friend
- Rajit Kapur as Sameer Chetwani, Kavya's father
- Supriya Pilgaonkar as Ramika Chetwani, Kavya's mother
- Amit Mistry as Jignesh Patel
- Sijoy Varghese as Ramachandra Rao
- Shaheed Woods as Koko
- Kushal Punjabi as Willy
- Zachary Coffin as CEO Jim
- Hemant Koumar as Robbie
- Nikita Sachdev as Nikki

== Production ==
=== Development ===
Siddharth Anand initially stated that the film was originally developed and envisioned to be a sequel to the 2014 film Bang Bang! However, it was later redeveloped to be a standalone, which was also confirmed in a later interview, and would be directed by Raj & DK.

The director duo had approached Mahesh Babu with an initial draft, and he liked the script. Owing to the failure of 1: Nenokkadine, he expressed unwillingness at doing a similar film in quick succession and talks did not go further.

=== Filming ===
Filming began in mid-2016 under the working title Reloaded. In September 2016, it was reported that the international shooting schedule of A Gentleman: Sundar, Susheel, Risky had been cancelled. Later, it was revealed by a close source that "...there will be another long schedule in December, but the location is yet to be finalised and it could be in Europe."

== Soundtrack ==
A Gentleman: Sundar, Susheel, Risky

Soundtrack album by Sachin–Jigar
- Released: 27 July 2017
- Recorded: 2016–2017
- Genre: Feature film Soundtrack
- Length: 16:15
- Language: Hindi
- Label: T-Series

Sachin–Jigar chronology
Bhoomi (2017)	A Gentleman: Sundar, Susheel, Risky (2017)	Hindi Medium (2017)
External audio
- Official Audio Jukebox on YouTube

Singles from A Gentleman
- 1. "Disco Disco" Released: 20 July 2017; 2. "Baat Ban Jaye" Released: 27 July 2017; 3. "Chandalekha" Released: 4 August 2017; 4. "Bandook Meri Laila" Released: 16 August 2017

The music of the film is composed by Sachin–Jigar while the lyrics have been penned by Vayu and Priya Saraiya. Its first song, "Disco Disco", sung by Benny Dayal and Shirley Setia, was released on 17 July 2017. The second song released, "Bandook Meri Laila", sung by Ash King and Jigar Saraiya and rapped by Raftaar and Sidharth Malhotra, was released on 24 July 2017. The song marks Malhotra's singing debut and was the most popular song on the album. The third song, "Baat Ban Jaye", sung by Siddharth Basrur and Priya Saraiya, was released on 5 August 2017. The fourth song was a romantic one, "Laagi Na Choote", and was another chartbuster. It was released on 13 August 2017. The last song, "Chandralekha", sung by Vishal Dadlani and Jonita Gandhi, was released on 24 August 2017. The soundtrack of five songs was released on 24 August 2017 by T-Series.

All music is composed by Sachin–Jigar.

Track listing
No.	Title	Lyrics	Singer(s)	Length
1.	"Disco Disco"	Vayu	Benny Dayal, Shirley Setia	2:47
2.	"Baat Ban Jaye"	Priya Saraiya	Siddharth Basrur, Priya Saraiya	3:12
3.	"Chandralekha"	Vayu	Vishal Dadlani, Jonita Gandhi	3:12
4.	"Laagi Na Choote"	Priya Saraiya	Arijit Singh, Shreya Ghoshal	3:30
5.	"Bandook Meri Laila"	Vayu	Ash King, Jigar Saraiya Rap: Raftaar, Sidharth Malhotra	3:34
Total length:				16:15

== Release ==
A Gentleman: Sundar, Susheel, Risky was released on 25 August 2017, while it was released on 24 August 2017 in UAE.

== Reception ==
Nihit Bhave of The Times of India gave 3.5/5 stars and wrote "The film would have been a perfect entertainer had it held its cards closer to its chest. However, it still has plenty bang for your buck." Sweta Kaushal of Hindustan Times gave 3/5 stars and wrote "Raj and DK have managed to narrate the plain and full-of-cliches story in their own quirky style making A Gentleman fun to watch."

Kunal Guha of Mumbai Mirror gave 3/5 stars and wrote "Directors Raj and DK, who have previous helmed Shor in the City and Go Goa Gone, have put together this offering which packs in comedy, action and everything else, yet doesn’t entirely fit into the ‘masala’ construct. The film is worth the price of a multiplex ticket." Rachit Gupta of Filmfare gave 3/5 stars and wrote that the film's "smart writing and slick execution saved the film."

Samrudhi Ghosh of India Today gave 2.5/5 stars and wrote "A Gentleman makes for an entertaining watch. If a not-too-serious, masala film is your ideal weekend watch, then this film does not disappoint." Bollywood Hungama gave 2.5/5 stars and wrote "On the whole, A Gentleman surprises audience with the developments in the first half but the film goes downhill in the second half completely. Raj Nidimoru and Krishna DK’s screenplay handles the complex narrative well in the first half but overall, it could have been better and more sensible."

Rohit Bhatnagar of Deccan Chronicle wrote "A Gentleman is definitely an entertaining film which has its own set of loopholes but they can be easily overlooked." Udita Jhunjhunwala of Firstpost wrote "The comic parts of A Gentleman score over the action and as an action-comedy is falls short of taking any real risks."
