= Hindi Medium (soundtrack) =

Soundtrack album by Sachin–Jigar
- Released: 21 April 2017
- Recorded: 2016–2017
- Genre: Feature film soundtrack
- Length: 15:43
- Label: T-Series

Sachin–Jigar chronology
Meri Pyaari Bindu (2017)	Hindi Medium (2017)	A Gentleman (2017)
External audio
- Official Audio Jukebox on YouTube

Hindi Medium is the soundtrack album to the 2017 film of the same name written and directed by Saket Chaudhary and produced by Dinesh Vijan and Bhushan Kumar under Maddock Films and T-Series Films, starring Irrfan Khan, Saba Qamar, Dishita Sehgal, Deepak Dobriyal and Amrita Singh. The album featured two original songs composed by Sachin–Jigar with lyrics written by Priya Saraiya and Kumaar; two songs were further recreated for the film—"Suit Suit" composed by Guru Randhawa and Rajat Nagpal and "Oh Ho Ho Ho" by Sukhbir and Abhijit Vaghani. The soundtrack was released under the T-Series label on 21 April 2017.

== Release ==
The promotional video song for "Tenu Suit Suit Karda" was released on 12 April 2017. The video featured Guru Randhawa and Arjun performing the song; snippets from the film were also included in the music video. The song "Hoor" was released on 19 April. It is a romantic number sung by Atif Aslam, which was considered to be one of his biggest songs of that year. The third song "Ek Jindari" recorded by Taniskaa Sanghvi, Sachin Sanghvi's daughter. The music video was released on 28 April. The promotional video for "Oh Ho Ho Ho" was released on 4 May. The video featured Sukhbir and Ikka Singh performing the songs, with snippets from the film. The album was released under the T-Series label on 21 April 2017.

== Reception ==
Joginder Tuteja of Bollywood Hungama, rated the album a 3 out of 5 stars. He said that "the music of Hindi Medium turns out to be better than expected", and praised the inclusion of recreations of "Suit Suit" and "Oh Ho Ho Ho" as they were previously popular Punjabi songs. V. Lakshmi of The Times of India in a positive review of the album said that, "by the time the album ends, the listeners are left humming the tunes". Suanshu Khurana of The Indian Express called it "part-formulaic and part-interesting" and highlighted the song "Hoor" as the best song on the album.

== Track listing ==
No.	Title	Lyrics	Music	Singer(s)	Length
1.	"Tenu Suit Suit Karda"	Guru Randhawa, Arjun	Guru Randhawa, Rajat Nagpal	Guru Randhawa, Arjun	3:10
2.	"Hoor"	Priya Saraiya	Sachin–Jigar	Atif Aslam	3:57
3.	"Oh Ho Ho Ho" (Remix)	Kumaar	Sukhbir, Abhijit Vaghani	Sukhbir, Ikka Singh	4:04
4.	"Ek Jindari"	Kumaar	Sachin–Jigar	Taniskaa Sanghvi	4:31
Total length:					15:43

== Accolades ==
Award	Date of ceremony	Category	Recipients	Result	Ref.
Mirchi Music Awards	28 January 2018	Music Composer of The Year	Sachin–Jigar for "Hoor"	Nominated	

== Other versions ==
The track "Ek Jindari" was remade as "Ek Zindagi" for the spiritual successor Angrezi Medium (2020), thereby retaining the original composition and vocals from the track.
