= The Week That Wasn't =

Indian television series

- Genre: Satirical late night television
- Starring: Cyrus Broacha, Kunal Vijaykar, Gopal Datt, Mohit Mahale
- Country of origin: India
- Original language: English

Original release
- Network: CNN-News18
- Release: 2006 – 20 May 2023

The Week That Wasn't was an Indian satirical late night television programme hosted by Cyrus Broacha and shown on the CNN-IBN (now CNN News18) channel. Started in 2006, the cast included Kaneez Surka, Gopal Datt, Mohit Mahale, and Kunal Vijaykar with occasional appearances by Punit Pania and Ambika Vas.

In 2013, a defamation case was filed against Broacha and the team by the Tamil Nadu government over his comments during the show regarding Jayalalithaa's letter to the Prime Minister asking Sri Lankan players not to be allowed in the Indian Premier League (IPL).

On 30 May 2023, Cyrus Broacha announced on his podcast that the show had been canceled by the management at CNN News18. Cyrus further announced there would not be any more shows.

== See also ==
- On Air With AIB
- Fake or Not
