= Cyrus Broacha =

Indian television personality

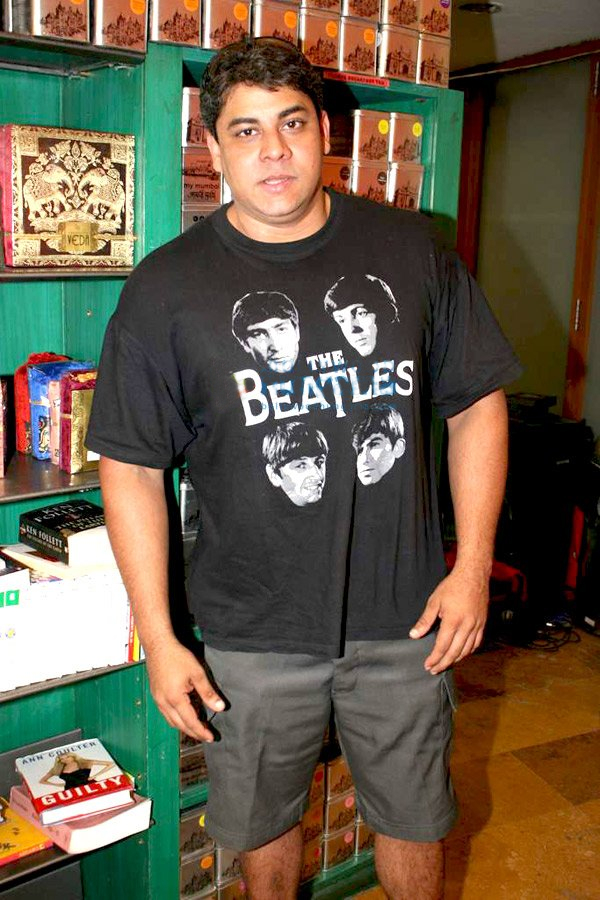
- Broacha in 2010 at a press conference for Golmaal 3
- Born: 7 August 1971 (age 55); Bombay, Maharashtra, India
- Spouse: Ayesha Broacha

YouTube information
- Channel: Cyrus Says
- Subscribers: 142 thousand
- Views: 84 million
- Last updated: 14 January 2025

Cyrus Broacha is an Indian anchor, theatre personality, comedian, political satirist, columnist, podcaster and author. He is best known for his show Bakra on MTV India and The Week That Wasn't on CNN-News18.

== Early years ==
Broacha was born on 7 August 1971, to a Parsi father and Catholic mother. He started acting at the age of five in a school play, The Emperor's New Clothes. Every year he performed and wrote for the school magazine, winning prizes for English and drama.

Cyrus's family originally hails from Bharuch in Gujarat.

== Career ==
He did his first professional play, Brighton Beach Memoirs in 1985, directed by Pearl Padamsee. When Broacha was 15, he acted in his first Hindi film, Jalwa which was released in 1987. He also worked as a radio jockey and did shows like Dial-In Show in 1993.

After graduation, Broacha went to the Lee Strasberg Theatre and Film Institute in New York City where he studied acting for theatre.

=== Television ===
He hosted many shows for MTV. His candid-camera show MTV Bakra ran for 8 years. He was also one of the founding MTV VJ member.

He played the role of Cyrus, a character based on Chandler Bing in the Indian adaptation of American sitcom Friends, titled Hello Friends.

He led India's "Rock the Vote" campaign and represented MTV at the UNAIDS conference in Hanover, Germany. He moderated the Indian segment of Be Heard - A Global Discussion With Colin Powell in February 2002.

He appeared in Jhalak Dikhhla Jaa, India's version of Dancing with the Stars, and Fear Factor – Khatron Ke Khiladi Level 3 on Colors TV.

He was the editor and host of a cricket analysis series called Cricinfo Runorder, a bi-weekly show featuring former cricketers.

He took part in the second season of Bigg Boss OTT in June 2023.

=== Actor ===
Broacha acted in films like Jalwa, 99, Little Zizou, Fruit and Nut, Mumbai Chakachak, The Shaukeens, and Roy.

=== Author ===
In January 2010, he released his book Karl, Aaj aur Kal, a semi-autobiographical comedy about celebrities, Bollywood and politics. In 2011, he released another book, The Average Indian Male, an account of the Indian male commonly referred to as the "aam aadmi".

=== Podcaster ===
In 2015, he started hosting a podcast called Cyrus Says or C& Bull, produced by IVM network. This is a show about life in urban India, politics, sports, civic sense and current affairs.

Cyrus Broacha is currently hosting a podcast series titled A Century of Stories: Cricket on the YouTube channel "A Century of Stories." In this series, he reminisces about memorable moments from the history of cricket, blending humor with insightful commentary. The podcast features discussions with notable guests, and explores significant events, legendary players, and cultural shifts that have shaped Indian cricket over the decades.

== Personal life ==
Cyrus Broacha is married to Ayesha, a photographer. The couple has two children.

== Filmography ==
=== Films ===
Year	Title	Role	Notes	Ref.
1987	Jalwa	Jyothi's younger brother		
2008	Little Zizou			
2009	Mumbai Chakachak	OK		
2009	99	Zaramud		
2009	Fruit and Nut	Jolly Maker		
2014	The Shaukeens			
2015	Roy	Himself		

=== Television ===
Year	Title	Role	Notes	Ref.
1996–1998	MTV Land	Host		
1996–1998	MTV Made in India	Host		
1997–1998	MTV Recycled	Host		
1997–1998	MTV U	Host		
1999–2006	MTV Bakra	Host		
1999–2000	Hello Friends	Cyrus		
2006–2023	The Week That Wasn't	Host		
2007	Jhalak Dikhhla Jaa	Contestant	9th place	
2007–2008	Champion Chaalbaaz No.1	Judge		
2010	Fear Factor: Khatron Ke Khiladi 3	Contestant	10th place	
2010–2011	MTV Bakra Returns	Host		
2012	Greenathon	Host		
2021	LOL: Hasse Toh Phasse	Contestant	6th place	
2023	Bigg Boss OTT	Contestant	11th place (Quit)	
