= Mirch =

- Promotional poster for the film
- Directed by: Vinay Shukla
- Written by: Vinay Shukla
- Produced by: Reliance Big Pictures
- Starring: Konkona Sen Sharma; Raima Sen; Shahana Goswami; Ila Arun; Shreyas Talpade; Arunoday Singh; Boman Irani; Prem Chopra; Tisca Chopra; Pitobash
- Cinematography: Sudhakar Reddy Yakkanti
- Edited by: Sankalp Meshram
- Music by: Monty Sharma
- Distributed by: Reliance Big Pictures
- Release date: 17 December 2010
- Running time: 105 minutes
- Country: India
- Language: Hindi

Mirch (transl. Chilli) is a 2010 Indian anthology and Sex comedy-drama film written and directed by Vinay Shukla. The film featured Konkona Sen Sharma and Raima Sen in pivotal roles. The film began filming in Bikaner, Rajasthan.

According to Shukla, the subject of the film is gender equality and women's sexuality. The film revolves around four short stories subjected to issues of women's emancipation, based on a story from the Panchatantra which travels in its various versions to modern times. Konkona Sen Sharma and Raima Sen star in two of these short stories. The film premiered at the I View Film Festival on 26 September 2010. The film had its theatrical release on 17 December 2010.

== Plot ==
Maanav (Arunoday Singh) is a struggling filmmaker who will not compromise on the script he has written. His girlfriend Ruchi (Shahana Goswami), a successful film editor, arranges for him to meet film producer Nitin (Sushant Singh). Nitin likes the script but is not very sure of its box office potential. Maanav then suggests a story from the Panchtantra: A woman is caught red-handed with her lover by her husband and yet, she manages to wriggle out of it Scot-free! Nitin loves the story but finds it too short for a feature film. Maanav then creates three more stories based on the same premise: in a way, the Panchantra story travels in different versions to the modern times through the film. The four stories are woven together by a common story. Mirch itself echoes this structure, with four stories mingling with the main narrative.

1st Story.

Kashi(Rajpal Yadav) is a craftsman in India in ancient time. He has a beautiful wife Maya (Raima Sen) who loves him with passion. He receives an invitation from the king to work in the palace. He tells Maya that it is a great opportunity because if the king likes his work, they can become rich. She is upset because she does not want to be alone, but Kashi convinces her. In the afternoon Kashi's friend teases him that his wife is too pretty for him to handle and she will definitely call in another man the moment Kashi leaves for the city. Kashi furiously dismisses it but gets suspicious. He hides near in his house to observe his wife. His friend comes home asking for Kashi. Maya says husband is not at home. The friend then asks for water, which Maya passes to him(without opening the door), he tries to make advances towards her but she throws water on his face and he runs away.

Kashi is happy that his wife is extremely faithful to him. He sneaks under the bed to surprise her. Maya then enters the room with a hunky prince (Arunoday Singh). She suddenly realises that her husband is hiding under the bed. She then fabricates a story of how she was told by the astrologer that her husband has bad luck on him and he shall die within a few days. To avoid this she must consummate with another man so that the bad luck is diverted towards the second man. The prince plays along saying that being a kshatriya he is born to protect others and he is "obligated to do his duty".

Kashi now in dilemma, whether to stop them and bear the "bad luck" or helplessly have his wife make love to another man right on the bed he that he is hiding under.

2nd story

This story is set in medieval times in Rajput Kingdom. Raja Nirgun Singh (Prem Chopra), aged 70, has a young wife Lavni (Konkana Sen). Lavni is not satisfied with this marriage and discusses this with her maid Kesara (Ila Arun). Kesara tells her that it is not uncommon for queens to ask for "services" from young and reliable subjects. Lavni tells her that she likes Chandresh (Arunoday Singh), who is one of the King's subjects and is a close friend of the King. Kesara passes on the message to Chandresh, who refuses it saying he cannot do this because this would be cheating on the king (he cannot tell the king about the queen's advances either as this would mean a death sentence). Kesara tells him that he shall be rewarded very generously by the Queen. On hearing this, Chandresh says that he is agreeable but he has a few conditions and shall reveal them one by one. All these conditions require completion of seemingly impossible tasks which he puts forward just to deter the Queen. But Lavni completes these tasks (from plucking the tooth of the king to getting rid of the king's pet cat). He sees the Queen's desperation and places one last task, that whatever "happens" must happen in front of the King. The Queen says yes to this one as well.

One night the king and queen are sitting in the garden. Chandresh walks in and the queen asks him to fetch fruit from the tree in the garden. Chandresh climbs the tree and comes down asking for apology. The king asks him for what he saw, Chandresh replied that he saw the king and queen in sexual embrace. The queen rejects that claim angrily, saying that this is something that has never ever happened, leave alone now (humiliating the king in the process). Chandresh says that, even then, his vision *can* still happen, if the tree is possessed by a spirit. Lavni dismisses that as a fairy tale, and instigates the king to verify this for himself. The old King, now with mixed feelings of embarrassment and anger, climbs the tree. Being old and frail, he climbs up with some difficulty and then gets stuck on top of the tree and can not easily come down. Meanwhile, Chandresh and Lavni down below get into a sexual embrace.

The king sees them in the act from up on the tree but is still unable to climb down the tree. When the king does eventually manage to come down, he sees the queen and Chandresh are fully dressed and sitting normally as if nothing had happened. The king is convinced that the sexual embrace he saw was just an unreal vision and orders the tree to be cut down, declaring it possessed.

3rd Story

Manjul (Shreyas Talpade) and Manjula (Raima Sen) are a seemingly perfect couple living in modern-day Mumbai. Manjul is a prankster by nature who likes to take challenges. During a party, he claims that he can take up disguise and change his mannerism that even those close to him cannot recognise it. To prove his point he plans a prank. He tells his wife that he is working in office, and his old client shall be coming home for dinner. His career depends on this so she must treat the boss well. Manjula unaware of it welcomes the boss (manjul in disguise as an old man). Serves him food (the dishes told by Manjul which he said the boss loves). The boss makes sexual advances towards her and Manjula gets upset and locks herself in the bathroom telling the boss to leave. Manjul then reveals his prank and Manjula comes out. Manjul later asks her jokingly that she did not please the boss despite the career opportunity in return, to which Manjula jokes that who would fall for an old haggard man.

This puts another plan in the mind of Manjul. After a few months he claims he is going out of town for work. He disguises himself again as Mark (this time as a dark complexioned young south Indian man) claiming to be a college time friend of Manjul. He befriends Manjula, winning her trust. He does everything Manjula complains that Manjul does not employ, while also boasting how he was better than Manjul in every aspect. Manjula unaware of it just laughs it out. This goes on for two days. Mark (Manjul) finally approaches Manjula claiming that she deserves better to which Manjula refuses saying that he might be better but he is not the one. On this Manjul reveals his identity. Manjula gets upset saying that Manul is trying to test her love, and he does not have faith in her. This causes a rift between them, and their relationship is estranged.

One year later, the couple has a really strained relationship, they do not talk to each other. Manjul has become a workaholic, while Manjula tries to seek solace in Art. One day in an art gallery she meets a painter (Arunoday Singh) who praises her beauty and offers to make her the model of his paintings. After a conversation of arts Manjula accepts his offer and over the course of time they come close.

Manjula now has an affair with the painter. One day when Manjul is leaving for the Airport to attend a meeting, Manjula calls the painter home. They are in bed when Manjul suddenly finds that he has forgotten his tickets, he returns home, and quietly enters the house (it was late night, not to wake her up). He is shocked to find Manjula in bed with another man to which Manjula blatantly replies "I thought it is you again in a disguise."

Story 4

Asu Hotmal (Boman Irani) says good bye to his wife Anita (Konkana Sen) who is not happy that her husband has to go out of town again and again for business. On the way, as Asu chitchats with the cab driver, he reveals that he regrets that he got married and that the bachelors have more fun. He then goes to a hotel where he asks the butler for a hooker. The hooker arrives dressed in a Burka. Asu offers her drink and food, the hooker reveals herself as Anita. Caught in an embarrassing situation, she turns the tables on him and angrily questions why he felt the need to seek another woman and that she turned up as a hooker just to catch him in the act after her friend Sakina saw him check into the hotel. Then, she locks herself in the bathroom where she calls her pimp, telling him he has accidentally set her up with her own husband. To fix the situation, she gets the pimp to burst in and tell Asu that due to police monitoring going on tonight, he is not going to be able send the hooker. Anita, while still in the locked bathroom puts some Glycerine in her eyes to fake the tears and then comes out crying saying she now no longer wants to be with him. Asu falls to his knees begging that he has made a mistake and shall do anything to make up for it. Anita forgives him and they hug. Then, Anita asks Asu how much was he going to pay for "the service" tonight. Asu replies 2,000. Anita coldly says that, in that case, for him to make up for tonight, she wants jewellery worth 200,000 from him. Asu agrees immediately.

The producer Nitin, who was enjoying the stories seems visibly upset after the fourth one. He quickly walks out of office and tells maanav that he shall call him about it. He angrily reaches home and it is revealed during an argument with his wife Seema (Tisca Chopra) that he had been in a similar situation just like the fourth story. He asks Seema what is the truth, to which Seema replies that it is for him to decide. Nitin then hugs his wife, realising it is better not to dig up past grudges as it will ruin their relationship.

Ruchi in the last scene informs Maanav that the producer has approved his story and they celebrate.

== Cast ==
- Shreyas Talpade as Manjul
- Konkona Sen Sharma as Lavni / Anita
- Raima Sen as Maya / Manjula
- Ila Arun as Kesar
- Sushant Singh as Nitin
- Boman Irani as Asu Hotmal
- Prem Chopra as Raja Nirgun Singh
- Tisca Chopra as Seema
- Pitobash as Madan / Chedimal
- Saurabh Shukla as Satish
- Rajpal Yadav as Kashi
- Shahana Goswami as Ruchi
- Arunoday Singh as Maanav Prithvi Singh / Abhijit
- Pushkar Shrotri as Kaushal Bhatt
- Mahie Gill as dancer in closing song

== Reception ==
Upon release, Mirch received mixed reviews from film critics.

Filmfare gave the movie a four star rating stating Mirch is a good showcase for the yet undermined talent of its lead actors. While the women are on top, the movie is a little ho hum like missionary.

Taran Adarsh of Bollywood Hungama wrote, "Mirch has two stories in the first half (great) and two stories in the second (disappointing), while the fifth one, which binds all the earlier tales, is a downer as well. Eventually, it falls short of expectations!" He added, "Mirch blends the serious issue of gender equality with the comic flavour of the film well, at least in the first half. But it's the post-interval portions that act as a downer and in turn, makes this Mirch not as spicy."

Rajeev Masand of CNN IBN gave it a two and a half star rating explaining "a stronger male lead and some tighter editing might have turned this into a crackling film. As it stands now, it's as appetizing as a half-cooked meal!", and praising the performances by the lead actresses Raima Sen and Konkona Sen Sharma as sexually liberated women.

Anupama Chopra of NDTV, feels that the director has failed to depict the good theme well. "Mirch is a sexy idea that doesn’t quite come to fruition, she wrote. "Despite some good moments and smart writing, Mirch isn't the spicy romp it could’ve been. I’m going with two and a half stars," she added.

== Soundtrack ==
Mirch

Soundtrack album by Monty Sharma
- Released: 2 December 2010
- Genre: Film soundtrack
- Label: T-Series
- Producer: Monty Sharma

The film's songs and film score were composed by Monty Sharma, who had worked on Sanjay Leela Bhansali's previous film Saawariya. The lyrics are penned by Javed Akhtar. The soundtrack is getting positive reviews from critics.

Track list
No.	Title	Artist(s)	Length
1.	"Kaare Kaare Badra"	Shankar Mahadevan
2.	"Mann Bhi Hai"	Bela Shende
3.	"Mora Saiyyan"	Ila Arun, Girish Chattopadhyay and Chaaru Semwaal
4.	"Tikhi Tikhi Mirch (Folk Version)"	Kalpana Patowary
5.	"Tikhi Tikhi Mirch (Western)"	Akriti Kakar
6.	"Zindagi Tu Hi Bata"	Kunal Ganjawala, Vaishali Samant and Sharmishtha

== Accolades ==
- Won- I-View 2010 Engendered Award for Outstanding Cinema (Popular Choice Award)

Award Ceremony	Category	Recipient	Result	Ref.(s)
3rd Mirchi Music Awards	Raag-Inspired Song of the Year	"Kaare Kaare Badra"	Won	
3rd Mirchi Music Awards	Raag-Inspired Song of the Year	"Mann Bhi Hai"	Nominated	
