= Chaarfutiya Chhokare =

- Movie poster
- Directed by: Manish Harishankar
- Written by: Manish Harishankar
- Produced by: Sunill Khosla & Vibha Dutta Khosla
- Starring: Soha Ali Khan; Harsh Mayar; Seema Biswas; Mukesh Tiwari; Zakir Hussain; Suhas Sirsat; Lekh Tandon; Umesh Jagtap
- Cinematography: V. Balajee
- Edited by: Manish Harishankar
- Music by: Abhijeet-Sameer & Sudeep Banerjee
- Release date: 26 September 2014
- Running time: 119 minutes
- Country: India
- Language: Hindi

Chaarfutiya Chhokare (transl. Four-feet-short boys) is a 2014 Indian Hindi-language thriller film, written and directed by Manish Harishankar and produced by Sunill Khosla and Vibha Dutta Khosla. The storyline is based on the subject of child-trafficking. The film features Soha Ali Khan, Seema Biswas and Zakir Hussain. The film was released on 26 September 2014, to mixed reviews.

== Plot ==
The plot revolves around Neha Malini (Soha), who is a non-resident Indian returning to India in order to start a school in a village in north Bihar. Starting off optimistic and happy about her endeavor, she is unaware of the hardships, obstructions, and risks awaiting her in this small, serene village.

She is pleased after meeting three boys, Awadhesh, Hari and Gorakh but soon finds out that it is the beginning of a nightmare. Being hardcore criminals, these three boys become the center of her activities. After seeing this, she vows to stop the criminal and sexual exploitation of the children in the village. Her meeting with Janaki (Seema Biswas) – the mother of one of the boys, Awadhesh – helps her understand the deeply embedded political-criminal nexus that pervades the system. Neha is resolute to free the three of them from this world of crime.

== Cast ==
- Soha Ali Khan as Neha Malini
- Seema Biswas as Janki
- Lekh Tandon as Kailash babu
- Zakir Hussain as Lakkhan
- Aditya Jaiswal as Hari
- Govind Namdev
- Mukesh Tiwari as Baal Kishan
- Shankar Mandal as Gorakh
- Harsh Mayar as Awdesh

== Soundtrack ==
The soundtrack was composed by Abhijit Vaghani and Sudeep Banerjee.

=== Track listing ===
No.	Title	Music	Singer(s)	Length
1.	"Haldi Ke Rang"	Sudeep Banerjee, Abhijit Vaghani, D. Sameer	Sharda Sinha	0.53
2.	"Saiyyan Mile"	Abhijit Vaghani, D. Sameer	Malini Awasthi	6:36
3.	"Vidya Ki Parasmani"	Abhijit Vaghani, D. Sameer	Vibha Dutta Khosla	5:47
4.	"Kaun Si Nagariya"	Sudeep Banerjee	Sharda Sinha	6.47
5.	"Mast Malang"	Sudeep Banerjee	Sudeep Banerjee	2.58
Total length:				0:21:44
