= Kunal Vijaykar =

Indian food writer and television presenter

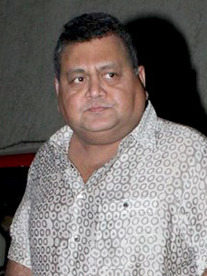
- Born: 19 May 1964 (age 62)
- Education: St. Mary's School, Mumbai; Sir J.J. Institute of Applied Art
- Occupations: Food writer, YouTuber, actor and television personality
- Known for: Khaane Mein Kya Hai; The Foodie – with Kunal Vijayakar

YouTube information
- Channel: Khaane Mein Kya Hai
- Subscribers: 669 K
- Last updated: 05 January 2025

Kunal Vijaykar (born 19 May 1964) is an Indian broadcaster, food writer, author, actor, and television personality. He is also a YouTuber and his YouTube channel is called "Khaane Mein Kya Hai" (loosely translates to "What's for food?").

He is the anchor of the food show The Foodie – with Kunal Vijayakar, a show which ran for nine years, completing close to 500 episodes. He has been a food columnist and writer with The Times of India, Bombay Times, DNA, Asian Age, Mahanagar, and The Week and is currently a food writer and columnist with Hindustan Times. He is also the author of Made In India – his first cookbook. He was also the director of the satirical political show The News That Wasn't and The Week That Wasn't on CNN News18, along with regular collaborator and close friend Cyrus Broacha.

== Early life ==
He studied at St. Mary's School, Mumbai. He then received his bachelor's degree from Sir J.J. Institute of Applied Art, Mumbai.

== Career ==
Kunal started out in advertising and theatre and spent 11 years in a leading advertising agency. During that time he appeared in several English plays and various TV commercials. He appeared in supporting roles in many Hindi movies, including Duplicate (1998) by Mahesh Bhatt, Paisa Vasool (2004), and Salaam Namaste (2005) with Saif Ali Khan and Preity Zinta.

He played the role of a journalist in the Hindi film Ghajini (2008) and was seen as Kunal in Little Zizou (2009), a story of the Parsi community.

He was the host of the channel Times Now show titled The Foodie, which featured him travelling around the country sampling exotic foods. His weekly satire comedy show The Week That Wasn't, with comedian Cyrus Broacha on CNN IBN completed seventeen years. He does a sketch show with Cyrus Broacha, Cyrusitis, written and directed by Broacha.

Vijaykar debuted as a screenwriter and director in 2009 with Fruit and Nut, a comedy starring Dia Mirza, Cyrus Broacha, Boman Irani, and Mahesh Manjrekar.

Since 2011, he also writes the fortnightly humour column "Funda Mental", in The Week magazine.

Has just written his first cookbook Made in India, published by Jaico.

== Filmography ==
=== Actor ===
- Duplicate (1998)
- Bollywood Calling (2001)
- Main Prem Ki Diwani Hoon (2003)
- Paisa Vasool (2004)
- Ab Tak Chhappan (2004)
- Jo Bole So Nihaal (2005)
- Salaam Namaste (2005)
- Ghajini (2008)
- Little Zizou (2009)
- Fruit and Nut (2009)
- Guilty (2020)
- Hello Charlie (2021)
- Vijay 69 (2024)

=== Director ===
- Fruit And Nut (2009)
