= Amit Mistry =

Indian actor (1974–2021)

- Born: 12 January 1974; Mumbai, Maharashtra, India
- Died: 23 April 2021 (aged 47); Andheri, Mumbai, India
- Citizenship: Indian

Amit Mistry (12 January 1974 – 23 April 2021) was an Indian drama, film and television actor. He had appeared in a number of tele serials, drama as well as films. He is mostly known for his appearance in Tenali rama, A Gentleman and Saat Phero Ki Hera Pherie.

== Biography ==
Mistry was born in 1974. He acted in theatre, TV shows and films. He was well known in Gujarati theatre. He played a role in Shor in the City, Saat Phero Ki Hera Pherie, Tenali Rama, Maddam Sir and in the Amazon Prime web series Bandish Bandits.

He died on 23 April 2021 in Andheri, Mumbai, following cardiac arrest.

== Filmography ==
Year	Film	Language	Character
2021	Bhoot Police	Hindi	GM Hari Kumar
2018	Bhaiaji Superhit	Hindi	Lucky Singh Laapata
2017	A Gentleman	Hindi	Jignesh Patel
2017	Chor Bani Thangaat Kare	Gujarati	Robin aka Rajkumar
2014	Bey Yaar	Gujarati	Pranav Doshi/Prabodh Gupta
2012	Gali Gali Chor Hai	Hindi	Sattu Tripathi
2011	Yamla Pagla Deewana	Hindi	Binde
2010	Shor in the City	Hindi	Tipu
2010	Phillum City	Hindi	Raju
2009	99	Hindi	Bhuval Ram Kuber
2007	Ek Chalis Ki Last Local	Hindi	Patrick
2000	Kya Kehna	Hindi	Priya's brother

=== TV shows ===
Serial	Character
Ssshhhh...Koi Hai - Tantrik	Ajay
Taarak Mehta Ka Ooltah Chashmah	Antakshari Host
Saat Phero Ki Hera Pherie	Parimal Desai
Woh	Ronnie
Yeh Duniya Hai Rangeen	Rahul
Shubh Mangal Savadhan	Andy
Bhagwaan Bachaye Inko	CK
Dafa 420	Bhola
Tenali Rama	Birbal
Maddam Sir	Vijay Chauhan
Tea Time Manoranjan	Various characters

=== Web series ===
Series	Character
Bandish Bandits	Devendra Rathod
