= Little Zizou =

- Directed by: Sooni Taraporevala
- Written by: Sooni Taraporevala
- Produced by: Dinaz Stafford; Sooni Taraporevala; Vandana Malik
- Starring: Boman Irani; Sohrab Ardeshir; Imaad Shah; Shernaz Patel; Zenobia Shroff; Dilshad Patel; John Abraham; Jahan Battivala; Iyanah Battivala
- Cinematography: Himman Dhamija
- Edited by: T.Woody Richman; Mahesh Boden
- Music by: Bickram Ghosh; Giuliano Modarelli
- Production company: Jigri Dost Productions
- Distributed by: Indian Films; Studio 18
- Release dates: 9 November 2008 (United States); 13 March 2009 (India)
- Running time: 96 minutes
- Country: India
- Languages: Hindi; Gujarati; English

Little Zizou is a 2009 Indian drama film written and directed by Sooni Taraporevala. Little Zizou is a comedy about how two battling Mumbai families finally come to terms.

Little Zizou won the Rajat Kamal in the National Film Award for Best Film on Family Welfare category at the 56th National Film Awards.

== Plot ==
Xerxes, 'Little Zizou' as he is known, is an eleven-year-old football-crazy Parsi boy whose fervent wish is that his idol, Zinedine Zidane, visit Mumbai. His older brother Artaxerxes, or Art, is a talented artist whose wild fantasies come to life in surprising ways. Their father Khodaiji is a self-proclaimed protector-of-the-faith who thrives on the attentions (and donations) of hopeful believers.

Art burns with unrequited love for Zenobe, the elder daughter of Khodaiji's arch rival, Boman Pressvala, a free thinking newspaper publisher. And to the extreme displeasure of their other daughter, Xerxes adores the maternal Mrs Pressvala. But the real fireworks begin when Pressvala writes a scathing critique of Khodaiji and public reaction is widespread. As the two households fight, life becomes complicated. Liana (the younger daughter) finally lets Xerxes be her friend. Khodaiji shuts down Presswala's office. Presswala gets a heart attack. Whether Khodaiji reforms his ways and if Pressvala lets Art court Zenobe forms the rest of the story.

== Cast ==
Actor	Role
Boman Irani	Boman Pressvala
Jahan Battivala	Xerxes "Little Zizou" Khodaiji
Iyanah Bativala	Liana Pressvala
Sohrab Ardeshir	Cyrus II Khodaiji
Imaad Shah	Artaxerxes "Art" Khodaiji
Shernaz Patel	Miss Patel
Zenobia Shroff	Roxanne Pressvala
Mahabanoo Mody-Kotwal	Majestic Grandmother
Kunal Vijaykar	Kunal
Tknow Francorsi	Tito Fellini
Kurush Deboo	Kurush Chief Disciple
Kamal Sidhu	Alka Mehta
Dilshad Patel	Zenobia Pressvala
John Abraham	Arjun (Special Appearance)

== Reception ==
Shubhra Gupta of Indian Express praised the performances of cast and called it "a film to be savoured".
