= Jalpari: The Desert Mermaid =

- Theatrical release poster
- Directed by: Nila Madhab Panda
- Screenplay by: Deepak Venkateshan, Kaustubh Tripathi
- Produced by: Sushilkumar Agrawal
- Starring: Lehar Khan; Parvin Dabas; Harsh Mayar; Kaustubh Tripathi; Rahul Singh; Krishang Trivedi
- Edited by: Apurva Asrani
- Music by: Kaustubh Tripathi - Deepak Pandit
- Production company: Ultra Films
- Distributed by: Ultra Distributors
- Release dates: July 2012 (Cannes); 31 August 2012 (India)
- Running time: 100 Minutes
- Country: India
- Language: Hindi

Jalpari: The Desert Mermaid is a 2012 Indian film directed by Nila Madhab Panda. Like I Am Kalam it is also a children's film where Lehar Khan, Krishang Trivedi and Harsh Mayar (who won the National Film Awards for the best child artist in 2010) are on lead as child artists and Parvin Dabas, Tannishtha Chatterjee, Rahul Singh, Suhasini Mulay and V.M. Badola are in supporting roles.

The movie centres on the issue of female foeticide and is an adventure film. It was screened at Marche du Cannes film festival.

The movie has been nominated at the prestigious Asia Pacific Screen Awards (APSA). The sixth APSA ceremony was organised at Queensland, Australia on 23 November 2012. The movie has been sent to the Academy of Motion Pictures as a direct entry for the Oscar Awards in the foreign film category. Recently the film received the prestigious Audience Choice Award in Minsk International Film Festival in Belarus, and selected as an official entry for International Film Festival in Montreal in March 2013. The film also won MIP Junior Kids Jury Award at Cannes in October 2012.

== Plot ==
A well-heeled family from a tiny neighborhood of New Delhi travels from the city through dusty roads that lead into the Madhogarh village, district Mahendragarh in Haryana, far out and buried in the debris of the past. Shreya, the tomboy of the family, finally arrives at her father's village for the first time during her vacations. In their imagination, she and her brother Sam, had spun the village right out of a fairytale, replete with streams, lakes, and grasslands that would allow them to run free. But all they find in reality are dusty alleys, dried-up ponds, and hostile playmates - until they spin their magic and befriend an unknown place, especially some of its people, like the Pehelwan and the gang of kids led by Ajithe.

The story revolves around Shreya and Sam's adventures and misadventures, which turn this dull place bereft of water into a land of enchantment, mischief, and a million exciting exploits. But unknown places have many secrets, and here too, secrets lurk at every corner. Strangely behaving villagers, a witch whom everyone seems to be terrified of, and a no-access zone beyond the hills intrigue Shreya, more so after housemaid Shabri tells her various mysterious stories about the village. Then, one night, Shreya sees Shabri and her husband Trilochan slink away and starts following them, only to find out a horrifying secret the village harbors. At the end, they are shocked to know that the village kills girl children before they are born and blames the witch.

== Cast ==
- Lehar Khan as Shreya
- Parvin Dabas as Dev
- Harsh Mayar
- Krishang Trivedi as Sam
- Tannishtha Chatterjee as Shabri (maid)
- Rahul Singh as Veera
- Suhasini Mulay as Dadi
- V.M. Badola
- Madhulika Sen as School Principal (Cameo)

== Release ==
This film was released on 31 August 2012.
