= Parvin Dabas =

Indian actor, director and model

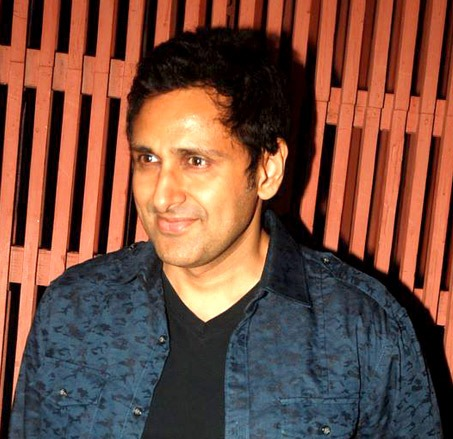
- Born: 12 July 1974 (age 52); Delhi, India
- Occupations: Actor, model and director
- Spouse: Preeti Jhangiani (2008–present)

Parvin Dabas (born 12 July 1974) is an Indian actor, director and model, who works predominantly in Hindi and English language films.

== Early life ==
Parvin Dabas was born on 12 July 1974. His family is from Kanjhawala, Outer Delhi. He studied in Modern School Vasant Vihar, New Delhi and then in Hans Raj College, Delhi University.

== Career ==
Dabas made his film debut in the 1999 film Dillagi and played a key role in the Malayalam film Ayyappantamma Neyyappam Chuttu along with Antara Mali the following year. His first major movie as an actor was Monsoon Wedding directed by Mira Nair and he has since appeared in many Bollywood films, including Tumse Milkar with Reshmi Ghosh.

He later starred in films such as The Hero: Love Story of a Spy, Maine Gandhi Ko Nahin Mara and Khosla Ka Ghosla for which he won acclaim. In 2005 he made a guest appearance (as Sudhanshu) in Sarabhai vs Sarabhai TV serial aired on STAR One in an episode directed by Deven Bhojani.

He directed his first film Sahi Dhandhe Galat Bande which released on 19 August 2011. He won a Bronze Palm Award at the 2011 Mexico International Film Festival and a Silver Remi Award at the Worldfest Houston 2011 (Houston International Film Festival). The film was selected for the Indian Panorama section of the International Film Festival of India 2011, held in Goa from 23 November to 3 December.

In February 2020 he launched the Pro Panja League tournament with Mr Kiren Rijuju (Sports Minister) and Olympic Boxing Star, Vijender Singh, launching it. The first full season with 6 teams of the Pro Panja League was held between 28 July – 13 August 2023 and was telecast live on Sony Sports Network, DD Sports and Fancode. Actor and Business Entrepreneur Mr. Suniel Shetty came on board as a minority stakeholder of the Pro Panja League in August 2023.

== Personal life ==
Dabas is also a trained scuba diver and underwater photographer. He married actress Preeti Jhangiani on 23 March 2008. They had a son, Jaiveer, on 11 April 2011. On 27 September 2016 they had their second child, Dev. The family lives in Bandra. Parvin dabas met with an accident on 21 September 2024 and was admitted to the ICU at Holy Family Hospital, Bandra.

== Filmography ==
Year	Film	Role	Language
1999	Dillagi		Hindi
2000	Ayyappantamma Neyyappam Chuttu	Lal	Malayalam
2000	Tapish	Tapish	Hindi
2001	Monsoon Wedding	Hemant Rai	Hindi
2003	The Perfect Husband		English
2003	The Hero: Love Story of a Spy	Salman	Hindi
2003	Tumse Milke Wrong Number		English
2004	Muskaan	Sharad	Hindi
2004	Kanchana Ganga		Kannada
2005	Yehi Hai Zindagi	Vijay	Hindi
2005	Kuchh Meetha Ho Jaye	Siddharth	Hindi
2005	Maine Gandhi Ko Nahin Mara	Siddharth	Hindi
2006	The Curse of King Tut's Tomb	Yunan Heikal	TV series English
2006	The Memsahib	Jayant Rathod/Vijay	Hindi
2006	Khosla Ka Ghosla	Chiraunjilal 'Cherry' Khosla	Hindi
2006	With Luv... Tumhaara	Rahul khanna	Hindi
2007	The World Unseen	Omar	English
2008	Sirf	Amit	Hindi
2008	Via Darjeeling	Bonny / Rahul	Hindi
2009	Yeh Mera India	Sameer Ali	Hindi
2010	My Name Is Khan	Bobby Ahuja	Hindi
2010	Tumse Milkar		Hindi
2011	Sahi Dhandhe Galat Bande	Rajbir	Hindi
2012	Jalpari	Dev	Hindi
2013	Ghanchakkar	Uttam	Hindi
2014	Ragini MMS 2	Rocks	Hindi
2016	Jab Tum Kaho		Hindi
2017	Indu Sarkar	IB Officer	Hindi
2017	Mirror Game	Professor Jay Verma	Hindi
2018	Kuldip Patwal: I Don't Do It!	Chief Minister Varun Chadda	Hindi
2021	State of Siege: Temple Attack	Colonel Nagar	Hindi
2024	Sharmajee Ki Beti	Vinod Sharma	Hindi

=== Television ===
- Hostages (2019) Hotstar
- Sarabhai Vs Sarabhai (2005) Star One
- Made in Heaven (season 2) (2023) Amazon Prime Video
- Andhera (2025) Amazon Prime Video

== Awards and nominations ==
List of Awards and Nominations
Year	Film	Award	Category	Result
2011	Sahi Dhandhe Galat Bande (Right Job Wrong Guys )	Mexico International Film Festival	Bronze Palm Award	Won
