= Shor in the City =

2010 Indian film produced by Ekta Kapoor and Shobha Kapoor

- Theatrical release poster
- Directed by: Raj Nidimoru; Krishna D.K.
- Written by: Raj Nidimoru; Krishna D.K. Sita Menon
- Produced by: Ekta Kapoor; Shobha Kapoor
- Starring: Sendhil Ramamurthy; Tusshar Kapoor; Nikhil Dwivedi; Preeti Desai; Sundeep Kishan; Pitobash; Radhika Apte; Girija Oak; Amit Mistry; Zakir Hussain
- Cinematography: Tushar Kanti Ray
- Edited by: Ashmith Kunder
- Music by: Songs: Sachin–Jigar; Harpreet; Background Score: Roshan Machado
- Distributed by: ALT Entertainment; Balaji Motion Pictures
- Release dates: October 2010 (Busan); 28 April 2011 (India)
- Running time: 112 minutes
- Country: India
- Language: Hindi
- Budget: ₹30 million (US$310,000)
- Box office: ₹43.9 million (US$460,000) (net domestic gross)

Shor in the City (transl. Chaos in the city) is a 2011 Indian Hindi-language crime drama film directed by Raj & DK and produced by Ekta Kapoor and Shobha Kapoor starring Tusshar Kapoor, Sendhil Ramamurthy, Preeti Desai, Girija Oak, Radhika Apte, Nikhil Dwivedi, Pitobash Tripathy, Sundeep Kishan (in his Hindi debut) and Amit Mistry.

The background score of the film was composed by Roshan Machado. The first look of the film was unveiled on 21 March 2011 while the film was released in India on 28 April 2011.

== Plot ==
Five prominent personalities in the city of Mumbai are the focus of the film. Tilak (Tusshar Kapoor) is a small-time publisher of unlicensed books along with his friends Mandook (Pitobash Tripathy) and Ramesh (Nikhil Dwivedi). They kidnap a famous author and force him to give the manuscript of his latest book to them so that they will be the first ones to publish it.

Abhay (Sendhil Ramamurthy) is a NRI who returns to India to start his own small business and meets Shalmili (Preeti Desai).

Sawan (Sundeep Kishan) is a young cricketer hoping to break into the under-22 Mumbai cricket team. The story focuses on their trials and tribulations as they battle life in the city of Mumbai during the chaotic period of the festival Ganesh Chaturthi.

The film attempts to address topics such as chance, the never-ending conflict between hope and despair, and self-actualization. The film begins with the song "Karma is a bitch," which fits with the major concept of the movie, in which the characters struggle to come to terms with their own actions. Abhay has a horrible past that isn't disclosed in the movie, but it's possible that he traveled to India to escape it. Tilak initially holds himself responsible for the injury of the child due to the bomb explosion that happens in the movie, which brings him closer to his wife and views life from a different perspective. The goons who traumatized Abhay eventually end up being shot by their own bullets on the day of Ganesha Visarjan.

Tilak gets a new life and finds his treasure at home. Sawan gives up the money he finds at the bank robbery and instead focuses on improving his game for cricket selections and gets support from Sejal (Sawan's partner) too. Ramesh is seen applying for jobs, and Mandook is protesting at a rally. Towards the end of the movie, all characters move on different paths.

== Cast ==
- Tusshar Kapoor as Tilak
- Sendhil Ramamurthy as Abhay
- Nikhil Dwivedi as Ramesh
- Preeti Desai as Shalmili
- Sundeep Kishan as Sawan "Sawi" Murthy
- Pitobash as Mandook
- Radhika Apte as Sapna
- Girija Oak as Sejal
- Amit Mistry as Tipu
- Zakir Hussain as Extortionist

== Production ==
Shor in the City was made on a budget of ₹3 Crore and ₹2.75 crore for P&A.

Girish Johar, the head of distribution and acquisition at Balaji Motion Pictures, said "We gave Shor in the City a tight release of around 500 screens across the country and the film found appreciation. It grossed around ₹3.85 crore in just 4 days and adding the revenue from non-theatrical rights, the whole investment on the film has been more than recovered."

== Soundtrack ==
The songs are composed by Sachin–Jigar. Two songs from Harpreet were taken from his Sufi compilation called Teri Justujoo released by Sony in 2008. Lyrics are penned by Sameer and Priya Panchal. Shor in the City Soundtrack Tops The Charts in few days. The song "Karma Is a Bitch" is influenced from Ida Maria's Bad Karma.

Shor in the City

Soundtrack album by Sachin–Jigar and Harpreet
- Released: 28 April 2011
- Recorded: 2008–2010
- Genre: Film soundtrack
- Label: Sony Music India
- Producer: Ekta Kapoor

Sachin–Jigar and Harpreet chronology
F.A.L.T.U. (2011)	Shor in the City (2011)	Hum Tum Shabana (2012)

=== Track listing ===
No.	Title	Lyrics	Music	Singer(s)	Length
1.	"Saibo"	Sameer; additional lyrics: Priya Panchal	Sachin–Jigar	Shreya Ghoshal, Tochi Raina	3:16
2.	"Karma Is a Bitch"	Sameer; additional lyrics: Priya Panchal	Sachin–Jigar	Suraj Jagan, Priya Panchal	3:18
3.	"Shor"	Sameer; additional lyrics: Priya Panchal	Sachin–Jigar	Mohan Kannan	4:09
4.	"Deem Deem"	Nishu	Harpreet	Shriram Iyer	2:43
5.	"Saibo" (Remixed by DJ Suketu featuring PaVaN)	Sameer; additional lyrics: Priya Panchal	Sachin–Jigar	Shreya Ghoshal, Tochi Raina	3:21

=== Bonus tracks ===
No.	Title	Lyrics	Music	Singer(s)	Length
6.	"Teri Justajoo"	Ravii	Harpreet Singh	Roop Kumar Rathod, Kshitij Tarey	4:35
7.	"Ujale Baaz"	Agnee	Agnee	Mohan	4:06
8.	"Bam Lahiri"	Kailash Kher	Kailasa	Kailash Kher	5:17

== Reception ==
=== Box office ===
Shor in the City nett. grossed ₹2.89 crore in India; it opened at around 10–15% in India.⁣

=== Critical response ===
The film was well received by critics.

Nikhat Kazmi of The Times of India awarded it four stars out of five and stated "With a zany screenplay (Raj Nidimoru and Krishna DK), excellent cinematography by Tushar Kanti Ray and peppy music by Sachin-Jigar, Shor in the City is another breaking-norm film from Ekta Kapoor".

Taran Adarsh of Bollywood Hungama gave it three and a half stars and wrote "Shor in the City belongs to one of those rare categories of movies with sensibilities that would not only entice the festival crowd and the cinema literate, but also lure the ardent moviegoer."

Aniruddha Guha of the Daily News and Analysis gave it three stars and said "Shor in the City is the kind of reassuring film you yearn to watch amid, well, what 'Bollywood' has to offer every week. Also, it articulates something you have only probably thought before – 'Karma IS a bitch.'"

Rajeev Masand of CNN-IBN awarded three and a half stars saying "A delicious mix of quirky humor, gruesome violence, and surprising sensitivity, Shor in the City works on the strength of its smart script and consistent performances from its ensemble cast."

Rediff awarded the film four stars and said "Raj-Krishna's Shor in the City robotically registers itself in Indian cinema's history."

Anupama Chopra of NDTV gave the movie four stars and wrote "Shor in the City is a terrific film. It's surprising and disturbing and has a vein of rich, dark humor coursing through it."

Shubhra Gupta of the Indian Express gave it a three star rating and commented "What makes Shor in the City an instant clutter-breaker is its darkly comic treatment. It makes you smile because its humour comes from within. It's not grafted. And it's got heart : we feel for the characters."

Tushar Joshi of MiD DAY gave it a four star rating and wrote "Loaded with humor, sarcasm and wit. That truly is the beauty of the makers who succeed in arresting you with their tales. The spectacular climax is easily one of the best written in recent times."

Karan Anshuman of Mumbai Mirror gave it a four star rating, saying "Three stories, eleven days, myriad layers, believable characters, fine performances, spirited direction, taut script, momentary explosions of originality."

== Awards ==
Shor in the City was officially selected for the Busan International Film Festival and the Dubai International Film Festival in 2010. The film won the Best Director Award for Raj Nidimoru and Krishna DK at MIAAC in New York.

Year	Award	Category	Nominee(s)	Result
2012	Global Indian Music Academy Awards	Best Female Playback Singer	Shreya Ghoshal (For "Saibo")	Nominated
2012	Zee Cine Awards	Best Playback Singer – Female	Shreya Ghoshal (For "Saibo")	Won
2012	Filmfare Awards	Best Female Playback Singer	Shreya Ghoshal (For "Saibo")	Nominated
2012	Filmfare Awards	Best Supporting Actor	Pitobash	Nominated
2012	IIFA Awards	Best Performance in a Comic Role	Pitobash	Nominated
2012	Screen Awards	Best Comic Actor	Pitobash	Won
