= Ultra Media & Entertainment =

Indian Film production company

Ultra Media & Entertainment Pvt. Ltd.
- Company type: Private Company
- Industry: Film
- Founded: 1982
- Founder: Sushilkumar Agrawal
- Headquarters: Mumbai, India
- Products: Movies
- Number of employees: 250
- Subsidiaries: Ultra Jhakaas
- Website: www.ultraindia.com

Ultra Media & Entertainment Pvt. Ltd., formerly known as Ultra Distributors, is an Indian film company founded in 1982. It started out in home video distribution and expanded into film production and theatrical releases. Ultra has a library of over 1500 titles of award-winning and blockbuster feature films, TV dramas, animation, music and digital content. The company's production services include scanning, restoration, colorization, 2D to stereoscopic 3D conversion and merchandising.

== Film production ==
It produced the films Yash released in 1996 and Jalpari, released in 2012.

== Restoration ==
The company has restored and digitized classic Hindi movie Pyaasa, which was directed by Guru Dutt. As per the report, the original camera negative had come to them from the archives completely melted, with parts damaged or lost. After several clean-ups, they managed to retrieve the actual content from the original camera negative. 45 restoration experts worked for almost 4 months over 2 lakh frames (200,000). The original monaural soundtrack was remastered at 24-bit from the 35 mm optical soundtrack. The company has submitted it for the Venice Film Festival of 2015, where it was released in the Restored Classic section of the festival. Apart from Pyaasa, the company has also restored Raj Kapoor's Chori Chori, Kishore Kumar's Half Ticket and Shammi Kapoor's Dil Tera Deewana.

== Streaming services ==
The company has also ventured in the OTT space with focus on regional Indian languages. They have launched the app Ultra Jhakaas for exclusive Marathi language content thus becoming one of the early dominant players in the segment. Along with this, they have launched their apps Ultra Play for Hindi language movies & web-series with Ultra Gaane for music videos.

== Subsidiaries ==
Apart from entertainment business company has also made a strong presence in Soft Toys market in India. Ultra Toys & Gifts Pvt Ltd is a part of the Ultra Media and Entertainment Group, which has manufacturing units at Mumbai & Noida. This company is a licensing partner of British company Smiley World in India. The company launched a over-the-top platform Ultra Jhakaas on 22 March 2023, which provides digital content in Marathi.
