= Sahi Dhandhe Galat Bande =

- Directed by: Parvin Dabas
- Produced by: Preeti Jhangiani; Very Fishy Films
- Starring: Parvin Dabas; Sharat Saxena; Vansh Bharadwaj; Anupam Kher; Ashish Nayyar; Kuldeep Ruhil
- Music by: Siddharth Suhas & Dhruv Dhalla
- Release date: 19 August 2011
- Country: India
- Language: Hindi

Sahi Dhandhe Galat Bande (transl. Right Businesses Wrong Guys) is a 2011 Indian Hindi-language action film directed by Parvin Dabas in his directorial debut, starring Anupam Kher and Sharat Saxena. Produced by Very Fishy Films, the film was released on 19 August 2011. As per some news websites Parvin Dabas got the title of the film from Twitter.

== Plot ==
Sahi Dhandhe Galat Bande is the story of a gang composed of four friends: Rajbir (Parvin Dabas), Sexy (Vansh Bharadwaj), Ambani (Ashish Nayyar), and Doctor (Kuldeep Ruhil), who are given a job that will give them enough money to make all their dreams come true, but to achieve the same, they will have to go against their conscience and the village, Kanjhawla, to which they belong. Goading them on to make this job successful is their boss, Fauji (Sharat Saxena), who stands to gain the most from the job's success and realize his dreams of becoming a politician.

On the road to completing this mission, they come across a multitude of crazy characters, which include a guru and his wrestlers, a bunch of smart-ass kids, a raging Chief Minister (Kiran Juneja), a Scheming Businessman (Anupam Kher), the Leader of the Villagers (Yashpal Sharma (actor), an angry aunt (Neena Kulkarni), a college-going athlete (Udit Khurana), and a photographer girlfriend (Tena Desae) who wants to move on with her life while dealing with a boss who wants them to break his opponents legs and make mobile videos of it for evidence!

== Cast ==
- Parvin Dabas .... Rajbir
- Vansh Bhardwaj .... Sexy
- Ashish Nayyar as Mr. Ambani
- Kuldeep Ruhil .... Doctor
- Sharat Saxena .... Fauji
- Kiran Juneja .... Chief Minister
- Yashpal Sharma .... Malik
- Anupam Kher .... Agarwal
- Neena Kulkarni .... Tai
- Tena Desae .... Neha Sharma
- Vipin Sharma .... Rawat
- Udit Khurana .... Hitu Gulati
- Preeti Jhangiani .... Shalini Mehta

== Production ==
This movie has a couple of scenes which, were shot in Hansraj College, where Parvin Dabbas (the director) and the new actor, Udit Khurana have studied. The Director also had a special screening of the film at Hans Raj College.

== Reception ==
=== Critical response ===
The film has received mostly positive reviews. Daily Bhaskar gave it 3 stars. Aniruddha Guha from DNA gave it 3 stars saying that it is like a pocket dynamite. Movie talkies also gave 3 stars to the movie appreciating the efforts of actor turned director Parvin Dabas. nikhat kazmi from the times of India gave it three stars saying it was a serious and sensible debut from director parvin dabas.moviezadda.com gave it four stars and supergoodmovies gave it three and a half stars.sify.com called it 'relevant and great fun'. DNA after hrs gave it three stars with a 'sahi hain yeh bande'.critic subash k jha called it 'unique cinema' and the Mumbai Mirror's Karan Anshuman called it 'engaging cinema with soul' and gave it three stars.

There were also some negative reviews. Shaikh Ayaz of rediff.com was highly critical of the film, saying that it turns a serious issue into a high school joke within minutes. koimoi.com also gave it a negative review though they did state 'watch it because it is an honest attempt'.

wogma.com states that the average of 19 reviews is 3.4/5, with 9 yays, 2 nays and 8 so-so.

The theatrical run of SDGB was hugely affected by the anti-corruption dharna by Anna Hazare who was released from jail the same day as the film's release, aug19th.quite a few publications noted that that week's movie releases were hampered by the mood of the country when people were not in the mood to go to the theatres but were rather engaged in or following the anti-corruption movement as it unfolded.

== Awards ==
The movie was awarded a Bronze Palm in The Feature Film Category in the 2011 Mexico International Film Festival. It also received a Silver Remi Award For First Feature Film for director Parvin dabas at the Worldfest Houston 2011 (Houston International Film Festival). It was selected for the Indian Panorama section of the International Film Festival of India 2011, held in Goa from 23 November to 3 December.
