= Gulzar Khan =

- Location within Pakistan
- Coordinates: 31.1°N 67.10°E
- Country: Pakistan
- Province: Balochistan
- Elevation: 2,384 m (7,822 ft)
- Time zone: UTC+5 (PST)

Gulzar Khan is a village of Pishin District in the Balochistan province of Pakistan. It is located at 31°1'40N 67°10'5E to the north of the district capital Pishin with an altitude of 2384 metres (7824 feet).
