= Nila Madhab Panda =

Indian film director

- Occupations: Filmmaker, director
- Years active: 1998 – present
- Honours: Padma Shri (2016)

Nila Madhab Panda is an Indian film producer and director. Panda has directed and produced over 70 films, documentaries, and shorts based on social issues, such as climate change, child labor, education, water issues, sanitation and other developmental issues in India. Many of his films are based on his own experiences. He has won several awards and received critical acclaim for his films which have been described as "entertaining yet socially relevant."

== Early life ==
Panda was born in Odisha, and studied Entrepreneurship at IIM Bangalore.

== Career ==
Nila Madhab Panda is an Odia director and producer involved in making Hindi films, documentaries, short films and public service advertising campaigns. He has served on the juries of national and international film festivals, such as International Film Festival of India (IFFI). He started his career by assisting director Robin Romanov and producer Barbara Broccoli.

His first feature film I Am Kalam won 34 international awards along with a national award. His second feature film Jalpari (Desert Mermaid) received the MIP Junior award at Cannes. His project Kadvi Hawa (Dark wind) was critically acclaimed and received a national award. This is one of the first films that brought climate change into Indian cinema. His feature-length documentary God's own people narrated by Amitabh Bachchan connects between people's faith with tree and God.

Halkaa (Relief), a musical film with children, narrates a story about the Swachhata Abhiyaan (Clean India Mission) and the importance of sanitation. It won Best Film at the Grand Prix in Poland. In February 2021, Panda announced that his First Odia language film Kalira Atita had been submitted to the Oscars 2021 in the General Category and was available for Academy screening. However, the film did not make the cut for Oscar nominations.

== Direction ==
=== Feature films ===
Year	Title	Credited as			Notes	Ref(s)
Year	Title	Director	Producer	Writer	Notes	Ref(s)
2002	Swajaldhara	Yes	Yes		Documentary	
2005	Climates First Orphans	Yes	Yes		Documentary	
2010	I am Kalam	Yes		Yes		
2012	Jalpari	Yes				
2014	Babloo Happy Hai	Yes	Yes			
2015	Kaun Kitne Paani Mein	Yes	Yes	Yes		
2016	God's Own People	Yes			Documentary	
2017	Kadvi Hawa	Yes	Yes	Yes		
2018	Halkaa	Yes	Yes			
2019	Biju Babu		Yes			
2020	Kalira Atita	Yes	Yes			Odia film
2023	The Jengaburu Curse	Yes		Yes	TV series on SonyLIV	
2025	Spying Stars	No	Yes	No	Premiere at the BFF	

== Film awards ==
- Jalpari won MIP Junior award for best film, 2012, Cannes
- Viewers' Choice award at IFFLA, 2011
- Best Feature Film (I am Kalam) in Chicago International Children's Film Festival, 2011
- People's Choice Award at the Montreal International Children's Film Festival, 2011
- Best Feature Film award at Silent River Film Festival (SRFF), California, 2011
- Best Director award at Silent River Film Festival (SRFF), California, 2011
- Winner of the Don Quixote Prize of the International Cine Club Federations at the Lucas International Film Festival, Germany, 2010
- Winner of "Best feature film" at the Lucas International Film Festival, Frankfurt 2010
- "Special Jury mention" CineKid International Film Festivals 2010
- "International Jury's Special Mention" at the Ale Kino International Film Festival, Poland 2010
- Bronze Cairo for Best Feature at Cairo International Film Festival for Children, Cairo, 2012
- The Prize of the International Center of Films For Children & Young People (CIFEJ) at the Cairo International Film Festival for Children, Cairo, 2012
- Winner of "Best feature film" from the Indian Panorama by the Young Jury at the 41st International, Film Festival of India 2010
- Best Debut Director – Aravindam Purashkaram, 2011
- Golden Elephant Award for the Best Screenplay at 17th International Children's Film Festival, India,2011
- Best Feature Film in CMS International Film Festival, 2011
- "Audience Favorite choice" at the Barbican London Children Film Festival 2010
- Audience Favorite at Barbican London Children's Film Festival, 2011
- Best Feature Film, Dream Fest – Slatina, 2012
- Best Film (Halkaa) at the Grand Prix in Poland, 2018

== Other awards and recognition ==
- Padma Shri, 2016
- British Council - Creative Futures of India 2006 (Longest Journey award)
- UK Environment Film Fellowship 2005
- Heroism in Cinematography, 2003 THP, New York
- "Excellence in media" for fighting the cause female foeticide
- United Nations Visual Media fellowship 2002
- "Odisha icon" 2011
- "Living Legend" 2012
- "Son of Odisha" 2012
- "Bharat Gaurav (India's pride)" 2015
- Asia Pacific entrepreneurship award
- Karmaveer Purasakar
- 2021 - Jury member at 52nd International Film Festival of India, Goa 2021
