= I Am Kalam =

- Theatrical release poster
- Directed by: Nila Madhab Panda
- Screenplay by: Sanjay Chauhan
- Story by: Sanjay Chauhan
- Produced by: Santanu Mishra; Jitendra Mishra (Associate)
- Starring: Harsh Mayar; Gulshan Grover; Hussan Saad; Dharmveer Jakhar; Pitobash Tripathy; Beatrice Ordeix
- Cinematography: Mohana Krishna
- Edited by: Prashant Nayak
- Music by: Songs: Abhishek Ray; Madhuparna; Papon; Susmit Bose; Shivji Dholi; Background Score: Deepak Pandit
- Production company: Smile Foundation
- Distributed by: Ultra Films
- Release dates: 12 May 2010 (Cannes); 5 August 2011 (Indian)
- Running time: 87 minutes
- Country: India
- Language: Hindi
- Budget: ₹30 million (equivalent to ₹62 million or US$640,000 in 2023)
- Box office: ₹60 million (equivalent to ₹120 million or US$1.3 million in 2023)

I Am Kalam is a 2011 Indian Hindi-language drama film produced by the non-governmental charity Smile Foundation and directed by Nila Madhab Panda with cinematography by Mohana Krishna. The character of Chhotu has been performed by Harsh Mayar. The film was screened in the market section at the 63rd Cannes Film Festival on 12 May 2010. It has been showcased in various film festivals and has received many awards and honours. The film was screened retrospectively on 17 August 2016 at the Independence Day Film Festival jointly presented by the Indian Directorate of Film Festivals and Ministry of Defense, commemorating 70th Indian Independence Day.

== Cast ==
- Harsh Mayar as Chotu (later Kalam)
- Hussan Saad as Prince Ranvijay Singh
- Gulshan Grover as Bhati, Dhaba Owner
- Dharmveer Jakhar as Social Activist
- Beatrice Ordeix (French actress) as Lucy
- Pitobash Tripathy as Laptan
- Meena Mir as Chotu's/Kalam's mother
- Suresh Acharya as Lakha's assistant
- Biswajeet Bal as Sukha Singh
- Rajat Bhalla as Police Havaldar
- Garima Bharadwaj as Rani Sa
- Sanjay Chauhan as Raja Rudra Pratap Singh
- S.D. Chouhan as Ranvijay's worker

== Plot ==
This is the story of a boy, Chotu, from a poor family who works as a child labourer at a highway-side dhaba. Irrespective of the problems in his life, he is a happy child with a simple dream to become someone like President of India Dr. APJ Abdul Kalam.

The plot has the protagonist Chotu being sent to a dhaba to work and earn for the family. Here, he befriends the royal heir, Ranvijay, of a neighbouring resort's owner, who is of Chotu's age. Ranvijay's character showcases that money, royal blood, and luxury are a privilege but do not contribute to the happiness and joy childhood demands. A beautiful character of modern thoughts has been portrayed through Ranvijay, who doesn't believe in the caste system and protests against restricted education for the underprivileged. Moreover, the friendship between Chotu and Ranvijay glorifies the importance of having a true friend in life. Every day, Chotu dreams of wearing a tie and uniform to go to school, just like Ranvijay, as he has an unusual thirst for education and knowledge. Chotu then chances upon the Republic Day Parade and President of India Dr. APJ Abdul Kalam's salutation march. Curious, he finds out about the President of India Dr. APJ Abdul Kalam and instantly decides to become like him. From here, Chotu changes his name to Kalam.

As the story progresses, Kalam meets a foreign woman named Lucy who tries to convince his mother to let him study as he is a bright kid, but since the family's circumstances aren't in favour, he is denied an education. As a consequence, Kalam decides to run away to New Delhi to meet the President of India Dr. APJ Abdul Kalam and give him a letter. In this, he writes about how he wants to become like the President of India and thanks Dr. APJ Abdul Kalam for making him realise his dreams. Meanwhile, everyone from his family comes running after Kalam to find him in the new city. They finally track him down, and a relieved Ranvijay and jealous Kalam hug each other with joy.

In the end, Ranvijay's father offers Kalam's mother work at his resort, and he agrees to pay for Kalam's education and send Kalam to the same school where Ranvijay is studying. That is when Kalam says he wants to pay for his education on his own, and the movie ends with both Kalam and Ranvijay boarding the school bus in their school uniforms.

== Location ==
The film was shot in Bikaner, Rajasthan of India.

== Release ==
I Am Kalam released in India screens on 5 August 2011. A special screening was held for Former President of India Dr. A.P.J. Abdul Kalam at his residence at New Delhi on 29 July 2011. The film was acquired and distributed by Ultra Media & Entertainment.

== Reception ==
=== Critical response ===
Rajeev Masand of News18 praised the acting performances of all actors especially Harsh Mayar who played the character of Kalam. Masand also complimented the script which he felt was very well written because it integrated a very important message about education in its screenplay without being melodramatic. Masand gave the film a rating of 3.5 out of 5. Mayank Shekhar of Hindustan Times found the film to be "sweet and engaging" and gave it a rating of 3 out of 5 appreciating its realistic nature. Shubhra Gupta of The Indian Express gave the film a rating of 3.5 out of 5 while praising its good intentions and the performances of all actors. Namrata Joshi of Outlook praised the positive nature of the film but found the pacing to be slow. Namrata gave the film a rating of 2 out of 5 saying that "It’s a straight, simple story with no great highs and lows". Amy L. Hayden of Time Out found the film "heartwarming and inspirational" but felt that American kids might not be able to relate to it. The film was rated 4.60 on 5 by audiences at the Transilvania International Film Festival. The Times of India gave it 4.5 stars out of 5, commented " It's inspirational, intelligent, topical and entertaining too. More importantly, it brims over with heart and soul, leaving no one untouched with its simple message of providing an equal opportunity". DNA also gave it 4.5 out of 5 stars, saying "At a little over 90 minutes, I Am Kalam is a gripping watch that leaves you feeling uplifted and positive".

== Awards and nominations ==
- International Film Festival of India, Goa by Young Jury for Best Feature Film
- National Film Award for Best Child Artist 2011 – Harsh Mayar. He won it along with two other children
- Lucas Film Festival, Germany for Best Feature Film
- International Jury at Ale Kino International Film Festival, Poland for Special Mention
- Don Quixote Prize of the International Ciné-Club Federation (ICCF) at the Lucas Film Festival
- Special Diploma for the Best Actor Work at Minsk International Film Festival "Listapad", 2011
- Aravindan Award for Best Debutante Director
- 57th Filmfare Awards for Best Story to Sanjay Chauhan
- Best Child Actor award at Silent River Film Festival, California, 2011
- Special Mention to Harsh Mayar at the 17th International Children's Film Festival of India, 2011

=== Nominations ===
- Mumbai International Film Festival for Indian Frame Showcase
