= Desires of the Heart =

Desires of the Heart may refer to:

- Desires of the Heart (2008 film), a Chinese romantic comedy film
- Desires of the Heart (2013 film), an English independent film

== See also ==
- Dil Chahta Hai, or The Heart Desires, a 2001 Indian film by Farhan Akhtar
