= Pedestrian rights in India =

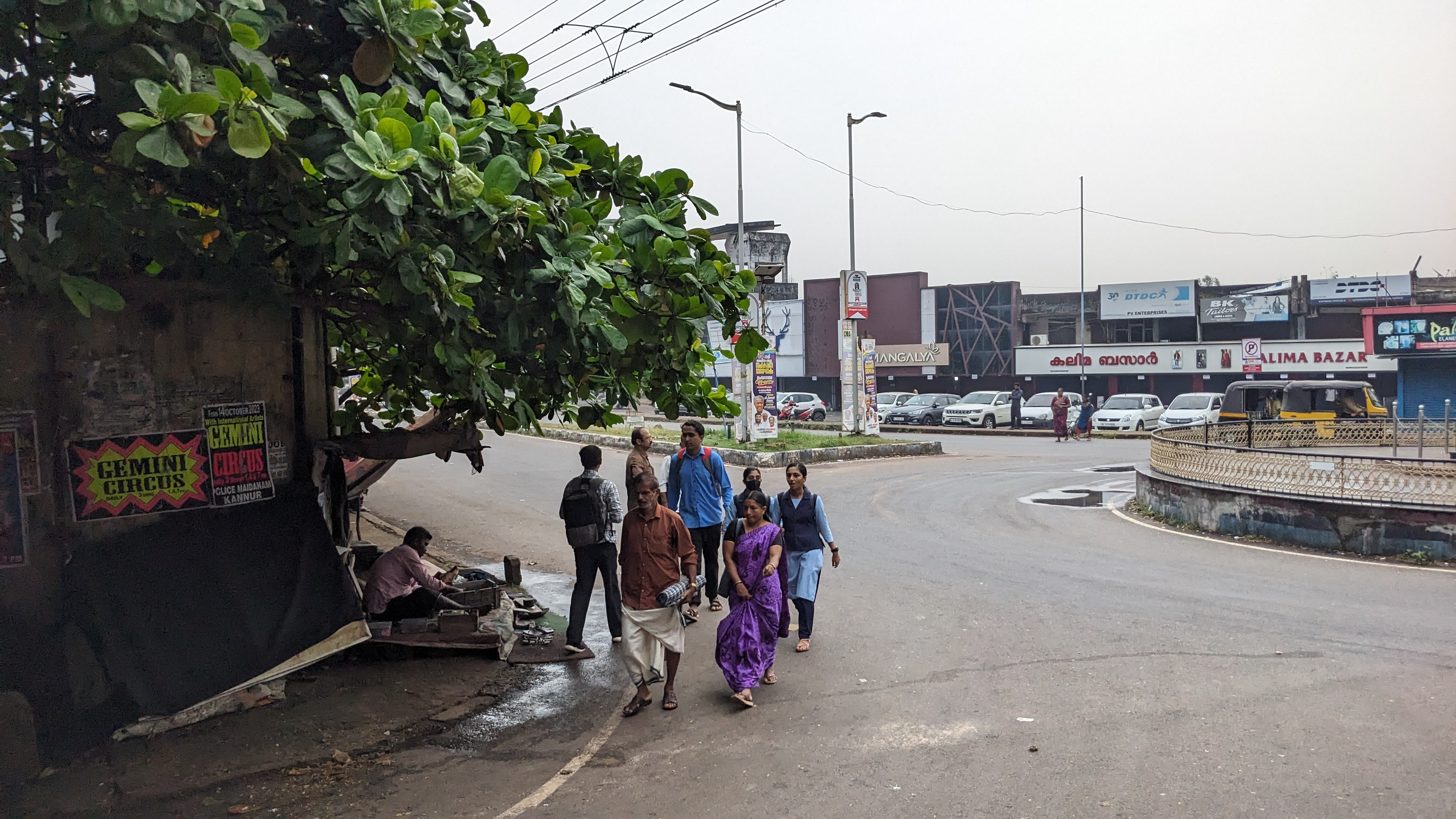
In the absence of safe pedestrian crossings, pedestrians are at risk while crossing roads

Pedestrian rights in India refer to the constitutional, statutory and judicial protections relating to people travelling on foot on public roads and other public spaces in India. Historically, pedestrian protection in India has been dispersed among constitutional guarantees, motor-vehicle legislation, road-safety regulations, judicial directions and local-government responsibilities. On 19 June 2026, the Supreme Court of India, in Maniyar Iliyaz @ Shaik Riyaz v. P. Ayyappan, expressly recognised the right to walk as a fundamental right, including a fundamental right to walk on demarcated footpaths, as a fundamental right taking priority over movement by motorised vehicles.

The judgment arose from a motor-accident compensation case involving the death of a five-year-old boy who was walking to school with his father on a road where there was neither a footpath nor a pedestrian crossing. The Court used the case to examine the broader constitutional status of walking and the duties of public authorities responsible for pedestrian infrastructure.

Although India's urban transport policy has historically emphasised private-vehicle infrastructure, walking and cycling together still account for a large share of urban trips, and pedestrians remain disproportionately represented among road-accident fatalities.

== Background ==
Before 2026, pedestrian protection in India rested on a combination of general constitutional rights and sector-specific statutes rather than a dedicated pedestrian-rights framework. The Indian Penal Code (1860) penalised rash or negligent driving that endangered other road users, and the Rules of the Road Regulations, 1989, imposed duties on drivers with respect to pedestrians. The Motor Vehicles Act, 1988 regulated vehicles, drivers and traffic but was not framed around pedestrian entitlements.

Road safety and pedestrian infrastructure were also the subject of continuing Supreme Court oversight in S. Rajaseekaran v. Union of India (Writ Petition (Civil) No. 295 of 2012), a long-running public-interest matter in which the Court issued periodic directions to Union and state authorities on road-safety measures, including footpaths and pedestrian crossings. On 14 May 2025, in proceedings connected to this matter, the Court directed the Centre and the states to frame guidelines ensuring that public roads have proper, accessible footpaths, and to remove encroachments on existing ones; it scheduled further hearings and later granted additional time for compliance. The Court separately addressed highway safety after fatal accidents in Phalodi, Rajasthan, and Rangareddy, Telangana, treating road-user safety as part of the State's obligations under Article 21 in In Re: Phalodi Accident v. National Highways Authority of India (2026 INSC 388).

It was against this background that the Supreme Court, in June 2026, moved from case-by-case directions to an express declaration that walking on a demarcated footpath is itself a fundamental right.

== Constitutional basis ==
Article 19(1)(d) of the Constitution of India guarantees citizens the right "to move freely throughout the territory of India", subject to permitted restrictions. Article 21 provides that no person shall be deprived of life or personal liberty except according to procedure established by law. In Maniyar Iliyaz @ Shaik Riyaz v. P. Ayyappan (2026 INSC 647), a bench of Justices P. S. Narasimha and A. S. Chandurkar held that the right to walk is a fundamental right under Part III of the Constitution, integral to the right to movement under Article 19(1)(d) and read together with Articles 19(1)(a), 19(1)(b), 19(1)(c) and Article 21. The Court held that this right specifically includes access to safe, demarcated footpaths, and that it is "primary" - taking priority over movement by motorised vehicles. The ruling thereby placed pedestrian access to footpaths within the constitutional framework of fundamental rights, rather than treating footpaths solely as a matter of municipal infrastructure or traffic management.

== 2026 Supreme Court judgment ==
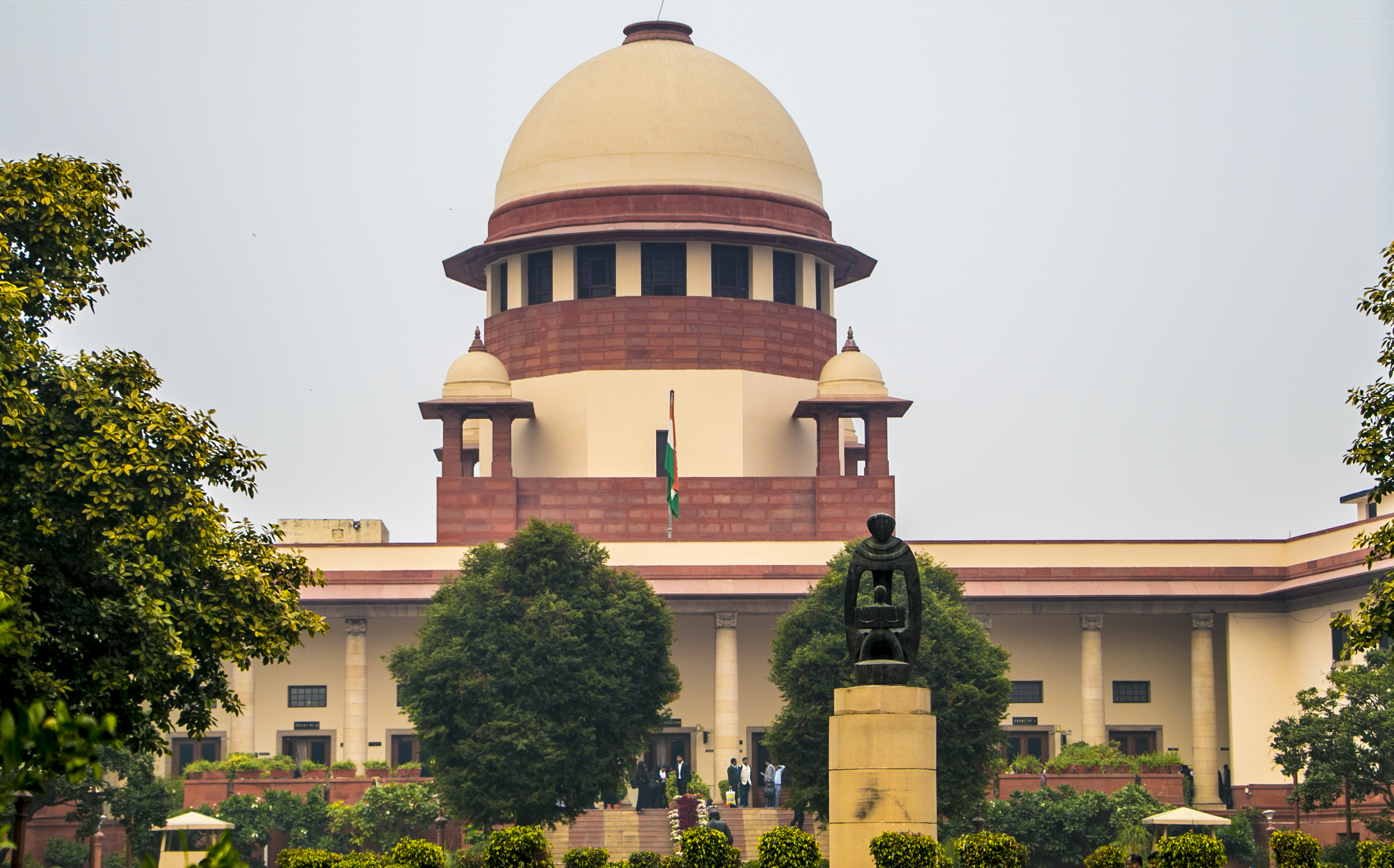
In 2026, the Supreme Court of India declared the right to walk as a fundamental right

=== Case overview and background ===
The judgment was delivered on 19 June 2026 in Civil Appeal Nos. 4665–4666 of 2025. The case concerned compensation for the death of a five-year-old child struck by a tanker while walking with his father to school, on a stretch of road without a footpath or pedestrian crossing.

The Motor Accidents Claims Tribunal had originally awarded the father ₹7.82 lakh with 6% annual interest; the High Court reduced this to ₹4.70 lakh. The Supreme Court held that the reduction was erroneous, recalculated the award at ₹11,44,628, and directed payment within two months.

=== Core legal propositions ===
The Court observed that walking had traditionally received inadequate legal and administrative recognition in a system organised largely around motor vehicles, and held that the Motor Vehicles Act, 1988, was not enacted as legislation recognising a fundamental right to walk.

The Court's central conclusions were:

- The right to walk is a fundamental right under Part III of the Constitution, including the right to safe, demarcated footpaths.
- Where a public road exists, urban development authorities, municipal corporations, municipalities and panchayats bear a corresponding constitutional duty to construct, maintain, demarcate and safeguard footpaths.
- Violation of the right to walk on a demarcated footpath can give rise to independent constitutional remedies, including restitution and compensation, distinct from remedies available under the Motor Vehicles Act, 1988.

The Court directed that the wider issue be re-registered as a petition under Article 32, titled Re: Fundamental Right to Walk and Footpath, and impleaded the Union ministries responsible for housing and urban affairs, rural development, and road transport and highways.

Damaged sidewalks and obstacles on sidewalks endanger the lives of pedestrians as they are forced onto the carriageway.

== Statutory framework and technical guidelines ==
Pedestrian protection outside the 2026 judgment continues to derive from several separate sources of law and technical guidance, rather than a single pedestrian-rights statute.

=== Constitution of India ===
The principal constitutional provisions identified by the Supreme Court include:

- Article 19(1)(d) - the right of citizens to move freely throughout the territory of India;
- Article 19(1)(a) - freedom of speech and expression;
- Article 19(1)(b) - the right to assemble peaceably and without arms;
- Article 19(1)(c) - the right to form associations or unions or co-operative societies; and
- Article 21 - protection of life and personal liberty.

The 2026 judgment treated walking as capable of engaging several of these rights, particularly where walking involves access to common public spaces, assembly, association or expression.

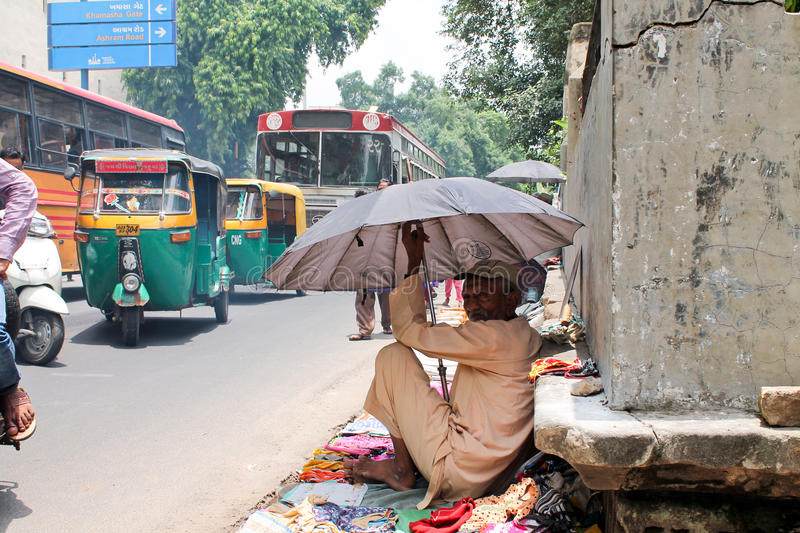
A hawker on a footpath in Ahmedabad, India

=== Motor Vehicles Act, 1988 ===
The Motor Vehicles Act, 1988 is the principal central legislation governing vehicles, drivers and traffic regulation.^{section 198A}

- Section 198A: Imposes penalties on designated authorities, contractors, and concessionaires for failures in road design and maintenance resulting in death or disability.^{section 198A}
- Section 138(1A): Empowers State Governments to formulate rules regulating pedestrian and non-motorized vehicle access in the interest of road safety.^{section 138(1A)}

The Supreme Court held in 2026 that the Motor Vehicles Act does not itself constitute legislation recognising the fundamental right to walk, characterising its pedestrian-related provisions as incidental to legislation primarily concerned with motor vehicles.

=== Motor Vehicles (Driving) Regulations, 2017 ===
The Ministry of Road Transport and Highways notified the Motor Vehicles (Driving) Regulations, 2017 on 23 June 2017. The regulations define a "road user" to include pedestrians and require drivers to take special care around vulnerable road users, including at pedestrian crossings.

The 2026 judgment noted that these provisions guide motorist conduct but do not themselves establish a constitutional right to walk or the priority of footpaths over motorised traffic.

=== Pedestrian protection norms ===
The AIS-100 regulation specifies minimum pedestrian protection criteria in case of impact with pedestrians. India's BNCAP safety rating system intends to incorporate pedestrian protection in its star rating calculation only from October 2027. However, both AIS and BNCAP norms only refer to safety with respect to impact, but do not cover the access to safe sidewalks and crossings.

=== Indian Roads Congress (IRC) Standards ===
Engineering execution of pedestrian infrastructure is guided by technical codes issued by the Indian Roads Congress (IRC) - notably IRC:103-2012, Guidelines for Pedestrian Facilities. These standards dictate appropriate footpath width, height limitations, surface paving textures, and criteria for pedestrian subways and foot-over-bridges. The guidelines require footpaths to feature a three-zone layout - a frontage zone, a clear obstacle-free pedestrian zone (minimum width of 1.8 metres in residential areas and 2.5 metres in commercial zones), and a furniture zone for utilities and street vendors. Additionally, IRC guidelines mandate a kerb height not exceeding 150 mm and tabletop crosswalks. In practice, these are technical guidelines rather than binding legal requirements, and are unevenly applied; footpaths in many Indian cities remain fragmented, obstructed, or absent.

== Duties of public authorities and policy responses ==
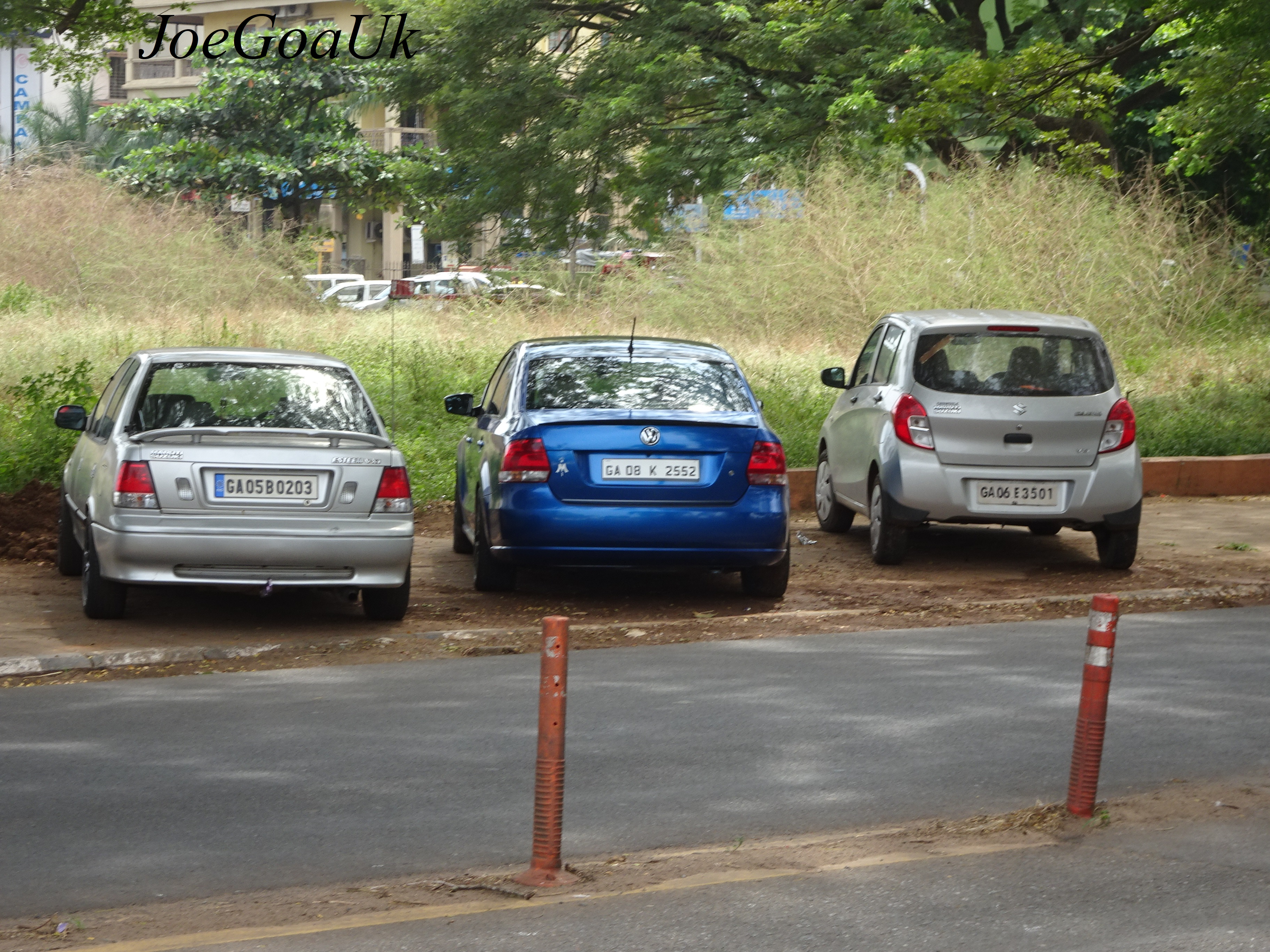
Cars parked on a footpath in Campal, Panjim, Goa

The 2026 judgment paired the fundamental right with a corresponding duty on urban development authorities, municipal corporations, municipalities and panchayats to demarcate and maintain footpaths wherever a road exists.

The Court noted that, unlike several other fundamental rights for which Parliament has enacted detailed statutory regimes, the right to walk lacked a dedicated legislative framework, and it referred the judgment to the relevant Union ministries and the Law Commission for consideration of legislation defining the right, identifying duty-bearers, providing remedies, and establishing a regulator.

The judgment therefore recognised the constitutional right immediately while identifying legislation, engineering standards and administrative enforcement as necessary for its practical effect - a distinction discussed further under Significance below.

== Policy and implementation ==
=== Central level implementation ===
==== Streets for People Challenge ====
The Ministry of Housing and Urban Affairs launched the Streets for People Challenge in 2020 to encourage cities to undertake projects improving walking conditions and public spaces. The challenge required participating cities to test at least one flagship walking project and undertake citizen engagement. The ministry reported that 113 cities registered, while 38 cities submitted proposals in the first phase.

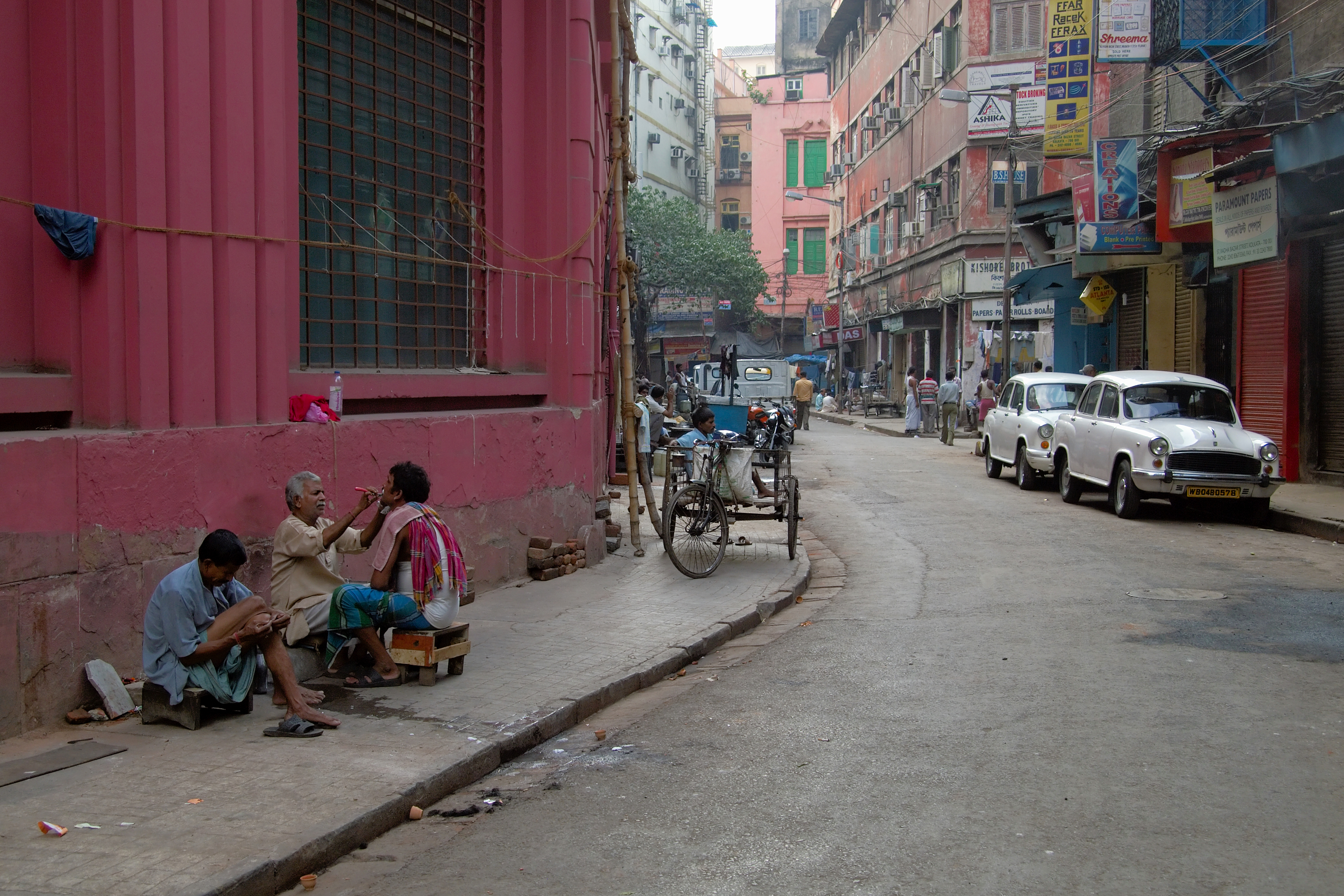
Obstructed footpath in Kolkata

=== State and city-level implementation ===
==== Punjab ====
In May 2023, Punjab became the first Indian state to formally implement a "Right to Walk" mandate, following public-interest litigation before the Punjab and Haryana High Court dating to 2010 and grounded in Article 21. The state directed all road-owning agencies, including the National Highways Authority of India (NHAI) and the state Public Works Department, to make footpaths and cycle tracks mandatory in all future road construction and expansion. Patiala district was the first to formally adopt and begin implementing the policy, from September 2023. Implementation elsewhere in the state has been uneven, constrained by urban space limitations and continuing encroachment.

==== Andhra Pradesh ====
On 7 August 2026, Andhra Pradesh notified the Andhra Pradesh Pedestrian Safety & Universal Accessibility Policy, 2026 - described as the first state policy framed specifically in response to the Supreme Court's ruling. It mandates road-safety audits prioritising high-footfall zones and accident "black spots", engineering standards such as a maximum kerb height of 150 mm and wheelchair-accessible design, and technology-based monitoring including GIS mapping and citizen-reporting portals. The policy applies across urban, peri-urban and rural local-body areas, with initial priority given to million-plus cities.

==== Chennai and other cities: non-motorised transport policies ====
Several Indian cities adopted pedestrian- and cyclist-oriented transport policies well before the 2026 judgment. In October 2014, Chennai became the first Indian city to adopt a dedicated Non-Motorised Transport (NMT) Policy, committing at least 60% of the Chennai Corporation's transport budget to walking and cycling infrastructure and setting targets including footpaths on 80% of city streets and zero pedestrian and cyclist fatalities. The policy is credited with influencing similar approaches in other Indian cities, including Pune and Pimpri-Chinchwad, and smaller Tamil Nadu cities such as Coimbatore, which adopted its own Street Design and Management Policy.

==== Mumbai ====
In Mumbai, the Brihanmumbai Municipal Corporation (BMC) adopted its “Pedestrian First” footpath policy in 2014, subsequently finalising an amended version on 28 December 2016, with the stated objective of facilitating safe pedestrian movement. In May 2023, the BMC issued a “Universal Footpath Policy”, building on the earlier policy and incorporating principles from the Harmonised Guidelines and Standards for Universal Accessibility in India, 2021. The 2023 policy sets out provisions concerning footpath width and surfaces, pedestrian and furniture zones, accessibility and the treatment of obstructions, with the aim of providing safer and more accessible pedestrian infrastructure.

==== Bengaluru ====
Janaagraha has also promoted citizen participation in urban infrastructure through its MyCityMyBudget programme. In Bengaluru, citizen inputs collected through the programme contributed to ward-level budget allocations; in August 2021, ₹120 crore was allocated for ward-level repair of footpaths, potholes and borewells.

== Civil society and walkability activism ==
Alongside formal policy and litigation, citizen-led movements have campaigned for walkable streets. Raahgiri Day, launched in Gurgaon in November 2013 closes stretches of city streets to motor traffic on a recurring basis for use by pedestrians and cyclists; it has since been adopted, at various times, in cities including Delhi, Bhopal, Chandigarh and Hyderabad, and in a 2019 state-level edition in Haryana. In Coimbatore, the ITDP-backed "Namma Kovai Namakke" ("Our Coimbatore, Ourselves") campaign generated citizen demand that fed into that city's own pedestrian and street-design policies, and Coimbatore was the first Tamil Nadu city to hold regular car-free Sundays. Advocates such as Punjab's official traffic adviser Navdeep Asija have also used public-interest litigation as a campaigning tool, including the petition that led to Punjab's 2023 policy.

== Pedestrian safety, fatalities, and urban challenges ==
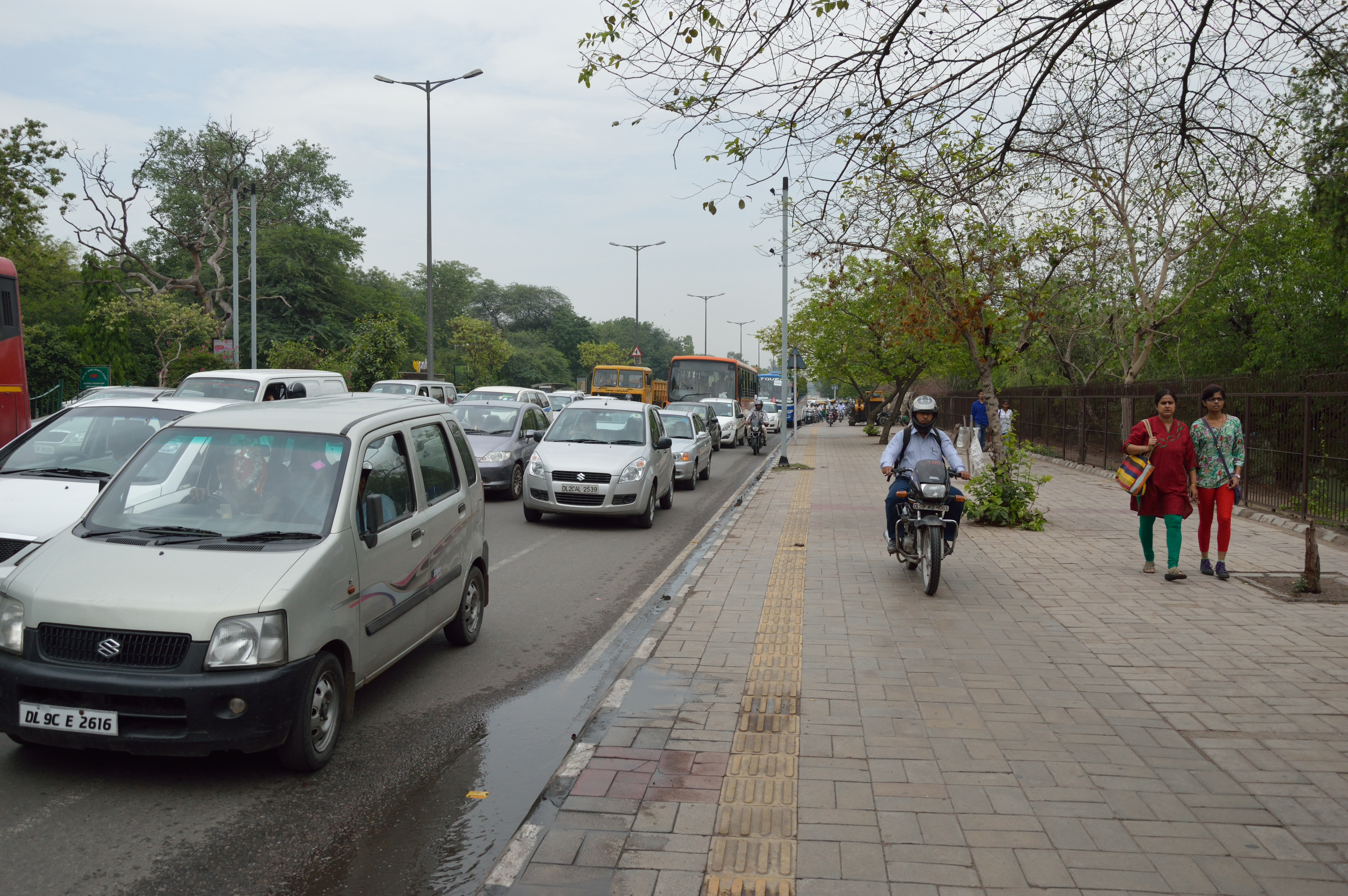
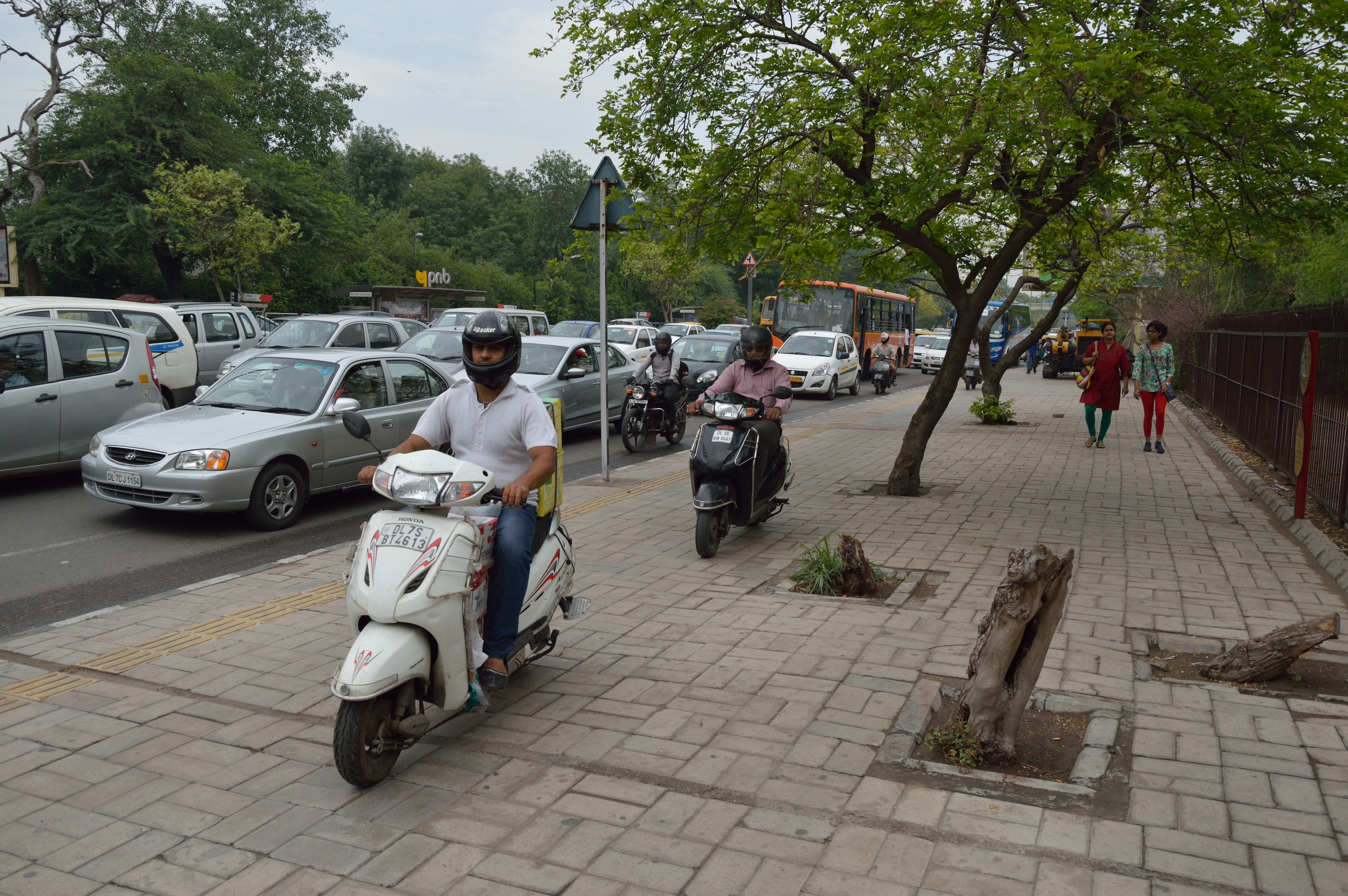
Motorcycles being ridden on a footpath in New Delhi

According to the Ministry of Road Transport and Highways' Road Accidents in India 2024 report, pedestrians accounted for approximately 20.6% of India's 1,77,175 road-accident fatalities that year, making them the second-largest category of road-accident victims after two-wheeler occupants. Reporting on the same data found that recorded pedestrian deaths had risen sharply over the preceding decade. Fatalities are not confined to large cities: highways and rural roads account for a substantial share of pedestrian deaths alongside urban roads.

=== Challenges ===
Key challenges affecting the realisation of pedestrian rights include:

==== Accessibility and universal design ====
Pedestrian rights also concern the ability of people with disabilities, older people and other persons with limited mobility to use public spaces independently and safely. Commonly identified problems include broken or discontinuous footpaths, abrupt level changes, blocked pavements, and crossings and infrastructure that do not accommodate wheelchair users or people with visual impairments.

The 2026 judgment described the right as requiring a "comfortable space" for walking and assigned responsibility for necessary infrastructure to public authorities.

==== Street obstructions and competing uses ====
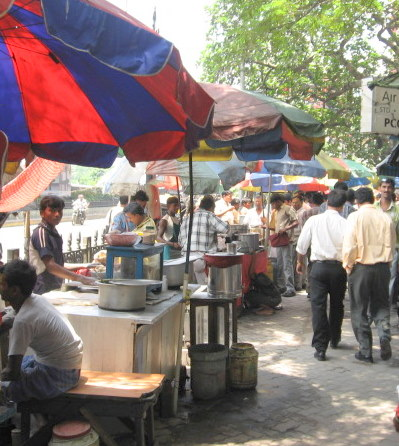
Vendors occupying the footpath in Kolkata

Footpaths in Indian towns and cities are frequently obstructed by parked vehicles, commercial activity, construction, utility infrastructure or vending, which can force pedestrians into carriageways and increase their exposure to motorised traffic.

Because many street vendors and others using footpath space are themselves low-income, resolving these competing claims is not simply a matter of removing every non-pedestrian use; commentators have framed the challenge as maintaining a continuous, accessible pedestrian right-of-way while regulating -rather than eliminating -other uses of public space.

==== Institutional fragmentation ====
Responsibility for footpaths is typically split across municipal corporations, public works departments and traffic police, which complicates coordinated maintenance and enforcement.

== Legal remedies ==
The Supreme Court held that violation of the right to walk on a demarcated footpath may entitle citizens to constitutional and legal remedies against the relevant duty-bearers, including restitution and compensation independent of remedies under the Motor Vehicles Act, 1988. It referred to Sections 38–40 of the Specific Relief Act, 1963 as a basis for enforcing certain public duties against authorities in appropriate cases.

The precise scope and procedure for such remedies remains subject to further judicial development, and to the legislative framework the Court asked the Union government and Law Commission to consider, through the continuing Article 32 proceeding Re: Fundamental Right to Walk and Footpath.

== Significance ==
The 2026 judgment marked a shift in the legal framing of pedestrian safety in India, situating walking within the Constitution's fundamental-rights framework rather than treating it solely as an incidental concern of traffic regulation or municipal engineering.The ruling also distinguished between the right itself, which the Court declared with immediate effect, and the legislative, institutional and engineering measures identified as necessary to give the right practical effect. Subsequent commentary, including on the Andhra Pradesh policy, has questioned whether implementation will match the scope of the judicial declaration.

== In film ==
- The Silent Epidemic

== See also ==
- Motor Vehicles Act, 1988
- Fundamental rights in India
- Indian Roads Congress
- Walkability
- Pedestrian zone
