= Smile International Film Festival for Children and Youth =

Annual film festival in New Delhi, India

Smile International Film Festival for Children & Youth (SIFFCY)
- Location: New Delhi, India
- Website: http://www.siffcy.org

The Smile International Film Festival for Children & Youth (SIFFCY) is an annual film festival in New Delhi organized by the Smile Foundation.

== Organization ==
Smile Foundation is a national development organisation which undertakes welfare projects on education, healthcare, and women's empowerment in over 700 remote villages across 25 states of India. Smile Foundation has produced over 60 short films and documentaries as well as a feature film called I Am Kalam.

== Key members ==
- Santanu Mishra (Smile Foundation co-founder and executive trustee)
- Jitendra Mishra (Festival director)
- Utpal Borpujari (Member)
- Saibal Chatterjee (Member)
- Ashok Rane (Jury Member)
- Jahnu Barua (Adviser)
- Hansal Mehta (Adviser)
- Tigmanshu Dhulia (Adviser)
- Nagesh Kukunoor (Adviser)
- Resul Pookutty (Adviser)
- Santosh Sivan (Adviser)

== Awards ==
- Best Feature Film (Children)
- Best Feature Film (Youth)
- Best Story
- Best Actor
- Best Short Film
- Best Next Gen
- ECFA Best Film
- International Centre of Films for Children & Young People Best Film
- FCCI Best Film
- Best Director
- Best Short Film (Children)
- Best Short Film (Youth)

== General references ==
- "Week-long film festival for kids, youth next month". India.com. 26 November 2015.
- "Maneka Gandhi, Tigmanshu Dhulia inaugurate film fest for kids". Business Standard. 21 December 2015.
- Vaid, Dharvi (26 December 2015). "Pick of movies brings 'smile' on little ones' faces". The Times of India.
