= Bellville, Georgia =

- City
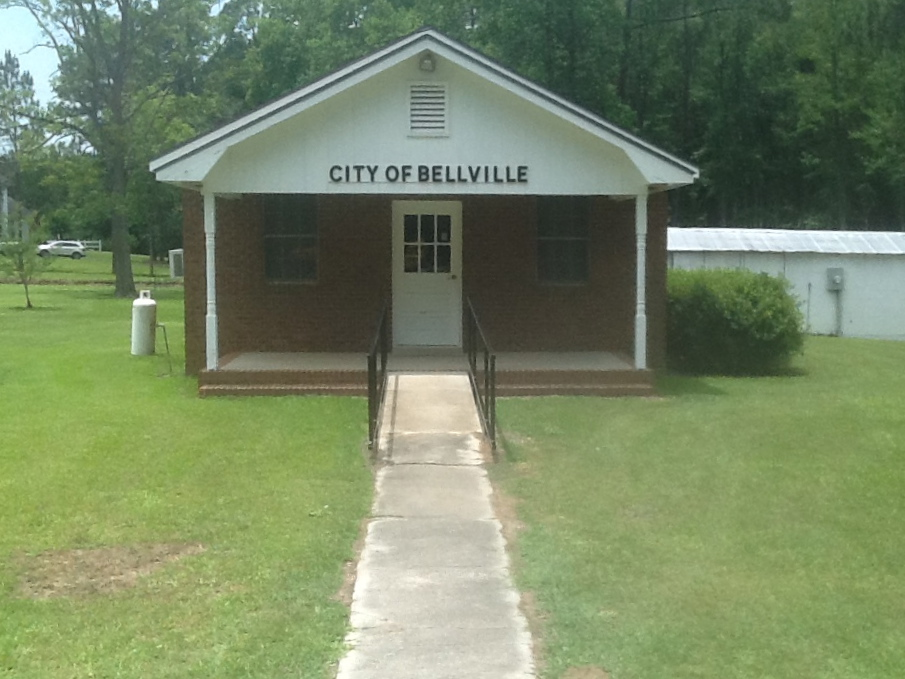
- Motto: Fides Veritas Heriditas
- Location in Evans County and the state of Georgia
- Coordinates: 32°9′10″N 81°58′24″W
- Country: United States
- State: Georgia
- County: Evans

Government
  - Type: Mayor-council government
  - Mayor: Ernest Cox
  - Bellville City Council: Members: Harriet Anderson; Jody McCoy; Derwood Tootle

Area
  - Total: 1.01 sq mi (2.62 km^{2})
  - Land: 0.98 sq mi (2.55 km^{2})
  - Water: 0.027 sq mi (0.07 km^{2})
- Elevation: 184 ft (56 m)

Population (2020)
  - Total: 127
  - Density: 128.8/sq mi (49.73/km^{2})
- Time zone: UTC-5 (Eastern (EST))
  - Summer (DST): UTC-4 (EDT)
- ZIP code: 30414
- Area code: 912
- FIPS code: 13-06688
- GNIS feature ID: 0354538
- Website: www.thecityofbellville.com

Bellville is a city in Evans County, Georgia, United States. As of the 2020 census, the city had a population of 127. It is the hometown of film director James Kicklighter.

== History ==
Bellville was laid out in 1890 when the railroad was extended to that point. Bellville incorporated in 1959. Hines Daniel served as the first Mayor.

== Geography ==
Bellville is located in western Evans County at 32°9′10″N 81°58′24″W (32.152828, -81.973366), along U.S. Route 280, which leads east 4 miles (6 km) to Claxton, the county seat, and southwest 10 miles (16 km) to Reidsville. Georgia State Route 292 branches off US 280 and passes through the center of Bellville, leading west 8 miles (13 km) to Collins. Georgia State Route 169 crosses GA 292 in the center of Bellville, running north–south.

According to the United States Census Bureau, the city has a total area of 1.01 square miles (2.62 km^{2}), of which 0.98 square miles (2.55 km^{2}) is land and 0.03 square miles (0.07 km^{2}), or 2.53%, is water.

=== Climate ===
Bellville has a humid subtropical climate according to the Köppen classification. The city has hot and humid summers with average highs of 94 degrees and lows of 70 degrees in July. Winters are mild with average January highs of 61 degrees and lows of 36 degrees. Winter storms are rare, but they can happen on occasion.

Climate data for Bellville, Georgia
Month	Jan	Feb	Mar	Apr	May	Jun	Jul	Aug	Sep	Oct	Nov	Dec	Year
Record high °F (°C)	81 (27)	86 (30)	89 (32)	96 (36)	98 (37)	106 (41)	107 (42)	105 (41)	104 (40)	96 (36)	87 (31)	84 (29)	107 (42)
Mean daily maximum °F (°C)	61 (16)	66 (19)	73 (23)	78 (26)	86 (30)	91 (33)	94 (34)	92 (33)	87 (31)	80 (27)	71 (22)	63 (17)	79 (26)
Mean daily minimum °F (°C)	36 (2)	39 (4)	44 (7)	50 (10)	59 (15)	67 (19)	71 (22)	70 (21)	65 (18)	54 (12)	45 (7)	38 (3)	53 (12)
Record low °F (°C)	−2 (−19)	13 (−11)	16 (−9)	28 (−2)	41 (5)	48 (9)	58 (14)	56 (13)	45 (7)	30 (−1)	22 (−6)	13 (−11)	−2 (−19)
Average precipitation inches (mm)	4.36 (111)	3.57 (91)	3.25 (83)	2.95 (75)	3.21 (82)	5.12 (130)	4.68 (119)	5.41 (137)	3.73 (95)	3.87 (98)	2.49 (63)	3.17 (81)	45.81 (1,165)
Source: The Weather Channel

== Demographics ==
Historical population
Census	Pop.	Note	%±
1970	234		—
1980	173		−26.1%
1990	192		11.0%
2000	130		−32.3%
2010	123		−5.4%
2020	127		3.3%
U.S. Decennial Census

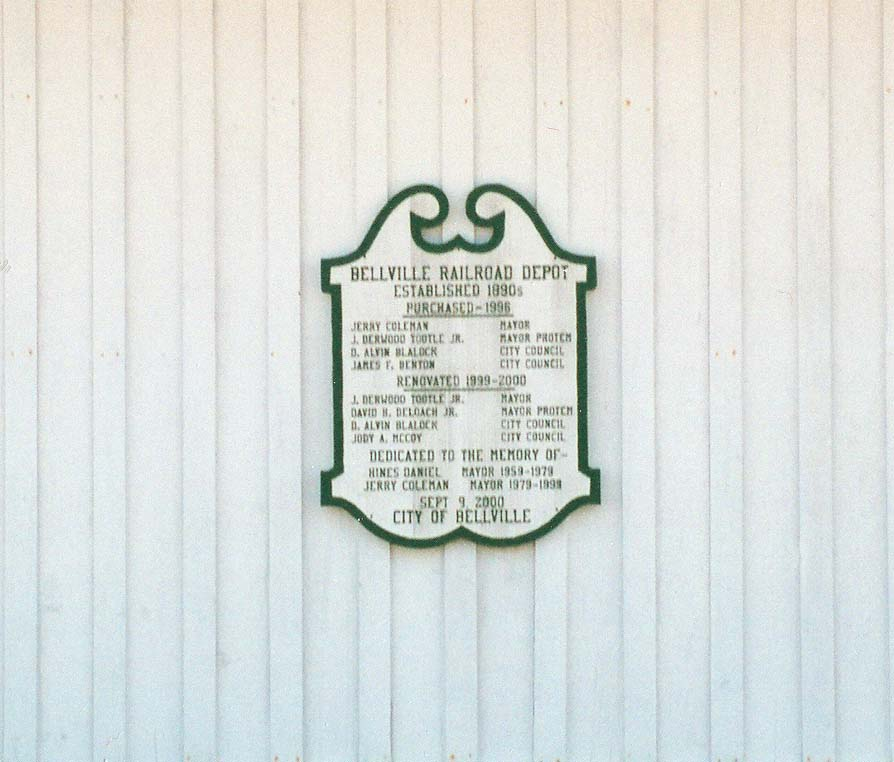
The 1890s railroad depot in Bellville. The town celebrates "Railroad Days" once a year.

As of the census of 2010, there were 123 people, 54 households, and 42 families residing in the city. By the 2020 census, its population increased to 127.
