= The Silent Epidemic =

The Silent Epidemic is a 2023 Indian documentary short film directed by Akshat Gupta and produced by social entrepreneur Sarika Panda Bhatt and filmmaker Jitendra Mishra. Presented by the Raahgiri Foundation and Cinema4Good in association with the Wheeling Happiness Foundation, the 22-minute film explores the socio-economic impact and human cost of road traffic crashes in India through personal accounts of survivors and grieving families. The documentary received national recognition at the 71st National Film Awards, winning the award for Best Non-Feature Film Promoting Social and Environmental Values.

== Synopsis ==
The film explores the impact of road accidents in India through the stories of survivors, families, and road safety experts. Focusing on Gurugram, the documentary shows how unsafe roads affect people's lives and highlights the importance of improving road safety and making streets safer for everyone.

== Production ==
The film was directed by Akshat Gupta and Akash Basu. It was produced under the banners of Cinema4Good and the Raahgiri Foundation, an organization advocating for pedestrian rights and sustainable mobility, with backing from the Wheeling Happiness Foundation, co-founded by Paralympians Deepa Malik and Devika Malik. Principal photography took place across urban locations in North India, focusing on traffic corridors in Gurugram and Delhi.

== See also ==
- Road safety
- Road traffic collision
- 71st National Film Awards
