= Ankit Bhardwaj =

Indian film and television actor

Ankiit Bhardwaaj
- Born: 9 June 1995 (age 31); Jaipur, Rajasthan, India
- Occupation: Actor
- Years active: 2012–present

Ankiit Bhardwaaj is an Indian film Actor and writer, Director. He made his debut with the Hollywood movie Desires of the Heart (2013 film) as Gopal from India. Ankiit bhardwaaj got best actor male award for his film LOVE YOU MHAARI JAAN in rajasthan film festival 2023.

He had started his career in Indian television industry with Zee TV series Sapne Suhane Ladakpan Ke in which he played the role of Vachan Singh. Later he also played as Viren in the love drama series O Gujariya: Badlein Chal Duniya featured on Channel V. He has also performed the role of Sanjay in Colors channel popular show Thapki Pyaar Ki and role of Chandrasen - Prince of Marwar in Sony Entertainment Television's show Bharat Ka Veer Putra – Maharana Pratap.

He has also played the lead role in movie based on Patel Andolan for Reservation Humein Haq Chahiye...Haq Se.

Ankiit was also cast as the lead actor in the music video Mezbaan Zindagi released by Zee Music Company in 2018

In 2018 he was featured in Indian Hindi horror anthology television series Kaun Hai?

During start of 2019, he had featured in Zee TV show Rajaa Betaa.

In 2022, Bhardwaj was featured in StarPlus show Rajjo (TV series) as Mukund.

== Career ==
He appeared in the English independent film Desires of the Heart as Gopal. He continued in theatre during this period and was a member of Nadira Babbar's Ekjute theatre group. Simultaneously he auditioned for Vijay singh movie. Gram post Bharat in which he got a grey shade character as Krishna. Then he moved towards Indian television industry he did Sapne Suhane Ladakpan Ke as Vachan singh, O Gujariya: Badlein Chal Duniya on Channel V as Viren. He had also worked in Colors show Thapki Pyaar Ki as Sanjay and as Rao Chandrasen Rathore - Prince of Marwar in Sony Entertainment Television's show Bharat Ka Veer Putra – Maharana Pratap.

He recently completed his another movie Humein Haq Chahiye...Haq Se. In this film he has played the character of a young guy who is the leader to the Reservation movement for Patidars in Gujarat with actor Gaurav Prateek which released in November 2017.

His latest movie released was Baazi Zindagi Ki by Linkway Films International in which he has played the lead role.

He has acted in the music video Mezbaan Zindagi released by Zee Music Company in 2018.

In August 2018, he has played role in Colors Horror TV series Kaun Hai?.

During start of 2019, he had featured in Zee TV show Rajaa Betaa.

== Filmography ==
=== Television ===
Year	Title	Role	Channel
2013	Sapne Suhane Ladakpan Ke	Vachan Singh	Zee TV
2014	O Gujariya: Badlein Chal Duniya	Viren	Channel V India
2015	CID	Lead (negative)	Sony Entertainment Television
2015	Thapki Pyar Ki	Sanjay Pandey	Colors TV
2015	Bharat Ka Veer Putra – Maharana Pratap	Rao Chandrasen Rathore- The Prince of Marwar	Sony Entertainment Television
2015	Devlok with Devdutt Pattanaik	Arjun	The EPIC Channel
2015	Code Red (Indian TV series)	news anchor	Colors TV
2016	Savdhaan India	lead (negative)	Life OK
2017	Kaun Hai?	Arjun	Colors TV
2018	Fear Files: Darr Ki Sacchi Tasvirein	Aarav	Zee TV
2018–19	Rajaa Betaa	Rahul	Zee TV
2019	Savdhaan India	Puttu	Star Bharat
2022	Rajjo	Mukund Singh Thakur	StarPlus

=== Films ===
Year	Title	Role
2013	Desires of the Heart (2013 film hollywood)	Gopal
2016	Humein Haq Chahiye... Haq se Zee Studios	Harshad Patel
2017	Baazi Zindagi Ki	Major Ravi
2017	Humzubaa'n Ho Tum Zee Music Company	Lead Role
2018	Mezbaan Zindigi Zee Music Company	Lead Role
2018	The Successful Losers Mx player	Rohan
2019	SAHEB JI (Rajasthani song); Rapperiya Baalam	Lead role
2022	Love you mahri Jaan (Rajasthani movie)	Uday (lead)
2024	Silence 2: The Night Owl Bar Shootout	Sunny
2024	Kartavya (movie)	Shubham

=== Web series ===
Year	Title	Role	Platform
2022	City Land	Mr. Hacker	
2022	Margaon closed files	Smile	Waves ott
2022	Trip and Trap	Saurabh	Hungama
2022	Moksha	Siddharth	Disney+ Hotstar
2022	Shehar Lakhot	Tp singh	Amazon prime
2022	Love Next Door	Dev	Atrangi TV
2023	Beend banungo ghodi chadungo(Rajasthani webseries)	Gopal	Stage app
2026	Bhomiyaa	Bhomiya	Stage app
