= Walkability =

How accessible a space is to walking

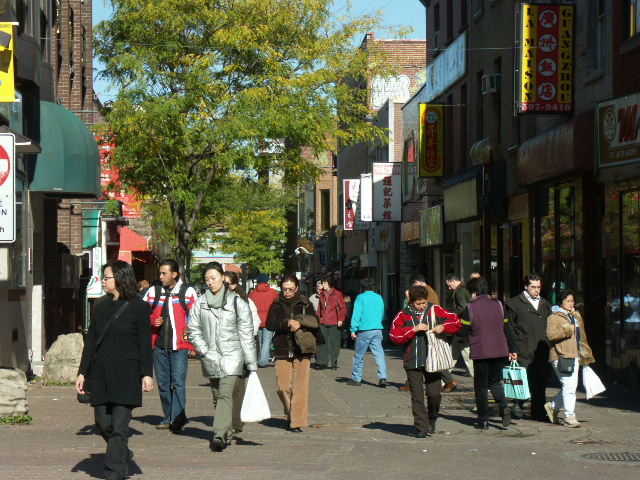
De la Gauchetière Street, Montreal

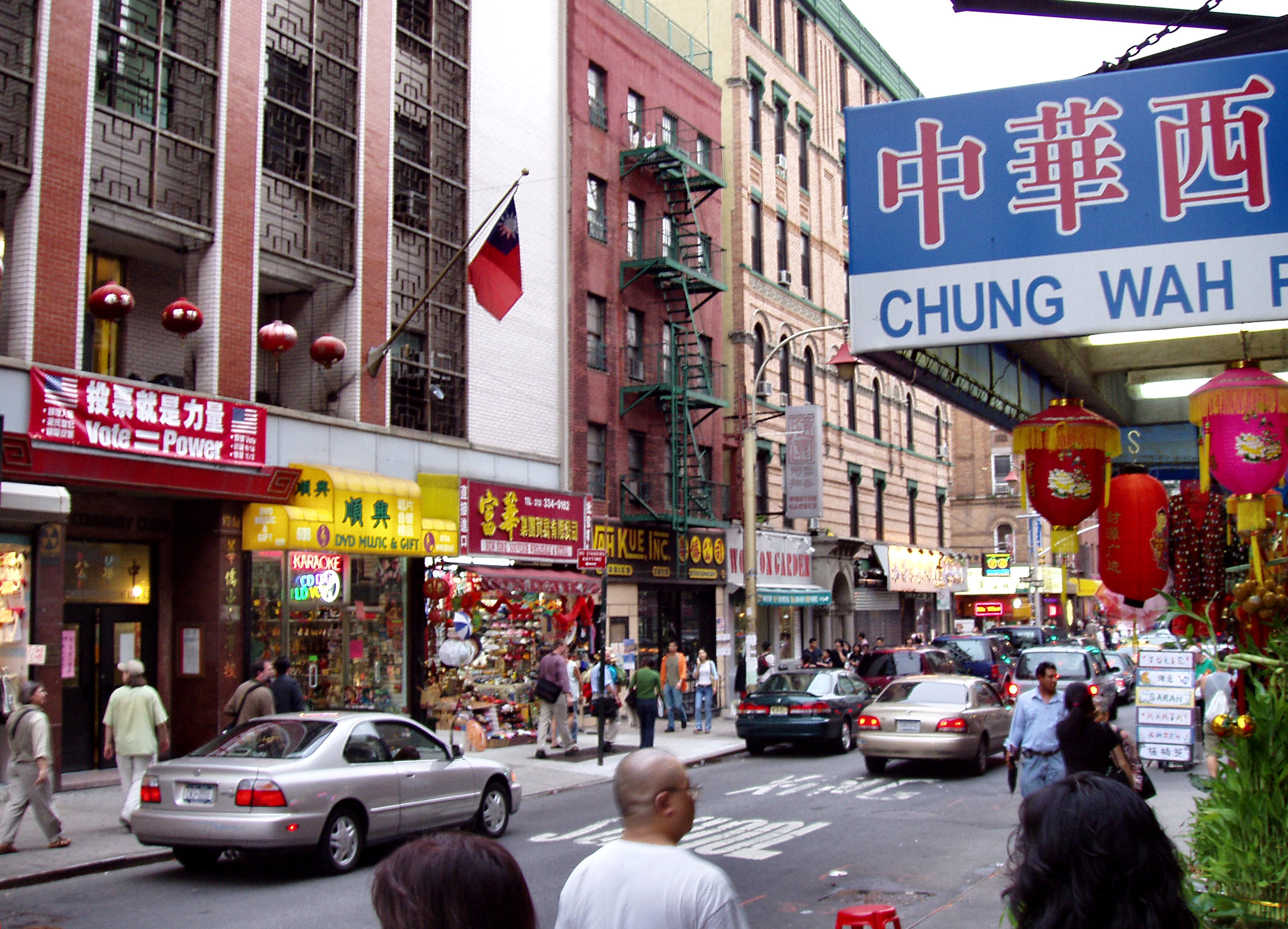
Chinatown, New York City

In urban planning, walkability is the accessibility of amenities within a reasonable walking distance. This concept is based on the idea that urban spaces should serve purposes beyond mere transport corridors designed for maximum vehicle throughput. Instead, the objective should be to create relatively complete, livable spaces that serve a variety of uses, users, and transportation modes, thereby reducing the need for cars for travel. The first of the ten principles of New Urbanism is walkability.

== Etymology ==
In a 1961 book, The Death and Life of Great American Cities, Jane Jacobs proposed radically new principles for rebuilding cities by increasing urban diversity, density, and dynamism, or in effect: to crowd people and activities together in a jumping, joyous urban jumble. While her seminal book never used the term walkability, a New Urbanism was launched.

To bring Jacob's vision into the urban planning mainstream, empirical research was needed. In 1994, Lawrence D. Frank and Gary Pivo provided some of the earliest and frequently cited quantifications of the link between urban design and walking. In 2001, Frank and Engelke published a frequently cited review of evidence for the claim that urban design can increase walking and biking and improve public health.

In 2003, the term walkability was repeatedly used in a frequently cited academic article: Environmental Correlates of Walking and Cycling. Based on a comprehensive literature review the authors concluded that high density urban design, walking, and public health were empirically interrelated. They also called for the creation of a walkability index.

In 2004, another highly cited article, Obesity Relationships with Community Design, Physical Activity, and Time Spent in Cars, quantitatively linked walkability to obesity. A 2026 commentary by Margaret B. Nolan refers to the article as remarkably prescient.

The term walkability became popular because of its health, economic, and environmental benefits. It is an essential concept of sustainable urban design. Factors influencing walkability include the presence or absence and quality of footpaths, sidewalks or other pedestrian rights-of-way, traffic and road conditions, land use patterns, building accessibility, and safety, among others.

== Factors ==
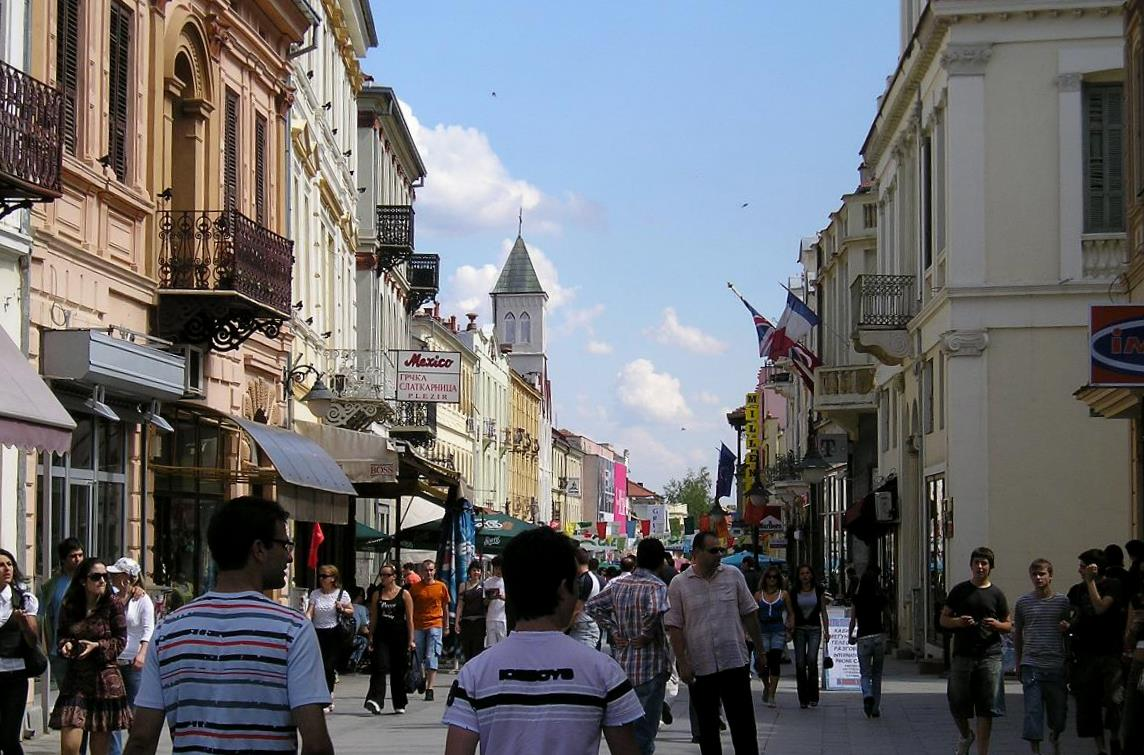
Mixed use pedestrian friendly street in Bitola, North Macedonia

One proposed definition for walkability is: "The extent to which the built environment is friendly to the presence of people living, shopping, visiting, enjoying or spending time in an area". A study attempted to comprehensively and objectively measure subjective qualities of the urban street environment. Using ratings from an expert panel, it was possible to measure five urban design qualities in terms of physical characteristics of streets and their edges: imageability, enclosure, human scale, transparency and complexity. Walkability relies on the interdependencies between density, mix, and access in synergy. The urban DMA (Density, Mix, Access) is a set of synergies between the ways cities concentrate people and buildings, how they mix different people and activities, and the access networks used to navigate through them.

These factors cannot be taken singularly. Rather than an ideal functional mix, there is a mix of mixes and interdependencies between formal, social, and functional mixes. Likewise, walkable access cannot be reduced to any singular measure of connectivity, permeability, or catchment but is dependent on destinations and geared to metropolitan access through public transit nodes. While DMA is based on walkability measures, popular "walk score" or "rate my street" websites offer more metrics to connect urban morphology with better environmental and health outcomes.

=== Density ===
Density is an interrelated assemblage of buildings, populations, and street life. It is a crucial property of walkability because it concentrates more people and places within walkable distances. There is difficulty determining density due to populations oscillating from the suburbs to the urban center. Moreover, measures of density can differ dramatically for different morphologies and building typologies. Density may be conflated with building height, contributing to the confusion.

The ratio between the floor area and the site area is generally known as the Floor Area Ratio (FAR, also called Plot Ratio and Floor Space Index). For example, a ten-story building on 10% of the site has the same floor area as a single-story building with 100% site coverage. Secondly, the measure of dwellings/hectare is common but particularly blunt. It depends on the functional mix, household size, and dwelling size in relation to building or population densities. Larger houses will produce higher building densities for the same population, and larger households will lead to higher populations for the same number of dwellings. In functionally mixed neighborhoods, housing will be just one component of the mix and therefore not a measure of building or population density. The census-based density of residents/hectare is another common measure, but it does not include those who work there.

=== Functional mix ===
When each neighbourhood has a mixture of homes, schools, work and other places people want to visit, the distances between these places are shortened. This makes it more attractive for people to walk. The idea of a functional mix contrasts with the early 20th century modernist vision, which was that each zone in a city should have a single function. This mix is sometimes visualised with the "home, work, visit" triangle. The extremes of the triangle represent zones where one can only work, or visit, or live. A walkable city has few of these zones. Instead, there are places where when can combine at least two of the three functions. When a town or city has smaller plot sizes, it is easier to create a multi-functional neighbourhood.

=== Access networks ===
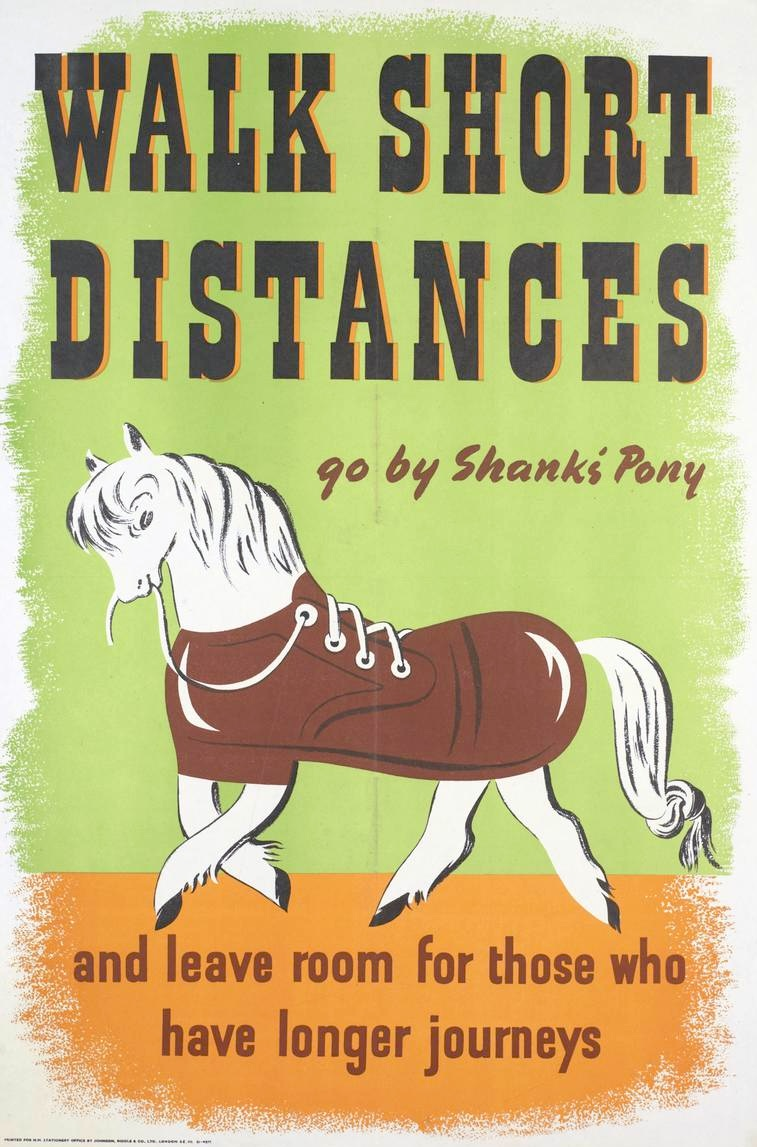
British poster encouraging energy conservation during World War II

The access networks of a city enable and constrain pedestrian flows. It is the capacity or possibility to walk. Like density and mix, these are properties embodied in urban form and facilitate more efficient pedestrian flows. Access networks are also multi-modal and need to be understood from the perspective of those who choose between modes of walking, cycling, public transport, and cars. Public transport trips are generally coupled with walkable access to the transit stop. Walking will primarily be chosen for up to 10 minutes if it is the fastest mode and other factors are equal. Walking has the advantage that it is a much more predictable trip time than public transport or cars, where we have to allow for delays caused by poor service, congestion, and parking.

Major infrastructural factors include access to mass transit, presence and quality of footpaths, buffers to moving traffic (planter strips, on-street parking or bike lanes) and pedestrian crossings, aesthetics, nearby local destinations, air quality, shade or sun in appropriate seasons, street furniture, traffic volume and speed, and wind conditions. Walkability is also examined based on the surrounding built environment. Reid Ewing and Robert Cervero's five D's of the built environment—density, diversity, design, destination accessibility, and distance to transit—heavily influence an area's walkability. Combinations of these factors influence an individual's decision to walk.

== History ==
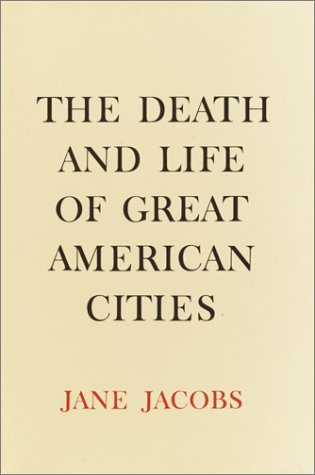
This classic book by Jane Jacobs promoted walkability

Before cars and bicycles were mass-produced, walking was the main way to travel. In the 1920s, economic growth led to increased automobile manufacturing. Cars were also becoming more affordable, leading to the rise of the automobile during the Post–World War II economic expansion.

Jane Jacobs' classic book The Death and Life of Great American Cities remains one of the most influential books in the history of American city planning, especially concerning the future developments of the walkability concept. She coined the terms "social capital", "mixed primary uses", and "eyes on the street", which were adopted professionally in urban design, sociology, and many other fields.

While there has been a push towards better walkability in cities in recent years, there are still many obstacles that need to be cleared to achieve more complete and cohesive communities where residents won't have to travel as far to get to where they need to go. For example, the average time it has taken American commuters to get to work has actually increased from 25 minutes in 2006 to 27.6 minutes in 2019, so much is still to be done if walkability is to be realized and a lessened reliance on cars comes into fruition.

== Benefits ==
=== Health ===
Walkability indices have been found to correlate with both lower Body Mass Index (BMI) and high levels of physical activity of local populations. Physical activity can prevent chronic diseases, such as cardiovascular disease, diabetes, hypertension, obesity, depression, and osteoporosis. Thus for instance, an increase in neighborhood Walk Score has linked with both better Cardio metabolic risk profiles and a decreased risk of heart-attacks. The World Cancer Research Fund and American Institute for Cancer Research released a report that new developments should be designed to encourage walking, on the grounds that walking contributes to a reduction of cancer. A further justification for walkability is founded upon evolutionary and philosophical grounds, contending that gait is important to the cerebral development in humans.

In addition, walkable neighborhoods have been linked to higher levels of happiness, health, trust, and social connections in comparison with more car-oriented places.

In contrast to walkable environments, less walkable environments are associated with higher BMIs and higher rates of obesity. This is particularly true for the more car-dependent environments of US suburban sprawl. Compared to walking and biking, driving as a commuting option is associated with higher levels of obesity. There are well-established links between the design of an urban area (including its walkability and land use policy) and health outcomes for that community.

A 2025 study, using the smartphone data of more than two million users, found that individuals who move to more walkable cities substantially increase their physical activity, "For example, moving from a less walkable (25th percentile) city to a more walkable city (75th percentile) increased walking by 1,100 daily steps, on average. These changes hold across different genders, ages and body mass index values, and are sustained over 3 months. The added activity is predominantly composed of moderate-to-vigorous physical activity, which is linked to an array of associated health benefits."

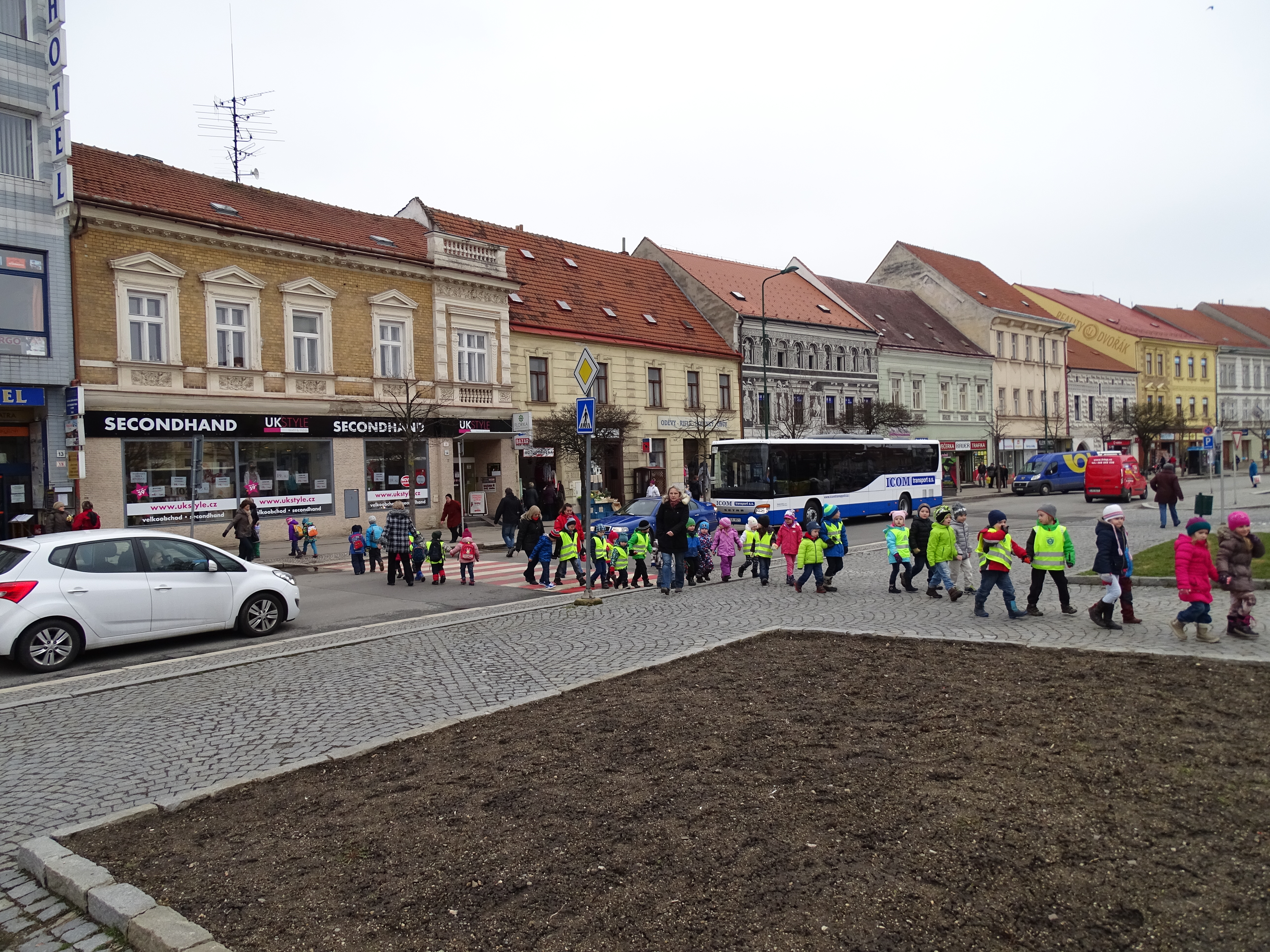
Walking bus in Třebíč, Czech Republic

=== Socioeconomic ===
Walkability has also been found to have many socioeconomic benefits, including accessibility, cost savings both to individuals and to the public, student transport (which can include walking buses), increased efficiency of land use, increased livability, economic benefits from improved public health, and economic development, among others. The benefits of walkability are best guaranteed if the entire system of public corridors is walkable - not limited to certain specialized routes. More sidewalks and increased walkability can promote tourism and increase property value.

In recent years, the demand for housing in a walkable urban context has increased. The term "Missing Middle Housing" as coined by Daniel Parolek of Opticos Design, Inc., refers to multi-unit housing types (such as duplexes, fourplexes, bungalow courts, and mansion apartments not bigger than a large house), which are integrated throughout most walkable Pre-1940s neighborhoods, but became much less common after World War II, hence the term "missing". These housing types are often integrated into blocks with primarily single-family homes, to provide diverse housing choices and generate enough density to support transit and locally-serving commercial amenities.

Auto-focused street design diminishes walking and needed "eyes on the street" provided by the steady presence of people in an area. Walkability increases social interaction, mixing of populations, the average number of friends and associates where people live, reduced crime (with more people walking and watching over neighborhoods, open space and main streets), increased sense of pride, and increased volunteerism.

Socioeconomic factors contribute to willingness to choose walking over driving. Income, age, race, ethnicity, education, household status, and having children in a household all influence walking travel.

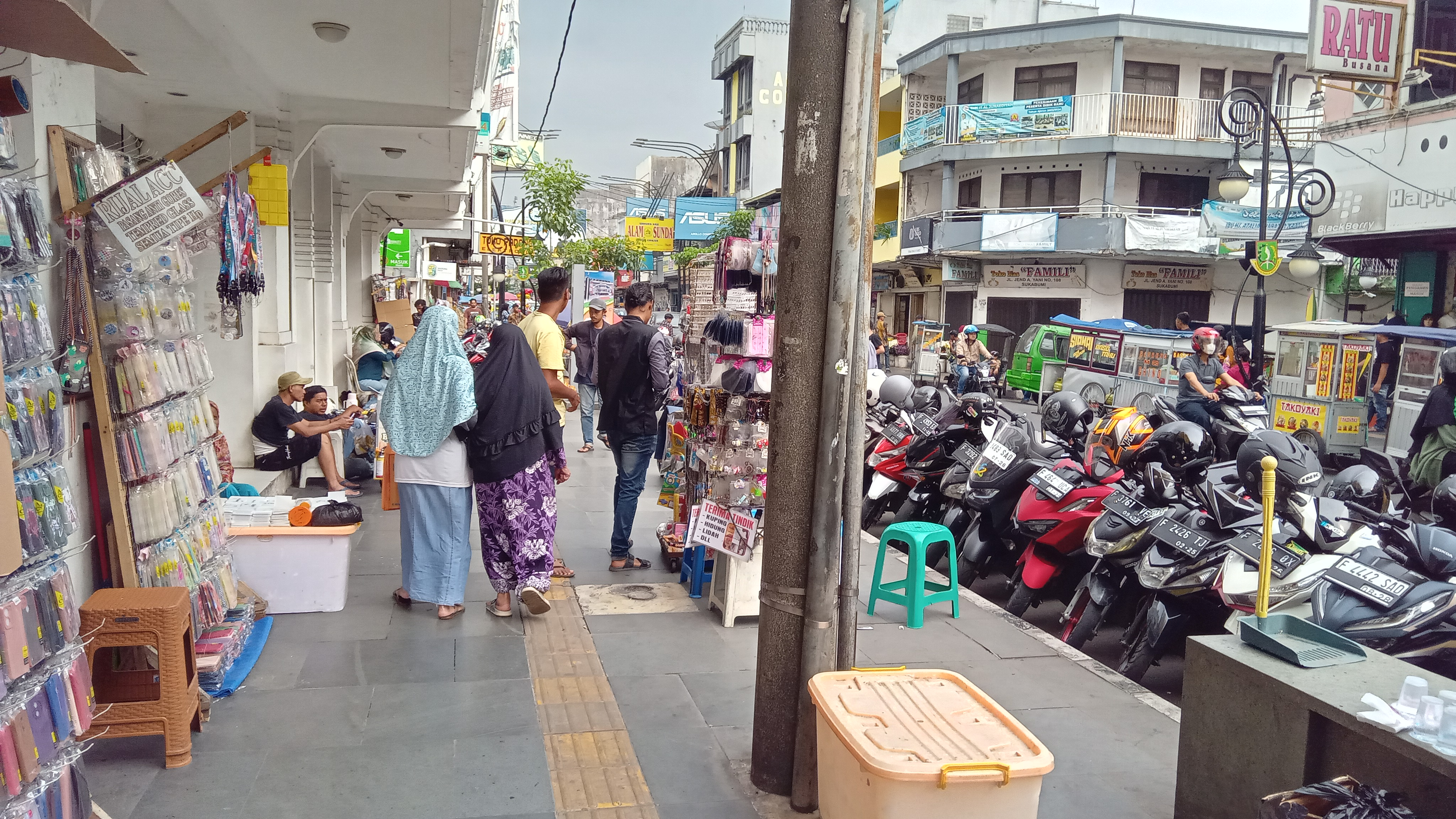
Lively street in Sukabumi, Indonesia

=== Environmental ===
One of benefits of improving walkability is the decrease of the automobile footprint in the community. Carbon emissions can be reduced if more people choose to walk rather than drive or use public transportation, so proponents of walkable cities describe improving walkability as an important tool for adapting cities to climate change. The benefits of less emissions include improved health conditions and quality of life, less smog, and less of a contribution to global climate change.

Further, cities that developed under guiding philosophies like walkability typically see lower levels of noise pollution in their neighborhoods. This goes beyond just making quieter communities to live, less noise pollution can also mean greater biodiversity. Studies have shown that noise pollution can disrupt certain senses that animals rely on to find food, reproduce, avoid predators, etc. which can weaken ecosystems in an already human dominated environment. Society depends on these ecosystem for many ecological services such as provisioning, regulation, cultural/tourism, and supporting services and any degradation of these services can go beyond just affecting the aesthetic of a neighborhood or community but can have serious implications for livability and wellbeing on entire regions.

Cities that have a relatively high walkability score also tend to have a higher concentration of green spaces which facilitate a more walkable city. These green spaces can assist in regulatory ecological services such as flooding, improving the quality of both air and water, carbon sequestration, etc. all while also improving the attractiveness of the city or town in which it's implemented in.

== Notable walkable cities ==
There are several cities around the world that are commonly identified as highly walkable based on certain traits they possess such as the density of the streets, walkable pedestrian infrastructure, access to public transit networks, as well as the distance from houses to important locations such as schools and grocery stores. There are studies across the OECD (Organisation for Economic Co-operation and Development) countries that have determined these features in cities are very correlated with highly walkable areas.

One example in Northern Europe of a notably walkable city is Denmark's capital Copenhagen, cited as being highly planned for foot traffic after their pedestrianization of Strøget in the year 1962. This was one of the first major conversions of an urban street into a pedestrian haven, and this intervention aided and inspired future European metropolises to prioritize public spaces as well.

In Eastern Asia, Japan's Tokyo has highly dense neighborhoods and streets that are greatly interconnected throughout the city. Additionally, residents are typically close in distance to key businesses and services, easing use of cars and transit. Several suburbs of Tokyo also have flat grounds to walk on, making accessibility for especially older generations easier.

Barcelona, Spain has gotten global attention for their urban planning model referred to as a "superblock", which essentially creates less car movement in its residential areas by diverting traffic circulation to outside of key residential and pedestrian spaces. The idea behind the superblock approach is that it encourages communities to walk more by pushing cars further out of the everyday bustling areas, which also helps lower detrimental environmental factors like pollution, noise, and traffic related injuries from city centers.

The global hub London, England is identified as highly walkable due to street density and advanced public transport accessibility, which together support walking in close suburbs and easy daily commuting to further zones of the city. A walkability index that was created for Greater London shows that London possessed the key features of proximity to services, advanced street connectivity, and residential density.

In the United States, New York City is commonly regarded as the most walkable major city due to the advanced subway network, dense street grid, and zoning patterns. NYC is the least car-dependent city in the USA, with figures showing around 55% of the city's residents do not own a car, showcasing the dependency New Yorkers have on sufficient public transit.

== Accessibility challenges ==
Researchers have noted the difficulties that arise for people with mobility-related disabilities in aspects of walkable cities. Often, features of walkability prioritize space density and public transport, but may overlook certain infrastructure common in these cities that makes navigation difficult for some mobility-impaired persons. A study conducted in 2025 proposed creating a Universal Accessibility Index to take into account aspects like sidewalk continuity, ramp features, pavement conditions, road obstructions, stairs and elevators, and handrails. The study found that women, senior citizens, and disabled persons were less likely to participate in walking and public transport if perceived as having a low level of accessibility.

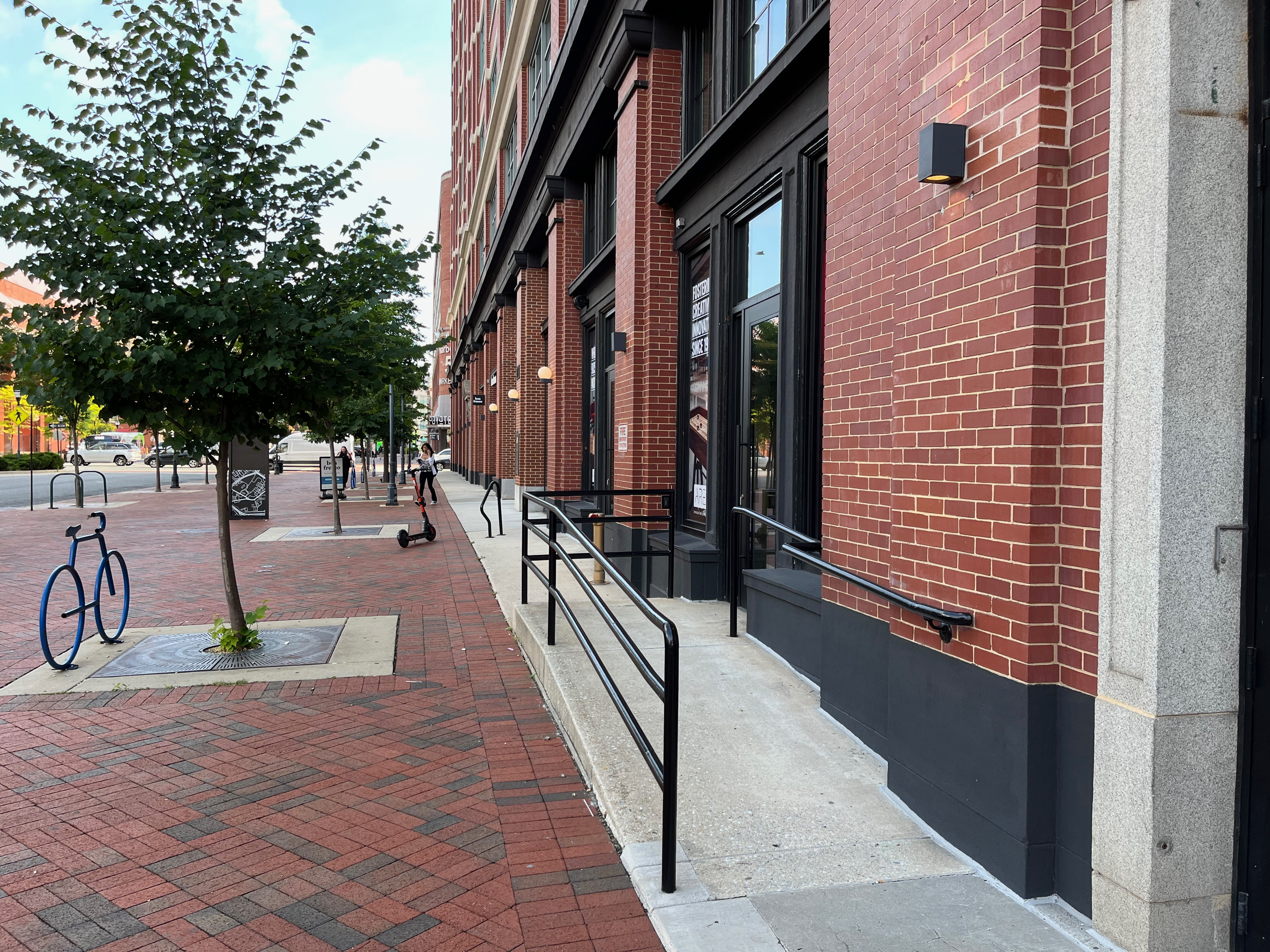
An accessible ramp on a sidewalk in Baltimore.

== Increasing walkability ==
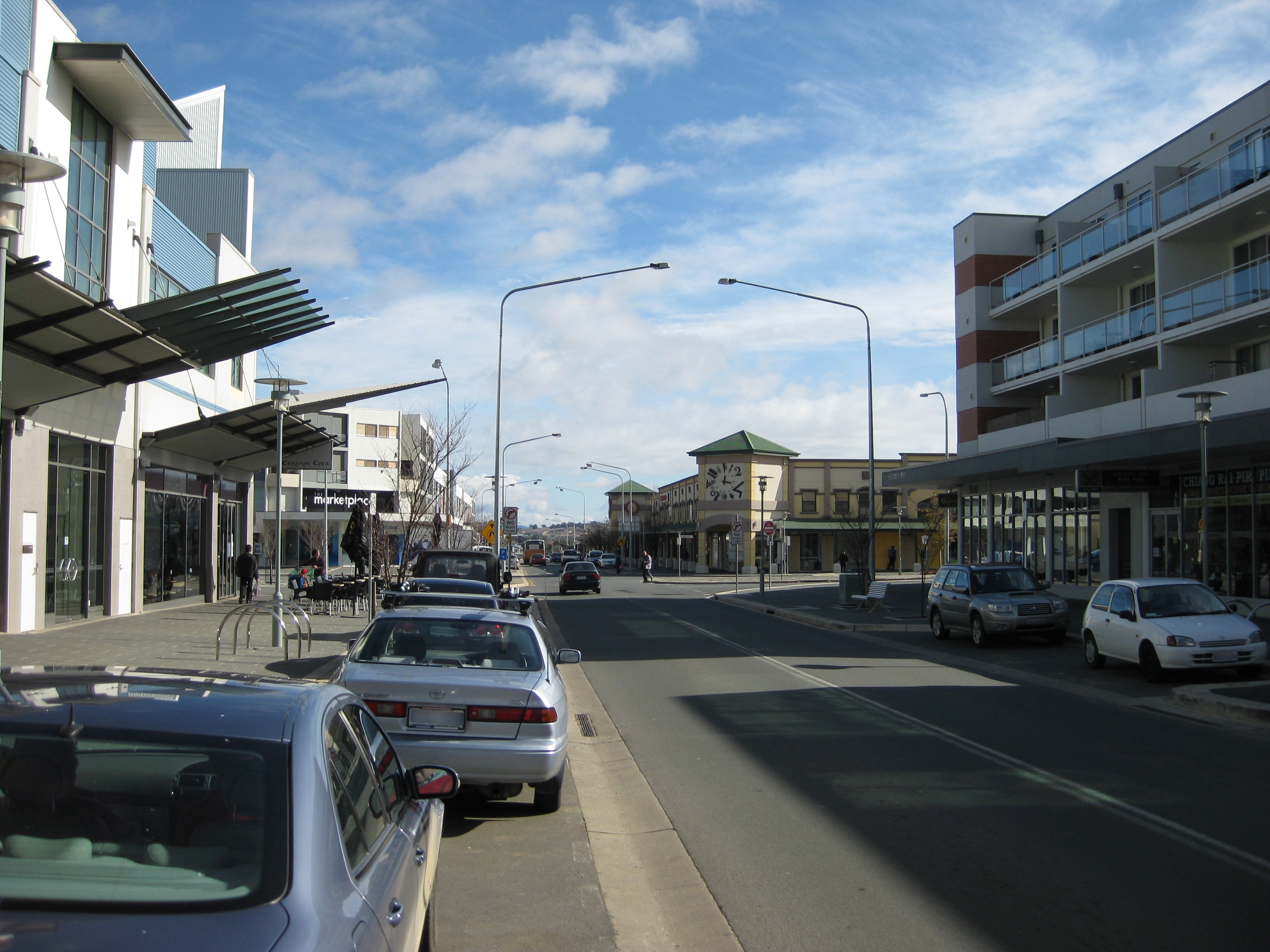
Hibberson St. in Gungahlin, Australian Capital Territory, in 2009

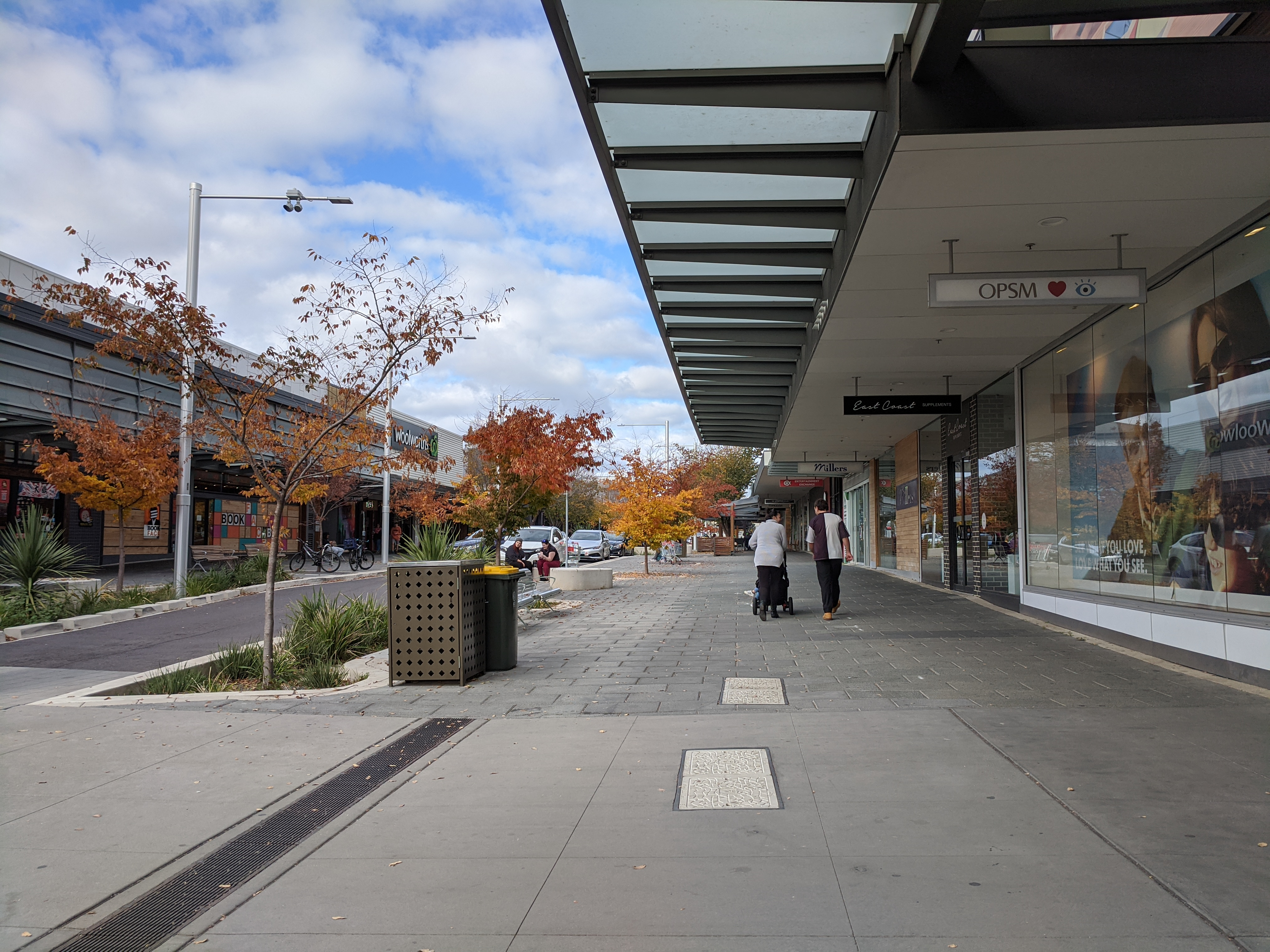
Hibberson St. in 2020, after a pedestrian-friendly plan carried out by the ACT Government

Many communities have embraced pedestrian mobility as an alternative to older building practices that favor automobiles. This shift includes a belief that dependency on cars is ecologically unsustainable. Automobile-oriented environments engender dangerous conditions for motorists and pedestrians and are generally bereft of aesthetics. A type of zoning called Form-based coding is a tool that some American cities, like Cincinnati, are employing to improve walkability. The COVID-19 pandemic gave birth to proposals for radical change in the organization of the city, in particular in Barcelona with the publication of the Manifesto for the Reorganisation of the city -written by architecture theorist Massimo Paolini- in which the elimination of the car and the consequent pedestrianization of the whole city is one of the critical elements, as well as the proposed inversion of the concept of the sidewalk.

There are several ways to make a community more walkable:

- Buffers: Vegetation buffers as grass areas between the street and the sidewalk also make sidewalks safer and also absorbs the carbon dioxide from automobile emissions and assists with water drainage.
- Moving obstructions: removing signposts and utility poles, can increase the walkable width of the sidewalk. Quality maintenance and proper sidewalks lighting reduce obstructions, improve safety, and encourage walking.
- Sidewalk gaps: Sidewalks can be implemented where there are "sidewalk gaps", with priority to areas where walking is encouraged, such as around schools or transit stations. Campaigns such as Atlanta, Georgia's safe transit routes provide safer access to transit stops for pedestrians. There are several aspects to consider when implementing new sidewalks, such as sidewalk width. The Americans with Disabilities Act (ADA) requires that sidewalks be at least five feet in width.
- Pedestrian zone: New infrastructure and pedestrian zones replace roads for better walkability. Cities undertake pedestrian projects for better traffic flow by closing automobile access and only allowing pedestrians to travel. Projects such as New York's High Line and Chicago's 606 Trail increase walkability by connecting neighborhoods, using landscape architectural elements to create visually aesthetic green space and allowing for physical activity. Towns can also be modified to be pedestrian villages.
- Curb extensions: Curb extensions decrease the radii of the corners of the curb at intersections, calm traffic, and reduce the distance pedestrians have to cross. On streets with parking, curb extensions allow pedestrians to see oncoming traffic better where they otherwise would be forced to walk into the street to see past parked cars. Striped crosswalks, or zebra crossings, also provide safer crossings because they provide better visibility for both drivers and pedestrians. Improving crosswalk safety also increases walkability.
- Improving safety: Monitoring and improving safety in neighborhoods can make walking a more attractive option. Safety is the primary concern among children when choosing how to get to and from school. Ensuring safer walking areas by keeping paths well-maintained and well-lit can encourage walkability.
- Work from home: working from home completely eliminates any travel time associated with work and allows for people to use the time spent commuting, an average of 27.6 minutes in America. An increase in people working from home in recent years after the COVID 19 pandemic not only has cut down on fossil fuels burned, but also has other benefits like improving productivity.
- Improving destinations: Create a destination within walking distance of every home where people can partake in indoor and outdoor games, sports, dance, food, etc. Although exclusive to children, these destinations sometimes exist in the form of schools.

== Measuring ==
One way of assessing and measuring walkability is to undertake a walking audit. An established and widely used walking audit tool is PERS (Pedestrian Environment Review System) which has been used extensively in the UK.

A simple way to determine the walkability of a block, corridor or neighborhood is to count the number of people walking, lingering and engaging in optional activities within a space. This process is a vast improvement upon pedestrian level of service (LOS) indicators, recommended within the Highway Capacity Manual. However it may not translate well to non-Western locations where the idea of "optional" activities may be different. In any case, the diversity of people, and especially the presence of children, seniors and people with disabilities, denotes the quality, completeness and health of a walkable space.

A number of commercial walkability scores also exist:

- Walk Score is a company that creates a walkability index based on the distance to amenities such as grocery stores, schools, parks, libraries, restaurants, and coffee shops. Walk Score's algorithm awards maximum points to amenities within 5 minutes' walk (.25 mi), and a decay function assigns points for amenities up to 30 minutes away. Scores are normalized from 0 to 100.
- Walkonomics was a web app that combines open data and crowdsourcing to rate and review the walkability of each street. As of 2011, Walkonomics claimed to have ratings for every street in England (over 600,000 streets) and New York City., although it stopped service in 2018.
- RateMyStreet is a website that uses crowdsourcing, Google Maps and a five star rating system to allow users to rate the walkability of their local streets. Users can rate a street using eight different categories: Crossing the street, pavement/sidewalk width, trip hazards, wayfinding, safety from crime, road safety, cleanliness/attractiveness, and disabled peoples' access.

== Mapping ==
A newly developing concept is the transit time map (sometimes called a transit shed map), which is a type of isochrone map. These are maps (often online and interactive) that display the areas of a metropolis which can be reached from a given starting point, in a given amount of travel time. Such maps are useful for evaluating how well-connected a given address is to other possible urban destinations, or conversely, how large a territory can quickly get to a given address. The calculation of transit time maps is computationally intensive, and considerable work is being done on more efficient algorithms for quickly producing such maps.

To be useful, the production of a transit time map must take into consideration detailed transit schedules, service frequency, time of day, and day of week. Moreover, the recent development of computer vision and street view imagery has provided significant potential to automatically assess spaces for pedestrians from the ground level.

== See also ==
- Active living – Physically active way of life
- Active mobility – Unmotorised transport powered by activity
- Alley
- Cycling mobility – Bicycling as transportation
- Forced rider
- Free-range parenting
- Greening
- Jaywalking
- Living street – Traffic calming in spaces shared between road users
- Non-motorist
- Obesity and walking
- Right to mobility
- Street reclamation
- Sustainable Development Goal 11 – 11th of 17 Sustainable Development Goals for sustainable cities
- Trail ethics
- Urban vitality – Intensity of use of an urban area
- Walking distance measure
- Walking tour
- Pedestrian rights in India
