= James Kicklighter =

American film director

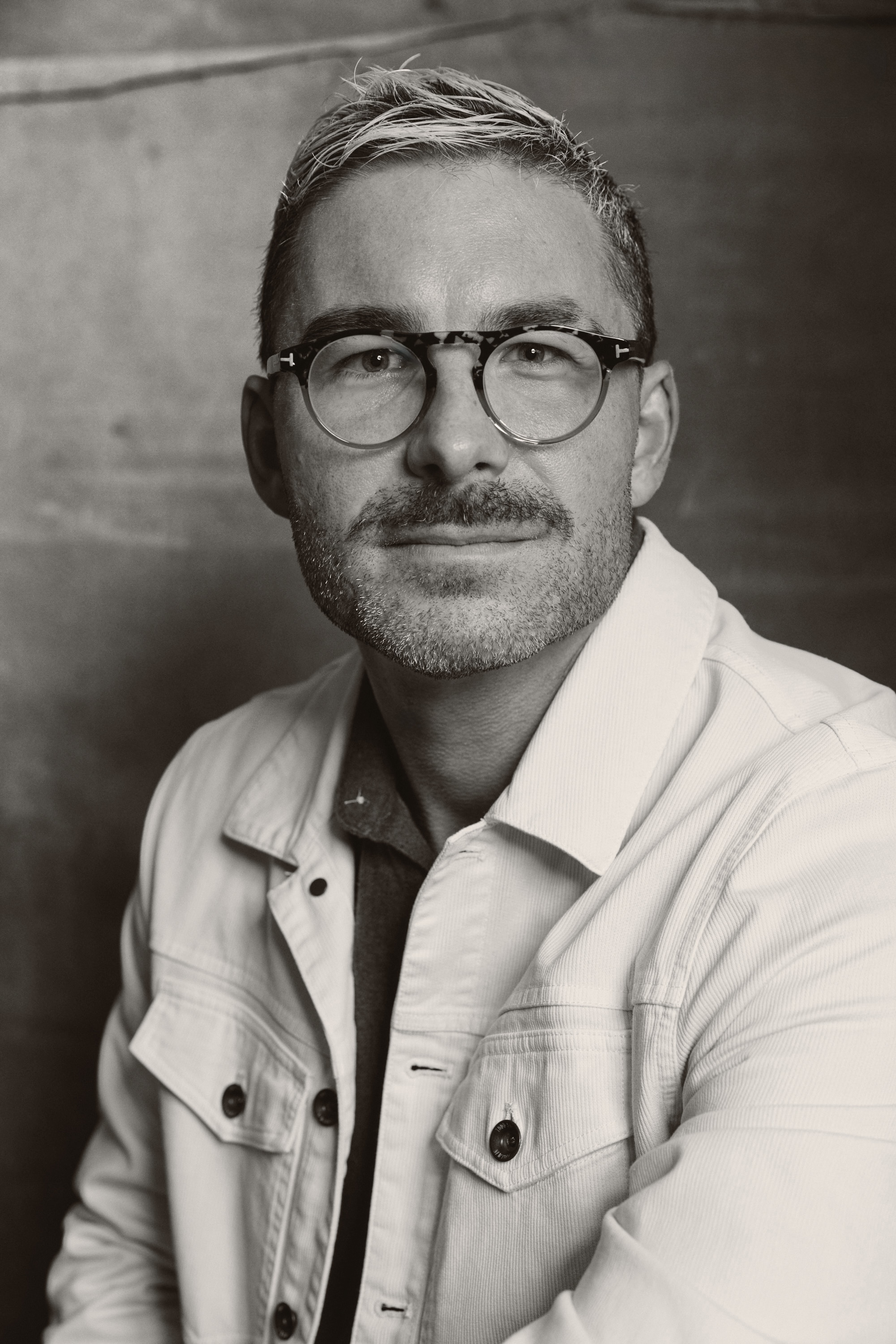
- Kicklighter in 2026.
- Born: June 26, 1988 (age 38); Bellville, Georgia
- Education: Georgia Southern University
- Years active: 2006–present

James Kicklighter (born June 26, 1988) is an American film director, producer, and writer from Bellville, Georgia.

== Early life and education ==
Kicklighter's hometown is in Bellville, Georgia. His father died from SARS when he was 12 years old. He graduated from Georgia Southern University with a degree in Public Relations.

== Career ==
He began his career at 18, as co-executive producer of That Guy: The Legacy of Dub Taylor, interviewing actress Dixie Carter, rocker John Mellencamp, director David Zucker, and actor Buck Taylor.

During his studies at Georgia Southern University, he collaborated with another student to film a documentary about the Golden Age of Radio for the Broadcast Education Association. While directing the film that became Theater of the Mind, he met Edith Ivey, who starred in his short film, The Car Wash.

The Car Wash won the Audience Choice Award at the National Film Festival for Talented Youth.

His short film Followed, based on the story by Will McIntosh, received an Audience Choice Award at the 2011 National Film Festival for Talented Youth, and was screened by Dragon Con, The Rome International Film Festival, Garden State Film Festival and Central Florida Festival, with international press coverage.

His 2012 film Final Acts was a finalist in the Macon Shorts Competition, part of the Gateway Macon Initiative. The film won Grand Prize.

His first feature film was the international crossover Desires of the Heart, which was produced by Jitenda Mishra and shot in Savannah, Georgia and Rajasthan, India in 2012. It was screened at film festivals in 2013 and 2014 including the Cannes Film Festival. The film was released in theaters across India in November 2015. It received award for Best Foreign Film at the La Femme Festival in Los Angeles.

In 2015, he released the documentary A Few Things About Cancer. The film won Best Short Documentary at the 2015 FirstGlance Los Angeles Film Festival.

His music video "Branches" for solo artist Shel Bee won Best Music Video at the 2016 Garden State Film Festival

After the 2016 Garden State Film Festival, Kicklighter directed the documentary Digital Edition, a profile on the future of journalism framed through The Atlanta Journal-Constitution. He was inspired to film the project after receiving an email from Bert Roughton Jr., Senior Managing Editor of The Atlanta Journal-Constitution.

He was the Virginia filmmaker for Hillary Clinton's 2016 presidential campaign. He filmed content for the campaign with public figures such as Michelle Kwan. He decided to direct the film The American Question after observing politics and voting during the campaign.

In 2017, he directed Angel of Anywhere, starring Briana Evigan, Ser'Darius Blain, David A. Gregory, and Axel Roldos. The project was a collaboration was a collaboration with director of photography Jonathan Pope.

He spoke about his start in filmmaking at the Directors Guild of America and the importance of networking in March 2018.

Kicklighter directed the feature documentary The Sound of Identity, profiling Lucia Lucas's performance of Don Giovanni at the Tulsa Opera for 2021 release. It received a rating of 91% on the review aggregator site Rotten Tomatoes.

Kicklighter is set to direct a biopic about athlete and coach Erk Russell, who revived the football program at Georgia Southern University.

== Personal life ==
Bag company JAMAH named The Kicklighter bag in his honor. He currently resides in Los Angeles, California.

== Filmography ==
Year	Title	Type	Producer	Writer	Director	Ref(s)
2007	That Guy: The Legacy of Dub Taylor	Documentary film	Yes			
2009	Di Passaggio	Documentary film	Yes		Yes	
2009	Theater of the Mind	Documentary short			Yes	
2010	The Car Wash	Short film	Yes	Yes	Yes	
2011	Followed	Short film	Yes		Yes	
2011	Final Acts	Short film	Yes	Yes	Yes	
2013	Desires of the Heart	Feature film		Yes	Yes	
2014	A Few Things About Cancer	Documentary short	Yes		Yes	
2015	Shel Bee: Branches	Music video	Yes	Yes	Yes	
2015	Atul: Emotions	Music video	Yes	Yes	Yes	
2016	Digital Edition	Documentary short	Yes		Yes	
2018	Angel of Anywhere	Short film	Yes		Yes	
2019	Every 9 Hours	Short film	Yes	Yes		
2020	The Sound of Identity	Documentary film			Yes	
2024	The American Question	Documentary film	Yes	Yes	Yes	
