= Lawrence D. Frank =

American urban planner

Lawrence Douglas Frank
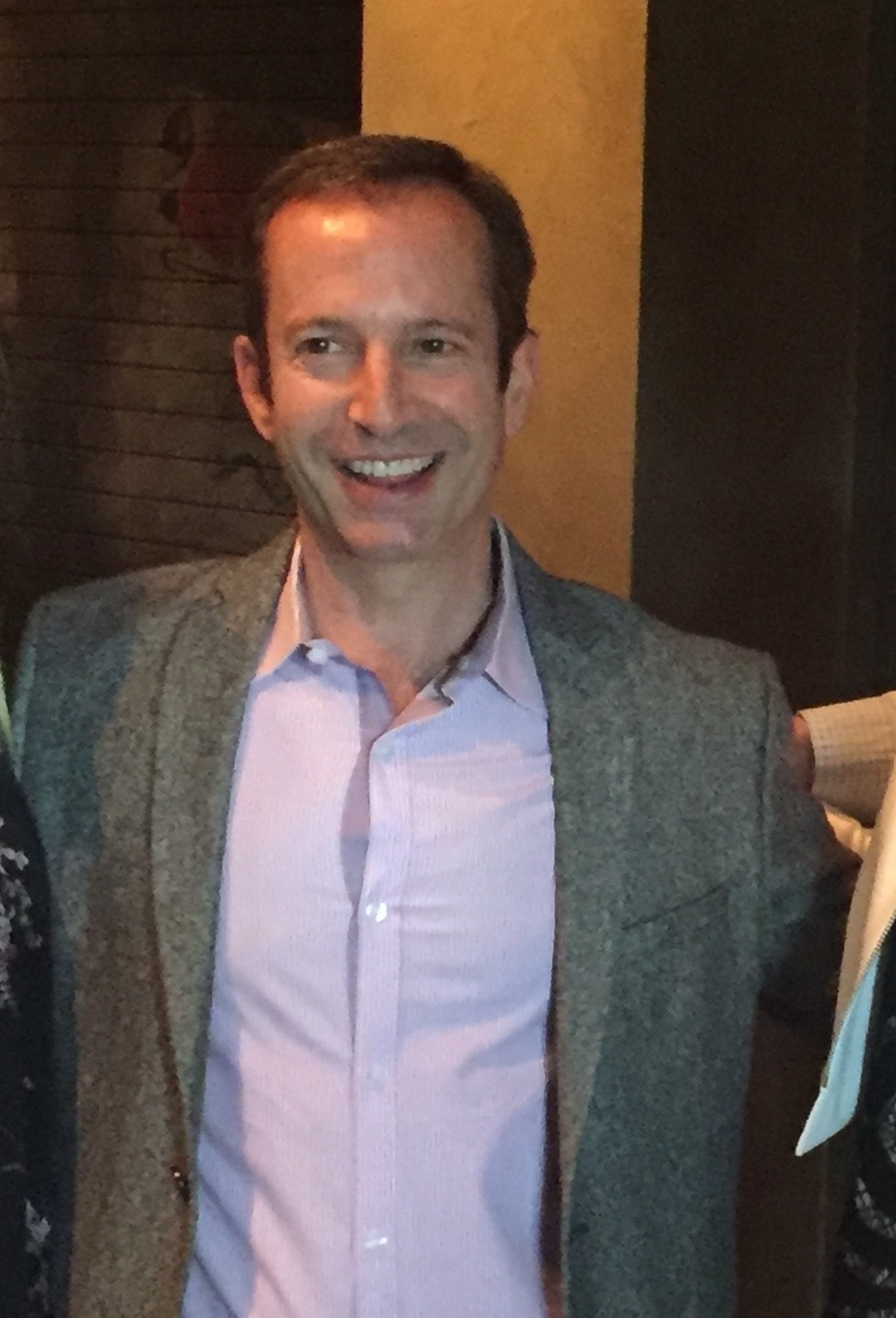
- Frank in 2017
- Born: April 14, 1961 (age 65)
- Education: University of Arizona: Bachelor of Landscape Architecture (1985); University of Washington: Masters of Science in Civil Engineering Transportation Studies (1990); University of Washington: Ph.D. of Urban Design and Planning (1993)
- Occupations: Urban Planner, Consultant, Researcher, Educator
- Employer(s): Washington State Department of Transportation: Transportation Planning Specialist IV; Georgia Institute of Technology: Associate Professor; University of British Columbia: Professor and Bombardier Chair; Urban Design 4 Health: Founder and President; University of California San Diego: Professor
- Known for: Walkability research
- Website: https://urbandesign4health.com/

Lawrence Douglas Frank (April 14, 1961) is an American and Canadian urban planner, researcher, and educator. Frank helped popularize the term walkability through his work, which established quantitative links among urban design, time spent driving in a car versus walking and biking, taking public transit, and public health, especially obesity. Frank has been a university professor for over 30 years and founded and is president of Urban Design 4 Health. He consults with government agencies, NGOs, and decision makers to predict travel, greenhouse gases, chronic disease, and economic impacts of land use and transportation policies.

Frank has published over 200 peer-reviewed articles, led over $20 million in primary research, co-authored two books, and contributed four book chapters. Frank's work has been cited 58,699 times, he was the top-cited scholar in transport policy, and was the fourth most-cited scholar in urban planning. He had the second-highest h-index among urban planning faculty globally, and was ranked by Clarivate as being in the top 1% of highly cited researchers in the social sciences.

Frank has served on the board of AmericaWalks since 2016. He was named by the University of Arizona's College of Architecture, Planning, and Landscape Architecture as Alumnus of the Year and featured in a biographical video.

== Early life and education ==
Frank was born on April 14, 1961 in Rochester, New York to Marilyn E. (née Ellowitch) and Irwin N. Frank. Irwin (born March 24, 1927) was a urologist, professor, and chief medical officer at the University of Rochester Medical Center. Marilyn (born July 4, 1931) was a fundraiser for health charities and founded Friends of Strong Memorial Hospital and the National Kidney Foundation serving Upstate and Western New York.

Frank was the youngest of three siblings. His oldest brother Gary David was born on September 5, 1955 and died on September 22, 2024. His brother Steven was born in 1957.

Frank graduated in 1985 with a bachelor's in Landscape Architecture from the University of Arizona's School of Renewable Natural Resources. In 1990 he earned a Master of Science in Civil Engineering Transportation Studies from the University of Washington's School of Civil Engineering. Frank continued at the University of Washington to earn a Ph.D. in Urban Design and Planning from the College of Architecture and Urban Planning in 1993.

== Employment ==
After earning his Ph.D., Frank became a transportation planning specialist in 1993 for the Office of Urban Mobility in the Washington State Department of Transportation. In 1995, Frank took an assistant professor position at Georgia Tech in the College of Architecture City Planning Program. In 2001, Frank became an associate professor in the same department.

In 1997, Frank founded Urban Design 4 Health. The company was active as of January 2026 with Frank as its president.

Starting in 2003, Frank became associate professor at the University of British Columbia (UBC) as the Bombardier Chair in the School of Community and Regional Planning. In 2010, he became a full UBC professor, added the School of Population and Public Health to his portfolio, and became director of the Health and Community Design Lab at UBC.

In 2020, Frank left UBC and became a professor in the Department of Urban Studies and Planning at the University of California, San Diego.

== 1994: Urban Design and Walking, Transit Use, Driving ==
Frank had 16 articles, books, or book chapters cited nearly 1,000 times or more between 1994 and 2025. The earliest among these was Frank's dissertation research, published in 1994 with co-author Gary Pivo (1,763 citations): Impacts of Mixed Use and Density on Utilization of Three Modes of Travel: Single-Occupant Vehicle, Transit, and Walking. The authors reported how single occupancy vehicle usage for work and shopping trips decreased, and walking and transit use increased, as employment and population density and land-use mix increased. The study laid the groundwork for measuring walkability, or how people walked and rode public transportation more when they lived in areas with more concentrated housing and jobs. These quantitative findings strongly implied that urban planning could be used to increase walking and transit use by increasing housing and business density. They provided new quantitative support for urban planners to use higher density designs.

== 2001: Urban Design and Personal Health ==
Frank co-authored two frequently cited articles in 2001. One was Environmental and Societal Factors Affect Food Choice and Physical Activity: Rationale, Influences, and Leverage Points (1,055 citations). The study was authored by 13 experts who formed a panel to integrate research on personal health and urban design. The group engaged in three knowledge mapping exercises. They proposed policy priorities to improve personal health by influencing the choices people make regarding physical activity and nutrition. The group highlighted the complex nature of physical activity and nutrition decision making, and the personal and social resistance to change. They called for expansive additional research.

The other was published with Peter Engelke: The Built Environment and Human Activity Patterns: Exploring the Impacts of Urban Form on Public Health (975 citations). It linked urban design to health in three steps. First, a literature review conclusively indicated that significant public health benefits could be achieved through increased levels of daily, moderate physical activity such as walking and biking. Second, the authors showed that moderate physical activity can be increased through urban design. Third, they drew attention to unfortunate urban design trends that favor motorized travel and minimize or undermine walking and biking. In contrast, they pointed to cities (often European) that use bike lanes, reduce vehicle speed limits, restrict parking in downtown areas, etc. and consequently have more walking and biking. The authors concluded with an appeal for more rigorous quantitative research using Geographic Information System (GIS) data to measure urban form, and GPS and accelerometry data to track travel and activity levels.

== 2003: Community Design and Walking, Cycling ==
In 2003, Frank was the lead author of his first book, with co-authors Peter Engelke and Tom Schmid: Health and Community Design: The Impact of the Built Environment on Physical Activity (1,221 citations). The book examines how community design encourages or discourages physical activity. It draws upon multi-disciplinary studies on the relationships between urban design and public health. Factors are specified that influence personal decisions about physical activity and modes of travel. The authors identify how land use patterns can be changed to help overcome barriers to physical activity, and recommend future research.

Frank's all-time most frequently cited article (3,396 citations) was published in 2003 and co-authored with Brian Saelens and James Sallis: Environmental Correlates of Walking and Cycling: Findings From the Transportation, Urban Design, and Planning Literature. The article targeted health and physical activity professionals, and summarized key terms and research methods used by urban design and transportation professionals. The article explained that quasi-experimental research designs were necessary in urban design. It showed that walking and cycling trips increased in high- versus low-walkable neighborhoods. Population density was found to be the most consistent positive correlate with walking trip frequency, although a mix of residential, commercial, and park density could ultimately prove to be more significant. Future research was called for that integrated environmental variables into health and physical activity research.

== 2004: Community Design, Physical Activity, and Obesity ==
In 2004, Frank had three oft-cited publications, including his second most-cited publication (2,641 citations): Obesity Relationships with Community Design, Physical Activity, and Time Spent in Cars. This study, co-authored with Martin A. Andresen, and Thomas L. Schmid, summarized the analysis of travel survey data from 10,878 participants in the Atlanta region between 2000 and 2002. The team found that the odds of obesity decreased by 12.2% for each quartile increase in residential density, and by 4.8% for each additional kilometer walked per day. Each additional hour spent in a car per day increased the odds of obesity by 6%. Black participants reported they walked nearly twice as much as their white counterparts yet were far more likely to be obese. The study presented the first assessment of urban forms around each participant's place of residence, with travel patterns, body mass index (BMI), and obesity status.

In a 2026 commentary on the Frank et al. 2004 Obesity Relationships article, deputy editor of American Journal of Preventive Medicine Margaret B. Nolan describes it as: ... remarkably prescient. It manages to foreshadow the next 2 decades of obesity and physical activity research, as well as introduce new methods of characterizing and considering the built environment's role in chronic disease. ... The concept of "connectedness," illustrated so beautifully in Figure 1 of the paper by Frank et al., has guided the planning and execution of thousands of neighborhoods across the U.S. since 2004.

His second highly-cited 2004 publication (1,400 citations) was a book written with co-authors Howard Frumkin and Richard J. Jackson: Urban Sprawl and Public Health: Designing, Planning, and Building for Healthy Communities. The authors examine the evidence surrounding how urban sprawl impacts human health and well-being, and discuss how to improve public health through better design, land use, and transportation.

Frank's third highly-cited 2004 publication (986 citations) with co-authors James F. Sallis, Brian E. Saelens, and M. Katherine Kraft was: Active Transportation and Physical Activity: Opportunities for Collaboration on Transportation and Public Health Research. The authors' literature summary showed that transportation research consistently links neighborhood environment (e.g., residential density) to walking and cycling, and that increased walking and cycling and reduced car riding are tied to health benefits such as lower obesity risk and cleaner air.

== 2005: Enhanced Activity, Walkability, and Nutrition ==
Frank published two frequently cited articles in 2005. The first one (2,222 citations) with co-authors Schmid, Sallis, Chapman, and Saelens, was: Linking Objectively Measured Physical Activity with Objectively Measured Urban Form: Findings from SMARTRAQ. This study enhanced physical activity measurement by using accelerometers with objective GIS-based built environment metrics (rather than self-reporting). It was conducted over a two-day period for 357 adults in Atlanta. It also integrated multiple community design variables into a walkability index. The study found that participants in the most walkable areas of Atlanta were 2.4 times more likely to get recommended amounts of physical activity. The authors concluded that people who live in better connected, more compact, mixed-use neighborhoods are more likely to be active enough to achieve health benefits.

Frank's second highly cited article in 2005 (1,875 citations) with co-authors Glanz, Sallis, and Saelens was: Healthy Nutrition Environments: Concepts and Measures. Given an obesity epidemic in the US, the authors explore ways to measure how living environments impact nutrition. They proposed four types of nutrition environments: community (e.g., outlet types and accessibility), organization (e.g., home, school, work), consumer (availability and price of healthy food options), and information (media, advertising). Measures and studies that offer the most promise as indicated from prior research for each nutritional environment were identified.

== 2006: Walkability and BMI, Air Pollution ==
Frank published two oft-cited articles in 2006. The first one, Many Pathways from Land Use to Health, had 1,921 citations. The article's context was that single-use, low-density land development and disconnected street networks impede walking and transit use, which in turn diminishes health. Data was gathered for King County and Seattle, Washington. Data covered three concepts: walkability index, body mass index (BMI), and walking or biking activity. The walkability index had four components: net residential density, street connectivity, land use mix, and retail floor area ratio (FAR, a new addition to the index). The walkability index was built from Census and King County databases. Self-report data were used for the other two concepts. The researchers found that a 5% increase in walkability was associated with a 32.1% increase in time spent walking or biking, a .23-point reduction in BMI, 6.5% reduction in vehicle miles driven, 5.6% reduction in grams of nitrogen oxides emissions, and a 5.5% emission reduction of volatile organic compounds (VOCs).

Frank's other highly referenced article of 2006 (1,106 citations), with co-authors Cerin, Saelens, and Sallis, was Neighborhood Environment Walkability Scale: Validity and Development of a Short Form. In this technical study, 1,286 adults were recruited to participate in King County, Washington. A 68-question survey (Neighborhood Environment Walkability Scale, NEWS), and a shorter version (NEWS-A) were tested for factorial and criterion validity. Adequate levels of validity were found for both, and alternative survey scoring methods were identified for various purposes.

== 2007: Reliability and Replicability ==
Two highly cited articles were published by Frank in 2007. The first one, with co-authors Glanz, Sallis, and Saelens (1,055 citations) was Nutrition Environment Measures Survey in Stores (NEMS-S): Development and Evaluation. The NEMS-S tool is used to assess the presence of food stores, and the availability of healthy options in those stores. The researchers tested the reliability of the tool and whether it could detect healthy eating patterns by neighborhood residents. The researchers verified that NEMS-S was a reliable tool and recommended its use to assist in examining the contributors to healthy eating behavior.

The other oft-cited article by Frank in 2007 (1,031 citations), with co-authors Leslie, Coffee, Owen, Bauman, and Hugo, was Walkability of Local Communities: Using Geographic Information Systems to Objectively Assess Relevant Environmental Attributes. This study examined whether Frank's walkability index from a decade earlier could be replicated in Australia using geographic information systems (GIS) data rather than self-reporting. The researchers concluded that GIS data was deployed effectively in the walkability index, but it requires detailed land use and census data as well as substantial data processing resources.

== 2010, 2016: Validity and Global Relevance ==
More recent highly-cited articles by Frank were published in 2010 and 2016. The Development of a Walkability Index: Application to the Neighborhood Quality of Life Study (2010) had 1,683 citations and was published with co-authors Sallis, Saelens, Leary, Cain, Conway, and Hess. This study tested the GIS-based walkability index with survey data from the Neighborhood Quality of Life Study (NQLS). The index's construct validity was strongly supported, and the study reinforced prior research: the number of reported walking trips was 6.45 times greater in the highest compared to lowest decile of walkability. And household vehicle miles travelled was 52% lower in the highest compared to lowest decile of walkability.

In 2016, Frank co-authored Physical Activity in Relation to Urban Environments in 14 Cities Worldwide: A Cross-Sectional Study with 20 others (1,654 citations). Physical inactivity is responsible for more than 5 million deaths per year globally. The researchers sought to document how urban design was related to physical activity. They used data from the International Physical Activity and Environment Network, which included 6,822 adults from 14 cities in 10 countries. Four environmental/urban design variables were found to be significantly related to physical activity: net residential density, intersection density, public transport density, and number of parks. The researchers concluded that planning in the urban, transportation, and parks sectors could help reduce the burden of the global physical inactivity pandemic.

== Urban Design 4 Health ==
Frank founded Urban Design 4 Health (UD4H) in 1997. UD4H is a research, development, and consulting firm in urban planning, transportation, and public health. The firm pioneered the application of scientific evidence linking transportation and land use actions with health and related economic outcomes. It conducts foundational research and develops data-driven analytic tools that examine the relationships between built environments, natural spaces, and social systems and their impact on community health, walkability, and active transportation.

In 2020, UD4H produced the national block group level Smart Location Database (SLD) which maps walkability for the entire USA. In 2021 UD4H developed and validated the road network based walkability algorithms provided to WalkScore.

In 2023 and 2025, UD4H was assigned two patents for inventions by Frank and co-inventors Chapman, Iroz-Elardo, and E-Sok Hong. Their methods and systems apply AI to digital images to identify the presence of pedestrian design features (seating, sidewalks, crossings, trees) and examine their relationships with physical activity, health, and cost.

== Books and Book Chapters ==
Frank has published two books:

1. Health and Community Design: The Impacts of the Built Environment on Physical Activity. Lawrence D. Frank, Peter E. Engelke, and Tom L. Schmid. Island Press, 2003.
2. Urban Sprawl and Public Health: Designing, Planning, and Building for Healthy Communities. Howard Frumkin, Lawrence D. Frank, and Richard J. Jackson. Island Press, 2004.

He has also published four book chapters:

1. Urban Environment and Obesity by Katherine R. White and Lawrence D. Frank. In: Handbook of Obesity, 5th edition, volume 1, part 4, chapter 43. Editors: Claude Bouchard and George A. Bray, 2023.
2. Healthy Communities by Lawrence D. Frank. In: Independent for Life: Homes and Neighborhoods for an Aging America, chapter 13. Editors: Henry Cisneros, Jane Hickie, Margaret Dyer-Chamberlain. University of Texas Press, 2013.
3. Vancouver the City and Vancouver the Region by Lawrence D. Frank and Alexander Y. Bigazzi. In: Planning on the Edge, Chapter 5, Transportation, pp. 125–143. University of British Columbia Press, 2019.
4. Complete and Healthy Streets by Lawrence D. Frank, Jared Ulmer, Bruce Appleyard, Alexander Y. Bigazzi. In: The New Companion to Urban Design, Chapter 34. Editors: Anastasia Loukaitou-Sideris and Tridib Banerjee. Routledge imprint of Taylor & Francis, 2019.

== Professional Distinctions ==
- Top ranked Urban Planning academic (by h-index) in North America in 2024.
- In the top 1% globally of highly cited researchers in the social sciences as ranked by Clarivate (was Thomson Reuters) in 2026.
- Top-cited academic in Transport Policy by Google Scholar in 2026.
- Top-five most cited academic in Urban Planning by Google Scholar in 2026.
- Honorary Professor Healthy Cities, Hong Kong University College of Architecture, 2021–2026.
- Honorary Visiting Professorship, University College London, 2015–2020.
- Bombardier Chairholder in Sustainable Transportation, University of British Columbia, 2002–2020.
- Alumni of the Year, University of Arizona, July 2013.
- Journal of Planning Literature Top 10 Most Cited Article Award, 2013.
- Social Science and Medicine Top Tier Cited Article Award, 2008–April 2013.
- Non-resident Fellow of the Brookings Institution, 2007–2011.
- Citation Abstract Award, Society of Behavioral Medicine, March 2006.
- Urban Sprawl and Public Health Top 10 Books: Planetizen, September 2005.
- Outstanding Research and Scholarship Award, Georgia Tech, May 1999.
- Sustainable Site Design Award, Atlantic Steel Redevelopment, American Institute of Architects, 1999.
- Award of Distinction, American Institute of Architects, 1999.

== Editorial Review Boards ==
- Environmental Research: Health, 2024–Present.
- Journal of Transport and Health, lead guest editor, special issue on Built Environment, 2016.
- Journal of Transportation and Health, 2013–2018.
- Journal of Transportation and Land Use, 2007–2012.
- American Journal of Preventive Medicine, 2003–2015.
- Journal of the American Planning Association, 1998–2007.

== Speaking Engagement Videos, Article Quotes ==
Frank has been a speaker or quoted in multiple venues and publications.

- Electric Cars Won't Fix Sitting: The Health Costs of Designing Cities Around Cars. University of California News, 2026.
- The Land Use/Walkability Connection with Dr. Lawrence Frank. Hosted by America Walks, with transcript. 2022.
- Larry Frank: New Research on the Health Impacts of Land Use and Transportation. Hosted by City of Adelaide, Australia, 2014.
- Weighing In on City Planning. Frank is featured along with other urban planning and health experts. ScienceNews, 2007.
- America's Obesity Crisis: Exercise: The Walking Cure. Covers highlights from the 2004 Obesity Relationships study. Time Magazine, 2004.
- Concrete Doesn’t Spend Money, People Do. The Talking Headways Podcast at Streetsblog USA, 2026.
