= The Last Color =

- Film poster
- Directed by: Vikas Khanna
- Screenplay by: Vibhav Srivastava
- Story by: Vikas Khanna
- Produced by: Jitendra Mishra; Bindu Khanna; Poonam Kaul
- Starring: Neena Gupta; Aqsa Siddiqui
- Cinematography: Subhranshu Das
- Edited by: Archit D Rastogi
- Music by: Mahesh Bharti
- Production company: House of Omkar
- Release date: January 4, 2019 (Palm Springs International Film Festival)
- Running time: 90 minutes
- Countries: India, USA
- Language: Hindi

The Last Color is an Indian feature film produced and directed by Indian American chef Vikas Khanna. The film addresses an age-old taboo surrounding widows in Vrindavan and in Varanasi. It deals with how a 9-year old tightrope walker befriends one such widow and promises to add color to her life. The film was adapted from Khanna's own book The Last Color published by Bloomsbury Publishing. Several students from Banaras Hindu University also worked as interns on this project.

== Plot ==
The story unfolds in the city of Varanasi, India where Chhoti, a nine-year-old tightrope walker and flower seller, dreams of saving 300 rupees ($4), so that she can attend school. She faces a daily struggle for survival along with her best friend Chintu. Chhoti befriends Noor, a white-clad widow who suffers a life of total abstinence and is prohibited from taking part in any festivities, especially Holi, the Indian festival of colors. Chotti tries to arrange a meeting between Anarkali, a trans woman who is brutally raped over and again by the local police named Raja, and Noor, whom she has recently befriended. Raja blackmails Anarkali into submission by threatening to rape Chotti who Anarkali is very fond of. Over time, Choti and Noor's friendship gets stronger and breaks the barriers of caste system but Noor and Anarkali never meet.

Noor encourages the brave little girl to face life by "flying high" with courage, education and dignity. She shares her fondest, but closely kept childhood memories of playing with colors. Chhoti promises Noor that, this Holi, she will splash colors on her. But on Holi's eve, Noor passes away, and during a sweep, Chhoti is imprisoned by the corrupt police, led by Raja who is trying to pin Anarkali's murder on Chotti who witnessed him murder the trans woman. Will Chhoti be able to keep her promise made to Noor?

Twenty-four years later, Chhoti becomes an advocate and fights for societal reforms that would bring about rehabilitation of both street children and widows after having won a case for trans women. The Last Color is a story of promises kept and promises broken, a friendship that knows no bounds, and the freedom and victory of the human spirit.

== Cast ==
- Neena Gupta as Noor
- Rudrani Chettri as Anarkali
- Aqsa Siddiqui as Chhoti
- Rajeswar Khanna as Chintu
- Aslam Shekh as Raja
- Neha Garg as Rekha Saxena
- Princy Sudhakaran as Chhoti
- Vajid Ali as Chintu

== Location ==
This film was shot in Varanasi, Uttar Pradesh of India.

== Screenings ==
1. Premiered at the 30th Palm Springs International Film Festival, USA on 4 January 2019.
2. 13th Dallas International Film Festival
3. Indie Meme Film Festival
4. 2019 Atlanta Film Festival
5. Closing night film at the New York Indian Film Festival
6. Special Screening at the United Nations HQ
7. Washington DC South Asian Film Festival
8. Opening night film at Chicago South Asian Film Festival
9. Mumbai Film Festival
10. New Jersey Indian & International Film Festival

== Awards ==
- Director's Vision Award, 16th Indian Film Festival Stuttgart
- Best Feature Film, Dallas International Film Festival
