= Desires of the Heart (2013 film) =

- Film poster
- Directed by: James Kicklighter
- Screenplay by: Solila Parida; John Howbrook; Mark Ezra Stokes; James Kicklighter
- Story by: Dr. Prasanna K. Pati
- Produced by: Solila Parida; Jitendra mishra Juan David Manotas
- Starring: Val Lauren; Alicia Minshew
- Cinematography: Tim Gill
- Edited by: Anthony Guerrero
- Production company: DOTH Entertainment LLC
- Release dates: 18 October 2013 (LA Femme); 6 November 2015 (India)
- Running time: 88 minutes
- Countries: India; United States
- Language: English

Desires of the Heart is a 2013 English independent film directed by James Kicklighter and co-directed in India with Rajesh Rathi. It stars Hollywood actors Val Lauren, Alicia Minshew alongside Bollywood actors Harsh Mayar, Gulshan Grover and Ankit Bhardwaj. The film began production in 2012 in Savannah, Georgia, United States. and was later shot in Bikaner, Rajasthan, India.

== Plot ==
Dr. Kris Sharma (Val Lauren) is a psychiatrist from India practicing in Savannah, Georgia when he meets Madeline (Alicia Minshew), a local artist with a mysterious past. While their relationship begins to blossom in America, Kris is summoned home by his brother (Gulshan Grover) to marry the woman (Priya Ahuja) chosen by his parents. But as he begins to make decisions about his future, he discovers centuries old secrets that may seal the fate of his destiny.

== Cast ==
- Val Lauren as Dr. Krishh
- Alicia Minshew as Madeline
- Harsh Mayar as Nanu
- Gulshan Grover as Pradeep
- Priya Ahuja as Lena
- Ankit Bhardwaj as Gopal
- Archana Gupta as Radha

== Release ==
Desires of the Heart premiered during the 2014 Cannes Film Festival on 17 May 2014 in the Marche' du Films. and was released in theaters across India on November 6, 2015, by Luminosity Pictures

=== Critical reception ===
Indyred.com gave the film 4.5 stars out of 5 and wrote, "Desires Of The Heart is a damn near perfect Indie production in my eyes. All the pieces are there, and puzzled together in an expert way". Film Threat gave 3.5 stars and wrote, "Sometimes Desires of the Heart feels like one of those films where its narrative ambition gets the better of it, but there are indeed moments of mastery to be found throughout. It’s a strong film, and I’d rather have a film take risks and not quite always work for me than simply play it safe and mediocre". Independent Critic gave it 2.5 stars out of 4 and wrote, "Desires of the Heart is a beautiful and involving film featuring two fine performances by its leads".

== Awards and nominations ==
Wins

- Best Foreign Film, LA Femme International Film Festival, California, 2013

Nominations

- Best Screenplay (Solila Parida), Hoboken International Film Festival, NY, 2014
- Best Supporting Actress (Alicia Minshew), Hoboken International Film Festival, NY, 2014

=== Official Selection ===
- Central Florida Film Festival, 2014
- Hoboken International Film Festival, 2014
- Sedona International Film Festival, 2014
- Macon Film Festival, 2014
- LA Femme International Film Festival, 2013
