= Jitendra Mishra =

Indian film producer and promoter (born 1979)

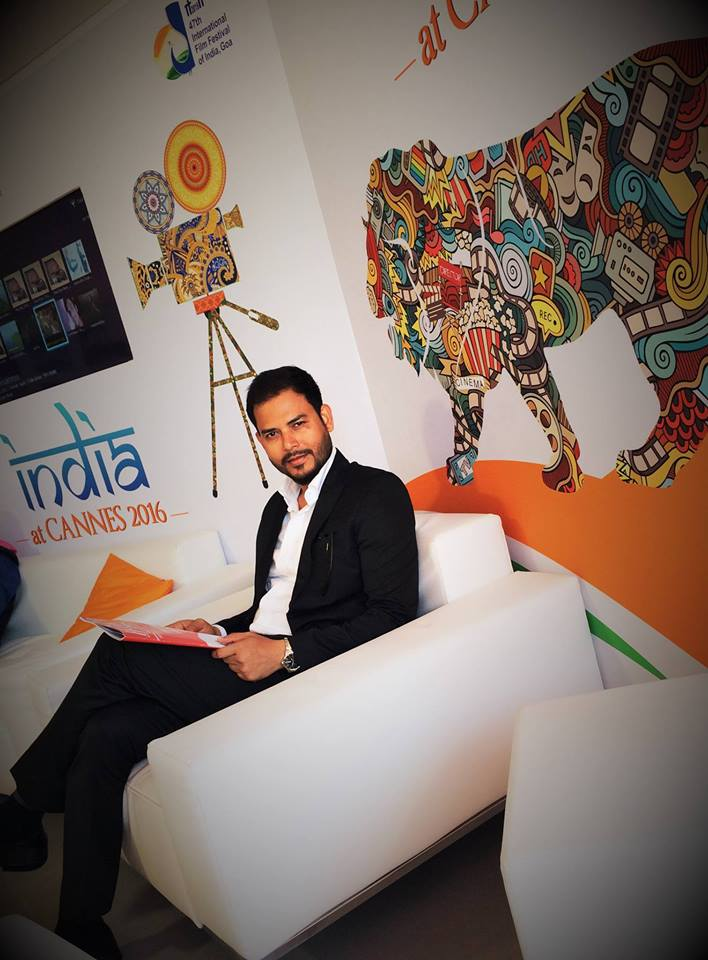
- Jitendra Mishra at 69th Cannes Film Festival (panel discussion in India pavilion)
- Born: Titlagarh, Bolangir, Odisha, India
- Occupations: Producer, Promoter
- Years active: 2000–present
- Spouse: Donna Deb Mishra

Jitendra Mishra is an Indian filmmaker, producer and promoter, born in Titlagarh, Odisha. He is known for The Last Color, Desires of the Heart and Human OAK the only Indo-Italian film co-produced during the Covid-19 lockdown.

== Early life ==
He was born in Titlagarh, a small town in Western Odisha to Radha Madhab Mishra and Saudamini Mishra. Jitendra is the youngest of six siblings. In 2000 he graduated in Law from Balangir Law College and did his Masters in Commerce from Rajendra College Balangir, Sambalpur University and went to Delhi.

== Career ==
Jitendra started his career as a production assistant in a Delhi-based production house and after two years he founded his own production house in 2002. Award winning film I Am Kalam produced by Smile Foundation was his debut as a feature film. His production The Last Color written and directed by Michelin Star Chef Vikas Khanna was a huge success both in box office and international festivals winning several awards and accolades. The film was premiered at the 30th Palm Springs International Film Festival and has been selected in more than 50 different film festivals and forums worldwide. His filmography also includes Hollywood film Desires of the Heart (2013 film) directed by James Kicklighter, starring Val Lauren and Alicia Minshew, Italian film Human OAK, Buried Seeds, Maiya, Bhor and Aasma among others. Jitendra Mishra has designed and implemented several international festivals, forums, workshops and campaigns including North East Film festival in all the 8 North East States of India and Meghalaya Film Festival, for Children’s Film Society India in association with Smile Foundation. He has been the festival director of the film festival siffcy that he has designed for Smile Foundation, currently he is the elected President of the oldest and largest global media network of professionals and organisations working for young people CIFEJ that was formed under the auspices of UNESCO in 1955 in Brussels and currently headquartered at Athens, Greece. He has been a Member of Producers Network - Marche Du Films at Cannes Film Festival since 2013 and invited as a jury member to more than 50 international film festivals so far.

== Production, distribution & promotion ==
=== Filmography ===
Year	Major Titles	Role
2025	Whispers of the Mountains	Producer
2025	The Saint of Brooklyn	Producer
2025	Yet Another Mohenjodaro	Presenter/Producer
2023	The Silent Epidemic	Producer
2022	Zilla Balangir	Producer
2021	Barefoot Empress	Producer
2020	Human OAK	Producer
2019	The Last Color	Producer
2018	Delhi Dreams	Producer
2018	Bhor	Consultant: Sales, Distribution
2018	Halkaa	Creative Producer, Consultant
2017	Buried Seeds-Vikas Khanna	Co-Producer
2017	Ishu	Executive Producer
2017	Maiya	Consulting Producer
2015	Kajarya	Consultant:Sales, Distribution
2015	Goatspeak	Consultant:Sales, Distribution
2014	Aasma	Executive Producer
2014	Chausar	Consultant:Sales, Distribution
2013	Desires of the Heart	Co-Producer, Marketing, Distribution
2011	I am Kalam	Associate Producer, Marketing, Distribution

== Major Honors and recognition ==
Year	Award	Note
2023	71st National Film Awards	By NFDC, Ministry of I&B , Govt. of India
2022	Golden Star Icon Award	By AVIVA Keeon, Delhi
2018	Mathkhai Samman	By Bhumika, Theatre festival
2015	Son of Odisha (Odia Yuva)	By Odia Pua, New Delhi
2013	Kumuda Samman	By Kumuda Mahotshav
2010	Young Jury Award	At IFFI, Goa
