= John McKay (Ontario politician, born 1948) =

Canadian politician

The Honourable John McKay PC
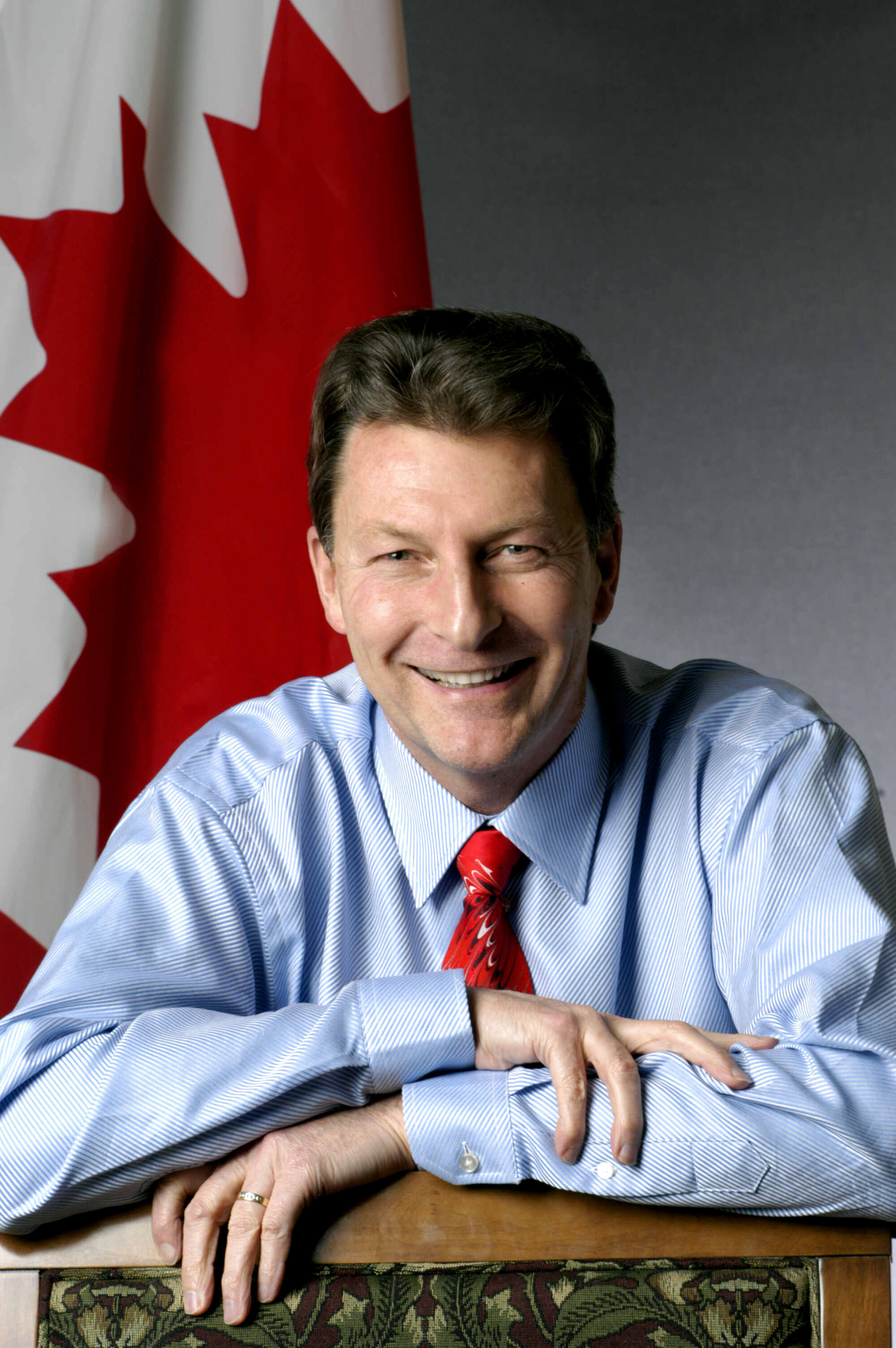
- Official portrait, 2008

Parliamentary Secretary to the Minister of National Defence
- In office December 2, 2015 – January 27, 2017
- Minister: Harjit Sajjan
- Preceded by: James Bezan
- Succeeded by: Jean Rioux

Member of Parliament for Scarborough-Guildwood Scarborough East (1997-2004)
- In office June 2, 1997 – March 23, 2025
- Preceded by: Doug Peters
- Succeeded by: Riding dissolved

Chair of the Standing Committee on Government Operations & Estimates
- In office September 30, 2010 – June 8, 2011
- Minister: Rona Ambrose
- Preceded by: Yasmin Ratansi
- Succeeded by: Pat Martin

Personal details
- Born: John Norman McKay; March 21, 1948 (age 78) Toronto, Ontario, Canada
- Party: Liberal
- Spouse: Carolyn Dartnell
- Education: University of Toronto (BA), Queen's University (LLB)
- Profession: Lawyer

John Norman McKay PC (born March 21, 1948) is a Canadian lawyer and politician. He was the Liberal Member of Parliament for the riding of Scarborough-Guildwood from 1997 to 2025. McKay was Parliamentary Secretary to the Minister of Finance from 2003 to 2006 during the government of Paul Martin, then served as an opposition MP and critic until November 2015 during the government of Stephen Harper. He currently serves as Chair of the Standing Committee on National Defence; Chair of the Canadian Section of the Canada-United States Permanent Joint Board on Defence; and Co-Chair of the Canada-United States Inter-Parliamentary Group.

McKay was sworn in as a member of the Queen's Privy Council for Canada on December 12, 2003, and carries the designations of Honourable and Privy Councillor (PC) for life.

Born in Toronto, Ontario, McKay has lived most of his life in Scarborough district of Toronto. He has a Bachelor of Arts degree from the University of Toronto and a Bachelor of Laws degree from Queen's University. He attends an evangelical church in Toronto.

After practising private law, he was elected to represent Scarborough East in 1997 and was re-elected in 2000. In 2003 the Scarborough East riding was abolished and McKay went on to win election to the new Scarborough—Guildwood riding in 2004. McKay has been re-elected in each subsequent elections for the riding, most recently in 2021.

== Early life and career ==
A lifelong resident of Scarborough, McKay went to five of the area's public schools. He attended and graduated at Sir Wilfrid Laurier Collegiate Institute. McKay attended the Scarborough campus of the University of Toronto where he earned his Bachelor of Arts. He later earned his Bachelor of Laws from Queen's University. After completing his degree he went into private practice as a real estate attorney, assuming positions of leadership in the legal community. Most notably, he was the President of the Durham Bar Association, an Executive Member of County and District Law Association, Real Estate Executive of the Canadian Bar Association, and a member of the Law Society of Upper Canada's Committee on Title Insurance.

== Election to Federal Parliament ==
McKay was first elected to the House of Commons in June 1997 as a Liberal during the general election of the 36th Canadian Parliament. McKay was twice elected to the former electoral district of Scarborough East, in 1997 and 2000, with 54.3 and 59.8 percent of the vote respectively. After 2000, the riding of Scarborough East was abolished and became Scarborough-Guildwood, which acquired parts of Scarborough Southwest and Scarborough Centre. McKay is as of October 30, 2015 the Member of Parliament for Scarborough-Guildwood and was elected as the representative for the riding in 2004, 2006, 2008, 2011, 2015, 2019, and 2021 with 57.5, 53.3, 50.2, 36.2, 60.0, 61, and again with 61 percent of the vote respectively.

== Parliamentary experience ==
=== Parliamentary Secretary to the Minister of Finance ===
From 2003 to 2006, McKay served as Parliamentary Secretary to then Finance Minister Ralph Goodale. Paul Martin, during his tenure as Prime Minister, implemented a number of reforms aimed at making parliament more democratic. One of these reforms gave greater authority to MPs serving as Parliamentary Secretary to a Minister, in contrast to their previous role that had been largely clerical with little purview over government policy. To this end, McKay was given ministerial responsibility for the improvement of partnerships between the public and private sectors.

During the 2003–2006 period the Ministry of Finance tabled two consecutive balanced budgets and implemented its productivity strategy, aimed at improving economic growth through innovation, elimination of domestic trade barriers, competitive taxes, and improved infrastructure among other initiatives.

=== Parliamentary Secretary to the Minister of National Defence ===
Between 2015 and 2019 McKay served as the Parliamentary Secretary to then Minister of National Defence Harjit Sajjan.

=== Critic portfolios ===
McKay served as the Critic for the Environment for the Liberal Party of Canada during the government of Steven Harper He was appointed to the role by Liberal Party Leader Justin Trudeau on August 21, 2013. His positions include:

- Liberal Party of Canada Critic for Environment – 2013–2015
- Liberal Party of Canada Critic for Defence – 2011–2013
- Official Opposition Critic for Small Business and Tourism – 2008
- Official Opposition Critic for Crown Corporations – 2006

=== Committees ===
McKay was the vice-chairman of the Standing Committee on Justice and Human Rights (2001–2003), Member of the Standing Committee of Finance (2004–2011), Chair of the Standing Committee on Government Operations (2011–2012), and vice-chair of the Standing Committee on National Defence (2011–2013). He was a member of the Standing Committee on Environment from 2013 to 2015. Currently (April 2019), he serves as Chair of the Standing Committee on Public Safety and National Security; Chair of the Canadian Section of the Canada-United States Permanent Joint Board on Defence; and vice-president of the Canada-United Kingdom Inter-Parliamentary Association, along with membership in several other groups and committees.

=== Other Parliamentary experience ===
- Vice-chair of Canada-U.S Inter-Parliamentary Association – Present
- Chair of the Liberal Caucus Committee on Economic Prosperity - 2007–2008
- Chair of the Canada-Caribbean Parliamentary Friendship Group – 2006
- Head of Canadian delegation at Commonwealth Finance Ministers Meeting - Barbados 2005, St. Kitts 2004
- Chair of the Canada-Taiwan Parliamentary Friendship Group from 2001 to 2004
- Head of Canadian delegation to Taiwan 2003

== Successful Private Members’ Bills ==
McKay has successfully sponsored two Private Members' Bills during his tenure as a Member of Parliament:

- C-260, passed in 2003, requires cigarette manufacturers to produce ‘fire-safe’ cigarettes (cigarettes that extinguish when left unattended, reducing their flammability).
- C-293, passed in 2008, outlines specific requirements for the disbursement of Canadian foreign aid. The Bill requires that Canadian foreign aid be exclusively targeted toward the goal of poverty reduction, and requires timely and transparent reporting of how such funds are spent.

Private Members' Bills rarely receive Royal Assent as most bills originate from the cabinet of the party controlling the most seats (the party in government).

=== An Act to amend the Hazardous Products Act (fire-safe cigarettes) - C-260 ===
In 2002 McKay introduced Bill C-260, an amendment to the already existing Hazardous Products Act, which forces tobacco manufacturers to produce fire safe cigarettes in response to the threat of fire posed by cigarettes left unattended. The Bill requires that cigarettes meet regulated ignition propensity standards (RIPs) by law and provide evidence to the Minister of Health of compliance with the regulation. As of October 1, 2005, all cigarettes in Canada are manufactured to self-extinguish before burning to the cigarette filter, thus reducing the risk that it will start a fire when forgotten or when the smoker falls asleep.

Prior to the C-260, the Canadian Ministry of Health estimated that unattended cigarettes resulted in 2085 fires, 70 deaths and $28.1 million in damages to property. Health Canada further estimated that RIP cigarettes would prevent 34-68% of fire loss damages.

After C-260 received Royal Assent in 2003, Canada became the first country to introduce nationwide ignition propensity regulations on cigarettes, and has become an example used by advocacy groups in other nations for the imposition of such regulations.

=== The Development Assistance Accountability Act - C-293 ===
In 2006 McKay introduced Private Members’ Bill C-293, which called for significant changes to the manner in which Canada's official development assistance is delivered and administered. Often referred to as the ‘Better Aid Bill,’ its primary purpose is to mandate that the Canadian International Development Agency (CIDA) target Canada's Official Development Assistance (ODA) to the specific goal of poverty reduction in developing nations.

Prior to the passage of C-293, parliamentary committees and NGOs had called for a clearer mandate for ODA. Critics of Canada's aid spending noted that assistance was often sent to countries that have recently experienced strong economic growth and prosperity or have dubious records regarding human rights. In an article from 19 June 2007, National Post columnist John Ivison reported that Canada had sent $7.7 million to the Republic of Ireland and Northern Ireland for job creation programs and reconciliation projects, despite the country's healthy economy, lower taxation rate and higher per capita GDP. In another example, Ivison noted that in 2004-2005 China received $57 million in ODA, amid concerns held by the international community about human rights abuses.

The Bill established a set of principles that CIDA must take into account when adjudging how aid is to be spent. First, it requires that the perspectives and concerns of those who receive ODA be taken into account. This means that Canadian aid flows will have to respect the priorities of its beneficiaries - the people living in poverty. Secondly, it requires that ODA be promulgated in a manner consistent with Canadian values and foreign policy, sustainable development, and the promotion of democracy and human rights. The Bill also requires that Canadian foreign aid spending be more transparent and accountable to Parliament and must be reported in a timely manner.

Due to the legislated focus on long-term poverty reduction, ODA cannot be redirected towards international military efforts or short-term disaster relief (areas of policy that the Canadian government must fund separately) and is subject to judicial review and oversight by the Minister.

Senator Roméo Dallaire moved third reading of C-293 in the Senate. Senator Dallaire hailed the Bill saying: "My colleague in the other place, the Honourable John McKay, introduced Bill C-293 in the House of Commons in May 2006, almost two years ago. It has come a long way since then and has been put through many valuable and essential debates. I believe the debates initiated by Bill C-293 were so important that they will inform the nature of any future essential international development policy and legislation in this country. It is a first step."

On 20 March 2008, C-293 passed third reading in the House of Commons with unanimous support from all parties. It received Royal Assent on May 29, 2008, thus becoming law as the Development Assistance Accountability Act, (An Act respecting the provision of official development assistance abroad).

Canada's Development Assistance Accountability Act represents a trend among other nations that provide foreign aid toward legislated mandates for the provision of foreign aid. In 2002 the U.K. passed the International Development Act that entrenched poverty reduction as the preponderant focus of its foreign aid. Other countries with similar legislation include Sweden, Switzerland, Spain, Luxembourg, Denmark and Belgium.

McKay is one of the more active Members of the Canadian Parliament on the issue of aid to developing nations, having been the Vice President of CIDO; an organization devoted the development of microfinancing in developing nations. In 2007 McKay travelled with Michael Savage M.P. (Liberal), Alexa McDonough M.P. (NDP), and Bill Casey M.P. (Conservative) to Kenya as part of a Parliamentary envoy to assess the efficacy and potential of ODA in developing nations. Though C-293 had been introduced prior to the trip, according to McKay the Kenyan sojourn gave greater urgency to the need for ODA reform. "We did not come away with easy answers regarding development and poverty, but a much clearer sense that we do have the capacity for meaningful change."

C-293 has received praise from a diverse array of groups and organizations including Canada's Coalition to End Global Poverty, Make Poverty History, Engineers without Borders and the Evangelical Fellowship of Canada.

== "The Responsible Mining Bill" - Private Members' Bill C-300 ==
=== Corporate Accountability of Mining, Oil and Gas Corporations in Developing Countries Act - Bill C-300 ===
On February 9, 2009, John McKay introduced his latest Private Member's Bill C- 300 to the House of Commons. The Bill was defeated on 26 October 2010, during its third reading.

Bill C- 300, also cited as the Corporate Accountability of Mining, Oil and Gas Corporations in Developing Countries Act, has the stated purpose of promoting "environmental best practices and to ensure the protection and promotion of international human rights standards in respect of the mining, oil or gas activities of Canadian corporations in developing countries". The Act would require the Minister of Foreign Affairs and the Minister of International Trade to investigate and report on any single complaint against the activities of a Canadian extractive sector company in a developing country. The Ministers could also investigate matters on their own initiative. The Ministers would publish the results of any specific investigation, and submit annual reports of activities carried out under the Act to the House of Commons and the Senate for review. The Act would also amend the laws governing Export Development Canada, the Canada Pension Plan, and the Department of Foreign Affairs and International Trade, to require those organizations to withdraw financial support and consular support from companies acting "inconsistently" with corporate social responsibility (CSR) Guidelines. McKay has stated that the intent of the bill is that these investigations be carried out within the existing organization and with the existing personnel available to the Ministers of Foreign Affairs and of International Trade.

Said McKay: "NGOs and government officials who have expressed concerns about the practices of some mining, oil, and gas operations in developing countries will be encouraged by Bill C-300. This Bill will provide strong incentives for Canadian corporations in developing countries to follow environmental and human rights standards."

However, the intended and actual scope and impact of the Bill is not clear. John McKay sometimes characterizes the bill as a modest law that would merely ensure that the Canadian government does not directly support extractive industry companies that do not adhere to CSR standards. However, it appears that the law would oblige or empower (oblige in response to a complaint, empower if they believe warranted) the Ministers to investigate and report on any Canadian mining or oil company regardless of whether it was currently receiving support – so the potential sanction of government condemnation would apply to any extractive industry company, if one of the Ministers decides it is not acting consistently with the CSR guidelines.

C-300 is not without controversy. While there has been no disagreement with the bill's stated intent in continuing to improve Canada's performance in CSR, many groups argue that the bill has flaws that would prevent it from achieving its objective. The mechanism of the bill is not aimed at changing the CSR performance of projects in developing countries, only from dissuading Canadian companies from initiating or maintaining investments in projects that may be found inconsistent with the CSR Guidelines. John McKay has used Talisman Energy divesting of its share of a venture in Sudan as an example of how it would be feasible for Canadian companies to comply with the bill. While this did eliminate Talisman's exposure to the poor CSR performance of that venture, there is evidence that this actually reduced CSR performance in Sudan by eliminating Talisman's advocacy for CSR measures. This approach contrasts to the National Roundtables on CSR 2007 Advisory Group's recommendations, and the current government initiatives, that are aimed at supporting and enforcing improved performance in the developing world.

Export Development Canada (EDC) would be required to withdraw even existing financing from a company that has been found in a Ministerial investigation to have activities inconsistent with the guidelines to be established under Bill C-300. EDC notes that they currently conduct CRS assessments of financings in sensitive markets or for sensitive projects, and work with companies to ensure that required standards are met before receiving EDC support. EDC believes that by working with companies to resolve CSR issues they contribute more to CSR than if they were forced to exit the relationship as soon as the guidelines are not met. EDC's support in this sector helped generate $21.4 billion in Canadian GDP and sustain 139,000 Canadian jobs in communities across the country and this might be in jeopardy if Bill C-300 were to become law.

Representatives of the mining industry also note that key stakeholders were not consulted in the development of the bill, and is not in keeping with the spirit and intent of the recommendations of the National Roundtable on CSR. Representatives of the legal community in Canada and the extractive industry have noted that C-300 is problematic in several ways, including Canada's capacity, expertise or jurisdiction to enforce CSR guidelines abroad or to supersede local authorities. It also forces the Canadian government into a punitive approach, rather than allowing the government to assist companies is resolving CSR issues.

As is evidenced through public statements and media appearances, Bill C-300's critics represent a wide array of extractive industry and business interests. However, Bill C-300 is also supported by a wide array of public academics, and NGOs both internationally and within Canada. Supporters of the Bill include (but are not limited to): Amnesty International, the Halifax Initiative, Make Poverty History, MiningWatch Canada, Africa Files, World Vision, The North-South Institute, Canadian Labour Congress, Development and Peace (Canada), Ecojustice Canada, Rights and Democracy, Social Justice Committee of Montreal, and Canadian Network on Corporate Accountability. Various private individuals and foreign governments have weighed-in both as supporters and as critics of the Bill.

Professor Richard Janda of the McGill University Faculty of Law produced a report entitled, Bill C-300: Sound and Measured Reinforcement for CSR. According to Professor Janda Bill C-300 would make Canadian companies world leaders in CSR, and that good CSR performance would give Canadian extractive companies a competitive edge and international business advantage. Industry submissions agree that good CSR performance is generally a source of competitive advantage. Professor Janda's report does not examine the current position of Canadian companies and CSR, nor does it examine whether C-300 is required in order to make Canadian companies world leaders, both which are beyond the scope of the report. However, John McKay has stated that Canadian companies already have a competitive advantage in some developing countries because they are held to higher standards of practice and more likely to fulfill licensing conditions. Essentially, there is agreement that CSR is important, and that Canada is already in many ways a strong player - the debate is whether C-300 will improve CSR performance, and if so whether it is the most appropriate way to do so.

An important difference between the basis of Professor Janda's conclusions and the concerns of industry is the presumption of how easy, or not, it will be for the Minister receiving a complaint to determine if it is "frivolous or vexatious". Professor Janda states that "the general requirement that a complaint appear to be reasonable on its face is nevertheless sufficiently stringent to allow the Minister in question efficiently to screen out complaints that are frivolous and vexatious", whereas industry representatives state that this will not be an easy determination, given that the complaints will likely relate to activities in remote areas and particularly if the complaint comes from an individual outside of Canada (in a developing country).

A second important difference in the view of the Janda report and submissions from industry and other members of the legal community is the presumption of how complaints will be investigated. Professor Janda refers to the legality in Canada for the Canadian government to hear evidence from "witnesses abroad", and gives examples of foreign fact-finding related to assistance in natural disasters to coordinate relief efforts. However, he does not address the practicality or legality of investigating matters related to breaches of laws in foreign countries, which may include investigation of the actions of the foreign government. Submissions critical of C-300 point out that many of the various allegations made against Canadian companies also imply breaches of law in the host country, or include accusations against the police or military of the host country, or challenge the conformity of host country laws with international standards (such as for recognition of indigenous peoples) - and that these would likely be difficult to investigate from Canada, or for the Canadian government to investigate in the host country.

The Janda report also finds Bill C-300 is consistent with the National Roundtables Advisory Group's recommendations, with an even more modest set of proposals. However, this is based on examination of the 6 "major components" of the proposed Canadian CSR Framework, which is a central recommendation in the Advisory Group report, rather than the 26 specific recommendations contained in the Advisory Group report. In fact, the Bill does not reflect any of the specific recommendations of the Roundtables, although it is frequently referenced to the Ombudsman called for in the Roundtable recommendations. Supporters of C-300 state that the Bill is a better representation of the Ombudsman than the recently created Office of the Extractive Sector CSR Counsellor, because C-300 can force investigations and impose sanctions. However, the Ombudsman office described in the recommendations was not to have the power to impose sanctions, it was proposed to "provide advisory, fact-finding and reporting functions". A separate "standing tripartite Compliance Review Committee" (presumably representing government, business, and civil society) was proposed that, in cases of serious non-compliance, would make recommendations with regard to the "withdrawal of financial and/or nonfinancial services" by the government.

The Janda report rebuts further criticism by claiming Bill C-300's direct effects to be within federal jurisdiction, and therefore, not extraterritorial. However, this opinion does not address the legitimacy of the Canadian government investigating allegations related to the activities of foreign governments, nor investigation of crimes (other than "crimes of universal jurisdiction") occurring in foreign countries, nor investigation of the activities of foreign nationals working in their home country. As noted above, critics of the bill point out that allegations that have been presented as justification for the bill would require these sorts of extraterritorial investigations. The Janda report insists that Bill C-300's expectations on Canadian corporations have a strong legal foundation.

Bill C-300 supporters claim that since the mining companies receive investment from Export Development Canada (EDC), which is funded by Canadian taxpayers, and Canadian Pension Plan (CPP) their actions ought to be transparent and accountable to Canadians. The submissions critical of C-300 do not argue against this principle, and have noted that the existing CSR Commitment of EDC, and CPP Policies and Reports on Responsible Investing currently provide at least a measure of such transparency and accountability. Additionally, C-300 does not include any of the transparency measures included in the recommendations of the National Roundtables 2007 Advisory Group report - many of which would not require government expenditure and therefore would be suitable for a Private Member's Bill.

Read the full text of the Bill here:

== "The Sunshine Bill" – Bill C-474 ==
On February 26, 2013, McKay tabled Bill C-474, or "The Sunshine Bill," borrowing from former U.S. Supreme Court Justice Louis Bradeis’ famous phrase on transparency, 'sunlight is said to be the best of disinfectants.'

Responding to allegations of corrupt corporate payments made to foreign entities, the bill would have required Canadian extractive sector companies to submit an audited, annual transparency report to the Government of Canada disclosing all payments to foreign governments. The bill would also have given the Government of Canada the power to conduct investigations of payments to foreign governments, as well as levy a fine of up to $5 million and allow for complaints to be tried in a court with jurisdiction over the company.

According to McKay, "the Sunshine Bill" was modelled on the United States’ Cardin-Lugar amendment (2016) to the Dodd-Frank Wall Street Reform & Consumer Protection Act that required oil, gas, and mining companies to disclose payments to foreign governments or potentially be de-listed from U.S. stock exchanges.

As noted by CNBC: "The goal is to prevent foreign leaders from skimming off the payments that drillers and miners make to their countries. Such corruption, which enriches the politically connected but deprives regular people of their country’s mineral wealth, is known as the ‘resource curse.’"

Said McKay in the House of Commons on May 24, 2013: "This is serious stuff. The common pattern is the conviction gets registered, the officials get fired, the stock gets hammered, so there is a bunch of unhappy people and the most unhappy of all are the shareholders. All of us are shareholders in many of these companies because they are all on the TSX and our Canada pension plan has large holdings on many of these companies."

He continued in a speech on January 31, 2014: "The best companies operate at the highest ethical standards, but they are frankly helpless when less ethical companies bribe their way into lucrative concessions… (i)t frustrates the CEOs who want to do the right thing. It makes him or her unnecessarily vulnerable and, frankly, it trashes Canada's reputation."

While McKay’s "Sunshine Bill" was defeated by the Conservatives under Prime Minister Stephen Harper on April 9, 2014, the Harper government later adopted a similar measure in C-43, the omnibus budget implementation act, introduced on October 23, 2014 as the Extractive Sector Transparency Measures Act.

The Extractive Sector Transparency Measures Act requires, oil, gas, and mining companies to disclose payments to foreign entities. Penalties for offenses under the Act include fines and the potential for summary conviction.

== "The Modern Slavery Act" – Bill C-423 ==
=== Ending the Use of All Forms of Child Labour in Supply Chains – Report of the Standing Committee on Foreign Affairs and International Development ===
In October of 2018 McKay participated in the House of Commons Subcommittee on International Human Rights study on child labour and modern slavery that resulted in A Call to Action: Ending the Use of All Forms of Child Labour in Supply Chains. The Committee released a set of recommendations for the Government of Canada on how to reduce child labour in supply chains.

The Committee concludes the report by calling on the Government of Canada to take action against the use of child and forced labour in supply chains, arguing that taking concerted international action to implement the recommendations of the subcommittee is the best way to achieve the ultimate goal of eliminating all forms of child labour worldwide. As a result of the report, the Government of Canada began to explore legislation to stop child and forced labour in supply chains.

=== Bill C-423 ===
Bill C-423, or The Modern Slavery Act, was introduced by McKay in December 2018 following the committee report released in October saying "(t)his bill gives an opportunity for consumers to know whether, in fact, anywhere along the supply chain of the product they are buying or the service they are using, slave or forced labour conditions applied."

The purpose of the Modern Slavery Act is to implement Canada's international commitment to confirm supply chain transparency and contribute to the fight against modern slavery. The Act requires companies that have assets over CAD $20 million and revenue over CAD $40 million to ensure that their supply chains are transparent and free of goods produced by slavery if they wish to do business in Canada. If passed, the Minister of Public Safety and Emergency Preparedness through the Canadian Border Services Agency could impose an import ban on goods or materials partially or fully produced by forced labour. Entities found to have imported tainted goods can be subjected to a fine of up to CAD $250,000. This is in addition to the reputational damages, which often far exceeds the costs of fines or import bans. However, Bill C-423 did not proceed in the House of Commons due to the 2019 Federal Election.

=== All Party Parliamentary Group to End Modern Slavery ===
Following the 2019 Federal Election, McKay continued his work on modern slavery legislation with the All-Party Parliamentary Group to End Modern Slavery as a co-chair. Senator Julie Miville-Deschene, a co-chair of the APPG, introduced S-216 into the Senate in February 2020. S-216 was initially introduced into the House of Commons as McKay's Private Members Bill C-423.

During the 2021 Federal Election, the Liberal and Conservative Parties of Canada outlined platform commitments for supply chain legislation to end modern slavery in Canadian supply chains. The APPG is expected to introduce a third version of the bill once the 44th parliament resumes.

== Conservation efforts ==
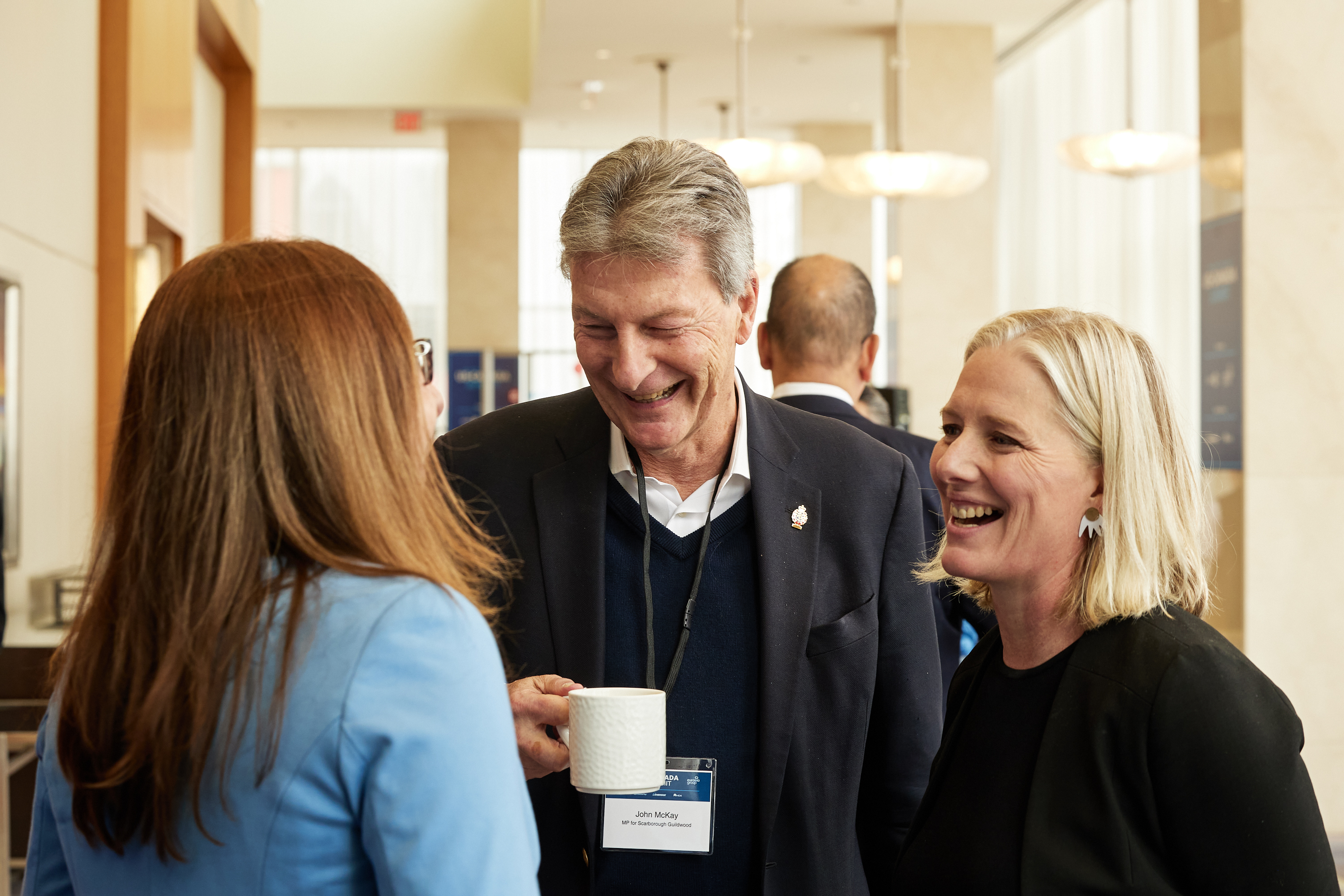
McKay with Katharine Hayhoe and Catherine McKenna in 2023

From 1998 to 2000, McKay represented the Federal Government as a board member on the Rouge Park Alliance, a group of government representatives and community leaders dedicated to the conservation, ecological protection, and enhancement of the Rouge River watershed and lakefront areas (The former riding of Scarborough East bordered on the Rouge River area). McKay has also helped with efforts to extend the Waterfront Trail along parts of the Scarborough shoreline and enhance its public accessibility.

== Miscellaneous ==
McKay is a leading social conservative in the Liberal Party. He strongly opposed his own party's bill which legalised same-sex marriage in Canada in 2005. McKay is a past board member of the Doris McCarthy Gallery at the University of Toronto Scarborough campus.
