= Zochrot =

Israeli nonprofit organization

- Founded: 2002
- Founder: Eitan Bronstein
- Location: Tel Aviv, Israel
- Revenue: 280,000 euros in 2006
- Website: www.zochrot.org/welcome/index/en

Zochrot (Hebrew: זוכרות; "Remembering"; Arabic: ذاكرات; "Memories") is an Israeli nonprofit organization founded in 2002. Based in Tel Aviv, its aim is to promote awareness of the Nakba, including the 1948 Palestinian expulsion and flight. The group was co-founded by Eitan Bronstein and Norma Musih, and its current director is Maya Yavin. Its slogan is "From Nakba to Return".

Zochrot organizes tours of Israeli towns, which include taking displaced Palestinians back to the areas they fled or were expelled from in 1948 and afterwards. The group erects street signs giving the Palestinian history of the street or area they are in. Zochrot sees this as causing "disorder in space", raising questions about naming and belonging. A key aim is to "Hebraize the Nakba" by creating a space for it in the public discourse of Israeli Jews.

The word "Zochrot" uses the feminine plural present tense form of the Hebrew verb "to remember", whereas it is customary in Hebrew to use the masculine plural form when referring to a group of people. The feminine form was chosen to signal Zochrot's approach toward the Nakba, which the group says challenges what it sees as the masculine historical narrative by focusing on compassion and inclusion.

== Publications ==
The magazine of the group bears the name Sedek (English: rupture/rift) and was published for the fourth time in spring 2010. This issue contains more than 40 poems by Israeli poets, which were published in the period between 1948 and 1958. The poems reflect the views of the authors on the displacement of the Palestinians in the years around the foundation of Israel.

In 2012, Zochrot and Pardes Publications published a guidebook Omrim Yeshna Eretz ("Once Upon a Land – a Tour Guide") in Arabic and Hebrew, which is "designed to educate Jewish-Israelis about how their towns and cities were founded in an effort to reconcile them with the original inhabitants of the land". It provides tours of 18 localities, mostly the sites of Palestinian villages depopulated in 1948. While Zochrot translates the title "Omrim Yeshna Eretz" into English as "Once Upon a Land", a more literal translation would be "They Say There Is a Land". "Omrin Yeshna Eretz" is a popular song and Israeli folk dance based on a poem by Shaul Tchernichovsky first published in a 1929 collection.

== Funding ==
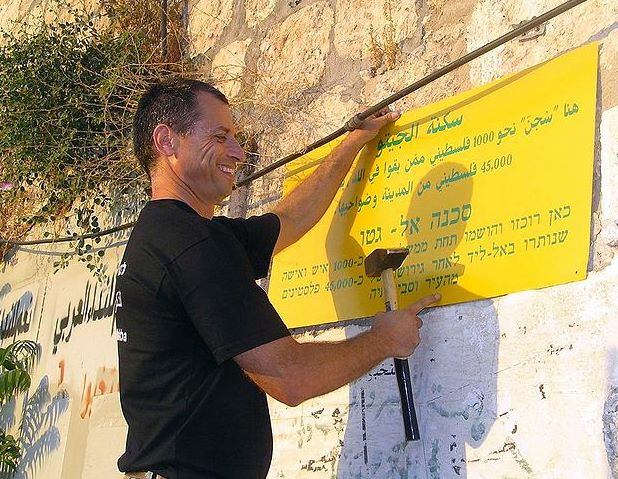
Eitan Bronstein, co-founder of Zochrot, posts a sign in Hebrew and Arabic on the former Arab "ghetto" in Lod (Lydda), 2003.

According to its 2010 annual report, Zochrot listed the following groups as contributors: EKS-EPER, Trócaire, CCFD, Broederlijk Delen, MISEREOR, ICCO-KerkinActie, Oxfam GM, Oxfam Solidarity, Mennonite Central Committee, Medico International. The group did not list its annual income. In its 2006 annual report, the group declared a total income of 280,000 euros and listed the Mennonite Central Committee, Kerkinactie, ICCO, Cimade, CCFD, EPER/HEKS, Broederlijk Delen, Oxfam Solidarity Belgium, Misereor, Medico International, and Zivik as contributors. In its 2022 report, Zochrot listed Misereor, HEKS-EPER, IHL Trust, Kurve Wustruw, the Euro-Mediterranean Foundation of Support to Human Rights Defenders, and the Rockefeller Brothers Foundation as funders.

In 2012, the German federal organization Foundation Remembrance, Responsibility and Future (commonly referred to by its German acronym, EVZ), which provides financial compensation to victims of forced labor and other Nazi atrocities during the Holocaust, announced that they would no longer support Zochrot due to its support for the Palestinian right of return.

== iReturn (formerly iNakba) ==
In 2014, Zochrot launched iNakba, a mobile app that uses GPS technology to allow users to locate and learn about Palestinian villages that were destroyed during and after the Nakba. The app is now called iReturn, and aims to "use technology to re-tell a suppressed history and to reveal Israel’s hidden landscape of ethnic cleansing and forced expulsions."

== See also ==
- 1948 Palestinian expulsion from Lydda and Ramle
- Nakba Day
