= Burn Hall School =

Location
- Gupkar Road, Sonwar; Srinagar; Jammu and Kashmir; India; 34.074195°N 74.832928°E

Information
- Type: Missionary
- Motto: Latin: Industria Floremus “In Toil We Flourish”
- Established: April 17, 1956; 70 years ago (originally in 1942; 84 years ago)
- Founder: Father J. Boerkamp (Saint Joseph's Missionary Society of Mill Hill, London)
- Sister school: Army Burn Hall College in Abbottabad, Pakistan
- Principal: Rev. Fr. Stalin Raja
- Classes offered: L.K.G to 12th
- Language: English
- Campus: Urban
- Houses: Shakespeare; Wordsworth; Keats; Milton
- Color: Navy blue
- Nickname: "Hallions"
- Publication: Burn Hall Flame
- Yearbook: Burn Hall Blaze
- Affiliation: JKBOSE
- Website: www.burnhallschool.ac.in

Burn Hall School is an all boys missionary school in Srinagar, Jammu and Kashmir, India. Its motto is "Industria Floremus - In Toil We Flourish". It is one of the oldest schools in the valley. The school celebrated its Diamond Jubilee in 2016, and it's Platinum Jubilee on 17 April 2026.

== History ==
The Mill Hill Missionaries (MHM) first settled in the Kashmir area in 1884 to provide pastoral care to Catholic soldiers and began establishing a formal mission, including the construction of oldest Catholic Church in Jammu and Kashmir at Baramulla in 1891. On 6th July, 1887, Pope Leo XIII erected the Apostolic Prefecture of Kashmir and Kafirstan, whose territories extended from Kashmir to Kabul, and entrusted it to the Mill Hill Missionaries. It were eventually the Mill Hill missionaries Fr. Thijssen and Fr. Jong who started this boys' school in Srinagar in 1942. "The Willows" building which housed the first Burn Hall School is now the Teachers' Training College.

The Srinagar branch closed down temporarily following the Pakistani invasion that occurred during the Indo-Pakistani War of 1947–1948, and it was restarted on 17 April 1976 with its first principal, Father J. Boerkamp.

For reconstruction of the school premises, after a fire gutted down the building on March 27, 1976, Misereor and Dutch Lenten Campaign Foundation (Formerly Cebemo) had majorly helped with aid for new operations.

== Location ==
Burn Hall School is located in Sonwar, Srinagar. It is neighboured by Ziarat Sharief of Syed Yaqoob Sahib, and Sher-i-Kashmir Stadium.

== Administration ==
Burn Hall School is managed by the Roman Catholic Diocese of Jammu–Srinagar. It is directed by the Education Society of the Jammu-Srinagar Diocese. The school serves children from age 3 years through secondary school.

== Social status ==
According to Greater Kashmir, in 2015 District Development Commissioner Farooq Ahmed Shah praised Burn Hall for "spreading quality education". Kashmir Observer said it is "a prestigious institution in the city, with one of the oldest schooling traditions".

== Affiliations ==
Registered as a charitable society, it is affiliated with Jammu and Kashmir State Board of School Education (JKBOSE) and recognized by the Education Department of the Government of Jammu and Kashmir. It follows the directions from the Directorate of School Education, Srinagar.

== Public empowerment liability ==
The school's lease agreement on government land requires the school to hold places to admit students from the low economic sector of society.

== Curriculum ==
Burn Hall School follows curriculum of the JKBOSE, and as an English medium school, it places special emphasis on usage of English language in student-teacher and student-student interaction. Extra-curricular cultural and literary activities, as well as environment and science activities, provide experiential learning opportunities.

== The BHS Students' Council ==
In 2022, the school, the 1st Students' Council, headed by the Head Boy & his Deputy.

In 2023, the 2nd Students' Council was appointed.

Subsequently, the 3rd Students' Council was appointed on 9 May 2024. In an effort to encourage students' leadership qualities, the school increased the council's total capacity from 15 to 37 and later 40.

The school appointed the 4th Students' Council in the academic session of 2025.

== The BHS Editorial Board ==
The school operates a 'Student run" editorial team for the management and publishing of its Yearbook "The Burn Hall Blaze" and the monthly newsletter "The Burn Hall Flame."

== Notable alumni ==
- Omar Abdullah, Chief minister of J&K, vice-president Jammu & Kashmir National Conference, 1st chief minister of the Union Territory of Jammu & Kashmir
- Agha Shahid Ali, English poet
- Rohit Bal, fashion designer
- Haseeb Drabu, economist, politician
- Zain Khan Durrani, bollywood actor
- Mirwaiz Umar Farooq, politician, chief Islamic cleric of Kashmir.
- MC Kash, rap/hip hop artist
- Autar Kaw, academic
- Ahmer Khan, independent journalist
- Amjad Khan, cricketer
- Kunal Khemu, bollywood actor
- Sajjad Gani Lone, politician, MLA Handwara JKLA.
- Amitabh Mattoo, educationist, policymaker
- Junaid Azim Mattu, politician, former mayor Srinagar Municipal Corporation
- Vikram Misri, former Indian diplomat to Spain, Myanmar and China
- Shafat Qazi, IT entrepreneur
- Tanvir Sadiq, politician, chief spokesperson Jammu & Kashmir National Conference, MLA Zadibal JKLA
- Sanjay Suri, bollywood actor

== Former principals ==
- 1956–1962: Fr. Boerkamp MHM
- 1963–1964: Fr. Kuipers MHM
- 1964–1967: Fr. J. Mc Mohan MHM
- 1968–1977: Fr. J. Jones MHM
- 1977–1983: Fr. J.C. Hugh OFM Cap.
- 1984–1989: Fr. Dominic OFM Cap.
- 1990–1992: Br. V. J. Mani SG
- 1992–1993: Br. Raju John SG
- 1993–1997: Br. Jacob SG
- 1997–2001: Br. George SG
- 2001–2007: Fr. Maria John
- 2007–2012: Fr. Raphael Jey Kumar
- 2012–2014: Fr. Ivan Pereira
- 2015–3 Nov 2021: Fr. Sebastian Nagathunkal
- 3 Nov 2021–present: Fr. Stalin Raja

== See also ==
- List of schools in India
- List of Christian Schools in India
