= Kairos Canada =

Canadian faith-based ecumenical organization

KAIROS: Canadian Ecumenical Justice Initiatives is a Canadian faith-based ecumenical organization with an aim to effect social change through advocacy, education and research programs in indigenous rights, ecological justice, women of courage, and migrant justice. These programs are informed by, and networked with, approximately 21 partner organisations in Africa, Asia, Latin America, and the Middle East, in about eighty local grassroots groups across Canada, as well as other organizations, churches and individuals.

== Member churches and memberships ==
On July 1, 2001, KAIROS brought together the work of ten previous national ecumenical coalitions whose work ranged geographically from the Americas (including Canada) to Asia, Africa and the Middle East; thematically from human rights to economic justice, ecology, and aboriginal rights; and in practice from research to education and advocacy.

The KAIROS national Board is made up of representatives from its member churches and religious organizations:

- Anglican Church of Canada
- Christian Reformed Church in North America
- Evangelical Lutheran Church in Canada
- Presbyterian Church in Canada
- United Church of Canada
- Religious Society of Friends
- Development and Peace
- Canadian Religious Conference
- Mennonite Central Committee of Canada
- Alongside Hope (formerly the Primate's World Relief and Development Fund)

KAIROS is also a member of the Halifax Initiative, a coalition of Canadian non-governmental organizations for public interest work and education on international financial institutions, as is Cooperation Canada, MiningWatch Canada, and many others.

== KAIROS Program ==
KAIROS' primary occupation is to help people to change current structures that allow human rights abuses and environmental degradation to occur. As such it supports positive structural transformation at a grassroots level, rather than providing humanitarian aid.

KAIROS closely partners with small NGOs in a variety of Countries of Concern (particularly Colombia, DR Congo, Palestine/Israel, South Sudan and the Philippines, building up long-term relationships, to carry out its programs.

Since 2011 KAIROS has increased its focus on Indigenous Rights in Canada, starting with its 2011–12 Campaign on 'Truth, Reconciliation & Equity': working towards the realization of the United Nations Declaration on the Rights of Indigenous Peoples (UNDRIP) in Canada. It has been actively promoting and educating on the 'Free, Prior and Informed Consent' (FPIC) provision of the UNDRIP (with specific focus on Resource Extraction issues), strongly supported the 'Idle No More' movement in Canada, and explicitly engaged in the mandate of the Truth and Reconciliation Commission of Canada to witness and support those impacted by the Residential School system.

KAIROS' 'Women of Courage' program, which seeks to increase the capacity of women and women's organizations in their work against militarization and for human rights, engages in 'Living Courage Tours' bringing partners from Colombia, Congo, Israel/Palestine, Philippines, and Sudan to help Canadians understand and respond to these issues.

In 1997 KAIROS created the blanket exercise, an interactive teaching tool illustrating the history of indigenous peoples in Canada.

== Defunding by the Canadian International Development Agency ==
On November 30, 2009, the Canadian International Development Agency (CIDA) informed KAIROS that its $7 million 2009-2013 program proposal had been rejected.

On December 16, 2009, Jason Kenney, Canada's Minister of Citizenship, Immigration and Multiculturalism, spoke at the Global Forum for Combating Anti-Semitism in Jerusalem. As an example of its fight against anti-Semitism, he said his government had "defunded organizations … like KAIROS for taking a leadership role in the boycott, divestment and sanctions campaign" against Israel. KAIROS' executive director said Kenney's statement was based on incorrect information and described "label[ling] someone anti-Semitic because they criticize a government" as "outrageous".

KAIROS and its allies sought to rebut this criticism—according to the organisation's press release claimed that the government's decision led to criticism from all of Canada's mainstream churches, dozens of civil rights and development organizations (including a direct letter from Archbishop Desmond Tutu), all of the federal opposition parties, as well as intense media scrutiny. In response, International Cooperation Minister Bev Oda explained that KAIROS no longer fit in with CIDA's priorities. Prime Minister Stephen Harper supported Oda's decision.

=== Minister Oda's "NOT" ===
In December 2010 "documents emerged showing that CIDA’s senior civil servants, including the agency’s president, Margaret Biggs, had recommended a new grant for Kairos, but the word "not" was inserted after they signed it – changing it to a rejection". Minister Oda's handling of the document involved in KAIROS' defunding led to her being severely rebuked by the Speaker of the House of Commons and to subsequent formal accusation of contempt for misleading the Commons. The national election of May 2011 precluded the outcome of that accusation.

=== Restructuring ===
On November 4, 2022 Kairos announced that it would be restructuring KAIROS Canada will become a stand-alone organization with its own charitable status. The plan is for the process to be complete by the end of 2024.
