= Our Savior Lutheran Church =

Our Savior Lutheran Church or Our Savior's Lutheran Church may refer to:

in Canada

- Our Saviour's Lutheran Church (Prince George, British Columbia)

in the United States

- Our Savior’s Kvindherred Lutheran Church (Calamus, Iowa), listed on the National Register of Historic Places (NRHP)
- Our Savior Lutheran Church (Indianapolis), Indiana, NRHP-listed
- Our Savior's Lutheran Church (Osage, Iowa), NRHP-listed
- Our Saviour's Evangelical Lutheran Church, Manistee, Michigan, NRHP-listed
- Our Saviour's Atonement Lutheran Church, Manhattan, New York, New York
- Our Savior's Scandinavian Lutheran Church, Coulee, North Dakota, NRHP-listed
- Our Savior's Lutheran Church (Menno, South Dakota), NRHP-listed
- Our Savior's Lutheran Church (Cranfills Gap, Texas)
