= CIDSE =

Umbrella organization for Catholic development agencies

Coopération Internationale pour le Développement et la Solidarité
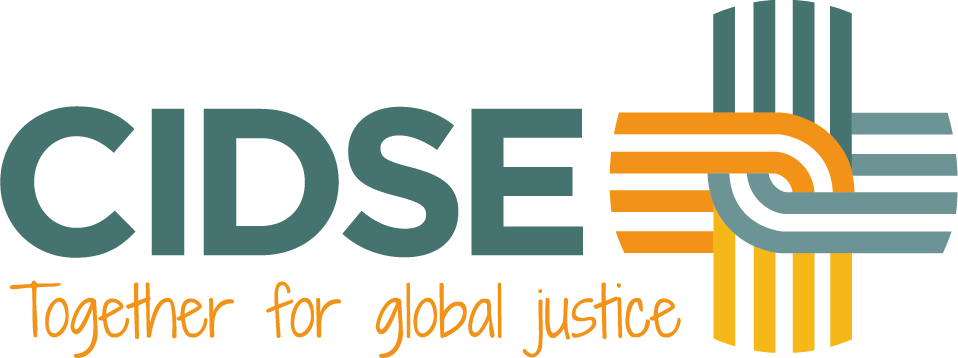
- Abbreviation: CIDSE
- Formation: November 18, 1965; 60 years ago
- Type: INGO
- Purpose: International umbrella organization or Catholic development agencies
- Headquarters: Brussels, Belgium
- Members: 18 member organisations
- Secretary General: Josianne Gauthier
- President: Caoimhe de Barra
- Website: www.cidse.org

CIDSE, which is short for "Coopération Internationale pour le Développement et la Solidarité" (French for "International Cooperation for Development and Solidarity"), is an international family of Catholic social justice organisations from Europe and North America. Its international secretariat is based in Brussels.

== History ==
CIDSE was founded, in 1965, to coordinate tasks identified by the Second Vatican Council as important tasks for the Catholic Church, namely, to care for the poor and the oppressed and to work for more justice on a global level. Since 2008, CIDSE has been expanding its approach to global justice. The 2010-2015 Strategic Framework supported a process of 'paradigm shift' with which CIDSE embarked on new work streams in a dialogue with several partners and allies to rethink development, critique systemic failures in the economy and society and look at alternatives to promote. In the 2016-2021 Strategic Framework, CIDSE redefined itself in this framework as an international family of Catholic social justice organisations working for transformational change to end poverty and inequalities, challenging systemic injustice, inequity, destruction of nature and promoting just and environmentally sustainable alternatives.

== Areas of work ==
The CIDSE Secretariat ensures communication between the CIDSE member organisations and the overall coherence of CIDSE's work by facilitating working groups, platforms and fora on the issues defined in the strategic plan. The CIDSE secretariat represents CIDSE at the EU and UN level, undertakes advocacy activities and other initiatives in collaboration with members. CIDSE is registered in the European Transparency Register. CIDSE also has general status on the UN Economic and Social Council.

The Secretariat is organised into teams that coordinate various working groups in order to achieve its objectives:

1. Societal and ecological transformation;
2. Communities regaining control over the commons;
3. Facing climate change: just and sustainable food and energy models;
4. Change starts with us.

Apart from the themes of the working groups, CIDSE manages an international campaign for sustainable lifestyles titles Change for the Planet - Care for the People. The campaign encourages living simply by reducing overall energy consumption and making sustainable food choices in order for individuals to minimize their environmental impact, allow producers to gain fair livelihoods, and respect human rights.

== Principles ==
The work of CIDSE is motivated by:

- the second encyclical of Pope Francis titled Laudato si',
- the Gospel and the Christian social teaching,
- the vocation and mission of the laity in the Church and the World,
- the dialogue with other religions and
- the Sign of the times.

== Membership ==
CIDSE currently has 18 member organisations from Europe and North America. CIDSE also works within a varied group of broader coalitions and alliances such as Climate Action Network, CONCORD and the European Laudato Si Alliance.

Country	Name
Belgium	Broederlijk Delen
England / Wales	CAFOD
France	CCFD - Terre Solidaire
USA	Maryknoll Office for Global Concerns
Netherlands	Cordaid
Canada	Development & Peace
Belgium	Entraide et Fraternité
Slovakia	eRko
Switzerland	Fastenaktion/Action de Carême (formerly Fastenopfer)
Portugal	Fundação Fé e Cooperação (FEC)
Italy	FOCSIV
Luxembourg	Partage.lu (formerly Fondation Bridderlech Deelen)
Austria	Österreichische Bischofskonferenz (KOO)
Spain	Manos Unidas
Germany	Misereor
Scotland	SCIAF
Ireland	Trócaire
Netherlands	Vastenactie
