= Development and Peace =

Development and Peace may refer to:

- Development and Peace (Canada), the official international development arm of the Catholic Church in Canada
- Development and Peace (political party), a former right-wing one-man political party in Israel
