= Official Development Assistance Accountability Act =

Canadian federal statute

House of Commons of Canada
- Long title: An Act respecting the provision of official development assistance abroad
- Citation: S.C. 2008, c. 17
- Considered by: House of Commons of Canada
- Considered by: Senate of Canada
- Assented to: May 29, 2008

Legislative history

Initiating chamber: House of Commons of Canada
- Bill citation: Bill C-293
- Introduced by: John McKay MP
- First reading: October 16, 2007

Revising chamber: Senate of Canada
- Member(s) in charge: Roméo Antonius Dallaire
- First reading: October 17, 2007
- Second reading: December 12, 2007
- Third reading: April 16, 2008
- Status: Current legislation

The Official Development Assistance Accountability Act (French: Loi sur la responsabilité en matière d’aide au développement officielle) is Canadian federal legislation that governs how development aid given to foreign countries is delivered and administered. The bill was introduced as C-293, a Private Member's Bill by Liberal MP John McKay which called for significant changes to the manner in which Canada’s official development assistance is delivered and administered.

Often referred to as the "Better Aid Bill," its primary purpose is to mandate that the Canadian International Development Agency (CIDA) target Canada’s Official Development Assistance (ODA) to the specific goal of poverty reduction in developing nations.

Prior to the passage of C-293, parliamentary committees and NGOs had called for a clearer mandate for ODA. Critics of Canada’s aid spending noted that assistance was often sent to countries that had recently experienced strong economic growth and prosperity or had dubious records regarding human rights. In an article from June 19, 2007, the National Post reported that Canada had sent $7.7 million to the Republic of Ireland and Northern Ireland for job creation programs and reconciliation projects, despite the country’s healthy economy, lower taxation rate and higher per capita GDP. In another example, Ivison noted that in 2004-2005 China received $57 million in ODA, amid concerns held by the international community about human rights abuses.

The Bill established a set of principles that CIDA must take into account when judging how aid is to be spent. First, it requires that the perspectives and concerns of those who receive ODA be taken into account. This means that Canadian aid flows will have to respect the priorities of its beneficiaries - the people living in poverty. Secondly, it requires that ODA be promulgated in a manner consistent with Canadian values and foreign policy, sustainable development, and the promotion of democracy and human rights. The Bill also requires that Canadian foreign aid spending be more transparent and accountable to Parliament and must be reported in a timely manner. Due to the legislated focus on long-term poverty reduction, ODA cannot be redirected towards international military efforts or short-term disaster relief (areas of policy that the Canadian government must fund separately) and is subject to judicial review and oversight by the Minister.

The Honourable Romeo Dallaire moved third reading of C-293 in the Senate. Senator Dallaire hailed the Bill saying: "My colleague in the other place, the Honourable John McKay, introduced Bill C-293 in the House of Commons in May 2006, almost two years ago. It has come a long way since then and has been put through many valuable and essential debates. I believe the debates initiated by Bill C-293 were so important that they will inform the nature of any future essential international development policy and legislation in this country. It is a first step." On March 20, 2008, C-293 passed third reading in the House of Commons with unanimous support from all parties. It received Royal Assent on May 29, 2008.

The Act represents a trend among other nations that provide foreign aid toward legislated mandates for the provision of foreign aid. In 2002 the U.K. passed the International Development Act that entrenched poverty reduction as the preponderant focus of its foreign aid. Other countries with similar legislation include Sweden, Switzerland, Spain, Luxembourg, Denmark and Belgium.

The Act has received praise from a diverse array of groups and organizations including Canada's Coalition to End Global Poverty, Make Poverty History, Engineers without Borders and the Evangelical Fellowship of Canada.
