= Medicus Mundi International =

Health co-operation network

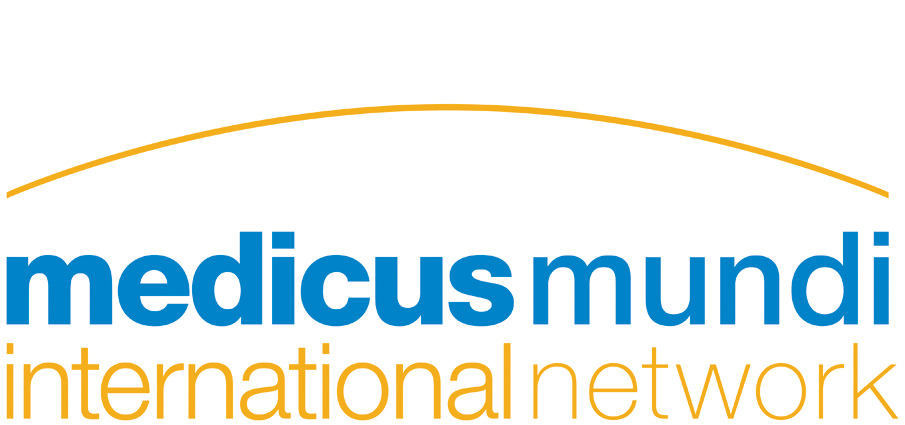
- Type: NGO Network
- Location: Basel, Switzerland
- Members: 20 NGOs
- Key people: Carlos Mediano (President), Thomas Schwarz (Executive Secretary)
- Website: www.medicusmundi.org

Medicus Mundi International (MMI) is a Network of public interest organisations working in the field of international health cooperation and advocacy. The Network members fight global poverty by promoting access to health and health care as a fundamental human right (“Health for All”). The Network aims at enhancing the quality and effectiveness of the work of its members and their partners through sharing know-how and joining forces. Key fields of joint activity include global health policy and governance (MMI is an organization in official relations with the World Health Organization) and the improvement of legitimacy, relevance and effectiveness of international health cooperation.

== Network Members ==
The MMI Network has the following member organisations:

- Africa Christian Health Associations Platform, ACHAP, Kenya
- action medeor, Germany
- AMCES, Benin
- Community Working Group on Health, Zimbabwe
- Cordaid, The Netherlands
- Doctors with Africa CUAMM, Italy
- Ecumenical Pharmaceutical Network EPN, Kenya
- Emergenza Sorrisi, Italy
- Escuela Andaluza de Salud Pública EASP, Spain
- Health Poverty Action, United Kingdom
- Institute of Tropical Medicine Antwerp, Belgium
- i+solutions, The Netherlands
- Medico international, Germany
- Medics without Vacation, Belgium
- Medicus Mundi Italy
- Medicus Mundi Switzerland, Network Health for All
- Medicus Mundi Spain
- Memisa, Belgium
- plan:g – partnership for global health, Austria
- Redemptoris Missio, Medicus Mundi Poland
- Wemos Foundation, The Netherlands

== MMI ePlatform ==
- Medicus Mundi International Network
