= Blanket exercise =

Exercise teaching indigenous history

KAIROS blanket exercise introductory video from 2016

The blanket exercise is an interactive educational program that teaches the history of colonization in Canada. The program was created in response to the 1996 report of the Royal Commission on Aboriginal Peoples, and is used as a teaching tool across Canada.

== History ==
The 1996 report of the Royal Commission of Aboriginal Peoples contained recommendations to improve relationships between Indigenous and non-Indigenous Canadians, including education as one of the key steps to reconciliation. In response to these recommendations, KAIROS, a Canadian faith-based ecumenical organization, developed the program in 1997 in consultation with Indigenous elders and representatives. The Truth and Reconciliation Commission in 2015 again identified education as a key area for improving relationships between Indigenous and non-Indigenous people in Canada, after which the blanket exercise grew in popularity.

== Format ==
Blanket exercise events tell the story of Canadian history from an Indigenous perspective. Participants stand on blankets that represent lands inhabited by First Nations, Inuit, and Métis people. The facilitator, playing the role of a European "settler", walks the group through a script, telling the story of the first contact between Indigenous and non-Indigenous people. As the script progresses, blankets are folded and made smaller, representing the results of the loss of land by treaty and newly legislated reserves. People are asked to step off their blankets, symbolizing disease, war, and extinction. Blankets are removed or moved to other areas, showing the way land was taken and peoples relocated.

At the end of the exercise, only a handful of "survivors" are left standing on small squares of blankets, representing the small number of Indigenous people remaining on their traditional lands in Canada. The exercise concludes with the participants discussing the experience in groups.

== Events ==
Blanket exercises have taken place in churches, schools, community centres, and businesses across Canada. In May 2016, a series of blanket exercises were held in capital cities across Canada, culminating in a workshop on Parliament Hill on May 31, with more than 800 participants.
