= Our Saviour's Lutheran Church (Prince George, British Columbia) =

- Our Saviour's Lutheran Church
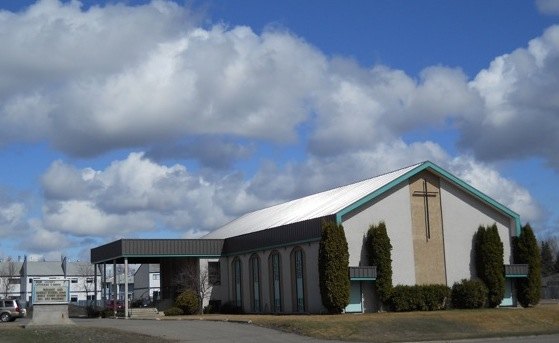
- Outside view of church on Ospika
- Our Saviour's Lutheran Church
- 43°42′N 79°24′W
- Location: Prince George, British Columbia
- Country: British Columbia
- Denomination: Evangelical Lutheran Church in Canada

History
- Founded: 12 May 1956

Our Saviour's Lutheran Church is a Lutheran church located in Prince George, British Columbia.

== History ==
Our Saviour's Lutheran Church was established on May 12, 1956, as a mission congregation of the Evangelical Lutheran Church (United States) (ELC). It was the policy of the ELC to send a man to buy property, arrange for the building of a parsonage, and then to call a pastor. Dr. Mars Dale, ELC District President, and Pastor C. Solberg, Regional director of Home Missions, were sent out to Prince George to buy property. After the property at 1094 Douglas Street was purchased, the groundbreaking ceremony for the church building took place on June 2, 1957. On November 3, 1957 the first worship service took place in a partially finished building.

In June 1990, the church at 1094 Douglas Street was sold to Prince George Funeral Services Ltd. and the church building at 3590 Dufferin Avenue was purchased from the Westwood Mennonite Brethren Church. The congregation resides in this building with nearly 170 members.

== International relief work ==
Over the years, Our Saviour's Lutheran Church has been involved in providing aid to various countries. Going back at least to 1975, a quilting group has met in the church basement to make quilts for Canadian Lutheran World Relief to be sent overseas. In 1998, the church was an important part of the Prince George relief efforts to victims of Hurricane Mitch in Honduras.

== Lutheran affiliations ==
In 1968, Our Saviour’s Lutheran Church adopted the Evangelical Lutheran Church of Canada (ELCC) constitution and on January 1, 1985, officially became a part of the Evangelical Lutheran Church in Canada (ELCIC).

== Pastors ==
- Osborne Olsen 1956 - 1963
- John Precht 1963 - 1966
- J.F. Haugen 1966 - 1968
- P.S. Olson 1968 - 1972
- Gerald Getis 1972 - 1980
- Craig Moeller 1980 - 1986
- Ron Sedo 1987 - 1993
- Roland Ziprick 1994 - 2011
- Fleming Blishen 2012–present

== Gallery of Pictures ==
Pictures of Lutheran church members

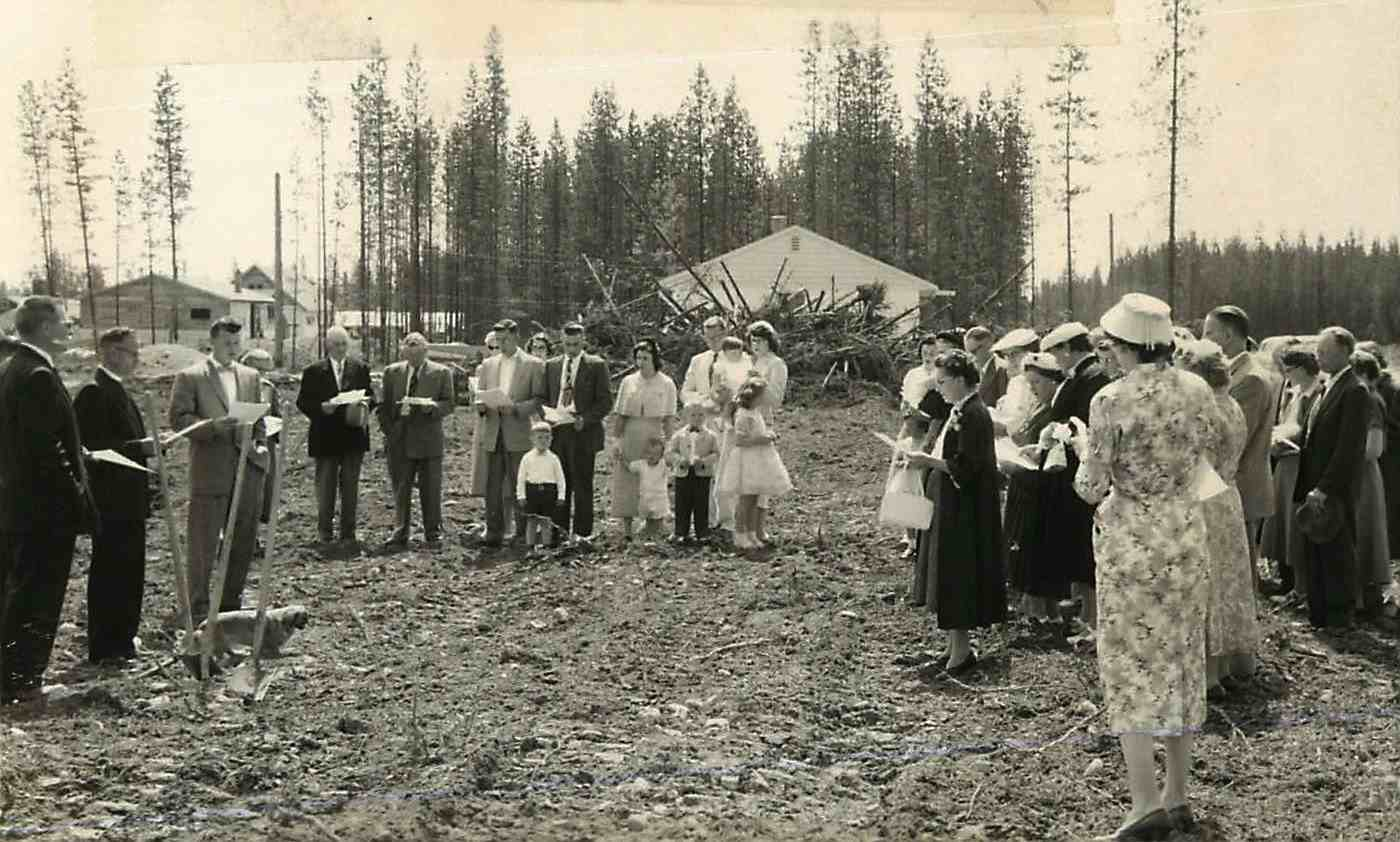
Ground breaking ceremony in 1957

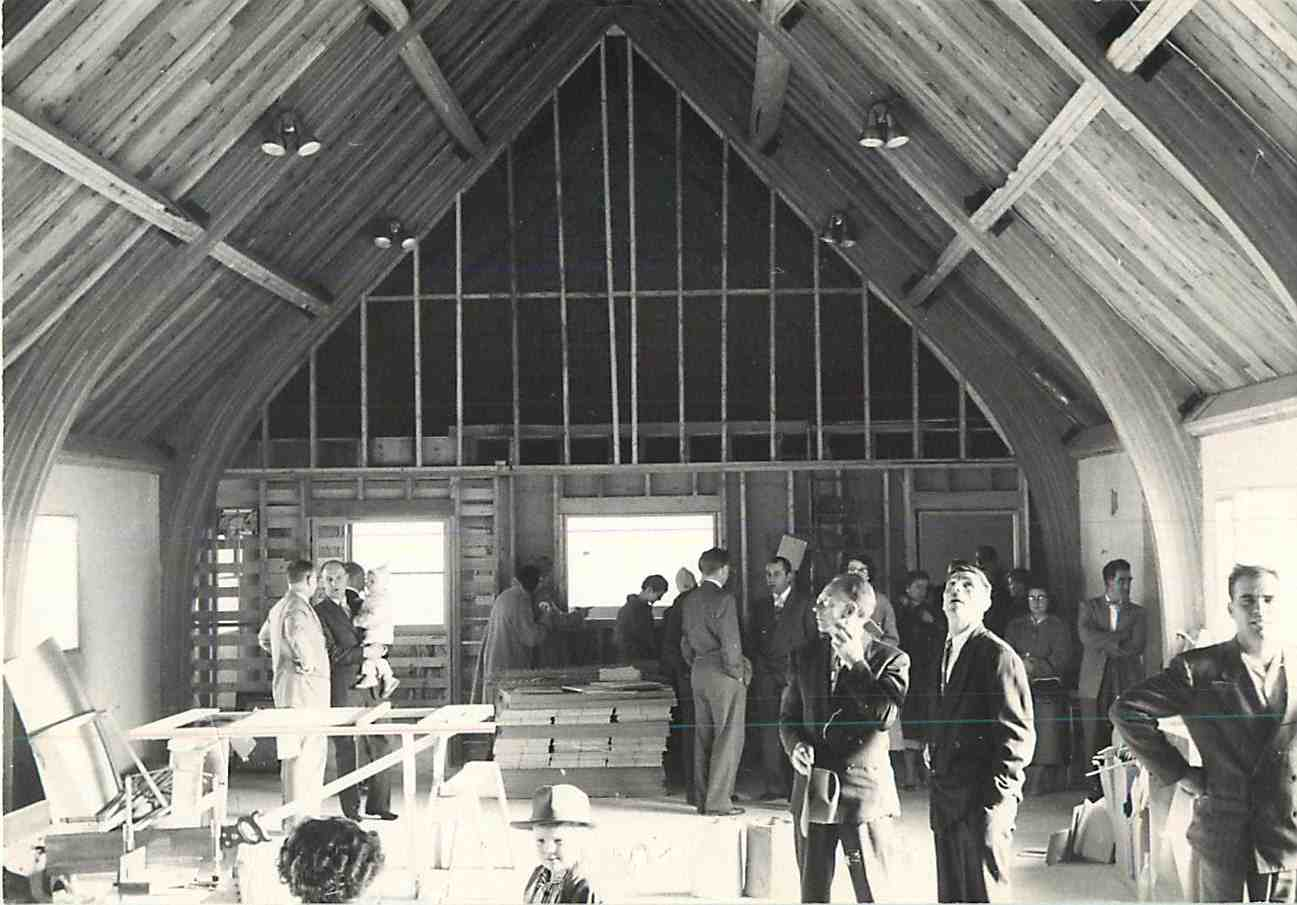
Construction of church building

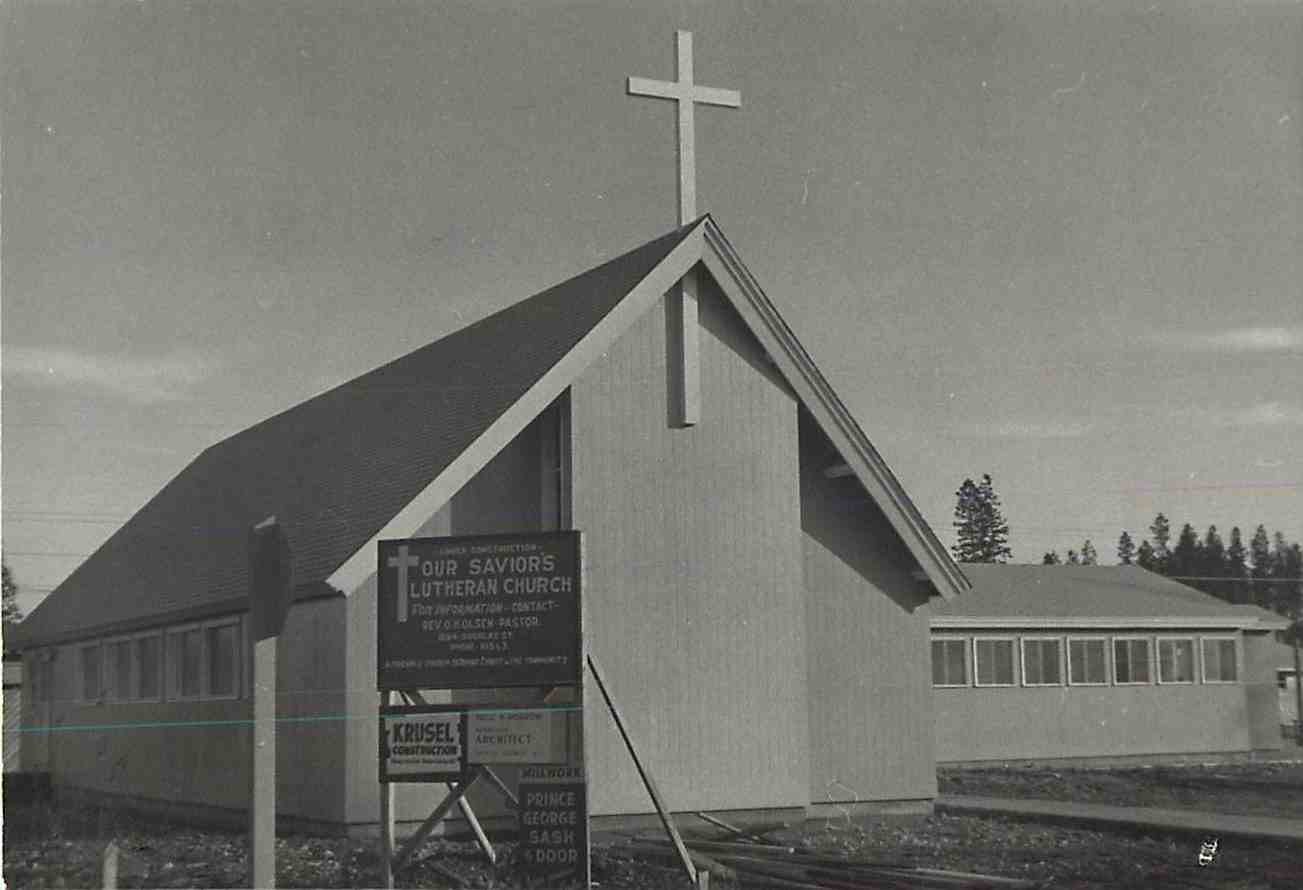
Completed Douglas Street church building

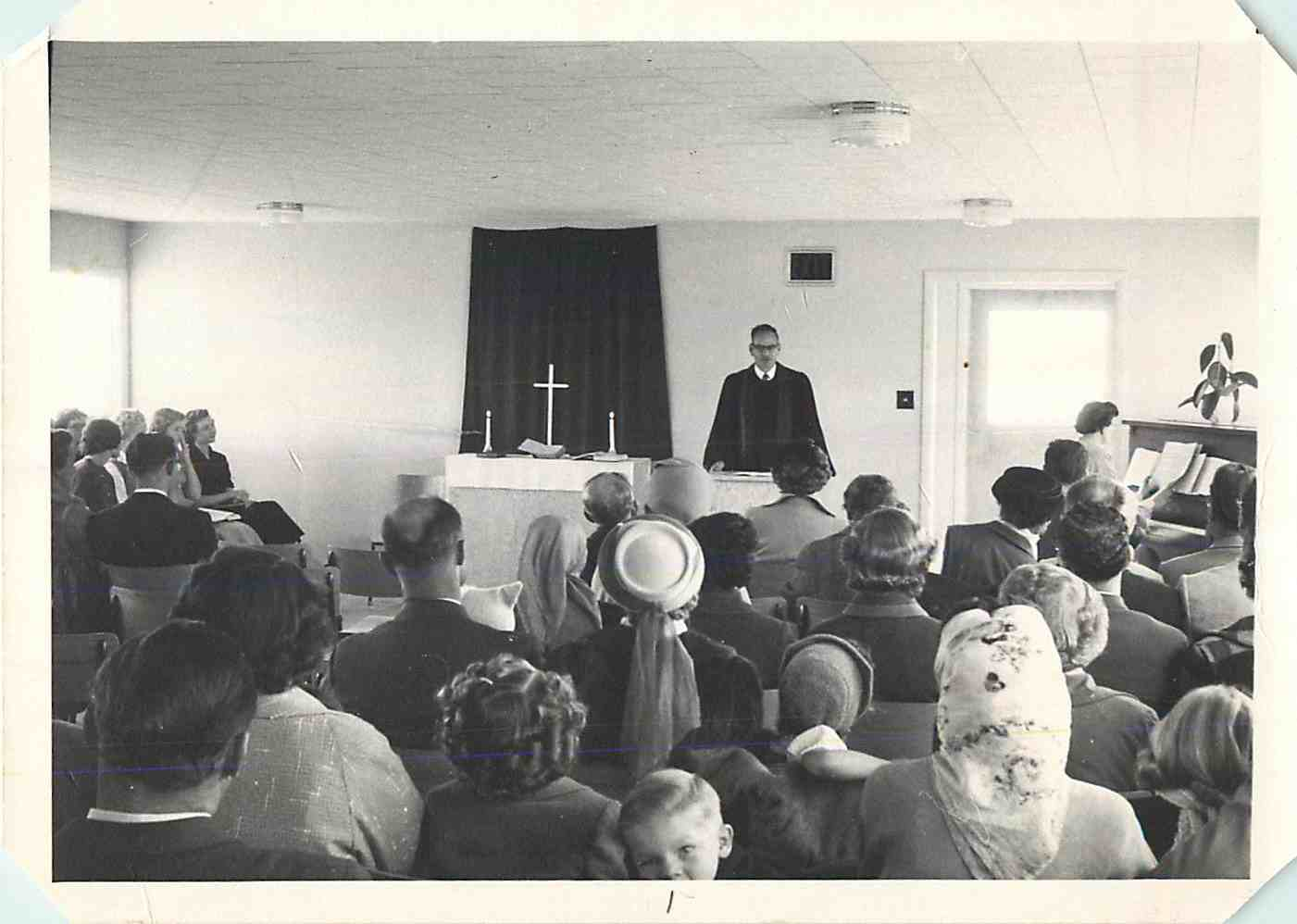
First service in the church on Sunday November 3, 1957
