= The Humanitarian Coalition =

Canadian non-governmental organization

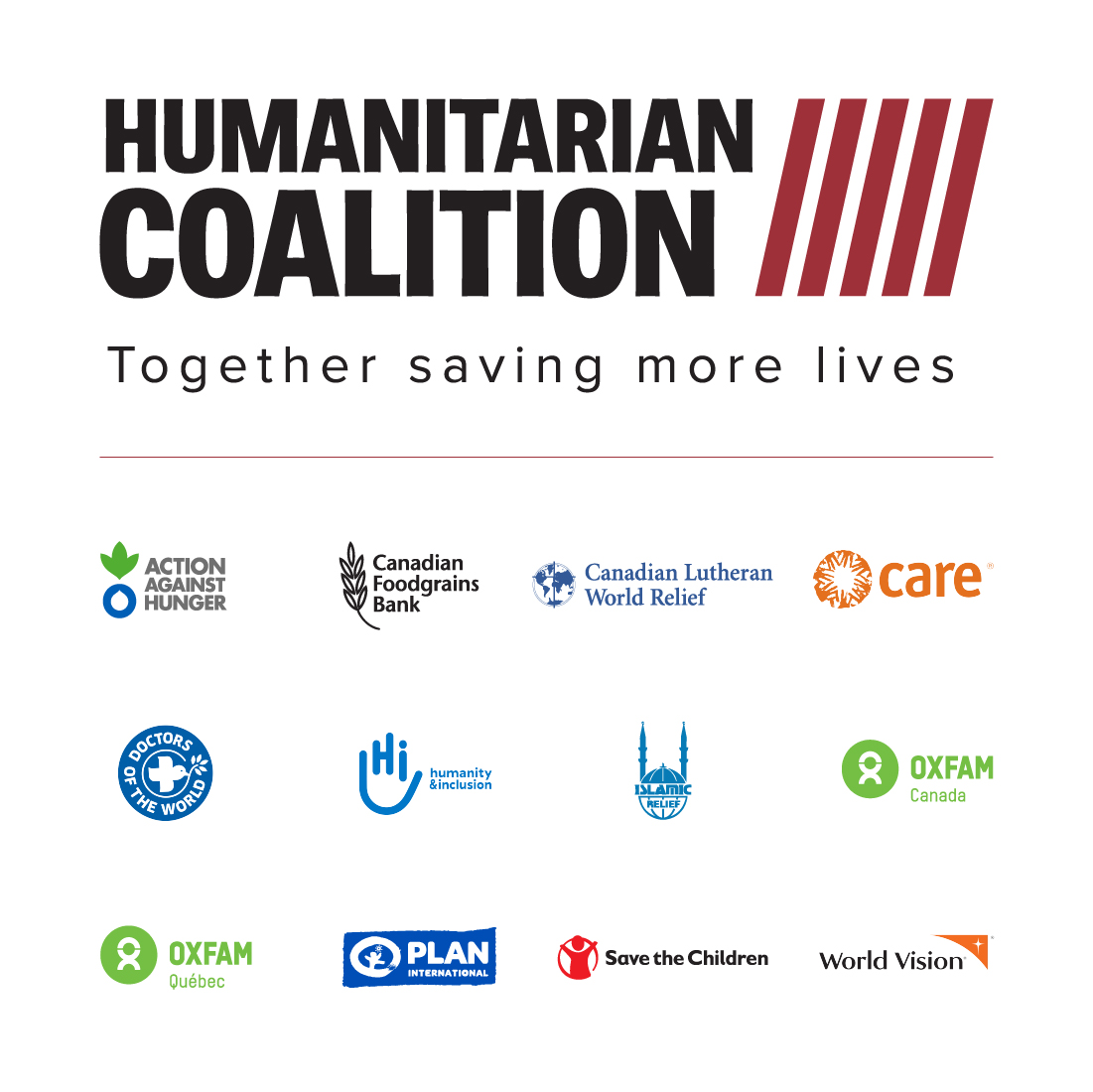
Humanitarian Coalition

The Humanitarian Coalition (French: La Coalition Humanitaire) brings together 12 Canadian non-governmental organizations consisting of Action Against Hunger, Canadian Foodgrains Bank, Canadian Lutheran World Relief, CARE Canada, Doctors of the World, Humanity & Inclusion, Islamic Relief Canada, Oxfam Canada, Oxfam-Québec, Plan International Canada, Save the Children Canada and World Vision Canada.

== Work ==
Since 2010, the Humanitarian Coalition has launched appeals for the Ukraine crisis in 2022, the Haiti earthquake in 2021, the Beirut blast in 2020, that Cyclone Idai in 2019, the Hunger Crisis affecting parts of Africa and Yemen in 2017, the Syrian Refugee Crisis in 2015-2016, the Nepal earthquake in 2015, the Ebola Outbreak in 2014, the food crisis in the Sahel in 2012, the drought in East Africa in 2011, the earthquake in Japan in 2011, the floods in Pakistan in 2010 and the earthquake in Haiti in 2010.

Previous emergencies include Typhoon Rai in the Philippines (2021), Cyclone Eloise in Mozambique (2021), Hurricane Eta in Honduras, Nicaragua, and Guatemala (2020), forest fire in Bolivia (2019), flooding in Sudan (2019).

The Humanitarian Coalition has responded to 24 major emergencies and 77 smaller-scale disasters since 2005. More than $120 million has been mobilized to meet the emergency needs of 27 million people. Joint national humanitarian appeal mechanisms have included the Disasters Emergency Committee (UK), Aktion Deutschland (Germany), and Japan Platform (Japan), as the Emergency Appeals Alliance.

== Governance ==
The Board of Directors is made up of the respective CEO or Executive Director of the member agencies. The current board includes:

- Andy Harrington: Canadian Foodgrains Bank
- Darryl Loewen: Canadian Lutheran World Relief
- Barbara Grantham: CARE Canada
- Usama Khan: Islamic Relief Canada
- Lauren Ravon: Oxfam Canada
- Béatrice Vaugrante: Oxfam-Québec
- Lindsay Glassco: Plan International Canada
- Danny Glenwright: Save the Children Canada
- Michael Messenger: World Vision Canada

The day-to-day activities of the Humanitarian Coalition are run by the organisation's secretariat based in Ottawa, Ontario, Canada. The current Executive Director of the Humanitarian Coalition is Tiffany Baggetta. Annual reports and Crisis-specific reports are available on its website in English and in French.
