= Halifax Initiative =

The Halifax Initiative is a coalition of Canadian non-governmental organizations for public interest work and education on international financial institutions. Canadian non-governmental organizations formed the Halifax Initiative in December 1994 to ensure that demands for fundamental reform of the international financial institutions (namely the World Bank and the International Monetary Fund [IMF]) would be high on the agenda of the upcoming June 1995 Group of 7 meeting in Halifax. The Halifax Initiative is a coalition of development, environment, faith-based, human rights and labour groups.

== Members of the Halifax Initiative Coalition ==
1. Canadian Conference of Catholic Bishops, Social Affairs Office
2. Canadian Council for International Co-operation
3. Canadian Friends of Burma
4. Canadian Labour Congress
5. Canadian Auto Workers, Canada Social Justice Fund
6. Development and Peace (Canadian Catholic Organization)
7. Falls Brook Centre
8. KAIROS: Canadian Ecumenical Justice Initiatives
9. MiningWatch Canada
10. The North-South Institute
11. Oxfam Canada
12. Oxfam Québec
13. RESULTS Canada
14. Rights & Democracy
15. Social Justice Committee
16. Steelworkers, Humanity Fund
17. World Inter-Action Mondiale

== History ==
The Halifax Initiative Coalition was formed in the context of an international movement of non-governmental organizations focused on evaluating the role and record of the Bretton Woods Institutions at the time of their 50th Anniversary. Canadian NGOs formed the Halifax Initiative in December 1994 to ensure that demands for fundamental reform of the international financial institutions (IFIs) were high on the agenda of the Group of 7's 1995 Halifax Summit.

Today, the Halifax Initiative is a liberal coalition of 19 development, environment, faith-based, human rights and labour groups, and has established itself as the Canadian presence for liberal public interest advocacy and education on IFI reform. Since their beginnings in 1994, they have worked through research, education, advocacy and alliance-building to fundamentally transform the international financial system and its institutions to achieve poverty eradication, environmental sustainability and an equitable re-distribution of wealth.

The coalition's work is focused on issues of:

- debt cancellation (developing countries' debt) and conditionality;
- the reform of the World Bank, the IMF and export credit agencies’ social, environmental and human rights policies and practice, with an emphasis on the mining and resource extraction sectors;
- halting structural adjustment programmes, with a focus on forced privatization; and
- mechanisms designed to control international currency speculation.

Over the past fifteen years, the support of their members has proven essential to the success of meeting the Coalition's objectives.

== Key achievements ==
Since December 1994, the Halifax Initiative has built public and policy-maker support for reform of IFIs. Some results from their efforts include the following:

=== Debt ===
Canada was the first among the Group of 7 to cancel the debt of some of the poorest and most indebted countries, and played a key role in deepening debt relief offered by the World Bank and the IMF.

=== World Bank accountability ===
Halifax Initiative has also been involved in World Bank accountability. Canada was instrumental in the revival of the Inspection Panel in 1999 and in the creation of the Independent Evaluation Office of the IMF in 2000, two key mechanisms for increasing public accountability in the Institutions.

=== Global financial architecture ===
Canada’s played a leadership role internationally in fostering debate over the reform of the global financial system, in recognition of the severe limitations of the IMF's ability to provide global economic stability. For example, Canada’s promoted emergency stand-still clauses, the creation of the G-20, and gave its support for the Tobin tax, a form of capital control.

=== Tobin tax work ===
On March 23, 1999, due in part to the Halifax Initiative work with Members of Parliament, members from all five political parties contributed to a vote which passed a private member motion on the Tobin tax. The motion was originally brought forward by New Democratic Party MP Lorne Nystrom. The motion passed by a margin of 164 to 83, including that of 131 Liberal Party of Canada members. As a result, discussions of the Tobin Tax reemerged in national referendums around the world and in United Nations' studies, and lent growing support for global taxes.

=== Export credit agencies ===
Halifax Initiative has also done work in relation to export credit agencies. In recent years, the Canadian government adopted legislation that requires Canada’s export credit agency (ECA), Export Development Canada, to take into account the environment and to disclose information to the public on the projects it supports. These changes came after over 130,000 Canadians demanded change in a letter-writing campaign facilitated by the Halifax Initiative.

During 2006/7, the Halifax Initiative participated in the multi-stakeholder Advisory Group to the National Roundtables on Corporate Social Responsibility and the Canadian Extractive Industry in Developing Countries (EDC). The participation of Halifax Initiative staff in the Advisory Group facilitated the inclusion of recommendations regarding EDC in the final, consensus-based report. Those recommendations concern the adoption of enhanced transparency, human rights and environmental policies by EDC.

The Halifax Initiative has been actively engaged in the mandate of the UN Secretary-General's Special Representative on business and human rights. In 2008, Halifax Initiative submitted an analysis on the human rights obligations of export credit agencies to the Special Representative, John Ruggie. Mr. Ruggie acknowledged Halifax Initiative's work in this area and has called for enhanced human rights due diligence by export credit agencies.

=== Projects considered unworthy by the Halifax Initiative ===
The Halifax Initiative worked on advocacy and media work around the Western China Poverty Reduction Project, and the Alumysa Aluminum smelter in Patagonia. These projects were subsequently cancelled or suspended.

=== Relations between civil society and the Government of Canada ===
Among other things, Halifax Initiative institutionalized bi-annual civil society consultations with the Finance Minister on international financial institutions issues.

=== Public debate in Canada ===
Halifax Initiative has informed thousands of Canadians through their Teach-Ins, film-screenings, conferences, tours and press releases about issues related to and including the World Bank, IMF, G20, G8, privatization, human rights and international debt.
