= Andrew McGuire =

American trauma prevention specialist

- Born: 1945 (age 80–81); Oakland, California
- Occupation: trauma prevention specialist

Andrew McGuire (born in 1945 in Oakland, California) is an American trauma prevention specialist and grassroots campaigner. He was the first Executive Director of Action Against Burns (Boston, 1973–75), founder and Executive Director of the Burn Council (San Francisco General Hospital, 1975–1981), which was renamed the Trauma Foundation, in 1981. He is currently the Executive Director of California OneCare, a campaign to establish a "Medicare for All" type health insurance for all residents of California.

== Life ==
He was severely burned as a seven-year-old child when his pajamas ignited while standing next to a kitchen stove. He began his injury prevention work in 1973, where he was the first Executive Director of Action Against Burns, which helped establish a state fire resistance standard for children's pajamas (sizes 7-14) that helped eliminate pajama-related burn injuries to children. The Massachusetts state standard was adopted by the U.S. Consumer Product Safety Commission as a federal standard in mid-1975. And, in 1973, he established one of the first self-help groups for burn survivors in the U.S.

After he returned to California in 1975, and established the Burn Council, he initiated an international campaign for self-extinguishing cigarettes (also known as Fire Safe Cigarettes). The Campaign for Fire Safe Cigarettes was officially launched on May 24, 1979. As of April, 2010, all 50 states in the U.S. have passed identical laws mandating Fire Safe Cigarettes. The exact same mandating regulations are in effect in Canada, Finland, South Africa, Australia, and all 27 countries of the European Union, among other countries. Initial results in the U.S. show up to a major reduction in fires, fire deaths and injuries due to the mandatory sale of fire safe cigarettes.

Andrew broke a New Jersey state court protective order he was under and provided secret documents from Philip Morris tobacco company, entitled "Project Hamlet," to Lowell Bergman at CBS's 60 Minutes. These 1,400 pages of documents detailed nearly a decade of secret Philip Morris research, begun in 1979, developing Fire Safe Cigarettes. These documents were exposed to the world during a Bergman produced 60 Minutes episode in March, 1994, hosted by Mike Wallace. This was the first "proof" from within the tobacco industry that it was possible to produce a commercially viable Fire Safe Cigarette. In a deposition of a researcher at Philip Morris, it was explained that the secret research project was code named "Project Hamlet" as an "inside joke" at the research labs. The joke they found amusing was that the research involved the concern: "To burn or not to burn."

As a footnote to his work campaigning for Fire Safe Cigarettes, Andrew introduced Jeffrey Wigand (the whistleblower and former head of Research and Development for Brown & Williamson Tobacco. Co.) to Lowell Bergman. The relationship between Wigand and Bergman was the subject of the 1999 Hollywood film, The Insider, starring Russell Crowe (playing Wigand) and Al Pacino (playing Bergman). Andrew also introduced Wigand to Dr. David Kessler's staff at the U.S. Food and Drug Administration.

In January, 1981, Andrew was asked to join the original Board of Directors of Mothers Against Drunk Drivers (MADD) and, in 1983, became Acting Executive Director for a brief period. He was the Executive Director of the Million Mom March and chaired the march on the U.S. Capitol Mall on May 14, 2000 that was attended by over 700,000. In California, during the 1990s he led the statewide campaigns to ban handguns (Saturday Night Specials) and .50 caliber sniper rifles. Currently, he is Executive Director of CaliforniaOneCare.org (a campaign for a "Medicare" type health care system for all residents of California).

He is also a filmmaker and has produced (or co-produced) 6 documentary films and 3 educational films that are directly related to his work in trauma prevention and self-help. He has published numerous peer reviewed articles related to his advocacy work and has appeared in the media many times since 1974, including 60 Minutes, Good Morning America, the Today Show, MacNeil/Lehrer, CBS, ABC and NBC Evening News, BBC, Australian and Canadian Broadcasting Corporations and more.

== Awards and honors ==
- 1996-Honorary Doctor of Humane Letters, California State University, conferred at Sonoma State University
- 1989-Honorary Doctor of Humane Letters, University of New England
- 1985 to 1990- MacArthur Prize Fellow MacArthur Fellows Program
- 1982 to 1985-Kellogg National Leadership Fellowship
- 1982-Emmy Award for film, "Here's Looking At You, Kid" which aired on NOVA, PBS
- 2005-"The John Joseph Moakley Award," from the Harvard School of Public Health
- 2002-"Andrew McGuire CIR Watchdog Award," from the Center for Investigative Reporting, SF, CA

== Works ==
- "How the tobacco industry continues to keep the home fires burning", Tobacco Control, 1999, ISSN 1468-3318
