= Dutch Lenten Campaign Foundation =

Roman Catholic aid agency for the Netherlands

- Vastenactie
- Founded: 1961
- Purpose: socio-economic, small scale, focused on self-help.
- Location: The Hague, The Netherlands
- Region served: countries in Africa, Asia and Latin America
- Revenue: € 5 million
- Website: www.vastenactie.nl

Dutch Lenten Campaign Foundation (Dutch: Stichting Bisschoppelijke Vastenaktie Nederland) is the Roman Catholic aid agency for the Netherlands. The foundation is supported by the local churches here and in developing countries. The organization campaigns in cooperation with private initiatives, especially during the Advent period before Christmas and the Lenten period before Easter.

The Dutch Bishops Lenten Campaign Foundation is an initiative of the Dutch bishops led by Cardinal Alfrink in 1961. Since 2011 she is also responsible for the Advent campaign. The Lenten Campaign is best known for the Lenten Campaign pockets. It is a small organization in The Hague that works with thousands of volunteers in Parishes, villages and cities in the Netherlands. The scope of Lenten Campaign lies primarily in Africa, Asia, Latin America and Eastern Europe and has a disposable budget of about 5 million euros (2012).

== Campaigns ==
The Foundation performs various campaigns. Each campaign has its own theme. The supported projects are socio-economic in nature, on small scale, and focused on self-help.

- Lenten Campaign asks to slow down, for another person, in the period between carnival and Easter.
- Advent Campaign wants to bring light to those who live on the margins of society, in the period before Christmas.

The revenues of the campaigns of this charity organisation support hundreds of projects in developing countries.

== History ==
The Lenten campaign started in 1961, not in place of existing missionary activities, but was an additional fundraising activity for alleviating acute needs in dioceses in developing countries. More importantly, encouraging a spirit of detachment and sacrifice at a time of increasing prosperity and rising military spending. The execution was placed in the hands of the parishes. Workgroups spread the Lenten campaign pockets. The board of the Lenten selected each year the project applications received. From 1965 14 national aid agencies went together in the international umbrella organization CIDSE, International Working Group for socio - economic development. The international Lenten Campaign had an eye for social and political injustices in places such as South America and the Philippines and supported the resistance against it. In 1995, the development organizations Lenten Campaign and Cebemo merged. The aim of the merger was a pooling of resources and increase the effectiveness and efficiency as well as cost savings. Cordaid was formed in 1999 from a merger of two Catholic development organizations: Memisa Medicus Mundi ( 1925) and Mensen in nood (1914 ), and was simultaneously entered into with Bilance (an intensive cooperation organization between Lenten Campaign and Cebemo). The Lenten Campaign Foundation was co-founder of Cordaid. End of 2011, the campaigning partnership with Cordaid ended.
