= Broederlijk Delen =

Flemish aid and development agency

Broederlijk Delen is a Flemish aid and development agency, which specializes in trying to improve the living conditions of rural communities in Africa and Latin America.

At the international level Broederlijk Delen is a member of Coopération Internationale pour le Développement et la Solidarité (CIDSE), the umbrella organization for Catholic development agencies from Europe and North America.

Since 2011 Broederlijk Delen has been led by Thérèse Coens.

== Methods ==
In the global south Broederlijk Delen puts the local rural population's own plans at the center of its work. They support local initiatives or organizations rather than initiating their own projects.

Broederlijk Delen cooperates with about 160 partner organisations, which receive financial support. Broederlijk Delen is active in 13 countries: six of these countries are in Africa, six in Latin America, and they also operate in Israel and Palestine.

In Flanders Broederlijk Delen is active in policy and advocacy work. It also tries to raise awareness and encourage action. The highlight of the work of Broederlijk Delen in Flanders is its annual fundraising campaign during Lent, the 40 days that precede Easter. In 2016 it collected 3.1 million euros during its Lent campaign.

Broederlijk Delen has chosen to address inequality in rural areas by focusing on the following three themes:

1. Right to food
2. Sustainable management of natural resources
3. Participation and peace

== Background ==
Broederlijk Delen was founded in 1961 as a relief organization as a reaction to the famine in the Congolese Kasaï region. The Catholic Church called during Lent for donations for people in need there. After this first call Broederlijk Delen evolved into a permanent aid and development NGO.
