= Trócaire =

Official overseas development agency of the Catholic Church in Ireland

- Established: 1973
- Founder: Irish Catholic Bishops' Conference
- Type: Nonprofit
- Registration no.: 20204842
- Legal status: Company limited by guarantee
- Purpose: development aid and humanitarian aid overseas, education of the Irish about the root causes of poverty and injustice
- Headquarters: Maynooth College
- Location: County Kildare, Ireland
- Coordinates: 53.3804°N 6.5960°W
- Region served: Worldwide
- Chair of board: Bishop Paul Dempsey
- CEO: Seán Farrell
- Affiliations: Caritas Internationalis, Caritas Europa, CIDSE, Dóchas
- Revenue: €89,655,000 (2025/2026)
- Expenses: €87,917,000 (2025/2026)
- Staff: 508 (2025/2026)
- Website: www.trocaire.org

Trócaire (Irish pronunciation: [ˈt̪ˠɾˠoːkəɾʲə], meaning "compassion") is an international non-governmental organization (INGO) which is based in Ireland. It was founded, in 1973, as the official overseas development agency of the Catholic Church in Ireland. Trócaire is involved in humanitarian and development programs in mostly developing countries. It is a member of the global Caritas Internationalis confederation and its subregion Caritas Europa as well as of the Catholic NGO network CIDSE and the Irish NGO network Dóchas.

== History ==
The roots of the charity lie in Pope Paul VI's 1967 encyclical Populorum Progressio, which called for people to take notice and respond to the injustices that were occurring all round the world. Then, in response to the 1973 floods which ravaged Bangladesh, Cardinal William Conway saw the need for a church agency which would co-ordinate charitable donations originating in Ireland. Trócaire's life began with a pastoral letter written in the same year by the Bishops of Ireland. In it, they set out the aims of Trócaire:

Abroad, it will give whatever help lies within its resources to the areas of greatest need among the developing counties. At home, it will try to make us all more aware of the needs of these countries and of our duties towards them. These duties are no longer a matter of charity but of simple justice.

— On behalf of the Hierarchy of Ireland, Feast of the Presentation of the Lord, 2 February 1973.

The headquarters of Trócaire are in St. Patrick's College, Maynooth, County Kildare.

In 2021, Trócaire became a member of the Irish Emergency Alliance, a joint appeal mechanism in Ireland dedicated to large-scale humanitarian fundraising. The alliance comprises Trócaire and seven other Irish charities.

== Programmes ==
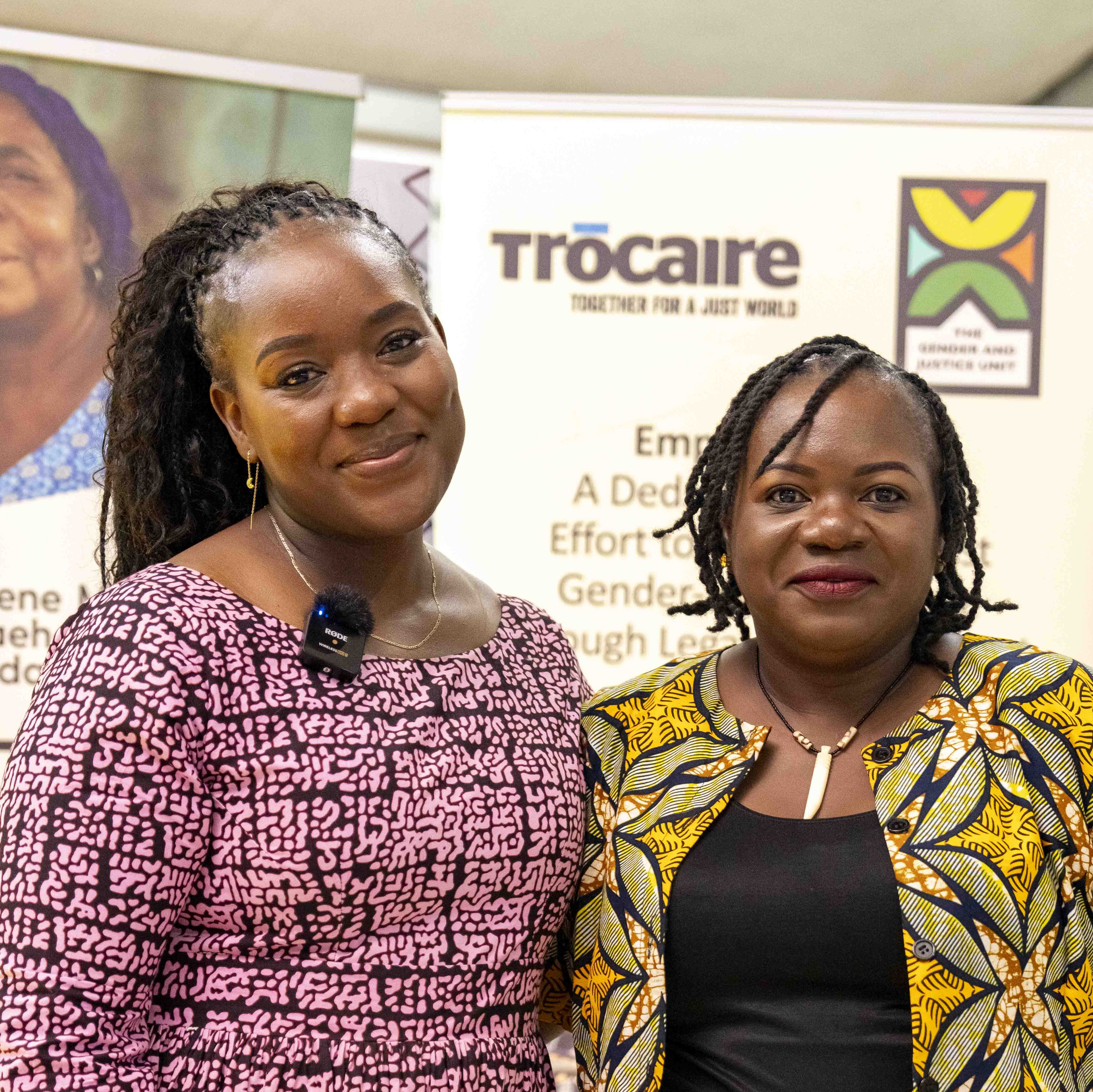
Trócaire supports the Gender and Justice Unit in Malawi

As of 2026, Trócaire supported programmes across 19 countries in Africa, Asia, Central America, the Middle East and Europe. The aims of the charity's programmes include supporting gender equality, responding to emergencies and disasters, and addressing the impacts of climate change. According to Trócaire's 2020 annual report, the charity's programme work benefitted over 2.5 million people.

Overseas, Trócaire works across a number of programme areas and delivers support through local partner organisations and churches, with the goal of helping communities and families to free themselves from poverty, cope with and adapt to climate change, promote gender equality, tackle injustice, provide emergency relief and defend human rights.

In Ireland, the charity seeks to raise awareness about the causes of poverty through a number of outreach programmes and educational campaigns.

== Past activities ==
In 1982, Trócaire worker Sally O'Neill and Michael D. Higgins (who would later be elected President of Ireland) visited El Salvador to investigate the 1981 El Mozote massacre, in which the Salvadoran Army killed more than 800 civilians. In 1984, Bishop Eamonn Casey, then chairman of Trócaire, refused to meet Ronald Reagan during the president's visit to Ireland, as a protest against the United States government's support of the Salvadoran military. O'Neill also worked in Ethiopia during the famine in the mid-1980s and played a central role in Trócaire's response to the famine in Somalia in the early 1990s.

In response to the 2004 Indian Ocean earthquake disaster, the organisation raised a record €27.7 million in Ireland through church collections, street collections, and private donations.

== Fundraising ==
Trócaire each year runs a fundraising appeal during Lent, with Trócaire boxes distributed through churches and schools, then collected after Easter. The first Lenten box campaign, later described by RTÉ as "one of the most identifiable charity collection methods in Ireland", raised £250,000. The 2015 appeal raised about €8.3 million.
