= Canadian Lutheran World Relief =

Canadian Lutheran World Relief (CLWR) is a humanitarian agency engaged in community development, refugee resettlement, emergency relief, basic commodity shipments, volunteer placement and alternative trade. It classifies its activities as falling into four main areas: humanitarian response, food security and livelihoods, education and skills training, and refugee resettlement. While strengthening food security and economic development, CLWR subscribes to the United Nations Millennium Development Goals in planning community development and has declared a commitment everywhere to environmental protection, gender equality, organizational strengthening and HIV/AIDS prevention.

== History ==
CLWR was founded in March 1946 by Lutherans in Canada who wished to respond to refugee and relief needs following the Second World War. The group sent clothing, bedding, blankets and food to displaced persons in Europe and assisted thousands of refugeesto find homes in Canada.

== Current scope ==
Development work is focused in Zambia, Mozambique, India, Bolivia and Peru. A small-scale irrigation program, through Canadian Foodgrains Bank, of which CLWR is a founding supporter, operates in Ethiopia. Relief commodities have been shipped to Mauritania, Zambia and Tanzania.

CLWR undertakes community development in partnership with the Lutheran World Federation, with support funding from the Canadian International Development Agency (CIDA) and donations from individual supporters. CLWR also works with local partners in Bolivia, Peru and Ethiopia, where food-for-work programs help to supply potable water to local communities.

Since 1979, CLWR has annually sponsored about 100 refugees to Canada as an official sponsorship agreement holder with the federal government Canada. CLWR's Toronto and Vancouver offices administer the refugee program.

CLWR responds to natural and human disasters in partnership with other members of the international aid networks of the Lutheran World Federation and Action by Churches Together International. The CLWR claims that all donations designated for emergency response measures are forwarded for relief activities and that CLWR does not retain any portion for administrative costs.

Through the We Care program, CLWR annually delivers thousands of quilts and kits around the world, wherever they judge the need to be greatest. The donated kits, assembled by individuals and groups who are interested in supporting this work, contain clothing, hygiene products, school supplies, sewing goods, etc.

== International aid and volunteer service ==
CLWR offers six-month to two-year overseas volunteer opportunities in Latin America, Africa and Asia, organized in cooperation with the Lutheran World Federation or local partner organizations, where they try to match volunteers' skills with locally determined needs.

CLWR is a member of ACT Development, a global alliance of churches and related agencies working on development, and is one of 15 partner charities associated with Global Affairs Canada's Canadian Foodgrains Bank. In 2021, the charity received $1.1m from Canadian Foodgrains Bank to run its international aid programs.

== See also ==
There is a Canadian Lutheran World Relief fonds at Library and Archives Canada. The archival reference number is R3184.
