= Development and Peace (Canada) =

Canadian Catholic development aid and humanitarian agency

- Développement et paix
- Established: 1967
- Founder: Canadian Conference of Catholic Bishops
- Type: Nonprofit
- Purpose: development aid, humanitarian aid
- Headquarters: 555 René Lévesque Boulevard
- Location: Montreal, Canada
- Coordinates: 45.50376566639665°N 73.56625358324324°W
- Origins: Catholic Social Teaching
- Region served: worldwide
- President: Brenda Arakaza
- Affiliations: Caritas Internationalis, The Humanitarian Coalition, CIDSE, Halifax Initiative
- Revenue: CAD 21,379,227 (2022–2023)
- Expenses: CAD 20,345,128 (2022–2023)
- Website: www.devp.org

Development and Peace, officially the Canadian Catholic Organization for Development and Peace and also known as Caritas Canada (in French: Organisation catholique canadienne pour le développement et la paix, or simply Développement et paix) is the official international development and humanitarian aid agency of the Catholic Church in Canada. It is a member of Caritas Internationalis, CIDSE, the Halifax Initiative and many other networks.

Through its membership in the Canadian Foodgrains Bank, Development and Peace is also connected to the Humanitarian Coalition, a coalition of Canadian non-governmental organizations that partner with the Government of Canada, and mobilize media, businesses and individual Canadians to raise money in response to humanitarian catastrophes around the world.

== History ==
In 1967, the Canadian Conference of Catholic Bishops established Development and Peace in response to Pope Paul VI's encyclical letter Populorum Progressio on the topic of "the development of peoples". Along with the other principles of Catholic social teaching, that founding principle still guides Development and Peace today.

Since 1994, Development and Peace has been a member of the Halifax Initiative, a coalition of Canadian non-governmental organizations for public interest work and education on international financial institutions. In 2001, Development and Peace became the official Canadian member of the global confederation Caritas Internationalis.

In 2012, after a policy change of the Canadian International Development Agency, Development and Peace saw its funding from the government decrease by two thirds.

In April 2018, a conflict arose between Development and Peace and the Canadian Bishops, who accused the organisation of promoting or tolerating contraception. This conflict lasted for several years and led to a review of whether the work of the more than 200 partner organisations of Development and Peace aligned with the Church's social and moral teachings. After three years of investigations by the Canadian Bishops Conference, Development and Peace continued its work with all but 24 partner organisations.

== Structure ==
In 2023, Development and Peace had more than 12,700 members across Canada. They are volunteers who contribute to educating the Canadian public and Canadian politicians about social justice and international development issues. They organise fundraisers and participate in the governance of the organisation. Members elect representatives to the National Council and its various committees.

In addition to two national offices in Montreal and Toronto, Development and Peace has 15 smaller regional offices staffed by Animators, who train and empower members as agents of change. Development and Peace welcomes volunteers of all faiths to join the movement to build a world of justice.

== Work ==
The organisation's regular programming spans more than 30 countries in Africa, Asia, Latin America and the Middle East. Individual projects are proposed by partner organisations - generally local non-governmental organisations or social movements. The programs and projects are meant to support the poor as they improve their living conditions in a sustainable way and increase their participation in their country's development.

Several times a year, program officers from Development and Peace's main office in Montreal, Quebec, visit the partners to evaluate progress, provide training and resources, foster networking between organisations and plan future activities.

Development and Peace's emergency program exists for one purpose: to provide aid to needy individuals and communities. Much of this work is done through the other member organisations of Caritas Internationalis, one of the world's largest humanitarian aid networks.

== Income ==
In 2022–2023, Development and Peace had a revenue of C$21 million. The main fundraising tool for the organisation is the "Share Lent" campaign, organised annually since 1968 during Lent. In 2023, it raised more than C$5.1 million. The largest income of institutional funding comes from the bilateral programs with Global Affairs Canada, representing more than C$7.7 million in 2022–2023.

== See also ==
- Caritas Internationalis
- The Humanitarian Coalition
- CIDSE
- Halifax Initiative
