= Fire-safe cigarette =

Cigarette designed to extinguish quickly

Fire-safe cigarettes (FSC) are cigarettes that are designed to extinguish more quickly than standard cigarettes if ignored, with the intention of preventing accidental fires. They are also known as lower-ignition-propensity (LIP), reduced-fire-risk (RFR), self-extinguishing, or reduced-ignition-propensity (RIP) cigarettes. In the United States, FSC above the barcode signifies that the cigarettes sold are fire-standards-compliant (FSC).

However, fire-safe cigarettes do not completely eliminate the risk of residential fires: empirical estimates suggest they reduce the risk by about 11% to 45%, depending on the country and the types of fires examined.

Fire-safe cigarettes are produced by adding two to three thin bands of less-porous cigarette paper along the length of the cigarette, creating a series of harder-to-burn "speed bumps". As the cigarette burns down, it will tend to be extinguished at each of these points unless the user is periodically intensifying the ember by inhaling. FSC cigarettes typically use ethylene vinyl acetate (EVA) adhesive in the banding material.

== History ==
In 1929, a cigarette-ignited fire in Lowell, Massachusetts, caught the attention of U.S. Congresswoman Edith Nourse Rogers (R-MA); she called for the National Bureau of Standards (NBS) (now the National Institute of Standards and Technology (NIST)) to develop the first less fire-prone cigarette, which NBS introduced in 1932. The Boston Herald American covered the story on 31 March 1932, noting that after three years of research the NBS had developed a "self-snubbing" cigarette and had suggested that cigarette manufacturers "take up the idea". None did.

In 1973, the United States Congress established the Consumer Product Safety Commission (CPSC) to protect the public from hazardous products. Congress excluded tobacco products from its jurisdiction while assigning it responsibility for flammable fabrics.

In 1978 Andrew McGuire, a burn survivor, started a grassroots campaign to prevent house fire deaths by changing the cigarette. McGuire secured funding for an investigation into cigarettes and fires which became Cigarettes and Sofas: How the Tobacco Lobby Keeps the Home Fires Burning. Massachusetts congressman Joe Moakley introduced federal FSC legislation in the autumn of 1979 after a cigarette fire in his district killed a family of seven; California senator Alan Cranston authored a matching Senate bill.

To forestall legislation mandating the inclusion of fire-safety features in cigarettes, the US Tobacco Institute financed a fire prevention education program in parallel with the campaign Fighting Fire with Firemen.

In 1984, the Cigarette Safety Act funded a three-year National Bureau of Standards (later NIST) study on how cigarettes and furnishings ignited and remained lit. This understanding of the physics of ignition enabled the NBS team to develop two test methods for the ignition strength of cigarettes, under the auspices of the CPSC. This reported to US Congress in 1987 that it was technically feasible and maybe commercially feasible to make a cigarette that was less likely to start fires. Legislative activity continued in the states while the federal government, cigarette companies, and advocates discussed next steps. McGuire and colleagues continued to inform advocates about cigarette fires and prevention strategies, legislation and liability.

A compromise led to the US Fire Safe Cigarette Act of 1990, which required additional NIST research on the interaction of burning cigarettes with soft furnishings, such as upholstered furniture and beds. The resulting study, while contentious, laid the groundwork for a flammability test method for cigarettes. Federal efforts to implement a standard stalled, as the Reagan and Bush administrations preferred free markets to regulation. The grassroots campaign focused on state efforts. McGuire continued to publish progress reports.

Based on the NIST research, ASTM International's Committee E05 on Fire Standards developed E 2187, a "Standard Test Method for Measuring the Ignition Strength of Cigarettes", which evaluates cigarette's capacity to set fire to bedding and upholstered furniture in 2002. In 2000, New York passed the first state law requiring the introduction of cigarettes that have a lower likelihood of starting a fire, with flammability evaluated by E 2187. By spring 2006, four more states had passed laws modeled on New York's: Vermont, New Hampshire, California, and Illinois. McGuire published a campaign update. In 2006 The National Fire Protection Association decided to fund the Fire Safe Cigarette Coalition to accelerate this grassroots movement.

Since 1982, multiple lawsuits have been filed regarding cigarette-ignited fire deaths and injuries. The first successful lawsuit resulted in a 2 million dollar settlement for a young child severely burned in a car fire allegedly caused by a cigarette.

== Regional implementation ==
=== United States ===
As of August 26, 2011, all 50 states and the District of Columbia had passed state legislation modeled on New York's original bill, mandating the sale of fire-safe cigarettes. State laws generally contain provisions permitting the sale of non-FSCs that have been tax-stamped by wholesalers and retailers in the state prior to the effective date of the state's FSC law. The laws require cigarettes to exhibit a greater likelihood of self-extinguishing using the E2187 test from ASTM International. The E2187 standard is cited in U.S. state legislation and is the basis for the fire-safe cigarette law in effect in Canada. The current edition of ASTM E2187 is the E2187-24 which was approved in June 2024 and published in July 2024. ASTM E2187 is a laboratory test focused on ignition of soft furnishings (e.g., bedding and upholstered furniture) and specifically states that it does not incorporate all factors required for real-world fire hazard or risk assessment. It is being considered for legislation in other countries.

=== Canada ===
On October 1, 2005, Canada became the first country to implement a nationwide cigarette fire safety standard. Canadian consumer product requirements specify that cigarettes when being tested on 10 layers of filter paper, must burn their full length no more than 25% of the time according to the ISO 12863 (as amended from time to time). Each year in Canada, fires started by smokers' materials kill approximately 70 people and cause 300 injuries, according to a study conducted by the Canadian Association of Fire Chiefs.

=== Europe ===
On November 30, 2007, 27 EU states approved a European Commission proposal to require the tobacco industry to use fire-retardant paper in all cigarettes. The European Committee for Standardization said that these types of products would be universally available. In November 2010, the General Product Safety Directive (GPSD) Committee of the European Commission agreed the standard and reached the consensus that enforcement of the standard (including at the point of sale to consumers) would start "about 12 months from its publication by CEN" – around 17 November 2011, with publication of reference to the standard in the Official Journal of the European Union. The standard was implemented on that date.

In the UK a proposal to ban the "old style" cigarettes in order to implement a fire-safe alternative was dropped as it is encompassed within the EU directive. In England by the end of March 2024, in the case of accidental dwelling fires, smoking materials were the ignition source in 6.6% but accounted for 25% of fire-related fatalities.

West of Scotland MSP Stewart Maxwell was a long-time advocate of 'fire-safer cigarettes' and called for Scotland to take a lead in developing a European standard. Maxwell consistently called on the Scottish Government to use its influence to pressure the UK Government to ensure the introduction of 'fire safer cigarettes' as soon as possible.

=== Australia ===
In Australia, around 14 people are claimed to die annually from cigarette related fires. In Victoria, Fire Rescue Victoria has reported smoking materials as a leading contributor to fatal house fires; local reporting cited FRV as stating that half of the state's 18 fatal fires in 2024 were caused by discarded cigarettes and smoking materials. The government has accepted the proposal for FSCs and is in the process of implementing regulations. Cigarette companies were required to change their products to ensure that cigarettes self-extinguish more readily before the regulations came into effect in March 2010.

== Responses from tobacco companies ==
In 2000 Philip Morris introduced the 'fire-safe' Merit cigarette, with two thicker paper bands to slow the burning. Later that year, the company received hundreds of complaints alleging that long, partly burned tobacco was falling off the tips of lit Merit cigarettes, burning skin and flammable items. An in-house scientist (Michael Lee Watkins) analyzed the data and concluded Merit to actually be a greater fire risk than conventional cigarettes. In early 2002 Watkins was fired, and Merit continued to be marketed. For concealing information about the fire hazard, the U.S. Department of Justice filed a lawsuit against Philip Morris.
