= MiningWatch Canada =

Canadian non-governmental mining oversight organization

MiningWatch Canada is a non-governmental organization based in Ottawa, Ontario. Founded in 1999, it acts as a watchdog of Canada's mining industry.

MiningWatch is part of the Canadian Network on Corporate Accountability, the Canadian Council for International Cooperation, and the Halifax Initiative.

In Finland, Europe, there is a same kind of organization Kansalaisten kaivosvaltuuskunta – MiningWatch Finland.
