= North-South Institute =

Think tank based in Ottawa, Canada

Founded in 1976, the North-South Institute (NSI) was a policy research institution or think tank based in Ottawa, Canada, and specializing in international development. The objectives of the institute were as follows:

1. To promote a greater understanding of the problems and opportunities in the field of international development through high quality and policy-relevant research;
2. To encourage collaborative research for development that will promote international discussion, policy and action;
3. To provide a non-governmental space where views on international development can be exchanged;
4. And to offer an independent and nonpartisan voice that can direct attention to important current and expected issues in international development.

For nearly four decades, NSI endeavoured to fulfill these objectives and to pursue the broad goal of reducing global poverty and inequality through effective international development. In think tank rankings, the North-South Institute was recognized as one of the leading think tanks with a budget of less than $5 million, and one of the most prominent institutions in Canada.

On September 10, 2014, the North-South Institute announced that it would close. According to a newspaper report, the closure resulted from the decision by the Department of Foreign Affairs, Trade and Development to no longer fund the institution.
