= Misereor =

German development aid organisation of the Catholic Church

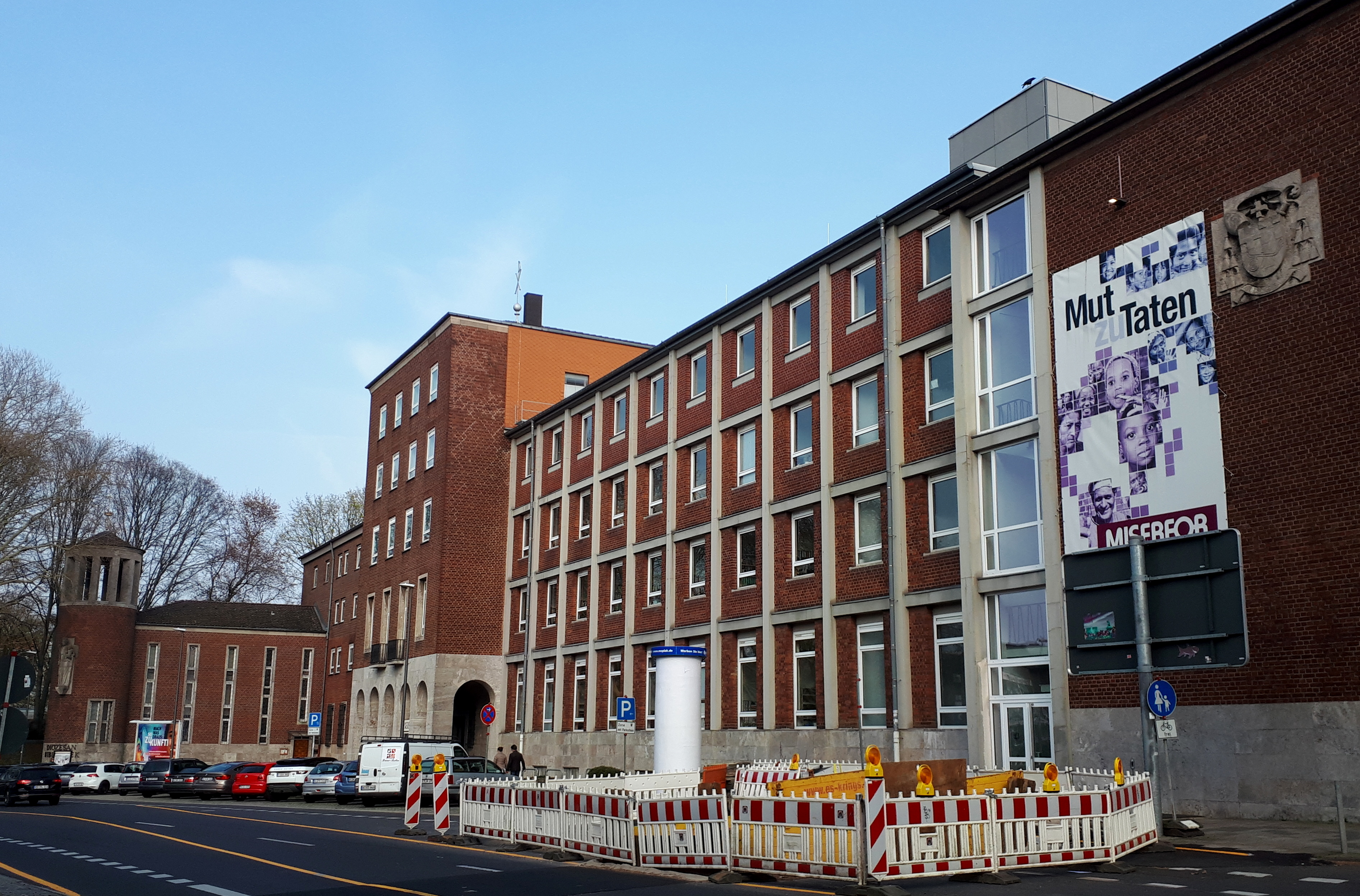
- Headquarter in Aachen
- Formation: 1958
- Location: Aachen, Germany
- Website: www.misereor.de

Misereor is a German development aid organisation of the Catholic Church. Its full name is Bischöfliches Hilfswerk Misereor (Bishops' aid agency). The name is derived from the Latin "misereor" (I have mercy). It is focused on fighting poverty worldwide and is the largest Catholic development aid in the world. The headquarter is in Aachen.

== History ==
The 76th Katholikentag in Fulda recommended the foundation of an institution to educate and support qualified lay helpers in developing countries. International Catholic women's organisations and the international Pax Christi movement called for fighting hunger. Initiated by Alfons Erb of Pax Christi, the Central Committee of German Catholics requested in 1958 from the German bishops to perform an action against hunger during Lent 1959. Misereor was founded in 1958, and collected donations of 34 million DM in Lent 1959. The office was in the Aachen Mozartstraße, as neighbours to the Bischöfliche Akademie des Bistums Aachen; it occupied rooms of the Priesterseminar Aachen.

== Projects ==
Since its foundation, Misereor supported more than 112,000 projects in Asia and Oceania, Africa, Latin America and the Caribbean (As of 2025). Focus in projects are human rights, access to safe water, fighting AIDS, global warming, poverty and gender problems. Support goes to rural development, healthcare, vocational and adult education, help to found small businesses, self-help housing, social work projects, advancement of women, and training of local leaders. Misereor collaborates with local partner organisations who know the conditions of the poor, including churches, self-help initiatives, cooperatives, human rights groups and other non-governmental organisation. Projects are monitored, exchanging experience in a continuous development process.
