= List of Hindi films of 2011 =

This is a list of films produced by the Hindi cinema industry in 2011.

== Box office collection ==
| No. | Title | Production company | Gross |
|---|---|---|---|
| 1 | Bodyguard | Reliance Entertainment; Reel Life Production | ₹252.99 crore (US$54.21 million) |
| 2 | Ra.One | Red Chillies Entertainment | ₹207 crore (US$44.35 million) |
| 3 | Don 2 | Reliance Entertainment; Excel Entertainment; Film Base Berlin | ₹202.81 crore (US$43.45 million) |
| 4 | Ready | T-Series Films; Sohail Khan Productions; One Up Entertainment; Rawail Grandsons Entertainment & Software; Wave Cinemas | ₹180 crore (US$38.57 million) |
| 5 | Zindagi Na Milegi Dobara | Eros International; Excel Entertainment | ₹163 crore (US$34.92 million) |
| 6 | Singham | Reliance Entertainment | ₹147.89 crore (US$31.69 million) |
| 7 | The Dirty Picture | Balaji Motion Pictures; ALT Entertainment | ₹117 crore (US$25.07 million) |
| 8 | Rockstar | Shree Ashtavinayak Cine Vision; Shree Ashtavinayak LFS Infra; Eros International | ₹108.70 crore (US$23.29 million) |
| 9 | Murder 2 | Vishesh Films | ₹105 crore (US$22.5 million) |
| 10 | Delhi Belly | UTV Motion Pictures; Aamir Khan Productions | ₹103 crore (US$22.07 million) |

== January – March ==
| Opening | | Title | Director | Cast | Genre | Studio | Ref |
|---|---|---|---|---|---|---|---|
| J A N | 7 | No One Killed Jessica | Raj Kumar Gupta | Rani Mukherjee, Vidya Balan | Social thriller | UTV Spotboy | |
| J A N | 7 | Impatient Vivek | Rahat Kazmi | Vivek Sudershan, Sayali Bhagat | Adult/Comedy/Romance | | |
| J A N | 14 | Yamla Pagla Deewana | Samir Karnik | Dharmendra, Sunny Deol, Bobby Deol, Kulraj Randhawa, Ajay Devgn, Mahek Chahal, Himanshu Malik, Johnny Lever | Comedy/Drama/Action | One Up Entertainment, Top Angle Productions | |
| J A N | 14 | Turning 30!!! | Alankrita Shrivastava | Purab Kohli, Gul Panag, Siddharth Makkar | Adult/Romance/Comedy | | |
| J A N | 14 | Mumbai Mast Kallander | Aman Mihani | Shilpa Shukla, Mohsin Akhtar | Comedy | | |
| J A N | 18 | Odyssey of Persistence | Sagar Ambre; Nikunj Pathak | Diksha Tomar | Social | | |
| J A N | 21 | Dhobi Ghat | Kiran Rao | Prateik Babbar, Aamir Khan, Monica Dogra | Drama | UTV Motion Pictures, Aamir Khan Productions | |
| J A N | 21 | Hostel | Manish Gupta | Vatsal Sheth, Tulip Joshi, Mukesh Tiwari | Social | | |
| J A N | 28 | Dil Toh Baccha Hai Ji | Madhur Bhandarkar | Ajay Devgn, Emraan Hashmi, Omi Vaidya, Shazahn Padamsee, Shruti Haasan, Tisca Chopra, Shraddha Das | Comedy | Bhandarkar Entertainment, Wide Frame Pictures, Baba Arts | |
| F E B | 4 | Yeh Saali Zindagi | Sudhir Mishra | Arunoday Singh, Chitrangada Singh, Irrfan Khan | Cult | Mystic Movies, Prakash Jha Productions, Cineraas Productions | |
| F E B | 4 | United Six | Vishal Aryan Singh | Parvathy Omanakuttan | Action/Thriller | | |
| F E B | 4 | Utt Pataang | Srikanth V. Velagaleti | Vinay Pathak, Mahie Gill, Murali Sharma, Mona Singh, Kurush Deboo | Comedy | Warner Bros. Pictures, Rash Productions | |
| F E B | 4 | Angel | Ganesh Acharya | Nilesh Sahay, Madalasa Sharma, Aruna Irani | Drama | | |
| F E B | 11 | Patiala House | Nikhil Advani | Rishi Kapoor, Dimple Kapadia, Akshay Kumar, Anushka Sharma | Family drama | T-Series Films, Hari Om Entertainment, People Tree Films, Emmay Entertainment | |
| F E B | 11 | Aashiqui.in | Shankhadeep | Ishaan Manhaas, Ankita Shrivastava | Romance | | |
| F E B | 18 | 7 Khoon Maaf | Vishal Bhardwaj | Priyanka Chopra, Neil Nitin Mukesh, Naseeruddin Shah, John Abraham, Irrfan Khan, Konkona Sen Sharma | Thriller/Black comedy | UTV Spotboy, VB Pictures | |
| F E B | 18 | Kaccha Limboo | Sagar Ballary | Vinay Pathak, Sarika, Rukhsar, Chinmay Kambli | Children | | |
| F E B | 18 | Masti Express | Vikram Pradhan | Rajpal Yadav, Johnny Lever, Divya Dutta, Manoj Joshi, Razzak Khan, Vijay Patkar, Rohan Shah, Vinit Jain, Sameer Mohammed | Comedy | | |
| F E B | 25 | Tanu Weds Manu | Aanand L. Rai | Madhavan, Kangana Ranaut, Jimmy Sheirgill, Ravi Kishan | Romance/Drama | Viacom18 Motion Pictures, Sanjay Singh Films, Soundrya Productions, Parmahans Creations | |
| F E B | 25 | Satrangee Parachute | Vineet Khetrapal | Jackie Shroff, Kay Kay Menon, Rupali Ganguly, Zakir Hussain | Family | | |
| M A R | 4 | Yeh Faasley | Yogesh Mittal | Anupam Kher, Pavan Malhotra | Drama | | |
| M A R | 25 | Happy Husbands | Anay | Anay, Kurush Deboo, Mohit Ghai, Ahwaan, Archana | Comedy | | |
| M A R | 25 | Monica | Sushen Bhatnagar | Divya Dutta, Ashutosh Rana | Drama | | |

== April – June ==
| Opening | | Title | Director | Cast | Genre | Studio | Ref |
|---|---|---|---|---|---|---|---|
| A P R | 1 | Game | Abhinay Deo | Abhishek Bachchan, Kangana Ranaut, Sarah Jane Dias, Jimmy Sheirgill, Boman Irani, Anupam Kher | Mystery/Action | Eros International, Excel Entertainment | |
| A P R | 1 | F.A.L.T.U | Remo D'Souza | Jackky Bhagnani, Puja Gupta, Arshad Warsi, Riteish Deshmukh | Satire/Comedy/Teen film | Pooja Entertainment | |
| A P R | 1 | Memories in March | Sanjoy Nag | Deepti Naval, Rituparno Ghosh, Raima Sen | Drama | | |
| A P R | 8 | Thank You | Anees Bazmee | Akshay Kumar, Bobby Deol, Sunil Shetty, Irrfan Khan, Sonam Kapoor, Celina Jaitly, Rimi Sen, Mallika Sherawat, Vidya Balan | Comedy | UTV Motion Pictures, Hari Om Entertainment | |
| A P R | 15 | Teen Thay Bhai | Mirgdeep Singh Lamba | Om Puri, Shreyas Talpade, Deepak Dobriyal, Ragini Khanna | Drama | PVR Pictures, ROMP Pictures | |
| A P R | 22 | Dum Maaro Dum | Rohan Sippy | Abhishek Bachchan, Bipasha Basu, Prateik Babbar, Aditya Pancholi, Rana Daggubati, Deepika Padukone | Thriller | Fox Star Studios, Ramesh Sippy Entertainment, Loverture Films, Cheyenne Enterprises | |
| A P R | 22 | Zokkomon | Satyajit Bhatkal | Darsheel Safary, Anupam Kher, Manjari Phadnis | Superhero/Children | Walt Disney Pictures | |
| A P R | 28 | Shor in the City | Raj Nidimoru, Krishna Dk | Tusshar Kapoor, Preeti Desai, Alok Chaturvedi | Drama/Cult | Balaji Motion Pictures, ALT Entertainment | |
| A P R | 29 | Chalo Dilli | Shashant Shah | Lara Dutta, Vinay Pathak, Akshay Kumar | Comedy Road movie | Eros International, Big Daddy Productions, Bheegi Basanti Entertainment | |
| A P R | 29 | I Am | Onir | Sanjay Suri, Radhika Apte, Shernaz Patel, Anurag Kashyap, Pooja Gandhi, Rahul Bose, Arjun Mathur, Abhimanyu Shekhar Singh, Nandita Das, Juhi Chawla, Manisha Koirala, Purab Kohli | Social/Drama | Anticlock Films | |
| A P R | 29 | Naughty @ 40 | Jagmohan Mundhra | Govinda, Yuvika Chaudhary, Anupam Kher, Shakti Kapoor | Comedy | | |
| M A Y | 6 | Luv Ka The End | Bumpy | Shraddha Kapoor, Taaha Shah | Teen/Comedy | Y-Films | |
| M A Y | 6 | Haunted – 3D | Vikram Bhatt | Mahakshay Chakraborty, Twinkle Bajpai, Achint Kaur | Horror | DAR Motion Pictures, ASA Productions & Enterprises | |
| M A Y | 13 | Love U...Mr. Kalakaar! | S. Manasvi | Tusshar Kapoor, Amrita Rao, Kunal Kumar, Ram Kapoor, Kiran Kumar | Romance/Comedy | Rajshri Productions | |
| M A Y | 13 | Ragini MMS | Pawan Kripalani | Kainaz Motivala, Rajkummar Rao | Horror/Romance | Balaji Motion Pictures, ALT Entertainment, iRock Films | |
| M A Y | 13 | Shagird | Tigmanshu Dhulia | Nana Patekar, Zakir Hussain, Mohit Ahlawat, Rimi Sen, Anurag Kashyap | Action/Drama | Reliance Entertainment, Fairzee Production | |
| M A Y | 13 | Stanley Ka Dabba | Amole Gupte | Partho, Divya Dutta | Children | Fox Star Studios, Amole Gupte Cinema | |
| M A Y | 20 | 404 | Prawaal Raman | Rajvvir Aroraa, Imaad Shah, Nishikant Kamat | Psychological thriller | | |
| M A Y | 20 | Crackers | Anil Goyal | Nikhil Dwivedi, Smilie Suri | Animation | | |
| M A Y | 20 | Pyaar Ka Punchnama | Luv Ranjan | Kartik Aaryan, Raayo S. Bakhirta, Divyendu Sharma, Sonnalli Seygall, Nushrat Bharucha, Ishita Raj Sharma | Romance/Comedy | Viacom18 Motion Pictures, Wide Frame Pictures | |
| M A Y | 27 | Kucch Luv Jaisaa | Barnali Ray Shukla | Rahul Bose, Shefali Shah, Om Puri, Neetu Chandra, Sumeet Raghavan | Drama/Comedy | | |
| J U N | 3 | Ready | Anees Bazmee | Salman Khan, Asin, Paresh Rawal, Mahesh Manjrekar, Sanjay Dutt, Ajay Devgn, Kangana Ranaut, Chunky Pandey, Arbaaz Khan, Zareen Khan | Comedy | T-Series Films, Sohail Khan Productions, One Up Entertainment, Rawail Grandsons Entertainment & Software, Wave Cinemas | |
| J U N | 10 | Shaitan | Bejoy Nambiar | Rajeev Khandelwal, Kalki Koechlin, Shiv Panditt | Drama/Thriller | Viacom18 Motion Pictures, Tipping Point Films, Anurag Kashyap Films, Getaway Pictures, Bohra Bros | |
| J U N | 17 | Bheja Fry 2 | Sagar Ballary | Vinay Pathak, Minissha Lamba, Amit Behl, Kay Kay Menon, Rahul Singh, Amole Gupte | Comedy | | |
| J U N | 17 | Always Kabhi Kabhi | Roshan Abbas | Ali Fazal, Giselli Monteiro, Zoa Morani, Satyajeet Dubey, Satish Shah, Lilette Dubey, Shah Rukh Khan | Romance/Teen | Eros International, Red Chillies Entertainment | |
| J U N | 17 | Bhindi Baazaar Inc. | Ankush Bhatt | Kay Kay Menon, Piyush Mishra, Deepti Naval, Prashant Narayanan, Shilpa Shukla | Thriller | | |
| J U N | 17 | Bin Bulaye Baraati | Chandrakant Singh | Mallika Sherawat, Rati Agnihotri, Gulshan Grover, Manoj Joshi, Shakti Kapoor, Priyanka Kothari, Johnny Lever, Sanjay Mishra, Om Puri, Vijay Raaz, Aftab Shivdasani | Crime | | |
| J U N | 24 | Double Dhamaal | Indra Kumar | Sanjay Dutt, Arshad Warsi, Javed Jaffrey, Riteish Deshmukh, Aashish Chaudhary, Mallika Sherawat, Kangana Ranaut | Comedy | Reliance Entertainment, Maruti Pictures | |

== July – September ==
| Opening | | Title | Director | Cast | Genre | Studio | Ref |
|---|---|---|---|---|---|---|---|
| J U L | 1 | Bbuddah... Hoga Terra Baap | Puri Jagannadh | Amitabh Bachchan, Hema Malini, Sonu Sood, Prakash Raj, Raveena Tandon, Charmy Kaur, Sonal Chauhan | Action | Viacom18 Motion Pictures, AB Corp | |
| J U L | 1 | Delhi Belly | Abhinay Deo | Imran Khan, Shenaz Treasurywala, Poorna Jagannathan, Rahul Pendkalkar, Vir Das, Vijay Raaz, Aamir Khan | Action/Comedy | UTV Motion Pictures, Aamir Khan Productions | |
| J U L | 8 | Murder 2 | Mohit Suri | Emraan Hashmi, Jacqueline Fernandez, Prashant Narayanan, Yana Gupta | Psychological thriller | Vishesh Films | |
| J U L | 8 | Chillar Party | Vikas Bahl, Nitesh Tiwari | Irrfan Khan, Sanath Menon, Rohan Grover, Naman Jain, Aarav Khanna, Vishesh Tiwari, Aakash Dahiya, Pankaj Tripathi, Rajesh Sharma, Ranbir Kapoor, Shriya Sharma, Swara Bhaskar | Children | UTV Spotboy, Salman Khan Being Human Productions, Phantom Films | |
| J U L | 15 | Zindagi Na Milegi Dobara | Zoya Akhtar | Hrithik Roshan, Abhay Deol, Farhan Akhtar, Katrina Kaif, Kalki Koechlin | Romance/Road | Eros International, Excel Entertainment | |
| J U L | 22 | Singham | Rohit Shetty | Ajay Devgn, Kajal Aggarwal, Murli Sharma, Prakash Raj | Action | Reliance Entertainment | |
| J U L | 29 | Khap | Ajai Sinha | Om Puri, Govind Namdev, Manoj Pahwa, Yuvika Chaudhary, Mohnish Bahl | Social | | |
| J U L | 29 | Gandhi to Hitler | Rakesh Ranjan Kumar | Neha Dhupia, Raghubir Yadav | Biographical | | |
| J U L | 29 | Bubble Gum | Sanjivan Lal | Sohail Lakhani, Apoorva Arora, Sachin Khedekar, Tanvi Azmi | Drama | | |
| A U G | 5 | Chala Mussaddi... Office Office | Rajiv Mehra | Pankaj Kapur, Deven Bhojani, Manoj Pahwa, Sanjay Mishra, Hemant Pandey, Asawari Joshi, Gaurav Kapoor, Farida Jalal, Makrand Deshpande | Comedy/Social | | |
| A U G | 5 | I Am Kalam | Nila Madhab Panda | Harsh Mayar, Gulshan Grover | Drama | | |
| A U G | 5 | Milta Hai Chance By Chance | Ramesh Modi | Gracy Singh, Aslam Khan, Vishal Kaushik, Sana Govi, Reshma Modi, Mahesh Thakur | Comedy/Romance | | |
| A U G | 5 | Aagaah: The Warning | Karan Razdan | Jannat Zubair Rahmani, Atul Kulkarni, Rituparna Sengupta, Anupam Kher, Satish Kaushik, Ila Arun | Horror | | |
| A U G | 12 | Aarakshan | Prakash Jha | Amitabh Bachchan, Saif Ali Khan, Manoj Bajpai, Deepika Padukone, Prateik Babbar | Social | Reliance Entertainment, Base Industries Group, Prakash Jha Productions | |
| A U G | 12 | Phhir | Girish Dhamija | Rajneesh Duggal, Adah Sharma, Roshni Chopra | Thriller | Reliance Entertainment, ASA Productions & Enterprises | |
| A U G | 19 | Chatur Singh Two Star | Ajay Chandok | Sanjay Dutt, Ameesha Patel, Suresh Menon | Comedy | | |
| A U G | 19 | Not a Love Story | Ram Gopal Varma | Mahie Gill, Deepak Dobriyal, Ajay Gehi | Crime | | |
| A U G | 19 | Sahi Dhandhe Galat Bande | Parvin Dabas | Parvin Dabas, Sharat Saxena, Vansh Bharadwaj, Anupam Kher, Ashish Nayyar, Kuldip Ruhil | Comedy | | |
| A U G | 26 | Chitkabrey – Shades of Grey | Suneet Arora | Ravi Kissen, Rahul Singh, Rajesh Shringapure, Sanjay Swaraj, Akshay Singh, Bobby Vats, Divya Dwivedi | Social | | |
| A U G | 26 | Shabri | Lalit Marathe | Isha Koppikar | Action | | |
| A U G | 26 | Yeh Dooriyan | Deepshika | Deepshika, Kaishav Arora | Romance | | |
| A U G | 31 | Bodyguard | Siddique | Salman Khan, Kareena Kapoor, Sharat Saxena, Hazel Keech | Romance/Action | Reliance Entertainment, Reel Life Production | |
| A U G | 31 | Mummy Punjabi | Pammi Somal | Kirron Kher, Jackie Shroff, Divya Dutta | Comedy | | |
| S E P | 2 | That Girl in Yellow Boots | Anurag Kashyap | Kalki Koechlin, Naseeruddin Shah | Social | Viacom18 Motion Pictures, Tipping Point Films, Anurag Kashyap Films, NFDC, Sikhya Entertainment | |
| S E P | 9 | Mere Brother Ki Dulhan | Ali Abbas Zafar | Katrina Kaif, Imran Khan, Ali Zafar, Tara D'Souza, Parikshit Sahni, Kanwaljit Singh, Suparna Marwah, Mohammed Zeeshan Ayyub | Romance/Comedy | Yash Raj Films | |
| S E P | 16 | Rivaaz | Ashok Nanda | Deepti Naval, Reema Lagoo, Meghna Naidu | Social | | |
| S E P | 23 | Mausam | Pankaj Kapoor | Shahid Kapoor, Sonam Kapoor, Ankit Mohan, Anupam Kher, Wamiqa Gabbi | Romance | Eros International, Vistaar Religare Film Fund, Cinergy, Seasons of Love | |
| S E P | 23 | U R My Jaan | Aron Govil | Mikaal Zulfikaar, Priti Soni, Aman Verma | Romance | | |
| S E P | 30 | Force | Nishikant Kamat | John Abraham, Vidyut Jammwal, Genelia D'Souza, Mohnish Bahl, Raj Babbar | Action | Fox Star Studios, Sunshine Pictures | |
| S E P | 30 | Hum Tum Shabana | Sagar Ballary | Tusshar Kapoor, Shreyas Talpade, Minnisha Lamba | Romance/Comedy | Alliance Entertainment, Horseshoe Pictures | |
| S E P | 30 | Saheb, Biwi Aur Gangster | Tigmanshu Dhulia | Jimmy Sheirgill, Mahie Gill, Randeep Hooda | Action/Thriller | BrandSmith Motion Pictures, Bohra Bros, Tigmanshu Dhulia Films | |
| S E P | 30 | Tere Mere Phere | Deepa Sahi | Vinay Pathak, Riya Sen, Jagrat Desai, Sasha Goradia | Romantic/Comedy | | |
| S E P | 30 | Chargesheet | Dev Anand | Dev Anand, Jackie Shroff, Naseeruddin Shah, Divya Dutta | Drama/Thriller | | |
| S E P | 30 | Na Jaane Kabse Hum Hi | Pammi Somal | Garry Gill, Amrita Prakash, Sharat Saxena, Gurpreet Ghuggi, Lilette Dubey, Javed Sheikh | Romance | | |

== October – December ==
| Opening | | Title | Director | Cast | Genre | Studio | Ref |
|---|---|---|---|---|---|---|---|
| O C T | 6 | Rascals | David Dhawan | Ajay Devgn, Arjun Rampal, Kangana Ranaut, Lisa Haydon, Sanjay Dutt | Comedy/Action | Eros International, Sanjay Dutt Productions, Rupali Aum Entertainment, Venus Worldwide Entertainment | |
| O C T | 7 | Love Breakups Zindagi | Sahil Sangha | Zayed Khan, Dia Mirza, Cyrus Sahukar, Tisca Chopra, Satyadeep Mishra, Auritra Ghosh, Pallavi Sharda | Romantic | Sahara Motion Pictures, Born Free Entertainment | |
| O C T | 14 | My Friend Pinto | Raghav Dar | Prateik Babbar, Kalki Koechlin, Arjun Mathur, Shruti Seth, Makarand Deshpande, Rajendranath Zutshi, Divya Dutta | Romance/Comedy/Crime | UTV Motion Pictures, Sanjay Leela Bhansali Films | |
| O C T | 14 | Mujhse Fraaandship Karoge | Nupur Asthana | Saqib Saleem, Saba Azad, Nishant Dahiya, Tara D'Souza, Harsh Nagar | Comedy/Romance | Y-Films | |
| O C T | 14 | Mod | Nagesh Kukunoor | Ayesha Takia, Rannvijay Singh, Raghubir Yadav, Tanvi Azmi, Anant Mahadevan | Romance/Drama | Shreya Entertainment, Kukunoor Movies | |
| O C T | 14 | Aazaan | Prashant Chadha | Sachiin J. Joshi, Candice Boucher, Aarya Babbar, Dalip Tahil | Action/Thriller | | |
| O C T | 20 | Oh God! Saare Hain Fraud | Ashu Trikha | Shreyas Talpade, Mugdha Godse, Johnny Lever | Comedy | | |
| O C T | 26 | Ra.One | Anubhav Sinha | Shah Rukh Khan, Kareena Kapoor, Dalip Tahil, Arjun Rampal, Shahana Goswami, Sanjay Dutt, Ben Hawkey, Priyanka Chopra | Action/Sci-Fi | Red Chillies Entertainment | |
| O C T | 27 | Tell Me O Kkhuda | Hema Malini | Esha Deol, Vinod Khanna, Rishi Kapoor, Arjan Bajwa, Dharmendra, Salman Khan | Drama | | |
| O C T | 27 | Damadamm! | Swapna Waghmare | Himesh Reshammiya, Purbi Joshi, Sonal Sehgal | Comedy | | |
| N O V | 4 | Loot | Rajneesh Thakur | Govinda, Suniel Shetty, Jaaved Jaaferi, Mahaakshay Chakraborty, Rakhi Sawant, Shweta Bhardwaj | Comedy | Viacom18 Motion Pictures, Popcorn Motion Pictures | |
| N O V | 4 | Miley Naa Miley Hum | Tanveer Khan | Chirag Paswan, Kangana Ranaut, Kunal Kumar, Neeru Bajwa, Sagarika Ghatge, Kabir Bedi, Dalip Tahil, Poonam Dhillon | Romance/Drama | | |
| N O V | 11 | Rockstar | Imtiaz Ali | Ranbir Kapoor, Nargis Fakhri, Aakash Dahiya, Jaideep Ahlawat, Sanjana Sanghi, Aditi Rao Hydari, Kumud Mishra, Piyush Mishra, Shammi Kapoor | Romance/Drama | Shree Ashtavinayak Cine Vision, Shree Ashtavinayak LFS Infra, Eros International | |
| N O V | 15 | Super K – The Movie | Vijay S. Bhanushali; Smita Maroo | | Animation | | |
| N O V | 18 | Shakal Pe Mat Ja | Shubh Mukherjee | Shubh Mukherjee, Pratik Katare, Saurabh Shukla, Raghubir Yadav, Aamna Sharif, Zakir Hussain | Comedy | | |
| N O V | 25 | Desi Boyz | Rohit Dhawan | Akshay Kumar, John Abraham, Sanjay Dutt, Deepika Padukone, Chitrangada Singh, Mohnish Bahl, Anupam Kher, Omi Vaidya, Ashwin Mushran, Rajat Barmecha, Bruna Abdullah | Comedy | Eros International, Next Gen Films | |
| D E C | 2 | The Dirty Picture | Milan Luthria | Vidya Balan, Naseeruddin Shah, Emraan Hashmi, Tusshar Kapoor | Drama | Balaji Motion Pictures, ALT Entertainment | |
| D E C | 2 | I Am Singh | Puneet Issar | Gulzar Inder Chahal, Rizwan Haider, Amy Rasimas, Puneet Issar, Brooke Johnston, Tulip Joshi, Mike Singh, Yusuf Hussain, Neetha Mohindra, Kavi Raz, Donny Kapoor | Action/Crime/Drama | | |
| D E C | 9 | Ladies vs Ricky Bahl | Maneesh Sharma | Ranveer Singh, Anushka Sharma, Parineeti Chopra, Dipannita Sharma, Aditi Sharma | Romance/Comedy/Crime | Yash Raj Films | |
| D E C | 16 | Jo Hum Chahein | Pawan Gill | Sunny Gill, Simran Mundi, Achint Kaur, Alyy Khan, Yuri Suri, Samar Virmani, Mansi Multani, Rithvik Dhanjani | Romance/Drama | | |
| D E C | 16 | Pappu Can't Dance Saala | Saurabh Shukla | Vinay Pathak, Neha Dhupia, Rajat Kapoor, Naseeruddin Shah, Sanjay Mishra, Saurabh Shukla, Brijendra Kala, Anand Abhyankar | Romance/Comedy | | |
| D E C | 23 | Don 2 | Farhan Akhtar | Shah Rukh Khan, Priyanka Chopra, Lara Dutta, Boman Irani, Kunal Kapoor, Hrithik Roshan, Om Puri, Alyy Khan | Action/Thriller | Reliance Entertainment, Excel Entertainment, Red Chillies Entertainment, Film Base Berlin, Medienboard Berlin-Brandenburg, Deutscher Filmförderfonds | |

== See also ==
- List of Hindi films of 2012
- List of Hindi films of 2010
