= Prabal Panjabi =

Indian actor

- Education: Delhi Public School, Noida, India
- Occupation: Actor
- Years active: 2011–2020

Prabal Panjabi is an Indian actor who appears in Bollywood films. In 2011, Panjabi made his debut in Y Films' Mujhse Fraaandship Karoge, and Mere Dad Ki Maruti (2013).

== Career ==
Prior to his film debut, Panjabi acted in Disney's television series Kya Mast Hai Life (2009–2010). He also did few TVCs and short films.

Recently he appeared in the Sci fi movie Cargo.

== Filmography ==
Year	Film	Role	Notes
2011	Mujhse Fraaandship Karoge	Hacky	
2013	Mere Dad Ki Maruti	Gattu	
2013	Shahid	Omar Sheikh	
2015	Hamari Adhuri Kahani	Apurva	
2017	Meri Pyaari Bindu	Ayushmann's Friend	
2019	Cargo	Bhavesh Joshi	

=== Television ===
Year	Serial	Role	Channel
2009	Kya Mast Hai Life	Jango	Disney Channel India
2013–present	Teenovation	himself	ZeeQ
2018–present	Weekends	Kevin Tyagi	The Viral Fever
2020	Four More Shots Please!	Amit Mishra	Amazon Prime Video

== See also ==
- List of Indian film actors
