= Aditi Singh Sharma =

Indian playback singer

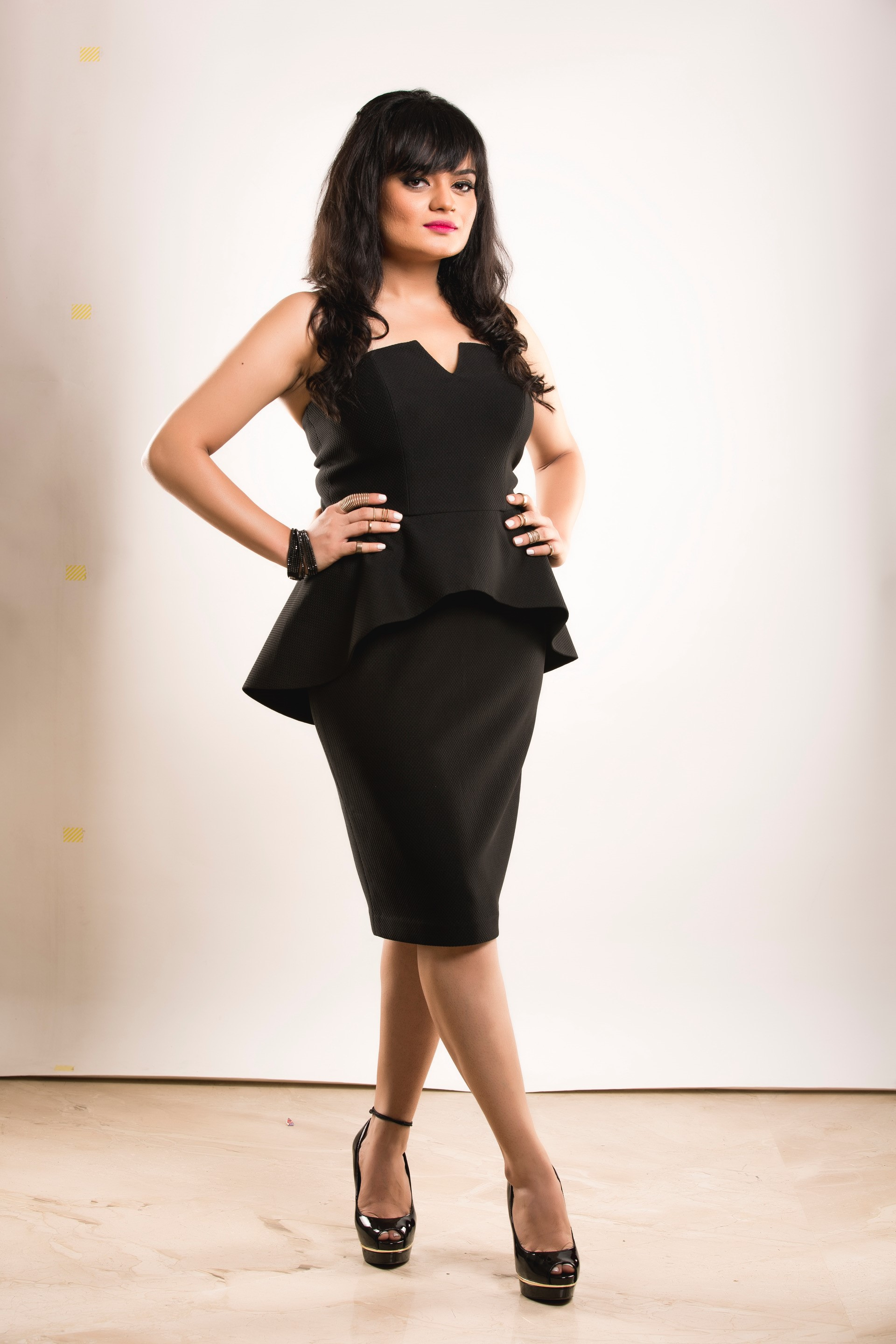

Background information
- Born: June 2, 1986 (age 40); New Delhi, India
- Genre: Film
- Occupation: Singer
- Instruments: Vocals, Keyboards

Aditi Singh Sharma (born 2 June 1986) is an Indian playback singer who sings in Hindi, Bengali, and Telugu.

In 2009, she made her playback singing debut in Bollywood with Anurag Kashyap's Dev.D.

Sharma is also known for her work in movies like No One Killed Jessica, Dhoom 3, 2 States, Agent Vinod, and Heroine.

== Career ==
After her debut with the Hindi song "Yahi Meri Zindagi" for the movie Dev.D, Sharma's career expanded to other Indian languages, with “Ra Ra Rowdy” and “Miami” in Telugu, and “Nachle re Moyena", "Ami Jani", "Premer Infection", and “Ure Ure Mon” in Bengali.

Sharma has performed in live concerts, and appeared on music channels like MTV Coke Studio, MTV Unplugged, and Gaan Bangla TV.

In 2013, Sharma performed on MTV Coke Studio, singing Ram Sampath’s rendition of "Sundari Komola".

In 2020, she performed “Mor Bhabona Re", a Rabindra Sangeet, on the Bangladeshi music platform Wind Of Change.

== Playback singing ==
Year	Movie	Song	Music	Lyrics	Co-singer(s)	Language
2009	Dev.D	"Yahi Meri Zindagi"	Amit Trivedi	Amitabh Bhattacharya		Hindi
2010	Admissions Open	"Meri Rooh"	Amit Trivedi	Shellee		Hindi
2010	The Film Emotional Atyachar	"Chitka Hua"	Mangesh Dhadke	Amitabh Bhattacharya		Hindi
2010	A Flat	"Dil Kashi"	Bappi Lahiri	Virag Mishra	Sonu Nigam, Tulsi Kumar, Raja Hasan	Hindi
2010	A Flat	"Dil Kashi" (Version 2)	Bappi Lahiri	Virag Mishra	Sonu Nigam, Raja Hasan	Hindi
2011	No One Killed Jessica	"Dilli"	Amit Trivedi	Amitabh Bhattacharya	Shriram Iyer, Tochi Raina	Hindi
2011	No One Killed Jessica	"Dilli" (Hardcore)	Amit Trivedi	Amitabh Bhattacharya	Shriram Iyer, Tochi Raina	Hindi
2011	No One Killed Jessica	"Aali Re"	Amit Trivedi	Amitabh Bhattacharya	Anushka Manchanda, Biswajit Chakraborty, Raja Hasan, Shriram Iyer, Sonika Sharma, Sonu Kakkar, Tochi Raina	Hindi
2011	Turning 30	"Turning 30!!!"	Siddharth-Suhas	Suhas		Hindi
2011	Turning 30	"Turning 30!!!" (Remix)	Siddharth-Suhas	Suhas		Hindi
2011	Game	"Kaun Hai Ajnabi"	Shankar–Ehsaan–Loy	Javed Akhtar	KK	Hindi
2011	Game	"Kaun Hai Ajnabi" (Remix)	Shankar–Ehsaan–Loy	Javed Akhtar	KK	Hindi
2011	Luv Ka The End	"Luv Ka The End"	Ram Sampath	Amitabh Bhattacharya		Hindi
2011	Luv Ka The End	"Freak Out"	Ram Sampath	Amitabh Bhattacharya	Joi Barua	Hindi
2011	Always Kabhi Kabhi	"Undi The Condi"	Pritam	Irfan Siddiqui	Shaan	Hindi
2011	Mere Brother Ki Dulhan	"Choomantar	Sohail Sen	Irshad Kamil	Benny Dayal	Hindi
2011	Mere Brother Ki Dulhan	"Choomantar"(Remix)	Sohail Sen	Irshad Kamil	Benny Dayal	Hindi
2011	Mujhse Fraaandship Karoge	"Dheaon Dheaon"	Raghu Dixit	Anvita Dutt	Vishal Dadlani, Machas with Attitude (rap)	Hindi
2011	Mujhse Fraaandship Karoge	"Dheaon Dheaon" (The Seeti Seeti Bang Bang Mix)	Raghu Dixit	Anvita Dutt	Vishal Dadlani	Hindi
2011	Jo Dooba So Paar It's Love in Bihar!	"Saaley"	Manish J. Tipu	Shellee		Hindi
2011	Damadamm!	"Madhushala"	Himesh Reshammiya	Sachin Gupta	Himesh Reshammiya	Hindi
2011	Damadamm!	"Mango"	Himesh Reshammiya	Sameer	Himesh Reshammiya	Hindi
2012	Agent Vinod	"I'll Do The Talking Tonight"	Pritam	Amitabh Bhattacharya	Neeraj Shridhar, Shefali Alvares, Barbie Amod	Hindi
2012	Agent Vinod	"I'll Do The Talking Tonight" (Remix)	Pritam	Amitabh Bhattacharya	Neeraj Shridhar, Barbie Amod	Hindi
2012	Agent Vinod	"Raabta – Night in a Motel"	Pritam	Amitabh Bhattacharya	Arijit Singh	Hindi
2012	Vicky Donor	"Rokda"	Abhishek-Akshay	Akshay Verma		Hindi
2012	Vicky Donor	"Kho Jaane De"	Rochak Kohli	Juhi Chaturvedi	Clinton Cerejo	Hindi
2012	Heroine	"Main Heroine Hoon"	Salim–Sulaiman	Sanjay Chhel		Hindi
2013	John Day	"Kis Lamhe Mein" (Female)	Kshitij Tarey	Sayeed Quadri		Hindi
2013	Gori Tere Pyaar Mein	"Dhat Teri Ki"	Vishal–Shekhar	Kumaar	Sanam Puri	Hindi
2013	Dhoom 3	"Dhoom Machale Dhoom"	Pritam	Sameer		Hindi
2013	Dhoom 3	"Kamli (Dubstep Mix)"	Pritam	Amitabh Bhattacharya		Hindi
2014	Darr @ The Mall	"Pinacolada"	Shankar–Ehsaan–Loy	Amitabh Bhattacharya	Neeti Mohan	Hindi
2014	Bewakoofiyaan	"Gulcharrey"	Raghu Dixit	Anvita Dutt	Benny Dayal	Hindi
2014	2 States	"Offo"	Shankar–Ehsaan–Loy	Amitabh Bhattacharya		Hindi
2014	Holiday: A Soldier Is Never Off Duty	"Blame The Night"	Pritam	Irshad Kamil	Arijit Singh, Piyush Kapoor	Hindi
2014	Roar	"Rubaru"	John Stewart Eduri	Irfan Siddiqui		Hindi
2014	Rowdy Fellow	"Ra Ra Rowdy"	Sunny M.R.	Krishna Chaitanya		Telugu
2015	Alone	"Touch My Body"	Raghav Sachar	Kumaar		Hindi
2015	Roy	"Sooraj Dooba Hain"	Amaal Mallik	Kumaar	Arijit Singh	Hindi
2015	Roy	"Sooraj Dooba Hain (Version 2)"	Amaal Mallik	Kumaar	Arijit Singh	Hindi
2015	Bangistan	"Saturday Night"	Ram Sampath	Puneet Krishna	Neeraj Shridhar, Benny Dayal, Janusz Krucinski	Hindi
2015	Calendar Girls	"Shaadi Wali Night"	Amaal Mallik	Kumaar		Hindi
2016	Teraa Surroor	"Bekhudi"	Himesh Reshammiya	Shabbir Ahmed	Darshan Raval	Hindi
2016	Love Shagun	"Hichkiyaan"	Ashish Pandit		Bob (Rap)	Hindi
2016	Ki & Ka	"High Heels"	Meet Bros, Yo Yo Honey Singh	Kumaar, Alfaaz	Jaz Dhami, Yo Yo Honey Singh	Hindi
2016	Azhar	"Oye Oye"	DJ Chetas	Anand Bakshi	Armaan Malik	Hindi
2016	Befikra	"Befikra"	Meet Bros	Kumaar	Meet Bros	Hindi
2016	Dishoom	"Sau Tarah Ke (Revisited)"	Pritam	Mayur Puri	Abhijeet Sawant	Hindi
2016	Force 2	"Rang Laal"	Gourov-Roshin	Kumaar	Dev Negi, John Abraham	Hindi
2017	Commando 2	"Commando (Title Track)"	Mannan Shaah	Kumaar		Hindi
2017	Commando 2	"Commando (English)"	Mannan Shaah	Kumaar		Hindi
2017	Naam Shabana	"Dil Hua Besharam"	Meet Bros	Kumaar		Hindi
2017	Golmaal Again	"Golmaal Title Track"	S. Thaman	Kumaar	Brijesh Shandilya	Hindi
2017	Golmaal Again	"Itna Sannat Kyun Hai"	Lijo George-DJ Chetas	Kumaar	Amit Mishra	Hindi
2017	Simran	"Meet (Female Version)"	Sachin–Jigar	Priya Saraiya		Hindi
2018	Jole Jongole	"Premer Infection (Dil Ki Kite)"	Jeet Gannguli	Rana Mazumder	Neeraj Shridhar	Bengali
2018	Bizli	"Ure Ure Mon"	Akassh	Priyo Chattopadhay	Akassh	Bengali
2018	Chal Mohan Ranga	"Miami"	S. Thaman	Neeraja Kona	Manisha Eerabathini	Telugu
2018	Veere Di Wedding	"Veere"	Vishal Mishra	Anvita Dutt Guptan	Vishal Mishra, Dhvani Bhanushali, Nikita Ahuja, Payal Dev, Iulia Vantur, Sharvi Yadav	Hindi
2018	Nawabzaade	"High Rated Gabru" (Female Version)	Guru Randhawa			Hindi
2018	AAJA MAHI VE (Single)	"AAJA MAHI VE"	Bawa - Gulzar			Hindi
2019	Total Dhamaal	"Speaker Phat Jaaye"	Gourov-Roshin	Kumaar	Harrdy Sandhu, Abuzar Akhtar, Jonita Gandhi	Hindi
2019	DASS JA KASOOR (Single)	"DASS JA KASOOR"	Bawa - Gulzar	Gulzar Sahni		Hindi
2019	KHWAABDAANI (Single)	"KHWAABDAANI"	Aditi Singh Sharma	Siddhant Kaushal		Hindi
2020	Kangna Lede (Single)	"Kangna Lede"	Aditi Singh Sharma	Kumaar		Hindi
2021	Time to Dance	"Aaye Haaye"	Vishal Mishra	Kumar	Vishal Mishra, Millind Gaba	Hindi
2021	Rohingya	"Sarhadein"	Prateek Gandhi	Anil Jeengar	Prateek Gandhi	Hindi
2022	Rashtra Kavach Om	“Seher (Female Version)	Arko Pravo Mukherjee	A. M. Turaz		Hindi
2022	Atithi Bhooto Bhava	"Udd Raha Hai Dil"	Prasad S	Shakeel Azmi	Raghav Chaitanya	Hindi
2022	Me Nahi Mhantana (Album)	"Me Nahi Mhantana"	Amey Londhe		Vidyadhar Bhav	Hindi
2022	Chand Ka Tukda (Single)	"Chand Ka Tukda"		Amitaabh Bhattacharya		Hindi
2022	Pipra Bole Koto Jol (Single)	"Pipra Bole Koto Jol"				Bengali
2023	Bad Boy	"Insta Vich Story"	Himesh Reshammiya	Kumaar	Himesh Reshammiya, Asees Kaur	Hindi
2023	Zindagi Kashmakash	ZINDAGI KASHMAKASH	Manish Sahriya	Nirnimesh Dube	Shaan, Parul Mishra	Hindi
2023	Love Kardi (Single)	"Love Kardi"	Yug Bhusal	Himanshu Kohli		Hindi
2023	Faasle (Single)	"Faasle"	Yug Bhusal	Himanshu Kohli		Hindi
2023	Pull the Trigger (Album)	"Pull the Trigger"			Darth_Sids, Mc SU	Hindi
2023	Tu Haske Bulale (Single)	"Tu Haske Bulale"	Rahul Jain, Nishad Bhatt	Amit Deep Sharma	Rahul Jain	Hindi
2023	Jaane Kyun (Single)	"Jaane Kyun"	Reena Gilbert			Hindi
2023	Aisi Jagah (Single)	"Aisi Jagah"	Prateek Gandhi			Hindi
2023	Ami Jani (Single)	"Ami Jani"	Hridoy Khan	Farhana Chowdhury Hema	Hridoy Khan	Bengali
2023	Naachle Re Moyena (Single)	"Naachle Re Moyena"	Dabbu	Ritam Sen		Bengali
2023	Chugliyaan (Single)	"Chugliyaan"	Yug Bhusal	Himanshu Kohli		Hindi
2023	Saathiya (Single)	"Saathiya "	Yug Bhusal	Himanshu Kohli		Hindi
2023	Baatein Teri (Single)	"Baatein Teri"	Yug Bhusal	Himanshu Kohli		Hindi
2023	Tera Nasha (Single)	"Tera Nasha"	Yug Bhusal	Himanshu Kohli		Hindi
2023	Meri Maa (Single)	"Meri Maa"	Yug Bhusal	Himanshu Kohli		
2023	Raaste (Single)	"Raaste"		Priya Saraiya		
2024	Bajao Gaana Zorse (Single)	"Bajao Gaana Zorse"	Vivek Kar	Kumaar	Dev Negi, Jaan Kumar Sanu, Harmaan Nazim, Biswajit Mahapatra, Riya Bhattacharya, Srishti Bhandari, Plabita Hazarika	Hindi
2024	Binny And Family	"Shake the Body"	Lalit Pandit	Alok Ranjan Jha & Lalit Pandit		Hindi
2024	Gaa Ke Sunau (Single)	"Gaa Ke Sunau"	Prateek Gandhi	Aniket Shukla		Hindi
2024	Dil Awaara		Sunny Inder	Kumaar		Hindi
2024	Thukraaya Kyun (Single)		Aditi Singh Sharma	Siddhant Kaushal		Hindi
2024	Karz (Single)		Aditi Singh Sharma	Manoj Yadav		Hindi
2025	Badass Ravi Kumar	Tandoori Days	Himesh Reshammiya	Himesh Reshammiya	Himesh Reshammiya	Hindi
2025	Badass Ravi Kumar	"Medley"	Himesh Reshammiya	Himesh Reshammiya, Shabbir Ahmed, Sameer Anjaan	Himesh Reshammiya, Aditi Singh Sharma, Shreya Ghoshal, Salman Ali, Jyotica Tangri, Nitn Kumar, Sachin Valmiki, Nishta Sharma, Ankona Mukherjee, Arunita Kanjilal, Kavya Limaye	Hindi

== Unplugged Songs ==
Unplugged Song	Film
Aankhon Me Teri	Om Shanti Om
Apna Time Aayega	Gully Boy
Kalank (Title Track)	Kalank

== Accolades ==
Year	Award Ceremony	Category	Film	Song	Result	Reference(s)
2009	Mirchi Music Awards	Upcoming Female Vocalist of The Year	Dev.D	"Yahi Meri Zindagi"	Won	
