= Joi Barua =

Indian singer and music composer

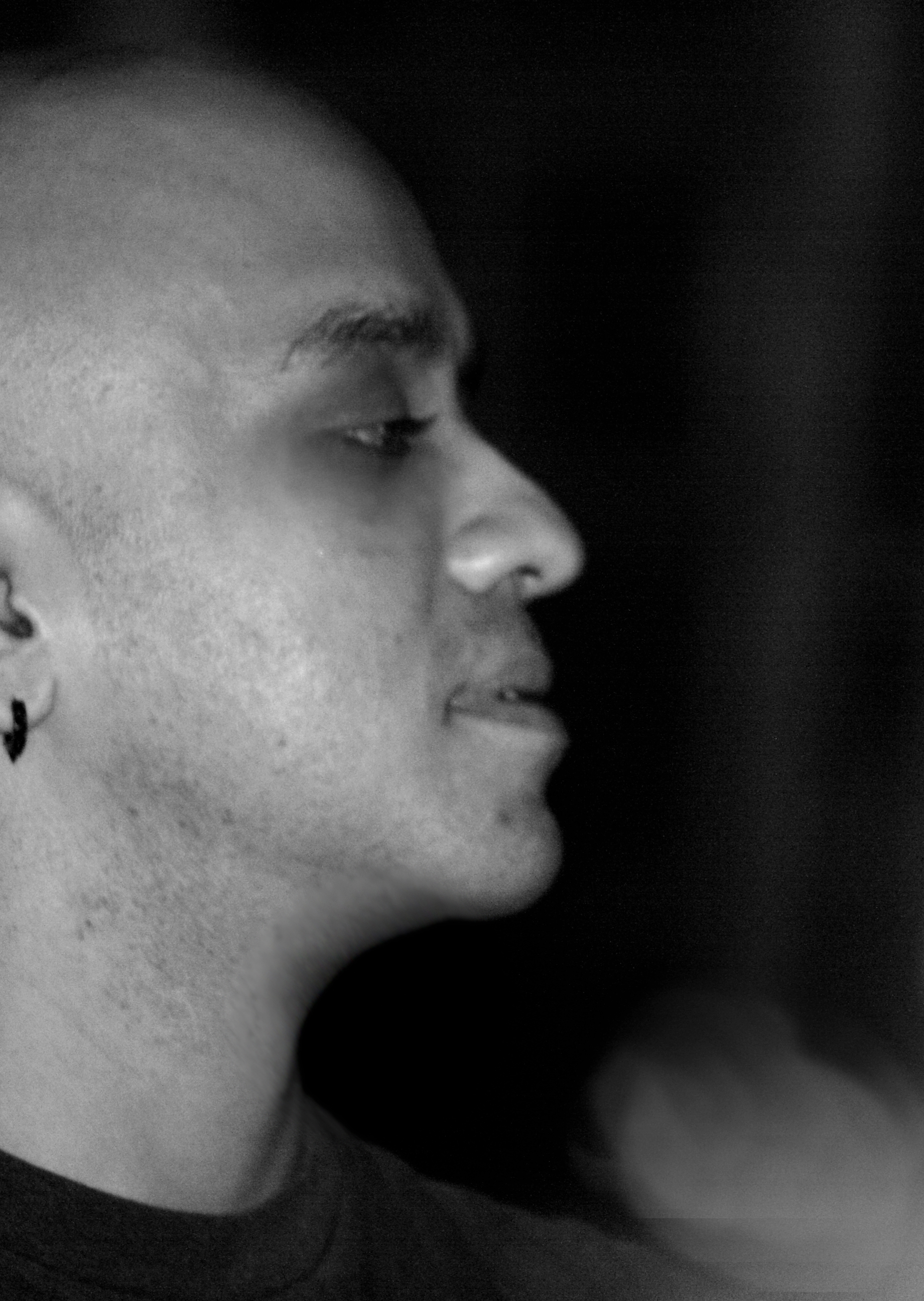
- Joi Barua, 2010

Background information
- Born: Jayanta Barua; Digboi, Assam, India
- Genres: Rock, soul, worldbeat
- Occupations: Vocalist, musician, music composer
- Instruments: Vocals, guitar, violin, keyboards
- Years active: 2005

Joi Barua (Note: Assamese pronunciation: [d͡ʒɔj bɔɹua].) (Assamese pronunciation: [d͡ʒɔj bɔɹua]) is an Indian singer and music composer. Born in Digboi, Assam, he started his career by singing advertising jingles and later did playback singing for Hindi, Assamese and Telugu films. He is also the lead vocalist of the band Joi. Barua has a mixed musical style incorporating elements of rock, soul, jazz, folk and world music.

== Early life ==
Joi was born in Digboi, Assam, the younger of the two children to Ranjana Barua and Rohini Dhar Barua. His father gave him a violin when he was four years old and that triggered his lifelong passion for music. His family moved to Jorhat when he was in junior school. When he was seven years old, his sister pushed him to join a singing competition and taught him the popular Cliff Richard song 'Bachelor Boy'. Even though ignorant about singing at that age, he won the competition. It was a defining moment. His school principal, Sister Mabilia, understood his passion for music and since then she never missed an opportunity to encourage him into singing and taking part in stage acts. Her favourite was the Boney M song 'El Lute' -about a man wrongly imprisoned for a crime he did not commit- which he would often sing to her. He considers her as his first guru in life and a constant source of inspiration. At home, he and his cousin Piku would sing songs of The Beatles, The Eagles, Simon and Garfunkel, U2, etc. He passed out his high school from St. Anthony's College, Shillong, and later attended Gauhati Commerce College for graduation.

His personal inspirations include his father, who always encouraged him to take music out of classrooms into the hearts of people, and his ex-principal Sister Mabilia who guided his passion for music. His musical influences have been varied. It includes Sting, The Beatles, The Eagles, Iron Maiden, The Police, Ozzy Osbourne, Joe Satriani, Eric Clapton, U2, etc. Classical Composers like Beethoven, Rossini, Vivaldi and Mozart, and Indians musicians like L. Subramaniam, A.R. Rahman, Salil Chowdhury, Ilaiyaraaja, Bhupen Hazarika and Jayanta Hazarika also influenced him a lot.

== Career ==
Barua started his career by singing jingles for several advertising campaigns including Fiat Linea, Vodafone, Reliance, LG, Hero Honda, Nescafe, Club Mahindra, Yatra.com etc. Before starting playback singing, he worked as background singers for several Bollywood films in the early 2000s. His notable playback singing for Hindi films include Dev.D, Udaan, Luv Ka The End, Mujhse Fraaandship Karoge, Zindagi Na Milegi Dobara. In 2010, he recorded two songs for Telugu film Kalavar King. Joi Barua and his band created history atop the Rezang La War Memorial on May 4, 2022 when they released the anthem for the 114 bravehearts of the Indian Army who lost their lives here during the Indo-China War in 1962.

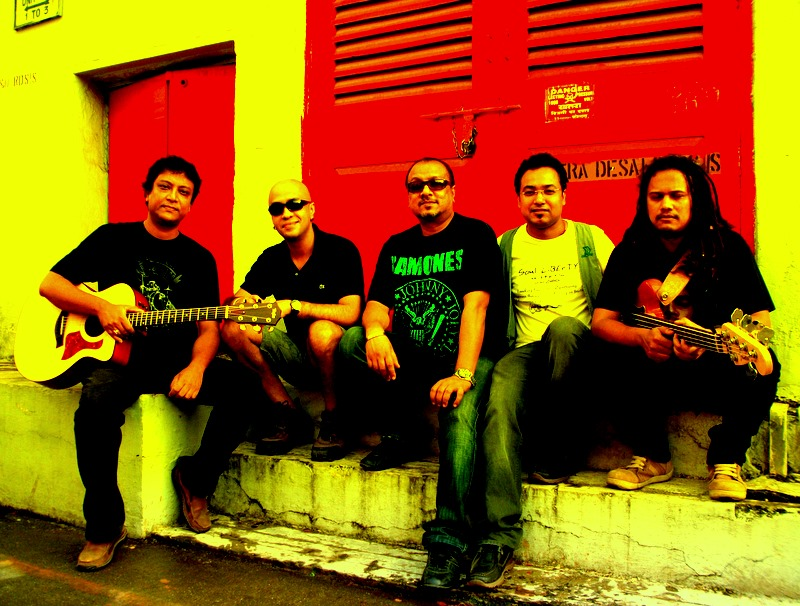
The band Joi, from left Pawan Rasaily, Joi Barua, Abani Tanti, Ibson Lal Baruah and Manas Chowdhary.

=== Albums and singles ===
Barua, along with his band mates of Joi, launched the album titled Joi: Looking out of the Window on 21 December 2010. The album contains 8 tracks and all of them features vocals of Barua. The songs are a blend of rock, soul, folk and worldbeat. The band also released the first music video filmed on Aikon Baaikon, a track from the album. Apart from Barua, the band members are Pawan Rasaily (lead guitar), Ibson Lal Baruah (rhythm guitar), Manas Chowdhary (bass guitar) and Partho Goswami (drums).

In 2011, he sang the Assamese song "Khiriki" for Hengool Theatre. In June 2013, Joi and his band released an Assamese single, Pitol Soku from the documentary Riders of the Mist. The documentary features the bareback jockeys of Jorhat and Sivasagar districts of the Assam and the song pays an homage to them. A blend of Rock and Worldbeat, the song and its promotional video was unveiled by John Abraham and Vishal Dadlani.

In 2014, he collaborated with Shruti Haasan and composed an Assamese-Tamil fusion song titled Prithibi Ghure and performed together in an INKtalks live event. The Tamil lyrics was penned by Kamal Haasan, while the Assamese lyrics were written by Ibson Lal Baruah.

Joi released a number of singles during 2016 and 2017, under the project name 'Pride'. These songs with their videos portrays stories from Assam. While 'Rabha' narrated an incident of the legendary Bishnu Rabha, collaborated with American saxophonist George Brooks, 'Na Jujor Ronuwa' stressed on the lesser-known, but the largest tribe within Assam, the Koch-Rajbongshi's.

'Aai O Aai' is a festive song released on 2025, featuring a collaboration with Lakhya . The track, with lyrics by Sagar Saurabh and music production by Pawan Rasaily, captures the essence of home and the colorful season, blending nostalgia with vibrant melodies.

=== Movies and documentaries ===
In 2015, Barua composed the track Dusokute for the film Margarita With A Straw. In the same year, Joi composed the songs & scored background music for a movie produced by John Abraham through John Abraham Entertainment Private Limited. The movie, titled 'Banana' was Directed by Sajid Ali.

In 2016, Joi released another single titled "Riders of the Mist" from the documentary by the same name. This song was launched first in the music channel VH1 and was then circulated online. Joi composed the background score for a short film Playing Priya and sang its title track with Jonita Gandhi. Titled "Meetha Zeher", the song comes in the end credits of the movie.

In 2018, Joi co-composed the music for the movie Laila Majnu along with Niladri Kumar. Written by Imtiaz Ali and Sajid Ali, the movie was directed by Sajid Ali.

Joi composed a song titled 'Subeh Dekh Li' for the Indian-American production The Illegal in 2019. Ankit Tiwari rendered his voice to the song.

=== International collaborations ===
Joi is the co-composer of the original songs for the Album 'Lim Fantasy of Companionship for Piano and Orchestra'. Conceptualized on an original story by Dr. Susan Lim and Christina Teenz Tan, this is a collaborative venture with musicians across continents. A conversation with Dr. Lim at an INK Talks conference in 2017 at Singapore, where Joi performed and showcased his song 'Rabha' for the first time led to the project. French musicians Manu Martin and Matthieu Eymard, along with Ron Danziger from Australia, co-composed the original songs that form the 21 vignettes of the thirty-three minute album.

Working towards a future musical told from the intersections of Science & Artificial Life, the music production has been centered around and recorded at Abbey Road Studios, London. London Symphony Orchestra, London Voices, Pianist Tedd Joselson and conductor Arthur Fagen, are the principal collaborators to this album.

== Awards and recognitions ==
List of awards and recognitions received
Year	Award	Category	Work	Notes
2010	Best Debut Award	–	Joi - Looking Out of the Window	Awarded at the Big Music Awards by Big 92.7 FM, Guwahati.
2010	INK Conference Fellow	–	–	Invited as a 'Fellow' at the first INK Conference, a TED-affiliated multidisciplinary conference.
2011	INK Speaker	–	–	Invited as a speaker at the INK Conference.
2021	Hollywood Gold Awards	Best Original Song	"New World Order"	Awarded under the Sci-fi category.
2021	Hollywood Gold Awards	Best Original Score	Fantasy of Companionship Between Human and Inanimate	Shared with Manu Martin & Ron Danziger, under the Animated Film category.
2021	Chicago Indie Film Awards	Best Composer	"New World Order"	Awarded in the 9th Edition of the Chicago Indie Film Awards.
2021	Cannes World Film Festival	Best Soundtrack	Fantasy of Companionship Between Human and Inanimate	Recognized at the Cannes World Film Festival (Feb 2021).

== Discography ==
Year	Film / Album	Song	Language	Composer(s)	Co-singer(s)
2003	Munna Bhai M.B.B.S.	"Dekhle Aankhon Mein Aankhien Daal (Remix)"	Hindi	Anu Malik	Sunidhi Chauhan
2008	Jumbo	"Dil Mera Jumbo"	Hindi	Ram Sampath	Solo
2009	Dev.D	"Ek Hulchul Si"	Hindi	Amit Trivedi	Solo
2009	Chal Chala Chal	"Aplam Chaplam"	Hindi	Anu Malik	Sunidhi Chauhan
2010	Kalavar King	"Eidhe Eidhe"	Telugu	Anil R	Solo
2010	Kalavar King	"Veede"	Telugu	Anil R	Solo
2010	Udaan	"Kahaani (Aankhon Ke Pardon Pe)"	Hindi	Amit Trivedi	Neuman Pinto
2010	Help	"Kehna Hai"	Hindi	Ashutosh Phatak	Suzanne D'Mello
2010	Joi: Looking out of the Window	Kot, Aikon Baikon, Bhaabisa Ki, Uri Jaai, Tejimola, Dusokute, Tumi, Doba	Assamese	Joi Barua	Solo
2011	No One Killed Jessica	"Dua"	Hindi	Amit Trivedi	Meenal Jain, Raman Mahadevan, Amitabh Bhattacharya
2011	Luv Ka The End	"Freak Out"	Hindi	Ram Sampath	Aditi Singh Sharma
2011	Zindagi Na Milegi Dobara	"Dil Dhadakne Do"	Hindi	Shankar–Ehsaan–Loy	Shankar Mahadevan, Suraj Jagan
2011	Mujhse Fraaandship Karoge	"Baatein Shuru"	Hindi	Raghu Dixit	Shefali Alvaris
2011	Hengool 2011-12	"Khiriki"	Assamese	Anurag Saikia	Solo
2011	Hengool 2011-12	"Khiriki (Unplugged)"	Assamese	Anurag Saikia	Solo
2012	Agent Vinod	"Raabta (Siyaah Raatein)"	Hindi	Pritam	Hamsika Iyer, Arijit Singh
2012	Agent Vinod	"Raabta Unplugged"	Hindi	Pritam	Arijit Singh
2013	I Don't Luv U	"Kuchh Hone Ko Hai"	Hindi	Aman-Benson	Raman Mahadevan
2013	Riders of the Mist	"Pitol Soku"	Assamese	Joi Barua	Solo
2014	Margarita with a Straw	"Dusokute"	Hindi	Joi Barua	Solo
2014	Marksheet	"Pagol Uxaah"	Assamese	Joi Barua	Solo
2016	Pride	"Rabha"	Assamese	Joi Barua	Featuring George Brooks (released as single)
2016	Pride	"Riders of the Mist"	English	Joi Barua	Solo (released as single)
2017	Pride	"Sitiki Bagori Jai"	Assamese	Joi Barua	Solo Featuring Krushnaa Patil (released as single)
2017	Pride	"Na Jujor Ronuwa"	Assamese	Joi Barua	Solo (released as single)
2017	Pride	"Kowa"	Assamese	Joi Barua	Solo
2018	Laila Majnu	"O Meri Laila"	Hindi	Joi Barua	Atif Aslam, Jyotica Tangri
2018	Laila Majnu	"Gaye Kaam Se"	Hindi	Joi Barua	Dev Negi, Amit Sharma, Meenal Jain
2018	Laila Majnu	"Lala Zula Zalio"	Hindi	Joi Barua	Sunidhi Chauhan, Joi Barua, Frankie (Kashmiri)
2018	Laila Majnu	"O Meri Laila (Radio Version)"	Hindi	Joi Barua	Solo
2018	24 Kisses	"Jaago Jaago"	Telugu	Joi Barua	Vibha Saraf, PVNS Rohit, Saandip, Sri Krishna
2019	The Illegal	"Subeh Dekh Li"	Hindi	Joi Barua	Ankit Tiwari
2021	Lim Fantasy of Companionship for Piano & Orchestra	Jungle Song, Alan Song, Origins, Synthetic DNA, New World Order, Teleportation	Symphony	Joi Barua, Susan Lim, Manu Martin, Mathieu Eymard, Ron Denzinger	London Symphony Orchestra, London Voices, Tedd Joselson, Arthur Fagen
2024	Woh Bhi Din The	"Banjare"	Hindi	Joi Barua	Rana Mazumder, Manik Batra, Adarsh Gourav
2024	Woh Bhi Din The	"Yeh Silsila"	Hindi	Joi Barua	Javed Ali
2024	Woh Bhi Din The	"Higher"	Hindi	Joi Barua	Jonita Gandhi
2024	Woh Bhi Din The	"Awaargi"	Hindi	Joi Barua	Sunidhi Chauhan
2024	Woh Bhi Din The	"Roothoon"	Hindi	Joi Barua	Zubin Garg, Monali Thakur
2024	Woh Bhi Din The	"Adhoore"	Hindi	Joi Barua	Suraj Jagan
2024	Woh Bhi Din The	"Woh Bhi Din The"	Hindi	Joi Barua	Amit Mishra
2024	Woh Bhi Din The	"Mujhko Mili"	Hindi	Joi Barua	Solo
2024	Woh Bhi Din The	"Guzarish"	Hindi	Joi Barua	Jankee Parekh Mehta
2025	Roi Roi Binale	"Freebird"	Assamese	Zubeen Garg	Papon
