= Mummy Punjabi =

Mummy Punjabi : Superman Ki Bhi Maa!!
- Directed by: Pammi Somal
- Written by: Pammi Somal
- Produced by: Pammi Somal; Sonny Somal
- Starring: Kiron Kher; Kanwaljit Singh; Jackie Shroff
- Cinematography: Vivek
- Edited by: Pammi Somal
- Music by: Aadesh Shrivastava
- Release date: 31 August 2011
- Country: India
- Languages: Hindi Punjabi English

Mummy Punjabi is a 2011 film written and directed by Pammi Somal starring Kiron Kher, Kanwaljit Singh and Jackie Shroff in lead roles.

== Plot ==
Baby Kaur is a "new age" Punjabi mother working as a entertainer. The story focused on her relationship with her husband, children, and neighbours.

== Cast ==
- Kirron Kher as Baby Kaur
- Kanwaljit Singh as Rajinder Singh
- Jackie Shroff as Kanwal Sandhu
- Anju Mahendru as Kanwal's Sister
- Divya Dutta as Muniya - Maidservant
- Sachin Sharma as Karan R. Arora
- Viraf Patel as Dr. Arjun R. Arora
- Simran Vaid as Simran R. Arora
- Supriya Shukla as Bittu
- Urwashi Gandhi as Jeena W. Puri
- Michael Joseph as Sid
- Freddy Daruwala as Sexy Sam
- Manav Vij as Vikramjit Singh
- Kashif Khan as DJ Abraham
- Gurdas Maan as Dancer / Singer (as Gurdas Maan)
- Satish Kaushik as Rajeev Bhalla
- Rohit Roy as Salman Khan / Rahul Sharma

== Soundtrack ==
All lyrics are written by Sameer.

| No. | Title | Singer(s) | Length |
|---|---|---|---|
| 1. | "I Wanna Rock Like Mummy Ji" | Richa Sharma, Neha Bhasin |
| 2. | "Kudiye Pataka" | Aadesh Shrivastava, Neha Bhasin |
| 3. | "Jashna Di Raat Hai" | Gurdas Maan, Neha Bhasin |
| 4. | "Mujhko Tu Pyaar Kara De" (Male) | Sonu Nigam |
| 5. | "Awaaz Do" | Shaan, Richa Sharma, Akriti Kakkar |
| 6. | "Mujhko Tu Pyaar Kara De" (Female) | Shraddha Pandit |
| 7. | "Hum Tum Akele Reh Gaye" | Hariharan |
| 8. | "Saada Chirian Da" |

== Reception ==
Mummy Punjabi received generally negative reviews from critics. Nikhat Kazmi of The Times of India gave the film a 2 star rating out of 5 saying, "The problem with Mummy Punjabi lies in the fact that it is neither a comedy nor a serious film, just something in-between. Wonder who is the target audience!".

Daily Bhaskar gave the film a single star out of five and said, "Nothing sums up ‘Mummy Punjabi,’ better than a brain-numbing movie with a mayhem stirring family drama. Add to this, outrageously bad acting by the supporting cast. This one's not recommended at all."
