= Saqib Saleem =

Indian actor and model (born 1988)

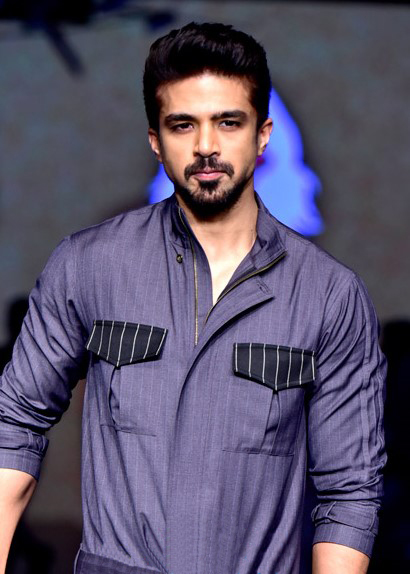
- Saleem at the Lakme Fashion Week in 2018
- Born: Saqib Saleem Qureshi; 8 April 1988 (age 38); New Delhi, India
- Occupations: Actor, model
- Years active: 2011–present
- Relatives: Huma Qureshi (sister)

Saqib Saleem Qureshi (pronounced [saːqɪb səˈliːm qʊɾeːʃi]; born 8 April 1988) is an Indian actor and model who works in the Hindi film industry. He worked as a model before beginning his film career. After moving to Mumbai, Qureshi appeared in several advertisements. While doing television commercials, he grew interest in films and started auditioning for film roles, eventually signing a two-film deal with the Y-Films, a subsidiary of the Yash Raj Films (YRF), as an actor.

Qureshi made his acting debut with a leading role in the 2011 romantic comedy Mujhse Fraaandship Karoge, a box-office success. He was appreciated for his performance in the film and earned a Filmfare Award nomination in the Best Male Debut category. The following year, he completed his two-film contract with the Y-Films by appearing in Mere Dad Ki Maruti, a romantic comedy that proved to be a critical and commercial success. Subsequently, he played a closeted homosexual person in a segment directed by Karan Johar in the experimental anthology Bombay Talkies (2013) and his highest-grossing release came with the action thriller Race 3 (2018).

In addition to acting in films, Qureshi is an active charitable worker, has a number of endorsement deals, and a member of the "Mumbai Heroes" at the Celebrity Cricket League, a non-professional men's cricket league in India. The actor's interest in stand-up comedy has increased lately because of his upcoming role in “Comedy Couple”, a rom-com co-starring Shweta Basu Prasad that is based in Gurgaon against the backdrop of the burgeoning stand-up comedy scene in the city.

== Early life and modeling career ==
Saqib Saleem was born in Delhi, India. His father, Saleem Qureshi, is a restaurateur, and runs a chain of 10 restaurants called Saleem's, all around Delhi. His mother, Ameena Qureshi, is a housewife. He has one sister Huma Qureshi and two brothers, Naeem Qureshi and Haseen Qureshi. During college, Saqib briefly assisted in the running of the restaurants, but did not like it. By that time Saqib had already started modelling, and he moved to Mumbai despite his father's preference that he stay in Delhi and earn a Master of Business Administration degree.

Saqib started his career with cricket, playing for Delhi and Jammu & Kashmir. A cricketer all his life, Saqib never thought of becoming an actor. After reaching Mumbai, Saleem started out by doing a few modelling assignments, eventually moving into television advertisements for brands like Pepsi, Lays (with actor Ranbir Kapoor), Tata Docomo, Bar One, KFC, Airtel, Sprite and others. While shooting for the ads, Saqib's interest grew in acting and he started auditioning for film roles in Bollywood films. His close friend, fashion designer Varun Bahl, helped him get a chance to audition for Yash Raj Films. "It was gruelling," he recalls. After eight months of auditioning, he bagged the leading role in the Y-Films romantic comedy Mujhse Fraaandship Karoge.

== Career ==
=== 2011-2012: Debut and breakthrough ===
"Today's youth spend a lot of time on Facebook. You are constantly connected to each other through so many things like BBM. I feel the ways our lives have been till now, our college experiences, the fun we had back then. We drew inspiration from all these things."

— Saleem talking about his main inspiration behind the character of Vishal in Mujhse Fraaandship Karoge'.

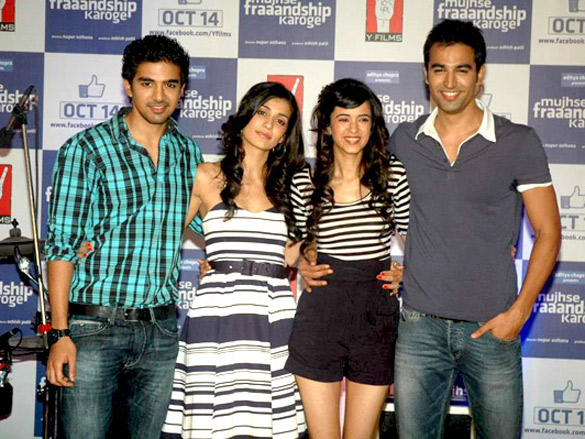
Saleem (left) with Tara D'Souza, Saba Azad and Nishant Dahaiya at the promotional event of Mujhse Fraaandship Karoge in 2011.

In 2011, one of his friends informed him that Bollywood film production house Yash Raj Films (YRF) was auditioning for new faces. Saleem was interested and he gave his audition. However, it was 8--9 months before he got confirmation from the production house that he had been selected. The film for which he was selected for was Mujhse Fraaandship Karoge, a romantic comedy set against the backdrop of social networking site Facebook; it was directed by debutante Nupur Asthana. Mujhse Fraaandship Karoge is a love story which develops on Facebook where the protagonists change identities to make their partners fall in love with them. Starring newcomers Nishant Dahiya and Saba Azad, along with Saleem and Tara D’Souza, the film was released under Y-Films, a subsidiary of YRF. The role that Saleem had to play was that of a college prankster called Vishal Bhatt, who with his friend Hacky, go on playing pranks on their friends. Saleem explained that he "liked the script and I did it. I feel the youth will relate and connect with it. I think the movie will put me in a different light and open lot of doors for me." The youngsters had to undergo a month of workshops under Aditya Chopra, where they rehearsed each other's lines from the script.

Filming began in April 2011, with production continuing till August 2011. Mujhse Fraaandship Karoge released all over India on 14 October 2011, and became a critical success. Anupama Chopra from NDTV complimented the film for being a hackneyed love story, but excitingly brewed with fresh faces. She also commended Saleem's and Azad's acting, calling them faces to look out for in the coming years. Filmfare's Karishma Loynmoon applauded the chemistry and comic timing between Saleem and Azad, and overall dedicating the success of the film to them. Her view was shared by Nikhat Kazmi from The Times of India, who added that the film "brimmed over" with youth iconography. Mujhse Fraaandship Karoge scored high over the other releases like Aazaan and My Friend Pinto. The film collected about ₹5 million (US$52,000) on the first day of its release, adding it to first weekend collection of about ₹22.5 million (US$230,000) in the opening weekend. It was declared an average grosser by Box Office India. By the end of 2011, Saleem was touted as the best newcomer of the year, with Robin Bansal from Hindustan Times commenting that "Saleem's American Pie college boy style is expected to take him places, if he manages to get plum film projects in the future." Critic Joginder Tuteja commented that although Saleem did not have the personality of a quintessential Bollywood hero, he made his presence felt in Mujhse Fraaandship Karoge. "It will be a pity if he isn't seen in the years to come", concluded Tuteja. At the 57th Filmfare Awards, Saleem was nominated in the Best Male Debut category.

=== 2013-present: Recent work ===
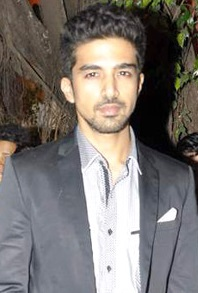
Saleem at the audio release of Mere Dad Ki Maruti in 2013.

The following year, Saleem appeared in Y-Films's comedy Mere Dad Ki Maruti, opposite Rhea Chakraborty, which was directed by Ashima Chibber. The film revolves around a Punjabi wedding, where a boy (played by Saleem) steals his father's car to impress a girl and portrays how his plans go astray. The year 2013 saw the release of the experimental anthology film Bombay Talkies consisting of four short films. Saleem was part of the Karan Johar's segment titled "Ajeeb Dastaan Hai Yeh", opposite Rani Mukerji and Randeep Hooda. He played the role of Avinash, a young homosexual man, who is infatuated by his co-worker's husband.

Saleem followed this success with a lead role of Aniket Bhargava, a skating coach in the 2014 passionate drama Hawaa Hawaai. Directed by Amol Gupte, the film was proved to be a critical and commercial success, and Saleem received positive reviews for his performance; film critic Subhash K. Jha concluded, "Saqib is very cinematic, we witness the full force of Saqib's virtuosity. Noyon Jyoti Parasara wrote that "Saqib justifies his place". Saleem's next role was of a cricketer in the action thriller Dishoom (2016), also starring Varun Dhawan, John Abraham and Jacqueline Fernandez. Although Saleem said that the story of the film revolves around his character, critics noted that his "brief role" was overshadowed by the film's leading cast. The films was a commercial success. Despite mixed reviews, the film proved to be moderately successful at the box office. The Relativity Media and Balaji Telefilms joint-production Dobaara: See Your Evil featured Saleem and his sister (Huma Qureshi) as the children who are convicted with their parents murder. Directed by Prawaal Raman, the film was the official remake of the 2014 Hollywood film Oculus, and received mixed reviews from critics. The romantic comedy Dil Juunglee saw Saleem play a typical Delhi boy who aspires to be an actor but falls in love with his best friend (played by Taapsee Pannu). Although the film was poorly received and failed at the Box Office India, Saleem and Pannu's on-screen chemistry was praised by several critics. Sweta Kausal of Hindustan Times said that it was only "Taapsee Pannu's charm and Saqib Saleem's earthiness that keep the movie from getting unbearable." Renuka Vyavahare of The Times of India commented "Barring the earnest performances of the lead actors and the supporting cast, there's absolutely nothing wild or memorable about the film." After this he has worked in action-thriller Race 3 directed by choreographer changed director Remo D' Souza also starring Salman Khan, Jacqueline Fernandez, Daisy Shah, Anil Kapoor. The film was commercial success.

=== Web series ===
In 2018, he did his OTT debut with ZEE5 Original web series Rangbaaz wherein he portrayed the role of a notorious gangster which was based on a true story. In 2020, he played the role of an RAW agent in Voot's spy thriller web series named Crackdown.

== Off-screen work ==
In addition to acting in films and modeling, Saleem is a member of the "Mumbai Heroes" along with several actors at the Celebrity Cricket League (CCL), a non-professional men's cricket league in India consisting of film actors from eight regional film industries of the Indian cinema. The league was commenced in 2011, and since its establishment, it has been widely reported in the Indian media.

== Filmography ==
=== Film ===
Key
†	Denotes films that have not yet been released

Year	Title	Role	Notes
2011	Mujhse Fraaandship Karoge	Vishal Bhatt	Nominated—Filmfare Award for Best Male Debut
2013	Mere Dad Ki Maruti	Sameer Khullar	
2013	Bombay Talkies	Avinash	Segment: "Ajeeb Dastaan Hai Yeh"
2014	Hawaa Hawaai	Aniket Bhargava	
2016	Dishoom	Viraj Sharma	
2017	Dobaara: See Your Evil	Kabir Alex Merchant	
2018	Dil Juunglee	Sumit Uppal	
2018	Race 3	Suraj Singh	
2019	Pyaar Actually - Real is Rare	Vishal	
2020	Comedy Couple	Deep Sharma	ZEE5 film
2021	Time to Dance	Navdeep Singh	
2021	83	Mohinder Amarnath	
2024	Kakuda	Sunny	ZEE5 film
2025	Single Salma	—N/a	Producer
2026	Baby Do Die Do	Alpha Q	Also producer
2026	Gajab Raat	NIA Karan Gill	

=== Television ===
Year	Title	Role	Notes	Ref.
2018	Rangbaaz	Shiv Prakash Shukla		
2020	Crackdown	Riyaz Pathan	Won— Iconic Gold Awards for Powerpacked Performance of the Year - Male	
2022	Unpaused: Naya Safar	Chandan		
2024	Citadel: Honey Bunny	KD (Kedar)		
2025	Crime Beat	Abhishek Sinha		
2026	Kaptaan	Samar		

=== Short film ===
Year	Title	Role	Notes
2017	AAMAD	Abhay	Nominated for Jio Filmfare Awards
