= Mere Dad Ki Maruti =

- Theatrical release poster
- Directed by: Ashima Chibber
- Screenplay by: Neeraj Udhwani; Pooja Desai; Ashima Chibber
- Story by: Neeraj Udhwani
- Produced by: Ashish Patil
- Starring: Saqib Saleem; Rhea Chakraborty; Ram Kapoor; Prabal Panjabi; Ravi Kishan
- Cinematography: Adil Afsar
- Edited by: Antara Lahiri
- Music by: Sachin Gupta
- Production company: Y-Films
- Distributed by: Yash Raj Films
- Release date: 15 March 2013
- Running time: 101 minutes
- Country: India
- Language: Hindi
- Box office: ₹12.54 crore

Mere Dad Ki Maruti (transl. My dad's Maruti) is a 2013 Indian comedy film directed by Ashima Chibber, featuring Saqib Saleem, Ram Kapoor and Prabal Panjabi in lead roles. It also features newcomer Rhea Chakraborty in a pivotal role.

== Plot ==
The plot is set in Chandigarh Tricity, where a wedding is about to take place at the Khullar House, and father Tej Khullar has bought a new Maruti Ertiga car as a wedding gift for his daughter and would-be son-in-law. A few days before the wedding, his college-going son, Sameer, who the father thinks is good for nothing, secretly takes the car out to impress the hottest girl in college, Jasleen. After dropping Jasleen at her hostel and in a drunk state, he loses the car by accidentally giving the keys to a person who Sameer thinks is a valet. As soon as he realises that the valet doesn't have the keys and he has lost his car, he and his best friend Gattu go on an all-night search to find the car.

The next day they get an Ertiga model (test drive) to the house to show Sameer's father that the car was still in the garage. They also meet a car dealer, Pathan, and agree to purchase a stolen Ertiga from him. Pathan promises them to give the car the very next day. To ensure that there is a car in the garage in the night, they take another Ertiga on rent from a Dahiya Jat family from Panchkula and heading to Mohali and bring it home. The day before the wedding, Sameer returns Ertiga and in the night, goes to meet Pathan along with Gattu and Jasleen. While at Pathan's place, a police raid happens and the three barely manage to escape. Pathan's assistant calls Sameer, telling him to take the car, but it's a trap set by the police, and Sameer ends up in jail.

On the morning of the wedding, Sameer explains to the cops what happened, but the cops insist on meeting his father. Sameer informs his sister, who sends her fiancé to bail out Sameer. While this is happening, a cop informs the police control room that an Ertiga is being stolen by a gang using a tow truck. A chase ensues, and police catch the thieves and hand the car back to Sameer.

After the wedding ceremony, Sameer manages to get the car back decorated and behaves as if nothing has happened. But a few minutes later, Gattu brings another Ertiga to Sameer's home, and so does Jasleen, leaving everyone shocked and confused as there are three Ertigas. Sameer then confesses to his father in the presence of everyone what happened over the past few days. His father loses his temper, chides him, but then forgives him, and all are happy.

It is revealed that Gattu had won a contest where the first prize was a Maruti Ertiga, and since Jasleen had saved a Jat family member's life by taking him to the hospital on time, the Dahiya Jat family gifts the car to her in gratitude.

== Cast ==
- Saqib Saleem as Sameer Khullar
- Rhea Chakraborty as Jasleen
- Ram Kapoor as Tej Khullar, Sameer and Tanvi's father
- Prabal Panjabi as Gattu
- Ravi Kishan as Pathan
- Benazir Shaikh as Tanvi Khullar
- Karan Veer Mehra as Raj, Jasleen's brother, Tanvi's fiancé
- Karam Rajpal as Daljeet
- Savita Bhatti as Guest at wedding
- Wilhelmina McFadden as Lady Trustee
- Sanjay Chaudhury as Garage Boy
- Rani Kochhar

== Music ==
The music of the film has been composed by Sachin Gupta with lyrics penned by Kumaar and Anvita Dutt Guptan. The film also has a second music album which includes only background scores and is one of the first to have two such albums.

No.	Title	Singer(s)	Length
1.	"Punjabiyan Di Battery"	Mika Singh & Yo Yo Honey Singh
2.	"Main Senti Hoon"	Jaspreet Jasz & Shalmali Kholgade
3.	"Haaay"	Panjabi MC
4.	"Hip Hip Hurrah"	Sonu Kakkar
5.	"Mere Dad Ka Mash Up"	DJ Shadow, DJ Raamji
6.	"Mere Dad Ki Maruti"	Diljit Dosanjh, Sachin Gupta

== Reception ==
Raja Sen of Rediff.com gave the film 3.5 out of 5, calling it "fresh and fun." Taran Adarsh of Bollywood Hungama also gave the film 3.5 out of 5, writing, "On the whole, MERE DAD KI MARUTI is a joyride. Mazedaar, masaledaar, full-on entertainer. Hitch a ride on this one instantly!"
