= Crime Beat =

2025 Indian crime thriller web series

- Genre: Crime thriller
- Based on: The Price You Pay by Somnath Batabyal
- Directed by: Sudhir Mishra; Sanjeev Kaul
- Starring: Saqib Saleem; Rahul Bhat; Sai Tamhankar; Danish Husain; Rajesh Tailang; Saba Azad
- Music by: Joel Crasto
- Country of origin: India
- Original language: Hindi
- No. of seasons: 1
- No. of episodes: 8

Production
- Executive producer: Subhash Chavan
- Producers: Rajiv Ramesh Agarwal; Manju Ramesh Agarwal; Arvind Kumar Agarwal
- Editor: Umesh Gupta
- Production company: Content Films productions

Original release
- Network: ZEE5
- Release: February 21, 2025

Crime Beat is an Indian Hindi-language crime thriller web series directed by Sudhir Mishra and Sanjeev Kaul. Starring Saqib Saleem, Rahul Bhat, Danish Husain, Saba Azad, Kishor Kadam, Sai Tamhankar, Vipin Sharma, Rajesh Tailang, Gaurav Dwivedi, Adinath Kothare and Vipin Sharma. The series is inspired by Somnath Batabyal's 2013 novel The Price You Pay. It revolves around investigative journalism and crime reporting. Produced by Rajiv Ramesh Agarwal & Manju Ramesh Agarwal, Crime Beat released on February 21, 2025 on ZEE5.

== Plot summary ==
The story follows Abhishek Sinha, a rookie journalist navigating the competitive field of crime reporting. His investigation takes a new turn when he uncovers information about the possible return of a fugitive gangster to India. As he pursues the lead, he works with law enforcement and encounters the complex intersections of crime, politics, and media. Along the way, he faces ethical challenges, professional ambitions, and the risks associated with exposing hidden truths.

== Cast ==
- Saqib Saleem as Abhishek Sinha
- Rahul Bhat as Binny Chaudhary
- Sai Tamhankar as Archana Pandey
- Danish Husain as Amir Akhtar
- Rajesh Tailang as DCP Uday Kumar
- Saba Azad as Maya Mathur
- Gaurav Dwivedi as Atul
- Adinath Kothare as ACP Mayank
- Kishor Kadam as Pashupati
- Vipin Sharma as S K Rawat
- Nikhat Khan as Nirmala Devi Kapoor
- Mustafa Burmawala as Imran Ali
- Ashwath Bhatt as Prashant Negi
- Payal Nair as Ashwini Mahaldar
- Tarana Raja as Sameera Saxena
- Bhupesh Singh as Captain
- Rajendra Chawla as NK Rawat

== Episodes ==
No.	Title	Directed by	Original release date
1	"The How What and Why"	Sudhir Mishra, Sanjeev Kaul	21 February 2025
Delhi's notorious mafia don, Binny Chaudhary, returns to the city and is killed in front of a large crowd. Rookie crime reporter Abhishek Sinha investigates the don's life for his next big story.
2	"Master of Disguise"	Sudhir Mishra, Sanjeev Kaul	21 February 2025
Amir Akhtar approaches DCP Uday for insights into Binny's past. Meanwhile, Abhishek uncovers the existence of a mysterious figure known as 'Heroine,' linked to Binny. Determined to dig deeper, he pursues the lead on his own after Amir limits his role in the investigation.
3	"The Escape"	Sudhir Mishra, Sanjeev Kaul	21 February 2025
Abhishek gets caught trespassing in Binny's mansion. Meanwhile, Binny evades the CBI-Interpol with the aid of an Iranian tribe. Elsewhere, ACP Mayank uncovers a vital clue about the elusive 'Heroine.'
4	"The Homecoming"	Sudhir Mishra, Sanjeev Kaul	21 February 2025
Binny discreetly arrives in Mumbai instead of Delhi, catching DCP Uday and Rawat off guard. His unexpected return unsettles 'Heroine,' while Abhishek continues his relentless pursuit for a front-page breakthrough.
5	"Karne Kaun Dega"	Sudhir Mishra, Sanjeev Kaul	21 February 2025
Following Abhishek's tip, ACP Mayank locates 'Heroine,' triggering a deadly shootout that results in Salim's death. In the aftermath, DCP Uday reprimands Mayank for the operation and unveils a startling truth about his father, who died a martyr.
6	"Main Lakshya Hoon Tera"	Sudhir Mishra, Sanjeev Kaul	21 February 2025
Abhishek quits Amir's firm and faces difficulties securing work. With the support of senior photographer Pashupati, he lands a position at a leading newspaper. Soon after, he unexpectedly comes face to face with Binny Chaudhary.
7	"Khiladi, Katputli aur Khel"	Sudhir Mishra, Sanjeev Kaul	21 February 2025
'Heroine' leads Abhishek to Binny, who hands him a video containing businessman Mahajan's confession. As Abhishek interviews Binny, the CBI, acting on Minister Rawat's orders, closes in with the intent to eliminate Binny.
8	"The New Ringmaster"	Sudhir Mishra, Sanjeev Kaul	21 February 2025
Maya is abducted by Binny's men and is shocked to discover her father's connection to the CWG scam. As ACP Mayank leads the CBI to the scene, he is compelled to withdraw. Meanwhile, Binny makes his final move.

== Critical reception ==
Upon its release, Crime Beat received mixed reviews from critics.

Archika Khurana of Times of India rated the series 3.5 out of 5 stars, stating "Whether you're a fan of investigative journalism narratives or gripping crime dramas, Crime Beat offers an engaging watch—filled with tension, ambition, and the harsh realities of chasing the truth."

Sumit Rajguru of Times Now gave the series a 2 out of 5 rating, describing it as "a decent web series that has predictable twists and average performances. The show has its plus and minus points. If you are a crime show lover, you will definitely like it."

Troy Ribeiro of Free Press Journal found the series "competent, well-acted, and atmospheric," but felt it lacked lasting impact. He remarked, "It's an efficient drama but never an urgent one—much like a crime report that you read, nod at, and then forget by morning coffee." Nandini Ramnath of Scroll.in called it "A compulsively conspiratorial show" OTTplay critiqued the series for not delving deeper into its themes, suggesting that it remained on the surface level without substantial exploration of the underlying issues.

Saibal Chatterjee of NDTV gave the series a 3 out of 5 rating, noting "Saqib Saleem holds the fort with confidence in this series. Saba Azad and Sai Tamhankar do the same in a male-dominated show."

Vinamra Mathur of Firstpost rated the series 2.5 out of 5 stars, commenting "Saqib Salim and Saba Azad reunite for a middling take on journalism and sensationalism."
