= Luv Ka The End =

2011 Hindi comedy film directed by Bumpy

- Theatrical release poster
- Directed by: Bumpy
- Screenplay by: Shenaz Treasurywala; Roye Seagal
- Story by: Ashish Patil
- Produced by: Ashish Patil
- Starring: Shraddha Kapoor; Taaha Shah
- Cinematography: Adil Afsar
- Edited by: Saurabh Kulkarni
- Music by: Ram Sampath
- Production company: Y-Films
- Distributed by: Yash Raj Films
- Release date: 6 May 2011
- Running time: 106 minutes
- Country: India
- Language: Hindi

Luv Ka The End (transl. The end of Luv) is a 2011 Hindi-language romantic comedy film directed by Bumpy, starring Shraddha Kapoor and Taaha Shah. The film was the first production of Y-Films, a subsidiary of Yash Raj Films and released to mostly positive reviews on 6 May 2011. The film is also loosely based on the 2009 American film Wild Cherry, the 2006 American film John Tucker Must Die and John Green's novel Paper Towns.

== Plot ==
Rhea Dialdas has just completed her JC (Junior College), and wants to marry her boyfriend, Luv Nanda. He is competing in a contest called BBC (Billionaire Boys Club), which is popular amongst billionaire boys. In the contest, the boys upload videos of themselves with girls, engaging in intimate activities, on the website, and the more they do so, the more points they get. Luv Nanda was going to become the highest scorer that year. This was shown to Rhea by the brother of a friend of hers.

The only way for Luv to win this contest was to get Rhea into bed with him on her 18th birthday eve and have sex with her, as this would've provided him another 1,000 points, which would've propelled his profile to untouchable heights for that year. She goes along naively until she realizes that it's not love but points that Luv is trying to score. Now out to get him by the balls, she has a plan up her sleeve with her gal pals. Rhea believes that Luv has power as long as his car, cash, charm, and his friends are intact. Rhea makes a pact with Minty (her sister) and then goes to take everything from Luv Nanda, by which he attracts girls (who now want to have Natasha in place of Rhea). She breaks his car, screws his date with Natasha as she accidentally eats the cupcake, which was meant for Luv, and she is forced to go to the toilet on a public road. She spikes his drink, after which comes the famous Mutton Song, where Luv dances in a bar, dressed up like a girl. The video of him dancing is sent to Luv's friends, who believe he is gay, and the girls steal his credit cards to buy hot posters of actors and mannequins so that Luv's father thinks he is gay.

Then, at Golu's party, where Freddie Kapoor came to play, she takes Luv to a room where hidden cameras were put to shoot the whole proceeding. Luv, who's found out about Rhea's plan, ties Rhea's hands. But she unties herself and sprays pepper spray on Luv to take revenge on him for leaving her and makes him realize the consequences of cheating a girl and proceeds to tell him that, though girls don't have balls, they sure do know how to kick them, after which she kicks Luv's balls. Before she comes out of the room, she announces that Billionaire Boys Club is officially shut down. When she comes out of the room, she finds everyone cheering for her. Natasha finds out that Rhea destroyed her car, but she forgives Rhea for doing that. Everyone goes to Freddie Kapoor's concert and watches him sing. They all clap for him. Rhea's parents call them and tell them to come back home just in time. Freddie Kapoor witnesses this and asks them if he can drop them off, to which they say "yes." The film proceeds to have Freddie Kapoor drop Rhea at her home and ask Rhea for a date, to which Rhea replies by telling him to call her. In a semi-post-credits scene, we see Timmy telling Luv that he (Timmy) is gay and he knows that so is Luv (part of the plan of the girls) and jumps on him after lowering his pants.

== Cast ==
- Shraddha Kapoor as Rhea Dialdas
- Taaha Shah as Luv Nanda
- Pushtiie Shakti as Jugs
- Sreejita De as Sonia Lovani
- Errol Marks as Gollu
- Meherzan Mazda as Timmy
- Riya Bamniyal as Natasha Oberoi
- Rahul Pardasany as Karthikeyan Ramachandran
- Shenaz Treasurywala as Ms.Naaz
- Archana Puran Singh as Lux Lovani (Sonia's Mother)
- Jannat Zubair Rahmani as Minty Dialdas (Rhea's Sister)
- Ali Zafar as Freddie Kapoor (Special Appearance)
- Bumpy as Daman Ramachandran (Kartikeyan Brother)
- Natasha Sharma as BBC Website

== Soundtrack ==
Luv Ka The End

Soundtrack album by Ram Sampath
- Released: 4 March 2011
- Recorded: 2011
- Genre: Soundtrack
- Length: 19:20
- Label: YRF Music
- Producer: Ram Sampath

Ram Sampath chronology
Game (2011)	Luv Ka The End (2011)	Delhi Belly (2011)

The music is composed by Ram Sampath. Lyrics are penned by Amitabh Bhattacharya. The Music got mixed reviews from the critics. Bollywood Hungama gave the music 2.5 stars, stating that it was an album for people looking from a break from the usual Bollywood fare.

=== Track listing ===
Track-list
No.	Title	Performer(s)	Length
1.	"F.U.N. Fun Fanaa"	Ali Zafar	4:24
2.	"Freak Out"	Joi Barua, Aditi Singh Sharma	3:08
3.	"Heppy Budday Beybee"	Jimmy Moses	0:42
4.	"Luv Ka The End"	Aditi Singh Sharma	3:45
5.	"The Mutton Song"	Krishna	4:21
6.	"Tonight"	Suman Sridhar	3:00
Total length:			19:20

=== Reception ===
The Music got mixed review from the critics. Bollywood Hungama gave the music 2.5 stars, stating that it was an album for people looking from a break from the usual Bollywood fare.

== Production ==
=== Development ===
On 1 April 2011 the film was unveiled publicly as the first production venture of Y-Films and the cast of the film met the press along with the actors from Y-Films' other two ventures, Mujhse Fraaandship Karoge and Virus Diwan.

== Reception ==
=== Critical reception ===
Luv Ka The End opened to positive reviews across India. Taaha Shah and Shraddha Kapoor managed to get rave reviews from most critics. The rest of the characters also were highly praised for their performance. The newcomers showed tremendous confidence and were bang on in their portrayal of the different characters that they played. Pushtiie Shakti who played Jugs in the film was highly praised. Errol Peter Marks who plays gollu was praised by Taran Adarsh. Meherzan Mazda of Seven fame was also appreciated for his portrayal of a Gym Freak. Taran Adarsh of Bollywood Hungama gave the film 3.5 out of 5 stars. VJ Archana gave the film 4 on 5 stars calling it a crazy fun ride. RJ Jeeturaj praised the film for its freshness, execution and approach. Yahoo movies gave the film 3 out of 5 stars. Nikhat Kazmi of Times of India rated it 2 out of 5 and wrote – "The film scores only in some of its performances (Shraddha Kapoor's gang) and might appeal to young collegiates who want to miss a few boring tutorials". Entertainment portal FilmiTadka stated – Luv Ka The End is like what Rock music (not in the good sense) is to a Jazz lover, instead of a solid script, the director has tried to fill in voids with noise. Song 'Mutton' to me will the most vulgar song of this year, we at FilmiTadka give it 1.5 out of 5 stars. Anupama Chopra of NDTV said – "Sensibility of this film is not youthful, it's juvenile. And that's before you get to the part where Luv, under the influence of some pill, dresses in drag and breaks into a song that goes: Mera jism, jism, mera badan, badan, main hun taza mutton mutton, khol dilon ke button button. I’m not sure what demographic that is aimed at but it definitely not for me. I’m going with one and a half star".
