= Tara D'Souza =

Indian actress and model

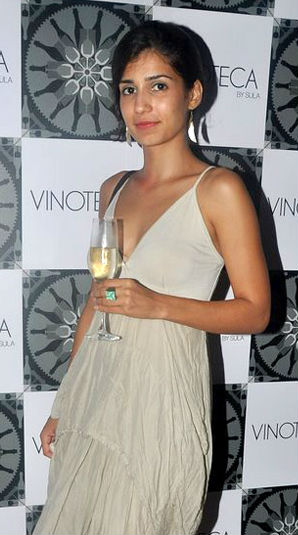
- Tara D'Souza at launch of Sula's Vinoteca
- Born: Tara Concepta D'Souza; 20 December 1986 (age 38); Hyderabad, Telangana, India
- Occupation: Actress
- Years active: 2005–2018

Tara Concepta D'Souza (born 20 December 1986) is an Indian actress and model, known for her work in the films Mujhse Fraaandship Karoge and Mere Brother Ki Dulhan.

== Early life and background ==
D'Souza was born in Hyderabad, Telangana, India to Konkani parents Andreas and Diane D'Souza. She also has one brother, Noel Prasad D'Souza and one sister, Mira D'Souza. She attended Vidyaranya High School for Boys and Girls, a school which is partly based on the teachings of Jiddu Krishnamurti.

== Career ==
=== Modeling ===
While in college, D'Souza pursued a career in modeling and was a former Kingfisher Calendar girl, chosen after 2010 reality TV series, Kingfisher Calendar Model Hunt on NDTV Good Times.

=== Acting ===
In 2005, D'Souza made her cinematic debut in The Angrez (2005) which was a Tollywood film which only released in some parts of Hyderabad and did become a super hit film locally, and since it didn't release in many theaters she was not well known after this picture. She was cast in Yash Raj Films Mere Brother Ki Dulhan opposite Ali Zafar; it was considered as a hit. Fans enjoyed her performance in this film and she became very well known. She also acted in Mujhse Fraaandship Karoge, a story based on Facebook, which received positive reviews.

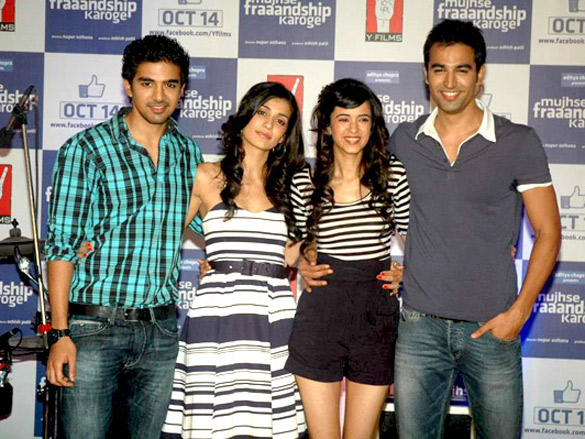
The cast of Mujhse Fraaandship Karogee. From left: Saqib Saleem, Tara D'Souza, Saba Azad and Nishant Dahiya

== Filmography ==
Year	Film	Role	Language
2005	The Angrez	Sheetal	Hyderabadi Urdu
2011	Mere Brother Ki Dulhan	Piyali	Hindi
2011	Mujhse Fraaandship Karoge	Malvika	Hindi

=== Television ===
- Daanav Hunters (2015)
- Zero KMS (2018)

== See also ==
- List of Indian film actresses
