= Candice Boucher =

South African model and actress

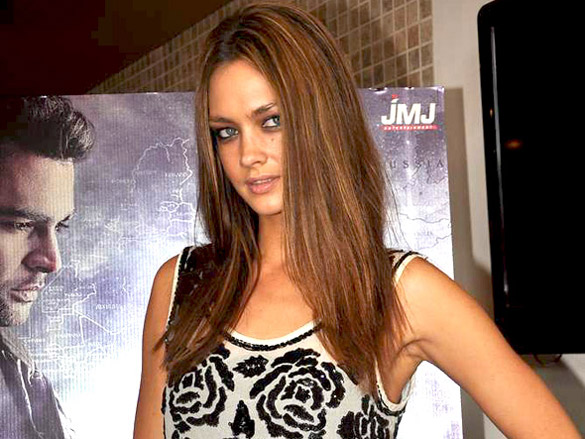
- Candice Boucher in 2012
- Born: Durban, South Africa
- Other names: Bouchie; Cands
- Years active: 2009–2011
- Children: 1
- Modeling information
- Hair color: brown
- Eye color: blue
- Agency: Models International; Ice Models

Candice Boucher is a South African model and actress. In 2010, Boucher was on the cover of Playboy and Sports Illustrated. In 2011, she starred in the Bollywood film Aazaan.

== Early life and modeling ==
Candice Boucher was born in Durban, South Africa. When she was seventeen, she participated in her high school's annual pageant at the urging of her friends. She won the competition and a photo shoot with a local photographer. The photographer sent the photos of Boucher to Models International, a South African modeling agency. The company reached out to Boucher and offered her representation.

== Career ==
After graduating high school, Boucher moved to Cape Town to pursue modeling. Boucher has been a cover model for Cosmopolitan and has modeled for FHM, GQ, Fila, Speedo, Sports Illustrated and Elle.

Boucher became the new model for Guess in 2009. In April 2010, Boucher was on the cover of, and had the pictorial in, Playboy. The photo shoot took place in Kenya and was titled "Undressed in Africa." Months later, in October, she was on the cover of Sports Illustrated. In 2011, she co-starred in the film Aazaan with Sachiin J Joshi.

== Filmography ==
Year	Title	Role	Notes
2011	Aazaan	Afreen	Film debut

== Personal life ==
Boucher lives in New York City.
