= Suparna Marwah =

Indian actress

- Born: Suparna Marwah; Mumbai, Maharashtra, India
- Occupation: Actress
- Years active: 2004–present
- Known for: Mahi Way

Suparna Marwah, is an Indian TV and film actress, known for her work in the films Mujhse Fraaandship Karoge and Mere Brother Ki Dulhan. She appeared on TV's some mega-projects like Mahi Way, which was produced by film producers Aditya Chopra and Yash Chopra of Yash Raj Films under their new production house name YRF Television.

== Filmography ==
| Year | Film | Role |
|---|---|---|
| 2010 | Break Ke Baad | Khaala |
| 2011 | Patiala House | Harleen Kahlon |
| 2011 | Mere Brother Ki Dulhan | Kasak Agnihotri |
| 2011 | Always Kabhi Kabhi | Nandini's mother |
| 2011 | Mujhse Fraaandship Karoge | Preity's Mother |
| 2011 | Desi Boyz | Female Judge |
| 2012 | Housefull 2 | Sweety Kapoor |
| 2015 | Katti Batti | Maddy's Mother |
| 2017 | Phillauri | Anu's Mother |
| 2017 | Raees | Maheera's Mother |
| 2019 | Manikarnika: The Queen of Jhansi | Raajmata |
| 2019 | Kabir Singh | Preeti's Mother |
| 2019 | Ujda Chaman | Mrs Batra |
| 2020 | Chhalaang | Sakshi Mehra |
| 2022 | Jugjugg Jeeyo | Nainaa'Mother |

== Television ==
| Year | Show | Role | Channel | Notes |
|---|---|---|---|---|
| 2010 | Mahi Way | Ranjita Tanwar | Sony TV | |
| 2014 | Siyaasat | Asmat Begum | Epic TV | |
| 2023 | Badtameez Dil | Babita | Amazon Mini TV | |
