= Y-Films =

Company owned by Yash Raj Films

- Company type: Film production Film distribution
- Industry: Films
- Founded: 2011
- Headquarters: Mumbai, Maharashtra, India
- Key people: Aditya Chopra; Ashish Patil
- Parent: Yash Raj Films

Y-Films is an Indian film production and distribution company, based in Mumbai. The company is a subsidiary of Yash Raj Films.

== History ==
The company was launched on 1 April 2011 by Aditya Chopra, who revealed that Yash Raj Films would create a new film studio, Y-Films, and concentrate on introducing fresh talent.

The event saw promotional material released for three future productions, with Ashish Patil being announced as chief producer.

== Filmography ==
=== Films ===
Year	Title	Director	Cast	Notes
2011	Luv Ka The End	Bumpy	Shraddha Kapoor, Taaha Shah, Riya Bamniyal	Released on 6 May 2011
2011	Mujhse Fraaandship Karoge	Nupur Asthana	Saqib Saleem, Saba Azad, Nishant Dahiya, Tara D’Souza	Released on 14 October 2011
2013	Mere Dad Ki Maruti	Ashima Chibber	Saqib Saleem, Ram Kapoor, Rhea Chakraborty	Released on 15 March 2013
2017	Bank Chor	Bumpy	Ritesh Deshmukh, Vivek Oberoi, Rhea Chakraborty	Released on 16 June 2017

=== Web series ===
Year	Title	Director	No. of episodes	Main Cast	Release date
2015	Man's World	Vikram Gupta	4	Gaurav Pandey, Gurpreet Saini, Nivedita Shukla, Ramakant Dayma, Ronjini Chakraborty, Shikha Talsania, Silky Khanna and others	29 September 2015
2015	Bang Baaja Baaraat	Anand Tiwari	5	Ali Fazal, Angira Dhar, Ayesha Raza, Gajraj Rao, Rajit Kapur, Shernaz Patel, Preetika Chawla, Priyanshu Painyuli, Neil Bhoopalam, Shernavaz Jijina	4 November 2015
2016	Love Shots	Ankur Tewari	6	Tahir Raj Bhasin, Nimrat Kaur, Saqib Saleem, Shweta Tripathi, Swanand Kirkire, Kulbhushan Kharbanda, Farida Jalal, Tillotama Shome, Salim Merchant, Mohit Marwah, Saba Azad, Rhea Chakraborty	16 March 2016
2016	Ladies Room	Ashima Chibber	6	Saba Azad, Shreya Dhanwanthary, Auritra Ghosh, Gopal Dutt, Pawan Utam, Jagdish Rajpurohit and others	31 May 2016
2016	Sex Chat With Pappu & Papa	Ashish Patil	5	Anand Tiwari, Kabir Sajid, Sachin Pilgaonkar, Sanjeeda Shaikh, Alka Amin and others	20 July 2016
2019	Pyaar Actually	Ashish Patil	4	Saqib Saleem, Bhumi Pednekar, Riteish Deshmukh, Dipannita Sharma, Kabir Sajid, Tahir Raj Bhasin, Anya Singh, Saurabh Shukla, Supriya Pilgaonkar, Mandira Bedi, Rashi Mal, Dino Morea	18 October 2019
