= Mujhse Fraaandship Karoge =

2011 film by Nupur Asthana

- Promotional poster
- Directed by: Nupur Asthana
- Written by: Anvita Dutt Guptan
- Screenplay by: Rajesh Narasimhan
- Story by: Pooja Desai; Ashish Patil
- Produced by: Ashish Patil
- Starring: Saqib Saleem; Saba Azad; Nishant Dahiya; Tara D'Souza; Harsh Nagar
- Cinematography: Neha Parti Matiyani
- Edited by: Khushboo Agarwal Raj
- Music by: Raghu Dixit
- Production company: Y-Films
- Release date: 14 October 2011
- Running time: 106 minutes
- Country: India
- Language: Hindi

Mujhse Fraaandship Karoge (transl. Will you be friends with me?) is a 2011 Indian Hindi-language romantic comedy film directed by debutante Nupur Asthana, starring debutant actors Saqib Saleem, Saba Azad, Tara D'Souza and Nishant Dahiya in the lead roles. The film is the second production of Y-Films, a subsidiary of Yash Raj Films. It is written by lyricist Anvita Dutt Guptan with a screenplay by Rajesh Narasimhan, based on a story by Pooja Desai and producer Ashish Patil.

== Plot ==
University students Vishal Bhatt and Preity Sen hate each other. Vishal's good-looking best friend Rahul Sareen (Nishant Dahiya) is a singer and is pretty popular amongst the girls in their college. Vishal writes the lyrics for Rahul's songs but never takes any credit for them. Preity is the president of the Photography Club. Preity's good-looking friend Malvika Kelkar is a fashion design student. Malvika's parents live abroad, leading to her stay with Preity and her mother, Arunima. Rahul ignores a lot of friend requests from girls on social networking sites including Facebook and Malvika, similarly, ignores a lot of requests from guys.

Vishal likes Malvika, and Preity likes Rahul. Vishal sends a friend request to Malvika through Rahul's account. Malvika, as usual, ignores the friend request (thinking Rahul is desperate because he sent her a request after only meeting once). Preity, after Malvika leaves, uses her account and accepts the friend request from Rahul. Vishal starts chatting with Malvika, pretending to be Rahul. But he is actually talking to Preity, who is pretending to be Malvika and thinking that she's talking to Rahul. Vishal and Preity are busted by their friends, and they request their friends Rahul and Malvika to go on a date.

Rahul and Malvika start liking each other after seeing that they have a lot in common. They go on a double date, Malvika with Vishal and Preity with Rahul. The college is celebrating its silver jubilee. The theme for the festival is a photographic documentary (idea of Preity) of the romantic history of the college (idea of Vishal). Vishal and Preity have to work together, sorting their differences. They have a lot in common; they are both immature and bicker a lot. Slowly, after spending time together, they both sort out their differences and gradually become friends. At Rahul's birthday party, Vishal finds Rahul kissing Malvika. On seeing this, an enraged Vishal tells Malvika that it was he who had chatted on Facebook with her and not Rahul. It is soon discovered that Preity, too, has overheard the conversation. This angers her, resulting in her telling him that it was not Malvika but her who chatted with him. She admits that she had fallen in love with him, but Vishal is still angry at what he considers his friend Rahul's betrayal. At the college's Silver Jubilee festival, Vishal finally realizes his mistake and tells Preity that he loves her during the event on stage, ending up with them kissing, celebrating the new generation of romance.

== Cast ==
- Saqib Saleem as Vishal Bhatt
- Saba Azad as Preity Sen
- Nishant Dahiya as Rahul Sareen
- Tara D'Souza as Malvika Kelkar
- Suparna Marwah as Arunima Sen, Preity's mother
- Prabal Panjabi as Hacky
- Manasi Rachh as Neha
- Harsh Nagar as Amit Khanna
- Chitrak Bandyopadhyay as Satyavrat "Machoman" Bandyopadhyay
- Zuha Sharma as Rashmi Patel
- Pavan Malhotra as Bhatia Ji (Gurcharan Bhatia)
- Mita Vashisht as Ms. Raghubir

== Production ==
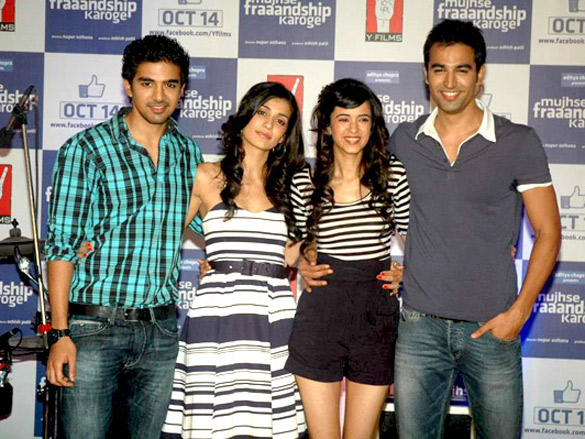
The cast of Mujhse Fraaandship Karoge, from left: Saqib Saleem, Tara D'Souza, Saba Azad, Nishant Dahiya

On 1 April 2011 the film was unveiled publicly as the second production venture of Y-Films and the cast of the film met the press along with the actors from Y-Films' other venture, Luv Ka The End.

== Reception ==
=== Critical response ===
Upon release the film received positive reviews from critics. Deepa Garimella of Fullhyd.com rated it 6 out of 10, stating, "You could watch it once if you're about 18, but those who're older will have to skip it." Taran Adarsh of Bollywood Hungama gave the film 3 out of 5, writing, "On the whole, MUJHSE FRAAANDSHIP KAROGE is engaging, funny, brimming with style and wit. It's for the youth and the young at heart. Go for it!" Vivek Radhakrishnan of The Hindu wrote, "Mujse Fraaandship Karoge, turns out to be a snappy and breezy film that delights."

Shubhra Gupta of The Indian Express gave the film 2.5 out of 5, writing, "Debutant director Nupur Asthana prevents things from getting too cute and precious by keeping her characters as grounded as they can get in a YRF [Yash Raj Films] setting."

== Soundtrack ==
Most of the film's music is composed by Raghu Dixit. Taran Adarsh of Bollywood Hungama gave the soundtrack three stars out of five and praised it for the variety Dixit brought in the five songs he composed. He also said the album has the kind of songs that should not be dependent upon the theatrical run of the movie and is expected to find listeners even after the movie's release.

Track listing
No.	Title	Singer(s)	Length
1.	"Dheaon Dheaon"	Vishal Dadlani, Aditi Singh Sharma, Machas With Attitude (Rap)
2.	"Uh-Oh Uh-Oh!"	Ash King, Shilpa Rao
3.	"Baatein Shuru"	Joi Barua, Shefali Alvaris
4.	"Chu Le"	Suraj Jagan
5.	"Har Saans Main"	Raghu Dixit
6.	"Dheaon Dheaon (The Seeti Seeti Bang Bang Mix)"	Vishal Dadlani, Aditi Singh Sharma
7.	"Uh-Oh Uh-Oh! 2.0"	Ash King, Shilpa Rao
8.	"Chu Le (The Big Bang Mix)"	Suraj Jagan
