= Pammi Somal =

Indian filmmaker and journalist

Pammi Somal (born 3 October 1955) is an Indian filmmaker and Bollywood journalist.

== Biography ==
Pammi Somal studied at Carmel Convent in Chandigarh and earned a Masters in Sociology from Punjab University. After moving to Mumbai, she earned a diplomas in Mass Communication & Journalism, as well as in Creative Writing. She has a master's degree in Reiki along with a degree in Silva Mind Method and Law of Attraction.

Somal has written for various Bollywood magazines and has served as Assistant Editor with Cine Blitz for many years.

In the 1990s, she started writing scripts for television serials and launched a magazine Cafe Celeb in 2003. After functioning as the CEO of a corporate house and President – Business Development for a Singapore-based media company, she started her own production company, Creative Steps Productions, in 2006. Since then, she has produced, written and directed two films: Mummy Punjabi (August 2011) and Na Jaane Kabse (September 2011).

== Filmography ==
=== Television ===
- Ardhangini – 1994 – Writer, Producer
- Sanam – 1996 – Story, Screenplay, Dialogues
- Neeyat – 1999 – Story, Screenplay, Dialogues
- Kasauti – 2000 – Story, Screenplay, Dialogues
- Naqaab – 2000 – Story, Screenplay, Dialogues
- Siski – 2001 – Screenplay
- Hare Kaanch Ki Churiaan (Telefilm) – 2001 – Story, Screenplay, Dialogues
- Na Jaane Kyun – 2001 – Story, Dialogues
- Sukanya – 2002 – Dialogues
- Samay ki Dhadkan – 2002 – Story, Screenplay, Dialogues
- Naata – 2002 – Story, Screenplay, Dialogues
- Muskurahat – 2002 – Story, Screenplay, Dialogues

=== Films ===
- The Perfect Husband (English) – 2002 – Dialogues
- Mummy Punjabi (English / Hindi) – 2011 – Writer, Director, Producer
- Na Jaane Kabse (Hindi) – 2011 – Writer, Director, Producer
