= Mere Brother Ki Dulhan =

2011 Indian film by Ali Abbas Zafar

- Theatrical release poster
- Directed by: Ali Abbas Zafar
- Written by: Ali Abbas Zafar
- Produced by: Aditya Chopra
- Starring: Imran Khan; Katrina Kaif; Ali Zafar; Tara D'Souza
- Cinematography: Sudeep Chatterjee
- Edited by: Ritesh Soni
- Music by: Sohail Sen
- Production company: Yash Raj Films
- Distributed by: Yash Raj Films
- Release date: 9 September 2011
- Running time: 145 minutes
- Country: India
- Language: Hindi

Mere Brother Ki Dulhan (transl. My Brother's Bride) is a 2011 Indian Hindi-language romantic comedy film written and directed by Ali Abbas Zafar in his directorial debut, and produced by Aditya Chopra under the Yash Raj Films banner. The film stars Imran Khan, Katrina Kaif, Ali Zafar, and Tara D'Souza. In the film, Kush Agnihotri (Khan) is asked to find a suitable bride for his brother, Luv (Zafar) and reconnects with Dimple Dixit (Kaif), an eccentric and spirited woman from his past, and arranges her engagement to Luv—only for complications to arise when he and Dimple develop feelings for each other before the wedding.

The film marked Khan's first collaboration with Yash Raj Films, and the second for both Kaif and Zafar after New York (2009). It also marked the Bollywood debut of Ali Zafar and D’Souza. Development began in August 2010, after Zafar, then an assistant director at the studio, pitched multiple scripts. Principal photography took place from September to November 2010 across several locations including Delhi, Haryana, Punjab, Uttarakhand, Uttar Pradesh, and Himachal Pradesh.

Originally slated for release in July 2011, the film was postponed and premiered theatrically on 9 September 2011. Mere Brother Ki Dulhan received positive reviews from critics, with praise directed at the lead performances, humor, screenplay, and soundtrack. The film emerged as a commercial success, grossing ₹856 million (US$10 million) worldwide. At the 57th Filmfare Awards, the film earned two nominations: Best Actress (Kaif) and Best Music Director (Sohail Sen).

== Plot ==
After ending his relationship with his girlfriend, Piyali Patel, in London, Luv Agnihotri asks his younger brother, Kush—a Mumbai-based assistant film director and photographer—to find him a suitable bride. Kush returns to Dehradun to meet his parents, retired army officer Colonel Swarnik Agnihotri and homemaker Kanak. Together, they travel across India for brides found through Swarnik's connections in search of a potential match for Luv, but without success. At the suggestion of Kush's friends, the family places a matrimonial advertisement in a newspaper.

They receive a response from Dilip Dixit who is working in Foreign Office, a father seeking a groom for his daughter. When the Agnihotris visit the Dixit family in Delhi, Kush is surprised to discover that the prospective bride is Dimple Dixit, a free-spirited and outspoken woman he had briefly met five years earlier during a college trip. Despite their contrasting personalities, Kush encourages Dimple to consider the match. After meeting Luv online, Dimple agrees to the marriage. Her brother Ajay decides the wedding should take place in Agra with a view of the Taj Mahal.

As preparations begin, Kush realizes he has developed feelings for Dimple. On the advice of his best friend, he confesses his love. Dimple, who had tried to signal her own feelings earlier, initially reacts with frustration but eventually reciprocates. Dimple decides that elopement is their only option but Kush disagrees prompting Dimple to mix sleeping pills in his water and then run away. When Kush wakes up he convinces Dimple that this is not the right way as they will be estranged from their families for life. They along with Ajay and Kush's friends devise a plan to reunite Luv with Piyali. Dimple invites Piyali to the wedding under the pretense of being a childhood friend. Luv and Piyali reconnect and elope the next day, later informing both families through letters.

In the aftermath, Swarnik and Dilip initially quarrel but ultimately agree to save face by arranging a marriage between Kush and Dimple. Kush consents on the condition that Luv and Piyali are accepted by both families. The request is granted, and both couples are married in a grand joint ceremony.

== Cast ==
- Imran Khan as Kush Agnihotri
- Katrina Kaif as Dimple "D" Dixit
- Ali Zafar as Luv Agnihotri "Bhaisaab"
- Tara D'Souza as Piyali "Piya" Patel
- Parikshit Sahni as Colonel Swarnik Agnihotri
- Kanwaljit Singh as Dilip Dixit
- Suparna Marwah as Kanak Agnihotri
- Marhu Sheikh as Lata Dixit
- Arfeen Khan as Ajay Dixit
- Mohammed Zeeshan Ayyub as Shobhit
- Tariq Vasudeva as Rohit
- Ayesha Khanna as Tina
- Sufi Malhotra as Robin
- Karmveer Choudhary as Hariyanvi girl's father
- Brijendra Kala as Salman Bhai
- John Abraham in a special appearance as himself
- Iain Fraser as Scottish tourist pushing airport cart
- Kyra Dutt in a special song appearance in the title track

== Production ==
=== Development ===
Yash Raj Films announced the then-untitled project on 5 August 2010. The film marked the directorial and writing debut of Ali Abbas Zafar, who had previously served as an assistant director on several Yash Raj Films productions including Jhoom Barabar Jhoom (2007), Tashan (2008), New York (2009), and Badmaash Company (2010). Lead actor Imran Khan described the film as a "comedy of errors." Following the studio's prior success with debutant director Maneesh Sharma on Band Baaja Baaraat (2010), this became the second consecutive Yash Raj production to be helmed by a first-time filmmaker formerly employed by the company.

Zafar, a native of Dehradun—where a portion of the narrative is set—submitted three romantic storylines to producer Aditya Chopra. Mere Brother Ki Dulhan was eventually selected for development, after which Zafar began work on the screenplay, which spanned 150 pages. Prior to entering the film industry, Zafar had been active in theatre and was associated with The Players, the drama society of Kirori Mal College at Delhi University.

In the months leading up to release, the film drew comparisons to the American romantic comedy Dan in Real Life (2007), in which a man falls in love with his brother's partner. It was also likened to Mere Yaar Ki Shaadi Hai (2002), an earlier Yash Raj production with similar narrative elements.

=== Casting ===
The casting of Imran Khan and Katrina Kaif in the lead roles was announced concurrently with the film's initial press release. Though this marked their first on-screen pairing, the two actors had previously been signed to appear in the indefinitely postponed 7 Days in Paris, directed by Sanjay Gadhvi. Khan made his debut for Yash Raj with this film, while Kaif had earlier collaborated with the studio on New York (2009), where she worked with Zafar, then serving as assistant director. Her availability for Mere Brother Ki Dulhan arose following delays in the production of Dostana 2. The role was reported as a departure from Kaif's previous screen personas.

The part of Luv Agnihotri was played by singer-actor Ali Zafar (no relation to the director), marking his second Bollywood appearance following critical praise for Tere Bin Laden (2010). He announced his involvement via social media and referred to the casting as "a dream come true." Zafar also performed the singing for his character in the film, which he described as a "parallel lead role." The cast also included newcomer Tara D’Souza, a former Kingfisher model, in a supporting role.

On 17 October 2010, multiple media outlets reported that Preity Zinta had been cast in an unspecified "glamorous role," but the actress refuted these claims on Twitter the same day.

=== Filming ===
Principal photography began on 25 September 2010, with the initial schedule based in Pataudi, followed by shoots in Chandigarh, Agra, Dehradun, Mussoorie, Haridwar, Dhanaulti, Punjab, and Himachal Pradesh. Filming spanned 45 days across northern India before concluding in Mumbai. Kaif joined the production on 27 September, while also balancing her commitments to Tees Maar Khan (2010) and Zindagi Na Milegi Dobara (2011).

During the early days of filming, on 29 September 2010, Kaif sustained a minor nose injury during a comic scene shot at Pataudi Palace, when a prop gun handled by Khan accidentally struck her face. She later clarified the incident as unintentional, stating, "These things happen... It was one of the really madcap scenes."

In another on-set occurrence, Kaif slapped Khan multiple times for a scene that required numerous retakes at Khan's request, to offer the director a variety of options. Later, during filming in Nabha, Kaif's hair became entangled in a fan. The situation was quickly controlled by co-star Ali Zafar and a crew member, who both sustained minor injuries in the process.

The film's official title, Mere Brother Ki Dulhan, was announced on 2 October 2010, accompanied by promotional stills. Ahead of the release, Zafar stated that Kaif had promised to appear in a music video with him if the film earned more than ₹600 million at the box office.

== Soundtrack ==
The film's soundtrack and background score were composed by Sohail Sen, with lyrics written by Irshad Kamil. The album consists of six original tracks and two remixes, and was released on 10 August 2011 under the Yash Raj Music label.

Among the songs, "Madhubala"—sung by cast member Ali Zafar and picturised on Katrina Kaif—served as a tribute to the iconic Hindi film actress Madhubala.

== Release ==
Yash Raj Films initially targeted a July 2011 release for Mere Brother Ki Dulhan. However, the release was later postponed to 16 September 2011. In a notable shift from the studio's traditionally guarded promotional strategy, the title and initial promotional stills were made public just one week into production—an approach that contrasted with their previous practice of delaying such announcements until closer to the film's release.

The film was released theatrically in Pakistan on 9 September 2011, ahead of its Indian premiere.

== Reception ==
=== Box office ===
Mere Brother Ki Dulhan opened to strong box office collections in India, earning ₹75 million net on its first day. Over its opening weekend, the film collected ₹255 million net, and held steadily on Monday with an additional ₹37.5 million, bringing its four-day total to ₹290 million net. By the end of its first week, it had grossed ₹378 million (US$4.5 million) net domestically. The film concluded its theatrical run in India with a total net collection of ₹772 million (US$9.1 million), contributing to a worldwide gross of ₹938 million (US$11 million) against a production budget of ₹320 million (US$3.8 million).

Internationally, the film earned approximately ₹200 million (US$2.4 million) from overseas markets.

=== Critical reception ===
Mere Brother Ki Dulhan received generally positive reviews from critics, with particular praise directed at Katrina Kaif’s performance, the music, and the film’s lighthearted tone.

Taran Adarsh of Bollywood Hungama gave the film 4 out of 5 stars, describing it as "a delectably wholesome, heartening, feel-good entertainer." India Weekly also awarded the film 4 out of 5 stars. Dainik Bhaskar rated it 3 out of 5 stars, calling it "a treat for Katrina's fans, as it will be an experience to witness her talent."

Komal Nahta of Koimoi gave the film 3 out of 5 stars, noting its "reasonable entertainment value, very good music, and exciting song picturisations," though he also mentioned that "the screenplay dips at a few places; a few comic scenes seem forced." Sukanya Verma of Rediff.com rated it 3.5 out of 5 stars, writing, "Mere Brother Ki Dulhan is a pretty ordinary effort," but commended its energetic performances. Kaveree Bamzai of India Today gave the film the same score, noting that "a large part of the film is a spoof" with mixed success.

In a more critical take, Gaurav Malani of The Times of India felt the screenplay did not fully explore its potential and wrote that "the writing is shallow and resorts to a convenient climax." Krita Coelho of Gulf News described it as a film to "watch if you're a sucker for a sweet Bollywood romance." Reuters referred to the film as "a fun, good one-time watch" for viewers willing to overlook certain flaws.

Rahul Gangwani of Filmfare gave the film 3 out of 5 stars, remarking that "the film ultimately belongs to Kaif. She sparkles, sizzles and infuses energy into the film," citing a scene in which she mimics a shehnai rendition from Swades as a standout. Conversely, Rajeev Masand of CNN-IBN rated the film 2 out of 5, writing, "The film doesn't always work because it relies too heavily on silly stereotypes and clichés, and because you can see exactly where it's going from the moment you settle into your seat."

Other publications such as Hamara Bollywood also responded positively, with the outlet awarding 4 out of 5 stars and stating that Kaif's performance alone "is worth paying the admission price."

== Accolades ==
| Award | Date of the ceremony | Category | Recipients | Result | Ref. |
|---|---|---|---|---|---|
| Producers Guild Film Awards | 27 January 2012 | Best Actress in a Leading Role | Katrina Kaif | Nominated | |
| Producers Guild Film Awards | 27 January 2012 | Best Female Playback Singer | Neha Bhasin (for "Dhunki") | Nominated | |
| Filmfare Awards | 29 January 2012 | Best Actress | Katrina Kaif | Nominated | |
| Filmfare Awards | 29 January 2012 | Best Music Director | Sohail Sen | Nominated | |
| Stardust Awards | 10 February 2012 | Actor of the Year – Female | Katrina Kaif | Nominated | |
| Stardust Awards | 10 February 2012 | Best Actress in a Comedy or Romance | Katrina Kaif | Nominated | |
| Stardust Awards | 10 February 2012 | Superstar of Tomorrow – Male | Ali Zafar | Won | |
| Screen Awards | 14 February 2012 | Best Actor (Popular Choice) | Imran Khan | Nominated | |
| Screen Awards | 14 February 2012 | Best Actress (Popular Choice) | Katrina Kaif | Nominated | |
| IIFA Awards | 7–9 June 2012 | Best Music Director | Sohail Sen | Nominated | |
