= Saba Azad =

Indian actress, director and musician

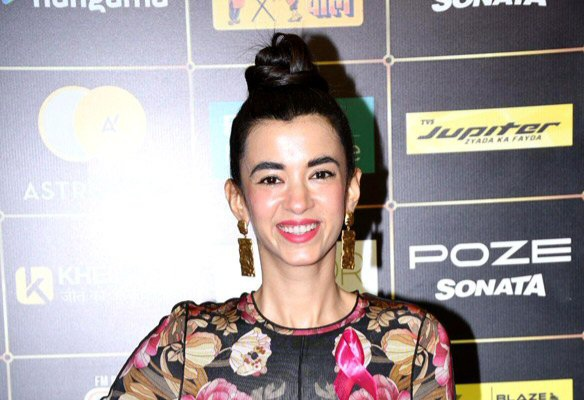
- Azad in 2023
- Born: Saba Singh Grewal; 1 November 1985 (age 41); Delhi, India
- Occupations: Actress; musician; voice artist; theatre director
- Years active: 2008–present
- Partners: Imaad Shah (2013–2020); Hrithik Roshan (2022–present)
- Relatives: Safdar Hashmi (uncle); Sohail Hashmi (uncle); Shabnam Hashmi (aunt)

Saba Azad (born Saba Singh Grewal; 1 November 1985) is an Indian actress, theatre director and musician. She made her Bollywood debut as one of the leads Raaga in the indie film Dil Kabaddi (2008). She is known for her leading role in the romantic comedy film Mujhse Fraaandship Karoge (2011). She also played the role of Dingo in the 2016 Y-Films web series, Ladies Room. She is one half of the Mumbai-based electronic band duo Madboy/Mink.

== Early life ==
Azad was born on 1 November 1985 in Delhi to a Punjabi Sikh father and a Muslim mother with ancestries from Kashmir, Uttar Pradesh and Delhi. In an interview, she said that she had a multicultural upbringing. She is the niece of theatre great Safdar Hashmi. Azad performed with Safdar Hashmi's theatre group Jana Natya Manch in their stage productions from a very young age, where she worked with Habib Tanvir, MK Raina, G.P. Deshpande and NK Sharma. She is trained in Odissi and other dance forms. Travelling with her Odissi guru, Kiran Segal, she performed in and outside the country. Her stint with cinema started after schooling when she landed a lead role in a short film Guroor, for director Ishaan Nair, which travelled to festivals in New York and Florence.

== Career ==
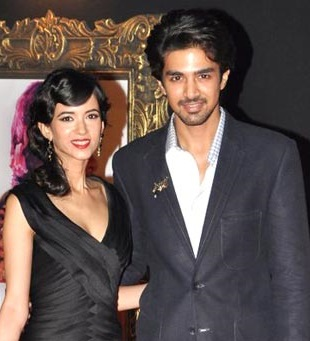
Saba Azad with Saqib Saleem at the premier of Mujhse Fraaandship Karoge, 2011.

She made her Bollywood debut in 2008 with Anil Senior's Dil Kabaddi opposite Rahul Bose. She appeared in a leading role as Preity Sen in Y-Films Mujhse Fraaandship Karoge opposite newcomers Nishant Dahiya and Saqib Saleem.

Azad is a musician and singer in the Indian indie electronic band Madboy/Mink which she started with actor and musician Imaad Shah in 2012.

Azad started her own theatre company The Skins in 2010 and directed her first play Lovepuke which opened at NCPA's experimental theatre in September 2010.

Azad moved to Mumbai from Delhi and acted in a two-man play directed by Makarand Deshpande staged at Prithvi Theatre.

She has featured in commercials for Cadbury, Pond's, Maggi, Tata Sky, Google, Kit Kat, Vodafone, Sunsilk, Nescafe, Airtel as well as print campaigns for Clean & Clear, Westside and Amway and many more.

== Personal life ==
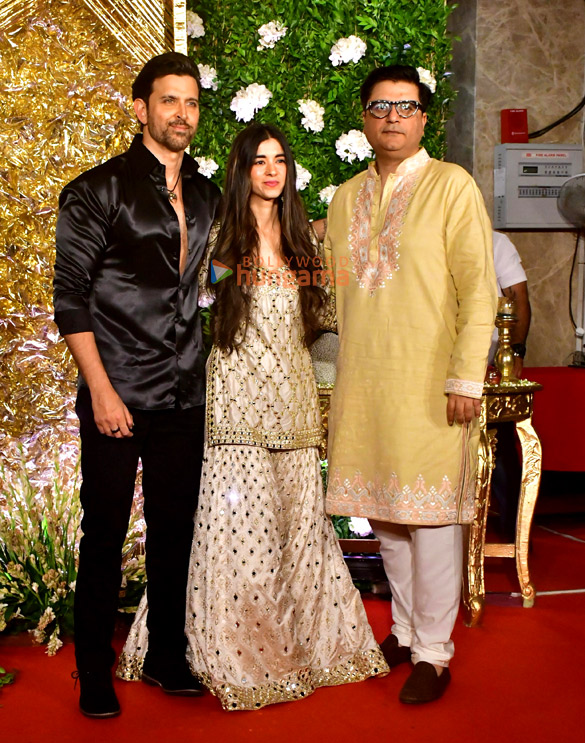
Azad with Hrithik Roshan (left) and Ramesh Taurani (right) at Taurani's Diwali bash 2025

Azad was in a live-in relationship with Imaad Shah from 2013 to 2020. However they remain friends after their break-up and make music together for their band Mad Boy Mink.

Since 2022, she has been dating Hrithik Roshan.

== Filmography ==
Key
†	Denotes films that have not yet been released

=== Film ===
Year	Title	Role	Notes
2008	Dil Kabaddi	Raga Malik	
2011	Mujhse Fraaandship Karoge	Preity Sen	
2012	Strangers in the Night	Rhea	Short film
2016	Pure-Veg	Anjali	Short film
2019	Connected	Saba	Short film
2020	Home stories	Vaishnavi	Netflix
2024	Minimum	Laurie	
2025	Songs of Paradise	Zeba Akhtar / Noor Begum	
2025	Bandar	Khushi	Monkey in a Cage at TIFF

=== Web series ===
Year	Title	Role	Streaming service	Notes
2016	Ladies room	Dingo	YRF	Web series
2016	Love Shots	Preeti	YRF	Limited series
2021	Feels Like Ishq	Tarasha Ahmed	Netflix	Anthology web series; Episode: "She Loves Me, She Loves Me Not"
2022	Rocket Boys	Parvana Irani "Pipsy"	Sony LIV	Biographical streaming television
2023	Who's Your Gynac	Dr. Vidushi	Amazon Prime	Miniseries
2025	Crime Beat	Maya Kapoor	ZEE5	Web series

== Discography ==
Year	Album	Title	Co-singers
2013	Nautanki Saala	"Dhak Dhak Karne Laga" "Dil Ki Toh Lag Gayi"	Geet Sagar, Bruno Carvalo, Santosh Sawant
2013	Dhoom Series	"Dhoom Anthem"	Raghav Sachar
2014	Madboy/Mink	"All Ball"	
2015	Detective Byomkesh Bakshy!	"Calcutta Kiss"	Imaad Shah
2015	Shaandaar	"Neend Na Mujhko Aaye"	Siddharth Basrur
2015	Main Aur Charles	"Dekhe Meri Aankhon Mein Jo"	
2015	Madboy/Mink	"Union Farm"	
2018	Karwaan	"Bhar De Hamaare Glass"	
2018	Madboy/Mink	"Persons.Elastic.Superior.Fantastic (P.E.S.F)"	
2019	Mard Ko Dard Nahi Hota	"Nakhrewaali"	Karan Kulkarni
2023	Farzi	"Sab Farzi"	Amazon Web series
2023	Kho Gaye Hum Kaha	"I wanna see you dance"	Netflix original movie
