= Anita Devgan =

Indian actress

- Born: Anita Devgan; Amritsar, Punjab, India
- Occupations: Actress, theatre artist

Anita Devgan is an Indian film and television actress, who is known for her work in the Punjabi film industry. Her most well-known works are the films Jatt & Juliet, Ronde Sare Vyah Picho, Angrej, Bambukat, Rabb Da Radio, Golak Bugni Bank Te Batua, Mr. & Mrs. 420 Returns, Puaada, and Ni Main Sass Kuttni.

== Early life and education ==
Anita grew up in Amritsar, Punjab, India. She done her schooling and college from Government Middle School, Chicha, Amritsar and Khalsa College for Women, Amritsar Punjab University, Patiala, India. After completion of her college study she acquired her Bachelor of Arts (B.A.) Master in Arts (M.A.) from Punjab University, Patiala, India.

== Career ==
Anita is a theatre performer from Punjab who works in the Punjabi film industry. She began her acting career in mid 90's on Jalandhar Doordarshan through popular Serial’ "Panchni" (ਪੰਚਨੀ). "Panchni" serial was big hit with 60 plus episodes and Anita played the leading role in this serial. Her other well known serials on Jalandhar Doordarshan are "Lorie" and "Hakim Tara Chand". Hashar (2008), a love story was her first Punjabi film, and she has since appeared in more than 40 films in supporting roles. Additionally, she received the Virasat International Punjabi Film Award and the Best Supporting Actress PTC Punjabi Film Award.

Her most famous films include Jatt & Juliet (2012, 2013), R.S.V.P., Angrej (2015), Bambukat (2016), Rabb Da Radio (2017, 2019), Golak Bugni Bank Te Batua (2018), Mr. & Mrs. 420 Returns (2018), Puaada (2021), and Ni Main Sass Kuttni (2022). In the film Ni Main Sass Kuttni, she appeared with actors Nirmal Rishi, Gurpreet Ghuggi, Karamjit Anmol, and Mehtab Virk in a lead role.

== Filmography ==
- Hashar A Love Story (2008)as Chachi
- Panjaban-Love Rules Hearts (2010) as Gugni's mother
- Jatt & Juliet (2012) as
- Jatt & Juliet 2 (2013) as Fateh's mom
- Fer Mamla Gadbad Gadbad (2013) as Timmy's Mother
- Ronde Sare Vyah Picho (2013) as
- Mundeyan Ton Bachke Rahin (2014) as Prince's mother
- Proper Patola (2014) as Mad Lady
- Angrej (2015) as
- Judge Singh LLB (2015) as Sonu's Mother
- Kaptaan (2016) as
- Bambukat (2016) as Channan's mother
- Judaiyaan (2017) as
- Thug Life (2017) as MLA's Mother
- Rabb Da Radio (2017)
- Nikka Zaildar 2 (2017) as Saawan's mother
- Punjab Singh (2018) as
- Golak Bugni Bank Te Batua (2018) as Usha
- Jatt vs. Ielts (2018) as
- Jagga Jiunda E (2018) as
- Yamla Pagla Deewana Phir Se (2018) as Sati
- Kurmaiyan (2018) as
- Laatu (2018) as Jailo
- Marriage Palace (2018) as Nimma's Bhua
- Kala Shah Kala (2019) as Satwant Kaur
- Shadaa (2019) as Chadta's mother
- Singham (2019) as
- Jaddi Sardar (2019) as Mindo
- Tara Mira (2019) as Mira's Bua
- Kitty Party (2019) as
- Jinde Meriye (2020) as Surjeet Kaur
- Puaada (2021) as Jaggi's mother
- Teeja Punjab (2021) as Sarpanch's wife
- Jatt Brothers (2022) as
- Umran Ch Ki Rakheya (2022) as Kanwal's friend
- Ni Main Sass Kuttni (2022) as
- Mahi Mera Nikka Jeha (2022) as Guddu – Noor's Mother
- Sass Meri Ne Munda Jamya (2022) as
- Rabba Rabba Meeh Varsa I (2022) as
- Rabba Rabba Meeh Varsa II (2022) as
- Kali Jotta (2023) as
- Tu Hovein Main Hovan (2023) as Kelly's Mother
- Ji Wife Ji (2023) as

== Awards ==
Year	Award	Category	Result	Work	Ref.
2018	Filmfare Awards Punjab	Best Supporting Actress	Nominated	Rabb Da Radio	
2020	PTC Punjabi Film Awards	Best Supporting Actress	Won	Jaddi Sardar (2019)	
2020	Virasat International Punjabi Film Award.	Acting	Won		
