= Jaspreet Jasz =

Indian singer

- Born: New Delhi, India
- Genres: Playback singing
- Occupations: Singer, songwriter
- Instruments: Vocals
- Years active: 2006–present

Jaspreet Jasz (born Jaspreet Singh Kohli in New Delhi, India) is an Indian singer whose vocals have been featured in Bollywood and Telugu cinema, as well as advertisement jingles. He won recognition through the music reality television series Indian Idol.

== Early years ==
Jasz began to sing at the age of four and would perform in functions and competitions. As a child, he would riyaaz, practicing guitar and harmonium while others of his age would play outside. During his teenage years he won various trophies and awards for performing in his school band as the lead vocalist.

== Career ==
Jasz moved to Mumbai soon after college as a result of the exposure he received on Indian Idol. He stepped into the world of playback singing in 2006 with the Bollywood film, Dil Kabaddi. He followed with his first project with A.R. Rahman, the title track of the movie Blue.

Jasz was introduced to a global audience with Rahman's "Nimma Nimma" which featured in the Isles of Wonder sequence directed by Danny Boyle at the 2012 Summer Olympics.

== Discography ==
=== Hindi songs ===
Year	Film	Song	Music director
2008	Dil Kabaddi	Ehsaan	Sachin Gupta
2009	Blue (2009 film)	Blue Theme	A. R. Rahman
2009	Three – Love, Lies and Betrayal	This Beat Is Really Thumping	Chirantan Bhatt
2010	Hide & Seek	Friday Night	Chirantan Bhatt
2010	Shaapit	Chahta Kitna Tum	Chirantan Bhatt
2010	Tere Bin Laden	Kukduk	Shankar–Ehsaan–Loy
2011	Sahi Dhandhe Galat Bande	Baraf Main Tension	Dhruv Dhalla
2011	Jo Hum Chahein	Peepni	Sachin Gupta
2012	Will You Marry Me	Supermen	Sachin Gupta
2012	Ek Deewana Tha	Dost Hai	A. R. Rahman
2013	Table No. 21	Kal Kare So Aaj Kar	Sachin Gupta
2013	Mere Dad Ki Maruti	Main Senti Hoon	Sachin Gupta
2014	O Teri	Butt Patlo	GJ Singh
2014	O Teri	Ummbakum	GJ Singh
2014	O Teri	Ankha Vich	GJ Singh

=== Telugu songs ===
Year	Film	Song	Music director
2011	Dhada	"Ye Pilla Pilla"	Devi Sri Prasad
2011	Oosaravelli	"Yelango Yelango"	Devi Sri Prasad
2012	Damarukam	"Kanyakumari"	Devi Sri Prasad
2013	Naayak	"Nellore"	S. Thaman
2013	Mirchi	"Barbie Girl"	Devi Sri Prasad
2013	Baadshah	"Welcome Kanakam"	S. Thaman
2013	Toofan	"Mumbai Ke Hero"	Meet Bros
2014	Chinnadana Nee Kosam	"Everybody Chalo"	Anup Rubens
2014	Loukyam	"Pink Lips"	Anup Rubens
2014	Manam	"Piyo Piyo Rey"	Anup Rubens
2014	Alludu Seenu	"Oh Bujji Konda"	Devi Sri Prasad
2015	Pataas	"Arey O Samba"	Sai Karthik
2015	Rey	"Dance"	Chakri
2016	Supreme	"Taxiwala"	Sai Karthik
2017	Khaidi No. 150	"Sundari"	Devi Sri Prasad
2017	Duvvada Jagannadham	"Seeti Maar"	Devi Sri Prasad
2017	Jai Lava Kusa	"Tring Tring"	Devi Sri Prasad
2017	Middle Class Abbayi	"Family Party"	Devi Sri Prasad
2018	Jai Simha	"Ammakutti Ammakutti"	Chirrantan Bhatt
2018	Amar Akbar Anthony	"Don Bosco"	S. Thaman
2018	Inttelligent	"Naa Cell Phone"	S. Thaman
2019	Vinaya Vidheya Rama	"Thassadiyya"	Devi Sri Prasad
2021	Alludu Adhurs	"Hola Chica"	Devi Sri Prasad
2021	Alludu Adhurs	"Alludu Adhurs"	Devi Sri Prasad
2021	Uppena	"Jala Jala Jalapaatham"	Devi Sri Prasad
2022	Induvadana	"Chilipi Chupulu"	Siva Kakani
2022	Rowdy Boys	"Preme Aakasamaithe"	Devi Sri Prasad
2022	Good Luck Sakhi	"Yegire Thiranga Janda"	Devi Sri Prasad
2022	Khiladi	"Catch Me"	Devi Sri Prasad
2022	Aadavallu Meeku Johaarlu	"Mangalayam"	Devi Sri Prasad
2023	Waltair Veerayya	"Sridevi Chiranjeevi"	Devi Sri Prasad

== Awards and nominations ==
- Nominated for "Best Playback Singer" in Maa Music Awards 2013.
- Nominated for "Fresh New Voice" in Mirchi Music Awards 2011.
