= Aman Gill =

Film Producer

- Born: Vancouver, British Columbia, Canada
- Occupation: Film Producer
- Years active: 2003–present

Aman Gill is a film producer born and raised in Vancouver, British Columbia now based in Mumbai, India. He has his ancestral roots hailing from Ludhiana, Punjab.

== Career ==
He started his career at Applause Entertainment where he was the AVP of Content from 2003 to 2006. He worked as an Executive Producer on Sanjay Leela Bhansali's Black. In 2006, he joined Viacom18 Studios where he acted as the Head of Domestic Distribution of films such as Ghajini, Golmaal Returns, Singh Is Kinng, Welcome, Jab We Met and Namastey London. In 2012, he joined the talent agency CAA-Kwan where he set up their film talent and literary business. In 2014, he joined Junglee Pictures as the Chief Content Officer where he overlooked films such as Dil Dhadakne Do and Talvar. In 2015, he joined Balaji Motion Pictures as the CEO of Films, where he was responsible for film development, creative, production, marketing, distribution, and syndication. During his time at Balaji Motion Films, he produced films such as Udta Punjab, A Flying Jatt, Azhar, Kya Kool Hain Hum 3 and Great Grand Masti.

In 2022, he produced Jersey starring Shahid Kapoor. In 2023, he produced Shehzada starring Kartik Aaryan.

== Personal life ==
He has a twin brother Pawan Gill, who also works in the film industry as a producer and filmmaker. He has produced several films including Puaada, Shadaa, Super Singh and Honsla Rakh.

== Filmography ==
Year	Film	Role	Company
2005	Black	Executive Producer	Applause Entertainment
2007	1971	Head of Domestic Distribution	Viacom18 Studios
2007	Namastey London	Head of Domestic Distribution	Viacom18 Studios
2007	Awarapan	Head of Domestic Distribution	Viacom18 Studios
2007	Jab We Met	Head of Domestic Distribution	Viacom18 Studios
2007	Welcome	Head of Domestic Distribution	Viacom18 Studios
2008	Singh Is Kinng	Head of Domestic Distribution	Viacom18 Studios
2008	Kidnap	Head of Domestic Distribution	Viacom18 Studios
2008	Golmaal Returns	Head of Domestic Distribution	Viacom18 Studios
2008	Little Zizou	Head of Domestic Distribution	Viacom18 Studios
2008	Dil Kabaddi	Head of Domestic Distribution	Viacom18 Studios
2008	Ghajini	Head of Domestic Distribution	Viacom18 Studios
2009	Short Kut	Head of Domestic Distribution	Viacom18 Studios
2009	Luck	Head of Domestic Distribution	Viacom18 Studios
2009	Life Partner	Head of Domestic Distribution	Viacom18 Studios
2009	Road, Movie	Head of Domestic Distribution	Viacom18 Studios
2009	Fruit and Nut	Head of Domestic Distribution	Viacom18 Studios
2010	Striker	Head of Domestic Distribution	Viacom18 Studios
2010	Hum Tum Aur Ghost	Head of Domestic Distribution	Viacom18 Studios
2011	Jo Hum Chahein	Producer	Gill Pictures Entertainment
2014	Mundeyan Ton Bachke Rahin	Producer	Gill Pictures Entertainment
2015	Dil Dhadakne Do	SVP Content	Junglee Pictures
2015	Bangistan	SVP Content	Junglee Pictures
2015	Talvar	SVP Content	Junglee Pictures
2016	Kyaa Kool Hain Hum 3	Producer	Balaji Motion Pictures
2016	Azhar	Producer	Balaji Motion Pictures
2016	Udta Punjab	Producer	Balaji Motion Pictures
2016	Great Grand Masti	Producer	Balaji Motion Pictures
2016	A Flying Jatt	Producer	Balaji Motion Pictures
2017	Super Singh	Producer	Balaji Motion Pictures
2019	Shadaa	Producer	Brat Films
2021	Puaada	Producer	Brat Films
2022	Jersey	Producer	Brat Films
2022	Shehzada	Producer	Brat Films

== Awards ==
=== Won ===
- PTC Punjabi Film Awards 2020 - Best Entertainer Film of the Year Award Shadaa

=== Nominated ===
- PTC Punjabi Film Awards 2020 - Best Film Shadaa
- PTC Punjabi Film Awards 2018 - Best Film Super Singh
