= Omkar Kapoor =

Indian actor

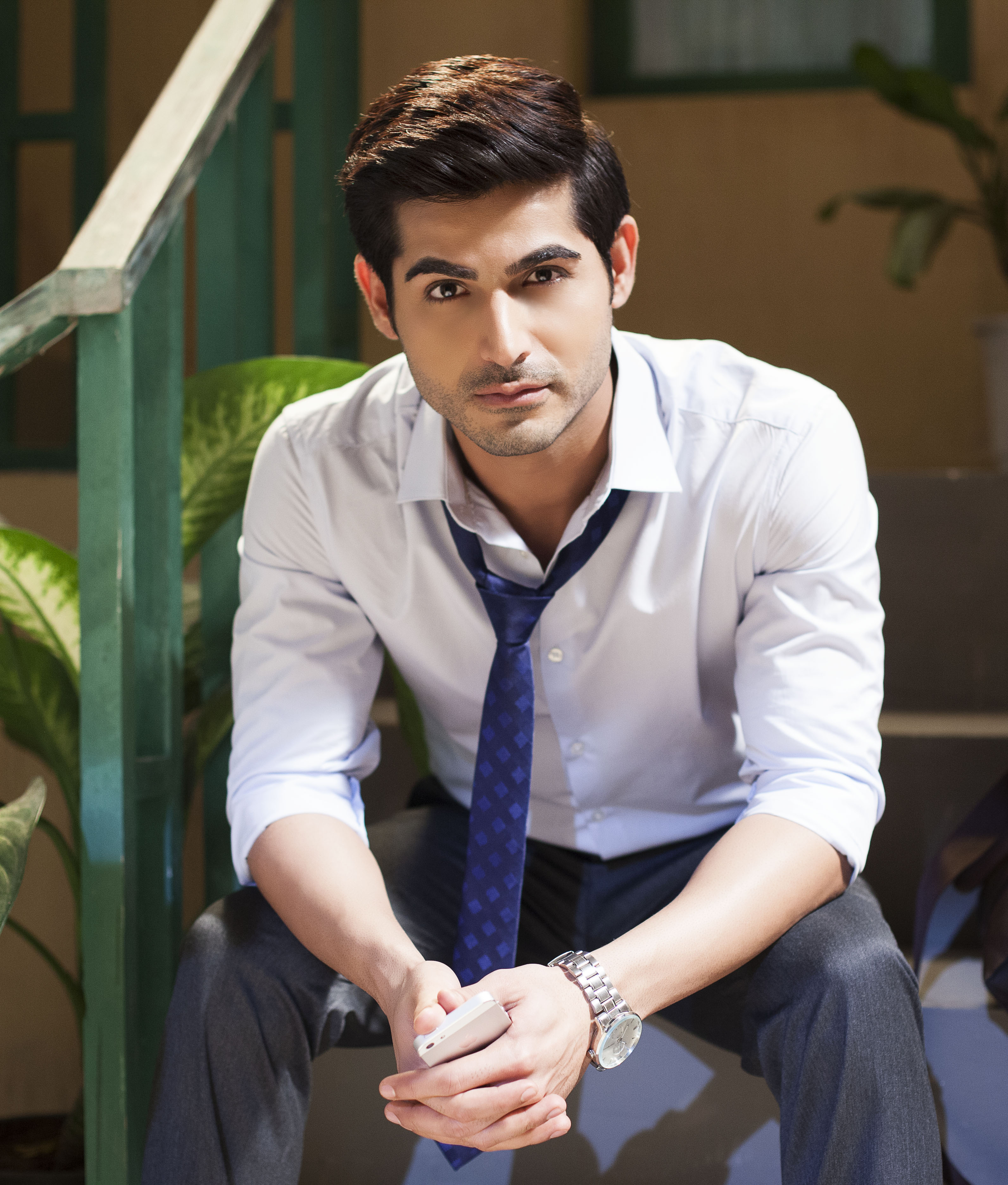
- Kapoor in 2015
- Occupations: Actor; model
- Years active: 1996–2002; 2015–present

Omkar Kapoor is an Indian actor who works in the Bollywood film industry. He began his performing career as a child artist and worked in films like Judwaa, Hero No.1 and Judaai. He made his Bollywood debut as a Parallel Lead actor with his movie Pyaar Ka Punchnama 2.

== Career ==
Omkar Kapoor assisted Bollywood directors like Sanjay Leela Bhansali, Farah Khan and Ahmed Khan, but he really wanted to be an actor and hence gave many auditions, of which he bagged Pyaar Ka Punchnama 2. In 2017, Kapoor starred as Mithilesh Chaturvedi in the web film U, Me Aur Ghar alongside Simran Kaur Mundi. In 2018, he starred as Ankush Patel aka Maggie in the Viu original series Kaushiki.

In 2019, he starred as Varun Kumar Pandey in the comedy film Jhootha Kahin Ka. Kapoor starred as Purva in the ZEE5 web series Bhoot Purva. He also played the supporting role in web series Bhram. In 2020, Kapoor played the role of Neel in the Zee5 short film Forbidden Love: Arranged Marriage. In 2021, Kapoor starred as Dr. Abhijit Verma in the MX Player web series Bisaat alongside Sandeepa Dhar, which was directed by Vikram Bhatt.

In 2023, he starred as Satyansh in the film Lavaste, which depicts the silent agony of unidentified corpses in our culture. In 2024, Kapoor played the role of Siddhanth in Sony SAB show Aangan - Aapno Kaa. He starred as Vikram in the Pocket FM audio series Shaadi Ke Baad. Later that year, he also starred as Vishal Singh in the short film Button.

== Filmography ==
=== Films ===
Year	Title	Role	Notes	Ref.
1996	Masoom	Kishan	Debut as child artist	
1996	Ek Ladki Pyari Pyari			
1996	Chaahat	Vicky		
1997	Hero No. 1	Shekhar Jeevannath Tripathi		
1997	Judwaa	Young Raja		
1997	Judaai	Romi Verma		
1997	Ghoonghat			
1998	Sham Ghansham			
1999	International Khiladi	Young Devraj		
2000	Mela	Gopal		
2000	Aaj Ka Nanha Farishta	Suraj		
2000	Ek Ajooba	Bakiya		
2002	Dil Churaya Apne			
2015	Pyaar Ka Punchnama 2	Tarun Thakur	Debut as lead artist	
2017	U, Me Aur Ghar	Mithilesh Chaturvedi		
2019	Jhootha Kahin Ka	Varun Singh		
2023	Lavaste	Satyansh		
2024	Button	Vishal Singh	Short film	
2025	Ufff Yeh Siyapaa	Hasmukh		
TBA	Project Love †	TBA	Filming	

=== Television ===
Year	Title	Role	Notes
2014	Siyaasat	Mahabat Khan	2 episodes
2024	Aangan - Aapno Kaa	Siddhanth	

=== Web series ===
Year	Title	Role	Notes
2019	Bhram	Aarav Khanna	
2020	Forbidden Love	Neel	Episode 1

=== Music videos ===
Year	Title
2020	"Makhmali"
2021	"Tauba Tauba"
2021	"Sau Sau Wari Khat Likhe"
2021	"Rona Nahi"
2021	"Meri Mohabbat"
2024	"Barsaat"
2025	"Mar Baitha"
2026	"Saggie Ae Sharaab"

== Awards and nominations ==
Awards and Nominations
Total
Wins	2
Nominations	4

Year	Award	Category	Work	Result
2015	BIG Star Entertainment Awards	Most Entertaining Film Debut-Male	Pyaar Ka Punchnama 2	Won
2015	BIG Star Entertainment Awards	Most Entertaining Ensemble Cast	Pyaar Ka Punchnama 2	Won
2016	Apsara Awards	Best Debut Actor	Pyaar Ka Punchnama 2	Nominated
2016	Stardust Awards	Best Debut Actor	Pyaar Ka Punchnama 2	Nominated
2016	Screen Awards	Most Promising Actor Debut	Pyaar Ka Punchnama 2	Nominated
2016	Screen Awards	Best Ensemble Cast	Pyaar Ka Punchnama 2	Nominated
