= Pawan Gill =

Canadian film producer

- Born: Vancouver, British Columbia, Canada
- Occupations: Film producer, filmmaker
- Years active: 2005–present
- Organisation: Brat Films
- Known for: Shadaa, Puaada, Super Singh
- Website: www.instagram.com/thepawangill

Pawan Gill is a film producer and filmmaker born and raised in Vancouver, British Columbia now based in Mumbai, India. He has his ancestral roots hailing from Ludhiana, Punjab. He is known for producing films like Shadaa, Puaada, Super Singh and Honsla Rakh.

== Career ==
He moved to India in 2005 to pursue a career as a filmmaker after studying filmmaking at Vancouver Film School, he started work as an assistant director with Yashraj Films where he worked for five years on such films like Neal 'n' Nikki and Dhoom 2. Thereafter he branched out on his own as a director with the film Jo Hum Chahein and then went on to produce Mundeyan Ton Bachke Rahin. He and filmmaker Anurag Singh set up their company Brat Films where he has produced Super Singh, Shadaa and Puaada. He co-produced the blockbuster Honsla Rakh with actor Diljit Dosanjh, this is his third film as a producer with the Punjabi actor, their film Shadaa set new box office records in Punjabi cinema. His company's first Hindi language feature film Jersey starring Bollywood superstar Shahid Kapoor produced by his brother Aman Gill released on April 22, 2022.

== Personal life ==
He has a twin brother Aman Gill, who also works in the film industry, he started his career as an executive producer on the film Black. He has produced several Bollywood films including Jersey and Udta Punjab starring Shahid Kapoor amongst many others.

== Filmography ==
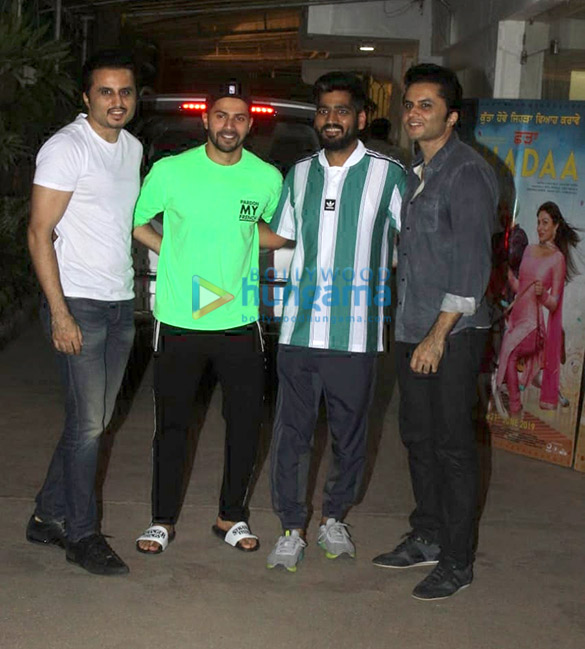
Pawan Gill (on the far right) with Varun Dhawan, Jagdeep Sidhu and twin brother Aman Gill during a special screening of Shadaa

Year	Film	Director	Story	Writer	Producer
2011	Jo Hum Chahein	Yes	Yes	Yes	
2014	Mundeyan Ton Bachke Rahin		Yes		Yes
2017	Super Singh				Yes
2019	Shadaa				Yes
2021	Puaada				Yes
2021	Honsla Rakh				Yes
