= Kingdom (2025 film) =

2025 Indian film by Gowtam Tinnanuri

- Theatrical release poster
- Directed by: Gowtam Tinnanuri
- Written by: Gowtam Tinnanuri
- Produced by: Naga Vamsi; Sai Soujanya; Aravind Aendapally
- Starring: Vijay Deverakonda; Satyadev; Bhagyashri Borse
- Cinematography: Girish Gangadharan; Jomon T. John
- Edited by: Naveen Nooli
- Music by: Anirudh Ravichander
- Production company: Sithara Entertainments; Fortune Four Creations; Srikara Studios
- Release date: 31 July 2025
- Running time: 160 minutes
- Country: India
- Language: Telugu
- Budget: ₹130 crore
- Box office: ₹82.02 crore

Kingdom is a 2025 Indian Telugu-language spy action thriller film written and directed by Gowtam Tinnanuri. Produced by Naga Vamsi and Sai Soujanya under the banners of Sithara Entertainments and Fortune Four Cinemas, the film stars Vijay Deverakonda alongside Satyadev and Bhagyashri Borse. The plot follows a troubled police officer who is assigned to go undercover on a case that brings him face-to-face with his past demons.

The film was officially announced in January 2023 under the tentative title VD12, and the official title was announced in February 2025. Principal photography commenced in June 2023. Filming took place in Hyderabad, Visakhapatnam, Kerala and Sri Lanka. The film has music composed by Anirudh Ravichander, cinematography handled by Girish Gangadharan with Jomon T. John and editing by Naveen Nooli.

Kingdom was released worldwide on 31 July 2025 to mixed reviews from critics and audiences. The film grossed ₹82.02 crore worldwide and underperformed at the box office. It was intended to be the first installment of a planned duology, however, the sequel was shelved.

== Plot ==
In 1920, Srikakulam, a group of tribals along with their king, try to stop the massacre of their people by the British, for mining gold. However, they are unsuccessful in doing so and their king dies without telling the survivors of the massacre about a prophesied descendant of their tribe. In 1991, Constable Byreddy Surya "Suri", a young and aggressive, but well-mannered police officer who, after being separated from his elder brother, Siva, during their childhood for killing their abusive father, is recruited by a RAW handler, Jayaprakash 'JP', to go on an undercover mission.

His objective is to infiltrate the heavily fortified island off of Sri Lanka, known as "Divi", in the midst of the Sri Lankan civil war and obtain details about a huge consignment of arms and gold coming from Hong Kong, just a few months after the assassination of Rajiv Gandhi. However, Divi is ruled with an iron fist by Odiyappan, who is part of the Sri Lankan cartel and comes from a Tamil-speaking family. Suri is shocked to know that his long-lost brother, Siva, is the leader of the descendants of the tribe from 1920 who have relocated to Divi to escape from the British. He begins his mission by instigating a brawl during a temple festival and getting himself arrested and sent to Jaffna prison, a place notorious for its brutal and lawless conditions. Upon his arrival, the two brothers, now on opposite sides of a brewing conflict, are reunited under tense and dangerous circumstances.

Suri's mission becomes more complex as he struggles to balance his loyalty to his country and newfound connection with his brother. He gains favor within the prison's hierarchy and the trust of Siva. Siva and his gang manage to get bail and also post Suri's bail; they take him to Divi where Suri slowly begins to understand the real stakes of his mission after witnessing what the residents of Divi go through with Odiyappan and his younger son, Murugan. He frequently reports to Dr. Madhu, an Indian doctor who is also a spy, about his mission. In a critical moment as part of Siva's gang during a smuggling operation, Suri is forced to leave behind a consignment of gold during a chase in the mangroves of Jaffna by the Sri Lankan navy. In a cartel meeting with Siva and his gang, Murugan grows suspicious of Siva and his people due to the navy's appearance during their smuggling operation. Realizing the danger of the fallout and his concern for the residents of Divi, Suri promises to bring back the gold consignment from a naval base. His success in this mission makes him a celebrated figure amongst the Divi's residents and strengthens his equation with them. However, Siva comes to know of his true identity of an Indian police officer in the process.

Murugan's paranoia intensifies after he murders his own father, Odiyappan, and realizes there is a mole within the ranks of the cartel. He invites the people of Divi along with Siva and his family, to witness the last rites of his father and feast at his house. However, one of Siva's deputies, Singha, remains wary of Suri and promises to look into his background, leaving Divi in the process. Meanwhile, it is shown that Jayaprakash has planted many spies in Divi and the Sri Lankan cartel, with Murugan's deputy, Selva, being one of them. Murugan begins to believe that Suri is the traitor after Selva hands over circumstantial evidence to a senior cartel member present there, Saravanan, proving that one of the Byreddy brothers is a spy. After a confrontation with the cartel members, Siva falsely admits himself as a spy and is mercilessly killed by Murugan along with many of his people, including his wife.

On the other hand, Suri drinks alcohol for the first time in his life and admits to Madhu that it was he who killed his and Siva's father, and that Siva took on the blame for it. He realizes that the life he has been living belongs to Siva, and he should be in Siva's shoes instead. He learns of his brother's fate and Murugan's massacre from Madhu the following morning. Driven by an amalgamation of fury and grief, he unleashes his full potential to avenge Siva and the residents' deaths and liberate the remaining people of Divi. A fierce battle ensues where Suri confronts and kills Murugan, fulfilling the prophecy that he is the reincarnation of the past king. He then assumes leadership of Divi, as king for the people in need of a savior. In a twist, Sethu, Odiyappan's elder son and Murugan's elder brother, arrives in Divi to avenge his kin, while Singha finally reaches Suri and Suguna's house in Ankapur and finds a photo of Suri in his police uniform, hinting at a sequel.

== Cast ==
- Vijay Deverakonda in dual role
  - Constable Byreddy Surya "Suri", Srikakulam tribal king's reincarnation
    - Ronit Kamra as young Suri
  - Srikakulam tribal king
- Satyadev as Byreddy Siva, Suri's elder brother
  - Kothala Bhanu Prakash as young Siva
- Bhagyashri Borse as Dr. Madhu
- Manish Chaudhari as Jayapraksh alias JP, Suri's spy handler in Sri Lanka
- Ayyappa P. Sharma as Bhairaghi
- Rohini as Byreddy Suguna, Siva’s and Suri’s mother
- Venkitesh V. P. as Murugan
- Baburaj as Odiyappan, Murugan’s father
- Ajith Koshy as Saravanan, a Sri Lankan cartel member
- Bhoomi Shetty as Gauri, Siva’s wife and Suri’s sister-in-law
- Ravi Krishna as Selva, Murugan's deputy
- Navya Swamy as Meenakshi
- Rajkumar Kasireddy as Singha, a deputy of Siva
- Kancharapalem Kishore as Nanaji
- Mahesh Achanta as Nagi
- Goparaju Ramana as Constable Yadagiri, Siva and Suri's uncle; Suguna's elder brother
- Muralidhar Goud as SI Ramulu
- Kiran Varanasi as Byreddy
- B. S. Avinash as Bagatha Bhairagi
- Abhay Bethiganti as Sreenu
- Keshav Deepak as K. Narasimha Rao

== Production ==
=== Development ===
After starting filming for Acharya in early 2021, it was reported that Gowtam Tinnanuri had met Ram Charan and narrated a script which impressed the actor. The production was reportedly set to begin after Charan completes his commitments for Acharya and RRR (2022). The project was officially announced on 15 October 2021, tentatively titled RC15. It would be funded by UV Creations, in association with NVR Cinema. The following August, however, it was reported that the project was shelved due to reasons unknown. That November, it was officially confirmed to have been shelved with no reasons being stated. Gowtam then reportedly visited Vijay Deverakonda and narrated the same script which also impressed the actor.

The film would be funded by Suryadevara Naga Vamsi and Sai Soujanya, under Sithara Entertainments, Fortune Four Creations, and Srikara Studios. The company made a public announcement on 13 January 2023, confirming the project. In January 2025, Naga Vamsi announced that the film would be released in two parts. The film's official title as Kingdom was announced on 12 February 2025.

=== Filming ===
In June 2023, principal photography commenced in Hyderabad. However, filming was delayed due to Vijay's ongoing commitments, Kushi and The Family Star. Filming resumed in April 2024 in Visakhapatnam with a month-long schedule. The third schedule commenced in July 2024 in Sri Lanka with 60% of the filming completed. Filming then began in areas of Kothamangalam, Thandikudi and Nagercoil. In September 2024, the fourth schedule commenced in Kerala. In November 2024, Devarakonda suffered a minor shoulder injury on sets. As of January 2025, 80% of the filming was completed.

== Music ==
Kingdom

Soundtrack album by Anirudh Ravichander
- Released: 3 July 2025
- Recorded: 2024–2025
- Studios: Albuquerque Studios, Chennai
- Genre: Feature film soundtrack
- Language: Telugu
- Label: Aditya Music
- Producer: Anirudh Ravichander

Anirudh Ravichander chronology
Vidaamuyarchi (2025)	Kingdom (2025)	Coolie (2025)

The soundtrack is composed by Anirudh Ravichander, in his second collaboration with Gowtam Tinnanuri after Jersey (2019) and first collaboration with Devarakonda. The audio rights were acquired by Aditya Music.

The title teaser theme "Kingdom Teaser OST" was released on 17 March 2025. The first single, titled "Hridayam Lopala", was released on 2 May 2025. The second single, titled "Anna Antene", was released on 16 July 2025.

All lyrics are written by Krishna Kanth.

Track listing
No.	Title	Singer(s)	Length
1.	"Kingdom Teaser OST" (Lyrics: Choir)	Anirudh Ravichander	1:19
2.	"Hridayam Lopala"	Anirudh Ravichander, Anumita Nadesan	3:40
3.	"Anna Antene"	Anirudh Ravichander	4:15
4.	"Ragile Ragile"	Siddharth Basrur	5:04

== Release ==
=== Theatrical ===
Kingdom was released worldwide on 31 July 2025 in Telugu along with dubbed versions in Tamil and Hindi. The film was originally scheduled to be released worldwide on 28 March 2025, but was later postponed due to unfinished production work. The film was again rescheduled to release on 30 May 2025, but was postponed again. A new release date was announced as 4 July 2025, but was delayed again due to an undisclosed reason.

=== Marketing ===
On 12 February 2025, the makers unveiled the film's teaser on social media platforms. The teaser features voice overs by N. T. Rama Rao Jr. in Telugu along with voice overs by Suriya and Ranbir Kapoor in Tamil and Hindi respectively. The film's trailer was released on 26 July 2025.

=== Home media ===
The digital distribution rights of the film were acquired by Netflix. The film began streaming on the platform from 27 August 2025 in Telugu and dubbed versions of Hindi, Tamil, Kannada and Malayalam languages. This version, however, was edited and particularly removed a carnival fight sequence to maintain pace and flow in the storyline for the viewers.

== Reception ==
Kingdom received generally mixed reviews from critics.

Avad Mohammad of OTTPlay rated the film 2.5/5 stars and wrote "Kingdom does not live up to all the hype created. Kingdom has scale and style, but it misses out on the much-needed emotions in the narrative." BH Harsh of Cinema Express rated 2.5/5 stars and wrote "Kingdom is an ambitious failure, somewhat admirable but largely underwhelming." Swaroop Kodur of The Indian Express rated with 2.5/5 stars and wrote "Kingdom never truly tethers us emotionally to its story. Though the film juggles many elements, it never settles on a central thread to bring them into harmony."

BVS Prakash of Deccan Chronicle rated with 1.5/5 stars and wrote "Director Gautam Tinnanuri, best known for the emotionally rich Jersey, struggles to replicate that magic in this overly ambitious tale. His attempt to spotlight the plight of Andhra fishermen is noble in intent but lacks emotional weight and authenticity. The foreign setting further alienates the audience, and the script never finds its footing." Satya Pulagam of ABP Live gave 1.5/5 stars and wrote "'Kingdom' is not built on new ideas or scenes. From start to finish, it evokes memories of earlier films, 'Chhatrapati', 'Aayirathil Oruvan', and eventually, 'KGF'.

Balakrishna Ganeshan of The News Minute wrote "While Gowtham Tinnanuri’s ‘Kingdom’ is highly ambitious, it forgets what makes storytelling compelling: clarity, character, and connection." Sruthi Ganapathy Raman of The Hollywood Reporter India wrote "With the story of another brother looming in the shadows, the hope is for the film to find its redemption soon."

== Controversies ==
Kingdom faced criticism from the Tamil-speaking community for its depiction of Sri Lankan Tamils. The portrayal was widely condemned as insensitive, with critics highlighting the ongoing impact of the Tamil genocide in Sri Lanka. The film was accused of misrepresenting a historically persecuted group, leading to online backlash, including calls for both a boycott and a ban of the film in Tamil Nadu.

== Future ==
Following the theatrical release of Kingdom on 31 July 2025, Gowtam Tinnanuri said that the film was envisioned as part of a larger Kingdom universe. Instead of moving immediately to a sequel, the makers announced that a standalone OTT prequel focusing on the character Sethu was in development. The prequel is intended to expand the narrative and serve as a bridge to the sequel. Tinnanuri also stated that Kingdom: Part 2 remains in the pipeline and will follow after the prequel. In addition, discussions also took place about a potential third film, set in the 1920s, though this project was not finalised. However, following the lukewarm response from the audience, the sequel was shelved.
