= U, Me Aur Ghar =

- Directed by: Abhay Chhabra
- Written by: Chiranjeevi Bajpai
- Produced by: Virendra Shahaney, Aparna Shahaney, Crimson Cube
- Starring: Omkar Kapoor; Simran Kaur Mundi
- Cinematography: Nisha Jha, Sanjeev Dubey
- Edited by: Jaskaran Singh, Imran Chauhan
- Music by: Nishant Pandey
- Release date: 10 February 2017
- Running time: 90 minutes
- Country: India
- Language: Hindi

U, Me Aur Ghar is a 2017 Indian web film. It was launched by Web Talkies -- a digital home entertainment brand. The film was directed by Umesh Ghadge and Abhay Chhabra, and written by Chiranjeevi Bajpai. It stars Omkar Kapoor, Simran Kaur Mundi, and Sanyukta Timsina.

== Plot ==
The film revolves around a live-in couple, Chitti and Mittu, who begin their journey by looking to buy a house in Mumbai. Along the way, they realize that a house hunt is more than just timely EMIs and romantic ideals. The film is available for viewing on YouTube, Hungama, and Web Talkies. The web movie, which will release on 10 February, features actors Omkar Kapoor of Pyaar Ka Punchnama 2 fame, who is seen playing the role of Mittu aka Mithilesh, and Simran Kaur Mundi from the film Kis Kisko Pyaar Karoon, with her character known as Chitti aka Chitranshi Mazumdar.

The 90-minutes web movie revisits the theme of a couple searching for their abode in a bustling city.

The web-based movie is the first step towards bringing a massive change in entertainment consumption patterns of the entire country. It shows how modern-day dynamics that affect a couple's relationship and how the house represents a physical manifestation of their love for each other.

== Cast ==
- Omkar Kapoor as Mittu aka Mithilesh Chaturvedi
- Simran Kaur Mundi as Chitti aka Chitranshi Mazumdar
- Sanyukta Timsina as Akansha
