= Puaada =

2021 Panjabi romantic comedy film

- Official theatrical release poster
- Directed by: Rupinder Chahal
- Written by: Balwinder Singh Janjua; Rupinder Chahal; Anil Rodhan
- Produced by: Atul Bhalla; Pawan Gill; Anurag Singh; Aman Gill; Balwinder Singh Janjua
- Starring: Ammy Virk; Sonam Bajwa
- Cinematography: Anshul Chobey
- Edited by: Manish More
- Music by: Sandeep Saxena
- Production companies: A&A Pictures; Brat Films
- Distributed by: Zee Studios
- Release date: 12 August 2021
- Running time: 130 minutes
- Country: India
- Language: Punjabi
- Box office: est. ₹18 crore (US$1.9 million)

Puaada (transl. Problem) is a 2021 Indian Punjabi-language romantic comedy produced by A&A Pictures and Brat Films, directed by debutant director Rupinder Chahal, starring Ammy Virk and Sonam Bajwa in lead roles. The film follows the love story of a Punjabi village boy, running a dairy farm who is in a relationship with Raunak, an air force officer's daughter and the comedy of errors and confusion that happens the day their match is to be arranged. It was scheduled to be released on 2 April 2021, but due to the second wave of the COVID-19 pandemic, the release date was postponed. The film finally released theatrically on 12 August 2021 to coincide with Independence day week in India.

On box office, the film has become the first North Indian language hit since the COVID-19 pandemic started in March 2020, the film has grossed ₹18.00 crore (US$1.9 million) worldwide. and premiered online on 17 September 2021

== Plot ==
Puaada (Conflict/Quarrel) revolves around a lovable and exuberant man from Punjab, Jaggi Ammy Virk and the mesmerizing girl next door, Raunak Sonam Bajwa. Jaggi is a farmer and supplies dairy to every family in his hometown. One such family is Raunak's whose father is an Air Force Officer. Jaggi and Raunak are in a relationship and decide to confess their love to their parents but Raunak's father disapproves of their relationship as he wanted a groom to be educated and be in the armed forces like him, and Jaggi's mom disapproves as she wants a simple village girl for her son. The families eventually agree to meet but the twist in the tale comes when Jaggi pulls away unexpectedly. This results in a Puaada (conflict/quarrel) between Jaggi and Raunak and their families, leading to hilarious situations. Puaada is a complete family romance comedy of errors, an entertainer where Jaggi and Raunak must rise above all to save their relationship and get everyone, including themselves out of this Puaada.

== Cast ==
- Ammy Virk as Jaggi
- Sonam Bajwa as Raunak, Jaggi's love interest
- Anita Devgan as Jeetan, Jaggi's mother
- Hardeep Gill as Dhillon, Raunak's father, an air force officer
- Seema Kaushal as Raunak's mother
- Sukhwinder Singh Chahal as Gajjan Singh, Jaggi's father
- Nisha Bano as Dippi, Jaggi's sister
- Gurpreet Bhangu as Banto, speaker chachi
- Prakash Gadhu as sarpanch
- Sukhwinder Raj as Jaggi's brother-in-law
- Mintu Kappa as Bhaana, Jaggi's friend
- Honey Mattu as Lakha, Jaggi's friend

== Production ==
The film was announced in March 2019 with Ammy Virk And Sonam Bajwa. In December 2019, it was reported that Ammy Virk and Sonam Bajwa are paired in a romantic comedy, making it their fourth film together after Nikka Zaildar, Nikka Zaildar 2 and Muklawa. The filming was in progress, and it was slated to release on 12 June 2020, when due to COVID-19 pandemic the shooting was postponed.

On 18 January 2021, the producers of the film announced release date in March 2021, claiming it as the first Punjabi film to be released post COVID-19 pandemic. The release date was later changed to 2 April 2021 to coincide with Good Friday holidays. The film finally released theatrically on 12 August 2021 to coincide with Independence day week in India.

== Reception ==
=== Critical response ===
The film was unanimously loved and praised by all critics for being a complete family entertainer. Troy Ribeiro of IANS rated the film with 3.5 stars out of 5 and praised the performance of Ammy Virk, Sonam Bajwa and supporting cast. He wrote that narrative of the film is simple with full of wit and humour. He praised Rakesh Dhawan for dialogues and screenplay. He liked the music of the film specially mentioning the song "Aaye hai jattiye kamaal". Ribeiro liked humorous climax and concluded, "Overall, Puaada is a complete entertainer that transports you to Punjab and Jaggi's life for the entire duration and keeps you involved."

Jaspreet Nijher of the Times of India rated the film 3.5 stars out of 5 and stating that "The foremost accomplishment of ‘Puaada’ lies in the fact that it is like a jab of happiness for two hours for film buffs encumbered by being shuttered indoors for over a year." She highlighted that the film has a " a riotously hilarious second half," and appreciated that "the film has two heroes, with the other being Sonam Bajwa.. without being the male hero, Sonam leads with utter femininity even as she is beating and chasing the villains, and when squabbling in lover’s quarrel in brazen language. Kudos to films like ‘Puaada’ that are chipping at the prop tag from female leads in Punjabi films."

Bobby Singh from the Free Press Journal gave the film 3 out of 5 stars stating that "The situational comedy largely works because of its well-written dialogues and lead performances by Ammy Virk and Sonam Bajwa." He adds that "the chemistry between Ammy Virk and Sonam Bajwa is the soul of this Punjabi film," and he also mentions that along with Ammy Virk this can be called a Sonam Bajwa Film "The talented and gorgeous girl remains the soul of its entire narration, superbly complemented by Ammy playing the role of a simpleton village milk vendor. The couple together brightens up the screen!" He concluded his review mentioning that Puaada is a "fairly entertaining film for the audience along with becoming a profit-making venture for its makers!"

Sukhpreet Kahlon of Cinestaan gave the film 3 out of 5 stars declaring the film "a laugh riot from the word go as the characters find themselves thrown into one messy situation into another" she particularly highlighted "the dialogues by Rakesh Dhawan stand out as much of the humour comes from the clever writing and leaves the audience in splits. Virk and Bajwa share great chemistry and their performances are complemented by the supporting cast." She concluded that this film is "the ideal family entertainer to drive away lockdown blues!"

Kiddaan.com gave the film 4 stars out of 5, stating that the movie will take you on a laughter ride to remember stating that "from beginning to the end, it makes you experience ups and downs of emotions and excitement, and the only thing that remains constant is the doses of laughter!" They further go on to state that "Puaada makes sure that you’re entertained throughout..it is an amazing movie, especially when you’re looking forward to watching something to relax your stressed-out schedule and the usual daily routine. If we would have to describe Puaada is a single phrase it would be Paisa Wasool."

Bollywood film trade critic Komal Nahta declared the film "what a laugh riot!" he further added this is "also the public reaction as it opened in North India. Crowds returning to cinemas and enjoying the film, laughing their guts out. Several cinemas planning to reopen from tomorrow after seeing response!"

Martin Tsai from a critics notebook, a review that is carried on rottentomatoes and several USA media publications gave a glowing review to the film "An intoxicating mix of rom-com and thriller, Puaada gets more hilarious the more dire the situation its characters face." He stated "Despite its cultural specificity, Puaada consistently defies expectations. It centers on genre conventions and Indian customs, yet it’s eager to spin those on their heads." He highlighted that "Puaada tries to be everything to everyone and somehow succeeds. It’s thrilling. It’s romantic. It’s incredibly funny. It suspends your disbelief so disarmingly only to raise the stakes and escalate its outrageousness!"

=== Box office ===
Puaada had the opening day collection of ₹1.25 crore and opening weekend worldwide gross of ₹7.15 crore. The film as of 17 September 2021, has grossed ₹18.00 crore worldwide.

== Home Video ==
The film was released on ZEE5 on 17 September 2021 for home viewing audience.

== Music ==
Puaada

Soundtrack album by V Rakx Music
- Released: 16 March 2021
- Recorded: 2020–21
- Genre: Feature film soundtrack
- Length: 12:35
- Language: Punjabi
- Label: Zee Music Company
External audio
- Puaada - Full Album
- Puaada - Full Album on YouTube
- Puaada - Full Album on Gaana

The full album of the film was released on YouTube and Gaana on 16 March 2021 by Zee Music.

Track listing from jukebox
No.	Title	Lyrics	Music	Singer(s)	Length
1.	"Aaye Haye Jattiye"	Happy Raikoti	Happy Raikoti and V Rakx Music (Rakesh Varma)	Ammy Virk	2:47
2.	"Paunda Boliyaan"	Harmanjeet Singh	Harmanjeet Singh and V Rakx Music (Rakesh Varma)	Ammy Virk and Tarannum Malik	2:43
3.	"Pab Chakya Geya"	Happy Raikoti	Happy Raikoti & V Rakx Music (Rakesh Varma)	Ammy Virk and Jasmeen Akhtar	3:18
4.	"Pe Geya Puaada"	Happy Raikoti	Happy Raikoti and V Rakx Music (Rakesh Varma)	Nachhatar Gill	3:47
Total length:					12:35
