= Dil Kabaddi =

2008 film by Anil Sharma

- Film poster
- Directed by: Anil Sharma
- Written by: Vivek Anand; Anil Senior; Lezlie Sparx
- Produced by: Shailesh R Singh
- Starring: Irrfan Khan; Rahul Bose; Rahul Khanna; Konkona Sen Sharma; Soha Ali Khan; Payal Rohatgi
- Cinematography: Anay Goswamy
- Edited by: Heman Kothari
- Music by: Sachin Gupta; Dhruv Dhalla; Sagar Desai
- Production company: Viacom 18 Motion Pictures
- Distributed by: Viacom18 Motion Pictures
- Release date: 5 December 2008
- Country: India
- Language: Hindi

Dil Kabaddi is a 2008 Indian Hindi-language sports comedy film directed by Anil Sharma. The film stars Irrfan Khan, Rahul Bose, Konkona Sen Sharma, Soha Ali Khan, Payal Rohatgi, Rahul Khanna, and a special appearance by Rahat Fateh Ali Khan.

== Plot ==
Set in contemporary Mumbai, the movie takes a close look at the evolving equations among urban couples and paints the metamorphosis of the relationships with a comic stroke.

The film tracks the lives of two modern-day married couples – Samit Talpade and Mita Wadia; Rishi Sharma and Simi Ghatge – caught in a web of boredom, loss of love, and temptation.

The film starts with an announcement by Samit Talpade and Mita Wadia of their separation and follows the moral muddles and emotional crises of the couples over the next year and a half – as friends fight, separate, take lovers, and, in a way, reconcile.

== Cast ==
- Irrfan Khan as Samit Talpade
- Rahul Bose as Rishi Sharma
- Rahul Khanna as Rajveer Singh
- Konkona Sen Sharma as Simi Ghatge
- Soha Ali Khan as Mita Wadia
- Payal Rohatgi as Kaya Rao
- Saba Azad as Raga Malik
- Rahat Fateh Ali Khan as special appearance in the song "Zindagi Ye"

== Soundtrack ==
The music for all the songs were composed by Sachin Gupta and Dhruv Dhalla with lyrics written by Virag Mishra.

#	Title	Singer(s)	Duration
1	"Ehsaan"	Sachin Gupta, Jaspreet Jasz	04:35
2	"Uthale Ya Phenk De"	Jaspreet Jasz, Aditya Jassi, Sachin Gupta	03:36
3	"Zindagi"	Rahat Fateh Ali Khan, Sachin Gupta	04:58
4	"Ok Tata Done"	Mika Singh	03:02
5	"Nasha Nashila"	Jaspreet Jasz, Sachin Gupta, Paroma Banerji	03:40
6	"Ehsaan – Remix"	Sachin Gupta, Jaspreet Jasz	03:01
7	"Zindagi Ye – (Rock Version)"	Rahat Fateh Ali Khan, Sachin Gupta	05:26
8	"Good Night"	Poroma Banerji, Monali Thakur, Jaspreet Singh	02:35

== Reception ==
Sukanya Verma of Rediff.com gave the film 2.5 out of 5, writing, ″For most part, intermission to be specific, Dil Kabaddi keeps you involved with its amusing interactions and relatable characters. Strongly urban and individualistic, they haunt the hotspots (Vie Lounge, Sampan) and landmarks of Mumbai (yes Taj too), where the film is based, with distinct belonging and understated pride.″ Rajeev Masand of CNN-IBN gave the film 2.5 out of 5, writing, ″Dil Kabaddi might have been an instant entertainer had director Anil Senior exercised a tighter grip on the screenplay, but because much of the film's second act seems to go around in circles, the film is enjoyable but only in parts. I'm going with two out of five for director Anil Senior's Dil Kabaddi; it's a film with some wonderfully light moments that will leave you smiling from ear to ear. And for that, we have Woody Allen to thank.″

Gaurav Malani of The Economic Times gave the film 2 out of 5, writing, ″Dil Kabaddi takes a sporty look at the game of hearts. Watch it for some 'hearty' laughs. Kaveree Bamzai of India Today called it a ″rip off of Woody Allen's Husbands and Wives″, she further wrote, ″The movie is kept alive by the smartness of its actors, who lend the occasionally dull screenplay a lot of spark.″ Taran Adarsh of Bollywood Hungama gave the film 1.5 out of 5, writing, ″On the whole, DIL KABADDI has shock-value, but not a strong plot to leave an impact.″
