= Shadaa =

2019 Indian film by Jagdeep Sidhu

- Theatrical release poster
- Directed by: Jagdeep Sidhu
- Screenplay by: Jagdeep Sidhu
- Produced by: Atul Bhalla; Amit Bhalla; Pawan Gill; Anurag Singh; Aman Gill
- Starring: Diljit Dosanjh; Neeru Bajwa; Jagjeet Sandhu
- Narrated by: Yogesh Grover
- Cinematography: Vineet Malhotra
- Edited by: Manish More
- Music by: Sandeep Saxena
- Production companies: A & A Adivisors; Brat Films
- Distributed by: Omjee Group and Narishma Enterprises (India); White Hill Studios (Overseas)
- Release date: 21 June 2019
- Running time: 128 minutes
- Country: India
- Language: Punjabi
- Box office: est. ₹52.75 crore

Shadaa (transl. Bachelor) is a 2019 Indian Punjabi-language romantic comedy film written and directed by Jagdeep Sidhu, and co-produced by A & A Advisors and Brat Films. The film starring Diljit Dosanjh and Neeru Bajwa, follows the story of an average man looking for a bride and what happens when he finally marries a girl who thinks marriage is beautiful. Shadaa also features Hardeep Gill, Anita Devgn, and Jagjeet Sandhu in supporting roles.

Principal photography of the film began on 30 September 2018 and completed on 8 May 2019. The music rights of the film are with Zee Music Company. Soundtrack of the film was composed by Nick Dhammu, JSL Singh, and V Rakx Music, which features vocals from Dosanjh, Raj Ranjodh, and Shipra Goyal.

The film was theatrical released worldwide on 21 June 2019. The film was opened to positive response by critics. Shaada grossed ₹31 million (US$320,000) on its opening day and ₹108.9 million (US$1.1 million) in its opening weekend domestically, making the all-time opening records in Punjabi cinema. As of 4 August 2019, the film has grossed ₹527.5 million (US$5.5 million) globally, making it sixth highest-grossing Punjabi film of all time.

== Plot ==
Amidst pressures from his parents to hurry up and wed, a young man Chadta seeks his perfect match. After many failed attempts with matchmakers, his parents are delighted when their son finally meets the woman, Vanjhali of his dreams but things do not go as planned. Chadta and Vanjhali come close in a wedding. Vanjhali is a wedding planner and Chadta a photographer. Chadta wishes to marry her but Vanjhali is against marriage and suggests Chadta to live in. They come close during a wedding in Rajasthan where they were working together. Vanjhali is able to convince Chadta that marriages are a failed institution. Soon after that she is betrothed to Bagh Singh. Bagh is a lover failed in his previous relationship. He is not really into the wedding but agrees to wed Vanjhali because she is rich and after wedding he would be a house husband and live in her large house. Chadta is assigned for the pre wedding photoshoot. He thanks Bagh for accepting Vanjhali even after knowing about her live in with Chadta. This sly remark gets her wedding cancelled. Vanjhali's mother is convinced Vanjhali must be married to Chadta to save the family name. Chadta although loves Vanjhali pretends he doesn't want to get married. On their wedding day Vanjhali goes missing as she doesn't want to forcefully wed Chadta. Chadta finds Vanjhali on her way to Shimla eating in a dhaba and confess about his love and how he broke off her wedding with Bagh Singh. Finally they get married.

== Cast ==
- Diljit Dosanjh as Chadta
- Neeru Bajwa as Vanjhali
- Jagjeet Sandhu as Bhag
- Hardeep Gill
- Anita Devgan
- Gurpreet Bhangu
- Sonam Bajwa as (Special Appearance in the song "Tommy")
- Parminder Gill as Hostel warden

== Soundtrack ==
Shadaa

Soundtrack album by Nick Dhammu, JSL Singh and V Rakx Music
- Released: 25 May 2019
- Recorded: 2019
- Genre: Feature film soundtrack
- Length: 16:25
- Label: Zee Music Company
External audio
- Audio Jukebox on YouTube

The soundtrack of Shadaa is composed by Nick Dhammu, JSL Singh and V Rakx Music, lyrics by Happy Raikoti, Raj Ranjodh and Rav Hanjra. Ramit Bajaj of Film Companion described the songs as "pretty mediocre".

Track listing
No.	Title	Lyrics	Music	Singer(s)	Length
1.	"Shadaa (Title Song)"	Happy Raikoti	Nick Dhammu	Diljit Dosanjh	2:46
2.	"Mehndi"	Happy Raikoti	Nick Dhammu	Diljit Dosanjh & Shipra Goyal	2:46
3.	"Tommy"	Raj Ranjodh	JSL Singh	Raj Ranjodh	2:50
4.	"Expensive"	Happy Raikoti	Nick Dhammu	Diljit Dosanjh	2:21
5.	"Mehfil"	Rav Hanjra	V Rakx Music	Diljit Dosanjh	3:04
6.	"Mor"	Happy Raikoti	Nick Dhammu	Diljit Dosanjh	2:42
Total length:					16:25

== Production ==
I was clear from the beginning that the film shouldn't look like Jatt & Juliet at all, though everyone wanted the same chemistry to appear onscreen.

— Jagdeep Sidhu, director

Diljit Dosanjh in an interview said, "I was thinking about the topics that have not been touched upon in Punjab. So I realised that a film on shadaa had not been made. It has been touched upon but an entire film hasn’t been attempted before. I discussed the idea with my writer and director, Jagdeep Sidhu and producers Pawan Gill and Anurag Singh who developed the story." Since all the pre-production was set, then team started looking for a leading lady and Neeru Bajwa being their first choice joined the film. In an interview he described Shadaa as "a man who’s having trouble finding a wife" which is different from Bachelor while Dosanjh said, "There is no equivalent in Hindi or English for the term. A bachelor is something different as a shadaa is someone who is above 30 and not married, even though he wants to. People often taunt them but they do not reply because they are our own people."

Shadaa was announced in last week of August 2018 by Diljit Dosanjh. The principal photography of the film began on 30 September 2018 and completed on 8 May 2019, where Vineet Malhotra served as a cinematographer. Bajwa described it as "hilarious" and "amazing" experience. The film was edited by Manish More and its final cut ran for a total of 127 minutes and 45 seconds.

== Marketing and release ==
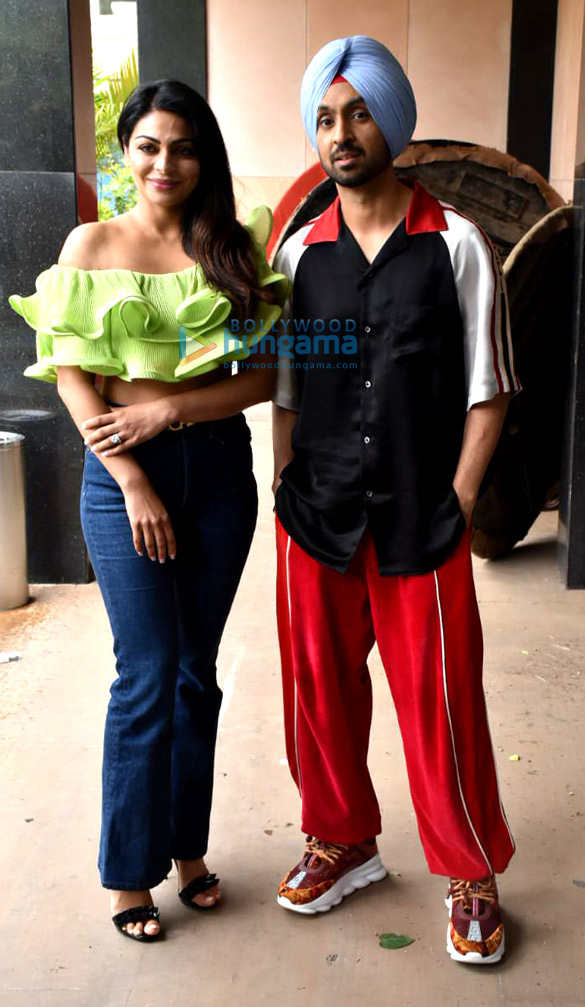
Diljit Dosanjh and Neeru Bajwa promoting Shadaa in 2019

The first look poster of the film was revealed on 18 May 2019, which carried a reference of Kylie Jenner. The trailer of the film was released on 21 May on YouTube, which has been viewed 10 million times since its release. three days later on 24 May a quirky theatrical release poster was unveiled. The title track of the film, sung by Diljit Dosanjh, lyrics by Happy Raikoti and music by Nick Dhamu was released on 25 May.

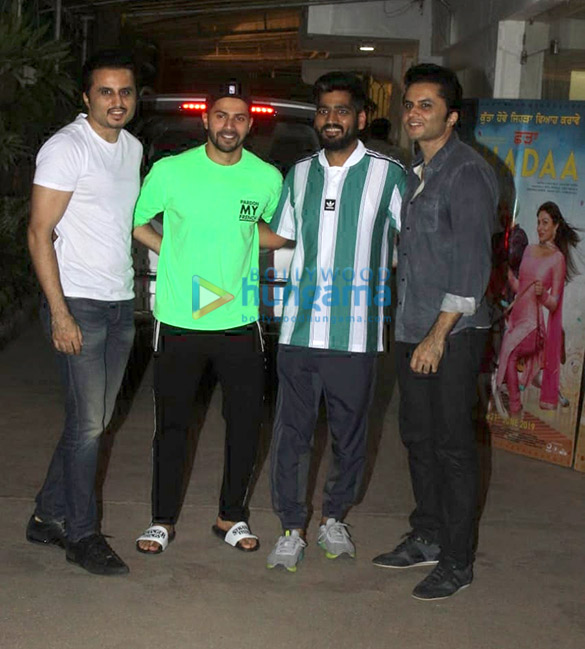
Director Jagdeep Sidhu with Varun Dhawan at screening of Shadaa

The film will be distributed by Omjee Group in East Punjab territory and by Narishma Enterprises in Delhi-UP and the rest of India. The overseas market will be covered by White Hill Studios. The film was released on around 500 screens in India on around 375 theatres including 300 screens in East Punjab. The film was originally scheduled to be released on 24 May but was released on 21 June 2019.

== Home video ==
The film was made available as VOD on Amazon Prime Video in August 2019.

== Reception ==
=== Box office ===
Shadaa has grossed over ₹52 crore worldwide in its theatrical run, becoming second highest-grossing Punjabi film of all time behind Carry On Jatta 2. The film has grossed over $2,650,000 at overseas making it fourth highest-grossing Punjabi film at overseas behind Chal Mera Putt, Chaar Sahibzaade, and Ardaas Karaan.

==== India ====
Shadaa got extraordinary advance as a Punjabi film. The film remained the first choice even in some cities Haryana. The advance of Shaada was three times of Kabir Singh at multiplexes of Punjab. The film was opened with an occupancy of 70-75% in East Punjab. The film grossed ₹3.1 crore and netted ₹2.6 crore in India including ₹2.05 crore nett from East Punjab on its opening day, making all-time record for Punjabi cinema beating the previous record of Carry On Jatta 2 (₹3.01 crore). The film grossed ₹3.05 crore nett in India with a growth of 20% on its second day, and became a second Punjabi film to nett above ₹3 crore in a single day after Carry On Jatta 2. On its third day, the film grossed ₹3.6 crore nett, making a weekend total of ₹9.25 crore nett and made all-time record weekend for Punjabi cinema beating Carry On Jatta 2 (₹8.3 crore nett).

On its first Monday, the film grossed ₹2.35 crore nett, footfalls on Monday were even higher than Friday. The film remained steady in weekdays as it grossed ₹2.1 and ₹2 crore nett on Tuesday and Wednesday respectively. The film grossed ₹1.75 crore nett on Thursday, making a week total of ₹17.45 crore nett which is the highest ever for Punjab film beating the 16.30 crore nett record of Carry On Jatta 2. The film dropped 20% from Thursday and 40% from its opening day on its second Friday and grossed ₹1.4 crore nett. Shadaa grossed ₹1.75 and ₹2.1 crore nett on its second Saturday and Sunday respectively, making a second weekend total of ₹5.25 crore nett which is less than Carry On Jatta 2.

==== Overseas ====
In its opening weekend, Shadaa grossed $775,000 from 125 odd theatres at international territories including ₹1.17 crore in United States, ₹2.14 crore in Canada, ₹61 lacs in United Kingdom and Ireland, ₹96 lacs in Australia, ₹32 lacs in New Zealand, ₹5 lacs in Germany, and ₹17 lacs in Gulf states. As of its second weekend, the film grossed $2,000,000 at overseas.

=== Critical reception ===
Gurnaaz Kaur of The Tribune gave three stars out of five and described the film as "laugh riot". Kaur described the story as usual but praised its wit and humour. She criticized Diljit as "loud and silly" but praised the performances of Neeru Bajwa and other supporting cast including Jagjeet Sandhu and Sonam Bajwa’s cameo. Jaspreet Nijher of Times Of India gave four out of five. Nijher praised the performances of entire cast, production work, editing, and the screenplay and direction by Jagdeep Sidhu. In last added, "Shadaa is a fresh, modern take on the old concept of romance, that promises to bring back optimism in love."

Ramit Bajaj of Film Companion praised the first two hours but criticized last half hour and described it "dragged" by Sidhu. He called Dosanjh's performance as usual but tad "too loud" at times while described Bajwa's performance as "effective". In last added, "The movie doesn’t explore the option of living life with a loved one without getting married. Even the leads aren’t shown to be self-sufficient enough to lead a life of singlehood. Yet, the movie offers a fresh take on some age-old practices like the girl’s family giving blankets to the boy’s side at the milni (a wedding tradition), or the difference between the turbans of the girl’s father and the guy’s father. But all this remains a prod, more than a poke."
