= Jersey (2019 film) =

2019 Indian film by Gowtam Tinnanuri

- Theatrical release poster
- Directed by: Gowtam Tinnanuri
- Written by: Gowtam Tinnanuri
- Produced by: Suryadevara Naga Vamsi
- Starring: Nani; Shraddha Srinath
- Cinematography: Sanu Varghese
- Edited by: Naveen Nooli
- Music by: Anirudh Ravichander
- Production company: Sithara Entertainments
- Distributed by: Zee Studios
- Release date: 19 April 2019
- Running time: 160 minutes
- Country: India
- Language: Telugu
- Budget: ₹25 crore
- Box office: ₹51.70 crore

Jersey is a 2019 Indian Telugu-language sports drama film written and directed by Gowtam Tinnanuri and produced by Suryadevara Naga Vamsi, under Sithara Entertainments. It stars Nani and Shraddha Srinath with Ronit Kamra, Sathyaraj, Harish Kalyan, Sanusha, Sampath Raj and Viswant Duddumpudi in pivotal roles. The music was composed by Anirudh Ravichander, while cinematography and editing were handled by Sanu John Varghese and Naveen Nooli respectively.

The storyline follows Arjun (Nani), a talented but failed cricketer who decides to return to cricket in his mid-30s, driven by the desire to represent the Indian cricket team, and fulfill his son's wish for a national team jersey as a gift. Principal photography of the film commenced on 18 October 2018 and was completed in late-March 2019.

Jersey was released worldwide on 19 April 2019, receiving critical acclaim with praise for its direction, plot, screenplay, editing, music, score, emotional weight and cast performances (especially from Nani and Kamra). Several reviewers listed the film as one of the "Best Telugu films of the decade". Nani's performance in the film was highly appreciated by most critics, with Film Companion ranking his performance as one of his career's best and in the list of 100 Greatest Performances of the Decade. The film won two National Film Awards: Best Feature Film – Telugu and Best Editing (Nooli). It further won two Critics Choice, Zee Cine Awards Telugu and four South Indian International Movie Awards. The film was also screened at the International Indian Toronto Film Festival in August 2020. In 2022, Tinnanuri also helmed the Hindi remake of the film, sharing the same title. It also won the state Gaddar Award for Second Best Feature Film,

== Plot ==
In 2019, New York City, a young man named Nani visits a bookstore and purchases a book titled Jersey. Shortly after, a woman arrives inquiring about the same book. Without hesitation, Nani offers her his copy. When she asks why he was so willing to part with it, Nani explains that the book chronicles the life of his father, Arjun. Soon after, he receives a call from the BCCI, inviting him to a ceremony honoring his late father’s contributions to cricket. At the event, attended by his mother Sarah, Arjun’s friends, BCCI officials, and former cricketers, Nani is presented with a special Indian cricket team jersey bearing the name “Arjun,” evoking vivid memories of his father’s life.

The story flashes back to Hyderabad in 1986, where Arjun is a talented Ranji Trophy cricketer with aspirations of representing India. Despite his talent, he faces repeated rejection due to selection politics, eventually leading to disillusionment and his withdrawal from professional cricket. Arjun secures a government job through the sports quota but loses it after being falsely accused of bribery, compounding his struggles. By 1996, Arjun, now 36, is unemployed and struggling to support his family. Sarah frequently urges him to legally clear his name, while their young son, Nani, asks for an Indian cricket team jersey for his birthday. Though financially strained, Arjun promises to fulfill his son’s wish.

Desperate to provide for his son, Arjun seeks assistance from friends, but none are willing to help. His former coach, Murthy, arranges for him to play in a charity match between Hyderabad and a visiting New Zealand team, with a promised fee of ₹1,000 intended to fund the jersey. Arjun delivers an exceptional performance, only to discover that the match was entirely charitable and offered no compensation. Frustrated and overwhelmed, he reacts harshly when Nani asks about the jersey again, an incident he later deeply regrets.

Motivated by his son’s admiration and love, Arjun resolves to return to cricket, despite his age. Coach Murthy, though initially skeptical, supports him. Arjun attends the Ranji selection trials, where he is mocked and rejected due to his age. A subsequent article by journalist Ramya, highlighting his perseverance and dedication, persuades the selectors to give him an opportunity. Arjun capitalizes on this chance, performing brilliantly and earning a place on the Hyderabad team.

Meanwhile, Sarah’s father offers to fund a legal case to help Arjun reclaim his previous job, but Arjun, finding renewed purpose in cricket, declines. During the semifinals, he leads his team to victory despite suffering severe chest pains. Though doctors urge him to undergo medical tests, financial constraints and commitment to the game compel him to continue. In the Ranji Trophy final, Hyderabad faces adversity, yet Arjun rises to the occasion, guiding the team to a remarkable victory before collapsing shortly afterward.

Returning to 2019, Nani recounts at the felicitation that Arjun had secretly suffered from arrhythmia since the age of 26. His earlier withdrawal from cricket was not due to weakness, but illness. Yet, when it mattered most, he returned to the sport, risking everything to fulfill a simple promise to his son. Arjun’s journey demonstrates that it is never too late to pursue one’s dreams and that dedication and perseverance can transcend age and circumstance.

== Cast ==
- Nani as Arjun G.
- Shraddha Srinath as Sarah Fernandes, Arjun's wife
- Ronit Kamra as Nani, Arjun's son
  - Harish Kalyan as Adult Nani, in a cameo appearance (voice dubbed by Nani)
- Sathyaraj as Coach Murthy
- Viswant Duddumpudi as Nandan "Nandu" Reddy
- Sanusha as Journalist Ramya, Nandu's girlfriend
- Sampath Raj as Ramappa Gowda, Karnataka coach
- Shishir Sharma as Atul, Mumbai coach
- Praveen as Rajesh, Arjun's friend
- Jayaprakash as the BCCI Chairman
- Rao Ramesh as a Lawyer
- Brahmaji as Raju, an aspiring actor
- Sanjay Swaroop as Paul, Sarah's father
- Anchor Sowmya as Padhoo
- Aaron Bleakley as the New Zealand captain
- Matthew Jackson as a New Zealand cricketer
- Finn Hulbert as a New Zealand cricketer
- Philip Murgatroyd as a New Zealand cricketer

== Production ==
=== Development ===
In June 2018, Nani was reported to sign his 23rd film with Gowtam Tinnanuri, who made his debut with Malli Raava (2018), which was officially announced at the second season of the Bigg Boss Telugu show, which commenced on 10 June 2018. A first look poster was released on 15 June 2018, revealing the title as Jersey. The poster featured a cricket jersey with the name "Arjun", who is a struggling 36 year old cricketer played by Nani in the lead role. The film was set up in the period of 1986 and 1996. Director Gowtam Tinnanuri noted that the film is not based on the life of late cricketer Raman Lamba.

The pre-production work of the film took place soon after its announcement, and makers decided to start the shoot in September 2018, only after finalising the cast and crew members. While Nani had undergone a special training in cricket, for three and half hours per day, to fit into his role. Followed by the success of Bigg Boss Season 2, Nani decided to increase the remuneration by ₹4 crore to ₹6 crore. However, Nani signed the film free of cost and also opting for a profit-sharing basis, due to major constraints in the film's budget.

=== Casting ===
Anirudh Ravichander announced that he will be composing music for the project, which marks his second film in Telugu after Agnyaathavaasi. The technical crew also included Sanu John Vargehse, Naveen Nooli and Avinash Kolla as the cinematographer, editor and art director respectively. Initially Reba Monica John and Kashmira Pardeshi were roped in as the female leads for the film. Later, Shraddha Srinath was finalised to star opposite Nani. Shraddha claimed that the film's script based on sports is about "emotions and relationships". Harish Kalyan, Sathyaraj and Sampath Raj were signed in other prominent roles. While Adah Sharma was reported to act in a special song in the film, it was claimed as baseless rumours, since the actress did not confirm her presence.

=== Filming ===
The film was launched on 17 October 2018, with the presence of the crew members, whilst Trivikram Srinivas attending the ceremony as the chief guest. Principal photography commenced the very following day, and was held at various places across Hyderabad. It was revealed that 250 cast and crew members were involved in the making of the film. The main cricket match that takes place in the film was apparently shot in 24 days on two international and five domestic cricket grounds. 130 professional cricket players were also roped in to be extras for these scenes, with 18 of them coming in from England. It was revealed that the shooting of the film was wrapped up in March 2019. Post-release the director had shot two climaxes for the film, however there was no change in the climax scene after Nani condemned rumours about the film.

== Themes and analysis ==
In an interview with The Indian Express, director Tinnanuri stated about the film's plotline which deals with late bloomers, who want to aspire in the sports field, but they face difficulties from doing so. He further added:

The basic plot revolves around the concept of late bloomers. Some people pursue their dreams only after a certain age and they still achieve success. They are known as late bloomers. We have plenty of examples and success stories with regards to it in different fields. But, in the case of sports, the late bloomer concept is somewhat difficult to apply. Because the sports field demands physical fitness. After a certain age, competing in any sports becomes tough. Likewise, Jersey is the story of a man who is settled in life with his wife and kid but aspires to be an Indian cricketer. The story also includes the reasons behind his dream and what he has done to achieve it during the process.

While some claimed that the film is based on the life of Raman Lamba, Nani and director Tinnanuri claimed that it is a fictional story.

== Soundtrack ==
The film's soundtrack album and background score were composed by Anirudh Ravichander in his second Telugu project after Agnyaathavaasi (2018). The album featuring five tracks had lyrics written by Krishna Kanth; four of the tracks were released as singles before the album release on 17 April 2019. Later, two of the tracks were released as bonus singles after the film's release – the first track "Aarambhame Le" was unveiled on 24 April and another track "Nuvvadiginadhe" was released along with the original background score on 13 May 2019.

== Marketing and release ==
The first look poster of the film was released on New Year's Eve, 31 December 2018. The official teaser of the film was released on 12 January 2019, and received praise for the portrayal of Nani's character as a cricketer in their mid-30s. On 9 March 2019, the movie team released a new poster, with resemblance to a magazine cover, which gained attention from film buffs. The official trailer of the film was released on 12 April 2019. The film's pre-release event was held at Shilpakala Vedika in Hyderabad on 15 April, with Venkatesh attending the event as the chief guest, in presence of the film's cast and crew.

The film received a U certificate from the Central Board of Film Certification without any cuts, and released worldwide on 19 April 2019. Although the film was expected to be released simultaneously in Tamil, the dubbed version was released on Sun NXT on 27 March 2021 as The Cricketer: My Dear Father. The film was also dubbed and released in Hindi on television and YouTube by Goldmines Telefilms on 13 October 2019.

== Reception ==
Jersey received unanimous critical acclaim, especially for Nani's performance, Tinnanuri's screenplay and emotional sequences. On the review aggregator website Rotten Tomatoes, 71% of 7 critics' reviews are positive, with an average rating of 7.3/10.

Neetishta Nyayapati of The Times of India gave 4 out of 5 stars stating, "Jersey will make you laugh, cry and cheer out loud. A while into the film, Nani simply ceases to exist and it is only cricketer Arjun you see." The Indian Express gave 4 out of 5 stars stating, "Not just drama, Jersey has enough cricketing moments to draw you to the edge of the seat. Gowtam exactly knows how much of cricket should be shown at a given point in the narration, so that the game doesn't overshadow the human drama." Writing for the Hindustan Times, Haricharan Pudipeddi gave 4 out of 5 stars stating, "Jersey manages to showcase the cricket games as convincingly as possible. The effort that has gone into getting trained for his character is quite visible in Nani’s performance. From the stands to the shots and the follow through, Nani gets the body language of a batsman right and is a treat to watch while playing." Firstpost gave 4 out of 5 stars stating "Jersey packs in so many emotional moments that it'll leave you with a heavy heart and loads of tears. It's a blessing that this film exists in Telugu. Watch it, cherish it, and soak yourself in the world of Jersey. They don't make such films so often these days."

Sify gave 3.5 out of 5 stars stating, "Jersey is a refreshing and compelling sports drama and the film offers many heart-warming moments. Climax sequence is superb. Nani's brilliant performance, emotional scenes and honest narration makes this a good movie." Sangeetha Devi Dundoo of The Hindu wrote, "Gowtam Tinnanuri presents an endearing sports drama backed by strong performances."

Film Companion wrote, "There are a few simple-yet-touching moments that safely put Jersey in a league of its own." India Today gave 3.5 out of 5 stars and wrote, "Director Gowtam Tinnanuri's Jersey is not just your regular sports drama. It is an emotional film that talks about a disgruntled cricketer's life, his ever-supporting wife and what it is like to be back to doing what you once considered your life." Suresh Kavirayani of Deccan Chronicle gave 3.5 out of 5 stars and wrote, "Keeping the best for last, Gowtam ends the film with a twist which enhances the tale." Sowmya Rajendran of The News Minute gave 4 out of 5 stars and wrote, "The sports drama genre, be it fictional or biopics, is in vogue in Indian cinema. Gowtam Tinnanuri’s biggest challenge with Jersey, therefore, was to not sound too predictable. But the director pulls it off by choosing to tell a story about failure rather than success. Both Shraddha and Nani are terrific together, portraying two guilt-ridden people who don’t know how to bridge the widening gap between them."

== Accolades ==
Award (Note: Awards, festivals and organizations are in alphabetical order.)	Date of ceremony (Note: Date is linked to the article about the awards held that year, wherever possible.)	Category	Recipient(s)	Result	Ref.
Critics Choice Film Awards	28 March 2020	Best Film	Jersey	Nominated	
Critics Choice Film Awards	28 March 2020	Best Director	Gowtam Tinnanuri	Won	
Critics Choice Film Awards	28 March 2020	Best Actor – Male	Nani	Won	
Critics Choice Film Awards	28 March 2020	Best Actor – Female	Shraddha Srinath	Nominated	
Critics Choice Film Awards	28 March 2020	Best Writing	Gowtam Tinnanuri	Nominated	
National Film Awards	22 March 2021	Best Feature Film – Telugu	Naga Vamsi (producer); Gowtam Tinnanuri (director)	Won	
National Film Awards	22 March 2021	Best Editing	Naveen Nooli	Won	
South Indian International Movie Awards	18 September 2021	Best Film – Telugu	Sithara Entertainments	Won	
South Indian International Movie Awards	18 September 2021	Best Director – Telugu	Gowtam Tinnanuri	Nominated	
South Indian International Movie Awards	18 September 2021	Best Actor – Telugu	Nani	Nominated	
South Indian International Movie Awards	18 September 2021	Best Actress – Telugu	Shraddha Srinath	Nominated	
South Indian International Movie Awards	18 September 2021	Best Music Director – Telugu	Anirudh Ravichander	Nominated	
South Indian International Movie Awards	18 September 2021	Best Lyricist – Telugu	Krishna Kanth – (for "Needa Padadhani")	Nominated	
South Indian International Movie Awards	18 September 2021	Best Cinematographer – Telugu	Sanu Varghese	Won	
South Indian International Movie Awards	18 September 2021	Best Actor – Telugu (Critics)	Nani	Won	
South Indian International Movie Awards	18 September 2021	Entertainer of the Year – Telugu	Nani	Won	
Zee Cine Awards Telugu	11 January 2020	Favorite Actor of the Year	Nani	Won	
Zee Cine Awards Telugu	11 January 2020	Best Find of the Year – Female	Shraddha Srinath	Won	

== Remake ==
Jersey has been remade in Hindi with the same title by Tinnanuri himself, marking as his Hindi directorial debut and produced by Dil Raju, Allu Aravind and Aman Gill under Sri Venkateswara Creations and Geetha Arts. The film stars Shahid Kapoor and Mrunal Thakur.
