= Gowtam Tinnanuri =

Indian filmmaker

- Born: Rajahmundry, Andhra Pradesh, India
- Occupations: Film director, screenwriter
- Years active: 2017–present

Gowtam Tinnanuri is an Indian film director and screenwriter who works primarily in Telugu cinema. He made his directorial debut with Malli Raava (2017) and gained widespread acclaim for the sports drama Jersey, which won several awards including the National Film Award for Best Feature Film in Telugu. He also directed the Hindi remake of Jersey (2022), starring Shahid Kapoor. His recent releases include the Telugu spy thriller Kingdom (2025), and he has other projects in development, including the Telugu film Magic.

== Career ==
Gowtam Tinnanuri began his career in Telugu cinema with Malli Raava (2017), a romantic drama. He subsequently directed Jersey, a sports drama about a cricketer making a comeback in his late 30s. The film performed well commercially and received several awards, including the National Film Award for Best Feature Film in Telugu and the Critics Choice Film Award for Best Director. The success of Jersey led to a Hindi-language remake in 2022, also directed by Tinnanuri, starring Shahid Kapoor.

In addition to feature films, Tinnanuri wrote the bilingual web series Lots of Love (LOL) (2019), released on MX Player.

== Filmography ==
Year	Title	Notes
2017	Malli Raava	
2019	Jersey	
2022	Jersey	Hindi film; Remake of Jersey (2019)
2025	Kingdom	
TBA	Magic †	Delayed
TBA	MS: A legacy on screen †	Filming

=== Television ===
Year	Title	Credited as	Language	Network	Notes
2019	Lots of Love (LOL)	Writer	Telugu; Tamil	MX Player	

== Awards and nominations ==
Year	Award	Category	Work	Result	Ref.
2020	Critics Choice Film Awards	Best Director	Jersey	Won	
2021	National Film Awards	Best Feature Film – Telugu	Jersey	Won	
2021	South Indian International Movie Awards	Best Director – Telugu	Jersey	Nominated	
