= Sunny Gill =

Canadian-born Indian actor

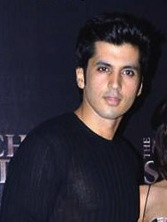
- Sunny Gill
- Born: Vancouver, British Columbia
- Occupations: Actor, Model
- Known for: Jo Hum Chahein
- Website: Official Facebook Page; Official Twitter Handle

Sunny Gill is a Canadian-born Indian actor of Punjabi origin who made his Bollywood debut in the film Jo Hum Chahein in December 2011. He was placed 7th on the Times of India's "Most Promising Newcomers of 2011" list, where they praised him for his good looks and nuanced performance. Prior to his debut as an actor he was a model who had done print and ramp assignments.

== Biography ==
Sunny Gill was born in Vancouver, British Columbia, Canada, to Jat Sikh Punjabi parents. He migrated to Mumbai to pursue a career in the entertainment industry.

== Modelling career ==
He started his modelling career after being noticed by fashion designers Abu Jani & Sandeep Khosla. He then went on to work at the Lakme and Wills India Fashion Weeks, and at Global Hindi Film Awards Shows like GIFA and IIFA. At the IIFA show in Dubai he was complimented by Amitabh Bachchan for his work on the ramp. He also featured in several TV commercials including a Brylcreem hair gel commercial and was in the Jagjit Singh music video Raat Khamosh Hai and another video for VJ Sophie Choudry, Mera Babu Chhail Chhabila.

== Film career ==
Gill made his acting debut in the Bollywood film Jo Hum Chahein opposite Simran Mundi on 16 December 2011. The film didn't work at the box office, but he was noticed and appreciated by critics for his performance. Gaurav Malani of The Times Of India said "Sunny makes a handsome and confident debut, he's natural in his act and appeal and has good screen presence." Swati Rohatgi of Stardust India said "Sunny looks good, is highly confident and showcases his range of acting, confidently executing dramatic, emotional and romantic scenes." Joginder Tuteja of India Glitz said "Sunny opens his Bollywood innings well, he has the Bollywood quotient right and boasts of fantastic looks." Taran Adarsh of Bollywood Hungama said "Sunny renders his character with tremendous sincerity, it's a bona fide character and Sunny's performance makes it all the more relatable."

He was the only male debutant in Mid-Day's list of most-promising newcomers of 2011, Yahoo India featured him on their most-promising newcomers of 2011 list, and Times of India placed him seventh on their list of male debuts of 2011.

== Filmography ==
- 2011 Jo Hum Chahein as Rohan Bhatia
- 2014 Mundeyan Ton Bachke Rahin
- 2022 Ni Main Sass Kutni
