= Sachin Gupta (musician) =

Indian film producer, writer and director (born 1981)

- Born: Sachin Gupta; 12 August 1981 (age 44); New Delhi, India
- Genres: Rock
- Occupations: Music director, guitar player, singer
- Instrument: Guitar
- Label: Tips Music
- Spouse: Zara Khan (m. 2014–2015)

Sachin Gupta (born 12 August 1981) is an Indian music director, composer, guitarist, record producer and a singer. His work has spanned everything from playing live shows with his previous band Mrigya to composing indie pop albums for artists like Atif Aslam, Alisha Chinoy, Jal, Ahmed Jahanzeb, Apache Indian and Mika among others. Termed by international media as "Flying Finger Melodies", his music, as he says, is inspired by real life instances, while his guitar playing has been heavily influenced by Yngwie Malmsteen.

== Biography ==
Sachin Gupta was born in a family of doctors and has studied science at school level. He was in Frank Anthony School and spent a couple of years in Apeejay School in New Delhi. Having gotten through IIT-Delhi in Mechanical Engineering, Sachin decided to instead study physics (honours) and went to Sri Venkateswara College in Delhi University. But after a year, he moved to study B.Com (Hons) at Shahid Bhagat Singh College while pursuing music simultaneously. He was introduced to the guitar at the age of 7 by his mother and ever since, he took music as his calling in life. He has performed at over 600 concerts across various countries including Dubai, London, Singapore, New Zealand and Australia that has included major music festivals such as the Jazz Fest, Edinburgh Fest and Scotland Fest. He met with the Vice-President of TIPS Films in London during one of his shows, and he moved to Mumbai in 2005. A progression into Bollywood came naturally to him.

He married Sasha Agha, the daughter of Salma Agha, in 2014. However, the relationship did not run smoothly and they separated in 2015.

== Career ==
=== Indie pop ===
Sachin has made a variety of songs under various genres. His rock tones in his compositions for Atif Aslam's Doorie brought him fame in dismal indie music scene. He has composed and produced tracks on Mika's album Dunali, Ashok Masti's Clap on the Beat and Alisha Chinnoy's Shut Up N Kiss Me. He also produced tracks for Apache Indian and UK based Khiza. Other names include Pakistani artists Jal, Adeel and Ahmed Jahanzeb. Presently Sachin is working on two Indian bands, Rooh and Ni9NE.

=== Film career ===
Sachin ventured into Bollywood with the two promotional tracks called Yaad Aaye Woh Din and Farishta for the Jimmy Shergill-KK Menon starrer Strangers released in 2007. His first full-fledged film is Dil Kabaddi that stars Irrfan Khan, Soha Ali Khan, Rahul Bose, Konkona Sen Sharma and Rahul Khanna.

He was featured in Prince, a TIPS film with Kumar Taurani that has Viveik Oberoi in the lead. His second film was Manoj Bajpai starrer Jugaad. His music for the movie Jo Hum Chahein had lyrics by Kumaar, his next film album is for Yash Raj Films youth film division Y-Films production Mere Dad Ki Maruti where he teams up with lyricist Kumaar again.

== Filmography ==
=== As A Music Director ===
Year	Film	Notes
2013	Table No. 21	
2013	Mere Dad Ki Maruti	
2013	Yamla Pagla Deewana 2	Promo Track - Aidaan Hi Nachna
2013	Issaq	2 songs
2011	Jo Hum Chahein	
2011	Damadamm!	27 October 2011; 1 Song With Himesh Reshammiya
2011	Will you marry me?	2 songs
2011	Warning	5 August 2011
2011	Chalo Dilli	
2010	Prince	9 April 2010; Full soundtrack (all songs)
2009	Bolo Raam	
2009	Jugaad	13 February 2009
2008	Dil Kabaddi	5 December 2008; Full soundtrack
2006	Doorie	22 December 2006

=== As a Singer ===
Year	Film	Song name	Co-Singers
2013	Issaq	Aag Ka Dariya (Unplugged)	
2013	Issaq	Bhole Chale	Rahul Ram
2011	Will you marry me?	Tu ru tu ru tu	Monali Thakur
2011	Damadamm!	Bhool Jaaun	Himesh Reshammiya
2010	Prince	Tere Liye (Unplugged)	Solo
2009	Jugaad	Tension Lene Ka Nahi – Remix	Aditya Jassi
2008	Dil Kabaddi	Ehsaan	Jaspreet Singh
