= Jersey (2022 film) =

2022 Indian film by Gowtam Tinnanuri

- Theatrical release poster
- Directed by: Gowtam Tinnanuri
- Written by: Gowtam Tinnanuri
- Based on: Jersey (2019)
- Produced by: Dil Raju; Allu Aravind; Naga Vamsi; Aman Gill
- Starring: Shahid Kapoor; Mrunal Thakur; Pankaj Kapur
- Cinematography: Anil Mehta
- Edited by: Naveen Nooli
- Music by: Score: Anirudh Ravichander; Songs: Sachet–Parampara
- Production companies: Allu Entertainment; Dil Raju Production; Sithara Entertainments; Brat Films
- Distributed by: Balaji Motion Pictures; Pen Marudhar Entertainment (India); Yash Raj Films; Phars Film Co (overseas)
- Release date: 22 April 2022
- Running time: 170 minutes
- Country: India
- Language: Hindi
- Budget: ₹80 crore
- Box office: est. ₹27.9 crore

Jersey is a 2022 Indian Hindi-language sports drama film written and directed by Gowtam Tinnanuri, in his Hindi directorial debut. It is a remake of his 2019 Telugu film of the same title. It stars Shahid Kapoor as a former cricketer who returns to the game for his son's wish of buying a Jersey T- Shirt, alongside Mrunal Thakur and Pankaj Kapoor. The film is produced by Geetha Arts, Dil Raju Production, Sithara Entertainments and Brat Films.

The film was officially announced in October 2019. Principal photography commenced in Chandigarh in December 2019 and ended in December 2020, amidst delays caused by the COVID-19 pandemic. Jersey was originally scheduled for a theatrical release on 28 August 2020 but was postponed multiple times due to the COVID-19 pandemic. The film was theatrically released on 22 April 2022. Despite receiving positive reviews from critics who praised Kapoor's performance, Jersey was a failure at the box office.

== Plot ==
26-year-old Arjun Talwar is an extraordinary cricketer from Chandigarh with the highest batting average in all of India and 106 half-centuries, fifty-two centuries, nine double centuries and two triple centuries to his name. Following the 1985-86 Duleep Trophy finals, Arjun awaits news of his selection in the India national team, only to find out his inclusion in the list was a misprint. Following this, he quits cricket. Arjun then applies for a job in the food sector and shortly after marries his girlfriend Vidya, with whom he has a son named Ketan, nicknamed Kittu. However, sometime in the early 1990s, Arjun is suspended from his job on corruption charges, although he is innocent.

In 1996, Arjun lives with Vidya and Kittu in a dilapidated house in Chandigarh, with Vidya struggling to make ends meet as a hotel receptionist. There is a flashback to their love story. Vidya marries Arjun despite her father's opposition.

Meanwhile in the present, Kittu loves playing cricket, much like Arjun did. He wishes to get a jersey of the Indian national team for his upcoming birthday. Arjun tries getting one, but finds out it is very expensive; he then tries to loan the jersey in vain and Vidya refuses to lend him money for the same. His friends try pooling funds for the jersey, but fall quite short of the budget. Arjun's former coach Baali Sir approaches him to inform him of an upcoming charity match between Punjab and New Zealand, with players' fees included. Arjun's friend lies that Arjun has agreed to play, forcing Arjun to practice for the match late at night.

The next day, the New Zealand team bats impressively and sets a high target for Punjab. At first, Punjab seems to be losing the match, with very few runs and wickets falling quick. Arjun is sent onto the pitch, hitting fours and sixes with ease. Although the Punjab team eventually loses the match by one run, Arjun is praised by many, especially Kittu, for his exceptional batting. However, he is dismayed to find out that players' fees are going to charity as well. Arjun, ashamed that he was unable to get his son a jersey, tells Baali Sir that he wants to get back up playing cricket.

Officials are skeptical about Arjun, a 36-year-old, playing cricket, thinking he will not do well and will quit again in a year or two. However, they then see him play during practice, amazed by how he is able to score easily. Selections for the upcoming Ranji Trophy are underway, with only 15 out of 30 of the trainees being selected. The results come in, and Arjun is ecstatic after finding out that his name in the list. The first few matches go well, with Arjun making centuries effortlessly and simultaneously earning his teammates' respect and teaching them some of his techniques. Meanwhile, Arjun's time on the field takes a toll on him, resulting in him having to go to the hospital for some tests. Although it is said he may not be able to play in the finals, Arjun nevertheless appears for the match against Karnataka at the Wankhede Stadium.

In the second half of the match, he is pitted against Gowda, a bowler from the Karnataka team who has effortlessly taken wickets of batsmen who had played prior in the match. Gowda proves to be a challenge to Arjun, who however manages to get to a century. Gowda tries many tricks to take Arjun's wicket. However, this does not deter Arjun from scoring. In the final over, the team barely manages to score runs due to the opposition's strong bowling and Arjun being on the non-striker end. On the final ball, Arjun needing three runs to win, attempts to hit a sixer. Despite risking being run out, Arjun manages to make the required runs for his team to win the match and the trophy.

In 2022, Jasleen Shergill, a journalist who supported Arjun during his comeback, writes a biography about him titled Jersey. At a function relating to the book, it is revealed that recently, a list of players selected for the Indian national team headed to England was found, with Arjun's name included in it. A grown-up Ketan is then called upon stage to receive a jersey with Arjun's name on it, thus fulfilling his childhood dream of getting a jersey. Ketan reveals that shortly after the Ranji finals, Arjun had to be admitted to the hospital, succumbing to heart failure caused by arrhythmia, something Arjun chose to keep a secret and the reason why he quit cricket. Ketan then ends his speech by stating that while people believed his father lost his life while trying, it was the opposite; even during hardships, Arjun never backed down till the very end.

== Cast ==
- Shahid Kapoor as Arjun Talwar
- Mrunal Thakur as Vidya Rao Talwar, Arjun's wife
- Pankaj Kapur as Baali, Arjun's coach
- Saurabh V Pandey as Ravindra Singh, Punjab cricket team’s captain
- Ronit Kamra as Ketan "Kittu" Talwar, Arjun and Vidya's son
  - Prit Kamani as adult Kittu
- Geetika Mehandru as Jasleen Shergill
- Major Rudrashish Majumder (Retd) as Rudra Juneja
- Anjum Batra as Amrit, Arjun's friend
- Rituraj Singh as Mahesh Karmarkar, Mumbai Coach
- Vinay Varma as Krishna Rao, Vidya's father

== Production ==
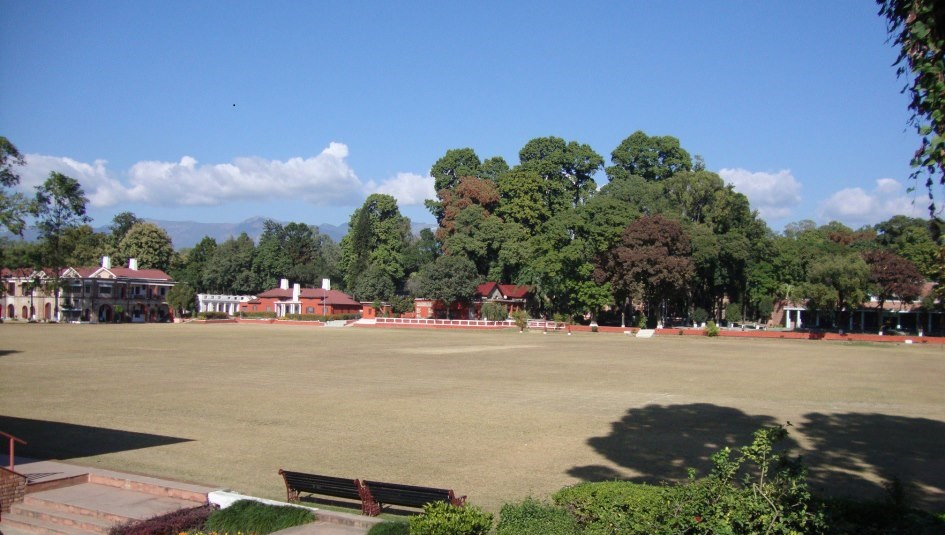
Main Field of The Doon School where some cricket scenes were filmed

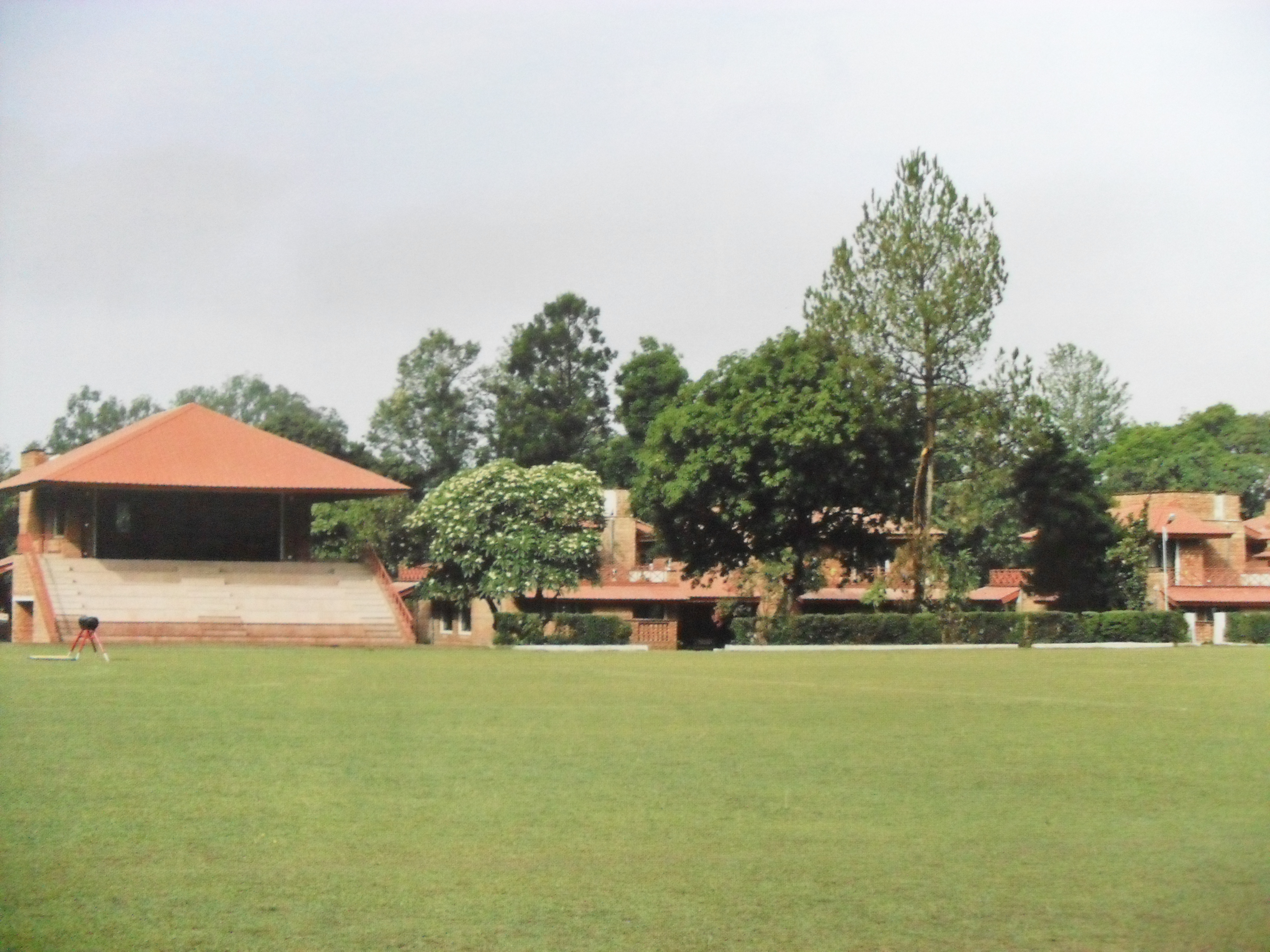
Doon's cricket pavilion where a song and a few scenes were shot.

Speculations for a remake of the Telugu film Jersey (2019) began soon after its release. Later it was reported that Shahid Kapoor has been roped in to star as the lead actor while Shraddha Kapoor was considered for the female lead. In August 2019, Kannada actress Rashmika Mandanna was considered to play the female lead in this film and it will be her Hindi debut film. Official announcement was made on 14 October that year, confirming all the cast and crew. But later Mrunal Thakur was finalised to cast in the movie Shahid's father Pankaj Kapur was roped in to portray Coach Murthy. The principal photography commenced on 14 December 2019 in Chandigarh.

While filming in January 2020, it was reported that Shahid Kapoor received thirteen stitches during a scene, though he later recovered. The filming was halted in March 2020 due to the COVID-19 pandemic. The filming was resumed in October 2020, production moved to Dehradun and filming took place at the all-boys' boarding school, The Doon School, and Kasiga School. Doon's cricket grounds, buildings and pavilion feature in the film and the trailer. The final schedule of the film took place at the Mohali Stadium in Punjab, and strict bio bubbles and quarantine rules were put in place for the safety of cast and crew. The filming wrapped up on 14 December 2020.

== Music ==
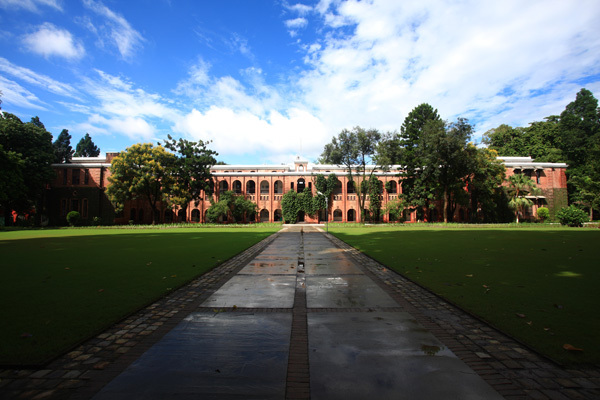
The song Baliye Re was filmed in front of the Main Building at The Doon School.

Jersey

Soundtrack album by Sachet–Parampara
- Released: 24 December 2021
- Recorded: 2019–2020
- Genre: Feature film soundtrack
- Length: 14:43
- Language: Punjabi/Hindi
- Label: Zee Music Company

Sachet–Parampara chronology
Baaghi 3 (2020)	Jersey (2021)	Adipurush (2023)

Official audio
- Jersey – Full Album on YouTube

The film's songs are composed by Sachet–Parampara while the lyrics are written by Shellee. The film score is composed by Anirudh Ravichander who composed the score and soundtrack for the original Telugu version. The film version of 'Jind Meriye' is sung by Javed Ali. 'Maiyya Mainu' second version was sung by Sakshi Holkar.

Track listing
No.	Title	Singer(s)	Length
1.	"Mehram"	Sachet Tandon	3:47
2.	"Maiyya Mainu"	Sachet Tandon	3:51
3.	"Baliye Re"	Sachet Tandon, Stebin Ben, Paramapara Tandon, Mellow D	3:07
4.	"Jind Meriye"	Sachet Tandon	3:58
Total length:			14:43

== Release ==
Jersey was released on 22 April 2022. The film was initially scheduled to be theatrically released on 28 August 2020 and then on 5 November 2021, before the COVID-19 pandemic delayed production. It was later on again finalised for cinema release on 31 December 2021, but was indefinitely postponed due to the Omicron variant spread. Release date was revised later as 14 April 2022, but it was pushed by a week to avoid clash with Beast and K.G.F: Chapter 2.

=== Home media ===
The film premiered on Netflix on 20 May 2022.

=== Distribution ===
The film was distributed in India by Balaji Motion Pictures and Pen Marudhar Entertainment while overseas distribution was done by Yash Raj Films and Phars Film Co.

== Reception ==
=== Box office ===
Jersey earned ₹3.75 crore at the domestic box office on its opening day. On the second day, the film collected ₹5.50 crore. On the third day, the film collected ₹5.50 crore, taking total domestic weekend collection to ₹14.75 crore.

As of 7 May 2022, the film grossed ₹22.65 crore in India and ₹4.47 crore overseas, for a worldwide gross collection of ₹27.12 crore. Jersey performed poorly at the box office despite positive reception from critics. Ganesh Aaglave of Firstpost attributed to the film's failure to the box office clash with K.G.F: Chapter 2, a recent overdose of remakes of South Indian films, availability of the Hindi dubbed version of the original film on YouTube for free, and average music compared to Shahid Kapoor's previous remake film Kabir Singh (2019).

=== Critical response ===
Jersey received positive reviews with critics lauding the intent of the film and Shahid's performance. On the review aggregator website Rotten Tomatoes, 50% of 10 critics' reviews are positive, with an average rating of 5.5/10.

Pankaj Shukla of Amar Ujala gave the film a rating of 4/5. A reviewer from Prabhat Khabar gave the film a rating of 3.5/5. Archika Khurana of The Times Of India gave the film a rating of 3.5/5 and wrote, "This film leans more on emotional drama, while it could have struck a finer balance between the sports and the human drama." Himesh Mankad of Pinkvilla gave the film a rating of 3.5/5 and wrote, "Jersey is a well-intentioned sport drama, which much like the original, has heart at its right place. It rides on superlative performance by Shahid Kapoor, who rises to roar and revolt as a cricketer." Devansh Sharma of Firstpost gave the film a rating of 3.5/5 and wrote, "Jersey makes us find great comfort in familiarity. It's honest, but could have also been innovative and intricate." Sukanya Verma of Rediff gave the film a rating of 3.5/5 and wrote, "Jersey is a sweet little drama that hits a home run on the strength of its heart and hero."

A reviewer of Bollywood Hungama gave the film a rating of 3/5 and wrote, "While Shahid Kapoor Jersey scores with its performance and touching finale, the slow pace and opposition from KGF 2 will limit its box office prospects." Bharathi Pradhan of Lehren gave the film a rating of 3/5 and wrote, "Shahid Kapoor looks and enacts his part as cricketer, lover and father with impressive credibility." Tushar Joshi of India Today gave the film a rating of 3/5 and wrote, "Jersey is a solid effort by Shahid Kapoor and it once again proves his mettle as an actor." He also praised the acting of Mrunal Thakur and Pankaj Kapoor.

Shubhra Gupta of The Indian Express gave the film a rating of 2.5/5 and wrote, "Shahid Kapoor-Mrunal Thakur-starrer film, an official remake of the 2019 Telugu hit of the same name and by the same director, has all the elements of an inspirational sports drama." Saibal Chatterjee of NDTV gave the film a rating of 2.5/5 and wrote, "On the acting front, Shahid is the Man of the Match. The team effort behind him is strengthened by the performances from Mrunal Thakur and Ronit Kamra, a confident child actor." Monika Rawal Kukreja of The Hindustan Times stated, "Shahid Kapoor delivers one of his best performances. However, the film's length works against it." Anuj Kumar of The Hindu stated, "Despite heartwarming moments, 'Jersey' suffers from logical loopholes and a sense of deja vu."

== Awards and nominations ==
Year	Award	Category	Recipient	Result	Ref.
2023	68th Filmfare Awards	Best Actor - Critics	Shahid Kapoor	Nominated	
2023	68th Filmfare Awards	Best Lyricist	Shellee (for "Maiyya Mainu")	Nominated	
