= Malli Raava =

2017 Telugu film

- Theatrical release poster
- Directed by: Gowtam Tinnanuri
- Written by: Gowtam Tinnanuri
- Produced by: Rahul Yadav Nakka
- Starring: Sumanth; Aakanksha Singh; Abhinav Gomatam; Annapoorna; Preethi Asrani; Sathwik Varma
- Cinematography: Satish Mutyala
- Edited by: Satya Giduturi
- Music by: Shravan Bharadwaj
- Release date: 8 December 2017
- Running time: 124 minutes
- Country: India
- Language: Telugu

Malli Raava (transl. Come back again) is a 2017 Indian Telugu-language romantic drama film written and directed by debutant Gowtam Tinnanuri, and produced by Rahul Yadav Nakka. The film stars Sumanth and Aakanksha Singh, the latter making her debut in Telugu cinema. The music is composed by Shravan Bharadwaj. The film was released on 8 December 2017, received positive reviews from critics, and went to become a box office hit

== Plot ==
A love story between Karthik and Anjali whose paths cross during three different stages of their lives.

== Cast ==
- Sumanth as Karthik
- Aakanksha Singh as Anjali
- Abhinav Gomatam as Subbu / Dumbo
- Annapoorna as Subbu / Dumbo's grandmother
- Preethi Asrani as Young Anjali
- Sathwik Varma as Young Karthik
- Karthik Adusumalli as Murali
- Anithanath as Sushma, Anjali's mother
- Appaji Ambarisha Darbha as Mohan, Anjali's father
- Mirchi Kiran as Manager Sowmitri
- Lahari Shari as Samyuktha, Subbu / Dumbo's Wife
- Kadambari Kiran as Social Studies Teacher

== Soundtrack ==
Malli Raava

Soundtrack album by Shravan Bharadwaj
- Released: 2017
- Recorded: 2017
- Genre: Feature film soundtrack
- Length: 22:30
- Label: Madhura Audio
- Producer: Shravan Bharadwaj

Shravan Bharadwaj chronology
Meeku Meere Maaku Meme (2016)	Malli Raava (2017)	Chandamama Raave (2017)
External audio
- Official Audio Jukebox on YouTube

The soundtrack was composed by Shravan Bharadwaj and became an instant hit, The lyrics were written by Krishnakanth. The audio was released on Madhura Audio.

Track list
No.	Title	Singer(s)	Length
1.	"Malli Raava"	Shravan Bharadwaj	3:06
2.	"Chinuku"	Karthik	3:26
3.	"Welcome Back To Love"	Hemachandra	3:01
4.	"Ennadu"	Saikrishna, Lalitha Kavya	3:05
5.	"Adugasale"	Kaala Bhairava	3:02
6.	"Chinuku (Reprise)"	Lalitha Kavya	2:30
7.	"Malli Raava (Reprise)"	Sunitha	2:30
8.	"Telisi"	Harini Ivaturi	1:48
Total length:			22:30

== Reception ==
=== Critical reception ===
The Times of India gave 3 out of 5 stars stating "Watch this one if you’ve ever been in love, especially if you know the bittersweet pain of falling in love for the first time". IndiaGlitz gave 3 out of 5 stars stating "A coming-of-age love story that caters to the tastes of multiplex audiences in good measure. If you like mature dramas that have an inkling of the ways of the human mind and life, you will love it! Look out for the neat performances and some stirring dialogues". Hemanth Kumar from Firstpost.com, who gave it 3.25/5, said, "for a film which doesn’t really have much to say or say anything differently, it’s a surprise that Malli Raava tugs your heartstrings in the end".

123Telugu.com gave it 3.25/5 and wrote "Malli Raava is a subtle love story which has some beautiful moments throughout." Sangeetha Devi Dundoo of The Hindu was a bit more critical and wrote, "If only Malli Raava had been more interesting, it wouldn't have ended up as a reminder of Yeto Vellipoyindhi Manasu which addressed issues of growing up, decisions and romance across decades more effectively". Great Andhra gave 2.75 out of 5 stars stating " Though this love story is not for all. Youngsters and guys with too-romantic a mind can enjoy it, but for others, this is not gripping enough".
