= Mundeyan Ton Bachke Rahin =

- Film poster
- Directed by: Navinder Kirpal Singh
- Written by: Pawan Gill, Navinder Kirpal Singh, Manoj Sabharwal
- Produced by: Pawan Gill, Aman Gill, Arun Mehra
- Starring: Roshan Prince; Jassi Gill; Simran Kaur Mundi; Sunny Gill; Bharti Singh
- Cinematography: John Wilmor
- Edited by: Parveen Kathikuloth
- Music by: Salil Amrute
- Production companies: Gill Pictures Entertainment and AUM Moviez
- Distributed by: White Hill Studios
- Release date: 30 May 2014
- Country: India
- Language: Punjabi

Mundeyan Ton Bachke Rahin (English: Beware of Boys) is a Punjabi romantic comedy film starring Roshan Prince, Jassi Gill, Simran Kaur Mundi, Sunny Gill, Bharti Singh and Anshu (Preeto) Sawhney.

== Plot ==
The film is a romance comedy about two best friends, Roshan Prince & Jassi Gill who got their hearts broken at the age of 13 in school. They vowed to never fall in love again but instead make girls fall in love with them and break their hearts. However, now, 10 years later, they both end up meeting the same girl Simran Kaur Mundi and compete to see who can make her fall in love with them. Whoever gets her wins their game but instead both of them fall madly in love with her and then everything changes.

== Cast ==
- Roshan Prince
- Jassi Gill
- Simran Kaur Mundi
- Sunny Gill
- Bharti Singh
- Harleen Sethi
- Anshu (Preeto) Sawhney
- Minto
- Hobby Dhaliwal
- Sunita Dhir
- Manoj Sabharwal

== Production ==
The title of the film is inspired by the Panjabi MC song Mundian To Bach Ke Rahi. Shooting for the film took place in November and December 2013 in Nalagarh and Chandigarh. The films trailer along with the first look posters were launched on April 15, 2014 at a first of its kind media event for a Punjabi film and the film released on 30 May 2014 receiving three star review ratings, the tribune said "the film has everything different on platter...and will be known for its unconventional climax, it's something unheard of or unseen in Punjabi films."

== Music ==
Mundeyan Ton Bachke Rahin

Soundtrack album by Jassi Katyal and Gurmeet Singh
- Genre: Feature film soundtrack
- Length: 23:32
- Label: Sony Music India

=== Track listing ===
No.	Title	Lyrics	Music	Singers(s)	Length
1.	"Dil Da Plot"	Kumaar	Jassi Katyal	Roshan Prince, Jassi Gill	3:19
2.	"Dil Roi Janda"	Kumaar	Jassi Katyal	Jassi Katyal	4:56
3.	"Mundeyan Ton Bachke Rahin"	Kumaar	Jassi Katyal	Roshan Prince, Jassi Gill	3:28
4.	"Ranno"	Kumaar	Jassi Katyal	Jassi Katyal, Shipra Goyal	3:49
5.	"Suraj"	Kumaar	Gurmeet Singh	Roshan Prince	3:47
6.	"Umb Leine"	Kumaar	Jassi Katyal	Roshan Prince, Jassi Gill	4:05
Total length:					23:32

== Awards ==
The film was nominated for 5 PTC Punjabi Film Awards 2015 and went on to win for Best Lyrics.

Nominated

- Best Actress - Simran Kaur Mundi
- Best Debut Director - Navinderpal Singh
- Best Music Director - Jassi Katyal / Gurmeet Singh
- Best Playback Singer (Male) - Roshan Prince for Suraj

Won

- Best Lyricist - Kumaar for Suraj
