= Mastering the Art of Solution-Focused Counseling =

2013 book by Jeffrey Guterman

- Author: Jeffrey Guterman
- Language: English
- Genre: Solution-focused counseling
- Publisher: American Counseling Association
- Publication date: 2006, 2013
- Publication place: United States
- Media type: Print (Paperback)
- ISBN: 1-55620-267-9 (first edition), ISBN 978-1-55620-332-9 (second edition)

Mastering the Art of Solution-Focused Counseling is a 2006 book by Jeffrey Guterman that describes the theory and practice of solution-focused counseling. The first edition of the book was published in 2006 by the American Counseling Association. An updated and expanded second edition of the book was published by the American Counseling Association in 2013.

== Reception ==
The Journal of Marital and Family Therapy reviewed Guterman's counseling model, stating that he "clearly demonstrates and stresses the adaptability of this model as well as its usefulness for the client and therapist."
