= Aditya Jassi =

Indian singer (born 1982)

Aditya Jassi (born 21 March 1982, New Delhi, India) is an Indian singer-songwriter, composer, record producer and musician.

== Biography ==
Aditya Jassi was born in New Delhi, India, and is the son of documentary film-makers and authors, Jaswin Jassi and Kiran Jassi. He initially studied in Air Force Bal Bharati School, at Lodi Road in Delhi and later went to a boarding school viz. "Welham Boys' School" at Dehradun. He is an English graduate from Delhi University, and pursued civil aviation, while teaching music in colleges alongside as a hobby. Despite holding a private pilot license from the Delhi Flying Club, he switched several jobs- from freelance print journalist to copywriter before completing his post-graduate studies in Mass Communication. Thereafter, he joined Sahara News Channel as a reporter, producer and anchor. He quit his job at Sahara in 2006, to pursue music professionally. Currently, he is a singer and musician and is the frontman of a live band called "The Unplugged Project".

== Career in music ==
In 2006, at the behest of his friend Dr. Palash Sen (Euphoria), Jassi auditioned for FAME-X, and made it to the top ten of this reality show contest aired on Sony and SAB TV "FAME X" on Sony starring Daler Mehndi, Palash Sen, Nikhil Chinappa/Rannvijay Singh/Cyrus Broacha).

Jassi featured in the Fame-X song Chal Udiye, featuring top ten finalists of the reality show.

He is also a playback singer, having ventured into Bollywood debuting with a song for the Jimmy Shergill and KK Menon starrer, "Strangers" in 2007, a song for "Dil Kabaddi" starring Irfan Khan, Konkona Sen in 2014.

Jassi's current live band is "The Unplugged Project". The Unplugged Project released their first original "Faasle" in the year 2019. Aditya is currently working on another album along with playing a plethora of live gigs across the world.

In 2020 Jassi became one of two official Indian endorsers of Fender Acoustasonic guitars in India. For Jassi this was a dream come true. He said the experience was amazing and almost unreal. He explained that Fender is a name in the guitar world. He said that playing one is a dream, for musicians. After this achievement he admitted that it had not fully sunk in.

== Film career ==
After FAME-X, Aditya ventured into Bollywood, debuting with the song "Yaad Aaye Who Din" for the Jimmy Shergill-KK Menon starrer Strangers, released in 2007. He launched his band Ni9Ne with music producer and guitar player Sachin Gupta.

Jassi sang "Uthale Ya Phenk De" in "Dil Kabbadi" movie. He also sang "Tension Lene Ka Nahi" in year 2009 for "Jugaad" movie.

== Seven/7 ==
The debut album 7 was released in 2013 via Universal Music India. the song of the week on iTunes. The album was co-produced by Vinayak Gupta and mixed by Vijay Dayal at Yash Raj Studios.
