= Simran Kaur Mundi =

Indian model and actress

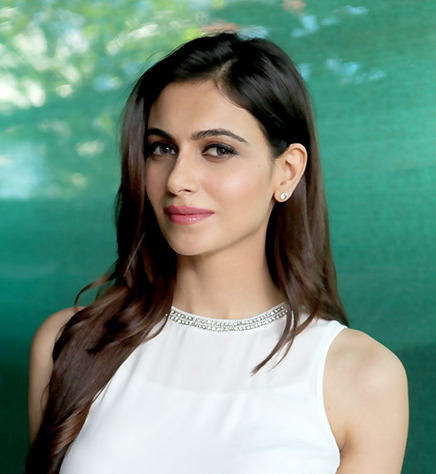
- Mundi in 2016
- Born: Mumbai, Maharashtra, India
- Occupations: Actress; model
- Height: 170 cm (5 ft 7 in)
- Spouse: Gurickk Maan (m. 2020)
- Beauty pageant titleholder
- Major competitions: Femina Miss India 2008 (Winner); Miss Universe 2008 (Unplaced)

Simran Kaur Mundi is an Indian actress, model and beauty pageant titleholder. She works in Hindi films. She won the title of Femina Miss India Universe 2008 and represented India at Miss Universe 2008. She made her acting debut in the Hindi film Jo Hum Chahein in 2011.

== Early life ==
Born in Mumbai, she belongs to a Jat family from Mundian Jattan, Hoshiarpur, Punjab, India. She studied for two years in Delhi Public School, Vijaipur, Guna Madhya Pradesh and later completed her schooling from the boarding school Scindia Kanya Vidyalaya, Gwalior, Madhya Pradesh. She completed her Bio-Technology degree from the Holkar Science College, Indore in 2007. After her graduation she moved to Mumbai and worked with Fame Cinemas in Andheri – as a guest relations executive, where she exclusively managed bookings for professionals from the film and media industry.

== Modelling and pageantry ==
=== Femina Miss India 2008 ===
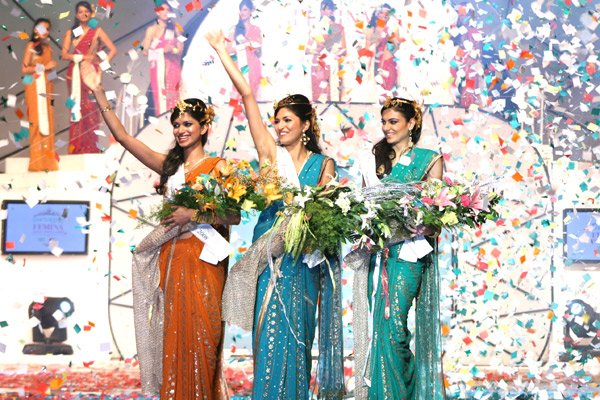
(from left to right) Harshita Saxena (Dethroned-Femina Miss India Earth 2008), Parvathy Omanakuttan (Femina Miss India World 2008) and Mundi (Femina Miss India Universe 2008)

While working at Fame Cinemas she was noticed by Bharat and Dorris, one of the top make up artists in show business who encouraged her to participate in the Femina Miss India 2008 pageant. Even without having any formal modelling experience under her belt, she still went on to compete with the country's best and win the title, she was crowned Femina Miss India Universe in 2008. She then went on to represent India at the Miss Universe 2008 pageant held at the Diamond Bay Resort in Nha Trang, Vietnam on 13 July 2008, where she placed first runner-up in the Beach Beauty Competition, second runner-up in the Evening Gown Contest and fourth in the National Costume Round.

She was crowned Femina Miss India Universe 2008 by the outgoing titleholder Puja Gupta.

=== Miss Universe 2008 ===
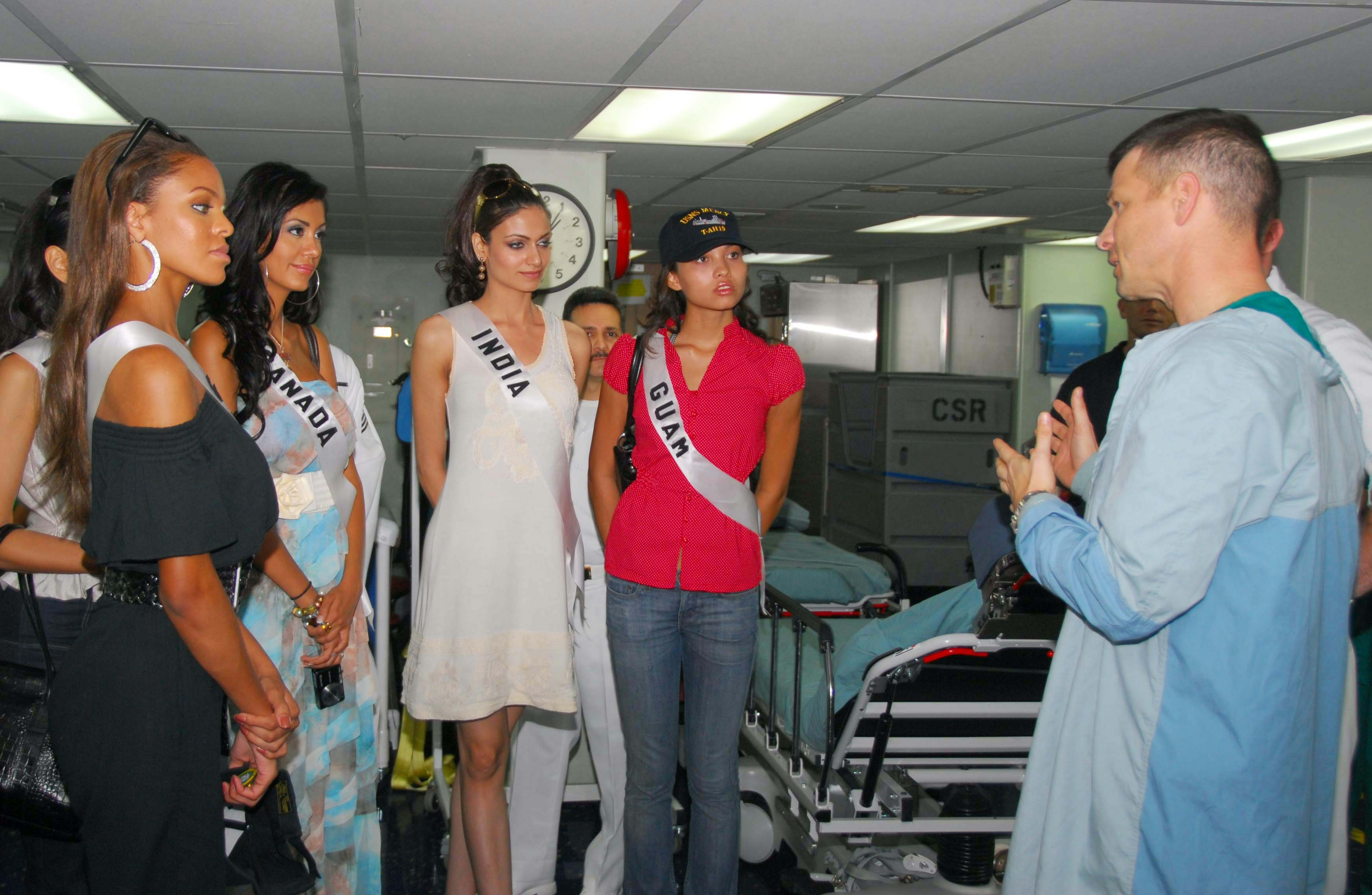
Mundi and other Miss Universe contestants at USNS Mercy during Miss Universe 2008

She represented India at Miss Universe 2008 held in Vietnam and placed in various preliminary events, she was one of the top five finalists at the Best in Swimsuit round, placed in the top 5 of Charming Ao-dai round and was the group winner at the national costume award.

=== After Miss Universe 2008 ===
After winning the Femina Miss India Universe title in 2008, she started modelling professionally. She modeled at the Lakme India Fashion Weeks 2008–2011, Wills India Fashion Weeks 2010, 2011, India Couture Weeks 2008–2010, Dubai Fashion Week, NIFD, NIFT and many others. She also walked the red carpet for the film Outrage at the Cannes film festival in 2010 and also walked the ramp at the Cannes Fashion Paranoia 2010.

She was one of the judges at Femina Miss India Delhi 2013, Femina Miss India Chandigarh 2013 and Elite Model Look India 2014.

She had also done a few commercials where she endorsed Parachute 'Hot Oil' in 2008, apart from doing various other print and commercial campaigns. She worked in a music video for renowned Punjabi music composer and singer Sukshinder Shinda titled "La la la la" from the album Jadoo released on 2 December 2010.

== Acting career ==
Mundi made her acting debut in Bollywood with the film Jo Hum Chahein on 16 December 2011 opposite newcomer Sunny Gill which released to a lukewarm response at the box office but she received positive appreciation for her performance. In July 2013 she made her Punjabi Film debut opposite Punjabi superstar Gippy Grewal and Punjabi musical legend Jazzy Bains in the film Best of Luck, which had the third highest opening day (Rs 7.1 million) and weekend (Rs 22.4 million) for a Punjabi film at the time of release and went on to create a spot amongst the top grossing Punjabi films. In September 2013, Mundi made her debut in Tollywood with the film Potugadu, opposite Telugu movie star Manoj Manchu which took a blockbuster opening on release.

Mundi in 2014

Mundi's next Hindi film Kuku Mathur Ki Jhand Ho Gayi was produced by Ekta Kapoor's Balaji Motion Pictures and Bejoy Nambiar released on the same day as her Punjabi film Mundeyan Ton Bachke Rahin on 30 May 2014 and she had to juggle the promotions of both films at the same time. She was next seen on screen opposite comedian Kapil Sharma, who made his acting debut in the film Kis Kisko Pyaar Karoon, directed by Abbas–Mustan. The film was a commercial success as declared by Box Office India.

In January 2011, she was seen on Indian Television in the reality game show Zor Ka Jhatka: Total Wipeout, anchored by Shah Rukh Khan. She won the seventh episode and found her place among the 15 finalists in the final episode. In January 2013, Mundi made her debut as a host for the first ever Hockey India League, where she anchored matches played all across the country for over a month. In 2019 she co-hosted Saturday Morning Live Show along with Rannvijay Singh and Manas Singh where they discussed Basketball matches played in the NBA aired on Sony Pictures Networks India. She anchored the first ever NBA India Games 2019 along with Scott Fresh, which featured Sacramento Kings and Indiana Pacers at the Dome, NSCI, SVP Stadium on 4 and 5 October 2019.

== Personal life ==
Mundi married Gurickk Maan, son of Punjabi singer and actor Gurdas Maan, on 31 January 2020 in Patiala.The couple had a baby boy on 24 February 2024.

== Filmography ==
=== Films ===
Year	Title	Role	Language	Notes
2011	Jo Hum Chahein	Neha Kapoor	Hindi	Hindi Debut
2013	Best of Luck	Preet	Punjabi	Punjabi Debut
2013	Potugadu	Vaidehi	Telugu	Telugu Debut
2014	Kuku Mathur Ki Jhand Ho Gayi	Mitali	Hindi	
2014	Mundeyan Ton Bachke Rahin	Simran	Punjabi	Nominated for Best Actress at PTC Punjabi Film Awards
2015	Kis Kisko Pyaar Karoon	Simran Shiv Punj	Hindi	
2017	U, Me Aur Ghar	Chitranshi Mazumdar	Hindi	
2021	Step In My Shoes	Richa	Hindi	Short film released on Hotstar

=== Music video appearances ===
Year	Title	Singer	Label
2017	"Nachan To Pehla"	Yuvraj Hans	Speed Records

=== Web series ===
Year	Title	Role	Notes
2018	Broken But Beautiful	Ananya	Special appearance
2018	Bar Code	Rhea Malhotra	
2020	It Happened In Calcutta	Sujatha	Special appearance
2021	Chakravyuh – An Inspector Virkar Crime Thriller	Naina	

== Awards and nominations ==
Year	Award	Category	Film	Result	Ref.
2015	PTC Punjabi Film Awards	Best Actress	Mundeyan Ton Bachke Rahin	Nominated	

== See also ==
- List of Indian film actresses

Preceded by Puja Gupta	Miss India Universe; 2008	Succeeded by Ekta Chowdhry
