= Jo Hum Chahein =

- Theatrical release poster
- Directed by: Pawan Gill
- Produced by: Aman Gill
- Starring: Sunny Gill; Simran Mundi; Alyy Khan; Achint Kaur; Yuri Suri; Rithvik Dhanjani
- Cinematography: Manush Nandan
- Edited by: Bakul Matiyani
- Music by: Sachin Gupta; Kumaar
- Production company: Alvi Production
- Release date: 16 December 2011
- Running time: 134 minutes
- Country: India
- Language: Hindi

Jo Hum Chahein (transl. What we wish for) is a 2011 Hindi romance film directed by Pawan Gill, starring Sunny Gill, Simran Mundi, Alyy Khan and Achint Kaur. It is a debut film for both the lead actors and the director. The film was released on 16 December 2011 to a mixed response. The official DVD of the film was released on 18 January 2012.

== Plot ==
Rohan Bhatia (Sunny Gill), a fresh MBA graduate, has a clash of ideologies with his father Dalip Bhatia (Yuri Suri) on what career he should pursue. Rohan has set his eyes on being a stockbroker in Mumbai because that's the quickest way to make big money. He goes to Mumbai with his best friend Abhay (Samar Virmani), a fellow MBA graduate, and on their first night out he meets Neha Kapoor (Simran Mundi) and the two have a war of words; for the first time in his life his advances have been rejected by a girl. Rohan, Abhay and 28 new stockbrokers start work at Bombay Bulls but after three months only the 10 best will survive and get permanent placements. Rohan pitches clients but doesn't climb the charts; he remains near the bottom, so he uses the help of Vikram Khurrana (Alyy Khan), the firm's best stockbroker, to climb the charts faster. Vikram introduces Rohan to Amrita Singhania (Achint Kaur), a wealthy society lady who is instantly taken by Rohan's boyish charm; the same night he also bumps into Neha and this time he doesn't budge until she agrees to go on a date with him. The next day, Amrita invites Rohan to a beach party where she tries to seduce him with her sultry body.

Rohan takes Neha to a spiritual date and courts her further until she completely falls in love with him. At the same time he pursues Amrita, who agrees to let him make trades for her and upon making her a large profit she invites him to celebrate in Goa. The same weekend is Rohan's 25th birthday and Neha comes to Goa to surprise him, but finds him in bed with Amrita. Rohan can't remember what happened, he was too drunk; heartbroken Neha storms away. In Mumbai, Rohan makes two more attempts to apologize but Neha won't give him another chance. The distance between them grows. He also has a showdown with Dalip and Abhay. Rohan gets more entwined into Amrita and Vikram's worlds but misses and longs for Neha. At Neha's best friend Shivangi's (Mansi Multani) engagement to Abhay, Rohan publicly begs Neha for forgiveness; she tells him she's pregnant but doesn't need him in her life. Rohan discovers Amrita and Vikram were just using him for their selfish plans; he has a showdown with Amrita and Vikram and gets thrown out of the firm. Rohan apologizes to his father for all his wrongdoings, then goes to Neha's house in Delhi to ask to be a part of their child's life only to discover that she's aborted their child. She wasn't ready for a child and was only having it to hurt him by keeping their child away from him. Rohan is shattered; Neha apologizes and asks him back in her life. Heartbroken, they embrace and accept each other for their flaws.

== Cast ==
- Sunny Gill as Rohan Bhatia
- Simran Mundi as Neha Kapoor
- Alyy Khan as Vikram Khuranna
- Achint Kaur as Amrita Singhania
- Yuri Suri as Dalip Bhatia
- Samar Virmani as Abhay
- Mansi Multani as Shivangi
- Rithvik Dhanjani as Aakash

== Production ==
This is a debut film for actors Sunny Gill and Simran Mundi, a debut for Producer Aman Gill, who was an executive producer on Sanjay Leela Bhansali's Black and was the head of domestic distribution at Viacom 18 Motion Pictures where he distributed films like Ghajini, Singh Is Kinng, Golmaal Returns, Welcome, Jab We Met, a debut for director Pawan Gill, who was an assistant director at Yash Raj Films, the Hindi language debut for DOP Manush Nandan, and debut film as an editor for Bakul Matiyani. The film had production design by Amrita Mahal and Sabrina Singh, music and background score by Sachin Gupta, lyrics by Kumaar, sound design by Nimesh Chheda, costume by Priyanjali Lahiri, choreography by Adil Shaikh, dialogues by Rashmi Kulkarni and casting by Amita Sehgal. The film was shot from May to October 2011 in Pune, Goa, Mumbai and Ladakh.

== Reception ==
The film received an average response from critics. Taran Adarsh of Bollywood Hungama gave the film 2.5 stars, Rajeev Masand of CNN-IBN gave the film 2 stars, Nikhat Kazmi and Gaurav Malani of The Times of India also gave it 2 stars.

== Soundtrack ==
The music is composed by Sachin Gupta and lyrics are by Kumaar. The album has five tracks, "Aaj Bhi Party" is a young party song, "Ishq Hothon Se" is a quintessential love ballad, "Peepni" is a night club song, "Abhi Abhi Dil Toota Hai" is a sad song and "One More One More" is a fun filled Punjabi engagement song. The music was released by T-Series and received favorable reviews by most critics. Glamsham gave it 3.5 stars, and Bollywood Hungama gave it 3 stars.

=== Track listing ===
No.	Title	Lyrics	Music	Singer(s)	Length
1.	"Aaj Bhi Party"	Kumaar	Sachin Gupta	Suraj Jagan	3:45
2.	"Ishq Hothon Se"	Kumaar	Sachin Gupta	KK, Shreya Ghoshal	5:05
3.	"Peepni"	Kumaar	Sachin Gupta	Jaspreet Singh, Monali Thakur	3:40
4.	"Abhi Abhi Dil Toota Hai"	Kumaar	Sachin Gupta	KK, Shashaa Tirupati	4:40
5.	"One More One More"	Kumaar	Sachin Gupta	Neeraj Shridhar, Sunidhi Chauhan	3:50
