= Kashmiri cinema =

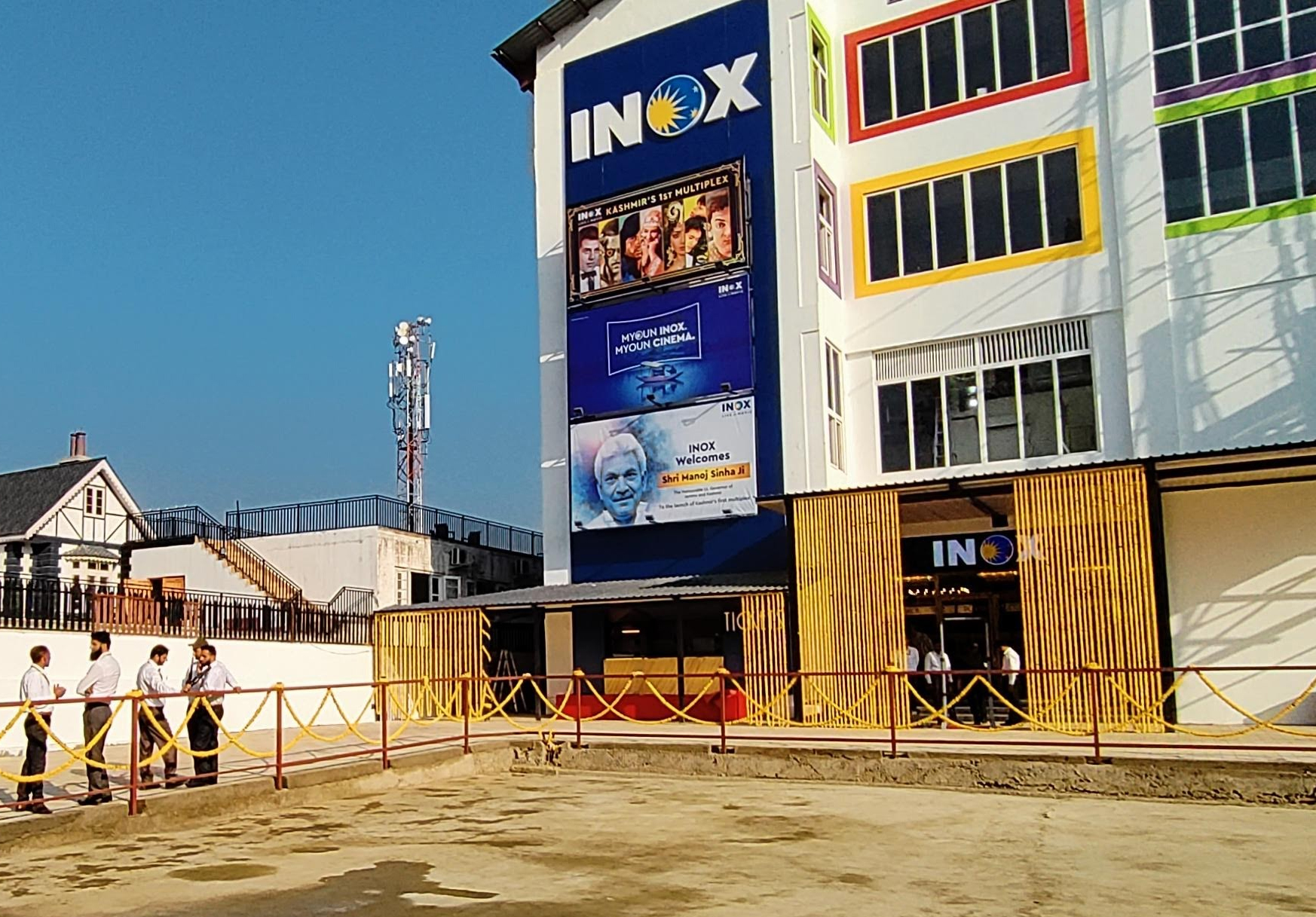
Inox Multiplex Srinagar

Kashmiri cinema is the Kashmiri language-based film industry in the Kashmir Valley of the India,- administered union territory of Jammu and Kashmir. The first Kashmiri feature film, Mainz Raat, was released in 1964. In 2023, Welcome to Kashmir, directed by Tariq Bhat, became the first Kashmiri-produced Bollywood film to release in Kashmiri cinemas.

== Kashmiri artists ==
Kashmir is a shooting destination for Bollywood films, and Kashmiri actors are well known in Bollywood. Some famous Kashmiri artists in films and television are:

- Raaj Kumar
- Zain Khan Durrani
- Abrar Qazi
- Sadia Khateeb
- Jeevan
- Kiran Kumar
- Sanjay Suri
- RJ Rafiq
- Rahul Bhat
- Hina Khan
- Ayesha Jhulka, actress born in Srinagar
- Sandeepa Dhar, actress born in Srinagar
- Arjumman Mughal, actress from Nowshera, Jammu and Kashmir
- Zaira Wasim, actress born in Srinagar
- Katrina Kaif
- Danish Renzu
- Sunayana Kachroo
- Aamir Bashir
- Mir Sarwar
- Anupam Kher
- Vidhu Vinod Chopra, Director
- Hussein Khan, Director, Actor
- Tariq Bhat, Director Welcome to Kashmir

== 1960s to 1980s ==
The first Kashmiri feature film (Mainz Raat, directed by Jagjiram Pal) was released in 1964. In 1972, Shayar-e-Kashmir Mahjoor, a biography of Kashmiri poet Mahjoor, was released. Made in Urdu and Kashmiri, the film was a joint venture of the Department of Information of Jammu and Kashmir and Indian filmmaker Prabhat Mukherjee. Babaji (directed by Jyoti Sarup) followed for 39 years, but it was not screened in Kashmir. A 1989 film, Inqalaab, was not released due to the turbulent political situation at the time. Because of the 1989 insurgency, film production in Kashmir was halted, and an unofficial screening ban was imposed on Bollywood films.

== Cinema closures ==
Before the eruption of militancy in the 1990s, Srinagar alone had about 10 cinema halls: Firdaus, Shiraz, Khayam, Naaz, Neelam, Shah, Broadway, Regal, and Palladium. Cinemas in Kashmir, including nine in Srinagar, were closed due to the 1989 insurgency. In 1996, due to efforts by the National Conference government, the Broadway, Regal, and Neelam Cinemas showed Vidhu Vinod Chopra's Kareeb. After further attacks, cinemas in Kashmir were closed, and DVD film piracy flourished. Director Tariq Bhat worked hard to push cinema culture in Kashmir by organising movie screenings of his 2019 directorial debut film Zindagi Tumse followed by Welcome to Kashmir, the first Kashmiri-produced Bollywood film. In September 2022, a multiplex was opened in Srinagar.

== Television ==
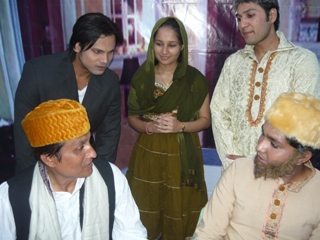
Publicity photo of Kazi Mushtaque Ahmed's play, Aatish-e-Kashmir

Three television films have been produced in Kashmir: Rasool Mir (1974–75), directed by Bashir Badgami; Habba Khatoon (1977-1978), directed by Bashir Badgami; and Arnimaal (1982–83), directed by Siraj Qureshi.

== Documentaries ==
The first Kashmiri film shown at the Cannes Film Festival was Ezra Mir's 1952 documentary, Pamposh (Lotus). Inshallah, Kashmir is a 2012 documentary directed, produced, and written by Ashvin Kumar. Other notable documentaries are Papa 2 (2000) and Ocean of Tears (2012). In 2017, a documentary on the Pragaash Kashmiri girls band with a focus on Women's rights in Jammu and Kashmir was released.

== 21st century ==
Several films were made after 2000. However, only a few of them had a proper release in theaters/cinema halls through proper distribution. Harud, Kashmir Daily, and Half Widow are the only films in this list and were released on the platform of PVR. Harud was made under A Chasing Tales Production, starring Raza Naji and Kashmir Daily under Seven Two Creations and Safdar Arts and Half Widow under Renzu Films and Gaya Arts.

Aamir Bashir, Hussein Khan and Danish Renzu have directed them respectively.

Akh Daleel Loolech (Love Story) starring Mir Sarwar, it was the first Kashmiri digital feature film, premiered in India in 2006. Directed by Aarshad Mushtaq, the historical drama explored the Kashmiri people's social and political struggles during the 19th century. In 2012, Kashmir's first 35mm feature film Partav directed by Dilnawaz Muntazir was released. This movie, Valley of Saints, a romantic drama set near Dal Lake in Srinagar and directed by Musa Syeed, addressed environmental issues surrounding the lake. Qouluf, the ensorcelled 2014 was a Kashmiri language film that was screened in many film festivals, the film had Bashir Dada in the lead role, the film was directed by Ali Emran and produced by Yaqut Mushtaq, the film tries to follow the internal and the external journey of the protagonist.

Kashmir Daily, Mir Sarwar played the leading character in this film, he has also done several Bollywood films as well. Kashmir Daily is filmed in Hindi and Kashmiri and produced and directed by Hussein Khan, was scheduled for release in spring 2016 but ultimately released on 6 January 2018. Among few films which are ready is Bed No. 17 which is directed by Mir Sarwar and should release by the end of 2020

In 2024, Saffron Kingdom was announced, being released on streaming services in 2026. Directed by Arfat Sheikh, the film explores themes related to the Kashmir conflict and the Kashmiri diaspora and has positioned itself as challenging Indian narratives about Kashmir. The film was shot primarily in Atlanta, Georgia with some shots taken in Kashmir. While directed and produced by Kashmiris, the cast was made up entirely of non-Kashmiris due to safety concerns.

== Revival efforts ==
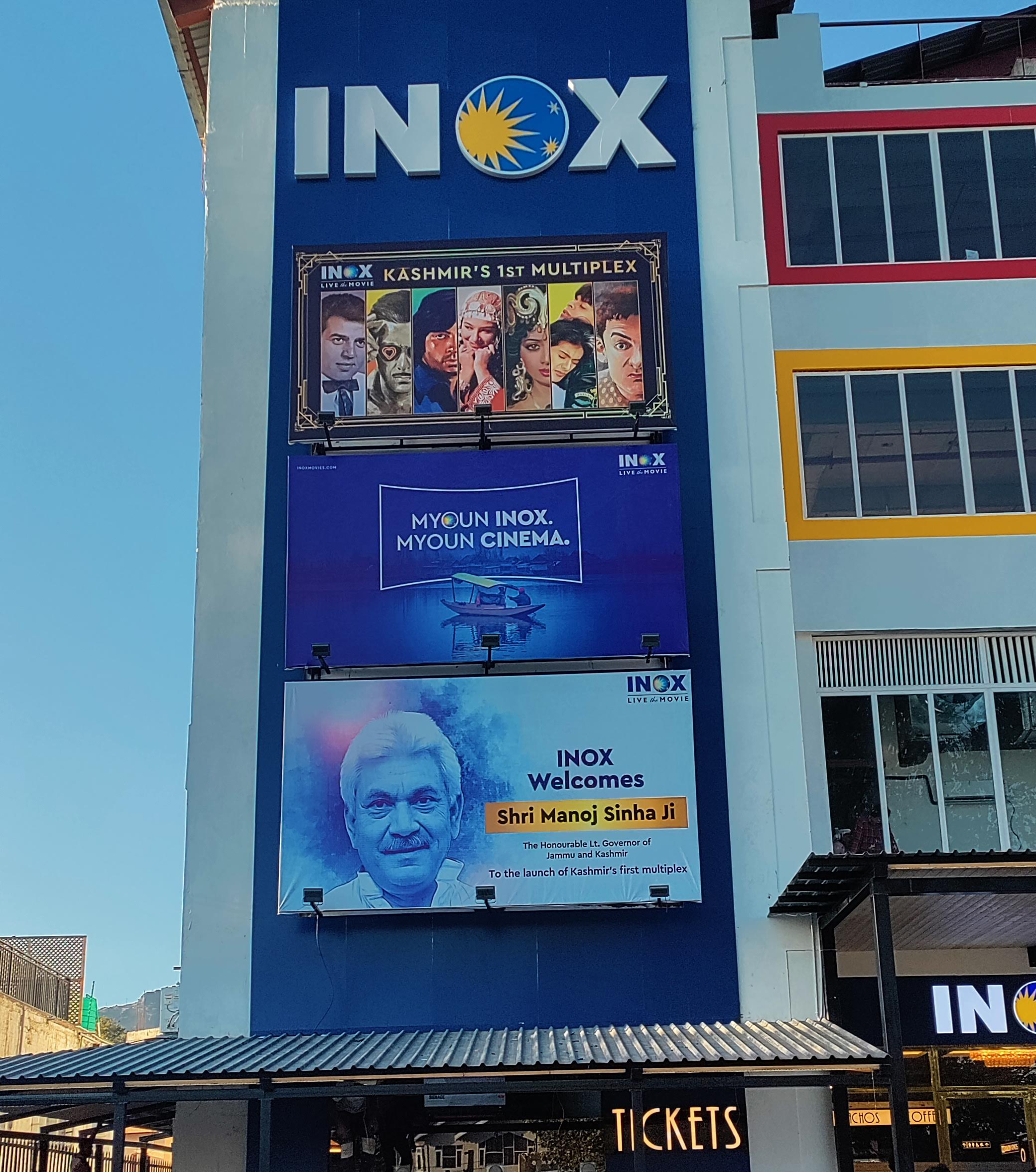
Inox Cinema Sonwar Srinagar.

Obstacles to reviving the Kashmiri film industry are the lack of financial and government support. However, some people are making independent films few examples are Harud, Kashmir Daily and Half Widow and these three films are the only ones so far which have released. In 2014 Kashmiri filmmaker Ali Emran decided to shoot a film in Kashmir based on The Fountainhead. Emran's Kashmiri-language feature film Qouluf, which translates into "the ensorcelled", became the first Kashmiri film in decades to have a commercial release in the valley. Identity Card- Ek Lifeline (2014) by Kashmiri filmmaker Rahat Kazmi received three awards at the American International Film Festival. In November 2014, the film was released worldwide. According to the Prime Minister of India, reviving the Kashmiri film industry would provide jobs for Kashmiri youth. In May 2015, Salman Khan said during the filming of Bajrangi Bhaijaan which had some actors from Kashmir like Mir Sarwar, Bashir Bhawani etc. that Kashmiri cinemas should be re-opened. Imtiaz Ali praised the state government for encouraging filmmakers in the valley after Chief Minister Mufti Mohammad Sayeed visited Mumbai to meet with Bollywood industry figures.

Inox Gold Class, a three-screen multiplex is situated adjacent to Srinagar's famous cinema hall of yesteryears called the Broadway cinema. This is the first multiplex in Kashmir and has been built by M/s Taksal Hospitality Pvt Ltd company in Shivpora in the Badami Bagh cantonment area of Srinagar which is owned by Vijay Dhar. It is here to mention that Mr. Dhar also runs Delhi Public School, Srinagar. The Inox Gold Multiplex was inaugurated by LG Manoj Sinha on 20 September 2022, later after the function the first film screened here to the journalists and selected audience was Laal Singh Chaddha. The cinema was thrown open for general public on 30 September, the films released were Vikram Vedha and Ponniyin Selvan:I.

Jadooz, the Chennai-based startup company which sets up mini theatres in rural pockets of India opened two mini theatres in Pulwama and Shopian in 2022. In 2023, Jadooz opened cinema halls in Handwara and Baramulla, with plans to open 3 more cinema halls in Bandipora, Ganderbal, and Kulgam in September 2023.

== Cinemas in Kashmir Valley ==
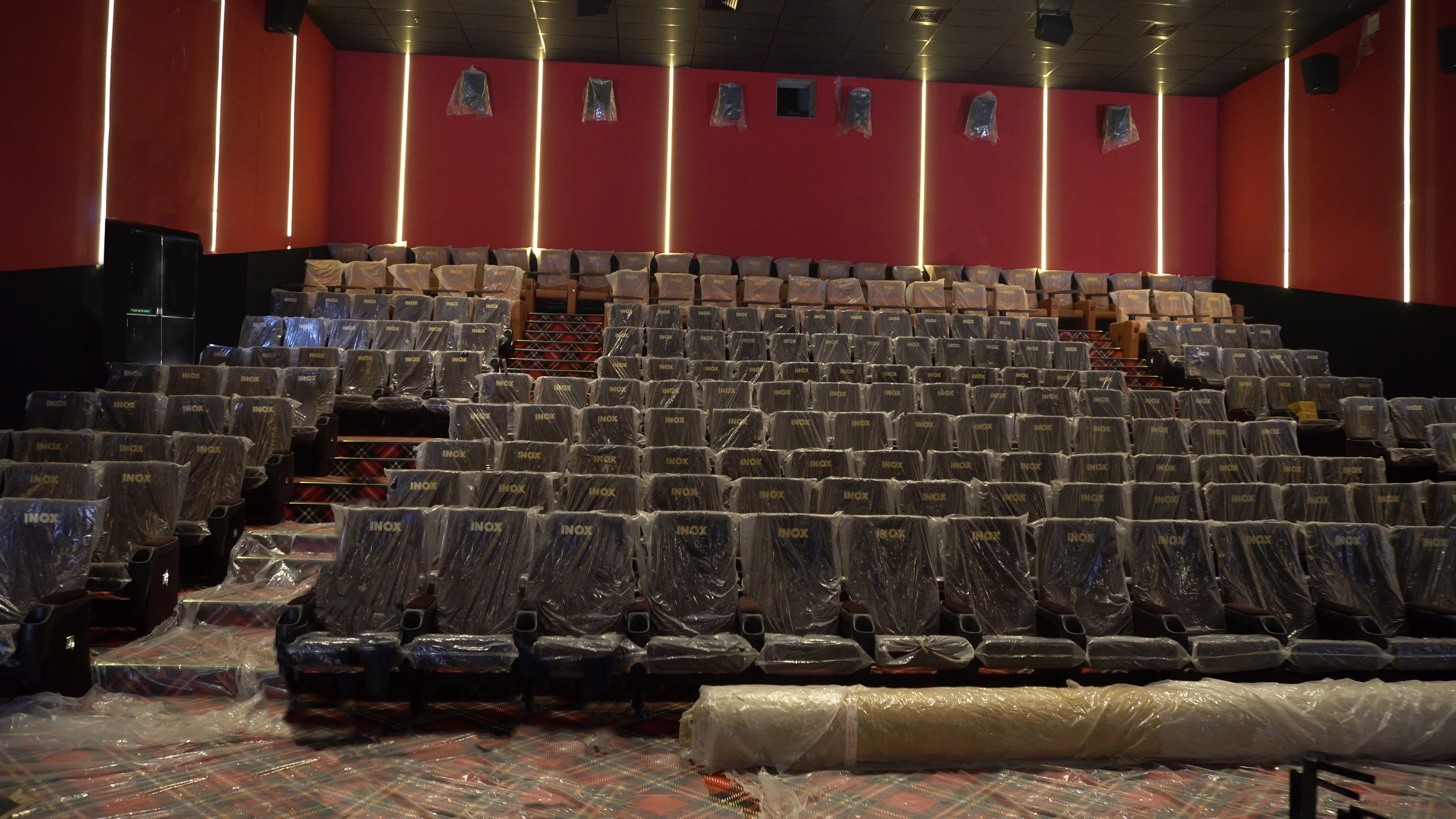
One of the three halls of INOX Multiplex Srinagar. The cinema opened for general people in September 2022.

Kashmir currently only has one multiplex cinema:

- INOX Multiplex Cinemas, Sonwar Srinagar.

Several other multipurpose cinema halls exist in Kashmir:

- Jadooz Cinema: Shopian at Townhall Municipal Council Office, Shopian
- Jadooz Cinema: Baramulla at Sherwani Hall, 684W+2M8, National Highway 1A, Near Axis Bank, Baramulla.
- Jadooz Cinema: Handwara at Municipal Committee Handwara, Maqbool Abad Khanabal B, Near Chinar Park, Handwara

== Cinemas in Jammu Region ==
Jammu has several multiplexes and cinema halls:

- MovieTime Cinemas in Palm Island Mall, Jammu.
- PVR Cinemas, KC Jammu.
- Wave Cinemas, Jammu.
- Apsara Multiplex, Jammu
- AMR Multiplex, Katra
- Moonlight Cineplex, Kathua
- Raj Theatre, Udhampur

== Kashmir film festivals ==
- Kashmir World Film Festival (KWFF) is annual seven day Film festival held at Srinagar.
- Verite Film Festival (Kashmir) is held at Awantipora.

== See also ==
- Music of Kashmir
- Kashmiri literature
- Kus Bani Koshur Karorpaet
- Sheen (film)
- Dogri cinema
