= Tasveer =

Seattle non-profit organization

- Founded: 2002; 24 years ago
- Founded by: Rita Meher and Farah Nousheen
- Most recent: Oct 13-18, 2026
- Website: https://tasveer.org https://filmcenter.tasveer.org

Tasveer is a Seattle-based South Asian social justice arts non-profit organization. It was founded by Rita Meher and Farah Nousheen in 2002.

Tasveer organizes events including film festivals, community speaking events, and open-mic nights to celebrate the voices of South Asian people through art and film. The organization includes voices of South Asian countries like Afghanistan, Bangladesh, Bhutan, India, Maldives, Nepal, Pakistan, Sri Lanka, and their diasporas worldwide.

The organization also hosts Tasveer TV, an online streaming platform that curates South Asian independent films. Annual events include the Tasveer South Asian Film Festival and the Tasveer South Asian Literary Festival. During the pandemic, in 2020, multiple South Asian festivals were thinking about cancelling the events in US and Canada. However, Tasveer brought them together to host a bigger online global South Asian Film Festival under the name Coalition of South Asian Film Festivals (CoSAFF). In 2021, Tasveer merged its film festival and literary festival into one, known as Tasveer Festival.

Tasveer's mission is “To inspire social change through thought-provoking South Asian films, art, and storytelling”.

== History ==
Tasveer was founded in 2002 in Seattle, US, shortly after the 9/11 event. It was founded by Rita Meher and Farah Nousheen who were tired of the hate and prejudice because of their South Asian identity and wanted to recast the harmful labels by providing a glimpse into the lives of South Asians through film, art, and storytelling. The word 'Tasveer' means ‘picture’ in Hindi and Urdu.

The organization hosted their first screening at The Elliot Bay Book Company in 2002 and the Tasveer South Asian Film Festival was launched in 2004.

== Tasveer South Asian Film Festival 13th Edition (2018) ==
The 13th edition of Tasveer's Film festival had Pakistan as the country of focus and invited Sharmeen Obaid-Chinoy as a guest. Some of the films included A Girl in the River: The Price of Forgiveness, Look But With Love, Sarmad Masud’s My Pure Land, and Ali Osman Bajwa’s Gorakh Dhandh. The festival had the theme #knowMe and had Laila Kazmi as the program director.

== Tasveer South Asian Film Festival 14th Edition (2019) ==
In 2019, Tasveer curated more than 60 films in all genres with a focus on LGBTQ issues and women's rights Some of the films included The Illegal, The Price of Free, A Monsoon Date, fest centerpiece, and The Sweet Requiem. The festival awarded Shabana Azmi with Tasveer Emerald Award and had Director Danish Renzu (In Search of America) and star Suraj Shama (Life of Pi) for a question-answer discussion with the audience.

== CoSAFF 2020 ==
There was no individual 15th edition of the festival in 2020. This year Tasveer merge with other festivals like the Vancouver fests; Mosaic International Festival in Toronto; Nepal America fest in Maryland; and the South Asian Film Festival of Montreal to create an online South Asian Film Festival called CoSAFF. The Tasveer Film Fund, which awarded grants to south Asian filmmakers in the US, was started in the year 2020.

== 2020 onwards ==
Tasveer continued to hold virtual events and screenings during Covid. They returned to holding live events in November 2022 with the 17th annual South Asian film festival. Screenings included The Round Lake, Elizabeth D. Costa's Bangla Surf Girls and Faraz Ali's Shoebox.

The Tasveer Film Fund Shorts Films track also works with Netflix as part of its Fund for Creative Equity initiative, to increase support for South Asian filmmakers developing short film projects, with up to $35,000 awarded in grants.

Rita Meher, managing Tasveer since 2007, continues to be Tasveer's Executive Director in Seattle. Farah Nousheen continues to be an active ally from Albuquerque, New Mexico, where she now lives with her family.
