= Verite Film Festival (Kashmir) =

Indian film festival

- Inaugurated: 2011

Verite Film Festival is an annual film festival of Kashmiri cinema held in Awantipora, Jammu and Kashmir, India.

== History ==
Its first edition (2011) was organized by Parallel Post in collaboration with Islamic University of Science & Technology (IUST), Awantipora and was held annually thereafter. It was the first National Students Film festival in Kashmir. The festival is aimed to explore the budding talent among the students in the field of film making. Twenty-two films were screened in the first edition of the film festival dealing with various ‘hard-hitting and pressing issues’ such as livelihood issues, loss of tradition and heritage, conflict and its various facets of presentation, drug abuse etc.

== Aim of the festival ==
The objective of organizing this Film festival is to groom the potential of the young documentary film makers across the country and particularly from the Kashmir valley. Moreover, the festival will provide a launch pad for Kashmiri discourse whereby the upcoming student film makers will meet and interact with the established film makers and students throughout the country.

== 2011 ==
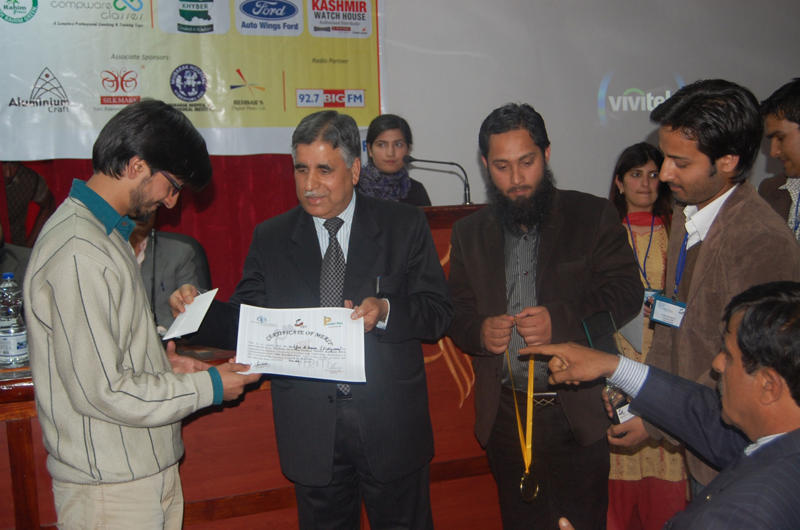
A participant receives an award during the festival's prize distribution ceremony, held on 20 April 2011 at IUST.

In this year 22 films directed by young artists were screened dealing with various ‘hard-hitting and pressing issues’. Most of the films screened in the festival were about the Kashmir conflict and its various facets of presentation, livelihood issues, loss of tradition and heritage, drug abuse etc.

A short animated movie ‘Hopscotch’ by cartoonist Malik Sajad revealed the story of divided Kashmir. Another documentary 'Patience on trial' by Naureen Farooq revolved around the wishes, hopes and needs of orphans.

The film In Limbo, Kashmiris Half-widows, a film by human rights lawyer Lebul Nissa, followed the "half-widows" of Kashmir, women whose husbands have disappeared in the context of the Kashmir conflict.

The event was first of its kinds and was praised by many dignitaries present at the festival. Noted poet Poet Zareef Ahmed Zareef expressed joy and said there is a dire need of noble teachers who will lead budding talent into the right direction. "The way they presented the various aspects of Kashmir is admirable. God has gifted Kashmir with the best talent. The day will definitely come when we will produce the better film makers to show the true story of our Land".

=== Awards ===
In total, 22 films were screened. Life on Wheels by Adil Shah won the award for the best film. Pankh by Nishant was adjudged the second prize winner and the third prize was given to three films - Lost by Ather Mohiuddin, Hopskotch by Malik Sajjad, and Eidiyaan by Muhammad Irfan Dar and Aman Kaleem.

=== Films Screened ===
Film	Director	Duration	Details	Awards
Behind the Darkness	Akif Mufti	30 min.	Explores the Islamic world in the Middle Ages, when there was tremendous intellectual activity	
The Ninth Act (special screening)	Ali Emraann Kureshi	25 min.	Experiment	
Pandiths	Mehak Fayaz	16 min.	Follows Kashmiri pundits who did not leave Kashmir after militancy started in 1989. The documentary tries to look into the various aspects of their life in Kashmir, which unlike the migrant is mostly unreported.	
Sailing Through generations	Benish Ali Bhat	15 min.	Documents the lives of shikarawalas and life in the ake city.	
Dal Lake	Turfat ul ain	6 min	About Dal Lake.	
Stairs of Faith	Jamshed Rasul and Team.	7 min.	Depicts the faith of Kashmirs in the Shrine of Sheikh Hamza Makhdoom popularly known in Kashmir as Makhdoom Sahab(R.A).	
Charare Sharief	-	7 min.	Travelogue	
Dreams of Despair	Nayeem Raja	5 min.	-	
I love you maa	Harris Zargar	6 min.	About crèche going children.	
Life on Wheels (Best Film)	Adil shah	9 min.	Follows the life of a bus conductor.	
Lost- The unending Search	Athar Mohi-ud-din	24 min.	Documents the misery of families whose relatives were disappeared in the Kashmir conflict.	Tied for 3rd
Drug De-addiction	Nayeem Khan	9 min.	Focuses on the rehabilitation of drug addicts.	
Hopscotch	Malik Sajad	2 min.	Animated short	Tied for 3rd
Half widows	Leb ul Nisa	2 min.	Discusses women in Kashmir.	
Pankh (2nd Prize winner)	Nishant Rana	6 min.	Q-What makes a man fly? Ans.- A dream	
Raaga	Chirag Thakkar	6 min.	A spiritual commentary on the essence of life. Follows a man in his thirties and a stranger who helps him move on.	
Zadah	Sushant. H. W.	13 min.	Docu-fiction, Zadah -A socio-political love story. An attempt to understand and explain the prolonged and complex issue of the state of Kashmir personified as a woman oppressed between two patriarchal hypocrite society(s). The role of the media. And a question.	
Heritage Lost	Rohi Jehan	8 min.	Follows modern-day sericulture in Kashmir	
Lungi vs Jeans (Special screening)	Nasir Ali Khan aka RJ Nasir	-	A humorous film comparing jeans and lungi culture.	
Patience on trial	Naureen Farooq	-	This movie is about Orphans.	
Eidyaan	M. Irfan Dar	18 min.	Drama about a lost brother whose return is awaited in a household for over nine years.	Tied for 3rd
Land of no return	M. Gowhar Bhat	13 min.	About Tibetan refugees in India.	

== See also ==
- Kashmiri cinema
- Dogri cinema
- Jammu and Kashmir Academy of Art, Culture and Languages
