= Dogri cinema =

- No. of screens: 100+ Single-screens in Jammu and Himachal Pradesh states of India.
- Main distributors: Yashmi Film Production; Tilak Film Production; Bees Carving Production; Jai Maa Productions

Dogri Cinema or Western Pahari Cinema or Pahariwood refers to cinema in Western Pahari languages especially Dogri language, which is included in the Schedule VIII of the Constitution, spoken primarily in the Jammu Division region of Jammu and Kashmir state and Himachal Pradesh of India.

== History ==
The first Western Pahari film, a black and white film Gallan Hoyein Beetiyan, was made in 1966 while the first colour film in the language, Maa Ni Mildi directed by Roop Sagar, written and produced by Amit Choudhary was released in August 2010. In 1999, first tele-film in the language Chanchlo, was directed by Shanker Bhan with screenplay by B. R. Ishara. The film was made for state-run Srinagar-Doordarshan, Now DD KASHIR and received critical acclaim.

First Dogri film that was released in September 1966 – Kuldip Kumar's Gallan Hoyian Beetiyan – was released at Shanker Theatre, Jammu. In 2003, Children's Film Society of India (CSFI) produced a docu-drama named Himmat in Dogri language – on bravery of children – it participated in Indian panorama at the IFFI in the same year. The first-ever Pahari feature film ‘Lakeer', a venture of the Jammu-based NGO ‘Abhiyaan’, released on Friday, 14 January 2011 at the Hari Theatre, Jammu.The film was directed by Shiv Dutt Sharma and written by Ali Dalaat. In 140-minutes of moving dialogues, soulful music and excellent photography, ‘Lakeer’ tells the tale of a woe of a family that is split apart during the 1947-partition. Neelam Kumar Phull's Kuggi Maar Duaari was the third Dogri film released on 16 December 2011. Appreciated and honoured the crew and Artists with mementos as efforts for promotion of Dogri language and culture by university of Jammu. The movie also recommended by Chief Education officer J&k government for school and college - Awarded 9 LOKRANG awards by regional cultural Groups. 4th Dogri film Reet Produced and Directed by Pankaj Khajuria was released on 21 September 2012. Gul Gulshan Gulfam was the first bilingual (Dogri and Kashmiri) film, directed by Sarfraz Alvi, was released on 14 December 2012. Geetiyan is the biggest hit movie of Dogri Cinema, Directed by Raahul Sharma; released on 28 February 2014. Dille Ch Vasya Koi (2011) directed by Sanjeev Rattan received the National Film Award for Best Feature Film In Dogri.

Saanjh is the first feature film in the Western Pahari language from Himachal Pradesh to be released in cinema halls. The movie is directed by Ajay Saklani.

A Western Pahari Corridor linking the entire Western Pahari speaking population has also been proposed under the Aman ki Asha initiative which includes the suggestion of having a common music and film industry for Jammu, Himachal Pradesh, Azad Kashmir and Pothohar Plateau.

Dogri Folk song 4

== Chronology ==
1. Gallan Hoyein Beetiyan in September 1966
2. Maa Ni Mildi on 13 August 2010 {Yashmi Film Production}
3. Kuggi Maar Duaari {Shree T Creations} Produced and directed by Neelam Kumar Phull, released on 16 December 2011.
4. Dille Ch Vasya Koi (2011) directed by Sanjeev Rattan
5. Reet released on 21 September 2012, {Navrudra Productions} Produced and directed by Pankaj Khajuria
6. Gul Gulshan Gulfam was the first bilingual (Dogri and Kashmiri) film, directed by Sarfraz Alvi, was released on 14 December 2012
7. Geetiyan - {Bees Carving Directs Productions} Directed by Raahul Sharma; released on 28 February 2014
8. Saanjh - 2017
9. Aaun Aan Shinda - directed by Aditya Bhanu is slated to be released on 11 November 2022
10. " Mouj Masti" directed by Heeramani; released on 7 April 2023

== Short films ==
1. Aate Diyan Chidiyan- 2017 Short Film by Rohit K Sharma
2. Bobo Kadu Aaug- Short Film by Ved Rahi

== Under production films ==
1. Pakhroo - under Production
2. Doli - {Jai Maa Productions} under Production

== Best Feature Film in Dogri ==
The National Film Award for Best Feature Film In Dogri is one of the National Film Awards given by Ministry of Information and Broadcasting and Directorate of Film Festivals, India. Till now, it was awarded only at the 59th National Film Awards in 2011 to Dille Ch Vasya Koi (2011) directed by Sanjeev Rattan. As per the Constitution of India, Dogri language is among the languages specified in the Schedule VIII of the Constitution.

== Cinemas in Jammu region ==
Jammu region in Jammu and Kashmir has several multiplex and Single Screen cinemas:

- Sangha Cinema Near Khugha, Akhnoor Cantonment Area, Jammu.
- Swarn Cinema in Gole Market, Gandhi Nagar, Jammu.
- Hari Talkies in Raghunath Bazar, Jammu.
- Tiger Cinema, Cantonment Area, Jammu.
- Shakuntala Theatre, Jammu.
- KC Central Movieplex Cinema, previously known as Indra Theatre, Near State Guest House,Jammu.
- PVR Cinemas, KC Jammu.
- Wave Cinemas, Jammu.
- MovieTime Cinemas in Palm Island Mall, Jammu.
- Apsara Multiplex, Jammu
- AMR Multiplex, Katra
- Moonlight Cineplex, Kathua
- Raj Theatre, Udhampur

== See also ==
- Kashmiri cinema
