= Songs of Paradise =

Indian film

- Official release poster
- Directed by: Danish Renzu
- Written by: Danish Renzu
- Produced by: Ritesh Sidhwani; Farhan Akhtar; Shafat Qazi; Danish Renzu
- Starring: Saba Azad; Soni Razdan; Zain Khan Durrani; Taaruk Raina; Lillete Dubey; Sheeba Chaddha; Shishir Sharma; Lalit Parimoo
- Cinematography: Vincenzo Condorelli
- Edited by: Hemanti Sarkar
- Music by: Peter Gregson
- Production companies: Excel Entertainment; Apple Tree Pictures; Renzu Films
- Distributed by: Amazon MGM Studios
- Release date: 29 August 2025
- Running time: 106 minutes
- Country: India
- Language: Hindi

Songs of Paradise is a 2025 Indian Hindi-language biographical musical drama film directed by Danish Renzu The film is produced by Ritesh Sidhwani, Farhan Akhtar, Shafat Qazi and Danish Renzu, with a screenplay by Danish Renzu, Sunayana Kachroo and dialogues by Niranjan Iyengar. The lead role is played by Saba Azad, Soni Razdan and Zain Khan Durrani. The film also stars Taaruk Raina, Lillete Dubey, Sheeba Chaddha, Shishir Sharma, and Lalit Parimoo. This story follows the journey of a Kashmiri woman who dreams of becoming a singer, inspired by the music of Raj Begum. Raj Begum, known as the Melody Queen of Kashmir, was a Padma Shri awardee and a recipient of the Sangeet Natak Akademi Award. In a recent announcement on Variety, Excel Entertainment came on board as producers for the film. It premiered on Amazon Prime Video on 29 August 2025.

== Premise ==
The movie narrates the tale of the Kashmiri artists, their struggles, and eventual success, regardless of the challenges. The plot is set in Kashmir and showcases the area's music, culture, and history.

== Cast ==
- Saba Azad as young Zeba Akhtar/Noor Begum
- Soni Razdan as older Noor Begum
- Zain Khan Durrani as Azaad Maqbool Shah, Noor's husband
- Sheeba Chaddha as Hameeda
- Lillete Dubey as Khala
- Taaruk Raina as Rumi
- Shishir Sharma as Master Ji
- Lalit Parimoo as Bhan
- Armaan Khera as Kaul
- Bashir Lone as Abba
- Mir Sarwar as Bashir
- Faizaan Bhat
- Mateena Rajput
- Chittaranjan Tripathy as Tiboo
- Junaid Magray
- Rehmat Rattan
- Ahmad Ibn Umar
- Bismah Meer

== Production ==
Saba Azad was cast to play the part of a Kashmiri up-and-coming vocalist in the film, who draws inspiration from a Kashmiri vocalist Raj Begum. The filmmaker disclosed that he enlisted Saba Azad for the main role as the actress is also a musician and originates from Kashmir.

The shooting of the movie took place in various regions of Kashmir and completed on 22 October 2022.

Saba shared a glimpse of her on-screen look in the film on her Instagram, where she can be seen standing in front of a microphone, dressed in traditional attire with a backdrop of musicians playing musical instruments like Sarangi and Santoor.

== Release ==
Songs of Paradise was released on Amazon Prime Video on 29 August 2025.

== Reception ==
Abhishek Srivastava of The Times of India gave 3.5 stars out of 5 and stated that "‘Songs of Paradise’ is a poetic film that moves you with its sheer simplicity. Set against the backdrop of Kashmir in the 50s and 60s, it tells its story with honesty and grace." Rishabh Suri of Hindustan Times gave 3 stars out of 5 and said that "Overall, Songs of Paradise may not rewrite the rules of biographical cinema, but it hums a tune sweet enough to linger." Rahul Desai of The Hollywood Reporter India observed that "Danish Renzu films on Padma Shri Raj Begum, Kashmir’s first female playback singer, presents music without quite exploring it."

Deepa Gahlot of Rediff.com awarded 3 stars out of 5 and observed that "Songs Of Paradise is the story of a female achiever that needed to be told, just as her songs of love and longing deserve to be rediscovered and shared with music aficionados." Shubhra Gupta rated it 2/5 stars and said that "Saba Azad’s Noor Begum comes across as a young woman of the 50s, not an actor trying to do period, the costuming and the body-language feeling as if it could well have belonged to that era." Nandini Ramnath of Scroll.in writes her review that "Except for a flare-up or two, the 106-minute movie is an understated affair, finding its own voice in the gorgeous songs that linger all the way to the closing credits. Renzu replaces outrage, an emotion inevitably associated with works on Kashmir, with restrained remembrance for a rare moment of triumph."

Aishwarya Vasudevan of OTT Play rated it 3/5 stars and said that "Songs of Paradise celebrates Noor Begum’s rise from silence to Kashmiri music icon, with strong performances and scenic charm, though the narrative softens her struggles, leaving a muted impact." Shreyanka Mazumdar of News 18 gave it 3 stars out of 5 and commented that "Songs of Paradise honours Raj Begum through Zeeba Akhtar’s journey in Kashmir, with Saba Azad and Soni Razdan bringing their A game." Vinamra Mathur of Firstpost also gave it 3 stars out of 5 and stated that "Songs of Paradise feels like the right attempt to deflate all the noise and let music do the talking. How far the story of Raj Begum will travel is a question for tomorrow, at least someone attempted to tell it today."

Kusumika Das of Times Now rated it 3/5 stars and said that "Songs of Paradise is not a loud film. It doesn’t try to shock or over-dramatise. It moves at its own gentle pace, asking you to pause and listen. While it leaves you wishing for more detail in certain parts, the sincerity of the performances and the music make it a film worth watching." Troy Ribeiro of Free Press Journal gave it 3.5 stars out of 5 and said that "This film is not a glossy spectacle, nor does it pretend to be. It is a tender portrait of a woman who dared to sing when silence was safer. Its strength lies in the performances and the haunting music that carries Noor Begum’s journey. Its weaknesses, occasional narrative flatness and missed cinematic opportunities, are noticeable but forgivable." Prachi Arya of India Today gave it 3 stars out 5 and said that "'Songs of Paradise', beautifully blends Kashmir's breathtaking landscapes with its rich musical heritage, tracing the inspiring journey of Noor Begum, a woman who defied patriarchy through her voice. Anchored by powerful performances and soulful music, the film is a poignant ode to resilience and art."

Songs of Paradise received attention for its portrayal of Kashmiri history and culture. Gafira Qadir of Middle East Eye described the film as "Bollywood's latest attempt to depoliticise the Kashmir Valley" through "banal art," highlighting how the film simplifies the complex historical and political context of the region.

A review in The Wire pointed out that while Songs of Paradise evokes musical nostalgia and period detail, it falls short in several respects. The critic noted its “glaring omissions,” especially in not engaging with the socio-political complexities of Kashmir's history, and described the dialogue as wavered between caricatured Urdu and lack of authentic Kashmiri speech.

As a counter to propaganda articles by Wire India and Middle East Eye, Nargis Natarajan The Citizen stated that "'If you want to see a side of Kashmir that isn‘t buried under the ‘Files’ of a jaundiced perception; if you want to focus on its rich, poetic culture and not on its conflict scarred image; if you want to stay away from the echoes of violence in a war ridden, geopolitically complex State; and if you want to happily hum the sweet tunes of resonance and resolve, or listen to the musical whispers drifting in the willow trees and in the flowing rivers of the Valley, then watch ‘The Songs Of Paradise."

Hardier Gupta of NDTV gave 3 stars out of 5 and stated that "‘Some films don't scream to be heard; they hum gently, hoping you'll lean in closer. Danish Renzu's Songs of Paradise is one of those films." Nonika Singh of Tribune India gave 3 stars out of 5 and stated that "'Call it by any name — a cinematic tribute, a cultural chronicle of Kashmir or a musical biopic — the film talks to you simply and beautifully in the artistic language of aesthetics. At no stage does it shout from the pulpit to reinforce what it sets out to convey, or drum in the achievements of the legendary but forgotten singer." Anuj Kumar of The Hindu observed that "A musical drama loosely inspired by the life of Padma Shri Raj Begum, Songs of Paradise puts into focus the rich poetic culture of Kashmir that often gets buried under the “Files” of jaundiced perceptions. It is the side of Kashmir that we have hardly seen in Bollywood."

Rashmi Vasudeva of Deccan Herald gave 3 stars out of 5 and stated that "'Kashmir, in this tale of quiet rebellion, serves as a beautiful backdrop at best, and its seething conflicts, growing discontent, and religious clashes barely get a mention."

Based on Rediff reviews and year-ender lists, Songs of Paradise is recognized as a standout OTT film of 2025. The film is featured on Rediff in several categories regarding 2025's best content including Best Film OTT, Best Actor and Best Actress.

== Awards ==
Songs of Paradise won Best Film and Best Actress at Jagran Film Festival. Songs of Paradise have also been nominated at various awards including Best Supporting Actress Soni Razdan at News Reel 18 REEL Movie Award, Best Screenplay Danish Renzu and Best Actress Saba Azad at Screen Awards, Best Actress Saba Azad and Best Supporting Actress Soni Razdan at Star Eminence Awards. The film was just recently nominated under Best Actor, Best Actress and Best Film at Star Icon International Awards and Best Film, Best Director and Best Actress at Nexa Indian Academy Awards
