= Sunayna =

Sunayna, Sunayana or Sunaina is an Indian female given name which means beautiful eyes in Sanskrit and may refer to:

== People ==
- Sunayana (Ramayana), Queen of Videha, wife of king Janaka and mother of Hindu goddess Sita and her sister Urmila in the ancient Indian epic Ramayana
- Sunaina, Indian actress
- Sunaina Anand, Indian weightlifter
- Sunayana Fozdar (born 1986), Indian television actress
- Sunayana Hazarilal, Indian classical dancer
- Sunayana Kachroo, Indian-American writer and poet
- Sunaina Kejriwal (1971–2024), Indian art curator
- Sunayna Kuruvilla (born 1999), Indian squash player
- Sunayna Wahi (born 1990), Indian-Surinamese sprinter

== Others ==
- Sunayana (film), a 1979 Indian Hindi-language family drama film by Hiren Nag
- Sunaina (TV series), a 2008 Indian TV series
- INS Sunayna (P57), an Indian ship

== See also ==
- Sunayani Devi (1875–1962), Indian painter
