= Suraj Sharma =

Indian actor (born 1993)

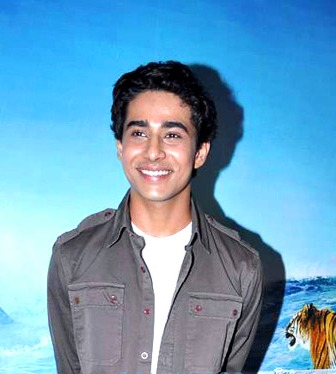
- Sharma promoting Life of Pi in 2012
- Born: 21 March 1993 (age 33); New Delhi, India
- Education: St. Stephen's College, University of Delhi
- Occupation: Actor
- Years active: 2012–present

Suraj Sharma (born 21 March 1993) is an Indian actor who made his debut in the 2012 film Life of Pi. Directed by Ang Lee, the film was adapted from the novel of the same name, and earned Sharma critical acclaim as well as a BAFTA Rising Star Award nomination. In 2014, he portrayed Aayan Ibrahim in season 4 of the Showtime series Homeland. From 2018 to 2020, he starred as Rakesh Singh in the CBS comedy-drama series God Friended Me.

== Life and career ==
Sharma was born and brought up in an Indian family in New Delhi, India. His father, Gokul Churai, is a software engineer from Thalassery, Kerala and a professional chess player, while his mother, Shailaja Sharma, is an economist from Palakkad, Kerala. He has a younger brother, Sriharsh Sharma, who has also acted in two films, and a younger sister, Dhruvatara Sharma. He attended Sardar Patel Vidyalaya secondary school, and later studied at St. Stephen's College, Delhi University. With no prior acting experiences, he auditioned along with his brother for the role of Piscine Molitor "Pi" Patel in Life of Pi (2012). Sharma went through several rounds of auditions before winning the title role, beating out 3,000 other young men. Director Ang Lee has stated that he selected Sharma primarily based on his expressive eyes and innocent appearance. According to him, Sharma had not only the emotion, but also the "look" of Pi. His "medium complexion" and "average build" were deemed perfect for the role. The film was met with critical acclaim, winning four Academy Awards; Sharma's performance received positive reviews, and he was nominated for the BAFTA Rising Star Award.

After filming Life of Pi, Sharma returned to studying philosophy at St. Stephen's College, with the intention of continuing to work in filmmaking in some capacity. He subsequently undertook a Bachelor of Fine Arts degree at New York University Tisch School of the Arts. In 2014, he portrayed Aayan Ibrahim, nephew of a terrorist, in season 4 of the Showtime political thriller series Homeland. That same year, he portrayed Rinku Singh in the sports biopic Million Dollar Arm. He then co-starred with Tony Revolori in the Indian comedy-drama Umrika, which premiered at the 2015 Sundance Film Festival. In 2016, he starred in the Mongolian-American adventure drama film Burn Your Maps. He has also portrayed the role of Kanan Gill in his first Bollywood venture, Anshai Lal's romance comedy Phillauri co-starring Anushka Sharma and Diljit Dosanjh. From 2018 to 2020, he starred as Rakesh Singh in the CBS comedy-drama series God Friended Me. In 2019, he appeared in the American science fiction black comedy slasher film Happy Death Day 2U, a sequel to Christopher Landon's 2017 film Happy Death Day. In the same year, he appeared as Hassan in Danish Renzu's Indian American English-language drama film titled The Illegal.

In May 2021, Sharma was cast in How I Met Your Mother spinoff series, How I Met Your Father led by Hilary Duff. In November 2021, Duff and the cast confirmed via social media accounts that the series would premiere on 18 January 2022. The series was released on 18 January 2022. On 15 February 2022, Hulu renewed the series for a 20-episode second season.

== Filmography ==
=== Film ===
Year	Title	Role	Notes
2012	Life of Pi	Piscine Molitor "Pi" Patel, age 16/17	Nominated – BAFTA Rising Star Award
2014	Million Dollar Arm	Rinku Singh	
2015	Umrika	Ramakant	
2016	Burn Your Maps	Ismail	
2017	Phillauri	Kanan Gill	
2017	The Hungry	Ankur Joshi	
2017	The Lost	Dev Mukherjee	Short film
2019	Happy Death Day 2U	Samar Ghosh	
2019	Killerman	FedEx	
2019	The Illegal	Hassan	
2022	Wedding Season	Ravi	
2023	Gulmohar	Aditya	
2025	This Tempting Madness	Ajay	

=== Television ===
Year	Title	Role	Notes
2014–2015	Homeland	Aayan Ibrahim	7 episodes
2018–2020	God Friended Me	Rakesh Singh	Series regular
2020	Little America	Kabir	Episode: "The Manager"
2022–2023	How I Met Your Father	Sid	Main Cast
2022	Pantheon	IT Officer (voice)	Episode: “The Gods Will Not Be Slain”
2023	Star Wars: Visions	Charuk (voice)	Episode: "The Bandits of Golak"
2026	The Night Agent	Jay Batra	Recurring (season 3)

== Awards and nominations ==
Year	Award	Category	Work	Result
2012	British Academy Film Awards	Rising Star	Life of Pi	Nominated
2012	Critics' Choice Movie Awards	Best Young Actor/Actress	Life of Pi	Nominated
2012	Las Vegas Film Critics Society	Youth in Film	Life of Pi	Won
2012	Phoenix Film Critics Society	Breakthrough Performance on Camera	Life of Pi	Nominated
2013	NAACP Image Awards	Outstanding Actor in a Motion Picture	Life of Pi	Nominated
2013	MTV Movie Awards	Best Breakthrough Performance	Life of Pi	Nominated
2013	MTV Movie Awards	Best Scared-As-Shit Performance	Life of Pi	Won
2013	Saturn Awards	Best Performance by a Younger Actor	Life of Pi	Won
2013	Empire Awards	Best Male Newcomer	Life of Pi	Nominated
2013	Online Film & Television Association Awards	Best Breakthrough Performance – Male	Life of Pi	Nominated
2015	London Indian Film Festival	Pure Heaven Outstanding Young Talent	Himself	Won
2021	Yellowstone International Film Festival	Best Actor	The Illegal	Won
2023	2023 Filmfare OTT Awards	Best Supporting Actor in a Web Original Film	Gulmohar	Won

== See also ==
- Indians in the New York City metropolitan area
