= Half Widow =

- Half Widow Release Poster
- Directed by: Danish Renzu
- Written by: Danish Renzu
- Produced by: Gaya Bhola; Danish Renzu
- Starring: Neelofar Hamid; Shahnawaz Bhat; Mir Sarwar; Haseena Sofi
- Cinematography: Antonio Cisneros
- Edited by: Nitin Baid
- Music by: Alokananda Dasgupta; Sonu Nigam; Dilip Langoo
- Production companies: Renzu Films; Gaya Art Films
- Release dates: 16 December 2017 (South Asian International Film Festival); 6 January 2020 (India)
- Running time: 91 minutes
- Country: India
- Language: Urdu

Half Widow is a 2017 Indian drama film directed by debutant Danish Renzu and written by Renzu and Gaya Bhola. The film tells the story of a woman from Srinagar in Kashmir, who tries to find her husband who is abducted. Jointly produced by Bhola and Renzu, the film stars Neelofar Hamid, Shahnawaz Bhat, Mir Sarwar and Haseena Sofi. Because there are no theaters in Kashmir, the film was screened at the Sher-i-Kashmir International Conference Centre. The title of the film refers to the namesake term used for Kashmiri women whose husbands have disappeared mostly in custody of security forces in the Kashmir conflict. The film's official trailer was released in May 2017. The characters in the film talk in Urdu, with some Kashmiri. The film received a favourable review on Cineblitz. The film was released theatrically on 6 January 2020 in India.

== Cast ==
- Neelofar Hamid as Neela
- Shahnawaz Bhat as Zakir
- Mir Sarwar as Khalid
- Haseena Sofi as Khala
- Rhonda Leal as Eva
- Yasmeena Wani as Zumba
- Ayaan Sikander as Faizan

== Production ==
Director Danish Renzu was doing a job at AT&T in the United States. He came back to India in 2015 as he wanted to "tell stories from my world and the place I grew up in" that need attention and platform. The film was shot in the valleys of Kashmir with local cast and crew. Sheikh Neelofar handled the casting part and approached some actors including a Bollywood actor Mir Sarwar. Due to the local people involved Renzu was able to shoot the film in several unexplored locations. The last schedule of filming was delayed due to the 2016 Kashmir Uprising in the valley. The film's dialogue writer Sunayana Kachroo, who is a poet, said that she felt the need to tell this story as "men in conflict zones are celebrated, decorated, and revered for their heroism", but the women and children are referred to as "the bystanders of the discord". She further said: "The first and the last victims of war are always the women and the children and, due to this, they are also the torchbearers of change and progress."

== Reception ==
Niyati Bhat of The Hindu wrote: "'Half Widow' does not fall into the Bollywood trap of the formula Kashmir film" Aakansha Naval of Cineblitz gave it 4 stars out of 5 and wrote "it's a hard look at the harrowing and emotional trauma of half widows in Kashmir, Danish Renzu's directorial debut is storytelling at its best and not to be missed. Danish Renzu's Half Widow differs. In fact, not just from these two films, but also from every other film that's either been made, based, set or shot in Kashmir!" Keyur Seta of Cinestaan gave it 3 stars out of 4 and write: "It is a more intimate portrayal and captures the lives of ordinary Kashmiris. The simple and realistic dialogues are an example. The use of the local language in a number of places adds to the realism." Nandini Ramnath of Scroll in praised the lead actors performance and wrote: "Neelofar Hamid's sensitive and affecting portrayal accommodates the spectrum of Neela's emotional experiences, from loneliness to comfort in family and community, and from despair to hope. Neela's dilemma, articulated through a voiceover by dialogue writer Sunayna Kachroo, moves away from politics towards the direction of poetics. There is immense poignancy and wistfulness in Neela's ruminations. The seasons change, but no season brought you back, Neela says to herself as she remembers Khalid." Sanjana Bhagwat of Shorted wrote: "This is just what the film is – grounded, honest and real, without any glossiness of romanticism or manipulation. Familiar songs like ‘Dilbaro’ and ‘Ae Watan’ sound starkly different without the sheen of being in a Bollywood film; they can be heard in Half Widow through the static of radios or the off-key, asynchronous hum of a children's choir."

== Awards and festivals ==
Festivals

- CAAMFest, San Francisco
- Seattle International Film Festival, Seattle
- Asian Film Festival of Dallas, Dallas
- Indie Meme International Film Festival, Texas
- Vancouver South Asian Film Festival, Canada
- South Asian International Film Festival, New York
- Innovative International Film Festival, Bangalore
- 2nd New Delhi Film Festival, Delhi
- Le Festival des Films Indiens de Toulouse, France
- Jaipur International Film Festival, Jaipur
- Tasveer South Asian Film Festival, Seattle
- Chicago South Asian Film Festival, Chicago
- Houston Asian American Pacific Islander Film Festival (HAAPIFest), Houston
- UN Women, Los Angeles chapter (SPECIAL SCREENING)
- Boston Indian and International Film Festival, Boston
- Mustard Seed Film Festival of Philadelphia, Philadelphia
- San Luis Obispo International Film Festival, San Luis Obispo
- DC South Asian Film Festival, Washington DC
- New Jersey Indian & International Film Festival, New Jersey
- Caelesdoscope International Film Festival, Rhode Island
- Hyderabad Bengali Film Festival, Hyderabad
- Indian Film Festival of Cincinnati, Ohio
- National Film Festival of Kerala, Kochi
- Third Eye Asian Film Festival, Mumbai
- Indian Film Festival Of Prague

Nominations

- Best Actress (Neelofar Hamid) - Boston Indian and International Film Festival
- Best Film - Boston Indian and International Film Festival
- Le Festival des Films Indiens de Toulouse - Film Critics Circle of India Award for the Best Debut Director Danish Renzu
- In Competition at Asia Pacific Screen Awards, Australia

Awards

- Audience Choice, Best Feature Film - 2017 South Asian International Film Festival, New York (world premiere)
- Audience Choice, Best Feature Film - 2018 Vancouver South Asian International Film Festival, Canada
- Best Film Award - 2018 New Jersey Indian and International Film Festival
- Best Director Award Danish Renzu - 2018 New Jersey Indian and International Film Festival
- Best Actress (Neelofar Hamid) - 2018 Caelesdoscope International Film Festival
- Best Cinematography (Antonio Cisneros) - 2018 Boston Indian and International Film Festival, Boston
- Best Film Critics Choice - 2019 Indian Film Festival of Cincinnati, Cincinnat
