= Shafat Qazi =

Kashmiri film producer

- Education: Master's in Structural Engineering; Bachelor's in Civil Engineering
- Alma mater: National Institute of Technology; State University of New York
- Occupations: Film producer; Founder and former CEO, BQE Software
- Board member of: BQE Software Inc. Structural Engineers Association of Southern California; Chair, Structural Engineers Association Computer Applications Committee

Shafat Qazi is a Kashmiri-American entrepreneur and film producer. He is the Founder and former CEO of BQE Software, a cloud-based project management and accounting software company. In 2018, he was listed among the top 50 CEOs by USA Today.

== Early life and education ==
Qazi was born in Kashmir, India and later relocated to New York in 1986. Qazi had his schooling done from Burn Hall and later obtained his bachelor's degree in civil engineering from the National Institute of Technology in India. He later pursued a master's degree in structural engineering from the State University of New York at Buffalo. While at SUNY Buffalo, Qazi developed a medical billing software for his personal doctor, eventually leading him to venture into the software development industry. His father retired as the principal of the Amar Singh College in Srinagar.

== Career ==
After completing his education, Qazi moved to Los Angeles in 1988 to pursue his career in engineering. He joined David C. Breiholz, Inc., an engineering company, and later became a partner in the firm. The firm was subsequently renamed Breiholz Qazi Engineering. During this time, Qazi also served as the chairman of the Structural Engineers Association Computer Applications Committee and a board member of the association. In 1995, Qazi sold his shares at Breiholz Qasi Engineering and co-founded BQE Software with his partner, David Breiholz. BQE Software initially developed BillQuick, a project management and billing software. By 1998, Qazi left his engineering firm to focus full-time on BillQuick and his company. As the company expanded, it ventured into accounting, resource planning, and business intelligence. In 2009, BQE Software acquired another software company, OrangeLoft LLC. In 2012, BQE Software launched its product, BQE Core.

Apart from his involvement in software, Qazi has also ventured into the music industry. He created a music brand called IBM with singers Mohammed Irfan, Bilal, and Mehmeet Syed. He supported the band in organizing music concerts worldwide.

Qazi has also been involved in the independent film industry. He produced Songs of Paradise, a feature film inspired by the songs of Raj Begum and narrates the story of a Kashmiri woman who faced the barriers of societal norms in the late 1940s, particularly regarding the acceptability of women singing publicly in Kashmir and neighboring cities.

== BQE Software and Serent Capital Acquisition ==
Qazi founded BQE Software in 1995, initially bootstrapping the company to serve the architectural and engineering sectors. Under his leadership, the company developed a deep strategic partnership with Intuit, becoming one of the earliest and most prominent integrators for QuickBooks. By focusing on automated billing and project management, BQE expanded its user base to over 400,000 professionals globally.

In March 2021, after 25 years of independent growth, Qazi led the company through a major milestone when Serent Capital, a private equity firm, made a significant strategic investment in BQE Software. This transaction marked Qazi's transition from Chief Executive Officer to a member of the Board of Directors, where he continues to serve as an advisor on product strategy and innovation.

The company maintains a significant global footprint, including a large development and support hub in Srinagar, which Qazi established to leverage local technical talent from his home region.
