= Saffron Kingdom =

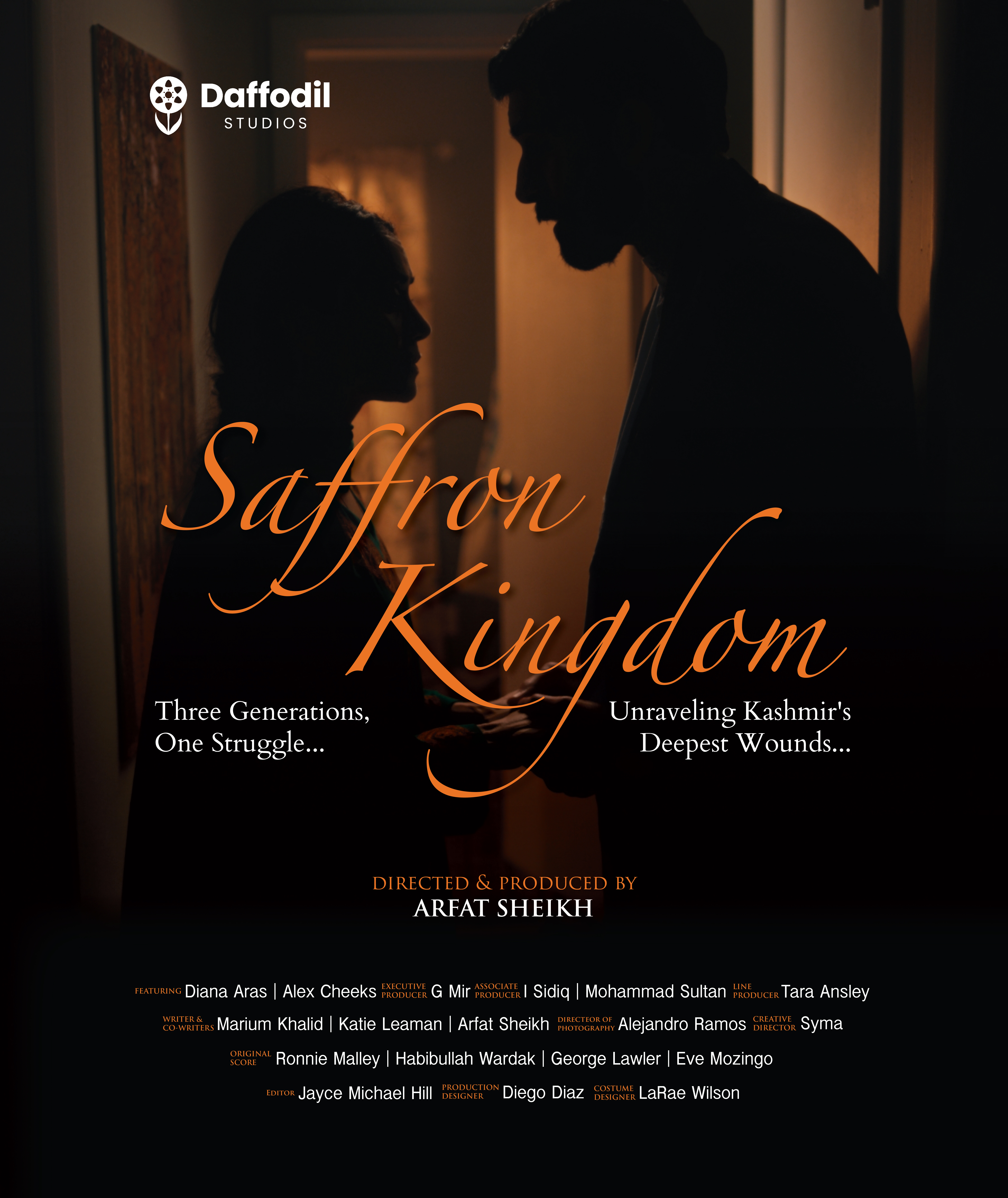
- Theatrical release poster
- Directed by: Arfat Sheikh
- Written by: Arfat Sheikh; Marium Khalid; Katie Leaman
- Produced by: Daffodil Studios; Arfat Sheikh
- Starring: Diana Aras; Mohammed Fahmy; Anna Talakkottur
- Production company: Daffodil Studios
- Release date: October 2024 (Rome International Film Festival)
- Running time: 83 minutes
- Country: United States
- Languages: English, Kashmiri

Saffron Kingdom is a 2024 independent drama film directed by Arfat Sheikh. The film explores themes related to the Kashmiri diaspora and political tensions in Kashmir. It has been billed the "first Kashmiri-American film" and has positioned itself as denying Indian stance about Kashmir seen in Bollywood films.

After a number of screenings around the world, the film was released in 2026 on Watermelon Pictures' streaming platform Watermelon+. In September of that year, the film saw a wide release in the United Kingdom, screening for 62 shows.

== Plot ==
The film follows Masrat, a Kashmiri woman who flees the valley with her son Rizwan after the abduction of her husband. The narrative traces their life in exile, the persistence of memory and intergenerational trauma, and their attempts to rebuild identity and belonging in a new country.

== Cast ==
- Diana Aras as Masrat
- Alex Cheeks as Rizwan
- Mohammed Fahmy as Chachu
- Anna Talakkottur as Wafa
- Marisol Ray as Pophai
- Ahmad Ghafouri as Young Chachu
- Laura Lopez as Young Pophai
- Anthony S. Goolsby as Professor Reid
- Isabella Fajardo as Young Masrat

== Production ==
The film was developed and directed by Arfat Sheikh and produced through Daffodil Studios. It was made on a budget of approximately US$1 million, with filming primarily taking place in the Metro Atlanta area. Because of political restrictions and safety concerns, only about 16–17 minutes of the film are set in Kashmir; the rest is set in Atlanta.

Many in the Kashmiri diaspora were reluctant to participate in the project due to fear of potential repercussions. During a BBC Urdu interview in 2025, Sheikh stated that he had initially hoped to cast Kashmiri‑speaking actors, but several either declined to participate or later withdrew, citing safety concerns. As a result, the production brought in non‑Kashmiri actors and provided language coaching for the Kashmiri‑language portions of the script.

Filming was conducted with a minimal crew under tight logistical constraints, particularly for scenes referencing or set in Kashmir. To navigate political sensitivities, most of the Kashmir segments were shot discreetly or recreated outside the region. The crew was composed of both American and South Asian professionals, reflecting the diasporic themes explored in the film. Saffron Kingdom premiered at several international film festivals, receiving attention for its bold narrative and unconventional production approach.

== Release ==
The film premiered on the festival circuit in 2025 at the Wake Forest Film Festival in North Carolina, where it won the Best Feature Film award. It was selected for the Rome International Film Festival, ARRF Berlin, and Florida South Asia Film Festival. It was also shown at the Teaneck International Film Festival, where director Arfat Sheikh won the Emerging Filmmaker Activist Award. The film has been screened across the United States and in theaters in Australia, New Zealand, the United Kingdom, and Canada.

It has also been screened at universities and cultural centres, including the South Asia Research Institute at the Australian National University. Distribution has also been handled through Daffodil Studios.

== Reception ==
The Independent described the film as “a haunting response to dominant narratives on Kashmir.” TRT World called it “a reclamation of memory through visual storytelling.”

Times Headline wrote that the film “beautifully encapsulates the rich heritage of Kashmir, symbolised by its renowned saffron cultivation and also challenges the politicised narratives often imposed on the region.” Kashmir Pen praised it, stating that “in Saffron Kingdom, Sheikh does what Bollywood has failed to do for decades — he gives the Kashmiri people their voice back.”

Saporta Report highlighted how the film depicts “the humanistic approach to displacement and the immigration experience,” tracing a Kashmiri family's journey from the 1990s to Atlanta in 2019.

Arfat Sheikh was interviewed by Project Censored about the film's production and impact. Interviewer Eleanor Goldfield described the film as "beautiful in both terrible and positive ways, as I imagine the Kashmiri experience is".

Sheikh has also been interviewed for a number of other publications and podcasts, including Kashmir Times. The film has also been covered by Muslim news outlets like 5Pillars, who reported on the largest screening of the film in Birmingham in the UK. The 5Pillars article described the feeling of watching the film as, "being introduced painfully and intimately to a people and a land whose suffering is too often ignored."

Some reviewers noted limitations: while the emotional resonance and storytelling have been praised, the use of English-accented dialogue and the lack of Kashmiri-speaking actors were seen as reducing the sense of authenticity by some audience members.

== See also ==
- Cinema of Kashmir
