= Real Kashmir Football Club (TV series) =

- Genre: Sports drama
- Showrunner: Mahesh Mathai
- Written by: Simaab Hashmi; Umang Vyas; Dhruv Narang; Danish Renzu
- Directed by: Rajesh Mapuskar; Mahesh Mathai
- Starring: Manav Kaul; Mohammed Zeeshan Ayyub
- Composers: Benedict Taylor; Naren Chandavarkar
- Country of origin: India
- Original language: Hindi
- No. of seasons: 1
- No. of episodes: 8

Production
- Production location: India
- Cinematography: Saurabh Monga
- Editor: Parikshhit Jha
- Production companies: Jaya Entertainment; Oshun Entertainment

Original release
- Network: SonyLIV
- Release: 9 December 2025

Real Kashmir Football Club is an Indian sports drama television series starring Mohammed Zeeshan Ayyub and Manav Kaul in lead roles and is inspired by the real-life story of Real Kashmir FC, the first professional football club from Jammu and Kashmir. The series is directed by Mahesh Mathai and Rajesh Mapuskar and produced by Jaya Entertainment, Oshun Entertainment, Kapital Entertainment, and SK Global Entertainment.

== Premise ==
Inspired by a true story, follows two dreamers and twenty underdog players as they chase the possibility of creating a professional football team in Kashmir. What begins as a distant ambition tested by setbacks, small triumphs, and personal sacrifice slowly becomes a source of hope for them and for those who follow their rise. The show traces how one idea grows far beyond the team that started it.

== Cast ==
- Mohammed Zeeshan Ayyub as Sohail Meer
- Manav Kaul as Shirish Kemmu
- Abhishant Rana as Amaan
- Adhir Bhatt as Nazir
- Anmol Dhillon Thakeria as Azlan
- Shahid Mushtaq
- Shubhang Chaturvedi
- Mark Bennington as coach Douglas
- Saud Al Rasdid Para
- Afnan Fazli
- Adil Pala
- Imran Farooq
- Khusshal Maggo
- Muazzam Bhat
- Shaheem Bhat

== Production ==
The series was announced as part of SonyLIV's 2025 slate of original programming. According to early reports, the show was developed to capture the inspirational real-life journey of Real Kashmir FC, formed amid challenging circumstances in the region.

SonyLIV described the show as "a story of rookies, of strangers, of turmoil — but above all, a story of love: for the game, for Kashmir, for possibility."

== Release ==
The series will be streaming on SonyLIV starting December 9, 2025.

== Reception ==
In its review, Sana Farzeen of India Today described the series as a grounded and realistic portrayal of youth aspirations in Kashmir, noting that the series avoids exaggerated dramatization and focuses instead on the social and emotional challenges faced by the characters. The review praised the performances of Mohammed Zeeshan Ayyub and Manav Kaul, while also mentioning that the narrative occasionally follows familiar sports-drama patterns. Shubhra Gupta of Indian Express gave 3 out of 5 stars and quoted "Mohammed Zeeshan Ayyub, Manav Kaul series scores on heart" Rahul Desai of The Hollywood Reporter India described the series as "The Sport of Good Storytelling" Nida Mehraj of Deccan Chronicle gave 3 out of 5 stars and reviewed the series as "Real Kashmir FC Delivers Grit and Heart, Despite Its Rough Edges" Shreyas Pande of The Hindu reviewed the series and described it as "A breezy soccer tale undermined by wayward writing" Nandini Ramnath of Scroll.in reviewed the series as "Feel-good sports drama scores a goal for empathy" Sriva A of moneycontrol described the series as "Mohammed Zeeshan Ayub and Manav Kaul score big and shine in inspiring Kashmir football story" Shubhangi Shah of TheWeek reviewed the series and quoted "Mohammed Zeeshan Ayyub shines in SonyLIV's gentle underdog saga"

== Episodes ==
The series consists of eight episodes streaming on SonyLIV.

No.	Title	Release date	Runtime	Summary
1	Kickoff	8 December 2025	52 minutes	Disillusioned with journalism, Sohail decides to change Kashmir for the better by starting a professional football club. He tries to convince his childhood friend Mustafa to coach RKFC and approaches businessman Shirish for funding, who knows nothing about football.
2	Pressing	8 December 2025	38 minutes	With financier Shirish and coach Mustafa on board and the squad selected, Sohail must complete formalities to ensure RKFC meets league compliance requirements.
3	In Possession	8 December 2025	35 minutes	To qualify for a league tournament, RKFC must recruit local star Shah. The task is difficult because Shah has a confrontational past with Mustafa.
4	Transition To Defence	8 December 2025	39 minutes	Shah joins the club and the team travels to Delhi for the qualifying tournament, where events on and off the field begin to go wrong.
5	Own-Goal	8 December 2025	32 minutes	After the Delhi setback, tensions rise and some players consider leaving. Sohail must keep Mustafa, re-sign Shah, and manage Shirish, who now wants a greater role in club management.
6	Regroup	8 December 2025	39 minutes	Sohail agrees with Shirish to bring in an international coach to improve RKFC's chances, but informing Mustafa of this decision causes a serious disagreement.
7	Counterattack	8 December 2025	45 minutes	International coach Douglas arrives and sees the challenges of building a club in Srinagar. Sohail and Shirish slowly move the club closer to league qualification.
8	Goal!	8 December 2025	40 minutes	Players learn that their qualification match would be against a security forces team at the local cantonment, sparking debate over whether to play.

== See also ==
- Real Kashmir FC
- SonyLIV original programming
