= Asif Basra =

Indian actor (1967–2020)

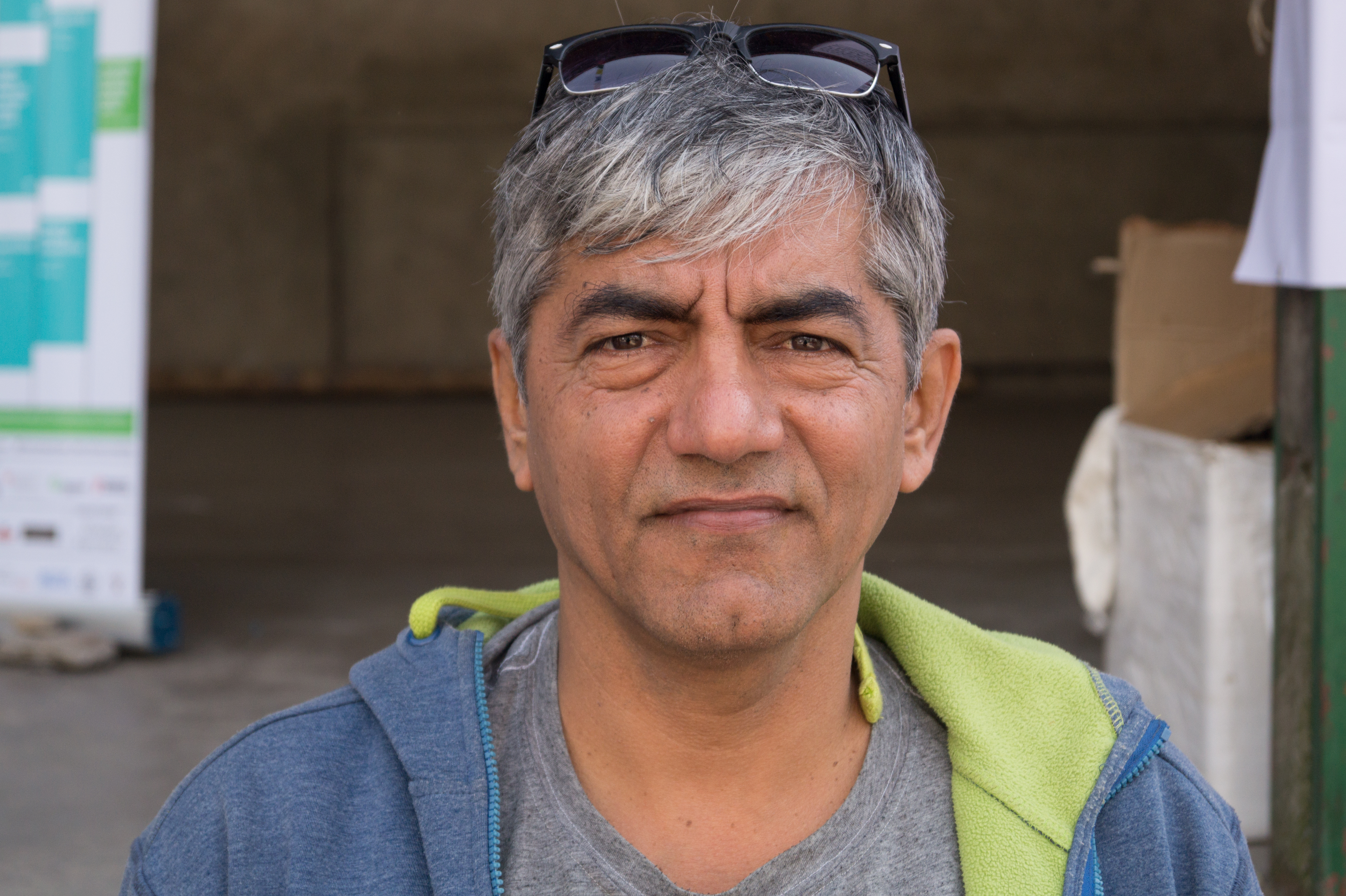
- Basra in 2016
- Born: 27 July 1967; Amravati, Maharashtra, India
- Died: 12 November 2020 (aged 53); Dharamshala, Himachal Pradesh, India
- Education: Bombay University
- Occupation: Actor
- Years active: 1998–2020

Asif Basra (27 July 1967 – 12 November 2020) was an Indian actor who worked in Bollywood films and TV serials. He is best known to Western audiences for his role in American film Outsourced (2006). He also appeared in many other films, including One Night with the King (2006). Basra died of suicide by hanging in 2020. There was reportedly suspicion that he might have been murdered but the case was closed as no supporting evidence was found.

== Early life and education ==
Asif Basra was born on 27 July 1967 in Amravati, Maharashtra, India. In 1989, he moved to Mumbai and attended University of Mumbai, and acted in college productions. He regularly won prizes for the characters he played during this time. He graduated with a Bachelor's degree in Physics.

== Acting career ==
Basra performed in Anurag Kashyap's Black Friday and Rahul Dholakia's Parzania, which received much critical appreciation. He appeared in Michael O. Sajbeland's One Night with the King with veteran actors Omar Sharif and Peter O'Toole. He played a tailor in the Hindi movie Lamhaa; he appeared in 2010's top-grossing Bollywood film Once Upon a Time in Mumbaai as Shoaib's (Emraan Hashmi) father. Basra was also known for his theatrical performances from playing five characters in Feroz Abbas Khan's production of Mahatma v/s Gandhi. Other performances include a child with spina bifida in Main Bhi Superman and Horatio in Hamlet.

In 2020, Basra appeared in two web series: Paatal Lok on Amazon Prime and Hostages on Hotstar. He worked in Hindi, Gujarati, Tamil, and Malayalam films. He was last seen in the second season of the Amazon Prime Video web series The Family Man which released on 4 June in 2021.

== Death ==
Basra's body was found hanging in a private guest house in McLeod Ganj, in Dharamshala, Himachal Pradesh on 12 November 2020 at age 53. The investigation into his death was inconclusive and the case was closed as suicide.

== Filmography ==
=== Film ===
Year	Film/television	Role	Notes	Ref
1998	Woh	History Teacher Omkarnath Dikshit	Hindi film debut	
2003	Rules: Pyaar Ka Superhit Formula	Aakash		
2003	Quicksand	Airman		
2004	Black Friday	Shanawaz Qureshi		
2004	Love in Nepal	Ram Nath Mohan		
2005	Parzania		Premiered at 36th India International Film Festival, Goa	
2006	Outsourced	Puro N. Virajnarianan		
2006	One Night with the King	Cameo		
2006	Mixed Doubles	Doctor		
2007	Jab We Met	Railway Station Vendor 1		
2008	Tandoori Love	T.V. Kumar		
2009	Chal Chala Chal	Harilal		
2010	Once Upon a Time in Mumbaai	Hussain Khan		
2010	Lamhaa	Driver		
2010	Knock Out	Police Inspector		
2010	Kushti	Post Master		
2013	Kai Po Che	Ali's father		
2013	The Attacks of 26/11	Taxi Driver		
2013	Krrish 3	Dr. Alok Sen		
2014	Ek Villain	Aadesh Varma		
2014	Manjunath	Devendra		
2014	Anjaan	Rajiv	Tamil film	
2016	Wrong Side Raju	Amitabh Shah	Gujarati film	
2016	Freaky Ali	Kishan Lal		
2017	Saanjh	Sanju's Father	Himachali film	
2017	Sheitaan			
2017	Islamic Exorcist	Exorcist		
2018	Kaalakaandi	Raza Arif		
2018	Hichki	Shyamlal, peon		
2018	Fanney Khan	Vivek Sir, Producer		
2019	The Tashkent Files	Media Company, Boss		
2019	Satellite Shankar	Cab Driver		
2019	P Se Pyaar F Se Faraar	Sompal Singh		
2020	Big Brother	Muthan	Malayalam film	
2021	Sooryavanshi	Rafique	Posthumous release	

=== Web series ===
Year	Film/Television	Role	Network	Notes	Refs
2018	Rangbaaz	SI Bhangwan Mishra	Zee5		
2020	Paatal Lok	Jai Malik	Amazon Prime Video		
2020	Hostages	Asghar Nabi	Disney+ Hotstar		
2021	The Family Man (Season 2)	Counsellor	Amazon Prime Video	Posthumously released	Released on 3 June 2021
