= Women's rights in Jammu and Kashmir =

Women's rights in Jammu and Kashmir is a major issue. Belonging to a patriarchal society, they have had to fight inequality and routine discrimination. Women's rights in Kashmir Valley has major issues as there is harassment of young muslim women participating in sports activities, demands of dowry after marriage, domestic violence incidents, acid attacks on women , and men being generally taken in a higher regard than women. Many small organisations have been formed to struggle for women's rights in Jammu and Kashmir.

== Education ==
J&K's social, economic and political conditions have increased gender disparity in the region, with men dominating its socio-economic and political processes. Women's roles have traditionally been domestic, and women in rural areas do not have access to education. According to a 2011 census, the literacy rate in J&K was 68.74 per cent; literacy among women was 58.01 per cent. The female high-school dropout rate is higher than the male rate, and one out of every three adult women in J&K is unable to read or write (compared with one out of five adult males).

In many rural areas, the birth of a son is celebrated; the birth of a daughter is not. Males are seen as able to get a job and help support a family; females are seen as an expense, since they will marry and leave home.

Article 10 of the United Nations General Assembly's Convention on the Elimination of All Forms of Discrimination Against Women recognises that such gender inequality can be eliminated only by education. The government of Jammu and Kashmir, realising that gender disparity in education must be removed for women in the Kashmir Valley, has begun a number of initiatives. Qualified female teachers are underemployed, however; school infrastructure is poor, and student-teacher ratios are high.

== Citizenship ==
According to the UN General Assembly's Universal Declaration of Human Rights, the principle of citizenship operates on the assumption of equality between men and women. In Jammu and Kashmir, however, citizenship is unequal among men and women. If a woman from J&K marries a foreigner, she loses her right to inherit, own or buy immovable property in the state; no such law affects a male in a similar situation. Secularists and ethnic nationalists believe that J&K can survive amid globalization with its identity intact only by protecting Kashmiri culture, and Kashmiri women are discouraged from crossing the cultural threshold; inequality in citizenship is justified as preserving the state.

On 7 October 2002, the Jammu and Kashmir High Court overturned the established legal position. The court ruled that by marrying an outsider, a J&K woman did not lose her permanent-resident status. It was further stated that the original document that had been used as evidence for depriving women of their citizenship did not expressly state so. The decision was contested by the state's political parties, who drafted a bill known as the Daughters Bill or the Permanent Residents' (Disqualification) Bill stripping a woman of permanent resident-status if she married a foreigner. According to law minister Muzaffar Beg, it was "universally accepted that the woman follows the domicile of her husband."

Although the bill was not passed, a similar bill was introduced in March 2010 ostensibly to stave off demographic change; however, the rationale did not address the male role (through intermarriage) in demographic change. That bill was not passed, but it has considerable support.

== Role of women in the conflict ==
In 1989, Kashmiri dissatisfaction with Indian rule led to the Kashmir conflict resulting in the abuse of women in the region According to a report by Human Rights Watch in 1993, the Indian security forces use rape as a method of retaliation against Kashmiri civilians during reprisal attacks after militant ambushes. Professor William Baker states that rape in Kashmir was not the result of a few undisciplined soldiers but an active attempt by the Indian security forces to humiliate and intimidate the Kashmiri population.

When public support of the militancy began to diminish, many militants turned to the political arena; however, the voices of women have not been accorded their rightful place in the dialogues of the Kashmiri conflict and politics. Although women have been the hardest-hit victims of the conflict and have played pivotal roles in separatism and the armed insurgency, their activities are barely mentioned in mainstream narratives of Kashmiri militancy. The media seems uneasy with the idea of female Kashmiri involvement in militancy; when a woman is charged as an overground operative of a militant group, the media swiftly declares her innocent or justifies her.

=== Dukhtaran-e-Milat ===
Dukhtaran-e-Millat (DeM) is a women's organisation which was founded in 1981 by Asiya Andrabi. The group's early goal was to educate Muslim women about Islam and make them aware of their rights. Over time, however, it began morally policing women and encouraged them to support militants waging jihad in Kashmir. The group has often had to go underground after the government prohibited its activities. In 1987, the organisation became more political and demanded seats reserved for women on public transport; the government ignored their demands. When the insurgency began in 1988, DeM appealed to women to run their households and support the mujahideen.

According to Andrabi, she has stopped many young women from going to Pakistan for training in armed combat at militant camps. DeM's timeline is full of bans and arrests under the Public Safety Act. DeM can be classified as a radical religious group which uses coercion to impose a conservative version of Islam on Kashmiri women. Its moral-police initiatives primarily target what are considered centres of immorality, including cafes, restaurants and shops selling alcohol and gifts. DeM campaigns for sex segregation and strict gender role based on the five pillars of Islam. Viewing the Kashmir conflict as religious in nature, they seek the unification of J&K with Pakistan. Although DeM has not been proven to engage in direct armed struggle, Andrabi said in an interview that the women might take up arms or become suicide bombers if needed.

Organisations which share DeM's ideology promote a homogenous culture, without the liberties and choices for women which are traditionally an integral part of the Kashmiri culture. Their strict measures, such as imposition of the burqa, strengthen the patriarchal structure of Kashmiri society. According to some commentators, DeM's efforts would be more effective if directed at the creation of quotas for women in Parliament, the legislative assembly and the judiciary; female representation would increase, triggering a cultural shift in gender-role expectations.

=== Women's Self Defense Corps ===
In 1947, the volunteer Women's Self Defense Corps (WSDC) was founded as the female wing of the Jammu and Kashmir National Militia. The group's aim is "to train women for self-defense and to resist invaders". In addition to weapons training, the group also provided a forum where women "steeped in centuries-old traditions, abysmal ignorance, poverty and superstition could discuss their issues". The corps also worked at a political and cultural level for increased impact.

== Cross-border collaboration ==
Cross-border collaborations can be traced back to the beginning of conflict between India and Pakistan. Women in both countries shared a number of issues, such as public and domestic violence, rape, human-rights abuses and inequality, and the environment created by the Kashmir conflict had a negative impact. Groups and initiatives fostering cross-border collaboration created a space for the women and an atmosphere for developing human relationships and substantive dialogue on issues like the Indo-Pakistani wars.

Women's cross-border initiatives have changed and contributed to peace between India and Pakistan. It provides opportunities for face-to-face interactions and dialogue, and has facilitated much-needed understanding between the people of both countries. Women have participated in several processes through meetings with government officials and civil-society groups, addressed concerns such as education and visas, and initiated a media exchange between the countries. When only civil-society groups and government officials had the right to make decisions, groups and initiatives like this were negotiated and sustained cross-border dialogue. Women's experiences and groups are an alternative, nonviolent means of negotiating an end to conflict.

=== Women's Bus for Peace ===
In 1999, 40 Indian women of different religions and political views took a 12-hour bus trip from New Delhi to Lahore which was organized by the Women's Initiative for Peace in South Asia (WIPSA). The Women's Bus for Peace was one of many several cross-border collaborations by women from Pakistan and India. The initiative began with communication, since the women had common issues and struggles. What brought them together was the need to build strategies for peace. The Women's Bus for Peace focused on the need for communication between the people of Pakistan and India.

=== Line of Control conference ===
A November 2007 conference for Pakistani and Indian women, "Connecting Women across the Line of Control (LOC)", was held in Kashmir. Discussion topics at the conference ranged from aiding victims of violence and untreated illnesses to mobilizing women in the political and social arenas. The participants "vehemently endorsed diplomacy and peaceful negotiations in order to further the India–Pakistan peace process; withdrawal of forces from both sides of the LOC; decommissioning of militants; rehabilitation of Kashmiri Pandits to rebuild the syncretic fabric of Kashmiri society; and rehabilitation of detainees". Regardless of ethnicity, the women worked together to find solutions to problems caused by the Kashmir conflict and end the decades-long feud.

== See also ==
- Human rights abuses in Jammu and Kashmir
- Pragaash band controversy
