= Tariq Bhat =

Indian Kashmiri Writer and Director

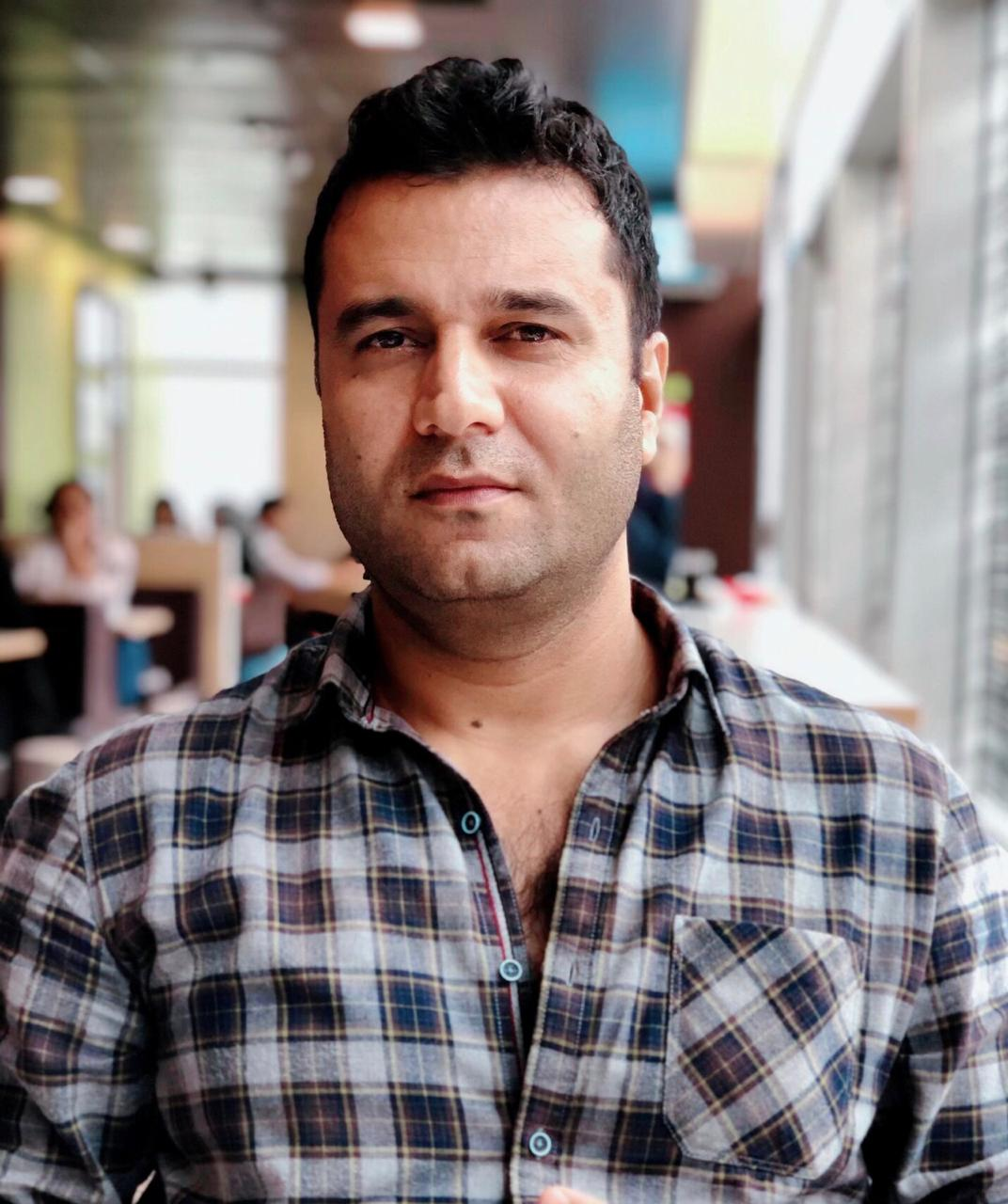
- Born: Tariq Bhat; 15 March 1979 (age 47); Sopore, Jammu and Kashmir
- Occupations: Writer and Director
- Years active: 2009-present
- Known for: Welcome to Kashmir and Hum Sab Ullu Hain
- Spouse: Niharika Tariq Bhat
- Children: Rehan Tariq Bhat
- Parents: Gulam Nabi Bhat (father); Faza Nabi Bhat (mother)

Tariq Bhat (born 15 March 1979) is an Indian Kashmiri Writer and Director who predominantly works in Bollywood cinema. He is known for his movie, Welcome to Kashmir which was released in Jammu and Kashmir theatres. He is also the director of Zindagi Tumse released in 2019.

== Filmography ==
=== Films ===
- Welcome to Kashmir (2023) as Director
- Zindagi Tumse (2019) Director
- Hum Sab Ullu Hain (2015) as Director
- Evil Dead is Back (2021) as Director

=== TV Series ===
- Daasi (2021) as Director
- Five as Same (2021) as Director

=== Songs ===
- Naina Bawre (2020) as Director
- Ek Pyaar Ka Nagma Hai (2019) as Director
- Dard Kam Nahi Hota (2018) as Director
- Dil Jigar Nazar (2018) as Director
- Good For You (2018) as Director
- Kabhi Kabhi (2017) as Director

His movie Welcome to Kashmir was the first ever Kashmiri Produced movie in India.
