= Mir Sarwar =

Indian actor

- Occupations: Actor, writer, director and producer
- Known for: Bajrangi Bhaijaan, Hai Tujhe Salaam India

Mohammad Sarwar Mir is an Indian actor who appears in Hindi films. He is known for his roles in films such as Kesari, Bajrangi Bhaijaan, and Jolly LLB 2.

== Career ==
Born in a Kashmiri family, Sarwar started his career with directors M. K. Raina and Bapi Bose in Delhi. He was part of three National School of Drama workshops. He moved to Mumbai permanently in late 2014, before being cast in two high-profile films, Bajrangi Bhaijaan (2015) and Phantom (2015). In the former, he played the father of the lost Pakistani girl Shahida, who is guided by Salman Khan's character back to Pakistan.

Sarwar also worked on the production of Kashmir Daily, a self-financed Kashmiri film venture. He is involved in making Kashmiri films and contributes to the industry's projects without charging a fee in order to encourage film making among local residents. Mir has recently directed the film BED NO.17 in Srinagar and the film will be screened in several film festivals. In 2017, Sarwar worked on the production of Mani Ratnam's Tamil film Kaatru Veliyidai and shot for the film in Hyderabad and Ladakh. He successfully auditioned for the film, with date clashes meaning he opted out of his role in Naam Shabana for the opportunity.

Kedarnath was released on 7 December 2018. In 2019 he appeared in the films Kesari, Notebook and Hamid. After Kesari, Panipat, Chanakya, Jai Hind and some web series like The Family Man, Bard of Blood, Bhram and Special Ops released.

Sarwar played the protagonist in Half Widow, Kashmir Daily, and Lihaaf. He played the negative lead in Dharma Productions' Kesari (2019). Recently Sarwar wrote and directed the prayer song "Ya Khuda" in the COVID-19 lockdown, which had most of the veteran actors on J&K.

== Filmography ==
=== Films ===
Year	Title	Role	Language	Notes
2015	Bajrangi Bhaijaan	Rauf	Hindi	
2015	Phantom	Sajid Mir	Hindi	
2016	Dishoom	Hadeed	Hindi	
2016	Dil Patang		Hindi	
2017	Jolly LLB 2	Inspector Baig	Hindi	
2017	Jagga Jasoos	Shooter	Hindi	
2017	Kaatru Veliyidai	Muzaffar Khan	Tamil	
2017	Daddy	Samaad Khan	Hindi	
2017	Poster Boys		Hindi	
2017	Ittefaq		Hindi	
2017	2016 The End	Michael / Kashmiri	Hindi	
2017	Bose: Dead/Alive	Rehmat Khan/Talwar	English, Hindi	
2018	Kashmir Daily	Hussain Durrani	Hindi	
2018	Half Widow	Khalid	Urdu	
2018	Aiyaary	Lt.Col Hari Nath	Hindi	
2018	Bioscopewala	Zadran	Hindi	
2018	Gaalib	Nazir Ahmed	Hindi	
2018	Vishwaroop II		Hindi	
2018	Vishwaroopam II		Tamil	
2018	Lateef to Laden	Crush India	Hindi	
2018	Kedarnath	Bashir	Hindi	
2019	Kesari	Khan Masud	Hindi	
2019	Hamid	Abbass	Hindi	
2019	Notebook	Imran's father	Hindi	
2019	Panipat	Imad-ul-Mulk	Hindi	
2019	Jai Hind		Bhojpuri	
2019	Chanakya	Abdul Salim	Telugu	
2020	Pawan Putra		Bhojpuri	
2020	Laxmii	Abdul Chacha	Hindi	
2020	Vanguard	Kalasu	English, Mandarin, Arabic	
2021	State of Siege: Temple Attack	Bilal Naikoo	Hindi	
2021	Shershaah	Hyder	Hindi	
2022	Hai Tujhe Salaam India	Pradhan	Hindi	
2023	Mission Majnu	A.Q.Khan	Hindi	
2023	Lafzon Mein Pyaar	Narendra	Hindi	
2023	Samara	Ramanujam	Malayalam	
2023	Hukus Bukus	Coach Khalid	Hindi	
2024	Phullwanti	Badshah	Marathi	
2025	Hari Hara Veera Mallu	Jatt King	Telugu	
2025	Songs of Paradise	Bashir	Hindi	
2025	Baramulla	Ansari	Hindi	
2026	Ustaad Bhagat Singh	Afzal Baghdadi	Telugu	
2026	Raja Shivaji	Randaula Khan	Marathi, Hindi	

=== Television ===
Year	Title	Role
2018	Bose: Dead/Alive	Rehmat Khan/Bhagat Singh
2019	The Family Man	Faizan
2019	Bhram	Elder Yakub
2020	Special OPS	Hamid
2024	Ranneeti: Balakot & Beyond	Hammad Wadhera
2025	Black Warrant	Maqbool Bhatt
2025	Tanaav	Idris Lone
