= Saanjh =

Indian 2017 Himachali Language drama film

- Directed by: Ajay K Saklanni
- Written by: Ajay K Saklanni
- Produced by: Ajay K Saklanni
- Starring: Aditi Charak; Vishal Parpagga; Asif Basra; Taranjit Kaur; Rupeshwari Sharma
- Cinematography: Ajay K Saklanni
- Edited by: Ajay K Saklanni, Manwar Rana
- Music by: Gaurav Guleria
- Production company: Enoxx Entertainment
- Distributed by: Enoxx Entertainment
- Release date: 14 April 2017
- Running time: 109 Minutes
- Country: India
- Language: Himachali

Saanjh (Dusk) is a 2017 Indian Himachali Language drama film directed and produced by Ajay K Saklanni. The film features Aditi Charak, Vishal Parpagga, and Rupeshwari Sharma in the lead roles, while Asif Basra and Taranjit Kaur play supporting roles. This film received the best feature film award in the Borrego Springs Film Festival 2017 and the Award of Merit in the Accolade Global Film Competition, November 2016. Saanjh marks the debut of producer and director, Ajay K Saklanni, who, through this movie attempts to bring to the fore the lesser known Himachali language and tries to revive the almost forgotten Tankri Script. Saanjh is the first feature film to have been made and released in the Western Himalayan/ Pahari language or Western Pahari. Shot in several picturesque locations in and around the Kullu Valley including Shangarh, Parvati Valley, Great Himalayan National Park and Rohtang Pass, Parashar Lake in Mandi and also in Lahaul and Spiti Valley.

== Plot ==
Set in the beautiful Kullu valley in Himachal Pradesh, Saanjh follows the journey of a 16-year-old girl from Chandigarh named Saanjh (Sanju), who becomes the victim of cyber crime. Instead of supporting his daughter, her father sends her away to their ancestral home in a remote village to live with her grandmother. Isolated and dejected, Sanju is unable to cope up with the village life where she encounters an imbecile house guest, Jonga, with whom she has a rough start. As time passes, however, she finds solace in his company and with him hatches a plan to raise just enough money to escape from the village and return to her home in the city. Meanwhile, Sanju gradually begins to understand her grandmother's pain of living a secluded life and they bond over being ostracised by the man who failed to be a good son and father at the same time.

== Cast ==
- Aditi Charak as Sanju
- Vishal Parpagga as Jonga
- Rupeshwari Sharma as Dadi
- Asif Basra as Shamsher
- Taranjit Kaur as Sanju's Mother

== Production ==
The production of Saanjh film begun in July 2015 and was completed by November 2016. The film was submitted to various film festivals across the world. Saanjh was officially selected for Borrego Springs Film Festival 2017 where the film won the Best Feature Film Award. The film also bagged Award of Merit in The Accolade Global Film Competition November 2016. Saanjh film was officially selected for Los Angeles International Women's Film Festival 2017 and Cinema on the Bayou Film Festival, Louisiana 2017.

== Music ==
Saanjh

Soundtrack album by Gaurav Guleria
- Released: March 2017
- Recorded: 2016
- Studio: Enoxx Music
- Genre: Feature film soundtrack
- Length: 26:18
- Language: Himachali
- Label: Enoxx Music

The film's music was composed by Gaurav Guleria, vocals by Mohit Chauhan, Pavithra Chari and Gaurav Guleria.

Track listing
No.	Title	Singer(s)	Length
1.	"Dheeme Dheeme"	Pavithra Chari	5:38
2.	"Deva Mere"	Mohit Chauhan	4:20
3.	"Dil Jo Kahe"	Pavithra Chari, Gaurav Guleria	4:00
4.	"Puchhe Amma Meri"	Mohit Chauhan	5:05
5.	"Saanjh"	Pavithra Chari	3:11
6.	"Deva Mere (Reprise)" (Reprise)	Gaurav Guleria	4:04
Total length:			26:18
