= Half-widow =

Half-widow is a term given to Kashmiri Muslim women whose husbands are currently missing who have likely been abducted or detained and have been missing in the ongoing conflict in Kashmir. These women are referred to as "half-widows" because they have no idea whether their husbands are alive or dead.

Thousands of people in Kashmir have disappeared during the conflict.

Most of the half-widows have not remarried due to doubt about their husband's fate and a lack of consensus among Muslim scholars on the issue. In Kashmir, a group of religious scholars issued a fatwa on the 26 of December 2013 saying that half-widows are allowed to remarry after a waiting period of four years.
