= Raj Begum =

Indian singer (1927–2016)

- راج بیگم
- Born: Raj Begum; March 27, 1927; Srinagar, Jammu and Kashmir, British India
- Died: October 26, 2016 (aged 89); Srinagar, Jammu and Kashmir, India
- Occupation: Singer
- Years active: 1950s–1986
- Known for: Kashmiri folk and light classical singing; "Nightingale of Kashmir"
- Children: 3
- Awards: Padma Shri (2002); Sangeet Natak Akademi Award (2013)

Raj Begum (27 March 1927 – 26 October 2016) was an Indian playback and folk singer from Kashmir. She was often called the "Nightingale" or "Melody Queen" of Kashmir. She popularised Kashmiri poetic traditions, and received the Padma Shri in 2002 and the Sangeet Natak Akademi Award in 2013.

== Early life ==
Raj Begum was born in Srinagar on 27 March 1927 and raised in a modest household where her father encouraged her musical talent from an early age. She began singing at weddings across communities, where she learned Kashmiri folk fundamentals.

== Career and impact ==
She was introduced to Radio Kashmir Srinagar in the early 1950s and formally joined in 1954, soon becoming one of the station’s defining live voices. She sang in the styles of folk, classical, ghazal, devotional, and romantic songs, with inspiration from Kashmiri poetic traditions.

Along with contemporary Naseem Akhtar, Raj Begum helped dismantle social taboos around women singing publicly in Kashmir, opening doors for later generations of women artists on stage and radio. She retired in 1986.

== Selected songs ==
- Wesye Gulan Aavay Bahar (also cited as “Vyasiye gulan aavuy bahar”)
- Mashraev Thas (Janane Tse Kar Yaad)
- Rum Gaem Sheshas Begur Gov Ban Myun
- Dil Tsooran Hai, Dil Nivum Shaman
- Walo Wawo Woney Soz
- Kya Kya Wony A Dost, Kam Kam Sitam
- Tse Patte Rawwrawem
- Husnas Tse Folwun Roozny

== Awards and honours ==
- Padma Shri (Arts), Government of India, 2002.
- Sangeet Natak Akademi Award (Music), 2013, recognising lifetime contributions to Kashmiri vocal music.

== Death ==
She died on 26 October 2016 in Srinagar at the age of 89, reportedly at her daughter’s residence in Chanapora, after a period of illness. Tributes from artists and officials hailed her as a cultural icon who gave voice to Kashmiri heritage across seven decades.

== Film and playback ==
Beyond radio and concert work, she has been associated with playback for the Kashmiri feature film Mehjoor, aligning her voice with cinematic interpretations of Kashmiri poetry; formal catalogs of her film songs remain limited in public sources.

The 2025 film Songs of Paradise follows the journey of a Kashmiri woman who dreams of becoming a singer, inspired by the songs of Raj Begum.

== See also ==
Radio Kashmir Srinagar
