= Kashmir Daily =

2017 film

- Poster of Kashmir Daily
- Directed by: Hussein Khan
- Written by: Hussein Khan
- Produced by: Hussein Khan
- Starring: Mir Sarwar, Neelam Singh, Sanam Ziya, Rajinder Tickoo, Hussein Khan, Zameer Ashai
- Music by: Raja Bilal
- Production companies: Seven two creations and Safdar Arts
- Release dates: March 2017 (SKICC Srinagar); 7 January 2018
- Running time: 148 minutes
- Country: India
- Language: Hindi

Kashmir Daily is a Hindi-language social drama film produced and directed by Kashmiri filmmaker Hussein Khan under the banner of his own production house Seven Two Creations in Association with Safdar Arts. The film was first screened at SKICC Srinagar in March 2017. The film was released on 5 January 2018 and was shown in several cities of India in PVR Cinemas. It is the 1st Film from Kashmir which will be released throughout India.

== Synopsis ==
The 145-minute-long film stars Mir Sarwar, Neelam Singh, Sanam Ziya, Rajinder Tickoo, Hussein Khan and Zameer Ashai. It focuses on drug abuse and the peak of unemployment in Jammu and Kashmir.

== Cast ==
- Mir Sarwar as Hussein Durrani
- Neelam Singh as Pooja
- Sanam Ziya as Zoya
- Rajinder Tickoo as Gul Khan
- Hussein Khan As Hyder Durrani
