= Danish Renzu =

Film director

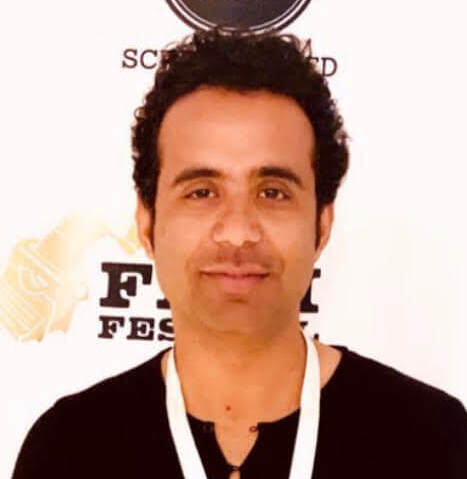
- Renzu in 2024
- Born: 11 March 1989 (age 37); Srinagar, J&K, India
- Education: UCLA (B.E.E.)
- Occupations: Director; screenwriter; producer
- Notable work: Half Widow, The illegal, Songs of Paradise

Danish Renzu is an Indian-American film director, producer, and screenwriter, based in Los Angeles, California. He is also the founder of Renzu Films. Renzu is best known for directing and producing films like Half Widow, The Illegal, and Songs of Paradise featuring Saba Azad, Soni Razdan, Taaruk Raina, Lillete Dubey, which released worldwide one Prime Video on August 29, 2025.

Renzu has received numerous accolades, his film The illegal as a writer and director was shortlisted for nominations for the Best Picture Category at the Academy Awards 2019. Renzu is also one of the writers of the show Real Kashmir Football Club (TV series) which is nominated under Best Series at Emmy Awards 2026.

== Early life and education ==
Danish Renzu was born on 11 March 1989 in Srinagar, in the Kashmir Valley of the erstwhile Indian state of Jammu and Kashmir, into a Kashmiri Muslim family. In 2005, he moved to the United States for college, studying at the University of California, Los Angeles. He holds a Bachelor of Electrical Engineering degree and UCLA Extension Writers' Program certification in screenwriting from the same university. He worked at AT&T for five years before he made the drastic career change.

== Career ==
Renzu started directing short movies in 2015. He directed two short films In Search of America, Inshallah (2014) and First Love (2015). His first feature film Half Widow was released in 2017 and narrates the story of a woman searching for her husband against the backdrop of the Kargil War. His second directorial film was The illegal (2019) starring Suraj Sharma of Oscar-winning film Life of Pi, Shweta Tripathi, and Adil Hussain. The film was shortlisted for nominations for the Best Picture Category at the Academy Awards 2019.

He also directed and produced the music video Ae Savere starring Soni Razdan and Taha Shah Badussha which traces a life of a Kashmiri Pandit woman returning to Kashmir. It was very well received. His recent award-winning short films The Good News and My Father's Doctor are both streaming on JioCinema.

His film Songs of Paradise released in August 2025 produced by Excel Entertainment.

Recently Renzu announced his Music label, Renzu Music representing many Kashmiri artists with an intention to create a platform for artists in the valley.

== Filmography ==
Year	Film	Director	Writer	Producer	Notes
2025	Songs of Paradise	✓	✓	✓	
2025	Real Kashmir Football Club (TV series)		✓		
2021	The Illegal	✓	✓	✓	
2017	Half Widow	✓	✓	✓	

== Awards and recognition ==
Awards and recognition
Year	Award	Category	Work	Result	Ref.
2026	International Iconic Awards	Best Film	Songs of Paradise	Nominated	
2026	Screenwriters Association India Awards	Best Screenplay-Screenwriters Association Award	Real Kashmir Football Club (TV series)	Nominated	
2026	E4M Streaming Media Awards	Best Writer/Script Writer /Screenplay- Series	Real Kashmir Football Club (TV series)	Special mention	
2025	Jagran Film Festival	Best Film- OTT Film	Songs of Paradise	Won	
2026	Screen Awards	Best Script – OTT Film (Screen Award)	Songs of Paradise	Nominated	
2026	Indian Streaming Academy Awards	Best Director (Web Original Hindi)	Songs of Paradise	Nominated	
2021	Austin Film Festival	Best Feature Film and Best Director	The illegal	Nominated	
2019	Mumbai International Film Festival (MIFF)	Jury Special Prize	The illegal	Won	
2018	New Jersey International Festival	Best Feature Film (Grand Prize)	The illegal	Won	
2017	South Asian Film Festival	Best Feature (Audience Award)	The illegal	Won	
