= Welcome to Kashmir =

- Directed by: Tariq Bhat
- Written by: Tariq Bhat and Ashpak Mujawar
- Produced by: Niharika Tariq and Filmstock Creations
- Starring: Mateena Rajput, Ahmad Shahab
- Music by: Ishfaq Kawa and Javed Ali
- Production company: Filmstock Creations
- Distributed by: Filmstock Creations
- Release date: 26 May 2023
- Running time: 120 minutes
- Country: India
- Language: Hindi

Welcome To Kashmir is an Indian Hindi-language thriller film directed by Tariq Bhat and produced by Filmstock Creations. It stars local actors, Mateena Rajput, Ahmad Shahab, Simran Ahuja, Niharika Tariq and Rehan Tariq. It was released on 26 May 2023. It is known to be first Bollywood film which stars actors from Kashmir.

== Cast ==
- Mateena Rajput as Naina
- Ahmad Shahab as Zulfi
- Rehan Tariq as Young Zulfi
- Simran Ahuja as Simran
- Hussein Khan as Baba
- Mohini Agarwal as Haya
- Aijaz Dar Sagar as Mir

== Release ==
The film was released on 26 May 2023. It got a great response in Srinagar.
