= Bachelor of Electrical Engineering =

Undergraduate academic degree

Bachelor of Electrical Engineering (B.E.E. or BEE) is an undergraduate academic degree offered to a student who completes three to five years of study in electrical engineering at a university or college.

There are many institutes offering Bachelor of Science in Electrical Engineering (B.S.E.E. or B.Sc.E.E.) or Bachelor of Engineering in Electrical Engineering (B.E.E.E.).

== Duration ==
Program duration varies throughout the world depending upon the education curriculum. For example, in the US, this course requires four years to complete. On the other hand, in the UK, it takes three years to complete.

In some countries, it takes five years to complete. Study topics normally covered in this course include Direct Current, Alternating Current, Electrical Machines, AC & DC Motors, Transformers, Generators, Rotating Devices, Power Engineering, Power Transmission and Power Distribution.
