= The Illegal (film) =

- Film poster
- Directed by: Danish Renzu
- Written by: Danish Renzu; Sunayana Kachroo (hindi dialogues)
- Produced by: Danish Renzu; Tara Tucker
- Starring: Suraj Sharma; Shweta Tripathi; Adil Hussain; Iqbal Theba; Jay Ali; Hannah Masi; Neelima Azeem
- Cinematography: Antonio Cisneros
- Edited by: Hassan Hassandoost; Angela Latimer
- Music by: Eric Neveux
- Production companies: Renzu Films; Tucker Hess Productions
- Distributed by: Amazon Prime Video
- Release dates: June 2019 (Mumbai International Film Festival); 21 March 2021
- Running time: 86 minutes
- Country: United States
- Language: English

The Illegal is a 2019 Indian American English-language drama film written and directed by Danish Renzu. The film is produced by Tara Tucker, and Danish Renzu. Starring Suraj Sharma, Iqbal Theba and Shweta Tripathi in the lead roles, it is a story about a young film school student from middle-class India who is forced to drop out to support his family while staying in the United States as an undocumented worker. The Illegal premiered at the 2019 Austin Film Festival under the official feature narrative section.

== Plot ==
The movie starts with Hassan (Suraj Sharma) recording farewell messages from his family - (Adil Hussain), (Neelima Azeem) and friends using his video camera. The last person he attempts many times to record is his sister and best friend Mahi (Shweta Tripathi). Soon after, Hassan heads to America in order to study at one of the top universities so that he can eventually become a director and whilst there he will stay with his mother's brother and their family.

Upon his arrival, he is greeted by his uncle (Mamujaan) and is taken to his house where he is welcomed by his aunt (Maamijaan) and cousins. Whilst settling in, he overhears Maamijaan questioning Mamujaan on how Hassan's father was able to afford such an expensive college and insists that he make alternative arrangements as their house is too small and their financial situation is so bad that they would not be able to accommodate another person for free. Whilst outside, Mamujaan proceeds to question Hassan about his schooling to which he explains that he took a loan and will pay it back by getting a job as his father is sickly and cannot manage such a huge debt. Mamujaan lectures him about his career choice and that he should be leaning towards an engineering degree in order to help his family financially. Hassan then asks Mamujaan how they are managing financially to which he explains that despite what people in India believe, living in America is not as easy as it seems and even though he has lived America for many years, he still struggles financially. Hassan expresses that he should have told everyone the truth as they (he and his family) were all relying on him for Hassan's accommodation as living on campus is very expensive. Mamujaan explains that he can stay for a while until he manages to find something but Hassan refuses and leaves the next day.

Hassan wanders from place to place looking for accommodation and a job, to no avail. He eventually lands in front of an Indian restaurant called "New Delhi Cafe" owned by Khan (Jay Ali). He is spotted outside by Babaji (Iqbal Theba) who provides him with food and water. He insists that he meets their boss who will definitely help him. Khan meets with Hassan and explains that he will help him by paying for all of his living expenses but in turn he will need to work hard, he will have no right over his tips and will need to work full-time. Owing to his current circumstance, he agrees but does not reveal the truth about his job to his parents since they already dislike Mamujaan for not accommodating him as per their initial agreement.

Hassan begins attends his orientation day at college and as a result ends up late for his first day. He is reprimanded by Khan for being late and entering through the front door as if he is a guest. He has a difficult few weeks trying to fulfill his studying journey at college and working a full-time job – struggling to ensure that he masters both. At the same time, Hassan films the workers at the restaurant (besides Gustavo due to his arrogant ways) and begins to form a close relationship with Babaji.

One day, he meets Jessica at the restaurant and they start spending time with one another. Eventually they fall in love and start dating. However, due to his time at work Hassan's studies are affected and he begins hiding his books in order to study whenever he can. He also fails one of his screenplays and as a result has to resubmit it again. Khan begins to suspect that Hassan is up to something and starts assuming that he is stealing money. When Gustavo and Hassan have an altercation in the kitchen over an incorrect meal order, Khan fires Hassan instantly and tells him to never come back. Hassan leaves work, packs his belongings and heads out to find alternative arrangements. Back in India, his father suffers with his health and the family agrees not to tell Hassan as they do not want him to worry and it will affect his studies. Hassan stays in a Mosque and attends his classes. However, Hassan is faced with financial pressure again when his semester fees are not paid for and as a result he tries to find another job to no avail. He eventually gets a job as a general assistant and somehow everything seems to be falling in to place.

Tragedy strikes when Hassan receives a call from Mahi who mentions that their father collapsed and requires an emergency operation which the family cannot afford. He is eventually forced to seek help from Khan out of desperation as he is the only person Hassan knows that will provide a loan to an immigrant. Hassan drops out of college and begins working full-time at New Delhi Cafe, depressed and forgetting about the life he once knew. One day, he sees Mamujaan and Maamijaan in the restaurant. They are surprised to find him working there and out of guilt ask him to come back to their house to live. He refuses and gives them their meal on the house. At the same time, Jessica arrives after attempting to contact him for several days. Hassan tells her that they live completely different lives and she will never understand which results in them breaking up.

Hassan gets a letter for his visa stating that he would have to leave the country due to him abandoning his studies. He feels helpless and is at a loss due to his situation. Hassan then finds out that Babaji has a daughter named Geeta back in India whom he has not seen since arriving in America over 20 years ago due to him owing Khan's father (and now Khan) a high amount of money. It is also revealed that Khan has Babaji's passport and refused to send him back as promised initially due to a lack of finances. Hassan tries to make Babaji feel better by setting up a video call session with Geeta whom he is overjoyed to see but the next day he feels ill and eventually dies in his sleep. Hassan discovers this after another altercation with Gustav when he catches Gustav stealing money and realizes he was the one at fault all this time.

The film fast forwards five years and it is revealed that Hassan's father is fully recovered and dancing with his mother at Mahi's wedding however Hassan is not amongst them but has paid for everything in full which is probably due to a loan from Khan. As Hassan narrates the final scene, he sees another student enter the restaurant which reminds him of his past and he realizes the vicious cycle immigrants are forced into. The film ends on a hopeful note with Hassan completing his story in his journal.

In the post credits scene, Hassan's recordings are shown from when he first started at Cafe New Delhi with each co-worker sharing their story about how they ended up working in the restaurant.

== Cast ==
- Suraj Sharma as Hassan
- Shweta Tripathi as Mahi
- Adil Hussain as Papa
- Neelima Azeem as Mummy
- Jay Ali as Khan
- Iqbal Theba as Babaji

== Reception ==
Gillian Gaar of Book and film globe wrote: "It’s a sympathetic portrayal of people who came to America in search of a better life, only to have things go horribly wrong because of the vagaries of fate. Sharma, Renzu’s first choice for the role of Hassan, is perfectly cast, full of the idealism and naivety of youth." Danish Renzu's The Illegal was given the Special Award for Discovering India at Mumbai International Film Festival, in Association with Turkish Airlines, by section curator Uma Da Cunha and film critics Mike Cahill and Namrata Joshi. The film was listed as top 10 films to watch at Mumbai International Film Festival 2019. by Rediff Donna Coplean of Texas Art and Film wrote: "It’s entertaining, moving, suspenseful, and with characters, viewers will come to care for and appreciate." The film was also listed on CBS Austin Best Bets. The film also had a signature screening at Asian World Film Festival in Los Angeles. The film garnered 1.8 million views in its first three days of its release on Amazon Prime in India.

== Awards ==
- Special Award for Discovering India, Mumbai International film Festival, 2019
- Best Feature Critics Choice, Vancouver South Asian Film Festival, 2019
- (Nominated) Best Feature Narrative, Austin Film Festival, 2019
- Best Film Jury Mention, DC South Asian Film Festival, 2019
- Best Feature Audience Award, DC South Asian Film Festival, 2019
- (Nominated) Best Feature, Pasadena International Film Festival, 2020

== Festivals ==
2019

- Mumbai International Film Festival, Mumbai
- Austin Film Festival, Austin
- Asian World Film Festival, Los Angeles
- Tasveer South Asian Film Festival, Seattle
- DC South Asian Film Festival, Washington DC
- South Asian International Film Festival, New York
- Vancouver South Asian International Film Festival, Vancouver

2020

- Seattle Asian Film Festival, Seattle
- Pasadena International Film Festival, Pasadena
- San Luis Obispo Film Festival, San Luis Obispo
- Sunscreen Film Festival, Florida
- UK Asian Film Festival, London
