= Pragaash =

- Origin: Jammu and Kashmir, India
- Genres: Rock, pop
- Years active: 10 December 2012 – 29 February 2013

Pragaash (Kashmiri: پرَٛگاش, prāgāsh — «moonshine») was an Indian all-female rock band consisting of three Kashmiri Muslim girls- Noma Nazir Bhatt, Aneeqa Khalid and Farah Deeba. The band was formed in December 2012 and received controversy from Islamic scholars, who claimed that the band members allegedly broke the codes of Islam. The band members all received threats of death, rape, and other physical harm, as well as a fatwa from the Grand Mufti of India's Kashmir, which prompted them to quit the band.

== History ==
The band made their first public appearance on 10 December 2012 when they participated in a Battle of Bands competition in Srinagar, India, where they received the award for "Best Performance".

=== Death threats ===
Shortly after their win at the Battle of Bands, the group began to receive death and rape threats via their cell phones and Facebook profiles. The Grand Mufti publicly criticized the band, stating that they were exhibiting "indecent behaviour" and that "this kind of non-serious activity can become the first step towards our destruction". On 3 February 2013 he issued a fatwa against the group, stating that music was "not good for society" and that all of the "bad things happening in the Indian society are because of music". Later that same month the police registered a First Information Report against the online attackers and Chief Minister Omar Abdullah ordered a probe in the matter. In February 2013 three people were taken into custody and arrested for "promoting enmity between classes" and "criminal intimidation".

The band has received a large amount of global online support. The group initially received expressions of support and offers of security for the band from Chief Minister Omar Abdullah via Twitter, but he later deleted his tweets.

== Band members ==
- Noma Nazir Bhatt, Vocals and guitar
- Farah Deeba, Drums
- Aneeqa Khalid, Bass guitar

== Popular culture ==
A authorized docu-drama, PRAGAASH (the song of silence) has been made on this Pragaash band by Marijuana Films. Written and directed by Janmejay Singh, it contains the interviews of Noma and Judges along with Adnan and famous music personalities of Jammu and Kashmir.

The band is cited in Marlon James's Man Booker Prize winning novel A Brief History of Seven Killings as "First Ray of Light".

== See also ==
- Women's rights in Jammu and Kashmir
