= Sunayana Kachroo =

Indian-American writer and poet

- Born: Jammu and Kashmir, India
- Education: University of Pune
- Occupations: Poet; lyricist
- Awards: Best Lyricist Award for Ae Savere

Sunayana Kachroo is an Indian-American poet, film-writer, lyricist and a columnist.

== Education ==
Sunayana Kachroo was born and raised in Kashmir, India into a Kashmiri Pandit family. She received her education in Jammu and Kashmir and Maharashtra, and earned a master’s in computer science from Savitribai Phule Pune University in Pune. Her father, Chaman Kachroo, was also a poet known for his Urdu Nazm titled Charcha.

== Career ==
In 2000, Sunayana moved to the US and began working as an analyst in New York City. Her first book, Waqt Se Pare- Beyond Time, was published in 2013.

She has also written lyrics for songs sung by artists like Sonu Nigam, Shankar Mahadevan, Ali Sethi, Sunidhi Chauhan, Hariharan, Harshdeep Kaur, Rashmeet Kaur, Anuradha Palakurthi, Jasraj Joshi, Hrishikesh Ranade, and Archana Kamath.

Sunayana developed an interest in poetry at the age of 15, trying different forms like Kavita, English Poems, Nazms, and Dohe. She started as a featured poet at the South Asian Institute of Harvard in 2014 and later shared the stage with Punjabi poet Nirupama Dutt at the Bangalore Literature Festival. Since 2015, she has been a featured poet at the annual South Asian Poetry reading at Harvard University hosted by the South Asian Institute.

In 2022, she launched a new collection of poems called Sunny Side Up, which received reviews from Subhash Kak, and Lopa Banerjee, and an NFT poem named Home and Homeless, after which she was invited to the US Capitol Hill to recite her poems. Sunayana has participated in poetry shows globally and recited her poems at various venues, including Jose Mateo's Ballet Theatre, Harvard University, NECA awards, Indian Consulate NYC, Lalded Ke lal-vakh, and Hindu Heritage Day in 2015. Notable events included her poetry showcase at the U.S Capitol hill.

In 2023, she released the song Tum Kehte Ho, sung and produced by Sunidhi Chauhan.

== Work as lyricist ==
- Tum Kehte Ho
- Dil Khanjar
- Kahan Hai Tu
- Sonn Pann
- Dilbaro
- Ae Savere
- Baliye
- Kuch Baqi Hai
- Subha Dekh Li
- Pehla Qadam
- Ekal Vidhayala Theme
- Dhool Hatakar Dekha
- Yumbarzaloo
- Tu Zarra Hai

== Books ==
- Waqt Se Pare-Beyond Time (2013)
- Sunny Side Up (2022)
- Tere Jaane Key Baad

== Accolades ==
- Best Lyricist Award for Ae Savere— India International Film Festival of Boston
- Top 20 Woman of the Year— Literature Award (India New England)
- Her poem, Oh, my brown boy was featured on the National Park Services, US Government Federal Department in December 2022
