= MovieTime Cinemas =

Indian multiplex chain

Movietime Cinemas
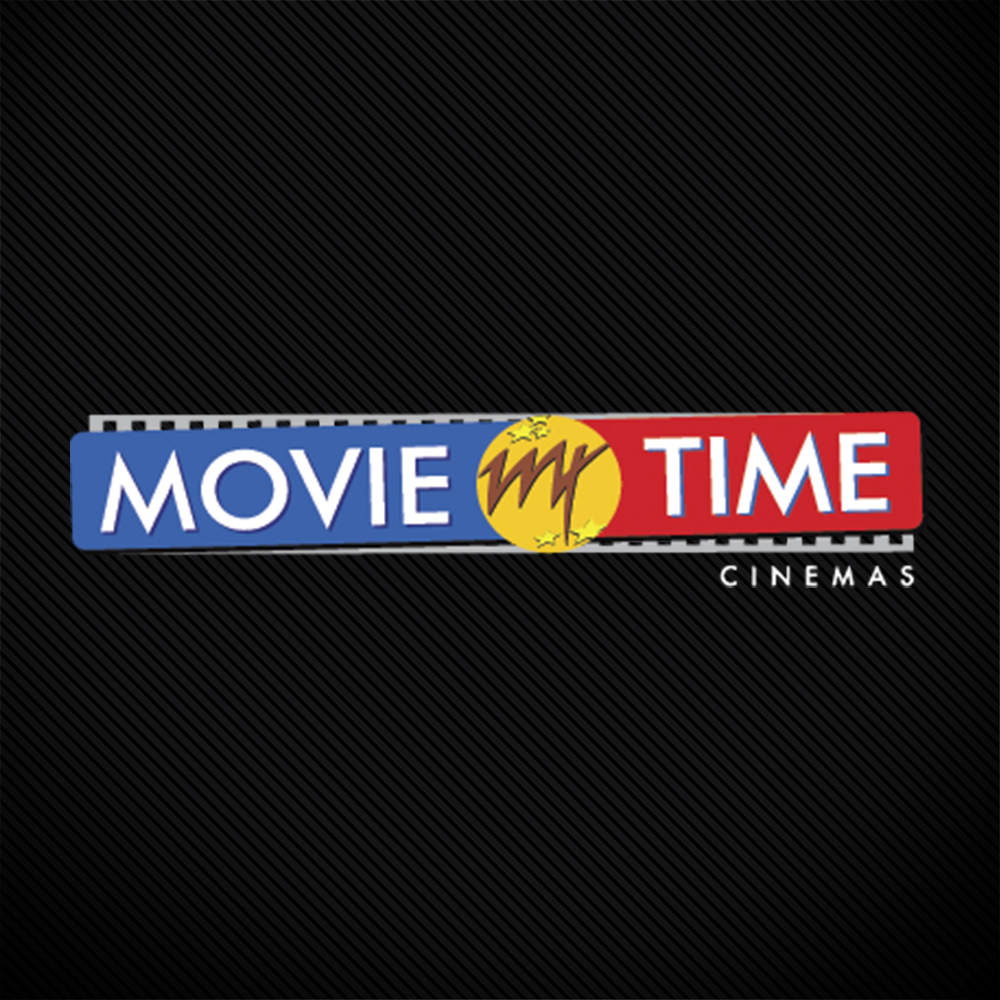
- Company type: Private
- Industry: Entertainment (movie theatres)
- Founded: 1998
- Founder: O.P. Kapur
- Headquarters: Mumbai, India
- Key people: Lalit Kapur; Arun Kapur; Anil Kapur; Ayush Kapur; Abhishek Kapur; Ankit Kapur
- Products: Movie
- Number of employees: Above 700
- Website: movietimecinemas.in

Movietime Cinemas is a multiplex chain operating multiplexes in India and Lima, Peru.
