= Happy Bhag Jayegi (soundtrack) =

Happy Bhag Jayegi (Original Motion Picture Soundtrack)

Soundtrack album by Sohail Sen
- Released: 1 August 2016
- Recorded: 2016
- Studio: YRF, Mumbai
- Genre: Feature film soundtrack
- Length: 23:12
- Language: Hindi
- Label: Eros Music

Sohail Sen chronology
Housefull 3 (2016)	Happy Bhag Jayegi (Original Motion Picture Soundtrack) (2016)	Love per Square Foot (2018)

Happy Bhag Jayegi (Original Motion Picture Soundtrack) is the soundtrack album to the 2016 film of the same name directed by Mudassar Aziz starring Diana Penty, Abhay Deol, Ali Fazal and Jimmy Sheirgill. The album featured five songs composed by Sohail Sen and lyrics written by Aziz himself. The album was released through Eros Music on 1 August 2016 to positive reviews from critics.

== Background ==
The soundtrack for Happy Bhag Jayegi was composed by music director and singer Sohail Sen. The lyrics were written by Mudassar Aziz, with the exception of the song "Gabru Ready To Mingle Hai", which features a rap segment with English lyrics written by Dee MC. Harshdeep Kaur, Shahid Mallya, Mika Singh, Neeti Mohan, Tarannum Malik, Danish Sabri, Arijit Singh, and Altamash Faridi provided vocals for the album's songs.

Sen preferred on composing albums where he would be the sole musician, instead of the multi-composer albums, which led him to sign fewer projects. Happy Bhag Jayegi is Sen's first album as a full-fledged composer, since Gunday (2014); he believed that "composing the entire soundtrack for a film helps me to show my versatility". Sen admitted that Aziz had a good taste of music, having previously written lyrics for composers such as Himesh Reshammiya and Lalit Pandit, and with the setting in Amritsar and Lahore, he had a good command of the Punjabi language. He described the album as a mix of traditional and contemporary sounds.

== Release ==
The love song "Aashiq Tera"—the first track from the album to be released—was accompanied by a music video featuring Penty, Deol, Fazal, and Sheikh. The soundtrack was released on 1 August 2016 through Eros Music.

== Critical reception ==
Commentators including Mohar Basu and Devesh Sharma positively reviewed the film's soundtrack and were appreciative of Sen's unique style. Mohar Basu, writing for The Times of India, gave the album three and a half stars out of five, said it has an "interesting mix of different styles", and dubbed it "memorable". He was particularly impressed by Singh's vocals on "Gabru Ready To Mingle Hai", which he called a "crowd pleaser". The view was shared by Sharma, who wrote that Singh sang with an "inherent panache". Writing for Filmfare, he called the album "hugely satisfying" and chose Faridi's qawwali-influenced "Aashiq Tera" as the standout track. The song was also praised by Tatsam Mukherjee of India Today, who was otherwise critical of Sen's "forgettable" work. Although impressed by the vocalists—especially Kaur and Mallya—he dismissed the mediocrity of Sen's compositions.

In his review for The Hindu, Vipin Nair chose three songs—"Happy Oye", "Aashiq Tera" and "Yaanam"—as his favorite picks and complimented the vocalists as one of the highlights. Karthik Srinivasan of Milliblog noted that the album has "a couple of good numbers here". Joginder Tuteja of Bollywood Hungama, though describing the music not to be extraordinary, he added "with a mix of romantic and dance numbers, this one plays the balancing act well and brings on a soundtrack that is just apt for the film."

== Track listing ==
All lyrics are written by Mudassar Aziz; all music is composed by Sohail Sen

Happy Bhag Jayegi (Original Motion Picture Soundtrack) track listing
No.	Title	Singer(s)	Length
1.	"Happy Oye"	Harshdeep Kaur, Shahid Mallya	4:40
2.	"Gabru Ready To Mingle Hai"	Mika Singh, Neeti Mohan, Tarannum Malik, Danish Sabri	3:46
3.	"Aashiq Tera"	Altamash Faridi	4:54
4.	"Zara Si Dosti"	Arijit Singh	5:27
5.	"Yaaram"	Javed Ali	4:25
Total length:			23:12
