= Happy Phirr Bhag Jayegi =

2018 Indian film by Muddassar Aziz

- Theatrical release poster
- Directed by: Mudassar Aziz
- Screenplay by: Mudassar Aziz
- Produced by: Aanand L. Rai; Krishika Lulla; Himanshu Sharma
- Starring: Sonakshi Sinha; Diana Penty; Jimmy Sheirgill; Ali Fazal; Piyush Mishra; Jassi Gill
- Cinematography: Sunil Patel
- Edited by: Ninad Khanolkar
- Music by: Sohail Sen
- Production companies: Colour Yellow Productions; Eros International
- Release date: 24 August 2018
- Running time: 137 minutes
- Country: India
- Language: Hindi
- Budget: ₹30 crore
- Box office: est. ₹28.06 crore

Happy Phirr Bhag Jayegi (transl. Happy will run away again; Hindi pronunciation: [pʰɪɾ bʱaːg dʒaːeːgiː]) is a 2018 Indian Hindi-language comedy film directed by Mudassar Aziz and produced by Aanand L. Rai and Krishika Lulla. The film is a sequel to the 2016 film Happy Bhag Jayegi. It stars Diana Penty as the eponymous character from the first film and Sonakshi Sinha as her namesake. The production features an ensemble cast consisting of Penty, Sinha, Jimmy Sheirgill, Piyush Mishra, Ali Fazal, Jassie Gill and Aparshakhi Khhurana, with Sheirgill, Mishra and Fazal reprising their roles. The film was released on 24 August 2018 to mixed reviews from critics.

== Plot ==
Daman Singh Bagga the corporator and Usman Afridi the near-retirement cop are shown to be kidnapped by some Chinese goons and brought to Shanghai, China. A flashback reveals that Bagga's former fiancée, Harpreet "Happy" Kaur and her husband and lover Guddu went to Shanghai for a concert. However, at the same time, botany professor Harpreet "Happy" Kaur also comes to Shanghai to join a university as a lecturer. At the airport, the Chinese goons kidnapped Happy 2, mistaking her for Happy 1. They took Happy 2 into custody and demanded a contract as ransom. The contract is revealed to have actually been given to their rivals by senior Pakistani politician Javed Ahmed and his son Bilal Ahmed, who they wanted to blackmail into giving them the contract. Happy 2 was unable to convince them of her identity and that they have got the wrong 'Happy'.

One of the goons, Chang, did not believe Happy 2. Left with no other options, he abducted Bagga from his wedding ceremony in Amritsar and Usman from his farewell ceremony in Lahore. Back in the present, Chang tells Bagga and Afridi to convince Happy 2 to do what they want her to do and convince Bilal into handing over the contract to them, but she runs away. Meanwhile, Happy 1 and Guddu end up at the university and are asked to join the orientation programme. Clueless, they join the orientation and roam around the city. Meanwhile, Happy 2 hides in a bar where she met Khushwant Singh Gill a.k.a. Khushi who works in the Indian embassy. She hides in his car, but is discovered and explains her entire story; upon listening, Khushi is initially reluctant but finally agrees. He takes Happy 2 to his house. The next day, he takes her to his office to meet his boss Adnan Chow, a half-Pakistani, half-Chinese man. Adnan assures Happy 2 that he will help her. Meanwhile, Chang finds Happy's location and goes there with Bagga and Usman, though when the goons finally catch hold of Happy 2, Bagga and Usman are confused since this is not the Happy they know.

They then go to Khushi's house and Chang arrives there. Happy 2 hits Chang and he goes unconscious. Bagga and Usman decide to join Happy 2 and Khushi. They go to meet FAQ, Khushi's friend. They find out that, aside from joining the university, Happy 2 also came to find her eloped fiancée Aman Singh Wadhwa who abandoned her two years ago. She asks them to avoid falling into the situation, but Khushi and the other decide to help her anyway. They seek Adnan's help in getting Aman's location only to find out that he does not live there anymore. Chang catches up with them and attacks them but they manage to escape. Both Khushi and Bagga fall for Happy 2 and challenge each other to see who can win her heart. FAQ meets Happy 1 and Guddu but does not recognise them. Happy 2 and the others find out that Chang works for Adnan, who was the mastermind behind this whole kidnapping as he wanted the contract from Bilal. Happy 2 and the others also find out that Aman is in jail, so they plan to meet him there but end up getting caught. They are later released after an explanation and finally go to meet Aman, and upon arrival witness him dancing dressed as a female in front of the other prisoners, only to find out he is gay and is in prison just to be with his boyfriend. Happy 2 makes Aman realise his mistake and he agrees to apologize to her father about what he had done to her and her family.

Chang finally realises that Happy 2 is not the one he was looking for. Later that night, he kidnaps her again anyway with unexpected help from the extremely drunk Bagga and Usman. The next morning, Khushi receives a call from Adnan who tells him he has kidnapped Happy 2 to help him motivate himself into bringing him Happy 1. Khushi feels helpless, but Bagga suggests that they arrange a concert to find Guddu. Aman takes responsibility to promote the event and FAQ arranges the concert. On they day of the concert, Guddu and Happy 1 show up and they explain the situation to them. Guddu is not ready to help them but Happy 1 agrees as she believes that she is responsible for what's going on. Meanwhile, Happy 2 runs away from Adnan's custody. Unbeknownst to them, Khushi and the others go to meet Adnan and his men. But Khushi understands what's going on an starts to run away along with Bagga, Usman, Guddu and Happy 1.

Meanwhile, Happy 2's father finds out that his daughter has gone to China along with her cousins but has been missing for the past three days. Happy 2 finds Khushi and the others and follows them to catch Adnan and his gang, who are then arrested by the police. Happy 2 and Khushi thank Happy 1 and Guddu for helping them. Happy 2 and Khushi are united and she finally meets her father. The film ends with Bagga flirting with Happy 2's cousins and everyone laughing.

== Cast ==
- Sonakshi Sinha as Harpreet "Happy" Kaur/Happy 2
- Diana Penty as Harpreet "Happy" Kaur/Happy 1
- Jimmy Sheirgill as Daman Singh Bagga
- Ali Fazal as Gurdeep "Guddu" Singh, Happy 1's husband
- Piyush Mishra as Usman Afridi
- Jassie Gill as Khushwant Singh Gill a.k.a. Khushi
- Aparshakti Khurana as Aman Singh Wadhwa, Happy 2's eloped groom
- Jason Tham as Chang
- Jeeveshu Ahluwalia as Fakkuruddin Qurashi "Fa Q"
- Bijou Thaangjam as Chinese Agent
- Denzil Smith as Adnan Chow
- Raja Bundela as Happy 2's father
- Sarah Hashmi as Gurleen, Happy 2's cousin sister
- Natasha Bharadwaj as Khushwant's mother
- Gaurav Dixit as Dimpy
- Ashu Sharma as Winkle

== Soundtrack ==
Happy Phirr Bhag Jayegi

Soundtrack album by Sohail Sen
- Released: 25 July 2018
- Recorded: 2018
- Genre: Feature film soundtrack
- Length: 21:23
- Language: Hindi
- Labels: Eros Music; Saregama Music

Sohail Sen chronology
| Love per Square Foot (2018) | Happy Phirr Bhag Jayegi (2018) | Baazaar (2018) |
External audio
- Official Audio Jukebox on YouTube

The soundtrack of the film has been composed by Sohail Sen while the lyrics are written by Mudassar Aziz and Qamar Jalalabadi (noted). The song of the film, "Mera Naam Chin Chin Chu" from the 1958 film Haowrah Bridge originally sung by Geeta Dutt and composed by O. P. Nayyar has been recreated for this film by Sohail Sen in the voices of Sonakshi Sinha, Jassi Gill and Mudassar Aziz.

Track listing
| No. | Title | Singer(s) | Length |
|---|---|---|---|
| 1. | "Swag Saha Nahi Jaye" | Sohail Sen, Shadab Faridi, Neha Bhasin, Shivangi Bhayana | 4:23 |
| 2. | "Happy Bhag Jayegi" | Daler Mehndi, Harshdeep Kaur, Suvarna Tiwari | 3:44 |
| 3. | "Chin Chin Chu" (Lyrics by Qamar Jalalabadi) | Jassi Gill, Sonakshi Sinha, Mudassar Aziz | 3:45 |
| 4. | "Koi Gal Nai" | Shahid Mallya, Piyush Mishra, Rap by: Mudassar Aziz | 4:58 |
| 5. | "Kudiye Ni Tere" | Udit Narayan, Shivangi Bhayana | 4:33 |
| Total length: | | | 21:23 |

== Release ==
Happy Phirr Bhag Jayegi was released on 24 August 2018 to mixed response from film critics.
