= Krishika Lulla =

Indian film producer

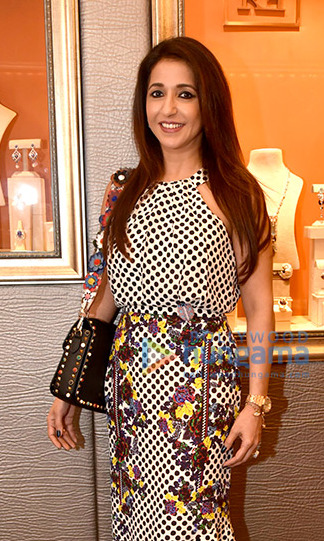
- Lulla in 2018
- Born: Krishika Singh
- Occupation(s): Film producer, writer
- Years active: 2010–present
- Organisation: Eros International
- Notable work: Tanu Weds Manu Returns; Happy Bhag Jayegi
- Spouse: Sunil Lulla
- Children: 1

Krishika Lulla is an Indian film producer. She made her foray into producing films with 2010s romantic film Anjaana Anjaani, a co-production with Sajid Nadiadwala, starring Ranbir Kapoor and Priyanka Chopra. In December 2010, India's first live action animation film Toonpur Ka Superrhero was released, with Krishika at the helm as producer.

== Personal life ==
Krishika married Sunil Lulla, managing director and executive vice-chair of Eros International.

== Career ==
2011 was a successful year for the Lulla with two more movies to her credit – the much acclaimed Chalo Dilli by Shashant Shah, a fun slice of life film starring Lara Dutta and Vinay Pathak and Desi Boyz starring Akshay Kumar, John Abraham, Deepika Padukone and Chitrangada Singh. Desi Boyz had Krishika launching the talented Rohit Dhawan, son of David Dhawan in his directorial debut.

In 2013, Krishika produced the film Raanjhanaa, directed by Anand L. Rai, starring Sonam Kapoor, Dhanush, and Abhay Deol. The film received positive reviews from critics and audiences. Bajatey Raho, another production by Krishika, featured an ensemble cast including Vinay Pathak, Ranvir Shorey, Tusshar Kapoor, Ravi Kishan and Dolly Ahluwalia.

In 2015, Krishika teamed up with notable director Anand L. Rai to present what would be one of the biggest hits of that year, Tanu Weds Manu Returns. Their association further continued with Happy Bhag Jayegi, directed by Mudassar Aziz, a family entertainer starring Diana Penty, Abhay Deol, Ali Fazal and Momal Sheikh that released on 19 August 2016.

In 2016, Krishika produced the entertainment thriller Banjo, which was a musical drama which marking multiple national award-winning Marathi Director Ravi Jadhav’s debut in Hindi starring Riteish Deshmukh and Nargis Fakhri. Banjo made its worldwide release on 23 September.

With a diverse range of Bollywood films to her credit already, Krishika has also forayed into regional cinema and backed two Marathi projects -, Phuntroo, a sci-fi romantic love story, a first for Marathi cinema, directed by National Award Winning Sujay Dahake and & Jara Hatke, starring Mrinal Kulkarni, Indraneil Sengupta, Siddharth Menon and Shivani Rangole, a beautiful story of human relationships, which she co-produced with Ravi Jadhav, both of which released earlier this year (2016).

As brand ambassador, Krishika recently hosted the launch of the new Asian restaurant Dashanzi at JW Marriott, Juhu, Mumbai.

== Filmography ==
=== As Producer ===
Year	Title	Language	Notes
2010	Anjaana Anjaani	Hindi	
2010	Toonpur Ka Super Hero	Hindi	
2011	Chalo Dilli	Hindi	
2011	Desi Boyz	Hindi	
2013	Raanjhanaa	Hindi	
2013	Bajatey Raho	Hindi	
2015	Tanu Weds Manu Returns	Hindi	
2015	Happy Bhag Jayegi	Hindi	
2015	NH10	Hindi	
2016	Phuntroo	Marathi	

== Awards ==
In 2015, she received the FOG Award at the San Francisco Global Movie Fest, organized by the Federation of Indo-American Association of Northern California.
