= Mera Naam Chin Chin Chu =

"Mera naam Chin Chin Chu"
- Helen performing "Mera naam Chin Chin Chu"

Song by Geeta Dutt
- Language: Hindi
- Genre: Filmi, Swing music (original version), Hindustani classical music, Bhangra (2018 version)
- Length: 4:26
- Composer: O. P. Nayyar
- Lyricist: Qamar Jalalabadi

"Mera Naam Chin Chin Chu" (lit. 'My Name is Chin Chin Chu') is a song from the 1958 Indian film Howrah Bridge. It was sung by Geeta Dutt, and was picturised on Helen. The song has lyrics by Qamar Jalalabadi and was composed by O.P. Nayyar. The tune at the beginning of the song was created by S Hazara Singh, the Hawaiian guitarist of OP Nayyar.

== Music Video ==
In the movie, Helen plays "Chin Chin Chu", a flirtatious dancer from Shanghai who sings the song.

The song became highly popular, and rejuvenated the career of the singer Geeta Dutt. It was also the first major hit for Helen.

The song was parodied as 'Mera naam mum mum mum' in the film Hum Saath Saath Hain (1999) in one of the intros of "Sunoji Dulhan".

== Personnel ==
A homage to the song was released on 10 August 2018 and is featured in the 2018 film Happy Phirr Bhag Jayegi. Presented by Eros International & Aanand L Rai, Happy Phirr Bhag Jayegi is a Colour Yellow Production. Director Mudassar Aziz has provided additional lyrics to this version of the song, while Punjabi singing sensation and Hindi film debutant Jassi Gill has provided the male vocals, Sonakshi Sinha who plays the titular character in Happy Phirr Bhag Jayegi has provided the female vocals. Taking forward the original version by O.P. Nayyar, this version has been composed by Sohail Sen.
