= Wasiq Khan =

Indian production designer

- Born: 1975 (age 50–51)
- Died: 5 May 2025
- Education: Jamia Millia Islamia
- Occupations: Production designer, Art director
- Years active: 1997 – 2025
- Known for: Gangs of Wasseypur (2012)

Wasiq Khan (1975 - 5 May 2025) was an Indian production designer and art director, who works in Bollywood. He has two daughters. He is known for his gritty realism in Anurag Kashyap's films such as That Girl in Yellow Boots (2011) and Gangs of Wasseypur (2012), and Masala films such as Dabangg (2010), Raanjhanaa (2013), and Goliyon Ki Raasleela Ram-Leela (2013) directed by Sanjay Leela Bhansali.

== Early life and background ==
Khan was brought up in Delhi, his father was an engineer by profession. He has two daughters aged 23 and 18 respectively. He graduated from Faculty of Fine Arts at Jamia Millia Islamia University in Delhi in 1996. During his college days, he met Samir Chanda during a shoot of Ketan Mehta's film Sardar (1993).

== Career ==
After completing his graduation in 1996, Khan left for Mumbai with a business card of Samir Chanda. However unable to contact Chanda, he managed to get a job as a backdrop painter with art director Ratnakar Phadke at Kamalistan Studios. After a few months, he did meet Chanda, who hired him as an assistant for the production of Tamil period drama, Iruvar (1997), which was directed by Mani Ratnam and Hari-Bhari (2000) directed by Shyam Benegal. Chanda is known for his realism in films like Dil Se.. (1998), Guru (2007), Omkara (2006) and Rang De Basanti (2006).

In 1999, Chanda recommended his name to Anurag Kashyap for Last Train to Mahakali, a 1999 television short film for Star Bestsellers series on Star Plus. This became Khan's first break as an independent production designer. Next he worked, Matrubhoomi (2003). He also worked in Kashyap's directorial debut, Paanch which was made in 2003, however never got released. Subsequently, he worked with Kashyap's noir-influenced films, Black Friday (2004) set in the 1993 Bombay bombings, No Smoking (2007), Gulaal (2009), That Girl in Yellow Boots (2010), however it was his work in Gangs of Wasseypur (2012), that got him recognition. Though, he didn't work on Kashyap's Dev.D (2009), Khan work collaboration with Kashyap has played a key role in establishing the distinctive visual language of Kashyap's films.

He worked in genres ranging from thrillers like Milan Luthria's Taxi No. 9211 (2006), Raj Kumar Gupta's Aamir (2008) to art films Dharm (2007) directed by Bhavna Talwar, which won the National Award for Best Feature Film on National Integration. His breakthrough into mainstream Bollywood came with Salman Khan starrer Wanted (2009) directed by Prabhu Deva. This was followed another action hit Dabangg (2010) also starring Salman Khan. Since he doesn't use software, for the film he drew over 100 sketches detailing out every set in the film. Meanwhile, he also worked on romantic comedies, like Tanu Weds Manu (2011), Ladies vs Ricky Bahl (2011) and Raanjhanaa (2013). For 2010 sleeper hit Tere Bin Laden (2010), the Abbottabad city in Pakistan was recreated in Film City, Mumbai. Also in the same year, for Sanjay Dutt-starrer Lamhaa (2010), sets of Kashmir erected in Film City, Mumbai, where the film is set. For this two truckloads of chinar tree leaves were brought in from Kashmir.

Akshay Kumar-starrer Rowdy Rathore (2012) directed by Prabhu Deva was co-produced by Sanjay Leela Bhansali, whose next project Goliyon Ki Raasleela Ram-Leela (2013) for which elaborate sets were created in Mumbai, where the film was shot for 10 months.

For his style he used work of Peruvian-born painter Boris Vallejo as reference, as he believes "it contains everything, realism, surrealism, and colours playing against each other. I never look at other movies. He has been the only inspiration since college." His upcoming projects include, Bhootnath Returns, a sequel to Bhoothnath (2008), a biopic on the political prisoner Sarabjit Singh, a Hindi remake of the Tamil film Ramanaa (2002), and 21 Topon ki Salaami.

== Death ==
Khan died on 5 May 2025.

== Filmography ==
- Dil Se.. (1998) (assistant art director)
- Last Train to Mahakali (1999)
- Hari-Bhari (2000) (assistant art director)
- Matrubhoomi (2003)
- Paanch (2003)
- Samay: When Time Strikes (2003)
- Ek Se Badhkar Ek (2004)
- Black Friday (2004)
- Pehchaan: The Face of Truth (2005)
- Taxi No. 9211 (2006)
- Shoonya (2006)
- Shakalaka Boom Boom (2007)
- No Smoking (2007)
- Dharm (2007)
- Shaurya (2008)
- Woodstock Villa (2008)
- Hansie (2008)
- Aamir (2008)
- Maharathi (2008)
- Gulaal (2009)
- Victory (2009)
- Wanted (2009)
- Radio: Love on Air (2009)
- Accident on Hill Road (2009)
- Tere Bin Laden (2010)
- Striker (2010)
- That Girl in Yellow Boots (2010)
- Lamhaa (2010)
- Mumbai Cutting (2010)
- Dabangg (2010)
- Shahrukh Bola "Khoobsurat Hai Tu" (2010)
- Shagird (2011)
- Tanu Weds Manu (2011)
- Miley Naa Miley Hum (2011)
- Ladies vs Ricky Bahl (2011)
- Gangs of Wasseypur (2012)
- Rowdy Rathore (2012)
- Meridian Lines (2013)
- Raanjhanaa (2013)
- Divana-e-Ishq (2013)
- Besharam (2013)
- Goliyon Ki Raasleela Ram-Leela (2013)
- Bhoothnath Returns (2014)
- Ekkees Toppon Ki Salaami (2014)
- Moothon (2018)
- Jazbaa (2015)
- Freaky Ali (2016)
- Happy Bhag Jayegi (2016)
- Zero (2018)
- Dabangg 3 (2019)
- Laxmii (2020)
- Thar (2022)
- Emergency (2025)

=== Set Constructions and Designs of Tele Serials ===
- Tere Sheher Mein 2015 (Star Plus)
- Gulaam 2017 (Life OK)
- Moh Moh Ke Dhaage 2017 (Sony)
- Ek Dhuje Ke Waaste 2016 (Sony)
- Anaami 2017 (Star Plus)
