= Happy Bhag Jayegi =

2016 Indian film by Mudassar Aziz

- Theatrical release poster
- Directed by: Mudassar Aziz
- Written by: Mudassar Aziz
- Produced by: Aanand L. Rai; Krishika Lulla
- Starring: Diana Penty; Abhay Deol; Jimmy Sheirgill; Ali Fazal; Momal Sheikh
- Cinematography: Saurabh Goswami
- Edited by: Ninad Khanolkar
- Music by: Sohail Sen
- Production companies: Colour Yellow Productions; Eros International
- Distributed by: Eros International
- Release date: 19 August 2016
- Running time: 126 minutes
- Country: India
- Language: Hindi
- Budget: ₹20 crore
- Box office: est.₹46.5 crore

Happy Bhag Jayegi (transl. Happy will run away) is a 2016 Indian Hindi-language romantic comedy film, written and directed by Mudassar Aziz, and produced by Aanand L. Rai and Krishika Lulla. It stars Diana Penty as the eponymous character; a free-spirited bride-to-be from Amritsar who runs away from her wedding ceremony and inadvertently arrives in Lahore, Pakistan. The production features an ensemble cast consisting of Penty, Abhay Deol, Jimmy Sheirgill, Ali Fazal, and Momal Sheikh.

Aziz began writing for the film in 2012 and later approached Rai to produce it. Happy Bhag Jayegi was conceived as a "cross-border" romantic comedy and was originally titled Dolly Lahore Mein. Although a large part of the film is set in Lahore, the film was primarily shot in Chandigarh and Amritsar with Saurabh Goswami working as the director of photography. The film featured Pakistani actors Javed Sheikh and his daughter Momal Sheikh. The film is Momal Sheikh's Bollywood debut. The music for Happy Bhag Jayegi was composed by Sohail Sen and released under the label of Eros Music. Eros International acquired the worldwide distribution rights for the production, which runs for 126 minutes in its final cut.

Happy Bhag Jayegi was released theatrically in India on 19 August 2016; it opened to mixed responses from film critics, who appreciated the performances of the ensemble cast and the humour. Criticism was focused on its scattered screenplay, inconsistent tone, and relatively poor characterisation of the central character. Despite mixed reviews, the film was an average grosser at the box office, collecting ₹465 million against a budget of ₹200 million. It was considered a sleeper hit by media outlets in India. A sequel titled Happy Phirr Bhag Jayegi was released on 24 August 2018.

== Plot ==
Harpreet "Happy" Kaur is supposed to marry Corporator Daman Singh Bagga in Amritsar, India, but has planned to elope with her musician boyfriend Guddu. She inadvertently finds herself aboard a lorry destined for Lahore; she is trapped inside a fruit basket that is delivered to the house of Bilal Ahmed, the ex-local governor's son. Meanwhile, in Amritsar, Guddu is taken hostage by Bagga.

After fleeing Bilal's house, Happy creates a ruckus at a local marketplace and is arrested by police officer Usman Afridi. The officer informs Bilal, who decides to arrange for Happy's deportation. Unwilling to return to Amritsar, Happy blackmails Bilal into helping her using a contrived story about her being abducted by Bilal and his father. Bilal is then confronted by his fiancée Zoya, who initially suspects him of having an affair with Happy. Zoya later suggests bringing Guddu to Lahore, having him marry Happy there, and deporting them together. Bilal begrudgingly agrees to help Happy but has difficulty keeping her a secret from his father and struggles to keep Happy reined in. Bilal finds himself attracted to Happy, who develops a close friendship with him and Zoya.

When Bilal's father travels to China for two weeks, he decides to go to India with Afridi to rescue Guddu. They pose as members of a Lahore-based music company and persuade Bagga they want Guddu to perform for their production in Lahore. Bagga realises their subterfuge and helplessly watches them board a bus to Lahore from Attari. He hires goons who abduct Happy from Bilal's house and sets off to Lahore along with Happy's father. Afridi arrests Bagga upon arrival and Happy's father escapes.

Afridi rescues Happy, who re-unites with Guddu. Completely smitten with Happy, Bilal begins to avoid Zoya but reconciles with her later. Happy's father, in his desperate attempts to find his daughter, is mistaken for an Indian spy who is planning to kill Bilal's father. Bilal arranges for Happy's marriage to Guddu at a mass wedding event. Having escaped prison, Bagga also arrives at the mass wedding disguised as a groom. The event turns chaotic when Happy's father makes a frenzied attempt to get the governor's attention using a police officer's gun. Happy marries Guddu and they head to the airport chased by Happy's father, Bilal and Zoya, and Bagga and his goons who lose track of the group. Before boarding the flight to Amritsar, Happy seeks validation from her father, who obliges. She embraces Zoya and Bilal and departs.

In a post-credits scene, Bagga seeks support for his election campaign at a public rally with Happy and Guddu in attendance; he declares himself the couple's saviour. Onlookers react with complete bafflement, much to the duo's amusement.

== Cast ==
- Diana Penty as Harpreet Kaur aka Happy
- Abhay Deol as Bilal Ahmed
- Ali Fazal as Gurdeep Singh aka Guddu
- Momal Sheikh as Zoya
- Jimmy Sheirgill as Daman Singh Bagga
- Lankesh Bhardwaj as Rajinder
- Kanwaljit Singh as Happy's Father
- Javed Sheikh as Javed Ahmed, Bilal's Father
- Piyush Mishra as Usman Afridi
- Jagat Rawat as Fakhru
- Ayesha Raza Mishra as Rifat Bi
- Ashu Sharma as Winkle

== Production ==
=== Development ===
Happy is a crazy character. She's is fun, she is loud, she wears her heart on her sleeve. She's impulsive, she says what is on her mind. And it is all these quirks that make her very endearing.

— Diana Penty on Happy's characterisation.

Mudassar Aziz had been working on the script for Happy Bhag Jayegi since 2012; pre-production work for the project began when Aanand L. Rai agreed to produce it under the label Colour Yellow Productions with Aziz as the director. It was Rai's first venture as a producer and Aziz's first as a director in over four years. (Note: Although Happy Bhag Jayegi was Rai's first production effort, Nil Battey Sannata, also produced by Rai's Colour Yellow Productions, was released in April 2016, before the former.) The film was conceived as a "cross-border" romantic comedy and was originally titled Dolly Lahore Mein, a reference to film's setting, Lahore, Pakistan. The title was later changed to the current one because the central character was renamed Harpreet "Happy" Kaur. Rai talked about his transition from a director to producer, saying that being associated with a project as a producer would help him become "a complete filmmaker". Rai said he would not interfere with Aziz's creative process and would give him complete freedom as a writer and director.

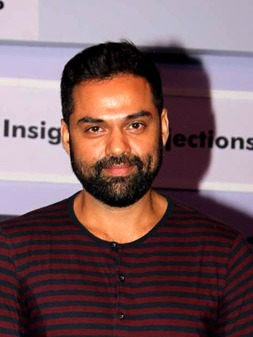
Rai had wanted to work with Deol since the completion of their last project

Abhay Deol had previously collaborated with Rai for the 2013 romantic drama Raanjhanaa; the latter was impressed by Deol's performance in that film and expressed his interest in working with him again. Subsequently, Rai offered Deol the role of Bilal Ahmed. Diana Penty was cast as the central character; it was Penty's first project since her screen debut in the romantic comedy Cocktail (2012). Penty said she was instantly attracted to the film's script and the character, which was nothing like her previous role and described Happy as a "very confident and ... quite a forthcoming character". Before filming began, Penty spent considerable time in Amritsar to acclimatise to the environment. Punjabi actor Nilima Sharma helped Penty further prepare for the role; she said, "I picked up a lot from [Sharma], especially things like her diction and body language".

Happy Bhag Jayegi marks the Bollywood debut of Pakistani actor Momal Sheikh, who was cast as Deol's fiancée. The production team approached Sheikh's father Javed Sheikh for a part in the film and sought his help with casting the role of Zoya. After auditioning, the actors suggested by Javed were unsuitable; the team then contacted Momal, who read through the script multiple times before agreeing to work on the production. Ali Fazal was offered the role of Guddu, an unsuccessful musician and Penty's love interest in the film. Faza described the character as "a very boy-next-door, vulnerable kind". Jimmy Sheirgill, who was one of the last actors to join the cast, said he was attracted to the film's "novel" concept. Happy Bhag Jayegi also features Kanwaljit Singh, Piyush Mishra, Jagat Rawat, Ayesha Raza Mishra, and Ashu Sharma in supporting roles.

=== Filming and post-production ===
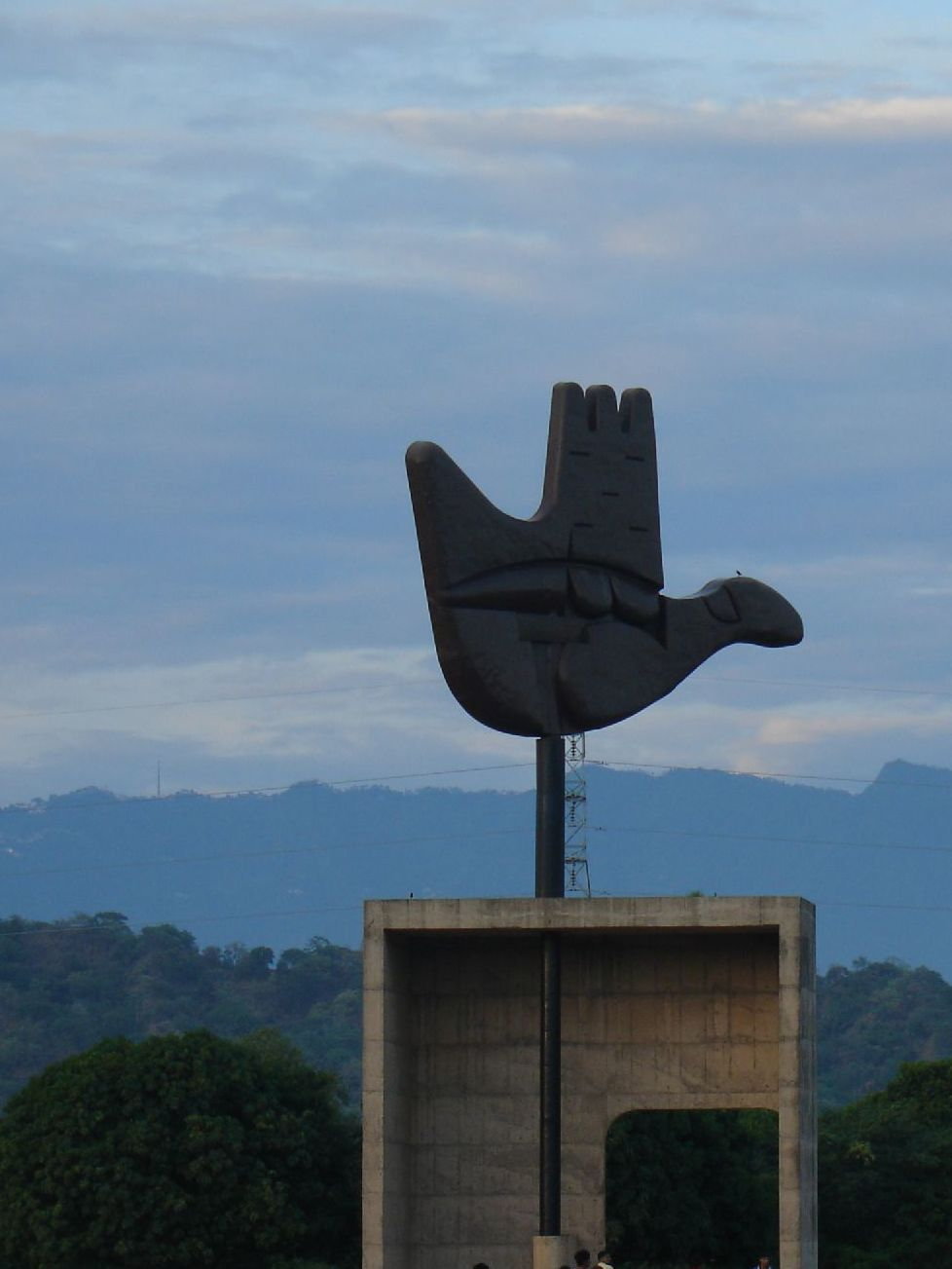
Filming was primarily done in Chandigarh, Punjab

Principal photography for Happy Bhag Jayegi began in September 2015; it took place in Amritsar, Chandigarh, and Mumbai in separate schedules. Saurabh Goswami worked as the director of photography and the production design was handled by Wasiq Khan. The costumes, which included traditional Indian clothing for Penty, and Pathani suits for Deol were designed by Ankita Jha and Nidhi Gambhir. While a large part of Happy Bhag Jayegi is set in Lahore, Pakistan, the film was shot at locations in various cities of Punjab, India. Most of the filming was done outdoors and the crew faced difficulties managing the sets at crowded locations such as Amritsar's Inter-state Bus Terminal and at ISBT sector 17 Chandigarh

The filming process for Happy Bhag Jayegi was completed in March 2016. The production's rough cut was edited by the Mumbai-based editor and technician Ninad Khanolkar and the sound mixing was done by Arun Nambiar. Co-produced by Rai under his label Colour Yellow Productions and Krishika Lulla of Eros International, the film was made on an estimated budget of ₹200 million (US$2.1 million). Its final cut runs for 126 minutes. The international distribution rights for Happy Bhag Jayegi were acquired by Eros International. Lulla released a statement discussing the project's "local milieu" and the universal theme; she said the film "brings out flavours of real India [and] highlights intricacies of human emotions and will touch everyone's heart".

== Soundtrack ==
The soundtrack for Happy Bhag Jayegi was composed by music director and singer Sohail Sen. The lyrics were written by Mudassar Aziz, with the exception of the song "Gabru Ready To Mingle Hai", which features a rap segment with English lyrics written by Dee MC. Harshdeep Kaur, Shahid Mallya, Mika Singh, Neeti Mohan, Tarannum Malik, Danish Sabri, Arijit Singh, and Altamash Faridi provided vocals for the album's songs. The soundtrack was released on 1 August 2016 on the label Eros Music.

== Marketing and Promotion ==
A promotional first-look poster for Happy Bhag Jayegi showing Penty and Deol wearing traditional salwar kamiz and sneakers, and a pathani suit and a Nehru jacket respectively, was released on 19 July 2016. Fazal and Shergill are visible in the background. The trailer for the film was released by the cast and crew during an episode of The Kapil Sharma Show, an Indian television sketch comedy series. Upon release, the three-minute trailer received positive comments from reviewers; a writer from Daily News and Analysis said it had "a lot of commotion and funny moments that'll tickle you ... our heart goes out to Abhay who is simply at his best".

=== Controversy ===
During the Happy Bhag Jayegi musical event in 2016, Mika Singh cracked a joke on Penty's surname, that did not go well with her. After much prodding, the actress opened up on the matter and said, "I don’t find these jokes funny. I don’t even understand how people laugh at such comments."

== Release ==
Happy Bhag Jayegi was released theatrically in India on 19 August 2016.

== Reception ==
=== Critical response ===
Happy Bhag Jayegi received a mixed response from film critics. Rohit Vats of the Hindustan Times praised the film, writing that the "supply of situational comedy won't end till you leave the theatre", and added that although the idea initially seems "far-fetched", the build-up to the film's climax dispelled his doubts. Nandini Ramnath of Scroll.in similarly said the film "survives its manufactured premise", "has enough momentum to steer it through even its most unmanageable manoeuvres", and "sprints hilariously to the victory podium". The view was also shared by Rajeev Masand who was appreciative of the film's comic elements in his review for News18; he wrote that the film is "mostly fun despite its shortcomings, because the humor [was] earned". Writing for the Deccan Chronicle, Rohit Bhatnagar dubbed the production a "perfect family entertainer" and called it Aziz's best work. Similarly, The Wire critic Tanul Thakur attributed the film's appeal to Aziz's "honest" writing and attention to detail, noting it showed that "[Aziz] is invested and, more importantly, cares about his story". Both India Today's Suhani Singh and The Hindu's Namrata Joshi also praised the refreshing treatment of relationship between India and Pakistan in the film.

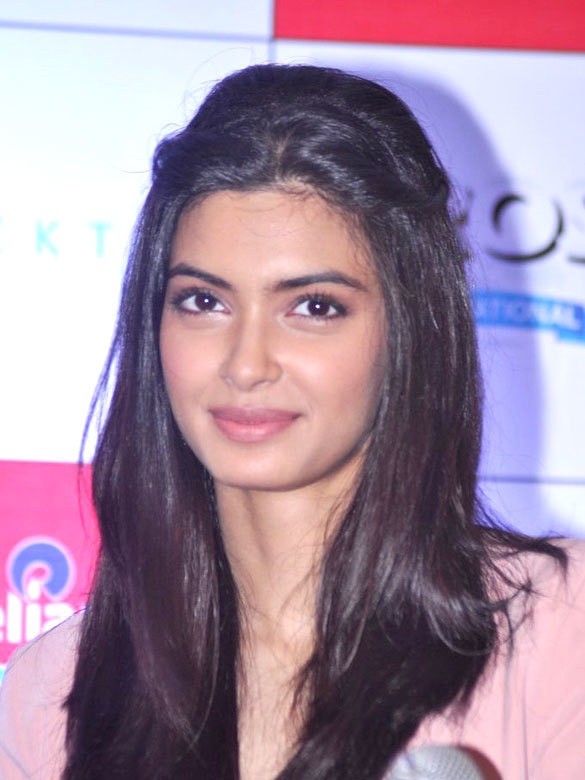
Penty's character and performance garnered a largely polarised response from critics

Commentators including Uday Bhatia of Mint and Shubhra Gupta of The Indian Express were critical of the film's scattered narrative; the latter noted the script's intermittent humour, saying, "despite its occasional throwaway lines, and nice touches, it never comes together". Bhatia also praised the comical aspect, writing that despite the film's silly premise he "still found [him]self laughing". Saibal Chatterjee criticised Aziz's direction in his review for NDTV; he wrote that Aziz did not use the "narrative pieces ... consistently enough to be able to deliver an outright winner". Chatterjee also responded negatively to the change in tone of the narrative in the film's latter half. He was enthusiastic about the film's inoffensive nature, calling it a rarity in comedy films and saying its inoffensiveness "add[s] up to a lot". Sukanya Verma of Rediff.com was largely dismissive of the "witless and flimsy" plot. She was also critical of the poor characterisation of the title character, calling her a "sloppy protagonist who's neither convincing in her mischief nor original in her exploits", and added that the character is further weighed down by a script "that sees odd virtue in her cantankerous ways".

The performances of most of the cast were well received by film critics. Penty was variously dubbed as "brimming with potential" and a "misfit". Her performance was also a subject of contrasting opinions; Bhatnagar wrote that "she steals the spotlight in every frame" but Singh said she "lacks the thespian skills to uplift the spirited character". Deol, however, was widely praised for his performance in the film, with Ramnath writing, "he superbly brings out Bilal's nuances, steering the character expertly through both the quieter and the laugh-out-loud scenes". He was also described by Firstpost's Anna M. M. Vetticad and Chatterjee as "charamatic" and "the anchor around which [the film] pivots", respectively. The supporting cast also received a largely positive response; Fazal was lauded by Singh for his "measured performance" and Sheikh was deemed a "revelation" by Vats. Shergill was singled out by Thakur, who described his performance as "a man high on testosterone, low on intelligence, a delightful lowlife".

=== Box office ===
Happy Bhag Jayegi was released on about 1,000 screens but had a relatively poor opening collection of about ₹23 million (US$240,000). The slow start was attributed to the film's marketing and competition faced from the big-budget productions including Rustom and Mohenjo Daro. The collections grew over the course of the weekend; the film earned ₹38 million (US$390,000) on Saturday and ₹46 million (US$480,000) on Sunday to bring the first-weekend total to ₹107 million (US$1.1 million); the increase in its earnings was credited to positive word of mouth. Collections held steady throughout the week with the film grossing a total of ₹178 million (US$1.8 million). Happy Bhag Jayegi did particularly well in urban areas such as Mumbai and the National Capital Region, where it collected ₹85 million (US$880,000) and ₹77 million (US$800,000), respectively. Despite a slow start, the film grossed a total of ₹391 million (US$4.1 million) at the domestic box office in its theatrical run and was a considered a sleeper hit by media outlets. Happy Bhag Jayegi earned ₹23.5 million (US$240,000) at the North American box office and about ₹40 million (US$420,000) in the such other international markets as the United Kingdom, Australia, and New Zealand. The film has grossed ₹465 million (US$4.8 million) worldwide.

== Sequel ==
Penty confirmed her involvement in a sequel to Happy Bhag Jayegi through her Twitter account. Rai and Lulla were also confirmed to return as producers, and Aziz was retained as writer and director for the sequel. Titled Happy Phirr Bhag Jayegi, the sequel, also starring Sonakshi Sinha as the titular character who gets mistaken for Penty's titular character, was released on 24 August 2018.
