= Diana Penty =

Indian actress (born 1985)

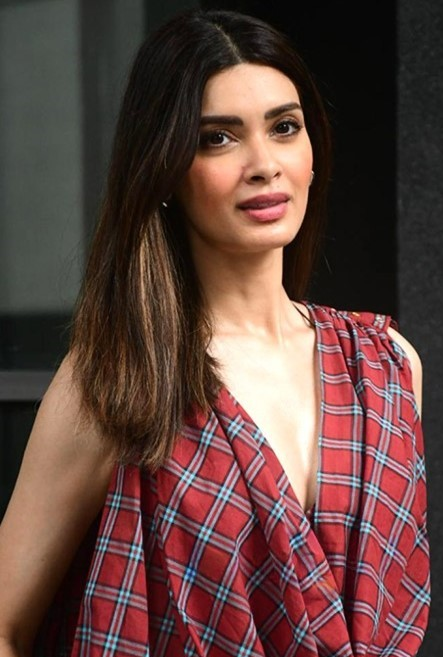
- Penty in 2025
- Born: 2 November 1985 (age 41); Bombay, Maharashtra, India
- Education: St. Xavier's College
- Occupation: Actress
- Years active: 2005–present
- Partner: Harsh Sagar (2013–present)

Diana Penty (pronounced [ɖaːjəna ˈpeːɳʈi]; born 2 November 1985) is an Indian actress who works predominantly in Hindi films. She began her modelling career in 2005 when she was signed up by Elite Models India. Penty then made her acting debut with the romantic comedy film Cocktail (2012), for which she earned the Filmfare Award for Best Female Debut nomination.

After a four-year hiatus, Penty portrayed the titular role of a runaway bride in Happy Bhag Jayegi (2016), a sleeper hit. She went on to play an army officer in Parmanu: The Story of Pokhran (2018), a public service volunteer in Shiddat (2021), and the leading lady in the streaming film Bloody Daddy (2023). Her highest grossing release came with Chhaava (2025). Penty had her web expansion with the series Do You Wanna Partner (2025).

In addition to her acting career, Penty is a prominent celebrity endorser for brands and products.

== Early life ==
Penty was born on 2 November 1985 in Mumbai, Maharashtra to a Parsi father and a Goan Catholic mother. She attended St. Agnes High School in Mumbai, and graduated with a bachelor's degree in Mass Media from St. Xavier's College.

== Career ==
=== Modelling career (2005–2011) ===
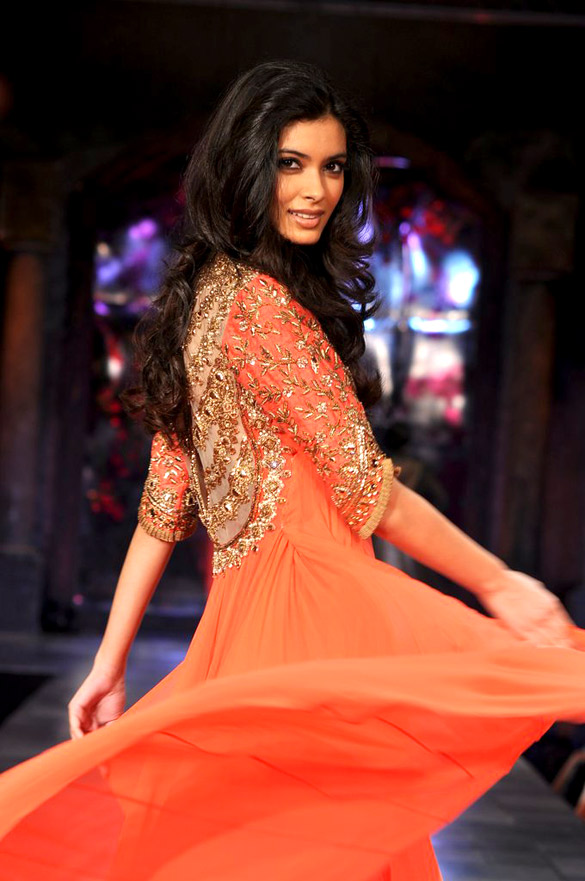
Penty at an event in 2011

Penty began her modeling when she sent her photographs to Elite Models India, who liked her work and suggested she take up modelling assignments. At this stage, she was in college and was reluctant to choose a career in modeling, so Penty decided to work part-time as a fashion model. In 2005, Penty officially started working for Elite Models India, and made her runway debut at the Indo-Italian Festival for Italian designers Nicola Trussardi and Gianfranco Ferré. Thereafter, Penty modelled for several other Indian designers, including Wendell Rodricks, Rohit Bal and Rina Dhaka. By 2007, she had established a successful modelling career after appearing in print campaigns for some of India's most prominent brands, including Tribhovandas Bhimji Zaveri, Parachute and Westside; as well as featuring on the covers of a few Indian fashion magazines.

The following year, Penty went on to model at an international circuit when she started to endorse global brands excluding Maybelline, Garnier and Forever 21. On Penty's international appeal, the CEO of Elite Models India Sushma Puri commented, "Diana has a face that is very versatile and appeals to both Indian and international markets and she is also young, beautiful and confident. This makes her the ideal choice for any international brand." Later in her modelling career Penty started to receive film offers, though she believed herself to be too inexperienced, and rejected them to focus on modelling. From 2008 to 2010, Penty established herself internationally after modelling for fashion weeks in Paris and New York.

=== Breakthrough, hiatus and critical acclaim (2012–2018) ===
Penty was originally slated to make her Bollywood debut in 2011 with Imtiaz Ali's Rockstar opposite Ranbir Kapoor, although she rejected the film due to her modelling commitments at the time and was subsequently replaced by Nargis Fakhri. She later signed up for Homi Adajania's Cocktail instead; at Ali's suggestion. Cast alongside Saif Ali Khan and Deepika Padukone, the film received mixed to positive reviews. Penty's portrayal of Meera, a simple Indian girl with traditional values was well received by critics. Taran Adarsh commented that "Diana, who makes her acting debut, gets to portray a rather difficult character for her debut film. There's a very disarming kind of innocence that she brings to the role and she impresses a great deal." Raja Sen agreed, mentioning that she is "refreshingly natural". Anupama Chopra added that "Diana is saddled with the most colourless character but [...] infuses her role with a quiet poise and holds her own." Her performance earned her nominations at numerous award ceremonies, including Filmfare Award for Best Female Debut and IIFA Award for Best Supporting Actress. Cocktail emerged a commercial success at the box office.

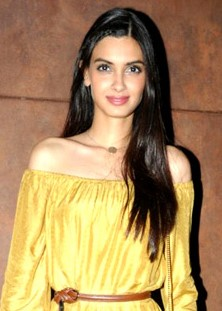
Penty in 2017

After a four-year absence from the screen, Penty played the titular runaway bride, Happy opposite Ali Fazal and Abhay Deol in Aanand L. Rai's production Happy Bhag Jayegi (2016), written and directed by Mudassar Aziz, which tells the story of her character's ensuing adventures when, in an attempt to elope with her lover, she instead ends up on the other side of the border, much to the chagrin of a young politician whose house she ends up in. About the break from acting, Penty said: "It wasn't a conscious break. I was taking my time looking to be a part of an interesting story. I didn't want to do anything that came my way." The film earned mixed reviews from critics but was a sleeper hit. Rohit Bhatnagar wrote that Penty "steals the spotlight in every frame", while Anna M. M. Vetticad of Firstpost said: "Penty is brimming with potential [...] but her Happy, despite being the titular protagonist, is the most under-written character."

Her only release in 2017 was debutante Ranjit Tiwari's prison film Lucknow Central, where she played Gayatri, a diligent NGO worker who champions the cause of a band formed by a group of prison inmates, opposite Farhan Akhtar. Renuka Vyavahare from Times of India noted that she plays her part well. It was a box office failure. Penty had two film releases in 2018. She first played an army officer, Captain Ambalika, in Abhishek Sharma's period drama Parmanu: The Story of Pokhran opposite John Abraham. Bollywood Hungama critic mentioned, "Diana has a crucial part and essays the no nonsense character very well." It emerged a commercial success. In her second film that year, she reprised her titular role in Happy Phirr Bhag Jayegi, a sequel to Happy Bhag Jayegi, alongside Sonakshi Sinha, who played an eponymous namesake. It underperformed compared to the prequel.

=== Commercial fluctuation and streaming films (2019-2024) ===
In 2019, she had special song appearance alongside singer Badshah and actors Suniel Shetty and Raveena Tandon as the proverbial "Shehar Ki Ladki" in a promotional music video of the song, a remake of an eponymous hit, for Khandaani Shafakhana (2019).

Penty played Ira, a public service volunteer who has a friction of ideology with her husband, in director Kunal Deshmukh's 2021 romantic drama Shiddat opposite Mohit Raina. India Today's Samriddhi Srivastava noted, "Though Penty gets extremely limited screen time in comparison to her male counterparts, she leave a mark as free-spirited, practical and open-minded women." Penty then expanded to Malayalam films in 2022 with Salute opposite Dulquer Salmaan portraying Dia, Salmaan's love interest. Haricharan Pudipeddi mentioned, "The women have very less to contribute to the film and Diana Penty gets wasted in a role that has no impact." Both films had digital release.

In her first release of 2023, Penty portrayed an actor's wife Naina, opposite Akshay Kumar in Raj Mehta's Selfiee. Anna M. M. Vetticad stated that she "brings a glowing dignity" to her role. It emerged a box office failure. Penty then played a NCB officer Aditi in Bloody Daddy opposite Shahid Kapoor, which had a digital release. Monika Rawal Kukreja opined that she doesn't go overboard and maintains a calming balance. Penty played a mysterious women alongside Nawazuddin Siddiqui in Adbhut, her only release of 2024. The film directly released on Sony Max. A Bollywood Hungama critic was appreciative of her performance in a role that she has never done before.

=== Career progression (2025–present) ===
In her first release of 2025, Penty portrayed Kesar, a rebellious wife opposite Ajay Devgn and Mohit Malik in Azaad. Vineeta Kumar of India Today stated, "While, Penty doesn't get a lot of screen-space, she and Devgn add the required edge and delicacy to the story." It was a box office failure. Following this, she portrayed Mughal princess Zinat-un-Nissa Begum in Chhaava. Rishabh Suri from Hindustan Times stated that her character needed a bit more menace. A box office success, it emerged as one of the highest-grossing Indian film of all time and Penty's highest grossing release. Penty then played an investigating cop Natasha in Detective Sherdil, alongside Diljit Dosanjh. The film had a digital release. While some critics felt she was "underutilised", Vinamra Mathur of Firstpost noted, "Penty brings a certain sense of gravitas to her performance with her no-nonsense attitude." In the same year, Penty expanded to web with the series Do You Wanna Partner, where she played a beer startup owner opposite Nakuul Mehta.

Penty will next appear in Section 84 alongside Amitabh Bachchan.

== Off-screen work ==
Inspired by her character in Lucknow Central, Penty volunteered for an NGO in 2017. She also supports a number of causes. In 2020, she provides safety gear to Mumbai police amid the COVID-19 pandemic and additionally collaborated with Ketto India for the initiative #EveryLifeMatters, to help provide relief and financial support during the crisis.

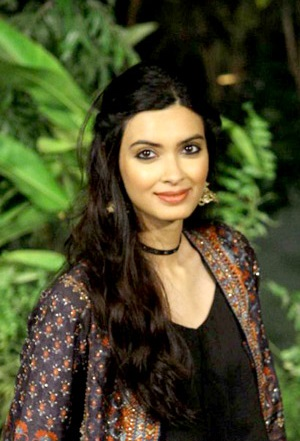
Penty at the Lakme Fashion Week in 2017

Penty made her Cannes Film Festival debut in 2019 and has subsequently appeared on the red carpet the following years. She has ramp walked at the Lakme Fashion Week. She has been cover model for several magazines including Vogue, Elle, Verve, Women's Health India, Grazia India and Femina among others.

Penty has been very vocal on various issues. Praising the #MeToo movement, she said, "I am proud that the #MeToo movement has kick-started. It is commendable that women are coming out and bringing light to the issues which they went through in the past. It takes a lot of courage."

=== Controversy ===
During Happy Bhag Jayegi musical event in 2016, Mika Singh cracked a joke on Penty's surname, that did not go well with her. After much prodding, the actress opened up on the matter and said, "I don’t find these jokes funny. I don’t even understand how people laugh at such comments."

== Personal life ==
Penty has been in a relationship with diamond merchant Harsh Sagar since 2013.

== Artistry and public image ==
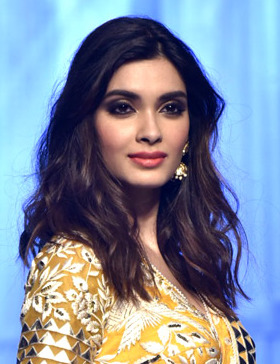
Penty in 2019

Post her debut, Penty was termed as the "next big thing" in Hindi cinema. Aishwarya Acharya of Femina finds her to be "sensitive, astute, calm, passionate and hopeful". Rajeev Masand termed her "refreshingly natural". Grazia's Tanya Mehta says Penty has a "compelling onscreen presence" and added that she is here to stay. Ashwini Deshmukh of Filmfare noted, "Penty's choice of roles and rare confidence has given her two hits in her short but snazzy career." Penty took a hiatus of 4 years just after her debut film. On her approach of choosing films, she said,

"I know it did take me a while in the beginning, but now, I have got the momentum and I don’t want that to stop. I’ve made a certain conscious effort to play different roles and do different genre of films because that’s the way it’s challenging and keeps things exciting for me."

Penty was placed 10th in Times of India's 10 Most Promising Female Newcomers of 2012 list. The same year, Penty became the ninth most trended personality on Google in India. In 2013, she won Grazia Face of the Year. Later, she was placed 15th in Eastern Eye's 50 Sexiest Asian Women List. She ranked 25th in 2013 and 23rd in 2019 in Times' 50 Most Desirable Woman List. Apart from acting and modelling, Penty is an endorser for several brands and products including TRESemmé and Nokia, in particular the Lumia 510. She became the first Indian star to endorse Estée Lauder India. She is also the brand ambassador of Garnier. Penty is widely known for her fashion style.

== Filmography ==
Key
†	Denotes films that have not yet been released

=== Films ===
- All films are in Hindi unless otherwise noted.

Year	Title	Role	Notes	Ref.
2012	Cocktail	Meera Sahni		
2016	Happy Bhag Jayegi	Harpreet "Happy" Kaur		
2017	Lucknow Central	Gayatri Kashyap		
2018	Parmanu: The Story of Pokhran	Capt. Ambalika Bandopadhyay / Nakul Singh		
2018	Happy Phirr Bhag Jayegi	Harpreet "Happy" Kaur		
2019	Khandaani Shafakhana	Sunita	Special appearance in song "Sheher Ki Ladki"	
2021	Shiddat	Ira Sharma Sehgal		
2022	Salute	Dia	Malayalam film	
2023	Selfiee	Naina		
2023	Bloody Daddy	Aditi Rawat		
2024	Adbhut	Mary Mathews / Anjali Malhotra / Amy Mathews		
2025	Azaad	Kesar Bahadur		
2025	Chhaava	Zinat-un-Nissa Begum		
2025	Detective Sherdil	Natasha		
2026	Section 84 †	TBA	Post-production	

=== Television ===
Year	Title	Role	Notes	Ref.
2025	Do You Wanna Partner	Anahita Makujina		

=== Music video appearance ===
Year	Title	Singer	Ref.
2020	"Challon Ke Nishaan"	Stebin Ben	

== Accolades ==
Year	Award	Category	Work	Result	Ref.
2012	BIG Star Entertainment Awards	Most Entertaining Actor (Film) Debut - Female	Cocktail	Nominated	
2012	Cosmopolitan Fun Fearless Awards	Best Female Debut	Cocktail	Won	
2013	Filmfare Awards	Best Female Debut	Cocktail	Nominated	
2013	Screen Awards	Most Promising Newcomer – Female	Cocktail	Nominated	
2013	Zee Cine Awards	Best Female Debut	Cocktail	Nominated	
2013	Star Guild Awards	Best Female Debut	Cocktail	Nominated	
2013	Star Guild Awards	Best Actress in a Supporting Role	Cocktail	Nominated	
2013	International Indian Film Academy Awards	Best Supporting Actress	Cocktail	Nominated	
2013	ETC Bollywood Business Awards	Most Profitable Debut – Female	Cocktail	Nominated	
2016	BIG Star Entertainment Awards	Most Entertaining Actress in a Comedy Film	Happy Bhag Jayegi	Nominated	
2025	Bollywood Hungama Style Icons	Most Stylish Dynamic Performer of the Year – Female	—N/a	Won	
