= Do You Wanna Partner =

2025 series by Archit Kumar and Collin D'Cunha

- Promotional poster
- Genre: Comedy drama
- Created by: Mithun Gongopadhyay; Nishant Nayak
- Written by: Nandini Gupta; Aarsh Vora; Mithun Gongopadhyay
- Directed by: Archit Kumar; Collin D'Cunha
- Starring: Tamannaah Bhatia; Diana Penty
- Country of origin: India
- Original language: Hindi
- No. of seasons: 1
- No. of episodes: 8

Production
- Executive producers: Somen Mishra; Archit Kumar
- Producers: Karan Johar; Adar Poonawalla; Apoorva Mehta
- Running time: 35–46 minutes
- Production company: Dharmatic Entertainment

Original release
- Network: Amazon Prime Video
- Release: 12 September 2025

Do You Wanna Partner is an Indian Hindi-language comedy drama series that premiered on Amazon Prime Video on 12 September 2025. Produced by Dharmatic Entertainment, it is directed by Archit Kumar and Collin D'Cunha and stars Tamannaah Bhatia and Diana Penty as two friends launching a craft beer startup in a male-dominated industry. The series explores female entrepreneurship, friendship, and resourcefulness, with an ensemble cast including Nakuul Mehta, Jaaved Jaaferi, Neeraj Kabi, Shweta Tiwari, Rannvijay Singha, Ayesha Raza Mishra and Sufi Motiwala.

== Synopsis ==
Shikha and Anahita, two friends, launch a craft beer business in urban India, navigating challenges in a male-dominated industry, including skeptical families, investors, and bureaucratic hurdles. The series blends humor and social commentary, highlighting their friendship and ingenuity as they pursue personal and professional growth.

== Cast ==
Adapted from the source media:

- Tamannaah Bhatia as Shikha Roy Chowdhury
  - Jazlyn Tanwani as Young Shikha
- Diana Penty as Anahita Makujina
- Nakuul Mehta as Bobby Bagga, a brewmaster
- Jaaved Jaaferi as Dylan Thomas, an actor hired to play David Jones
  - Archak as Young Dylan
- Neeraj Kabi as Vikram Walia, chairman of Silver Tusk Spirits
- Shweta Tiwari as Laila Singh, a money lender
- Rannvijay Singha as Kabir, Shikha's live-in partner
- Ayesha Raza Mishra as Radha Roy Chowdhury, Shikha's mother
- Sufi Motiwala as Firdaus Makujina, Anahita's brother
- Indraneil Sengupta as Sunjoy Roy Chowdhury, Shikha's father
- Lokesh Mittal as Juggy
- Sarabjeet Singh as Sartaj
- Neeraj Sood as Darshan Vora
- Koel Purie as Malini Mathur
- Shaji Choudhary as Premnath Kakinath Tokas aka Tokas Pehalwan
- Vidya Malvade (cameo)
- Anupam Mittal (cameo)
- Pradeep Kabra as Sampath

== Production ==
Produced by Karan Johar, Adar Poonawalla, and Apoorva Mehta under Dharmatic Entertainment, the series was created by Mithun Gongopadhyay and Nishant Nayak, with scripts by Nandini Gupta, Aarsh Vora, and Gongopadhyay. Archit Kumar and Collin D'Cunha directed, with Kumar and Somen Mishra as executive producers. Filming took place in Delhi, Mumbai and Kolkata.

== Episodes ==
Season	Episodes	Originally released
1	8	September 12, 2025

=== Season 1 (2025) ===
Episode	Title	Directed By	Written By	Date of Broadcast
1	"Bootstrap"	Archit Kumar, Collin D'Cunha	Nandini Gupta, Aarsh Vora, Mithun Gongopadhyay	12 September 2025
When Shikha's employer is taken over by Vikram Walia, the beer tycoon who ruined her father's business, she drowns her frustrations over drinks with her friend Anahita. After Anahita faces her own corporate betrayal, the duo decides to launch a rival beer brand to challenge Walia's empire.
2	"USP"	Archit Kumar, Collin D'Cunha	Nandini Gupta, Aarsh Vora, Mithun Gongopadhyay	12 September 2025
Shikha and Anahita dive into their entrepreneurial journey, recruiting a quirky brewmaster to their team. Facing dismissive investors and bureaucratic hurdles, they uncover an unexpected key to overcoming their challenges.
3	"Marketing"	Archit Kumar, Collin D'Cunha	Nandini Gupta, Aarsh Vora, Mithun Gongopadhyay	12 September 2025
The arrival of their enigmatic mentor, David Jones, transforms Shikha and Anahita's prospects, securing key deals. However, maintaining the myth of David's existence becomes increasingly difficult as his reputation grows uncontrollably.
4	"Brand Ambassador"	Archit Kumar, Collin D'Cunha	Nandini Gupta, Aarsh Vora, Mithun Gongopadhyay	12 September 2025
A financial crisis pushes Shikha and Anahita into a risky alliance with the dubious Laila. When Laila insists on meeting the elusive David Jones, the duo scrambles to find someone to embody their fictional mentor.
5	"The Launch"	Archit Kumar, Collin D'Cunha	Nandini Gupta, Aarsh Vora, Mithun Gongopadhyay	12 September 2025
The Jugaaro beer launch electrifies Delhi, with Dylan stepping up as David Jones. But when Walia disrupts the event and Dylan reveals a shocking secret, Shikha and Anahita must navigate a cascade of crises.
6	"Silent Partner"	Archit Kumar, Collin D'Cunha	Nandini Gupta, Aarsh Vora, Mithun Gongopadhyay	12 September 2025
Jugaaro's rise to fame secures a major music festival deal, but Walia's latest attack threatens everything. As Shikha contemplates a perilous deal with Laila, romantic sparks at the festival add new complications.
7	"Friction"	Archit Kumar, Collin D'Cunha	Nandini Gupta, Aarsh Vora, Mithun Gongopadhyay	12 September 2025
Jugaaro's success unravels as secrets spill out. Anahita's hidden romance and Shikha's risky dealings come to light, fracturing their partnership, while Dylan is caught in the crossfire of their crumbling trust.
8	"Pivot"	Archit Kumar, Collin D'Cunha	Nandini Gupta, Aarsh Vora, Mithun Gongopadhyay	12 September 2025
With time running out to settle debts with Laila, Shikha faces a heart-wrenching choice. She and Anahita set aside their conflicts for a final, high-stakes effort to save Jugaaro, but their dream hangs in the balance.

== Release ==
Do You Wanna Partner premiered on Amazon Prime Video on 12 September 2025.
