= Banjo (2016 film) =

2016 Indian film by Ravi Jadhav

- Theatrical release poster
- Directed by: Ravi Jadhav
- Written by: Kapil Sawant; Nikhil Mehrotra; Ravi Jadhav
- Produced by: Krishika Lulla
- Starring: Riteish Deshmukh; Nargis Fakhri
- Cinematography: Tapan Tushar Basu
- Edited by: Rameshwar S. Bhagat
- Music by: Songs: Vishal–Shekhar; Background Score: Sourav Roy
- Production company: Eros International
- Distributed by: Vashu Bhagnani (Pooja Ent. Films)
- Release date: 23 September 2016
- Running time: 140 min
- Country: India
- Language: Hindi
- Box office: est. ₹13.24 crore

Banjo is a 2016 Indian Hindi-language musical drama film, directed by Ravi Jadhav and produced by Krishika Lulla under the banner of Eros International. Principal photography began at the end of January 2016 and the film was released on 23 September 2016. Riteish Deshmukh and Nargis Fakhri starred in the film. The film received mixed reviews upon its release and was declared a flop at the box office.

== Plot ==
Mickey (Luke Kenny) is an American, temporarily based in Mumbai, who is in search of an instrumentalist capable of playing the (Indian) banjo. While trying to contact his music festival aspirant friend Christina (Nargis Fakhri), he comes across a local concert organised by a band of poor friends: five of them, led by Taraat (Riteish Deshmukh), who, unknown to Mickey, is the right match for him and Christina to show up at the festival. Christina, upon arrival in Mumbai, is forced to seek out odd jobs and portray Mumbai as dirty, but when, through a local MLA, she meets Taraat, who falls in love with her at first sight, she begins recognising the city as a good place. Taraat is at loggerheads with the leader of an underpaid rival band, who frames him wrongly for the assassination of the MLA who had introduced Taraat to Christina. By that time, in a twist of fate, Christina, while trying to chase the sounds of a banjo being perfectly played, discovers it is Taraat, and convinces him.

Following the assassination, Taraat is disowned by his friends, who accuse him of committing a crime, under what is obviously a false impression. However, when the rival band's lead musician admits his mistake, the friends get back together. Finally, they are given a chance by popular music baron Shamin Nair (Mohan Kapoor). However, shortly after Christina returns to the States, Nair humiliates Taraat, who threatens Nair and dares him to steal the show. When the band makes an entry, Nair is convinced of the band's power as it plays a sway-away song based around Lord Ganesha. Finally, after Mickey sends a recording of the song to Christina, Taraat is contacted by her to come to the US to attend the festival.

== Cast ==
- Riteish Deshmukh as Nandkishore/Taraat
- Nargis Fakhri as Christina a.k.a. Chris
- Dharmesh Yelande as Grease
- Aditya Kumar as Paper
- Ram Menon as Vajya
- Mahesh Shetty as Pakkaya
- Luke Kenny as Mickey a.k.a. Mic
- Mohan Kapoor as music baron Shamin Nair
- Anand Ingale

== Reception ==
=== Critical response ===
Banjo received mixed reviews from critics. The Times of India rated the film 3.5/5, writing that "If you are familiar with Mumbai's working-class neighbourhoods, where the hearts of the poor are bigger than the pay packages of those residing in the mushrooming high-rises, you'll be able to notice the beauty of Banjo. It also makes you respect the street musicians a little more." Hindustan Times rated the film 3/5, stating that "there's a lot to like in Riteish Deshmukh film." Koimoi.com rated the film 2/5, writing that "Banjo is easily passable. Why would you waste your money to watch Nargis’ acting and Riteish juggling between his Lai Bhaari an Rockstar character. Rediff.com rated the film 2/5, writing that it has "nothing much to beat about." NDTV rated the film 1.5/5, writing that "Riteish Deshmukh's film is a pale shadow of Rock On!!." The Indian Express rated the film 0.5/5, writing that "Riteish Deshmukh, Nargis Fakhri film has no redeeming features."

=== Box Office ===
==== India ====
The film's first weekend produced a net collection of ₹5.92 crore. In the next four days, the film collected ₹2.03 crore, which took its first week collection to a total of ₹7.95 crore. The film's net collection from India is ₹8.80 crore while its grossing in India is ₹12.22 crore (US$1.3 million).

==== Overseas ====
The film collected ₹15 lakh (US$16,000) from North America (USA & Canada), ₹3 lakh (US$3,100) from Australia and ₹84 lakh (US$87,000) from New Zealand.

The film's worldwide lifetime grossing is ₹13.24 crore (US$1.4 million).

== Soundtrack ==
Banjo

Soundtrack album by Vishal–Shekhar
- Released: 23 August 2016
- Recorded: 2016
- Genre: Feature film soundtrack
- Length: 25:22
- Language: Hindi
- Label: Eros Now
- Producer: Krishika Lulla

The background score for the film was composed by Sourav Roy. The soundtrack album of Banjo consists of seven songs composed by Vishal–Shekhar with lyrics written by Amitabh Bhattacharya. The music rights are acquired by Eros Music. The first song of the film "Bappa" was released on 18 August 2016. The Song "Bappa" and "Om Ganapataye Namah Deva" become most popular songs in Ganesh Utsav in 2016. The full music album was released on 23 August 2016.Even today, this film is remembered on the performance of Ritesh Deshmukh.

| No. | Title | Singer(s) | Length |
|---|---|---|---|
| 1. | "Rada" | Vishal Dadlani, Nakash Aziz, Shalmali Kholgade | 2:57 |
| 2. | "Udan Choo" | Hriday Gattani | 3:32 |
| 3. | "Pee Paa Ke" | Vishal Dadlani, Nakash Aziz | 3:07 |
| 4. | "Bappa" | Vishal Dadlani, Shekhar Ravjiani | 3:19 |
| 5. | "Rehamo Karam" | Ajay Gogavale | 2:30 |
| 6. | "Om Ganapataye Namaha Deva" | Nakash Aziz, Vishal Dadlani | 2:47 |
| Total length: | | | 25:22 |

== See also ==
- ABCD (franchise)
