= Shahid Mallya =

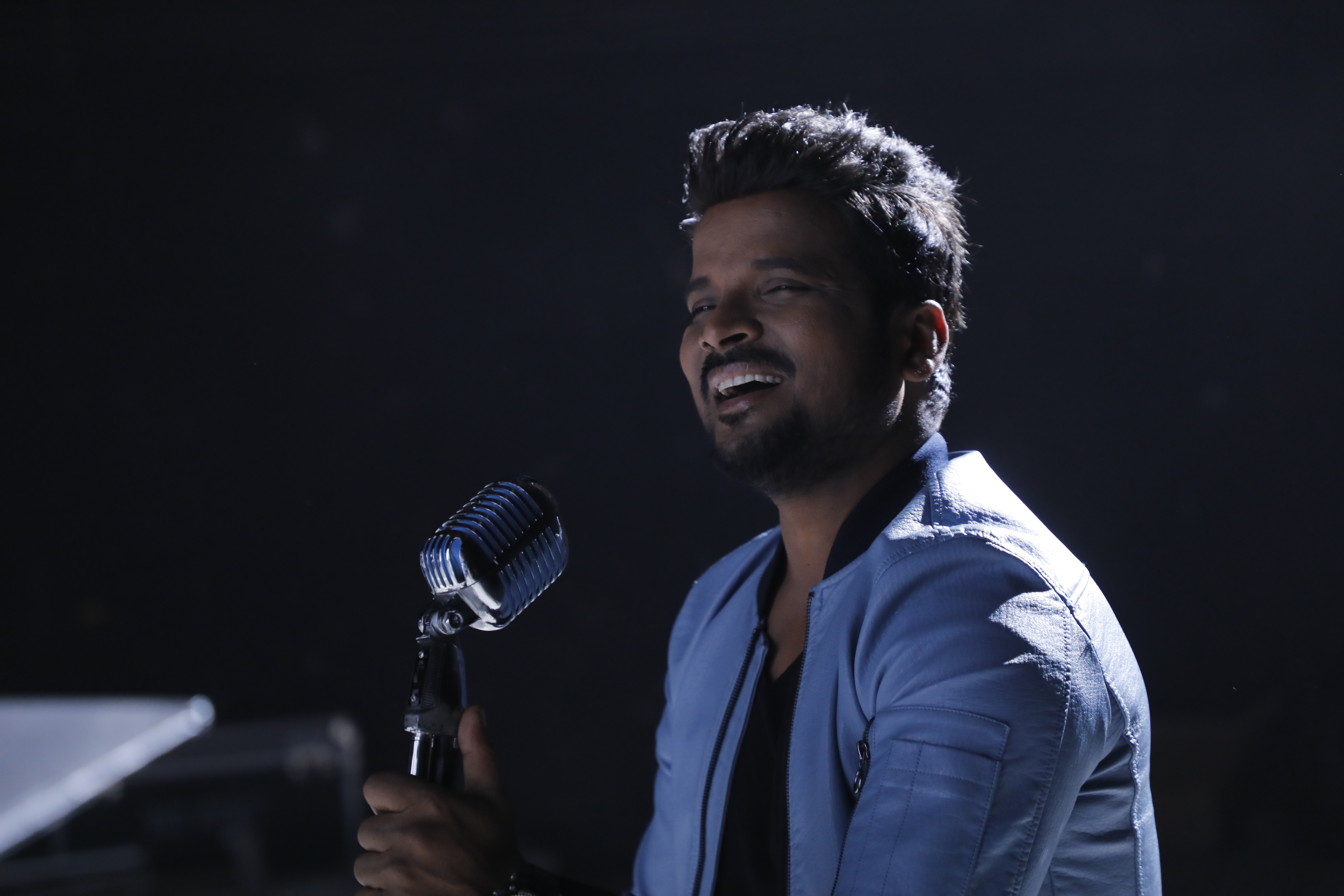
- Shahid Mallya

Background information
- Born: August 19, 1992 (age 34); Sri Ganganagar, Rajasthan, India
- Origin: Mumbai, Bangalore
- Genre: Playback Singing
- Occupation: Singer
- Instrument: Vocals
- Years active: 2010–present
- Website: www.twitter.com/shahidmaliya

Shahid Mallya is an Indian playback singer who has sung in various films. He prominently sings Hindi, Punjabi and Telugu songs.

== Career ==
Initially performing playback singing for Indian TV serials, Mallya debuted in Bollywood with the song "Gurbani" from the film Yamla Pagla Deewana.

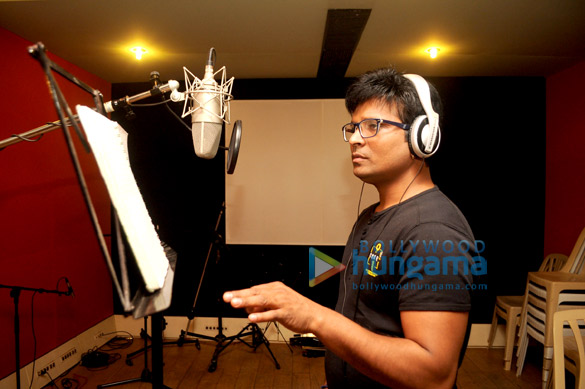
Shahid Mallya recording a song for a film.

His big break came when his friend, lyricist Kumaar, recommended him to Pritam, who had him sing Rabba Main To Mar Gaya Oye and Ik Tu Hi Tu for Pankaj Kapur's directorial debut Mausam.

== Film songs ==
Key
†	Denotes films that have not yet been released

Year	Film	Song	Composer(s)	Co-singer(s)	Ref.
2011	Yamla Pagla Deewana	"Gurbani"	Sanjoy Chowdhury		
2011	Mausam	"Rabba Main Toh Mar Gaya Oye"	Pritam		
2011	Mausam	"Ik Tu Hi Tu Hi (Reprise)"	Pritam		
2011	Mere Brother Ki Dulhan	"Do Dhaari Talwaar"	Sohail Sen	Shweta Pandit	
2011	Thank You	"Khushiyan Da Mela"	Pritam	Ashish Pandit	
2011	Sahi Dhandhe Galat Bande	"Naino Waali Whisky"	Siddharth-Suhas		
2011	Be Careful	"Love Technology"	Siddharth-Suhas	Sasha Tirupati	
2012	Sadda Adda	"Sarphira"	Shamir Tandon		
2012	Student of the Year	"Kukkad"	Vishal–Shekhar	Nisha Mascarenhas, Marianne D'Cruz	
2012	Dil Tainu Karda Ae Pyar	"Kyun Gayee"	Jaidev Kumar		
2012	Dil Tainu Karda Ae Pyar	"Sona Sahiba"	Jaidev Kumar		
2012	Bittoo Boss	"Mann Jaage Sari Raat"	Gajendra Verma		
2012	Luv Shuv Tey Chicken Khurana	"Luv Shuv Tey Chicken Khurana"	Amit Trivedi	Harshdeep Kaur	
2013	Inkaar	"Inkaar Theme (English Version)"	Shamir Tandon	Monica Dogra	
2013	Inkaar	"Inkaar Theme (Hindi Version)"	Shamir Tandon	Papon	
2013	Rajdhani Express	"Koi Umeed (Indian)"	Lahu-Madhav		
2014	Dedh Ishqiya	"Kya Hoga"	Vishal Bhardwaj	Master Saleem, Jazim Sharma	
2014	Shaadi Ke Side Effects	"Tauba Main Vyah Karke Pachtaya"	Pritam	Poorvi Koutish	
2014	Gunday	"Saaiyaan"	Sohail Sen		
2014	Gunday	"Bolo Na"	Sohail Sen		
2014	Gunday	"Mann Kunto Maula – Bangla Version"	Sohail Sen	Javed Ali	
2014	Gunday	"Mann Kunto Maula (Classical) – Bangla Version"	Sohail Sen	Javed Ali	
2014	2 States	"Iski Uski"	Shankar–Ehsaan–Loy	Akriti Kakkar, Shankar Mahadevan	
2015	Crazy Cukkad Family	"Crazy Cukkad Family"	Siddharth-Suhas	Shipra Goyal	
2015	Crazy Cukkad Family	"Party Ka Hero"	Siddharth-Suhas	Kumaar, Shipra Goyal	
2015	Guddu Rangeela	"Sahebaan"	Amit Trivedi	Chinmayi Sripada, Amit Trivedi	
2015	Guddu Rangeela	"Guddu Rangeela (Remix)"	Amit Trivedi	Divya Kumar	
2015	Phantom	"Nachda"	Pritam		
2016	Udta Punjab	"Chitta Ve"	Amit Trivedi	Babu Haabi, Bhanu Pratap	
2016	Udta Punjab	"Ikk Kudi"	Amit Trivedi		
2016	Udta Punjab	"Hass Nach Le"	Amit Trivedi		
2016	Dishoom	"Toh Dishoom"	Pritam	Raftaar	
2016	Happy Bhag Jayegi	"Happy Oye"	Sohail Sen	Harshdeep Kaur	
2017	Jab Harry Met Sejal	"Radha"	Pritam	Sunidhi Chauhan	
2017	Fukrey Returns	"Bura Na Mano Bholi Hai"	Sumeet Bellary	Gandharv Sachdev	
2017	Guest iin London	"Dil Mera"	Raghav Sachar	Ash King, Prakriti Kakar	
2017	Wo India Ka Shakespeare	"Aas Meri"	Sachin Pathak		
2017	Sweetiee Weds NRI	"Wedding"	Palash Muchhal	Palak Muchhal	
2018	Manmarziyaan	"Daryaa"	Amit Trivedi	Ammy Virk	
2018	Manmarziyaan	"Sacchi Mohabbat"	Amit Trivedi	Jonita Gandhi	
2018	Happy Phirr Bhag Jayegi	"Koi Gal Nayi"	Sohail Sen	Piyush Mishra, Mudassar Aziz	
2018	Namaste England	"Dhoom Dhadaka"	Mannan Shaah	Antara Mitra	
2019	Fraud Saiyaan	"Mashoor Hazoor – E – Aala"	Sohail Sen	Solo	
2019	Fraud Saiyaan	"Laides Paan"	Sohail Sen	Mamta Sharma, Shadab Faridi	
2021	FCUK: Father Chitti Umaa Kaarthik	"Hey Hudiya"	Bheems Ceciroleo		
2021	Velle	"Udd Chaliyan"	Jasleen Royal		
2022	Atithi Bhooto Bhava	"Gulmohar"	Prasad S		Zee5 film
2022	Qala	"Rubaiyaan"	Amit Trivedi	Sireesha Bhagavatula	Netflix film
2022	Qala	"Shauq"	Amit Trivedi	Swanand Kirkire, Sireesha Bhagavatula	Netflix film
2022	Qala	"Nirvau Nirvir"	Amit Trivedi		Netflix film
2022	Qala	"Udd Jayega"	Sagar Desai		Netflix film
2023	Bloody Daddy	"Baari Barsi"	Julius Packiam	Harsimram Singh	JioCinema film
2023	Rocky Aur Rani Kii Prem Kahaani	"Kudmayi (Film Version)"	Pritam		
2024	Tera Kya Hoga Lovely	"Dil Khona"	Amit Trivedi	Yashita	
2025	Shaila	"Nachle"	Sunil Sharma	Suhani Thapa	
2025	Jaat	Touch Kiya	Thaman S	Madhubanti Bagchi	
2025	Kalidhar Laapata	Amit Trivedi	Jubin Nautiyal, Deepali Sathe		

== Non-Film songs ==
Year	Album	Song	Composer(s)	Lyrics	Note	
2021	"Wajood"	Shourya Kumar Lal		Seemu Dandyan & Aarvi	Also Featured in the Video	
2019	Chehra Noor Sa	Chehra Noor Sa	Siddharth Kasyap	Shabbir Ahmed	Featuring Mrunal Jain & Mruga	Directed by Anshul Vijayvargiya
2019		"Bas Aitbaar Chahida"	Hitesh Panghaniya		Hitesh Panghaniya	[Humara Platform]
2019	Gumnaam Shayar	"Dukh"	Gopi Sidhu		Gopi Sidhu	
2018	Mere Saaiyan	"Mere Saaiyan"	Shourya Kumar Lal		Seemu Dandyan	
2018	Jalwa-E-Jubilee	"Jalwa-E-Jubilee"	Ayaz Ismail	Richa Sharma (singer)	Seema Saini	Akshat Gaur
2016	Disco Stud	"Disco Stud "	Arif khan		Gopi Sidhu	
2015	Vadhaiyaan	"Vadhaiyaan"	Abhijit Vaghani			
2013	Bani – Ishq Da Kalma	"Bani – Ishq Da Kalma"	Udbhav Ojha, Gagan Riar, Sarabh Nayar	Harshdeep Kaur		
2011	Phoenyx Phase 1	"Teriyan Khairan"	Bharat Goel			
2011	Phoenyx Phase 1	"Challa Laung Da Laskhara"	Bharat Goel			
2020		"Tenu Vekhi Jaavan"	Bharat Goel	Asees Kaur	Rashmi Virag	Released on Times Music
2020		"Aadat Hai Tu"	Dharmendra Bhadouriya		Dharmendra "Ehsaas"	
2020		"Tu Laazmi"	Anjana Ankur Singh		Rajesh Nishad	
2020		"Teri Arzoo"	Sukumar Dutta	Neha Karode	Deeplina Deka, Ava Dihingia, Udayan Duwarah	Released on Times Music
2022	"Kyun"	"Kyun"	Shourya Kumar Lal	Aarvi, Samir Gwalia, Surya Samudra		
2022		"Mere Baba"	Subham Sahu	Subham Sahu	Father's Day Special Song	Released on Jinni Music

== Accolades ==
Year	Award Ceremony	Category	Recipient	Result	Ref.(s)
2012	4th Mirchi Music Awards	Upcoming Male Vocalist of The Year	"Rabba Main Toh Mar Gaya Oye" from Mausam	Nominated	
2024	69th Filmfare Awards	Filmfare Award for Best Male Playback Singer	"Kudmayi (Film Version)" from Rocky Aur Rani Kii Prem Kahaani	Nominated	
