= Bloody Daddy =

2023 Indian film by Ali Abbas Zafar

- Official release poster
- Directed by: Ali Abbas Zafar
- Written by: Ali Abbas Zafar; Aditya Basu; Siddharth–Garima
- Based on: Sleepless Night (2011) by Frédéric Jardin
- Produced by: Jyoti Deshpande; Sunir Khetarpal; Gaurav Bose; Himanshu Kishan Mehra; Ali Abbas Zafar; Sushil Choudhary
- Starring: Shahid Kapoor; Ronit Roy; Rajeev Khandelwal; Sanjay Kapoor; Diana Penty
- Cinematography: Marcin Laskawiec
- Edited by: Steven H. Bernard
- Music by: Songs: Badshah; Anuj Garg; Julius Packiam; Background Score: Julius Packiam
- Production companies: Jio Studios; AAZ Films; Offside Entertainment; Sradvn Production
- Distributed by: JioCinema
- Release date: 9 June 2023
- Running time: 121 minutes
- Country: India
- Language: Hindi
- Budget: ₹60 crore

Bloody Daddy is a 2023 Indian Hindi-language action thriller film directed by Ali Abbas Zafar, who co-wrote the film with Aditya Basu and Siddharth–Garima, and produced by Jio Studios. It features Shahid Kapoor, Sanjay Kapoor, Diana Penty, Ronit Roy, Rajeev Khandelwal, Ankur Bhatia and Vivan Bhatena. It is a remake of the 2011 French film Sleepless Night.

Bloody Daddy was released on 9 June 2023 in JioCinema and received mixed-to-positive reviews from critics. At the 2023 Filmfare OTT Awards, Bloody Daddy received 7 nominations, including Best Actor in a Web Original Film (Kapoor).

== Plot ==
Sumair Azad, an NCB officer, and his deputy Jagadish Prasad alias Jaggi in Gurgaon, busts a drug deal, which leads the drug lord Sikandar to kidnap Sumair's son Atharva in exchange for retrieving the bag of cocaine. With no other option left, Sumair agrees to retrieve the bag from the NCB headquarters and bring it to his club for the exchange. Sumair's act of hiding the bag in the men's toilet is noticed by his assistant Aditi Rawat, who suspects Sumair's involvement in drug smuggling. Aditi informs her superior Sameer Singh and begin to pursue Sumair, taking away the bag of cocaine from the toilet in the process.

After finding that the bag of cocaine has gone missing, Sumair decides to return a bag containing packets of flour to Sikandar, thinking that he and his cronies, including Hameed Shaikh, will not realise the difference. Unfortunately, Sikandar and Hameed soon find out that Sumair had cheated them and decide to kill him. Caught between Sikandar's gang along with Aditi and Sameer, Sumair confronts Aditi and tells her that he has been working undercover to expose Sameer and Jaggi's involvement in helping Sikandar to smuggling drugs. Sumair then rescues Atharva without Sikandar's knowledge and Sikandar is arrested by Aditi and Sameer.

While taking Sikandar to prison, Aditi finds out that Sumair placed Jaggi's mobile phone in her jacket. Aditi reads the messages on the phone and realizes that Sumair had been speaking the truth all along. Sameer tries to resist arrest and kills Sikandar in the process, but Sameer is eventually brought to justice. While talking with Aditi about exposing more drug dealers, Atharva finds drug packets in Sumair's car, revealing that Sumair is also involved in drug smuggling.

During the credits, Atharva keeps quiet about this and leaves for a short trip with Sumair.

== Cast ==
- Shahid Kapoor as Sumair Azad
- Sanjay Kapoor as Hameed Shaikh
- Diana Penty as Aditi Rawat
- Ronit Roy as Sikandar Chowdhary
- Rajeev Khandelwal as Sameer Singh
- Ankur Bhatia as Vikram Chowdhary aka Vicky
- Vivan Bhathena as Dharmesh Chowdhary aka Danny
- Zeishan Quadri as Jagdish Prasad aka Jaggi
- Sartaaj Kakkar as Atharva Azad
- Diwakar Solanki as ATM Guard
- Veto Swarn as Nnamdi 'Morris' Odu
- Rais Baluch as Kannu
- Saurabh Chauhan as J. K. Rathore
- Suparna Moitra as Riya Sahni
- Sachin Verma as Akash Kumar Chopra
- Shaurya Kohli as Navpreet
- Naseer Mohammad as Thief
- Mukesh Bhatt as Rafique Shaikh aka Rafa
- Amy Aela as Aisha

== Production ==
Bloody Daddy was filmed in 36 days amid the COVID-19 pandemic.

== Music ==
Bloody Daddy

Soundtrack album by Badshah, Anuj Garg and Julius Packiam
- Released: 8 June 2023
- Genre: Feature film soundtrack
- Length: 12:19
- Language: Hindi
- Label: Times Music

Official audio
- Bloody Daddy - Full Album on YouTube

The film's music is composed by Badshah, Anuj Garg and Julius Packiam.

Track listing
No.	Title	Lyrics	Music	Singer(s)	Length
1.	"Likhna Mitana"	Dinesh Pant	Anuj Garg	Neha Karode	3:50
2.	"Real Talk"	GD47	Julius Packiam	GD47	2:55
3.	"Issa Vibe"	Badshah	Badshah	Badshah, Payal Dev	2:28
4.	"Baari Barsi"	Harsimran Singh	Julius Packiam	Shahid Mallya, Harsimran Singh	3:06
Total length:					12:19

== Release ==
The film digitally premiered on 9 June 2023 on JioCinema.

== Reception ==
Renuka Vyavahare of The Times of India gave 3.5/5 stars and wrote "Bloody Daddy doesn’t take itself too seriously. It’s an absurdly funny, unpretentious action- crime thriller that's brutal and brave." Anindita Mukherjee of India Today gave 3.5/5 stars and wrote "Even though Bloody Daddy doesn’t offer the audience elements that they’ve never seen before, the film definitely stands out in the sea of action thrillers. It’s high on thrill, action and full of Shahid Kapoor!"

Titas Chowdhary of News18 gave 3.5/5 stars and wrote "If you want to unwind after a tiringly long week and blow off steam, Bloody Daddy is the option. It is light, breezy, fun, fizzy and pleasing to the eyes. Our biggest complaint remains, a spectacle film of this scale and elaborate canvas deserved a theatrical release." Bollywood Hungama gave 3/5 stars and wrote "Bloody Daddy works due to Shahid Kapoor’s performance, entertaining first half and some fine action and dramatic sequences, but suffers due to a weak and unimaginative second half."

Aishwarya Vasudevan of OTTplay gave 2.5/5 stars and wrote "Bloody Daddy has all the elements of a blockbuster, and it almost hits the mark. But the storyline is what fumbles it, making it a long and stretchy film." Vinamra Mathur of Firstpost gave 2.5/5 stars and wrote "Bloody Daddy tries to possess a certain amount of madness to keep the momentum going. It’s like that car whose driver is enjoying his rashness, taking all the bumpiness in between, and reaching the finishing line all battered and bloody."

Saibal Chatterjee of NDTV gave 2/5 stars and wrote "Playing a variation on Farzi's defiantly amoral middle-class rebel, the lead actor assumes the persona of another anti-hero who plays the game by his own rules." Shubhra Gupta of The Indian Express gave 2/5 stars and wrote "Shahid Kapoor-starrer has all the ingredients of a pacey thriller but despite the occasional burst, it slumps back into a been-there-seen-this category."

== Accolades ==
Year	Award ceremony	Category	Nominee / work	Result	Ref.
2023	Filmfare OTT Awards	Best Actor in a Web Original Film	Shahid Kapoor	Nominated	
2023	Filmfare OTT Awards	Best Original Dialogue (Web Original Film)	Ali Abbas Zafar; Aditya Basu	Nominated	
2023	Filmfare OTT Awards	Best Background Music (Web Original Film)	Julius Packiam	Nominated	
2023	Filmfare OTT Awards	Best Production Design (Web Original Film)	Rajnish Hedao; Snigdha Basu; Sumit Basu	Nominated	
2023	Filmfare OTT Awards	Best Cinematographer (Web Original Film)	Marcin Laskawiec	Nominated	
2023	Filmfare OTT Awards	Best Editing (Web Original Film)	Steven H. Bernard	Nominated	
2023	Filmfare OTT Awards	Best Sound Design (Web Original Film)	Dileep Subramaniam	Nominated	
