= Manorama Six Feet Under =

2007 Indian thriller film

- Movie poster for Manorama Six Feet Under
- Directed by: Navdeep Singh
- Written by: Devika Bhagat; Navdeep Singh
- Produced by: Ketan Maroo
- Starring: Abhay Deol; Raima Sen; Gul Panag
- Cinematography: Arvind Kannabiran
- Edited by: Jabeen Merchant
- Music by: Jayesh Gandhi; Raiomond Mirza
- Distributed by: Shemaroo Entertainment
- Release date: 21 September 2007
- Running time: 138 minutes
- Country: India
- Language: Hindi

Manorama Six Feet Under is a 2007 Indian crime thriller film directed and co-written by Navdeep Singh. The film features Abhay Deol, Raima Sen, and Gul Panag in the lead roles. The film was released on 21 September 2007. It follows an amateur detective in a small sleepy town from Rajasthan who finds himself caught in a web of lies, deceit and murder. The film is based on an American neo-noir film, Chinatown (1974). The makers of Manorama Six Feet Under acknowledged the inspiration from the original by playing the sequence where Jack Nicholson's character gets his nose slashed on the main character's (Satyaveer) television.

== Plot ==
The film opens with a narrative about a nondescript town called Lakhot in Rajasthan, India. The narrator is Satyaveer Singh Randhawa, a down-on-his-luck public works assistant engineer. He compares Lakhot – dry, desolate and despondent – to the general downturn in his own life. As he returns to his irritable and nagging wife Nimmi and their young son, we learn that Satyaveer has just been implicated in a small bribery scandal at work. Satyaveer is also an aspiring writer whose only novel Manorama sank without a trace, laments about how he had once wished to be famous but is now resigned to a banal and unremarkable existence.

One night, a woman claiming to be the wife of Irrigation Minister and ex-Maharaja P. P. Rathore visits him. A fan of his detective novel Manorama, she hires him to photograph Rathore's alleged affair. Satyaveer accepts and spies on Rathore, capturing images of a woman being turned away at his estate. He hands over the film to the woman and confides in his brother-in-law, Brij Mohan, a local cop, who warns him something feels off. That night while he returns home drunk, he meets the lady again in front of his house, and says "remember, My name is Manorama and I'm 32 years old".

He decides to investigate further. He finds out that the lady who claimed to be Manorama was social worker connected with the canal the minister was planning to make and lived with a roommate, Sheetal, who worked in the orphanage run by the minister. When he tries to investigate Manorama's room, he bumps into Sheetal, who refuses to talk with him. Satyaveer is later set upon by thugs; they turn out to be the same men who chased Manorama on the night of her death, and they want to find out what she told him that night. Satyaveer tells them what was told to him after getting his two fingers broken and his motorbike is stolen. Satyaveer later uncovers that Manorama's death was an accident; she was hit by a truck as she fled her pursuers.

Satyaveer goes back to Manorama's room, however this time finds that thugs had ruined the entire place and injured Sheetal. She is scared but somehow warms to him and asks if she can stay with him for a few days. Seeing as Nimmi has returned to Rohtak (her parents’ house) for Diwali, Satyaveer agrees. Sheetal moves in for a little while. Around this time, Satyaveer attends a rally function with Rathore in attendance. He follows Rathore and discovers that Rathore receives regular medication from a doctor for an unknown ailment. He also spots the woman who visited him on the night Satyaveer took the photos.

He follows the woman and makes contact with her. She lives with the doctor Anil Poddar. She turns out to be Sameera Rathore, the illegitimate daughter of Rathore. She was trying to get Rathore to accept her as a daughter. He and Sheetal discuss what to do next and they almost kiss but his wife calls him and he takes her call immediately remembering his marriage. Satyaveer begins piecing the parts together. He receives a call from Dr. Anil's residence asking him to meet however, when Satyaveer visits the doctor, he finds that the doctor and Sameera have both been brutally murdered. But their house help mistakes Satyaveer as the murderer so he fleds the scene with his scooter. He calls Sheetal frantically but no one answers the call so he runs to the children's home where he discovers that Sheetal has actually been dead for around 8–10 days and the woman staying with him was an imposter. She calmly reveals herself as Neetu, a concubine of Rathore, and directs him to hand over the photos to Rathore.

Satyaveer returns to confront Rathore, where he learns that Manorama was not after the photos of the affair instead she had a separate roll that she herself washed in the studio. Further investigation reveals a bigger shock which leads to him vomiting and unable to digest the reality. He confronts Rathore, exposing him as a pedophile exploiting children from the local orphanage, which resulted in the death of Deepthi (a child shown missing in the beginning of the movie). Manorama and the real Sheetal, both tied to the orphanage, had uncovered his crimes and were silenced.

Neetu tries to seduce Satyaveer on Rathore's orders, but he resists. He also reveals that Manorama and Dr. Poddar were siblings. Knowing Rathore had terminal lung cancer, they fed him placebos to keep him alive long enough to accept Sameera as his heir and when Rathore dies the properties will go to the sole heir Sameer and through her, to Manorama and Anil. But now, it's too late. Rathore's wife, wheelchair bound, hearing the full story, laughs in relief.

As Satyaveer is walking out, he slaps one of the goons who is asthmatic, and the goon starts choking on a peanut, but Satyaveer continues walking by carefree. He remarks that there is a god up there, and he will listen one day, all you have to ask is "Is anyone there"?. He gets away in the pink taxi and reunites with his wife and son at the terminal.

== Cast ==
- Abhay Deol as Satyaveer Singh Randhawa
- Raima Sen as Sheetal / Neetu
- Gul Panag as Nimmi Randhawa
- Kulbhushan Kharbanda as Minister P. P. Rathore
- Sarika as Manorama Rathore
- Vinay Pathak as Brijmohan
- Nawazuddin Siddiqui as Chhaila
- Brijendra Kala as Bihari Lal
- Yana Gupta as herself (brief friendly appearance)
- Nakshatra as Raju, son of Satyaveer
- Poonam Gibson as Sameera Rathore
- Devinder Madan as Mrs. P. P. Rathore, wife of the Minister
- Jogi as Fauji
- Rajesh M as Dr. Anil Poddar
- Shabnam Wadhera as Head-mistress of the orphanage
- Tejpal Singh as Attendant of P. P. Rathore

== Production ==
A significant portion of the film, particularly the interior scenes set in Rajasthan, was filmed in Mandawa. The scenes featuring Abhay Deol and Vinay Pathak were predominantly shot there.

== Critical reception ==
The film received mostly positive reviews from critics. Raja Sen of Rediff.com gave it 3.5 out of 5 stars calling it "a well-executed thriller". Khalid Mohamed of Hindustan Times gave the film a 3/5 rating calling Abhay Deol "an actor who has matured and radiates intelligence". Times of India gave it a 3/5 rating, calling it "a sparkling gem, off mainstream masala, for the choosy film buff". Rajeev Masand gave the movie 2 out of 5 stars and wrote, "It’s unlikely that Manorama Six Feet Under will appeal to all, mostly because it unfolds at a pace slower than a melting candle. But skillfully directed by debutant Navdeep Singh, the film works as a show reel for the talents of everyone involved."

== Soundtrack ==
=== Track listing ===
1. "Dhokha" (4:12) - Richa Sharma
2. "Dhundla Jo Sama Bandh" (5:04) - Kailash Kher
3. "Tere Sawalon Ke" (5:43) - Roop Kumar Rathod, Mahalakshmi Iyer
4. "Woh Bheege Pal" (6:49) - Jayesh Gandhi
5. "Woh Bheege Pal" (6:48) - Zubeen Garg
6. "Woh Bheege Pal" (Remixed by Akbar Sami) (6:18) - Jayesh Gandhi
