= Raanjhanaa =

2013 Indian film by Aanand L. Rai

- Theatrical release poster
- Directed by: Aanand L. Rai
- Written by: Himanshu Sharma
- Produced by: Krishika Lulla; Aanand L. Rai
- Starring: Dhanush; Sonam Kapoor; Abhay Deol; Swara Bhaskar
- Cinematography: Natarajan Subramaniam; Vishal Sinha
- Edited by: Hemal Kothari
- Music by: A. R. Rahman
- Production company: Colour Yellow Productions
- Distributed by: Eros International
- Release date: 21 June 2013
- Running time: 146 minutes
- Country: India
- Language: Hindi
- Budget: ₹36 crore
- Box office: est. ₹105 crore

Raanjhanaa (transl. 'Beloved one') is a 2013 Indian Hindi-language romantic drama film directed by Aanand L. Rai and written by Himanshu Sharma. The film is produced by Krishika Lulla under the banner of Eros International. It stars Dhanush (in his Hindi film debut), Sonam Kapoor, Abhay Deol, Mohammed Zeeshan Ayyub and Swara Bhaskar. The film was released on 21 June 2013 worldwide, while the Tamil dubbed version Ambikapathy was released a week later.

The background score and songs were composed by A. R. Rahman, and the lyrics of the tracks were penned by Irshad Kamil. Considered as a cult film, it received positive reviews from the critics and became a box office success. A spiritual sequel, titled Tere Ishk Mein, was released on 28 November 2025.

== Plot ==
Kundan, the son of a Tamil Brahmin family in Varanasi, falls in love with Zoya, a Muslim girl, and tries hard to woo her. Due to his antics, Zoya's parents suspect that she likes a Hindu boy and send her away to Aligarh. In her absence, Kundan gets involved with and endears himself to her family. Zoya eventually goes to JNU in Delhi and falls for student leader Akram Zaidi.

Eight years later, Zoya returns home, reuniting with Kundan who asks her to marry him. She rejects him again and reveals her relationship with Akram. Kundan is furious but agrees to help convince her parents to let her marry Akram. He promises Zoya that he too will marry someone else and forget about her. He then goes to his childhood friend Bindiya, who’s been in love with him for years, and wedding preparations begin.

On Zoya's wedding day, Kundan finds out that Akram is actually Jasjeet, a Sikh man lying about his identity. Enraged, he reveals this to Zoya’s family. In the fallout, Jasjeet is brutally beaten up, causing Zoya to attempt suicide. While tending to them, Kundan misses his own wedding to Bindiya, and his family disowns him. Trying to redeem himself, he takes Zoya to Jasjeet's home. Upon their arrival, they discover that Jasjeet eventually died from his wounds, and Kundan runs away, overwhelmed with guilt.

Now homeless, Kundan wanders without purpose until he encounters a stranger, who advises him to do the right thing. Determined, he looks for Zoya and finds her back at her university, spearheading Jasjeet's political party. Hoping to atone for his actions and win her back, Kundan joins the party, helping the members with tough issues, and rises up the ranks to become their candidate. Zoya however refuses to forgive him, resenting him for taking Jasjeet's place, and secretly plots with the Chief Minister to have him assassinated.

While delivering a speech at a party event, Kundan is shot in the assassination attempt. Stricken by conscience, Zoya confesses to her involvement in the plot during a press conference with the Chief Minister, and later finds out that Kundan was aware of it yet still went to the event. Shocked, she rushes to the hospital to be with him. In his dying moments, Kundan muses about being reborn in Varanasi and falling in love with Zoya again.

== Cast ==
- Dhanush as Kundan Shankar
  - Naman Jain as young Kundan
- Sonam Kapoor as Zoya Haider
  - Saniya Anklesaria as young Zoya Haider
- Abhay Deol as Akram Zaidi / Jasjeet Singh Shergill (extended cameo appearance)
- Mohammed Zeeshan Ayyub as Murari Gupta
  - Ansh as young Murari Gupta
- Swara Bhaskar as Bindiya Tripathi
  - Payal Bhojwani as young Bindiya Tripathi
- Ishwak Singh as Shahid, a doctor and Zoya's prospective groom
- Shilpi Marwaha as Rashmi Shergill, Jasjeet's sister
- Suraj Singh as Anand
- Kumud Mishra as Inzamaam Qalab-E-Haider a.k.a. Guruji, Zoya's father
- Deepika Amin as Zoya's mother
- Urmillla Sharma as Kundan's mother
- Vipin Sharma as Shivraman Shankar, Kundan's father
- Rahul Chauhan as Inspector Ashok Tripathi, Bindiya's father
- Reena Kumar as Bindiya's mother
- Tejpal Singh as Ishar Singh Shergill, Jasjeet and Rashmi's father
- Dimple as Jasjeet and Rashmi's mother
- Sujata Kumar as Chief Minister
- Arvind Gaur as Guptaji
- Shailendra Singh as Guptaji's secretary
- Shivi as Shivi
- Amarnath Sharma as Junait
- Rahul Tanwar as Acchan
- Uptal Jha as police inspector
- Nisha Jindal as a student of JNU
- Mannveer Choudharry as a student of JNU
- Ginny Singh as a JNU activist

== Production ==
=== Development ===
In late 2011, Shahid Kapoor and Sonakshi Sinha were signed as the lead pair for the film. Supposedly, they dropped out of the project to work on Prabhudeva's next R... Rajkumar. In late January 2012, actor Dhanush, making his Bollywood debut, signed onto the film for the character of Kundan. The actor reportedly underwent training for fluency in Hindi language to obtain the role. Actress Sonam Kapoor was signed on for the role of the female lead after March 2012 after failed negotiations with Asin. In April 2012, the actress and the director visited the JNU Campus of Delhi for the former to imbibe more for her role. Sonam also attended acting workshops with prominent theatre director Arvind Gaur to learn the nuances of street theatre. The director chose to cast actors who could also play younger versions of themselves. In an interview the director stated the film was an intense love story, and its characters would travel to Delhi, Punjab and Chennai, and that actor Abhay Deol would be seen in a special appearance in the film. Urmila Sharma, well known for her Hindi TV serial roles was signed to play the character of Kundan's mother in the film. Initially, Aditi Rao Hydari was supposed to play the role of Kundan's childhood friend but she opted out due to lack of availability, being replaced by Swara Bhaskar.

=== Characters ===
Dhanush Kundan who has a deep obsession with his hometown of Banaras and Zoya. It depicts him a young boy and a teen who turns into a sensitive adult. Sonam Kapoor quoted her character as, “'Zoya' is childlike and unpredictable. She can be cold and at the same time, objective. She has every quality that makes her desirable to a man." In an interview, Kapoor revealed that for playing the role of a school girl in the film, she drew inspiration from the character Jaya Bachchan played in the 1971 film Guddi. Actor Abhay Deol as Akram plays a secure yet confident university student, socialist and a budding politician.

=== Filming ===
After main casting announcements, filming was substantially delayed; the reason was speculated to be composer A. R. Rahman's music being denied outright by the film director. Filming officially began in Varanasi, India in early September 2012 and continued for 40 days in and around the city. As per reports, the leading duo were also seen playing the role of 17-year-old teenagers. In mid-September 2012, the schedule of filming was put on hold as actor Dhanush fell ill on the sets in Varanasi. While filming in October 2012, the actor injured his shoulder during the filming of an action sequence for his Tamil outing Maryan. The consequences led to the scheduled shooting of dance sequences to be postponed and were shot in Varanasi on 19 December 2012. On 4 November 2012, Sonam Kapoor and Abhay Deol shot the song "Tu Mun Shudi" at India Gate, Delhi, and their dialogue scenes were shot at the Indian Institute of Mass Communication campus in Delhi by early December 2012. Permission to shoot inside was denied to the director by the college authorities. So, the unit shot some scenes in Amity International School, Noida. To avoid footage leaks, over a hundred potential crew members were made present at the filming venue. Certain filming was also done in Gurgaon and Faridabad. The title track of the film was shot on 27 December 2012. The final schedule of filming began in Delhi on 7 January 2013. In March 2013, the film's crew shot several scenes at the Pataudi Palace in Haryana over two days. After the completion of writing work, Actress Sonam Kapoor required the dialogue in Devnagri, hence "Sanjay Bhardwaj" (Dev) appointed to do the said job for her.

== Music ==
The music and the background score for the film was composed by A. R. Rahman. The soundtrack's original version has lyrics penned by Irshad Kamil whereas the Tamil version was written by Vairamuthu. In an interview with Hindustan Times, Rahman stated that he had emphasised the folk-classical genre as the film brings out a fascination for Benaras through the music and hence, most of the songs are character-driven. In all, the soundtrack album has nine original tracks. The original version of the soundtrack was released on the co-branded record labels Sony Music and Eros Music on 27 May 2013 and the Tamil version on 17 June 2013.

== Marketing ==
On 10 May 2013, a grand event was held at a set resembling Varanasi at Film City in Goregaon, Mumbai. The lead actors made their entry riding a chariot and performed the title track of the film. The producer stated that the event was promoted in Banarasi style so as to represent the essence of the film and its setting. The film's music was promoted at the Radio Mirchi Studios in Mumbai on 27 May 2013. Dressed in typical South Indian attire, Dhanush and Sonam Kapoor promoted the Tamil version, Ambikapathy in Chennai. The leading duo also promoted the film in Mumbai, Delhi, Ahmedabad, Lucknow and Jaipur from mid-May to June 2013.

== Release ==
The first look of the characters in the film was revealed as a poster with no credits and film name on the day of Holi 2013. The first theatrical trailer was released on 24 April 2013. The Hindi version of the film released worldwide on 21 June 2013 with the estimated number of release screens being 1,000. The film opened to an occupancy of 50–55%, the highest compared to other Bollywood films that released on the same date.

== Critical reception ==
The film received positive response from the critics who praised the writing, direction, performances, cinematography and soundtrack although the second half received some criticism. Critic Komal Nahta responded positively and said, "On the whole, Raanjhanaa is an interesting, entertaining and a fairly different love story. It is like heady wine and its effect will only grow." Rajeev Masand of CNN-IBN wrote, "For its immensely entertaining first half, a winning score by AR Rahman, but most of all for Dhanush, this is a film that's worth your time. I'm going with three out of five for Raanjhanaa. It's not perfect, but it'll do." Resham Sengar of Zee News gave the film 4 out of 5 stars and summarised "Raanjhanaa is a love story that does not fall within the confines of a clichéd Bollywood romance." Taran Adarsh of Bollywood Hungama gave the film 3.5 out of 5 and stated, "On the whole, Raanjhanaa encompasses romance and myriad emotions most wonderfully, besides bravura performances and a popular musical score from the maestro." Adarsh also called it "a film that touches the core of your heart" and said it was "definitely worthy of a watch". At NDTV, Saibal Chatterjee gave it 3.5/5 and opined in the review, "The film defies the expectations of the audience at several crucial junctures and holds out absolutely no apologies for springing abrupt surprises. A love story with a huge difference that benefits no end from a clutch of exceptional performances." Sukanya Verma of Rediff Movies gave 3 out of 5 stars and claimed, "Raanjhanaa isn't easy viewing. Kundan and Zoya aren't easily likeable. They have flaws. They make mistakes. Blunders, really but Rai shows them for what they are; he never paints a pretty picture. And this brutal honesty coupled with a commanding Dhanush is what works." Meena Iyer of The Times of India claimed, "Raanjhanaa is a love story that has a Shakespearean touch and is mounted on a lavish scale". She noted, "You may not like this film if you cannot digest brooding love stories", and gave it 3.5 out of 5. Kaushik Rmesh of Planet Bollywood gave the film an 8 on 10 and summarised, "A realistic romance that brims with impressive elements (including and especially the enchanting music), Raanjhanaa is surely a winner at the end and must be watched for its unconventional handling and freshness". Anupama Chopra of Hindustan Times gave the film 3.5 out of 5 stars and said, "The dialogues by Himanshu Sharma are the highlight of the film. The lines are pithy, earthy and wonderfully funny. Snaking his camera through the streets of Benares, director Aanand L Rai creates an intimate and lived milieu. AR Rahman’s music, especially the gorgeous Tum Tak, layers the narrative further."

Nabanita of One India gave the film 3.5 out of 5 and wrote, "Raanjhanaa works, and yes, the movie has maximum possibilities to strike the right chords amongst the audience, only and only because of Dhanush and his heart-touching performance." Rachit Gupta of Filmfare called the film a "great love story" and concluded, "Grab a ticket, clutch the hand of your loved one and go fall in love. This time with great cinema". Critics at Indicine gave a score of 65 out of 100 and summarised, "The intentions of Aanand L Rai seem genuine. He wants to show us the world where he grew up in, wants to romanticize the feeling of nostalgia and unrequited love." Tushar Joshi writes for DNA India, "Raanjhanaa works because of Dhanush's ability to make you believe in his love for Zoya. You might not agree with his approach, but deep down you cheer and root for him each time Zoya plants a slap on his face." At Deccan Chronicle, Khalid Mohamed mentioned, "Raanjhanaa: Playing ping pong with love", and gave it three stars out of five. India Today rated the film 3/5 and judged, "Raanjhanaa harks back to the way Bollywood used to make love stories once upon a time. With some imagination, the effect would have been nostalgic, too." Shubha Shetty Saha of Mid-Day assigned 3.5/5 to the film and praised actor Dhanush and stated, "And then the second half is when the pace dips, the sincerity of the storyline gets somewhat hazy and the film gets wee bit disappointing. An absolutely believable one-sided romance takes a slightly deceptive political drama twist and I am not sure if that is what you wanted it to be. It is unpredictable, yes, but not in a great, believable way." At Mumbai Mirror, Karan Anshuman pointed, "Raanjhanaa flows like good poetry. It is arguably the best love story of the year so far, the kind of film others in the genre should aspire.".

On the contrary to above, critic Mayank Shekhar wrote, "His (Dhanush) character is supposed to be gifted with great inter-personal skills. It doesn't quite show." Shubhra Gupta of The Indian Express gave it 2.5 out of 5 and mentioned, "Raanjhanaa is a film which is all of a piece in its engaging first half, and a good Bollywood launchpad for Dhanush. Makes me want to see what he will do in his second pass." At Emirates 24/7, Sneha May Francis said, "While music maestro AR Rahman tunes the track, and leaves us occasionally cheerful, the moments are far too few to erase the horrid after effects of this movie." Critic Manohar Basu at Koimoi stated, "However a sluggish screenplay and lurching script makes Raanjhanaa a half baked effort and hence gets a 3/5 from me." Sudhish Kamath of The Hindu concluded, "A dream debut for Dhanush even if the film gets stuck in its messy political subtext that kills the romance."

Overseas

At The Hollywood Reporter, Lisa Tsering left the film unrated and asserted, "The fact that the film marks the Hindi-language debut of South Indian star and YouTube superstar Dhanush is bound to draw interest at the box office, though Rai's firm refusal to play by the rules of the typical Bollywood love story may make it hard to sustain momentum."

== Controversies ==
=== Ban in Pakistan ===
Pakistan's Central Board of Film Censors (CFBC) banned the film before its scheduled release in Pakistan. Chief executive officer of IMGC Global Entertainment Amjad Rasheed, the importer of Raanjhanaa, revealed that he received a letter from the CBFC with directives to shelve the film's release which stated that the film portrays an inapt image of a Muslim girl (played by Sonam Kapoor) falling in love with a Hindu man and having an affair with him.

=== Allegations of altered climax ===
In 2025, the film's climax was altered with the help of AI for a re-release, which drew criticism from Rai and he distanced himself from this version. Eros, on the other hand, rejected these allegations and claimed that it was instead "a respectful reinterpretation and not a tampering of the original." Dhanush revealed that he had objected to the use of AI to generate an alternate ending, feeling the move "stripped the film of its very soul" but the "concerned parties" still went ahead with it. He felt the usage of AI to alter films was setting a bad precedent and threatens not only the integrity of storytelling, but the "legacy of cinema" as well.

== Box office ==
=== Domestic ===
The first-day collection was estimated at ₹81.5 million (US$850,000). The film performed well at multiplexes outside the metros in places like Indore, Kanpur, Banaras, regions of CP Berar, Central India and states like Uttar Pradesh, Bihar and Rajasthan. On its opening day, it grossed more than 500,000 in the city of Lucknow itself. On Saturday, a day just after release, collections rose to ₹68.0 million (US$710,000). The film had a growth rate of 40–45%, making its total first weekend collection ₹201 million (US$2.1 million). Within a week of its release, its gross surpassed ₹340 million (US$3.5 million) and Box Office India declared it a "Hit". After two weeks of release, the film had collected ₹520 million (US$5.4 million) at the box office. Raanjhanaa also had the fourth-highest second week collections of the year 2013. It grossed Rs 75 million in its third week, taking its total domestic overall collections to ₹600 million (US$6.2 million) and worldwide collections nearing to a remarkable mark and becoming the second highest-grosser of 2013 at the time of its release. The film ended its run with an estimated ₹615 million (US$6.4 million) nett in India.

=== Overseas ===
Raanjhanaa grossed around ₹15.0 million (US$160,000) internationally on its first weekend. Its first weekend gross in the United Kingdom amounted to £72,000, while in North America it made $415,000. The film collected $145,000 in the UAE and $46,000 in Australia. Raanjhanaa also grossed $1.55 million in ten days. Further, the film receded its total collections and dropped around $1.8 million by 17 July 2013.

== Awards and nominations ==
Note – The lists are ordered by the date of announcement, not necessarily by the date of ceremony/telecast.

Awards and nominations
Distributor	Date announced	Category	Recipient	Result	Ref.
BIG Star Entertainment Awards	18 December 2013	Most Entertaining Romantic Film	Anand L. Rai	Nominated	
BIG Star Entertainment Awards	18 December 2013	Most Entertaining Debut Actor - Male	Dhanush	Nominated	
BIG Star Entertainment Awards	18 December 2013	Most Entertaining Music	A. R. Rahman	Nominated	
Zee Cine Awards	14 January 2014	Best Actor in a Supporting Role– Female	Swara Bhaskar	Won	
Screen Awards	14 January 2014	Best Actor in a Supporting Role (Female)	Swara Bhaskar	Won	
Screen Awards	14 January 2014	Best Actor (Popular Choice)	Dhanush	Nominated	
Screen Awards	14 January 2014	Best Actor (Male)	Dhanush	Nominated	
Screen Awards	14 January 2014	Best Actor in a Supporting Role (Male)	Mohammed Zeeshan Ayyub	Nominated	
Screen Awards	14 January 2014	Best Actress (Popular Choice)	Sonam Kapoor	Nominated	
Screen Awards	14 January 2014	Best Cinematography	Natty Subramaniam; Vishal Sinha	Nominated	
Screen Awards	14 January 2014	Best Music	Jay Dudhat (Flute)	Nominated	
Screen Awards	14 January 2014	Best Background Score	Jay Dudhat (Flute)	Nominated	
Screen Awards	14 January 2014	Best Costume	Payal Saluja	Nominated	
Screen Awards	14 January 2014	Best Sound Design	Arun Nambiar	Nominated	
Screen Awards	14 January 2014	Production Design	Wasiq Khan	Nominated	
Apsara Film & Television Producers Guild Award	16 January 2014	Best Actor in a Supporting Role	Abhay Deol	Nominated	
Apsara Film & Television Producers Guild Award	16 January 2014	Best Screenplay	Himanshu Sharma	Nominated	
Apsara Film & Television Producers Guild Award	16 January 2014	Best Story	Himanshu Sharma	Nominated	
Apsara Film & Television Producers Guild Award	16 January 2014	Best Dialogue	Himanshu Sharma	Nominated	
Apsara Film & Television Producers Guild Award	16 January 2014	Best Music	A. R. Rahman	Nominated	
Apsara Film & Television Producers Guild Award	16 January 2014	Best Performance in a Comic Role	Mohammed Zeeshan Ayubb; Swara Bhaskar	Nominated	
ETC Bollywood Business Awards	18 January 2014	Highest Grossing Debut (Male)	Dhanush	Won	
Filmfare Awards	20 January 2014	Best Debut (Male)	Dhanush	Won	
Filmfare Awards	20 January 2014	Best Director	Anand L. Rai	Nominated	
Filmfare Awards	20 January 2014	Best Film	Anand L. Rai	Nominated	
Filmfare Awards	20 January 2014	Best Actor in a Leading Role (Female)	Sonam Kapoor	Nominated	
Filmfare Awards	20 January 2014	Best Actor in a Supporting Role (Female)	Swara Bhaskar	Nominated	
Filmfare Awards	20 January 2014	Best Music	A. R. Rahman	Nominated	
Global Indian Music Awards (GiMA)	20 January 2014	Best Engineer (Film Album)	R. Nitish Kumar	Nominated	
Global Indian Music Awards (GiMA)	20 January 2014	Best Background Score	A. R. Rahman	Nominated	
Global Indian Music Awards (GiMA)	20 January 2014	Best Film Album	A. R. Rahman	Nominated	
Global Indian Music Awards (GiMA)	20 January 2014	Best Playback Singer (Female)	Shreya Ghoshal (for the song "Banarasiya")	Nominated	
International Indian Film Academy Awards	26 April 2014	Best Actress In A Supporting Role	Swara Bhaskar	Nominated	
International Indian Film Academy Awards	26 April 2014	Male Debutant Star	Dhanush	Won	

== Spiritual sequel ==
On 21 June 2023, the 10th anniversary of Raanjhanaa's theatrical release, a spiritual sequel, titled Tere Ishk Mein, was announced via a teaser, which featured Dhanush returning in the lead role. Kriti Sanon joined the cast of the film as a female lead, replacing Sonam Kapoor in January 2025.
