= Ashu Sharma =

Indian actor (born 1982)

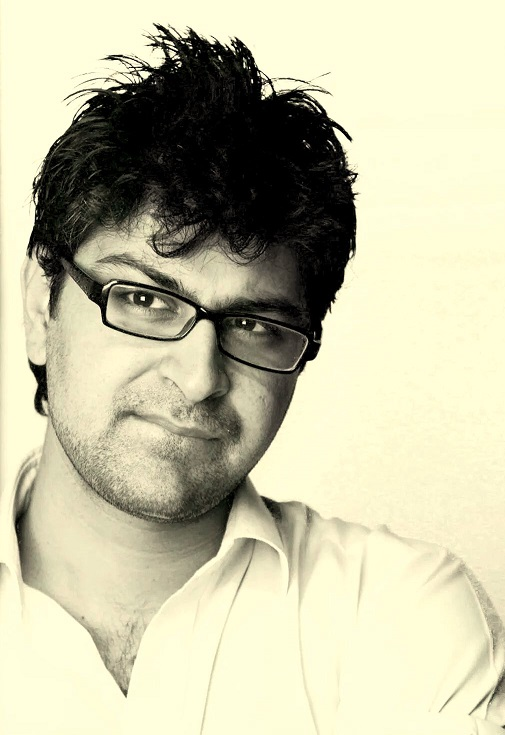
- Sharma in 2016
- Born: 26 May 1982 (age 44); Patiala, Punjab, India
- Occupation: Actor
- Years active: 2009–present

Ashu Sharma is an Indian television and film actor known for portraying the character of Satyendra Bharadwaj in Colors TV's second-longest-running series, Sasural Simar Ka. He also appears in Sony SAB's Tera Yaar Hoon Main.

== Career ==
=== Film ===
Sharma started his film career with the black comedy drama Dev.D (2009), where he played a Canadian boy, and followed it by starring in the thrillers Teen Patti and No One Killed Jessica, both in 2011. After a four-year gap, he appeared in the 2016 action comedy Happy Bhag Jayegi.

=== Television ===
In 2011, Sharma appeared in Colors TV's Sasural Simar Ka, which marked his television debut. The show stars Dipika Kakar and Avika Gor as two sisters who marry two rich brothers, played by Shoaib Ibrahim and Manish Raisinghan. Later in 2015, Sharma made a cameo appearance in &TV's female buddy show Dilli Wali Thakur Gurls. He left Sasural Simar Ka in 2017. From 2018 to 2019, Sharma appeared in the series Patiala Babes.

== Filmography ==
=== Film ===
List of film appearances, with year, title, and role shown
Year	Title	Role	Notes
2009	Dev.D	Canadian boy	
2010	Teen Patti	Rammi	
2011	No One Killed Jessica	Lucky Gill	
2012	Surkhaab	Manpreet	
2016	Happy Bhag Jayegi	Winkle	
2016	Dishoom	Kamlesh bhai	
2018	Yamla Pagla Deewana Phir se	Preston	
2018	Missing	Nandlal	
2019	Fastey Fasaatey	Jugnu	
2020	Comedian	Ashwin Verma	

=== Television ===
List of television appearances, with year, title, and role shown
Year	Title	Role	Notes
2011–2017	Sasural Simar Ka	Satyendra "Sattu" Bharadwaj	
2015	Dilli Wali Thakur Gurls	Vicky	
2018	Kaleerein	Bittu Dhingra	
2018	Laado 2	Amrish	
2018–2019	Patiala Babes	Sukhwinder Chahal 'Sukhi'	52 episodes
2020–2022	Tera Yaar Hoon Main	Rajan Bansal	
2023–2024	Yeh Hai Chahatein	Jagdish Bajwa	
2025	Mannat – Har Khushi Paane Ki	Bobby Saluja	
2025	Jamai No. 1	Pramod Shrivastav	
2026–present	Yeh Rishta Kya Kehlata Hai	Nakul	
