= Howrah Bridge (1958 film) =

- The theatrical release poster of Howrah Bridge
- Directed by: Shakti Samanta
- Written by: Vrajendra Kaur; Ranjan Bose
- Produced by: Shakti Samanta
- Starring: Ashok Kumar; Madhubala
- Cinematography: Chandu
- Edited by: Dharamvir
- Music by: O. P. Nayyar
- Production company: Shree Shakti Films
- Distributed by: Shree Shakti Films
- Release date: 15 June 1958
- Running time: 153 minutes
- Country: India
- Language: Hindi
- Box office: ₹1.1 crore (equivalent to ₹115 crore or US$12 million in 2026)

Howrah Bridge is a 1958 Indian Hindi-language crime thriller film directed by Shakti Samanta. The music for the film was composed by O. P. Nayyar. The plot focuses on Prem Kumar (played by Ashok Kumar), a businessman from Rangoon, who travels to Calcutta to try to track down his brother's murderers. Madhubala stars as Edna, a cabaret dancer, in one of her most popular roles.

Howrah Bridge was a major critical and commercial success upon its release and has become a cult film over years. It has been specially noted for its soundtrack, which consists the chartbusters "Mera Naam Chin Chin Chu" and "Aaiye Meherbaan".

== Plot ==
Prem Kumar (Ashok Kumar) and his elder brother Madan (Chaman Puri) are looking after a successful business of their father in Rangoon. But Madan suddenly disappears with the family heirloom, a dragon embedded with precious stones and reaches Calcutta to sell it off. He falls prey to the designs of a few smugglers and pays with his life. Prem's father urges him to get back the heirloom and Prem in disguise of Rakesh comes to Calcutta from Rangoon. There he meets his father's trusted tangewala Shyamu (Om Prakash) who takes him to a hotel run by John Chang (Madan Puri) but then he is swiftly taken over by the seductress Edna (Madhubala) to her uncle Joe's (Dhumal) hotel, where he is looked after by her. Edna falls for him and reveals that her uncle, John Chang and their friend Pyarelal (K. N. Singh) are into illegal business. Having got a clue from Edna, Prem chases the culprits until finally he is framed by Pyarelal in the murder of John Chang.

Ultimately Prem gets his heirloom and his love and now wife Edna.

== Cast ==
- Ashok Kumar as Prem Kumar / Rakesh Sharma
- Madhubala as Edna
- K. N. Singh as Pyarelal
- Madan Puri as John Chang
- Om Prakash as Shyamu Tangewala
- Pachhi as Johann Josef Talwarkar
- Krishnakant
- Uma Dutt
- Surya Kumar
- Mauji
- Kundan
- Bhawan Sinha
- T.N Charlie
- Dhumal as Uncle Joe
- Sunder as Bhikharilal 'Bhiku'
- Kammo as Chhamia
- Brahm Bhardwaj as Prem & Madan's Father
- Chaman Puri as Madan
- Nirmal Kumar as CID Officer
- Mehmood as Wedding Dancer
- Minoo Mumtaz as Wedding Dancer
- Helen as Dancer In Song "Mera Naam Chin Chin Chu"
- Ratan Gaurang as waiter

== Production ==
In 1957, Samanta had a car accident in which he was severely injured. He spent many days in the hospital, and eventually developed the story of Howrah Bridge lying on the hospital bed. Soon after being discharged, Samanta contacted his friend and actor Ashok Kumar and narrated the story to him; Kumar liked it and agreed to the film.

A problem came up when Samanta told Kumar that he wants to cast a "top-notch" actress in the role of Edna. He had previously considered Nargis and Nimmi, but found them unfit for the character. He also had Madhubala's name in his mind, but her price was too high for the financially unstable Samanta. It was then when Kumar came in to help him. Kumar, who had previously worked with Madhubala in Mahal (1949) and Ek Saal (1957), went to her house and told her the film's story. Madhubala took an immediate liking to the character of a cabaret dancer, something which she had not done before. Upon learning that Samanta is reluctant to cast her due to her fees, she reduced it from ₹2,00,000 to just ₹1.25.

Except the climax, all other scenes of the film in which Howrah Bridge is shown were actually shot somewhere else, according to Madhubala's biographer Mohan Deep.

One of the scenes from the original film—Ashok Kumar kissing Madhubala on her cheek—was deleted by the censors, who found it "too sexy". Howrah Bridge was Samanta's first release under his banner Shakti Films, which he had set up in 1957.

== Soundtrack ==
The music was composed by O. P. Nayyar and lyrics were written by Qamar Jalalabadi and Hasrat Jaipuri. Upon the film's release, the soundtrack became very popular and was one of the biggest reasons of the film's success. The iconic number "Mera Naam Chin Chin Chu", sung by Geeta Dutt, brought fame to Helen, who was only 19 at the time. Another evergreen song of the album was "Aaiye Meharban", sung by Asha Bhosle, picturised on Madhubala.

The following songs are in Howrah Bridge:

#	Song	Singer(s)	Lyricist
1	"Main Jaan Gayi Tujhe Saiyan"	Shamshad Begum, Mohammed Rafi	Hasrat Jaipuri
2	"Yeh Kya Kar Dala Tune"	Asha Bhosle	Hasrat Jaipuri
3	"Aaiye Meharban"	Asha Bhosle	Qamar Jalalabadi
4	"Dekhke Teri Nazar Bekarar Ho Gaye"	Asha Bhosle	Qamar Jalalabadi
5	"Gora Rang, Chunariya Kali, Motiyonwali"	Mohammed Rafi, Asha Bhosle	Qamar Jalalabadi
6	"Mohabbat Ka Hath, Jawani Ka Palla, Subhanallah"	Mohammed Rafi, Asha Bhosle	Qamar Jalalabadi
7	"Eent Ki Dukki, Paan Ka Ikka"	Mohammed Rafi	Qamar Jalalabadi
8	"Mera Naam Chin Chin Chu"	Geeta Dutt	Qamar Jalalabadi

== Release ==
The film was released in Bombay at Novelty Theatre September 1958.

== Reception ==
=== Box office ===
According to trade analyst V. P. Sathe, writing for Swarajya, the film did "record collections" in Calcutta territory (now Kolkata) and grossed over ₹2.4 lakh within a week.

Howrah Bridge overall grossed ₹1.1 crore, with a net of ₹0.55 crore to become the ninth highest-grossing Bollywood film of 1958. According to Box Office India, the film was one of the biggest hits of the year.

=== Critical reception ===
Reviews in The Times of India (September 1958) described Howrah Bridge as a "routine crime film" but "very popular with cinegoers".

Uma Vasudeva of Thought found the film to be "western" due to its music and sets and Madhubala "beautiful most of the times".

The movie gained controversy for featuring siblings Mehmood and Minoo Mumtaz (children of actor Mumtaz Ali) dancing romantically.

== Legacy ==
The film's success established Shakti Samanta as a leading director; he later recalled: "We made a lot of money from re-print of the records and ... [the film] did really well, I came to be recognized as a hit film maker from Howrah Bridge onwards."

The song "Mera Naam Chin Chin Chu" was re-used in the 1988 film Salaam Bombay!.

Madhavi Pothukuchi of ThePrint took notice of the soundtrack and called "Aaiye Meherbaan" a showstopper, concluding that "O. P. Nayyar's music turned Howrah Bridge from a movie to a whole mood." Shoma Chatterji lauded Samanta's direction and called Howrah Bridge "one of the best crime thrillers on the Hindi screen".
