= Abhay Deol =

Indian actor (born 1976)

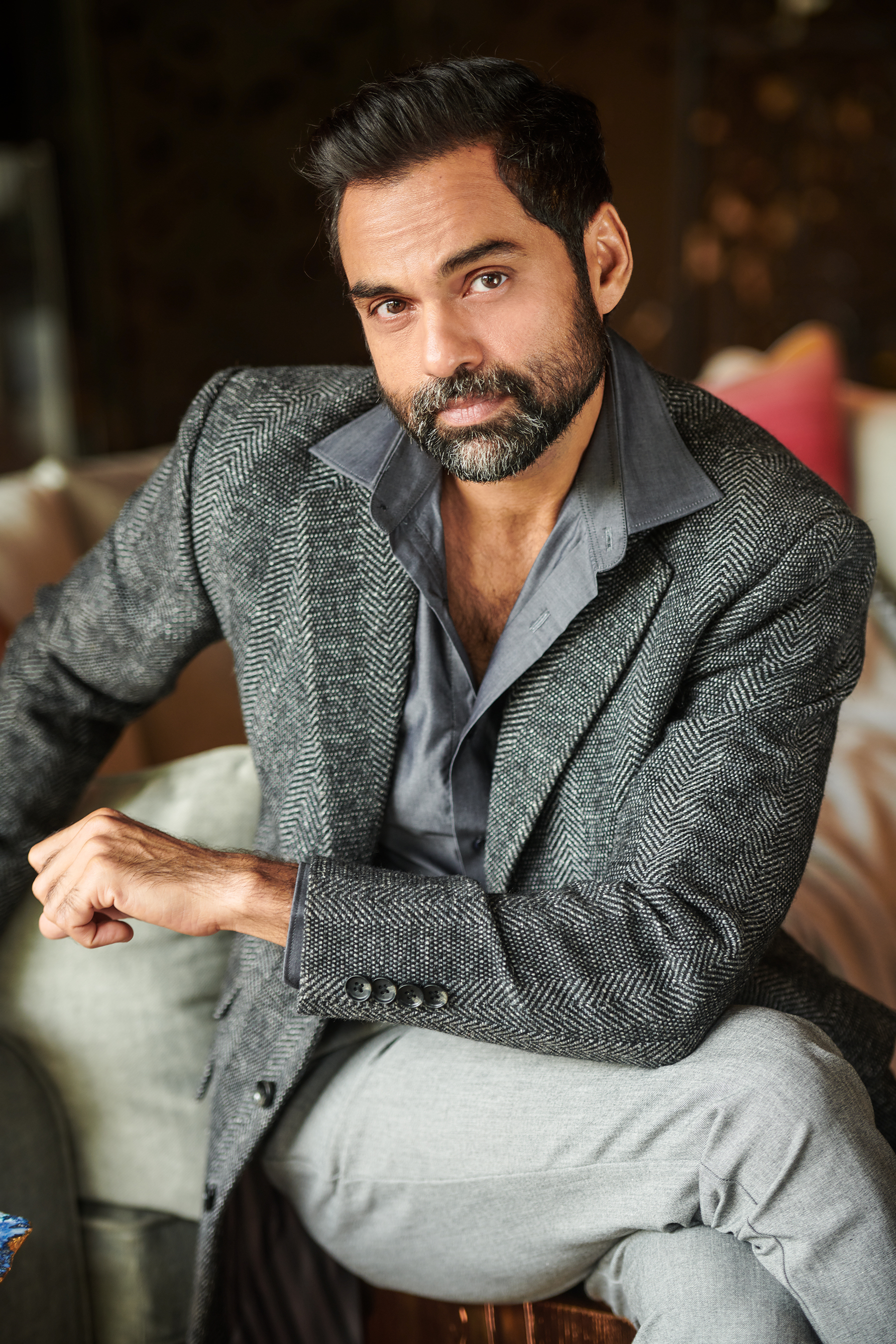
- Deol in 2021
- Born: 15 March 1976 (age 50); Bombay, Maharashtra, India
- Occupation: Actor
- Years active: 2005–present
- Relatives: Dharmendra (uncle); Sunny Deol (cousin); Bobby Deol (cousin); Esha Deol (cousin); Guddu Dhanoa (first cousin once removed)
- Family: See Deol family

Abhay Deol (born 15 March 1976) is an Indian actor who predominantly works in Hindi films. Born in the Deol family, he made his screen debut with Imtiaz Ali's romantic comedy Socha Na Tha (2005). Deol was praised for his performances in the independent films Manorama Six Feet Under (2007) and Oye Lucky! Lucky Oye! (2008). His breakthrough came in 2009 with a starring role in Anurag Kashyap's black comedy Dev.D, a modern-day adaptation of Devdas.

Deol had his biggest commercial success in Zoya Akhtar's ensemble film Zindagi Na Milegi Dobara (2011). His performance was well-received and earned him a nomination for Filmfare Award for Best Supporting Actor. Deol later appeared in independent films including the drama Road, Movie (2010) and the war film Chakravyuh (2012), while simultaneously working in commercially successful films including the romantic drama Raanjhanaa (2013), and the romantic comedy Happy Bhag Jayegi (2016). He has since starred in the Tamil film Hero (2019) and the Netflix drama series Trial By Fire (2023).

Deol is noted for his portrayal of complex characters on screen, and is vocal in his support for parallel cinema in India. Deol owns a production company, Forbidden Films, which he established in 2009. He is an active philanthropist and supports various NGOs.

== Early life ==
Deol was born on 15 March 1976 to Ajit Singh Deol and Usha Deol. He is the nephew of actor Dharmendra, and the first cousin of Sunny Deol, Bobby Deol, Esha Deol and Ahana Deol Vohra. He also has two sisters, Veerta Deol and Ritu Deol. His father, Ajit Deol, who died in 2015, was Dharmendra's younger brother and an actor-director in both Hindi and Punjabi cinema.

Abhay Deol stated in an interview with Rediff that he is into acting not because of his father, but because he was involved in theatre since school. "At 18, I decided to take the plunge. It took me 10 years because I didn't want to leave my education to get into films."

== Acting career ==
=== Work in independent films and breakthrough (2005–2013) ===
Deol made his film debut in the 2005 Imtiaz Ali's Socha Na Tha, a romantic comedy where he starred opposite Ayesha Takia. The film garnered mostly positive reviews from critics and was an average grosser at the box-office. Deol's performance in the film was well received. His second film role was 2006's romantic drama Ahista Ahista opposite Soha Ali Khan. Deol's first 2007 release was the ensemble comedy drama Honeymoon Travels Pvt. Ltd. which emerged as a box-office success. Deol had two more releases in the year, the crime film Ek Chalis Ki Last Local and the thriller Manorama Six Feet Under. The latter won the Best Film at the Mahindra Indo-American Arts Council Film Festival in New York City, and Deol won the Best Actor Award.

Deol's sole release of 2008 was dark comedy film Oye Lucky! Lucky Oye!. Directed by Dibakar Banerjee, the film had Deol portray a compulsive thief, Lovinder Singh a.k.a. Lucky, and the film's plot follows his exploits. Oye Lucky! Lucky Oye! was met with critical acclaim, but suffered heavily because of the timing of its release, a day after the 2008 Mumbai attacks, leading to widespread fear of crowded places.

Deol's breakthrough role came in 2009 when he portrayed the titular character in Anurag Kashyap's 2009 neo-noir film Dev.D, a modern-day adaptation of Sarat Chandra Chattopadhyay's classic Bengali romance novel Devdas. The idea behind the film was conceived by Kashyap during a conversation with Deol where the latter spoke about a man frequenting a Los Angeles strip club like a "modern day Devdas". Dev.D. received widespread attention for its distinct visual style, experimental soundtrack, and innovative narrative structure which was unprecedented for any Bollywood film. In a 4 out of 5 star review for The Times of India, Nikhat Kazmi deemed Deol's performance in the film as a "class act". Deol appeared alongside Tannishtha Chatterjee in Road, Movie. Deol made a cameo appearance for an Item number in the movie Tera Kya Hoga Johnny in 2010. In 2009, Deol launched a production company Forbidden Films, with Junction being the film to be picked up by the banner.

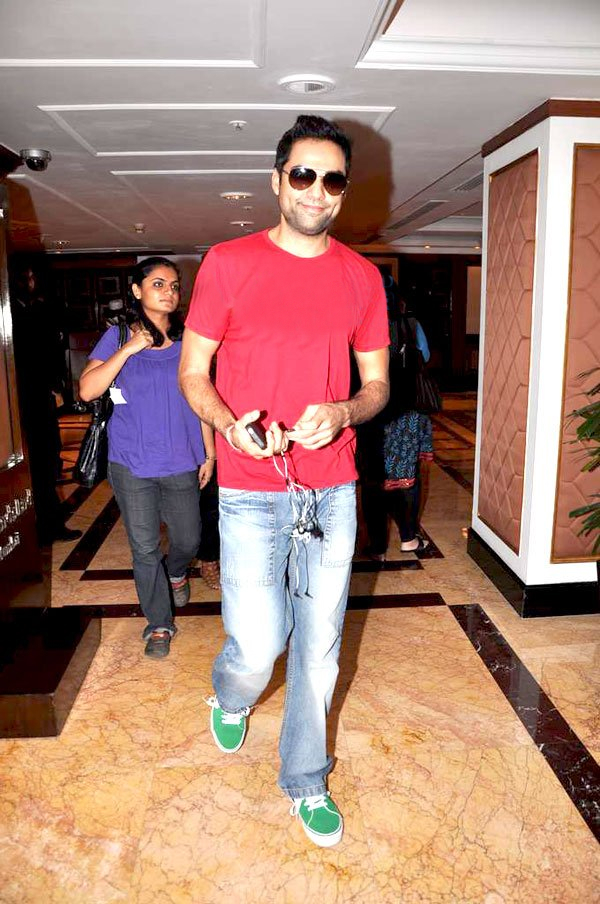
Deol promoting Zindagi Na Milegi Dobara at a UTV event

In 2010, he portrayed Arjun Burman, an investment banker opposite Sonam Kapoor's eponymous lead in the ensemble romantic comedy Aisha, which also starred Ira Dubey, Cyrus Sahukar, Amrita Puri, Anand Tiwari, Arunoday Singh and Lisa Haydon. In 2011, Deol starred in Zoya Akhtar's ensemble comedy-drama road film Zindagi Na Milegi Dobara alongside Hrithik Roshan, Farhan Akhtar, Katrina Kaif and Kalki Koechlin. The story follows 3 friends, who have been inseparable since childhood, had him play the role of Kabir, an architect. They set off to Spain on a bachelor trip for Kabir who is set to be married to Natasha, an interior designer played by Koechlin. He trained to be a deep-sea diver for the film which was filmed in Spain. The film opened to high critical acclaim and grossed ₹1.53 billion (US$16 million) worldwide, surpassing Dhoom 2 in the worldwide gross, becoming the ninth-highest worldwide-grosser of all time for a Bollywood film, at the time of its release. Zindagi Na Milegi Dobara won Best Film among other awards, and Deol received a nomination for Best Supporting Actor for his performance in the film.

Deol had two releases in 2012, both of which were political thrillers– Dibakar Banerjee's Shanghai and Prakash Jha's Chakravyuh. In the latter, Deol starred alongside Arjun Rampal as a police informer, but later gets involved in a Naxalite movement. The film received mixed reviews from film critics. Shanghai co-starring Emraan Hashmi and Kalki Koechlin was based on the French novel Z by Vassilis Vassilikos. The film opened to positive reviews and Deol's performance as a bureaucrat/IAS officer garnered much acclaim. Raja Sen of Rediff.com applauded Deol writing, "he wears his inscrutability thickly and delivers a strong performance". The film was a surprise hit and went on to gross over ₹200 million (US$2.1 million) in India.

=== Career expansion and fluctuations (2014–present) ===
In 2014, Deol hosted few episodes of Channel V's crime television series Gumrah: End of Innocence.

In 2021, Deol was seen in series 1962: The War in the Hills as Major Suraj Singh, a character inspired from Major Shaitan Singh, in the Disney Channel original film Spin, hailed as Disney's first film centered around an Indian-American family, wherein he played the role of Arvind Kumar, the father of the protagonist Rhea Kumar, and in the crime comedy film Velle.

== In the media ==
Deol has been described by the Indian media as an actor who continuously understands how to play complex characters. He appeared on several magazine covers including the Man's World and the Time Out Mumbai, with titles such as "The New Face of Indian Cinema". In 2009, Deol was included in the list of Zoom's "50 Most Desirable Hotties", being placed seventh. Deol learned the Israeli martial art Krav Maga. He has expressed feminist views on social media and has also been vocal about minority and migrant rights in India.

In 2014, ahead of the release of his maiden production venture, One by Two, he criticised the company T-Series, at the red carpet of the 20th Screen Awards, for assaulting him, as he refused to get the musical trio Shankar–Ehsaan–Loy to sign an "illegal clause", concerned with the copyright of the film's music.

== Filmography ==
=== Films ===
Key
†	Denotes films that have not yet been released

Year	Title	Role	Notes	Ref
2005	Socha Na Tha	Viren Oberoi		
2006	Ahista Ahista	Ankush Ramdev		
2007	Honeymoon Travels Pvt. Ltd.	Aspi		
2007	Ek Chalis Ki Last Local	Nilesh Rastogi		
2007	Manorama Six Feet Under	Satyaveer Singh Randhawa		
2008	Oye Lucky! Lucky Oye!	Lovinder 'Lucky' Singh		
2009	Dev.D	Dev		
2010	Road, Movie	Vishnu		
2010	Tera Kya Hoga Johnny	Himself	Special appearance in song "Shaher Ki Rani"	
2010	Aisha	Arjun Burman		
2011	Zindagi Na Milegi Dobara	Kabir Dewan	Also playback singer for the song "Señorita"	
2012	Shanghai	T. A. Krishnan		
2012	Chakravyuh	Kabir		
2013	Raanjhanaa	Akram Zaidi / Jasjeet Singh Shergil		
2013	The Lovers	Udaji	English film	
2014	One By Two	Amit Sharma	Also producer	
2016	Happy Bhag Jayegi	Bilal Ahmed		
2018	Nanu Ki Jaanu	Nanu		
2018	Zero	Aditya Kapoor		
2019	Chopsticks	Artist		
2019	Hero	Mahadev	Tamil film	
2019	Line of Descent	Officer Raghav		
2020	What Are The Odds	Valmik	Also producer	
2021	Velle	Rishi Singh		
2022	Jungle Cry	Rudra		

=== Television ===
Year	Title	Role	Notes	Ref
2013	Connected Hum Tum	Host		
2014	Gumrah: End of Innocence	Host		
2020	JL50	Shantanu		
2021	1962: The War in the Hills	Major Suraj Singh		
2021	Spin	Arvind Kumar	Television film	
2023	Trial By Fire	Shekhar Krishnamoorthy		

== Awards and nominations ==
Year	Award	Category	Work	Result	Ref.
2006	Bollywood Movie Awards	Best Male Debut	Socha Na Tha	Nominated	
2006	Zee Cine Awards	Best Male Debut	Socha Na Tha	Nominated	
2007	Indo-American Arts Council Awards	Best Actor	Manorama Six Feet Under	Won	
2010	Screen Awards	Best Actor – Popular Choice	Dev.D	Nominated	
2010	Stardust Awards	Best Actor	Dev.D	Nominated	
2010	BIG Star Entertainment Awards	New Talent of the Decade – Male	—N/a	Nominated	
2012	Filmfare Awards	Best Supporting Actor	Zindagi Na Milegi Dobara	Nominated	
2012	IIFA Awards	Best Supporting Actor	Zindagi Na Milegi Dobara	Nominated	
2012	Screen Awards	Best Ensemble Cast	Zindagi Na Milegi Dobara	Nominated	
2012	4th Mirchi Music Awards	Upcoming Male Vocalist of The Year (for "Senorita")	Zindagi Na Milegi Dobara	Nominated	
2014	Producers Guild Film Awards	Best Actor in a Supporting Role	Raanjhanaa	Nominated	
2023	Filmfare OTT Awards	Best Actor in a Drama Series	Trial By Fire	Nominated	
