= Mudassar Aziz =

Indian filmmaker (born 1980)

- Born: 5 September 1980 (age 45); Mumbai, Maharashtra, India
- Occupations: Film director; screenwriter; producer; songwriter
- Years active: 2005—present

Mudassar Aziz is an Indian film director, screenwriter, producer and songwriter.

== Filmography ==
Year	Title	Director	Writer	Producer	Ref.
2006	Zindaggi Rocks		Yes		
2006	Dil Diya Hai		Yes		
2007	Showbiz		Yes		
2010	Dulha Mil Gaya	Yes	Yes		
2016	Happy Bhag Jayegi	Yes	Yes		
2017	Jia Aur Jia		Yes	Yes	
2018	Happy Phirr Bhag Jayegi	Yes	Yes		
2019	Pati Patni Aur Woh	Yes	Yes		
2022	Double XL		Yes	Yes	
2024	Khel Khel Mein	Yes	Yes		
2025	Mere Husband Ki Biwi	Yes	Yes		
2025	Single Salma		Yes		
2026	Pati Patni Aur Woh Do	Yes	Yes		
TBA	Untitled Mudassar Aziz’s next	Yes	Yes		
