= List of films released by Eros International =

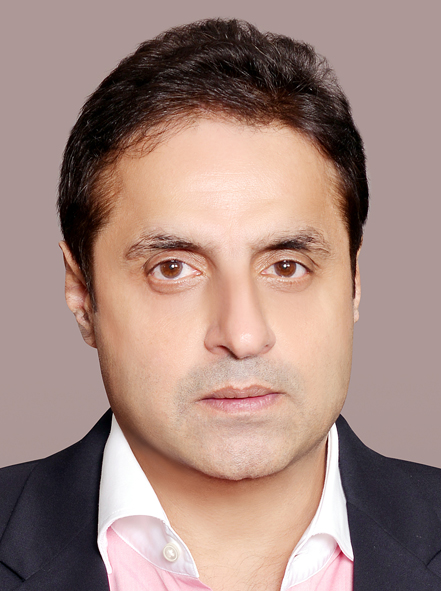
Sunil Lulla, the son of Arjan Lulla, has produced 34 films for Eros International.

Eros International is an Indian entertainment company, established by Arjan Lulla in 1977, that distributes and produces motion pictures. It is headquartered in Mumbai. Being one of leading film production and distribution companies in India, it co-produces or acquires Indian language films and distributes them internationally by its parent Eros International plc.

== Overview ==
Eros International focuses on international markets and has aggregated rights to over 3,000 films in its library, including recent and classic titles that span different genres, budgets and languages. Eros' portfolio of films over the last three completed fiscal years comprised 197 films. In fiscal 2016, the company released 63 films in total either in India, overseas or both. These comprised 33 Hindi films, 19 Tamil films and 11 regional-language films. Eros International win over 60 Awards at 2015 Film Awards. For its most popular releases including Bajirao Mastani, Bajrangi Bhaijaan, Badlapur and Bela Seshe, Eros International collected 18 awards at the Zee Cine Awards held in Mumbai, India on 21 February 2016.

The highest-grossing movie of Eros International is Bajrangi Bhaijaan, released on 17 July 2015, it grossed 970.05 Crore worldwide. The film also grossed ₹179 crore (US$19 million) overseas for a worldwide gross of ₹603 crore (US$63 million) in 31 days. Bajrangi Bhaijaan became the quickest film to collect ₹100 crore (US$10 million) and ₹200 crore (US$21 million) net. The distributor share of the film had crossed ₹150 crore (US$16 million) crore which is a record in India being the second film to do so after PK. In August 2015, Eros International said in a statement to the Bombay Stock Exchange that Bajrangi Bhaijaan has become fastest Bollywood film to gross ₹500 crore (US$52 million) worldwide, while it crossed ₹300 crore (US$31 million) nett at the domestic box office.

== Indian films produced or distributed ==
This is the list of films those have been produced (Note: Most of the films are co-produced with many companies such as Nadiadwala Grandson Entertainment, Shree Ashtavinayak Cine Vision, Dharma Productions, Excel Entertainment, Next Gen Films Colour Yellow Productions etc. The notes section in the table denotes production and distribution details) or distributed (Note: Overseas distribution are done by its parent Eros International plc and the Eros International plc's other divisions. Here all Films that is distributed by its parent overseas are also listed. Check the Notes section in the table) (domestic) or both done by Eros International.

=== Hindi ===
Key
†	Denotes films that have not yet been released

Release date	Title	Notes	Refs
1978	Ghar	Production and theatrical distribution	
1980	Shaan	Production and theatrical distribution	
1981	Lawaaris	Co-production with Prakash Mehra Productions and theatrical distribution	
1992	Khiladi	Distribution only	
1992	Yalgaar	Non-theatrical Distribution (DVD, Blu-ray)	
1993	Divya Shakti	Non-theatrical Distribution (DVD, Blu-ray)	
1993	Khalnayak	Theatrical Distribution	
1993	Izzat Ki Roti	Non-theatrical Distribution (DVD, Blu-ray)	
1994	Anjaam	Theatrical Distribution	
1994	Main Khiladi Tu Anari	Non-theatrical Distribution (DVD, Blu-ray)	
1995	Saajan Ki Baahon Mein	Theatrical Distribution	
1995	Ram Shastra	Theatrical Distribution	
1996	Dushmani: A Violent Love Story	Theatrical Distribution	
1996	Dil Tera Deewana	Theatrical Distribution	
1997	Yes Boss	Non-theatrical Distribution (DVD)	
1997	Aur Pyaar Ho Gaya	Non-theatrical Distribution (DVD)	
1998	Bandhan	Non-theatrical Distribution (DVD)	
1999	Sirf Tum	Overseas distribution (United States and Canada)	
1999	Dil Kya Kare	Theatrical Distribution	
1999	Hum Dil De Chuke Sanam	Theatrical Distribution	
2000	Chal Mere Bhai	Overseas non-theatrical Distribution (DVD) (UK)	
2000	Josh	Distribution only	
2000	Farz	Distribution only	
2003	Ek Aur Ek Gyarah	Distribution only	
2003	Baghban	Distribution only	
2004	Khakee	Distribution only	
2004	Main Hoon Na	Distribution only	
2004	Asambhav	Distribution only	
2005	Kisna: The Warrior Poet	Distribution only	
2005	Shabd	Distribution only	
2005	Bewafaa	Distribution only	
2005	Chocolate	Distribution only	
2005	Lucky: No Time for Love	Distribution only	
2005	Waqt: The Race Against Time	Distribution only	
2005	Jo Bole So Nihaal	Distribution only	
2005	Parineeta	Distribution only	
2005	Paheli	Distribution only	
2005	No Entry	Distribution only	
2005	Dil Jo Bhi Kahey...	Distribution only	
2005	Shaadi No. 1	Distribution only	
2005	Ek Khiladi Ek Haseena	Distribution only	
2005	Ek Ajnabee	Distribution only	
2005	Home Delivery	Distribution only	
2006	Pyare Mohan	Distribution only	
2006	Golmaal: Fun Unlimited	Distribution only	
2006	Omkara	Distribution only	
2006	Shaadi Karke Phas Gaya Yaar	Distribution only	
2006	Lage Raho Munnabhai	Distribution only	
2006	Pyaar Ke Side Effects	Distribution only	
2006	Zindaggi Rocks	Distribution only	
2006	Don	Distribution only	
2007	Salaam-e-Ishq: A Tribute to Love	Distribution only	
2007	Eklavya: The Royal Guard	Distribution only	
2007	Nishabd	Distribution only	
2007	Namastey London	Distribution only	
2007	Cheeni Kum	Distribution only	
2007	Partner	Production and distribution	
2007	Gandhi, My Father	Co-production with Anil Kapoor Films Company and distribution	
2007	Buddha Mar Gaya	Co-production and distribution	
2007	Heyy Babyy	Co-production with Nadiadwala Grandson Entertainment and distribution	
2007	Nanhe Jaisalmer	Production and distribution	
2007	Bhool Bhulaiyaa	Distribution only	
2007	No Smoking	Co-production with Big Screen Entertainment and distribution	
2007	Om Shanti Om	Co-production with Red Chillies Entertainment and distribution	
2007	Dus Kahaniyaan	Distribution only	
2008	Sunday	Production and distribution	
2008	Black & White	Distribution only	
2008	One Two Three	Co-production with Big Screen Entertainment and distribution	
2008	U Me Aur Hum	Distribution only	
2008	Bhootnath	Distribution only	
2008	Sarkar Raj	Distribution only	
2008	Haal-E-Dil	Co-production with Big Screen Entertainment and distribution	
2008	Mehbooba	Production and distribution	
2008	Money Hai Toh Honey Hai	Co-production with Big Screen Entertainment and distribution	
2008	God Tussi Great Ho	Distribution only	
2008	Hijack	Production and distribution	
2008	Drona	Co-production and distribution	
2008	Yuvvraaj	Distribution only	
2008	Heroes	Distribution only	
2008	Ek Vivaah... Aisa Bhi	Distribution only	
2009	Aa Dekhen Zara	Co-production with Next Gen Films and distribution	
2009	Kambakkht Ishq	Co-production with Nadiadwala Grandson Entertainment and distribution	
2009	Love Aaj Kal	Distribution only	
2009	Vaada Raha	Production and distribution	
2009	Wanted	Distribution only	
2009	Aladin	Production and distribution	
2009	London Dreams	Distribution only	
2009	De Dana Dan	Co-distributed with Venus Films and Baba Arts Limited	
2009	3 Idiots	Co-production and distribution only	
2010	Veer	Production and distribution	
2010	Karthik Calling Karthik	Distribution only	
2010	Paathshaala	Co-production with Paperdoll Entertainment	
2010	Housefull	Co-production with Nadiadwala Grandson Entertainment and distribution	
2010	Milenge Milenge	Production and distribution	
2010	Khatta Meetha	Distribution only	
2010	Aisha	Distribution only	
2010	Dabangg	Distribution only	
2010	Anjaana Anjaani	Distribution only	
2010	Aakrosh	Distribution only	
2010	Golmaal 3	Distribution only	
2010	No Problem	Co-production with Anil Kapoor Films and distribution	
2010	Toonpur Ka Superhero	Co-production with Big Screen Entertainment and Panorama Studios and distribution	
2011	Yamla Pagla Deewana	Distribution only	
2011	Game	Co-production with Excel Entertainment and distribution	
2011	Chalo Dilli	Co-production with Big Daddy Productions and distribution	
2011	Love U...Mr. Kalakaar!	Distribution only	
2011	Ready	Distribution only	
2011	Always Kabhi Kabhi	Distribution only	
2011	Zindagi Na Milegi Dobara	Distribution only	
2011	Bol	Distribution only	
2011	Mausam	Co-production and distribution	
2011	Rascals	Distribution only	
2011	Ra.One	Co-production with Red Chillies Entertainment and distribution (Dubai, London, Toronto and worldwide)	
2011	Rockstar	Distribution only	
2011	Desi Boyz	Co-production with Next Gen Films and distribution	
2012	Agneepath	Distribution only	
2012	Agent Vinod	Distribution only	
2012	Housefull 2	Co-production with Nadiadwala Grandson Entertainment and distribution only	
2012	Vicky Donor	Co-production with Rising Sun Films, JA Entertainment and distribution	
2012	Ferrari Ki Sawaari	Distribution only	
2012	Teri Meri Kahaani	Co-production with Kunal Kohli Productions and distribution	
2012	Cocktail	Distribution only	
2012	Kyaa Super Kool Hain Hum	Distribution only	
2012	Shirin Farhad Ki Toh Nikal Padi	Co-production with Bhansali Productions and distribution	
2012	English Vinglish	Co-production with Hope Productions and distribution	
2012	Bhoot Returns	Co-production with Alumbra Entertainment and distribution	
2012	Student of the Year	Distribution only	
2012	Chakravyuh	Co-production with Prakash Jha Productions	
2012	Son Of Sardaar	Distribution only	
2012	Khiladi 786	Co-production with Hari Om Entertainment Co. and HR Musik Limited and distribution	
2012	Dabangg 2	Distribution only	
2013	Table No.21	Co-production with Next Gen Films and distribution	
2013	Main Krishna Hoon	Distribution only	
2013	The Attacks of 26/11	Distribution only	
2013	3G	Co-production with Next Gen Films and distribution	
2013	Go Goa Gone	Co-production with Illuminati Films and distribution	
2013	Yeh Jawaani Hai Deewani	Distribution only	
2013	Raanjhanaa	Co-production with Colour Yellow Productions and distribution	
2013	Bajatey Raho	Production and distribution	
2013	Grand Masti	Distribution only	
2013	Warning	Distribution only	
2013	Goliyon Ki Raasleela: Ram-Leela	Co-production with Bhansali Productions and distribution	
2013	Singh Saab The Great	Distribution only	
2013	R... Rajkumar	Co-production with Next Gen Films and distribution	
2014	Jai Ho	Co-production with Sohail Khan Productions and distribution	
2014	Dishkiyaaoon	Co-production and distribution	
2014	Dekh Tamasha Dekh	Production and distribution	
2014	Purani Jeans	Production and distribution	
2014	Lekar Hum Deewana Dil	Co-production with Illuminati Films and Maddock Films and distribution	
2014	Happy Ending	Co-production with Illuminati Films and distribution	
2014	Action Jackson	Co-production with Baba Films and distribution	
2015	Tevar	Co-production with Sanjay Kapoor Entertainment Pvt.Ltd. and distribution	
2015	Shamitabh	Co-production with Hope Productions and distribution	
2015	Badlapur	Co-production with Maddock Films and distribution	
2015	NH10	Co-production with Phantom Films and Clean Slate Films and distribution	
2015	Tanu Weds Manu Returns	Co-production with Colour Yellow Productions and distribution	
2015	Dil Dhadakne Do	Distribution only	
2015	Bajrangi Bhaijaan	Distribution only	
2015	Bangistan	Distribution only	
2015	Welcome Back	Distribution only	
2015	Hero	Distribution only	
2015	Bajirao Mastani	Co-production with Bhansali Productions and distribution	
2016	Sanam Teri Kasam	Co-production and Distribution only	
2016	Aligarh	Co-production with Karma pictures and distribution	
2016	Ki & Ka	Co-production with Hope Productions and distribution	
2016	Phobia	Co-production with Next Gen Films and distribution	
2016	Housefull 3	Distribution only	
2016	Dishoom	Co-production with Nadiadwala Grandson Entertainment and distribution	
2016	Happy Bhag Jayegi	Co-production with Colour Yellow Productions and distribution	
2016	Baar Baar Dekho	Distribution only	
2016	Banjo	Production and distribution	
2016	Rock On 2	Distribution only	
2016	Kahaani 2: Durga Rani Singh	Distribution only	
2017	Raees	Distribution only	
2017	Munna Michael	Co-production with Next Gen Films and distribution	
2017	Sarkar 3	Distribution only	
2017	Sniff	Distribution only	
2017	Shubh Mangal Saavdhan	Co-production with Colour Yellow Productions and YNOT Studios and distribution	
2017	Newton	Distribution only	
2017	Rukh	Distribution only	
2017	Kadvi Hawa	Distribution only	
2018	Mukkabaaz	Distribution only	
2018	Meri Nimmo	Distribution only	
2018	Bhavesh Joshi Superhero	Distribution only	
2018	Happy Phirr Bhag Jayegi	Co-production with Colour Yellow Productions and distribution	
2018	Manmarziyaan	Co-production with Colour Yellow Productions and Phantom Films and distribution	
2018	Batti Gul Meter Chalu	Distribution only	
2018	Andhadhun	Overseas distribution only	
2018	Tumbbad	Distribution only	
2019	Gone Kesh	Distribution only	
2019	Laal Kaptaan	Production and distribution	
2019	Roam Rome Mein	Production and distribution	
2021	Haseen Dilruba	Production and distribution	

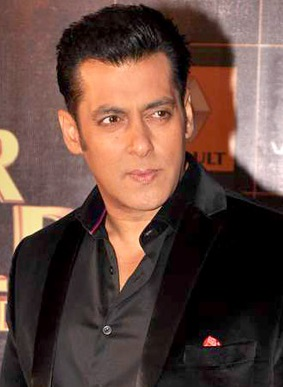
Salman Khan acted in 25 films until 1988 including some of the most popular ones such as Hero, Dabangg 2, Bajrangi Bhaijaan etc.

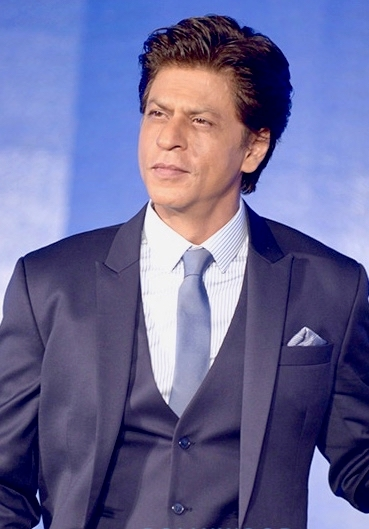
Shah Rukh Khan has acted in 15 films released by Eros including some of the most popular ones such as Don, Heyy Babyy, B Ra.One etc.

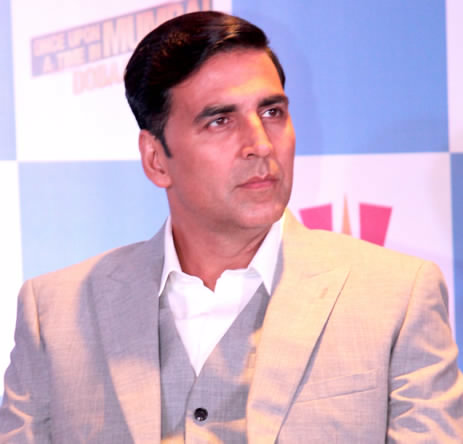
Akshay Kumar, who has his acted numerous times in most of the films presented or produced by Eros International

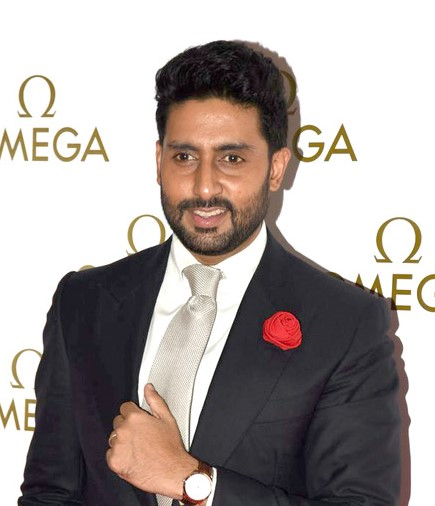
Abhishek Bachchan has acted in 6 films presented by Eros International, such as Drona, Game, Housefull 3 etc.

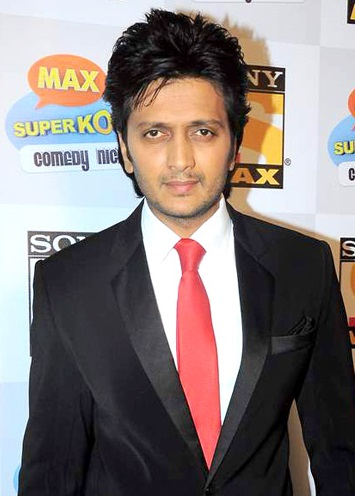
Riteish Deshmukh acted in 9 films including grossing ones such as Aladin, Housefull 3, Housefull 2, Kyaa Super Kool Hain Hum, Grand Masti etc.

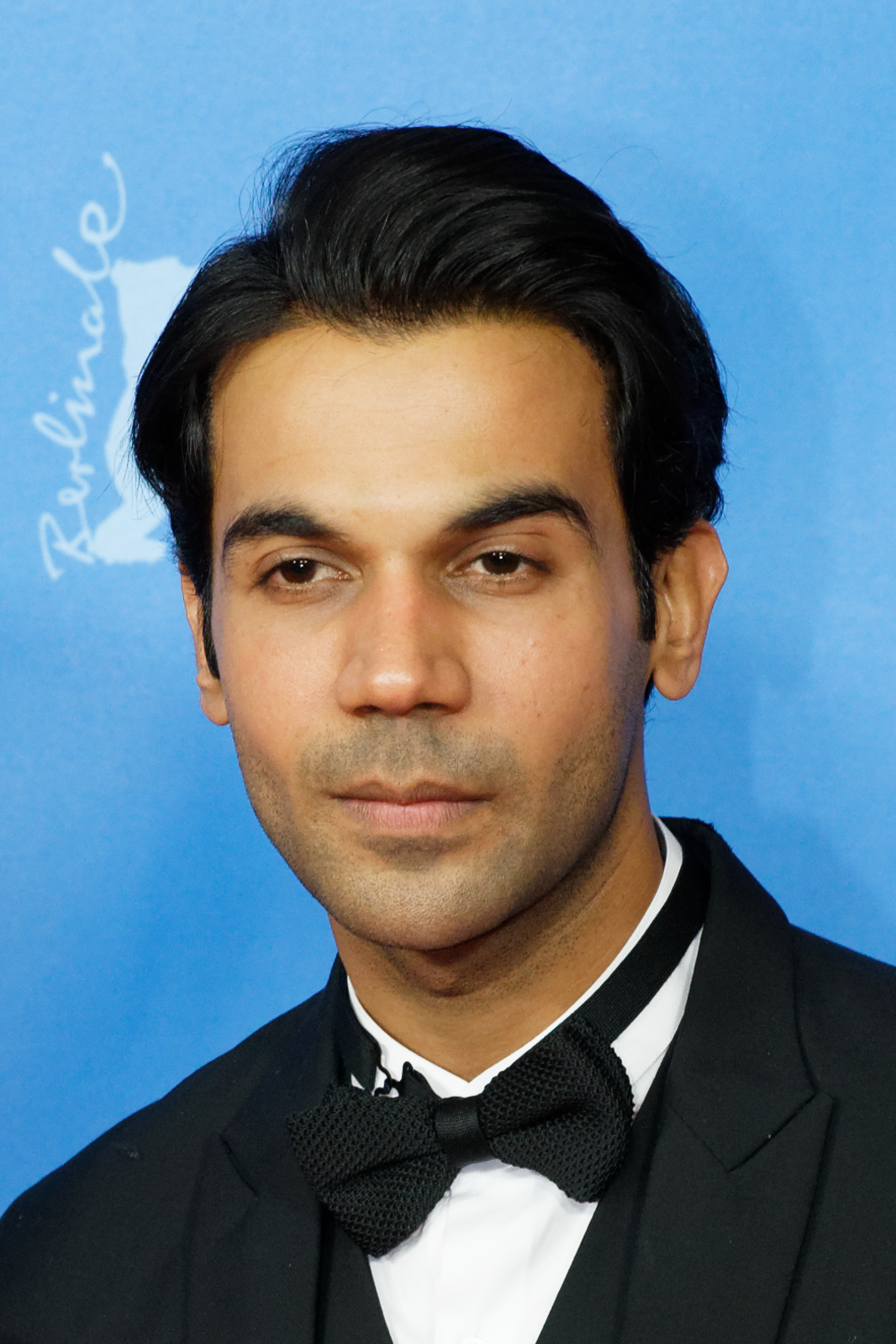
Rajkummar Rao at the World Premiere of Newton, one of Eros's grossing films, that has been selected as India's official submission for the Best Foreign Language Film category at the US Academy Awards for 2018

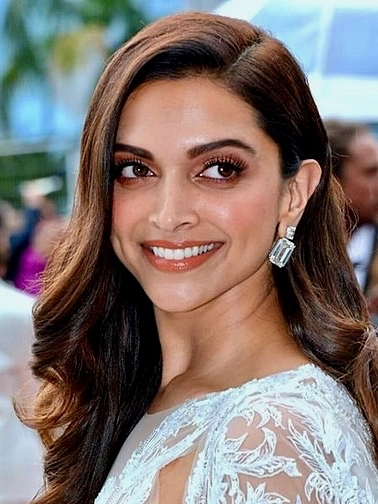
Deepika Padukone acted in 9 films by Eros International including hits such as Bajirao Mastani, Housefull, Cocktail etc.

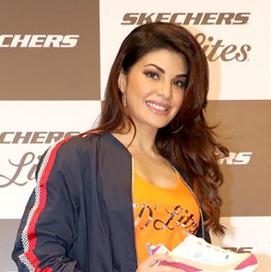
Jacqueline Fernandez, who has acted about 10 times in Eros's films including some of the most popular ones such as Housefull, Aladin, Housefull 2, Housefull 3 etc.

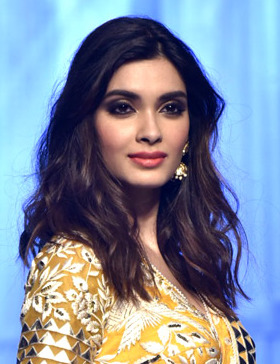
Diana Penty has made her acting debut in Cocktail and also collaborated on 4 films with Eros.

=== Tamil ===
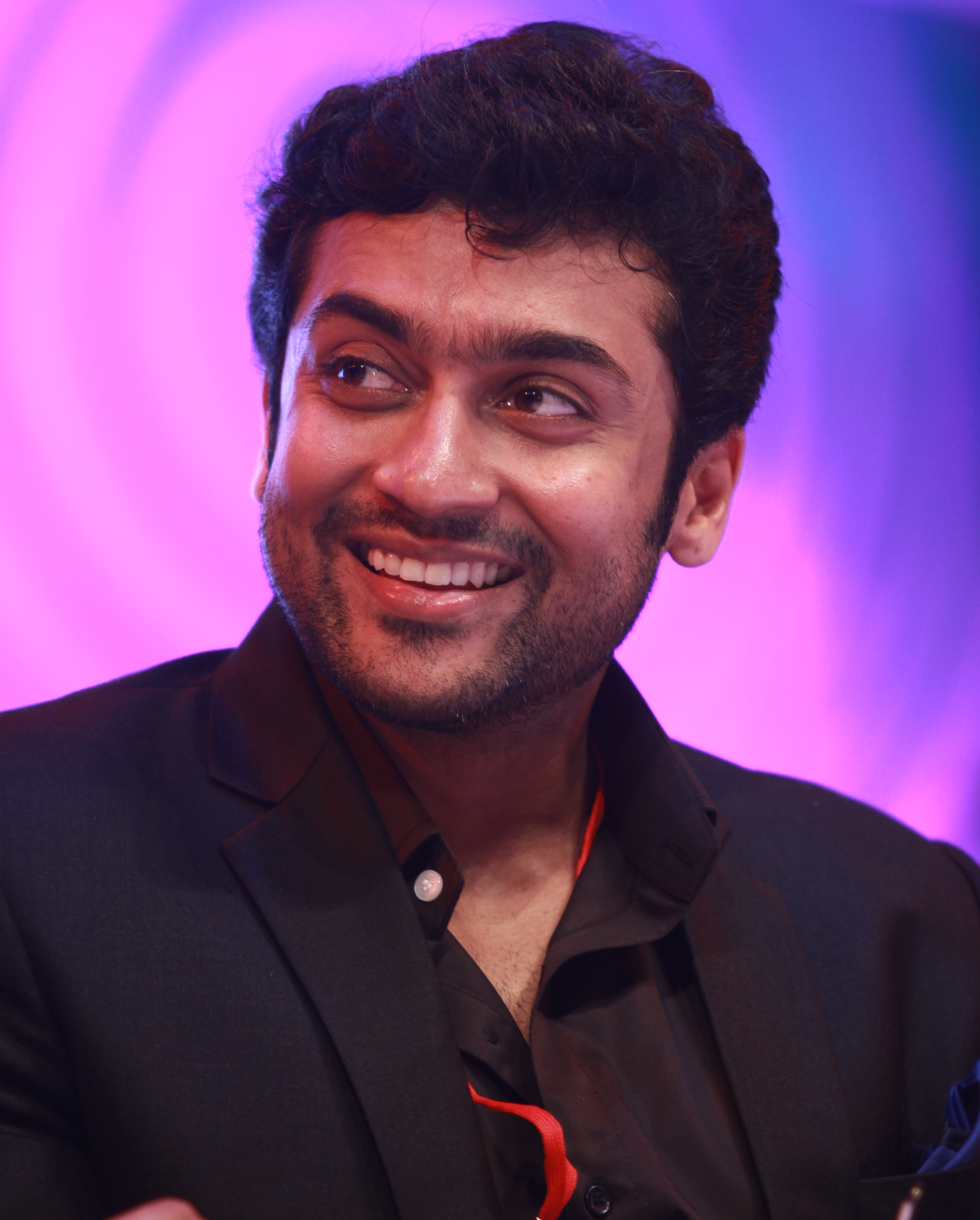
Suriya Sivakumar has acted in three films released by the studio

Release date	Film name	Notes	Reference
12 October 2012	Maattrraan	Distribution only	
18 October 2013	Nugam	Distribution only	
23 May 2014	Kochadaiiyaan	Co-production with Media One Global Entertainment and distribution	
22 October 2014	Kaththi	Distribution only	
12 December 2014	Lingaa	Distribution only	
5 February 2015	Yennai Arindhaal	Distribution only	
2 May 2015	Uttama Villain	Overseas distribution only	
29 May 2015	Massu Engira Masilamani		
1 April 2016	Uyire Uyire	Distribution only	
6 May 2016	24	Distribution only	
24 March 2017	Engitta Modhathey	Production and distribution	
2 June 2017	Oru Kidayin Karunai Manu	Production and distribution	

=== Telugu ===
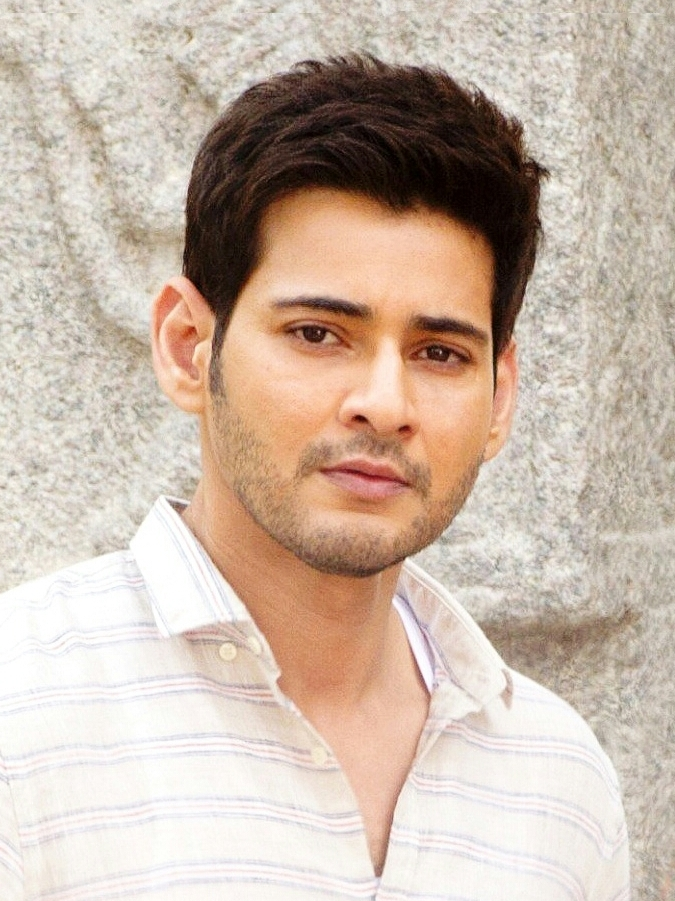
Mahesh Babu has acted in three films released by the studio

Release date	Film name	Notes	Ref(s).
10 January 2014	1: Nenokkadine		
19 September 2014	Aagadu		
7 August 2015	Srimanthudu		
14 January 2016	Dictator		
8 April 2016	Sardaar Gabbar Singh		
1 September 2016	Janatha Garage		
2 November 2018	Savyasachi		
16 November 2018	Amar Akbar Anthony		

=== Malayalam ===
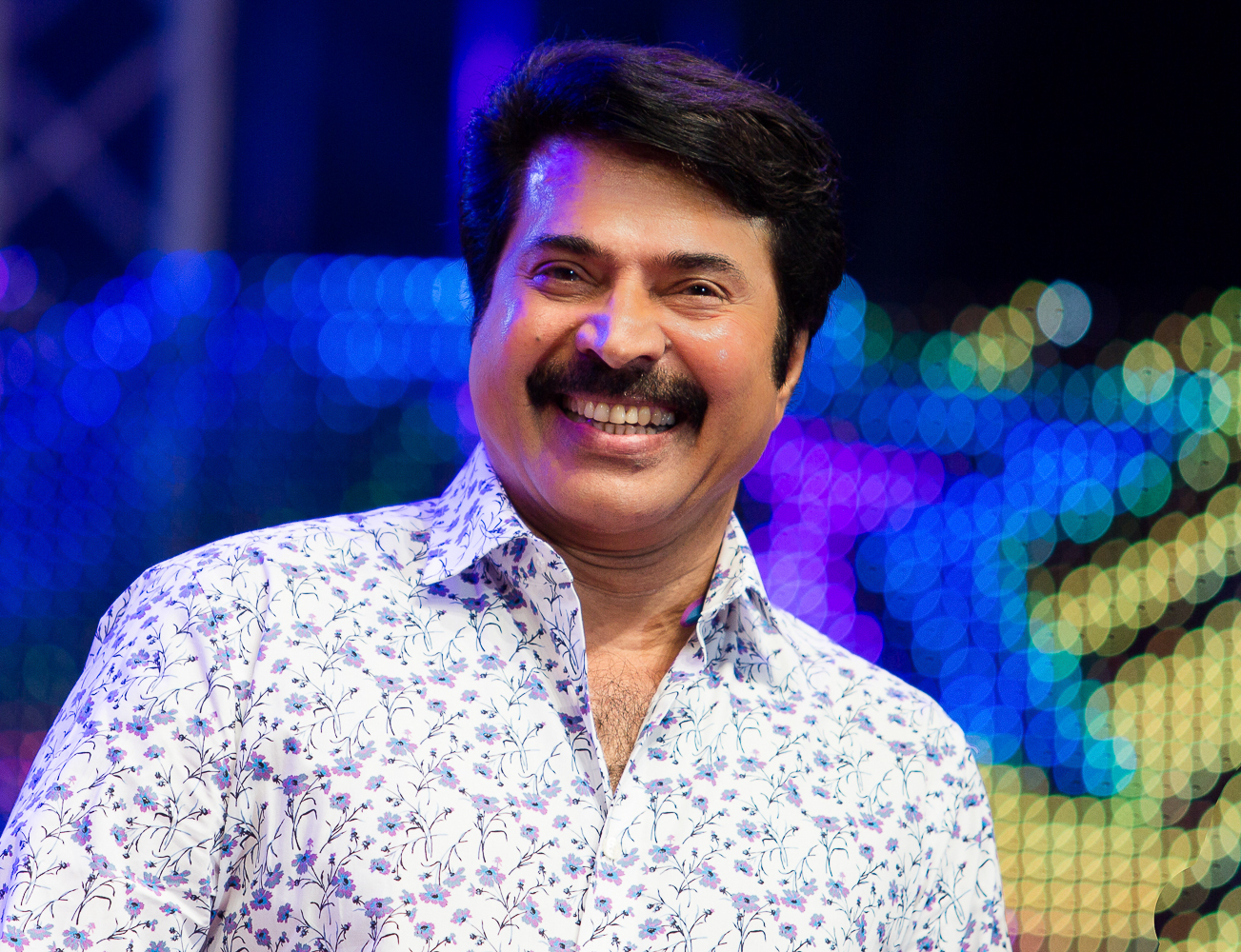
Mammootty has acted in two films released by the studio

Release date	Film name	Reference
24 September 2015	Life of Josutty	
9 October 2015	Pathemari	
20 May 2016	Happy Wedding	
12 August 2016	Inspector Dawood Ibrahim	
29 July 2016	White	
30 September 2016	Olappeeppi	
17 March 2017	C/O Saira Banu	
27 October 2017	Vishwa Vikhyatharaya Payyanmar	
23 November 2018	Ottakoru Kaamukan	

=== Kannada ===
Release date	Film name	Notes	Ref(s).
30 June 2017	Aake	Distribution	

=== Bengali ===
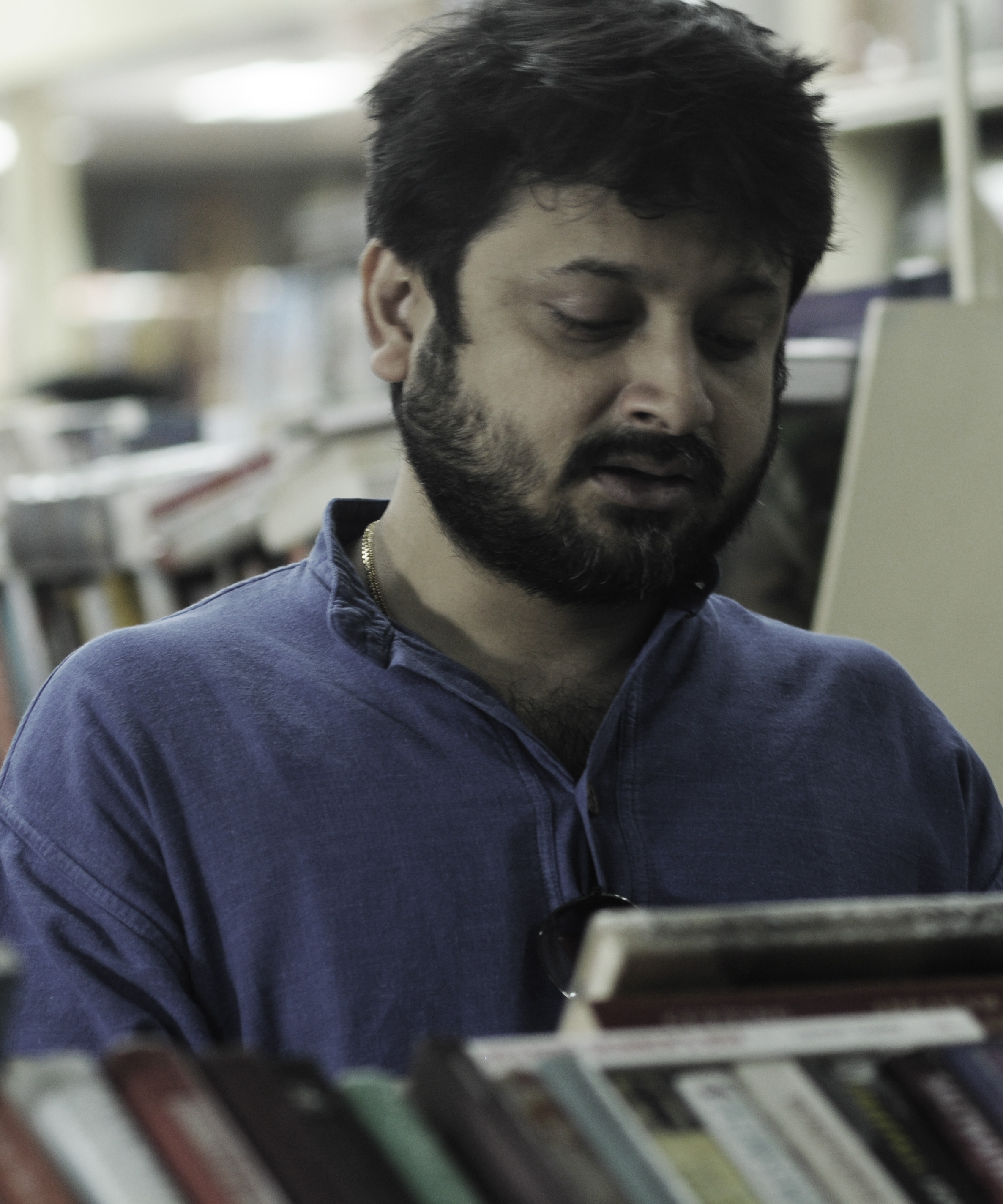
Shiboprosad Mukherjee, an Indian Bengali film producer, has worked with Eros International on most of his films

Release date	Film name	Notes	Reference
1 May 2015	Bela Seshe	Distribution only, first Bengali distribution	
1 January 2016	Monchora	First Bengali co-production, distribution also	
27 May 2016	Praktan	Distribution only	
29 July 2016	Sesh Sangbad	Distribution only	
9 September 2016	Kiriti O Kalo Bhromor	Distribution only	
9 December 2016	Amar Prem	Distribution only	
16 December 2016	Double Feluda	Co-production and distribution	
20 January 2017	Bibaho Diaries	Distribution only	
12 May 2017	Posto	Co-production and distribution	
22 September 2017	Projapoti Biskut	Distribution only	
20 April 2018	Alinagarer Golokdhadha	Distribution only	
11 May 2018	Haami	Distribution only	

=== Punjabi ===
Release date	Film name	Reference
10 April 2009	Tera Mera Ki Rishta	
11 January 2013	Saadi Love Story	
17 April 2015	Mere Haaniya	
22 October 2015	Shareek	
27 November 2015	Mukhtiar Chadha	
11 November 2016	Chaar Sahibzaade: Rise of Banda Singh Bahadur	

=== Marathi ===
Release date	Film name	Reference
22 May 2015	Aga Bai Arechyaa 2	
12 November 2015	Mumbai-Pune-Mumbai 2	
22 January 2016	Guru	
11 March 2016	Phuntroo	
24 June 2016	Ganvesh	
22 July 2016	& Jara Hatke	
12 August 2016	YZ	
5 October 2018	Boyz 2	

=== Assamese ===
Release date	Film name	Reference
5 October 2018	The Underworld	

== International films produced or distributed ==
Release date	Name	Producing country	Language	Notes	Ref(s)
February 14 2008	The Spiderwick Chronicles	America	America		
19 September 2014	Dr. Cabbie	Canada	Canadian	Distribution only	
29 April 2016	Xuanzang	China	Chinese	Co-production with China Film Corporation and Indian distribution	
5 June 2019	Wrong No.2	Pakistan	Urdu	Overseas distribution only (outside Pakistan)	

== Films distributed only ==
- Aakhir Kyon? (Hindi; Released on 30 August 1985)
- Janbaaz (Hindi; Released on 20 June 1986)
- Mere Sajana Saath Nibhana (Hindi; Released on 7 February 1992)
- Hum Tumhare Hain Sanam (Hindi; Released on 24 May 2002)
- Devdas (Hindi; Released on 12 July 2002)

== Highest-grossing films ==
This is a ranking of the highest grossing Indian films produced or distributed by Eros International.

Rank	Name	Release date	Gross	Genre	Ref(s)
1	Bajrangi Bhaijaan	17 July 2015	₹970.05 crore	Drama film	
2	Bajirao Mastani	18 December 2015	₹356.2 crore	Epic romance film	

== See also ==
- List of film production companies in India
