= List of Eros Now original programming =

Eros Now is a subscription based over the top, video on-demand Indian entertainment and media platform, launched in 2012 by Eros International plc. The network offers media streaming and video-on-demand services.

== Movies ==
Name	Release date	Genre	Language	Notes	Ref(s)
Meri Nimmo	27 April 2018	Drama film	Hindi	It is India's first direct-to-digital film. The movie premiered in 47th International Film Festival of India and the Mumbai Film Festival in 2017.	
Ottamuri Velicham	2018	Drama	Malayalam		
Toffee (Short film)	January 2018	Drama	Hindi	Eros Now's first short film, Tahira Kashyap's directorial debut, the film is nominated for the Best Film at the Filmfare Short Film Awards 2018	

== Web series ==
Name	Release date	Genre	No. of episodes	Original language	Notes	Ref(s)
Modi: Journey of a Common Man	April 2019	Political drama	10	Hindi		
Flip	22 March 2019	Life style	4	Hindi		
Metro Park	3 March 2019	Life and drama	9	Hindi		
Operation Cobra	15 February 2019	Crime, action and thriller	6	Hindi	Gautam Gulati's digital debut	
Enaaya	22 January 2019	Romance	12 episodes	Urdu	Eros Now's first Pakistani web series	
Smoke	26 October 2018	Comedy	11 episodes	Hindi	Smoke is the only Indian web series to be showcased at the coveted annual event MIPCOM 2018 at Cannes in France under Made in India Originals category.	
Side Hero	24 September 2018	Comedy	8 episodes	Hindi	Eros Now's first original web series	
Salute Siachen	12 January 2017	Life-action web-series	5 episodes	Hindi		

=== Upcoming ===
Name	Release date	Genre	Language	Ref(s)
Flesh	21 August 2020		Hindi	
Mrityulok	March 2019			
Bhumi	April 2019			
Crisis	April 2019			
Sanyasi Raja	June 2019			
Ponnyin Selvin	March 2019			
Dashavatar	2019			
Kurukshetra	2019			

== Eros Now Quickie ==
- Date Gone Wrong
- Paise Fek Tamasha Dekh
- The Investigation
- Tumse Na Ho Payega

== Other programs ==
=== Animated series ===
Title	Release	Genre	Episodes	Language	Ref(s)
Blazing Bajirao	2015	Action	5 episodes	Hindi	
Mystical Mastani	2015	Action and epic-drama		Hindi	

=== Genre-based series ===
Name	Year	Genre	Episodes	Language	Ref
Kitchen Politics	2014	Food and lifestyle	14 episodes	Hindi	
Quickies with Shipra		Food and lifestyle	29 episodes	Hindi	
Behind the Stumps with RCB		Sports		Hindi	
Twisted Tales	2014	Horror	3 episodes	Hindi	
What They Say, What they Mean		Comedy and romance	4 episodes	Hindi	

=== Others ===
- Eros Now Vibes
- Bollywood Vines
- Eros Now E-buzz
- Eros Now Black and White (Original Interview Series)
- Eros Now Lists
- Feel Good
- Eros Now Bollywood
