= Eros Now Quickie =

Eros Now Quickie is a short-form video content, exclusively made for the OTT platform Eros Now. The original program from Eros Now offers short stories and short web-series. Every episode is 6–10 minutes each and a quickie show is 8–10 episodes each. Eros Now is slated to launch 50 quickies in 2020. The quickies have different genres such as fiction, to non-fiction, comedy, travel, docudramas, slice-of-life etc.

== List of Quickies ==
Title	Cast	Director	Episodes	Genre	Notes	Ref(s)
Date Gone Wrong		Sharad Das Gupta	10	Romance and comedy	The quickie presents some funny and different incidents and facts during anyone's first date.	
Paise Fek Tamasha Dekh	Rahul Purohit	Nishant Sapkale	10	Prank show		
The Investigation	Hiten Tejwani, Aryamann Seth, Prakash Ramchandani, Leena Jumani	Nitesh Singh	9	Crime thriller	Hiten Tejwani's debut show in digital media	
Tumse Na Ho Payega	Akash Deep Arora, Juhi Bhat, Mathur Marufal, Trisha Kale, Paromita Dey	Karl Katgara	10	Romance	Juhi Bhatt's debut show in digital media	

== See also ==
- Eros Now
- Eros International
- List of original programs distributed by Eros Now
- List of films released by Eros International
