= STX Entertainment =

American media company

STX Financing, LLC
- Trade name: STX Entertainment
- Type: Private
- Industry: Entertainment
- Founded: March 10, 2014; 12 years ago
- Founder: Robert Simonds; Bill McGlashan
- Headquarters: Burbank, California, United States
- Key people: Angus Sutherland (CEO)
- Services: Film production; television production; digital media; film development; virtual reality
- Owner: Crown Productions (A-CAP)
- Divisions: STX Films; STX Television; STX Alternative; STX International
- Website: stxentertainment.com

STX Financing, LLC (d.b.a. STX Entertainment, a.k.a. STX) is an American independent entertainment and media company. Founded in March 2014 by film producer Robert Simonds and TPG Growth managing partner Bill McGlashan, the studio produces film, television, and digital media projects.

In April 2020, STX announced that it would merge with the Indian studio Eros International. The merger was completed in July 2020, and STX became a division of ErosSTX. In December 2021, Jahm Najafi announced his intention to acquire STX from the merged company for $173 million – a sale completed in April 2022. Eros remains a minority, non-voting shareholder. In January 2026, STX was revived following a sale to Crown Productions, owned by insurance company A-CAP.

== History ==
In 2012, Simonds and McGlashan began conceptualizing a media company based on the idea of producing medium-budget star-driven projects, a method that had fallen out of favor with Hollywood studios. The conversation led to the launch of STX Entertainment in 2014 (the "S" standing for Simonds, the company's founder; the "T" standing for TPG Growth, whose managing partner McGlashan helped launch the company; and the "X" standing for "secret project"), with the mission to finance, develop, produce, market, and distribute star-driven content around the world. Investors in the company included Hony Capital, Tencent, PCCW, TPG Growth, RTL Group, and Liberty Global. Individual investors included Gigi Pritzker, Beau Wrigley, and Dominic Ng.

In September 2017, it was reported that STX was considering an initial public offering (IPO) on the Hong Kong Stock Exchange (SEHK). It was reported that a listing on the SEHK could bring STX closer to Chinese investors and audiences. The Wall Street Journal stated that the company could be valued at $3.5 billion, after raising an additional $500 million following the IPO. In April 2018, the company filed for an IPO on the Hong Kong Stock Exchange.

STX called off its IPO in October 2018, citing the China–U.S. trade war, and conditions having deteriorated in Hong Kong due to turbulence in the mainland Chinese equity market. An overall co-funding agreement with the Chinese company Huayi Brothers Media lapsed at the end of 2018, and, in April 2019, co-founder Bill McGlashan was fired due to his being indicted in the college admissions bribery scandal.

In April 2020, STX announced that it would merge with the Indian film and television studio Eros International plc. Simonds stated that the merger would create "the first independent media company with the expertise and creative cultures of Hollywood and Bollywood, while also leveraging the important inroads both companies have made into the Chinese market." The combined company would be publicly traded, inheriting Eros' listing on the New York Stock Exchange. The merger was closed on July 30, 2020; the combined company unveiled a new logo and branding as ErosSTX in September. The combined entity raised $125 million of new equity funding and, led by JPMorgan, received $350 million in credit.

In December 2021, amid financial shortcomings following the merger, Jahm Najafi's Najafi Companies announced that it had reached an agreement to acquire STX Entertainment from ErosSTX for $173 million. However, in late January 2022, Lionsgate also emerged as a potential suitor, looking to absorb either part or all of STX; but that deal was later rejected, leaving only Najafi as a potential suitor. In April 2022, Najafi Companies completed its acquisition of STX Entertainment. Eros Media World would retain a 15% non-voting stake in the company. In July 2022, shortly after STX's motion picture chairman Adam Fogelson left the studio, Deadline reported that STX was in talks with Lionsgate over a potential film distribution deal. Shortly after, it was reported that STX Entertainment's U.K. offices, including the London office housing STXinternational's headquarters, were gradually shutting down. Following the departure of STXinternational head John Friedberg to join Black Bear Pictures's international division, it was announced that the latter company was nearing a deal with STX to handle part of its slate internationally. In November 2022, It was reported that STX's distribution and marketing operations would be shuttered and that Operation Fortune: Ruse de Guerre would go to a streaming service domestically, alternatives being considered for The Marsh King's Daughter, Lionsgate possibly taking over distribution for Ferrari, and with Greenland 2: Migration being packaged to other distributors. By February 2023, it was reported that Lionsgate had already taken domestic rights from Operation Fortune: Ruse de Guerre with plans to release it theatrically on March 3, 2023. In July 2023, Neon bought the distribution rights for Ferrari, with Neon releasing it on December 25, 2023.

In January 2026, Najafi sold STX Entertainment to Crown Productions, a subsidiary of insurance platform A-CAP, with Peter Coleman installed as its new CEO and Simonds and Fogelson leaving the company. STX will resume domestic distribution operations, with a target of producing films with budgets of up to $20 million. In November 2026, Coleman was replaced with Angus Sutherland.

== STX Films ==
=== Distribution ===
At launch, the film division of STX focused its efforts on creating a new model. Rather than pursuing the traditional distribution process, the company secured direct distribution agreements with North American theater chains AMC, Regal, Cinemark, Goodrich, Marcus Theatres, and Carmike Cinemas. In early 2015, the company signed a multiyear television output agreement to release films exclusively to Showtime Networks and its channels Showtime, The Movie Channel, and Flix during the premium television window. The deal covered STX Films' theatrical releases through 2019. In April 2015, the company entered into a multiyear partnership with Universal Studios Home Entertainment for Universal to handle marketing, sales, and distribution services for Blu-ray, DVD, and VOD platforms for STX Films theatrical titles in North America. Film distribution was transferred to Studio Distribution Services, LLC, a joint venture between Universal Pictures Home Entertainment and Warner Bros. Home Entertainment. That same month, STX Films closed a three-year slate deal with Huayi Brothers, one of China's largest film studios, enabling the companies to co-produce and co-distribute 12 to 15 films annually. In January 2017, STX Films signed a marketing and distribution agreement with Luc Besson's EuropaCorp Films USA to release their upcoming slate of films in the US after their previous distributor Relativity EuropaCorp Distribution hit financial trouble. In February 2018, STX Films announced it would distribute Netflix and Martin Scorsese's mob drama The Irishman in China along with Media Asia Entertainment Group.

In May 2018, it was reported that STX would distribute and oversee production of Tencent Pictures' and Free Association's film adaptation of the digital comic book Zombie Brother, to be directed by David Sandberg. In July 2018, STX Films acquired domestic distribution rights to the civil rights drama The Best of Enemies, which was released on April 5, 2019.

In August 2023, STX formed a domestic distribution partnership with Lionsgate to handle distribution of its upcoming slate of films and its current film library, starting with The Marsh King's Daughter.

In January 2026, STX re-emerged with plans to begin domestic distribution once more, planning two or three movies in 2026, and six to eight movies in 2027.

=== Film projects ===
In 2015, STX Films acquired its first feature at the Toronto International Film Festival, purchasing the worldwide rights to the sci-fi, action adventure Hardcore Henry for US$10 million. In line with its mission to make medium-budget, star-driven content, STX Films projects have included The Gift (2015), Secret in Their Eyes (2015), Bad Moms (2016), The Edge of Seventeen (2016), The Boy (2016), Free State of Jones (2016), Molly's Game (2017), The Foreigner (2017), I Feel Pretty (2018), Second Act (2018), and Hustlers (2019).

In 2017, STX Films announced its expansion into animation and family content by partnering with the Uglydoll brand. The UglyDolls film was produced by Robert Rodriguez, director of the Spy Kids film franchise. It performed poorly at the box office and received negative reviews from critics. In January 2019, it was reported that STX is planning an animated UglyDolls television series with Hulu.

In January 2018, STX Films and Tencent Pictures announced a co-development deal with Jason Statham targeting the Chinese film market. Statham starred in Furious 7 and The Fate of the Furious, China's two highest-grossing imported films ever. In February 2018, STX Films signed a deal with Alibaba Pictures to co-develop and co-produce the action-sci-fi film Steel Soldiers, produced by Robert Zemeckis. Under the deal, STX Films will handle US and international distribution with Alibaba Pictures retaining rights in Greater China.

In January 2019, STX Films had their first number one box office opening with The Upside, which earned $19.59 million in its opening weekend, and went on to earn over $100 million at the domestic box office. STX earned praise for its efficient marketing of the film, and for lowering The Upside's rating from an R to PG-13, to widen its audience. That month, it was reported that Hart is partnering with STX Films to produce and star in two comedies: a body switch comedy called Black Friday, and an untitled international romantic comedy.

Hustlers had its world premiere at the 2019 Toronto International Film Festival, and was theatrically released in the US on September 13, 2019. It grossed $105 million in the US and Canada, and $157.6 million worldwide. The Gentlemen was released theatrically in January 2020. It grossed $115.2 million at the box office worldwide. As of July 2020, upcoming STX films include Greenland, Run Rabbit Run, The Godmother, Night Wolf, and Muscle.

In January 2026, STX announced the beginnings of a new slate. Upcoming projects include Katie Holmes's Happy Hours trilogy, Mom Prom from producer Toby Emmerich and Nicholas Stoller's & Ike Barinholtz's Crime After Crime; with further projects based on acquired intellectual property: Bad Moms, Hustlers, and Countdown.

=== Awards and recognition ===
In 2016, STX Films became the fastest studio ever to hit $100 million at the domestic box office with the R-rated comedy Bad Moms. The film has earned more than US$180 million worldwide, was the first R-rated comedy since The Hangover to get an A on CinemaScore, and was the most profitable film of the year (by net profit). The film also earned a People's Choice Award for Best Comedy. The 2017 American crime drama Molly's Game was nominated for an Academy Award for Best Adapted Screenplay along with BAFTA, WGA, and Golden Globe nominations. The Edge of Seventeen was nominated for an MTV Movie Award for Movie of the Year, a Directors Guild Award for Outstanding Achievement in a First-Time Feature, and a Golden Globe Award for Hailee Steinfeld. On review aggregator website Rotten Tomatoes, the film has an approval rating of 95%.

Genre films have also received recognition. The psychological horror-thriller The Gift was nominated for a Directors Guild Award for Outstanding Achievement in a First-Time Feature and won a Sitges Film Festival and Fangoria Chainsaw Award. The Space Between Us starring Gary Oldman was nominated for Choice Sci-Fi Movie and Choice Sci-Fi Movie Actor at the 2017 Teen Choice Awards. The horror thriller The Bye Bye Man overperformed industry expectations with a US$13.5 million domestic opening weekend. The Foreigner, a co-production with Jackie Chan's Sparkle Roll Media, crossed $100 million in global box office revenue in October 2017. The film is one of the most successful U.S. and China co-productions, being classified as "a clear winner given that it cost just $35 million" and "a fine example of how a Chinese co-production can work."

In 2019, Hustlers earned Jennifer Lopez the Los Angeles Film Critics Association Award for Best Supporting Actress and award nominations including the Golden Globe Award for Best Supporting Actress, Screen Actors Guild Award for Outstanding Performance by a Female Actor in a Supporting Role, Critics' Choice Movie Award for Best Supporting Actress, and the Independent Spirit Award for Best Supporting Female.

STX Films strives for female diversity in front of, and behind, the camera. More than 20 films have featured women in leading roles or were directed by women.

== STX Television ==
The television division's first project was the 2014 drama-thriller State of Affairs. The 13-episode series was developed by STX TV (as it is stylized) and sold to NBC. In 2015, STX TV produced the NBC pilot Problem Child, based on the 1990 film of the same name.

In April 2016, STX TV expanded into unscripted and reality content, hiring veteran TV producer Jason Goldberg. A few months later, the variety show Number One Surprise launched, which was the first TV series created by a US-based company specifically for broadcast in China. The series premiere in November 2016 on Hunan TV, a Chinese TV station, along with digital platforms Mango TV and PPTV, was viewed nearly 300 million times, and by January 2017 it was the #1 show in China with over 1 billion views.

In May 2017, STX TV announced it had acquired the first TV project from Kevin Kwan, author of Crazy Rich Asians. In August 2018, Amazon Studios gave a script-to-series order for the untitled project, a globe-hopping drama set in Hong Kong, about a powerful family and their business empire. In July 2017, E! greenlit the reality series The Platinum Life, produced by STX TV and Tower 2 Productions. In November 2017, STX TV announced its first scripted show Valley of the Boom, a six-part docudrama series about the 1990s tech boom from showrunner and director Matthew Carnahan and executive producer Arianna Huffington. The show airs on NatGeo, with STX distributing in China. It premiered on January 13, 2019. STX Television produced season 23 of True Life, which aired on MTV in 2017. The company also produced the docuseries A Little Too Farr, following American country singer-songwriter Tyler Farr, which premiered on Verizon's go90 streaming service. In February 2018, Fox and STX TV announced that it is developing an unscripted series based on its film Bad Moms. In April 2018, Mother Media Group, founded by former Endemol Shine and 20th Century Fox executives, signed a first-look deal with STX TV. Under the pact, the companies will collaborate to create, produce, and distribute unscripted and hybrid series.

In 2018, it was reported that Netflix gave a six-episode series order for STX TV's hybrid docudrama miniseries Ottoman Rising, which tells the story of Mehmed the Conqueror; later retitled Rise of Empires: Ottoman, it premiered on Netflix on January 24, 2020. It was also announced that YouTube Red would produce a TV spinoff based on STX's 2016 film The Edge of Seventeen, with an entirely new cast.

== STX Alternative ==
The digital division of STX Entertainment focuses on digital programming, partnerships, and distribution, which includes live events and virtual reality (VR). In August 2016, STX acquired the VR creator and distributor Surreal, renaming it STX Surreal. In its first year (2015), Surreal produced over 70 immersive VR experiences.

In 2017, STX Surreal was nominated for an interactive Daytime Emmy Award for the Nickelodeon short Nickelodeon's Ultimate Halloween Haunted House 360 Challenge and won a Shorty Award for Best Use of 360 Video for their 360° production of the 68th Emmy Awards, in collaboration with the Academy of Television Arts & Sciences and Facebook. In June 2017, STX Surreal announced a partnership with media services agency Horizon Media to develop and produce VR and immersive content for the brand's new UNCVR unit. In 2018, STX Surreal announced a slate of original projects, including New Tricks, directed and produced by Ed Helms; The Kiev Exchange, a spin-off of STX Films' Mile 22; Jay and Silent Bob VR, written, produced, and directed by Kevin Smith; and untitled projects from Dave Bautista and Derek Kolstad.

Robert Rodriguez's live-action short-form VR film The Limit, starring Michelle Rodriguez, was released by STX Surreal on major mobile headsets and on Android phones with cardboard viewers in November 2018. It was also going to be released on iOS, PlayStation VR, and Windows Mixed Reality. The Academy Award-winning visual effects studio DNEG worked on the film in post-production.

In December 2017, Dick Clark Productions sold Chinese distribution rights to the Golden Globe Awards and Dick Clark's New Year's Rockin' Eve to STX Digital. STX partnered with Tencent Video to be its distribution partner for both programs, including the production of a Chinese-language red carpet program for the Chinese feed of the Golden Globes.

In December 2018, it was reported that the renamed division, now called STX Alternative, signed a first-look development and production deal with Tracey Edmonds, to co-produce and co-develop scripted and unscripted content for traditional and alternative platforms. The first project, Games People Play, based on the book Games Divas Play by Angela Burt-Murray, premiered on BET on April 23, 2019.

== STX International ==
In April 2016, a dedicated international division, called STX International, was opened to further expand global production and distribution capabilities. Headquartered in London, the division is led by former Film4 head David Kosse. The division was launched with a slate of six films that included Andy Serkis's directorial debut Breathe (which opened the 2017 London Film Festival), Home Again, and the thriller Wind River. Additional titles on the slate include Ridley Scott's All the Money in the World, Neil Burger's thriller The Marsh King's Daughter, and Bart Layton's heist film American Animals, along with titles from the main STX Films slate. STX bought the international distribution rights to The Irishman for $50 million. Renamed ErosSTX International following the merger of Eros International and STX in 2020, the company reverted to its former name in April 2022 following STX's sale to the Najafi Companies.

In July 2022, it was reported that STX Entertainment's U.K. offices, including the London office housing STXinternational's headquarters, were gradually shutting down.

== Film library ==
=== Television and digital ===
Title	Channel	Year	Comment
State of Affairs	NBC	2014–15	Co-produced with Universal Television, Abishag Productions, and Aardwolf Productions
True Life	MTV	2016	Co-produced the episode True Life: We Are Orlando
Number One Surprise	Hunan TV/Mango TV/PPTV	2016–present	Co-produced with XG Entertainment
A Little Too Farr	go90	2017	Co-produced with Tower 2 Productions
The Platinum Life	E!	2017	Co-produced with Tower 2 Productions
75th Golden Globe Awards Red Carpet Show	Tencent Video	2018	Co-produced with Tencent
Alex Strangelove	Netflix	2018	Originally meant to be distributed by STX, but ended up producing the film.
The Limit	STX Surreal	2018	VR film directed by Robert Rodriguez
Valley of the Boom	National Geographic Channel	2019	Co-produced with Matthew Carnahan Circus Productions
Games People Play	BET	2019–2021	with Edmonds Entertainment
Flip It Like Disick	E!	2019	with Tower 2 Productions, Disick Industries, Jenner Communications and Ryan Seacrest Prods.
Work It	Netflix	2020	Streaming film
FBOY Island	HBO Max/The CW	2021–present	
The Gentlemen	Netflix	2024–present	with Moonage Pictures, Toff Guy Films and Miramax Television
Lovers and Liars	The CW	2024–present	with TheYearOfElan Productions
Jay and Silent Bob VR	STX Surreal	TBA	Co-production with View Askew Productions
Untitled Dave Bautista Series	STX Surreal	TBA	
Untitled Derek Kolstad Project	STX Surreal	TBA	
New Tricks	STX Surreal	TBA	Co-production with Pacific Electric Picture Co.
The Kiev Exchange	STX Surreal	TBA	Co-production with Film 44 and Film 45
Untitled Kevin Kwan and David Sangalli Scripted Series	TBA		
Untitled Bad Moms reality series	Fox	TBA	Co-produced with Fox Alternative Entertainment
