= Phobia (2016 film) =

Indian psychological thriller film

- Directed by: Pavan Kirpalani
- Written by: Pavan Kirpalani; Pooja Ladha Surti; Arun Sukumar
- Screenplay by: Pavan Kirpalani; Pooja Ladha Surti; Arun Sukumar
- Produced by: Viki Rajani
- Starring: See below
- Cinematography: Jaya Krishna Gummadi
- Edited by: Pooja Ladha Surti
- Music by: Daniel George Background score Karan Gaur
- Production companies: Eros International; Next Gen Films
- Distributed by: Pixel Digital Studios
- Release date: 27 May 2016
- Running time: 111 minutes
- Country: India
- Language: Hindi
- Box office: ₹32.5 million (US$340,000)

Phobia is a 2016 Indian psychological thriller film, directed by Pavan Kirpalani and produced by Viki Rajani. The film stars Radhika Apte in the leading role as Mehak, an artist suffering from severe agoraphobia. Produced jointly by Eros International and Next Gen Films, it was released on 27 May 2016.

Development began in 2015, when Rajani signed Radhika Apte for a film to be made under his banner. Rajani worked on the script, with principal photography taking place in Mumbai. The film features music by Daniel B. George. The film features only one song. The lyrics for the song 'Roke na ruke' were written by Jay Shankar Prasad and sung by Sakina Khan and Sidharth Basrur.

Phobia was released on 27 May 2016 to a positive response, with praise centered on Radhika Apte's performance. Apart from her performance, the film's other production elements and picturisation, background score and special effect works were also praised by the critics and audience.

== Plot ==
Mehak Deo (Radhika Apte) is a highly talented artist. An unfortunate traumatic event - being molested by a taxi driver – causes her to develop extreme agoraphobia, a condition in which the individual is paranoid about being in public places and dislikes socializing with large groups of unknown people. Mehak's sister Anusha (Nivedita Bhattacharya), initially supportive, becomes exhausted with her eccentric behavior, especially when it starts impacting her own 5-year-old son.

Shaan (Satyadeep Mishra), a close friend, takes Mehak to an empty apartment, on the assumption that living alone for a while might benefit her. At the new apartment, Mehak befriends Nikki (Yashaswini Dayama), a college-going girl who lives in the neighbourhood. Her other neighbour Manu (Ankur Vikal) is working on anger management issues and is part of a community laughter club.

Manu is devastated because his girlfriend, Jiah Khurana (Amrita Bagchi), has left him. Jiah had earlier lived in Mehak's new apartment and suddenly disappeared without a trace; without paying rent and without claiming her advance deposit back leaving behind most of her belongings. Mehak comes across Jiah's diary chronicling her tempestuous and abusive relationship with Manu due to his temper issues. Mehak concludes from the diary that Manu killed Jiah, convinced by Jiah's sudden departure, Manu's seemingly questionable behaviour and a series of vivid visions she has of what seems to be Jiah's death like a severed finger in her freezer, a red knife on her bathroom floor (identical to one she saw in Manu's hands earlier), a male intruder in her bedroom and a wounded woman in her bathtub. This prompts her to call Jiah's parents to convey her suspicions, though Shaan is skeptical.

Jiah suddenly arrives and confronts them regarding Mehak's call to Jiah's parents. Jiah then reconciles with a reformed Manu, confirming that Mehak was mistaken leaving Mehak questioning her very reality.

When Shaan confesses that he has always loved her and tries to kiss her, she spurns him and berates him furiously, accusing him of exploiting her weakened state of mind. During the resulting confrontation between them, since the exact sequence of events occurs just like her visions, Mehak realizes that they were premonitions of her future. She then concludes that she's the one who's going to be killed by Shaan (who she realises is the intruder and that she is the wounded woman with her finger severed). In a paranoid delusional panic she attacks him with a knife. Shaan's attempts to calm her result in her finger getting severed accidentally. Shaan calls for an ambulance after preserving her severed finger in the freezer.

She locks up Shaan in her bedroom and exits her building in a daze, finally having overcome her fear. In the climactic scene, her vision once again coincides with reality, as we see a painting she created earlier, showing hands reaching out to her, mirroring the situation in which she is injured and goes out in the open for help, overcoming her condition.

== Cast ==
- Radhika Apte as Mehak Deo, a young, gifted artist suffering from agoraphobia.
- Satyadeep Mishra as Shaan, Mehak's friend
- Ankur Vikal as Mannu Malhotra
- Yashaswini Dayama as Nikki
- Nivedita Bhattacharya as Anusha Deo, Mehak's sister.
- Amrita Bagchi as Jiah, Mannu's girlfriend who suddenly disappears.
- Faezeh Jalali as Psychiatrist
- Salone Mehta as Gul aunty
- Arush Nand as Joey
- Dinyar Tirandaz as Hormos
- Amit Kumar Pandey as cab-driver
- Malhar Goenka as debt collector

== Production ==
=== Development and casting ===
The film was directed by Pawan Kirpalani, and the screenplay was written by Pawan Kirpalani and Arun Sukumar. The film was made under the collaboration with Eros International and Next Gen Films.

Pre-production work on Phobia began in the last quarter of 2015 when Viki Rajani announced his plans of making a new project with debutant Pawan Kripalani. Following the success of her previous films Manjhi - The Mountain Man and Ahalya Apte was contracted by Rajani to play the main character in the film. On casting Apte, Rajani commented, “Radhika has proved her acting prowess time and again with her previous films. I am sure she will be able to deliver another enthralling performance in this genre, which is also a first for me. Pawan has earlier directed this genre expertly and audiences can look forward to a taut edgy thriller."

After casting Apte in the film, Apte said in a statement that, "I absolutely love thrillers and horrors, so I'm very happy to be doing my first film in this genre. I am particularly excited about my collaboration with Eros, Next Gen and Pawan Kriplani on our project together."

=== Filming ===
Before the principal photography of the film began, Apte reportedly met doctors and patients to do research for her role in the film. She was in close contact with psychiatrists and neurosurgeons in order to understand the mental and biological aspect of a phobia. She met patients and observed them to understand their behavioural patterns. Radhika said in a statement: "I'm in touch with doctors and they have shared valuable information with me about the subject. It has helped me get a deeper understanding of panic attacks."

Principal photography commenced in October 2015 in Mumbai. Within three months of one schedule, it ended in the second half of January 2016.

Apte said that she had prepared to get to the core of the character for the film. She had much material to both read and watch. In an interview with Mid-Day, she spoke that her parents helped her prepare for the film. She revealed that she had turned to her surgeon parents for better understanding of the particular phobia.

Before a couple of days of the release of the film, Apte shared her filming experience and said, "This is my first solo film. I was fine with the whole concept. But physically it was traumatic at times to shoot in the same closed location for long hours. The toughest part was to film the panic attack sequences. It takes a lot from your body as you have to breathe in a certain manner."

The director, Kripalani said that he was frightened before showing the film to the censor board, but they loved it and didn't suggest any cuts in the film. In a statement, he said, “I was really worried about how the censors will react because it is thematically an adult film. When they saw the movie, they called me in and said that they can’t cut one single thing from the movie."

Siddhaye Patel was the continuity supervisor

=== Marketing ===
The marketing campaign was carried out by the lead actress Apte for the promotion of the film. She was seen in two shows on the small screen. The first is Girls on Top, where she revealed her biggest phobia. She was seen performing a song called "Darr" as a special guest. Radhika said, "It is extremely important for one to face their fears and live a bold life. As an actor we have to face many demons day after day and none of us want to fall in that pitfall but instead we want to fight them and continue rising."

The second show that she was seen was in Crime Patrol. She hosted a few episodes of the show. Commenting on her anchoring experience, Radhika said, “I am quite excited as I will be hosting a show for the first time. I am extremely grateful to Anoop as he doled out handy tips on anchoring. It was considerate of him to remain present throughout the shoot to oversee how the episode was coming along. The sequence is related to my film Phobia and it will surely leave a good message for the audience.”

== Soundtrack and reception ==
Phobia

Soundtrack album
- Released: 18 May 2016
- Recorded: 2016
- Length: 2:14
- Label: Eros Now

The music rights of Phobia were sold to Eros Now. The soundtrack, which released on 18 May 2016, featured music composed by Daniel B George with lyrics penned by Jay Shankar Prasad. At the event, the lead actress Apte, director Kripalani and producer Rajani were present. It was a 360 degree video. The song was shot on a VR headset, and is one-of-its kind done in the history of cinema.

Track listing
No.	Title	Lyrics	Singer(s)	Length
1.	"Roke Na Ruke"	Jay Shankar Prasad	Sakina Khan, Siddharth Basrur	2:14
Total length:				2:14

The song got good response from the audiences. A critic of Zee ETC Bollywood said, "The song gets good response from the audience and now its become most trending song."

== Release ==
The film had a special screening on 25 May 2016 attended by Apte and her friends in the industry including Kalki Koechlin, Prateik Babbar, Sayani Gupta and Rajkumar Rao among others. The film got a positive response from many Bollywood celebrities. They expressed their response of the film via their Twitter handles. Kalki Koechlin applauded Apte and said that she is one of the brilliant actress and the film is one kickass psychological thriller. She recommended to watch the film. Popular celebrities, Varun Dhawan, Arjun Kapoor and many other Bollywood celebrities showered praise on Apte's performance and on the film.

The film released worldwide on 27 May 2016.

== Critical reception ==
=== India ===
Upon release, Phobia received positive response from film critics in India. Sweta Kaushal of The Hindustan Times gave 4 out of 5 stars and concluded saying, "Despite the element of horror, director Pawan Kriplani manages to keep the supernatural, religious drama at bay and opts for a psychological mayhem that makes for an impressive viewing experience." The film was also very well appreciated by Taran Adarsh of Bollywood Hungama. Via Twitter, he tweeted, "Expect the unexpected... #Phobia is a spine-chilling, nerve-racking, well-crafted psychological thriller. Radhika Apte is simply outstanding."

Mohar Basu of The Times of India gave 3.5 out of 5 stars and said that, in Phobia there are minor glitches in the thrilling fare. He adds, that in the end, Phobia is an unnerving movie that plays skillfully on the fear of the unknown. Suhani Singh of India Today in her 3.5-star review, explained that Phobia doesn't just scare the audience but also outsmart them. In addition, she says that just when they think that they have solved the mystery, director and co-writer Pawan Kripalani knocks the audience from their seats.

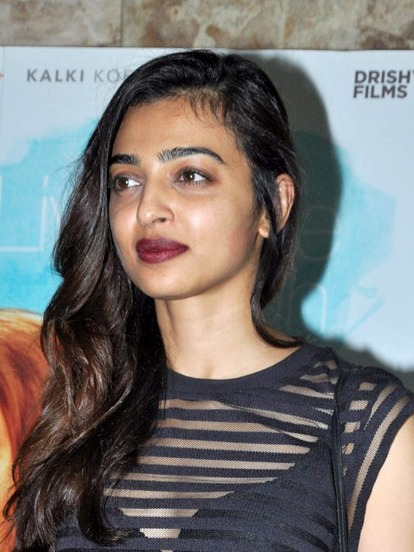
Apte's performance was particularly praised by the critics.

A reviewer of Bollywood Hungama gave 3 stars out of 5, saying, "an intriguing screenplay that keeps you riveted through the course of the film and the ending surprises you to no end". Saibal Chatterjee of NDTV also gave 3 out of 5 stars and said that Phobia is a canny flick that places known genre conventions in fresh light, the kind that bestows new life on them. Shubhra Gupta of The Indian Express called the film a "genuine frightener", saying that the film pulls it off with pizazz, helped by a crackerjack plot and performances.

A review carried by the Financial Express mentioned,

Director Pawan Kripalani does an excellent job with the script and manages to deliver a fairly unique experience. The first half is taut and gripping but the script does sag into the second half and resolves with a climax that might be too abstract for mainstream taste. But paired with an excellent actress like Radhika Apte, together these two manage to win the hearts of the audiences.

Apte's performance in the film was singled out by many critics as noteworthy. A reviewer in Bollywood Hungama calling her performance "worthy of a National Film Award", stated: "Apte is so effortless and so much in control of the extremely difficult character that as a viewer you'd find it stunning." While Singh said, "The makers couldn't have asked for a better actress, as Apte was terrifyingly good in this psychological horror". Chatterjee deemed her "riveting" and said, "Phobia wouldn't be half the film it is without the mercurial Radhika Apte. Watching her on the screen as emotions flash across her visage is an unalloyed delight."

The background score and major technical aspects of the film including; the cinematography, the editing, the locations and the costumes, was also well appreciated by the critics. A critic from Box Office India praised the film's music and said, "Music by Daniel George is good and background score by Karan Gaur brilliantly captures the essence of the film, making the narration even more fascinating to watch." Also lauding the editing, which he called "Sharp", and technical aspects of the film he said, "Cinematography by Jayakrishna Gummadi earns brownie points as his camerawork brings substance to the story."

=== Overseas ===
Overseas, the film received positive reviews. Shilpa Jamkhandikar of Reuters praised the film and said that the director, Kripalani passes the basic horror film test. In addition, she says that he scares the viewers to make them jump out of their seats and intrigues them enough to make them stay till the end.

=== Box office ===
Though the film received mixed to positive reviews from the critics, the film had a disastrous opening at the Box Office India. The film was released in fewer theaters, over 540 theaters across the world. Since it is a solo psychological thriller, so the crew of the film did not invest much on the movie promotions, even though many critics appreciated the directing and performance of Apte.

The film opened to a very dull response in North India and East India as well as in the multiplexes. The film could only register 2-3% collections. On its first day, it earned only about ₹2.5 million (US$26,000) nett, with major collections coming from Mumbai and Delhi NCR. It collected nearly around ₹5 million (US$52,000) nett on Saturday as well as on Sunday, hence totaling its first weekend collection around ₹12.5 million (US$130,000).

From Monday to Thursday, the film collected a total earnings of ₹11 million (US$110,000), taking its lifetime total to around ₹23.4 million (US$240,000) nett.

== Similarities ==
In May 2016, before the release of the film, sources said that there are some similarities between the Ram Gopal Varma directorial Kaun and Kripalani's film Phobia, which raises the question if he has taken the inspiration from the former. Both the films have the same director, shooting the entire film at one location and the central characters suffering from anxiety disorder. On this, the director Kriplani replied, "As an audience it was a fun movie and I really enjoyed but I understand why people compare Phobia with Kaun because both are psychological thriller and both have a girl trapped in the house."

Apte had also dismissed suggestions of any similarities between both the films, pointing out that she does not take any inspiration from characters in other films to prepare for her own role. She replied and said, "Phobia and Kaun have no similarities. Phobia is a very different film with a very different character. And, when I work on any character, I work very independently on it."

== Sequel ==
As a result of the good response coming from the Bollywood celebrities, critics and audiences, the makers are reportedly planning a sequel of the film. The producer Rajani confirmed that Pawan will be directing the sequel again and the script has been already put into development. He also adds that the sequel will be based on the fear of flying which is very common and everyone relates to easily.
