= Tumse Na Ho Payega =

Tumse Na Ho Payega (lit. 'You Can't Do That') may refer to:

- "Tumse Na Ho Payega", a quote from the 2012 Indian film Gangs of Wasseypur by the character Ramadhir Singh (played by Tigmanshu Dhulia)
- Tumse Na Ho Payega (web series), a 2019 Indian web series
- Tumse Na Ho Payega (film), a 2023 Indian Hindi-language comedy drama film

== See also ==
- Guddan Tumse Na Ho Payega, a 2018 Indian television series
