= R... Rajkumar =

2013 Indian film by Prabhu Deva

- Theatrical release poster
- Directed by: Prabhu Deva
- Screenplay by: Sunil Kumar Agrawal; Ravi S. Sundaram
- Dialogues by: Shiraz Ahmed
- Story by: D. Shankaraiyya; Prabhu Deva
- Produced by: Viki Rajani; Sunil Lulla
- Starring: Shahid Kapoor; Sonakshi Sinha; Sonu Sood
- Cinematography: Mohana Krishna
- Edited by: Ballu Saluja
- Music by: Songs: Pritam; Score: Sandeep Chowta
- Production company: Next Gen Films
- Distributed by: Eros International
- Release date: 6 December 2013 (India)
- Running time: 146 minutes
- Country: India
- Language: Hindi
- Box office: ₹101.21 crore

R... Rajkumar is a 2013 Indian Hindi-language romantic action film written and directed by Prabhu Deva and produced by Viki Rajani and Sunil Lulla under Next Gen Films. The film stars Shahid Kapoor, Sonakshi Sinha and Sonu Sood in the lead roles, alongside Ashish Vidyarthi, Asrani, Mukul Dev and Srihari.

R... Rajkumar was released on 6 December 2013 to mixed reviews from critics, but became a commercial success with a worldwide gross of over ₹100 crore (US$10 million) at the box office.

== Plot ==
Romeo Rajkumar is an aimless youth who arrives in Dhartipur, a small town ruled by two drug barons named Shivraj Gurjar and his arch-enemy Manik Parmar, controlled by a mafia boss named Ajit Taaka, who operates in Hong Kong. Rajkumar begins working for Shivraj, but his life changes forever when he sees Chanda. Unknown to him, Chanda is an orphan who is being raised by her uncle Manik Parmar. After some persistent wooing, Chanda falls for Rajkumar. When their love was about to flourish, Shivraj sees Chanda emerging from water during a pooja ritual and lusts after her.

Meanwhile, Shivaraj compromises with Parmar, who decides to get Chanda married to Shivraj against her wish. Enraged, Rajkumar beats Shivraj's men and challenges him that he will marry Chanda in front of Shivraj. Shivraj tries a lot to impress Chanda but keeps failing. One day, Chanda gets angry and challenges Shivraj that she will strip her clothes herself only if Shivraj defeats Rajkumar. Furious, Shivraj plans to get Rajkumar killed in an encounter by his pet cop. but gets a shocking surprise where it is revealed that Rajkumar actually works for Ajit Takka and was sent to Dhartipur only to take over the drug cartel to which Shivraj and Parmar owe allegiance. Rajkumar captures Shivraj's narcotic truck and drives it to Taaka.

After giving Shivraj's stolen truck to Takka, Rajkumar discovers that the truck was empty, where it turns out that Shivraj and Takka had joined hands and purposely made Rajkumar steal the empty truck. Shivraj brutally kills Rajkumar and has his men bury him. Shivraj starts his wedding celebrations with Chanda, only to be interrupted by Rajkumar, who is shown to have been rescued by Shivraj's henchman Qamar Ali after he was buried. A one-on-one fight ensues between the two, where Shivraj overpowers Rajkumar for the majority of the fight, but Rajkumar kills Shivraj with a power punch to the throat and also kills Takka for the betrayal. After this, an injured Rajkumar reunites with Chanda and walks away happily, while Qamar Ali and his men beat Parmar and Shivraj's remaining allies.

== Cast ==
- Shahid Kapoor as Romeo Rajkumar
- Sonakshi Sinha as Chanda
- Sonu Sood as Shivraj Gurjar
- Ashish Vidyarthi as Manik Parmar
- Asrani as Pandit
- Mukul Dev as Qamar Ali
- Srihari as Ajit Taaka
- Ashok Samarth as Inspector
- G. V. Sudhakar Naidu
- Vijay Patkar as Chatur Singh
- Charmy Kaur (Special appearance in song "Gandi Baat")
- Prabhu Deva (Special appearance in song "Gandi Baat")
- Ragini Dwivedi (Special appearance in song "Kaddu Katega")
- Scarlett Mellish Wilson (Special appearance in song "Kaddu Katega")
- Poonam Jhawer as Bindu, a flirty woman who spies on Chanda

== Production ==
Production started in second half of 2013. Sonakshi Sinha performed some action scenes in the film. Charmy Kaur shot for an item song "Gandi Baat" for the film in June 2013. Kannada actress Ragini Dwivedi made her Bollywood entry (only Bollywood film at moment) in the item song "Kaddu Katega" which also featured Scarlett Mellish Wilson and only her Bollywood film at the moment.

The film was first titled Rambo Rajkumar which is also the name of a veteran stunt director from south India. According to reports, the makers of the original Rambo series had copyrighted the word Rambo making it unavailable for usage by other filmmakers. As a result, the makers decided on a title change for the film. However, since the film's title is already known among the audience, the makers decided on dropping a few letters from the title, rechristening it to R... Rajkumar. After the film's title change, Shahid Kapoor's character in the film, which was Rambo Rajkumar initially, was also changed. During its filming, Kapoor narrowly avoided serious burns during a stunt sequence. Song sequence was shot at Great Rann of Kutch.

While filming the movie, Srihari complained of giddiness and was rushed to Lilavati Hospital. Due to a prior liver ailment, he died in the hospital on 9 October 2013.

After the film's release and subsequent success, the Academy of Motion Picture Arts and Sciences, which oversees the famous Academy Awards, sent a formal letter to producer Viki Rajani asking for a copy of the film's script to be kept in the Oscar Library. This is the fifth Bollywood film, after Lagaan, Heroes, Rock On!!, and Guzaarish, to be requested for this honour by the academy. Speaking of the request, Viki Rajani said, "It's a privilege that our movie script has been recognized internationally and it's an honour for us to be a part of the archives at the Academy Library. The movies was loved by the audience and has done well at the box-office. This is another happy moment for the entire team." Director Prabhu Deva, speaking of the request, said, "Making this movies has been a fun experience and this honour tops it all. What more can I ask for."

For the song Gandi Baat, Sonakshi Sinha refused to wear a bikini while emerging from the pool of water out of comfort and respect. Instead, Sinha wore a saree for the sequence of the song.

== Music ==
R... Rajkumar

Soundtrack album by Pritam
- Released: 7 November 2013
- Recorded: 2010–2013
- Genre: Film soundtrack
- Length: 30:45
- Labels: Sony Music India; Eros Music; Bombay Tracks LLP
- Producer: Pritam

Pritam chronology
Phata Poster Nikhla Hero (2013)	R... Rajkumar (2013)	Dhoom 3 (2013)

The soundtrack of the film was composed by Pritam. The first song of the film "Gandi Baat" was released on 16 October, which is sung by Mika Singh and Kalpana Patowary. The other song released was "Saree Ke Fall Sa", sung by Antara Mitra and Nakash Aziz. The entire album, consisting of six tracks composed by Pritam, with lyrics by Anupam Amod and Mayur Puri, was released physically on 7 November 2013. The music recording engineer was Sukumar Dutta.

The music was initially released through the Eros Music label and then re-released in 2023 through Sony Music India.

Track listing
No.	Title	Lyrics	Singer(s)	Length
1.	"Gandi Baat"	Anupam Amod	Mika Singh, Kalpana Patowary	4:13
2.	"Saree Ke Fall Sa" (Touch Karke)	Mayur Puri	Antara Mitra, Nakash Aziz	3:53
3.	"Dhokha Dhadi"	Neelesh Misra	Arijit Singh, Palak Muchhal	4:09
4.	"Mat Maari"	Ashish Pandit	Kunal Ganjawala, Sunidhi Chauhan	4:21
5.	"Kaddu Katega"	Ashish Pandit	Antara Mitra	3:31
6.	"Gandi Baat" (Film Version)	Anupam Amod	Nakash Aziz, Ritu Pathak	4:26
7.	"Saree Ke Fall Sa" (Touch Karke – Remix)	Mayur Puri	Antara Mitra, Nakash Aziz, DJ Angel	3:49
8.	"R... Rajkumar" (Mashup)		DJ Angel	2:23
Total length:				30:45

== Reception ==
=== Critical response ===
The Times of India gave 3/5 stars and wrote "While R… Rajkumar entertains at some levels, it suffers from utter plainness and predictability." Tushar Joshi of DNA India gave 2/5 stars and wrote "Watch it if you are in the mood for a loud no-brainer that relies on formulaic over the top entertainment." Mohar Basu of Koimoi gave 2/5 stars and wrote "R…Rajkumar is a below ordinary, at best Prabhudheva’s most modest work till date."
