= Kishore Lulla =

Indian film producer

- Born: 4 September 1961 (age 65); Bombay, Maharashtra, India
- Education: Government Law College, Mumbai
- Years active: 1977–present
- Organizations: Eros International plc; B4U; Eros Innoavtion www.erosinnovation.com

Kishore Lulla is an Indian businessman who is the founder and chairman of Eros Innovation and the executive director of Eros Media World (formerly Eros International Plc), the first Indian media & entertainment company to be listed on New York Stock Exchange and also the first to be delisted in 2021.

His brother Sunil Lulla is the executive director at Eros International Media Limited, which is listed on the Bombay Stock Exchange and was barred by the Securities and Exchange Board of India in June 2023. He is also chairman of Eros Investments, a holding company for his investments.

== Early life ==
Lulla graduated with a bachelor's degree in arts from Mumbai University. He also attended the School of Business and Law at the Government Law College, Mumbai.

== Career ==
=== Eros International ===
Lulla has held the position of director at Eros Media World Plc (formerly known as Eros International Plc) since 2005. He resigned in 2022 as the Executive Director of Eros International Media Limited since the 28 September 2009, the company listed in BSE as well as NSE stock exchanges. As Executive chairman of the Eros Group Kishore, started working for Eros when he was 16. He teamed with his father and went to UK. He has expanded and popularized Bollywood films in U.K. U.S. and the Middle East and entered newer markets like Latin America, South Korea and America under Lulla Bollywood films.

=== Eros Investments ===
Eros Investments has recently established collaborations with an artificial intelligence firm, Stability.ai. Additionally, they have revealed plans to develop blockchain enterprises in Dubai and have announced a strategic partnership with the Dubai World Trade Centre Authority. Kishore's daughter, Ridhima Lulla, launched a virtual universe called Immerso. Eros Investments also acquired a 90% stake in DRM company, Ent Global, with plans to let creators and fans to interact directly to purchase, sell and trade various digital assets.

=== Contributions to Bollywood ===
He is the founder of Eros Innovation Bollywood For You (B4U), a music and entertainment platform. B4U Movies was the first 24-hour Bollywood digital satellite and pay TV channel on the British BSkyB platform. In 2000, The Economist discussed Lulla's goal of globalizing Bollywood.

=== Other contributions ===
Kishore is a member of the British Academy of Film and Television Arts. He is also a member of the Young presidents' Organization and also a board member of the University of California, Los Angeles Film School.

In 2010, Kishore Lulla and his family set up the Eros Foundation for the education of children and worked to bring equality for women in workplace.

== Recognition ==
=== Awards ===
- Lulla received the Entertainment Visionary Award by the Asia Society of Southern California for promoting Indian cinema.
- Asian Business Awards 2007
- Global Citizenship Award 2014 by the American Jewish Committee

=== Honours ===
- As per The Sunday Times rich list released in 2011, Kishore Lulla was among the richest Indian with a net worth of 240 million pounds and with a family fortune of 206 million pounds.
- In 2015, Kishore Lulla was a part of the Sun Valley Conference.
- Lulla was honoured at the 2018 Economic Times India-UK Strategic Conclave as one of the Game Changers of India.

== Controversies ==
Eros has struggled to shake off accounting fraud allegations for years. In 2012, BDO, the accounting firm, identified a couple of questionable transactions involving Eros and Prime Focus, a company operated by Namit Malhotra.
