= Eros Media World =

Indian mass media corporation

Eros Media World plc
- Formerly: ErosSTX Global Corporation (2020-2022)
- Type: Public
- Traded as: Expert Market: EMWPF
- Industry: Media and entertainment
- Predecessor: STX Entertainment; Eros International plc
- Founded: 2020; 6 years ago
- Headquarters: Mumbai, Maharashtra, India
- Area served: Worldwide
- Key people: Rishika Lulla Singh (executive chairperson); Pradeep Dwivedi (CEO)
- Products: Motion pictures Television; Digital
- Services: Motion picture production and distribution Television production and distribution
- Revenue: ▲US$ 270.1 million (FY 2019)
- Operating income: ▲US$ 63.9 million (FY 2018)
- Net income: ▲US$ 126.5 million (FY 2018)
- Total assets: ▲US$ 1.09 billion (FY 2019)
- Total equity: ▲US$ 661.7 million (FY 2019)
- Number of employees: 340 (2020)
- Divisions: Eros International; Eros Now
- Website: erosmediaworld.com

Eros Media World plc (formerly ErosSTX Global Corporation) is an Indian media company that acquires, produces, and distributes films, television shows, and digital content. The company is led by executive chairperson Rishika Lulla Singh.

== History ==
Eros International plc was founded by Arjan Lulla and Kishore Lulla in 1977 as an Indian film and television production and distribution company. The company launched its ErosNow OTT service in 2012, which by 2020 had 36.2 million paid subscribers, and the largest library of Indian content in the world. Eros International plc became the first Indian media company to list on the Alternative Investment Market (AIM) of the London Stock Exchange. Subsequently, the company delisted from AIM in November 2013 to list on the New York Stock Exchange. Eros merged with STX Entertainment in an all-stock deal in April 2020 to become ErosSTX Global. Sixteen months later, ErosSTX entered into negotiations to sell the STX business.

On 7 December 2021, Jahm Najafi's Najafi Companies announced that it had reached an agreement to acquire STX Entertainment from ErosSTX for US$173 million. Lionsgate also emerged as a potential suitor, but it was rejected on 10 March 2022, leaving Najafi as the only suitor left. The sale was closed in April 2022, effectively splitting STX from ErosSTX and making it an independent studio again.

Shortly after the sale of STX, ErosSTX announced their rebranding to Eros Media World plc, with some changes in management and reduced debt following STX's sale. Eros Media World would, however, retain a 15% stake in STX. Rishika Lulla Singh was named executive chairman, with Pradeep Dwivedi acting as the new CEO and Rajesh Chalke being stated as the new CFO of the company. The company will focus on its content library and film studio Eros International, as well as Eros Now and Eros Music.

Eros did not file its Form 20-F annual report for the fiscal year ending March 31, 2021, as well as its Form 6-K semi-annual report for the period ending September 30, 2021, to the Securities and Exchange Commission (SEC) by the deadline of August 17, 2022. Consequently, Eros shares were delisted by NYSE Regulation, and trading of these shares was suspended. Eros publicly declared in January 2023 that it had chosen not to pursue an appeal against the delisting.

In 2014, Eros launched a £50 million bond in London. It was supposed to be repaid in April 2023, but in March 2023 the company offered to repurchase up to half their bonds at a price of 60p in the pound and delay repayment of the rest of the bonds until 2026. After numerous bondholders agreed to the deal, Eros offered to purchase only £2m of bonds, and delay payment until March 2024. This announcement caused Eros bond prices to drop to 16p.

In June 2023, in India, the Securities and Exchange Board of India (SEBI) barred Eros International Media and CEO Pradeep Kumar Dwivedi from the securities market until further notice for allegedly breaching trade practice regulations. In July 2023, the Bank of India filed a claim against the UK arm of Eros in the London Circuit Commercial Court. As a result, the company put its UK business into insolvency. Meanwhile, ErosNow, the flagship digital property of Eros, began to experience intermittent outages.

== Management ==
Rishika Lulla Singh serves as Eros Media World's executive chairperson and Pradeep Dwivedi as CEO. The CFO, Rajesh Chalke, resigned November 20, 2023, and has not been replaced as of November 9, 2024.

Eros Media World's board of directors is composed of Kishore Lulla, Rishika Singh, Dhirendra Swarup, and Dilip Thakkar.

Divisions name	Country	Founded	Description
Eros Now	India	2012	Indian subscription-based over-the-top, video on demand entertainment and media platform

Subsidiaries name	Country	Founded	Description
Eros International	India	1977	Indian film production and distribution company

== Controversies ==
=== Inappropriate social media content related to Navratri ===
In October 2020, Eros Now and Arre was accused of posting "vulgar" content on social media regarding the holy Hindu festival of Navratri. They deleted the posts after receiving severe criticism.

=== Undisclosed transactions ===
The short seller Hindenburg Research documented multiple undisclosed related-party transactions that appear to be designed to hide receivables and route them to Lulla family members. The SEBI investigation noted that a significant portion of Eros revenue from operations, trade receivables, and loans extended primarily involved transactions with related parties. These figures had witnessed a notable surge during the fiscal year 2019-20. The initial report indicated that, on the surface, these transactions suggested potential financial irregularities or the diversion of funds by the company. SEBI also barred Eros Worldwide and Eros Digital - entities that own a stake in Eros International Media from dealing in the securities market. Additionally, SEBI directed the Bombay Stock Exchange to appoint a forensic auditor to examine the books of three exclusively BSE-listed companies - Thinkink Picturez, Mediaone Global Entertainment, and Spicy Entertainment & Media, who have acted as conduits in the alleged misrepresentation and diversion of funds by Eros.
