= Number One Surprise =

Chinese television series

- Genre: comedy, variety show
- Developed by: Jason Goldberg
- Country of origin: China
- Original language: Mandarin

Production
- Running time: 1 hour
- Production companies: STXtelevision; XG Entertainment

Original release
- Network: Hunan TV; PPTV; Mango TV
- Release: 21 November 2016 – present

Number One Surprise is a Chinese comedy variety show television series developed by Jason Goldberg and produced by STXtelevision and XG Entertainment. It premiered on Hunan TV, Mango TV and PPTV on 21 November 2016. It had almost 300 million viewers on its premiere and, as of January 2017, was the most watched program on Hunan TV. It was cancelled after 4 episodes on TV and went straight to online only broadcast.
