= Next Gen Films =

Indian film production company

- Type: Private
- Industry: Motion picture
- Founded: 2008
- Founder: Viki Rajani
- Headquarters: Mumbai, India
- Key people: Viki Rajani (CEO)
- Products: Film production Film distribution

Next Gen Films is an Indian motion picture production and distribution company based in Mumbai. The company was founded in 2008 by producer Viki Rajani. The company is mostly known for making films like Desi Boyz and Table No.21. Next Gen's most films are co-produced or distributed by Eros International. In 2019, it was renamed as Faith Films.

== Filmography ==
Year	Film	Director	Ref.
2009	Aa Dekhen Zara	Jehangir Surti	
2010	Veer	Anil Sharma	
2011	Desi Boyz	Rohit Dhawan	
2013	Table No.21	Aditya Datt	
2013	3G	Sheershak Anand	
2013	R... Rajkumar	Prabhu Deva	
2016	Phobia	Pawan Kirpalani	
2017	Munna Michael	Sabbir Khan	
