= Cheryl Najafi =

American author, speaker, and businesswoman

- Born: 1967 or 1968 (age 58–59); Webb City, Missouri, US
- Education: Arizona State University
- Occupations: Artist, author, speaker, businesswoman
- Spouse: Jahm Najafi
- Children: 3

Cheryl Najafi (born 1968) is an American artist, author, speaker and businesswoman. She is the former CEO of Everyday Dishes & DIY (previously CherylStyle), a lifestyle media company and author of New York Times best-selling book You're So Invited: Panic Less, Play More, and Get Your Party On!. In 2017, Najafi founded the direct-to-consumer apparel company, LoveOverH8.com, after seeing the effects of the Trump travel ban. She is currently the founding artist and creative director of the Butterfly Art Collective, an artists' studio whose work focuses on creating artworks that inspire meaningful change and action in the world.

== Early life and education ==
Najafi was born in Webb City, Missouri. She earned both a Bachelor's and Master's degree in communication from Arizona State University.

== Career ==
In January 2011, Najafi founded CherylStyle, a multimedia lifestyle company based in Arizona. She was the founding CEO of the company. CherylStyle was later rebranded as Everyday Dishes & DIY.

In 2012, Najafi wrote You're So Invited: Panic Less, Play More, and Get Your Party On which was a New York Times best-selling book in June 2012. The book gives tips on entertaining and etiquette while focusing on using what you have and maintaining that it is not necessary to be perfect. Najafi wrote her second book, Mother Daughter Dishes: Reinventing Loved Classics in 2014.

After the announcement of President Donald Trump's travel ban, Najafi searched online to find clothing that matched her views of inclusivity. She started LoveOverH8.com, a direct-to-consumer apparel company that advocates for social justice causes. Najafi instituted that $10 of each sale goes toward a cause of the customer's choice to raise money for people that have been disenfranchised.

In 2024, Najafi founded the Butterfly Art Collective. The collective creates large resin-cast butterfly sculptures to commemorate and respond to different societal issues. Their first campaign, Resilience, is a collection of 25 large resin butterflies, each one commemorating one of the deadliest mass shootings in the United States.

== Personal life ==
She is married to businessman Jahm Najafi. They have three children. Najafi and her family live in Phoenix, Arizona.

== Bibliography ==
- Cheryl Najafi (May 29, 2012). You're So Invited: Panic Less, Play More, and Get Your Party On. St. Martin's Press. ISBN 9781250011992.
- Cheryl Najafi (May 27, 2014). Mother Daughter Dishes: Reinventing Loved Classics. CreateSpace. ISBN 9781494927417.
