= Eros International plc =

Former mass media company in India

- Trade name: EROS
- Type: Public limited company
- Industry: Media and Entertainment
- Founded: 5 January 1977; 49 years ago
- Founder: Arjan Lulla and Kishore Lulla
- Defunct: 25 April 2020; 6 years ago
- Fate: Merged with STX Entertainment
- Successor: Eros Media World
- Headquarters: First Names House, Victoria Road, Douglas, Isle of Man IM2 4DF, British Isles, Isle of Man
- Area served: Worldwide
- Key people: Kishore Lulla (Executive Chairman and Director); Ridhima Lulla (COO); Prem Parameswaran (Chief Financial Officer); Vijay Ahuja (Executive Director); Mark Carbeck (Chief Corporate Officer); Ali Hussain (CEO-Eros Digital)
- Services: Motion picture production and distribution
- Revenue: ▲US$ 261 million (FY 2018)
- Operating income: ▲US$ 63.9 million (FY 2018)
- Net income: ▲US$ 126.5 million (FY 2018)
- Total assets: ▲US$ 1.41 billion (FY 2018)
- Total equity: ▲US$ 865.6 million (FY 2018)
- Owner: Kishore Lulla
- Number of employees: 423
- Divisions: see Divisions
- Subsidiaries: See Subsidiaries
- Website: erosmediaworld.com

Eros International plc was an Indian, multinational, mass-media conglomerate that mostly worked in the Indian film and entertainment industry. The company co-produced, acquired and distributed Indian-language films through its production-and-distribution subsidiary Eros International, and distributed them worldwide. The group's headquarters were in the Isle of Man and its distribution network existed in over 50 countries. The group had offices in India, the United Kingdom, the United States, the United Arab Emirates, Australia, and Fiji. Kishore Lulla, the son of the founder Arjan Lulla, was the chairman of Eros International plc.

On 16 April 2020, US film studio STX Entertainment announced it would merge with Eros International to form Eros STX; the transaction was expected to close by June that year. The merger was completed in July 2020, forming Eros STX Global Corporation. The merged company experienced difficulties, and STX was demerged and sold to Najafi Companies in April 2022. Shortly after, ErosSTX announced its rebranding to Eros Media World plc.

== Divisions and subsidiaries ==
| Division name | Country | Founded |
|---|---|---|
| Eros International Media Limited | India | 1977 |
| Eros Digital | India | 2012 |
| Eros Australia Pty Ltd | Australia | |
| Eros International Pte. Ltd. | Singapore | |
| Eros International USA Inc. | United States | |
| Eros Music Publishing Limited | United Kingdom (England and Wales) | |
| Eros Network Limited | United Kingdom (England and Wales) | 2000 |
| Eros Pacific Limited | Fiji | |
| Eros World Wide FZ-LLC | United Arab Emirates (Dubai) | 2006 |

== Acquisitions and subsidiaries ==
| Name | Country | Founded or acquired |
|---|---|---|
| B4U Network | United Kingdom | 1999 |
| Acacia Investments Holdings Limited | Isle of Man | |

== Eros International Media ==
Eros International plc's biggest subsidiary was Eros International Media Ltd, which was one of the oldest companies in the Indian film industry to focus on international markets. Eros International Media Ltd owned aggregated rights to over 3,000 films, and had a portfolio of 197 films during its last-three-completed fiscal years. In fiscal 2016, the company released 63 films; these consisted of 33 Hindi films, 19 Tamil films, and 11 regional-language films. For fiscal 2016, the company generated aggregate worldwide revenues of $274.4 million derived from theatrical, television syndication, and digital and ancillary distribution channels.

=== Eros Now ===
Eros Now, the company's digital over-the-top (OTT) platform, controlled rights to over 5,000 films, and focused on Indian films, music and original shows with offline viewing and subtitles. Eros Now adopted a platform agnostic distribution strategy on Android and iOS platforms on mobile devices, cable, and the Internet, including deals with original equipment manufacturers (OEMs).

== Stock market listings ==
Eros International plc was the first Indian media company to be listed on the Alternative Investment Market (AIM) of the London Stock Exchange. The company delisted from the AIM in November 2013 to become listed on the New York Stock Exchange (NYSE:EROS).
