= Jahm Najafi =

Iranian-American businessman (born 1963)

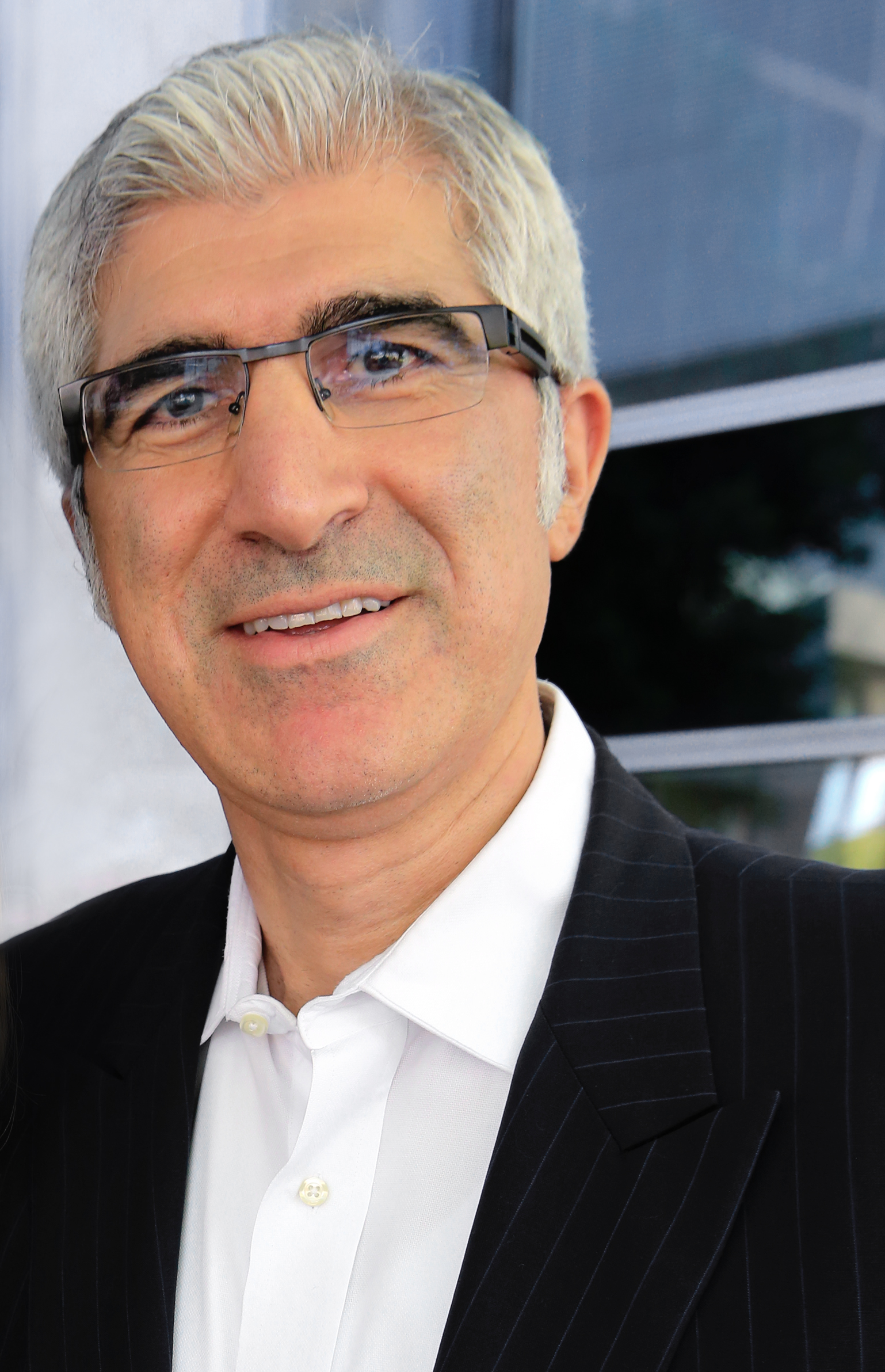
- Born: Jamshid Jahm Najafi; March 1963 (age 63); Imperial State of Iran
- Education: University of California, Berkeley; Harvard University
- Occupation: Investor
- Known for: Vice chairman of the Phoenix Suns
- Spouse: Cheryl Najafi
- Children: 3

Jamshid Jahm Najafi (born March 1963) is an Iranian-American billionaire businessman. He manages The Najafi Companies, a private equity firm, and is vice chairman of the NBA's Phoenix Suns and McLaren Racing.

== Early life and education ==
Najafi was born in Iran. In 1975, he and his older brother Francis relocated to the United States. He received a bachelor's degree in political science and economics from the University of California, Berkeley, followed by a master's degree in business economics from Harvard University in 1986.

== Career ==
Najafi worked for Salomon Brothers, a Wall Street firm that became part of Citigroup, before he was CEO of Pivotal Private Equity and partner and COO of the parent company, The Pivotal Group, which he ran with his brother, Francis Najafi, from 1990 to 2002. Pivotal focused on the purchase of commercial properties, such as The Century Plaza Hotel and St. Regis in Los Angeles, the Ritz Carlton in Phoenix, Harbor Bay and 650 California Street in San Francisco, and Promontory in Park City.

Najafi was a founding partner of Social Venture Partners, a philanthropic venture capital fund that invests in emerging nonprofit organizations, as well as the Arizona State University Committee for Design Excellence. He was named to the Phoenix Business Journal's Forty under 40 list in 2001.

He has also been on the board of directors for the Phoenix Symphony and Phoenix Metropolitan Area Convention and Visitors Bureau, and as chair of the board of trustees of Phoenix Country Day School.

He is part owner and vice chairman of the Phoenix Suns professional basketball team and a governor on the board of the National Basketball Association. After majority owner Robert Sarver was suspended from team operations for one year that stated Sarver “engaged in conduct that clearly violated common workplace standards ... included the use of racially insensitive language; unequal treatment of female employees; sex-related statements and conduct; and harsh treatment of employees that on occasion constituted bullying” Najafi called on Sarver to resign. When Robert Sarver eventually sold the team to new ownership led by Mat Ishbia and his brother Justin Ishbia, Najafi was one of three minority team owners to keep all their stakes with the team once the sale went through on February 7, 2023.

The Najafi Companies (Najafi Cos.), a private-equity firm, was established in 2002. Najafi, head of the company, invests only his own capital. The company makes investments across industries with significant holdings in consumer, media, sports, travel, ecommerce, retail and technology.

In December 2020, Najafi was announced as the next vice-chairman of McLaren Racing, a Formula One constructor.

== Investments ==
In 2003, Najafi, through Najafi Cos., purchased Network Solutions from Verisign Inc. for $20 million. In 2007, it sold Network Solutions to General Atlantic for $800 million. Najafi led the company through the acquisitions of the Pert Plus shampoo brand and Sure deodorant brand from Procter & Gamble in 2006, and Trend Homes Inc. in 2008, Also in 2008, Najafi and Najafi Cos. purchased Direct Group, the parent company of the Book of the Month Club, Columbia House and BMG Music Service, from Bertelsmann AG, a German book publisher. The company later acquired the France, Belgium, Switzerland and Quebec operations of Direct Group.

Najafi and his company Najafi Cos. were named highest bidder in negotiations to buy out Borders from bankruptcy protection in 2011. The bid fell through when Borders was liquidated. Najafi and Najafi Cos. also bid to buy The Boston Globe in 2013.

In 2017, Najafi Cos. bid for ownership of Time Inc. Time is the owner of publications including Sports Illustrated, Fortune and People. Opposing bids came from former Warner Music Group executive Edgar Bronfman Jr., Iowa-based company Meredith Corporation, and private equity firm Pamplona Capital Management.

Najafi Cos. invested in 2018 in the brand studio, Beach House Group, the parent and operating company of several consumer brands with celebrity co-founders including Beis with Shay Mitchell in travel, Moon with Kendall Jenner in Oral Care and Pattern with Tracee Ellis Ross in haircare. Najafi invested in 2021 in Scarlett Johansson's eco-friendly, plant-based skincare line, The Outset.

Classic Vacations announced that a definitive purchase agreement has been signed by Najafi Cos. to acquire all the assets of Classic Vacations from Expedia Group effective April 2, 2021.

On April 22, 2022, The Najafi Companies closed its acquisition of STX Entertainment from ErosSTX.

On October 26, 2022, MSP Sports Capital (known in part for its investment in McLaren Formula One Racing Team) announced that it has acquired a majority interest from ESPN Productions for the X Games.

== Personal life ==
Najafi and his wife, Cheryl Najafi, live in Arizona with their three children.

== Bibliography ==
- Jahm Najafi (1987). Elements of Design for a Commercial Mortgage Security: An Issuer's Primer. Roberta Paula Books, Salomon Bros.
