= Techzone 56060 =

Techzone
- Type: Private
- Industry: Telecommunication
- Founded: 1999; 27 years ago
- Founder: Naveen Bhandari
- Headquarters: Chennai, India
- Key people: Naveen Bhandari
- Products: Mobile content & Value Added Services
- Website: 56060.in

TechZone is one of the largest aggregators, publishers and distributors of entertainment content on mobile in India. With Exclusive rights to one of the largest library of music and video titles, Techzone is the largest player in providing Bollywood content on mobile and also captures majority of the Tamil markets. With exclusive content rights for top brands such as Times Music, 9XMedia, UTV, Radio City, MTV, and more. Techzone also dominates the international music market on mobile in India and captures majority of it. It powers more than two-thirds of all Mobile Digital Entertainment content in India and internationally, and run the short code 56060 across all operators in India.

Techzone digitizes, uploads and promotes content on CRBT platform across all operators in India. Techzone has the largest market share on CRBT across operators in India. Techzone distributes and markets contents of more than 200 other music labels for CRBT. The company has a strong distribution team spread across all circles to ensure maximum promotions.

== Founder ==
Mr. Naveen Bhandari is the founder and currently the managing director of Techzone. He started the company in the year 1999. His key responsibility is to handle & implement the strategic goals of the organization, acquisition and Investment decision.

Under Mr.Naveen's leadership, Techzone has created a presence for its own across all the operators Pan India since its inception. Techzone started way back in 1999 with a team of four people and have come to about 300 plus workers.

Techzone houses a 300 + worker team, which is in Sales and Marketing, Technical, Content Digitization and in house recording studio, New Product Development.

== History ==
The company launched a international music store on the internet. It was partnered with 9XO to create a unique international music store, offering online music that can be downloaded by music aficionados on to their computers and personal devices.

In 2012, the company also tied-up with Radio City 91.1 FM to offer a dedicated short code for consumer engagement and drive interactivity, allowing the radio network to promote its contests, polls, and other services through its SMS channel The same year the company partnered with Times Music to offer users devotional content to all leading operators.

It also tied-up with India TV as technology partner to provide SMS & WAP services for mobile users pan India. Techzone's short code 56060 will be used for on air polls, contest and various other audience interactive activities.

In partnership with Aircel, Techzone had launched Pocket Music International contest that would let Aircel customers stand a chance to win 4 bumper prizes of 2 iPhone 5 and two iPhone 4 along with recharge coupons for 1000 winners every month.

Besides, the company has also tied-up with Sunburn Festival to offer WAP page for international music. With this partnership, the audience got access to content like videos, artist trivia, gossips, program schedule, festival guide, photo gallery, voting options and more through CRBT and SMS services on mobile handsets through the short code 56060.

Techzone also partnered with Mood Indigo - the annual cultural festival of IIT Bombay, for offering a single platform to the participants for accessing unlimited international music via Playground, and valuable informative content on Mood Indigo via WAP and SMS services.

The grand inter collegiate event AC Tech-Anna University Kalakrithi 2013 was another event that was powered by Techzone for offering real-time SMS updates and information about the various events scheduled, their dates and timings, celebrities involved, venue etc., by simply messaging Kalakrithi to 56060.

== Products ==
=== Magic Voice ===
Magic Voice is a patented, IVR based solution which allows user to change their voice in various (voices) ways and speak to their friends or to anyone. The voice changing happens on the fly as ‘A party’ speaks to ‘B party’.

This service is a plug and play solution and can be integrated with Telecom Operator's networks.

=== Playground ===
Techzone's music property Playground is the first of its international mobile store for Indian mobile user.

Customer can download more than 200000+ International music tracks from Sony Music International.

=== Dethadi ===
Dethadi is a single page, portal that offers Telugu cinema content on single platform. The portal has got different categories which have Wallpapers, Animations, Full tracks, MP3 and Videos from Tollywood.

=== Music Box ===
Techzone also has Music Box as one of the services. It provides the listeners with the option to listen to Hindi, Tamil, Telugu, Kannada and Malayalam songs. The users also get the option to set the songs they are listening to as their CRBT for everyone to hear.
