= Prem Parameswaran =

American businessman (born 1968)

- Born: Prem Parameswaran; 1968 (age 57–58)
- Education: Columbia University
- Occupation: Businessman
- Title: Chief Financial Officer and President at Triller

Prem Parameswaran (born October 4, 1968) is the Chief Financial Officer and President of Triller.

== Early life ==
Parameswaran was born in the US to Indian parents and grew up in Scarsdale, New York. He currently resides in Purchase, New York with his three children, Trinity, Kayla and Hudson. Parameswaran graduated from Columbia University in 1990 with a BA in Political Science and received an MBA with honors from Columbia Business School in 1995. While at Columbia, Parameswaran was a defenseman on the Columbia University hockey team.

== Career ==
Parameswaran most recently was with Eros International, a leading company in the Indian film entertainment industry, where he served as Chief Financial Officer and President of North America.

He has worked at Jefferies Group as Global Head of Media and Telecommunications Investment Banking and at Deutsche Bank as Head of Media & Telecom for the Americas. He has also worked at Goldman Sachs, Salomon Brothers, and numerous other companies.

Parameswaran serves on the Board of Directors of Kare Partners. He is also on the boards of the Columbia University Alumni Trustee Nominating Committee and the Program for Financial Studies at Columbia Business School. He established the Prem Parameswaran Family Scholarship at Columbia Business School. In 2017, Parameswaran was invited to the White House Oval Office Reception for Diwali with President Trump.

In 2020, he was nominated by Donald Trump as a member of the Advisory Commission on Asian Americans and Pacific Islanders and is the only Indian on the 13-member commission and was sworn in on January 27, 2020. He was also reported to be one of the senior Indian officials that include Ajit Pai, Seema Verma, and Manisha Singh, who would accompany the president during his visit to India on February 24–25, 2020.
