= Paise Fek Tamasha Dekh =

Indian prank show

Paisa Fek Tamasha Dekh is a prank show, web mini-series directed by Nishant Sapkale and produced by Eros Motion Pictures and Box Office Films starring Rahul Purohit as the host. It is a 10-episode based show under Eros Now's new short-format video series- Quickie where pranksters play real-life practical jokes on the people around them.

== Cast and characters ==
- Rahul Purohit (Host)

== Episodes ==
No. Overall	No. in season	Title	Plot Outline
1	1	Hug It Out	Three contestants, three challenges, who will be called the ultimate prankster? Watch the full episode to find out.
2	2	Don't Hold Back	Have you ever helped anyone do the dirties in public? Well, these pranksters just managed that. Watch the full episode and laugh out loud.
3	3	Dance Till You Drop	Who are you placing your last dime on? In this dance-off of a prank, who do you think will be the last man standing?
4	4	Knockout	Have you ever played cricket without a ball? Watch these three contestants play a masterstroke.
5	5	A Shot Of Phenyl	Have you ever given having a shot of phenyl a shot? As bizarre as it might sound, our prankster get people to try it.
6	6	Mirror, Mirror On The Wall	Our pranksters need to get to an audition but will they manage to find a make-up man?
7	7	What's your OTP	From riding a skate bike in the mall to celebrating a stranger s birthday, these pranks will crack you up.
8	8	Kabaddi, Kabaddi, Kabaddi	Khel Kabaddi, win the money. Who will make the most money?
9	9	Dog Food Challenge	Will you eat dog food if anyone asked you to? Watch on to know if these pranksters succeed in pulling off this prank.
10	10	Mannequin Challenge	Watch this for screams and mini heart-attacks along with bouts of uncontrollable laughter.

== Release ==
The official trailer was released on 18 December 2018. Paisa Fek Tamasha Dekh was launched on 19 December 2018- all episodes streaming exclusively on Eros Now. It was one of the first series to be released under the category of Quickie.

== Theme ==
Paisa Fek Tamasha Dekh is a prank show based on practical jokes. It brings out comedy through hilarious scenes and challenges.
