= Tumse Na Ho Payega (web series) =

Indian web series

- Genre: Romance, Comedy
- Written by: Karl Katgara
- Directed by: Karl Katgara
- Presented by: Eros Now
- Starring: Aakash Deep Arora; Juhi Bhatt
- Country of origin: India
- Original language: Hindi
- No. of seasons: 1
- No. of episodes: 10

Production
- Executive producers: Vinod Skariah; Hemambika KT
- Cinematography: Mukesh Jain; Akshay R. Ahir
- Editors: Amar Nirmal; Sandesh Alolkar
- Camera setup: Abdul Kalam Azad
- Running time: 10-12 minutes
- Production companies: Eros Motion Pictures; Culture Machine

Original release
- Network: Eros Now
- Release: 12 January 2019

Tumse Na Ho Paayega is a 2019 Indian short-format web series produced by Eros Motion Pictures and Culture Machine. It is featured as a Eros Now Quickie and available for streaming at Eros Now. Juhi Bhatt debuted to acting through this series.

== Plot ==
Bala is new computer science engineer and had come into an office of Mumbai. He faces many new unexpected troubles in the office following some romance and tragedy in his life.

== Episodes ==
- Episode 1: Har Jungle Ke Hote Hai Apne Jaanwar
- Episode 2: Debut Pe Century
- Episode 3: Baby Steps
- Episode 4: Good One Zuckeberg
- Episode 5: Are You Really That Stupid?
- Episode 6: What Does An Escort Do?
- Episode 7: Google Shikaar Pe Nikla Hai
- Episode 8: Small World
- Episode 9: Hum Sab Hi Na Prostitutes Hai
- Episode 10: But I Love You

== Cast ==
- Aakash Deep Arora as Bala
- Juhi Bhatt as Jugnu
- Rajiv Rajaram as Venkat
- Anuradha Athlekar as Veronica
- Sanket Shanware as Budoydev Bhaiya/Buddy
- Maruf Ali as Mathur
- Trisha Kale as Pari
- Paromita Dey as Rachael

== Reception ==
Shraddha Raut of Webfare said it as a "short but sweet" web series having a A funny tale of friendship, love, and office and a man's struggle of fitting to a new city with some amazing background music at apt times. The Digital Hash mentioned it as "Even with its flaws, Tumse Na Ho Payega is a good addition to the list of home-grown streaming content"
