= Eros Now =

Indian VOD, OTT streaming platform

- Website type: OTT platform
- Available in: Hindi, English, Bangla, Tamil, Telugu, Gujarati, Kannada, Bhojpuri, Malayalam, Punjabi, Marathi, Kashmiri, Urdu
- Headquarters: Mumbai, Maharashtra, India
- Area served: Worldwide
- Owner: Eros Media World
- CEO: Ali Hussein
- Key people: Lokesh Chauhan (CTO)
- Industry: Entertainment; mass media
- Products: Streaming media; video on demand; digital distribution
- Services: Film production; film distribution; television production
- Website: erosnow.com
- Commercial: Yes
- Registration: Required
- Users: 211.5 million (36.2 million paid)
- Launched: 2012; 14 years ago
- Current status: Active

Eros Now is an Indian subscription-based over-the-top, video on-demand entertainment and media platform, launched in 2012. It is owned and controlled by Eros Digital, the Indian digital media management arm of the Indian-American multinational media company Eros Media World. The network offers media streaming and video-on-demand services.

== History and growth ==
Founded in the year 1977, Eros International plc started its business with movie acquisitions and within a few years it went on to become India's first distributors of VHS. In the year 2012, when Eros launched Eros Now, its digital on-demand entertainment platform, the company got transformed into a fully vertically integrated studio. Eros Now targets the 1.5 billion population of Indian Entertainment world over. In the initial launch phase, Eros Now started with films and music videos as its primary content. From 2012 to 2018, it has added content such as short films, web-series and specially curated content under the originals bouquet. Eros Now has also tied- up with various leading telecom and content players to stay ahead of the curve.

=== Original programs ===
In January 2018, Eros Now premiered their first short- film 'Toffee' starring Syna Anand and Sammaera Jaiswal. In February 2018, Eros Now made an announcement of rolling out its original content in the second half of the year, which would include films, series, features and short-format films. In April 2018, Eros Now released India's first direct-to-digital film Meri Nimmo. And in September 2018, Eros Now launched its first original show 'Side Hero' directed by Rohan Sippy and starring Kunaal Roy Kapoor, Gauahar Khan, Gopal Dutt and Arjun Kanungo. Followed by the launch of flagship original web show 'Smoke' in October 2018 starring Tom Alter, Jim Sarbh, Mandira Bedi and Kalki Koechlin. Smoke was the only Indian web series to be showcased at the coveted annual event MIPCOM 2018 at Cannes in France under Made in India Originals category.

In December 2018, Eros Now further expanded its content strategy with the launch of Eros Now Quickie, a short video format segment. The first two Eros Now Quickies were Date Gone Wrong, Paise Fek Tamasha Dekh, started streaming on 19 December 2018. On 6 January 2019, Eros Now launched its third quickie, The Investigation which featured digital debut of television actor Hiten Tejwani playing the role of a Mumbai Crime Branch officer investigating a murder while Leena Jumani (Kumkum Bhagya and Punar Vivah) played his onscreen wife. On 12 January, the fourth Eros Now Quickie, Tum Se Na Ho Paayega was launched and featured Aakashdeep Arora and Juhi Bhatt in the lead role.

Eros Now launched its next original, Operation Cobra on 15 February. It marked the digital debut or television actor Gautam Gulati playing the role of a R.A.W. agent Karan Singh while Ruhi Singh and Nyra Banerjee essayed the role of MI6 agent Riya Sharma and terrorist Tahira Shaikh respectively. On 3 March 2019, Eros Now launched its next original, Metro Park. The show is directed by Abi Varghese, and stars Ranvir Shorey, Purbi Joshi, Vega Tamotia, Omi Vaidya and Pitobash.

== Subscription and subscriber base ==
Eros Now's business model is subscription based with three types of streaming membership plans. The basic plan (in India) includes access to standard definition quality streaming without functionality at INR 49. The plus plan (in India) allows unlimited access and functionality to streaming including access to HD streaming and features such as offline download, watch lists and playlists at INR 99. The premium plan (international) includes access to high definition and a full feature set. The pricing varies across countries i.e. USA US$7.99 per month, UK £4.99 GBP, UAE DHMS 20, Malaysia MYR10.

Eros Now has 128 million registered users and 30 million paying subscribers worldwide. (Total paid subscribers may include those who are on a paid, free-trial or via minimum guarantee as long as a method of payment has been provided.)

Eros Now has 18 million subscribers on YouTube and it is one of the Top 100 most subscribed YouTube channels in India.

== Partnerships ==
=== Telecom partnerships ===
| When | Partnership | Details |
|---|---|---|
| January 2016 | Idea Cellular | Eros Now offered Idea's 4G subscribers access to Eros Now's premium bundled services including movies, music, TV content and Eros Now originals. |
| April 2016 | Maxis Communications and U Mobile | Eros Now entered the Malaysian market by this partnership. As part of the partnership with Maxis, Eros Now was included within a range of Maxis' prepaid and post-paid data plans, offering various promotions to the telecom subscribers. The deal with U Mobile enabled the telecom's pre- and post-paid customers' access to Eros Now's premium subscriptions. |
| August 2016 | Reliance Jio | The initiative allowed consumers to access the high quality Eros Now service within the Jio ecosystem. This partnership helped Eros Now with the opportunity to acquire new subscribers throughout urban and rural India. |
| November 2016 | Vodafone | Eros Now announced a distribution partnership with Vodafone or integration with Vodafone Play. With this partnership, Vodafone Play users were able to access Eros Now's Bollywood content offering. |
| February 2017 | BSNL | Eros Now announced its association with SpeedPay – a multi-purpose offline wallet and Indian state owned telecommunications provider, Bharat Sanchar Nigam Ltd (BSNL) |

=== Platform alliances ===
| When | Partnership | Details |
|---|---|---|
| December 2014 | Chromecast | Eros Now offered Chromecast customers a range of subscription offers. The offer was valid with the purchase of Chromecast in India through their then official retail partners Snapdeal and Airtel |
| January 2016 | LeEco | Eros Now was integrated within the LeEco ecosystem of internet enabled smartphones and smart televisions with a one-year premium subscription to Eros Now service |
| May 2016 | Amazon Fire TV | Eros Now showcased its content to Amazon Fire TV users across the US, UK and Western Europe |
| June 2016 | Apple TV | Eros Now started showcasing its content repository across Apple TV's presence in 80 key countries including USA, UK, India, Canada, Australia, and Malaysia |
| June 2016 | Micromax | With this partnership, Micromax's latest smartphones came pre-installed with the Eros Now App. |
| July 2016 | Android TV | Eros Now made the announcement of its content library being available on Android TV across the globe |
| December 2016 | LycaTV | Eros Now announced that it was available on LycaTV platform. The service of the alliance were included in Tamil, Sinhala and African packages |
| April 2017 | Amazon Fire TV Stick | Fire TV customers received a three-month free premium subscription to Eros Now |
| April 2017 | Ola Play | Ola Play entered into a revenue-sharing partnership with Eros Now which enabled customers to watch Eros Now content that could be seamlessly controlled through their smartphones as well as a device mounted at the back of the seat |
| May 2017 | Sony Smart TV | Eros Now was available across 197 Sony devices, namely all the latest (2016–17) smart TVs and Blu-ray players worldwide |
| May 2017 | T-Mobile | Catering to 71.5 million users across the US, Eros Now announced a partnership with T-Mobile's video streaming program Binge On |
| June 2017 | Smarton | Eros Now announced exclusive digital OTT service partnership with Smartron, a Sachin Tendulkar-backed India-based IoT start-up |
| August 2017 | Opera TV | Eros Now was made available on all Opera TV powered devices including Smart TVs, Blu-ray disc players and set-top boxes worldwide in. |
| November 2017 | Roku | The partnership enabled the device users to stream Eros Now's vast content library at $7.99 per month in the US, Canada and UK |
| December 2017 | Foxxum | Eros Now entered a strategic partnership with Foxxum to provide its vast library of content on the Foxxum TV App Store worldwide |
| November 2017 | LG Smart TVs | Eros Now was made available on webOS enabled LG smart TVs worldwide with a preferred placement for the Eros Now App on all Indian LG devices |
| July 2018 | Xiaomi India | Eros Now will be available within Patchwall on all Mi TVs sold in India |
| September 2018 | Xiaomi Indonesia | Mi TV users will have access to Eros Now's compelling bouquet of 11,000+ Bollywood and Regional language films, entertainment shows, music videos and originals at a monthly subscription of IDR 26,000 (US$7.99) |
| September 2018 | iQiyi | Eros Now partnered with the Baidu-owned Chinese streaming giant for a content agreement to license its vast catalogue of Bollywood blockbusters that will be showcased on iQiyi |
| September 2018 | FTV | Eros Now subscribers have access to 12+ Linear TV channels of FTV along with 145+ hours of On-Demand Content |
| October 2018 | Etisalat – eLife | The strategic partnership with E-Vision, a fully owned subsidiary of Etisalat, for its SVOD offering 'eLife Video Packs'. Eros Now further strengthens its existing presence in MENA region (Middle East and North Africa). |
| November 2018 | Freesat | The partnership with Freesat allows Freesat consumers (across the UK) for a subscription fee of £5.99 per month. |
| December 2018 | Axiata Group | The partnership with Axiata Indonesia allows the consumers for a subscription fee of Rp 26,000 ($1.79) monthly and Rp 260,000 ($17.93) annually. |

=== Advertising partnership ===
| When | Partnership | Details |
|---|---|---|
| August 2018 | InMobi | The association will enable advertisers to directly monetize on Eros Now's video platform and a unique opportunity to experience an end-to-end playbook that spans innovative video and ad formats. Eros Now will also adopt InMobi's disruptive mobile-first advertising platform to market content through the in-app video universe across India. |

== Sponsorship ==
Eros Now was the title sponsor of Royal Challengers Bangalore in Indian Premiere League 2018.

== Key people ==
- Rishika Lulla, the CEO of Eros Digital, covers all of the digital initiatives for Eros including Eros Now.
- Ali-Hussein-appointed-as-COO—Eros-Digital
- Ridhima Lulla, the Chief Content Officer of Eros Now strengthens the original content strategy for Eros Now.
- Lokesh Chauhan is the Chief Technology Officer of Eros

== Awards and recognitions ==
- In 2016, The Economic Times named Eros Now as one of the 7 hottest rivals of Netflix in India.
