= Eros International =

Indian motion picture production and distribution company

Eros International Media Ltd.
- Formerly: Rishima International Pvt Ltd; Eros Multimedia Pvt Ltd; Eros Labs; Eros International Media Pvt Ltd; Eros Entertainment
- Type: Public
- Traded as: BSE: 533261; NSE: EROSMEDIA
- ISIN: INE416L01017
- Industry: Media & Entertainment
- Founded: 1977; 49 years ago Mumbai, Maharashtra, India
- Founder: Arjan Lulla; Kishore Lulla
- Headquarters: 901-902, 9th Floor, Supreme Chambers, Veera Desai Road, Andheri (West), Mumbai, India
- Area served: Worldwide
- Key people: Kishore Lulla (Executive director and CEO, Eros plc); Sunil Lulla (Executive Vice Chairman & Managing Director); Prem Parameswaran (Executive director and CFO) Pradeep Dwivedi (CEO, Eros India)
- Products: Film Production; Film distribution Marketing; Music; Studio; Vfx; Post production Theatrical Distribution; Digital; Mobile content & Value Added Services
- Services: Film production, co-production, acquisition and distribution
- Revenue: ▼₹1000 Crore (US$ 134.94 Million) (FY 2018)
- Total equity: ▲₹13.4 Crore (US$ 32 Million)
- Parent: Eros Media World
- Divisions: Eros Music; Next Gen Films; Trinity Pictures; Immerso Studios
- Subsidiaries: Big Screen Entertainment; Colour Yellow Productions; Copsale; Digicine; Eros Animation; Eros International Films; Eros International Distribution; Eros Music Publishing; Eyeqube Studios; Techzone 56060 See Subsidiaries
- Website: Eros International

Eros International is an Indian motion picture production and distribution company, based and originated in Mumbai, India. Founded by Arjan Lulla in 1977, it is one of the leading production and distribution companies in India. Currently, his sons Kishore Lulla and Sunil Lulla manage the company. It is a subsidiary of Eros Media World, formed in 2020, which was formerly known as Eros International Plc and subsequently ErosSTX Global.

Eros co-produces, acquires and distributes Indian films in multiple formats worldwide, including theatrical, television syndication and digital platforms. Eros has over 12,000 films in its library which include Hindi, Tamil, Telugu and other regional language films.

== History ==
In 1977, Arjan Lulla started the company. In 1981, he founded the company Jupiter Enterprise with Mr. Kishore Lulla and Ms. Bhagibhai Lulla. On 19 August 1994 Rishima International Pvt Ltd was founded. It was a private limited company. Through its subsidiary "Eros International Films", the company produced and distributed films. On 1 April 1999, the company acquired the entire Jupiter Enterprise. Their first jointly produced film was Waqt (2005). On 25 July 2000, the name was changed to Eros Multimedia Private Limited. The name was again changed to Eros International Pvt Ltd on 20 November 2008. On 16 September 2009, the company was converted into a public limited company and on 18 November, the name was changed to the present name Eros International Media Ltd. In 2010, Eros International Media Limited was listed on the Bombay Stock Exchange (BSE) and National Stock Exchange (NSE) in India. The name Eros was chosen after the Greek god of love.

== Subsidiaries ==
=== Current ===
- Colour Yellow Productions (50% share)
- Copsale
- Digicine
- Eros Animation
- Eros International Films
- Eros International Distribution (99.8% share)
- Eros Music Publishing
- Eyeqube Studios (99.9% share)
- Techzone 56060

=== Former ===
- Ayngaran International (51% share)
- HBO Hits (India) (50% share)

=== Joint ventures ===
- Reliance Eros Productions (joint Venture with Reliance Industries)

== Partnerships ==
In 2008, Eros International made a deal with Universal Music Group to make a joint-venture to promote pop music to India. The agreement was announced by Kishore Lulla and Max Hole, President of Universal Music Asia Pacific Region and Executive Vice President, Universal Music Group International (UMGI) on 10 December though the joint venture was officiated with a contractual signing on 18 November. Rajat Kakar, managing director of Universal Music India was appointed as the chairperson and Sunil Lulla and Jyoti Deshpande, former COO of Eros International Group, are on the board of directors. That same year, the company formed a joint venture with Lionsgate. The two companies would also co-produce films with budgets ranging from $10 to 20 million. Eros and Lionsgate also received access to each other's library, with Eros planning to air Lionsgate's TV shows such as Weeds and Mad Men and Lionsgate distributing some of Eros' Hindi films in North America such as Om Shanti Om, Gandhi, My Father and Eklavya: The Royal Guard.

== Awards ==
Year of award	Film	Award	Category	Recipient
2016	Bajirao Mastani	Star Screen Awards	Best Actor (male)	Ranveer Singh
2016	Bajirao Mastani	Star Screen Awards	Popular choice (female)	Deepika Padukone
2016	Bajirao Mastani	Star Screen Awards	Best supporting actor	Priyanka Chopra
2016	Bajirao Mastani	Star Screen Awards	Best special effects	Eros International
2016	Bajrangi Bhaijaan	Star Screen Awards	Best Film (Critics)	Eros International
2016	Bajrangi Bhaijaan	Star Screen Awards	Best director	Kabir Khan
2016	Bajrangi Bhaijaan	Star Screen Awards	Best story	V. Vijayendra Prasad
2016	Bajrangi Bhaijaan	Star Screen Awards	Best Background Score	Julius Packiam
2016	Tanu Weds Manu Returns	Star Screen Awards	Best Supporting Actor	Dipak Dobriyal
2016	Bajrangi Bhaijaan	Stardust Awards	Best Director	Kabir Khan
2016	Bajrangi Bhaijaan	Stardust Awards	Best Film of the Year	Eros International
2016	Bajrangi Bhaijaan	Stardust Awards	Breakthrough Performance by a Child Artiste	Harshaali Malhotra
2016	Badlapur	Stardust Awards	Best Story	Sriram Raghavan and Arijit Biswas
2016	Hero	Stardust Awards	Best Playback Singer (Male)	Armaan Malik for Main Hoon Hero Tera
2016	Hero	Stardust Awards	Best Debut (Male)	Sooraj Pancholi
2016	Hero	Stardust Awards	Best Debut Couple	Sooraj Pancholi and Athiya Shetty
2016	Bajirao Mastani	Filmfare Awards	Best Director	Sanjay Leela Bhansali
2016	Bajirao Mastani	Filmfare Awards	Best Actor (Male)	Ranveer Singh
2016	Bajirao Mastani	Filmfare Awards	Best Film	Eros International
2016	Bajirao Mastani	Filmfare Awards	Best Actor in Supporting Role (female)	Priyanka Chopra
2016	Bajirao Mastani	Filmfare Awards	Best Costume	Anju Modi and Maxima Basu
2016	Bajirao Mastani	Filmfare Awards	Best Production Design	Sujeet Sawant, Sriram Iyengar and Saloni Dhatrak
2016	Bajirao Mastani	Filmfare Awards	Best Action	Sham Kaushal
2016	Bajirao Mastani	Filmfare Awards	Best Playback (Female)	Shreya Goshal
2016	Bajirao Mastani	Filmfare Awards	Best Choreography	Pandit Birju Maharaj for Mohe Rang Do Laal
2016	Bajrangi Bhaijaan	Filmfare Awards	Best Story	Vijayendra Prasad
2016	Hero	Filmfare Awards	Best Debut (Male)	Sooraj Pancholi
2016	Tanu Weds Manu Returns	Filmfare Awards	Best Dialogue	Himanshu Sharma
2016	Tanu Weds Manu Returns	Filmfare Awards	Critics' Awards for Best Actor (Female)	Kangana Ranaut
2016	Bajirao Mastani	Sony Guild Awards	Best Director	Sanjay Leela Bhansali
2016	Bajirao Mastani	Sony Guild Awards	Best Actor	Ranveer Singh
2016	Bajirao Mastani	Sony Guild Awards	Best Cinematography	Sudeep Chatterjee
2016	Bajirao Mastani	Sony Guild Awards	Best Art Direction	
2016	Bajirao Mastani	Sony Guild Awards	Best Sound Design	Eros International
2016	Bajirao Mastani	Sony Guild Awards	Best Costume Design	Eros International
2016	Bajirao Mastani	Sony Guild Awards	Best Dialogue	
2016	Bajirao Mastani	Sony Guild Awards	Best Choreography	Remo D'souza
2016	Bajrangi Bhaijaan	Sony Guild Awards	Best Film	Eros International
2016	Bajrangi Bhaijaan	Sony Guild Awards	Best Screenplay	Kabir Khan, Parveez Sheikh, V. Vijayendra Prasad
2016	Bajrangi Bhaijaan	Sony Guild Awards	Best Story	V. Vijayendra Prasad
2016	Bajrangi Bhaijaan	Sony Guild Awards	Best Actor in a Supporting Role	Nawazuddin Siddiqui
2016	Bajrangi Bhaijaan	Sony Guild Awards	Best Child Artist	Harshali Malhotra
2016	Badlapur	Sony Guild Awards	Best Sound Mixing	
2016	Tanu weds Manu Returns	Sony Guild Awards	Best actor in a Comic Role	Deepak Dobriyal
2016	Badlapur	Sony Guild Awards	Best Actor in a Negative Role	Nawazuddin Siddiqui
2015	Tanu Weds Manu Returns	ETC Bollywood Business Awards 2015	Most Popular Trailer	
2015	Tanu Weds Manu Returns	ETC Bollywood Business Awards 2015	100 Crore Club	
2015	Welcome Back	ETC Bollywood Business Awards 2015	100 Crore Club	
2015	Bajirao Mastani	ETC Bollywood Business Awards 2015	100 Crore Club	
2015	Bajrangi Bhaijaan	ETC Bollywood Business Awards 2015	300 Crore Club	
2015	Bajrangi Bhaijaan	ETC Bollywood Business Awards 2015	Top Grosser of the Year	
2015	Bajrangi Bhaijaan	ETC Bollywood Business Awards 2015	Studio of the Year	Eros International
2015	Bajrangi Bhaijaan	ETC Bollywood Business Awards 2015	Excellence In International Distribution Award	Eros International
2015	Bajrangi Bhaijaan	ETC Bollywood Business Awards 2015	Special Awards for Film Distribution in Mumbai, Delhi-UP, East Punjab, West Bengal and Mysore (Individual trophies)	Eros International

== See also ==
- Eros Now
- List of film production companies in India
