= List of Hindi films of 2016 =

This is a list of Bollywood films that were released in 2016.

Dangal emerged as the highest-grossing Hindi film ever.

== Box office collection ==
The highest-grossing Bollywood films released in 2016, by worldwide box office gross revenue, are as follows:

Highest-grossing films of 2016
Rank	Title	Distributor	Worldwide gross	Ref.
1	Dangal	UTV Motion Pictures	₹2,160 crore (US$331.69 million)	(Note: Dangal worldwide gross: ₹2,160.3 crore (US$331.73 million): India — ₹538 crore (US$56 million); Overseas — ₹1,622.3 crore (US$245.4 million); Chinese markets — ₹1,394.1 crore (US$140 million); China — ₹1,330 crore (US$140 million); Taiwan — ₹41 crore (US$4.3 million); Hong Kong — ₹23.1 crore (US$3.5 million); Other territories — US$33.4 million (₹228.2 crore))
2	Sultan	Yash Raj Films	₹631.25 crore (US$96.93 million)	(Note: Sultan worldwide gross: ₹631.25 crore (US$96.93 million): Domestic: ₹421.25 crore (US$44 million); Overseas: ₹168 crore (US$17 million))
3	Ae Dil Hai Mushkil	Fox Star Studios	₹239.56 crore (US$35.65 million)	
4	Rustom	Zee Studios	₹216.35 crore (US$32.2 million)	
5	M.S. Dhoni: The Untold Story	Fox Star Studios	₹215.48 crore (US$32.07 million)	
6	Airlift	Viacom 18 Motion Pictures; T-Series	₹209.97 crore (US$31.25 million)	
7	Housefull 3	Eros International	₹194.94 crore (US$29.01 million)	
8	Fan	Yash Raj Films	₹188.04 crore (US$27.98 million)	
9	Kapoor & Sons	Fox Star Studios	₹143.29 crore (US$21.32 million)	
10	Shivaay	Reliance Entertainment	₹124.15 crore (US$18.48 million)	

Dangal grossed over ₹2,209.3 crore (US$339.26 million) worldwide and is currently the highest-grossing Indian film of all time. Sultan has grossed over ₹631.25 crore (US$66 million) worldwide and is the 15th highest-grossing Indian film of all time.

== January–March ==
Opening		Title	Director	Cast	Genre	Studio	Ref.
J A N	8	Chhota Bheem Himalayan Adventures	Rajiv Chilaka		Animation	Green Gold Animation	
J A N	8	Wazir	Bejoy Nambiar	Amitabh Bachchan, Farhan Akhtar, Aditi Rao Hydari, Manav Kaul, Neil Nitin Mukesh, John Abraham, Murali Sharma, Avtar Gill	Thriller	Reliance Entertainment, Vinod Chopra Films, Getaway Films	
J A N	15	Chalk n Duster	Jayant Gilatar	Shabana Azmi, Juhi Chawla, Divya Dutta, Zarina Wahab, Jackie Shroff, Arya Babbar, Richa Chadha	Drama	Sony Pictures India, Surani Pictures	
J A N	15	Rebellious Flower	Krishan Hooda	Prince Shah, Shashank Singh, Mantra Mugdha, Kirti Adarkar, Bachchan Pachera, Shaneel Sinha	Biopic	Zenin Multimedia Productions	
J A N	22	Airlift	Raja Krishna Menon	Akshay Kumar, Nimrat Kaur, Purab Kohli, Ferena Wazeir, Gunjan Malhotra	War/Thriller	T-Series Films, Hari Om Entertainment, Cape of Good Films, Emmay Entertainment, Abundantia Entertainment, Viacom18 Motion Pictures	
J A N	22	Jugni	Shefali Bhushan	Sugandha Garg, Siddhant Behl, Sadhana Singh, Anuritta K Jha, Samir Sharma	Musical drama	PVR Pictures, Dhun Productions	
J A N	22	Kyaa Kool Hain Hum 3	Umesh Ghadge	Tushar Kapoor, Aftab Shivdasani, Mandana Karimi, Meghna Naidu, Darshan Jariwala, Krushna Abhishek, Claudia Ciesla, Riteish Deshmukh, Gizele Thakral, VJ Andy, Danny Saru	Adult comedy	Balaji Motion Pictures, ALT Entertainment	
J A N	29	Saala Khadoos	Sudha Kongara Prasad	R. Madhavan, Ritika Singh, Zakir Hussain	Sports	UTV Motion Pictures, Tricolour Films, Rajkumar Hirani Films, YNOT Studios	
J A N	29	Mastizaade	Milap Milan Zaveri	Tushar Kapoor, Vir Das, Sunny Leone, Shaad Randhawa, Riteish Deshmukh, Gizele Thakral, Bruna Abdullah	Adult comedy	Pen Studios, Panorama Studios, Pritish Nandy Communications	
F E B	5	Sanam Teri Kasam	Radhika Rao, Vinay Sapru	Mawra Hocane, Harshvardhan Rane, Anurag Sinha, Shraddha Das	Romance	Eros International, Soham Rockstar Entertainment, Jhoom Jhoom Productions	
F E B	5	Ghayal: Once Again	Sunny Deol	Sunny Deol, Soha Ali Khan, Aanchal Munjal, Daina Khan, Shivam Patil, Rishabh Arora, Abhilash Kumar	Action/drama	Reliance Entertainment, B4U Motion Pictures, PVR Cinemas, Sunny Sounds, Vijayta Films	
F E B	12	Fitoor	Abhishek Kapoor	Aditya Roy Kapoor, Katrina Kaif, Tabu, Ajay Devgn, Aditi Rao Hydari, Akshay Oberoi, Lara Dutta, Rahul Bhatt	Romance/drama	UTV Motion Pictures, Guy In The Sky Pictures	
F E B	12	Sanam Re	Divya Khosla Kumar	Pulkit Samrat, Yami Gautam, Urvashi Rautela, Rishi Kapoor, Bharti Singh, Shreyas Pardiwalla	Romance	T-Series Films	
F E B	19	Direct Ishq	Rajiv S. Ruia	Rajneesh Duggal, Nidhi Subbaiah, Arjun Bijlani	Drama	Baba Motion Pictures	
F E B	19	Ishq Forever	Sameer Sippy	Krishna Chaturvedi, Ruhi Singh, Javed Jaffrey, Lisa Ray	Drama	Friday Cine Entertainment	
F E B	19	LoveShhuda	Vaibhav Mishra	Girish Kumar, Navneet Kaur Dhillon, Benaf Dadachandji, Yash Pandit	Romance	Galani Entertainments	
F E B	19	Neerja	Ram Madhvani	Sonam Kapoor, Shabana Azmi, Shekhar Ravjiani	Biopic/drama	Fox Star Studios, Bling Unplugged	
F E B	26	Dhara 302	Jitender Singh Narukal	Rufy Khan, Dipti Dhotre, Gulshan Pandey	Actiom/drama		
F E B	26	Aligarh	Hansal Mehta	Manoj Bajpayee, Rajkummar Rao	Biopic/drama	Eros International, Karma Features	
F E B	26	Bollywood Diaries	K.D. Satyam	Raima Sen, Ashish Vidyarthi, Salim Diwan, Karuna Pandey, Vineet Kumar Singh	Drama	Zee Studios, Rehab Pictures, Eagle Eye Entertainment	
F E B	26	Love Shagun	Sandesh Nayak	Anuj Sachdeva, Nidhi Subbaiah, Manit Joura	Romance/comedy	Saanvi Nayak Films	
F E B	26	Tere Bin Laden: Dead or Alive	Abhishek Sharma	Manish Paul, Sikander Kher, Pradhuman Singh, Sugandha Ram	Comedy	Phantom Films, Walkwater Media, Shivantika Productions	
M A R	4	Zubaan	Mozez Singh	Vicky Kaushal, Sarah Jane Dias, Raghav Chanana	Drama	Wave Cinemas, Metamozez Entertainment, Sikhya Entertainment	
M A R	4	Jai Gangaajal	Prakash Jha	Priyanka Chopra, Anuj Aggarwal, Prakash Jha, Rahul Bhatt	Drama/comedy	Prakash Jha Productions, Play Entertainments	
M A R	11	Global Baba	Manoj Sidheshwari Tewari	Abhimanyu Singh, Sandeepa Dhar, Ravi Kishan, Pankaj Tripathi, Sanjay Mishra, Akhilendra Mishra	Satire		
M A R	11	Teraa Surroor	Shawn Arranha	Himesh Reshammiya, Farah Karimi, Monica Dogra, Naseeruddin Shah, Shekhar Kapur	Action/thriller/romance	T-Series Films, HR Musik	
M A R	11	OK Mein Dhokhe	Utpal S. Chaudhary	Zoya Rathore, Sapan Krishna, Vaidhei Singh, Megha Verma, Ravi Thakur, Milan Singh	Drama/thriller	Lotus Media & Films	
M A R	11	Darling Don't Cheat	Rajkumar Hindusthani	Gaurav Pandey, Ashish Tyagi, Neha Chaterji	Drama/thriller		
M A R	18	Kapoor & Sons	Shakun Batra	Sidharth Malhotra, Alia Bhatt, Fawad Khan, Rishi Kapoor, Sukant Goel	Drama/comedy	Fox Star Studios, Dharma Productions	
M A R	25	Rocky Handsome	Nishikant Kamat	John Abraham, Shruti Haasan, Nathalia Kaur	Action	Reliance Entertainment, JA Entertainment, Azure Entertainment	

== April–June ==
Opening		Title	Director	Cast	Genre	Studio	Ref.
A P R	1	Ki & Ka	R. Balki	Kareena Kapoor Khan, Arjun Kapoor, Amitabh Bachchan, Jaya Bachchan	Romantic comedy	Eros International, Hope Productions	
A P R	8	Love Games	Vikram Bhatt	Patralekha, Tara Alisha Berry, Gaurav Arora	Thriller	T-Series Films, Vishesh Films	
A P R	8	The Blueberry Hunt	Anup Kurien	Naseeruddin Shah, Vipin Sharma, Vinay Forrt	Thriller	Springboard Films, Divine Thought Productions, Visual Possibility, Brand Stand	
A P R	10	Kaafiron Ki Namaaz	Ram Ramesh Sharma	Alok Chaturvedi, Joydip Mukhopadhyay, Megh Pant, Priya Raina, Chandrahas Tiwari	Drama		
A P R	15	Fan	Maneesh Sharma	Shah Rukh Khan, Waluscha de Sousa, Sayani Gupta, Shriya Pilgaonkar	Action/drama/thriller	Yash Raj Films	
A P R	22	Nil Battey Sannata	Ashwini Iyer Tiwari	Swara Bhaskar, Ratna Pathak, Pankaj Tripathi, Sanjay Suri	Comedy/drama	Eros International, Colour Yellow Productions, JAR Pictures, Opticus INC	
A P R	22	Laal Rang	Syed Ahmad Afzal	Randeep Hooda, Akshay Oberoi, Rajneesh Duggal, Piaa Bajpai	Action	Krian Pictures	
A P R	22	Santa Banta Pvt Ltd	Akashdeep Sabir	Vir Das, Boman Irani, Ram Kapoor, Neha Dhupia, Lisa Haydon	Comedy	Viacom 18 Motion Pictures, Cinetek Telefilms	
A P R	29	Baaghi	Sabbir Khan	Tiger Shroff, Shraddha Kapoor, Sudheer Babu, Sunil Grover	Action	UTV Motion Pictures, Nadiadwala Grandson Entertainment	
A P R	29	Shortcut Safari	Amitabha Singh	Jimmy Shergill, Aashi Rawal, Sharvil Patel, Mann Patel, Ugam Khetani, Stuti Dwivedi, Deah Tandon, Hardil Kanaba	Adventure, drama	Xebec Films	
M A Y	6	One Night Stand	Jasmine Moses D'Souza	Sunny Leone, Tanuj Virwani, Nyra Banerjee	Thriller	Swiss Entertainment	
M A Y	6	Traffic	Rajesh Pillai	Manoj Bajpayee, Jimmy Sheirgill, Divya Dutta, Kitu Gidwani, Prosenjit Chatterjee, Sachin Khedekar, Nikita Thukral, Vishal Singh, Jishnu Raghavan, Parambrata Chatterjee	Thriller	Fox Star Studios, Endemol Shine India	
M A Y	6	1920: London	Tinu Suresh Desai	Sharman Joshi, Meera Chopra, Vishal Karwal	Horror	Reliance Entertainment	
M A Y	6	Murari the Mad Gentleman			Comedy		
M A Y	13	Azhar	Tony D'Souza	Emraan Hashmi, Nargis Fakhri, Prachi Desai, Gautam Gulati, Kunaal Roy Kapur, Lara Dutta, Karanvir Sharma	Biopic	Balaji Motion Pictures, Sony Pictures Networks	
M A Y	13	Buddha in a Traffic Jam	Vivek Agnihotri	Arunoday Singh, Mahie Gill, Anchal Dwivedi, Pallavi Joshi, Anupam Kher	Political drama		
M A Y	13	Khel Toh Ab Shuru Hoga	Kunal V Singh	Ruslaan Mumtaz, Devshi Khanduri	Comedy	GMD Films	
M A Y	16	Dear Dad	Tanuj Bhramar	Arvind Swamy, Himanshu Sharma, Ekavali Khanna	Drama	Peppermint Studios	
M A Y	20	Sarbjit	Omung Kumar	Aishwarya Rai, Randeep Hooda, Richa Chadha	Biopic	T-Series Films, Legend Studios	
M A Y	27	Phobia	Pawan Kripalani	Radhika Apte, Satyadeep Misra	Thriller/horror	Eros International, Next Gen Films	
M A Y	27	Veerappan	Ram Gopal Varma	Sandeep Bharadwaj, Lisa Ray, Sachiin Joshi, Usha Jadhav	Action/biopic	Viking Media & Entertainment	
M A Y	27	Fredrick	Rajesh Butalia	Prashant Narayanan, Avinash Dhyani	Action		
J U N	3	Housefull 3	Sajid-Farhad	Akshay Kumar, Abhishek Bachchan, Riteish Deshmukh, Jacqueline Fernandez, Lisa Haydon, Nargis Fakhri, Nikitin Dheer, Jackie Shroff	Comedy	Eros International, Nadiadwala Grandson Entertainment	
J U N	3	Project Marathwada	Prakash Patel, Bhavin Wadia	Om Puri, Dalip Tahil, Seema Biswas	Drama		
J U N	10	Do Lafzon Ki Kahani	Deepak Tijori	Randeep Hooda, Kajal Aggarwal	Romantic	Dhiraj Motion Pictures, Focus Motion Pictures, Deepak Tijori Films, Pen Studios	
J U N	10	Dhanak	Nagesh Kukunoor	Hetal Gadda, Krrish Chabbria, Vipin Sharma, Vibha Chibber, Vijay Maurya	Drama	Drishyam Films, Kukunoor Movies	
J U N	10	Te3n	Ribhu Dasgupta	Amitabh Bachchan, Vidya Balan, Nawazuddin Siddiqui	Thriller	Endemol Shine India, Reliance Entertainment, Blue Waters Motion Pictures, Cinemaa, Kross Pictures	
J U N	17	Udta Punjab	Abhishek Chaubey	Shahid Kapoor, Alia Bhatt, Kareena Kapoor Khan, Diljit Dosanjh	Crime/drama	Reliance Entertainment, Balaji Motion Pictures, Phantom Films	
J U N	24	Raman Raghav 2.0	Anurag Kashyap	Nawazuddin Siddiqui, Vicky Kaushal, Sobhita Dhulipala	Crime/thriller	Reliance Entertainment, Phantom Films	
J U N	24	Junooniyat	Vivek Agnihotri	Pulkit Samrat, Yami Gautam, Gulshan Devaiah, Hrishita Bhatt	Romance	T-Series Films	
J U N	24	7 Hours To Go	Saurabh Varma	Shiv Panditt, Sandeepa Dhar, Natasa Stankovic, Varun Badola	Crime/thriller	Krian Pictures, Saurabh Varma Pictures	
J U N	24	A Scandall	Ishaan Shrivedi	Reeth Mazumder, Manav Kaul, Tanvi Vyas	Adult		
J U N	24	Rough Book	Ananth Narayan Mahadevan	Amaan Khan, Tannishtha Chatterjee	Drama	Aerika Cineworks	

== July–September ==
Opening		Title	Director	Cast	Genre	Studio	Ref.
J U L	1	Shorgul	Pranav Kumar Singh, Jitendra Tiwari	Jimmy Sheirgill, Suha Gezen, Ashutosh Rana, Narendra Jha	Political drama	24 FPS Films	
J U L	1	Dil Toh Deewana Hai	Raja Bundela	Haider Khan, Sadha, Raj Babbar, Zeenat Aman, Sushmita Mukherjee, Alok Nath, Hemant Pandey	Comedy/romance	DSA Group	
J U L	6	Sultan	Ali Abbas Zafar	Salman Khan, Anushka Sharma, Randeep Hooda, Amit Sadh, Parikshit Sahni, Kumud Mishra	Sports/drama	Yash Raj Films	
J U L	6	Brahman Naman	Qaushiq Mukherjee	Shashank Arora, Sid Mallya, Denzil Smith, Biswa Kalyan Rath, Tanmay Dhananiya, Vaishwath Shankar	Comedy	Riley, Corniche Pictures, Oddjoint, Netflix	
J U L	15	Great Grand Masti	Indra Kumar	Vivek Oberoi, Riteish Deshmukh, Aftab Shivdasani, Urvashi Rautela, Shraddha Das, Mishti, Pooja Bose, Sonali Raut, Shreyas Talpade	Sex comedy/horror	ALT Entertainment, Sri Adhikari Brothers, Anand Pandit Motion Pictures, Maruti International	
J U L	22	Madaari	Nishikant Kamat	Irrfan Khan, Jimmy Sheirgill	Drama	Pooja Entertainment, Miraj Group, EaseMyTrip, Saptarishi Cinevision, Paramhans Creations, Dore Films	
J U L	22	Ishq Click	Anil Ballani	Adhyayan Suman, Sara Loren	Romance/drama	Algol Films	
J U L	22	M Cream	Agneya Singh	Imaad Shah, Ira Dubey, Raaghav Chanana	Road movie	Agniputra Films	
J U L	29	Dishoom	Rohit Dhawan	John Abraham, Varun Dhawan, Jacqueline Fernandez, Saqib Saleem, Ram Kapoor, Akshaye Khanna, Parineeti Chopra	Action	Eros International, Nadiadwala Grandson Entertainment	
J U L	29	Love Ke Funday	Indervesh Yogee	Shaleen Bhanot, Pooja Banerjee	Comedy		
J U L	29	Mission Tiger	Dipu Karunakaran	Vijay Raaz, T. R. Bijulal	Documentary		
A U G	5	The Legend of Michael Mishra	Manish Jha	Arshad Warsi, Aditi Rao Hydari, Boman Irani, Kayoze Irani	Romance/drama	Wave Cinemas, Eye Candy Films	
A U G	5	Fever	Rajeev Jhaveri	Rajeev Khandelwal, Gauahar Khan, Gemma Atkinson, Victor Banerjee, Caterina Murino, Ankita Makwana	Thriller	Niche Film Farm, Jaya Sapthagiris Productions, Indian Celebrity Management Entertainment, Plus Entertainment	
A U G	5	Hai Apna Dil Toh Awara	Monjoy Mukerji	Sahil Anand	Comedy/Romance		
A U G	5	Budhia Singh – Born to Run	Soumendra Padhi	Manoj Bajpayee, Mayur Patole	Sports	Viacom18 Motion Pictures, Code Red Films	
A U G	12	Mohenjo Daro	Ashutosh Gowariker	Hrithik Roshan, Pooja Hegde, Kabir Bedi, Arunoday Singh, Sharad Kelkar	Period drama	UTV Motion Pictures, Ashutosh Gowariker Productions	
A U G	12	Rustom	Tinu Suresh Desai	Akshay Kumar, Ileana D'Cruz, Esha Gupta, Arjan Bajwa	Romance/thriller	Zee Studios, KriArj Entertainment, Cape of Good Films, Plan C Studios	
A U G	19	Happy Bhag Jayegi	Mudassar Aziz	Abhay Deol, Diana Penty, Momal Sheikh, Ali Fazal, Jimmy Sheirgill	Comedy	Eros International, Colour Yellow Productions	
A U G	25	Waarrior Savitri	Param Gill	Niharica Raizada, Lucy Pinder, Rajat Barmecha	Action	Dr. Bob's Productions	
A U G	25	A Flying Jatt	Remo D'Souza	Tiger Shroff, Jacqueline Fernandez, Nathan Jones, Kay Kay Menon, Amrita Singh	Superhero/Action/comedy	Balaji Motion Pictures	
S E P	2	Akira	A.R. Murugadoss	Sonakshi Sinha, Konkona Sen Sharma, Raai Laxmi, Amit Sadh, Anurag Kashyap, Atul Kulkarni	Action/drama	Fox Star Studios, A.R. Murugadoss Productions	
S E P	2	Yea Toh Two Much Ho Gayaa	Anwer Khan	Arbaaz Khan, Jimmy Sheirgill, Pooja Chopra, Bruna Abdullah, Devansh Sharma	Action/drama		
S E P	2	Island City	Ruchika Oberoi	Tannishtha Chatterjee, Ashwin Mushran, Vinay Pathak, Amruta Subhash	Drama	NFDC	
S E P	9	Baar Baar Dekho	Nitya Mehra	Katrina Kaif, Sidharth Malhotra, Ram Kapoor, Taaha Shah, Sarika, Sayani Gupta	Drama/Romance	Eros International, Dharma Productions, Excel Entertainment	
S E P	9	Freaky Ali	Sohail Khan	Nawazuddin Siddiqui, Arbaaz Khan, Amy Jackson, Jas Arora, Seema Biswas, Nikitin Dheer, Asif Basra, Paresh Ganatra, Alam Khan	Comedy/sports	Sohail Khan Productionz	
S E P	9	Ek Kahani Julie Ki	Aziz Zee	Rakhi Sawant	Thriller	Chetna Entertainment	
S E P	16	Raaz: Reboot	Vikram Bhatt	Emraan Hashmi, Kriti Kharbanda, Gaurav Arora, Suzanna Mukherjee	Horror	T-Series Films, Vishesh Films	
S E P	16	Pink	Aniruddha Roy Chowdhury	Amitabh Bachchan, Taapsee Pannu, Kirti Kulhari, Andrea Tariang, Angad Bedi	Drama	Rashmi Sharma Films, Rising Sun Films	
S E P	23	Parched	Leena Yadav	Tannishtha Chatterjee, Radhika Apte, Surveen Chawla, Sayani Gupta	Drama	Seville International, Reliance Entertainment, Ajay Devgn FFilms, Shivalaya Entertainment, Blue Waters Motion Pictures, Airan Consultants, Ashlee Films, Marlylebone Entertainment	
S E P	23	Banjo	Ravi Jadhav	Riteish Deshmukh, Nargis Fakhri, Dharmesh Yelande	Comedy/drama	Eros International	
S E P	23	Days of Tafree	Krishnadev Yagnik	Yash Soni, Nimisha Mehta	Comedy	Anand Pandit Motion Pictures, Rashmi Sharma Films	
S E P	23	Wah Taj	Ajit Sinha	Shreyas Talpade, Manjari Phadnis, Hemant Pandey, Rajesh Sharma, Rajeev Verma	Satirical	Pen Studios, Pun Films, Spyderwave Films	
S E P	30	M.S. Dhoni: The Untold Story	Neeraj Pandey	Sushant Singh Rajput, Anupam Kher, Herry Tangri, Kiara Advani, Disha Patani, Bhumika Chawla	Biopic/sports	Fox Star Studios, Inspired Entertainment, Friday Filmworks	

== October–December ==
Opening		Title	Director	Cast	Genre	Studio	Ref.
O C T	7	Mirzya	Rakeysh Omprakash Mehra	Harshvardhan Kapoor, Saiyami Kher, Om Puri, Art Malik, K.K. Raina	Drama/romance	Cinestaan Film Company, ROMP Pictures	
O C T	7	MSG: The Warrior Lion Heart	Gurmeet Ram Rahim Singh, Honeypreet Insan	Gurmeet Ram Rahim Singh, Honeypreet Insan, Charapreet Insan, Kainaat Insan, Garima Insan, Rajesh Insan, Sukhottam Insan, Ashok Insan, Bhushan Insan	Adventure	Hakikat Entertainment	
O C T	7	Tutak Tutak Tutiya	A. L. Vijay	Prabhu Deva, Tamannaah, Sonu Sood	Supernatural comedy	Prabhu Deva Studios, Pooja Entertainment, Skakti Sagar Productions	
O C T	14	Anna	Shashank Udapurkar	Shashank Udapurkar, Tanishaa Mukerji, Govind Namdeo, Rajit Kapur, Sharat Saxena, Kishor Kadam	Biographical		
O C T	14	Motu Patlu: King of Kings	Suhas D. Kadavand	Saurav Chakraborty, Omi Sharma	Animation/comedy/adventure	Viacom18 Motion Pictures, Nickelodeon, Maya Digital Studios, Cosmos Maya	
O C T	14	Beiimaan Love	Rajeev Chaudhary	Sunny Leone, Rajneesh Duggal, Daniel Weber	Thriller		
O C T	14	Saat Uchakkey	Sanjeev Sharma	Manoj Bajpayee, Anupam Kher, Kay Kay Menon, Annu Kapoor, Vijay Raaz, Aditi Sharma	Comedy	Wave Cinemas, Crouching Tiger Motion Pictures, Friday Filmworks	
O C T	14	Fuddu	Sunil Subramani	Swati Kapoor, Monali A, Pawan Kumar Sharma, Anurag Basu	Drama		
O C T	14	Aakhir Kab Tak	Mithilesh Avinash	Manisha Singh, Vinay Rana	Social drama		
O C T	21	Final Cut of Director	Bharathiraja	Nana Patekar, Arjun Sarja, Kajal Aggarwal, Rukmini Vijayakumar	Thriller		
O C T	21	Love Day - Pyaar Ka Din	Sandeep Choudhary, Harish Kotian	Ajaz Khan, Sahil Anand, Harsh Nagar, Anant Mahadevan, Vaibhav Mathur, Shalu Singh, Amit Khanna, Devendra Chauhan	Comedy thriller		
O C T	21	Umrika	Prashant Nair	Prateik Babbar, Suraj Sharma, Tony Revolori, Adil Hussain, Nidhi Bisht	Drama	Drishyam Films	
O C T	21	31st October	Shivaji Lotan Patil	Vir Das, Soha Ali Khan	Drama/thriller		
O C T	21	My Father Iqbal	Suzad Iqbal Khan	Narendra Jha, Komal Thacker, Paresh Mehta			
O C T	28	Shivaay	Ajay Devgn	Ajay Devgn, Sayyeshaa, Erika Kaar, Ali Kazmi, Jabbz Farooqi, Vir Das, Bijou Thaangjam	Drama/action	Reliance Entertainment, Pen Studios, NH Studioz, Ajay Devgn FFilms	
O C T	28	Ae Dil Hai Mushkil	Karan Johar	Ranbir Kapoor, Aishwarya Rai, Anushka Sharma	Drama	Fox Star Studios, Dharma Productions	
N O V	11	Chaar Sahibzaade: Rise of Banda Singh Bahadur	Harry Baweja	Harman Baweja	Animation		
N O V	11	Dongri Ka Raja	Hadi Ali Abrar	Gashmeer Mahajani, Reecha Sinha, Ronit Roy, Sachin Suvarna, Ashmit Patel	Action/thriller		
N O V	11	Ishq Junoon	Sanjay Sharma	Rajbeer Singh, Akshay Rangshahi, Divya Singh, Raj Aryan	Romantic/erotic		
N O V	11	Rock On 2	Sujaat Saudagar	Farhan Akhtar, Arjun Rampal, Purab Kohli, Shraddha Kapoor, Prachi Desai, Shashank Arora, Shahana Goswami	Drama	Eros International, Excel Entertainment	
N O V	18	Tum Bin II	Anubhav Sinha	Neha Sharma, Aditya Seal, Aashim Gulati	Romance	T-Series Films, Benaras Mediaworks	
N O V	18	Force 2	Abhinay Deo	John Abraham, Sonakshi Sinha, Tahir Raj Bhasin	Action	Viacom 18 Motion Pictures, JA Entertainment, Cinema Capital Venture Fund, Sunshine Pictures	
N O V	25	Dear Zindagi	Gauri Shinde	Alia Bhatt, Shah Rukh Khan, Ira Dubey, Kunal Kapoor	Drama	Reliance Entertainment, Red Chillies Entertainment, Dharma Productions, Hope Productions	
N O V	25	Saansein	Rajiv S. Ruia	Rajneesh Duggal, Sonarika Bhadoria, Hiten Tejwani, Neetha Shetty, Sachi Ruia, Amir Dalvi, Vishal Malhotra	Romantic/horror	GPA Productions	
N O V	25	Moh Maya Money	Munish Bharadwaj	Ranvir Shorey, Neha Dhupia, Vidushi Mehra, Ashwat Bhatt	Crime drama	Delhi Talkies	
D E C	2	Kahaani 2: Durga Rani Singh	Sujoy Ghosh	Vidya Balan, Arjun Rampal, Jugal Hansraj	Thriller	Pen Studios, Boundscript	
D E C	9	Befikre	Aditya Chopra	Ranveer Singh, Vaani Kapoor	Romance	Yash Raj Films	
D E C	16	Wajah Tum Ho	Vishal Pandya	Sana Khan, Sharman Joshi, Gurmeet Choudhary, Rajneesh Duggal	Romance/drama	T-Series Films	
D E C	23	Dangal	Nitesh Tiwari	Aamir Khan, Sakshi Tanwar, Fatima Sana Shaikh, Sanya Malhotra, Zaira Wasim	Biopic	Walt Disney Pictures, UTV Motion Pictures, Aamir Khan Productions	

== See also ==
- List of Bollywood films of 2017
- List of Bollywood films of 2015
