= Kaadhal Enbadhu Podhu Udamai =

2023 Tamil film by Jayaprakash Radhakrishnan

- Theatrical release poster
- Directed by: Jayaprakash Radhakrishnan
- Written by: Jayaprakash Radhakrishnan
- Produced by: Jomon Jacob; Nithiyah Atputharajah; Dijo Augustine; Vishnu Rajan; Sajin S Raj; Jeo Baby (Presenter)
- Starring: Vineeth; Rohini; Lijomol Jose
- Cinematography: Sree Saravanan
- Edited by: Dani Charles
- Music by: Kannan Narayanan
- Production companies: Mankind Cinemas; Symmetry Cinemas; Nith's Productions
- Distributed by: Creative Entertainers and Distributors
- Release dates: 20 November 2023 (IFFI); 14 February 2025 (India)
- Running time: 1h 48m
- Country: India
- Language: Tamil

Kaadhal Enbadhu Podhu Udamai (transl. Love is a common possession) is a 2025 Indian Tamil-language drama film written and directed by Jayaprakash Radhakrishnan. The film stars Vineeth and Rohini in the lead roles alongside Lijomol Jose, Anusha Prabhu, Kalesh Ramanand, and Deepa in supporting roles.

Kaadhal Enbathu Podhu Udamai was screened at the 54th International Film Festival of India in the final week of November 2023. It was released in theatres on 14 February 2025.

== Plot ==
Lakshmi, a motivational speaker and documentary filmmaker, shares a close and liberal bond with her 25-year-old daughter Samyuktha, a lesbian kathak dancer. The story unfolds from multiple perspectives including Mary, who explores modern ideas of love and sexuality.

== Cast ==
- Vineeth as Devaraj
- Rohini as Lakshmi
- Lijomol Jose as Samyuktha
- Anusha Prabhu as Nandhini
- Kalesh Ramanand as Ravindra
- Deepa Shankar as Mary

== Production ==
On 16 February 2023, Jayaprakash Radhakrishnan who earlier directed Lens (2016), The Mosquito Philosophy (2019) and Thalaikoothal (2023) announced his next project titled Kaadhal Enbathu Podhu Udamai through a poster featuring Lijomol Jose and Anusha Prabhu, along with Vineeth, Rohini and Deepa in important roles. The film is presented by director Jeo Baby, and jointly produced by Jomon Jacob, Nithiyah Atputharajah, Dijo Augustine, Vishnu Rajan, and Sajin S Raj unver the Mankind Cinemas, Symmetry Cinemas and Nith's Productions banners. The technical team consists of cinematographer Sree Saravanan, editor Dani Charles and music composer Kannan Narayanan.

== Music ==
The soundtrack is composed by Kannan Narayanan. The first single "Theeyai" released on 7 February 2025.

Track listing
No.	Title	Lyrics	Singer(s)	Length
1.	"Theeyai"	Uma Devi	Uthara Unnikrishnan

== Release ==
=== Premiere ===
Kaadhal Enbathu Podhu Udamai was screened along with 24 other feature films at the 54th International Film Festival of India under Indian Panorama held in late November 2023 at Goa.

=== Theatrical ===
Kaadhal Enbathu Podhu Udamai was released in theatres on 14 February 2025 and distributed by G. Dhananjayan under Creative Entertainers and Distributors banner.

=== Home media ===
Kaadhal Enbathu Podhu Udamai began streaming on Sun NXT from 15 April 2025.

== Reception ==
Abhinav Subramanian of The Times of india rated three out of five and stated that "Kaadhal Enbathu Podhu Udamai keeps it real and relatable. Sometimes, that’s all a film needs to do." Jayabhuvaneshwari B of Cinema Express rated three point five out of five star and noted that "KEPU is replete with metaphors—be it the butterflies symbolising transformation and personal growth or a shot of the lead couple running freely so others like them can follow, shedding their masks along the way".
