= Jayaprakash Radhakrishnan =

Indian film director

- Born: Ezhuvanthala, Kerala, India
- Occupation: Film director
- Years active: 2016-present

Jayaprakash Radhakrishnan is an Indian film director and actor, who has worked on Tamil and Malayalam language films. He rose to fame through the thriller drama Lens (2016), and has gone on to make feature films including the family dramas The Mosquito Philosophy (2019) Thalaikoothal (2023). and Kaadhal Enbadhu Podhu Udamai(2025)

== Career ==
Jayaprakash Radhakrishnan worked as a software engineer, spending seven years in the United States, before returning to Chennai, hoping to work as an actor in Tamil films. His most notable acting roles came through Urumi (2011) and as Ajith Kumar's friend in Gautham Vasudev Menon's Yennai Arindhaal (2015).

Radhakrishnan made his directorial debut through the bilingual film Lens starring Anand Sami and Vinutha Lal in lead roles alongside himself. The film was widely released both in Malayalam and Tamil. The film opened to positive reviews, with Radhakrishnan winning the Gollapudi Srinivas National award for Best Debut Director.

Radhakrishnan next worked on The Mosquito Philosophy (2019), an experimental family drama film shot in Tamil, The Mosquito Philosophy (2019) produced by himself. The plot for the film emerged over drinks with Radhakrishnan's friend Suresh, who eventually played the protagonist. The scenes were shot sequentially, beginning with the drive to the nearest liquor store. Radhakrishnan revealed "with no script in hand, everyone responded spontaneously to the developing plot from the depth of their own experiences". His third film Thalaikoothal (2023), produced by YNOT Studios was based on the practice of the same name. Featuring established actors such as Samuthirakani and Kathir, it released in theatres to critical acclaim and is now streaming on Netflix.

His recent release Kadhal Enbadhu Podhu Udamai, a first LGBT-romantic drama in Tamil starring Lijomol Jose and Rohini in the lead roles released on Feb 14th 2025 to critical acclaim

== Filmography ==
Year	Film	Director	Actor	Language	Notes
2011	Urumi		Yes	Malayalam	
2015	Yennai Arindhaal		Yes	Tamil	
2016	Lens	Yes	Yes	Tamil/English	
2018	Vanjagar Ulagam		Yes	Tamil	
2019	The Mosquito Philosophy	Yes	Yes	Tamil	
2023	Thalaikoothal	Yes		Tamil	
2023	Harkara		Yes	Tamil	
2025	Kaadhal Enbadhu Podhu Udamai	Yes		Tamil	
