= Amitabha Singh =

Indian cinematographer

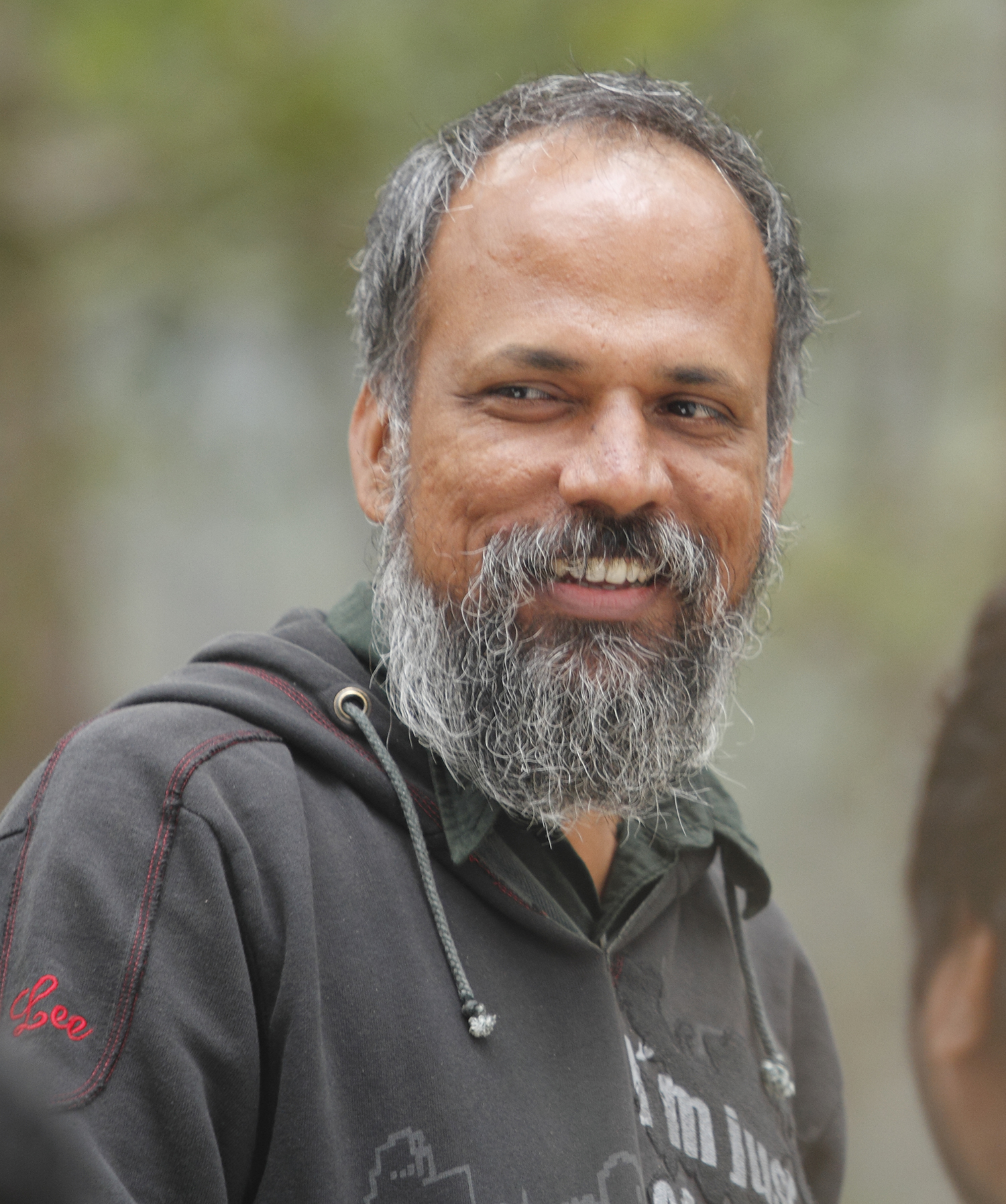
- Singh in 2014
- Occupations: Cinematographer; film producer; film director
- Years active: 1994–present

Amitabha Singh is an Indian cinematographer and producer known for the film Khosla Ka Ghosla and the award-winning Chillar Party, among others. The Good Road, a 2013 film he produced, fetched numerous accolades and was screened at various international film festivals. It was selected as India's official entry in the Best Foreign Language Film category at the 86th Academy Awards. It won the award for Best Gujarati film at the 60th National Film Awards. Singh started his career in 1994. In 2016, he launched the social enterprise Cinevidya,

== Early life and education ==
Raised in various cities across India, Amitabha Singh developed an interest in visual arts and media, influenced by the country's rich cinematic culture. Prior to pursuing filmmaking, he earned a degree in computer science at Delhi University, mathematics at Banaras Hindu University, and Japanese studies at Jawaharlal Nehru University in New Delhi, graduating in 1994. He went on to study at the Film and Television Institute of India in Pune.

== Career ==
Singh began filming television commercials in Mumbai in 1995. His breakthrough came with his cinematography for the 2006 satirical comedy Khosla Ka Ghosla!, directed by Dibakar Banerjee. He gained further acclaim for Chillar Party (2011), a children's film co-directed by Nitesh Tiwari and Vikas Bahl. In 2013, Singh served as both producer and cinematographer for The Good Road, a Gujarati-language drama directed by Gyan Correa, which was selected as India's official entry for the Best Foreign Language Film at the 86th Academy Awards and won Best Feature Film in Gujarati at the 60th National Film Awards. His directorial debut, Shortcut Safari (2016), an adventure film aimed at young audiences, emphasized environmental themes and was screened at the National Children's Film Festival.

Singh went on to work on the Amazon Prime series Panchayat (2020–present), the third season of which earned him a nomination for Best Cinematographer in a Series at the 2024 Filmfare OTT Awards.

Three of his projects have received National Film Awards.

=== Cinevidya ===
Singh founded Cinevidya in 2014 as a film education initiative aimed at introducing filmmaking and cinematic storytelling to children and young people. The organisation conducts multiday workshops covering script development, cinematography, production, and editing. Cinevidya also organises school-level film festival programmes under the CineMaestro banner, in collaboration with educational institutions.

In 2026, Singh authored the book Practical Filmmaking: A Hands-on Introduction to Filmmaking for Learners.

=== Documentary film ===
In 2024, Singh directed the short documentary film Reviving Roots for the UN Water Conference. It chronicles the life and philanthropic initiatives of Savji Bhai Dholakia, a diamond entrepreneur and social reform advocate.

In 2025, Singh's documentary film Simhastha Kumbh received a $5,000 Special Cash Grant in the Co-Production Market Documentary category at the WAVES Film Bazaar, presented by Netflix and filmmaker Sriram Raghavan.

His 2025 short film Khoya Paya focuses on the Hindu festival of Kumbh Mela.

== Selected filmography ==
As cinematographer

- Sau Jhooth Ek Sach (2005)
- The Film (2005)
- Khosla Ka Ghosla (2006)
- MP3: Mera Pehla Pehla Pyaar (2007)
- De Taali (2008)
- Thodi Life Thoda Magic (2008)
- Aagey Se Right (2009)
- Chillar Party (2011)
- Yeh Faasley (2011)
- The Good Road (2013)
- Panchayat (2020–present)

As producer

- Sau Jhooth Ek Sach (2005)
- Shortcut Safari (2016)

As director

- Shortcut Safari (2016)
