= Vijay Moolan =

Indian entrepreneur and film producer

- Born: Vijay Varghese Moolan; 8 December 1984 (age 41); Kochi, Kerala, India
- Education: Master of Business Administration
- Alma mater: Western Michigan University, USA, University of Wales, UK
- Occupations: Film producer; entrepreneur
- Years active: 2017–present
- Spouse: Kashmeera Vijay
- Children: 1
- Website: varghesemoolanpictures.com

Vijay Varghese Moolan is an Indian film producer and an entrepreneur. He is known for producing critically and commercially acclaimed movies Odu Raja Odu, Rocketry: The Nambi Effect under his banner Varghese Moolan Pictures. He's particularly notable for his role co-producing the later directed and co-produced by R. Madhavan winning several national and international accolades including the top honor at the 69th National Film Awards for the Best Feature Film in 2023.

== Early life and film career ==
Vijay Moolan was born into a business family in Cochin, Kerala. He pursued his education earning an undergraduate degree in mechanical engineering from the Western Michigan University, USA followed with an MBA from the University of Wales, UK. Despite spending a significant part of his life traveling between his hometown in Kerala, abroad, and the Gulf region, managing his family business, Moolan always harbored dreams of being involved in the film industry. These business and educational experiences provided him with a diverse set of skills and perspectives that would later serve him well in his career as a film producer. Moolan said, "I work for my dad and draw a monthly salary. I am very proud that it was the monthly salaries accumulated that helped me fund my first movie as I wanted to be a producer by around the age of 30".

== Filmography ==
Year	Film	Language
2018	Odu Raja Odu	Tamil
2022	Rocketry: The Nambi Effect	Tamil, English, Hindi
2026	G.D.N	Tamil

== Accolades ==
Rocketry: The Nambi Effect won several accolades and honors including being an official contender in the Best Film category at the 95th Academy Awards.

Film	Award	Date of the ceremony	Category	Recipients	Result
Rocketry: The Nambi Effect	68th Filmfare Awards	27 April 2023	Best Film (Critics)	R. Madhavan, Vijay Moolan	Nominated
Rocketry: The Nambi Effect	11th South Indian International Movie Awards	15–16 September 2023	Best Film	Tricolour Films, Varghese Moolan Pictures, 27th Entertainment	Nominated
Rocketry: The Nambi Effect	69th National Film Awards	17 October 2023	Best Feature Film	R. Madhavan, Vijay Moolan	Won
