= Harkara =

- Directed by: Ram Arun Castro
- Written by: Ram Arun Castro
- Produced by: Kalorful Beta Movement
- Starring: Ram Arun Castro; Kaali Venkat
- Cinematography: Philip R Sunder; Lokesh Elangovan
- Edited by: Dani Charles
- Music by: Ramshanker
- Production company: Kalorful Beta Movement
- Release date: 26 August 2023
- Country: India
- Language: Tamil

Harkara is 2023 Indian Tamil-language historical drama film directed by Ram Arun Castro and features himself in the title role and Kaali Venkat.

== Plot ==
The story revolves around the life of postman in a small village. A small conversation with a stranger on his way to deliver a letter changes the way he feels about the village and it's traditions.

== Cast ==
- Ram Arun Castro as Madheshwaran/Harkara
- Kaali Venkat as Kaali
- Gowthami Chowdhry
- Nicolas Fuster
- Jayaprakash Radhakrishnan as Kangani
- Pichaikaran Moorthy as Periyavar
- Balu Bose as Ganesan
- 'Kayal' Vijayalakshmi as Mariyamma

== Production ==
Production on the film began in 2014 under the title of Oattathoodhuvan and the directorship of Ra. Mu. Chidambaram, who revealed that the film would be based on Indian mail runners from the 1850s. Ram Arun Castro, an engineering graduate from BITS Pilani, made his acting debut through the film, following two years of acting training with the New York Film Academy. The film's original producer opted out of the film before the start of the production phase, prompting Castro to take over as the film's lead producer. The film was shot throughout 2015 in a village in the Theni district, with sets made to replicate the area in 1854. As the team sought distributors to help release the film, it was screened in the Chennai International Film Festival (CIFF), Kolkata International Film Festival (KIFF), and Bengaluru International Film Festival (BIFF) among other ceremonies.

In mid-2023, the film re-emerged again under the title of Harkara, with Ram Arun Castro revealed as the film's director. Castro had shot extra scenes for the film to include Kaali Venkat as a modern day postman, and prepared the film for release.

A day prior to the eventual release of the film in August 2023, Chidambaram sought a permanent ban on the film stating that he was not given the due credits in the film and that he and Ram Arun Castro had equal shares in the project. Chidambaram's counsel noted that Castro had added a couple of scenes in the film, renamed it to Harkara without permission, and then taken solo credit as the writer and director. The legal case was promptly adjudicated by the Madras High Court, leading to its swift dismissal. Chidambaram's contention, asserting that the film had been released with only minor alterations, faced a robust challenge from Ram Arun Castro, who presented compelling evidence demonstrating that the movie had been extensively reworked and subsequently received new censor certifications.

Given that certain scenes had already been featured in the Harkara which was earlier filmed under Chidambaram's direction, the court ruled in ensuring proper credits were attributed to him. However, all allegations of him were promptly dismissed. Consequently, the release of the movie was temporarily delayed by a single day due to the legal proceedings.

== Music ==
The music for the film was composed by Ramshanker.

Track listing
No.	Title	Lyrics	Singer(s)	Length
1.	"Ponniyamma"	R.Deepak Krishna	Pradeep Kumar; Sinduri Vishal	4:54
2.	"Kaali vs Gramam"	R.Deepak Krishna	Ramshanker S N Pavithraa	3:18
Total length:				8:13

== Reception ==
The film was released on 25 August 2023. Raghav Kumar of Kalki Online wrote that "This film is dedicated to the postmen who are the face of this postal department." Puthiya Thalaimurai critic gave two stars out of five and gave a mixed review. Virakesari critic rated three out of five and noted that "One can heartily appreciate the fact that the director has created the work on the principle of 'art for the people' without making any compromises, especially without imposing any commercial aspects." Jayabhuvaneshwari B of Cinema Express gave two point five out of five and noted that "All this said and done, Harkara does end with sweet surprises."
