= Sau Jhooth Ek Sach =

2005 Indian thriller film

- Official poster
- Directed by: Bappaditya Roy
- Written by: Pankaj Kapur
- Produced by: Amitabha Singh
- Starring: Mammootty; Vikram Gokhale
- Cinematography: Amitabha Singh
- Music by: Faizal Qureshi
- Release date: 16 September 2005
- Country: India
- Language: Hindi
- Budget: ₹50 lakh
- Box office: ₹1.8 lakh

Sau Jhooth Ek Sach (transl. A hundred lies, one truth) is a 2005 Hindi-language indie thriller film directed by Bappaditya Roy, the film marks Bappaditya Roy's directorial debut. Produced by Amitabha Singh through the production house Think 16. The film stars Mammootty and Vikram Gokhale. Gokhale plays an industrialist. The film was screened at the 7th Mumbai International Film Festival.

== Plot ==
The film follows Inspector Vivek as he inspects the case of a girl's suicide. He crosschecks members of industrialist Vikrant Pradhan's family. The next day, to Pradhan's family surprise, they realize that there is nobody named Vivek and that no girl died.

== Cast ==
- Mammootty as Inspector Vivek
- Vikram Gokhale as Vikrant Pradhan
- Lilette Dubey as Moushami Pradhan
- Joy Sengupta as Amabareesh Khanna
- Neha Dubey as Zoya Pradhan
- Kiran Janjani as Vikram Pradhan, Vikrant Pradhan's son
- Rita Joshi as Chawl woman
- Richa Nayyar as Sandhya Sawant
- Meghna Kothari as Anjali
- Tisca Chopra as Anjali
- Sonia Filinto as Anjali
- Shweta Gautam as Lakshmi

== Music ==
The music for the film was composed by Faizal Qureshi.

== Production ==
The film marks actor Mammootty's return to Hindi cinema.Mammootty said about his role that "Mine is a very difficult and challenging role; so very unlike a typical Hindi movie cop. In fact, it is completely non-action, and probably my best in the national language."

== Reception ==
=== Critical response ===
Taran Adarsh of Bollywood Hungama rated one out of five stars and wrote that "On the whole, SAU JHOOTH EK SACH - THE UNINVITED has something for the festival circuit, but nothing for the masses". A critic from Sify wrote that "Sau Jhooth Ek Sach' is a film about all of us". Film critic Subhash K. Jha wrote that "Debutant director Bappaditya Roy's morality tale is an arresting ensemble piece" and gave the film two stars out of five.

=== Box office ===
According to Box Office India, the film collected ₹25,000 on its first day, ₹75,000 on its first weekend, and ₹1 lakh in one week. Final worldwide gross was ₹1.8 lakh. It was made on a budget of ₹50 lakh. Box Office India called it a "disaster".
