= Saradhi =

- Official poster
- Directed by: Gopalan Manoj
- Written by: Rajesh K. Raman
- Produced by: Sreekumar Pillai
- Starring: Sunny Wayne; Vinutha Lal
- Cinematography: Noushad Shereef
- Edited by: Ayoob Khan
- Music by: Gopi Sundar
- Production company: Movies Nest Creations
- Release date: 13 February 2015
- Country: India
- Language: Malayalam

Saradhi is a 2015 Indian Malayalam-language action thriller directed by Gopalan Manoj and starring Sunny Wayne and Vinutha Lal. This film inspired the Tamil film Sei (2018).

== Plot ==
An ambulance driver receives an unexpected call to transport a deceased body and grieving family members to a distant location. As he embarks on the journey, he discovers that the situation is not as straightforward as it seems. Faced with a dilemma, he must make a decision - to flee or to confront the mysterious circumstances unfolding before him.

== Cast ==
- Sunny Wayne as Christy
- Vinutha Lal
- Nedumudi Venu
- Sreenivasan
- Madhupal
- Vishnu G Raghav

== Soundtrack ==
Music by Gopi Sunder. In a soundtrack album review, The Times of India stated that "Saaradhi is no extraordinary album but has its musical moments through the first two songs, and the album is worth grabbing".

- "Mazhamukile" - Najim Arshad, Mridula Warrier
- "Kuthu Kuthu" - Anuradha Sriram
- "Munne Munne" - Gopi Sunder.

== Reception ==
A critic from The Times of India opined that "Despite its inconsistent pace, Saradhi is watchable and can be quite gripping at times. Sunny Wayne as an ambulance driver transporting corpses pulls off an amazing performance in this crime thriller". A critic from Rediff.com wrote that "Saaradhi makes an effort to be different but ends up being a run-of-the-mill affair". A critic from Sify wrote that "The attempt is to present things in a serious way but what this thriller manages is to bore you to death".
