= Krishna Beuraa =

Indian playback singer

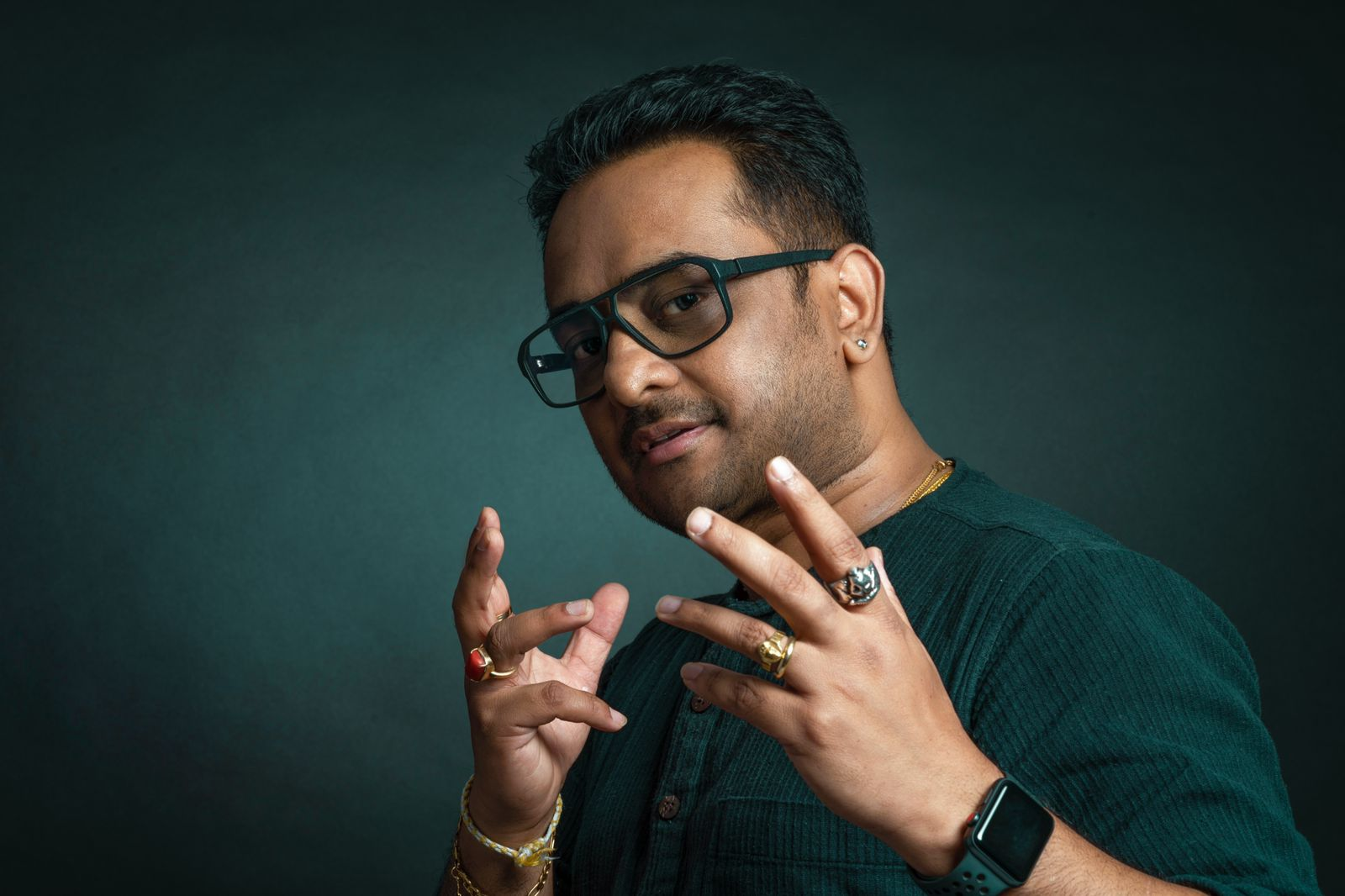

Background information
- Born: Cuttack
- Genre: Playback singer
- Occupation: Singer
- Years active: 2004–present
- Website: http://www.krishnabeura.com/

Krishna Beuraa is an Indian playback singer who has sung songs in commercial Hindi and multi language Indian regional cinemas and albums. Mostly known for his hit songs "Maula Mere" from the film Chak De India, "Main Jahan Rahoon" from the film Namastey London, "Rabba" (Musafir) and "Soniyo from the Heart" (Raaz-2). He can sing in 22 languages including his mother tongue Odia.

== Early life ==
Krishna Beuraa is originally from Kusupangi, Banki, Cuttack, presently residing in Mumbai. His father Indramani Beura was an employee of Indian Air Force who traveled to different parts of the country. He spent about 11 years in Chandigarh, graduated from GGDSD College, Sector 32, Chandigarh and post graduation from Department of Indian Theatre (Panjab University Chandigarh). His mother Shushama Beura wanted him to be a pilot or an engineer or a doctor.

== Career ==
Krishna Beuraa got his first break when he approached Sanjay Dutt. Sanjay not only liked his singing style but also gave him a chance to sing in four films: Rudraksh (song: "Ishq Khudai"), Rakht (song: "Sach Hai Sach Hai Yeh"), Musafir (song: "Rabba"), Deewaar (song: "Ali Ali").

From then on his journey as a singer began in Bollywood. Since then he has sung various hit songs including "Inteqam" from Shaadi Mein Zaroor Aana (2017), "Chaska" from Badmaash Company (2010), "Soniyo" (From the Heart) from Raaz - The Mystery Continues (2009).

In 2008 he also released his first solo pop album Ishq Gali Na Jaiyo composed of eight songs.

In 2010, Popular Indian rock band Bandish collaborated with him for their second self-titled album.

== Discography ==
=== Albums ===
- Ishq Gali Na Jaiyo (Label: TIPS)
- Neela Nayanaa (Label: Darubrahma Production)
- Tama Kathaa Mane Pade (Label: Sun Music)
- Babosa (Rajasthani Traditional Folk) (Label: KBtunes Music & Entertainment, Movement Creations LLP)
- Ishqiyaat Hindi Album (Label: FNP Media LLP) (Music Distributor: Movement Creations LLP)
- Aarati Hanuman Lala Ki (Producer: Praveer Singh) (Music Distributor: Movement Creations LLP)
- Teri Raah Tak Tak Ke (Producer: Narottam Sharma) (Music Distributor: OnClick Music, MOVIETONE DIGITAL ENTERTAINMENT PRIVATE LIMITED)

=== Hindi songs ===
Denotes films that have not yet been released

Year	Movie	Song
2026	Love Lottery	Bewafaa
2025	Baaghi 4	"Get Ready to Fight - Khauf Hai"
2017	Shaadi Mein Zaroor Aana	Mera Intkam Dekhegi
2016	Murari the Mad Gentleman	Udi Udi
2015	Ek Paheli Leela	Glamorous Ankhiyaan
2015	Kaun Kitne Paani Mein	Rangabati
2012	Agneepath	Shah Ka Rutba
2012	Hate Story	Dil Kanch Sa
2011	Luv Ka The End	The Mutton Song
2011	Yamla Pagla Deewana	Son Titariya
2011	Mere Brother Ki Dulhan	Mere Brother Ki Dulhan
2010	Hide and Seek	Kaise Jiyu Tere Din
2010	Badmaash Company	"Chaska"
2009	Raaz - The Mystery Continues	Soniyo From The Heart
2009	Raaz - The Mystery Continues	Bandaa Re Main To Tere
2009	Jugaad	Tu Hai Rab Mera
2009	Let's Dance	Koshish Koshish
2008	Jumbo	Jaya He Jaya He
2007	Namastey London	Main Jahaan Rahoon
2007	Chak De India	Maula Mere Le Le Meri Jaan
2007	Welcome	Insha Allaah
2007	Risk	Lakhon Karodo Mein Koyi
2006	Humko Deewana Kar Gaye	Mere Saath Chalte Chalte
2006	Humko Deewana Kar Gaye	For Your Eyes Only
2006	Zinda	Har Saans
2006	Zindaggi Rocks	Rabbi
2006	Jaan-E-Mann	Jaane Ke Jaane Na
2005	Aashiq Banaya Aapne	Aap Ki Kashish
2005	Deewane Huye Paagal	Aesi Umar Mein
2004	Rudraksh	Ishq Khudai
2004	Musafir	Rabba (Male Version)
2004	I Proud To Be An Indian	Khata Nahin
2004	Rakht	Sach Hai Sach Hai
2004	Rakht	Jannat Hai Yeh Zameen

=== Lollywood ===
Denotes films that have not yet been released

Year	Song	Movie	Notes
2014	Lutt Gaya	The System	
2019	Surkh Chandni (OST)	Surkh Chandni	ARY Digital (Pakistani) Drama

=== Regional films ===
Denotes films that have not yet been released

Year	Song	Movie	Language
2011	Maa Khoje Mamata (Title Track)	Maa Khoje Mamata	Odia
2011	Prema Aase Thare Jibana Re	Mu Premi Mu Pagala	Odia
2011	Samaya Ra Khela	Mu Premi Mu Pagala	Odia
2011	Mu Odia Pua	Kiese Dakuchhi Kouthi Mote	Odia
2011	Belara Darada	Tate Bhala Paauchhi Boli	Odia
2011	Bele Bele Jibanabi	Most Wanted	Odia
2009	Laage Ekaa Ekaa	Abhimanyu	Odia
2009	Mo Katha Suni Ja	Dream Girl	Odia
	Kuch Kuch Andide	Raaj the Showman	Kannada
2009	Rumu Brandy Whisky Ginnu	Housefull	Kannada
2011	Sariyeno	Mandahaasa	Kannada
	Katra Mila Samandar Mein	Waris Shah	Punjabi
2013	Yello bittu bandevu Naavu	Dyaavre	Kannada
	Raunkan Shaunkan	Sat Sri Akal	Punjabi
2018	Tere Darga Pe	Kabir	Bengali
2019	Vande Mataram	Panther: Hindustan Meri Jaan	Bengali
2025	Mo Bapa Maa Mo Charidham	Charidham - A Journey Within	Odia
2025	Mann Mohan	Laalo – Krishna Sada Sahaayate	Gujarati
2026	Tu Pherana	Bara Badhu	Bengali

== Awards and nominations ==
Year	Category	Song	Movie	Award	Results
2008	Best Playback Singer-Male	"Maula Mere"	Chak De India	Stardust Award	Won
