= Shortcut Safari =

Shortcut Safaari
- Directed by: Amitabha Singh
- Written by: Amitabha Singh; Svani Parekh
- Produced by: Amitabha Singh; Kashyap A Shah; Amigos Fin-o-tainment
- Starring: Jimmy Sheirgill; Aashi Rawal; Sharvil Patel; Mann Patel; Ugam Khetani; Stuti Dwivedi; Deah Tandon; Hardil Kanabar
- Cinematography: Mrinal Desai
- Edited by: Atanu Mukharjee
- Music by: Rohit Sharma; Samir-Mana
- Production companies: Xebec Films Pvt. Ltd.; Amigos Fin-o-tainment
- Distributed by: Rich Juniors Entertainment
- Release dates: 15 November 2014 (NCFF); 29 April 2016
- Running time: 101 minutes
- Country: India
- Language: Hindi

Shortcut Safaari (Hindi:शॉर्टकट सफ़ारी ) is a 2014 Hindi film directed by Amitabha Singh and featuring Bollywood actor Jimmy Sheirgill. The film was initially titled The Trip. Shortcut Safari had its festival premiere at The National Children’s Film Festival (NCFF) on 15 November 2014, established by the Children's Film Society of India (CFSI) in the capital, New Delhi.

Amitabha Singh's debut film, Shortcut Safari, was screened for the audience of Bengal at Nandan (Kolkata) on 24 December 2014. As part of the 4th Kolkata International Children's Film Festival, a special show of the film was organised by Shishu Kishore Academy, an institution under the aegis of the Information and Cultural Affairs Department, Government of West Bengal.

Shortcut Safari is a film in Hindi that revolves around the story of a group of urban children who get trapped in a dense forest during their school outing. It's a story of exploration and adventure through the experiences of these seven children over three days, who gain values in mutual respect, team-spirit and perseverance on the one hand; and the vital relevance of a clean environment with a balanced wildlife on the other.

== Cast ==
- Jimmy Sheirgill as Chief Jimmy
- Aashi Rawal as Tara
- Sharvil Patel as Rahul
- Mann Patel as Ankur
- Ugam Khetani as Sameer
- Stuti Dwivedi as Hiya
- Deah Tandon as Shinjini
- Hardil Kanabar as Krituporno

== Synopsis ==
Shortcut Safaari' is broad spectrum story that revolves around a group of urban, school-going children (between ages 10 to 14 years) who get stranded far away from their homes and families, and encounter two poachers, 'Kaju' and 'Katli' who are roaming the forest in hunt of a rare, clouded leopard 'Jimmy'. The children manage to subdue the poachers and hold them captive, leading to a bigger confusion as to the identity of the real 'Jimmy.'

== Festivals ==
Shortcut Safari is a film based on adventure and mystery. The festival screening was an event with Jimmy Shergill, Singh and the cast of the film present on the occasion. Actor Jimmy Shergill stated it was exciting to be part of the project that has a cause. Sheirgill plays a key role in Shortcut Safari that has been directed by Amitabha Singh.

== Music ==
Shortcut Safaari

Soundtrack album
- Released: 30 March 2016
- Genre: Feature film soundtrack
- Length: 15:11
- Language: Hindi
- Label: Junglee Music
- Producer: Xebec Films Pvt. Ltd.

The music album of Shortcut Safaari has 5 different kinds of tracks and offers variety for everyone. Shaan has sung 'Piggy Bank' composed by Samir-Mana. Sadhana Sargam and Atreyi Bhattacharya have lent their voices to ‘Ek Dhara Ke Jan Gan’ which has been composed by Rohit Sharma. ‘Bako Sufu’, ‘Zor Lagaa De’, ‘Dip Dip Dara’ are some of the other tracks. This adventure film traces the lives of a few school going kids who get lost in a dense forest during their outing. Junglee music (Powered by the Times Group) is the official music label of the movie.

No.	Title	Lyrics	Music	Singer(s)	Length
1.	"Bako Sufu"	Rohit Sharma	Rohit Sharma	Rohit Sharma	02.03
2.	"Ek Dhara Ke Jan Gan"	Rohit Sharma	Rohit Sharma	Sadhana Sargam, Atreyi Bhattacharya	05:24
3.	"Dip Dip Dara"	Ravinder Randhawa	Rohit Sharma	Rohit Sharma	04: 22
4.	"Zor Lagaa De"	Amitabha Singh	Samir-Mana	Jigraa	01:23
5.	"Piggy Bank"	Vijay Maurya	Samir-Mana	Shaan	02:19
