= Monsoon (2015 film) =

2015 film directed by Suzad Iqbal Khan

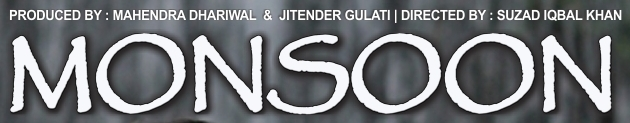
- Movie logo
- Directed by: Suzad Iqbal Khan
- Written by: Suzad Iqbal Khan
- Produced by: Mahendra Dhariwal
- Starring: Srishti Sharma; Sudhanshu; Shawar Ali
- Production company: Mango Movies
- Release date: 2015
- Country: India
- Language: Hindi

Monsoon is a 2015 Indian Bollywood romantic drama film produced by Mahendra Dhariwal and Jitender Gulati and directed by Suzad Iqbal Khan. The film stars Srishti Sharma, Sudhanshu, Shawar Ali, Vijay Singh and Raja Gulati. The film was given an A certificate, due to bold scenes. It was released on 20 February 2015. Although the film emerged as a box office disaster, it did well in the C centres where it was targeted. The story of the film is loosely based on an Italian romantic drama film Malèna.

== Plot ==
It is a story of coming of age of a teen, a 15 yr old boy falls in love with a 28 yr old married woman, whose husband (a forest officer) dies while he is on duty. The boy starts to lust for the girl, besides also developing a feeling of love for her. But the evils of the society don't want the girl to live respectfully. The film revolves around the dreams and fantasies of the teen and the way he protects the woman from the evil society.

== Cast ==
- Srishti Sharma
- Sudhanshu
- Shawar Ali
- Vijay Singh
- Raja Gulati

== Censor rating ==
The film went for censor formalities on 18 February 2015, and got an A certificate, due to its highly explicit sexual content, along with 13 cuts ordered in kisses, masturbation, cleavage exposures etc., by the Board.

== Box office ==
The film collected ₹ 1 crore 80 lakhs at the Indian box office.
