= G.D.N =

2026 Indian film by Krishnakumar Ramakumar

- Theatrical release poster
- Directed by: Krishnakumar Ramakumar
- Screenplay by: Krishnakumar Ramakumar; R. Madhavan
- Produced by: Varghese Moolan; Vijay Moolan; R. Madhavan; Sarita Birje
- Starring: R. Madhavan; Sathyaraj; Jayaram; Vinay Rai; Priyamani; Dushara Vijayan
- Cinematography: Aravind Kamalanathan
- Edited by: Bijith Bala
- Music by: Govind Vasantha
- Production companies: Tricolour Films; Varghese Moolan Pictures
- Distributed by: AGS Entertainment; Dharma Distribution
- Release date: 7 August 2026
- Running time: 147 minutes
- Country: India
- Language: Tamil

G.D.N is a 2026 Indian Tamil-language biographical film based on the life of inventor and engineer G. D. Naidu. It was directed by Krishnakumar Ramakumar, who co-wrote the screenplay along with R. Madhavan. Madhavan produced the film under his Tricolour Films production company in association with Varghese Moolan Pictures. It stars Madhavan in the titular role as Naidu, with Sathyaraj, Jayaram, Priyamani, Dushara Vijayan, and Vinay Rai in supporting roles. The film was released on 7 August 2026, received mixed reviews from critics and became a box office failure.

== Plot ==
The film begins in the later years of G. D. Naidu's life, set in the late 1950s, when he is locked in a battle with the Income Tax Department, which demands that Naidu pay exorbitant tax. The film later moves to flashback, which recounts Naidu's story from his teenage years. Naidu develops an interest in a motorcycle, which he came across for the first time when a British official drove one to his village. He later works odd jobs to save money and succeeds in buying it.

The story follows Naidu working in a cotton mill, and later trying to start one himself. He later starts the United Motor Service, which grows into one of the large private bus service operators during the era. It showcases his inventions like India's first indigenous electric motor, the "Rasant" electric razor, a cheaper five-valve radio, India's first petrol engine car, amongst others. His fight against the British Raj earlier, and the battle with tax authorities post-independence, forms the crux of the remaining story.

== Cast ==
- R. Madhavan as G. D. Naidu
  - Teejay Arunasalam as young G. D. Naidu
- Sathyaraj as Ramaiah Pillai
- Jayaram as Ambalapara Krishnan
- Priyamani as Chellammal
  - Sheela Rajkumar as young Chellammal
- Dushara Vijayan as Ranganayaki
- Aditi Balan as Padmavathi, Ambalapara Krishnan's daughter & Committee Member
  - Mantra Jane Moolan as young Padmavathi
- Vinay Rai as Bhupendra
- Nandhu as Achudhan, G. D. Naidu's accountant
- Vijay Yesudas as Periyar
- Aadukalam Naren as V. V. Giri
- Karunakaran as Perunkili
- Thambi Ramaiah as Ramaswamy Mama
- Kaniha as Lakshmi, Ambalapara Krishnan's wife
- Mohan Raman as Vice Chancellor
- Ramesh Thilak as Committee Member
- Vinodhini Vaidyanathan as Committee Member
- Shafna as Committee Member
- Richard Klein as Robert Stanes
- Carl A. Harte as Henry Adams
- Eddy Cheaib as Gottlieb Stoll
- Ved Maddison as Winston Smith
- Jenson Dhivakar as Vellaiyan
- Brigida Saga as Deivanai
- Muralidharan as Mohan
- Abdool Lee as Sundaram
- Chris Downer as Hurtis
- Sudarshan Gandhi
- Shilpa Sreekumar

Cameo appearances

- Denis Zheleznyiakon as Adolf Hitler
- John Vijay as M. R. Radha
- Krishnakumar Ramakumar as N. S. Krishnan
- Max Madhavan as Jawaharlal Nehru
- Varghese Moolan as C.N. Annadurai
- Aravind Kamalanathan as C.V. Raman

== Production ==
In April 2023, it was announced that Madhavan would star in a biopic of G. D. Naidu. Filming began in 2024 in an overseas location, and in India it began in February 2025. Filming wrapped that December.

== Release ==
=== Theatrical ===
The film was initially scheduled for theatrical release on 17 July 2026, but was postponed to avoid a box office clash with Jana Nayagan. It was eventually released on 7 August 2026. Dharma Productions distributed the film in Karnataka and North India.

=== Home media ===
The film began streaming on Netflix from 4 September 2026.

== Reception ==
G.D.N received mixed reviews from critics. Latha Srinivasan of NDTV gave the film 2.5/5, while praising the film's story line as being faithful to that of Naidu's life and Govind Vasantha's background score. She also praised the production for bringing the early 20th century to life and the performances of the main characters, while criticising the lack of emotional depth. Yashaswini Sri of The Indian Express similarly rated the film 2.5/5, praising the storyline, while criticising the narration of the story. Srinivasa Ramanujan of The Hindu appreciated the background score and the performance of the lead actors, while criticising the abrupt time transitions, undercooked emotional moments, and a rushed timeline.
