= Sei (film) =

2018 film directed by Raj Babu

- Theatrical release poster
- Directed by: Raj Babu
- Written by: Rajesh K Raman; Vignesh Raghavan (dialogues)
- Based on: Saradhi (2015)
- Produced by: Mannu; Umesh
- Starring: Nakkhul; Aanchal Munjal
- Cinematography: Vijay Ulaganath
- Edited by: Gopi Krishna
- Music by: NyX Lopez
- Production company: Trippy Turtle Productions
- Release date: 23 November 2018
- Running time: 126 minutes
- Country: India
- Language: Tamil

Sei (transl. Do) is a 2018 Indian Tamil-language action comedy film directed by Raj Babu. The film stars Nakkhul and Aanchal Munjal, while Nassar, Prakash Raj and Nithin Prasanna play supporting roles. Sei was released on 23 November 2018.

The film was loosely inspired from 2015 Malayalam film Saradhi.

== Plot ==
A fire starts at a recently renovated mental asylum, which was inaugurated by Health Minister Rajarathinam (Thalaivasal Vijay) to improve mental healthcare, burning 38 patients to their deaths. The investigations of a crime reporter named Deepak (Askar Ali) reveal that the fire was started by an organ trafficking mafia to cover up the fact that they had harvested the organs of the mentally handicapped patients, and he relays this information to Rajarathinam and his assistant Janaki (Anjali Rao). However, Rajarathinam and Deepak are killed by mafia members before they can reveal the heinous crimes and the institutional corruption that led to the mafia developing.

Meanwhile, Saravedi Saravanan (Nakkhul) is a failing actor who has to cheat women he pretends to fall in love with and cheat business owners in fake "sponsorship deals" to earn enough money to get by. He spends his time drinking and hanging out with his friends. Neena (Aanchal Munjal) is an aspiring screenwriter who is looking for a good script to write to get accepted by her film producer (Manobala). Neena and her friends hear about Saravanan, and when they follow him, they begin to see his misdeeds. Neena, however, finds Saravanan an interesting character, and feels that if she can change his behavior, that story would produce an interesting script that her producer would accept. She calls Saravanan, who is smitten by her despite only hearing her voice, and persuades him to try and get a real job.

When Saravanan's father has a heart attack and is unable to provide for the family, he realizes that he can drive his father's ambulance and thus earn money legitimately. He is asked to drive a mourning family, led by an old man (Nassar), and the dead body of what appears to be a family relative. However, it is revealed that the family is fake and that the mafia has actually paid the old man to dispose of the dead body in the forests, which turns out to be Deepak's. Saravanan manages to escape from the criminals with Deepak's body and the ambulance.

Neena, meanwhile, notices that two women at a shopping mall having fun were the same two women who had been "mourning" at the mortuary when she had followed Saravanan earlier. She realizes that something is wrong and makes contact with Saravanan. The latter, meanwhile has picked up a call from Deepak's cell phone - which also contains all the evidence regarding the mafia and its leader - from Janaki, who is also being chased by mafia members intent on killing her.

Connecting the dots, Neena and her friends rush to Janaki's aid and manage to save her and escort her somewhere safe. Janaki is grief-stricken to learn of Deepak's death via Saravanan calling them, and takes Neena and her friends to see Rajarathinam's wife (Meera Krishnan). All this time, Saravanan is evading the corrupt police and mafia members chasing him and his ambulance. Rajarathinam's wife informs them that she knows one honest, the strong police officer who will help them: ACP Suryanarayana (Prakash Raj).

Meanwhile, Saravanan ditches the ambulance and carries Deepak's body and cell phone. Stopping at a mosque, he gets a phone call from his father encouraging him that if he is doing something good, then he should do it without being scared of anyone or anything, even death. Praying at the mosque, he gets on a truck and departs with the body to where Suryanarayana is guiding him. Arriving at the location, he is ambushed by mafia members who had been tracking him. He fights them off defiantly but is saved in the nick of time by Suryanarayana and his police officers. Suryanarayana instructs Martin, a news reporter, to immediately transmit live the video evidence on Deepak's cell phone, which shows the truth that Rajarathinam's assistant Shiva (Nithin Prasanna) is actually the mastermind behind the whole trafficking organisation. Shiva arrives and attempts to fight Suryanarayana but is stopped by Saravanan and is eventually shot dead by Suryanarayana.

With the evidence out and Shiva dead, the organ trafficking mafia is dismantled. Suryanarayana, giving a press interview, explains how many Indians are in dire need of organs but only so few donate, and he encourages people to care for one another and sign up to be legal organ donors. He ends the interview by stating that the hero in this whole story of bringing down the mafia was not the police or government, but an ordinary citizen, who he leaves unnamed, showing the strength of the people if they decide to stand up to the injustices in society. Saravanan smiles at the interview that he is watching on TV with his friends, drinking tea.

== Cast ==
- Nakkhul as Saravedi Saravanan
- Aanchal Munjal as Neena
- Nassar as Old Man
- Prakash Raj as ACP Suryanarayana
- Nithin Prasanna as Shiva
- Thalaivasal Vijay as Minister Rajarathinam
- Meera Krishnan as Rajarathinam's wife
- Anjali Rao as Janaki
- Pasanga Sivakumar as Kumarasamy, Saravanan's father
- Rekha Suresh as Saravanan's mother
- Manobala as Film Producer
- Jayan Cherthala as Sudalaimani
- Chandrika Ravi as Nancy
- Annadurai Kannadasan as Murugesan
- Florent Pereira as Chief Minister
- Askar Ali as Deepak
- Billy Murali as James
- Meghna as Aarthi
- Mippu as Durai
- Venkat Renganathan

== Production ==
The film began production in April 2017 after a launch event held at Prasad Studios in Chennai. Nakkhul was revealed to be portraying an aspiring actor, while Hindi actress Aanchal Munjal was signed on to make her debut in Tamil films. It was directed by Malayalam film maker Raj Babu, and the cinematographer was Vijay Ulaganath. The movie is produced by Trippy Turtle Productions.

In June 2017, Nakkhul celebrated his birthday on the sets of the film.

== Soundtrack ==
The songs and background score are composed by NyX Lopez.

Sei

Soundtrack album by NyX Lopez
- Genre: Film soundtrack
- Length: 24:04
- Language: Tamil
- Label: TrendMusic

Track listing
No.	Title	Lyrics	Length
1.	"Nadigga Nadigga"	Shreya Ghoshal and Sonu Nigam	4:52
2.	"Nadigga Nadigga (unplugged)"	Shreya Ghoshal	4:23
3.	"Iraiva Iraiva"	Atif Ail and Saptaswara Rishu	3:53
4.	"Hero Hero"	Shankar Mahadevan and Chinnaponnu	4:47
5.	"Machane Machane"	Benny Dayal	4:23
6.	"Gangster Theme" (Instrumental)		2:42
Total length:			24:04

== Reception ==
S. Srivatsan of The Hindu stated, "Sei is an audacious attempt in writing a drama that goes nowhere". Thinkal Menon of The Times Of India gave 2 out of 5 and wrote, "Though the film has a not-so-bad premise, the narration turns unimpressive as the story progresses" and added, "Nakkhul as the over enthusiastic aspiring actor does justice to his character". S. Subhakeerthana of The Indian Express rated the film 0.5 out of 5 stars, she said, "Think twice before you catch this poorly-written and executed film in theaters" and criticized the "lousy" writing. Sify stated, "Sei is yet another average action entertainer which can be watched if you have no other option for entertainment".
