= Mandali (film) =

Indian Hindi drama film

- Theatrical release poster
- Directed by: Rakesh Chaturvedi Om
- Produced by: Prashant Kumar
- Starring: Purshottam Choubey; Aanchal Munjal; Rajniesh Duggall
- Release date: 27 October 2023
- Country: India
- Language: Hindi

Mandali is a 2023 Hindi drama film directed by Rakesh Chaturvedi and produced by Prashant Kumar Gupta, Geetika Gupta and Neetu Sabarwal of Reltic Pictures.

Abhishek Duhan stars as Purshottam Choubey, a devoted performer portraying Lord Laxman, with Aanchal Munjal as his love interest and Rajniesh Duggall as a manipulative politician. The ensemble cast includes Vineet Kumar, Kanwaljeet Singh, Alka Amin, Brijendra Kala, and others. Inspired by Munshi Premchand’s story Ramleela, the film depicts how traditional Ramleela performances in small towns are sometimes influenced by commercialization.

== Plot ==
Mandali follows the journey of Purshottam Chaubey, commonly known as Puru, a peon at an intermediate college in Mathura, Uttar Pradesh, who is passionately devoted to his role as Lord Laxman in his local Ramleela performance. The narrative centers on a traditional Ramlila mandali managed by his uncle, Ramsevak Chaubey. Puru's cousin, Sitaram Chaubey, plays the role of Lord Rama, and his involvement in the performance is marred by his indulgence in drugs, which leads to an abrupt halt during a key performance. This incident not only causes public humiliation but also triggers a personal and cultural crisis when Ramsevak abandons the art form, feeling that the sanctity of the sacred play has been compromised. Puru then embarks on a struggle to restore dignity to his family and the traditional Ramleela, reflecting on broader themes of honor, tradition, and the erosion of cultural values. The film is inspired by Munshi Premchand's story Ramleela and presents a critical examination of how sacred cultural performances can be exploited for financial gain through the incorporation of obscene elements.

== Cast and characters ==
- Abhishek Duhan as Purshottam Chaubey (Puru)
- Aanchal Munjal as Puru's love interest
- Rajneesh Duggal as a manipulative politician
- Brijendra Kala as Naushad Ansari
- Vineet Kumar as Ramsewak Choubey
- Bhasha Sumbli as Rashmi Choubey
- Kanwaljit Singh as Rajiv Narayan Singh
- Alka Amin as Kusum Choubey
- Ashwath Bhatt as Sitaram Choubey
- Saharsh Shukla as Ashish Shukla (as Saharsh Kumar Shukla)
- Neeraj Sood as Inspector Harisharan

== Reception ==
The film was released in October 2023 and was selected to compete for the ICFT-UNESCO Gandhi Medal at the 54th International Film Festival of India (IFFI) in Goa.

Manoj Vashisth of Dainik Jagran described it as "a film that shows the life of Ramlila artists, a heart-touching story with acting." Vishal Verma of CineBlues called it "simple, earnest, and effective." Akarsh Shukla of India.com described it as "value for money." Abhishek Srivastava of Times of India rated the film 3 out of 5 stars, stating that "it's a simple film that manages to bring a smile to your face after it concludes."
