= The Mosquito Philosophy =

- Film poster
- Directed by: Jayaprakash Radhakrishnan
- Written by: Jayaprakash Radhakrishnan
- Produced by: Jayaprakash Radhakrishnan; Jathin Sanker Raj; Rohit Gupta; Esha Tewari
- Starring: Suresh Kumar; Sindhu Jayaprakash; Jayaprakash Radhakrishnan; Pradeep Damodharan
- Cinematography: Jathin Sanker Raj
- Edited by: Dani Charles
- Music by: Ayyo Rama
- Production companies: Candle Light Productions; Glowing Tungsten
- Release date: 18 January 2019 (Dhaka International Film Festival)
- Running time: 70 minutes
- Country: India
- Language: Tamil

The Mosquito Philosophy is a 2019 Indian Tamil-language family drama film written and directed by Jayaprakash Radhakrishnan. The film stars Suresh Kumar, Sindhu Jayaprakash, Jayaprakash Radhakrishnan, and Pradeep Damodharan. The film was released on OTT platform Mubi.

== Plot ==
The protagonist, Suresh, springs a surprise on his friends by announcing that he is to be wedded, where in fact it is Suresh himself who is in for a surprise.

== Cast ==
- Suresh Somasundaram Kumar
- Jayaprakash Radhakrishnan
- Ravi Kathiresan
- Sindhu Jayaprakash
- Pradeep Damodharan
- Anusha Prabhu
- Siddanth Nair

== Production ==
=== Development ===
The plot for The Mosquito Philosophy was born over drinks with Jayaprakash Radhakrishnan's friend Suresh, who eventually played the protagonist. With just a plot in hand, the shoot was planned for next evening. Director's friends and family agreed to participate. The scenes were shot sequentially, beginning with the drive to the nearest liquor store. There were no retakes or rehearsals. With no script in hand, everyone responded spontaneously to the developing plot from the depth of their own experiences. Originally, actress Shruti Haasan was to produce and present the film under her banner Isidro Media.

"In the film a character talks about Mosquito Philosophy, so I decided to name it that way. This film is a minimalistic one, done with an idea of doing a film with bare necessities" - Jayaprakash Radhakrishnan.

=== Music ===
Music was produced by Ayyo Rama in Bangalore, India.

== Release ==
The film premiered at the 2019 Dhaka International Film Festival.

== Festivals ==
The film was an official selection for multiple festivals:

- Chennai International Film Festival 2021
- Independent film festival of Chennai
- 17th Dhaka International Film Festival (2019) – World Cinema, Bangladesh
- Nitte International Film Festival (2019) – India
- Habitat Film Festival (2019) – India

The film also had a special screening at the Cinemark Lincoln Square in Seattle.

=== Accolades ===
- Outstanding Achievement Award at the 2019 Cult Critics Movie Awards in India
- Honorable Mention at The Experimental Forum Film Festival (2019) in Los Angeles
- Best Story Award at the Lake City International Film Festival (2019)
