= Lens (film) =

2016 Indian film by Jayaprakash Radhakrishnan

- Poster in Tamil
- Directed by: Jayaprakash Radhakrishnan
- Written by: Jayaprakash Radhakrishnan
- Produced by: Jayaprakash Radhakrishnan; Vetrimaaran; Siddharth Vipin
- Starring: Anandsami; Jayaprakash Radakrishnan; Aswathy Lal; Misha Ghoshal
- Cinematography: S. R. Kathir
- Edited by: Gaugin; G. B. Venkatesh; Jainul Abdeen
- Music by: Score: Siddharth Vipin; Song: G. V. Prakash Kumar
- Production companies: Glowing Tungsten; Mini Studio
- Distributed by: LJ Films (Kerala); Grassroot Film Company
- Release dates: 17 June 2016 (Kerala); 12 May 2017
- Running time: 109 minutes
- Country: India
- Languages: Tamil; English

Lens is 2016 Indian drama thriller film written and directed by Jayaprakash Radhakrishnan. The film features dialogues predominately in Tamil and English. Dealing with the subject of voyeurism, it features Anandsami and Jayaprakash Radhakrishnan in the lead roles.

Lens has been screened in several film festivals including CLAM Festival Internacional Cinema Solidari, South Asian International Film Festival, Jagran Film Festival, Chennai International Film Festival, Pune International Film Festival, Bengaluru International Film Festival, Lonavala International Film Festival, and Bioscope International Film Festival. The film was distributed by LJ Films in Kerala and by producer Vetrimaaran under his company Grassroot Film Company.

The film was later released on Netflix.

== Plot ==
Aravind's growing estrangement with his wife, owing to his indulgence in virtual sexual relationships, paves way for his encounter with a stranger. This random experience takes a turn for the worse when the stranger requests Aravind to witness his suicide on a Skype call.

Lens

Soundtrack album by G.V.Prakash Kumar
- Released: 2017

G.V.Prakash Kumar chronology
Mupparimanam (2017)	Lens (2017)	Semma (2018)

== Cast ==
- Anandsami as Yohan
- Jayaprakash Radhakrishnan as Aravind
- Vinutha Lal as Angel
- Misha Ghoshal as Swathi
- Kulothungan Udayakumar as the Inspector in Munnar

== Soundtrack ==
All music is composed by G. V. Prakash Kumar.

Track listing
No.	Title	Lyrics	Singer(s)	Length
1.	"Moongil Nila"	Yugabharathi	Harini	4:46
Total length:				4:46

== Reception ==
Baradwaj Rangan wrote, "Lens is a refreshingly grown-up film...not only does it deal with a grown-up subject, it also refuses to infantilise the audience by treating its points as messages. Lens understands that a movie isn't a pharmacological product: pop one and cure a social ill. It lays out problems without the comfort of easy solutions."

== Awards ==
- Best Debut Director – 19th Gollapudi Srinivas National Award
- Best Screenplay – Lonavala International Film Festival
- Best Direction – Lonavala International Film Festival
- Best Screenplay – Bioscope Global Film Festival
- Best Director – 7th Jagaran Film Festival
