= Odu Raja Odu =

2018 film

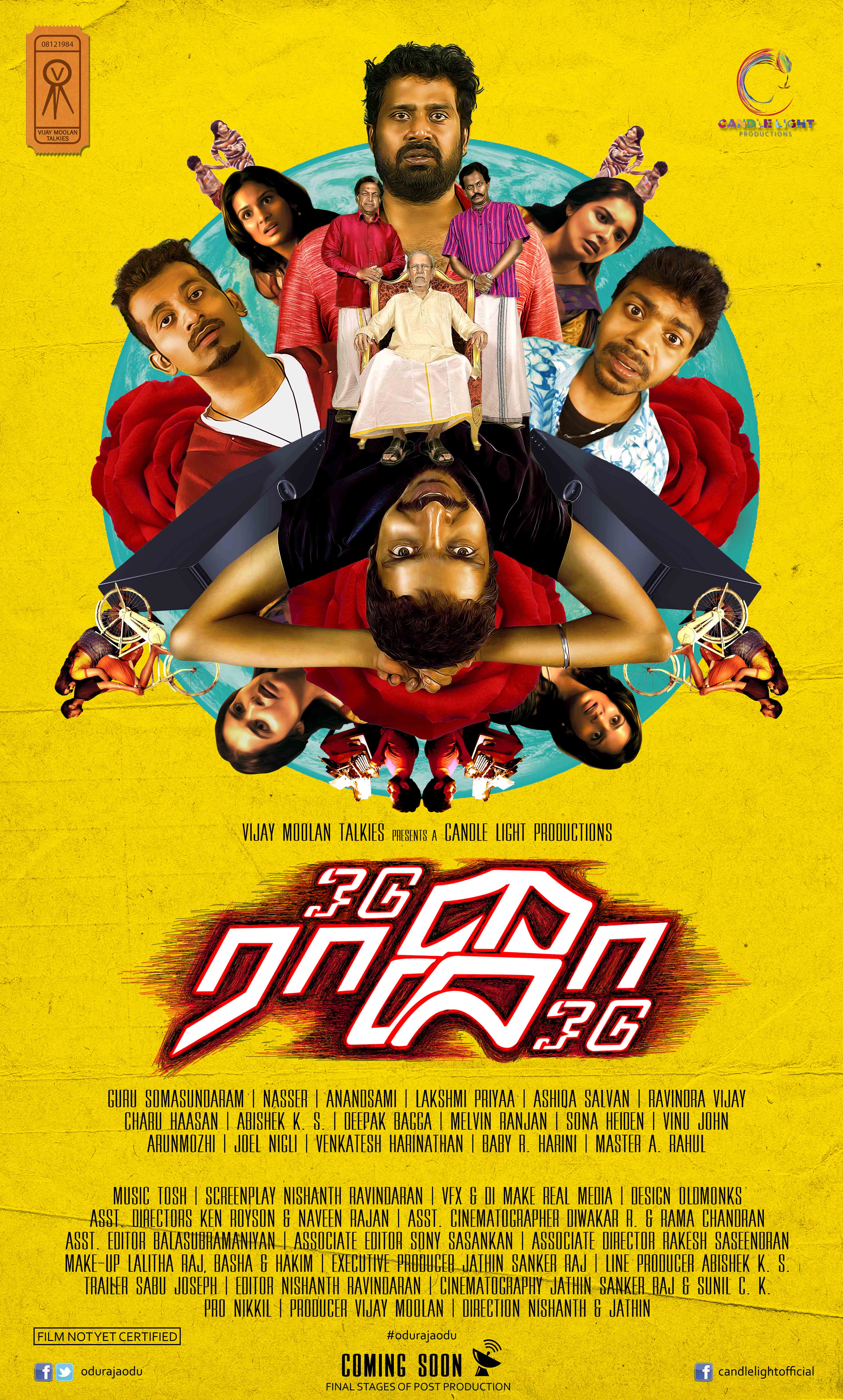
- poster of Odu Raja Odu
- Directed by: Nishanth Ravindaran; Jathin Sanker Raj
- Written by: Nishanth Ravindaran
- Produced by: Vijay V. Moolan
- Starring: Nassar; Guru Somasundaram; Abishek KS; Lakshmi Priyaa Chandramouli; Venkatesh Harinathan; Deepak Bagga; Charuhasan
- Cinematography: Sunil CK; Jathin Sanker Raj
- Edited by: Nishanth Ravindaran
- Music by: Tosh Nanda
- Production company: Candle Light Productions
- Distributed by: Vijay Moolan Talkies
- Release date: 17 August 2018
- Running time: 122 minutes
- Country: India
- Language: Tamil

Odu Raja Odu (transl. Run King Run) is a 2018 Indian Tamil-language black comedy film directed by duo Nishanth Ravindaran and Jathin Sanker Raj in their directorial debuts. Nishanth Ravindaran has also written the screenplay and handled editing. The film stars Guru Somasundaram alongside Lakshmi Priyaa Chandramouli, while Anandsami, Nassar, Charu Hassan, Power Star Srinivasan, Venkatesh Harinathan, and Sona Heiden play pivotal and supportive roles in the film. The film also marks the comeback of veteran actress Simran in a cameo role and also marks the acting debut of her, husband Deepak Bagga who played the antagonist role. The movie is produced and distributed by Vijay Moolan through his production company Vijay Moolan Talkies. The music is scored by debutant Tosh Nanda. The film had its theatrical release on 17 August 2018.

== Plot ==
Manohar is a jobless, struggling writer whose wife pressures him to get a set top box for her and he goes out with his friend who is a drug peddler, Peter, to fulfill her wish for their wedding anniversary. But to their misfortune, both Manohar and Peter are threatened by gangster Veerabadhran and his sidekick to close a deal for them. However things go awry for them as they land in a retired gangster Kali Muthu's place for help, but it only leads to another mishap.

== Cast ==
- Guru Somasundaram as Manohar
- Lakshmi Priyaa Chandramouli as Meera
- Anandsami as Nakul
- Nassar as Kali Muthu
- Ashiqa Salvan as Mary
- Deepak Bagga as Veerabhadran
- Sona Heiden as Mythilli
- Ravindra Vijay as Chella Muthu
- Abhishek K.S. as Imran
- Melvin M. Rajan as Gajapathy
- Venkatesh Harinathan as Peter
- Joel Nigli as Sundar
- Vinu John as Gunnie
- Harini R. as Malar
- Rahul J. as Sathya
- Simran as Kala Bhairavi (cameo appearance)
- Charuhasan as Peria Thevar (cameo appearance)
- Powerstar Srinivasan (cameo appearance)

== Production ==
Nishanth Ravindaran who primarily worked as post production supervisor in films including Vishwaroopam joined hands with cinematographer Jathin Sanker Raj for their maiden directorial venture with the film titled as Odu Raja Odu. The film was produced by Vijay Moolan under his production company Vijay Moolan Talkies and was co-produced by Rajendran EM and Varghese Moolan. Tosh Nanda who worked as a part of sound department in few Malayalam films was roped in as the music director for the film and also made his debut as a full-time music composer. The official trailer of the film was released on 5 August 2018.

The first look poster of the film was released by actor Madhavan on 23 September 2016.

== Music ==
The official Promo Song Bum Ha Rum was released by Vijay Sethupathi on his Facebook page on 4 March 2017.

Odu Raja Odu
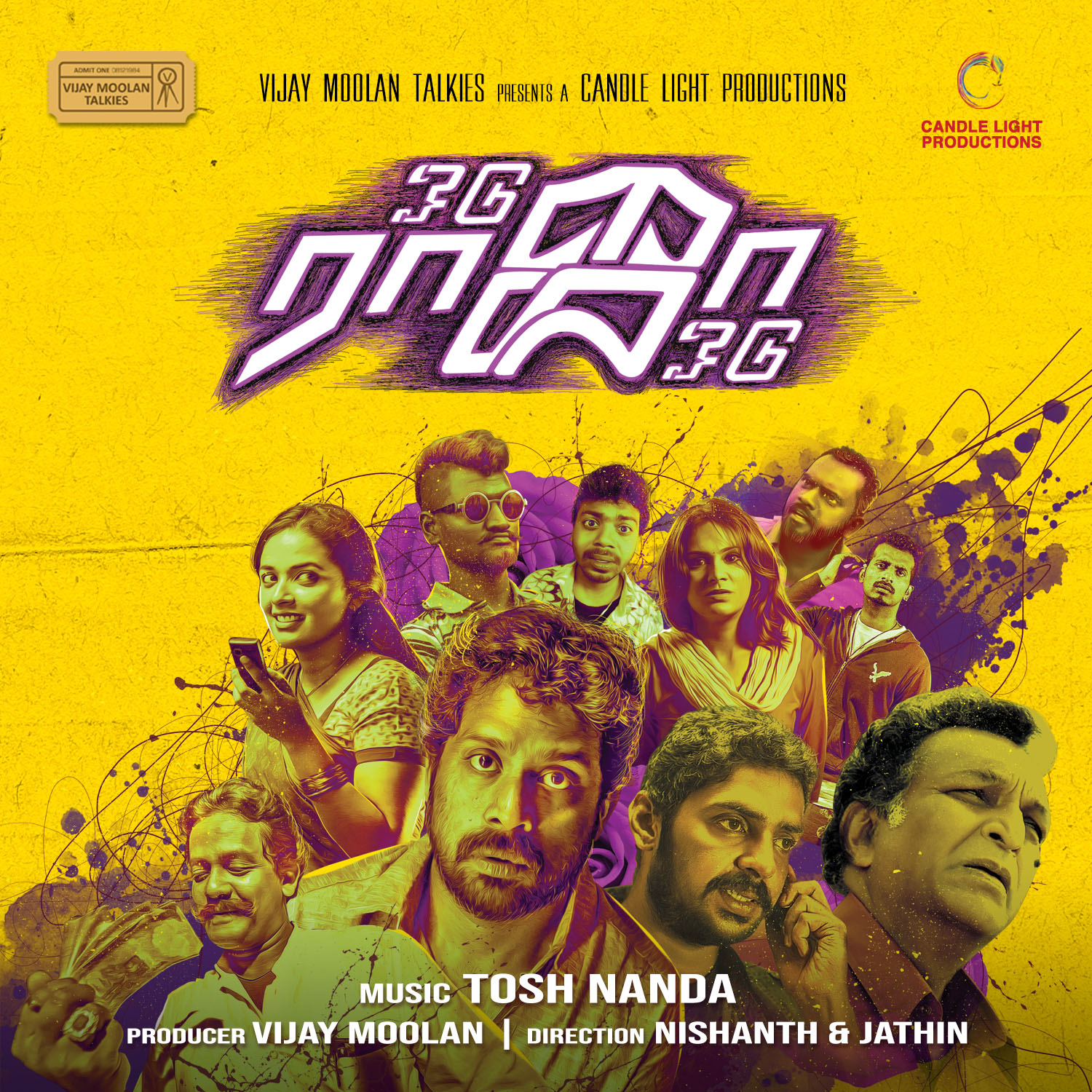

Soundtrack album by Tosh Nanda
- Released: 11 August 2018
- Recorded: Candle Light Productions
- Genre: Feature film soundtrack
- Length: 19:24
- Language: Tamil
- Label: Divo Music
- Producer: Vijay Moolan

Track List
No.	Title	Lyrics	Music	Singer(s)	Length
1.	"Bum Ha Rum"	Kavithran	Tosh Nanda	Karthik, Shwetha Mohan & Abishek	03:08
2.	"Life Ippo Gaali"	Ken Royson & Naveen Paul Rajan	Tosh Nanda	Aparna	03:21
3.	"Life Happy"	Kavithran	Tosh Nanda	Abishek	02:06
4.	"Thamaasu Thamaasu"	Parinaman	Tosh Nanda	Samana Raja	04:47
5.	"Kaarirule Kaarirule"	Swaminathan Dindigul	Tosh Nanda	Shaktisree Gopalan	02:47
6.	"Dickey Gone"	Ken Royson	Tosh Nanda	Aryan Dinesh, Ken Royson, Tosh Nanda	03:15
Total length:					19:24

== Release ==
The film had its theatrical release on 17 August 2018, clashing with another black comedy film Kolamavu Kokila which stars Nayanthara in the prominent role, at the box office. The film received mixed reviews from critics.
