= Children's Arena =

Coordinates: 17.720527°N 83.319318°E

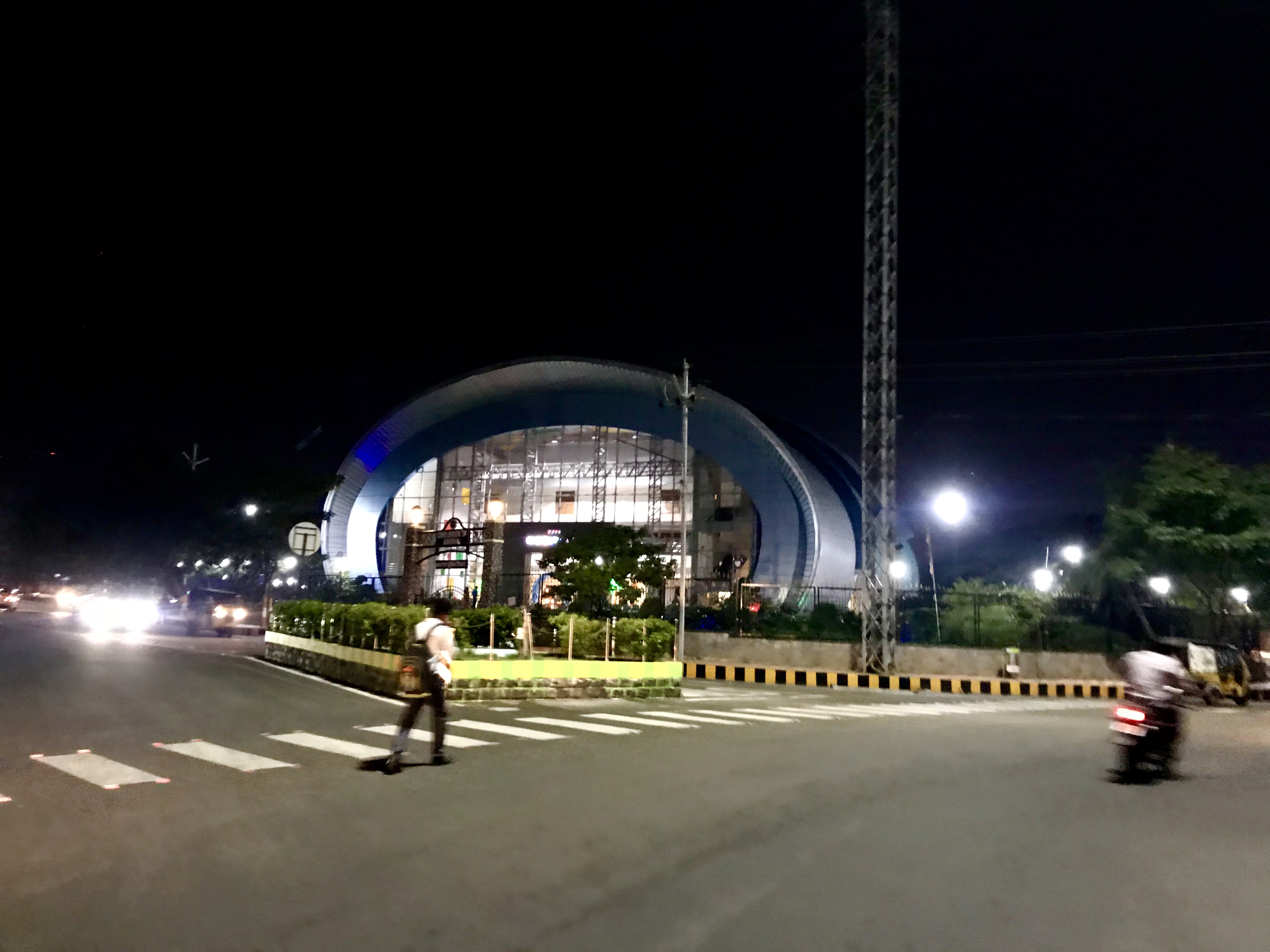
- VUDA Children Arena at Siripuram
- Interactive map of Children's Arena
- Former names: VUDA Children Theatre
- Location: Siripuram Junction; Siripuram; Visakhapatnam; India
- Owner: VMRDA
- Operator: GVMC
- Capacity: 1000

Construction
- Groundbreaking: 1993
- Opened: 14 November 1994
- Renovated: 2011
- Closed: 2012
- Reopened: 16 December 2016
- Cost: ₹220 million (US$2 million)

Website
- Venue Website

The Children's Arena is a children's world in Visakhapatnam, India and the only one of its type in Andhra Pradesh. It is located in Siripuram which is also known as the "heart of the city" It has a seating capacity of 1000 (600-Multipurpose Theatre + 400-Auditorium). The Auditorium is used to conduct various functions, such as birthday parties, music shows, school celebrations and cultural activities related to children. The multipurpose theatre is designed to showcase movies predominantly in English, Telugu and Hindi.

The arena was closed in 2011 and the demolition of old Dolphin shaped structure was carried out in 2012. The construction of the new oval-shaped arena took place in 2012 and was opened to the public in December 2017. A mini-zoo, library and play items are also available in the arena.

The then Chief Minister, N. Chandrababu Naidu, congratulated VUDA for coming up with a jewel in the crown of Visakhapatnam and hoped it would be a major venue for performance of traditional arts though some commercial activity could be allowed to pay for maintenance.

== Design and structure ==
The arena's design is unique for Children's activities such as of cultural events and seminars, workshops and conferences of national and international standard. The stage has been realigned in such a way that it is suitable for a variety of performances with advanced lighting and sound system and technical arrangements. The new structure has a cellar plus a ground floor to facilitate kids' activities and other regular programs.

The redesigned structure has a height of 70 feet with a built-up area of more than 4000 sq.m.

== Events ==
Indian Navy Day celebrations were held in this theatre, a band performance was scheduled on 14 November 2017 specially for children on the occasion of Children's Day.

Rashtriya Vayoshri Yojna was held on 29 October 2017 by the hands of Minister of State for Social Justice and Empowerment Krishan Pal Gurjar for the welfare of senior citizens and physically challenged.

National Children's Film Festival conducted by Children's Film Society of India (CFI) on 7 April 2017, was a three-day children's film festival that hosted 40,000 students with a concept of Little Directors.

Patriotic film festival was held on the event of 70th Independence day of India. Films like Chak De India, I am Kalam and Border were shown on this occasion.

The Vizag Tech Summit will take place on February 16–17, 2023.

== Transport ==
Children arena is located 2 km from the Dwaraka Bus station Complex. State run APSRTC bus services from various parts of the city.

== See also ==
- City Central Park
