= Mission Tiger =

- Directed by: Dipu Karunakaran
- Written by: Dipu Karunakaran
- Produced by: Saju Fortune; Leegesh S.L.
- Starring: Vijay Raaz, T R Bijulal
- Cinematography: Rajeev Vijay
- Edited by: Sobin K Soman
- Music by: Abu Murali
- Production company: Fortune Cinemas
- Distributed by: Mates Entertainment
- Release date: 29 July 2016
- Country: India
- Language: Hindi

Mission Tiger (2016) is an Indian adventure film directed by Dipu Karunakaran and jointly produced by Saju Fortune and Leegesh S.L.

== Overview ==
Mission Tiger is the first film featuring the root cause of tiger poaching in India and intends to impart a message- Save The Tiger.

The Film is based on the cause of 'Saving tigers'. Mates Entertainment is releasing the film on the International Tiger Day, 29 July.

Global Tiger Day, often called International Tiger Day, is an annual celebration to raise awareness for tiger conservation, held annually on 29 July. It was created in 2010 at the Saint Petersburg Tiger Summit. The goal of the day is to promote a global system for protecting the natural habitats of tigers and to raise public awareness and support for tiger conservation issues.

Recently, Actress Elli Avram, who shares her birthday with the occasion of International Tiger Day on 29 July, lent her support to the cause of saving tigers from cruelty, the prime theme of upcoming film 'Mission Tiger'.

'Mission Tiger' based on senior IFS official's story

Vijay Razz who has given many commercial movies, well known as comedy actor in the Indian film industry, did 'Mission Tiger' for free.

'Mission Tiger' makers urge government to declare film tax-free

The Public Relation, movie promotions is managed by 'Vinci Manchanda' under the umbrella of 'Show-Off Media'.

== Cast ==
- Vijay Raaz
- T.R. Bijulal IFS
