= Thalaikoothal (film) =

2023 Indian Tamil language film

- Theatrical release poster
- Directed by: Jayaprakash Radhakrishnan
- Produced by: S. Sashikanth; Chakravarthy Ramachandra
- Starring: Samuthirakani; Kathir
- Cinematography: Martin Donraj
- Edited by: Dani Charles
- Music by: Kannan Narayanan
- Production company: YNOT Studios
- Release date: 3 February 2023
- Country: India
- Language: Tamil

Thalaikoothal (transl. senicide), also see Thalaikoothal is a 2023 Indian Tamil-language neo-noir drama film directed by Jayaprakash Radhakrishnan and starring Samuthirakani, Kathir, Vasundhara Kashyap, Baby Vishrutha and Katha Nandi in the lead roles. It was released on 3 February 2023.

== Plot ==
Pazhani is a middle-aged man who lives with his wife Kalaiselvi and daughter and cares for his bedridden, comatose father Muthu. His father had suffered an accident at his workplace, where he works as a mason with Pazhani. To care for his father and attend to his needs, Pazhani stops his work and begins night shift work as an ATM security guard. Kalaiselvi is always angry with him and picks fights since she feels he neglects her and his family because he is always busy caring for his father. She must work at a matchstick factory due to Pazhani's low income to support herself and her family. She is irked by the factory supervisor's attempts to woo her at her workplace. Pazhani has borrowed a large sum of money from the local moneylender, a relative, to spend on Muthu's treatment. The moneylender keeps hassling him to get the money back and settle his debts. His father-in-law suggests performing thalaikoothal on the ailing father since he's been comatose for so long and is now a burden to the family, to which Pazhani strongly disagrees. He had been consulting a local demigod to find any cure or blessing for his father, and upon his advice, he agreed to arrange a feast for the whole village if his father's condition improved. One day, Muthu wakes up from his coma and starts recognizing the people around him. Pazhani is elated and borrows money from the moneylender again to arrange a feast for the whole village. He starts taking his father out to roam around and for frequent doctor visits. He also pledges his house documents secretly to the moneylender to meet the expenses.

The film progresses in a non-linear fashion with intermittent flashbacks from Muthu's youth, when he was in love with a lower caste washerwoman girl named Pechi. Despite the social pressure of those days, he gets close to her and decides to marry her. On the day of their marriage, Pazhani's grandfather attacks them and cuts off her finger before taking Muthu away forcefully. Muthu recalls this incident before losing consciousness again. One day, the moneylender turns up at their house and tries to measure the house before selling it to someone when Kalaiselvi interrupts them. Kalaiselvi realizes that he pledged the documents to the lender without informing her and argues with Pazhani, eventually leaving the house with their daughter.

His father-in-law and brother-in-law again meet Pazhani with the swami and inform him that Pazhani's brother-in-law took the documents back from the money lender after settling his outstanding amount. They start pressuring Pazhani to perform Thalaikoothal on his father since he has returned to a coma without hope for recovery. This time, Kalaiselvi threatens to leave him for good if he disagrees. Under immense pressure, Pazhani does not relent and lets them know he wants to care for his father without killing him. Kalaiselvi and her daughter leave his house, and he has nightmares that day about his daughter. Eventually, he and his in-laws gave Muthu an oil bath, made him drink coconut water, and put him to sleep on the floor overnight as per the standard procedure. However, Muthu remained alive the day following until he was killed by lethal injection. Pazhani arranged his funeral as if he had died naturally. Pechi also comes to see Muthu's funeral and goes back unnoticed. A devastated Pazhani takes some of his father's remains from the grave and plants a banyan tree using the remains. Pazhani and his family relocate to the city to pursue his work when his daughter confronts him inside the bus about the thalaikoothal incident, which she discovered from her friend. The movie closes years later with Pazhani and his daughter spending time together below the now-grown banyan tree.

== Cast ==
- Samuthirakani as Pazhani
- Kalaiselvan as Muthu
- Kathir as younger Muthu
- Vasundhara Kashyap as Kalaiselvi, Pazhani's wife
- Baby Vishrutha as Raji, Pazhani's daughter
- Katha Nandi as Pechi
- Vaiyapuri as a transgender demigod
- Aadukalam Murugadoss as Vemba, Pazhani's friend

== Production ==
Jayaprakash Radhakrishnan who earlier directed Lens began working on the project by early 2021, revealing that he had started a "village-based" film during an interview in March 2021. The film was officially announced in December 2021 by S. Sashikanth and Chakravarthy Ramachandra, under YNOT Studios, with Samuthirakani, Kathir and Vasundhara announced as the film's lead actors. The title, Thalaikoothal, refers to a ritual that is practised in rural areas of Virudhunagar district in Tamil Nadu. It is a form of traditional involuntary euthanasia done to the elderly. The film was largely shot in Kovilpatti, with some schedules held in Kutralam and Tenkasi.

== Release and reception ==
The film was released on 3 February 2023 across Tamil Nadu. Bhuvanesh Chandar from The Hindu wrote that the film was "simply outstanding", adding that "Jayaprakash’s poignant drama about a son’s fight to save his comatose father has brilliant performances, unbelievably great sound design, and stunning visual imagery that speaks of the value of a life". Logesh Balachandran of The Times of India also gave the film a positive review, noting "overall, Thalaikoothal is definitely a socially-relevant film and explores the practice of senicide in the most convincing way".
