= My Father Iqbal =

- My Father Iqbal
- Directed by: Suzad Iqbal Khan
- Written by: Sagar Nath jha; Abinash singh Chib
- Produced by: Paresh Mehta
- Starring: Narendra Jha; Komal Thacker; Paresh Mehta; Raj Sharma; Amit lekhwani
- Cinematography: Ananta Samadhan Gille
- Edited by: Honey Sethi
- Music by: Biswajit Bhattacharjee(Bibo); Varun Agarwal; Background score: Varun Agarwal: Krishna Bhardwaj; Abinash Singh Chib; Suzad Iqbal Khan
- Production company: Yash Corporation
- Release date: 21 October 2016
- Country: India
- Language: Hindi

My Father Iqbal is a 2016 Hindi movie directed by Suzad Iqbal Khan. The story focuses on Iqbal Khan, an employee at the Public Works Department. The Times of India said that the film "has its heart in the right place", but that it ultimately "misses the mark", giving it 2.5 out of four stars.

== Cast ==
- Narendra Jha as Iqbal Khan
- Komal Thacker as Sahiba
- Paresh Mehta as Sho Police J&K
- Raj Sharma as Xen Pwd
- Amit Lekhwani as Terrorist
- Sagar Nath Jha as Junior to Iqbal khan
- Sudam Aftab Khan as Son of Iqbal Khan
- Kumar Vaibhav as MLA

== Production ==
Produced under the banner of Yash Raj Films, the film features Narendra Jha, Komal Thakker, Paresh Mehta, Raj Sharma, Amit Lekhwani, Sagar Nath Jha and Sudam Aftab Khan. Produced by Paresh Mehta, Sagar Nath Jha and Abinash Singh Chib are the writers of the movie.
