= OK Mein Dhokhe =

- Theatrical release poster
- Directed by: Utpal S. Chaudhary
- Written by: Utpal S. Chaudhary
- Screenplay by: Ahmed Siddiqui
- Starring: See below
- Cinematography: Vishan Yadav
- Music by: Baba Jagirdar
- Production companies: Meow Music Company; Lotus Media & Films
- Distributed by: Meow Music Company; Lotus Media & Films
- Release date: 18 March 2016
- Country: India
- Language: Hindi

OK Mein Dhokhe (transl. Deceptions in deals) is a 2016 Indian Hindi-language drama thriller film, directed by Utpal S. Chaudhary, under the banners of Meow Music Company and Lotus Media & Films. The film was released on 18 March 2016.

== Cast ==
- Zoya Rathore (lead role)
- Sapan Krishna (lead role)
- Vaidhei Singh
- Megha Verma
- Ravi Thakur
- Milan Singh Rajput
- Saniya Chaudhary
- Natatasha
- Tabassum Saikh
- Raja Jani
- Ranjan Ji
- Chinni Chetan
- Vijay Raj Menom
