= Suzad Iqbal Khan =

Indian writer and film director

- Born: 06-02-1989; Jammu, India
- Occupations: director, producer, screenwriter
- Years active: 2014–present
- Parent(s): Mr Mohd Iqbal and Suraya bano

Suzad Iqbal Khan is an Indian writer and film director. He directed movies such as Monsoon, Madhubani, My Father Iqbal, Murari: The Mad Gentleman, Surgical-Strike, Khori..In Search Of and the music video "Rab Di Mehar".

== Early life ==
Suzad Iqbal Khan was born on 6 August 1989 in a hill station Banni district kathua to his parents Mohd Iqbal and Suraya Bano. He studied in army school Damana but for his interest in film making he moved to Mumbai on his 19th birthday in 2008 and started searching work in Bollywood as he assisted Ram Gopal Verma and Ramesh deo many other Directors and further in 2015 he did his Hindi debut film Monsoon and then more films like Murari the Mad Gentleman, My Father Iqbal which were released before 2016.

== Filmography ==
- Monsoon (2015)
- Murari the gentleman (2016)
- My Father Iqbal (2016)
- Rab Di Mehar (music Video) (2018)
- Surgical-strike (Film) (2019)
- Khori (In Search Of ?) (2019) (post-production)
- Majnoo (Punjabi) (2019) (post-production)
- Deep in the woods Death Warrant (web series) (2022)
- Ek Battey Do (Film) (2020)

Film	Credit	Genre	Year
Khori	Director	Thriller	2019
surgical-strike	Director	Action	2019
Rab Di Mehar	Director	Musice Video	2018
Murari The Mad Gentleman	Director	Comedy Drama	2016
My Father Iqbal	Director, writer		2016
Monsoon	Director,	Romantic	2015
Bihu Attack	Director,	Adventure	2026
