= Murari the Mad Gentleman =

- Directed by: Suzad Iqbal Khan
- Written by: Abinash Singh Chib; Sagar Nath Jha
- Produced by: Kishore N Patel; Sunil Patel; Jignesh Shah
- Starring: Asrani; Sanjay Singh; Nataliya Illina; Kiran Sharad
- Cinematography: Ananta Gille
- Edited by: Honey Sethi
- Music by: Biswajit Bhattacharjee (BIBO)
- Production companies: Deepa Krishna Production No. 1; Sunny World Wide Films
- Distributed by: Rich Juniors Entertainment
- Release date: 6 May 2016
- Country: India
- Language: Hindi

Murari the Mad Gentleman is an Indian Hindi-language comedy film directed by Suzad Iqbal Khan and starring Asrani, Sanjay Singh, Nataliya Illina, Kiran Sharad, and Surendra Rajan. The film was released on 6 May 2016.

== Cast ==
- Sanjay Singh as Murari
- Asrani as Mukhiya
- Natalya Llina as American girl Jenny
- Surendra Rajan as dadu
- Kiran Sharad as Mohini

== Music ==
Murari The Mad Gentleman

Soundtrack album
- Released: 12 February 2016
- Genre: Feature film soundtrack
- Language: Hindi
- Label: Red Ribbon
- Producer: Kishor N Patel, Sunil Patel and Jignesh Shah

Murari The Mad Gentleman has four tracks. The album includes five songs, the first song "Raabta" sung by Sonu Nigam is a soothing melody with sentimental lyrics, second song "Tera Deewana" is a romantic number with Hindi & English lyrics, third song "Shabbo" is an item number sung by Mamta Sharma, 4th and 5th song i.e. "Udi Udi" and "Udi Udi Duet" sung by Krishna Beura, Shahid Mallya & Khushboo Jain respectively are happy mood romantic songs. Music is beautifully Composed by Biswajit Bhattacharjee ‘Bibo’ and lyrics by Krishan Bhardwaj.

| No. | Title | Lyrics | Music | Singer(s) | Length |
|---|---|---|---|---|---|
| 1. | "Raabta" | Krishan Bhardwaj | Biswajit Bhattacharjee (BIBO) | Sonu Nigam |
| 2. | "Tera Deewana" | Krishan Bhardwaj | Biswajit Bhattacharjee (BIBO) | Biswajit Bhattacharjee, Shilpa Surroch |
| 3. | "Shabbo" | Krishan Bhardwaj | Biswajit Bhattacharjee (BIBO) | Mamta Sharma and Amit Gupta |
| 4. | "Udi Udi" | Krishan Bhardwaj | Biswajit Bhattacharjee (BIBO) | Krishna Beura |
| 5. | "Udi Udi (Duet)" | Krishan Bhardwaj | Biswajit Bhattacharjee (BIBO) | Shahid Mallya and Khushboo Jain |
