= Aanchal Munjal =

Indian actress

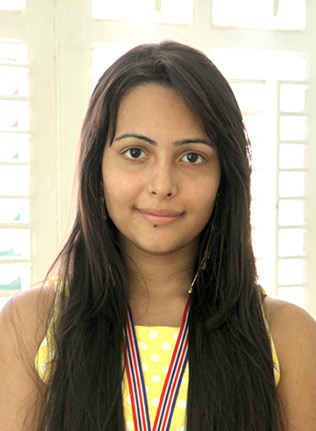
- Munjal in 2016
- Born: 17 April 1998 (age 28); Hisar, India
- Occupation: Actress
- Years active: 2006–present

Aanchal Munjal is an Indian film and television actress, acting in Hindi, Telugu, and Tamil films.

== Career ==
Munjal started acting as a child. Munjal's first television role was as Sameera in Dhoom Machaao Dhoom in 2008.

Her breakthrough performance was in 2010's We Are Family, based on the 1998 Hollywood film Stepmom. That same year, she appeared as Chunni in Ghost Bana Dost and Muniya S. Yadav in Hindi film Aarakshan. From 2011 until 2013, she played Raavi Ahuja in Parvarrish – Kuchh Khattee Kuchh Meethi.

She appeared in Bade Achhe Lagte Hain for the 2013 season.

== Filmography ==
=== Films ===
Year	Title	Role	Notes
2010	We Are Family	Aaliya	Debut film
2011	Aarakshan	Muniya S. Yadav	
2016	Ghayal Once Again	Anushka Mehra	
2018	Sei	Neena	Tamil film
2023	Mandali	Puru's love interest	
2024	Pushpa 2: The Rule	Hameed's girlfriend	Telugu film

=== Television ===
Year	Title	Role	Notes
2007	Dhoom Machao Dhoom	Sameera	
2009	Koi Aane Ko Hai	Niharika	
2010	Ghost Bana Dost	Chunni	
2011–13	Parvarrish – Kuchh Khattee Kuchh Meethi	Raavi Jeet Ahuja	
2012	Gumrah: End of Innocence	Anjali Dobriyal	
2013	Welcome – Baazi Mehmaan Nawazi Ki	Herself	
2013	Bade Achhe Lagte Hain	Pihu Ram Kapoor	
2014	Ek Boond Ishq	Radha Verma	
2017	Dil Buffering	Abby	
2023	Pret Boys	Eisha	Amazon Mini TV Series

=== Short film ===
Year	Title	Role	Notes
2025	Bhojpuri Star Mahua Singh Chale Hollywood	Riya	Released on YouTube

== Awards and nominations ==
- 2012 Indian Telly Awards for Indian Telly Award for Best Child Artiste - Female for Raavi Ahuja in Parvarrish – Kuchh Khattee Kuchh Meethi (Won)
- 2012 Indian Television Academy Awards for Most Promising Child Star as Anjali Dobrial in Gumrah: End of Innocence (Nominated)
