= Darling Don't Cheat =

- Directed by: Rajkumar Hindusthani
- Produced by: Rajkumar Hindusthani (Fyeo Media Works)
- Starring: Gaurav Pandey, Ashish Tyagi, Neha Chaterji, Raiya Sinha, Shivank Choudhary, Suneha Chaudhary, Sanntosh Kumar
- Production company: Fyeo Media Works
- Release date: 11 March 2016
- Country: India
- Language: Hindi

Darling Don't Cheat is a 2016 Indian Hindi-language thriller drama film directed by Rajkumar Hindusthani and produced by Hindusthani through Fyeo Media Works. The film was released on 11 March 2016. To promote the film, the studio organized a contest which would result in the winner receiving a trip to a nudist beach. There were over 100,000 contestants, with an estimated 30% comprising women. The film centers on an aspiring actress who becomes entwined with a kidnapper who forces women to strip for him.

== Cast ==
- Gaurav Pandey as Vikrant
- Ashish Tyagi as Randeep
- Neha Chaterji
- Raiya Sinha
- Shivank Choudhary
- Suneha Chaudhary
- Sanntosh Kumar
