= Anandsami =

Indian director

- Born: Chennai, India
- Occupation: Actor
- Years active: 2001–present

Anand Sami or Anandsami is an Indian film and stage actor who has worked on Tamil and Malayalam films. In films, Anandsami had a career breakthrough with appearances in Lens (2016) and Odu Raja Odu (2018).

== Career ==
In 2001, Anandsami was a part of the Indian Tamil remake of the Hindi television series Kyunki Saas Bhi Kabhi Bahu Thi. He appeared in ten episodes, and has since noted that being a part of the show prompted to become more professional with his approach to acting. After completing work on the series, Anandsami created a portfolio and attempted to become an actor in Tamil cinema. Finding chances hard to come by, he joined the Chennai-based theatre troupe Koothu-P-Pattarai in 2002, where he performed for eight years, before moving on to work with another group, Perch. Despite making small appearances in films and television during the 2000s, Anandsami was able to establish himself as a prominent theatre actor in the Chennai acting circuit.

Anandsami was also a part of the trio that performs Kira Kozhambu, a play based on writer Ki Rajanarayanan's folk tales. He acted in the play with Ravindra Vijay and Kalieaswari Srinivasan in Coimbatore, and reenacted the same play with Maya S. Krishnan reprising Srinivasan's part in Chennai. The play was based on Ki. Rajanarayanan's collection of short stories titled Nattuppura Kadhai Kalanjiyam with Anandsami reprising his role from the original play. A critic stated that "Actors Anand Sami, Maya S. Krishnan and Ravindra Vijay were in their elements with their seamless blend of art and entertainment".

Anandsami is also known for his solo play, Jannal and Seethaimark Seeyakkai Thool where he performs writer Sundara Ramaswamy's short shorties of the same name. He was also part of an ensemble cast of actors that performed The Water Station, directed by Sankar Venkateswaran of Theatre Roots and Wings at the Kyoto International Performing Arts Festival

In film, Anandsami's most notable role was in Jayaprakash Radhakrishnan's directorial debut Lens, a thriller about web voyeurism. He was also seen in the 2018 black comedy Odu Raja Odu. In 2021, Anandsami was seen in Amazon Prime's The Family Man portraying a Sri Lankan Tamil rebel fighter.

== Filmography ==
Films

Year	Film	Role	Language	Notes
2002	Run		Tamil	Uncredited role
2003	Parthiban Kanavu		Tamil	
2004	Varnajalam	Ashwin	Tamil	
2005	Oru Kalluriyin Kadhai	Guru	Tamil	
2008	Chakkara Viyugam		Tamil	
2009	Siva Manasula Sakthi	Sakthi's friend	Tamil	
2009	Passenger	Anali Shaji	Malayalam	
2016	Lens	Yohan	Tamil; English	
2018	Odu Raja Odu	Nakul	Tamil	
2019	Mayuran		Tamil	
2022	Kuthiraivaal	Koteeswaran	Tamil	
2024	Thangalaan	Kailasam	Tamil	
2024	Raghu Thatha	Ranganathan	Tamil	
2024	All We Imagine as Light	Drowned Man	Malayalam; Hindi; Marathi	

Television

Year	Film	Role	Language	Ref.
2001	Kelunga Mamiyare Neengalum Marumagal Than		Tamil	
2021	The Family Man	Selvarasan	Hindi	
2024	Brinda	Thakur	Telugu	
2024	Thalaivettiyaan Paalayam	Prabhu	Tamil	
