= National Children's Film Festival =

Annual film festival

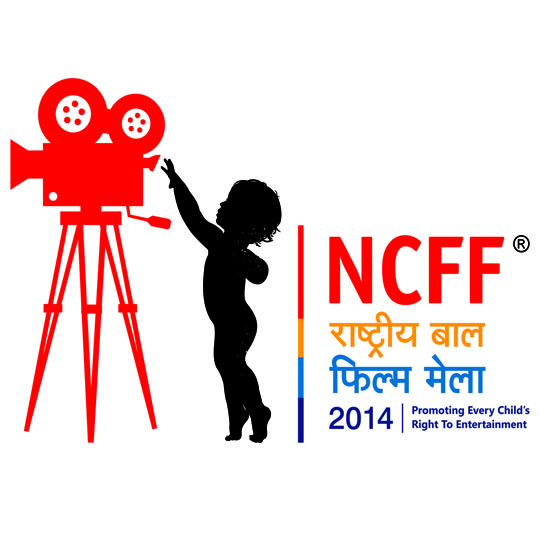
- National Children's Film Festival logo
- Opening film: Pappu Ki Pugdandi
- Location: Siri Fort Delhi, India
- Hosted by: Children's Film Society, India & Ministry of Information and Broadcasting
- Artistic director: Dr Shravan Kumar
- Festival date: 14–16 November 2014
- Website: www.cfsindia.org

The National Children's Film Festival (NCFF) was established by the Children's Film Society, India (CFSI) to expand the market for children's films and encourage talent in the country. The Children's Film Society announced the launch of the first National Children's Film Festival following the Prime Minister Narendra Modi's cleanliness drive announcement and, in keeping with the Minister's vision, the central theme of the festival was based on the Swachhta Abhiyaan.

== History ==
The National Children's Film Festival was first held in 2014 in Delhi. The second edition was held in 2016 in Jaipur, Rajasthan, with Make in India as its stated theme.

On 7 April 2017, a three-day event associated with the festival was held at the VUDA Children Arena in Visakhapatnam, Andhra Pradesh. The event was inaugurated by M. Venkaiah Naidu, who was serving as Union Minister for Information and Broadcasting at the time.
