= Vinutha Lal =

Indian film actress and model (born 1990)

- Born: Ashwathy Lal; Bengaluru, Karnataka, India
- Other names: Lakshana, Vinutha Singh
- Occupations: Actress, model, Cosmetologist
- Years active: 1996, 2008-2010, 2014-present

Vinutha Lal (born Aswathy Lal) is an Indian actress and model known for her works in Malayalam cinema. In 2014 she starred in Parankimala a remake of the 1981 Malayalam film of the same name, Vinutha has appeared in the mundu outfit donning the role of a woman named Thanka.

== Filmography ==
Year	Film	Role	Language	Notes	Ref(s)
1996	Appaji		Kannada	Special appearance	
2008	Nenjathai Killadhe	Suganthi	Tamil		
2008	Madurai Ponnu Chennai Paiyan		Tamil	Special appearance	
2009	Pramukhan	Aarathi	Malayalam		
2010	Thottupaar	Kanimozhi	Tamil		
2014	Parankimala	Thanka	Malayalam		
2014	Aggiravva		Telugu		
2014	Ulsaha Committee	Haritha Nair	Malayalam		
2014	Bhaiyya Bhaiyya	Shanthi	Malayalam		
2015	Saradhi	Rajani	Malayalam		
2016	Lens	Angel	Tamil; English		
2018	Chila Nerangalil Chilar		Malayalam		
2024	Thanne Vandi	Prema Shankaran	Tamil		
