= Vikram Singh (composer) =

Indian producer, director and composer (born 1983)

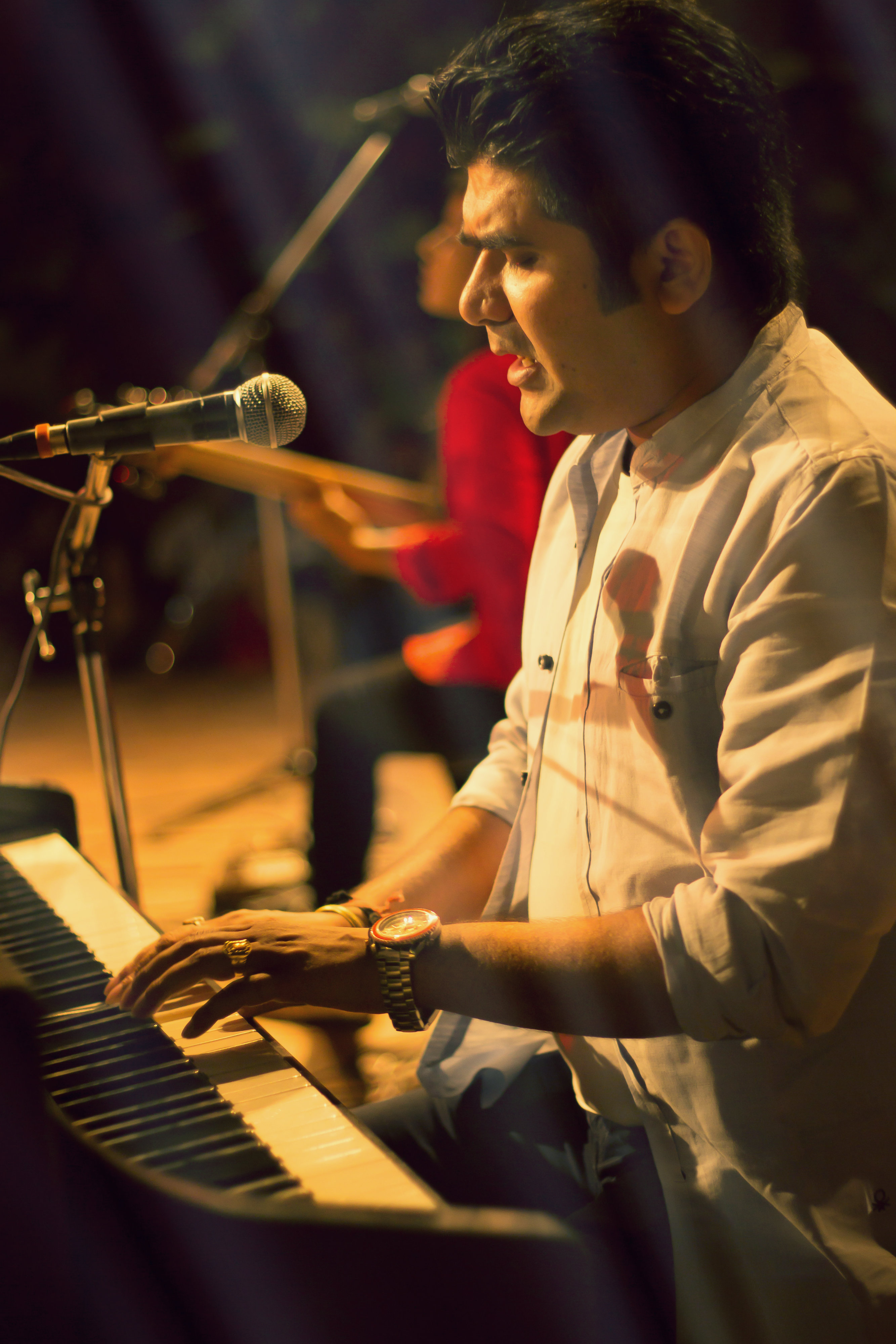
- Vikram Singh performing Saajna re "Music Concert – Jaipur 2014"

Background information
- Born: 23 April 1983 (age 43); Sirsa, Haryana, India
- Occupations: Producer, director, composer
- Years active: 2006–present
- Label: Virtual Planet Production
- Website: https://www.virtualplanet.in/

Vikram Singh (born 23 April 1983) is an Indian producer, director and composer. He works upon singles, films, TV commercials and radio jingles.

He is the brother of Gajendra Verma, singer of the viral song "Emptiness – Tune Mere Jaana" and other famous singles like "Ik Kahani", "Anjaam", "Mera Jahan," and the most famous 2018 hit, "Tera Ghata".

== Early life ==
Vikram Singh Verma was born in Sirsa, Haryana, India, to Dr. Surender Verma, a poet, writer, teacher and theater personality, and Chand Verma. Vikram's love for music and his father's able guidance worked wonders and at the age of three began his homeschooling for music. While still in school he started his vocal training under his guru Prof. Bakshi.

By the age of 15, he had completed his Visharad in music and started composing for school and college plays as well. He also performed at several state-level college competitions and won numerous awards for Best Harmonium Player, Best Vocalist, Best Keyboardist, by Kurukshetra University, Haryana.

After completing his graduation, along with his family he moved to Jaipur where he finished his master's degree in music from University of Rajasthan and did initial grades from Trinity College London, Board of the Trinity College of Music.

== Career ==
Earlier Vikram has worked as national sound designer for Indian FM radio channel 94.3 MyFm. He has produced more than 300 radio and TV jingles nationally and internationally.

He is best known for his work as director/composer/producer for his brother Gajendra Verma's hit singles like "Emptiness – Tune Mere Jaana" which was a viral song and got instant million of hits and downloads on the internet, "Phir Suna", "Saajna Re", "Tujse Door Jo Hota hu", "Tera Ghata" and many more. and Tera Hi Rahun.

As a music composer he has worked for Bollywood films and background scores and themes for Indian TV serials on Channel V, Sony, Zee TV, Starplus and DD National. In May 2013, as composer he collaborated with Indian rap artist Yo Yo Honey Singh for the song "Kudi Tu Butter" which went on to be a part of the Hindi feature film Bajatey Raho. In 2014–15 he composed music for Bollywood films like Chor Bazari and Guddu Ki Gun.

== Discography ==
=== Singles ===
Year	Song	Album	Singer	Role	Lyricist
2012	Tune Mere Jaana (Emptiness)	Tune Mere Jaana (Emptiness)	Gajendra Verma	Producer	Aseem Ahmed Abbasee
2012	Phir Suna	Tune Mere Jaana (Emptiness)	Gajendra Verma	Producer	Gajendra Verma
2012	Love kiya to darna kya	Tune Mere Jaana (Emptiness)	Gajendra Verma	Producer	Aseem Ahmed Abbasee
2012	Love kiya to darna kya (sad version)	Tune Mere Jaana (Emptiness)	Gajendra Verma	Producer	Aseem Ahmed Abbasee
2012	Sun Mere	Tune Mere Jaana (Emptiness)	Gajendra Verma	Producer	Aseem Ahmed Abbasee
2013	Kudi tu butter	Bajatey Raho	Yo Yo Honey Singh	Music composer	Aseem Ahmed Abbasee
2013	Kudi tu butter (Reprise)	Bajatey Raho	Gajendra Verma	Music composer	Aseem Ahmed Abbasee
2013	Tujhse door jo hota hun	"Hold My Hand" (single)	Gajendra Verma	Producer	Kumaar
2014	Saajna Re	Single	Gajendra Verma	Composer/director/producer	Aseem Ahmed Abbasee
2015	Anjaam	Single	Gajendra Vemra	Director/Producer	Aseem Ahmed Abbasee
2015	Maa Hai Yaar	Single	Gajendra Vemra	Producer/Composer	Aseem Ahmed Abbasee
2016	Tera Hi Rahun	From Lost to Found	Gajendra Verma	Director/Producer	Gajendra Verma
2017	Mera Jahan	From Lost to Found	Gajendra Verma	Director/Producer	Gajendra Verma
2018	Ik Kahani	From Lost to Found	Gajendra Verma	Director/Producer	Gajendra Verma
2018	Tera Ghata	From Lost to Found	Gajendra Verma	Director/Producer	Gajendra Verma
2019	Ja Ja Ja	From FLIP	Gajendra Verma	Director/Producer	Gajendra Verma

=== Movies ===
Year	Movie	Cinema
2012	Bhawri	Cinema of Rajasthan
2013	Taandav	Cinema of Rajasthan
2014	Thore	Cinema of Rajasthan
2014	Kans	Cinema of Rajasthan
2014	Bajatey Raho	Bollywood
2015	Chor Bazari	Bollywood
2015	Guddu Ki Gun	Bollywood

== Awards ==
- Winner "Golden Mike Award 2012-13" For Creative Radio Production.
- Winner "Golden Mike Award 2010-11" For Creative Radio Production.
- Excellency Award for Hero Cycle Jingle. (Aired in 8 Different Languages all over India.)
- Winner 1st Prize for "9th River To River Short film Festival- Italy". (Judged by Film Maker Azeez Mirza.)
- Winner 2nd Prize for "National Creative Ad Making Competition".(Judged by Ad Film Maker Prahalad Kakkar.)
- New-York International Radio Awards 2011.
