= Players (2012 film) =

2012 Indian film by Abbas-Mustan

- Theatrical release poster
- Directed by: Abbas–Mustan
- Written by: Screenplay: Rohit Jugraj; Sudip Sharma; Dialogues: Sudip Sharma
- Story by: Original Story: Troy Kennedy Martin; Adapted Story: Sourabh Ratnu; Nikhat Bhatty; Bhaskar Hazarika
- Based on: The Italian Job by Peter Collinson
- Produced by: Viacom18 Motion Pictures; Burmawala Bros.
- Starring: Vinod Khanna; Abhishek Bachchan; Bobby Deol; Sonam Kapoor Ahuja; Bipasha Basu; Neil Nitin Mukesh; Sikandar Kher; Omi Vaidya
- Cinematography: Ravi Yadav
- Edited by: Hussain A. Burmawala
- Music by: Songs: Pritam; Score: Sandeep Shirodkar
- Production companies: Viacom18 Motion Pictures; Burmawala Bros.
- Distributed by: Wave Cinemas
- Release date: 6 January 2012
- Running time: 163 minutes
- Country: India
- Language: Hindi
- Budget: ₹55 crore
- Box office: ₹45.52 crore

Players is a 2012 Indian Hindi-language action thriller film directed by the duo Abbas–Mustan and jointly produced by Viacom18 Motion Pictures and Burmawala Partners. The film features an ensemble cast of Vinod Khanna, Abhishek Bachchan, Bobby Deol, Sonam Kapoor, Bipasha Basu, Neil Nitin Mukesh, Sikandar Kher and Omi Vaidya, while Aftab Shivdasani appears in a cameo. The theatrical trailer premiered on 3 November 2011, and the film was released on 6 January 2012. It is an official remake of The Italian Job, and is the second remake of the 1969 British film after the 2003 American remake of the same name. Players employs the same plot as the 2003 version, while making the characters and incidents completely different.

The story follows a team of players, consisting of a don, a con-man, a lady thief, a seductress, a magician, an explosives expert, an expert hacker and a prosthetic makeup artist, who plan to steal gold worth ₹10,000 crore (US$1.1 billion) from a moving train. During the robbery they are double crossed by members of their own team.

Players was named one of the most anticipated Bollywood films of 2012, as it received hype ever since it was announced to be a remake of The Italian Job, was made on a huge budget, had a multi-star cast, was filmed in foreign locations as New Zealand, Russia and even the North Pole—which was a first for a Bollywood film— and was heavily promoted. Upon release the film received mixed reviews from critics. It opened to a poor response at the box office, despite having a wide release.

== Plot ==
Charlie's friend, Raj, is killed by the Russian mafia. At Raj's funeral, his wife Shaila hands Charlie a CD containing information about the transfer of gold ingots by train from Russia to Romania. Charlie decides to rob the train with the help of his mentor and conman, Victor Braganza. They hire a team of criminals to join them in the robbery, the group includes Spider, a world-class hacker, Riya Thapar a seductress and auto-mobile expert, Bilal Bashir, an explosives expert; Sunny, a prosthetic makeup artist; and Ronnie, a magician.

Before the heist, Victor's daughter Naina returns to India from Australia to receive Victor when he is released from prison. The group of players devises a plan to rob the Russian train in the sleaziest way possible. Spider hacks into a Russian satellite system, Riya seduces a high-ranking Russian officer so Charlie can impersonate him using a mask and wig provided by Sunny, and Ronnie creates an illusion to trick the soldiers guarding the gold while the rest of the team transfers the gold from the train. The robbery is executed successfully. Charlie calls Victor to inform him of the successful robbery, but Naina overhears the call and realises Victor broke a promise to her to never return to his life of crime.

While the players celebrate their success, Ronnie reveals to the team that he has a daughter who is hospitalised because she got paralysed during one of his magic performances and hopes to help her recover soon. Spider double-crosses the gang and explains that he got to know about the gold from Shaila before Charlie while seducing her, then tries to flee with all of the gold. Spider is stopped by Ronnie, who is then shot multiple times by Spider's assassins. The group is chased by the assassins as Ronnie and Riya are killed by Spider. Charlie, Bilal, and Sunny manage to escape after Spider blows up the location and flees with the gold. At the same time, Spider's assassins break into the house and murders Victor. Naina decides to cut off all contact with Charlie. Over the course of a year, Charlie contacts various gold dealers to learn which one has the stolen gold that Spider escaped with.

In New Zealand, the gang locates a dealer who is in contact with Spider. Charlie explains to Naina that the gang only wanted to steal the gold so they could help achieve Victor's dream of building a big orphanage. Naina understands and teams up with Charlie to exact revenge on Spider. In New Zealand, they discover that Riya is still alive and living there. She explains that she also wants revenge on Spider and provides the gang with the information about Spider's residence. Unaware of her plans, Spider flirts with Naina and takes her to his villa. Spider finds a hidden camera in Naina's dress and realises that she is working with Charlie, who breaks into Spider's mansion in an armored truck to rescue her and tells Spider that he will steal all of the gold within 48 hours. Spider tries to move the gold to another country, but the gang, using three large trucks and hacking into the traffic system, takes the gold and hides it inside three Mini Coopers. Just as they are about to leave New Zealand, they are caught by Spider and discover that Riya was working with Spider all along.

Spider tries to force the gang to hand over the gold, but the trunks of the Mini Coopers are empty. Spider betrays Riya and threatens to kill her. Before Charlie can reveal the real location of the gold, Riya shoots herself, and Spider stabs Charlie. Spider tries to escape, but Sunny and Bilal stop him and beat him up badly. Naina, who wants revenge for the death of Victor, shoots Spider three times. It is then revealed that the real Mini Coopers containing the gold are elsewhere. As the four leave the scene, Spider makes a final call to the Russian mafia and tells them that Charlie has stolen Russian gold. The gang takes the real Mini Coopers and leaves for India, but the Mafia stops them to check the cars, and once again, they are found to be empty. It is then revealed that the Mini Coopers were made out of the actual gold itself. In the end, Bilal opens a car dealership business, Sunny becomes a theatre actor, Charlie and Naina open Victor's dream orphanage, and Charlie raises Ronnie's daughter as his own.

== Cast ==
- Vinod Khanna as Victor Braganza, Naina's father and Charlie's mentor.
- Abhishek Bachchan as Charlie Mascrenhas, the team leader.
- Bobby Deol as Ronnie Grewal, an illusionist and magician.
- Bipasha Basu as Riya Thapar.
- Sonam Kapoor as Naina Braganza, Victor's daughter.
- Neil Nitin Mukesh as Spider, a skilled hacker who betrayed Charlie and his team, Victor and Ronnie's killer and the main antagonist. (Aa Dekhen Zara - 2009)
- Sikandar Kher as Bilal Basheer, an explosives expert who is deaf in one ear.
- Omi Vaidya as Sunny Mehra, a makeup artist and wannabe actor.
- Johnny Lever as MC / Mangal Chopra and BC / Budh Chopra, a mechanic who aids the team with their vehicles.
- Vyacheslav Razbegaev as General
- Sumit Sarkar as Commissioner of Police
- Aftab Shivdasani as Raj Malhotra, Charlie's friend. (special appearance)
- Shweta Bhardwaj as Shaila, Raj's wife. (special appearance)
- Jo Holley as Head Cop

== Production ==
=== Development ===
Development on the project began in late 2009, when Viacom 18 approached Abbas–Mustan with the idea of remaking The Italian Job into a desi Indian version, and bought the remake rights from the original producers Paramount Pictures. At first, Abbas–Mustan were hesitant, but after watching the 2003 remake of The Italian Job, they decided it would be a good idea to Indianise it. They spent around a year working on the script and making a few tweaks including two new characters, played by Basu and Deol.

=== Casting ===
Abhishek Bachchan was the first actor to be signed, along with Katrina Kaif and Neil Nitin Mukesh, to play the roles originally played by Mark Wahlberg, Charlize Theron and Edward Norton in the 2003 American remake. Mukesh was approached for the negative role, as the directors were impressed by his performance in Johnny Gaddaar (2007). Rumours circulated of different names being linked and approached including Sonakshi Sinha, who opted out due to date problems, to Anushka Sharma supposedly being called in to replace her. Kareena Kapoor and Priyanka Chopra had also been approached to play the leading female roles opposite Kunal Kapoor and Akshaye Khanna. Khanna later claimed he was never approached and expressed disappointment in not being cast. Kapoor left the film out due to her family problems with the Bachchan's. Deepika Padukone was also backed out, as she just like Chopra felt "the female lead does not have a strong part to play". Chopra was eventually dropped in a controversial matter, citing differences with Bachchan and the directors. Later Abbas Mustan claimed that the film was never offered to Chopra.

At one point the film had no three male leads and no female lead, which caused the directors to panic, after Kaif also backed out due to date problems. As the directors wanted a younger girl she was eventually replaced by Sonam Kapoor. Kapoor walked out of the film, as the director she was working with on another film, Mausam, asked to concentrate solely on his film. However, she was signed again, as she managed to a lot dates, but due to heavy pressure from both projects, she passed out on the sets of Mausam.

Rumours circulated that Mukesh had been dropped, due to the poor commercial business of his Lafangey Parindey (2010), although it had been a profitable venture. He later slammed the rumours saying "Arrey issme real ya unreal status ki kya baat hai? (There is no question of real and unreal status) It's sad that I am giving clarification on this when the fact is that I am already preparing for my role. The film is pretty much on and I am also not going anywhere". As Basu was approached, she immediately agreed after she read the script and was "blown away" by it. She had previously worked with Abbas-Mustan in her debut film Ajnabee (2001) and in Race (2008). Vinod Khanna made a comeback since his cameo appearance in Dabangg (2010), and was chosen to play a small but key role as the mastermind of the heist over the likes of Amitabh Bachchan, Rishi Kapoor and Dharmendra. Aftab Shivdasani was hired to play a guest cameo appearance.

It was Abbas Mustan's first time working with all the actors except for Basu and Deol, who they had previously cast together in Ajnabee. The latter in five films, along with Johnny Lever who has played minor roles in all but two of their films. It was also the second pairing of Bachchan and Kapoor, who reunited after Delhi-6 (2009). Bachchan had also worked with Basu and Sikandar Kher (son of actors Anupam Kher and Kirron Kher) in Dhoom 2 (2006) and Khelein Hum Jee Jaan Sey respectively.

=== Pre-production ===
Before shooting could begin, the entire cast underwent physical training to the requirement of the roles they were playing. Bachchan was required to tone up the most as he was the lead character and had to perform dangerous train stunts. For her role Kapoor, was required to learn to drive a car, although she had no previous experience. She practised in the small lanes of Juhu and after reassurance from her father Anil Kapoor to the directors, Kapoor drove, only to crash the car. Abbas Burmawalla commented on this "Our action director Allan Amin felt that she should get comfortable zipping around in the Mini Cooper. So about 10 days before we started shooting, Sonam started practicing driving the Mini. However, on the first day, she accelerated while reversing, and banged into a lamppost". Basu was required to wear a bikini during one of the songs, had gained weight during the year and worked with personal trainer Paul Britto, to ensure the perfect body. Her regime included functional training with abdominal exercises, kickboxing, aerobic exercise, stretching and weight training. Shweta Bhardwaj, who was playing a pivotal character in the film, was also required to physically tone up for an entirely different bikini scene.

=== Filming ===
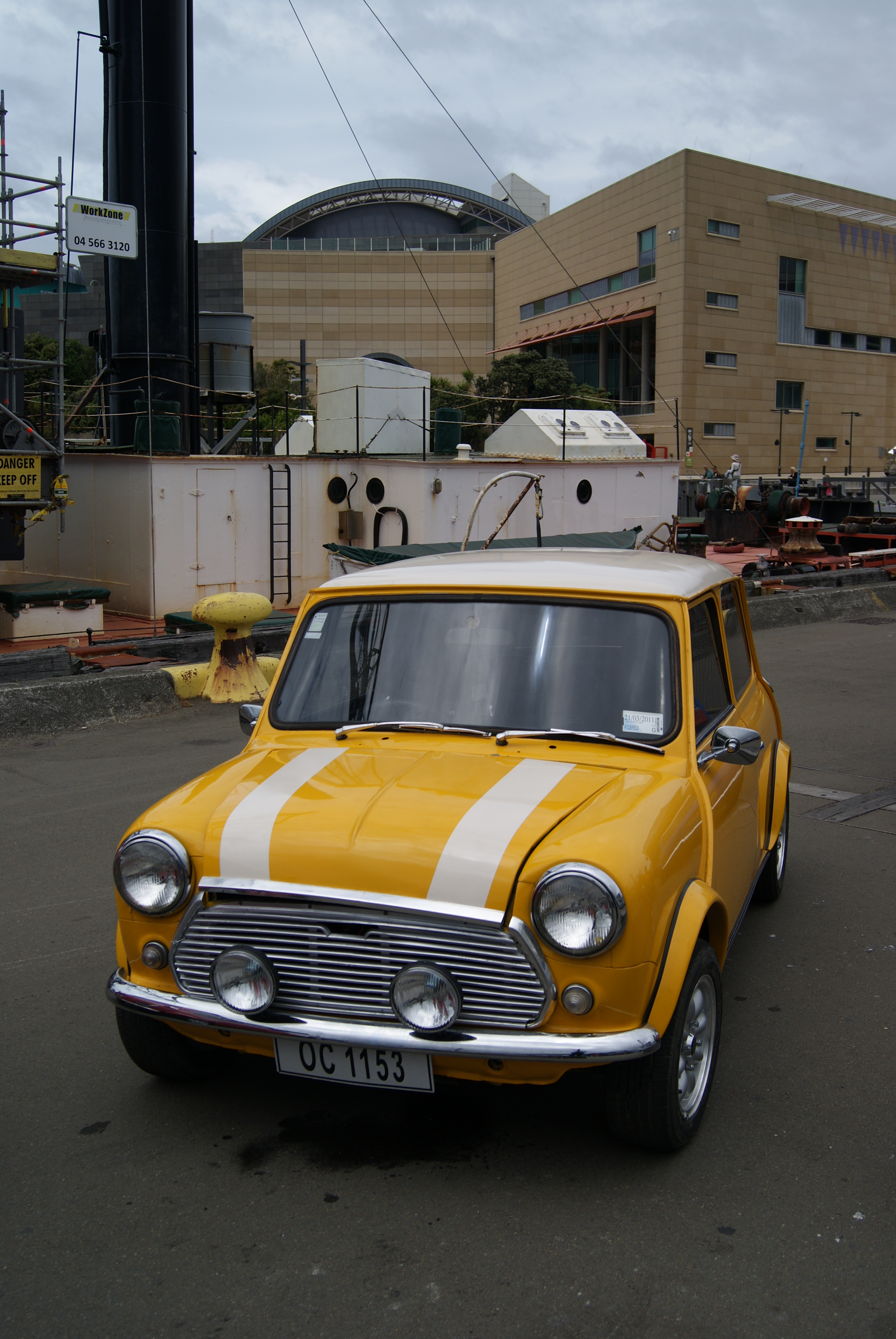
One of the three Minis used in the production (this one was driven by Sonam Kapoor in the film) on location in Wellington, New Zealand

Filming in India, mainly in Goa, began on 9 November 2010 and continued until the end of December 2010. The song "Buddhi Do Bhagwaan" was filmed on Miramar beach in Goa.

The second phase of filming began in New Zealand in mid January 2011, in locations across Wellington and Auckland. Wellington City Council closed some areas of the city centre for two weeks so there would be no problems in shooting. Scenes were shot across the City to Sea Bridge, Okarito Lagoon on New Zealand's South Island, Te Papa's Awesome Forces Museum, Cuba Mall and in the Tulsi Indian restaurant. The replication of the "Mini Coopers" scene from the 2003 version of The Italian Job was filmed at Wellington Airport, which Bachchan had difficulty with due to his height, as he could not get in and out of the cars quickly. There was some controversy when airport officials refused to give permission for filming when they felt it was dangerous; the scene required a plane to overfly three Minis, which were being driven by Bachchan, Kapoor and Kher, and miss by inches. The traffic jam sequence involving the Minis was also shot in Wellington. Sixth months before shooting had commenced in New Zealand, Abbas Mustan met with the Tourism Board and Film Council in Wellington and they put up LED signs, to notify local residents of the street closure during that weekend. The crew finished shooting and left New Zealand just days before an earthquake hit the country.

The third schedule of shooting, which was the longest and most important, began in April 2011 in parts of Siberia, St Petersburg and Murmansk. For the shooting in Siberia, the directors had a lot of difficulty acquiring permission. Similarly, they had also faced several problems during the shooting in New Zealand. Describing this ordeal, Mustan Burmawalla said, "We had to seek lot of permissions for a traffic jam scene to be shot in New Zealand and that took a long time. While, in Russia we faced language problem, we appointed about 25 interpreters. We needed them to help us about basic things like where to go to eat etc.,". Owing to the difficulty allotting dates, Bachchan had to leave another project by Ram Gopal Varma titled Department, whom Varma would later blame for the dismal performance of the film at the box office. The sequences involving the train were directed by Filmfare award winning, stunt director Allan Amin. Bachchan refused to have a body double for the scenes and performed all the dangerous stunts himself. During the sequence, he had to balance himself atop two trains which were travelling at approximately 100 km/h. He hit his head on a rod on top of the train, but still managed to complete the scene. During another scene Bachchan was left hanging by a rack on the train for around 20 hours. While filming took place there, a group of Russian soldiers learnt that an Indian film was shooting nearby and joined the crew on the sets and requested to meet all the stars.

Some of the scenes were filmed close to the Arctic Circle, Arctic Ocean and at the North Pole, which was the first time a Bollywood film had been filmed there. However a slight problem arose; no food was available because of the extremely cold climate and everyone had to manage on packets of soups. Shooting in Russia ended in late July 2011. The cast flew back to India, finalised a few last minute shots and songs, before the film went into the post-production stage.

== Soundtrack ==
The soundtrack was composed and directed by Pritam and the background score was composed by Sandeep Shirodkar. The lyrics were written by Ashish Pandit. The music rights were sold to T-Series and released on 8 December 2011. The movie marked the third collaboration between the composer and the director duo, after Naqaab, and most popularly, Race.

== Release ==
The release of Players was repeatedly delayed; it was initially planned for a Diwali release but the film was not completed in time, as the story demanded extensive filming of action scenes. Hussain Burmawala took six-and-a-half months to complete the editing, which is the longest time taken for any Indian film to be edited. The release was expected on 9 December 2011 alongside Ladies vs Ricky Bahl and Agent Vinod but was further delayed until 26 December, to make more time for promotions. Bachchan requested that the film was released at a later date as he wanted to avoid a clash with Shahrukh Khan's Don 2. Players was finally released on 6 January 2012, making it the first released Bollywood film of 2012.

=== Pre-release ===
Before its release, Players garnered a lot of curiosity from Bollywood movie buffs and critics, ever since the first preview which generated a positive response from the audience. The directors Abbas-Mustan, who are known for their adaptations of Hollywood films into Indian-esque classic thrillers, returned to direction after quite some time. They had promised to break the boundaries of the action genre, as the major action stunts and sequences in the film were performed on par with Hollywood by the actors themselves. This is rarely seen or done in Bollywood. Kapoor who had previously played mostly girl next door type roles, brought a completely different look to her previous films, which attracted positive attention and was tagged as "sexy" by the media once the films promo's released. Another reason the film had created curiosity was because none of the actors except Basu had enjoyed much box office success, while the rest were relative newcomers. Bachchan, who had been in the industry for over 10 years, had endured a series of flops, in spite of this the directors were confident of him.

Players was named as one of the most-awaited films of 2012 by Mid-Day, IBN Live, Hindustan Times, India Today and The Times of India.

=== Promotion ===
The first look at the film, along with teasers and an extended promo was revealed on 3 November 2011, on Kaun Banega Crorepati, which featured Abhishek's father, Amitabh Bachchan as the host. Amitabh Bachchan also helped to promote the film on his blog and Twitter feed. The theatrical trailer was also released on 3 November 2011, on the movie's official YouTube channel and Facebook page.

Players had an extended promotion schedule since its release was delayed for an extra month. Promotion for the film was orchestrated by using tactics never seen before. The campaign began at the music launch on 12 December 2011, where the team promoted the film in a first event of its kind, as the lead actors Abhishek Bachchan, Bobby Deol, Bipasha Basu, Sonam Kapoor, Neil Nitin Mukesh, Sikandar Kher and Omi Vaidya performed live stunts. Deol, who played an illusionist in the film, performed the opening act as he disappeared from two different towers. Kapoor drove an armoured truck through a golden brick wall and then drove around the arena. She was followed by Kher, who according to his role of an explosives expert, set off multiple explosions with a remote control, throwing a car 40 feet into the air before it hit another car, blowing both cars up. Vaidya and Mukesh spoke some dialogues from the film. Bachchan was followed in a car by Basu on a pillion as they both drove through a ring of fire and blew a bus up. Bachchan fractured one of his fingers during the stunt when he drove a car through a sheet of glass and performed the doughnut act and a 360-degree wheelie.

Promotion continued at various airports and railway stations like the Delhi Metro where Bachchan, Mukesh and Kapoor fabricated a train heist similar to the one in the film, after which they travelled inside the Metro, followed by a media interaction and later gave away some merchandise from the film. At Chandigarh Airport, the actors spoke about their characters and signed autographs. Players was also promoted elsewhere in India, such as the Ambience Mall and the Inorbit Mall. Kapoor featured as a guest on Imagine TV's Nachle Ve with Saroj Khan and Bachchan promoted the film on Arjun Rampal's show Love 2 Hate U, where he met his biggest hater. Kapoor and Mukesh also appeared on reality show Bigg Boss's season 5 during the semi-finals, four days before Players was released. Players was heavily promoted in London with help from the cast of the 2003 remake of The Italian Job, including Charlize Theron, Mark Wahlberg, Edward Norton and the director F. Gary Gray. The film was released in UK cinemas by B4U Pictures. The producers of Players held "Go for Gold" competitions where the winner would meet the cast and spend a day with them.

=== Premiere ===
Players had its worldwide premiere in Dubai on 4 January 2012. It was held at the Grand Cineplex in the Global Village and was attended by Bachchan, Basu, Kapoor and Mukesh. Instead of the traditional red carpet, a golden carpet was used in keeping with the theme of the film. Kapoor caused controversy over the outfit she had worn during the premiere, giving her a busty look and was verbally attacked by Fashion bloggers.

== Reception ==
=== Critical reception ===
Players received a mixed reception from critics. Subhash K. Jha from Bollywood Hungama wrote, "Players does a first-rate job of adapting The Italian Job. It's slick and well-written, eye-catching and intelligent, witty and delectable. It beats every other action-adventure flick in recent Bollywood history". Nikhat Kazmi of The Times of India gave the film a rating of 3.5 out of 5 stars and wrote, "Music by Pritam is good while it lasts. Some editing sorely needed, visual imagery quite polished, and the look, as usual, is of new age Bollywood." Daily Bhaskar rated it 3 out of 5 and said, "Direction by Abbas-Mustan, cinematography and an edgy plotline are the strong points. Music, dialogues and performances (besides Bipasha and Neil's performance) are the weak points". Piyali Dasgupta from NDTV gave it 3 out of 5 stars and said, "Players ends up as a fun weekend flick, especially for action buffs. Abhishek Bachchan shows some of the styles of the Dhoom series. Neil Nitin Mukesh, largely off the radar after an intense performance. Bipasha, too shows a hint of Race with her glamorous role and that red bikini. Sonam Kapoor somewhat redeems herself as an actor playing the good geek Naina. But don't expect much from Pritam's music." Zee News gave it 3 out of 5 stars and said, "Abbas Mustan's 'Players' is a slick, fast-paced and racy thriller. Technically the film is brilliant, but when it comes to drama and emotions, the film falls flat on its face. In comparison to The Italian Job, Players’ is long and overstretched. Kaveree Bamzai of India Today also gave it 3 out of 5.

Players also received a number of negative reviews. Taran Adarsh from Bollywood Hungama gave it 2 out of 5 stars and wrote, "On the whole, Players rides mainly on the clout of its credible director duo [Abbas-Mustan], daredevil stunts and stunning visuals. But, most importantly, it is deficient of a captivating screenplay". Rajeev Masand of IBN Live rated it 2 out of 5 and wrote, "Players is a fastpaced khichdi. Abhishek Bachchan is earnest, and thankfully dials down his trademark smugness to play the ringleader of the team. Neil Nitin Mukesh gets some interesting scenes to sink his teeth into. Bipasha Basu fills out a bikini nicely, but poor Sonam Kapoor changes her costumes and her hairstyle more frequently than her expressions. What could have been a satisfying entertainer doesn't quite achieve its potential. Karan Anshuman of the Mumbai Mirror gave it 2 out of 5 stars. Aniruddha Guha from DNA India awarded it 2 out of 5 and wrote, "The writing is juvenile, the dialogues a joke, the acting over-the-top, yet everyone seems to be taking themselves so seriously". Sukanya Verma of Rediff also gave the film a rating of 2 out of 5 stars and wrote, "Players is lacklustre and unimaginative". Mayank Shekhar of the Hindustan Times gave it 1.5 out of 5. Komal Nahta from Koimoi rated it 1 out of 5 and wrote, "Whats good? The train robbery sequence; some comedy in the second half; Omi Vaidya and Neil Nitin Mukesh's acting. Whats bad? The loose and uninteresting screenplay; the poor music; the dull acting of Abhishek, Sonam and Bobby". Yahoo! Movies gave the film a rating of "Game Over" and said that, "the remake of "The Italian Job is definitely a job taken not so seriously".

=== Box office ===
==== India ====
Players had a wide release of over 2000 prints, but despite the film having an extensive promotion schedule it only opened to around 35–40% occupancy, as it failed to make any headway over the weekend, grossing ₹14.8 crore (US$1.6 million). Daily collections were ₹4.6 crore (US$490,000) on Friday and ₹4.5 crore (US$480,000) on Saturday. There was a small rise on Sunday as the film made ₹5.75 crore (US$610,000). On Monday, its revenues decreased as it made ₹2.25 crore (US$240,000).

Collections decreased throughout the first week. On Tuesday the film grossed ₹1.65 crore (US$180,000), on Wednesday it made ₹1.45 crore (US$150,000) and on Thursday ₹1.25 crore (US$130,000), making the total first week revenues ₹21.5 crore (US$2.3 million). The second Friday was extremely poor; Players grossed just 6 million compared to its reasonable first Friday gross of ₹46.5 million (US$500,000). Over its second weekend, even with a small increase on Saturday, the film only earned ₹25.0 million (US$270,000), taking its total 10-day collections to around ₹24 crore (US$2.6 million). In its second full week Players grossed ₹5.92 crore (US$630,000) and in its third week it grossed ₹2.25 crore (US$240,000) taking the total three-week revenues to around ₹29 crore (US$3.1 million). Players saw a further drop in its fourth week, grossing 800,000, due to the release of Agneepath. After six weeks Players ended its total lifetime collections at ₹40 crore (US$4.3 million). It was declared a Disaster by Box Office India.

==== Overseas ====
Players also failed to make an impact overseas, earning ₹4.4 crore (US$470,000) to ₹4.5 crore (US$480,000) on its first weekend. Its performance was dismal in Australia and below average in the UK and USA, although it performed respectably in the UAE and Fiji. It was most successful in New Zealand where it had the largest cinematic release of an Indian film in the country. 11 prints were distributed to two of New Zealand's biggest cinema chains, Event and Hoyts. Players exceeded the previous record held by Don 2 (2011), which was released two weeks earlier with nine prints.

== Controversies ==
"There was damage to some locations. They worked 30 something, 32 days on the trot. That's a safety concern in itself. Making it easier isn't necessarily the best approach. What we need to do is find a way to get the two industries to work together, because they have quite a different way of working from us."

— President of the New Zealand Film Technicians' Guild, Alun Bollinger

During the shooting in New Zealand, authorities at an airport refused to give permission to film a scene, having decided it was too dangerous. An aeroplane was to fly a few inches above three cars, which were being driven by Bachchan, Kapoor, and Kher. The stunt directors Mark and Allan Amin rehearsed the scene, and the airport authorities finally gave permission because it was an important scene. The New Zealand Government and the local film crew were also unhappy and claimed the crew of Players had disregarded New Zealand laws and cared little for health and safety concerns, took months to pay invoices and damaged some locations. John Key, the Prime Minister of New Zealand, had declared tax breaks for Bollywood films shooting in New Zealand to attract more film-makers. After Players did well at the New Zealand box office, laws allowing more film crews and actors to shoot there were to be enacted, causing concerns among the New Zealand people and authorities.

Initially, the way Chopra left the project, was deemed controversial, as it was said that the directors had been directly influenced by Bachchan. Bachchan and Chopra had previously starred together in several films, including Bluffmaster and Dostana, the former directed by Rohan Sippy, Bachchan's long time family friend. It was reported that Chopra had refused to star in another one of his films, due to this, Bachchan had asked her to be dropped. However Abbas Burmawalla cleared Bachchan's name, saying "The star cast of The Italian Job was finalized long time back. We had signed Abhishek Bachchan, Neil Nitin Mukesh and Katrina Kaif in the first go and Katrina was always our first choice so there was no question of talking to Priyanka Chopra. She was never approached or spoken to for this role so how can Priyanka lose out on a role she was never even considered for?".

Players received a U/A certificate. Controversy erupted regarding the Censor Boards clarification to a scene in which Kapoor is seen making the middle finger gesture, which was clearly visible in the promos of the film. It was initially blurred out but was later approved after appeals from the directors and Kapoor, who stated, "I don't believe in censorship so whether they like it or not, I really don't care about it. I just want people to come and see my film. Showing a middle finger is a part of today's youth". Media criticised her, claiming "For Sonam Kapoor, showing middle finger is no big deal" and the censor board for allowing the scene pass without cuts or blurring; a similar scene in Ranbir Kapoor's Rockstar (2011) had also been allowed. The issue was brought to light once again, when cricketer Virat Kohli famously made the gesture at Australian fans (two days before the film's release) during the Australia vs India 2011–12 series.

== Impact ==
After the poor financial performance of Players, Bachchan's lack of success continued, and he was dropped from his next film role. The unexpected failure of the film led to many trade industry analysts reinstating the belief of a jinx in Bollywood that the first-released film of the year always fails at the box office, which happened to the films Halla Bol (2008), Chandni Chowk To China (2009), Pyaar Impossible! and Dulha Mil Gaya (2010). This had been happening for years until 2011 when No One Killed Jessica became a "semi hit" supposedly breaking the jinx. The analysts were confident that Players would be successful.

Plans for a sequel to Players were scrapped after major disputes began between the directors Abbas-Mustan and producers Viacom 18, who claimed that Abbas–Mustan had made changes to the script without their consent and that the film had gone over budget from ₹450 million (US$4.8 million) to around ₹800 million (US$8.5 million) which had caused them extra losses. Bachchan, who was signed for approximately ₹7 crore (US$750,000), forfeited his payment of ₹2.8 crore (US$300,000) and claimed he was "happy with the way the film was shot" and he turned down the balance fee owed to him. The film initially recovered most of its cost through theatrical rights, sold for ₹35 crore (US$3.7 million) to Ponty Chadha, music rights bought by T-Series for ₹3.5 crore (US$370,000), and satellite rights that were sold to Zee TV for an approximate ₹17 crore (US$1.8 million). The total loss amounted to around ₹8 crore (US$850,000).

== See also ==
- Bollywood films of 2012
- The Italian Job (1969)
- Charlie Croker
- Heist film
