= Mrinalini Sharma =

Indian model and Bollywood actress (born 1977)

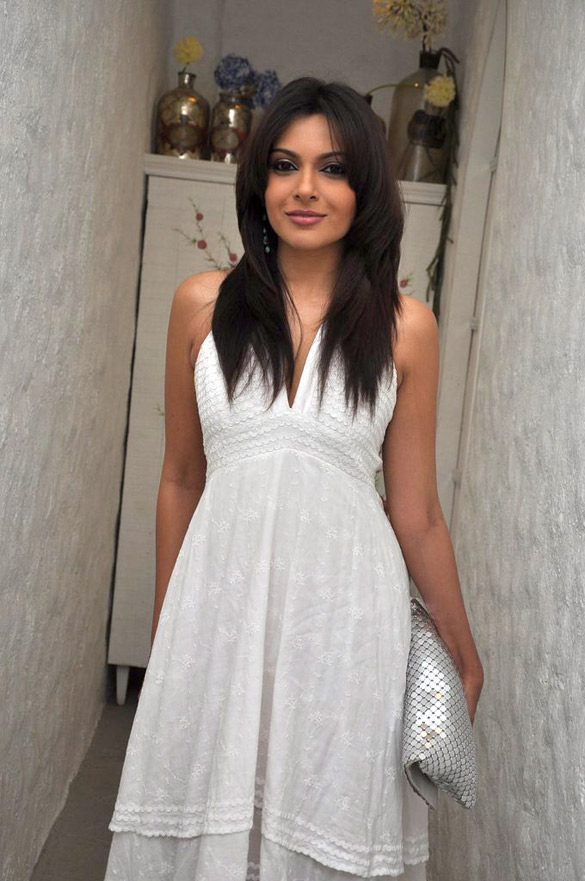
- Mrinalini Sharma at the Kallista Spa opening
- Born: 27 September 1977 (age 49); Delhi, India
- Occupations: Actress, model

Mrinalini Sharma (born 27 September 1977) is an Indian model and Bollywood actress.

== Early life and education ==
Sharma hails from New Delhi. Mrinalini did her schooling in Carmel Convent School, Chanakyapuri, New Delhi. Thereafter she did her graduation from Jesus and Mary College, Delhi (University of Delhi).

== Career ==
Sharma started her career as a model in Delhi and soon shifted to Mumbai. She has been cast in many commercial advertisements and began her career in Bollywood with an item number in Prakash Jha's movie Apaharan.

Her acting career took off with three films with Mahesh Bhatt. The first one was Awarapan in which she got to share the screen space with Emraan Hashmi. The movie also starred actress Shriya Saran. The other movie was choreographer Raju Khan's directorial debut Showbiz.

== Filmography ==
Key
| † | Denotes films that have not yet been released |

| Year | Title | Role(s) | Director(s) | Notes | Ref. |
|---|---|---|---|---|---|
| 2005 | Apaharan | ——— | Prakash Jha | Special appearance in the song "Aaiye, aao ji babu" | |
| 2006 | Beyond Purgatory | Sister | Peter Ausburn | English; Short film | |
| 2007 | Awarapan | Reema | Mohit Suri | | |
| 2007 | Showbiz | Shikha Verma | Raju Khan | | |
| 2010 | Hide N Seek | Jyotika Jhalani | Shawn Arranha | | |
| 2011 | Soundtrack | Shonali | Neerav Ghosh | | |
| 2012 | Jodi Breakers | Irra | Ashwini Chaudhary | | |
| 2013 | 3G | Chaima/Jasmine | Sheershak Anand; Shantanu Ray Chhibber | | |
| 2018 | Ishqeria | Radhika | Prerna Wadhawan | | |
