= Aparna Sharma =

Indian model-turned-actress

- Born: Lucknow, Uttar Pradesh, India
- Occupation(s): Actress, model
- Parent: Bhuvaneshwar Surajbhan Sharma (father)

Aparna Sharma (born 23 July 1990) is an Indian model-turned-actress. She was born in Lucknow and brought up in several parts of India. Sharma completed her secondary education from The Air Force School, Delhi, and her graduation from Delhi University.

Sharma was signed by the Elite model management company, which was the start of her modeling career. After her stint in the modeling industry she did her first film, Rum Pum Posshh, produced by Shailesh R. Singh. The movie was slated to release in 2015. However, her debut film was Guddu Ki Gun, directed by Shantanu and Sheershak and produced by Eminox Media, slated to release on 30 October 2015. The trailer was released on 5 October 2015.

== Personal life ==
Sharma has lived in several parts of India including Himachal Pradesh, Delhi and Mumbai due to her father's job in the Indian Air Force. She pursued her higher education while living in Delhi. When her father's job brought the family to Mumbai, Sharma decided to try modeling.

== Career ==
During her modeling tenure, Sharma did TV commercials for Parle Monaco with Aamir Khan, ESPN Brand Film with John Abraham, Coke with Imran Khan, Chik Satin Shampoo, Samsung Mobile, and more.

The upcoming movie Guddu Ki Gun is Sharma's debut feature film. She has also signed a three-movie contract with Balaji Motion Pictures.

She has also acted in the Alt Balaji web series XXX in its first-season episode 2 Sumitra G as a Hindi tele soap actress Sumitra.
