= Yogesh Mittal =

Indian film director (born 1976)

- Born: 21 December 1976 (age 48); Delhi, India
- Years active: 1999-present
- Spouse: Shilpa Mittal (2013 – present)

Yogesh Mittal (born 21 December 1976) is an Indian film director, screenwriter and producer. He turned director with Hindi thriller Yeh Faasley (2011).

Before becoming a director he has earlier worked as an assistant director with several production houses, with director Rajkumar Santoshi.

== Early life and background ==
Yogesh Mittal was born in Delhi, India to Omprakash Mittal, a film producer and distributor, and Prem Mittal, a bank manager. He was discouraged to get into show business by his father. His schooling was at St. Xavier's School, Delhi. Immediately after school he was sent to Australia for further studies in economics at University of Western Sydney, Nepean, Australia. But he changed his subjects in college to communications and arts – film studies to follow his passion. When he returned to India in 1999 his father didn't speak to him for a year for his decision of change in career.

== Career ==
Yogesh moved to Mumbai in 1999, to follow his passion of film making and started his career as an assistant director with Boney Kapoor. Under Boney Kapoor he assisted films like "Shakti", "Koi Mere Dil Se Poochhe", "Hamara Dil Aapke Paas Hai", "pukar" to name a few.

He turned director with thriller family drama Yeh Faasley (2011) starring Anupam Kher, Tena Desae and Pawan Malhotra.

=== Future projects ===
His future projects include a love story and a family drama. Both the scripts are under development.

== Filmography ==
- Sirf Tum (1999) as AD
- Hamara Dil Aapke Paas Hai (2000) as AD
- Pukar (2000) as AD
- Koi Mere Dil Se Poochhe (2002) as AD
- Shakti: The Power (2002) as AD
- Samay: When Time Strikes (2003) as Chief AD
- MP3: Mera Pehla Pehla Pyaar (2007) as Chief AD
- Yeh Faasley (2011) Director

=== As producer ===
- 2011 Yeh Faasley

=== As writer ===
- 2011 Yeh Faasley (screenplay / story)
