= Neil Nitin Mukesh =

Indian actor (born 1982)

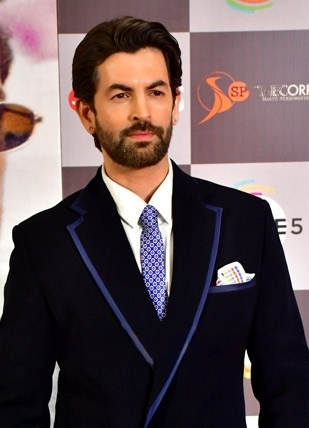
- Mukesh in 2025
- Born: Neil Nitin Mukesh Chand Mathur; 15 January 1982 (age 44); Bombay (now Mumbai), Maharashtra, India
- Occupation: Actor
- Years active: 1988–1989; 2007–present
- Spouse: Rukmini Sahay (m. 2017)
- Children: 1
- Father: Nitin Mukesh
- Relatives: Mukesh (grandfather)

Neil Nitin Mukesh Chand Mathur (born 15 January 1982) is an Indian actor and producer known for his work in Hindi films. He is the son of playback singer Nitin Mukesh and grandson of singer Mukesh. He debuted as a child artist in Vijay (1988) and Jaisi Karni Waisi Bharnii (1989), and would go on to make his full-fledged debut playing the title role in Johnny Gaddaar (2007). Since then, he has starred in New York (2009), Prem Ratan Dhan Payo (2015), Golmaal Again (2017), and Saaho (2019). He made his Tamil film debut with Kaththi (2014), Telugu film debut with Kavacham (2018) and Malayalam film debut with Khalifa: The Ruler (2026)

== Early life and background ==
Neil was born as Neil Nitin Mukesh Chand Mathur on 15 January 1982 in Bombay (presently Mumbai), Maharashtra, India. He is the son of playback singer Nitin Mukesh, and grandson of veteran singer Mukesh. His paternal grandmother was a Gujarati Shrimali Brahmin while his paternal grandfather was a Mathur Kayastha from Delhi. He was named by Lata Mangeshkar after the American astronaut Neil Armstrong. As a child, he appeared in Vijay (1988) and Jaisi Karni Waisi Bharnii (1989) as the younger versions of Rishi Kapoor and Govinda respectively.

Neil was educated at HR College in Mumbai, where he graduated with a bachelor's degree in commerce at his father's insistence. He then decided to pursue a career in acting, despite being born into a family of singers. In an interview with The Times of India, the actor said "singing is my hobby, but acting is my passion. A passion that even my grand-dad harboured. So, while my father continued his legacy and became a singer, I pursued his other passion. I am living his dream". Neil trained at a four-month workshop at the Kishore Namit Kapoor Acting Institute, and received training from actor Anupam Kher.

=== 2007–2010: Debut and breakthrough ===
Mukesh debuted in Sriram Raghavan's 2007 thriller Johnny Gaddaar. His portrayal of a crook received positive reviews from critics and earned him a nomination for the Filmfare Award for Best Male Debut. Taran Adarsh of Bollywood Hungama described Neil as a "complete natural": "The youngster carries off the part with dexterity. There's just one word to describe his performance – superb!" However, despite critical acclaim, the film failed to do well at the box office.

His first 2009 film was the science-fiction thriller Aa Dekhen Zara. Co-starring with Bipasha Basu, he played a struggling photographer who inherits a camera (whose photos predict the future) from his scientist grandfather. The film was a critical and commercial failure. His performance received mixed reviews from critics; while Nikhat Kazmi described him as charming and effortless, Raja Sen of Rediff.com said he "seems to have cleverly picked another character that doesn't require him to act much beyond the fish-out-of-water routine".

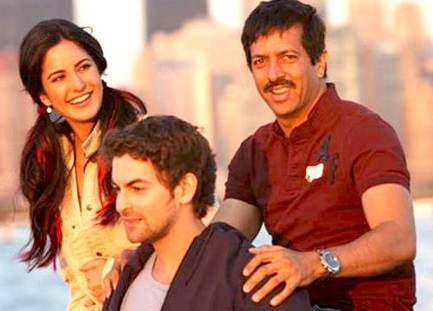
Mukesh with Katrina Kaif and Kabir Khan on the sets of New York, 2009

His breakthrough came with Kabir Khan's drama thriller New York with John Abraham, Katrina Kaif and Irrfan Khan. Exploring the aftermath of the 9/11, the film was a critical and commercial success, earning over ₹610 million (US$6.3 million) worldwide. His performance was praised by critics, earning him a nomination for the Filmfare Award for Best Supporting Actor. Subhash K Jha wrote: "Neil as the sophomore with stars and stripes in his eyes is fully convincing credible and supportive of the two central performances."

His final film of the year was Madhur Bhandarkar's Jail, a drama revolving around the cruel reality faced by prisoners in Indian jails. The film's aesthetically shot nude scene (demonstrating the torture Mukesh's character received in jail) and a masturbation scene sparked controversy; as a result, the latter scene was shortened. Mukesh remarked, "My nude or masturbation scenes are not for titillation. It's a very practical need in the script. My character is in jail without sex for 2-1/2 years. What does he do? He naturally seeks pleasure by himself." A commercial failure, the film and his performance were praised by critics. Taran Adarsh wrote: "Not only does Neil Nitin Mukesh deliver his finest performance to date, but the performance would easily rank amongst the finest this year. He conveys the pathos and helplessness that this character demands with amazing understanding. He deserves all praise for his extra-ordinary portrayal."

In 2010, Mukesh featured in Pradeep Sarkar's action drama Lafangey Parindey alongside Deepika Padukone. While the film received mixed reviews, his portrayal of a fighter was appreciated by critics. According to Sify's Sonia Chopra, Neil's "underplayed acting style complements the character's sketch perfectly". Blessy Chettiar of Daily News and Analysis noted: "He looks great in every frame and carries off [the character's] rugged demeanour with panache." Lafangey Parindey was a moderate commercial success, with a worldwide revenue of ₹310 million (US$3.2 million). Neil then starred in Sudhir Mishra's dramatic thriller Tera Kya Hoga Johnny.

He was also been a brand ambassador to the clothing brand Oxemberg in April 2010.

=== 2011–present: Later career ===
The following year Mukesh starred in Vishal Bhardwaj's 7 Khoon Maaf, a black comedy-drama (based on Ruskin Bond's short story Susanna's Seven Husbands) featuring Priyanka Chopra as a woman who murders her seven husbands in an unending quest for love. The actor was cast as Chopra's first husband, Major Edwin Rodriques, an arrogant, jealous and possessive army officer who lost a leg in Punjab's Operation Blue Star in 1984. The film premiered at the 61st Berlin Film Festival; it was a commercial failure, receiving mixed reviews from critics, but Mukesh's performance was praised. Nikhat Kazmi wrote that he "excelled as the brute."

In 2012, Mukesh starred in Abbas–Mustan's Players as part of an ensemble cast including Abhishek Bachchan, Sonam Kapoor, Bipasha Basu and Bobby Deol. The film was a remake of the 2003 Hollywood heist thriller The Italian Job; it was also a commercial failure, receiving mixed to negative reviews from critics (as did Mukesh's performance). Subhash K Jha said he "brings a mean menacing tone to the villainy." And according to Rediff.com's Sukanya Verma, Mukesh "mistakes sinister for superficial, resulting in a truly phony performance."

In 2013, Mukesh worked in three films, though all were commercially unsuccessful. His first release was Bejoy Nambiar's action-drama David, in which he played a gangster whose boss controls the Asian community in 1970's London. The actor said his character's dual personality appealed to him: "Here was this hardcore, extremely violent gangster and on the other hand, my director wanted me to show the emotional and romantic side to him too." The film received mixed reviews, but Mukesh's performance was critically acclaimed. Writing for The Times of India, Madhureeta Mukherjee described it as "restrained and powerful" and CNN-IBN's Rajeev Masand said that Mukesh is "nicely understated".

He next appeared opposite Sonal Chauhan in Eros International's horror film 3G. Filmed in Fiji, the film told the story of how the duo face supernatural occurrences when they buy a 3G-enabled phone. The film was not well received by critics. In a review for Rediff.com, Ankur Pathak said that Mukesh is "aggressively over the top" and added that his "body language is consistently uncomfortable." He also appeared in Susi Ganeshan's crime thriller Shortcut Romeo with Ameesha Patel and Puja Gupta. The picture ran into trouble when it got a limited release by its producers, and emerged as a major commercial failure. On his performance, Madhureeta Mukherjee of The Times of India said: "Neil performs well as always, he looks good (he needs to tone down his physicality for such roles) and proves that actors like him need better scripts to justify their true potential."

Mukesh has completed work on two films – Prerna Wadhwan's romantic drama Ishqeria, which will see him star opposite Richa Chadda, and Manish Vatsalya's Dussehra, where Mukesh will feature as an encounter specialist with Tena Desae. He debuted in Tamil cinema with AR Murugadoss's Kaththi. He also acted in Sooraj R. Barjatya's 2015 family drama Prem Ratan Dhan Payo with Salman Khan and Sonam Kapoor. He also made a guest appearance in Wazir.

In November 2018, he turned producer with Bypass Road, a thriller-drama film directed by his brother Naman Nitin Mukesh and written by himself.

In 2019, he appeared in Saaho, a multilingual film directed by Sujeeth, playing an antagonist Jai aka Ashok Chakravarty.

In 2024, he acted in Ashwni Dhir's Hisaab Barabar, a social drama, and Ashok K. Mishra's Backfire.

In 2025, he appeared in the TV series Hai Junoon!, as well as the film Ek Chatur Naar.

== Personal life ==
In 2017, Mukesh married Rukmini Sahay.

In April 2018, Neil Nitin Mukesh announced via Instagram that the couple were expecting their first child. A daughter, Nurvi Neil Mukesh, was born on 20 September 2018.

== Other ventures ==
=== Social activism ===
In 2009, Mukesh started an NGO to support and help needy women by providing them with food, shelter and vocational training to support themselves. The philanthropic project was named for his grandmother, Saral Devi Mathur. The actor said: "I have read about women getting oppressed, exploited by men and other family members. They get sold like commodities and are driven into prostitution. I'm always pained to hear all this and at the back of my mind I had thought that I would start an organisation to support such women." In 2012, he joined with Volkswagen in support of an environmental campaign called "Think Blue", an initiative increasing awareness of water scarcity and other pressing ecological issues.

=== Award ceremony participation ===
Mukesh participated in the Hiru Golden Film Awards 2016 in Sri Lanka as a special guest, along with Bollywood actors such as Sunil Shetty, Jackie Shroff, and actresses Sridevi, Madhuri Dixit and Karishma Kapoor.

== Filmography ==
Key
†	Denotes films that have not yet been released

=== Film ===
Year	Film	Role	Notes
1988	Vijay	Young Vikram	Child artist
1989	Jaisi Karni Waisi Bharnii	Young Ravi Verma	Child artist
2002	Mujhse Dosti Karoge	—N/a	Assistant director
2007	Johnny Gaddaar	Vikram / Johnny G	Nominated – Filmfare Award for Best Male Debut
2009	Aa Dekhen Zara	Ray Acharya	
2009	New York	Omar Aijaz	Nominated – Filmfare Award for Best Supporting Actor
2009	Jail	Parag Dixit	
2010	Lafangey Parindey	Nandan Kamthekar	
2010	Tera Kya Hoga Johnny	Parvez	
2011	7 Khoon Maaf	Major Edwin Rodriques	
2012	Players	Spider	
2013	David	David and his son	
2013	3G	Sam	
2013	Shortcut Romeo	Sooraj	
2014	Kaththi	Chirag	Tamil film; Nominated – SIIMA Award for Actor in a Negative Role – Tamil
2015	Prem Ratan Dhan Payo	Yuvraj Ajay Singh	
2016	Wazir	Wazir	
2017	Indu Sarkar	Sanjay Gandhi	
2017	Golmaal Again	Nikhil	
2018	Ishqeria	Raghav	
2018	Dassehra	Rudra Pratap Singh	
2018	Kavacham	Vikramaditya	Telugu film
2019	Saaho	Jai / Ashok Chakravarthy	Simultaneously shot in Telugu
2019	Bypass Road	Vikram Kapoor	Also producer
2024	Hisaab Barabar	Micky Mehta	
2025	Ek Chatur Naar	Abhishek Verma	
2026	Khalifa: The Ruler	Harris	Malayalam film

=== Television ===
Year	Title	Role	Notes
2025	Hai Junoon!	Gagan Ahuja	

== Awards and nominations ==
Year	Award	Category	Film	Result
2008	International Indian Film Academy Awards	Star Debut of the Year – Male	Johnny Gaddaar	Nominated
2008	Zee Cine Awards	Special Award (Critics)	Johnny Gaddaar	Won
2008	Screen Awards	Most Promising Newcomer – Male	Johnny Gaddaar	Nominated
2008	Stardust Awards	Superstar of Tomorrow – Male	Johnny Gaddaar	Nominated
2008	Apsara Film & Television Producers Guild Awards	Best Actor in a Negative Role	Johnny Gaddaar	Won
2008	Filmfare Awards	Best Male Debut	Johnny Gaddaar	Nominated
2010	Filmfare Awards	Best Supporting Actor	New York	Nominated
2012	Screen Awards	Best Supporting Actor	7 Khoon Maaf	Nominated
2015	South Indian International Movie Awards	Best Actor in a Negative Role	Kaththi	Won
2017	IIFA Awards	Best Villain	Wazir	Nominated
2020	Zee Cine Awards Telugu	Favorite Supporting Actor – Male	Saaho	Won

== See also ==
- List of Indian film actors
