= Guddu Ki Gun =

2015 film by Shantanu Ray Chhibber and Sheershak Anand

- Theatrical Release Poster
- Directed by: Shantanu Ray Chhibber; Sheershak Anand
- Written by: Shantanu Ray Chhibber; Sheershak Anand
- Produced by: Sachin Jain
- Starring: Kunal Khemu; Payel Sarkar
- Narrated by: Shantilal Mukherjee
- Cinematography: Keiko Nakahara
- Edited by: Cheragh Todiwala
- Music by: Gajendra-Vikram; Raju Sardar; Soumyajit Bannerji; Score : Amar Mohile
- Distributed by: Emenox Media Pvt. Ltd
- Release date: 30 October 2015
- Running time: 130 minutes
- Country: India
- Language: Hindi

Guddu Ki Gun (transl. Guddu's gun/Guddu's goodness) is a Bollywood Adult comedy film directed by the duo Shantanu Ray Chhibber & Sheershak Anand. The film stars Kunal Khemu, debutant Aparna Sharma and marks the debut of Payel Sarkar (Bengali Actress) in Bollywood. It was released on 30 October 2015. The film is based on a washing-powder salesman, Guddu who has a golden penis.

== Plot ==
Guddu Ki Gun is the tale of Govardhan aka Guddu, a Bihari settled in Kolkata. He is a door-to-door salesman for washing powder, whose sales pitch is "Ek washing powder ke saath Guddu free" (With one washing powder, you get Guddu for free). While sharing a room with his close friend Ladoo, Guddu becomes a womanizer and leads an amorous lifestyle in Kolkata. His troubles begin when he ditches one of his girlfriends, Bholi. Furious at Guddu for forsaking his granddaughter, Bholi's grandfather, who is a magician, casts a black magic spell on him, causing his penis to turn golden. The only way Guddu can get rid of the curse is to find true love and stay faithful to her.

== Cast ==
- Kunal Khemu as Govardhan "Guddu" Prasad
- Payel Sarkar as Kaali
- Sumeet Vyas as Ladoo
- Nayani Dixit as Mrs. Kajol Mukhopadhyay
- Aparna Sharma as Bholi
- Shantilal Mukherjee as Anand "Antique Moshai" Mukhopadhyay, Kajol's husband
- Flora Saini as Nurse Sarita
- Jameel Khan as Don Marwadi
- Sanchari Sengupta as Ruby Marwadi
- Brijendra Kala as Dr. J. H. Atul Dasgupta
- Biplab Chatterjee as Bholi's grandfather
- Sudeep Sarangi as Akhilesh Tripathi, reporter
- Lacey Banghard as special appearance in "Ding Dong" song

== Soundtrack ==
The soundtrack for the album was composed by Gajendra Verma, Vikram Singh, Raju Sarkar and Saqi with lyrics written by Aseem Ahmed Abbasee, Vimal Kashyap and Soumyajit Banerjee.

No.	Title	Singer(s)	Length
1.	"Bihari Valentine"	Udit Narayan & Raju Sardar	4:37
2.	"Guddu Ki Gun"	Vikram, Gajendra, Vikram Singh	2:50
3.	"Chal Jayegi Chal Jayegi"	Kausar Sabri	3:29
4.	"Rehbra Ve"	Shweta Pandit, Mohit Chauhan	5:30
5.	"Ding Dong"	Sonu Kakkar	3:43
6.	"Kolkata Qutub Minar (Hindi Version)"	Soumyajit Banerjee	3:14
7.	"Kolkata Qutub Minar (Bengali Version)"	Soumyajit Banerjee	3:14
Total length:			26:37
