= Neyha Sharma =

Indian actor

- Born: Neha Sharma; Moradabad, Uttar Pradesh
- Occupations: Actor, Poet, Entrepreneur

Neyha Sharma is an Indian actor, a spoken word artist and an entrepreneur. In 2023, She founded an agency named Smalltown Dreams Entertainment. She was active at a theater group in Shankar Market, Delhi and had done many plays. She holds a PG Diploma in Creative Photography as well and has learned from Raghu Rai. In 2018, her short film came out which was jointly released by Farhan Akhtar Feroz Abbas Khan and Population Foundation of India on YouTube. The film is directed by Ranjeeta Kaur and gathered over one millions views in a short span of time.

== Filmography ==
Year	Title	Role	Notes
2013	Bajatey Raho	Aman's Friend	Movie
2015	Yam Hain Hum	Divya	TV series
2015	Talvar	Cameo	Movie
2018	She	Herself	Short Film
2019	Khandaani Shafakhana	Chickenpox girl	Movie
2021	Becharey	Somya/Mary Lele	Webseries
