= Amar Mohile =

Indian film score composer

- Born: India
- Genre: Film score
- Occupation: Musician
- Years active: 2002–present

Amar Mohile is an Indian film score composer who works predominantly in Hindi films. He is the son of composer Anil Mohile.

== Discography ==
As background score composer

Year	Film	Language	Ref
2002	Encounter: The Killing	Hindi	
2004	Vaastu Shastra	Hindi	
2005	Ek Ajnabee	Hindi	
2007	Aag	Hindi	
2008	Homam	Telugu	
2009	Jail	Hindi	
2009	Acid Factory	Hindi	
2009	Agyaat	Hindi	
2009	Luck	Hindi	
2009	Rann	Hindi	
2010	Chase	Hindi	
2010	Rann	Hindi	
2011	Land Gold Women	English	
2011	Money Money, More Money	Telugu	
2011	Singham	Hindi	
2011	Dongala Mutha	Telugu	
2012	Hate Story	Hindi	
2013	Zanjeer	Hindi	
2013	Shootout at Wadala	Hindi	
2013	3G	Hindi	
2013	The Attacks of 26/11	Hindi	
2013	Zila Ghaziabad	Hindi	
2013	Table No. 21	Hindi	
2013	1920: The Evil Returns	Hindi	
2013	Chennai Express	Hindi	
2014	Anvatt	Marathi	
2014	Kuku Mathur Ki Jhand Ho Gayi	Hindi	
2014	Ragini MMS 2	Hindi	
2015	MSG: The Messenger	Hindi	
2015	Jazbaa	Hindi	
2015	Guddu Ki Gun	Hindi	
2015	Dilwale	Hindi	
2016	1920 London	Hindi	
2017	Hindi Medium	Hindi	
2017	Golmaal Again	Hindi	
2018	Simmba	Hindi	
2019	Thackeray	Hindi	
2019	Amavas	Hindi	
2019	Hume Tumse Pyaar Kitna	Hindi	
2019	X Ray: The Inner Image	Hindi	
2020	Khuda Haafiz	Hindi	
2020	Laxmii	Hindi	
2021	Mumbai Saga	Hindi	
2021	Bhuj: The Pride of India	Hindi	
2021	Kya Meri Sonam Gupta Bewafa Hai?	Hindi	
2021	Sooryavanshi	Hindi	
2022	Runway 34	Hindi	
2022	Thank God	Hindi	
2022	Cirkus	Hindi	
2025	Ek Chatur Naar	Hindi	
2025	Unpaarvaiyil	Tamil	
2025	Divya Drusthi	Telugu	
2026	Manjar	Marathi	
2026	Drishyam: The Conclusion	Hindi	

=== As composer ===
- 2000 - Krodh
- 2004 - Ek Hasina Thi
- 2011 Bejawada (1 song)
- 2010 - Golmaal 3
- 2013 - Satya 2
- 2021 - Bhuj: The Pride of India
