= Dassehra =

- Directed by: Manish Vatsalya
- Screenplay by: Saurabh Choudhary
- Produced by: Aparna Hoshing
- Starring: Neil Nitin Mukesh; Tina Desai
- Cinematography: Sethu Sriram
- Edited by: Nipun Ashok Gupta
- Music by: Vijay Verma; Siddhant Madhav
- Production company: Rash Production Private Limited
- Release date: 26 October 2018
- Country: India
- Language: Hindi

Dassehra is a 2018 Indian Hindi-language action thriller film directed by Manish Vatsalya and produced by Aparna Hoshing. It stars Neil Nitin Mukesh, Tina Desai, and Manish Vatsalya. The film was released on 26 October 2018.

== Plot ==
Honest IPS officer SP Aditi Singh (Tina Desai) and hard-boiled cop DSP Rudra (Neil Nitin Mukesh) investigate a multiple suicide case. They stumble upon a darker truth revolving around the corrupt politicians Prasadi Lal, the Chief Minister (Govind Namdeo), and Shankar Yadav (Manish Vatsalya). The political nexus forces Rudra to become the angry-young-man and one-man-army all rolled into one.

== Cast ==
- Neil Nitin Mukesh as DSP Rudra Pratap Singh Chauhan IPS
- Tina Desai as SP Aditi Rudrapratap Singh IPS
- Govind Namdeo as Chief Minister Prasadi Lal
- Manish Vatsalya as Shankar Yadav
- Sharat Saxena as DGP N.K.Sharma IPS
- Arya Babbar as Inspector Honey Singh
- Pragya Maheshwari as Inspector Anjana Singh
- Swati Bakshi as Sarika Kashyap
- Murali Sharma as SI Dulare
- Yana Gupta as an item number in the song "Joganiya"
- Scarlett Mellish Wilson as an item number in the song "Maee Re"

== Soundtrack ==
Dassehra

Soundtrack album by Vijay Verma and Siddhant Madhav
- Released: 18 October 2018
- Recorded: 2016
- Genre: Feature film soundtrack
- Length: 21:03
- Language: Hindi
- Label: T-Series
- Producer: Aparna Hoshing
External audio
- Official Audio Jukebox on YouTube

The soundtrack is composed by Vijay Verma and Siddhant Madhav, while the lyrics are written by Rajesh Mànthan.

Track listing
No.	Title	Music	Singer(s)	Length
1.	"Hua Shankhnaad"	Vijay Verma	Kailash Kher	4:12
2.	"Ae Ri Mai Re"	Vijay Verma	Ustad Rashid Khan	4:49
3.	"Silent Mode"	Vijay Verma	Mika Singh, Shreya Ghoshal, Rahul Seth	3:23
4.	"Maee Re"	Vijay Verma	Rekha Bhardwaj, Madhushree	4:11
5.	"Joganiya"	Siddhant Madhav	Mamta Sharma, Chhaila Bihari, Siddhant Madhav	4:28
Total length:				21:03

== Reception ==
Rachit Gupta of The Times of India gave the film 2/5 stars, calling it a "Jaded Action Movie with Over-The-Top Stunts. Jansatta online gave the movie 3.5/5 stars and wrote "Neil has tried to do full justice to his role and at the same time he is seen doing tremendous action". Devesh Sharma of Filmfare gave the movie 3.3/5 stars and wrote "Director Manish Vatsalya, who has also acted in the film as Shankar, Govind Namdev’s chief henchman, needs to go back to the drawing board before attempting something like this ever again...". Bangalore Mirror gave the movie 1.5/5 stars and wrote " Neil Nitin Mukesh and Tina Desai's film aspires in vain to be a Rohit Shetty blockbuster".
