= Showbiz (film) =

- A poster of Showbiz
- Directed by: Raju Khan
- Written by: Raju Khan; Shagufta Rafiqe; Mudassar Aziz
- Screenplay by: Raju Khan
- Story by: Raju Khan; Mudassar Aziz
- Produced by: Mukesh Bhatt
- Starring: Tushar Jalota; Mrinalini Sharma; Sushant Singh; Gulshan Grover; Saurabh Shukla; Delnaaz Irani; Sachin Khedekar
- Music by: Lalit Pandit
- Production company: Vishesh Films
- Release date: 28 December 2007
- Running time: 107 minutes
- Country: India
- Language: Hindi

Showbiz is a 2007 Indian Hindi-language romantic drama-musical film directed by Raju Khan. It stars Tushar Jalota, Mrinalini Sharma, Gulshan Grover, and Sushant Singh. The music was scored by Lalit Pandit, of Jatin–Lalit fame.

Khan, the son of veteran choreographer Saroj Khan had a falling out with Mahesh Bhat and walked out of directing the film mid-way. Vishesh Films regular Mohit Suri stepped in to finish filming the remainder.

It was the debut movie of Tushar Jalota.

== Plot ==
The movie revolves around the journey of a budding artist Rohan Arya trying to make a mark in the Hindi music industry and his brushes with the ups and downs of fame and media which is after him and his personal life.

== Soundtrack ==
The music was composed by Lalit Pandit of Jatin–Lalit fame. It consisted of 7 tracks and was released by T-Series on 23 November 2007.

=== Track listing ===
Song name - Performed by - Length

1. Tu Mujhse Jab Se Mila Hai - KK - 4:30
2. Mere Falak Ka Tu Hi Sitara - KK - 5:42
3. Kash Ek Din Aisa Bhi Aaye - Shaan, Shreya Ghoshal - 4:34
4. Duniya Ne Dil Toda - KK - 4:04
5. Tu Mujhse Jab Se Mila Hai (Rap By Earl) - KK (Remix by DJ Suketu) - 4:35
6. Meri Ibtada - Shreya Ghoshal 1:28
7. Mere falak Ka Tu Hi Sitara (Unplugged) - KK - 4:38
