= 3G (film) =

2013 Indian Hindi film by Rahul Dutta

3G: A Killer Connection
- Theatrical release poster
- Directed by: Shantanu Ray Chhibber; Sheershak Anand
- Written by: Shantanu Ray Chhibber; Sheershak Anand; Sumit Saxena (dialogues)
- Produced by: Sunil Lulla; Viki Rajani
- Starring: Neil Nitin Mukesh; Sonal Chauhan
- Cinematography: Keiko Nakahara
- Edited by: Sanjay Sharma
- Music by: Songs: Mithoon; Score: Amar Mohile
- Production companies: Eros International; Next Gen Films
- Distributed by: Eros International
- Release date: 15 March 2013
- Running time: 125 minutes
- Country: India
- Language: Hindi
- Box office: ₹59.1 million (US$610,000)

3G: A Killer Connection is a 2013 Indian Hindi-language horror thriller film directed by Sheershak Anand and Shantanu Ray Chhibber. The film stars Neil Nitin Mukesh and Sonal Chauhan in the lead roles. It was released in India on 15 March 2013.

== Premise ==
While on holiday in Fiji, Sam loses his phone in excitement to meet his girlfriend Sheena. Sam purchases a new phone with a 3G connection, where he starts getting calls from an unknown number, receiving which shows video of a female being killed and her haunted face. Sam starts to lose his mind and also attacks Sheena while being possessed. When she finds out about the unknown caller and the video, they both try to solve the mystery, and they must face the unbelievable reality that the phone is somehow responsible for all that is happening to them and around them.

The only way to stay alive, it seems, is to unravel the mystery of the phone. But as the hours burn on, that becomes harder and harder to do.

== Cast ==
- Neil Nitin Mukesh as Sameer "Sam" Arora
- Sonal Chauhan as Sheena
- Mrinalini Sharma as Chaima
- Asheesh Kapur as Mong Hayward
- Shantanu Ray Chibber as Father Patterson

== Reception ==
3G has received mixed to negative response from critics. Ankur Pathak from Rediff.com rated the film 1.5/5 stars, writing, "Watch 3G only for a few cheap thrills." Swati Deogire of in.com gave the film 2.5 stars, saying "3G is strictly OK and is more of a travel brochure for Fiji." Taran Adarsh from Bollywood Hungama rated the film two out of five and added, "3G doesn't work despite potential in its premise".

== Soundtrack ==
The soundtrack of the film is composed by Mithoon and lyrics are penned by Mithoon, Shellee, Sonu Kakkar . A single track called "Kaise Bataaoon" which is sung by KK & Sonal Chauhan was released on 15 February 2013. Arijit Singh also sang in the movie. The music album was released by Eros Now Music until 2023 when Sony Music India bought the rights to the music album. Musicperk.com rated the album 7.5/10

=== Track listing ===
No.	Title	Music	Singer(s)	Length
1.	"Kaise Bataaoon"	Mithoon	KK, Sonal Chauhan	4:43
2.	"Khalbali"	Mithoon	Arijit Singh, Shilpa Rao, Tochi Raina	5:20
3.	"Bulbulliya"	Mithoon	Adnan Sami	5:58
4.	"Kaise Bataaoon" (Cantabile)	Mithoon	Abhishek Nailwal	4:54
5.	"Khalbali" (Punjabi)	Mithoon	Tochi Raina	5:41
6.	"3G" (Theme)	Mithoon	Instrumental	2:12
