= Table No. 21 =

2013 Indian film by Aditya Datt

- Theatrical release poster
- Directed by: Aditya Datt
- Screenplay by: Shantanu Ray Chhibber; Sheershak Anand
- Story by: Shantanu Ray Chhibber; Sheershak Anand
- Produced by: Sunil Lulla; Viki Rajani
- Starring: Paresh Rawal; Rajeev Khandelwal; Tina Desai
- Cinematography: Ravi Walia
- Edited by: Devendra Murdeshwar
- Music by: Songs: Gajendra Verma; Neeraj Shridhar; Sachin Gupta; Score: Amar Mohile
- Production company: Next Gen Films
- Distributed by: Eros International
- Release date: 4 January 2013
- Running time: 108 minutes
- Country: India
- Language: Hindi
- Budget: ₹8.5 crore
- Box office: ₹17.72 crore

Table No. 21 is a 2013 Indian Hindi-language thriller film directed by Aditya Datt and produced by Eros International. It is named after Article 21 of the Indian Constitution, which talks about the protection of life and personal liberty. The film features Paresh Rawal, Rajeev Khandelwal and Tina Desai and touches upon the pertinent social issue of ragging. The film's soundtrack was composed by Gajendra Verma, Neeraj Shridhar and Sachin Gupta.

== Plot ==
Vivaan Agasthi is married to his college sweetheart, Siya, and the couple struggles to make ends meet when Vivaan loses his job. Around their 5th anniversary, they win a trip to Fiji in a lucky draw. The holiday is fully sponsored, with luxurious hotel accommodations and fine dinners.

At the resort, Vivaan and Siya encounter the charming Mr. Khan, who invites them to participate in his live game show, Table No. 21. He tells them that the winner of the game bags a staggering ₹21 crore in prize money. Eight personal questions will be asked that must be answered truthfully, and following each, one must complete a task related to the question. Lie detectors are attached to their wrists, for which Mr. Khan lets the couple know that if they lie, they die.

After some thought, the couple decides to enter the game show. At first, the questions seem easy, but as the game progresses, the tasks become increasingly uncomfortable and horrific. Many murky details emerge, such as Vivaan slapping Siya for having had an abortion without his consent, and Siya sleeping with her boss to keep her job.

Vivaan's final task is to murder an individual. He is led to a room, where he is to face his target. When he sees the person he must kill, he recognizes him from his past. A flashback shows Vivaan, Siya and their friends in college ragging an underclassman named Akram. The ordeals that Vivaan and Siya had suffered were based on the same ordeals that they inflicted on Akram - public humiliation, forcing him to eat non-vegetarian food, dousing him in blood, etc. The severe bullying compelled Akram to approach the principal, but Vivaan and his friends captured Akram before he could react, stripped him naked and shaved his head while filming the act. This humiliation caused Akram to become mentally challenged.

Back in the present, it is revealed that Akram is Mr. Khan's son and that Mr. Khan's intention was to exact retribution from Vivaan and Siya for reducing his son to an empty shell. Mr. Khan tells them that they are free to go, but their sins will follow them everywhere. The movie ends as Vivaan and Siya are still shocked – crying and regretting their choices.

== Cast ==
- Paresh Rawal as Abdul Razaq Khan aka Mr. Khan
- Rajeev Khandelwal as Vivaan Agasthi
- Tina Desai as Siya Agasthi
- Sana Amin Sheikh as Neeti
- Asheesh Kapur as Bittoo
- Dhruv Ganesh as Akram Khan, Khan's son
- Hanif Hilal as Ghouse, Khan's bodyguard
- Seema Sheoran actress in Mann Mera song
- Manjunath Gaddi as a Chotu

== Soundtrack ==
Song title	Singer	Length
"If You Lie You Die"	Neeraj Shridhar, Jaspreet Jasz	04:01
'Mann Mera' (Remix)	Gajendra Verma	03:19
'Mann Mera'	Gajendra Verma	02:43
'O Sajna' (Remix)	Gajendra Verma, Puja Thaker	02:47
'O Sajna'	Gajendra Verma, Puja Thaker	04:59

== Reception ==
=== Critical response ===
Critics praised the story but criticized the way the issue of ragging is kept under wraps. Ankur Pathak of Rediff.com said that "Table No. 21 should be watched for the reactive social commentary that it is and should not be misconceived as a vigilante film", and rated it 3 out of 5 stars. Madhureeta Mukherjee of The Times of India rated the film 3 out of 5 stars.
