= Johnny Gaddaar =

- Directed by: Sriram Raghavan
- Written by: Sriram Raghavan
- Based on: Les Mystifies by Alain Reynaud-Fourton
- Produced by: Manmohan Shetty
- Starring: Dharmendra; Neil Nitin Mukesh; Rimi Sen; Vinay Pathak; Zakir Hussain; Dayanand Shetty; Ashwini Kalsekar; Govind Namdeo
- Cinematography: C. K. Muraleedharan
- Edited by: Pooja Ladha Surti
- Music by: Score: Daniel B. George; Songs: Shankar–Ehsaan–Loy
- Production company: Adlabs
- Distributed by: Adlabs
- Release date: 28 September 2007
- Running time: 135 minutes
- Country: India
- Language: Hindi
- Budget: ₹7.50 crore
- Box office: ₹5.68 crore

Johnny Gaddaar (transl. Johnny the Traitor) is a 2007 Indian Hindi-language neo-noir crime thriller film written and directed by Sriram Raghavan, produced under the banner Adlabs. It stars Dharmendra, alongside Neil Nitin Mukesh, in his film debut, Zakir Hussain, Rimi Sen, Vinay Pathak, Govind Namdeo, Dayanand Shetty and Ashwini Kalsekar. The film received critical acclaim and was a sleeper hit at the box-office. It was remade in Malayalam as Unnam, in Telugu as Kamina and in Tamil as Johnny.

The film was later identified as an uncredited adaptation of the 1962 French novel Les Mystifies by Alain Reynaud Fourton, which was first adapted into the 1963 French film Symphony for a Massacre by Jacques Deray. In 2018, Raghavan confessed to having read the novel while he was working at ISRO on public safety announcement films.

== Plot ==
The film starts on a rainy night with a conversation between four cops in a police van, patrolling the streets of Mumbai. A car narrowly misses, colliding into them on the road, brakes, and then continues on towards a house with iron gates. A man in a jacket gets out of the car, heads towards the garage, and opens the roller shutter door when he is shot from behind multiple times. At the same time, the cops in the van receive an alert on the radio that gunshots have been heard somewhere in the vicinity, and they ask the driver to head towards the location of the gunshots.

The entire movie is then shown as a flashback, building up to the present shooting and scene of the cops in the van.

The story is about a gang of five that run a gambling club and conduct other underhand deals. The five members are Vikram, Seshadri, Shardul, Prakash, and Shiva. When one of Seshadri's police contacts from Bengaluru, Kalyan, informs him on the phone about "French furniture" (code word for drugs) worth Rs. 5 crore that he can offer him for Rs. 2.5 crore, Seshadri calls for all five members to contribute Rs. 50 lakhs each to set the deal in motion. Based on Shardul's promise of being able to sell the furniture for more than Rs. 5 crore, each member anticipates a profit of a further Rs. 50 lakhs each, at least.

They agree that Shiva is to take the money to Bengaluru by train, meet Kalyan, make the exchange, and return on the same train. Vikram, who is dating Shardul's wife Mini and desperately wants to emigrate to Canada with her, plans to steal the money from Shiva in the train by using chloroform to make him unconscious. In the pretext of going to Goa for business work, he goes about his plot, driving to Pune (where he uses the name Johnny G to check into a hotel), then takes a flight to Goa. In Goa, he meets advocate Gomes, who is Seshadri's friend, to get his work done and to serve as an alibi later, if required. He makes sure the work is half done, flies back to Mumbai, and checks in to a hotel before boarding the train that Shiva takes, the train to Bengaluru en route to Pune. But plans go wrong, and Vikram ends up killing Shiva, who unmasks him before going unconscious. Now Sheshadri, Kalyan, Prakash, and Shardul, one-by-one, find out Vikram's truth and are killed by him in cold blood. Prakash's wife mistakes Vikram for Shardul and kills him, thinking that Shradul had killed Prakash. The story ends in a cliffhanger, and we do not know who gets the money.

== Cast ==
- Dharmendra as Sheshadri 'Seshu'
- Neil Nitin Mukesh as Vikram / Johnny G
- Rimi Sen as Mini (Vikram's Girlfriend and Shardul's Wife)
- Zakir Hussain as Shardul
- Vinay Pathak as Prakash 'Pakiya'
- Ashwini Kalsekar as Varsha (Prakash's wife)
- Dayanand Shetty as Shiva
- Govind Namdeo as Inspector Kalyan
- Vyjayanthi as Nurse Vaijanti
- Rasika Joshi as Shiva's mother
- Shankar Sachdev as Naidu

== Analysis ==
Raghavan has described the film as a suspense caper where the audience knows right from the outset what transpires and who the likely culprit is. The opening credits dedicate the film to the Indian director Vijay Anand and writer James Hadley Chase. The film is a tribute to Vijay Anand's influence on the Hindi noir/thriller genre. It pays tribute to him in a scene in which, the receptionist is seen watching Vijay Anand's film Johnny Mera Naam, starring Dev Anand, at the lobby of a hotel room.

The colour Red is used predominantly in the film, as a homage to Sin City. Raghavan himself had confessed wanting to shoot the whole film in black and white.

The film shares similarities with the Stanley Kubrick's film noir classic The Killing, which includes the plot elements like the ex-conman character, the cheating wife and no-one escape climax, but the only stark difference is that Kubrick's Johnny isn't the gaddar (transl. the traitor).

== Soundtrack ==
Johnny Gaddaar

Soundtrack album by Shankar–Ehsaan–Loy
- Released: 25 August 2007
- Genre: Feature film soundtrack
- Length: 61:11
- Languages: Hindi; Tamil; Telugu
- Label: T-Series
- Producers: Shankar–Ehsaan–Loy; Adlabs

Shankar–Ehsaan–Loy chronology
Salaam-e-Ishq: A Tribute To Love (2007)	Johnny Gaddaar (2007)	Heyy Babyy (2007)

The film has fifteen songs and two remixes composed by Shankar–Ehsaan–Loy for the soundtrack and Daniel B George for the score, with lyrics by Jaideep Sahni. The album was met with high critical acclaim upon its release. The soundtrack was co-produced by composers Shankar–Ehsaan–Loy and Adlabs, which is first of its kind in the history of Bollywood. The album was released on 13 September 2007 at IMAX, Wadala, Mumbai. Shankar–Ehsaan–Loy, Dharmendra, Neil Nitin Mukesh and Sriram Raghavan were present at the launch among others.

Director Sriram Raghavan approached the trio to score a single for the film. As they were discussing, Ehsaan came up with a riff which Sriram felt fitted the theme of the movie and was used as the title song "Johnny Gaddaar". Sriram wanted the second song to have an early '70s club feel, along the lines of the famous R.D. Burman song, "Duniya Main", which led to the rich and vibrant "Dhoka". Sriram had seen rapper Hard Kaur performing on television, and after jamming together, they came up with the final song of the album, "Move Your Body". The album includes Tamil and Telugu versions of the tracks "Johnny Gaddaar" and "Move Your Body".

Tracklist
No.	Title	Singer(s)	Length
1.	"Johnny Gaddaar"	Suraj Jagan, Akriti Kakkar	04:59
2.	"Move Your Body"	Shankar Mahadevan, Ehsaan Noorani, Loy Mendonsa, Hard Kaur	03:33
3.	"Dhoka"	Anousha Mani, Shankar Mahadevan, Loy Mendonsa	04:10
4.	"Johnny in the House"	Dj. Shane	06:45
5.	"Move Your Body (Phatt Mix)"	Shankar Mahadevan, Ehsaan Noorani, Loy Mendonsa, Hard Kaur	04:28
6.	"Johnny Breakbeat Mera Naam"	Gulraj Singh	03:29
7.	"Revenge of the 70s"	Instrumental	02:25
8.	"The Caper Begins"	Sukhwinder Singh, Shilpa Rao	04:14
9.	"Toss"	Instrumental	01:11
10.	"Confidence"	Instrumental	02:05
11.	"Bhule Bisre Geet"	Sabiha Khan, Geetanjali, Swanand Kirkire	06:01
12.	"Johnny Gaddaar (Tamil)"	Raman Mahadevan, Nandini Srikar	04:59
13.	"Move Your Body (Tamil)"	Shankar Mahadevan, Ehsaan Noorani, Loy Mendonsa, Hard Kaur	03:33
14.	"Johnny Gaddaar (Telugu)"	Nandini Srikar, Raman Mahadevan	04:59
15.	"Move Your Body (Telugu)"	Shankar Mahadevan, Raman Mahadevan, Nandini Srikar, Mani Mahadevan	03:31
Total length:			61:11

=== Reception ===
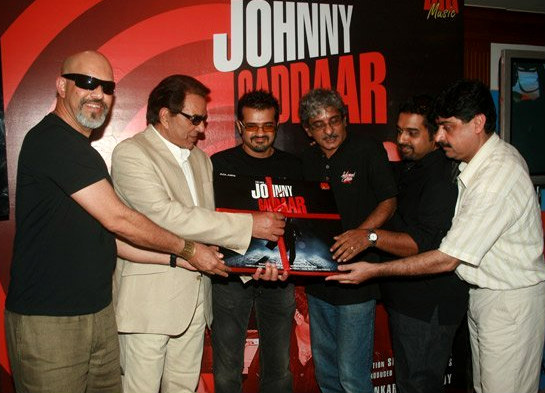
SEL, Dharmendra, Sriram Raghavan at the music launch

Professional ratings
Review scores
Source	Rating
Bollywood Hungama	3.5/5 stars
Rediff.com	4.5/5 stars

The album was met with high praise from critics upon release. Raja Sen of Rediff.com, who awarded the soundtrack four and a half stars was ecstatic about the soundtrack, "Johnny Gaddaar is a delightfully harebrained work showing off extreme musical maturity. This is the soundtrack that breaks all the rules, the three buddies revelling in the recklessness director Sriram Raghavan gives them. This is what Modesty Blaise would dance to, an album of lunatic retro genius.". Joginder Tuteja of Bollywood Hungama gave the album a three-and-a-half stars, stating, "In 'Johnny Gaddaar', don't even expect the kind of soundtrack that you hear in a conventional Bollywood film. Instead expect to get on a rhythmic ride which would hardly give you a breather throughout its 11 tracks. The music of 'Johnny Gaddaar' isn't anything that you have heard before in a mainstream Hindi film before. And this is where its strength lies!".

The soundtrack featured in the "Top 10 Music Albums of the Year" list by Rediff, which said "Shankar, Ehsaan and Loy get it right again with twisted, unorthodox productions like Johnny Gaddaar".

== Awards and nominations ==
=== Filmfare Awards ===
Winner

- 2008: Filmfare Award for Best Sound Design; Leslie Fernandes

=== Star Screen Awards ===
Nominated

- 2008: Star Screen Award for Most Promising Newcomer - Male; Neil Nitin Mukesh

=== Stardust Awards ===
Nominated

- 2008: Stardust Superstar of Tomorrow - Male; Neil Nitin Mukesh
- 2008: Stardust Award for New Musical Sensation – Female – Hard Kaur for the song "Move Your Body"
- 2008: Stardust Award for New Musical Sensation – Female – Akriti Kakkar for the song "Johnny Gadaar"

=== IIFA Awards ===
Winner

- 2008: Fresh Face of the Year; Neil Nitin Mukesh

=== Star Guild Awards ===
Winner

- 2008: Best Actor in a Negative Role; Neil Nitin Mukesh

=== Zee Cine Awards ===
Winner

- 2008: Special Award; Neil Nitin Mukesh

=== Apsara Film and Television Producers Guild Awards ===
Winner

- 2008: Best Performance in a negative role; Neil Nitin Mukesh
