= Bajatey Raho =

2013 Hindi film by Shashant A Shah

- Theatrical poster
- Directed by: Shashant Shah
- Screenplay by: Zafar A Khan; Akshay Verma (dialogue)
- Story by: Zafar A Khan
- Produced by: Krishika Lulla
- Starring: Tusshar Kapoor; Dolly Ahluwalia; Ranvir Shorey; Ravi Kishan; Vinay Pathak; Vishakha Singh
- Cinematography: Arun Varma
- Edited by: Aseem Sinha
- Music by: Jaidev Kumar
- Production companies: Eros International; MSM Motion Pictures
- Distributed by: Eros International
- Release date: 26 July 2013
- Running time: 107 min
- Country: India
- Language: Hindi

Bajatey Raho (transl. Keep playing) is a 2013 Indian Hindi-language comedy film directed by Shashant Shah and produced by Krishika Lulla. The film stars Tusshar Kapoor, Dolly Ahluwalia, Ranvir Shorey, Vinay Pathak and Vishakha Singh. In the film, a bunch of unlikely avengers get into the act and con wealthy but fraudulent businessmen.

Bajatey Raho is director Shah's third film, after Dasvidaniya (2008) and Chalo Dilli (2011), both of which starred Pathak in the lead. The film was released on 26 July 2013 to mixed reviews from critics.

== Plot ==
The movie begins with Sukhmeet (Sukhi) (Tusshar Kapoor) applying for admission for his son, Kabootar, to a school. However, Principal Sethi (Rammakant Daayama) refuses to do so as Sukhi's son both has bad grades and is playing with a PSP even during the interview. But, to get admission, Sukhi bribes Principal Sethi, to which he gives positive responses. But, when Suki moves his tie sideways, Principal Sethi can see the attached transmitter. It is revealed that Ballu (Ranvir Shorey) and Sukhi were conducting a sting operation on the principal and that the PSP Kabootar was holding was in reality a camera recording the whole interview in high definition. Sukhi threatens to hand the recording right to the media, and if Principal Sethi wanted to happen otherwise, he was to pay the amount of 3 crores to Sukhi and Ballu.

As per their instructions, Sethi keeps the suitcase with money in the decided area and goes to collect the PSP. However, he is horrified to find a movie clip on the PSP, implying that they had fooled him and that they were going to publish the disreputable recording anyway. But, when he rushes to take the suitcase, a police car pulls over, and police officer Mintu Hasan (Vinay Pathak) takes the suitcase, saying that it was one of the many suitcases in the area that were bearing bombs.

Shortly after, it is revealed that Mintu was a dupe police officer and that he is in cahoots with Sukhi and Ballu. Then, a flashback is shown, revealing that Sukhi's father, Mr. Baweja (Yogendra Tikku), was an honest man working at a bank, and his wicked boss, Mohanlal Sabharwal (Ravi Kishan), had swindled 15 crores from innocent people and framed Mr. Baweja and his assistant, Saira, for it. Mr. Baweja had died of cardiac arrest, meanwhile Saira, who was also Mintu's wife, was imprisoned. As such, Sukhi and his family were ordered by the court to pay the investors their money back. It is also revealed that the school they had looted was owned by Sabharwal.

According to their next strategy, Mrs. Baweja and Mintu dress as food inspectors and barge into Sabharwal's milk factory, which, as they had recently found out, supplied adulterated and ingenuine products. Using this excuse, along with high complexity, they arrive at Sabharwal's friend's house, from where they try to steal the fridge, which they knew to be filled with the same 15 crores, but resort to just leaving the refrigerator and running away on the sudden and unanticipated arrival of Sabharwal.

As per their last plan, Sukhi's girlfriend Manpreet (Vishakha Singh), posing as a dance trainer, goes to Sabbarwahl's house to spy on him. They soon come to know that Sabbarwahl, busy preparing for his daughter's wedding, has promised to pay 15 crore to her in-laws, the Kapoors. Meanwhile, Mummyji and Mintoo, disguised as Hansal builders, instigate the Kapoors against Sabbarwahl. Finally, on the wedding night, Sukhi and Ballu dressed as caterers sneak into Sabbarwahl's farmhouse and hide all the money in gift packs. Sabbarwahl unknowingly distributes all the money hidden in gift boxes to guests who were actually the investors. Knowing the truth about Sukhi and the group, Sabbarwahl attacks them with a gun, only to be confronted by his own daughter. Sabbarwahl confesses to his crime and is later jailed for seven years, which completes the revenge of the Baweja family.

== Cast ==
- Tusshar Kapoor as Sukhwinder Baweja (Sukhi)
- Dolly Ahluwalia as Jasbeer Baweja (Mummyji/Mrs. Hansal Mehta)
- Ranvir Shorey as Balwant Hasija (Ballu)
- Vinay Pathak as Mintoo Hasan
- Vishakha Singh as Manpreet Chaddha
- Ravi Kishan as Mohanlal Sabharwal
- Anya Singh as Gudiya Sabharwal
- Kamlesh Gill as Naniji
- Rammakant Daayama as Principal Asharam Sethi
- Husaan Saad as Kabootar
- Rajinder Nanu as Raman Sony
- Vikas Mohla as Pawan Sony
- Nikhil Pandey as Aman "Beta ji"Kapoor
- Neyha Sharma as Aman's Friend
- Svetlana Manolyo as Jeni Watson
- Brijendra Kala as Tasvir Singh Bagga
- Yogendra Tikku as Jagatpal Baweja
- Sunil Chitkara as Inspector Dayanand Parihar
- Maryam Zakaria as item number "Nagin Dance"
- Scarlett Mellish Wilson as item number "Nagin Dance"

== Soundtrack ==
Bajatey Raho

Soundtrack album by Jaidev Kumar
- Released: 17 June 2013
- Recorded: 2012–2013
- Genre: Film soundtrack
- Length: 28:22
- Label: T-Series Eros Music

No.	Title	Singer(s)	Length
1.	"Main Nagin Dance"	Anmol Malik	03:43
2.	"Khurafati Akhiyan"	Sona Mohapatra	04:03
3.	"Kudi Tu Butter"	Yo Yo Honey Singh	03:40
4.	"Bajatey Raho"	RDB	04:12
5.	"Kudi Tu Butter" (Reprise)	Gajendra Verma	03:54
6.	"Main Nagin Dance" (Remix)	Anmol Malik	03:23

== Filming ==
The film was shot in Delhi in February and March 2013, including a schedule in the Chhattarpur area of the city and pathways world school of aravali
