= Aa Dekhen Zara =

- Theatrical release poster
- Directed by: Jehangir Surti
- Screenplay by: Sheershak Anand; Shantanu Ray Chhibber
- Story by: Sheershak Anand; Shantanu Ray Chhibber
- Produced by: Viki Rajani
- Starring: Bipasha Basu; Neil Nitin Mukesh; Rahul Dev; Sophie Choudry
- Cinematography: Jehangir Choudhary
- Edited by: Bunty Nagi
- Music by: Pritam Chakraborty
- Production company: Next Gen Films
- Distributed by: Eros International
- Release date: 27 March 2009
- Running time: 117 minutes
- Country: India
- Language: Hindi
- Budget: ₹170 million
- Box office: ₹103.8 million

Aa Dekhen Zara (Come, Let's See) is a 2009 Indian Hindi-language science fiction thriller film written by Sheershak Anand, starring Neil Nitin Mukesh, who plays a photo journalist, and Bipasha Basu, as a disc jockey. The film is the directorial debut of Jehangir Surti.

ASTPL, an Indian software developer, also released Aa Dekhen Zara Jigsaw – a jigsaw puzzle mobile video game based on the film.

== Plot ==
Ray Acharya (Neil Nitin Mukesh), a struggling photographer, has nothing going for him. He inherits a special camera from his grandfather, who was a scientist. His life then changes in a way that he could not have imagined in his wildest dreams.

The photographs produced by the camera predict the future. Ray uses the camera to obtain winning lottery numbers, winning horses, and also stock prices. His life becomes one big roller coaster ride that takes him from rags to riches and also helps him meet the love of his life, Simi (Bipasha Basu), a DJ with a mind of her own.

However, Captain (Rahul Dev) finds out and chases Ray to get the camera for himself. Security authorities also chase Ray as they are aware that Ray's grandfather was trying to create a camera that can predict the future. The chase leads them to Bangkok, where the climax unfolds.

== Cast ==
Actor	Role
Neil Nitin Mukesh	Ray Acharya
Bipasha Basu	Simi Chatterjee
Rahul Dev	Captain
Sophie Choudry	Bindiya Avasti
Rajan Korgaonkar	Recovery Agent
Ashwin Nayak	Bike Rider
Bobby Vatsa	Inspector Puri

== Production ==
It was initially known as Freeze. But in an interview, Vikram Rajani, the executive director of Eros International, said, "What is Freeze? The movie was always called Aa Dekhen Zara. I do not know how people called the movie Freeze. That was just a working title we had in mind. We have the title Aa Dekhen Zara registered long time back".

Bipasha Basu performed opposite Neil Mukesh for the first time with this film. Recent reports say that Neil convinced Bipasha to sing with him the title track, "Aa Dekhe Zara". Stylist Rakhi Parekh Patil worked on Bipasha Basu's look for the movie.

== Box office ==
The film did moderate business because of a feud between multiplexes owners and the producers. It had an average opening in the first week. The collections started to drop in the second week because of other films with similar themes releasing at the same time (8 x 10 Tasveer, Kal Kissne Dekha). The movie grossed Rs 52,500,000 worldwide. The film was declared an average grosser.

== Music ==
Aa Dekhen Zara

Soundtrack album by Pritam and Gaurav Dasgupta
- Released: 15 February 2009 (India)
- Genre: Feature film soundtrack
- Label: Sony Music
- Producer: Eros International

Pritam chronology
Ek: The Power of One (2009)	Aa Dekhen Zara (2009)	New York (2009)

Gaurav Dasgupta chronology
Aa Dekhen Zara (2009)

The song "Aa Dekhen Zara" is a modern-day remix version of the popular dance number "Aa Dekhe Zara" from the Sanjay Dutt and Tina Munim's film Rocky, which was released in 1981. The makers of Aa Dekhen Zara obtained the rights for this original R.D. Burman number and gave the song a modern-day flavor. Gaurav Dasgupta was the man behind this remix number which also supposedly features Bipasha. The song "Paisa Hai Power" is a remake of "The Power" by Snap!.

=== Tracks ===
#	Track	Singer(s)	Composer	Writer
1.	"Gazab"	Sunidhi Chauhan & Shaan	Pritam	Irshad Kamil
2.	"Rock The Party"	Sunidhi Chauhan & Shweta Vijay	Gaurav Dasgupta	Sheershak Anand
3.	"Power"	Dibyendu Mukharjee	Gaurav Dasgupta	Syed Gulrez & Prashant Pandey
4.	"Aa Dekhen Zara" (Lounge Mix)	Dibyendu Mukherji & Shweta Vijay	Gaurav Dasgupta	Sheershak Anand & Anand Bakshi
5.	"Mohabbat Aapse"	Akriti Kakkar	Pritam	Irshad Kamil
6.	"Power" (Club Mix)	Dibyendu Mukharjee	Gaurav Dasgupta	Syed Gulrez & Prashant Pandey
7.	"Gazab" (Club Mix)	Sunidhi Chauhan & Shaan	Pritam	Irshad Kamil
8.	"Aa Dekhen Zara"	Neil Nitin Mukesh & Sunaina	Gaurav Dasgupta	Sheershak Anand & Anand Bakshi
