= Gajendra Verma =

Indian singer-songwriter (born 1990)

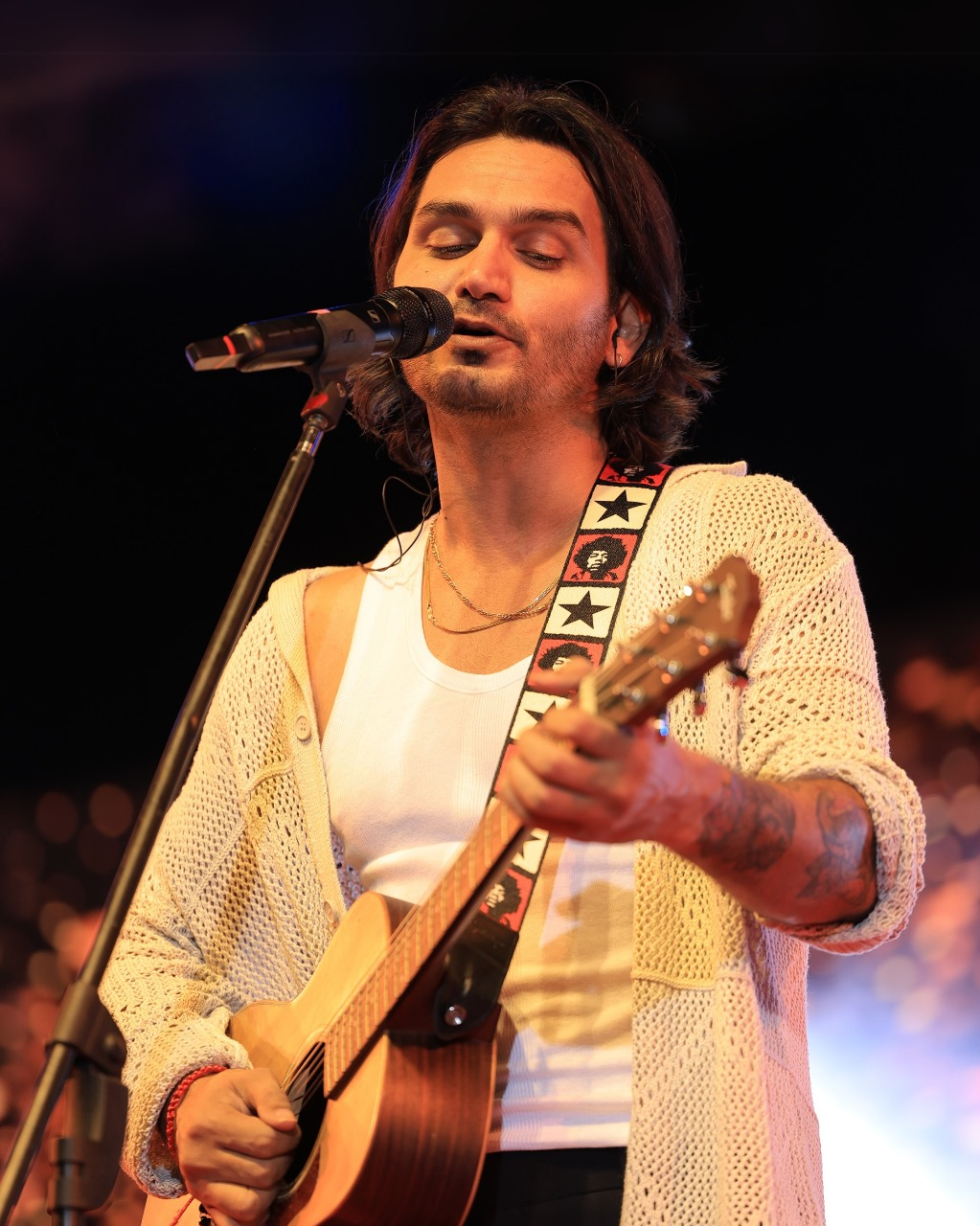
- Gajendra Verma Performing

Background information
- Born: 20 April 1990 (age 36); Sirsa, Haryana, India
- Occupations: Singer; Songwriter
- Years active: 2010–present
- Musical career
- Genres: Pop; R&B; Funk
- Instruments: Vocals; Guitar
- Labels: DroomMuisc; Virtual Planet Music; Eros Now; T-Series; Sonotekk
Gajendra Verma
YouTube information
- Channel: Gajendra Verma
- Years active: 2010–present
- Genre: Music
- Subscribers: 4.2 million
- Views: 2.7 billion
- Website Information
- Website: gajendraverma.com

Gajendra Verma (born 20 April 1990) is an Indian singer, songwriter, composer, and sound engineer, known for his contributions to the Indian pop music industry. His debut single, "Emptiness (Tune Mere Jaana, Originally Rohan Rathod)," gained attention in 2010–11, which helped establish his presence as an independent artist in India. Gajendra has since released several other tracks, including "Phir Suna," "Mann Mera," "Ik Kahani," and "Tera Ghata."

== Early life ==
Gajendra was born in Sirsa, Haryana, and raised in Jaipur, Rajasthan. His father, Surender Verma, is a poet and lyricist, which influenced his early exposure to music and writing. He began performing at the age of four and learned to play instruments such as the harmonium and guitar. Gajendra later pursued sound engineering, enabling him to produce much of his own music. His brother, Vikram Singh, has also been a collaborator and producer in his music career. Gajendra later pursued sound engineering, which allowed him to produce much of his music independently.

== Career ==
=== 2010 ===
Verma's initial breakthrough came with the release of "Emptiness (Tune Mere Jaana)" in 2010. The song, which was associated with a fictional story, became widely circulated online. Following this, he released several tracks, including "Phir Suna," "Mann Mera," and "Ik Kahani."

=== 2012–2017 ===
He started producing independent songs and songs for Bollywood movies. "Phir Suna," "Saajna re", "Tera Hi Rahun" "Mann Mera," and "Ik Kahani" were some of the significant milestones in his career.

=== 2018 ===
Verma released the song "Tera Ghata," which became popular, accumulating a significant number of views on YouTube. The song's theme dealt with moving on after heartbreak, and it resonated with listeners in India and other countries such as Pakistan, Nepal, and the United Arab Emirates.

=== 2021 ===
Verma launched "Summary," a musical web series that combines music with visual storytelling. Each episode featured a song linked to a larger narrative. This project marked a different approach in his career. In 2022, He collaborated with an American Band "Flipsyde" for a single for international markets.

=== 2024 ===
Gajendra released his album "Good Vibes Only" in 2024, featuring eight tracks that blend elements of Pop, R&B, Funk, and Synth Wave. He embarked on a nationwide tour to promote the album, performing in major cities and further cementing his reputation as a versatile artist.

== Discography ==
Year	Song	Version	Film/ Album	Label
2008	Tune Mere Jaana		Emptiness	
2008	Phir Suna		Emptiness	
2008	Love Kiya Toh Darna Kya		Emptiness	
2008	Sun Mere		Single	
2011	Tune Mere Jaana (Emptiness)	Single	Emptiness	Sonotek Cassettes
2011	Phir Suna	Single	Emptiness	Sonotek Cassettes
2011	Tune Mere Jaana Reprise	Single	Emptiness	Sonotek Cassettes
2012	Saajna Re	Single	Saajna Re	Virtual Planet Music
2012	Taur Mittran Di	Film	Taur Mittran Di	Eros Now Music
2013	Mann Mera	Film	Table No. 21	Eros Now Music
2013	O Sajna	Film	Table No. 21	Eros Now Music
2013	Kudi Tu Butter' (Reprise)	Film	Bajatey Raho	Eros Now Music
2013	Tujhse Door Jo Hota Hun	Single	Tujhse Door Jo Hota Hun	Virtual Planet Music
2013	Mujhe Ishq Se	Film	Yaariyan	T-Series
2013	Yaariyan Mashup	Film	Yaariyan	T-Series
2014	Baarish	Film	Yaariyan	T-Series
2014	O Humnavaa	Film	Samrat & Co.	Rajshri Music
2014	Kyun Hai?	Single	Kyun Hai?	Virtual Planet Music
2015	Anjaam	Single	Anjaam	Virtual Planet Music
2015	High High High Higher	Film	Chor Bazari	T-Series
2015	Hai Koi	Film	Chor Bazari	T-Series
2015	Hum Hain Na	Single	Hum Hain Na	Virtual Planet Music
2015	Maa Hai Yaar	Single	Maa Hai Yaar	Virtual Planet Music
2015	Shor	Single	Shor	DKP Music
2016	Kudi Tu Butter (Reprise)	Film	Bajatey Raho	Eros Now Music
2016	Tera Hi Rahun	Single	Tera Hi Rahun	Virtual Planet Music
2017	Ik Kahani	Album	From Lost to Found	Virtual Planet Music
2017	Mera Jahan	Album	From Lost to Found	Virtual Planet Music
2018	Tera Ghata Acoustic	Album	From Lost to Found	Virtual Planet Music
2018	Tera Ghata	Album	From Lost to Found	Virtual Planet Music
2018	Tera Ghata HipHop Version	Album	From Lost to Found	Virtual Planet Music
2018	Tera Ghata Rajasthani Version	Album	From Lost to Found	Virtual Planet Music
2018	Raati Saanu	Album	From Lost to Found	SagaHits
2018	The Mercury Song – Jhankar Beats	Film	Mercury	Saregama India Ltd.
2019	Ja Ja Ja	Album	FLIP	Virtual Planet Music
2019	Ab Aaja	Album	FLIP	Virtual Planet Music
2019	Jaana Jaana	Album	FLIP	Virtual Planet Music
2019	Main Aur Tu	Album	FLIP	Virtual Planet Music
2019	Khelegi Kya	Single	Khelegi Kya	Virtual Planet Music
2019	Milo Na Tum	Single	Milo Na Tum	Virtual Planet Music
2019	Safar	Single	Safar	Virtual Planet Music
2019	Yaad Karke	Single	Yaad Karke	Virtual Planet Music
2020	Tere Nashe Mein Choor	Album	FLIP	Virtual Planet Music
2020	Ab Aaja (Remix)	Album	FLIP	Virtual Planet Music
2020	Ja Ja Ja (Remix)	Album	FLIP	Virtual Planet Music
2020	Main Aur Tu (Remix)	Album	FLIP	Virtual Planet Music
2020	Tere Nashe Mein Choor (Remix)	Album	FLIP	Virtual Planet Music
2020	India Together	Single	India Together	Virtual Planet Music
2020	Mera Desh	Single	Mera Desh	Virtual Planet Music
2020	Yaad Karke (Remix)	Single	Yaad Karke (Remix)	Virtual Planet Music
2021	Fakeer Bandeya	Single	Fakeer Bandeya	Sony Music India
2021	Jugnoo Sitarey	Single	Jugnoo Sitarey	ARCHIT & SMIT
2021	Na Hona Tumse Door	Single	Na Hona Tumse Door	Virtual Planet Music
2021	Aaj Phir Se	Album	Summary	Virtual Planet Music
2021	Pehla Pyar			
2021	Mushkil Badi	Album	Summary	Virtual Planet Music
2021	Kitna Maza Aayega	Album	Summary	Virtual Planet Music
2021	Ratjage	Album	Summary	Virtual Planet Music
2021	Sun Baliye	Single	Sun Baliye	Voila Digi Private Limited
2021	Sun Baliye – Remix Version	Single	Sun Baliye – Remix Version	Voila Digi Private Limited
2021	Sun Baliye (Remix)	Single	Sun Baliye (Remix)	Voila Digi Private Limited
2021	Tera Ishq	Single	Tera Ishq	Voila Digi Private Limited
2021	DNA of Love	Single	DNA of Love	Entourage Music
2022	Hum Se Hai Life	Single	Hum Se Hai Life	Virtual Planet Music
2022	Maar Sutteya	Single	Maar Sutteya	Virtual Planet Music
2022	Maar Sutteya Acapella	Single	Maar Sutteya Acapella	Virtual Planet Music
2022	Milo Na Tum (Lofi)	Film	Milo Na Tum (Lofi)	Saregama India Ltd.
2022	Mann Mera Remix	Film	Table No. 21	Eros Now Music
2022	O Sajna Remix	Film	Table No. 21	Eros Now Music
2022	Mann Mera Lofi	Film	Table No. 21	Eros Now Music
2022	Tera Ishq Lofi Remix	Single	Tera Ishq Lofi Remix	Voila Digi Private Limited
2022	Mann Jaage	Film	Bittu Boss	T-Series
2023	Aaj Phir Se	Album	Summary	Virtual Planet Music
2023	Tera Ghata ft. Neha Kakkar	Single	From Lost to Found	Virtual Planet Music
2023	Tera Ghata Remix	Single	FLIP	Virtual Planet Music
2023	Lag Jaa Gale (from Leela)	Single	FLIP	Voila Digi Private Limited
2023	Adhoore Hum	Single	FLIP	T-Series
2023	Love Kiya To Darna Kya (Sad Version)	Single	FLIP	Virtual Planet Music
2023	Sun Mere	Single	FLIP	Virtual Planet Music
2023	Love Kiya To Darna Kya	Single	Love Kiya To Darna Kya	Virtual Planet Music
2023	Love Mashup	Single	Love Mashup	Virtual Planet Music
2023	Sun Baliye (Lofi Remix)	Single	Sun Baliye (Lofi Remix)	Voila Digi Private Limited
2023	Baarish LoFi Mix	Film	Yaariyan	T-Series
2023	Paheliyan	Single		Times Music
2024	Milo Na Tum (New Age Mix)	Single	Milo Na Tum (New Age Mix)	Saregama India Ltd.
2024	Udantashtari	Single	Good Vibes Only	DroomMusic
2024	Enna Yaad	Album	Good Vibes Only	DroomMusic
2024	Goom Ho Gaya	Album	Good Vibes Only	DroomMusic
2024	Mud Ke Tu Aa	Album	Good Vibes Only	DroomMusic
2024	Jhoom	Album	Good Vibes Only	DroomMusic
2024	Jeene Do	Album	Good Vibes Only	DroomMusic
2024	Sunoh	Album	Good Vibes Only	DroomMusic
2024	Taare Ginke	Album	Good Vibes Only	DroomMusic

== Musical style and influence ==
Gajendra Verma's music blends pop, R&B, and electronic genres with emotional lyrics. His influences include A.R. Rahman, Lucky Ali, and Ed Sheeran. Verma's work is noted for balancing commercial appeal with lyrical depth, which has resonated with a wide audience.
