= Tina Desai =

Indian actress

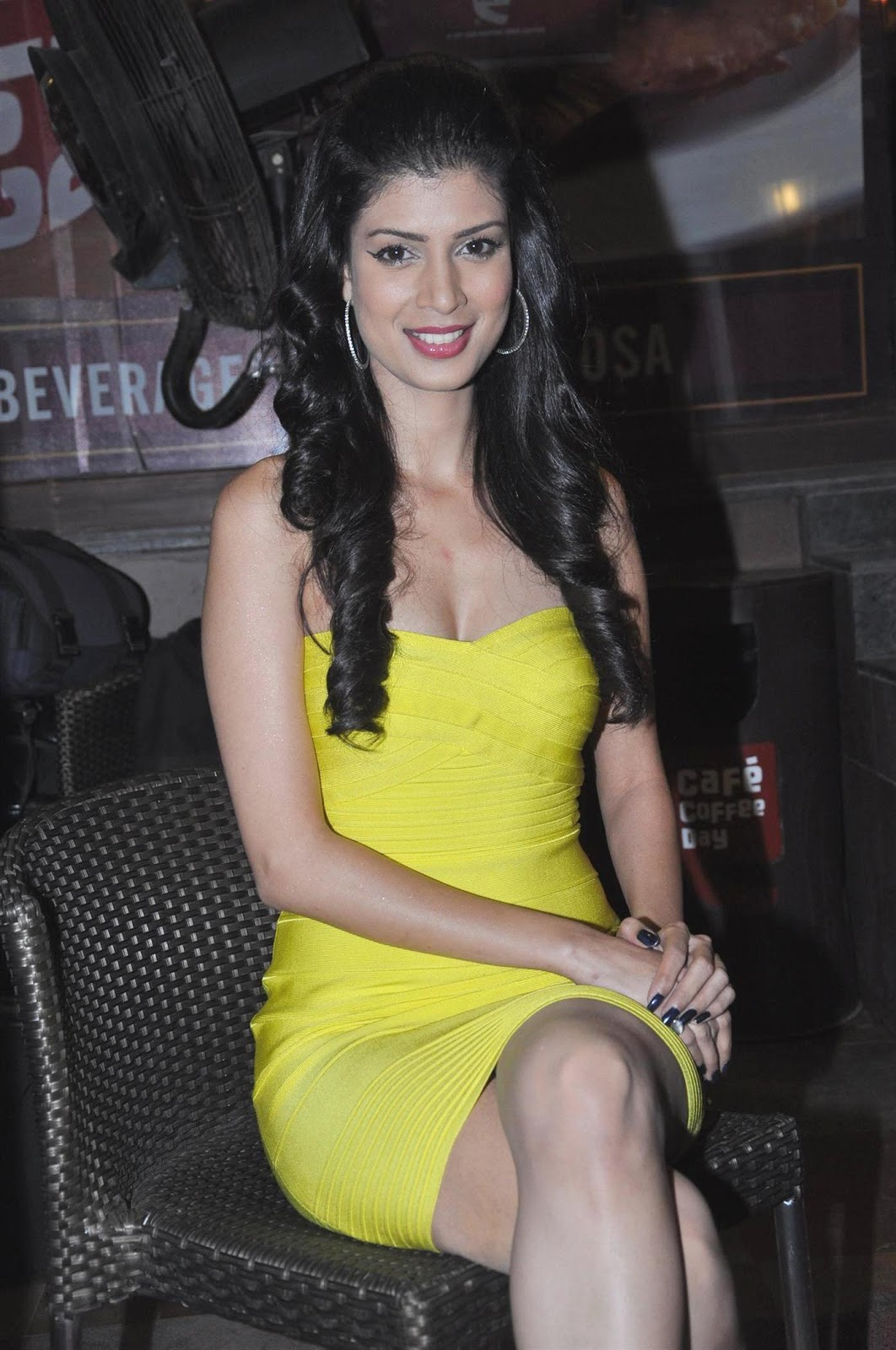
- Desai at the Mumbai Promotion of Table No.21 in 2012
- Born: February 24, 1987 (age 39); Bangalore, Karnataka, India
- Occupations: Actress; model
- Years active: 2011–present

Tina Desai is an Indian actress and model who works in both Indian and international projects. She debuted with the 2011 thriller Yeh Faasley, before making her foreign debut in 2012 in the comedy-drama The Best Exotic Marigold Hotel. She is also known for her main role in the Netflix series Sense8.

== Early life ==
Desai was born in Bangalore to a Gujarati father and a Telugu mother. She is a graduate in business management with a specialization in finance from the NIM. She is fluent in six languages—Gujarati, Telugu, Kannada, English, Hindi and Punjabi.

== Career ==
Desai began her career as a model and went on to feature in over 150 commercials and print campaigns. She participated in the reality show contest Get Gorgeous through which she was offered a contract with Elite Model India Management.

She made her acting debut in 2011 in Yeh Faasley, and shortly after, made her Hollywood debut in the film The Best Exotic Marigold Hotel.

She posed for the 2012 Kingfisher Swimsuit Calendar and starred in the Bollywood action thriller film Table No. 21 opposite Rajeev Khandelwal. She appeared in the romantic song "Yeh Kahan Mil Gaye Hum" with singer KK.

In 2015, Desai booked two high-profile English language projects, The Second Best Exotic Marigold Hotel, a sequel to the 2012 hit and the Netflix drama Sense8 by The Wachowskis and J. Michael Straczynski in which she plays Kala Dandekar.

In 2016, she voiced the character of Ashima in the Thomas & Friends film The Great Race, and 2 years later in 2018, Desai voiced Ashima in some of the episodes of seasons 22, 23 & 24 of Thomas and Friends. In April 2018, Tina played the role of Jenny in a short film titled 'Good luck' for Hotstar, directed by Sujoy Ghosh.

In 2021, Desai starred in the Amazon Prime web series Mumbai Diaries 26/11. Directed by Nikkhil Advani and produced by Emmay Entertainment, it also stars Mohit Raina and Konkona Sen Sharma. Desai then appeared in crime thriller film Bob Biswas directed by Diya Annapurna Ghosh.

== Filmography ==
=== Film ===
| Year | Film | Role | Language | Notes |
|---|---|---|---|---|
| 2011 | Yeh Faasley | Arunima D. Dua | Hindi | |
| 2011 | Sahi Dhandhe Galat Bande | Neha Sharma | Hindi | |
| 2012 | Cocktail | Waitress | Hindi | Cameo |
| 2012 | The Best Exotic Marigold Hotel | Sunaina | English | |
| 2013 | Table No.21 | Siya Agasthi | Hindi | |
| 2015 | The Second Best Exotic Marigold Hotel | Sunaina | English | |
| 2015 | Sharafat Gayi Tel Lene | Megha | Hindi | |
| 2016 | Thomas & Friends: The Great Race | Ashima | English | Voice |
| 2018 | Dassehra | Aditi Singh | Hindi | |
| 2018 | Good luck | Jenny Saxena | Hindi | Short film |
| 2021 | Bob Biswas | Indira Verma | Hindi | |
| 2026 | Bhai Tera Star Hai | Chandani | Hindi | |

=== Television ===
| Year | Film | Role | Language | Notes |
|---|---|---|---|---|
| 2015–2018 | Sense8 | Kala Dandekar | English | Original Netflix Series |
| 2018-2020 | Thomas and Friends | Ashima (voice) | English | 6 episodes |
| 2021 | Mumbai diaries - 26/11 | Ananya Ghosh | Hindi | Original Web Series |
| 2022 | Bloody Brothers | Sophie | Hindi | |
