= Sheershak Anand =

Indian Producer & Director by profession

- Occupation: Film Director
- Years active: 2008–present

Sheershak Anand is an Indian film producer and director.

== Filmography ==
Year	Film	Role
2015	Guddu Ki Gun	Director, Writer
2013	3G - A Killer Connection	Director, Writer, ScreenPlay
2013	Table No. 21	Writer, Screenplay
2009	Aa Dekhen Zara	Writer, Screenplay, dialogue Writer
