= List of Hindi films of 2015 =

This is a list of Bollywood films that were released in 2015.

The highest-grossing Bollywood film of 2015 was Bajrangi Bhaijaan, which was the second-highest-grossing Bollywood film ever at the time.

== Box office collection ==
Rank	Title	Gross	Ref.
1	Bajrangi Bhaijaan	₹920.9 crore (US$141 million)	(Note: Bajrangi Bhaijaan worldwide gross: India – ₹444.92 crore; Overseas – ₹488.16 crore)
2	Prem Ratan Dhan Payo	₹432 crore (US$64 million)	(Note: Dilwale worldwide gross: ₹408.15 crore (US$42 million): Domestic: ₹214.15 crore (US$22 million); Overseas: US$30.2 million (₹194 crore))
3	Dilwale	₹376 crore (US$67 million)	
4	Bajirao Mastani	₹356.2 crore (US$56 million)	
5	Tanu Weds Manu: Returns	₹243.6 crore (US$38 million)	
6	Welcome Back	₹168.76 crore (US$26 million)	
7	ABCD 2	₹158.31 crore (US$25 million)	
8	Drishyam	₹147 crore (US$23 million)	
9	Dil Dhadakne Do	₹145 crore (US$23 million)	
10	Baby	₹142.98 crore (US$22 million)	

== January–March ==
Opening		Title	Director	Cast	Genre	Studio	Source
J A N	2	International Hero	Sanjay Niranjan	Nakul Vaid, Jatin Grewal, Gurleen Choter	Drama		
J A N	2	Mumbai Can Dance Saala	Sachindra Sharma	Ashima Sharma, Prashant Narayanan, Aditya Pancholi, Mukesh Tiwari	Thriller		
J A N	2	Take It Easy	Sunil Prem Vyas	Vikram Gokhale, Dipannita Sharma, Raj Zutshi, Anang Desai, Joy Sengupta, Sulabha Arya, Vijay Kashyap	Drama		
J A N	9	Tevar	Amit Sharma	Arjun Kapoor, Sonakshi Sinha, Raj Babbar, Manoj Bajpai	Action, Romance	Eros International, MAD Entertainment, Naresh Agarwal Films, Sanjay Kapoor Entertainment	
J A N	16	Alone	Bhushan Patel	Bipasha Basu, Karan Singh Grover	Horror	Panorama Studios	
J A N	16	Crazy Cukkad Family	Ritesh Menon	Swanand Kirkire, Shilpa Shukla, Ninad Kamat, Kushal Punjabi, Kiran Karmarkar, Yusuf Hussain	Comedy		
J A N	16	Sharafat Gayi Tel Lene	Gurmmeet Singh	Zayed Khan, Tina Desai, Rannvijay Singh, Talia Benson, Anupam Kher	Comedy, Thriller		
J A N	23	Baby	Neeraj Pandey	Akshay Kumar, Taapsee Pannu, Rana Daggubati, Anupam Kher, Kay Kay Menon, Danny Denzongpa	Thriller	T-Series Films, Friday Filmworks, Cape of Good Films, Crouching Tiger Motion Pictures	
J A N	23	Dolly Ki Doli	Abhishek Dogra	Sonam Kapoor, Pulkit Samrat, Rajkummar Rao, Varun Sharma	Romantic, Comedy	Kinesis Films, Arbaaz Khan Production	
J A N	30	Chal Guru Ho Ja Shuru	Manoj Sharma	Hemant Pandey, Chandrachur Singh, Sanjay Mishra, Manoj Pahwa	Comedy		
J A N	30	Hawaizaada	Vibhu Puri	Ayushmann Khurrana, Pallavi Sharda	Drama	Reliance Entertainment, Trilogic Media, Film Farmers	
J A N	30	Khamoshiyan	Karan Dara	Gurmeet Choudhary, Ali Fazal, Sapna Pabbi	Horror	Fox Star Studios, Vishesh Films	
J A N	30	Rahasya	Manish Gupta	Tisca Chopra, Ashish Vidyarthi, Kay Kay Menon	Mystery	Viacom18 Motion Pictures, UVI Film Productions	
F E B	6	Jai Jawaan Jai Kisaan	Milan Ajmera	Jatin Khurana, Om Puri, Prem Chopra, Rati Agnihotri, Rishi Bhutani, Sanjay Chakraborty, Akhilesh Jain	Drama		
F E B	6	Shamitabh	R. Balki	Amitabh Bachchan, Dhanush, Akshara Haasan	Drama	Eros International, Hope Productions	
F E B	13	MSG: The Messenger	Gurmeet Ram Rahim Singh, Jeetu Arora	Gurmeet Ram Rahim Singh, Daniel Kaleb, Flora Saini, Jayshree Soni, Olexandra Semen, Gaurav Gera, Jay Singh Rajpoot, Himanshu Tiwari	Action, Drama		
F E B	13	Roy	Vikramjit Singh	Ranbir Kapoor, Jacqueline Fernandez, Arjun Rampal	Romance, Thriller	T-Series Films	
F E B	20	Badlapur	Sriram Raghavan	Varun Dhawan, Nawazuddin Siddiqui, Huma Qureshi, Yami Gautam, Vinay Pathak, Divya Dutta	Action, Thriller	Eros International, Maddock Films	
F E B	20	Qissa	Anup Singh	Irrfan Khan, Tillotama Shome, Tisca Chopra, Faezeh Jalali, Rasika Duggal	Historical Drama		
F E B	27	Ab Tak Chhappan 2	Aejaz Gulab	Nana Patekar, Ashutosh Rana, Vikram Gokhale, Gul Panag	Crime, Drama		
F E B	27	Dum Laga Ke Haisha	Sharat Katariya	Ayushmann Khurrana, Bhumi Pednekar	Comedy	Yash Raj Films	
M A R	6	Badmashiyaan	Amit Khanna	Suzzanna Mukherjee, Sidhant Gupta, Gunjan Malhotra, Sharib Hashmi, Karan Mehra	Romantic comedy		
M A R	6	Coffee Bloom	Manu Warrier	Arjun Mathur, Sugandha Garg, Mohan Kapur	Romance, Drama		
M A R	6	Dirty Politics	K. C. Bokadia	Mallika Sherawat, Naseeruddin Shah, Jackie Shroff, Atul Kulkarni, Anupam Kher, Ashutosh Rana	Political Drama		
M A R	6	Hey Bro	Ajay Chandhok	Ganesh Acharya, Nupur Sharma, Maninder Singh	Comedy, Action		
M A R	13	NH10	Navdeep Singh	Anushka Sharma, Neil Bhoopalam, Darshan Kumar	Thriller	Eros International, Clean Slate Filmz, Phantom Films	
M A R	20	Dilliwali Zaalim Girlfriend	Japinder Kaur	Divyendu Sharma, Jackie Shroff, Prachi Mishra, Ira Dubey	Comedy		
M A R	20	Hunterrr	Harshavardhan Kulkarni	Gulshan Devaiah, Radhika Apte, Sai Tamhankar	Comedy	Shemaroo Entertainment, Falco, Bala Industries & Entertainment, Tailormade Films, Phantom Films	
M A R	27	Barkhaa	Shadaab Mirza	Sara Loren, Taaha Shah, Shweta Pandit, Priyanshu Chatterjee	Romance		
M A R	27	Yahaan Sabki Lagi Hai	Satavisha Bose, Cyrus R. khambhata	Varun Thakur, Eden Shyodhi, Heerok Das, Teeshay Shah	Social		

== April–June ==
Opening		Title	Director	Cast	Genre	Studio	Source
A P R	3	Detective Byomkesh Bakshy!	Dibakar Banerjee	Sushant Singh Rajput, Anand Tiwari, Swastika Mukherjee, Divya Menon, Neeraj Kabi, Meiyang Chang	Thriller	Yash Raj Films, DBP	
A P R	3	Luckhnowi Ishq	Aanand Raut	Adhyayan Suman, Karishma Kotak	Romance		
A P R	10	Dharam Sankat Mein	Fuwad Khan	Naseeruddin Shah, Paresh Rawal, Annu Kapoor, Murali Sharma	Drama	Viacom18 Motion Pictures, Trigno Media	
A P R	10	Ek Paheli Leela	Bobby Khan	Sunny Leone, Jay Bhanushali, Mohit Ahlawat, Rajneesh Duggal, Rahul Dev, Jas Arora	Musical	T-Series Films, Paper Doll Entertainment	
A P R	17	Court	Chaitanya Tamhane	Vira Satidhar, Vivek Gombher, Geetanjali Kulkarni	Drama	Zoo Entertainment	
A P R	17	Margarita with a Straw	Shonali Bose	Kalki Koechlin, Revathi, Hussain Dalal	Drama	Viacom18 Motion Pictures, Ishan Talkies	
A P R	17	Mr. X	Vikram Bhatt	Emraan Hashmi, Amyra Dastur	Sci fi/thriller	Fox Star Studios, Vishesh Films	
A P R	17	NH-8 Road to Nidhivan	Munindra Gupta	Auroshikha Dey, Ravneet Kaur, Satyakam Anand, Arjun Fauzdar, Swaroopa Ghosh	Horror		
A P R	17	Ek Adbhut Dakshina Guru Dakshina	Kiran Phadnis	Rajeev Govinda Pillai, Rajesh Shringarpure, Sulagna Panigrahi, Girish Karnad, Roopa Ganguly	Dance/drama		
A P R	24	Ishq Ke Parindey	Shakir Khan	Rishi Verma, Priyanka Mehta, Manjul Aazad, Yasir Iftikhar Khan	Romance		
A P R	24	Kaagaz Ke Fools	Anil Kumar Chaudhary	Vinay Pathak, Mugdha Godse, Raima Sen, Saurabh Shukla, Rajendra Sethi, Amit Behl	Comedy		
M A Y	1	Gabbar Is Back	Krish	Akshay Kumar, Shruti Haasan, Suman	Crime/action	Viacom18 Motion Pictures, Bhansali Productions	
M A Y	1	Sabki Bajegi Band	Anirudh Chawla	Sumeet Vyas, Swara Bhaskar, Alekh Sangal, Shaurya Chauhan, Amol Parashar	Thriller/drama	Percept Pictures, Yen Movies	
M A Y	8	Kuch Kuch Locha Hai	Devang Dholakia	Ram Kapoor, Sunny Leone, Evelyn Sharma, Navdeep Chabbra	Comedy		
M A Y	8	Piku	Shoojit Sircar	Amitabh Bachchan, Deepika Padukone, Irrfan Khan, Moushumi Chatterjee, Jisshu Sengupta	Comedy/drama	MSM Motion Pictures, Saraswati Entertainment, Rising Sun Films	
M A Y	15	Bombay Velvet	Anurag Kashyap	Ranbir Kapoor, Anushka Sharma, Karan Johar, Kay Kay Menon	Crime/drama	Fox Star Studios, Phantom Films	
M A Y	22	Main Hoon Part-Time Killer	Faisal Saif	Adithya Menon, Kavita Radheshyam	Spoof, comedy, thriller		
M A Y	22	Tanu Weds Manu: Returns	Anand L. Rai	R. Madhavan, Kangana Ranaut	Romance/comedy	Eros International, Colour Yellow Productions	
M A Y	27	Waiting	Anu Menon	Naseeruddin Shah, Kalki Koechlin, Arjun Mathur, Rajat Kapoor, Suhasini Maniratnam	Drama	Drishyam Films, Ishka Films	
M A Y	29	I Love Desi	Pankaj Batra	Vedant Bali, Priyanka Shah, Gulshan Grover	Comedy		
M A Y	29	Ishqedarriyaan	V. K. Prakash	Mahaakshay Chakraborty, Evelyn Sharma, Kavin Dave, Mohit Dutta	Drama		
M A Y	29	P Se PM Tak	Kundan Shah	Meenakshi Dixit, Rocky Verma, Bharat Jadhav, Yashpal Sharma	Comedy		
M A Y	29	Welcome 2 Karachi	Ashish R Mohan	Arshad Warsi, Jackky Bhagnani, Lauren Gottlieb, Ayub Khoso, Adnan Shah, Imran Hasnee	Comedy	Pooja Entertainment	
J U N	5	Dil Dhadakne Do	Zoya Akhtar	Anil Kapoor, Shefali Shah, Priyanka Chopra, Ranveer Singh, Anushka Sharma, Farhan Akhtar, Rahul Bose, Zarina Wahab	Drama	Eros International, Junglee Pictures, Excel Entertainment	
J U N	5	Mere Genie Uncle	Ashish Bhavsar	Tiku Talsania, Swati Kapoor, Shakti Kapoor, Ehsaan Qureshi	Drama		
J U N	12	Hamari Adhuri Kahani	Mohit Suri	Emraan Hashmi, Vidya Balan, Rajkummar Rao	Romance/drama	Fox Star Studios, Vishesh Films	
J U N	19	ABCD 2	Remo D'Souza	Varun Dhawan, Shraddha Kapoor, Prabhu Deva, Lauren Gottlieb, Dharmesh Yelande, Punit Pathak, Raghav Juyal	Dance	Walt Disney Pictures, UTV Motion Pictures	
J U N	26	Miss Tanakpur Haazir Ho	Vinod Kapri	Annu Kapoor, Om Puri, Rahul Bagga, Hrishitaa Bhatt	Comedy/drama	Fox Star Studios, Crossword Films, NG Film Crafts	
J U N	26	Uvaa	Jasbir Bhaati	Om Puri, Jimmy Sheirgill, Sangram Singh, Archana Puran Singh	Social/comedy		
J U N	26	Lion of Gujarat	Dinesh Lamba	Dinesh Lamba, Akruti Agrawal, Homi Wadia	Action		

== July–September ==
Opening		Title	Director	Cast	Genre	Studio	Source
J U L	3	Bezubaan Ishq	Jashwant Gangani	Nishant Singh Malkani, Mugdha Godse, Sneha Ullal	Romance		
J U L	3	Guddu Rangeela	Subhash Kapoor	Arshad Warsi, Aditi Rao Hydari, Amit Sadh	Comedy	Fox Star Studios, Mangl Murti Films	
J U L	3	Second Hand Husband	Smeep Kang	Gippy Grewal, Tina Ahuja, Dharmendra	Drama		
J U L	10	I Love NY	Radhika Rao	Sunny Deol, Kangana Ranaut	Romance/drama	T-Series Films	
J U L	10	Thoda Lutf Thoda Ishq	Sachin Gupta	Hiten Tejwani, Sanjay Mishra	Romance/drama		
J U L	17	Bajrangi Bhaijaan	Kabir Khan	Salman Khan, Kareena Kapoor, Nawazuddin Siddiqui, Harshaali Malhotra	Action, comedy, drama	Eros International, Salman Khan Films, Kabir Khan Films	
J U L	24	Aisa Yeh Jahaan	Biswajeet Bora	Palash Sen, Ira Dubey, Kymsleen Kholie, Yashpal Sharma	Drama		
J U L	24	Masaan	Neeraj Ghaywan	Richa Chadha, Vicky Kaushal, Sanjay Mishra, Shweta Tripathi	Drama	Drishyam Films, Phantom Films, Macassar Productions, Sikhya Entertainment, Pathé, Arte France Cinéma	
J U L	31	Drishyam	Nishikant Kamat	Ajay Devgn, Tabu, Shriya Saran, Rajat Kapoor	Drama/thriller	Viacom18 Motion Pictures, Panorama Studios	
A U G	7	Bangistan	Karan Anshuman	Riteish Deshmukh, Pulkit Samrat	Comedy	Junglee Pictures, Excel Entertainment, Zorg Werke	
A U G	14	Brothers	Karan Malhotra	Akshay Kumar, Sidharth Malhotra, Jacqueline Fernandez, Jackie Shroff, Conan Stevens	Drama	Fox Star Studios, Lionsgate, Dharma Productions, Endemol India	
A U G	14	Gour Hari Dastaan	Ananth Narayan Mahadevan	Vinay Pathak, Konkona Sen Sharma, Ranvir Shorey, Tannishtha Chatterjee	Drama		
A U G	21	All Is Well	Umesh Shukla	Abhishek Bachchan, Asin Thottumkal, Rishi Kapoor, Supriya Pathak	Drama	T-Series Films, Alchemy Film Productions	
A U G	21	Manjhi – The Mountain Man	Ketan Mehta	Nawazuddin Siddiqui, Radhika Apte	Drama	Viacom 18 Motion Pictures, NFDC, Maya Movies	
A U G	21	Rolling Dream	Maahi Kaur	Saachi Tiwari	Drama		
A U G	28	Kaun Kitney Paani Mein	Nila Madhab Panda	Saurabh Shukla, Radhika Apte, Gulshan Grover	Social/drama		
A U G	28	Phantom	Kabir Khan	Saif Ali Khan, Katrina Kaif	Action/thriller	UTV Motion Pictures, Nadiadwala Grandson Entertainment	
S E P	4	Welcome Back	Anees Bazmee	John Abraham, Shruti Hassan, Anil Kapoor, Nana Patekar, Paresh Rawal, Dimple Kapadia	Romance/comedy	Base Industries Group, Eros International, Swiss Entertainment	
S E P	4	Lakhon Hain Yahan Dilwale	Munnawar Bhagat	Aditya Pancholi, Arun Bakshi, Kishori Shahane	Romance		
S E P	11	Hero	Nikhil Advani	Sooraj Pancholi, Athiya Shetty, Salman Khan, Tigmanshu Dhulia, Aditya Pancholi, Sharad Kelkar	Action/romance	Eros International, Salman Khan Films, Mukta Arts, Emmay Entertainment	
S E P	11	Sorry Daddy	Vijay Pal and Shakur	Shamim Khan, Mukesh Tiwari, Tinu Verma	Action/drama		
S E P	18	Katti Batti	Nikhil Advani	Imran Khan, Kangana Ranaut	Romance/comedy	UTV Motion Pictures, Emmay Entertainment	
S E P	18	Meeruthiya Gangster	Zeishan Quadri	Jaideep Ahlawat, Aakash Dahiya, Shadab Kamal, Nushrat Bharucha, Ishita Sharma	Crime/comedy		
S E P	25	Kis Kisko Pyaar Karoon	Abbas–Mustan	Kapil Sharma, Arbaz Khan, Manjari Phadnis, Simran Kaur Mundi, Elli Avram, Sai Lokur, Varun Sharma, Supriya Pathak	Comedy	Venus Worldwide Entertainment, Abbas–Mustan Films Production, Pooja Entertainment, Trigger Edge	
S E P	25	Bhaag Johnny	Shivam Nair	Kunal Khemu, Zoa Morani, Mandana Karimi	Drama	T-Series Films	

== October–December ==
Opening		Title	Director	Cast	Genre	Studio	Source
O C T	2	Singh Is Bliing	Prabhu Deva	Akshay Kumar, Amy Jackson	Comedy	Pen Studios, Grazing Goat Pictures	
O C T	2	Talvar	Meghna Gulzar	Irrfan Khan, Konkona Sen Sharma, Tabu	Thriller	Junglee Pictures, VB Pictures	
O C T	9	Jazbaa	Sanjay Gupta	Aishwarya Rai Bachchan, Irrfan Khan, Shabana Azmi	Action/drama	Essel Vision Productions, Viking Media & Entertainment, White Feather Films	
O C T	16	Bumper Draw	Irshad Khan	Rajpal Yadav, Zakir Hussain, Subrat Dutta, Rushad Rana	Comedy		
O C T	16	Chinar Daastaan-E-Ishq	Sharique Minhaj	Faisal Khan, Inayat Sharma, Dalip Tahil, Shahbaz Khan	Romantic/drama		
O C T	16	Pyaar Ka Punchnama 2	Luv Ranjan	Kartik Aaryan, Nushrat Bharucha, Sonnalli Seygall, Omkar Kapoor	Comedy	Viacom18 Motion Pictures, Panorama Studios	
O C T	16	Wedding Pullav	Binod Pradhan	Anushka Ranjan, Diganth Manchale, Karan Grover, Rishi Kapoor, Sonnalli Seygall	Comedy		
O C T	22	Shaandaar	Vikas Bahl	Shahid Kapoor, Alia Bhatt, Pankaj Kapur	Romance/comedy	Fox Star Studios, Dharma Productions, Phantom Films	
O C T	30	Titli	Kanu Behl	Shashank Arora, Ranvir Shorey, Amit Sial, Lalit Behl	Crime	Yash Raj Films, DBP	
O C T	30	Main Aur Charles	Prawaal Raman	Randeep Hooda, Richa Chadha, Adil Hussain, Nandu Madhav	Thriller		
O C T	30	Once Upon a Time in Bihar	Nitin Chandra	Ashish Vidyarthi, Kranti Prakash Jha, Ajay Kumar, Arti Puri, Pankaj Jha, Deepak Singh	Political		
O C T	30	Guddu Ki Gun	Shantanu Ray Chhibber, Sheershak Anand	Kunal Khemu, Payel Sarkar, Aparna Sharma, Sumeet Vyas	Comedy	Trigger Edge, Emenox Media	
O C T	30	Love Exchange	Raj V Shetty	Mohit Madan, Jyoti Sharma	Romance		
O C T	30	Prithipal Singh... A Story	Babita Puri	Vikas Kumar, Anjali Singh	Biopic		
N O V	6	Four Pillars of Basement	Giresh Naik K	Dillzan Wadia, Bruna Abdullah, Aaliya Singh, Zakir Hussain	Thriller		
N O V	6	Charlie Kay Chakkar Mein	Manish Srivasta	Naseeruddin Shah	Crime/thriller		
N O V	6	Yaara Silly Silly	Subhash Sehgal	Paoli Dam, Parambrata Chatterjee	Romance		
N O V	6	Ranbanka	Aryeman Ramsay	Manish Paul, Ravi Kishan, Pooja Thakur	Action		
N O V	12	Prem Ratan Dhan Payo	Sooraj Barjatya	Salman Khan, Sonam Kapoor, Neil Nitin Mukesh, Swara Bhaskar, Armaan Kohli, Anupam Kher, Deepak Dobriyal, Sanjay Mishra	Romance	Fox Star Studios, Rajshri Productions	
N O V	20	X: Past Is Present	Various Directors	Rajat Kapoor, Huma Qureshi	Anthology	Drishyam Films, Made In Madras Ink	
N O V	27	Angry Indian Goddesses	Pan Nalin	Sarah-Jane Dias, Tannishtha Chatterjee, Anushka Manchanda, Sandhya Mridul	Drama		
N O V	27	Tamasha	Imtiaz Ali	Deepika Padukone, Ranbir Kapoor	Romance	UTV Motion Pictures, Nadiadwala Grandson Entertainment, Window Seat Films	
D E C	4	Hate Story 3	Vishal Pandya	Zarine Khan, Daisy Shah, Sharman Joshi, Karan Singh Grover	Adult/thriller	T-Series Films	
D E C	4	Kajarya	Madhureeta Anand	Meenu Hooda, Ridhima Sud, Kuldeep Ruhil	Drama		
D E C	11	The Silent Heroes	Mahesh Bhatt	Maanuv Bhardawaj, Priyanka Panchal, Mann Bagga, Simran Deep, Nirmal Kumar Pant	Adventure		
D E C	18	Bajirao Mastani	Sanjay Leela Bhansali	Ranveer Singh, Deepika Padukone, Priyanka Chopra	Romance	Eros International, Bhansali Productions	
D E C	18	Dilwale	Rohit Shetty	Shah Rukh Khan, Kajol, Varun Dhawan, Kriti Sanon	Action/romance	Red Chillies Entertainment, Rohit Shetty Productions	

== See also ==
- List of Bollywood films of 2016
- List of Bollywood films of 2014
