= Bajrangi Bhaijaan (soundtrack) =

- Soundtrack album cover

Soundtrack album by Pritam
- Released: 17 June 2015
- Genre: Feature film soundtrack
- Length: 57:37
- Language: Hindi
- Label: T-Series

Pritam chronology
| Holiday: A Soldier Is Never Off Duty (2014) | Bajrangi Bhaijaan (2015) | Phantom (2015) |

Bajrangi Bhaijaan is the soundtrack to the 2015 Indian Hindi-language comedy-drama film of the same name directed by Kabir Khan from an original story written by V. Vijayendra Prasad, starring Salman Khan, Harshaali Malhotra, Kareena Kapoor Khan and Nawazuddin Siddiqui. The film's soundtrack features eleven songs: with seven original, three reprises and an alternative version. All those songs were curated and composed by Pritam and written by Amitabh Bhattacharya, Shabbir Ahmed, Kausar Munir, Mayur Puri, Neelesh Misra and Badshah. The soundtrack was released by T-Series on 17 June 2015.

== Development ==
A. R. Rahman was initially considered to score music for Bajrangi Bhaijaan, but Rahman did not sign the film. Then Kabir turned to his usual collaborators: Pritam for composing the songs and Julius Packiam for the score. The title song for Ae Dil Hai Mushkil (2016) was eventually composed for the film, with another song "Tu Jo Mila". As Pritam had two options for the romantic song featuring Salman and Kareena, he chose the latter. Salman Khan was intended to sing one of the tracks, which had an "R. D. Burman kind of energy", according to Pritam. However, he did not contribute to any of the tracks in the album.

== Release ==
The first single from the album "Selfie Le Le Re" was released on 24 May 2015, coincided with an event held during the 2015 Indian Premier League final between Chennai Super Kings and Mumbai Indians, with Salman and Kabir participating. The song was picturised on Salman's character worshipping Hanuman at the Hanuman Jayanti celebration. The second song "Tu Chahiye", a romantic number picturised on Salman and Kareena, released on 2 June 2015. The third single track "Bhar Do Jholi Meri" was released on 10 June 2015; it is a revamped version of the qawwali song "Bhar Do Jholi Meri Ya Muhammad" originally written by Purnam Allahabadi and composed and sung by the Sabri Brothers. Adnan Sami provided vocals for the song, while the track partly includes "Dam Ali Ali" from "Dama Dam Mast Qalandar". The fourth song "Aaj Ki Party" was released on 16 June 2015; this song was however not featured in the film. The soundtrack album consists of eleven tracks, was released on 17 June 2015.

== Track listing ==
| No. | Title | Lyrics | Singer(s) | Length |
|---|---|---|---|---|
| 1. | "Selfie Le Le Re" | Mayur Puri, Badshah | Pritam, Vishal Dadlani, Nakash Aziz, Badshah | 04:57 |
| 2. | "Tu Chahiye" | Amitabh Bhattacharya | Atif Aslam | 04:32 |
| 3. | "Aaj Ki Party" | Shabbir Ahmed | Mika Singh | 04:40 |
| 4. | "Bhar Do Jholi Meri" | Kausar Munir | Adnan Sami | 08:20 |
| 5. | "Chicken Kuk-Doo-Koo" | Mayur Puri | Mohit Chauhan, Palak Muchhal | 05:43 |
| 6. | "Zindagi Kuch Toh Bata" | Neelesh Misra | Rahat Fateh Ali Khan, Rekha Bhardwaj | 04:23 |
| 7. | "Tu Jo Mila" | Kausar Munir | KK | 04:04 |
| 8. | "Bhar Do Jholi Meri" (Reprise) | Kausar Munir | Imran Aziz Mian | 08:05 |
| 9. | "Tu Jo Mila (Dekhna Na Mudke)" | Kausar Munir | Javed Ali | 04:13 |
| 10. | "Zindagi Kuch Toh Bata" (Reprise) | Neelesh Misra | Jubin Nautiyal | 04:23 |
| 11. | "Tu Jo Mila" (Reprise) | Kausar Munir | Papon | 04:18 |
| Total length: | | | | 57:37 |

== Reception ==
Joginder Tuteja of Bollywood Hungama wrote "Bajrangi Bhaijaan has a couple of chartbusters which are there for the taking when it comes to being designed for Salman Khan". Aelina Kapoor of Rediff.com gave three stars and said, "Bajrangi Bhaijaan is not quite an out-and-out Salman Khan soundtrack but songs like Selfie Le Le Re and Aaj Ki Party keep energy levels high."

In contrast, A reviewer based at The Indian Express criticized the music being "run-of-the-mill" as "they vapourise just as they leave the speakers"; he rated one-and-a-half-star to the album.

== Accolades ==
| Award (Note: Awards, festivals and organisations are in alphabetical order.) | Date of ceremony (Note: Date is linked to the article about the awards held that year, wherever possible.) | Category | Recipient(s) | Result | Ref. |
|---|---|---|---|---|---|
| Global Indian Music Academy Awards | 6 April 2016 | Best Film Album | Bajrangi Bhaijaan – Pritam | Nominated | |
| Global Indian Music Academy Awards | 6 April 2016 | Best Music Director | Pritam | Nominated | |
| Global Indian Music Academy Awards | 6 April 2016 | Best Lyricist | Kausar Munir for "Tu Jo Mila" | Nominated | |
| International Indian Film Academy Awards | 26 June 2016 | Best Music Director | Pritam | Nominated | |
| Mirchi Music Awards | 29 February 2016 | Upcoming Male Vocalist of The Year | Jubin Nautiyal for "Zindagi Kuch Toh Bata (Reprise)" | Won | |
| Mirchi Music Awards | 29 February 2016 | Best Song Producer (Programming & Arranging) | Dhrubajyoti Phukan, Nikhil Paul George; Roop Mahanta, Sunny M.R. for "Selfie Le Le Re" | Nominated | |
| Producers Guild Film Awards (Note: Previously known as Apsara Film & Television Producers Guild Awards.) | 22 December 2015 | Best Music Director | Pritam | Nominated | |
| Screen Awards | 8 January 2016 | Best Background Music | Julius Packiam | Won | |
| Stardust Awards | 21 December 2015 | Best Music Director | Pritam | Nominated | |
| Stardust Awards | 21 December 2015 | Best Lyricist | Kausar Munir for "Tu Jo Mila" | Nominated | |
| Stardust Awards | 21 December 2015 | Best Playback Singer (Male) | Adnan Sami for "Bhar Do Jholi Meri" | Nominated | |
| Stardust Awards | 21 December 2015 | Best Music Album | Bajrangi Bhaijaan – T-Series | Nominated | |
| Zee Cine Awards | 20 February 2016 | Best Track of the Year | "Selfie Le Le Re" | Nominated | |

== Controversy ==
EMI Pakistan and Amjad Sabri, heir to the Sabri Brothers, sued the producers of the film and the music label as they did not obtain the rights from the original artists and the label to use the qawwali song "Bhar Do Jholi Meri Ya Muhammad". They sent a legal notice regarding the same, which barred the producers from using the song in the film.
