= 22nd Screen Awards =

Indian film awards ceremony in 2016

- Date: 8 January 2016
- Hosted by: Kapil Sharma; Karan Johar

Highlights
- Best Picture: Bajrangi Bhaijaan
- Best Direction: Kabir Khan (Bajrangi Bhaijaan)
- Best Actor: Amitabh Bachchan / Ranveer Singh (Piku / Bajirao Mastani)
- Best Actress: Deepika Padukone (Piku)

Television coverage
- Channel: StarPlus
- Network: Star India

The 22nd annual Screen Awards are the annual Star Screen Awards held to honor the best films of 2015 from the Hindi-language film industry (commonly known as Bollywood). The ceremony was held on 8 January 2016 hosted by actor Kapil Sharma and Karan Johar.

== Awards ==
The winners and nominees have been listed below. Winners are listed first, highlighted in boldface, and indicated with a double dagger (‡).

=== Jury Awards ===
Best Film	Best Director
**Bajrangi Bhaijaan**‡; Bajirao Mastani; Dil Dhadakne Do; Piku; Talvar; Tanu Weds Manu: Returns	**Kabir Khan – Bajrangi Bhaijaan**‡; Aanand L. Rai – Tanu Weds Manu: Returns; Meghna Gulzar – Talvar; Sanjay Leela Bhansali – Bajirao Mastani; Shoojit Sircar – Piku; Sriram Raghavan – Badlapur; Zoya Akhtar – Dil Dhadakne Do
Best Actor	Best Actress
**Amitabh Bachchan – Piku**‡; **Ranveer Singh – Bajirao Mastani**‡; Irrfan Khan – Talvar; Ranbir Kapoor – Tamasha; Salman Khan – Bajrangi Bhaijaan; Varun Dhawan – Badlapur	**Deepika Padukone – Piku**‡; Anushka Sharma – NH10; Kalki Koechlin – Margarita with a Straw; Kangana Ranaut – Tanu Weds Manu: Returns; Priyanka Chopra – Dil Dhadakne Do; Sonam Kapoor – Dolly Ki Doli
Best Supporting Actor	Best Supporting Actress
**Anil Kapoor – Dil Dhadakne Do**‡; **Nawazuddin Siddiqui – Bajrangi Bhaijaan**‡	**Priyanka Chopra – Bajirao Mastani**‡
Best Actor in a Negative Role – Male	Best Actor in a Negative Role – Female
**Ronit Roy** – **Guddu Rangeela**‡; Darshan Kumar – NH10; Gajraj Rao – Talvar; Rajkummar Rao – Hamari Adhuri Kahani; Randeep Hooda – Main Aur Charles	**Deepti Naval** – **NH10**‡; Shabana Azmi – Jazbaa; Swastika Mukherjee – Detective Byomkesh Bakshy!; Tanvi Azmi – Bajirao Mastani; Tisca Chopra – Rahasya
Best Actor in a Comic Role – Male / Female	Best Child Artist
**Deepak Dobriyal – Tanu Weds Manu: Returns**‡	**Harshaali Malhotra** – **Bajrangi Bhaijaan**‡
Most Promising Newcomer – Male	Most Promising Newcomer – Female
**Vicky Kaushal – Masaan**‡; Kapil Sharma – Kis Kisko Pyaar Karoon; Omkar Kapoor – Pyaar Ka Punchnama 2; Shashank Arora – Titli; Sooraj Pancholi – Hero	**Bhumi Pednekar – Dum Laga Ke Haisha**‡; Akshara Haasan – Shamitabh; Athiya Shetty – Hero; Shivani Raghuvanshi – Titli; Shweta Tripathi – Masaan
Most Promising Debut Director	Best Ensemble Cast
**Neeraj Ghaywan – Masaan**‡	**Dil Dhadakne Do**‡; Dilwale; Dum Laga Ke Haisha; Pyaar Ka Punchnama 2; Welcome Back
Best Music Director	Best Lyricist
**Amaal Mallik, Ankit Tiwari, Meet Bros – Roy**‡	**Varun Grover – "Moh Moh Ke Dhaage" – Dum Laga Ke Haisha**‡
Best Playback Singer Male	Best Playback Singer Female
**Papon – "Moh Moh Ke Dhaage" – Dum Laga Ke Haisha**‡	**Monali Thakur – "Moh Moh Ke Dhaage" – Dum Laga Ke Haisha**‡

=== Technical Awards ===
Best Story	Best Screenplay
**V. Vijayendra Prasad** – **Bajrangi Bhaijaan**‡	**Vishal Bhardwaj** – **Talvar**‡
Best Dialogue	Best Background Music
**Juhi Chaturvedi** – **Piku**‡	**Julius Packiam** – **Bajrangi Bhaijaan**‡
Best Editing	Best Cinematography
**A. Sreekar Prasad** – **Talvar**‡; **Pooja Ladha Surti** – **Badlapur**‡	**Sudeep Chatterjee** – **Bajirao Mastani**‡
Best Production Design	Best Visual Effects
**Saloni Dhatrak, Sriram Iyengar, Sujeet Sawant** – **Bajirao Mastani**‡	**Prasad Sutar** – **Bajirao Mastani**‡
Best Costume Design	Best Choreography
**Anju Modi** & **Maxima Basu** – **Bajirao Mastani**‡	**Remo D'Souza** – **"Vande Mataram"** – **ABCD 2**‡
Best Sound Design	Best Action
**Bishwadeep Chatterjee** – **Piku**‡	**Abdul Salaam Ansari, Armin Sauer** – **NH10**‡

=== Popular Choice Awards ===
Best Actor	Best Actress
**Shah Rukh Khan** – **Dilwale**‡	**Deepika Padukone** – **Bajirao Mastani**‡

=== Special Jury Awards ===
Special Jury Award – Best Film
**Meghna Gulzar – Talvar**‡
Special Jury Award – Best Actor	Special Jury Award – Best Actress
**Irrfan Khan – Talvar**‡	**Kalki Koechlin – Margarita with a Straw**‡

Lifetime Achievement Award
- **Rishi Kapoor**
Jodi No. 1
- **Shah Rukh Khan & Kajol**
