= Chand Nawab =

Pakistani journalist

- چاند نواب
- Born: 1963 (age 62–63); Mirpurkhas, Pakistan
- Education: Mass Communication-Karachi University Engineering Diploma-Poly Technical Institute Karachi
- Occupations: Journalist; News presenter
- Years active: 2008-present
- Known for: Inspiring the character of Chand Nawab in the Bollywood movie Bajrangi Bhaijaan

Chand Nawab (born 1963) is a Pakistani journalist from Karachi. Chand Nawab is a popular media personality. Before Joining ARY News, Chand Nawab has been working for different print and electronic media houses. In 2008, a video of Chand Nawab surfaced on YouTube in which he fumbled while reporting Eid festival in Karachi. He went viral on YouTube and on different social media platforms.

Nawab notably inspired Nawazuddin Siddiqui's character, also known as Chand Nawab, in the 2015 Hindi film Bajrangi Bhaijaan.

== Life and career ==
Nawab was born in Mirpurkhas, Pakistan. Later his family moved to Karachi. He has done his Masters in Mass Communication from University of Karachi. He also held a diploma in Engineering from Poly Technical College Karachi.

Chand Nawab started his career as a Journalist in various print and electronic media houses. He has been working for some renowned newspapers such as HURRIYET (DAILY) and Daily Morning Special Karachi. He worked in a well-known news agency PPI - Pakistan Press International. He joined as a senior reporter for Indus TV Karachi. He had also been working as a reporter 24News HD and 92News. Currently he is working in one of the most popular Pakistani news channel; ARY News.

He has also shown his acting skills in different dramas under AJ and Hum Drama production houses. He has appeared in different commercials for some of the famous Pakistani brands including KFC, Easy Paisa, BATA shoes, Service Shoes. He also worked in two Pakistani films.

== Viral Video of Chand Nawab ==
Chand Nawab gained widespread public recognition through a video uploaded in 2008. In this notorious clip, Chand Nawab was trying to report the Eid festival frenzy while standing on a stairway at a railway station in Karachi, all while repeatedly being interrupted by passengers making the journalist irritated. The unedited video became widely popular on social media. The video went viral, garnering millions of views on YouTube and on many other social platforms. According to Chand Nawab, initially, when the video clip went viral, he had lost all hope to survive in journalism; he felt that because, his journalistic reputation had been tarnished, and that nobody was willing to hire him as a reporter.

== Revival of Popularity and Fame ==
Chand Nawab's popularity had a resurgence starting in 2016 when his viral video inspired Indian filmmaker Kabir Khan to create Nawazuddin Siddiqui's character Chand Nawab in his 2015 blockbuster Bajrangi Bhaijaan. Acclaimed actor Nawazuddin Siddiqui recreated Chand Nawab's railway station scene. Once again, the original video of Chand Nawab went viral and it received millions of views all over the world.

Chand Nawab received instant fame. He received a lot of appreciation from India and Pakistan especially from Bollywood star Salman Khan and other cast of Bajrangi Bhaijaan. He did many live interviews for Pakistan and Skype interviews for Indian News Channels as well. The viral Chand Nawab clip was translated in many different languages. He was offered acting roles in TV dramas. He has also being asked to act in Bollywood movies, and even some foreign TV channels. Different Pakistani print and electronic news channels hurried to hire him as their journalist and reporters.

== Languages ==
Chand Nawab speaks many languages including Urdu, Arabic, Persian, Sindhi, Punjabi, Balochi etc.
