= International Hero =

International Hero may refer to:

- Action Force (video game), also known as Action Force: International Hero
- International (film), a 2015 action film
