= Akhanda 2: Thaandavam =

2025 Indian film by Boyapati Srinu

Akhanda 2
- Theatrical release poster
- Directed by: Boyapati Srinu
- Written by: Boyapati Sreenu
- Produced by: Ram Achanta; Gopi Achanta; Ishan Saksena
- Starring: Nandamuri Balakrishna; Aadhi Pinisetty; Samyuktha; Harshaali Malhotra
- Cinematography: C. Ramprasad; Santosh Detake
- Edited by: Tammiraju
- Music by: Thaman S.
- Production companies: 14 Reels Plus Entertainment; IVY Entertainment
- Distributed by: Zee Studios
- Release date: 12 December 2025
- Running time: 165 minutes
- Country: India
- Language: Telugu
- Budget: ₹120 crore
- Box office: est. ₹120–128 crore

Akhanda 2: Thaandavam (transl. Undivided 2: Thaandavam) is a 2025 Indian Telugu-language fantasy action drama film written and directed by Boyapati Sreenu. The film stars Nandamuri Balakrishna in dual role, alongside Aadhi Pinisetty, Samyuktha, and Harshaali Malhotra. It is a sequel to the 2021 film Akhanda.

The film has music composed by Thaman S, cinematography handled by C Ramprasad and editing by Tammiraju. It was released theatrically on 12 December 2025. It generally received mixed to negative reviews and became a box-office bomb.

== Plot ==
After the events of the first film, NIA officer Perumal submits reports to the NIA head and explains about Akhanda's fight process. The NIA head mentions him as a criminal and asks to take action on Akhanda, but Perumal refuses and decides to submit his resignation. The NIA head mentions that they will stop at nothing to catch Akhanda; Perumal responds that no one has ever caught Akhanda.

Meanwhile, Akhanda continues the process of restoring temples, reaching his native place and meeting his teacher. His teacher talks about finding him as a child, and explains about a rare and extremely powerful sadhana called "Ashta Siddhi" Sadhana that might face more challenges in the future. Akhanda moves on to go for this sadhana, at the same place where Arjuna had done sadhana in the Dwapar Yuga to attain Pashupatastra.

14 Years later near Tibet border china army leader Xiang lee creates a massive attack in a village while religious gathering and explain reason about passing letter about there family who were ruling since hundred years and challenges religious head to pass his challenge to god while returning he receives and reaches border and finds so many dead bodies of their soldiers including his son and learns that his son was dead due to single punch of Indian soldier while celebrations after losing a war with the Indian Army, the Chinese Army plans to attack India by trying destroying the spirituality of the Indian people. To do so, the army launches a deadly bioweapon attack, which targets the massive crowds at the Maha Kumbh Mela, causing panic to spread across India, with the help of a greedy minister named Ajit Thakur. Scientists race against time to develop an antidote that could save millions of lives, with Dr. Janani — a brilliant young scientist working under DRDO officer Archana Goswami — taking the lead and successfully creating a vaccine.

However, Ajit intent on exploiting this discovery begin to target Janani and her work, forcing her into danger. Ajit's brother Ajay chases and catches Janani after killing all her fellow scientists, including Archana. Akhanda, as a powerful avatar of Lord Shiva with divine strength, re-emerges to protect Janani and kills Ajay and his men. Simultaneously, Janani's father and Akhanda's twin brother, Murali Krishna, becomes involved in the escalating conflict. Together, they face both human and mystical adversaries who seek to harness occult power and utilizing biological warfare for their own gain.

As the threat grows, Akhanda navigates battlefields, spiritual arenas, and border conflicts, combining intense combat with ritualistic and mystical elements, including killing his rival Netra, a wizard who has deeply mastered black magic. He must thwart the plans for unleashing further destruction upon the nation while upholding the ideals of faith and righteousness. Throughout the struggle, Akhanda's divine resolve and martial prowess emerge as pivotal forces in countering both external aggression and internal decay.

In the climax, Akhanda confronts the masterminds behind the chaos by going into the India-China border and confronting the Chinese Army and Ajit, in order to restore a measure of justice.

== Cast ==
- Nandamuri Balakrishna in a dual role as:
  - Akhanda Rudra Sikandar Ghora
  - MLA Bala Murali Krishna
- Aadhi Pinisetty as Netra, an evil Tantrik
- Samyuktha as Archana Goswami, DRDO Officer
- Harshaali Malhotra as Janani, Murali Krishna and Saranya's daughter, DRDO scientist
- Viji Chandrasekhar as Dharani, Akhanda and Murali's mother
- Saswata Chatterjee as Chang, ex-general of China
- Sangay Tsheltrim as Xiang Lee, Chinese army general
- Sarvadaman D. Banerjee as Aditya Ram Bhagat, Indian Prime Minister
- Kabir Duhan Singh as Ajit Thakur, Opposition MP
- Ronson Vincent as Ajay Thakur, Ajit's brother
- Poorna as Padmavathi IAS, Principal Secretary
- Sharath Lohitashwa as Krishnamacharya Perumal, an NIA officer
- Jhansi as NIA Chief
- Ayyappa P. Sharma as Prachanda, Netra’s assistant
- Ravi Prakash as Vishal Trivedi, collector of Kadapa
- Anish Kuruvilla as Rao, Defence Minister of India
- Sai Dheena as Tamil goon
- Bharani Shankar as Kannada goon
- Raccha Ravi as Ravi, Murali’s assistant
- Mathew Varghese as PM’s advisor
- Kriss Venugopal as Ajith’s father

Cameo appearance

- Tarun Khanna as Lord Shiva
- Pragya Jaiswal as Sharanya Murali Krishna, Murali's wife and Janani's mother (Photo achieve)
- Jagapathi Babu as Aghora Baba (archive footage from Akhanda)
- Avinash Yelandur as Ramachandriah; Akhanda and Murali's father (archive footage from Akhanda)

== Production ==
=== Development ===
After the massive success of Akhanda (2021), director Boyapati Sreenu confirmed in early 2024 that a sequel was in development. The film was officially announced as BB4 on the occasion of Nandamuri Balakrishna, as it marks the fourth collaboration between Balakrishna and Boyapati.

On 25 January 2025, the team officially announced Samyuktha as the female lead. On 2 February 2025, makers announced Aadhi Pinisetty as Antagonist opposite Balakrishna. On 2 July 2025, Harshaali Malhotra were announced to be on board, marking her debut in Telugu cinema. A.S. Prakash worked as the production designer of the film marking his fifth collaboration with Boyapati Srinu after Simha (film), Legend (2014 film), Vinaya Vidheya Rama and Skanda (film).

=== Filming ===
The film was officially launched with a muhurtham shot on 16 October 2024 in Hyderabad. Principal photography began in 2024 with major schedules shot in Hyderabad, Himalayas and Kumbh Mela. In mid-2025, the team filmed key sequences in Georgia.

The film shooting wrapped up on August first week in Thiruvannamalai. and Balakrishna completed dubbing for his role on 29 August 2025.

=== Marketing ===
The film teaser was released on 9 June 2025, on the occasion of Balakrishna's birthday.

== Music ==
The soundtrack album and background score were composed by Thaman S.

The first single titled "The Thaandavam" was released on 14 November 2025 in Mumbai. The second single titled "Jajikaaya Jajikaaya" was released on 18 November 2025.

== Release ==
=== Theatrical ===
Akhanda 2 was released on 12 December 2025. It was initially set for release on 5 December 2025 but was postponed due to a stay order from the Madras High Court, following a petition filed by Eros International against 14 Reels Plus Entertainment over a financial dispute. The Madras High Court has granted permission for its release since the dues have been cleared.

=== Home media ===
The film began streaming on Netflix from 9 January 2026 in Telugu and dubbed versions of Hindi, Tamil, Kannada and Malayalam languages.

== Reception ==
Critical Reception The film received highly negative reviews. T. Maruthi Acharya of India Today rated the film 2.5/5 stars and wrote, "If you walk in expecting logic, you will leave disappointed. If you walk in expecting loudness, divinity, explosions, and a man fighting an entire army with a trishul — then Boyapati has delivered exactly what he promised." Jalapathy Gudelli of Telugucinema.com wrote, "Apart from a couple of moments in the second half and Balakrishna’s riveting performance, “Akhanda 2” struggles to make an impact. Is it anywhere close to the first Akhanda? Not at all. It has devotional elements but lacks emotional connect."

A critic from Sakshi Post rated the film 2/5 stars and wrote, "Akhanda 2: Thaandavam is a disappointing sequel that leans heavily on Balakrishna’s performance and Thaman’s music to stay afloat. The weak writing, predictable narrative, and underdeveloped characters make it a loud but hollow experience." Suresh Kavirayani of Cinema Express wrote, "It wants to be devotional, patriotic, mythological, and mass-heavy all at once. In trying to achieve everything, it spreads itself thin and ends up offering very little that feels cohesive, original, or emotionally gripping."

Box Office

Akhanda 2 grossed ₹2.75 crore (equivalent to ₹2.8 crore or US$300,000 in 2026) domestically, inclusive of ₹9 crore (equivalent to ₹9.3 crore or US$990,000 in 2026) from paid previews and ₹7.5 crore (equivalent to ₹7.7 crore or US$830,000 in 2026) overseas on its first day for a total of ₹0.25 crore (equivalent to ₹2.6 million or US$28,000 in 2026). On its second day the collections dropped by 50% to ₹20.5 crore (equivalent to ₹21 crore or US$2.3 million in 2026) for a two-day total of ₹59.75 crore (equivalent to ₹62 crore or US$6.6 million in 2026). In its first weekend, the film grossed ₹76.5 crore (equivalent to ₹79 crore or US$8.4 million in 2026).

== Sequel ==
A third installment in the Akhanda franchise, titled Jai Akhanda, was teased during the sequel.
