= Mere Khwabon Mein Jo Aaye =

- Directed by: Madhureeta Anand
- Written by: Madhureeta Anand
- Produced by: Ajay Bijli; Sanjeev K. Bijli
- Starring: Randeep Hooda; Raima Sen; Arbaaz Khan
- Cinematography: Viraj Singh Gohil
- Edited by: Jabeen Merchant
- Music by: Lalit Pandit; Siddharath Coutto
- Distributed by: PVR Pictures
- Release date: 6 February 2009
- Running time: 136 minutes
- Country: India
- Language: Hindi

Mere Khwabon Mein Jo Aaye (lit. 'The one who comes in my dreams') is a 2009 Indian Hindi-language romantic drama film directed by Madhureeta Anand and starring Randeep Hooda, Raima Sen, and Arbaaz Khan. The title of the film was based on the song of the same name from Dilwale Dulhania Le Jayenge (1995).

== Cast ==
- Randeep Hooda as Jai Hoods
- Raima Sen as Maya V. Singh, Jai's love interest / Meera
- Arbaaz Khan as Vikram Singh, Maya's husband
- Suhasini Mulay as Mrs. Mathur
- Neil Bhoopalam as Ali
- Juhi Pandey as Tanya
- Javed Akhtar as a judge
- Ashwini Kalsekar as Mrs. Kapoor
- Eka Kumari Singh as Priya Singh, Maya and Vikram's daughter
- Anjan Srivastav as Mr. Mathur
- Lalit Pandit as a judge
- Alka Yagnik as a judge
- Murli Sharma as a concertgoer

== Production ==
Randeep Hooda was cast to play eighteen characters. He learned the flute and Raima Sen learned the harmonica.

== Soundtrack ==
Track-List
No.	Title	Singer(s)	Length
1.	"Pahle Toh Meri Inn Ankhon"	Shreya Ghoshal	4:26
2.	"Sehmi Sehmi"	Alka Yagnik, Lalit Pandit, Shaan, Runa Rizvi, Clinton Cerejo	4:40
3.	"Kabhi Kabhi"	Anushka Manchanda	4:05
4.	"Kab Talak"	Caralisa Monteiro	3:31
5.	"Pathraon Ke Bane In Shahron"	Shaan	4:57
6.	"Zindagi Me Nayi Bat Hone Ko"	Aishwarya Nigam	4:05
7.	"Sehmi Sehmi (Remix)"	Alka Yagnik, Lalit Pandit, Shaan, Runa Rizvi, Clinton Cerejo	4:06
8.	"Instrumental"	Lalit Pandit	3:28

== Release ==
The Hindustan Times gave the film a rating of one-and-half out of five stars and wrote that "If this film was meant to be about women’s empowerment, fantasy is a strange way to go. If it was meant to be a caper, the few laughs it raises are entirely unintentional". The Times of India gave the film the same rating and wrote that "Was it supposed to be about female empowerment, wish fulfilment, self-realisation or clandestine romance? Can't say, 'cause nothing really comes through in this completely garbled venture which sees Raima Sen sharing sweet nothings with ready-for-a-fancy-dress Randeep Hooda who happens to be as unreal as the film itself". Indian Express wrote that "This could have been a nice, light-hearted lark. What we get instead is a lost opportunity, top lining Arbaaz who doesn't get to crack a single smile, Raima who tries very hard to rise above the script, and major irritant Randeep, who changes costumes and strikes poses".
