= Rasheeduddin Khan =

Indian political scientist and politician

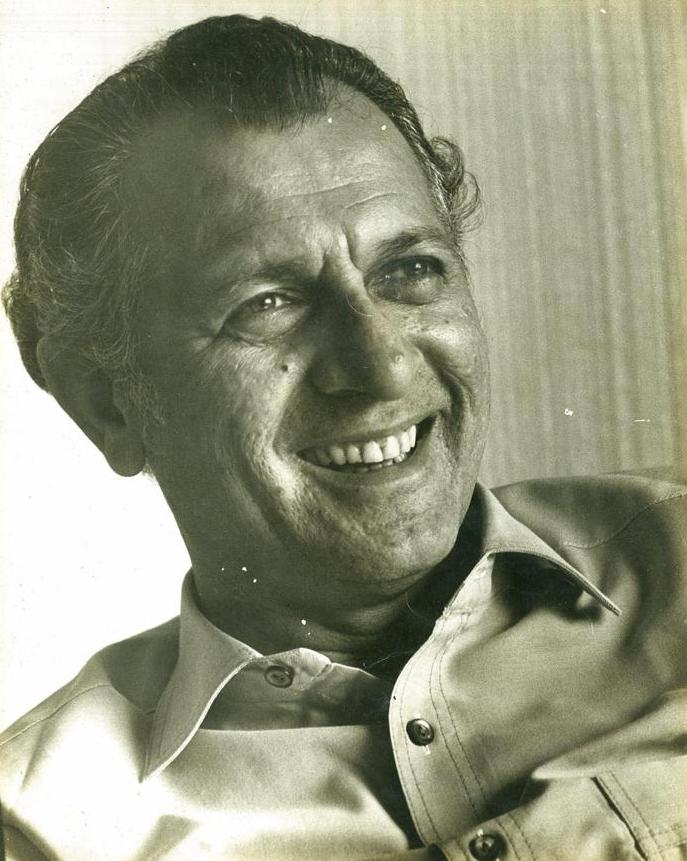
- Rasheeduddin Khan in the 1980s
- Born: 11 September 1924
- Died: 25 April 1996 (aged 71)
- Education: Nizam College; University of Madras; Delhi University
- Occupations: political scientist, author, professor
- Spouses: Hajra Bai Alladin (m. c.1950; died c.1965); Leela Narayan Rao
- Children: 2, including Kabir
- Writing career
- Subjects: Political science, Federalism

Rasheeduddin Khan (11 September 1924 – 25 April 1996) was an Indian author, educator, and parliamentarian.

== Early life and education ==
Khan was born into a Pathan family from Kaimganj in the Farrukhabad district of Uttar Pradesh. His family moved to Hyderabad when his father, Ghulam Akbar Yar Jung, was appointed a judge in the court of the Nizam of Hyderabad. He got his master's degree from Nizam College which was then affiliated with the University of Madras. He completed his doctoral studies at Delhi University.

== Career ==
From 1970 to 1989, he held the positions of Founder chairman and Professor at the Centre for Political Studies, Jawaharlal Nehru University. In addition, he played the role of Founder Director at the Centre for Federal Studies, Jamia Hamdard.

He served as a member of the Rajya Sabha for two terms: 1970 to 1976 and 1976–1982, representing India at the United Nations and other international forums. As a member of the Rajya Sabha, he held a position on the Public Accounts Committee during the years 1981–82, under the chairmanship of Satish Chandra Agarwal.

=== Federalism ===
Khan was recognized for his unwavering advocacy for a federal system of governance, establishing himself as a prominent scholar on the subject in the subcontinent. He expressed reservations regarding the social and cultural underpinnings of Indian federalism and the influence of politics on centralizing the country's federal system. He advocated for constitutional reforms that he believed were necessary to safeguard cooperative federalism from deteriorating into disintegrating federalism in the country.

According to Khan, the core essence of Indian federalism lies in regionalism. He contended that India can be best described as a multi-regional federation, and he rejected the notion that nationality and ethnicity alone can sufficiently explain the country's socio-cultural diversities. Khan emphasized that India's regions possess unique social, cultural, historical, linguistic, economic, and political characteristics. Therefore, he suggests that regional identity should be viewed as a holistic representation of the diverse nature of Indian society.

== Personal life ==
He was first married to Hajra Bai, daughter of Seth Abdullah Alladin of Sikandrabad, who was a stalwart devotee of the Ahmadiyya Movement in Islam and a successful businessman of the Alladin & Co (Soda and Ice Factory). He was married to Leela Narayan Rao, and together they had two children named Anusha Khan and Kabir Khan.

== Death ==
Khan died in 1996 at the age of 72 from natural causes.

== Publications ==
=== Books ===
- Khan, Rasheeduddin (1980). Endogenous Intellectual Creativity: The Ethos of the Composite Culture of India. Tokyo: United Nations University. ISBN 9789280801071.
- Khan, Rasheeduddin (1982). The Islamic Concept of Human Equality as an Axial Principle of Societal Transformation: Its Doctrinal Roots, Cross-cultural Permeation, and Interface with the Hindu Caste System. Tokyo: United Nations University. ISBN 9789280804577.
- Khan, Rasheeduddin (1992). Federal India: A Design for Change. New Delhi: Vikas Publishing House. ISBN 9780706959727. OCLC 614818232.
- Khan, Rasheeduddin (1994). Bewildered India: Identity, Pluralism, and Discord. New Delhi: Har-Anand Publications. ISBN 9788124101858.
- Khan, Rasheeduddin (1995). Sanghiye Bharat. New Delhi: Sāhitya Pablikeśanasa. ISBN 9788124102213.

=== Edited Books ===
- Khan, Rasheeduddin (1984). Composite Culture of India and National Integration. Shimla: Indian Institute of Advanced Study. ISBN 9788170231073.
- Khan, Rasheeduddin (1997). Rethinking Indian Federalism. Shimla: Indian Institute of Advanced Study. ISBN 9788185952505.

=== Textbooks ===
- Khan, Rasheeduddin (1990). Democracy in India: A Textbook in Political Science for Class 12. New Delhi: National Council of Educational Research and Training.

== In media ==
=== Books ===
- Abdulrahim, Vijapur P (1998). Dimensions of Federal Nation Building: Essays in Memory of Rasheeduddin Khan. New Delhi: Jamia Hamdard. ISBN 9788186562598. OCLC 39516142.
