= Rahul (film) =

2001 film directed by Prakash Jha

- Poster
- Directed by: Prakash Jha
- Screenplay by: Anuraadha Tewari
- Story by: Farhan
- Produced by: Subhash Ghai
- Starring: Jatin Grewal; Neha Bajpai; Rajeshwari Sachdev; Master Yash
- Cinematography: Arvind Kumar
- Edited by: Onir
- Music by: Anu Malik
- Distributed by: Mukta Arts
- Release date: 6 April 2001
- Country: India
- Language: Hindi

Rahul is a 2001 Indian Hindi-language drama film directed by Prakash Jha and produced by Subhash Ghai. The film stars Neha Bajpai, Jatin Grewal, Rajeshwari Sachdev and Yash Pathak.

== Synopsis ==
Mira comes from a wealthy family consisting of her parents and a brother, Rohit. She is in love with Akash Sharma, who is less wealthy, and wants to marry him. Akash, a handsome young man who seems to have neither family nor friends, runs his own small business of travel and tourism. Against the wishes of Mira's family, the couple gets married and begins a life full of love. They soon become the parents of a boy, and the birth of Rahul brings about a partial and insincere reconciliation: Mira's family is barely civil to Akash, but they help Mira to deal with pregnancy and early infant care.

To celebrate Rahul's first birthday, the couple hosts a party of their friends and invites Mira's family to join in the festivities. At the party, Mira's brother Rohit insults Akash to the core. This infuriates Akash, and he hits Rohit. Mira asks Akash to apologise to her brother for turning physical, but Akash refuses, saying that words can hurt more than fists. Mira's family forcibly takes her away from the party, and they compel her to leave behind her one-year-old son, Rahul. Akash and Mira get divorced in court. Mira's family convinces her that, if she insists on getting custody of Rahul, then Akash may kill her in vengeance. Mira believes them and yields custody to Akash. Their motive in doing all this is to ensure that Mira marries a person who is wealthy enough to suit them and starts a new family without carrying any visible or tangible burdens from the past.

Some four years pass. Rahul lives with his father, who has instilled the idea in him that his mother is very bad. However, Rahul finds out from Uncle John, a neighbour, that Mira is actually a very good person and that she lives in Mahabaleshwar with her parents. The five-year-old Rahul secretly goes and meets his mother. He finds out that she is very loving and caring towards him. Rahul and Mira continue to meet each other secretly. After getting Mira divorced and ensuring that she is not saddled with a child, Mira's family is trying to get her married to the wealthy and handsome Naveen. That plan gets stalled or postponed while Mira reconnects with her son.

Meanwhile, little Rahul often falls ill. The family doctor tells Akash that children need the care of a mother and urges him to marry again. A lady named Sheila is suggested as a suitable match. Akash initially rejects the suggestion but eventually agrees to meet Sheila, who turns out to be a caring and gentle lady. Both father and clueless son warm up to her. Akash begins to think seriously about marrying her and mentions the matter to little Rahul. Rahul likes Sheila, but he cannot accept her as his mother. Mira learns that Akash is preparing for a second marriage.

One day, Akash finds out that Mira and Rahul are in touch. He forces the kid to tell Mira that he hates her. This creates tremendous pressure on Rahul's mind, who gets drenched in rain and falls sick. This leads Akash and Mira to come to the hospital and confront each other. Mira then realizes that her family had been selfish all along and that Akash was not at fault. After Rahul is treated, the two get reunited for the sake of Rahul.

== Cast ==
- Yash Pathak as Rahul Sharma
- Jatin Grewal as Akash Sharma, Rahul's father
- Neha Bajpai as Mira Singh Sharma, Rahul's mother
- Rajeshwari Sachdev as Sheila Singh, Rahul's teacher
- Mahesh Thakur as Naveen Malhotra
- Gulshan Grover as Uncle John
- Parikshat Sahni as Doctor Uncle
- Manish Wadhwa as Rohit Singh, Mira’s brother
- Neena Kulkarni as Mrs. Singh
- Tanvi Hegde as Isha
- Rita Joshi
- Sudhir Mishra
- Vrajesh Hirjee as Isha's father

Additionally, Isha Koppikar appeared in an item number.

== Soundtrack ==
The music is composed by Anu Malik while the lyrics are penned by Anand Bakshi.

=== Track listing ===
No.	Title	Lyrics	Singer(s)	Length
1.	"A Song To Sing"	Anand Bakshi	Maria Goretti
2.	"Chalti Hai Purvai"	Anand Bakshi	Alka Yagnik, Mahalakshmi Iyer
3.	"Ched Na Mujhko"	Anand Bakshi	Hariharan, Kavita Krishnamurthy
4.	"Eh Kaash Aisa Hota"	Anand Bakshi	Ustad Sultan Khan
5.	"Kaise Bhool Jaati Hai"	Anand Bakshi	Sonali Bajpai
6.	"Piya Ki Jogan"	Anand Bakshi	Sunidhi Chauhan, Richa Sharma
7.	"Tu Mujhe Kaise Bhool Jaata Hai"	Anand Bakshi	Alka Yagnik
8.	"Vah Re Vah"	Anand Bakshi	Roop Kumar Rathod, Deepali Somaiya

== Critical response ==
Taran Adarsh of IndiaFM gave the film 1.5 out of 5, writing, "On the whole, RAHUL is not as impactful as it should've been. Weak in merits and face-value, the film will have a bumpy ride at the box-office." Ronjita Das of Rediff.com called the story "predictable" and further wrote that "the film has nothing to offer, with the oft-repeated storyline. Masoom and Akele Hum Akele Tum being two examples."
