= Screen Award for Best Child Artist =

Annual film award in India

The Screen Award for Best Child Artist is a new award conducted by the Star Screen Awards to recognise a great performance by a child actor in the previous year.

== Winners ==
Year	Actor	Film
1998	Kunal Khemu	Zakhm
2006	Ayesha Kapur	Black
2008	Darsheel Safary	Taare Zameen Par (Like Stars on Earth)
2009	Purav Bhandare	Tahaan
2010	Pratik Katare	Paa
2011	Ayaan Barodia	Udaan
2012	Partho Gupte	Stanley Ka Dabba
2013	Mohammad Samad	Gattu
2014	Japtej Singh	Bhaag Milkha Bhaag
2014	Parth Bhalerao	Bhoothnath Returns
2015	Harshaali Malhotra	Bajrangi Bhaijaan
2016	Riya Shukla	Nil Battey Sannata

== See also ==
- Screen Awards
