= The Silent Heroes =

- Theatrical release poster
- Directed by: Mahesh Bhatt
- Screenplay by: Dr Piyoosh Rautela; Rituraj Bhatt
- Produced by: Mahesh Bhatt; Kamal Birani
- Starring: Maanuv Bharadwaj; Priyanka Panchal; Mann Bagga; Simran Deep; Nirmal Kumar Pant
- Cinematography: Roopang Acharya
- Edited by: Alok Singh
- Music by: Rahul Mishra (songs); Ashish Jha (score)
- Production companies: Hans Productions; Reality Films
- Release date: 11 December 2015
- Running time: 117 minutes
- Country: India
- Language: Hindi

The Silent Heroes is a 2015 open captioned adventure drama that was directed by Mahesh Bhatt, based on a screenplay by Dr. Piyoosh Rautela and Rituraj Bhatt. The film was released on 11 December 2015 at the Dehradun Film Festival, to coincide with World Deaf Day, and has been billed as the "first commercial movie based on deaf children and enacted by real life deaf kids". It follows the adventures of thirteen deaf children and their perilous journey across the mountainous terrains of Uttarakhand.

The film is supported by National Disaster Management Authority (NDMA) and Disaster Management and Mitigation Centre (DMMC).

== Synopsis ==
The film follows a group of disabled children who set out to conquer the Himalayan mountains with their teacher. The children believe that through mountaineering, they can conquer not just their fears, but their disabilities as well. They are determined to prove that although they may be challenged, they are not disabled. However their trek leader doesn't believe this, as she believes them to be as capable or equal as hearing children, and actively tries to discourage them from continuing on throughout the course of the trek. When the leader is wounded and unable to proceed any further, the children fear that this will mean the end of their trip and their dreams of scaling the peaks and proving their worth to the world. Eventually, the children show tremendous mettle and skills in spite of the odds they face.

== Production ==
Filming took place in extreme surroundings and harsh conditions, and temperatures dropped as low as −12 °C. Despite safety precautions, the roads leading to the filming locations were blocked and the children's commute sequences were filmed in challenging conditions. The rafting sequence over the river Ganga was one of the most difficult tasks, as the water was at freezing temperature. Actor Nawazuddin Siddiqui has praised the child actors, particularly Khwaish Gupta, stating that "her determination has offered all of us a ray of learning to be inspired by".

== Cast ==
- Tarun Bhargawa as Tarun
- Gurfareen Bano as Gurfareen
- Khwaish Gupta as Khwaish
- Aashish Chauhan as Aashish
- Jaideep Rawat as Jaideep
- Mann Bagga as Dipankar
- Simran deep as Hima
- Maanuv Bharadwaj as Kapil
- Priyanka Panchal as Gauri
- Nirmal Pant as Col. Thapa

== Reception ==
The Hindu stated that "good intentions are not enough for good cinema" and that their "appreciation of the film or the lack of it rides on the way the makers have been milking the fact that its child actors are hearing and speech impaired and that they shot in tough conditions in the Himalayas." The Daily Star wrote a similar review, as they felt it was "a perfect example of how being myopic can play down noble intentions."

In contrast, The Statesman praised The Silent Heroes, stating that Bhatt "obviously managed to extract good performances from the children, who are a treat to watch. Their sincerity comes through in each scene. In fact they outshine their older and professional co-actors."
