= Madhureeta Anand =

Indian film writer and director

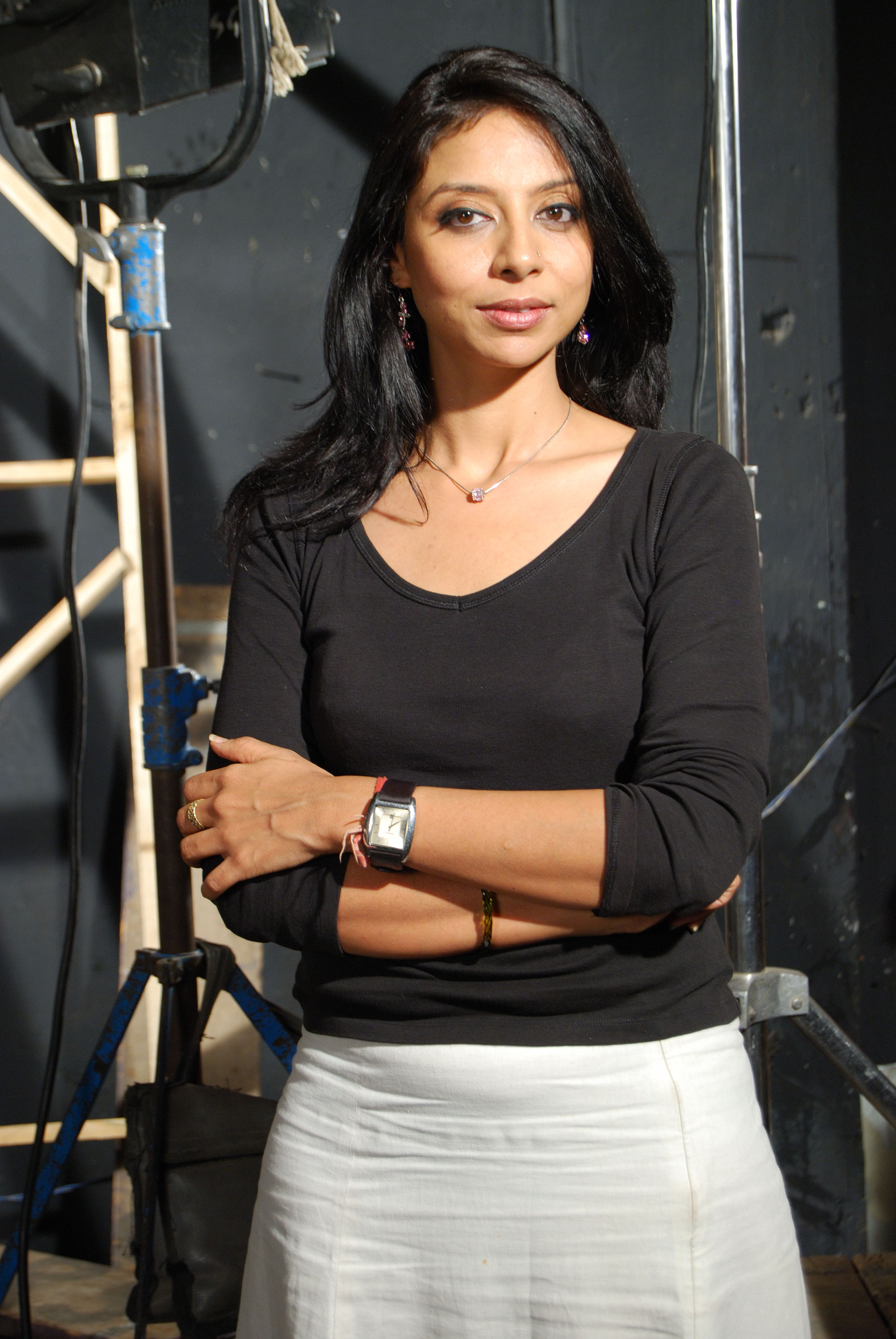
- Self-portrait photograph
- Occupations: Film director, producer, screenwriter
- Years active: 1995–present

Madhureeta Anand is an Indian independent film director, writer and producer. She has directed two feature films, written five feature films, directed many documentary films and series, spanning an array of genres. Many of her films have won national and international awards. She writes for various websites and magazines and has been featured in various books and other publications. She is also an activist for women's rights and rights of other minorities. She has consistently used her films and influence to support the causes of ending violence against women and children.

== Career ==
Kajarya was chosen as one of the top five films to see in 2014 by Forbes India Magazine and was described as:

"An assured second feature, and a strong, original voice about female foeticide in India, the film questions notions of women's emancipation, and explores how India lives in many centuries at the same time."

The film trailer launched in New Delhi, Jantar Mantar and Madhureeta chose this place because Jantar Mantar where all social movements have been launched.

Madhureeta Anand had started her career making documentaries. Later she went on and worked for various television shows where she soon realized that Television was not for her. She then formed her own company and started producing and directing documentaries, short films and then feature films.

=== Documentaries and Short films ===
Most of her work has explored the areas of culture, religion and anthropology. Some of her films have looked at issues of education and child abuse in India. Her films have been telecast on international channels such as BBC, Channel 4, Discovery and National Geographic.

=== The 0110 International Digital Film Festival ===
She is also the founder and festival director of the first Digital Film Festival in India – The 0110 International Digital Film Festival. The festival, started as collaboration with the British Council, Fame Cinemas and PVR Pictures, has well known filmmakers and actors on its jury.

=== Mere Khwabon Mein Jo Aaye ===
In 2007 she embarked on her first commercial feature film "Mere Khwabon Mein Jo Aaye" (The one she dreamt of). The film written, directed and executive produced by Madhureeta Anand in collaboration with PVR Pictures, and starred Raima Sen, Arbaaz Khan and Randeep Hooda. The film released on 6 February 2009.

=== Recurring themes ===
Most of Madhureeta's films tend to have strong female characters in the narrative. Her strong sense of gender politics comes through in her stories. All the films directed by her have been written by her and tend to use an active, engaging narrative to go much deeper. Her films, typically take the audience into a world that women inhabit making storytelling both unique and incisive.

=== Future projects ===
She is currently working on a feature-length documentary on the "Naga Sadhvis" for the European theatrical network with Austria based production company Navigator Films.

Her next feature film is titled Kotha No 22 (Brothel No 22), and is a thriller set in a brothel. Madhureeta will begin shooting the film in November 2014.

== Early life and education ==
Madhureeta Anand was born in New Delhi. Her father was an army officer and her mother a Kathak dancer who worked in television as a producer. Her father Col. V.K Pachauri was posted to various cities like Delhi, Pune and Udhampur. After her father died she moved with her mother Sarita and elder sister Mandakini to New Delhi and studied at The Modern School, Barakhamba Road for four years. She was 11 years old when her mother remarried Maj. V.K. Anand. She then took her step father's surname and went from being Madhureeta Pachauri to Madhureeta Anand. At age 11 she went to boarding school at The Lawrence School, Sanawar. She says, "It was a fortunate event that I ended up in a school that I loved and found friends that have become family. The school really shaped who I am". After school she studied sociology at Delhi University but hardly spent any time in the classroom. Most of her years in college were spent volunteering at The Spastics Society and in the villages of Orissa where she spent time with activists working to protect the rights of the villagers. During this time she also learnt German, photography and did a course in International Relations. After her graduation she went to film school at the Jamia Milia Islamia University where she learnt the ropes of film making.

== Filmography ==
Year	Name	Type	Note
2001	The Greatest Show on Earth – The Kumbh Mela	Documentary	(As Madhureeta Negi) She was the only woman camera director on a crew of directors on Channel 4 (UK)'s award-winning series
2002	Education – A reality or a myth	Documentary	
2002	Sin	Short Film	
2004	INS Tarangini	Mini Series	Also Producer (as Madhureetha Negi)
2006	Walking on a Moonbeam	Short film	
2009	Mere Khwabon Mein Jo Aaye	Feature Film	Director & Executive Producer
2013	Kajarya	Feature Film	Co-Producer

== Awards and recognition ==
- She won the Royal Television Society Craft Award for 'The Greatest Show on Earth – The Kumbh Mela' (2001).
- Her documentary feature on the Kumbh Mela- In Search of Salvation for the German Telecast Footprint (Austria/Switzerland/Germany) fetched her award for Excellence in Film Making at the Damah Film Festival at Seattle, USA in 2001. It was nominated at the Commonwealth Film Festival (Manchester, England) in 2002.
- Education – A reality or a myth was nominated at the Zanzibar International Film Festival in 2002.
- Sin was nominated in the Short Film section at The Damah Film Festival at Seattle (USA) in 2002.
- Walking on a Moonbeam won the Silver Conch at the Mumbai International Film Festival in 2006

== Writings ==
Madhureeta Anand has written 9 screenplays both in English and Hindi languages – Kajarya, Mere Khwabon Mein Jo Aaye (Hindi), O Mere Piya (Hindi), Decorate The Earth, Krishna Circus, Maharani, Kotha No 22 (Hindi), Sultana Daku and No Authority. She has been featured in “Poetry Of Purpose” a book that featured women achievers who made a social impact with their work.

Madhureeta had a column for India Today's online news portal Daily O where she regularly contributed for two years.

She was also a part of “Search of Sita” (edited by Namita Gokhale and Malashri Lall), an anthology of essays about the Goddess Sita. Her interview about her experience of making a film on Sita was featured as a part of this book.

Madhureeta Anand is one of the authors of a compilation of essays about Radha, the consort of the Indian deity Krishna, in the book “Finding Radha” (edited by Namita Gokhale and Malashri Lall).

== Activism ==
Madhureeta has a column "The Big M" on India Today's website DailyO.

Madhureeta has won the Karamveer award for her work that combines filmmaking with activism.
