= Lion of Gujarat =

- Directed by: Dinesh Lamba
- Written by: Dinesh Lamba
- Produced by: Jitendra Gohil
- Starring: Dinesh Lamba, DilavarKhan makrani Homi Wadia; Akruti Agrawal
- Release date: 26 June 2015
- Country: India
- Language: Hindi

Lion of Gujarat is a 2015 Bollywood action drama film directed by Dinesh Lamba and produced by Jitendra Gohil. It was the first Bollywood film shot entirely in Gujarat. It stars Dinesh Lamba, Homi Wadia and Akruti Agrawal in lead roles and Milan Vaidya, Manoj Parmar, Arman Tahil, Uday Danger, Yashpal, Gazal Rai, Bharat Thakkar in supporting roles. The movie was shot in Jamnagar, Porbandar and other parts of Gujarat, and was released on 26 June 2015.

== Cast ==
- Dinesh Lamba
- Homi Wadia
- Akruti Agrawal
- Milan Vaidya
- Manoj Parmar
- Arman Tahil
- Uday Danger
- Yashpal
- Gazal Rai
- Bharat Thakkar
- Dilavar Makrani
