= V. Vijayendra Prasad =

Indian screenwriter and film director

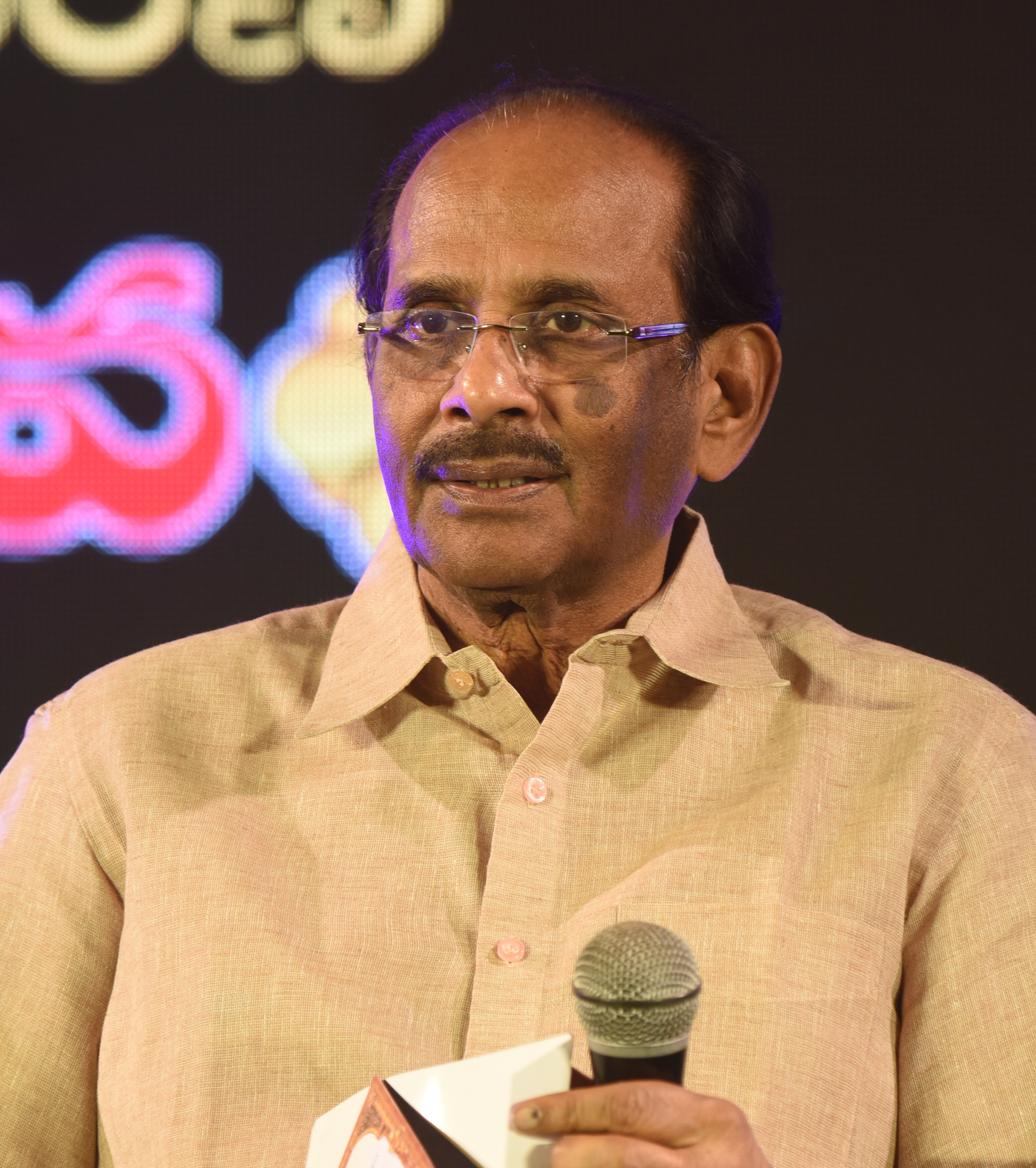
- Prasad in 2018

Member of Parliament, Rajya Sabha
- Incumbent
- Assumed office 7 July 2022
- Preceded by: Roopa Ganguly
- Constituency: Nominated (Cinema)

Personal details
- Born: Koduri Viswa Vijayendra Prasad; 27 May 1942 (age 84) Kovvur, Madras Presidency, British India (present-day Andhra Pradesh, India)
- Spouse: Raja Nandini
- Children: 2 including S. S. Rajamouli
- Occupation: Screenwriter; film director
- Writing career
- Years active: 1988–present
- Notable work: Full list

Koduri Viswa Vijayendra Prasad (born 27 May 1942) is an Indian screenwriter and film director who predominantly works in Telugu cinema. His filmography as a screenwriter consists of over 25 films. He is considered to be one of the most successful screenwriters of Indian cinema. He has frequently collaborated with his son, director S. S. Rajamouli, to deliver some of the highest-grossing Indian films of all time.

His notable work as a writer includes films like Bobbili Simham (1994), Magadheera (2009), Eega (2012), Baahubali duology (2015–2017), Bajrangi Bhaijaan (2015) and RRR (2022). In 2011, he has directed Rajanna, for which he won the Nandi Award for Best Feature Film. In 2016, he won the Filmfare Award for Best Story for Bajrangi Bhaijaan.

On 6 July 2022, President of India Ram Nath Kovind nominated him as a member of Rajya Sabha, the upper house of Indian Parliament.

== Early life ==
Prasad was born on 27 May 1942 in a Telugu family, in Kovvur near Rajahmundry, Andhra Pradesh. He studied at Sir C. R. Reddy College in Eluru.

Prasad's family had lands in Kovvur which were lost when the railway lines went through most of them. Then, Prasad moved to Karnataka from Kovvur in 1968. He, along with his elder brother K. V. Sivashankar, bought seven acres of paddy fields in Hirekotikal village of Manvi Taluk in Raichur district. Their family moved back to Kovvur in 1977. He also ventured into various businesses which ended up as losses.

== Career ==
His brother Siva Shakthi Datta's passion for films made Vijayendra Prasad and his family to shift to Madras. Datta assisted a couple of directors for some time and started a film titled Pillanagrovi which was stopped midway due to financial reasons. As his brother was already in the film industry, Prasad started assisting his brother.

Prasad got introduced to K. Raghavendra Rao through Samatha Arts' Mukherjee who was a friend of his. Raghavendra Rao started giving he and Datta small assignments. They got their first break with Janaki Ramudu (1988) which became successful at the box office.

Next, he wrote the film Bangaru Kutumbam (1994) which won the Nandi Award for Best Film. His next film was Bobbili Simham (1994) which was commercially successful and earned Prasad recognition as a screenwriter. He later provided the story for Samarasimha Reddy (1999) which became one of the biggest hits of the time in Telugu cinema.

== Personal life ==
Prasad married Raja Nandini. They have two children—a daughter who now lives in Australia and a son S. S. Rajamouli, a filmmaker. Prasad is uncle to music composers M. M. Keeravani, M. M. Srilekha, and Kalyani Malik.

Prasad dropped 'K' from his name, K. V. Vijayendra Prasad as he felt it was an indicator of his caste. He cited Hindu epics Mahabharata and Ramayana as a source of his inspiration. He cites 1957 Telugu film Mayabazar, as his all-time favourite film. He also cited the screenwriting duo Salim–Javed (Salim Khan and Javed Akhtar) as a major inspiration on his work, especially their screenplay for Sholay (1975), among other films. On 6 July 2022, Indian government nominated Prasad to the Rajya Sabha.

== Filmography ==
Key
†	Denotes films that have not yet been released

Year	Title	Story	Screenplay	Direction	Language	Notes
1988	Janaki Ramudu	Yes	No	No	Telugu	
1994	Bangaru Kutumbam	Yes	No	No	Telugu	
1994	Bobbili Simham	Yes	No	No	Telugu	
1995	Gharana Bullodu	Yes	Yes	No	Telugu	
1995	Aalu Magalu	Yes	Yes	No	Telugu	
1996	Ardhangi	Yes	Yes	Yes	Telugu	Directorial debut
1996	Sarada Bullodu	Yes	No	No	Telugu	Also dialogues
1996	Appaji	Yes	No	No	Kannada	
1998	Kurubana Rani	No	Yes	No	Kannada	
1998	Yuvarathna Rana	Yes	Yes	No	Telugu	
1999	Samarasimha Reddy	Yes	Yes	No	Telugu	
2000	Okkadu Chalu	Yes	No	No	Telugu	
2003	Simhadri	Yes	No	No	Telugu	
2004	Sye	Yes	No	No	Telugu	
2004	Vijayendra Varma	Yes	Yes	No	Telugu	
2005	Naa Alludu	Yes	Yes	No	Telugu	
2005	Chatrapathi	Yes	No	No	Telugu	
2005	Pandu Ranga Vittala	Yes	No	No	Kannada	
2006	Sri Krishna 2006	Yes	Yes	Yes	Telugu	
2006	Vikramarkudu	Yes	No	No	Telugu	
2007	Yamadonga	Yes	No	No	Telugu	
2009	Mitrudu	Yes	No	No	Telugu	
2009	Magadheera	Yes	No	No	Telugu	
2011	Rajanna	Yes	Yes	Yes	Telugu	
2012	Eega	Yes	No	No	Telugu; Tamil	
2015	Baahubali: The Beginning	Yes	No	No	Telugu; Tamil	
2015	Bajrangi Bhaijaan	Yes	Yes	No	Hindi	
2016	Jaguar	Yes	No	No	Kannada; Telugu	
2017	Baahubali 2: The Conclusion	Yes	No	No	Telugu	
2017	Srivalli	Yes	Yes	Yes	Telugu	
2017	Mersal	No	Yes	No	Tamil	
2019	Manikarnika: The Queen of Jhansi	Yes	Yes	No	Hindi	
2021	Thalaivii	No	Yes	No	Tamil; Hindi	
2022	RRR	Yes	No	No	Telugu	
2025	Baahubali: The Epic	Yes	No	No	Telugu	
2027	Varanasi †	Yes	No	No	Telugu	

=== Television ===
- Aarambh: Kahaani Devsena Ki (2017; StarPlus)

== Awards and nominations ==
Award	Year	Category	Work	Result	Ref.
Filmfare Awards	2016	Best Story	Bajrangi Bhaijaan	Won	
International Indian Film Academy Awards	2016	Best Story	Bajrangi Bhaijaan	Nominated	
International Indian Film Academy Awards	2016	Best Screenplay	Bajrangi Bhaijaan	Won	
Nandi Awards	2011	Second Best Feature Film	Rajanna	Won	
Producers Guild Film Awards	2015	Best Story	Bajrangi Bhaijaan	Won	
Screen Awards	2016	Best Story	Bajrangi Bhaijaan	Won	
Stardust Awards	2015	Best Story	Bajrangi Bhaijaan	Nominated	
Stardust Awards	2015	Best Screenplay	Bajrangi Bhaijaan	Nominated	
