= Jatin Grewal =

Indian restaurateur and former film actor

- Born: Nainital, Uttarakhand, India
- Occupations: Restaurateur; Model; Actor
- Spouse: Carolina Machi (m. 2010)

Jatin Grewal is an Indian restaurateur and a former model and actor known for his works in Hindi cinema and television.

== Early life ==
Grewal was born into a Punjabi speaking family in Nainital, Uttarakhand, India. He was raised in Chandigarh, studied management, and ventured into modelling. He won the runner-up trophy of the Gladrags Manhunt and Megamodel Contest 1998. During his modeling career he has appeared in commercials of brands like Kamasutra, Palmolive, Raymonds, Thumps-up, Levis, Cinthol, Indigo Nation, OCM, and Taj Hotels. He also appeared in Indian pop music videos.

== Restaurant ==
Grewal moved from India to the San Francisco Bay Area in 2018. In 2023, he opened Pippal, a pan-Indian restaurant in Emeryville. Following the success of this venture, he opened a second location in Dublin in 2025.

== Filmography ==
Year	Title	Role	Notes
2001	Rahul	Aakash	Debut
2002	Nee Sneham	Sreenu	Telugu film
2005	Chetna: The Excitement	Sameer	
2005	Film Star	Jatin	
2003	Palnati Brahmanayudu	Kumar Das	Telugu film
2008	Anamika	Sanjay	
2009	Meri Life Mein Uski Wife	Aakash	
2011	Sheetal Bhabhi	Aakash	
2012	Luv U Soniyo	Vikram	
2013	Shortcut Romeo	Ashish	
2015	International Hero	Jatin	
2016	Desi Munde	Jatin	Punjabi film

== Music Videos ==
Grewal also appeared in Hindi and Punjabi compositions by Indian pop artists such as Pankaj Udhas, Ila Arun, Nazia Hassan, and Roopkumar Rathod to name a few.

- 2003 - Kyon Baheka Re Baheka Re Adhi Raat Ko
- 2002 - 8 PM Bermuda: Mausam Mastana
- 2001 - Jab Andhera Hota Hai (Remix)
- 2001 - Aag
- 2001 - Dil Hain Ki Manta Nahin (Remix)
- 2000 - Chori Chori Ki Woh
- 2000 - Fulkaari
- 2000 - Woh Mera Hoga
- 2000 - Rehan De Phulkari
- 2000 - Har Baat Pe Hairaan Hai Moorakh Hai Yeh Nadaan
- 1999 - O Sahiba
