= Lakhon Hain Yahan Dilwale =

Lakhon Hain Yahan Dilwale लाखों हैं यहाँ दिलवाले
- Directed by: Munnawar Bhagat
- Written by: Munnawar Bhagat
- Screenplay by: Munnawar Bhagat Associate Director = Shashikant Mena
- Produced by: Munnawar Bhagat
- Starring: See below
- Cinematography: Kasturi Shelar
- Edited by: R. Ghaadi
- Music by: Various Artists
- Production company: Meera Shamim Films
- Distributed by: Meera Shamim Films
- Release date: 4 September 2015
- Running time: 114 minutes
- Country: India
- Language: Hindi

Lakhon Hain Yahan Dilwale (Hindi: लाखों हैं यहाँ दिलवाले English: Here are millions hearted) is an Indian 2015 romantic film directed and produced by Munnawar Bhagat under the Meera Shamim Films banner. The film was released on 4 September 2015.

== Cast ==
- Vije Bhatia
- Krutika Gaekwad
- Aditya Pancholi
- Arun Bakshi
- Anju Mahendroo
- Kishori Shahane

== Plot ==
The story of the film is about a young man named Arsh (Vije Bhatia) whose passion is singing and whose love are the songs from the era of 60s. To fulfill his dreams, he comes to Mumbai.

== Reception ==
The film did not get a good response from many audiences. Rahul Desai of Catch News said "Lakhon Hain Yahan Dilwale drowns in its bubble of timelessness."
