= Kajarya =

- Directed by: Madhureeta Anand
- Written by: Madhureeta Anand
- Screenplay by: Madhureeta Anand
- Story by: Madhureeta Anand
- Produced by: Tilak Sarkar; Madhureeta Anand; Celine Loop; Q
- Starring: Meenu Hooda; Ridhima Sud; Kuldeep Ruhil; Shashi Bhushan
- Cinematography: Alok Upadhyay
- Edited by: Manas Mittal; Anupama
- Music by: Richard Horowitz
- Production companies: Ekaa Films; Starfire Movies; Odd Joint Films
- Release date: 4 December 2015
- Running time: 132 minutes
- Country: India
- Language: Hindi

Kajarya is a 2015 Indian Bollywood docudrama film directed by Madhureeta Anand. Kajarya explores the issue of female infanticide, and was released commercially in India on 4 December 2015 to rave reviews and good audience reception. The film is co-produced by Bengali director Qaushiq Mukherjee popularly known as Q, Starfire movies and Madhureeta Anand's company Ekaa Films. The film is shot in Haryana.

It is a feature film that deals with the pertinent topic of sex selection in India. It is a thriller about two women – The first is Kajarya played by Meena Hooda, a woman who lives in the village and has the job of killing babies and the other is an opportunistic journalist from New Delhi played by Ridhima Sud.

== Cast ==
- Meenu Hooda as Kajarya
- Ridhima Sud as Meera
- Nasir Ali as Sub-Inspector
- Manoj Bakshi as Police Inspector
- Shashi Bhushan as Shambhu
- Sudheer Chobessy as Girdhari
- Tanaji Dasgupta as Priest's Assistant
- Priyankar Tanwar Isha as Lady Constable
- Shakeel Qureshi as Priest
- Savita Rani as Uma
- Kuldeep Ruhil as Banwari
- Raj Shree as Meera's Mother
- Kamal Vinayak as Meera's Father
- Sumeet Vyas as Nikhil

== Soundtrack ==
The film's music has been scored by Richard Horowitz, who is a Golden Globe Award winner and an Academy Award nominee. The film was one of the three Indian films selected to be premiered at the 10th Dubai International Film Festival, 2013 that celebrated the 100 years of Indian cinema.

== Release ==
Kajarya had its World Premiere at the 16th Dubai International Film Festival held during 6 December to 14 December in the year 2013. In India the film was released on 4 December 2015.

== Critical reception ==
Deborah Young of The Hollywood Reporter found Kajarya to be "disturbing and engrossing" and said that, "A chilling social study of infanticide is brought to life through the viewpoint of two women." Saibal Chatterjee of NDTV gave the film a rating of 4 out of 5 saying that, "Kajarya is a powerful and important film that finds vestiges of genuine humanity in an area of impenetrable darkness. But it offers no false hopes. This film is for discerning audiences who have a stomach for the bitter truth." Mohar Basu of The Times of India gave the film a rating of 2.5 out of 5 and said that, "Kajarya is a lethal film that has its heart in the right place. It is both engrossing and abhorrent, addressing the issue of female infanticide with an astute understanding of the subject." Namrata Joshi of The Hindu praised the director for her earnest and sincere effort but also criticized the film for being low on intensity. The critic said that, "There are many stories that lie hidden in the depressing newspaper headlines. The art is in giving them a compelling, emotional shape on screen. Madhureeta Anand succeeds but marginally so in Kajarya." Shubha Shetty-Saha of Mid-Day gave the film a rating of 3.5 out of 5 and said that, "Dark, straight narration with excellent performances work for the film. It is a sincere attempt to bring forth an issue that is very much a part of this country and the one we must be really worried about." Mehul S Thakkar of Deccan Chronicle gave the film a rating of 2 out of 5 and said that, "The film is not easy to the eye and is disturbing". The critic praised the acting performances of all actors but criticized the inconsistent screenplay saying that it made the film "less engaging".

== Awards and accolades ==
The film was seen by Eve Ensler (writer of The Vagina Monologues) and was greatly appreciated by her. The film has an all-new star cast of trained actors and explores the issue of female foeticide and related women's issues.

- The film premiered at The Dubai International Film Festival as one of the 3 Indian films that had its world premier there.
- The Film's Europe Premier took place in Geneva at The International Film Festival and Forum on Human Rights where Kajarya was one of the 8 films in competition.
- The film was the opening film at Elles Tournet in Brussels, a prestigious women's film festival.
- In addition, the film was selected at The Montreal World Film Festival.
- Kajarya also won the "Best Foreign Film Award" at The Silk Road Film Festival in Xian, China. The festival had 140 films and Kajarya was the only Indian film to win an award.
- The film has since traveled to 10 other film festivals in America and Europe.
- Kajarya was screened in Los Angeles at both The Lady Film Festival and The LA Femme Film Festival.

The Hollywood reporter review said, "Kajarya is both disturbing and engrossing as it plunges the viewer into the heart of darkness in an Indian village. Director Madhureeta Anand is a storyteller who interweaves the lives of two women – one modern, the other ancient."

== Activism ==
Madhureeta Anand has consistently used her influence and films to advocate causes related to gender, sexuality and child rights. Her film Kajarya was backed by 21 NGOs in India and abroad. The film has become a tool for activism and to provoke discussion. The film is slated to be screened in the Parliament. Kajarya is now being quoted as an example of the coming together of social causes and entertainment. She frequently writes columns and articles voicing her views on these subjects. She has formed "The Two Way Street Trust" to bridge the gap between social issues and entertainment.
