= Harshaali Malhotra =

Indian child actress (born 2008)

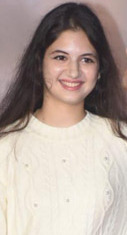
- Harshaali in 2022
- Born: 3 June 2008 (age 18); Mumbai, Maharashtra, India
- Education: Seven Square Academy, Mumbai
- Occupations: Actress; Model
- Years active: 2012-Present
- Notable work: Bajrangi Bhaijaan (2015)

Harshaali Malhotra (born 3 June 2008) is an Indian actress and model who works in Hindi films and television series. She is best known for her role as Munni in Kabir Khan's drama film Bajrangi Bhaijaan (2015) which earned her nomination for a Filmfare Award for Best Female Debut.

== Early life ==
Harshaali was born on 3 June 2008 in Mumbai, Maharashtra, India into a Punjabi Hindu family of Khatri caste.

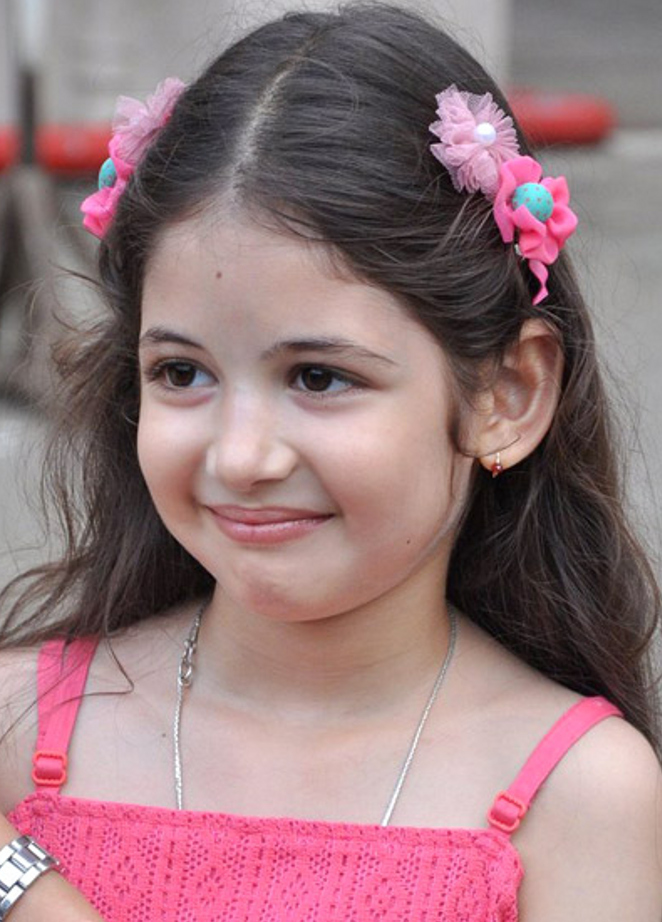
Malhotra in 2015

== Career ==
Malhotra made her film debut with a leading role in Kabir Khan's 2015 drama film Bajrangi Bhaijaan, alongside Salman Khan, Kareena Kapoor and Nawazuddin Siddiqui. She played the role of Shahida also known as 'Munni', a Pakistani Muslim girl. Her performance as a mute girl was critically praised and earned her the Filmfare Award for Best Female Debut nomination, making her the youngest person to be nominated in the category and won the Screen Award for Best Child Artist among several other awards and nominations. She also received the Bharat Ratna Dr. Ambedkar Award in 2022 for her performance in Bajrangi Bhaijaan.

She has acted in serials such as Qubool Hai (2014) and Laut Aao Trisha (2014).

== Filmography ==
Key
†	Denotes films that have not yet been released

=== Films ===
Year	Title	Role	Language	Ref.
2015	Bajrangi Bhaijaan	Shahida "Munni" Aziz	Hindi	Debut film
2025	Akhanda 2: Thaandavam	Janani	Telugu	Telugu Debut
TBA	Nastik †	Aalia	Hindi	
TBA	Swadeshi Dharam to the World †	Hansaali		

=== Television ===
Year	Title	Role	Notes
2012	Qubool Hai	Young Zoya Farooqui	
2012	Laut Aao Trisha	Sania Swaika	
2012	Savdhaan India	Honey	
2017	Sabse Bada Kalakar	Herself	Guest

== Awards and nominations ==
Year	Award	Category	Film	Result
2015	Big Star Entertainment Awards	Most Entertaining Child Artist	Bajrangi Bhaijaan	Won
2015	Big Star Entertainment Awards	Most Entertaining Actor (Film) - Female	Bajrangi Bhaijaan	Nominated
2015	Star Guild Awards	Best Child Artist	Bajrangi Bhaijaan	Won
2015	Star Guild Awards	Best Debut Female	Bajrangi Bhaijaan	Nominated
2015	Filmfare Awards	Best Debut Female	Bajrangi Bhaijaan	Nominated
2015	Stardust Awards	Best Child Artist	Bajrangi Bhaijaan	Won
2015	Screen Awards	Best Child Artist	Bajrangi Bhaijaan	Won
2015	Zee Cine Awards	Best Debutant Female	Bajrangi Bhaijaan	Won
