= Bajrangi Bhaijaan =

2015 Indian Hindi film by Kabir Khan

- Theatrical release poster
- Directed by: Kabir Khan
- Screenplay by: Kabir Khan; Parveez Sheikh; V. Vijayendra Prasad
- Story by: V. Vijayendra Prasad
- Dialogue by: Kabir Khan Kausar Munir
- Produced by: Salman Khan; Rockline Venkatesh; Kabir Khan
- Starring: Salman Khan; Harshaali Malhotra; Kareena Kapoor Khan Nawazuddin Siddiqui
- Cinematography: Aseem Mishra
- Edited by: Rameshwar S. Bhagat
- Music by: Score: Julius Packiam; Songs: Pritam
- Production companies: Salman Khan Films; Rockline Entertainments; Kabir Khan Films
- Distributed by: Eros International
- Release date: 17 July 2015
- Running time: 159 minutes
- Country: India
- Language: Hindi
- Budget: ₹75 crore
- Box office: ₹918 crore

Bajrangi Bhaijaan (transl. Brother Bajrangi) is a 2015 Indian Hindi-language comedy drama musical film co-written and directed by Kabir Khan, based on an original story by screenwriter V. Vijayendra Prasad, and produced by Salman Khan, Rockline Venkatesh and Kabir Khan. The film stars Salman with debutante Harshaali Malhotra, Kareena Kapoor Khan and Nawazuddin Siddiqui, and tells the story of Pawan Kumar Chaturvedi, a devotee of the Hindu deity Hanuman, who embarks on a journey to take a mute six-year-old Pakistani Muslim girl Shahida, separated in India from her mother, back to her hometown.

Made on a budget of ₹75 crore (US$11.69 million), the principal photography commenced in November 2014. The cinematography was done by Aseem Mishra and was edited by Rameshwar S. Bhagat. Julius Packiam composed the film score while the songs featured in the film were composed by Pritam.

Bajrangi Bhaijaan received widespread critical acclaim upon release. Critics praised its storyline, dialogues, music, cinematography, direction, and cast performances, particularly those of Salman Khan, Siddiqui, and Malhotra; the film became a commercial success, grossing ₹918.18 crores worldwide, and is currently the seventh highest-grossing Hindi film. It was also the highest-grossing Indian film of the year. It won the National Film Award for Best Popular Film Providing Wholesome Entertainment at the 63rd National Film Awards and was nominated for 4 awards at the 61st Filmfare Awards, including Best Film, Best Director (Kabir Khan) and Best Actor (Salman Khan), and won Best Story (V. Vijayendra Prasad). It was also nominated for Best Foreign Film in China's 2015 Douban Film Awards.

== Plot ==
In a mountainous village in Sultanpur, Azad Kashmir, Pakistan, Shahida, a six-year-old mute girl, falls from a cliff. Though rescued, her inability to speak leaves her stranded for hours. Desperate for a cure, her mother, Razia, takes her to the Nizamuddin Auliya shrine in Delhi, India. On their return journey, the train halts for repairs near the border. Shahida steps off to rescue a trapped sheep, but the train departs without her. Stranded in India, she boards a freight train that takes her to Haryana.

Shahida encounters Pawan Kumar Chaturvedi, a devout Hindu Brahmin and an ardent devotee of Lord Hanuman living in Delhi. Noticing her disability and assuming she is lost, Pawan names her "Munni" and takes her in. Pawan lives with his father's friend, Pandey, whose daughter, Rasika, is Pawan's fiancée. Pandey is deeply conservative and skeptical of the girl's origins, but Pawan rationalizes that her fair skin indicates a Brahmin background. However, Munni's preference for meat and her eventual entry into a mosque reveal her Muslim identity. Later, while watching a cricket match, Munni cheers for Pakistan, confirming her nationality.

Furious, Pandey demands her removal. Pawan tries the Pakistani embassy, but a riot suspends all visa processing. He then turns to a travel agent, handing over the savings meant for his future home with Rasika. When Pawan discovers the agent actually sold Munni to a brothel, he overcomes his pacifism, thrashes the traffickers, and resolves to personally escort Munni back to Pakistan without a passport or visa.

Assisted by a border smuggler, Pawan breaches the frontier. His rigid honesty leads him to demand permission from Pakistani border guards, resulting in a severe beating before they reluctantly let him pass. In Pakistan, Pawan is arrested under suspicion of being an Indian spy after Munni playfully steals a policeman's handcuffs. Chand Nawab, a struggling local journalist, initially seeks to exploit the "spy" story but realizes Pawan's innocence after witnessing his dedication to Munni.

Nawab decides to help them, documenting their journey while evading the police. They receive shelter from a sympathetic Islamic scholar, Azad, who helps them disguise themselves in burqas to escape the city. When mainstream television channels reject Nawab's heartwarming footage as unnewsworthy, he uploads the videos to YouTube.

Reviewing old footage, Munni spots her mother on a bus. Nawab identifies the route, leading them to her home village in Sultanpur. As the police close in, Pawan distracts them, allowing Nawab to safely reunite Munni with her parents, while Pawan is captured and tortured in custody.

Nawab's video detailing Pawan's sacrifice goes viral, sparking massive public outcries in both India and Pakistan. Under immense international and public pressure, Pakistani officials agree to release Pawan at the Narowal border crossing. Thousands of citizens from both nations gather at the gates. As Pawan walks back toward India, Munni, running to the fence, overcomes her speech impediment through sheer emotion and calls out to him. Pawan turns back, and the two share an emotional embrace across the border.

== Cast ==
- Salman Khan as Pawan Kumar Chaturvedi a.k.a. Bajrangi Bhaijaan, a Hindu Brahmin hailing from Pratapgarh who has been living in Delhi since his father Diwakar's death
  - Najeem Khan as teenage Pawan
- Harshaali Malhotra as Shahida "Munni" Aziz, a mute Pakistani girl who gets lost in India and bumps into Pawan, who makes it his mission to take her back home
- Kareena Kapoor Khan as Rasika Pandey, Dayanand and Archana's daughter and Pawan's love interest and fiancé
- Nawazuddin Siddiqui as Chand Nawab, a Pakistani news reporter and Pawan's later ally, based on a real-life Pakistani reporter with the same name
- Sharat Saxena as Dayanand Pandey, Archana's husband and Rasika's father, Diwakar's childhood friend
- Alka Badola Kaushal as Archana Pandey, Dayanand's wife and Rasika's mother
- Meher Vij as Razia Aziz, Rauf's wife and Shahida's mother who ends up losing her in the train
- Kushaal Pawar as Kamil Yusuf, Chand Nawab's cameraman caught by police to get information about Pawan and Chand Nawab
- Mir Sarwar as Rauf Aziz, Razia's husband and Shahida's father.
- Kamlesh Gill as Farookh Zehrullah, passenger in the train with Razia & Shahida
- Om Puri as Maulana Azad, a religious scholar
- Adnan Sami as a singer in the song "Bhardo Jholi Meri" (special appearance)
- Rajesh Sharma as Hamid Khan, a Pakistani senior police officer
- Krunal Pandit as Vardhan, travel agent in Delhi
- Mursaleen Qureshi as Boosmaan "Boo" Ali, smuggler at India-Pakistan's border who helps Pawan and Munni to cross the border illegally
- Manoj Bakshi as Police Inspector Iqbal Qureshi
- Harssh A. Singh as Shamsher Ali, Pakistani news channel head and Chand Nawab's boss
- Yudhvir Dahiya as Pankaj Verma, reporter of NDTV
- Atul Srivastava as Diwakar Prasad Chaturvedi, Pawan's father and Dayanand's childhood friend, who chided Pawan for his failures

== Production ==
The climax scene was shot at Thajiwas Glacier in Sonamarg, Jammu and Kashmir.

=== Development ===
The film's story writer V. Vijayendra Prasad stated that the idea of the film was inspired by the 1987 Telugu film Pasivadi Pranam, which itself is a remake of the Malayalam film Poovinu Puthiya Poonthennal (1986). Prasad also took inspiration from a story he heard about a Pakistani couple coming to India for their daughter's heart surgery. It has also been noted that the core plot is equivalent to that of the 2006 Kannada movie Kallarali Hoovagi.

Kabir Khan noted that the script of Bajrangi Bhaijaan was influenced by some of his own experiences. He noted the influence of the Hindu epic Ramayana, which he used to watch Ramlila plays of as a child, and particularly the Hindu deity Bajrangi (Hanuman), who left a strong impression on him as a child. He felt that Bajrangi was a character who was loved by people all religious communities in India, including Hindus and Muslims in India, due to how Bajrangi brought joy and fun to many Indian children. Khan began writing Bajrangi Bhaijaan partly in response to the rise of religious sectarianism in India since the 1980s and particularly in response to the Bajrang Dal, a Hindu fundamentalist organisation that appropriated Bajrangi for violent sectarian motives and played a central role in the deadly 2002 Gujarat riots, leading to the name Bajrangi having communal connotations. He began writing Bajrangi Bhaijaan in 2013 as a way of reclaiming Bajrangi for all communities, and as a way of bringing Hindus and Muslims together.

The film's casting director was Mukesh Chhabra.

=== Principal photography ===
The principal photography began on 3 November 2014 in New Delhi, with Salman Khan and Kareena Kapoor Khan participating. The second filming schedule took place at the ND Studios, Karjat. The third schedule of the film was held in Mandawa, Rajasthan. On 7 January 2015, Khan was seen on the top of the castle of Mandawa playing cricket with a young boy. On 10 January 2015, Khan shot with school students in Rajasthan's Jhunjhunu district. Shooting of the film was completed on 20 May. Some scenes of the film were shot at Khan's Panvel farm house. Shooting also took place in the Kashmir Valley in places like Sonamarg and Zoji La. The film's climax was shot at Sonmarg near the Thajiwas glacier (at 10,000 ft above sea level) with around 7,000 people. Nawazuddin Siddiqui's character Chand Nawab was inspired by a real character Chand Nawab, who was with Karachi-based Indus News in 2008.

== Music ==
A. R. Rahman was initially in talks to compose the music of the film, however he did not sign the film. The music was then composed by Kabir Khan's usual collaborators, with Pritam composing the songs and Julius Packiam composing the score. The lyrics were written by Mayur Puri, Amitabh Bhattacharya, Neelesh Misra, Shabbir Ahmed, and Kausar Munir while Julius Packiam composed the score. The soundtrack of the movie become Super Hit. The Song "Bhar Do Jholi" one of the biggest hits of 2015 sang by Adnan Sami. The soundtrack album consists of eleven tracks, was released on 17 June 2015. "Tu Chahiye" and "Selfie Le Le Re" become chartbusters.

The film includes the qawwali "Bhar Do Jholi Meri Ya Muhammad" originally written by Purnam Allahabadi and composed and sung by the Sabri Brothers. The qawwali was revamped with the voice of Adnan Sami Khan and partly includes "Dam Ali Ali". EMI Pakistan and Amjad Sabri heir to the Sabri Brothers, have called for legal action against the producers of the film and the qawwali in separate instances.

== Release ==
Initially announced as an Eid 2014 release, the film was rescheduled to 12 January 2014. Bajrangi Bhaijaan was released on 17 July 2015, one day before Eid, on 4,500 screens in India and 1,000 screens in overseas respectively. The film was also released in 50 countries outside India, on more than 700 screens.

In November 2017, it was announced that Bajrangi Bhaijaan was set to release in China, following the success of Aamir Khan's Dangal (2016) in the country. In December 2017, it was announced the film would release there in 2018. Prior to the announcement, Bajrangi Bhaijaan had a cult following in China, where it has an average rating of 8.6 out of 10 on the popular film site Douban, with over 70,000 votes. It placed fourth on Douban's list of top foreign films of 2015. Bajrangi Bhaijaan was released in China under the title 小萝莉的猴神大叔 which roughly translates as "Little Lolita's Monkey God Uncle"; "monkey god" is a rough translation of "Bajrangi" while "little lolita" and "uncle" reference the characters. The Chinese version was also cut down in length to 140 minutes.

In January 2018, it was announced that the film would be getting a wide release, on 8,000 screens in China, building on the Chinese box office success of Aamir Khan's Dangal and Secret Superstar (2017), and Bajrangi Bhaijaan's positive word-of-mouth. The film released in China on 2 March 2018. On 6 February 2018, the film had advance screenings in 29 Chinese cities, receiving a positive reception from audiences. It also had a limited preview on 25 February 2018. The film's China premiere on 27 February 2018 was attended by Kabir Khan and Harshali Malhotra. Its release date of 2 March 2018 marks the Lantern Festival, which celebrates families coming together.

It was released in Turkey on 17 August 2018 on 190 screens. In the first weekend it grossed approx $89,796 with a spectator count of 8,389. The film released in Japan on 18 January 2019, with the title "バジュランギおじさんと、小さな迷子", which translates as "Uncle Bajrangi and a small lost child" (Bajurangi ojisan to, chīsana maigo). The film was marketed by a Mumbai-based company named Spice PR owned by Prabhat Choudhary. Bajrangi Bhaijaan Movie Game, an action-adventure mobile video game based on the film was developed by Playizzon and released along with the film.

== Reception ==
On the review aggregator website Rotten Tomatoes, 88% of 17 critics' reviews are positive, with an average rating of 6.4/10.

In India, Bollywood Hungama gave the film 4.5 out of 5 stars, writing that "this film easily qualifies to be Salman Khan's best movie till date, featuring his career's best performance. The film wins you over completely". Srijana Mitra Das of Times of India gave the film 4 out of 5 stars, writing that "Bajrangi Bhaijaan is Salman Khan's most daring film where Salman presents a beautiful performance - but allows the story to be the real "dabangg" ".Rachit Gupta for Filmfare wrote that "If movies are meant to inspire, then Bajrangi Bhaijaan fulfills its purpose with resounding success", giving the movie 3.5 out of 5 stars. Raja Sen of Rediff.com gave a 3.5 out of 5 star rating explaining that "Bajrangi Bhaijaan is an overearnest, oversimplified, preposterously sweet and frequently schlocky film, which shouldn't work because of how predictable and soppy it is. Yet, because of a finely picked supporting cast, some sharp lines of dialogue and, most crucially, because of its overall heart, it works, and works well." Rajeev Masand of CNN-IBN gave 3 stars out of 5, commenting "Bajrangi Bhaijaan is way too long at 2 hours and 35 minutes, and could have done with some serious pruning, especially in its first half. Nevertheless, it's more engaging than such typical Salman Khan blockbusters as Bodyguard and Ready, if only because it has a sliver of a story, and its heart in the right place." Anupama Chopra of Hindustan Times said "Bajrangi Bhaijaan is simplistic, occasionally silly, and tiringly over-stretched. It's also unashamedly manipulative. But it works. Director and co-writer Kabir Khan preserves the larger-than-life Salman image but also allows it to evolve so that the star is not just a slick superman." Uday Bhatia for Mint wrote: "To say Bajrangi Bhaijaan is geared towards maximum emotional impact is an understatement. It is engineered for it. Its parts have been carefully assembled so as to make you laugh every other scene, tear up every 10 minutes"; further praising Harshaali Malhotra, he goes "Who says you need a girl and a gun to make a movie? This film proves that you only need the former, provided she's a criminally cute six-year-old". Similarities were noted between the core plot element of this movie and the 2006 Kannada movie Kallarali Hoovagi.

Overseas too, the film received positive reviews from Chinese critics. Several critics in China, where it was released as Little Lolita's Monkey Uncle, noted narrative parallels to the 16th century Chinese epic Journey to the West and its monkey-king hero Sun Wukong (which in turn have similarities to the 4th century BC Hindu epic Ramayana and its monkey-god hero Hanuman), making the film relatable to Chinese audiences. The film's theme of connecting people across nations, religions and ethnicities also resonated with Chinese audiences. In Japan, upon release in January 2019, it was the week's highest-rated film on the Filmarks audience satisfaction survey.

=== Box office ===
Bajrangi Bhaijaan went on to gross ₹444.92 crore (US$69.35 million) in India and ₹473.26 crore (US$73.77 million) overseas for a worldwide total gross of ₹969.9 crore (US$151.19 million).

Territories	Gross revenue
India	₹444.92 crore ($69.27 million)
Pakistan	Rs. 54.01 crore (US$5.33 million)
Arab States of the Persian Gulf	US$9,444,460 (₹60.28 crore)
United States and Canada	US$8,187,000 (₹52.2 crore)
United Kingdom	£2,662,115 (US$4,150,476)
Australia	A$1,700,006 (US$1,249,785)(₹8 crore)
New Zealand	NZ$579,447 (US$404,084)
Hong Kong	HK$1,364,088 (US$175,558)
China	$45,534,364 (₹296.06 crore+)
Japan	$196,062 (₹1.39 crore)
Turkey	$44,640 (₹31.2 lakh)

=== India ===
Bajrangi Bhaijaan film grossed around ₹27.25 crore in India on the first day of release, and further showed growth on its second and third day for an opening weekend total nett of ₹102.60 crore. Film went on to collect a total lifetime nett of ₹320.34 crore and total gross of ₹444.92 crore in India.

=== Overseas ===
Bajrangi Bhaijaan grossed $8 million in the first weekend, and a total lifetime gross of $74.4 million in overseas markets. The film has grossed around $2.45 million in its first weekend in US-Canada. Bajrangi Bhaijaan grossed Rs. 4.5 crore ($444,000) in Pakistan in its first 3 days of its release, and subsequently Rs. 6 crore ($592,000) in the first week. The ten-day overseas gross of Bajrangi Bhaijaan was over US$17 million. At the end of two weeks, Bajrangi Bhaijaan grossed US$20 million in overseas. Bajrangi Bhaijaan grossed around $23.5 million in overseas in 17 days. Bajrangi Bhaijaan set an all-time record in the Persian Gulf region with collections of ₹47.9 crore (US$7.47 million) to become the highest-grossing film in the territory, beating films like Happy New Year and Dhoom 3. The film is also the biggest Salman Khan film in the Persian Gulf, beating the previous best of Kick which grossed around $4.1 million. The film has done excellent across all overseas markets, according to Box Office India.

Bajrangi Bhaijaan grossed £2,662,115 ($4,067,120) in the United Kingdom, where it became the highest-grossing foreign-language film of 2015, the eleventh highest-grossing foreign-language film of all time, and the second highest-grossing foreign-language Indian film ever (after Dhoom 3). In Hong Kong, the film grossed HK$1,364,088 (US$175,558) in 2016. After 26 days of its release in China, the film became the third Indian film (first featuring Salman Khan) to gross more than ₹500 crore from overseas markets.

==== China ====
In China, on its opening day of 2 March 2018, the film grossed US$2.29 million, debuting at number seven on the daily China box office. This is the fourth-highest opening for an Indian film in China, after Secret Superstar ($6.97 million), Hindi Medium ($3.68 million) and Dangal ($2.55 million), while Bajrangi Bhaijaan also crossed the lifetime China gross of 3 Idiots (2009). On its second day, Bajrangi Bhaijaan grossed $3.11 million, entering the top five, with a two-day gross of $5.36 million. It grossed another $3.13 million in its third day, giving it an opening weekend gross of $9 million. It is the third-highest opening weekend for an Indian film, behind only Secret Superstar and Dangal, and it has become the highest-grossing Indian film not starring Aamir Khan. The successful opening weekend of Bajrangi Bhaijaan has been attributed to strong word of mouth, generated by high audience ratings such as 8.6 on Douban and 9.7 on Maoyan.

On the 14th day of its release, the film grossed $1.13 million and became the first Indian film not featuring Aamir Khan to gross more than ₹200 crore in the Chinese market, grossing $31.12 million up until then. In 31 days, the film had a cumulative gross of $48 million(₹313 crore). The film's audiences were about 60% female and 40% male, and the majority were in the 20–34 age group. It surpassed Star Wars: The Last Jedi to become the seventh highest-grossing film in China during the first quarter of 2018, behind Secret Superstar and other American films including Black Panther and Pacific Rim: Uprising.

== Accolades ==
Award (Note: Awards, festivals and organisations are in alphabetical order.)	Date of ceremony (Note: Date is linked to the article about the awards held that year, wherever possible.)	Category	Recipient(s)	Result	Ref.
BIG Star Entertainment Awards	13 December 2015	Most Entertaining Social Film	Bajrangi Bhaijaan – Kabir Khan, Salman Khan	Nominated	
BIG Star Entertainment Awards	13 December 2015	Most Entertaining Director	Kabir Khan	Won	
BIG Star Entertainment Awards	13 December 2015	Most Entertaining Actor in a Social Role – Male	Salman Khan	Won	
BIG Star Entertainment Awards	13 December 2015	Most Entertaining Actor in a Social Role – Male	Nawazuddin Siddiqui	Nominated	
BIG Star Entertainment Awards	13 December 2015	Most Entertaining Actor Debut – Female	Harshaali Malhotra	Nominated	
BIG Star Entertainment Awards	13 December 2015	Most Entertaining Child Star	Harshaali Malhotra	Won	
Filmfare Awards	15 January 2016	Best Film	Bajrangi Bhaijaan	Nominated	
Filmfare Awards	15 January 2016	Best Director	Kabir Khan	Nominated	
Filmfare Awards	15 January 2016	Best Story	V. Vijayendra Prasad	Won	
Filmfare Awards	15 January 2016	Best Actor	Salman Khan	Nominated	
Global Indian Music Academy Awards	6 April 2016	Best Film Album	Bajrangi Bhaijaan – Pritam	Nominated	
Global Indian Music Academy Awards	6 April 2016	Best Music Director	Pritam	Nominated	
Global Indian Music Academy Awards	6 April 2016	Best Lyricist	Kausar Munir for "Tu Jo Mila"	Nominated	
Indian Television Academy Awards	6 September 2015	Popular Director	Kabir Khan	Won	
Indian Television Academy Awards	6 September 2015	Best Child Artist	Harshaali Malhotra	Won	
International Indian Film Academy Awards	26 June 2016	Best Film	Bajrangi Bhaijaan	Won	
International Indian Film Academy Awards	26 June 2016	Best Director	Kabir Khan	Nominated	
International Indian Film Academy Awards	26 June 2016	Best Story	V. Vijayendra Prasad	Nominated	
International Indian Film Academy Awards	26 June 2016	Best Screenplay	V. Vijayendra Prasad, Kabir Khan, Parveez Shaikh	Won	
International Indian Film Academy Awards	26 June 2016	Best Actor	Salman Khan	Nominated	
International Indian Film Academy Awards	26 June 2016	Best Supporting Actor	Nawazuddin Siddiqui	Nominated	
International Indian Film Academy Awards	26 June 2016	Best Performance in a Comic Role	Nawazuddin Siddiqui	Nominated	
International Indian Film Academy Awards	26 June 2016	Best Music Director	Pritam	Nominated	
Mirchi Music Awards	29 February 2016	Upcoming Male Vocalist of The Year	Jubin Nautiyal for "Zindagi Kuch Toh Bata (Reprise)"	Won	
Mirchi Music Awards	29 February 2016	Best Song Producer (Programming & Arranging)	Dhrubajyoti Phukan, Nikhil Paul George; Roop Mahanta, Sunny M.R. for "Selfie Le Le Re"	Nominated	
National Film Awards	3 May 2016	Best Popular Film Providing Wholesome Entertainment	Producer: Rockline Venkatesh & Salman Khan; Director: Kabir Khan	Won	
Producers Guild Film Awards (Note: Previously known as Apsara Film & Television Producers Guild Awards.)	22 December 2015	Best Film	Bajrangi Bhaijaan	Won	
Producers Guild Film Awards	22 December 2015	Best Director	Kabir Khan	Nominated	
Producers Guild Film Awards	22 December 2015	Best Dialogue	Kabir Khan	Nominated	
Producers Guild Film Awards	22 December 2015	Best Story	V. Vijayendra Prasad	Won	
Producers Guild Film Awards	22 December 2015	Best Screenplay	V. Vijayendra Prasad, Kabir Khan, Parveez Shaikh	Won	
Producers Guild Film Awards	22 December 2015	Best Actor in a Leading Role	Salman Khan	Nominated	
Producers Guild Film Awards	22 December 2015	Best Actor in a Supporting Role	Nawazuddin Siddiqui	Won	
Producers Guild Film Awards	22 December 2015	Best Actor in a Comic Role	Nawazuddin Siddiqui	Nominated	
Producers Guild Film Awards	22 December 2015	Best Female Debut	Harshaali Malhotra	Nominated	
Producers Guild Film Awards	22 December 2015	Best Child Actor	Harshaali Malhotra	Won	
Producers Guild Film Awards	22 December 2015	Best Music Director	Pritam	Nominated	
Screen Awards	8 January 2016	Best Film	Bajrangi Bhaijaan	Won	
Screen Awards	8 January 2016	Best Director	Kabir Khan	Won	
Screen Awards	8 January 2016	Best Story	V. Vijayendra Prasad	Won	
Screen Awards	8 January 2016	Best Child Artist	Harshaali Malhotra	Won	
Screen Awards	8 January 2016	Best Background Music	Julius Packiam	Won	
Stardust Awards	21 December 2015	Best Film of the Year	Bajrangi Bhaijaan	Won	
Stardust Awards	21 December 2015	Best Director of the Year	Kabir Khan	Won	
Stardust Awards	21 December 2015	Best Story	V. Vijayendra Prasad	Nominated	
Stardust Awards	21 December 2015	Best Screenplay	V. Vijayendra Prasad, Kabir Khan, Parveez Shaikh	Nominated	
Stardust Awards	21 December 2015	Best Actor of the Year – Male	Salman Khan	Nominated	
Stardust Awards	21 December 2015	Best Actor of the Year – Female	Kareena Kapoor Khan	Nominated	
Stardust Awards	21 December 2015	Best Supporting Actor	Nawazuddin Siddiqui	Nominated	
Stardust Awards	21 December 2015	Breakthrough Performance by a Child Artiste	Harshaali Malhotra	Won	
Stardust Awards	21 December 2015	Best Music Director	Pritam	Nominated	
Stardust Awards	21 December 2015	Best Lyricist	Kausar Munir for "Tu Jo Mila"	Nominated	
Stardust Awards	21 December 2015	Best Playback Singer (Male)	Adnan Sami for "Bhar Do Jholi Meri"	Nominated	
Stardust Awards	21 December 2015	Best Music Album	Bajrangi Bhaijaan – T-Series	Nominated	
Times of India Film Awards	18 March 2016	Best Film	Bajrangi Bhaijaan	Won	
Times of India Film Awards	18 March 2016	Best Director	Kabir Khan	Nominated	
Times of India Film Awards	18 March 2016	Best Actor	Salman Khan	Nominated	
Times of India Film Awards	18 March 2016	Best Supporting Actor	Nawazuddin Siddiqui	Nominated	
Zee Cine Awards	20 February 2016	Best Film	Bajrangi Bhaijaan	Won	
Zee Cine Awards	20 February 2016	Best Actor – Male	Salman Khan	Won	
Zee Cine Awards	20 February 2016	Best Actor in a Supporting Role – Male	Nawazuddin Siddiqui	Nominated	
Zee Cine Awards	20 February 2016	Best Actor in a Comic Role	Nawazuddin Siddiqui	Won	
Zee Cine Awards	20 February 2016	Best Female Debut	Harshaali Malhotra	Won	
Zee Cine Awards	20 February 2016	Best Cinematography	Aseem Mishra	Nominated	
Zee Cine Awards	20 February 2016	Best Track of the Year	"Selfie Le Le Re"	Nominated	

== Sequel ==
In December 2021, Khan confirmed that the sequel of the movie was in scripting stage, and V. Vijayendra Prasad is writing the script. Later that month, Khan confirmed that the movie has been titled as Pawan Putra Bhaijaan. Khan also officially announced the same on 19 December 2021, during the Hindi pre-release event of RRR.

== See also ==
- Bollywood 100 Crore Club
- List of highest-grossing Bollywood films
- List of Bollywood highest-grossing films in overseas markets
- Pakistani Bajrangi Bhaijan
