= International Hero (film) =

- Directed by: Sanjay Niranjan
- Produced by: Sanjay Niranjan
- Starring: Gurleen Chopra; Nakul Vaid; Shahbaaz Khan
- Release date: 20 March 2015
- Country: India
- Language: Hindi

International Hero is a 2015 Indian action movie, directed and produced by Sanjay Niranjan. The movie features Gurleen Chopra, Nakul Vaid and Shahbaaz Khan in the lead roles, with Puneet Issar, Kader Khan, Shashi Sharma and Shagufta Ali in supporting roles.

== Plot ==
The story is about a frustrated police cop, a victim of the circumstances and a politician who exploits the tricky situation and emotions of Hindus and Muslims to his advantage. A Khan family of the locality happens to meet a Hindu boy Anand who has come to his house to deliver an item sent by Khan's son who is in Bangalore. Anand and Shahnaz (Daughter of Kader Khan) meet each other at Khan's house, they love each other. Taking advantage of a minor incident in the locality, both communities clash. The Khan Chacha (Paternal Uncle) faces the wrath of his own community, but does not give space for riots and stands like a rock between Anand and his community. He says with pride that he is a real Muslim who believes in Secularism and not terrorism. Finally, Anand and Shahnaz get married.

== Cast ==
- Gurleen Chopra as Shahnaz
- Nakul Vaid as Anand
- Shahbaaz Khan as Dev Dixit
- Jatin Grewal as Akash
- Puneet Issar as Paras
- Shagufta Ali as Basanti
- Shashi Sharma as Radha
- Kranti Jha as Rashmi
- Kader Khan as Bashir Baig
