= Kabir Khan (director) =

Indian filmmaker (born 1968)

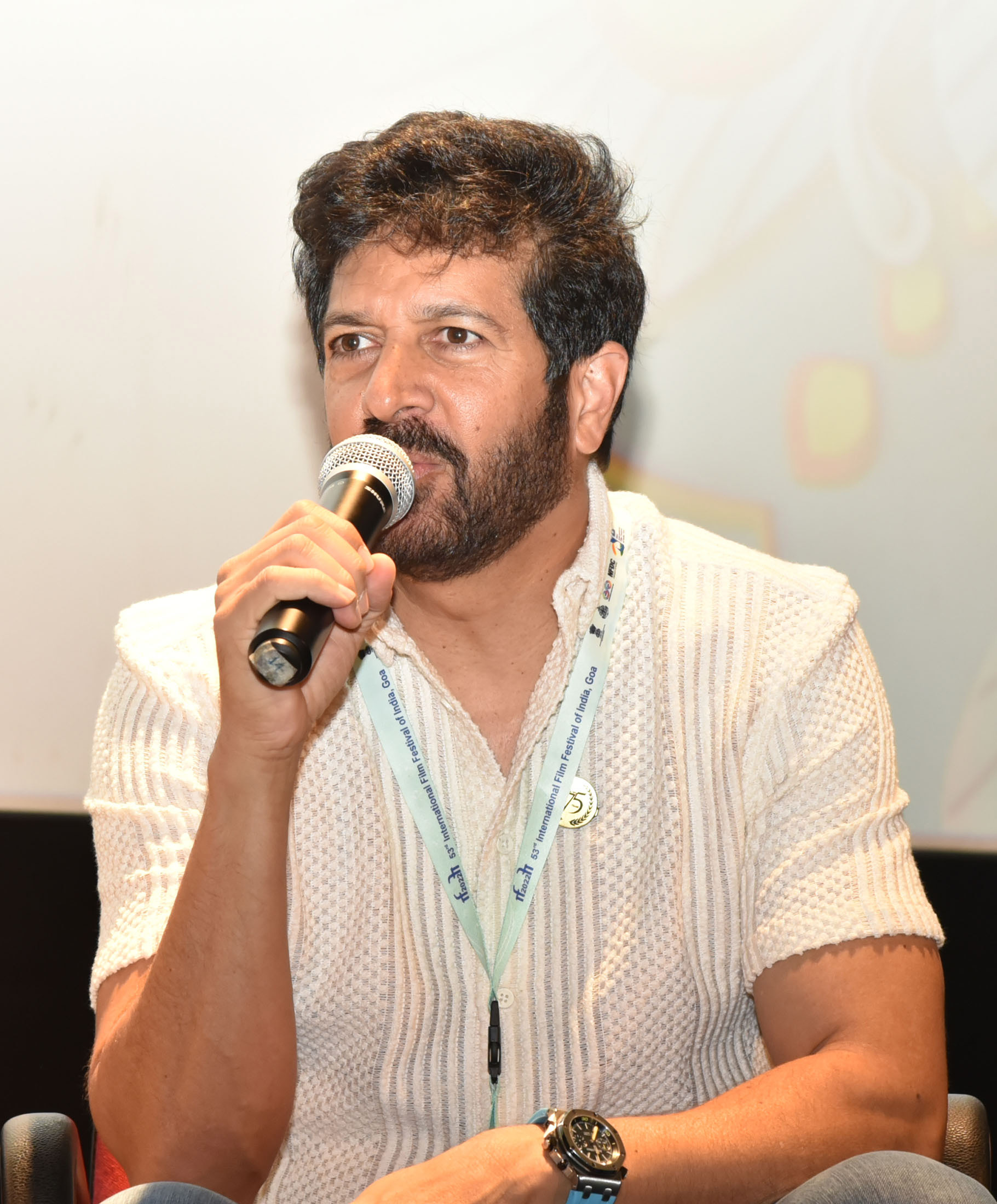
- Khan in 2022
- Born: 14 September 1971 (age 55); Hyderabad, Andhra Pradesh,(now in Telangana), India
- Education: Kirori Mal College, Delhi University; Jamia Millia Islamia
- Occupations: Film director; screenwriter; producer
- Spouse: Mini Mathur
- Children: 2
- Parent: Rasheeduddin Khan
- Relatives: Vijay Krishna Acharya (brother-in-law)

Kabir Khan is an Indian film director, screenwriter and cinematographer who works in Hindi cinema. He started his career working in documentary films, and then made his feature film directorial debut in 2006 with the thriller Kabul Express. He is best known for directing Ek Tha Tiger (2012) and Bajrangi Bhaijaan (2015)

He is the board member of Mumbai Academy of the Moving Image.

== Early life and background ==
Khan was born to political scientist Rasheeduddin Khan, a Pashtun Muslim, and Hindu Telugu-speaking mother, Leela Narayan Rao. Rasheeduddin, who was a Pathan hailing from Kaimganj in Farrukhabad district, Uttar Pradesh, was a nephew of Dr. Zakir Hussain (President of India – 1967 to 1969) and a communist politician favored by Indira Gandhi as a nominated member of the Rajya Sabha at a relatively young age, in the early 1970s. His sister, Anusheh, is married to film-maker Vijay Krishna Acharya, director of films like Tashan and Dhoom 3.

Khan studied at Kirori Mal College of Delhi University, as well as Jamia Millia Islamia in Delhi. He is married to television host & actress Mini Mathur, with whom he has 2 children, Vivaan and Sairah.

In initial days, he worked with prominent journalist Saeed Naqvi. Before becoming a full-time filmmaker he worked with Saeed Naqvi as a cameraman and director and travelled around the world covering international issues. He travelled to about 60 countries with Saeed Naqvi and shot interviews and documentaries for him. During his work as a cinematographer, he had the opportunity to meet world leaders such as Nelson Mandela and Fidel Castro.

== Film career ==
=== Initial work and directorial breakthrough (1996-2012) ===
Khan started his career at age 25 as a cinematographer for the Discovery Channel documentary film Beyond the Himalayas (1996) directed by Gautam Ghosh. He then made his own directorial debut with the documentary The Forgotten Army (1999) based on Subhas Chandra Bose's Indian National Army. He then directed two more documentaries before shifting his focus to mainstream cinema.

Khan made his mainstream directorial debut with the Yash Raj Films-backed adventure thriller Kabul Express (2006). Starring John Abraham and Arshad Warsi in lead roles, the film received mixed-to-positive reviews upon release, but emerged as a commercial failure at the box-office. It, however, earned Khan the Indira Gandhi Award for Best Debut Film of a Director. He then worked on the movie New York, which was successful.

His next directorial venture, the action thriller Ek Tha Tiger (2012), again starring Kaif alongside Salman Khan, marked the end of his 3-film deal with Yash Raj Films. The first instalment in the YRF Spy Universe, the film received positive reviews from critics upon release, and emerged as the highest-grossing Hindi film of the year.

=== Film production and screenwriting (2015-present) ===
After his 3-film deal with Yash Raj Films ended, Khan set up his own production company, and ventured into mainstream screenwriting with the adventure comedy-drama Bajrangi Bhaijaan (2015), starring Salman Khan and Kareena Kapoor in lead roles. The film received widespread critical acclaim upon release, and emerged as a major commercial success at the box-office, as well as the highest-grossing Indian film at the time, and currently ranks as the third highest-grossing Hindi film of all time and the seventh highest-grossing Indian film of all time. It also won him the National Film Award for Best Popular Film Providing Wholesome Entertainment, in addition to earning him his first nomination for the Filmfare Award for Best Director. Asked about the films use of the phrase Jai Shri Ram, he said that when he grew up, Jai Shri Ram was a benevolent expression, "rooted in our culture", but that the words have become aggressive, and that "it bothers me to see how we are becoming increasingly intolerant."

After the widespread critical and commercial success of Bajrangi Bhaijaan, he collaborated with Kaif for the third time, alongside Saif Ali Khan in the action thriller Phantom (2015). The film was based on Hussain Zaidi's book Mumbai Avengers which revolved around the aftermath of 26/11 Mumbai attacks. It received mixed reviews from critics upon release, and emerged as a below-average grosser at the box-office.

Khan again collaborated with Salman for the third time on the war drama Tubelight (2017), an official remake of the 2015 American film Little Boy, which was based in the backdrop of the 1962 Sino-Indian war and marked the Hindi film debut of Chinese actress Zhu Zhu, with a worldwide release in June 2017. The film, just like the original, met with negative reviews, but was slightly better received for its direction and Salman's performance. It also emerged as a commercial failure at the box-office.

In 2021, he directed the biographical sports drama 83, based on India's historic victory at the 1983 Cricket World Cup, with Ranveer Singh plays the role of Kapil Dev, the Captain of the Indian Cricket Team. The film received widespread critical acclaim upon release, and earned Khan his second nomination for the Filmfare Award for Best Director. Made on a budget of ₹270 crore, the film only managed a worldwide gross collection of ₹190.86 crore and was deemed a box-office bomb.

His next film was the Kartik Aaryan starrer sports biopic Chandu Champion which released on 14 June 2024. The film is based on the life and achievements of the boxer turned Paralympic gold medalist, Murlikant Petkar, including his historic triumph at the 1972 Summer Paralympics in Heidelberg, Germany. The received positive reviews and emerged as a modest success at the box office

He is also set to direct The Zookeeper, a Sino-Indian production. It is a travel-related drama film which is being shot in the Chinese city of Chengdu its the surrounding regions. The film has an estimated budget of $25 million (₹185 crore), and it will star a leading Indian actor and a leading Chinese actress.

== Filmography ==
Year	Work	Credited as			Notes	Producers
Year	Work	Director	Producer	Writer	Notes	Producers
1996	Beyond the Himalayas	No	No	No	Documentary; Cinematographer	
1999	The Forgotten Army	Yes	No	No	Documentary	
2006	Kabul Express	Yes	No	Yes	Indira Gandhi Award for Best Debut Film of a Director	Yash Raj Films
2009	New York	Yes	No	No		Yash Raj Films
2012	Ek Tha Tiger	Yes	No	Yes	First Installment in the YRF Spy Universe	Yash Raj Films
2015	Bajrangi Bhaijaan	Yes	Yes	No	National Film Award for Best Popular Film Providing Wholesome Entertainment Nominated – Filmfare Award for Best Director	Eros International; Salman Khan Films; Rockline Venkatesh; Kabir Khan
2015	Phantom	Yes	No	Yes		Sajid Nadiadwala; Siddharth Roy Kapur
2017	Tubelight	Yes	Yes	Yes		Salman Khan Films; Kabir Khan
2020	The Forgotten Army – Azaadi Ke Liye	Yes	Yes	Yes	Web Series	Amazon Studios; Kabir Khan
2021	83	Yes	Yes	Yes	Nominated – Filmfare Award for Best Director	Kabir Khan; Deepika Padukone; Vishnu Vardhan Induri; Sajid Nadiadwala; Madhu Mantena; Reliance Entertainment
2024	Chandu Champion	Yes	Yes	No		Kabir Khan; Sajid Nadiadwala
2024	My Melbourne	Yes	No	No	Anthology film "Emma" Segment	Mitu Bhowmick Lange

=== Frequent collaborations ===
Artists	Kabul Express (2006)	New York (2009)	Ek Tha Tiger (2012)	Bajrangi Bhaijaan (2015)	Phantom (2015)	Tubelight (2017)	83 (2021)	Chandu Champion (2024)
Salman Khan			Yes	Yes		Yes		
Katrina Kaif		Yes	Yes		Yes			
John Abraham	Yes	Yes						
Roshan Seth	Yes		Yes					
Nawazuddin Siddiqui		Yes		Yes				
Mohammed Zeeshan Ayyub					Yes	Yes		
Om Puri				Yes		Yes		
Pritam		Yes		Yes	Yes	Yes	Yes	Yes
Julius Packiam	Yes	Yes	Yes	Yes	Yes	Yes	Yes	Yes
KK	Yes	Yes	Yes	Yes		Yes	Yes	

== Awards and nominations ==
Film	Award	Category	Result	Ref
Kabul Express	54th National Film Awards	Best Debut Director	Won	
Kabul Express	2007 Asian First Film Festival	Swarovski Trophy for Best Director	Won	
Kabul Express	2007 Asian First Film Festival	"Purple Orchid" Award for the Best Film	Won	
New York	33rd Cairo International Film Festival	Golden Pyramid Award for Best Film	Nominated	
Ek Tha Tiger	Stardust Awards 2013	Hottest New Filmmaker	Won	
Ek Tha Tiger	3rd BIG Star Entertainment Awards	Most Entertaining Director	Nominated	
Bajrangi Bhaijaan	63rd National Film Awards	Best Popular Film with Entertainment (share with Salman Khan and Rockline Venkatesh)	Won	
Bajrangi Bhaijaan	61st Filmfare Awards	Best Director	Nominated	
Bajrangi Bhaijaan	2015 Stardust Awards	Best Film of the Year	Won	
Bajrangi Bhaijaan	2015 Stardust Awards	Best Director	Won	
Bajrangi Bhaijaan	2015 Stardust Awards	Best Screenplay (with Vijayendra Prasad)	Nominated	
Bajrangi Bhaijaan	Big Star Entertainment Awards 2015	Most Entertaining Social Film	Nominated	
Bajrangi Bhaijaan	Big Star Entertainment Awards 2015	Most Entertaining Director	Won	
Bajrangi Bhaijaan	Indian Telly Awards	Gary Binder Award for the Young Successful Director of the Year	Won	
Bajrangi Bhaijaan	Indian Television Academy Awards	Popular Director	Won	
Bajrangi Bhaijaan	17th IIFA Awards	Best Film	Won	
Bajrangi Bhaijaan	17th IIFA Awards	Best Director	Nominated	
Bajrangi Bhaijaan	17th IIFA Awards	Best Screenplay (with Parveez Shaikh)	Won	
Bajrangi Bhaijaan	11th Apsara Awards	Best Film	Won	
Bajrangi Bhaijaan	11th Apsara Awards	Best Director	Nominated	
Bajrangi Bhaijaan	11th Apsara Awards	Best Screenplay	Won	
Bajrangi Bhaijaan	22nd Screen Awards	Best Film	Won	
Bajrangi Bhaijaan	22nd Screen Awards	Best Director	Won	
83	22nd IIFA Awards	Best Film	Nominated	
83	22nd IIFA Awards	Best Director	Nominated	
83	22nd IIFA Awards	Best Story	Won	
83	67th Filmfare Awards	Best Director	Nominated	
83	67th Filmfare Awards	Best Screenplay	Nominated	
83	67th Filmfare Awards	Best Dialogue	Nominated	
—N/a	Bollywood Hungama Style Icons	Most Stylish Filmmaker	Nominated	
