= Badlapur (soundtrack) =

2015 film soundtrack album

Soundtrack album by Sachin–Jigar
- Released: 23 January 2015
- Recorded: 2014–2015
- Genre: Feature film soundtrack
- Length: 27:55
- Language: Hindi
- Label: Eros Music (Note: In 2023, the album was distributed through Sony Music India following their acquisition of soundtracks released through Eros Music.)
- Producer: Sachin–Jigar

Sachin–Jigar chronology
Ungli (2014)	Badlapur (2015)	ABCD 2 (2015)

Badlapur is the soundtrack album composed by Sachin–Jigar to the 2015 Hindi-language crime thriller film of the same name directed by Sriram Raghavan starring Varun Dhawan, Nawazuddin Siddiqui, Huma Qureshi, Radhika Apte, Yami Gautam and Divya Dutta. The soundtrack album consisted of five original songs, an alternative rock version, a remix and a mashup of all the tracks, with lyrics written by Priya Saraiya and Dinesh Vijan. The album was released through Eros Music on 23 January 2015.

== Background ==
Sachin–Jigar composed the film score and soundtrack to Badlapur. It was the first of Sriram Raghavan's films since Ek Hasina Thi (2004) where the same composer has been featured on the different aspects of music. Sachin said that when he received the script from Raghavan, they were excited as it was challenging to a "gritty", "dark" film which something that they never had done before. Jigar was initially skeptical about Sachin's decision, but eventually agreed to score the film.

The duo conceptualized around five songs and composed all the tracks, which were mostly alternative rock and melancholic numbers. They utilized live instrumentation along with drums and guitars for the songs. Jigar's wife Priya and producer Dinesh Vijan where credited for lyrics in all the tracks, and were not credited individually, as much of the songs were developed through the brainstorming sessions with both the composers, where the ideas and words were coined in the final lyrics. All of the songs were composed within 90 minutes.

The first of the songs to be recorded was "Jee Karda" which he described as an "intense number infused with metal beats". It was recorded by Divya Kumar, who performed the song from scratch which was considered to be soulful and raw. Varun admitted that "Jee Karda" captured the essence of the film. For "Jeena Jeena", they needed a voice that has "less singing and more soul" and Atif Aslam was chosen as the perfect fit for the track, Jigar said "The part of the song where he hums, it almost seems he is the guy sitting in your living room and crooning".

Arijit Singh and Rekha Bhardwaj recorded vocals for the duet "Judaai" which was their first collaboration in a duet number. Sachin recalled that they waited for six months to bring the two singers together as they felt their vocals "would make the song unforgettable". "Badla Badla" was considered to be Sachin's favorite number from the album as it shared the contrasting qualities between the vocals of Vishal Dadlani, Suraj Jagan and Jasleen Royal balancing between devilish, unpredictable and haunting.

== Release ==
The first song from the album, "Jee Karda" was released on 19 December 2014. The second song "Jeena Jeena" was released on 15 January 2015. The soundtrack was released through Eros Music on 23 January.

== Track listing ==
All lyrics are written by Priya Saraiya and Dinesh Vijan; all music is composed by Sachin–Jigar.

Track listing
No.	Title	Singer(s)	Length
1.	"Jee Karda"	Divya Kumar	4:01
2.	"Jeena Jeena"	Atif Aslam	3:49
3.	"Jee Karda" (Rock Version)	Divya Kumar	4:00
4.	"Judaai"	Rekha Bhardwaj, Arijit Singh	4:32
5.	"Jeena Jeena" (Remix)	Atif Aslam	3:39
6.	"Badla Badla"	Vishal Dadlani, Jasleen Royal, Suraj Jagan	3:13
7.	"Sone Ka Paani"	Priya Saraiya	1:52
8.	"Badlapur Mashup"	Various Artists	2:49
Total length:			27:55

== Reception ==
Suanshu Khurana of The Indian Express wrote "The album falters in terms of lyrics. However, this is Sachin-Jigar's most succinct work." Kasmin Fernandes of The Times of India rated 4.5 out of 5 and called it a "well-arranged and composed soundtrack". Joginder Tuteja of Rediff.com wrote "The music of Badlapur is a satisfying experience. Each of the three songs makes their presence felt." Rajiv Vijayakar of Bollywood Hungama wrote "Sachin-Jigar, arguably the brightest and most versatile of the new lot, prove their mettle again."

Vipin Nair of Music Aloud rated 7.5/10 saying "Sriram Raghavan's musical sensibilities continue to impress, even while changing composers every time. And Sachin Jigar start their year well." Karthik Srinivasan of Milliblog called it a "short, but riveting soundtrack from Sachin Jigar". Rucha Sharma of Daily News and Analysis described the album as "must listen" adding "'Jee Karda' is hard to miss and so is 'Judaai'".

== Accolades ==
Award	Date of ceremony (Note: Date is linked to the article about the awards held that year, wherever possible.)	Category	Recipient(s) and nominee(s)	Result	Ref.
Filmfare Awards	15 January 2016	Best Male Playback Singer	Atif Aslam (for the song "Jeena Jeena")	Nominated	
Global Indian Music Academy Awards	6 April 2016	Best Music Arranger and Programmer	Sachin–Jigar (for the song "Jee Karda")	Nominated	
Global Indian Music Academy Awards	6 April 2016	Best Engineer – Film Album	Eric Pillai	Nominated	
Global Indian Music Academy Awards	6 April 2016	Best Background Score	Sachin–Jigar	Nominated	
Mirchi Music Awards	29 February 2016	Album of The Year	Badlapur	Nominated	
Mirchi Music Awards	29 February 2016	Best Song Producer (Programming & Arranging)	Sachin–Jigar (for the song "Jee Karda")	Nominated	
