= Agent Vinod (soundtrack) =

Soundtrack album by Pritam
- Released: 17 February 2012
- Recorded: 2011–2012
- Genre: Film soundtrack
- Length: 51:24
- Language: Hindi
- Label: T-Series
- Producer: Pritam

Pritam chronology
Players (2012)	Agent Vinod (2012)	Jannat 2 (2012)

Agent Vinod is the soundtrack album to the 2012 film of the same name directed by Sriram Raghavan and starred Saif Ali Khan and Kareena Kapoor. The film's soundtrack were composed by Pritam with lyrics written by Amitabh Bhattacharya and Neelesh Misra. The album was released under the T-Series label on 17 February 2012 and received mixed reviews from critics.

== Development ==
Pritam composed the soundtrack to Agent Vinod in his first collaboration with Sriram Raghavan. The track "I'll Do the Talking Tonight" is a partial interpolation of the popular 1978 song "Rasputin", composed by the German disco group Boney M. which in turn, was an uncredited interpolation from "Kâtibim", an Ottoman folk song. Pritam acquired the rights for the song, as he had to compose a nightclub song which should have a universal appeal, and the rendition of "Rasputin" was part of the nightclub sequence. Amitabh Bhattacharya's lyrics also shared similarities to the evergreen hit "Dum Maro Dum".

The song "Raabta" had four versions. The original version is solely sung by Arijit Singh, but it was not used in the film. The "Night in a Motel" version of "Raabta" is featured in the film, sung by Singh and Aditi Singh Sharma. Two other versions—"Siyaah Raatein" and "Kehte Hain Khuda Ne"—was rendered by Shreya Ghoshal, Hamsika Iyer and Joi Barua with Singh. Each version of the track varies in duration, lyrics and musical arrangements. The "Night in a Motel" version was incorrectly credited to Hamsika Iyer in the CD liner notes, while Aditi's name was used in the credits for the digital album. The song "Pyaar ki Pungi" was described as a cheeky and fun number, with lyrics that referenced of the story of Laila and Majnu. Upon release, the song was topping the music charts according to The Wall Street Journal, while Hindustan Times and India Today considered it to be a chartbuster.

The film version of "Dil Mera Muft Ka" was not included in the soundtrack. Similarly, the song "Govind Bolo Gopal Bolo" was not included in the soundtrack as well. However, it was released separately on 29 March 2012 on the T-Series YouTube channel owing to popular demand.

== Reception ==
Joginder Tuteja of Bollywood Hungama gave three stars to the album and stated "despite not really the kind of soundtrack that one would remember six months down the line, it is still good enough to ensure that it helps the film's narrative. Songs like 'I'll Do The Talking Tonight', 'Dil Mera Muft Ka' and 'Pungi', though not extraordinary, keep up the pace while the theme track is an absolute killer. As for the one that may stay on long, there is 'Raabta' that one can play on a repeat mode and feel content." Karthik Srinivasan of Milliblog stated "Pritam lets his wildly enjoyable music do the talking in Agent Vinod".

In a mixed review, Jaspreet Pandohar of BBC stated "this is a loud, brazen bevy of songs that will attract some and repel others." Rachit Gupta of Filmfare called it as "a stilted, one and a half horse album wasn’t what we expected" and rated two out of five stars. Mumbai Mirror based critic rated one-and-a-half out of five, stating "What ails Pritam’s latest fare is that it sounds just as dated as the film looks. It lacks the verve and chirpiness that he often captures. Not only is there a strange stuck-in-time air around this soundtrack, it also sounds more synthetic than organic, smug in its space. With such an unremarkable, downer of a soundtrack, Agent Vinod may as well press Self-Destruct on this one."

== Track listing ==
No.	Title	Writer(s)	Artist(s)	Length
1.	"I'll Do The Talking Tonight"	Amitabh Bhattacharya	Neeraj Shridhar, Shefali Alvares, Aditi Singh Sharma, Barbie Amod	4:16
2.	"Dil Mera Muft Ka"	Neelesh Misra	Nandini Srikar, Malini Awasthi, Muazzam, Rizwan, Shadaab Faridi, Altamash Faridi, Shabab Sabri	4:26
3.	"Raabta" (Siyaah Raatein)	Amitabh Bhattacharya	Hamsika Iyer, Arijit Singh, Joi Barua	4:50
4.	"Pyaar ki Pungi"	Amitabh Bhattacharya	Mika Singh, Nakash Aziz, Amitabh Bhattacharya, Pritam, Javed Jaffrey	4:10
5.	"Agent Vinod" (Theme)	—	Instrumental	4:37
6.	"I'll Do The Talking Tonight" (Remix)	Amitabh Bhattacharya	Neeraj Shridhar, Aditi Singh Sharma, Barbie Amod	4:32
7.	"Raabta" (Night in a Motel)	Amitabh Bhattacharya	Aditi Singh Sharma, Arijit Singh	3:32
8.	"Pungi" (Remix)	Amitabh Bhattacharya	Mika Singh, Amitabh Bhattacharya, Nakash Aziz, Pritam, Javed Jaffrey	4:09
9.	"Raabta"	Amitabh Bhattacharya	Arijit Singh	4:04
10.	"Dil Mera Muft Ka" (Remix)	Neelesh Misra	Malini Awasthi	3:48
11.	"Raabta" (Kehte Hain Khuda Ne)	Amitabh Bhattacharya	Shreya Ghoshal, Arijit Singh, Joi Barua	4:50
12.	"Habibi Ya Nour El Ain"	Traditional	Alabina, Ishtar	4:10
Total length:				51:24

== Awards and nominations ==
Award	Category	Recipients	Result	Ref
Apsara Film & Television Producers Guild Award	Best Female Playback Singer	Hamsika Iyer for "Raabta"	Nominated	
International Indian Film Academy Awards	Best Male Playback Singer	Mika Singh for "Pyaar ki Pungi"	Nominated	
Mirchi Music Awards	Programmer & Arranger of the Year	DJ Phukan & Hyacinth Dsouza – "Dil Mera Muft Ka"	Won	
Mirchi Music Awards	Song representing Sufi tradition	"Raabta"	Nominated	
Screen Awards	Best Male Playback Singer	Mika Singh for "Dil Mera Muft Ka"	Nominated	
Screen Awards	Best Female Playback Singer	Nandini Srikar for "Dil Mera Muft Ka"	Nominated	
Zee Cine Awards	Best Track of the Year	"Pyaar ki Pungi"	Nominated	

== Controversies ==
The Iranian pop band Barobax filed a copyright case against Pritam as the song "Pyaar ki Pungi" was plagiarized from the band's "Soosan Khanoom". However, two weeks after the film's release, the band publicly apologised to Pritam saying both songs were different, claiming that the only similarity was the Iranian beat used in the song, and withdrew the case. The use of old songs in the film—"Aasmaan Pe Hai Khuda" from Phir Subah Hogi (1958), "Meri Jaan Maine Kaha" from The Train (1970) and "Rakkamma Kaiya Thattu" from Thalapathi (1991)—without obtaining prior permission from the producers and its respective audio labels, resulted in another controversy, and Saif paid the rights to the producers and explained this to be a last minute co-ordination problem.

== Other versions ==
The song "Raabta (Kehte Hain Khuda Ne)" was remixed for the 2017 film titled after the song featuring Deepika Padukone in a cameo alongside the lead actors Sushant Singh Rajput, Kriti Sanon and Jim Sarbh. This version was sung by Nikhita Gandhi and Arijit Singh.
