= List of accolades received by Dil Dhadakne Do =

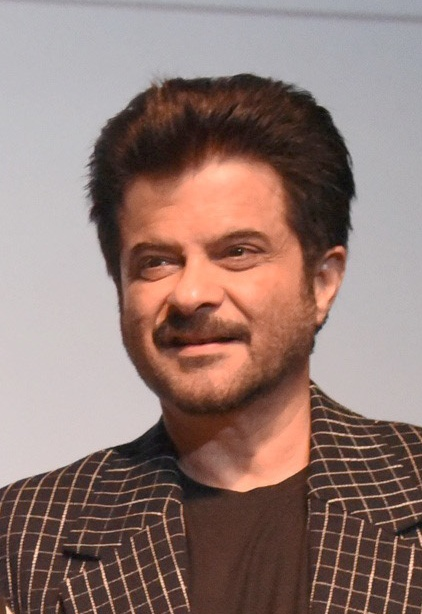
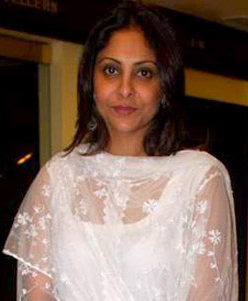
The performances of Anil Kapoor and Shefali Shah garnered critical acclaim and they both received Filmfare Award nominations: for Best Supporting Actor and Best Supporting Actress respectively, with Kapoor winning.

Dil Dhadakne Do (transl. Let the Heart Beat) is a 2015 Indian comedy-drama film directed by Zoya Akhtar. Produced by Ritesh Sidhwani and Farhan Akhtar, the film features an ensemble cast consisting of Anil Kapoor, Shefali Shah, Priyanka Chopra, Ranveer Singh, Anushka Sharma and Farhan Akhtar. The supporting cast also includes Rahul Bose, Zarina Wahab, Vikrant Massey, Ridhima Sud, Pawan Chopra, Parmeet Sethi, Dolly Mattdo and Manoj Pahwa. Akhtar co-wrote the screenplay with her friend and longtime collaborator Reema Kagti. The soundtrack was composed by the trio Shankar–Ehsaan–Loy while the cinematography was provided by Carlos Catalan. Anand Subaya and Manan Mehta edited the film.

The film tells the story of the Mehras, a dysfunctional Punjabi family who invite their family and friends along on a cruise trip to celebrate the parents' 30th wedding anniversary. Dil Dhadakne Do was released worldwide on 5 June 2015 to positive reviews from critics. The film grossed ₹1.45 billion at global box office on a budget of ₹580 million. The film garnered awards and nominations in a variety of categories with particular praise for Akhtar's direction, the performances, the music and costume design.

Dil Dhadakne Do received five Filmfare nominations, winning Best Supporting Actor for Kapoor. It received nine nominations at the 2016 Screen Awards including Best Film, Best Director for Akhtar and Best Actress for Chopra. It went on to win two: Best Supporting Actor for Kapoor and the Best Ensemble Cast. At the 2015 Stardust Awards, the film received five nominations, including Actor of the Year – Female for Chopra and Actor of the Year – Male for Singh, winning three awards: Best Supporting Actor for Kapoor, Best Supporting Actress for Shah and Best Costume Design.

== Accolades ==
Award	Date of Ceremony (Note: Date is linked to the article about the awards held that year, wherever possible.)	Category	Recipients	Result	Ref.
BIG Star Entertainment Awards	16 January 2016	Most Entertaining Drama Film	Dil Dhadakne Do	Nominated	
BIG Star Entertainment Awards	16 January 2016	Most Entertaining Actor in Drama Role – Male	Anil Kapoor	Nominated	
BIG Star Entertainment Awards	16 January 2016	Most Entertaining Actor in a Drama Film – Female	Priyanka Chopra	Nominated	
BIG Star Entertainment Awards	16 January 2016	Most Entertaining Actor in a Romantic Role – Male	Ranveer Singh	Won	
BIG Star Entertainment Awards	16 January 2016	Most Entertaining Actor in a Romantic Role – Female	Anushka Sharma	Nominated	
BIG Star Entertainment Awards	16 January 2016	Most Entertaining Singer – Female	Priyanka Chopra (for the song "Dil Dhadakne Do")	Nominated	
Filmfare Awards	16 January 2016	Best Supporting Actor	Anil Kapoor	Won	
Filmfare Awards	16 January 2016	Best Supporting Actress	Anushka Sharma	Nominated	
Filmfare Awards	16 January 2016	Best Supporting Actress	Shefali Shah	Nominated	
Filmfare Awards	16 January 2016	Best Music Director	Shankar–Ehsaan–Loy	Nominated	
Filmfare Awards	16 January 2016	Best Choreography	Bosco–Caesar (for the song "Gallan Goodiyaan")	Nominated	
Global Indian Music Academy Awards	6 April 2016	Best Music Director	Shankar–Ehsaan–Loy	Nominated	
Global Indian Music Academy Awards	6 April 2016	Best Background Score	Shankar–Ehsaan–Loy	Nominated	
Global Indian Music Academy Awards	6 April 2016	Best Engineer – Film Album	Tanay Gajjar	Nominated	
Global Indian Music Academy Awards	6 April 2016	Best Music Arranger and Programmer	Shankar–Ehsaan–Loy	Nominated	
IIFA Awards	26 June 2016	Best Actress	Priyanka Chopra	Nominated	
IIFA Awards	26 June 2016	Best Supporting Actor	Anil Kapoor	Won	
IIFA Awards	26 June 2016	Best Supporting Actor	Farhan Akhtar	Nominated	
IIFA Awards	26 June 2016	Best Supporting Actress	Anushka Sharma	Nominated	
IIFA Awards	26 June 2016	Best Female Playback Singer	Sunidhi Chauhan (for the song "Girls Like to Swing")	Nominated	
Mirchi Music Awards	29 February 2016	Album of the Year	Dil Dhadakne Do	Nominated	
Mirchi Music Awards	29 February 2016	Lyricist of the Year	Javed Akhtar (for the song "Phir Bhi Yeh Zindagi")	Nominated	
Mirchi Music Awards	29 February 2016	Best Background Score	Shankar–Ehsaan–Loy, Jim Satya	Nominated	
Mirchi Music Awards	29 February 2016	Upcoming Female Vocalist of the Year	Sukriti Kakar (for the song "Pehli Baar")	Nominated	
Producers Guild Film Awards	22 December 2015	Best Actress in a Leading Role	Priyanka Chopra	Nominated	
Producers Guild Film Awards	22 December 2015	Best Actor in a Supporting Role	Farhan Akhtar	Nominated	
Producers Guild Film Awards	22 December 2015	Best Actress in a Supporting Role	Anushka Sharma	Nominated	
Producers Guild Film Awards	22 December 2015	Best Female Playback Singer	Sunidhi Chauhan (for the song "Girls Like to Swing")	Nominated	
Producers Guild Film Awards	22 December 2015	Best Lyricist	Javed Akhtar (for the song "Gallan Goodiyaan")	Nominated	
Producers Guild Film Awards	22 December 2015	Best Choreography	Bosco–Caesar (for the song "Gallan Goodiyaan")	Nominated	
Screen Awards	8 January 2016	Best Film	Dil Dhadakne Do	Nominated	
Screen Awards	8 January 2016	Best Director	Zoya Akhtar	Nominated	
Screen Awards	8 January 2016	Best Actress	Priyanka Chopra	Nominated	
Screen Awards	8 January 2016	Best Ensemble Cast	Anil Kapoor, Shefali Shah, Priyanka Chopra, Ranveer Singh, Anushka Sharma, Farhan Akhtar	Won	
Screen Awards	8 January 2016	Best Actor (Popular Choice) (Note: Also for Bajirao Mastani)	Ranveer Singh	Nominated	
Screen Awards	8 January 2016	Best Actress (Popular Choice)	Priyanka Chopra	Nominated	
Screen Awards	8 January 2016	Best Actress (Popular Choice)	Anushka Sharma	Nominated	
Screen Awards	8 January 2016	Best Supporting Actor	Anil Kapoor	Won	
Screen Awards	8 January 2016	Best Music Director	Shankar–Ehsaan–Loy	Nominated	
Stardust Awards	22 December 2015	Actor of the Year – Female	Priyanka Chopra	Nominated	
Stardust Awards	22 December 2015	Actor of the Year – Male	Ranveer Singh	Nominated	
Stardust Awards	22 December 2015	Best Supporting Actor	Anil Kapoor	Won	
Stardust Awards	22 December 2015	Best Supporting Actress	Shefali Shah	Won	
Stardust Awards	22 December 2015	Best Costume Design	Arjun Bhasin	Won	
Times of India Film Awards	18 March 2016	Best Film	Dil Dhadakne Do	Nominated	
Times of India Film Awards	18 March 2016	Best Director	Zoya Akhtar	Nominated	
Times of India Film Awards	18 March 2016	Best Supporting Actor – Male	Anil Kapoor	Won	
Times of India Film Awards	18 March 2016	Best Supporting Actor – Female	Shefali Shah	Nominated	
Zee Cine Awards	21 February 2016	Best Actor – Female	Priyanka Chopra	Nominated	
Zee Cine Awards	21 February 2016	Best Actor in a Supporting Role – Male	Anil Kapoor	Nominated	
Zee Cine Awards	21 February 2016	Best Female Debut	Ridhima Sud	Nominated	
Zee Cine Awards	21 February 2016	Best Music Director	Shankar–Ehsaan–Loy	Nominated	
