= Dil Dhadakne Do (soundtrack) =

Dil Dhadakne Do (Original Motion Picture Soundtrack)

Soundtrack album by Shankar–Ehsaan–Loy
- Released: 2 May 2015
- Genre: Feature film soundtrack
- Length: 21:37
- Language: Hindi
- Label: T-Series
- Producer: Shankar–Ehsaan–Loy

Shankar–Ehsaan–Loy chronology
Kill Dil (2014)	Dil Dhadakne Do (Original Motion Picture Soundtrack) (2015)	Katti Batti (2015)

Dil Dhadakne Do (Original Motion Picture Soundtrack) is the soundtrack album to the 2015 film of the same name directed by Zoya Akhtar. The five-song soundtrack was composed by the trio Shankar–Ehsaan–Loy with lyrics written by Javed Akhtar and performed by Priyanka Chopra, Farhan Akhtar, Sukriti Kakar, Siddharth Mahadevan, Shankar Mahadevan, Yashita Sharma, Manish Kumar Tipu, Sukhwinder Singh, Sunidhi Chauhan, Vishal Dadlani, Divya Kumar and Alyssa Mendonsa. It was released on 2 May 2015 by T-Series.

== Background ==
Dil Dhadakne Do is the third collaboration between Shankar–Ehsaan–Loy and Zoya, who curated a retro, melodic sound unlike a pop-rock genre for the previous films. Zoya briefed about the songs in 2014, discussing the situation and placement, where she wanted a Punjabi song for the first time. Although they composed all the songs which they saved it for the last, Ehsaan Noorani got the idea which he recorded on his phone and discussed it to Loy Mendonsa in the studio. He composed a nursery rhyme-like tune, which resulted in the song "Gallan Goodiyaan"; Noorani added "I felt there's something about this 'hello hello' that'll get to people. And sure enough it caught on. You'll see each character's personality come out in the song."

The romantic number "Pehil Baar" picturised on Ranveer and Anushka is a retro rock tune, adding that it had a certain 1980s vibe to it, being reminiscent of Michael Jackson's "Billie Jean" (1983) and other artists such as Huey Lewis and the News, Prince, Tears for Fears, Whitesnake; Zoya gave the brief of two people dancing to a song, where Noorani played a riff and Mendonsa arranged the instruments. The song was performed by Shankar Mahadevan and Sukriti Kakar. Zoya then came up with the idea of using swing jazz in the song "Girls Like To Swing", being the first song they composed for the film. He refrained from using electro music but kept it acoustic with a lot of groove. The trio then wrote the brass sections which he sent abroad for Chicago to be played by a 12-piece brass band to record the brass and horn section for the title track. Those sections were recorded in Chicago which was then sampled and mastered by the trio in Mumbai.

The title track featured a chorus performed in a simplistic manner which combines gospel and rhythm and blues worked well. The tracks were performed by Farhan and Chopra, where the former's vocals "lends a certain authenticity to the film, like in Hollywood where the tradition is that actors sing themselves."

== Release ==
The album was preceded with the first song: the title track sung by Chopra and Akhtar was released on 23 April 2015. Writing for The Indian Express, Sonal Gera was critical of the visuals but found the vocals bearable. The music video for the song "Gallan Goodiyaan" was released the following week. The song was filmed at a single take in five minutes. The album was released on 2 May 2015 under the T-Series label.

== Critical reception ==
The soundtrack received positive reviews from critics, who labelled it more narrative-based than a chartbuster. Chopra's singing on the first fully-Hindi song she had recorded was also lauded by critics. Joginder Tuteja of Bollywood Hungama gave a rating of 3.5 out of 5, describing it as "a classy soundtrack [that] is unadulterated when it comes to quintessential Bollywood scheme of things". Kasmin Fernandes of The Times of India also gave it a rating of 3.5 out of 5, calling the compositions "foot-tapping and swingy". In another positive review, Devesh Sharma of Filmfare said the composers had "done a good job despite the hurdles", noting the limiting setting of the film. Karthik Srinivasan of Milliblog wrote: "mature, classy soundtrack from the dependable trio."

Aelina Kapoor of Rediff.com gave a rating 2.5 out of 5, summarizing "the music of Dil Dhadakne Do doesn't come close to that of Zindagi Na Milegi Dobara," which, however, "wasn't immediately popular. So, we should give this Shankar-Ehsaan-Loy score the benefit of the doubt and see whether it does better once the film hits the screens." A reviewer from The Indian Express was critical of the film's music, saying "lost its sheen is the melody, which, barring a couple of compositions, is either stale or not good enough to stay [...] the album fails to give us enough melody for the stories to take flight." Ananya Bhattacharya of India Today wrote "Shankar-Ehsaan-Loy's music is barely passable, and slows the film down even more. Gallan Goodiyaan is the catchiest of the soundtrack." Nandini Ramnath of Scroll.in wrote "the songs by composers Shankar-Ehsan Loy are shoehorned into the narrative rather than fitting in easily."

== Track listing ==
Dil Dhadakne Do (Original Motion Picture Soundtrack) track listing
No.	Title	Artist(s)	Length
1.	"Dil Dhadakne Do"	Priyanka Chopra, Farhan Akhtar	3:48
2.	"Pehli Baar"	Sukriti Kakar, Siddharth Mahadevan	4:23
3.	"Gallan Goodiyaan"	Shankar Mahadevan, Yashita Sharma, Manish Kumar Tipu, Farhan Akhtar, Sukhwinder Singh	4:56
4.	"Girls Like to Swing"	Sunidhi Chauhan	4:03
5.	"Phir Bhi Yeh Zindagi"	Farhan Akhtar, Vishal Dadlani, Divya Kumar, Alyssa Mendonsa	4:27
Total length:			21:37

== Accolades ==
Accolades for Dil Dhadakne Do (Original Motion Picture Soundtrack)
Award	Date of Ceremony (Note: Date is linked to the article about the awards held that year, wherever possible.)	Category	Recipients	Result	Ref.
BIG Star Entertainment Awards	16 January 2016	Most Entertaining Singer – Female	Priyanka Chopra (for the song "Dil Dhadakne Do")	Nominated	
Filmfare Awards	16 January 2016	Best Music Director	Shankar–Ehsaan–Loy	Nominated	
Global Indian Music Academy Awards	6 April 2016	Best Music Director	Shankar–Ehsaan–Loy	Nominated	
Global Indian Music Academy Awards	6 April 2016	Best Background Score	Shankar–Ehsaan–Loy	Nominated	
Global Indian Music Academy Awards	6 April 2016	Best Engineer – Film Album	Tanay Gajjar	Nominated	
Global Indian Music Academy Awards	6 April 2016	Best Music Arranger and Programmer	Shankar–Ehsaan–Loy	Nominated	
International Indian Film Academy Awards	26 June 2016	Best Female Playback Singer	Sunidhi Chauhan (for the song "Girls Like to Swing")	Nominated	
Mirchi Music Awards	29 February 2016	Album of the Year	Dil Dhadakne Do	Nominated	
Mirchi Music Awards	29 February 2016	Lyricist of the Year	Javed Akhtar (for the song "Phir Bhi Yeh Zindagi")	Nominated	
Mirchi Music Awards	29 February 2016	Best Background Score	Shankar–Ehsaan–Loy, Jim Satya	Nominated	
Mirchi Music Awards	29 February 2016	Upcoming Female Vocalist of the Year	Sukriti Kakar (for the song "Pehli Baar")	Nominated	
Producers Guild Film Awards	22 December 2015	Best Female Playback Singer	Sunidhi Chauhan (for the song "Girls Like to Swing")	Nominated	
Producers Guild Film Awards	22 December 2015	Best Lyricist	Javed Akhtar (for the song "Gallan Goodiyaan")	Nominated	
Screen Awards	8 January 2016	Best Music Director	Shankar–Ehsaan–Loy	Nominated	
Zee Cine Awards	21 February 2016	Best Music Director	Shankar–Ehsaan–Loy	Nominated	
