= Raajneeti (soundtrack) =

Soundtrack album by Pritam, Aadesh Shrivastava, Shantanu Moitra and Wayne Sharpe
- Released: 12 May 2010
- Genre: Feature film soundtrack
- Length: 41:12
- Language: Hindi
- Labels: Sony Music India; UTV Music
- Producer: Prakash Jha

Raajneeti is the soundtrack album to the 2010 film of the same name directed by Prakash Jha, starring an ensemble cast of Ajay Devgn, Nana Patekar, Ranbir Kapoor, Katrina Kaif, Arjun Rampal, Manoj Bajpayee, Sarah Thompson and Naseeruddin Shah. The film's soundtrack consisted of nine songs composed by Pritam, Aadesh Shrivastava, Shantanu Moitra and Wayne Sharpe, with lyrics written by Irshad Kamil, Sameer, Swanand Kirkire and Gulzar. The soundtrack was released under the Sony Music India label on 12 May 2010 to positive reviews from critics.

== Development ==
The soundtrack to Raajneeti featured four original songs composed by four different musicians. Pritam composed the song "Bheegi Si Bhaagi Si" sung by Mohit Chauhan and Antara Mitra, the contestant of the second season of Indian Idol. Aadesh Shrivastava composed and recorded the song "More Piya" with Shashi Suman; the song further included a female version performed by Kavita Seth. Shantanu Moitra's composition "Ishq Barse" featured vocals by Swanand Kirkire (who is also the lyricist), Pronob Biswas and Hamsika Iyer and produced by Sandeep Shirodkar. "Dhan Dhan Dharti" is composed by Wayne Sharpe, who composed the film's background score, and featured vocals by Shankar Mahadevan. Sharpe further composed "Vande Mataram" as a part of the background score.

== Release ==
The soundtrack was distributed by UTV Music with Sony Music India as the digital partner. The album was released on 23 April 2010 at the Radio Mirchi breakfast show hosted by RJ Jeeturaaj. Ranbir and Katrina attended the radio station for the music launch.

== Track listing ==
No.	Title	Lyrics	Music	Singer(s)	Length
1.	"Bheegi Si Bhaagi Si"	Irshad Kamil	Pritam	Mohit Chauhan, Antara Mitra	04:37
2.	"Mora Piya" (Male)	Sameer	Aadesh Shrivastava	Aadesh Shrivastava, Shashi Suman	05:44
3.	"Mora Piya" (Female)	Sameer	Aadesh Shrivastava	Kavita Seth	04:17
4.	"Ishq Barse"	Swanand Kirkire	Shantanu Moitra	Pranab Biswas, Hamsika Iyer, Swanand Kirkire	04:36
5.	"Dhan Dhan Dharti"	Gulzar	Wayne Sharpe	Shankar Mahadevan	04:41
6.	"Ishq Barse Club Mix" (The Bombay Bounce Club Mix by DJ Lloyd)	Swanand Kirkire	Shantanu Moitra	Pranab Biswas, Hamsika Iyer, Swanand Kirkire	03:53
7.	"Dhan Dhan Dharti" (Reprise) (Call of the Soil)	Gulzar	Wayne Sharpe	Sonu Nigam	04:35
8.	"Mora Piya Remix" (Male) (Twilight Mix by Deep & DJ Chantz)	Sameer	Aadesh Shrivastava	Aadesh Shrivastava, Shashi	04:32
9.	"Mora Piya Remix" (Female) (Trance Mix by Deep & DJ Chantz)	Sameer	Aadesh Shrivastava	Kavita Seth	04:17
Total length:					41:12

== Reception ==
Joginder Tuteja of Bollywood Hungama wrote "Music of Raajneeti delivers more than what one would have expected. Since the film is not a romantic musical, there would be quite some effort required by the makers to help the music reach out to masses. Also, around the release of the film, the focus is bound to shift towards the political drama that would mean that music may take a backseat. However, those who would catch the music would certainly not be disappointed." A reviewer from Hindustan Times wrote "the soundtrack of Raajneeti is a mixed bag with some brilliant compositions and some average numbers."

== Awards and nominations ==
Award	Date of ceremony (Note: Date is linked to the article about the awards held that year, wherever possible.)	Category	Recipients	Result	Ref.
Screen Awards	6 January 2011	Best Background Music	Wayne Sharpe	Won	
Apsara Film & Television Producers Guild Awards	12 January 2011	Best Lyricist	Sameer (for "Mora Piya")	Nominated	
Apsara Film & Television Producers Guild Awards	12 January 2011	Best Male Playback Singer	Aadesh Shrivastava (for "Mora Piya")	Nominated	
Mirchi Music Awards	27 January 2011	Male Vocalist of The Year	Aadesh Shrivastava (for "Mora Piya")	Nominated	
Mirchi Music Awards	27 January 2011	Upcoming Female Vocalist of The Year	Antara Mitra (for "Bheegi Si Bhaagi Si")	Nominated	
Mirchi Music Awards	27 January 2011	Song representing Sufi tradition	"Mora Piya"	Nominated	
Mirchi Music Awards	27 January 2011	Best Programmer & Arranger of the Year	Amar Makwana, Mani Iyer and Sandeep Chatterjie (for "Mora Piya")	Nominated	
Mirchi Music Awards	27 January 2011	Best Background Score of the Year	Wayne Sharpe	Nominated	
Global Indian Music Academy Awards	30 October 2011	Best Film Album	Raajneeti	Nominated	
Global Indian Music Academy Awards	30 October 2011	Best Music Director	Pritam, Aadesh Shrivastava, Shantanu Moitra and Wayne Sharpe	Nominated	
Global Indian Music Academy Awards	30 October 2011	Best Background Score	Wayne Sharpe	Nominated	
Global Indian Music Academy Awards	30 October 2011	Best Engineer – Film Album	Eric Pillai, Pramod Chandorkar, Shaitus Joseph	Nominated	
