= Agent Vinod =

Agent Vinod may refer to:

- Agent Vinod (1977 film), a 1977 Indian Hindi-language spy action film by Deepak Bahry, starring Mahendra Sandhu
- Agent Vinod (2012 film), a remake of the above by Sriram Raghavan, starring Saif Ali Khan
  - Agent Vinod (soundtrack), its soundtrack by Pritam

== See also ==
- Agent (disambiguation)
- Vinod, an Indian male given name
