= Judaai =

Judaai, jodayi, or jodai—meaning "separation" in Persian, Hindi, and Urdu—may refer to:

- Judaai (1980 film), an Indian Hindi-language drama film
- Judaai (1997 film), an Indian Hindi-language romantic comedy drama film
- "Judaai" (song), from the 2015 Bollywood film Badlapur
- "Judaai", a song by Pritam and Kamran Ahmed from the 2012 Indian film Jannat 2
- A Separation, a 2011 Iranian film

== See also ==
- Tano Jōdai (1886–1982), Japanese academic and peace activist
