= Massu Engira Masilamani (soundtrack) =

Masss

Soundtrack album by Yuvan Shankar Raja
- Released: 8 May 2015
- Recorded: 2015
- Genre: Feature film soundtrack
- Length: 32:10
- Language: Tamil
- Labels: Eros Music; Sony Music South
- Producer: Yuvan Shankar Raja

Yuvan Shankar Raja chronology
Idam Porul Yaeval (2014)	Masss (2015)	Yatchan (2015)
External audio
- Official Audio Jukebox on YouTube

Masss is the soundtrack album to the 2015 film Massu Engira Masilamani directed by Venkat Prabhu and produced by Studio Green, starring Suriya, Nayanthara, Pranitha Subhash, Premgi Amaren, Parthiban and Samuthirakani. Prabhu's norm collaborator Yuvan Shankar Raja composed the film's soundtrack and score while Gangai Amaran, Madhan Karky and Viveka wrote the lyrics.

The soundtrack was released under the Eros Music label on 8 May 2015 to positive reviews from critics. One song "Sema Masss" was tuned by S. Thaman as the guest composer, which was not included in the film. Despite the film's title change, the album was released under the same name as the film's previous title.

== Development ==
Prabhu's norm collaborator and cousin Yuvan Shankar Raja involved in the film's technical crew during the film's announcement in mid-2014. Shortly thereafter, Yuvan started working on the film's music the following month. He stated in an interview, that "I know the title will mislead a lot of people into thinking the songs will be commercial, but the sounds that I've played with for this film will take the audience by surprise" describing the music to be "completely wacky". In November 2014, Tanvi Shah had recorded a song for the film but was not included. At an award function later that month, Yuvan told that he was working on a special track based on the lines of "Thriller" by Michael Jackson as a tribute to the pop star. The song was later revealed to be "Poochandi" with lyrics by Gangai Amaran.

In March 2015, an article from Sify reported that Yuvan was no longer part of the project and S. Thaman would compose the remaining songs and the background score. Venkat Prabhu, however, denied the news. Speaking to Janani Karthik of The Times of India, Yuvan later admitted that Prabhu needed a kuthu dance number with Suriya and Nayanthara, but he could not work on the song as he was re-recording the film score for Idam Porul Yaeval. Since he had to shoot the song quickly because of the availability of the actors' dates, he composed a tune and contacted Thaman to orchestrate it. He further added "We are good friends and Thaman always used to tell me we should work together. That's how he got into that particular song." That song was deciphered as "Sema Masss"—a remix of the tune from the Hindi song "Gandi Baat" from R... Rajkumar (2013)—with Thaman being credited as the composer. Yuvan started working on the film's background score during late-April 2015.

== Release ==
The film's music rights were acquired by Eros Music. Yuvan submitted the master copy of the audio to the executives of Eros Music on 24 April 2015, which announced the film's music launch to be held by early May 2015. The film's track list was released on 7 May 2015, and the audio was released directly through music streaming platforms, the following day, without a promotional audio launch event. The songs were aired live through FM stations, on the day of the launch. A promotional event to release the music for the film's Telugu version Rakshasudu, was however held on 14 May 2015 at a grand event held at Hyderabad, with Nagarjuna, S. S. Rajamouli and Prabhas attending the event as chief guests.

The song "Sema Masss" was neither included in the film nor in the soundtrack album. However, the Telugu version of the song "Super Masss" was included in that album. "Sema Masss" was separately and officially uploaded in YouTube, and also as a bonus track, after the film's release. the digital rights for streaming and online distribution (including official YouTube uploads) were later released by Sony Music South.

== Track listing ==
=== Tamil ===
Masss (Original Motion Picture Soundtrack)
No.	Title	Lyrics	Music	Singer(s)	Length
1.	"Therikkudhu Masss"	Madhan Karky	Yuvan Shankar Raja	Shankar Mahadevan, Ranjith, Yuvan Shankar Raja	04:43
2.	"Naan Aval Illai"	Madhan Karky	Yuvan Shankar Raja	Chinmayi, Karthik	04:36
3.	"Poochandi"	Gangai Amaran	Yuvan Shankar Raja	Yuvan Shankar Raja, Pooja Vaidyanath	04:55
4.	"Con Man Theme"	—	Yuvan Shankar Raja	Instrumental	02:23
5.	"Piravi"	Madhan Karky	Yuvan Shankar Raja	Vaikom Vijayalakshmi	04:37
6.	"Masss Theme"	—	Yuvan Shankar Raja	Instrumental	02:02
7.	"Sema Masss" (Additional Track)	Viveka	S. Thaman	M. M. Manasi, Nivas	03:28
8.	"Therikkudhu Masss" (Gasa Gasa Mix)	Madhan Karky	Yuvan Shankar Raja, Premgi Amaren (remix)	Shankar Mahadevan, Ranjith, Yuvan Shankar Raja, Premgi Amaren	05:51

=== Telugu ===
Rakshasudu (Original Motion Picture Soundtrack)
No.	Title	Lyrics	Music	Singer(s)	Length
1.	"Masss"	Ramajogayya Sastry	Yuvan Shankar Raja	Karthik, Sooraj Santosh	04:43
2.	"Nee Needavutha"	Vennelakanti	Yuvan Shankar Raja	Karthik, Chinmayi	04:36
3.	"Boochi Boochai"	Rakendu Mouli	Yuvan Shankar Raja	Rakendu Mouli, Pooja Vaidyanath	04:58
4.	"Jananam Nichi"	Vennelakanti	Yuvan Shankar Raja	Malathy Lakshman	04:37
5.	"Masss" (Remix)	Ramajogayya Sastry	Yuvan Shankar Raja, Premgi Amaren	Karthik, Sooraj Santosh, Premgi Amaren	05:51
6.	"Super Masss"	Sri Mani	S. Thaman	M. M. Manasi, Nivas	03:28
7.	"Masss Theme"	—	Yuvan Shankar Raja	Instrumental	02:02
8.	"Con Man Theme"	—	Yuvan Shankar Raja	Instrumental	02:23

== Reception ==
The soundtrack received positive reviews from critics. Behindwoods rated the soundtrack 3.25 out of 5 and noted that Prabhu and Yuvan's successful collaboration "strike again, this time with more experimentation and vivacity". Indiaglitz gave it 3 out of 5 and described it as "a reviving, soulful and definitely a chart-topper material". Subramanian Harikumar of Bollywoodlife.com also gave it three out of 5 "Yuvan's album has one or two standout numbers [...] which will stay with you even after a while you are done listening."

Akilan Nagarajan of Moviecrow gave 2.75 out of 5 to the album and stated "This album provides the right amount of coolness one would expect from a Yuvan Shankar Raja-Venkat Prabhu collaboration, but it just doesn't pull off the "awe" that these two have been providing all over the years. Not the powerhouse we wanted, but definitely the fun we needed." Karthik Srinivasan of Milliblog described it as "the weakest soundtrack among all Venkat Prabhu-Yuvan combos."

M Suganth of The Times of India found the songs to be "plain indulgences (the Thriller-like Poochandi is visually interesting but brings the story to a halt)". S. Saraswathi of Rediff.com wrote "Yuvan Shankar Raja's music keeps up with the tempo of the film." Anupama Subramanian of Deccan Chronicle wrote "Yuvan's background score warrants mention."
