= Judaai (song) =

2015 Hindi song

Song by Arijit Singh and Rekha Bhardwaj

from the album Badlapur
- Released: 23 January 2015
- Genre: Filmi, Indian pop
- Length: 4:31
- Label: Eros Now
- Composer: Sachin–Jigar
- Lyricists: Dinesh Vijan and Priya Saraiya

Badlapur track listing
- 1. "Jee Karda"; 2. "Jeena Jeena"; 3. "Jee Karda (Rock Version)"; 4. "Judaai"; 5. "Jeena Jeena (Remix)"

Music video
- "Judaai" on YouTube

"Judaai" (transl. Separation) is a Hindi song from the 2015 Hindi film Badlapur. Composed by Sachin–Jigar, the song is sung by Arijit Singh and Rekha Bhardwaj, with lyrics by Dinesh Vijan Priya Saraiya. The music video of the track features actors Varun Dhawan and Yami Gautam.

== Background and development ==
On 22 January 2015, The Times of India revealed that a track from the film titled "Judaai" will "complete the film's musical story" and marks the first collaboration of Arijit Singh and Rekha Bhardwaj in a duet. The duo had earlier worked in Barfi! (2012) where Bhardwaj and Singh performed the original and reprise version of the song "Phir Le Aya Dil" respectively. Apart from Barfi!, they also worked together in "Kabira" from Yeh Jawaani Hai Deewani (2013), where Bhardwaj performed the original version while Singh performed the encore version of the song.

The song was recorded on 9 January 2015 and was materialised in 90 minutes. Sachin Sanghvi from the composer duo Sachin–Jigar stated; "We waited six months to get Rekha Bhardwaj and Arijit Singh together for the first time for "Judaai". We knew that their voices would make the song unforgettable". Regarding Bhardwaj's recording experience with Sachin–Jigar, she mentioned; "They make me feel comfortable. As they composed the music keeping me in mind, I tried my best to deliver better. The way they have made me sing in a high octave, it is something which I could achieve only because of them".

The released music video consists of several snippets from the film, showcasing various phases of Raghu's (played by Varun Dhawan) life. According to India.com, the song "shows how one feels when they are separated from the one they love, especially under tragic circumstances". It was conceptualised as a setback where Dhawan reminiscence his past life with his wife and child. Dhawan, picking the song as his personal favourite song from the album declared that the "video of "Judaai" is actually what Badlapur is, that's how sensitive the film is".

== Release and response ==
"Judaai" was digitally released on 23 January 2015 as part of the soundtrack album of the film. The music video of the song was officially released on 2 February 2015, through the YouTube channel of Eros Now. "Judaai" was the third track released from the album, after "Jee Karda" and "Jeena Jeena".

=== Critical reception ===
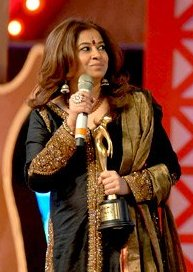
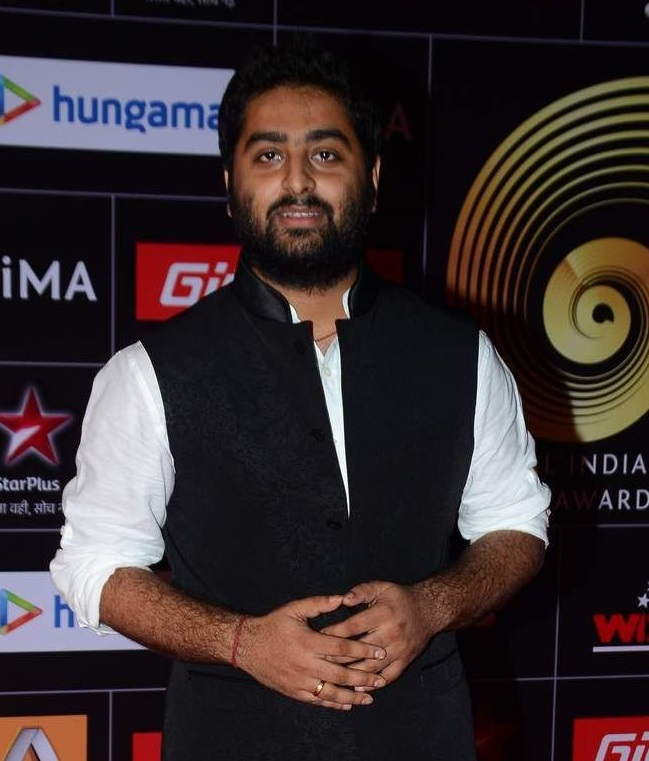
The duet collaboration between Bhardwaj (left) and Singh (right) was acclaimed by critics.

Joginder Tuteja writing from Rediff.com applauded the "unconventional pairing" of Bhardwaj and Singh: "Both singers are known for their quality output and it is good to hear them together in this offbeat duet". Further mentioning that the lyrics too are "unconventional", Tuteja opined that it "may not become a chartbuster, but it makes for good listening". Suanshu Khurana from The Indian Express mentioned how Sachin–Jigar broke the "monotony of Bharadwaj's folksy voice" by giving her a song where she has to stick to bass notes and not go beyond bass scale. Khurana felt that "Judaai" is packaged with Singh's voice, "who is his usual self". The Times of India's Kasmin Fernandes wrote; "Bhardwaj starts off the song with her restrained yet powerful vocals and the pace picks up when Singh comes on. It is a lounge song that gets a dreamy treatment with the sarangi that is heard throughout".

Rajiv Vijayakar from Bollywood Hungama expressed a mixed response to the lyrics of the song. Vijayakar thought the lyrics have an "unnecessarily high proportion" of Punjabi, though some of the "lines connect, with their simple familiar language". Regarding the vocals, Vijayakar affirmed that Singh "overshadows" Bhardwaj, "which does not happen every day, given her calibre and skills". Rucha Sharma of Daily News and Analysis stated; "In their first collaboration together, Arijit Singh and Rekha Bhardwaj take turns with the hook, Chadariya jheeni re jheeni and the result is spectacular. The use of the sarangi touches your heart".

According to Surabhi Redkar of Koimoi, "Judaai" proved "how versatile Sachin-Jigar are since they are also the composers who have given us peppy numbers in the past". He further commented that both Singh and Bhardwaj "give their best and the soft musical arrangements give it the required calm".
