= Jeena Jeena =

2015 Hindi song

- Jeena Jeena cover featuring actors Varun Dhawan, Yami Gautam and singer Atif Aslam

Song by Atif Aslam

from the album Badlapur
- Released: 15 January 2015
- Genre: Filmi, Indian pop
- Length: 3:49
- Label: Eros Music
- Composer: Sachin–Jigar
- Lyricists: Dinesh Vijan, Priya Saraiya

"Jeena Jeena" (transl. To live) is a Hindi song from the 2015 Hindi film Badlapur. Composed by Sachin–Jigar, the song is sung by Pakistani singer, Atif Aslam, with lyrics penned by Dinesh Vijan and Priya Saraiya. The music video of the track features actors Varun Dhawan, Yami Gautam and Atif Aslam. The song was one of the biggest hits of 2015. Within the song’s context the title signifies the protagonist’s journey of discovering the essence of life through love.

== Music video ==
The official music was released on 18 January 2015 by Eros Music on YouTube. It features Varun Dhawan, Yami Gautam and Atif Aslam.

== Release ==
The song was released on 15 January 2015, becoming a chart buster. It soon became one of the most successful Bollywood songs of 2015 and by Atif Aslam as well. It was his first Bollywood song since August 2014. The audio song was released on YouTube on 14 January 2015. The song broke records by remaining at the top spot on iTunes Indian Charts for 28 times, 99 times in top 10 and Radio Mirchi charts for 14 weeks consecutively.

== Chart performance ==
Chart (2014)	Peak position	Ref.
Mirchi Top 20 Chart	1	
Top Asian Download Charts	5	

=== Year-end charts ===
Chart (2014)	Position
Mirchi Top 100	2

== Track listing and formats ==
- Digital single
1. "Jeena Jeena" – 3:50
- Original Motion Picture Soundtrack
1. "Jeena Jeena" – 3:49
2. "Jeena Jeena (Remix Version)" – 3:39
