= Pyaar ki Pungi =

- Saif Ali Khan as featured in the song

Single by Pritam feat. Mika Singh

from the album Agent Vinod
- Language: Hindi
- Released: 29 February 2012
- Genre: Filmi, Pop-folk, Bhangra
- Length: 4:43
- Label: T-Series
- Composer: Pritam Chakraborty
- Lyricist: Amitabh Bhattacharya

Pyaar ki Pungi is a Hindi song sung by Mika Singh from the 2012 Hindi film Agent Vinod. It features Saif Ali Khan and Mallika Haydon. The song is composed by music director Pritam, while the lyrics are penned by lyricist Amitabh Bhattacharya. The moves are choreographed by Khan himself.

Wall Street Journal reported that the song had been topping the music charts in India in March 2012. India Today reported the song as viral hit while NDTV reported it as a superhit. On 14 March 2012, Hindustan Times reported that the song was "trending like hot cakes online" and was en route to the top of all the charts. The success of the song was credited by HT to its "comic cheeky and catchy tone".

== Production ==
Lead actor Saif Ali Khan describes the song as an extension to a scene where his character is being watched by CCTV cameras. Director Sriram Raghavan tells that he does not want to shift the viewers' attention from the main theme of the film, and hence the song will be used exclusively for promotional purposes. Choreographer Jasmeen Oza said that he wanted to give Saif a certain uniqueness in the steps, keeping him comfortable at the same time.

The song also features Mallika Haydon, who made her debut in Bollywood with this film. Mallika describes the song as "more of narration of the story", and says she does not have many moves in it.

After the song's release Pritam had stated, "One of the basic reasons of liking this number is the fact that it is a fun filled song. The song plays in the background during one of the scenes in Agent Vinod. Amitabh Bhattacharya came up with this fantastic hook ‘Pyar ki pungi’ which I am sure could be the next popular phrase among the youngsters". He then adds "Pungi is a musical instrument which is predominantly audible in the song. Hence, the name. The shehnai piece was also extensively used which was later layered with trumpet. It's a 6/8 song. Instead of making the musical treatment Indian, I kept it more darabuka, conga and claps oriented. So all in all, it is an out an out entertaining and crazy song".

According to BollySpice, the song was not initially planned to be included in the film. During the course of film production, Saif had done a few "insane dance moves" that were recorded into the CCTV cameras on the sets. A decision was made then, to include the song as "a mad number" in the film. According to the report, a few moments of fun had been converted into a song.

== Lyrics ==
Lyrics were written by lyricist Amitabh Bhattacharya. The song lyrics included several references to the story of Laila and Majnu with the words such as "Khidki pe koi khada hain, Laila ka taaka bhida hain."

== Video ==
According to the film makers the video has been filmed, "like a music video with a lot of colour, style and sultry dance moves." Saif plays the role of Agent Vinod in the film and does funny acts in the song as Majnu Vinod. The video starts with Saif being monitored by a team of spies from a control room, using CCTV cameras fitted in his hotel room. Saif recognized that he is being watched and started doing funny acts, deliberately in front of the camera. According to Saif, the song was included to extend this section of the story. In the video of the song, Saif is seen moving around the lobby and the staircase of a hotel. Malika appears in the song as the boss of the team of spies and takes a seat in the control room with other spies. She is shown in a seductive appearance, wearing a short skirt, deep neck shirt and a scarlet lipstick. Saif reaches and enters the control room of the spies, and fights with all the men while Mallika watches. After all the men are neutralized, Mallika approaches Saif with a smile and they move out of the room together holding each other in their arms.

Telegraph reported that this is similar to the video of Weapon of Choice by Fatboy Slim that starred Christopher Walken. In the Weapon of Choice's video, Walken wakes up from sleep and runs around in the lobby and escalator of a Hotel while dancing on the tunes of the song. The Walken's video also won best Direction and Best Choreography MTV music video award.

The Pungi song appears as a background piece in the movie. The song was shot to promote the movie on the Television and the internet. The song and the video also appear in the closing credits of the film.

== Reception ==
The song had been reported by Wall Street Journal, as topping the music charts in India in March 2012. On 14 March 2012, Hindustan Times (HT) reported that the song was "trending like hot cakes online" and was en route to the top of all the charts. The success of the song was credited by HT to its "comic cheeky and catchy tone". India Today reported the song as a chartbuster.

In 2019, Bollywoodlife reported this song among the top 5 songs sung by Mika Singh. It called Pyar ki Pungi as the "craziest song" of Mika's career, "which struck a chord with the masses.

In 2019, Bhojpuri film actor Dinesh Lal Yadav released a video of re-enactment of the song reported as superhit by NDTV. The re-enactment video was viral on social media. India Today reported the song as a hit song that was played in Bollywood events.

== Copyright case ==
There have been concerns raised about the song's alleged similarity to the song "Soosan Khanoom" by Iranian pop band Barobax who filed a copyright case in Indian court. Pritam refutes the allegations, saying that the two songs are not similar. The court noted that the song copyrights for the song Soosan Khanoom were not held by Borabax, hence the company did not have the locus standi needed for filing a copyright suit.

After some days, the band Barobax took back their concerns and apologized to Pritam, citing that the only similarly was the use of the Iranian beat at the start of the song.

== Accolades ==
Award	Category	Nominee	Result	Ref
2013 Zee Cine Award	Best Track of the Year	Pungi	Nominated	
2013 14th IIFA Awards	Best Male Playback Singer	Mika Singh (Pungi)	Nominated	
