= Players (2012 soundtrack) =

Soundtrack album by Pritam Chakraborty
- Released: 8 December 2011
- Recorded: 2010–2011
- Genre: Feature film soundtrack
- Length: 46:24
- Language: Hindi
- Label: T-Series
- Producer: Pritam Chakraborty

Pritam Chakraborty chronology
Mausam (2011)	Players (2011)	Agent Vinod (2012)

Players is the soundtrack album to the 2012 film of the same name directed by Abbas–Mustan, starring an ensemble cast of Vinod Khanna, Abhishek Bachchan, Bobby Deol, Sonam Kapoor, Bipasha Basu, Neil Nitin Mukesh, Sikandar Kher and Omi Vaidya. The film's soundtrack featured 10 songs composed by Pritam Chakraborty with lyrics written by Ashish Pandit. The album was released under the T-Series label on 8 December 2011 to positive reviews from critics.

== Development ==
The film's musical score was composed by Sandeep Shirodkar, while the 10-song soundtrack was composed by Pritam Chakraborty with lyrics written by Ashish Pandit. The film signified Pritam's third collaboration with Abbas–Mustan after Naqaab (2007) and Race (2008). Since their previous collaboration Race was successful, both in terms of commercial and the music, Pritam felt that he had to outdo it, with the music of Players as the comparison between the two films were inevitable. Pritam had several sittings with Abbas–Mustan for selecting the tunes and discussed on what tunes worked and what did not, where the director duo being confused on selecting the specific tune out of the multiple melodies he had composed for. Pritam stated that "I would love to work with Abbas–Mustan all my life. I have immense respect for them. Together we shall make sure that Players wins the musical race".

"'Tamma Tamma Loge' was really in contention. Since it sounds quite similar to 'Jumma Chumma' (both songs were actually based on Mory Kante's 'Tama Tama'), it was a no brainer to work on either of the two. However, the decision was soon reversed as much time had already been spent in contemplation and multi city promotional tour was keeping the cast busy as well. Abhishek, Sonam, Bipasha and Neil have been travelling extensively and it would have been impossible to shoot the song, edit, promote and then include in the final print".

— Pritam Chakraborty

The producers insisted on remixing the hit song "Jumma Chumma" from Amitabh Bachchan's film Hum (1991). However, the duo were not very keen on this, causing tension between them and the producers. There were also plans to remix the song "Tamma Tamma Loge" from Sanjay Dutt's Thanedaar (1990), but plans to remix the song were scrapped as there was less than two weeks before the release of the film.

== Release ==
The music rights were sold to T-Series for ₹35 million (US$360,000). The film's soundtrack was released digitally on 8 December 2011, which was followed by a physical launch event was held in Mumbai, four days later, which featured the lead actors Bachchan, Deol, Kapoor, Basu, Mukesh, Kher and Vaidya, performed the stunts live in a first-of-a-kind initiative.

== Reception ==
The soundtrack album received positive to mixed reviews. Joginder Tuteja of Bollywood Hungama gave it a rating of 3.5 out of 5 and wrote, "'Players' delivers what one expected from it. The need of the situation was to have a racy score that complements the fast paced story telling of Abbas-Mustan. The song which has the most potential is 'Dil Ye Bekarar Kyun Hai', others would work as instant coffee that would keep the momentum up for the film's narrative". Sukanya Verma from Rediff.com gave the album 2.5 out of 5 stars and said, "After four very popular albums this year, Ready, Bodyguard, Dum Maaro Dum and Mausam, Pritam dishes out yet another album that is a mix of sure-shot winners and drab space fillers." Karthik Srinivasan of Milliblog wrote "Pritam does what he's good at, admirably well, in Players."

Nikhat Kazmi of The Times of India wrote "Music by Pritam is good while it lasts". Piyali Dasgupta of NDTV wrote "Don't expect much from Pritam's music – there's none of the head-bobbing of Dhoom 2 or Race." A reviewer from Zee News summarized "In terms of background score, for the first time in Abbas Mustan film, the music appears weak."

== Track listing ==
No.	Title	Singer(s)	Length
1.	"Jis Jagah Pe Khatam" (Players Theme)	Neeraj Shridhar, Siddharth Basrur, Mauli Dave	4:12
2.	"Jhoom Jhoom Ta Ja"	Ritu Pathak	5:02
3.	"Ho Gayi Tun"	Yashita Yashpal, Bob	3:47
4.	"Buddhi Do Bhagwaan"	Shruti Pathak, Abhishek Bachchan	4:42
5.	"Dil Yeh Bekaraar Kyun Hai"	Mohit Chauhan, Shreya Ghoshal	4:38
6.	"Jhoom Jhoom Ta Hoon Main"	Siddharth Basrur	4:49
7.	"Dil Yeh Bekaraar Kyun Hai" (Reprise)	Nikhil D'Souza, Priyani Vani	5:17
8.	"Jhoom Jhoom Ta Hoon Main" (Film Version)	Arijit Singh	5:09
9.	"Jis Jagah Pe Khatam" (Remix)	Neeraj Shridhar, Siddharth Basrur, Mauli Dave	3:30
10.	"Dil Yeh Bekaraar Kyun Hai" (Remix)	Mohit Chauhan, Shreya Ghoshal, Nikhil D'Souza	5:17
Total length:			46:24
