= Priya Saraiya =

Indian singer and lyricist

- Born: Priya Panchal; 19 November 1984 (age 41); Mumbai, India
- Occupations: Singer, lyricist
- Years active: 1990–present
- Spouse: Jigar Saraiya (m. 2013)

Priya Saraiya (born 19 November 1984) is an Indian playback singer and lyricist in Bollywood. She is also a live stage singer for Hindi cinema and Gujarati songs.

== Education and early life ==
=== Music education ===
Priya Saraiya also known as Priya Panchal started singing at the age of six. She took Hindustani Classical vocal training from Gandharva Mahavidyalaya, Mumbai. She has trained in western music from Trinity College of Music, London's branch in Mumbai.

As a child artist, she travelled extensively with music directors Kalyanji–Anandji's group - Little Wonders/ Little Stars, performing in live stage shows all over the world. She also trained under them.

== Personal life ==
She is married to the musician Jigar Saraiya of the music duo Sachin–Jigar, who are also her most frequent collaborators for Bollywood songs.

== Songs ==
=== Playback singer ===
| Year | No. | Film | Title | Ref. |
|---|---|---|---|---|
| 2011 | 1 | F.A.L.T.U | Gale Laga Le | |
| 2011 | 2 | Shor In The City | Karma Is A Bitch | |
| 2012 | 3 | Tere Naal Love Ho Gaya | Tere Naal Love Ho Gaya | |
| 2012 | 4 | Tere Naal Love Ho Gaya | Tu Mohabbat Hai | |
| 2012 | 5 | Tere Naal Love Ho Gaya | Piya O Re Piya (Sad) | |
| 2013 | 6 | Jayantabhai Ki Luv Story | Hai Na | |
| 2013 | 7 | ABCD | Bezubaan | |
| 2013 | 8 | Go Goa Gone | Khoon Choosle | |
| 2013 | 9 | Shuddh Desi Romance | Gulabi | |
| 2013 | 10 | Shuddh Desi Romance | Love In Jaipur | |
| 2014 | 11 | Entertainment | Johnny Johnny | |
| 2014 | 12 | Happy Ending | Jaise Mera Tu | |
| 2014 | 13 | Khoobsurat | Maa Ka Phone | composed by Sneha Khanwalkar |
| 2015 | 14 | Badlapur | Sone Ki Paani | |
| 2015 | 15 | Badlapur | Badla Badla | |
| 2015 | 16 | ABCD 2 | Sun Saathiya | |
| 2015 | 17 | Hero | Khoya Khoya | |
| 2017 | 18 | Haseena Parker | Tere Bina | |
| 2017 | 19 | Haseena Parker | Tere Bina (Sad) | |
| 2017 | 20 | A Gentleman | Baat Ban Jaye | |
| 2019 | 21 | Made in China | Valaam | |
| 2019 | 22 | Made in China | Valaam (Unplugged) | |
| 2021 | 23 | Chandigarh Kare Aashiqui | Kalle Kalle | |
| 2021 | 24 | Chandigarh Kare Aashiqui | Attraction | |
| 2022 | 25 | Jayeshbhai Jordaar | Dheere Dheere Seekh Jaunga | composed by Vishal-Shekhar |

=== Lyricist ===
| Year | Film | Title | Ref. |
|---|---|---|---|
| 2011 | F.A.L.T.U | Gale Laga Le | |
| 2011 | F.A.L.T.U | Nayi Subah | |
| 2011 | F.A.L.T.U | Beh Chala | |
| 2011 | F.A.L.T.U | Aawaz Do | |
| 2011 | Shor In The City | Saibo | Along with Sameer |
| 2011 | Shor In The City | Karma Is A Bitch | Along with Sameer |
| 2011 | Shor In The City | Shor Mein Hai Sukoon | Along with Sameer |
| 2011 | Hum Tum Shabana | Hey Na Na Shabana | |
| 2011 | Hum Tum Shabana | Music Bandh Na Karo | |
| 2011 | Yeh Dooriyan | Baat jo Thi | composed by Sajid-Wajid |
| 2012 | Tere Naal Love Ho Gaya | Piya O Re Piya | |
| 2012 | Tere Naal Love Ho Gaya | Jeene De | |
| 2012 | Tere Naal Love Ho Gaya | Tu Mohabbat Hai | |
| 2012 | Tere Naal Love Ho Gaya | Fan Ban Gayi | |
| 2012 | Tere Naal Love Ho Gaya | Piya O Re Piya (Sad) | |
| 2012 | Ajab Gazabb Love | Boom Boom | composed by Sajid-Wajid |
| 2012 | Ajab Gazabb Love | Nachde Punjabi | |
| 2013 | Ramaiya Vastavaiya | Bairiya | |
| 2013 | Ramaiya Vastavaiya | Jeene Laga Hoon | |
| 2013 | Ramaiya Vastavaiya | Rang Jo Lagyo | |
| 2013 | Ramaiya Vastavaiya | Jadoo Ki Jhappi | |
| 2013 | Ramaiya Vastavaiya | Hip Hop Pammi | |
| 2013 | Ramaiya Vastavaiya | Peecha Chhute | |
| 2013 | Any Body Can Dance | Mann Basiyo Sawariyo | |
| 2013 | Jayantabhai Ki Luv Story | Aa Bhi Ja Mere | |
| 2013 | Jayantabhai Ki Luv Story | Dil Na Jane Kyun | |
| 2013 | Jayantabhai Ki Luv Story | Thoda Thoda | |
| 2013 | Jayantabhai Ki Luv Story | Hey Na | |
| 2013 | Go Goa Gone | Khushamdeed | |
| 2013 | Go Goa Gone | Slowly Slowly | |
| 2013 | Ishkq In Paris | Teri Chudiyan Di | composed by Sajid-Wajid |
| 2014 | Entertainment | Tera Naam Doon | |
| 2014 | Entertainment | Tera Naam Doon (Sad) | |
| 2014 | Happy Ending | Mileya Mileya | |
| 2014 | Happy Ending | Jaise Mera Tu | |
| 2014 | Happy Ending | Haseena Kamina | |
| 2015 | Badlapur | Jee Karda | |
| 2015 | Badlapur | Jeena Jeena | |
| 2015 | Badlapur | Judaai | |
| 2015 | Badlapur | Badla Badla | |
| 2015 | Badlapur | Sone Ka Paani | |
| 2015 | ABCD 2 | Sun Saathiya | |
| 2016 | A Flying Jatt | Toota Jo Kabhi | |
| 2016 | A Flying Jatt | Khair Mangda | |
| 2016 | A Flying Jatt | Raj Karega Khalsa | |
| 2017 | Meri Pyari Bindu | Haareya | |
| 2017 | Hindi Medium | Hoor | |
| 2017 | A Gentleman | Baat Ban Jaye | |
| 2017 | A Gentleman | Laagi Na Choote | |
| 2017 | Simran | Simran Title Track | |
| 2017 | Simran | Baras Ja | |
| 2017 | Simran | Pinjra Tod Ke | |
| 2017 | Simran | Meet | |
| 2017 | Bhoomi | Daag | |
| 2017 | Bhoomi | Lag Ja Gale | |
| 2017 | Bhoomi | Kho Diya Hai | |
| 2017 | Bhoomi | Trippy Trippy | |
| 2017 | Haseena Parker | Tere Bina | |
| 2017 | Haseena Parker | Tere Bina (Sad) | |
| 2019 | Arjun Patiala | Sacchiyan Mohabbatan | |
| 2019 | Made in China | Valaam | |
| 2019 | Made in China | Valaam (Unplugged) | |
| 2019 | Bala | Pyaar Toh Tha | |
| 2020 | Street Dancer 3D | Illegal Weapon 2.0 | composed by Tanishk Bagchi |
| 2020 | Street Dancer 3D | Dua Karo | |
| 2020 | Angrezi Medium | Kudi Nu Nachne De | |
| 2020 | Angrezi Medium | Ladki | |
| 2020 | Shakuntala Devi | Paheli | Amazon Prime Video film |
| 2020 | Shakuntala Devi | Jhilmil Piya | Amazon Prime Video film |
| 2021 | Shiddat | Barbadiyan | Disney Plus Hotstar film |
| 2021 | Bhoot Police | Pyaar Pyaar Hai | Disney Plus Hotstar film |
| 2021 | Chandigarh Kare Aashiqui | Kalle Kalle | |
| 2021 | Chandigarh Kare Aashiqui | Maafi | |
| 2021 | Chandigarh Kare Aashiqui | Attraction | |
| 2021 | Chandigarh Kare Aashiqui | Maafi - Vibe Mix | |
| 2022 | Maja Ma | Boom Padi | composed by Siddharth Mahadevan, Souumil Shringarpure; Amazon Prime Video film |
| 2022 | Maja Ma | Boom Padi (Electronic Version); Along with Lil Sidely | composed by Siddharth Mahadevan, Souumil Shringarpure; Amazon Prime Video film |
| 2022 | Maja Ma | Song of Celebration | composed by Siddharth Mahadevan, Souumil Shringarpure; Amazon Prime Video film |
| 2023 | Farzi | Sab Farzi | Amazon Prime Video web series |
| 2023 | Ganapath | Hum Aaye Hain | Composed by White Noise Studios |
| 2023 | Ganapath | Sara Zamana | Composed by White Noise Studios |
| 2023 | Jaane Jaan | Dooriyan | Netflix film |
| 2024 | Murder Mubarak | Yaad Aave | Netflix film |
| 2024 | Murder Mubarak | Killer Killer | Netflix film |
| 2024 | Murder Mubarak | Bhola Bhala Baby | Netflix film |
| 2024 | Murder Mubarak | Murder Mubarak - Title Track | Netflix film |
| 2024 | Vicky Vidya Ka Woh Wala Video | "Tum Jo Mile Ho" | |
| 2024 | Vicky Vidya Ka Woh Wala Video | "Mere Mehboob" | |
| 2024 | Vicky Vidya Ka Woh Wala Video | "Marjaaniya" | |
| 2024 | Vicky Vidya Ka Woh Wala Video | "Marjaaniya 2" | |
| 2024 | Vicky Vidya Ka Woh Wala Video | "Marjaaniya 3" | |

=== Other songs as lyricist ===
| Year | Details | Title of Song | Ref. |
|---|---|---|---|
| 2015 | Coke Studio @ MTV Season 4 | Bannado | |
| 2015 | Coke Studio @ MTV Season 4 | Laadki | |
| 2019 | T-Series Single - Dhvani Bhanushali | Main Teri Hoon | |
| 2021 | Mujhe Pyaar Pyaar Hai | Bhoot Police | |
| 2023 | Sab Farzi | Farzi | |

=== Other appearances ===
| No. | Year | Details | Ref. |
| 1 | 2015 | MTV Unplugged Season 4 Episode 7 | |
| 2 | 2017 | MTV Unplugged Season 6 Episode 4 | |
| 3 | 2019 | MTV Unplugged Season 8 Episode 8 | |

=== Independent song as composer, singer, lyricist ===
1. Birdaadi (Gujarati Language)
2. Loot (Hindi Language)

== Awards and nominations ==
| Year | Category | Nominated Song | Film | Result | Ref(s) |
|---|---|---|---|---|---|
Filmfare Awards
| 2015 | Best Female Playback Singer | "Sun Saathiya" | ABCD 2 | Nominated | |
Mirchi Music Awards
| 2011 | Upcoming Lyricist of The Year | "Baat Jo Thi…(Yeh Dooriyan)" | Yeh Dooriyaan | Nominated | |
| 2012 | Upcoming Female Vocalist of The Year | "Piya O Re Piya (Sad)" | Tere Naal Love Ho Gaya | Nominated | |
| 2015 | Album of The Year | - | ABCD 2 | Nominated | |
| 2015 | Album of The Year | - | Badlapur | Nominated | |
Global Indian Music Academy Awards
| 2015 | Best Duet | "Sun Saathiya" | ABCD 2 | Nominated | |
