= Eros Music =

Indian record label

Eros Now Music
- Type: Divisions
- Industry: Music; Film; Entertainment
- Founded: 2006; 20 years ago in Mumbai, India
- Founder: Deepak Bal
- Headquarters: Mumbai, India
- Area served: Wolrldwide (mainly India)
- Key people: Deepak Bal
- Services: Music production and distribution
- Owner: Eros Media World
- Parent: Eros International

Eros Now Music is an Indian music studio and distributor based in Mumbai, India. It is the dependent and domestic music label of Eros International, an Indian film production and distribution company owned by Eros Media World.

== History ==
Eros Music was founded in 2006. It is primarily known for Bollywood music soundtracks and songs. Omkara is the first film whose music and soundtrack was produced by Eros Music.

As of 2025, most films labeled by Eros Music have transferred to Sony Music India after being acquired from a major catalog portion from Eros in 2020.

== Film music and soundtracks produced or acquired by Eros Now Music ==
Followings are the list of music albums produced by Eros Now Music.

Year	Film	Language
2006	Omkara	Hindi
2006	I See You	Hindi
2007	Bombay to Goa	Hindi
2007	No Smoking	Hindi
2007	Dus Kahaniyaan	Hindi
2008	U Me Aur Hum	Hindi
2008	Hijack	Hindi
2008	Drona	Hindi
2008	Heroes	Hindi
2009	Aa Dekhen Zara	Hindi
2009	Tera Mera Ki Rishta	Punjabi
2009	Kambakkht Ishq	Hindi
2009	Love Aaj Kal	Hindi
2009	Vaada Raha …I Promise	Hindi
2009	Aladin	Hindi
2009	De Dana Dan	Hindi
2009	Heer Ranjha	Punjabi
2010	Veer	Hindi
2010	Toonpur Ka Superhero	Hindi
2010	No Problem	Hindi
2011	Chalo Dilli	Hindi
2011	Ra.One	Hindi / Tamil / Telugu
2011	Rockstar	Hindi
2011	Desi Boyz	Hindi
2012	Agent Vinod	Hindi
2012	Taur Mittran Di	Punjabi
2012	Teri Meri Kahaani	Hindi
2012	Cocktail	Hindi
2012	Shirin Farhad Ki Toh Nikal Padi	Hindi
2012	English Vinglish	Tamil/Hindi
2012	Khiladi 786	Hindi
2013	Table No. 21	Hindi
2013	Saadi Love Story	Punjabi
2013	Go Goa Gone	Hindi
2013	Raanjhanaa	Hindi
2013	Warning	Hindi
2013	R... Rajkumar	Hindi
2014	Kaththi	Tamil
2014	Lingaa	Tamil
2014	Lekar Hum Deewana Dil	Hindi
2014	Action Jackson	Hindi
2015	Shamitabh	Hindi
2015	Tevar	Hindi
2015	Tanu Weds Manu: Returns	Hindi
2015	Badlapur	Hindi
2015	NH10	Hindi
2015	Darling	Tamil
2015	Mere Haaniya	Punjabi
2015	Tamiluku En Ondrai Aluthavum	Tamil
2015	Pencil	Tamil
2015	Massu Engira Masilamani	Tamil
2015	Narathan	Tamil
2015	Life of Josutty	Malayalam
2015	Asurakulam	Tamil
2015	Mukhtiar Chadha	Punjabi
2015	Shareek	Punjabi
2015	Bajirao Mastani	Hindi
2016	Happy Bhag Jayegi	Hindi
2016	Sanam Teri Kasam	Hindi
2016	Dictator	Telugu
2016	White	Malayalam
2016	Sardaar Gabbar Singh	Telugu
2016	24	Tamil
2016	Metro	Tamil
2016	Olappeeppi	Malayalam
2016	Banjo	Hindi
2016	Guru	Hindi
2017	Sarkar 3	Hindi
2017	Munna Michael	Hindi
2017	Shubh Mangal Saavdhan	Hindi
2017	Mukkabaaz	Hindi
2017	Si3	Hindi
2017	Enkitta Mothathe	Tamil
2017	Pirai Thaediya Naatkal	Tamil
2017	Mersal	Tamil
2017	Singam III: Si3	Tamil
2017	Ner Vazhi	Tamil
2017	Oru Kidayin Karunai Manu	Tamil
2018	Alinagarer Golokdhadha	Bengali
2018	Meri Nimmo	Hindi
2018	Bhavesh Joshi Superhero	Hindi
2018	Happy Phirr Bhag Jayegi	Hindi
2018	Manmarziyaan	Hindi / Punjabi
2019	Laal Kaptaan	Hindi
2021	Kaadan	Tamil / Hindi / Telugu
