= Colonel (Pakistan) =

Rank in Pakistani Army

Colonel is a senior officer rank in the Pakistan Army. Said army's rank system is predominantly following the British Army rank and insignia system since Pakistan's independence from the British Empire in 1947. However, the crown in the insignia has been replaced with a star and crescent, which symbolize the sovereignty of the Government of Pakistan.

The rank of colonel is equivalent to a captain in the Pakistan Navy and a group captain in the Pakistan Air Force. Like in other armies, the rank is higher than a lieutenant colonel and lower than a brigadier.

Uniform insignia
Rank	Colonel
NATO equivalent	OF-5

Pakistani officer ranks
Rank	Field marshal (5-star)	General (4-star)	Lieutenant general (3-star)	Major general (2-star)	Brigadier (1-star)	Colonel	Lieutenant colonel	Major	Captain	Lieutenant	Second lieutenant
NATO equivalent	OF-10	OF-9	OF-8	OF-7	OF-6	OF-5	OF-4	OF-3	OF-2	OF-1	OF-1
Uniform insignia
