= Badlapur (film) =

2015 Indian film by Sriram Raghavan

- Theatrical release poster
- Directed by: Sriram Raghavan
- Written by: Sriram Raghavan; Arijit Biswas; Pooja Ladha Surti
- Story by: Massimo Carlotto
- Based on: Death's Dark Abyss by Massimo Carlotto
- Produced by: Dinesh Vijan; Sunil Lullaa
- Starring: Varun Dhawan; Nawazuddin Siddiqui; Huma Qureshi; Radhika Apte; Yami Gautam; Divya Dutta
- Cinematography: Anil Mehta
- Edited by: Pooja Ladha Surti
- Music by: Sachin–Jigar
- Production company: Maddock Films
- Distributed by: Eros International
- Release date: 20 February 2015
- Running time: 135 minutes
- Country: India
- Language: Hindi
- Budget: ₹16 crore
- Box office: est. ₹103 crore

Badlapur (stylized as बदलाPUR) (transl. City of Revenge), subtitled on screen as Don't Miss The Beginning, is a 2015 Indian Hindi-language crime thriller film directed by Sriram Raghavan and produced by Dinesh Vijan and Sunil Lulla under Maddock Films and Eros International. Based on the novel Death's Dark Abyss by Italian writer Massimo Carlotto, the film stars Varun Dhawan and Nawazuddin Siddiqui, with Huma Qureshi, Yami Gautam, Vinay Pathak, Kumud Mishra, Divya Dutta and Radhika Apte in supporting roles.

Badlapur was released on 20 February 2015 to positive reviews from critics. The film grossed approximately ₹103 crore (US$11 million) worldwide and became a commercial success. On 11 January 2016, the film was nominated for Best Film in the 61st Filmfare Awards, as well as other categories. Over the years, it has come to be widely regarded as a modern classic, with Dhawan's performance being hailed as his best in the early stages of his career.

== Plot ==
Two friends, Liaq and Harman, rob a bank in Pune and steal a car belonging to Misha and her son Robin. During the chase that follows, Robin falls out of the car and Misha gets shot. According to their plan, Harman escapes while the police, led by Inspector Govind, arrest Liaq. Both Misha and Robin die, leaving Raghav "Raghu" Purohit, Misha's husband and Robin's father devastated. He attacks Liaq in prison and approaches a private detective who tells him about Liaq's girlfriend, a sex worker named Jhimli. Raghu offers all the insurance money he received from his son's death in exchange for Liaq's partner's name, but Jhimli refuses. Enraged, he sexually assaults her. Liaq is convicted for the robbery and sentenced to jail, while Raghu withdraws from society and begins living a reclusive life far from Pune.

Fifteen years later, Liaq becomes terminally ill and wishes to spend his remaining life with his mother Zeenat. Raghu is approached by a social worker, Shobha, who asks him to forgive Liaq, but he declines. Zeenat later catches up with Raghu and tells him Liaq's partner's name, wanting her son to be paroled on compassionate grounds. Liaq is paroled but trailed by one of Inspector Govind's subordinates in plainclothes form, so as to trace Harman. Raghu locates Harman and is invited to lunch by Harman's wife Kanchan "Koko" Khatri, where his true intentions are revealed. Harman denies having killed Misha and Robin and Koko pleads that he spare them. Raghu demands she sleep with him in exchange. He takes her to the bedroom and exacts revenge by making Koko strip and forcing her to scream to make Harman believe they're having sex.

Liaq contacts Harman for his share of the money but Raghu murders Koko and Harman with a hammer. He then goes to meet Shobha and pretends to be in love with her, creating the perfect alibi. Liaq learns that Zeenat gave Harman's name to Raghu in exchange for his freedom. Shobha is enraged to learn that Raghu told the cops they had sex. A fight ensues between Raghu and Liaq, culminating in the latter initially overpowering the former until he is himself subdued after Raghu gains an upper hand. Liaq reveals that he did kill Raghu's family but more in a moment sheer panic unlike Raghu, who he points out, planned his murders with a cool mind and without guilt.

Liaq goes to meet Jhimli, now the concubine of a local businessman, Patil, one last time before his death. Having circumstantial evidence against Raghu, Inspector Govind tries to blackmail him into giving him Liaq's share of the money. However, Liaq walks into the police station and takes the blame for Raghu's crimes, giving Raghu a second chance to live life while redeeming himself.

After seven months, Liaq succumbs to cancer in jail and Jhimli makes Raghu realize the futility of his revenge. She drives away with Patil, leaving Raghu standing in the rain.

== Cast ==
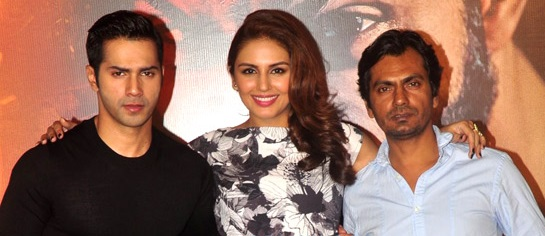
(L-R)Varun Dhawan, Huma Qureshi, Nawazuddin Siddiqui.

- Varun Dhawan as Raghav Purohit
- Nawazuddin Siddiqui as Layaq
- Huma Qureshi as Janki "Jhimli" Dagaonkar, a sex-worker who is Liaq's girlfriend
- Yami Gautam as Misha Senthil Purohit, Raghu's wife
- Divya Dutta as Shobha
- Vinay Pathak as Harman
- Radhika Apte as Kanchan "Koko" Khatri
- Ashwini Kalsekar as Mrs. Joshi
- Murali Sharma as Michael Dada
- Pratima Kazmi as Zeenat Mohammed Tungrekar, Liaq's mother
- Zakir Hussain as Shardul Patil, a businessman who later employs Jhimli as a concubine
- Kumud Mishra as Inspector Govind
- Neel Tyagi as Robin Purohit, Raghu's son

== Production ==
The film began shooting in May 2014.

The film prominently features several locations in Pune. Notable scenes include an intense car chase sequence filmed in the Camp area, and a pivotal moment where Yami Gautam’s character reveals her pregnancy to Varun Dhawan, which was shot at Cafe Columbia. The couple’s residence is depicted as being located on Prabhat Road.

Several jail scenes in the film were shot on location at Nashik Jail, where the cast and crew spent two days filming inside the institution alongside real inmates. Scenes were filmed in the jail kitchen, carpentry workshop, and laundry, drawing on the inmates’ knowledge of the facility to lend realism to the production.

== Reception ==
=== Critical reception ===
On review aggregation website Rotten Tomatoes, the film has a rating of 92%, based on 8 reviews, with an average rating of 7/10.

Raja Sen from Rediff.com rated it 4 out of 5 and said "Badlapur is a dark, unflinching, fantastic film." Sudhish Kamath from The Hindu wrote that the film was "darkly ambitious and very well made." Rachit Gupta from Filmfare stated that it had "exhilarating performances, stellar storytelling."

Saibal Chatterjee of NDTV rated it 3/5 and noted the pervasive contemptful treatment of women in the film, writing, "If one can ignore the overt misogyny on show all through the film, Badlapur throws up enough surprises to hold the viewer's interest right until the bitter end."

Mohar Basu of The Times of India rated Badlapur 4 out of 5. Shubhra Gupta of The Indian Express rated the movie 2.5 stars out of 5, describing it as riveting, but also noting that the film "comes off too contrived in many places, and leaves us hanging in others." Rajeev Masand and Md Abidur Rahaman of CNN-IBN rated it 3.5 out of 5 and wrote: "The pace slackens post-intermission, plot contrivances are many, and you might say the film is misogynistic in its treatment of women ... [However], the film keeps you on your toes, curious to see where its twists and turns will lead."

=== Box office ===
Box Office India reported that Badlapur grossed approximately ₹103.3 crore (US$11 million) worldwide.

== Soundtrack ==
The soundtrack and background score of Badlapur is composed entirely by Sachin–Jigar, while the lyrics were written by Dinesh Vijan and Priya Saraiya; it marks the first Sriram Raghavan film since Ek Hasina Thi (2004) to feature the same composers on both aspects of the music. The first song, "Jee Karda", was released as a single on 9 December 2014. The song "Jeena Jeena" was released on 14 February 2015. Jeena Jeena reached number one on the Indian iTunes charts, Radio Mirchi charts, for several weeks.

== Awards and nominations ==
Award	Category	Recipients and nominees	Result	Ref.
8th Mirchi Music Awards	Album of The Year	Sachin–Jigar, Dinesh Vijan, Priya Saraiya	Nominated	
8th Mirchi Music Awards	Best Song Producer (Programming & Arranging)	Sachin–Jigar – "Jee Karda"	Nominated	
61st Filmfare Awards	Best Film	Dinesh Vijan, Sunil Lulla	Nominated	
61st Filmfare Awards	Best Director	Sriram Raghavan	Nominated	
61st Filmfare Awards	Best Actor	Varun Dhawan	Nominated	
61st Filmfare Awards	Best Supporting Actor	Nawazuddin Siddiqui	Nominated	
61st Filmfare Awards	Best Supporting Actress	Huma Qureshi	Nominated	
61st Filmfare Awards	Best Singer – Male	Atif Aslam for "Jeena Jeena"	Nominated	
