= 61st Filmfare Awards =

2016 awards for Hindi cinema

- 61st Filmfare Awards
- Date: 15 January 2016
- Site: NSCI Dome, Mumbai, Maharashtra
- Hosted by: Shah Rukh Khan; Kapil Sharma
- Official website: www.filmfare.com

Highlights
- Best Film: Bajirao Mastani
- Critics Award for Best Film: Piku
- Most awards: Bajirao Mastani (9)
- Most nominations: Bajirao Mastani (14)

Television coverage
- Network: Sony Entertainment Television (India)
- Duration: 173 minutes

The 61st Filmfare Awards were held to honour the best Bollywood films of 2015 on 15 January 2016 at NSCI Dome in Mumbai. The ceremony was hosted by Shah Rukh Khan and Kapil Sharma.

Bajirao Mastani led the ceremony with 14 nominations, followed by Piku with 8 nominations, Tanu Weds Manu Returns with 7 nominations and Badlapur with 6 nominations respectively.

Bajirao Mastani won 9 awards including Best Film, Best Director (for Sanjay Leela Bhansali), Best Actor (for Ranveer Singh) and Best Supporting Actress (for Priyanka Chopra), thus becoming the most-awarded film at the ceremony.

Other major winners included Piku with 5 awards, Dum Laga Ke Haisha, Roy, Talvar, and Tanu Weds Manu Returns with 2, and Bajrangi Bhaijaan, Bombay Velvet, Dil Dhadakne Do, Hero, Masaan and Tamasha with 1.

Deepika Padukone received dual nominations for Best Actress for her performances in Bajirao Mastani and Piku, winning for the latter.

Priyanka Chopra, who won Best Supporting Actress for Bajirao Mastani, became the first actress to win Filmfare Awards in 5 different competitive acting categories.

== Winners and nominees ==
The nominations were announced on 11 January 2016.

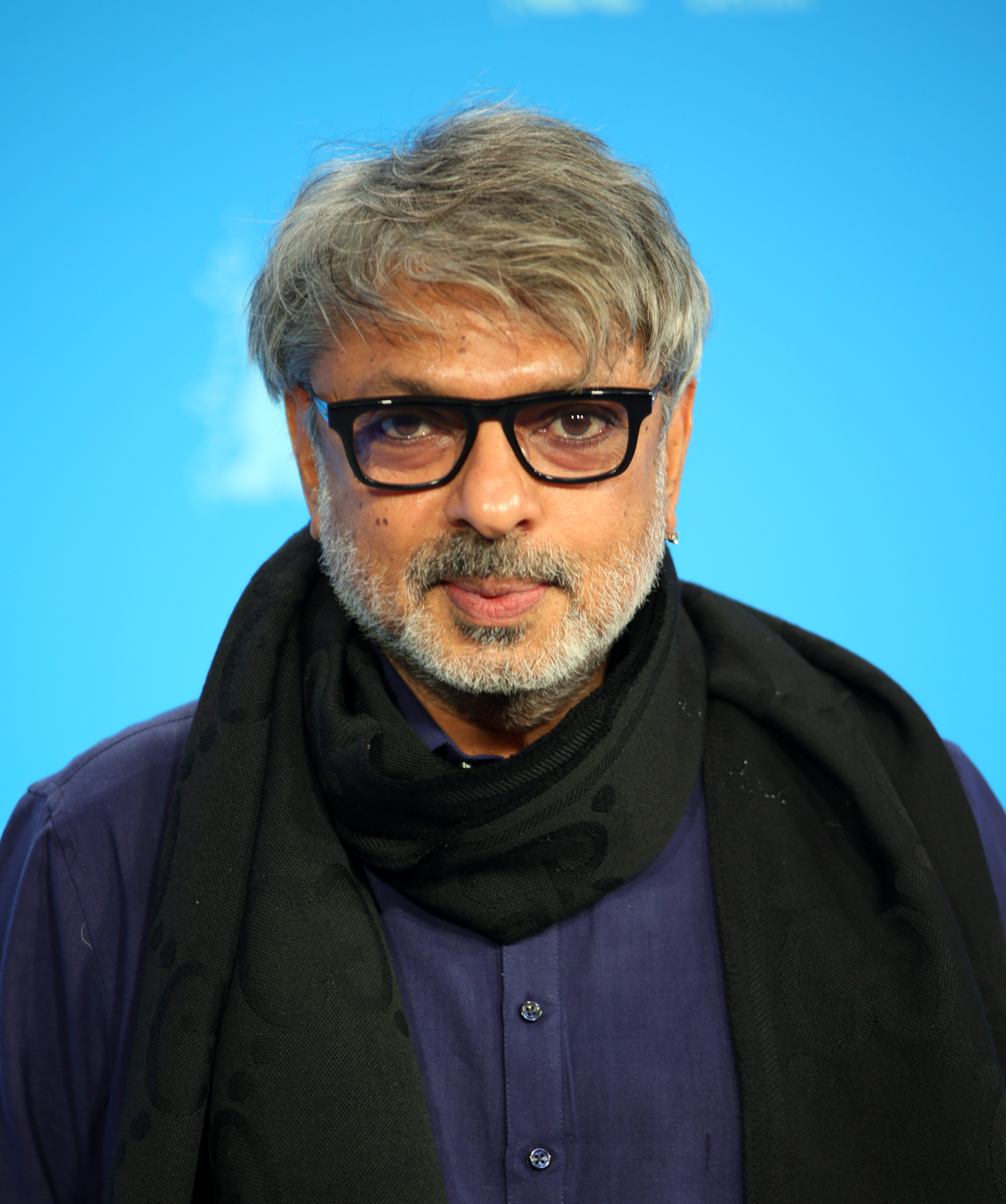
Sanjay Leela Bhansali, Best Director

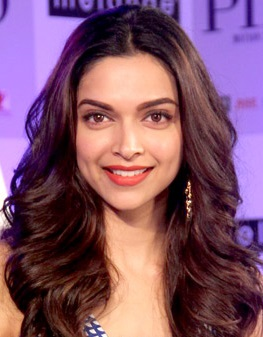
Deepika Padukone, Best Actress

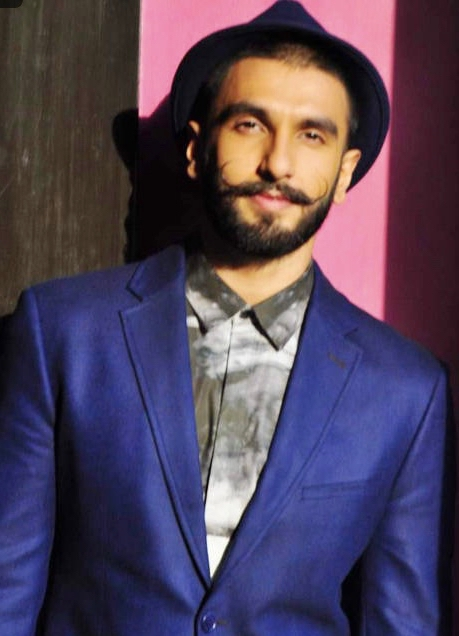
Ranveer Singh, Best Actor

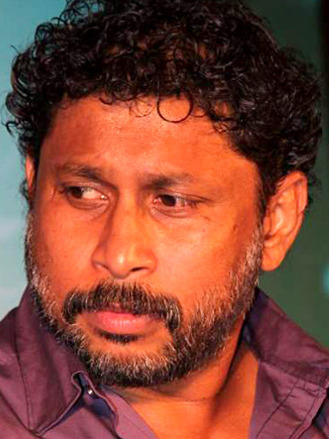
Shoojit Sircar, Best Director Critics

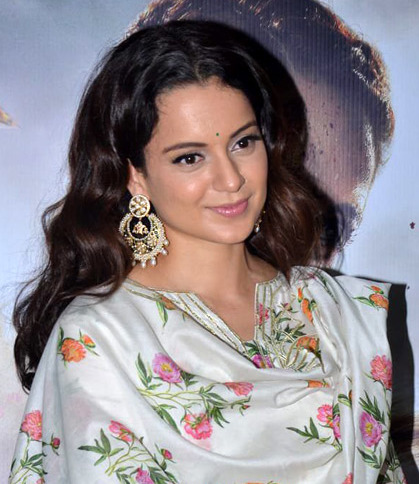
Kangana Ranaut, Best Actress Critics

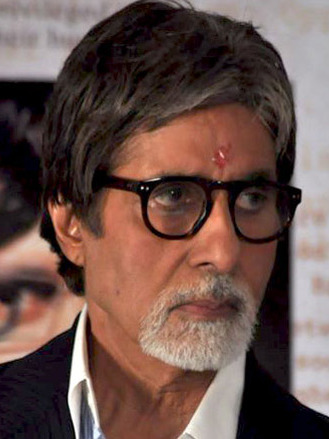
Amitabh Bachchan, Best Actor Critics

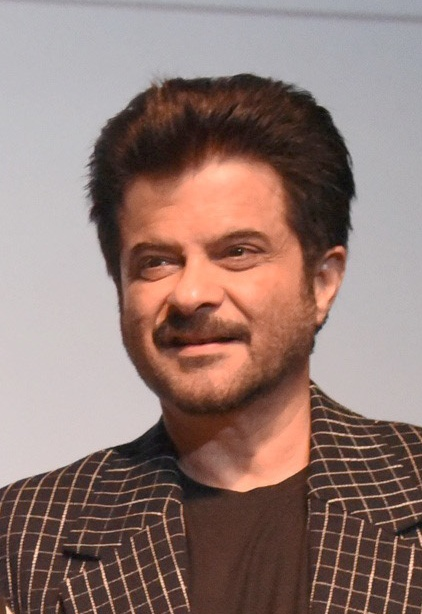
Anil Kapoor, Best Supporting Actor

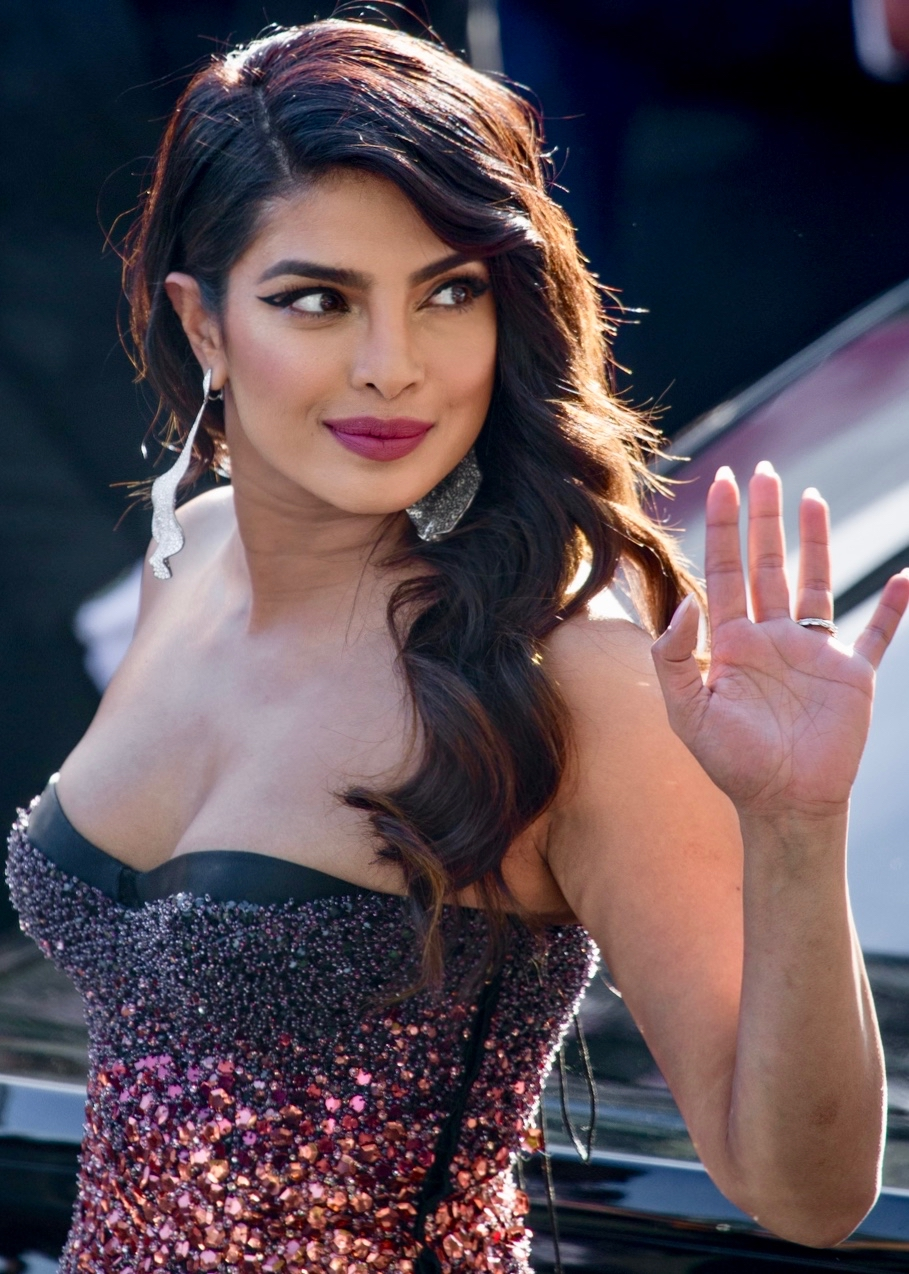
Priyanka Chopra, Best Supporting Actress

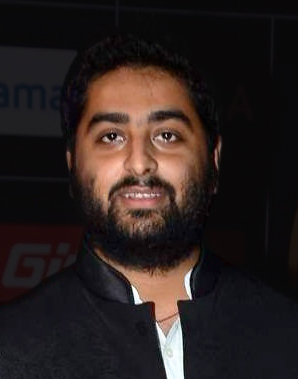
Arijit Singh, Best Male Playback Singer

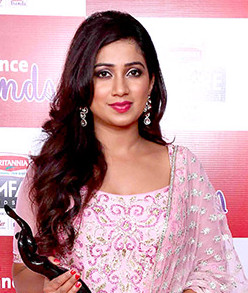
Shreya Ghosal, Best Female Playback Singer

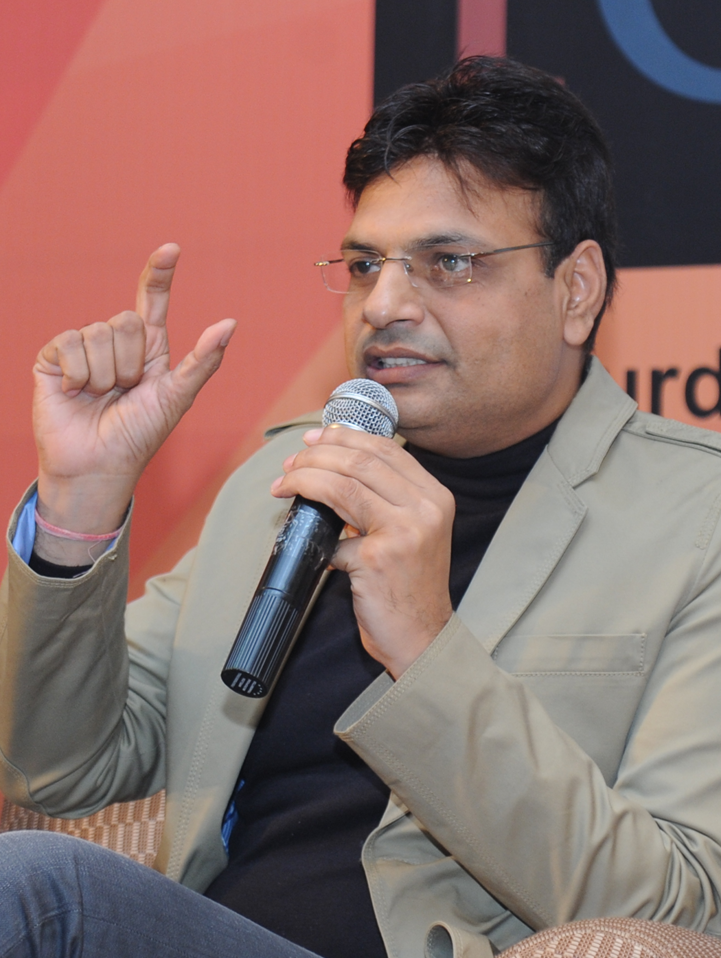
Irshad Kamil, Best Lyricist

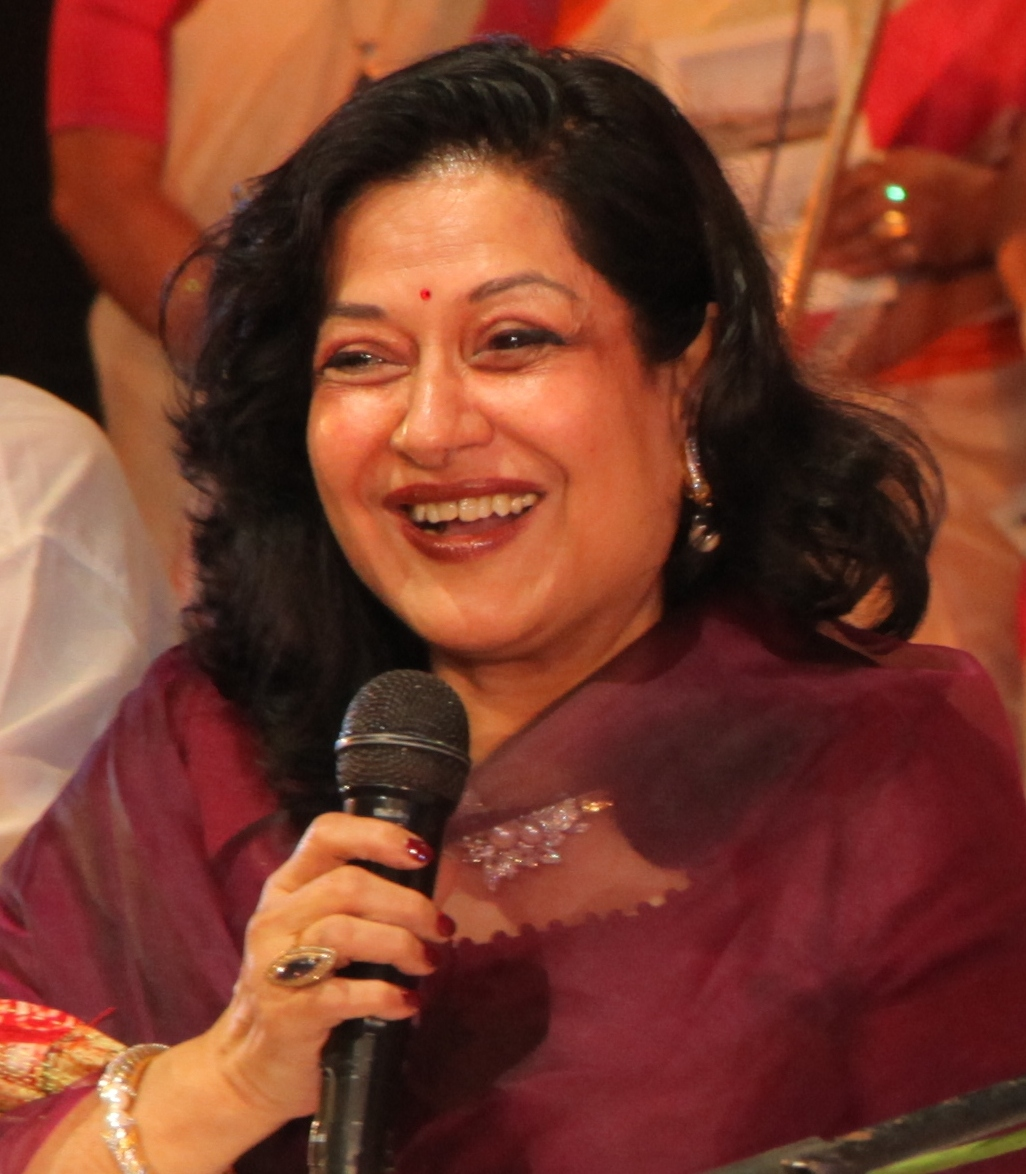
Moushumi Chatterjee, Lifetime Achievement Awardee

=== Main awards ===
Best Film	Best Director
Bajirao Mastani – Sanjay Leela Bhansali, Kishore Lulla; Badlapur – Dinesh Vijan, Sunil Lulla; Bajrangi Bhaijaan – Salman Khan, Rockline Venkatesh; Piku – N.P. Singh, Ronnie Lahiri, Sneha Rajani; Talvar – Vineet Jain, Vishal Bhardwaj; Tanu Weds Manu Returns – Krishika Lulla, Sunil Lulla	Sanjay Leela Bhansali – Bajirao Mastani; Aanand L. Rai – Tanu Weds Manu Returns; Kabir Khan – Bajrangi Bhaijaan; Meghna Gulzar – Talvar; Shoojit Sircar – Piku; Sriram Raghavan – Badlapur
Best Actor	Best Actress
Ranveer Singh – Bajirao Mastani as Bajirao I; Amitabh Bachchan – Piku as Bhashkor Banerjee; Ranbir Kapoor – Tamasha as Ved Vardhan Sahni; Salman Khan – Bajrangi Bhaijaan as Pawan Kumar "Bajrangi" Chaturvedi; Shahrukh Khan – Dilwale as Raj Randhir Bakshi / Kaali; Varun Dhawan – Badlapur as Raghav "Raghu" Pratap Singh	Deepika Padukone – Piku as Piku Banerjee; Anushka Sharma – NH10 as Meera; Deepika Padukone – Bajirao Mastani as Mastani; Kajol – Dilwale as Meera Malik; Kangana Ranaut – Tanu Weds Manu Returns as Tanuja Trivedi / Kusum Sangwan; Sonam Kapoor – Dolly Ki Doli as Dolly / Madhuri / Priya / Bhagyashree
Best Supporting Actor	Best Supporting Actress
Anil Kapoor – Dil Dhadakne Do as Kamal Mehra; Deepak Dobriyal – Tanu Weds Manu Returns as Pappi; Jimmy Shergill – Tanu Weds Manu Returns as Raja Awasthi; Nawazuddin Siddiqui – Badlapur as Liak Mohammed Tungrekar; Sanjay Mishra – Masaan as Vidyadhar Pathak	Priyanka Chopra – Bajirao Mastani as Kashibai; Anushka Sharma – Dil Dhadakne Do as Farah Ali; Huma Qureshi – Badlapur as Jhimli; Shefali Shah – Dil Dhadakne Do as Neelam Mehra; Tabu – Drishyam as Inspector General Meera Deshmukh; Tanvi Azmi – Bajirao Mastani as Radha Maa
Best Male Debut	Best Female Debut
Sooraj Pancholi – Hero as Sooraj Kaushik	Bhumi Pednekar – Dum Laga Ke Haisha as Sandhya Verma
Best Music Director	Best Lyricist
Amaal Mallik, Ankit Tiwari, Meet Bros Anjjan – Roy; A. R. Rahman – Tamasha; Anupam Roy – Piku; Pritam – Dilwale; Sanjay Leela Bhansali – Bajirao Mastani; Shankar–Ehsaan–Loy – Dil Dhadakne Do	Irshad Kamil – "Agar Tum Saath Ho" – Tamasha; Amitabh Bhattacharya – "Gerua" – Dilwale; Anvita Dutt Guptan – "Gulaabo" – Shaandaar; Gulzar – "Zinda" – Talvar; Kumaar – "Sooraj Dooba Hain" – Roy; Varun Grover – "Moh Moh Ke Dhaage" – Dum Laga Ke Haisha
Best Playback Singer – Male	Best Playback Singer – Female
Arijit Singh – "Sooraj Dooba Hain" – Roy; Ankit Tiwari – "Tu Hai Ki Nahi" – Roy; Arijit Singh – "Gerua" – Dilwale; Atif Aslam – "Jeena Jeena" – Badlapur; Papon – "Moh Moh Ke Dhage" – Dum Laga Ke Haisha; Vishal Dadlani – "Gulaabo" – Shaandaar	Shreya Ghoshal – "Deewani Mastani" – Bajirao Mastani; Alka Yagnik – "Agar Tum Saath Ho" – Tamasha; Anusha Mani – "Gulaabo" – Shaandaar; Monali Thakur – "Moh Moh Ke Dhange" – Dum Laga Ke Haisha; Palak Muchhal – "Prem Ratan Dhan Payo" – Prem Ratan Dhan Payo; Priya Saraiya – "Sun Saathiya" – ABCD 2

=== Critics' awards ===
Best Movie (Best Director)
Piku – Shoojit Sircar
Best Actor	Best Actress
Amitabh Bachchan – Piku as Bhashkor Banerjee	Kangana Ranaut – Tanu Weds Manu Returns as Tanuja Trivedi / Kusum Sangwan

=== Technical awards ===
Best Story	Best Screenplay
V. Vijayendra Prasad – Bajrangi Bhaijaan	Juhi Chaturvedi – Piku
Best Dialogue	Best Editing
Himanshu Sharma – Tanu Weds Manu Returns	A. Sreekar Prasad – Talvar
Best Choreography	Best Cinematography
Birju Maharaj for "Mohe Rang Do Laal" – Bajirao Mastani	Manu Anand – Dum Laga Ke Haisha
Best Production Design	Best Sound Design
Sujeet Sawant, Sriram Iyengar and Saloni Dhatrak – Bajirao Mastani	Shajith Koyeri – Talvar
Best Costume Design	Best Background Score
Anju Modi and Maxima Basu – Bajirao Mastani	Anupam Roy – Piku
Best Special Effects	Best Action
Prana Studios – Bombay Velvet	Sham Kaushal – Bajirao Mastani

=== Special awards ===
Lifetime Achievement Award
- Moushumi Chatterjee
RD Burman Award
- Armaan Malik
Best Debut Director
- Neeraj Ghaywan – Masaan

=== Multiple nominations ===
- Bajirao Mastani – 14
- Piku – 8
- Tanu Weds Manu Returns – 7
- Badlapur – 6
- Dil Dhadakne Do, Dilwale, Dum Laga Ke Haisha, Talvar – 5
- Bajrangi Bhaijaan, Roy, Tamasha – 4
- Shaandaar – 3

=== Multiple awards ===
- Bajirao Mastani – 9
- Piku – 5
- Dum Laga Ke Haisha, Roy, Talvar, Tanu Weds Manu Returns – 2

Telecast

The ceremony was telecasted on Sony Television on 7 February 2016 at 8 pm IST

The coverage was made available on www.sonyliv.com and Sony Liv mobile app from 8 February 2016 onwards.
