= Barobax =

Underground Iranian pop band

- Origin: Tehran, Iran
- Genres: Pop
- Years active: 2006 - 2016
- Label: Avang Music
- Members: Khashayar; Keivan; Hamid
- Website: barobax.com

Barobax are an underground Iranian pop band with all three members (Khashayar Haghgoo, Keivan Haghgoo and Hamid Farouzmand) living in Tehran. They have an international following thanks to the Internet and Iranian satellite stations based outside Iran. Additionally, record labels such as Avang Music and M4 Records have distributed their music internationally.

Their album "Wag" was released in 2007. Filmed on location in Paris Café featuring Gamno, Barobax released Soosan Khanoom on January 16, 2010 which "inspired" the song featured in the Bollywood movie Agent Vinod - Pyaar ki Pungi by music director Pritam Chakraborty. Barobax filed a complaint of copyright infringement, however it was later withdrawn and an apology issued to Pritam Chakraborty with the statement "We do not want to get into any further legal issue and so we are withdrawing the case as we know that Mr. Pritam's lawyer is an expert in copyright laws and there will be strong criminal action otherwise made out against us...", some have suggested they were intimidated into withdrawing their complaint particularly due to the apologies wording though the matter appears settled for now.

== Name ==
The name "Barobax" is a satirical reference to the pronunciation of the Persian bar-o-bach or bar-o-bacheha (بر و بچه‌ها, "guys" or "friends") by the wealthier uptown citizens of North Tehran. This was later shortened to barobach (بروبچ) by uptown residents of Tehran and spread to downtown. The band used the sarcastic imitation of slang pronunciation by downtown folks barobax.

== Songs ==
Some of the inspiration for the lyrics of their earlier songs came from the lyrics of old Iranian children's songs that the band heard from others, in addition to those lyrics that they created and those from other songs that they changed.

== See also ==
- Music of Iran
