= Agent Vinod (2012 film) =

2012 Indian film by Sriram Raghavan

- Theatrical release poster
- Directed by: Sriram Raghavan
- Written by: Sriram Raghavan; Arijit Biswas
- Produced by: Saif Ali Khan; Dinesh Vijan
- Starring: Saif Ali Khan; Kareena Kapoor
- Cinematography: C. K. Muraleedharan
- Edited by: Pooja Ladha Surti
- Music by: Songs: Pritam; Background Score: Daniel B. George
- Production companies: Eros International; Illuminati Films
- Release date: 23 March 2012
- Running time: 152 minutes
- Country: India
- Language: Hindi
- Budget: ₹60 crore (US$6.2 million)
- Box office: ₹73 crore (US$7.6 million)

Agent Vinod is a 2012 Indian Hindi-language spy action film written and directed by Sriram Raghavan and produced by Saif Ali Khan and Dinesh Vijan. The film revolves around terrorist conspiracy and stars Khan and Kareena Kapoor in the lead roles, while Ram Kapoor, Prem Chopra, Shahbaz Khan and Adil Hussain appear in prominent roles with Ravi Kishan in a cameo appearance.

The film released on 23 March 2012 and received mixed reviews from critics, who praised the visuals, acting performances, action sequences, songs, cinematography and production values, but criticised the screenplay and writing. The film underperformed at the box office.

== Plot ==
Somewhere in a Taliban camp in the Dasht-e-Madar desert, in Afghanistan, ISI official Col. Huzefa is interrogating a captured man presumed to be a RAW agent. The man gives details of RAW's operations in Afghanistan in exchange for money and safe passage across the border. In doing so, he betrays his colleague, Major Rajan, who has also infiltrated the camp. This is, however, revealed to be a ruse, as both overpower their captors and fight their way out of the camp. Along the way, they rescue a girl called Farah, who was being held hostage.

Later, the captured man who escaped with Rajan is revealed, in New Delhi, to be Agent Vinod, who is shown a video message recorded by Rajan from Russia mentioning '242' just moments before being shot dead and tasked by RAW chief Hassan Nawaz to find out what '242' is. Vinod travels to St. Petersburg to intercept criminal don Abu Nazer and is almost captured, but manages to escape killing Abu in the process and goes to Tangier, Morocco. He assumes the identity of Freddie Khambatta and meets the Russian mafia boss David Kazaan and his personal Pakistani doctor, Ruby Mendes. Vinod manages to convince Kazaan that he is indeed Freddie and hacks his phone. He gets closer to Ruby to find out what '242' is and finds out that her name is actually Iram Parveen Bilal, and she is a British-Pakistani working undercover for the ISI. He obtains an invitation card for a private auction and learns that many international businessmen, some of them terrorist groups, are converging at an antiques auction in Marrakesh to purchase '242'.

At the auction, Vinod learns that '242' is actually the detonator for a nuclear device, and runs into businessman and philanthropist Jagdishwar Metla, with whom he has a disturbing conversation. A bidding war ensues, and Kazaan manages to secure the detonator through his Russian girlfriend. Eventually, when ISI chief Col. Iftekhar Ahmed is later shot dead in Pakistan by Col. Huzefa moments after being informed of a few defectors, it turns out that a group of rogue ISI colonels, including Huzefa, is planning a nuclear attack on India. Back in Morocco, Kazaan locks the detonator with a password, and hands it over to the mysterious 'Colonel', who has arrived in Morocco. Iram finds out that Vinod is a RAW agent and both agree to work together to prevent the nuclear device from falling into the wrong hands. 'Colonel' captures Ruby and asks her to reveal the whereabouts of Vinod; he then blackmails Vinod's contact into deceitfully retrieving the detonator and later has him killed before Vinod, who realizes the betrayal, can question him at gunpoint. Shortly afterwards, he is attacked and admitted to a hospital. He clears his way out of the hospital to find Iram. 'Colonel', now having the detonator, reaches Riga, Latvia to acquire the bomb. He is joined by rogue mercenary Jimmy, who is to detonate the bomb.

'Colonel' enlists Iram to help his men transport the bomb out of Latvia and tries to kill her, but fails. Vinod and Iram join hands again and try to capture the 'Colonel' and the bomb and reach Karachi, where they bump into Farah as she gets them access inside a function attended by Col. Pasha, only for Vinod and Iram to be captured by Col. Huzefa and nevertheless manage to escape. Meanwhile, elsewhere, the house of an old man known only as 'Professor', who has links to 'Colonel', is infiltrated by the RAW team with Iram visiting in the name of 'Colonel'; despite 'Colonel' leaking her allegiances to him, when 'Professor' tries to kill Iram, he is neutralized by a team of special forces soldiers. Later, while putting two and two together through artifacts recovered from 'Professor' at his house, they learn of a plot to smuggle the nuclear device from Karachi into India, via the sea route, and learn that the target of the bomb is New Delhi. They make it to Delhi, where Jimmy has already reached, and try to locate the bomb, but fail when Jimmy sets off a grenade and Vinod loses him in the fracas. Iram runs into 'Colonel', disguised as a pilot, again when she bumps into Metla and is fatally shot, but points him out to Indian security forces, who spring into action when he holds Metla at gunpoint; Metla manages to free himself from 'Colonel', and in a shootout, his head is chopped to pieces by the helicopter blades. Eventually, Vinod successfully tracks down the bomb to a restaurant, strategically killing Jimmy, and takes it up in an NSG helicopter to detonate it as far away from the city as possible since nobody knows the password; he asks Hassan to connect him to Iram, who is being treated for her gunshot wounds. Iram realises the password to the detonator was set by Kazaan and asks Vinod to try the name of Kazaan's camel - "Zilleh". The bomb is successfully defused, though Iram succumbs to her gunshot wounds.

Vinod meets up with Hassan, who informs him of a flashdrive recovered from 'Colonel'; he later visits Metla, revealing to him that he knows Metla has had a hand in the conspiracy as its mastermind since he had struck a deal with 'Colonel' to earn the Zeus Group millions of dollars and orchestrated the nuclear attack for his own benefit; Metla, however, mocks him, claiming geopolitical affairs like these are too complex for "lowkey" officers like him to understand. Unbeknownst to Metla, Vinod is secretly recording the conversation through a wire, with the Lashkar-e-Taiba's London cell listening in since minutes before their meeting. Realizing that they have been manipulated into almost starting a war with India, with the Pakistani government cracking down on them, the cell sends a suicide bomber to assassinate Metla at a function in his honour, even as Vinod proclaims to Metla that he must die "like a hero". Metla is killed, but posthumously feted as a great philanthropist. Later, on a beach in Cape Town, the Russian woman who first acquired the nuclear device is seen sunbathing; she looks up to find Vinod smiling at her, indicating he has moved on to his next mission.

== Cast ==
- Saif Ali Khan as Agent Vinod
- Kareena Kapoor as ISI agent Iram Parveen Bilal / Dr. Ruby Mendes
- Adil Hussain as Colonel
- Ravi Kishan as Major Rajan Sinha(Cameo)
- Gulshan Grover as Tehmur Pasha(Cameo)
- Rajat Kapoor as Iftekhar Ahmed, Chief of ISI
- Prem Chopra as David Kazaan
- Ram Kapoor as Abu Sayed Nazer
- Zakir Hussain as Associate in Tangier
- Shahbaz Khan as Colonel Huzefa Nawaz
- Maryam Zakaria as Farah Faqesh
- B. P. Singh as Hasan Nawaz, Chief of RAW
- Dhritiman Chaterji as Sir Jagadishwar Metla
- Arif Zakaria as the suicide bomber
- Rio Kapadia as Alay Khan, Pakistan's High Commissioner to India
- Satish Sharma as Contact in Riga
- Raajan Modi as Jetty Connect
- Elena Kazan as Tatiana Renko
- Mohommed Ali Shah as Police Inspector
- Lalit Parimoo as Professor
- Malika Haydon as an item dancer in the song "Steal The Night (I'll Do the Talking Tonight)" and "Pungi" (special appearance)

== Production ==
According to Raghavan, Agent Vinod is not a remake of the 1977 action film of the same name. In an interview with Bollywood Hungama, he described it as "a realistic film ... full of action pieces, thrills and characters." On 30 May 2010, the director reported that the film's shoot had officially begun in Mumbai. Filming later continued in Morocco and Latvia.

A Pakistani film maker Iram Parveen Bilal, whom director Sriram Raghavan met at Indian Film Festival Los Angeles, in 2008 was the inspiration behind Kareena's character name. In the beginning of the film, Agent Vinod mentions the name of a mole working as a guard at the Taliban camp in Afghanistan as Mahendra Sandhu, which was a reference to the actor who portrayed Agent Vinod in the original 1977 film.

The film's release was accompanied by an Indiagames strategy mobile video game based on the film.

== Soundtrack ==
The film's soundtrack has been composed by Pritam Chakraborty.

The track "I'll Do the Talking Tonight" is a partial interpolation of the 1978 song "Rasputin", composed by German disco group Boney M. which in turn, was an uncredited interpolation from "Kâtibim", an Ottoman folk song. According to IBN live, "Raabta" is the "most beautiful song" of the film. The version of "Raabta" used in the film is the "Night in a Motel" version and is incorrectly listed as being sung by Hamsika Iyer when in fact it was sung by Aditi Singh Sharma. The song "Habibi Ya Nour El Ain" performed by Alabina and Ishtar was used in a scene in the background when Agent Vinod and Freddie Khambatta are seen walking out of Tangier Airport. However, the song and artist were not credited. The version of "Dil Mera Muft Ka" used in the film is not in the soundtrack. Also not included in the soundtrack was the song "Govind Bolo Gopal Bolo" but which, due to "popular demand", was later uploaded on YouTube by T-Series on 29 March 2012.

== Reception ==
=== Critical reception ===
Kaveree Bamzai of India Today gave the film a mixed review, saying, "If only Sriram Raghavan had not gone weak on his knees at the thought of love, Agent Vinod would have been a smarter, sharper, cooler film." Gaurav Malani of The Times of India called the film "above average" and said "The film is entertaining but not in entirety. Agent Vinod gets the nod though not whole-heartedly!" Blassey Chettiar of Daily News and Analysis rated the film 3 out of 5 stars, saying, "Director Sriram Raghavan (Ek Hasina Thi, Johnny Gaddar) delivers a neat package, a suave lead hero slogging it out in picture-perfect locations, packing punches here and there, zooming off on sexy bikes, sexier cars and finally a copter, all in a day's work." Kunal Guha of Yahoo! rated the film 1 out of 5 stars, saying, "Let's just say foreign locales, weapons to annihilate the world, designer suits and not-so-excruciating interrogations don't cumulatively justify Agent Vinod as a thrilling movie-watching experience." Raja Sen of Rediff gave the film 2.5 out of 5 stars and said, "As a film, Agent Vinod must be termed a disappointment, a slick and well-produced throwback to the spy thriller that feels both overlong and under-conceived.".

Anupama Chopra of Hindustan Times gave 2.5 out of 5 noted "The result is that Agent Vinod never becomes more than the sum of its parts and even though it picks up speed in the second half, it leaves you both exhausted and unsatisfied". Mrigank Dhaniwala of Koimoi gave the film 2 out of 5 stars as well, commenting, "Agent Vinod is a bold experiment gone wrong; certainly not something that entertains in its entirety ... (and) comes nowhere closer to the Bond or the Bourne series of Hollywood films." Zee News commented that, "Agent Vinod is a genuine attempt at entertaining in a sensible manner. But it somehow falls short of being declared as a brilliant piece of work. Watch it for its stylish presentation, it hasn't got anything else to offer." Khalid Mohammed of Deccan Chronicle rated the film 2 out of 5 stars, commenting, "Suggestion: if you do venture into this at best, average Agent Vinod, carry a huge thermos of coffee to stay awake." Rajeev Masand of CNN-IBN rating the film 2/5 feels "Agent Vinod with so many varied influences that it never finds its own distinct identity".

Richard Kuipers of Variety commented that "this big-budget exercise bears all the hallmarks of a franchise-in-waiting; with an injection of the elan the real Maibaum brought to the Bond series, such an enterprise could prove successful".

=== Box office ===
On its opening day, the film collected ₹94.1 million (US$980,000) at the box office. It showed less growth during the next two days ultimately grossing around ₹180 million (US$1.9 million) in its first weekend. Agent Vinod went on to earn a total of ₹368 million (US$3.8 million) during its first week and ₹546 million (equivalent to ₹1.1 billion or US$12 million in 2026) throughout its run.

== Controversies ==
Before release, Agent Vinod ran into trouble when Saif Ali Khan's brawl with businessman Iqbal Meer Sharma was touted as a publicity stunt for the film. However, Khan has strongly denied this characterization, and said, "I don't believe in garnering publicity in such a negative manner. Rather our posters and promos should create the right kind of buzz".

Khan was shown black flags while promoting the film in Bhopal, which was triggered due to changes brought into administration of the Pataudi family properties in the Middle East.

Iranian band Barobax later sued the film's music director Pritam one week before the release, claiming that he lifted the song "Pyaar Ki Pungi" from the former's song "Soosan Khanoom". However, two weeks after the film's release, the band publicly apologised to Pritam and stating both the songs were different, and withdrew its court-case.

A few days before release, the film was banned by the Central Board of Film Censors of Pakistan for containing various controversial references to the Pakistani spy agency Inter-Services Intelligence. The film made references to a section of ISI's involvement in jihadi groups and terror activities. To this, Khan responded, "This is a realistic kind of a thriller. We have shown that there are some negative elements in Pakistan towards India and their Censor have a problem showing that. We have shown a few most-wanted criminals, those that are harboured in Pakistan, which is a known fact. May be they have taken offence to that. But ultimately we want a RAW agent to win and baddies to lose. If they are uncomfortable with that then they should publicise the fact that they are banning Agent Vinod in Pakistan".

A week after its theatrical release, Agent Vinod again ran into trouble for plagiarism. Reports said that the film featured songs from older films, without acquiring prior permission from the producers. The songs involved were "Aasmaan Pe Hai Khuda" from Ramesh Saigal's Phir Subha Hogi (1958), "Meri Jaan Maine Kaha" from Ramesh Behl's The Train (1970) and "Rakamma" from Mani Ratnam's Thalapathi (1991). The owners of these songs were not credited in the film. Saif Ali Khan however paid for the rights later, and explained this to be a last-minute co-ordination problem.

== Awards and nominations ==
Award	Category	Recipients and nominees	Result	Ref.
5th Mirchi Music Awards	Programmer & Arranger of the Year	DJ Phukan & Hyacinth Dsouza – "Dil Mera Muft Ka"	Won	
5th Mirchi Music Awards	Song representing Sufi tradition	"Raabta"	Nominated	
14th IIFA Awards	IIFA Award for Best Male Playback Singer	Mika Singh for "Pyaar ki Pungi"	Nominated	
2013 Zee Cine Awards	Zee Cine Award for Best Track of the Year	"Pyaar ki Pungi"	Nominated	

== See also ==
- Bollywood films of 2012
