= GiMA Award for Best Background Score =

The GiMA Best Background Score is given by Global Indian Music Academy as a part of its annual Global Indian Music Academy Awards to recognise the best background music in a Hindi film.

== Superlatives ==
Superlative	Singer	Record
Most awards	Shankar–Ehsaan–Loy	2
Most nominations	Shankar–Ehsaan–Loy; A. R. Rahman	4
Most nominations without ever winning	Amit Trivedi; Clinton Cerejo	2
Most nominations in a single year	Sandeep Shirodkar (2011); Shankar–Ehsaan–Loy (2012)	2

== List of winners ==
- 2010 Shankar–Ehsaan–Loy – My Name Is Khan
- 2011 Sandeep Shirodkar – Dabangg
  - Vishal–Shekhar – Tees Maar Khan
  - Amit Trivedi – Udaan
  - Sandeep Shirodkar – Once Upon A Time In Mumbaai
  - Wayne Sharpe – Rajneeti
- 2012 A. R. Rahman – Rockstar
  - Clinton Cerejo – Kahaani
  - Ram Sampath – Delhi Belly
  - Shankar–Ehsaan–Loy, Tubby – Don 2
  - Shankar–Ehsaan–Loy, Tubby for – Zindagi Na Milegi Dobara
- 2013 – (no award given)
- 2014 Shankar–Ehsaan–Loy – Bhaag Milkha Bhaag
  - A. R. Rahman – Raanjhanaa
  - Raju Singh – Aashiqui 2
  - Monty Sharma, Tubby for – Goliyon Ki Raasleela Ram-Leela
  - Pritam – Yeh Jawaani Hai Deewani
- 2015 Vishal Bhardwaj – Haider
  - A. R. Rahman – Highway
  - Amit Trivedi – Queen
  - Clinton Cerejo – Dedh Ishqiya
  - Tubby–Parik – 2 States
- 2016 Sanchit Balhara – Bajirao Mastani
  - Sachin–Jigar – ABCD 2
  - Sachin–Jigar – Badlapur
  - Shankar–Ehsaan–Loy – Dil Dhadakne Do
  - Anupam Roy– Piku
  - A. R. Rahman- Tamasha

== See also ==
- Bollywood
- Cinema of India
