= Sriram Raghavan =

Indian filmmaker (born 1963)

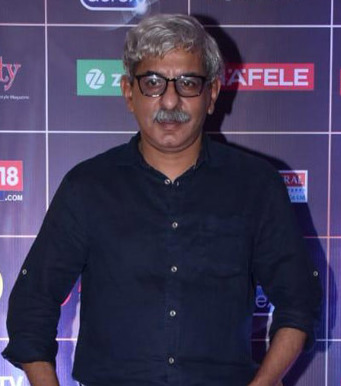
- Raghavan in 2019
- Born: 22 June 1963 (age 63); Bombay, Maharashtra, India
- Occupations: Film director; screenwriter
- Years active: 1987–present
- Relatives: Shridhar Raghavan (brother)

Sriram Raghavan (born 22 June 1963) is an Indian film director and screenwriter who works in Hindi cinema. He is primarily considered an auteur of neo-noir action thrillers.

Raghavan made his directorial debut with Ek Hasina Thi (2004). He then went on to direct the critically acclaimed Johnny Gaddaar (2007), an adaptation of the 1962 French novel Les mystifiés by Alain Reynaud-Fourton; followed by the action spy film Agent Vinod (2012) starring Saif Ali Khan; a critical and commercial failure. Raghavan's followup Badlapur (2015), a film based on Death's Dark Abyss by Massimo Carlotto met with positive reviews and was a moderate commercial success at the box office.

Raghavan's prominence increased with Andhadhun (2018) which tells the story of a blind piano player who unwittingly becomes embroiled in the murder of a retired actor. The film received critical acclaim and was commercially successful. He is the recipient of several accolades, including two National film Awards and two Filmfare Awards.

== Early life ==
Raghavan was born in Bombay (Mumbai), Maharashtra to a botanist father and a film-enthusiast mother. His parents are Tamil Hindus. He grew up in Pune, where he did his schooling at the St. Vincent's High School. He also studied economics at Fergusson College in Pune.

He is a graduate of Film and Television Institute of India (FTII), Pune. Rajkumar Hirani, one of his batch-mates, edited his diploma film, The Eight Column Affair, which went on win the National Film Award in 1987. He is the brother of Shridhar Raghavan, a writer known for the television series, C.I.D., and the 2019 action thriller, War.

== Career ==
Raghavan started his career before joining the FTII for Stardust, but left since he wasn't interested in it. Post his FTII studies, he made a documentary Raman Raghav, with Raghuvir Yadav. Later he worked as a writer for television soaps, writing many episodes of CID and Aahat, and also directed one episode of the Star Bestsellers called 'First Kill' Later, he met Ram Gopal Varma, who liked his work in Raman Raghav, and signed him up for the film Ek Hasina Thi, a dark thriller starring Saif Ali Khan and Urmila Matondkar. The film borrows elements from the novel If Tomorrow Comes as well films Double Jeopardy and The Bone Collector

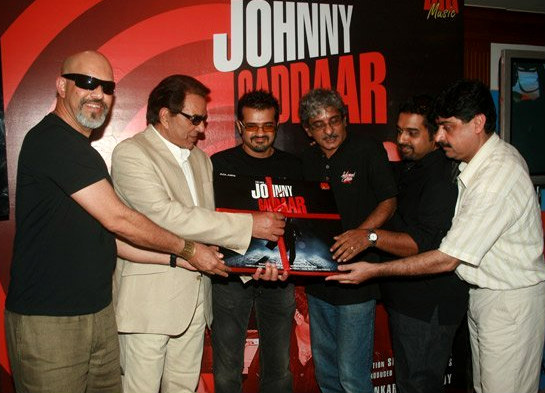
Raghavan along with composers Shankar–Ehsaan–Loy and actor Dharmendra at the music launch of Johnny Gaddaar

Raghavan later went on to direct another thriller, Johnny Gaddaar, which marked the debut of Neil Nitin Mukesh. The film was an uncredited adaptation of the 1962 French novel Les Mystifies by Alain Reynaud Fourton. The film was positively received by critics, though it didn't fare well at the box office; it has since been considered a cult classic. His third film was the spy thriller Agent Vinod which is not a remake of the 1977 action film of the same name Starring Saif Ali Khan as the titular character alongside Kareena Kapoor, it received mixed reviews from critics and failed at the box office.

Raghavan next directed and wrote the revenge thriller Badlapur starring Varun Dhawan, Nawazuddin Siddiqui, Huma Qureshi, Yami Gautam which was released on 20 February 2015. Based on the novel Death's Dark Abyss by Italian writer Massimo Carlotto, it received positive reviews from critics. Sudhish Kamath from The Hindu wrote "Sriram Raghavan's latest is a fantastic return to form and the kind of cinema he revels in making: character-driven narratives with funny, dark, explosive situations, a realistic exploration of filmy tropes." The film won six Filmfare Awards including Best Film and Best Director. It was a moderate box office success, grossing over ₹81.3 crore (US$8.4 million) worldwide.

Raghavan's next venture was the black comedy crime thriller Andhadhun, starring Ayushmann Khurana, Tabu, and Radhika Apte, which released on 5 October 2018 to critical acclaim. Raghavan saw L'Accordeur (The Piano Tuner), a 2010 French short film about a blind pianist, in 2013 at the recommendation of his friend, filmmaker Hemanth M Rao and was inspired by it. In a positive review of the film, Sushant Mehta of India Today wrote, "Raghavan's ability to shock an entire cinema hall including the most immovable, emotionless fan coupled with his ability to make the audience laugh during these moments where your heart is in your mouth defines his unique brand of cinema". The film earned ₹4.56 billion (US$47 million) worldwide, a majority of which came from the Chinese box office, to become his highest-grossing release and one of Indian cinema's biggest grossers.

His next film Merry Christmas was based on the French novel Le Monte-charge (Bird in a Cage).

== Filmography ==
Year	Film	Notes
1987	The Eight Column Affair	Student film
1991	Raman Raghav: A City, A Killer	Documentary about serial killer Raman Raghav
2004	Ek Hasina Thi	Incorporates plot elements from Sidney Sheldon’s novel If Tomorrow Comes
2007	Johnny Gaddaar	Adaptation of the 1962 French novel Les Mystifies by Alain Reynaud Fourton
2012	Agent Vinod	Partly inspired by the 1977 Hindi film Agent Vinod
2015	Badlapur	Based on the Italian novel Death’s Dark Abyss by Massimo Carlotto
2018	Andhadhun	Inspired by the French short film The Piano Tuner (2010) by Olivier Treiner
2024	Merry Christmas	Simultaneously shot in Tamil; Tamil debut; adapted from the French crime novel Bird in a Cage by Frédéric Dard
2026	Ikkis	Biographical drama based on the life of Param Vir Chakra awardee Arun Khetarpal, a hero of the Indo–Pakistani War of 1971

== Awards and nominations ==
Film	Award	Category	Result	Ref.
Johnny Gaddaar	53rd Filmfare Awards	Best Screenplay	Nominated	
Badlapur	61st Filmfare Awards	Best Film	Nominated	
Badlapur	61st Filmfare Awards	Best Director	Nominated	
Andhadhun	66th National Film Awards	Best Adapted Screenplay	Won	
Andhadhun	66th National Film Awards	Best Feature Film in Hindi	Won	
Andhadhun	64th Filmfare Awards	Best Film	Nominated	
Andhadhun	64th Filmfare Awards	Best Director	Nominated	
Andhadhun	64th Filmfare Awards	Critics Best Film	Won	
Andhadhun	64th Filmfare Awards	Best Screenplay	Won	
Andhadhun	24th Star Screen Awards	Best Director	Won	
Andhadhun	24th Star Screen Awards	Best Screenplay	Won	
Andhadhun	Zee Cine Awards	Best Film Writing	Won	
Andhadhun	20th IIFA Awards	Best Film	Nominated	
Andhadhun	20th IIFA Awards	Best Director	Won	
Andhadhun	20th IIFA Awards	Best Story	Won	
Andhadhun	20th IIFA Awards	Best Screenplay	Won	
Andhadhun	2019 Bandung Film Festival	Honorable Imported Films	Won	
Andhadhun	Asian Summer Film Festival (Festival Nits de cinema oriental de Vic)	Best Movie	Won	
Andhadhun	Asian Summer Film Festival (Festival Nits de cinema oriental de Vic)	Special Jury Prize	Won	
Andhadhun	1st Diorama International Film Festival & Market	Golden Sparrow for Best Indian Feature Film	Won	
