= GiMA Award for Best Engineer – Film Album =

The GiMA Best Engineer – Film Album is given by Global Indian Music Academy as a part of its annual Global Indian Music Academy Awards to recognise a music engineer who has delivered an outstanding performance in a film.

== Superlatives ==
Superlative	Singer	Record
Most awards	Eric Pillai	4
Most nominations	Eric Pillai	14
Most nominations without ever winning	Vijay Dayal	3
Most nominations in a single year	Eric Pillai (2011)	4

== List of winners ==
- 2010 Eric Pillai – Love Aaj Kal
- 2011 Eric Pillai – Dabangg
  - Eric Pillai - I Hate Luv Storys
  - Eric Pillai - Once Upon A Time In Mumbaai
  - Eric Pillai, Pramod Chandorkar, Shaitus Joseph - Raajneeti
  - Vijay Dayal - Band Baaja Baaraat
- 2012 Hentry Kuruvilla, P. A. Deepak, S.Sivakumar, T.R. Krishna Chetan – Rockstar
  - Dipesh Sharma, Vijay Dayal - Agneepath
  - Abhijit Vaghani, Eric Pillai, Mark 'Exit' Goodchild, Vijay Dayal, Warren Mendonsa - Ra.One
  - Vijay Benegal - Don 2
  - Vijay Benegal - Zindagi Na Milegi Dobara
- 2013 – (no award given)
- 2014 Eric Pillai – Aashiqui 2
  - Eric Pillai, Shadab Rayeen - Yeh Jawaani Hai Deewani
  - R Nitish Kumar - Raanjhanaa
  - Tanay Gajjar - Goliyon Ki Raasleela Ram-Leela
- 2015 Eric Pillai – Ek Villain
  - Eric Pillai – CityLights
  - Eric Pillai – Dedh Ishqiya
  - R Nitish Kumar, TR Krishna Chetan – Highway
  - Tanay Gajjar – 2 States
- 2016 Tanay Gajjar – Bajirao Mastani
  - Eric Pillai – ABCD 2
  - Eric Pillai – Badlapur
  - Eric Pillai, Shadab Rayeem – Dilwale
  - Tanay Gajjar – Dil Dhadakne Do

== See also ==
- Bollywood
- Cinema of India
