= List of awards and nominations received by Varun Dhawan =

Varun Dhawan awards and nominations
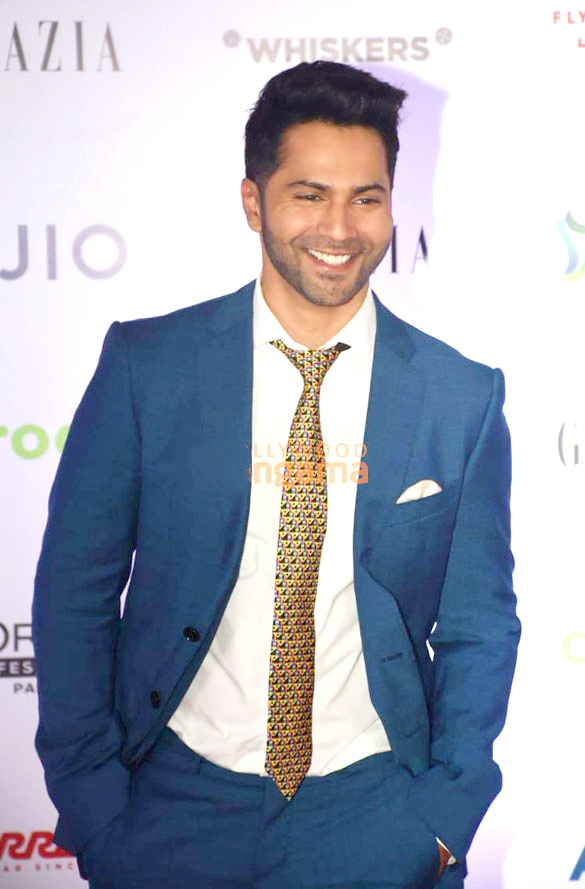
- Dhawan at Grazia Fashion Awards in 2022
Awards and nominations
Award	Wins	Nominations
BIG Star Entertainment Awards	2	4
Filmfare Awards	0	5
Screen Awards	2	5
Zee Cine Awards	2	5
Stardust Awards	2	2
Star Guild Awards	1	3
IIFA Awards	2	1
Jagran Film Festival	1	0
Indian Film Festival of Melbourne	0	1
Indian Television Academy Awards	1	0
Nickelodeon Kids' Choice Awards India	7	9
Lions Gold Awards	3	0
Others	17	19

Totals (Note: Certain award groups do not simply award one winner. They acknowledge several different recipients, have runners-up, and have third place. Since this is a specific recognition and is different from losing an award, runner-up mentions are considered wins in this award tally. For simplification and to avoid errors, each award in this list has been presumed to have had a prior nomination.)
- Wins: 40
- Nominations: 54

Varun Dhawan is an Indian actor who works predominantly in Hindi Cinema. Dhawan is the recipient of 38 awards into his credit. He has received nominations for the Filmfare Award for Best Actor for his intriguing performances in Badlapur (2015) and Badrinath Ki Dulhania (2017), and earned the International Indian Film Academy Awards for Best Performance in a Comic Role for Humpty Sharma Ki Dulhania and Main Tera Hero.

He further received a nomination for the Filmfare Critics Award for Best Actor for his performance in October (2018) and in Bhediya (2022) and won the Zee Cine Awards for Performer of the Year – Male for the former. Dhawan got acknowledged with the Indian Television Academy Awards for Best Actor of the Decade for completing 10 years in the Hindi Film Industry respectively.

== Awards and nominations ==
=== Film awards and nominations ===
Year	Film	Award	Category	Result	Ref.
2013	Student of the Year	BIG Star Entertainment Awards	Most Entertaining Actor (Film) Debut - Male	Nominated	
2013	Student of the Year	Filmfare Awards	Best Male Debut	Nominated	
2013	Student of the Year	Screen Awards	Most Promising Newcomer – Male	Nominated	
2013	Student of the Year	Zee Cine Awards	Best Male Debut	Nominated	
2013	Student of the Year	Star Guild Awards	Best Male Debut	Nominated	
2013	Student of the Year	Stardust Awards	Breakthrough Performance – Male	Won	
2013	Student of the Year	Stardust Awards	Superstar of Tomorrow – Male	Nominated	
2015	Humpty Sharma Ki Dulhania	Stardust Awards	Best Actor – Comedy/Romance	Won	
2015	Humpty Sharma Ki Dulhania	Stardust Awards	Superstar of Tomorrow – Male (also for Main Tera Hero)	Nominated	
2015	Humpty Sharma Ki Dulhania	Screen Awards	Best Actor	Nominated	
2015	Humpty Sharma Ki Dulhania	Star Guild Awards	Best Actor in a Leading Role	Nominated	
2015	Humpty Sharma Ki Dulhania	BIG Star Entertainment Awards	Most Entertaining Actor in a Romantic Film – Male	Nominated	
2015	Main Tera Hero	BIG Star Entertainment Awards	Most Entertaining Actor in a Comedy Film – Male	Nominated	
2015	Main Tera Hero	BIG Star Entertainment Awards	Most Entertaining Actor – Male	Nominated	
2015	Main Tera Hero	Star Guild Awards	Best Actor in a Comic Role	Won	
2015	Main Tera Hero	Screen Awards	Best Actor (Popular Choice)	Nominated	
2015	Main Tera Hero	International Indian Film Academy Awards	Best Performance in a Comic Role	Won	
2016	Badlapur	Filmfare Awards	Best Actor	Nominated	
2016	Badlapur	BIG Star Entertainment Awards	Most Entertaining Actor in a Thriller Film – Male	Won	
2016	Badlapur	BIG Star Entertainment Awards	Most Entertaining Actor in an Action Film – Male	Won	
2016	Badlapur	Times of India Film Awards	Best Actor (Popular)	Nominated	
2016	Badlapur	Times of India Film Awards	Best Actor (Critics)	Nominated	
2016	ABCD 2	Star Guild Awards	Best Actor in a Leading Role	Nominated	
2016	Dilwale & Dishoom	Nickelodeon Kids' Choice Awards India	Best Entertainer of the Year	Won	
2016	Humpty Sharma Ki Dulhania	Nickelodeon Kids' Choice Awards India	Best Jodi with (Alia Bhatt)	Won	
2017	Badrinath Ki Dulhania	Nickelodeon Kids' Choice Awards India	Favorite Dancing Star	Won	
2017	Badrinath Ki Dulhania	Nickelodeon Kids' Choice Awards India	Best Entertainer (Film)	Won	
2017	Badrinath Ki Dulhania	Zee Cine Awards	Best Actor Male	Won	
2017	Dishoom	Zee Cine Awards	Best Actor in a Comic Role	Nominated	
2017	Dishoom	International Indian Film Academy Awards	Best Comedian	Won	
2017	Dishoom	Star Screen Awards	Best Comedian	Won	
2018	Badrinath Ki Dulhania	Star Screen Awards	Best Comedian	Won	
2018	Badrinath Ki Dulhania	Star Screen Awards	Best Actor – Male (Popular)	Nominated	
2018	Badrinath Ki Dulhania	Filmfare Awards	Best Actor	Nominated	
2018	Badrinath Ki Dulhania	Zee Cine Awards	Best Actor (Jury's Choice) – Male	Won	
2018	Judwaa 2	Zee Cine Awards	Best Actor (Viewer's Choice) – Male	Nominated	
2018	Judwaa 2	Star Screen Awards	Best Actor in a Comic Role	Nominated	
2018	October	Nickelodeon Kids' Choice Awards India	Favourite Movie Actor	Won	
2018	October	Indian Film Festival of Melbourne	Best Actor	Nominated	
2018	October	Jagran Film Festival	Best Actor - Male	Won	
2019	October	Filmfare Awards	Best Actor (Critics)	Nominated	
2019	Sui Dhaaga	Zee Cine Awards	Best Actor (Viewer's Choice) - Male	Nominated	
2019	Kalank	Nickelodeon Kids' Choice Awards India	Favourite Actor (Male)	Nominated	
2023	Jugjugg Jeeyo	Zee Cine Awards	Performer of the Year (Male)	Won	
2023	Bhediya	Zee Cine Awards	Performer of the Year (Male)	Won	
2023	Bhediya	Filmfare Awards	Best Actor (Critics)	Nominated	
2023	Bawaal	Filmfare OTT Awards	Best Actor (Web Original Film)	Nominated	
2024	Bawaal	Pinkvilla Screen and Style Icons Awards	Best Actor (OTT) – Popular Choice	Won	

=== Other awards and recognition ===
Year	Award / Organisation	Category	Result	Ref.
2019	Nickelodeon Kids' Choice Awards India	Favourite Dancing Star	Nominated	
2021	Nickelodeon Kids' Choice Awards India	Favourite Actor	Won	
2022	Indian Television Academy Awards	Best Actor of the Decade	Won	
2022	Pinkvilla Style Icons Awards	Super Stylish Inspirational Youth Idol - Male	Won	
2023	Bollywood Hungama Style Icons	Most Stylish Actor (Male)	Nominated	
2023	Bollywood Hungama Style Icons	Most Stylish Leading Star (Male)	Nominated	
2023	Bollywood Hungama Style Icons	Most Stylish Youth Icon (Male)	Nominated	
2023	Bollywood Hungama OTT Fest	Best Actor Male (Popular)	Won	
