= Stardust Award for Best Actor in a Comedy or Romance =

Film award in India

The Stardust Best Comedy/Romance Actor is chosen by the readers of the annual Indian Stardust magazine. It was started in 1971 by Nari Hira. The Stardust Award honours a star that has made an impact with their acting in that certain Hindi film.

Here is a list of the award winners and the films for which they won.

Year	Actor	Film
2011	Akshay Kumar	Housefull
2012	Akshay Kumar	Desi Boyz
2013	Abhishek Bachchan	Bol Bachchan
2014	no award	no award
2015	Varun Dhawan	Humpty Sharma Ki Dulhania
2018	Varun Dhawan	Judwaa 2
