= Ileana D'Cruz =

Indian-born Portuguese actress (born 1986)

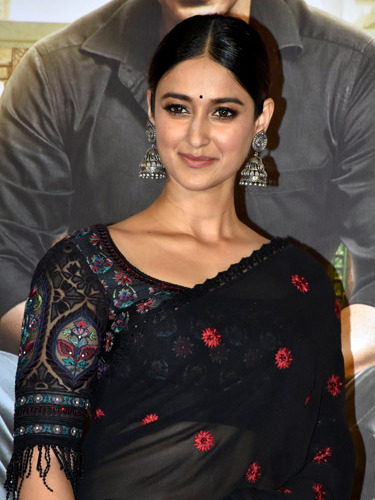
- D'Cruz in 2018
- Born: 1 November 1986 (age 40); Mumbai, Maharashtra, India
- Citizenship: India (until 2014); Portugal (from 2014)
- Occupation: Actress
- Years active: 2006–2024
- Spouse: Michael Dolan (m. 2023)
- Children: 2
- Awards: Full list

Ileana D'Cruz (born 1 November 1986) is an Indian-born Portuguese actress who primarily appears in Hindi and Telugu films. She is the recipient of several accolades including a Filmfare Award and a Filmfare Awards South.

D'Cruz made her screen debut in 2006 with the Telugu-language romantic-drama film Devadasu, a commercial success, which won her the Filmfare Award for Best Female Debut - South. D'Cruz established herself as a leading actress in Telugu cinema with successful films including Pokiri (2006), Jalsa (2008), Kick (2009), and Julayi (2012). She also starred in the Tamil film Nanban (2012), which was a commercial success. D'Cruz expanded to Hindi cinema in 2012 with Anurag Basu's comedy-drama Barfi!, for which she won the Filmfare Award for Best Female Debut. She then played the leading lady in the box office successes—romantic comedy Main Tera Hero (2014), and the crime thrillers Rustom (2016) and Raid (2018).

In addition to her acting career, D'Cruz is a prominent celebrity endorser for brands and products. D'Cruz is married to Michael Dolan, with whom she has two sons.

== Early life ==
Ileana D'Cruz was born to a Goan Catholic father and Muslim mother in Mahim, Bombay (now Mumbai) on 1 November 1986. She is an atheist. Her family moved to Parra, Goa when she was 10 years old.

Her first modeling portfolio was created in January 2003, and D'Cruz called it a "disaster". Subsequent photo shoots and ramp shows led to a second portfolio the following year, which landed her advertisements from Electrolux, Emami Talc and Fair & Lovely. The latter, in particular, which was directed by Rakesh Roshan, gave her exposure and brought in several offers for acting in feature films.

== Career ==
=== Breakthrough (2006–2007) ===
In 2005, D'Cruz was called for an audition by director Teja, but the project was cancelled. She made her feature film debut the following year with the Telugu romance film Devadasu, playing an NRI girl opposite Ram Pothineni. She underwent acting classes with Aruna Bhikshu, before starting to work on the film, and recalls that during filming she felt "pressured ... almost cried and didn't want to go further", but went ahead after her mother encouraged her, giving her "the lecture of a lifetime [...] at 3 am." A critic from Indiaglitz stated that she "has chiseled features and a figure to die-for." The film became the year's first commercially successful Telugu film, eventually grossing around ₹140 million, whilst earning D'Cruz the Filmfare Award for Best Female Debut – South. D'Cruz next played an aerobics teacher, who is harassed by a corrupt police officer opposite Mahesh Babu, in Pokiri. The film was a major commercial success, emerging as the highest-grossing Telugu film at the time. The film proved to be her breakthrough, with Trade analyst Sridhar Pillai calling her the "new pin-up girl of Telugu cinema". Sify found her to be "promising". The film earned her nomination for Filmfare Award for Best Actress – Telugu.

In her third release of 2006, she made her Tamil film debut with Kedi opposite Ravi Krishna and appeared opposite Ravi Teja in Khatarnak, both of which were box office failures. Her final release of the year, Rakhi opposite Jr. NTR was a box office success. D'Cruz first release of 2007, Munna opposite Prabhas was an average grosser. She then played a college student who is on the run from the home minister's crooked son, in Aata opposite Siddharth. It was a box office failure. Radhika Rajmani however stated, "Ileana is true to her character and her earnest performances is perhaps the saving grace of the film."

=== Critical and commercial success in Telugu films (2008–2011) ===
D'Cruz played a college student in love with her sister's ex-lover in the 2008 film Jalsa, opposite Pawan Kalyan. The film was a box office success and one of the year's highest grosser. She received largely positive remarks, with critics citing that she looked "pretty", and "damn cool". Her performance won her the Santosham Award for Best Actress alongside her second Filmfare Best Actress – Telugu nomination. Her second release that year Bhale Dongalu opposite Tarun received mixed reviews from critics and audience.

D'Cruz had three film releases in 2009. In her first film Kick, she reunited with Ravi Teja, played a modern girl. It was a commercial success, becoming one of the highest-grossing films of the year. A critic stated: "Ileana plays her part well. She is still as sexy as ever and the director exploits her charm and sex appeal to the hilt." The film earned her third Filmfare Best Actress – Telugu nomination. Her other two releases that year: Rechipo opposite Nithiin and Saleem opposite Vishnu Manchu, performed poorly at the box office.

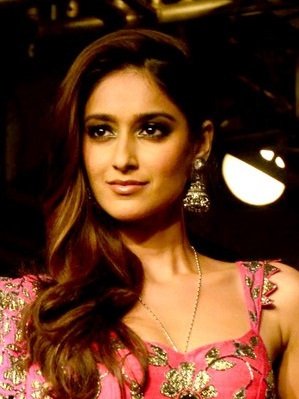
D'Cruz at an event

In 2010, D'Cruz had a special appearance in the Kannada film Huduga Hudugi. D'Cruz appeared in two films in 2011. Her first film that year was Shakthi, opposite Jr. NTR, where she played a minister's daughter. The socio-fantasy film was the costliest Telugu film ever made at ₹ 250,000,000. It became a box office failure. A Rediff.com critic criticised her performance. Her next release Nenu Naa Rakshasi, saw her play a YouTuber and vlogger opposite Rana Daggubati. Though the film was a failure, her performance was received positively by critics; an India Glitz reviewer described her as a "pleasant surprise in the film" as she "cried, smirked, looked hot, grabbed sympathy and made faces that were apt to the scenes", Despite these failures, D'Cruz continued to be among the highest-paid actresses in South Indian cinema.

=== Expansion to Hindi films and recognition (2012–2018) ===
D'Cruz appeared in four films in 2012. She first returned to Tamil films after six years with Nanban opposite Vijay, where she played a doctor. A remake of the 2009 Hindi film 3 Idiots, it became a major financial success, grossing ₹400 million (US$4.3 million) at the box office on its first week. She received Vijay Award for Favourite Heroine nomination for the film. In her next film Julayi, she played a travel agent's assistant opposite Allu Arjun. A box office success, it became one of the highest grossing Telugu film of the year. A CNN-IBN reviewer took note of her different characterization. She then played a taxi driver in Devudu Chesina Manushulu, opposite Ravi Teja. The film received mixed reviews and eventually under-performed at the box office.

In her final release of the year, D'Cruz expanded to Hindi films with Anurag Basu's Barfi!. She portrayed Shruti, a girl who leaves her true love for material comforts and the narrator, opposite Ranbir Kapoor. The film was a major commercial success, earning ₹1.75 billion (US$19 million) worldwide, becoming one of the highest-grossing film of the year. D'Cruz's performance earned her the Filmfare Award for Best Female Debut, as well as several nominations for Best Supporting Actress. Rachit Gupta noted, "This is Ileana's first film but her fantastic performance is just a testament why the Telugu audience consider her a superstar. Of course it also helps that she is the most visually appealing in Barfi!, out shining even the scenic hills of Darjeeling." Rajeev Masand stated, "Ileana leaves a lasting impression in her Hindi film debut, conveying both love and pain through those beautiful, expressive eyes." The film was chosen as India's official entry to the Oscars for the 85th Academy Awards.

In her only film of 2013, Phata Poster Nikhla Hero, she played a social worker opposite Shahid Kapoor. The film was eventually declared a poor grosser at the box office. A Times of India critic stated that she was "good with emotions but not so tuned into comedy yet." D'Cruz first release of 2014 was Main Tera Hero, a remake of the Telugu film Kandireega. She played a college student opposite Varun Dhawan. The film became a box office success. Taran Adarsh noted, "Ileana pairs off well with Varun and does a reasonable job." She then played a romance novelist opposite Saif Ali Khan in Happy Ending. The film underperformed at the box office.

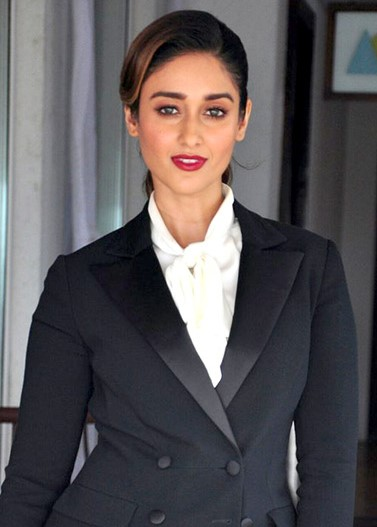
D'Cruz at an event for Baadshaho, in 2017

Following a year hiatus, D'Cruz appeared opposite Akshay Kumar in the 2016 film Rustom. The film emerged as the fourth highest-grossing Hindi film of the year, collecting more than 2 billion at the box office. D'Cruz played Cynthia Pavri, a character based on Sylvia Nanavati. Anna MM Vetticad noted, "Illeana D’Cruz looks stunning in the film and does a decent job, but her characterisation is troubling." In 2017, D'Cruz first played a talkative Punjabi girl in Mubarakan, opposite Arjun Kapoor. The film was a moderate success at the box office. Saibal Chatterjee noted, "Mubarakan gives Ileana far more space than other actresses and she makes the most of the opportunity." In the next film, Baadshaho, she played a Rajasthani princess (a character based on Gayatri Devi), opposite Ajay Devgn. Kriti Tulsiani found her performance to be "superficial and unconvincing". It was a box office failure.

D'Cruz's first release of 2018 Raid, saw her play an income tax officer's wife opposite Ajay Devgn. The film was a major commercial success. Taran Adarsh stated that D'Cruz provides "depth" to her character. With her next release, D'Cruz returned to Telugu films after six years. She reunited with Ravi Teja in Amar Akbar Anthony. She played a dissociative identity disorder patient. Despite good expectations, the film failed at the box office. Hemanth Kumar CR found her to be "convincing".

=== Career fluctuations (2019–2024) ===
In 2019, D'Cruz played a con woman in Pagalpanti, opposite John Abraham. Priyanka Sinha Jha of News18 stated, "Ileana looks beautiful but has precious little to do." The film failed at the box office. With no release in 2020, she played a journalist in the 2021 The Big Bull alongside Abhishek Bachchan. Ronak Kotecha was appreciative of her "honest performance".

Following a three-year sabbatical, D'Cruz returned to films in 2024. She first played a dark-skin girl in Unfair & Lovely, opposite Randeep Hooda. Dhaval Roy stated, "Ileana shines as the endearing yet no-nonsense Lovely. But her makeup looks patchy and inconsistent throughout." In the same year, she played an emerging actress opposite Pratik Gandhi in Do Aur Do Pyaar. Anuj Kumar of The Hindu found her to be an "absolute delight". Both films underperformed at the box office.

== Other work and public image ==
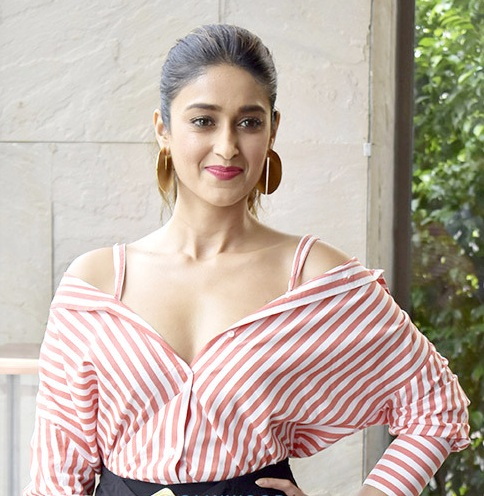
D'Cruz in 2017

D'Cruz has established herself as one of the leading actor of the Telugu and Hindi cinema. Vogue said that she is a "well-recognised name" in the South Indian film industry. Taran Adarsh termed her "super efficient". Verve noted, "D'Cruz makes the unreal seem believable on celluloid". She stood at the 18th place on Forbes India's most influential stars on Instagram in South cinema for the year 2021. She was widely praised for her Hindi film debut Barfi!. She was placed 2nd in Times of India's 10 Most Promising Female Newcomers of 2012 list. In 2012, Rediff.com placed her in their listing of the top 10 Bollywood actresses, where she ranked 8th. D'Cruz has been suffering from body dysmorphic disorder. She has been vocal about her body image issues.

In addition to her acting career, D'Cruz is a prominent celebrity endorser for brands and products including Clear Shampoo with Virat Kohli and CavinKare with Akshay Kumar. She is also the brand ambassador of Tourism Fiji. D'Cruz has subsequently appeared on Times' Most Desirable Women list, she was placed 20th in 2011 and 21st in 2013. D'Cruz has been associated with a number of causes. She has donated her clothes and accessories to raise money for renovating an animal hospital in Mumbai in 2013. She has walked the ramp for "Smile Foundation", to lend her support for girls education. In 2016, D'Cruz attended a charity event for the underprivileged kids.

== Personal life ==
D'Cruz acquired Portuguese nationality in 2014. In an interview with Verve in 2017, she claimed that Portugal was a part of her ancestry. She was in a relationship with Australian photographer Andrew Kneebone, which ended in 2019.

On May 13, 2023, D'Cruz married Michael Dolan. Their first child, a son, was born on August 1, 2023, and their second son on June 19, 2025.

== Filmography ==
=== Films ===
Key
†	Denotes films that have not yet been released

Year	Title	Role(s)	Language(s)	Notes	Ref.
2006	Devadasu	Bhanu	Telugu		
2006	Pokiri	Shruti	Telugu		
2006	Kedi	Aarthi	Tamil		
2006	Khatarnak	Nakshatra	Telugu		
2006	Rakhi	Tripura	Telugu		
2007	Munna	Nidhi	Telugu		
2007	Aata	Sathya	Telugu		
2008	Jalsa	Bhagyamathi "Bhagi"	Telugu		
2008	Bhale Dongalu	Jyothi	Telugu		
2009	Kick	Naina	Telugu		
2009	Rechipo	Krishna Veni	Telugu		
2009	Saleem	Satyavathi	Telugu		
2010	Huduga Hudugi	Herself	Kannada	Special appearance in the song "Ileana"	
2011	Shakti	Aishwarya	Telugu		
2011	Nenu Naa Rakshasi	Meenakshi / Shravya (Note: D'Cruz played a single character with two or more names)	Telugu		
2012	Nanban	Ria Santhanam	Tamil		
2012	Julayi	Madhu	Telugu		
2012	Devudu Chesina Manushulu	Ileana	Telugu		
2012	Barfi!	Shruti Ghosh Sengupta	Hindi		
2013	Phata Poster Nikhla Hero	Kajal Sharma	Hindi		
2014	Main Tera Hero	Sunaina Goradia	Hindi		
2014	Happy Ending	Aanchal Reddy	Hindi		
2016	Rustom	Cynthia Pavri	Hindi	Character based on Sylvia Nanavati.	
2017	Mubarakan	Supreet "Sweety" Gill	Hindi		
2017	Baadshaho	Rani Gitanjali Devi	Hindi	Character based on Gayatri Devi	
2018	Raid	Malini Patnaik	Hindi		
2018	Amar Akbar Anthony	Aishwarya / Pooja / Teresa	Telugu		
2019	Pagalpanti	Sanjana Paul	Hindi		
2021	The Big Bull	Meera Rao	Hindi		
2024	Tera Kya Hoga Lovely	Lovely Singh	Hindi		
2024	Do Aur Do Pyaar	Nora Kaushal	Hindi		

== Accolades ==
D'Cruz has received a Filmfare Award and a Filmfare Awards South each. She won the Filmfare Award for Best Female Debut—South for Devadasu and Filmfare Award for Best Female Debut for Barfi!.
