= List of awards and nominations received by Ileana D'Cruz =

Ileana D' Cruz awards and nominations
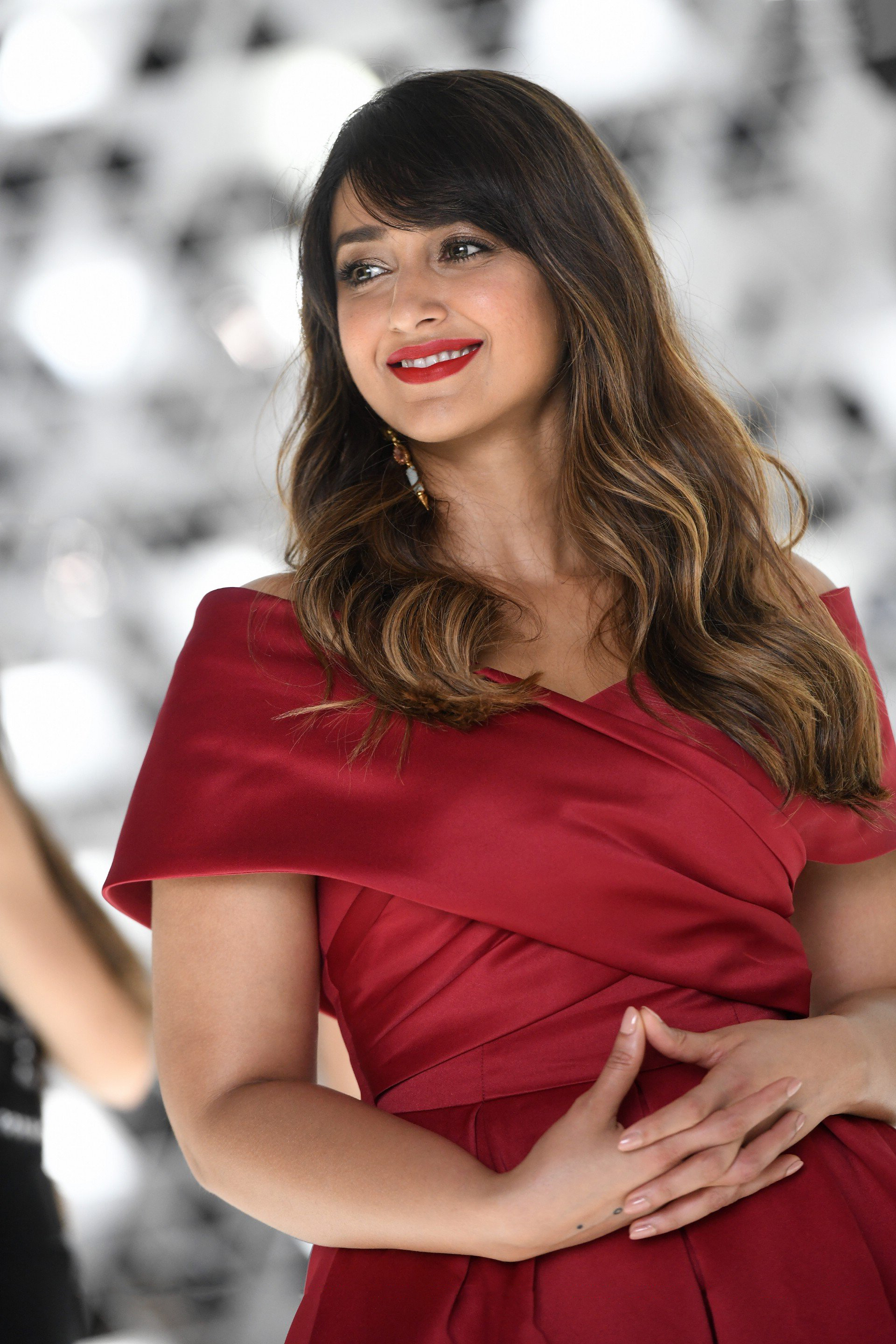
- D'Cruz in 2021
Awards and nominations
Award	Wins	Nominations
Filmfare Awards	1	2
Filmfare Awards South	1	5
Zee Cine Awards	1	1
Screen Awards	1	4
Star Guild Awards	1	3
Vijay Awards	0	1
Stardust Awards	0	4
Santosham Film Awards	1	1
Others	4	4

Totals (Note: Certain award groups do not simply award one winner. They acknowledge several different recipients, have runners-up, and have third place. Since this is a specific recognition and is different from losing an award, runner-up mentions are considered wins in this award tally. For simplification and to avoid errors, each award in this list has been presumed to have had a prior nomination.)
- Wins: 12
- Nominations: 22

Ileana D'Cruz (born 1 November 1986) is an Indian actress who works in Hindi and Telugu language films, as well some Tamil films. She is recipient of several accolades, including a Filmfare Award, Filmfare Award South, Zee Cine Award, Screen Award, and Stardust Award each.

D’Cruz made her screen debut in 2006 with the Telugu-language film Devadasu, which was commercially successful where she won the Filmfare Award for Best Female Debut - South. Ileana received her breakthrough with the 2006 Telugu-language action thriller film Pokiri, in which she had her first Filmfare Award for Best Actress - Telugu nomination. She continued being nominated for Jalsa (2008) and Kick (2009). D'Cruz went and expanded to Hindi Cinema after she made her Hindi debut with Barfi! (2012), where she won several accolades including the Filmfare Award for Best Female Debut.

== Film awards ==
Year	Award	Category	Film	Result	Ref.
2006	Filmfare Awards South	Best Actress – Telugu	Pokiri	Nominated	
2006	Filmfare Awards South	Best Female Debut – South	Devadasu	Won	
2009	Filmfare Awards South	Best Actress – Telugu	Jalsa	Nominated	
2009	Santosham Film Awards	Best Actress	Jalsa	Won	
2010	Filmfare Awards South	Best Actress – Telugu	Kick	Nominated	
2012	Vijay Awards	Favourite Heroine	Nanban	Nominated	
2012	BIG Star Entertainment Awards	Most Entertaining Actor (Film) Debut – Female	Barfi!	Nominated	
2013	Filmfare Awards	Best Female Debut	Barfi!	Won	
2013	Filmfare Awards	Best Supporting Actress	Barfi!	Nominated	
2013	Screen Awards	Most Promising Newcomer – Female	Barfi!	Won	
2013	Screen Awards	Best Supporting Actress	Barfi!	Nominated	
2013	Zee Cine Awards	Best Female Debut	Barfi!	Won	
2013	Stardust Awards	Superstar of Tomorrow – Female	Barfi!	Nominated	
2013	Star Guild Awards	Best Female Debut	Barfi!	Won	
2013	Times of India Film Awards	Best Female Debut	Barfi!	Won	
2013	Times of India Film Awards	Best Supporting Actress	Barfi!	Won	
2013	ETC Bollywood Business Awards	Most Profitable Debut – Female	Barfi!	Won	
2014	Stardust Awards	Superstar of Tomorrow – Female	Main Tera Hero	Nominated	
2014	Stardust Awards	Superstar of Tomorrow – Female	Happy Ending	Nominated	
2014	Stardust Awards	Best Actress in a Comedy or Romance	Happy Ending	Nominated	
2015	Screen Awards	Best Actress – Popular Choice	Main Tera Hero	Nominated	
2017	BIG Star Entertainment Awards	Most Entertaining Actress in a Romantic Film	Rustom	Nominated	
2017	BIG Star Entertainment Awards	Most Entertaining Actress in a Thriller Role	Rustom	Nominated	
2022	Hit List OTT Awards	Best Supporting Actor – Female	The Big Bull	Won	

== Other recognitions ==
- 2012: She was placed 2nd in The Times of India's 10 Most Promising Female Newcomers list.
- 2012: She was placed 8th in Rediff.com "Top 10 Bollywood actresses" list.
- 2015: Filmfare Glamour and Style Award for Emerging Face of the Year.
- 2021: She was placed 18th in Forbes India's most influential stars on Instagram in South cinema.

=== Times of India ===
Year	Category	Rank	Ref.
2012	Times Most Desirable Woman	#20	
2013	Times Most Desirable Woman	#21	
2013	Hyderabad Times Most Desirable Woman	#6	
2013	Chennai Times Most Desirable Woman	#8	
2014	Hyderabad Times Most Desirable Woman	#4	
2014	Chennai Times Most Desirable Woman	#14	
