= Shefali Alvares =

Indian playback singer

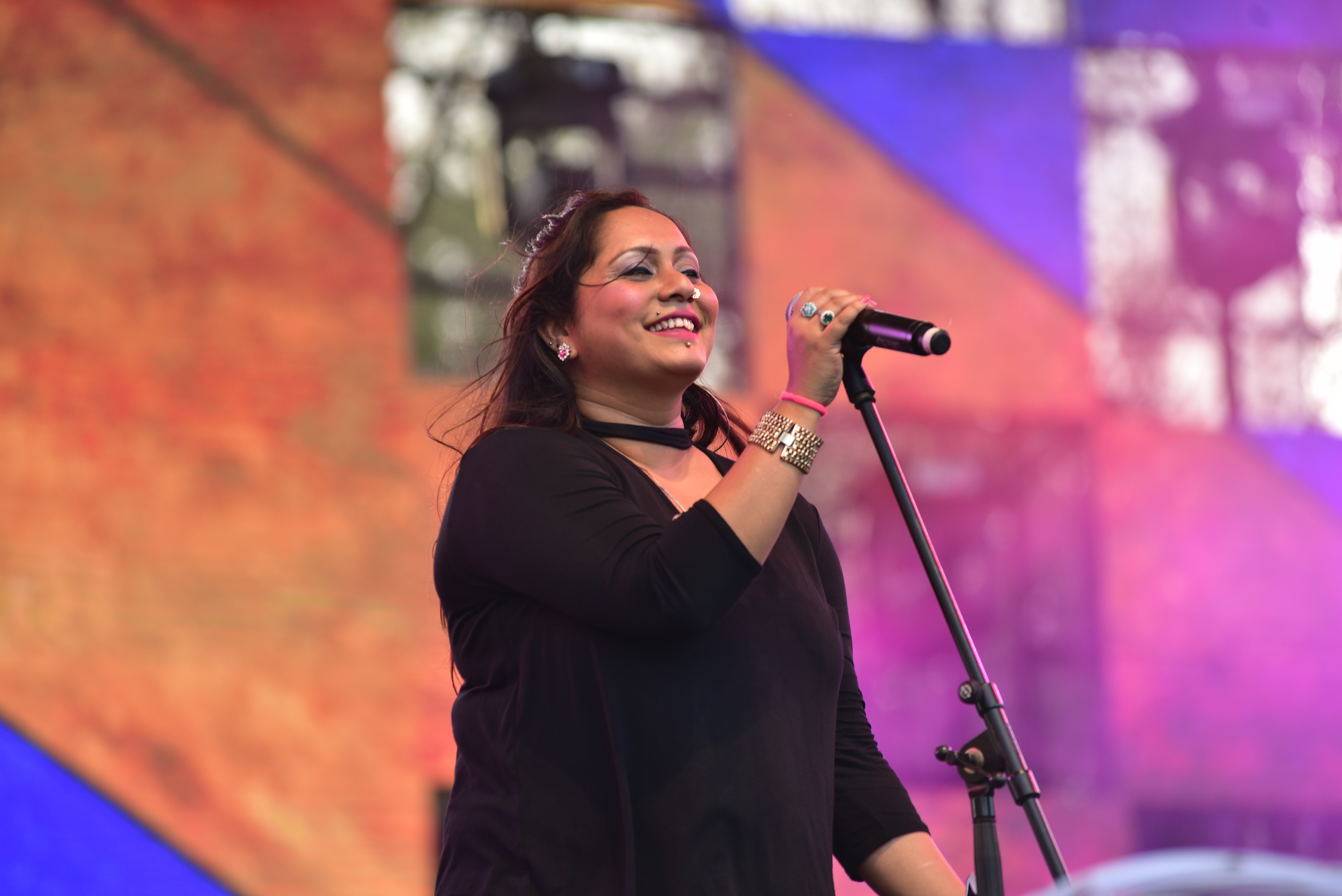
- Alvares in 2017

Background information
- Occupations: Indian playback singer and live performer
- Years active: 2005-present

Shefali Alvares is an Indian playback singer. She has sung many songs such as "Subah Hone Na De" from Desi Boyz and "Party On My Mind" from Race 2 in Bollywood movies.

== Early life ==
Shefali was born in a musical family.

== Film Songs ==
Year	Film	Song name	Language	Composer	Lyrics	Co-singer
2005	Dil Jo Bhi Kahey...	"Kaun Jaane"	Hindi	Shankar-Ehsaan-Loy	Javed Akhtar	Shankar Mahadevan
2009	Saleem	"O Mama Miya"	Telugu	Sandeep Chowta	Chandrabose	Sunny
2011	Dil Toh Baccha Hai Ji	"Yeh Dil Hai Nakhrewala"	Hindi	Pritam	Neelesh Misra	
2011	Kucch Luv Jaisaa	"Thoda Sa Pyaar (Madhu's Search for Love)"	Hindi	Pritam	Irshad Kamil	Naresh Iyer
2011	Mujhse Fraaandship Karoge	"Baatein Shuru"	Hindi	Raghu Dixit	Anvita Dutt	Joi Barua
2011	Always Kabhi Kabhi	"Better Not Mess With Me (Club Mix)"	Hindi	Pritam	Irfan Siddiqui	
2011	Desi Boyz	"Subha Hone Na De"	Hindi	Pritam	Kumaar	Mika Singh, Yo Yo Honey Singh, Bohemia
2012	Ek Main Aur Ekk Tu	"Ek Main Aur Ekk Tu (Remix)"	Hindi	Amit Trivedi	Amitabh bhattacharya	Benny Dayal, Anushka Manchanda
2012	Agent Vinod	"Steal the Night (I'll Do the Talking)"	Hindi	Pritam	Amitabh bhattacharya	Aditi Singh Sharma, Neeraj Shridhar, Barbie Mod
2012	Cocktail	"Tera Naam Japti Phiran"	Hindi	Pritam	Irshad Kamil	Javed Bashir, Nikhil D'Souza
2012	Student of the Year	"Ratta Maar"	Hindi	Vishal–Shekhar	Anvita Dutt	Vishal Dadlani
2012	Student of the Year	"Gulabi Aankhein"	Hindi + English	Vishal–Shekhar	Anvita Dutt	
2012	Naayak	"Kathi Lanti Pilla"	Telugu	S. Thaman	Chandrabose	S.Thaman
2013	Race 2	"Party On My Mind"	Hindi	Pritam	Prashant Ingole	K.K., Yo Yo Honey Singh
2013	Race 2	"Party on My Mind" (Remix)	Hindi	Pritam	Prashant Ingole	K.K., Yo Yo Honey Singh
2013	Race 2	"Race 2" (Mashup)	Hindi	Pritam	Mayur Puri	Atif Aslam, Sunidhi Chauhan, Benny Dayal, Shalmali Kholgade, KK, Yo Yo Honey Singh, Vishal Dadlani, Anushka Manchanda, Ritu Pathak
2013	Race 2	"Immature"	Hindi	Pritam		
2013	Baadshah	"Baadshah Title Song"	Telugu	S. Thaman	Viswa	S.Thaman, Geeta Madhuri, Hema Chandra
2013	Swamy Ra Ra	"Life Ante"	Telugu	Sunny M.R	Krishna Chaitanya	
2013	Yeh Jawaani Hai Deewani	"Badtameez Dil"	Hindi	Pritam	Amitabh Bhattacharya	Benny Dayal
2013	Aatma	"Jee Le Jyada"	Hindi	Sangeet & Sidharth Haldipur	Kumaar	Anusha Mani, Alyssa Mendonsa, Apeksha Dandekar
2013	D-Day	"Alvida"	Hindi	Shankar-Ehsaan-Loy	Niranjan Iyengar	
2013	Phata Poster Nikla Hero	"Hey Mr. DJ"	Hindi	Pritam	Amitabh Bhattacharya	Shalmali Kholgade, Benny Dayal
2013	Phata Poster Nikla Hero	Dhating Naach	Hindi	Pritam	Amitabh Bhattacharya	Neha Kakkar, Nakash Aziz
2014	Mr Joe B. Carvalho	"Chumma Chatti"	Hindi	Amartya Rahut	Amitabh Bhattacharya	Amartya Rahut
2014	Yaariyan	"ABCD"	Hindi	Pritam	Amitabh Bhattacharya	Benny Dayal, Yo Yo Honey Singh
2014	Queen	"O Gujariya"	Hindi	Amit Trivedi	Anvita Dutt	Nikhil D'Souza
2014	Happy Ending	"G Phaad Ke"	Hindi	Sachin–Jigar	Ashish Pandit	Divya Kumar
2015	Bombay Velvet	"Aam Hindustani"	Hindi	Amit Trivedi	Amitabh Bhattacharya	
2015	Bombay Velvet	"Mohabbat Buri Bimari (version 3)"	Hindi	Amit Trivedi	Amitabh Bhattacharya	
2015	Bombay Velvet	"Shut Up"	Hindi	Amit Trivedi	Amitabh Bhattacharya	
2015	ABCD 2	"Tattoo"	Hindi	Sachin–Jigar	Mayur Puri	
2015	ABCD 2	"If You Hold My Hand"	Hindi	Sachin–Jigar	Mayur Puri	Benny Dayal, Anushka Manchanda
2016	Dishoom	"Subha Hone Na De" (Remix)	Hindi	Pritam	Kumaar	Mika Singh
2017	Jab Harry Met Sejal	"Beech Beech Mein"	Hindi	Pritam	Irshad Kamil	Arijit Singh, Shalmali Kholgade
