= Dishoom =

2016 Indian film by Rohit Dhawan

- Theatrical release poster
- Directed by: Rohit Dhawan
- Written by: Rohit Dhawan; Tushar Hiranandani
- Dialogues by: Hussain Dalal
- Produced by: Sajid Nadiadwala
- Starring: John Abraham; Varun Dhawan; Jacqueline Fernandez; Saqib Saleem; Akshaye Khanna
- Cinematography: Ayananka Bose
- Edited by: Ritesh Soni
- Music by: Songs: Pritam; Score: Abhijit Vaghani
- Production company: Nadiadwala Grandson Entertainment
- Distributed by: Eros International
- Release date: 29 July 2016
- Running time: 124 minutes
- Country: India
- Language: Hindi
- Budget: ₹55 crore
- Box office: est. ₹119.58 crore

Dishoom (transl. Bang) is a 2016 Indian Hindi-language buddy cop action comedy film directed by Rohit Dhawan and produced by Sajid Nadiadwala. It stars John Abraham, Varun Dhawan, Jacqueline Fernandez, Saqib Saleem and Akshaye Khanna, while Parineeti Chopra, Akshay Kumar and Nargis Fakhri make special appearances in the film. The film revolves around two cops tasked with rescuing a kidnapped Indian cricketer from a cricket bookie.

Dishoom was released theatrically worldwide on 29 July 2016 to mixed-to-positive reviews from critics and became a moderately successful venture at the box office, earning ₹119 crore worldwide.

== Plot ==
During a cricket tournament in the Middle East, 48 hours prior to the final match between India and Pakistan, India's top cricketer Viraj Sharma goes missing. Indian authorities get a video tape of an unknown man wearing a Pakistani team jersey and claiming to have abducted Viraj till the India vs Pakistan cricket match two days later and warning them not to cancel the match or else Viraj will be killed. Attempting to avoid media outrage, Gayatri Shubha Mishra, the External Affairs Minister of India, sends special task force officer Kabir Shergill IPS to U.A.E for a 36-hour manhunt. After being received by and getting into a semi-scuffle with a local officer, Saeed Naqvi, Kabir, who is a no-nonsense cop, bumps into a rookie Indo-Emirati police officer Junaid Ansari, who has never been able to solve a case but has a good knowledge of the town which he acquired during his first incomplete case of finding a dog named Bradman. Both Kabir and Junaid start their investigation with a CCTV footage of Viraj's hotel and find out that on the night of his disappearance, Viraj went out with a local girl, Samira Dalal. On confronting her, they learn that she took Viraj to a friend's birthday party but he left soon.

Later, they roam around the town to meet a local goon nicknamed Khabri Chacha who has information about everything. He directs them to Sameer Gazi, the city's biggest gay party animal who met Viraj in the same party, but the duo are still unable to lay hands on any clue. Finally, they get a breakthrough by tracking down Viraj's cellphone from the apartment of a pickpocket, Ishika, who claims to have stolen the cell phone from a stranger, the previous night, in a supermarket. During this time, Junaid finally finds Bradman and vows to never lose track of him, tying a tracker band around his neck, containing a hidden camera. The duo also manages to capture the person in the video, but discovers that he is just a struggling actor being used as the face in the video by the real kidnapper. However, Junaid is shocked when the actor recognizes the "stranger" Ishika had mentioned as the fugitive who conducted his audition, and rubs a sketch clue of evidence out to Kabir, who asks Saeed, Junaid's superior, to identify the stranger. Meanwhile, it is revealed that the real kidnapper is a cricket bookie Wagah, who along with his assistant Altaf, the stranger, has abducted Viraj and offered him 300 million rupees to under play in the final.

They finally close the deal for 500 million, but when the deal didn't work out and Viraj closeted onto them, bluffing an imposter Wagah into believing he would underplay, they kidnap him permanently till the final match is played. Kabir, a suspended-from-duty Junaid and Ishika go to an underground Arabian club in Altaf's native state Abuddin, full of goons and guns, where Ishika helps Kabir and Junaid by distracting the goons and later Kabir rescues her from them. During the journey, Junaid reveals to Ishika that Kabir suffered from cancer and was betrayed for this reason by his girlfriend Alishka Iyer, having lost his smile ever since. Hearing this, Ishika warms up to Kabir, clicking and sending photos of both together while he is still asleep, to Alishka, with whom he had a breakup after he caught her cheating on him with customs officer Vishal Sinha, Kabir's former colleague. Kabir spots Altaf and both try to chase him down but before they could succeed, a sniper kills Altaf. Wagah calls and confesses to Kabir that he got him killed and they should stop searching for Viraj. Wagah confronts Viraj, threatens to kill his family, shoots both a Mumbai-based partner and his own manager, and asks his wife to leave with their son, finally stranded, with only Bradman, revealed to be their family dog, by his side.

On returning to Abu Dhabi, Kabir and Junaid are taken off the case and Kabir ordered to fly back to India. Seeing Kabir walk towards the airport, Ishika goes soft and confesses her feelings for Kabir to Junaid. At the 11th hour, Junaid gets a clue of Viraj's whereabout through the camera on Bradman's neck band, as Wagah has hidden him in a yacht near the team's hotel. Both reach the location only to discover that Wagah has fled leaving behind Viraj tied with a time bomb after Wagah realised that Bradman carried a GPS tracker. With only minutes left for the bomb to blast, Kabir negotiates with Wagah to stop the bomb in return of 5 billion rupees from the Indian Government. Wagah takes the money but refuses to stop the bomb. After witnessing the blast from a distance, Wagah walks into the cricket stadium expecting the match to begin without Viraj, but to his shock, Viraj is alive and walks into the ground all ready to play as it is revealed that Kabir and Junaid helped Viraj to get out of the jacket by dislocating his shoulder and all three had jumped into water just before the blast. After seeing his plan failed, Wagah tries to escape only to be apprehended by the duo. Kabir, who now has feelings for Ishika, returns to India along with her, while Junaid, who regains his duty, gets a marriage proposal from an Indian girl, Muskaan and also flies to India to meet her.

== Cast ==
- John Abraham as Kabir "K" Shergill, an Indian STF officer
- Varun Dhawan as Junaid "J" Ansari, an Indo-Emirati rookie and Kabir's subordinate
- Jacqueline Fernandez as Meera "Ishika" Behl alias Parvati / Pakeezah, a pick-pocketer who ends up stealing Viraj's phone
- Saqib Saleem as Viraj Sharma (loosely based on Virat Kohli)
- Akshaye Khanna as Wagah
- Rashmi Nigam as Wagah's wife
- Tarun Khanna as Inspector Saeed Naqvi, a local officer and Kabir's tentative partner who gets replaced by Junaid
- Rahul Dev as Altaaf Dad, Wagah's protege and assistant
- Mir Sarwar as Hadeed, a weapons trader
- Mansoor as Captain Yusuf Al-Dami, Abu Dhabi Police Chief
- Pawan Chopra as Mishkat Sudhir, BCCI Chief
- Manu Malik as Shree, the person in the lift
- Sahil Phull as Customs Officer Vishal Sinha, Kabir's former colleague who deceives him by having an affair with Alishka
- Anupriya Goenka as Alishka Iyer, Kabir's girlfriend with whom he breaks up after having an affair with Vishal
- Jatin Gaur as Rashid Alvi Farooq, a tech-expert in Abu Dhabi Police
- Faisal Rashid as a struggling actor who was forced to pose as a fanatical Pakistan supporter
- Mona Ambegaonkar as Gayatri Shubha Mishra, the External Affairs Minister of India
- Akash Dhar as Wagah's henchman
- Mohinder Amarnath as Dhananjay Sadanand, Viraj's coach

Special appearances

- Akshay Kumar as Sameer Gazi, a party animal and the city's biggest one who meets Viraj in a party
- Parineeti Chopra as Muskaan Raza Qureshi, a prospective bride who wishes to meet Junaid and becomes his girlfriend
- Nargis Fakhri as Samira Dalal, a local socialite who takes Viraj to a friend's birthday party
- Aakash Chopra as himself, semi-final commentator
- Atul Wassan as himself, final commentator
- Rameez Raja as himself, final commentator
- Vijay Raaz as Mushtaq Rizvi / Khabri Chacha, a local goon in Abu Dhabi who directs Kabir and Junaid to Sameer
- Satish Kaushik in a voiceover appearance as Arif Raza Qureshi, Muskaan's father

== Production ==
=== Filming ===
The first schedule of the film started on June 27, 2015, at Mehboob Studio. Varun Dhawan and Jacqueline Fernandez joined the set on 4 July 2015. Abu Dhabi was also a filming location; the production crew chose Abu Dhabi, as they would benefit from the Emirate's 30% rebate scheme.

== Soundtrack ==
Dishoom

Soundtrack album by Pritam Chakraborty
- Released: 16 June 2016
- Genre: Feature film soundtrack
- Length: 27:24
- Language: Hindi
- Label: T-Series

Pritam Chakraborty chronology
Azhar (2016)	Dishoom (2016)	Ae Dil Hai Mushkil (2016)

The music for Dishoom is composed by Pritam Chakraborty while lyrics have been penned by Kumaar and Mayur Puri, with Ashish Pandit as a special guest. The music rights have been acquired by T-Series. The full music album was released on 16 June 2016. Pritam remixed "Subha Hone Na De" from his original composition from Desi Boyz, a film which was also directed by Rohit Dhawan.

No.	Title	Lyrics	Singer(s)	Length
1.	"Sau Tarah Ke"	Kumaar, Hook: Ashish Pandit	Jonita Gandhi, Amit Mishra	3:58
2.	"Toh Dishoom"	Mayur Puri	Raftaar, Shahid Mallya	4:03
3.	"Jaaneman Aah" (Version 1)	Mayur Puri	Aman Trikha, Antara Mitra	3:50
4.	"Sau Tarah Ke" (Revisited)	Mayur Puri	Abhijeet Sawant, Aditi Singh Sharma	3:59
5.	"Jaaneman Aah" (Version 2)	Mayur Puri	Nakash Aziz, Antara Mitra	3:50
6.	"Ishqa"	Kumaar	Abhijeet Sawant, Antara Mitra	2:47
7.	"Subha Hone Na De" (Remix)	Kumaar	Mika Singh, Bohemia, Shefali Alvares	4:59
Total length:				27:24

== Reception ==
On the review aggregation website Rotten Tomatoes, the film has a rating of 56%, based on 9 reviews, with an average rating of 5.1/10.

Bollywood Hungama gave 3.5/5 stars and wrote "Dishoom has a predictable storyline, but the engaging narrative, coupled with rich visuals and high octane action work in the favour of the film. Add to this the star power of John Abraham and Varun Dhawan, which will definitely attract the youth." Srijana Mitra Das of The Times of India gave 3.5/5 stars and wrote "If you're good with laughter, not logic, Dishoom is actually two much fun."

Anupama Chopra of Hindustan Times gave 3/5 stars and wrote "Dishoom is a silly but fun reworking of the time-tested buddy cop formula. Director and co-writer Rohit Dhawan isn’t aiming for anything more. It’s slick, seductive, disposable entertainment." Ananya Bhattacharya of India Today gave 3/5 stars and wrote "Dishoom, however, despite its decent-enough story, doesn't quite make a mark on the mind. Watch the film for its comedy and action."

Rachit Gupta of Filmfare gave 3/5 stars and wrote "Even though the concept of Dishoom is unoriginal, its got enough slick contemporary treatment to engage its audience. Dishoom has the trappings to entertain fans of '80s and '90s movies." Sarita. A. Tanwar of DNA gave 3/5 stars and wrote "Despite the potholes, Dishoom is a fun for most part. Watch it for the John-Varun bromance and Akshay Kumar’s outrageous cameo."

Surabhi Redkar of Koimoi gave 2.5/5 stars and wrote "As far as buddy cop films go, Dishoom is partly enjoyable." Shubhra Gupta of The Indian Express gave 2/5 stars and wrote "John Abraham and Varun Dhawan's movie is designed like a fast-paced caper but lacks impact. It shines in bits and pieces but the rest is a stretch."

Anna M. M. Vetticad of Firstpost wrote "Dishoom is a sporadically engaging, intermittently funny, yet always insubstantial film." Namratha Joshi of The Hindu wrote "Dishoom is the cinematic equivalent of masala chai; an all too familiar but giddy infusion."

The film was banned by the Pakistan Central Board of Film Censors for depicting an Indian cricketer getting kidnapped during an India and Pakistan match.
