= Varun Dhawan =

Indian actor (born 1987)

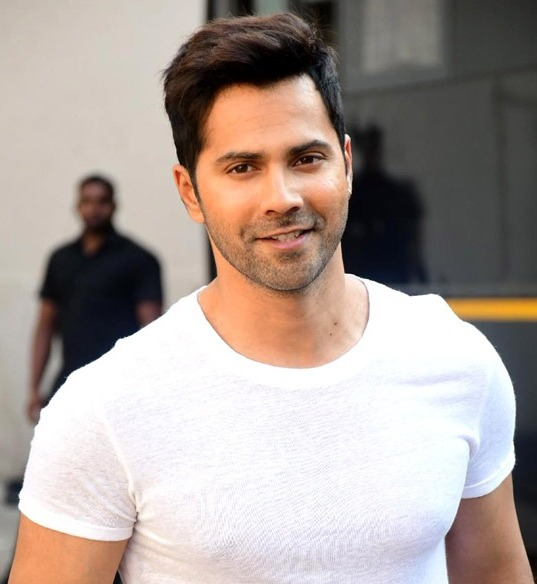
- Dhawan in 2025
- Born: 24 April 1987 (age 39)
- Education: Nottingham Trent University
- Occupation: Actor
- Years active: 2012–present
- Spouse: Natasha Dalal (m. 2021)
- Children: 1
- Parents: David Dhawan (father); Karuna Dhawan (mother)
- Relatives: Dhawan family
- Awards: Full list

Signature
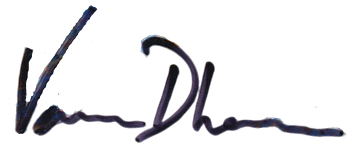

Varun Dhawan (Hindi pronunciation: [ʋəɾʊɳ d̪ʱəʋən]; born 24 April 1987) is an Indian actor who works in Hindi films. One of India's highest-paid actors, his accolades include four Zee Cine Awards and two IIFA Awards alongside five Filmfare nominations. Dhawan has been featured in Forbes India's Celebrity 100 list in the 2010s.

The son of film director David Dhawan, he graduated in business studies from Nottingham Trent University. He began his career as an assistant director to Karan Johar in My Name Is Khan (2010) and subsequently made his acting debut in 2012 with Johar's teen drama Student of the Year. He rose to prominence with leading roles in the romantic comedies Main Tera Hero (2014), Humpty Sharma Ki Dulhania (2014), and Badrinath Ki Dulhania (2017); the action comedies Dilwale (2015), Dishoom (2016), and Judwaa 2 (2017); the dance film ABCD 2 (2015); and the drama Sui Dhaaga (2018). Dhawan also received praise for portraying an avenger in the thriller Badlapur (2015) and an aimless man coping with loss in the drama October (2018), roles that differed from his usual on-screen persona.

This success was followed by several films that faced critical and commercial challenges starting with the period drama Kalank, though the 2022 releases the family drama Jugjugg Jeeyo and the horror comedy Bhediya were well-received. He has since had his highest-grossing release portraying Major Hoshiar Singh Dahiya in the war film Border 2 (2026), though this was accompanied by several films that performed poorly. Aside from acting, he is a prominent celebrity endorser for several brands and products. Off-screen, Dhawan is married to designer Natasha Dalal with whom he has a daughter.

== Early life ==
Dhawan was born on 24 April 1987 to David Dhawan, a film director, and Karuna Dhawan. His family is Punjabi Hindu. His elder brother, Rohit, is a film director known for his debut venture Desi Boyz, while his uncle, Anil, is an actor. His other relatives in the entertainment industry include his uncle, fashion designer Manish Malhotra, and his cousins Punit Malhotra and Kunal Kohli, both film directors. He completed his primary education at Bombay Scottish School, Mumbai and later completed his HSC education from the H.R. College of Commerce and Economics. He has a degree in business studies from the Nottingham Trent University, United Kingdom.

== Career ==
=== 2012–2014: Early work and success ===
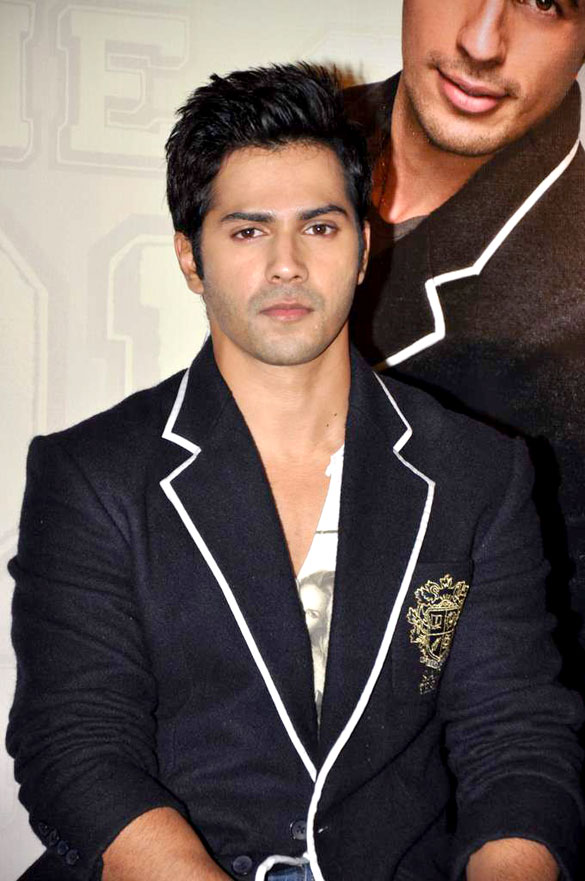
Dhawan at the trailer launch of Student of the Year in 2012

Prior to beginning his acting career, Dhawan worked as an assistant director to Karan Johar on the social drama My Name Is Khan (2010), where one of his fellow assistants was aspiring actor and former model Sidharth Malhotra. He made his acting debut in 2012 with Johar's teen film Student of the Year alongside Malhotra and Alia Bhatt, both in their film debuts. He was cast as Rohan Nanda, the teenage son of a rich businessman, who competes with his girlfriend (Bhatt) and best friend (Malhotra) to win an annual school championship. Film critic Taran Adarsh from Bollywood Hungama found Dhawan to be "a talent one can't help but marvel at" and CNN-IBN's Rajeev Masand added, "[i]t's Varun Dhawan who stands out with a confident, charming turn, able to tackle both comical and vulnerable scenes with ease". Student of the Year was a commercial success, grossing ₹1.09 billion (US$12 million) worldwide.

Dhawan next starred in the romantic comedy Main Tera Hero (2014), a remake of the Telugu film Kandireega, which was produced by Balaji Motion Pictures and directed by his father David. He played an impetuous brat who is involved in a love triangle. Raedita Tandon of Filmfare commended Dhawan on his comic timing and compared him favourably to Govinda and Prabhudheva. The film emerged as a commercial success grossing 780 million Indian rupees worldwide. Dhawan then played Rakesh, a flirtatious Punjabi boy who engages in a romantic affair with an engaged Punjabi woman, in Shashank Khaitan's romantic comedy Humpty Sharma Ki Dulhania. Co-starring Bhatt, the film was described as a tribute to Dilwale Dulhania Le Jayenge (1995) by Johar, who served as producer. Rohit Khilnani of India Today praised his screen presence, and Nandini Ramnath of Mint noted how much he stood out in the "few quieter scenes" of the film. Humpty Sharma Ki Dulhania emerged as one of top-grossing Indian productions of the year, earning ₹1.11 billion (US$12 million) worldwide.

=== 2015–2018: Established actor ===
The crime thriller Badlapur (2015) from director Sriram Raghavan saw Dhawan play Raghu, a father who over the course of 15 years avenges the murder of his wife and son. Portraying Raghu was a "terrifying" experience for Dhawan, who "slipped into depression as after a point it no longer felt like I was acting in a film". Raja Sen of Rediff.com praised his acting range, writing that he "sheds his easy-breezy charm — but, crucially, not his slightly hapless natural likeability — and bubbles up volcanically, his eyes frequently doing the talking." He received a Filmfare Award for Best Actor nomination for his performance.

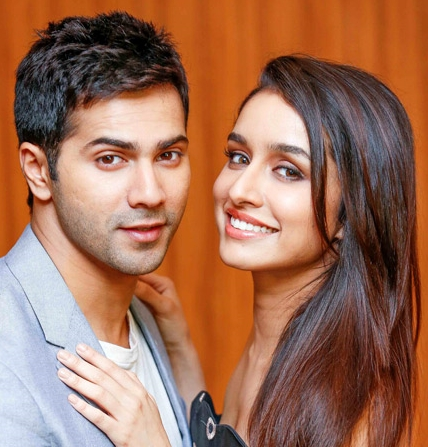
Dhawan and Shraddha Kapoor at a promotional event for ABCD 2 in 2015

Dhawan next starred opposite Shraddha Kapoor in the dance film ABCD 2, in which he portrayed the real-life character of Kings United founder Suresh Mukund, a dancer from Mumbai who went on to win the 2012 World Hip Hop Dance Championship. Critic Shilpa Jamkhandikar of Reuters criticised the feature, finding Dhawan to be the only asset of the film, writing that "except for the honest note he strikes, the rest of the film could have been just a bunch of music videos". ABCD 2 earned ₹1.67 billion (US$18 million) worldwide; the film's commercial performance led Box Office India to consider it an emergence of Dhawan's star power. Dhawan's final appearance that year was in Rohit Shetty's ensemble action drama Dilwale, co-starring Shah Rukh Khan, Kajol and Kriti Sanon, in which he played the younger sibling of Khan's character. Despite mixed reviews from critics, the film proved to be a commercial success, grossing over ₹3.75 billion (US$40 million) worldwide, emerging as Dhawan's highest-grossing release and one of the highest-grossing Bollywood films. He next appeared in the action cop comedy Dishoom (2016), directed by Rohit, alongside John Abraham and Jacqueline Fernandez, as a rookie Indo-Emirati cop. Despite mixed reviews, the film proved to be successful at the box office grossing over ₹1.2 billion (US$13 million) worldwide.

Dhawan reunited with Khaitan and Bhatt for the romantic comedy Badrinath Ki Dulhania (2017), in which he played the titular character, a chauvinist fiancé to Bhatt's character. Shubhra Gupta of The Indian Express wrote that Dhawan "impresses as a boy-struggling-to-be-a-man". In addition, Tushar Joshi of Daily News and Analysis noted that "Varun Dhawan and Alia Bhatt prove that on screen chemistry can be enough sometimes to keep you engaged in an average plot with a predictable narrative". He received his second Best Actor nomination at Filmfare for the film. Later in 2017, he starred in his father's Judwaa 2 alongside Fernandez and Taapsee Pannu, a reboot of his 1997 Salman Khan starrer Judwaa. Both Badrinath Ki Dulhania and Judwaa 2 proved to be commercial successes, earning over ₹2 billion (US$21 million) each. Forbes published that with nine consecutive box office hits and a 100% success ratio, Dhawan had established himself as a "bona fide Bollywood superstar".

Dhawan had two releases in 2018, Shoojit Sircar's drama October and Sharat Katariya's social problem film Sui Dhaaga. October, written by Sircar's frequent collaborator Juhi Chaturvedi, saw him portray Danish Walia, an aimless hotel management trainee whose life undergoes a series of changes when his co-worker goes into a coma. In a highly positive review, Anna M. M. Vetticad of Firstpost commended Dhawan for "effac[ing] his starry swagger and trademark cutesiness to play Dan"; Rohit Vats of Hindustan Times considered it to be his finest performance to date and wrote that "his humour is innate, but his understanding of pain and how it affects the human behaviour is even better". Sui Dhaaga featured Dhawan and Anushka Sharma respectively as Mauji and Mamta, a newly-wed couple in rural India who begin their own small-scale clothing business. Udita Jhunjunwala of Mint reviewed, "Dhawan has perfected the template for playing a simpleton. He brings a similar naiveté to Mauji, albeit endearingly." For October, he received a nomination for the Filmfare Critics Award for Best Actor.

=== 2019–present: Commercial fluctuations ===
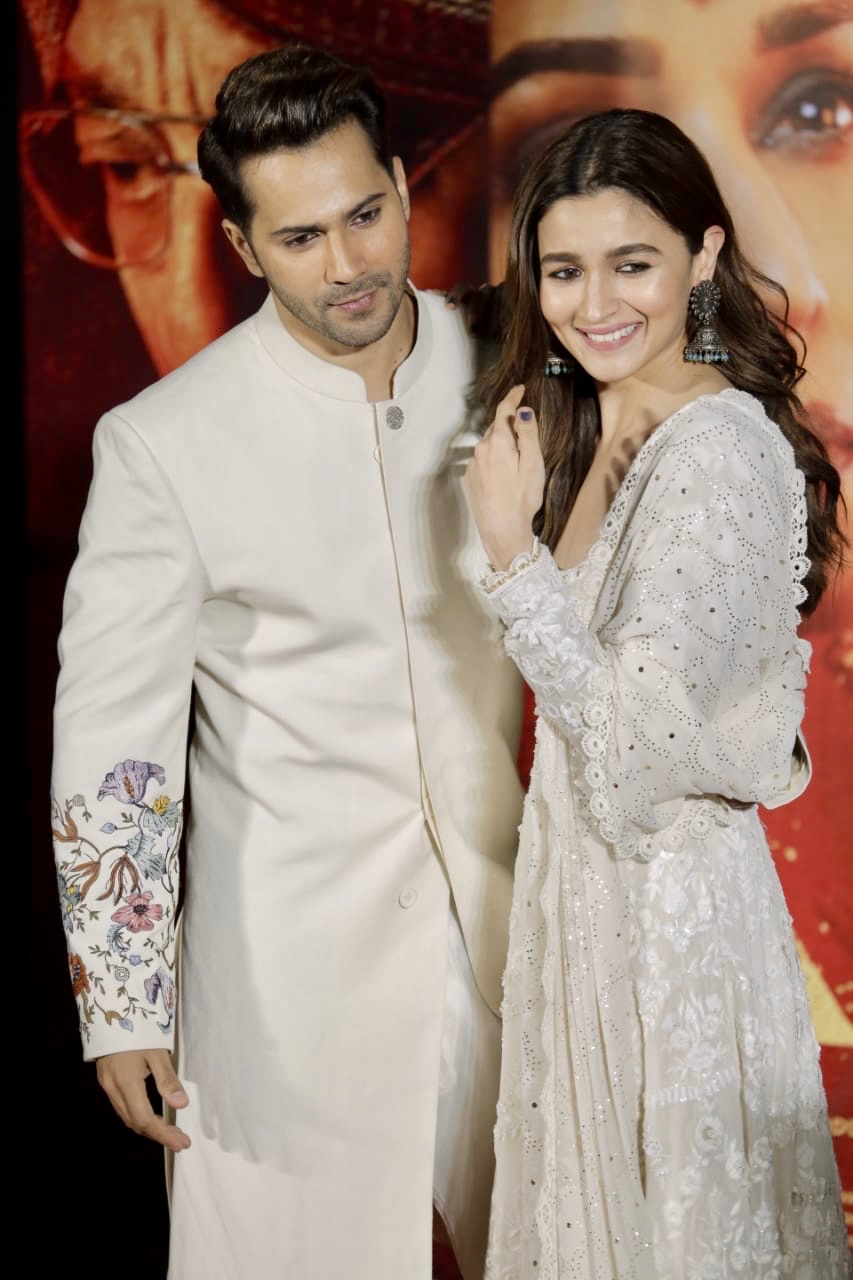
Dhawan and frequent co-star Alia Bhatt promoting Kalank in 2019

Dhawan's sole screen appearance in 2019 was in Abhishek Varman's ensemble period drama Kalank, in which he was once again paired opposite Bhatt. Set in the 1940s prior to the partition of India, the film featured him as a womanising blacksmith; for the physical demands of the part, he trained extensively despite suffering from a knee injury and hamstring tear, and insisted on performing his own stunts. Saibal Chatterjee of NDTV was appreciative of Dhawan's against-type performance in it.

Dhawan began the new decade with the dance film Street Dancer 3D (2020), which Namrata Joshi of The Hindu termed a "compilation of indistinguishable performances". Both Kalank and Street Dancer 3D did not perform well commercially. He worked with his father for a third time in Coolie No. 1, a 2020 adaptation of the Govinda-starrer 1995 film of the same name, which owing to the COVID-19 pandemic released online on Amazon Prime Video. Critical and public reception to the film was negative, largely in light of the nepotism debate due to actor Sushant Singh Rajput's death. In a scathing review, Shubhra Gupta of The Indian Express called the film a "zero wit, no flair" disaster, noting that Dhawan had "channelled Govinda in many of his films much better".

In 2022, Dhawan starred alongside Kiara Advani in Jugjugg Jeeyo, a comedy-drama about divorce. Writing for Hindustan Times, Monika Rawal Kukreja commended him for "adding life to a complex character". It earned ₹1.35 billion (US$14 million) worldwide to emerge as one of the highest-grossing films of the year. Dhawan played the title role in Bhediya, the third instalment in the Maddock Horror Comedy Universe. The film was shot over a span of two months in various locations of Arunachal Pradesh. Sonal Dedhia of News18 wrote that he "is in full form and is a delight to watch as an egoistic prick-turned-reluctant-werewolf". Dhawan starred opposite Janhvi Kapoor in Nitesh Tiwari's Bawaal (2023), a romantic drama about a feuding couple who learn about World War II as they travel across Europe. It was released digitally on Amazon Prime Video. The film received backlash for Holocaust trivialization. In a scathing review, Santanu Das of Hindustan Times criticised the lack of chemistry between the lead pair and dismissed Dhawan as "particularly exasperating to witness".

Dhawan's first release of 2024 came with Citadel: Honey Bunny, the Indian spinoff of the American spy thriller series Citadel, created and directed by Raj & DK, once again for Amazon Prime Video. Playing a stuntman, it marked his first full-fledged action role. Writing for Rediff.com, Mayur Sanap found his performance "sincere" but "unconvincing", preferring that of his co-star Samantha Ruth Prabhu. In another action role, he led the film Baby John, produced by Atlee, which served as a remake of Atlee's own Tamil film Theri (2016). Shubhra Gupta deemed him "all wrong for this kind of film — cameras can help him do the slo-mo swagger thing, but his delivery is fit only for low-fi comedies". It emerged as a box-office bomb.

In 2025, Dhawan reunited with Khaitan and Janhvi Kapoor for the romantic comedy Sunny Sanskari Ki Tulsi Kumari. India Today's Tushar Joshi was appreciative of Dhawan's performance and comic timing in a role in which he "appears his most at ease in years". It underperformed commercially.

Dhawan with Sunny Deol, Anurag Singh and Ahan Shetty (l-r) promoting Border 2

The following year, Dhawan portrayed Major Hoshiar Singh Dahiya among an ensemble led by Sunny Deol in the action film Border 2 (2026), which is set amidst the India–Pakistan war of 1971. During the filming of the Battle of Basantar sequence, he shot alongside real soldiers and sustained a tailbone injury. In a mixed review for Mid-Day, Athulya Nambiar noted that despite pre-release reservations about Dhawan's casting in a more mature role, he ultimately "lets his performance do the talking," by "bringing a quiet strength and composure to the role without slipping into caricature or unintended humour". Dhawan followed this with his father's swan song Hai Jawani Toh Ishq Hona Hai, a romance about a man who becomes entangled in a comedy of errors after simultaneously getting two women (played by Mrunal Thakur and Pooja Hegde) pregnant. Nandini Ramnath of Scroll.in noted that, despite his "remarkable energy", Dhawan was also "the only member of the cast who doesn't seem to notice or care how tired and stale the film is". While Border 2 earned over ₹4.8 billion (US$51 million) to rank as the year's fifth highest-grossing Indian film as well as the highest-grossing of Dhawan's career, Hai Jawani Toh Ishq Hona Hai was average at the box-office.

== Personal life ==
Born into a Hindu family, he considers himself a spiritual person and close to ISKCON. On 24 January 2021, Dhawan married his long-time girlfriend, fashion designer Natasha Dalal whom he first met while studying in sixth grade at Bombay Scottish School, Mumbai. The couple had their first child, a daughter, on 3 June 2024.

== Other work and media image ==
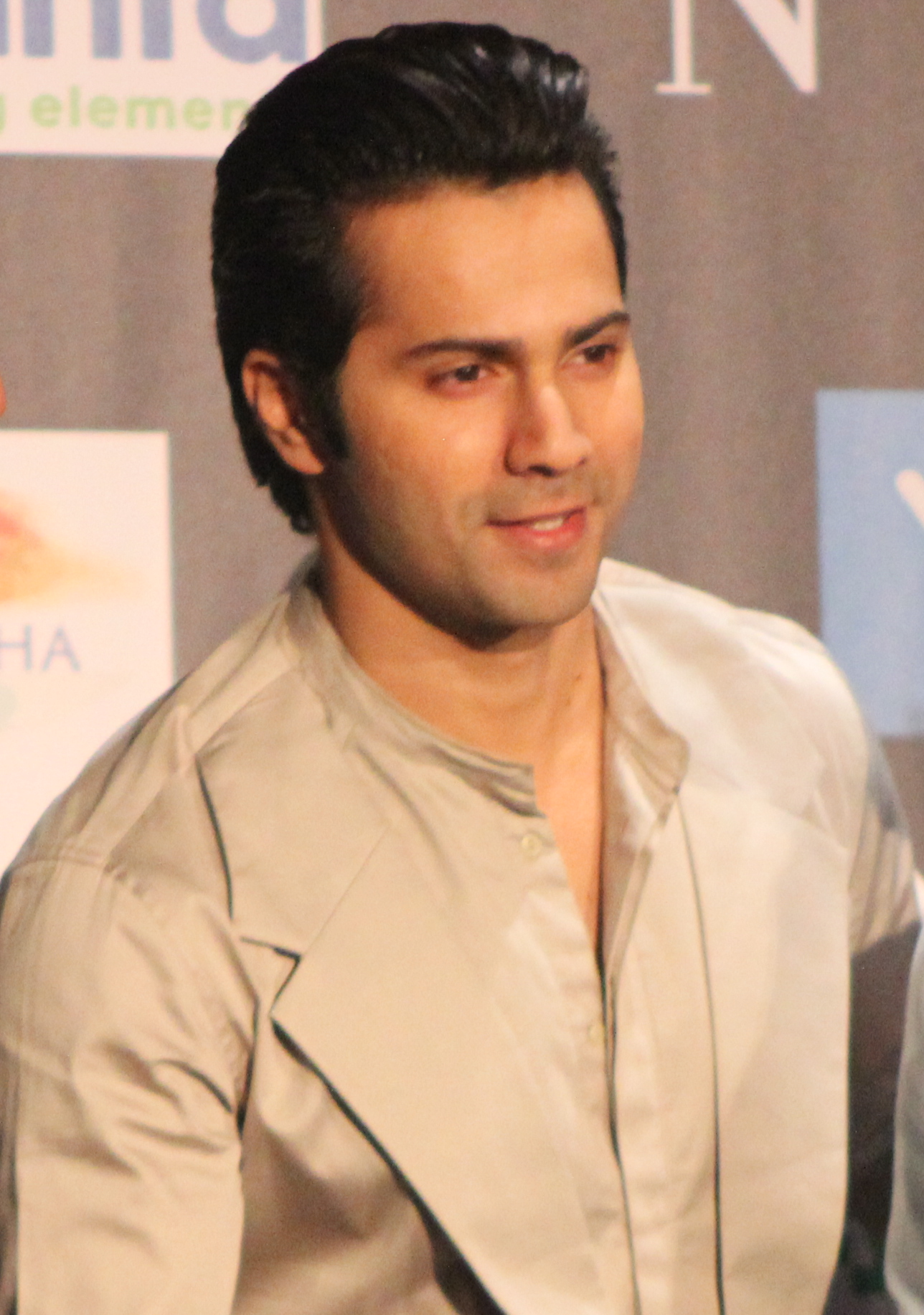
Dhawan in 2017

Rahul Gangwani of Filmfare termed Dhawan a "complete package" and added, "Good looks, a flair for dance, acting chops...and above all a sense of adventure to tread the untried." Zinia Bandyopadhyay of India Today noted, "Dhawan had often been touted as the hit machine of Bollywood. The actor has proved that he is not just a star but also an actor with his versatility and choice of films." Rediff.com has placed Dhawan in its "Top Actors" list of 2015, 2017 and 2018.

Dhawan has appeared in Forbes India's Celebrity 100 list since 2014, peaking at the 15th position in 2018, when the magazine estimated his annual income to be ₹495.8 million (US$5.3 million) and listed him as one of the highest-paid celebrities in the country. In the same year, the Indian edition of GQ featured him among the nation's 50 most influential young people and labelled him as the "most bankable star of his generation". Dhawan is a celebrity endorser for several brands and products such as Fossil Watches, Navratna Cool, Philips, Frooti, Panasonic and Maruti Suzuki (particularly, Arena) among others.

Alongside his acting career, Dhawan performs on stage and has co-hosted two award ceremonies. In 2013, he performed at the Filmfare, Screen, and Stardust award ceremonies, and at an event in Hong Kong. He hosted the 2013 Stardust Awards ceremony with Sidharth Malhotra and Ayushmann Khurrana, and a segment of the 59th Filmfare Awards. He was also part of the 20th Screen Awards, co-hosting the show alongside Shahrukh Khan and Richa Chadda. In 2013, he performed at a special event alongside Malhotra, Bhatt, Kapur, Kapoor, and Badlapur co-star Huma Qureshi to raise funds for the flood-affected victims of Uttarakhand. In September 2014, Dhawan became the brand ambassador of newly formed Indian Super League club FC Goa. He also donated ₹30 Lakhs in PM-CARES Fund of Government of India during the COVID-19 pandemic in India. He worked with Vishwa Shah and Aakash Gupta for a live show named Dugout Dishoom in 2026.

== Filmography ==
Key
†	Denotes films that have not yet been released

=== Films ===
Year	Title	Role	Notes	Ref
2010	My Name Is Khan	—N/a	Assistant director	
2012	Student of the Year	Rohan Nanda		
2014	Main Tera Hero	Sreenath "Seenu" Prasad		
2014	Humpty Sharma Ki Dulhania	Rakesh "Humpty" Sharma		
2015	Badlapur	Raghav Purohit		
2015	ABCD 2	Suresh "Suru" Mukund		
2015	Dilwale	Veer Bakshi		
2016	Dishoom	Junaid Ansari		
2017	Badrinath Ki Dulhania	Badrinath "Badri" Bansal		
2017	Judwaa 2	Raja Malhotra / Prem Malhotra (Note: Dhawan played dual roles in the film.)		
2018	October	Danish Walia		
2018	Sui Dhaaga	Mauji Sharma		
2018	Nawabzaade	Himself	Special appearance in song "High Rated Gabru"	
2019	Kalank	Zafar Chaudhary		
2020	Street Dancer 3D	Sahej Singh Narula		
2020	Coolie No. 1	Raju Coolie / Kunwar Raj Pratap Singh		
2021	Antim: The Final Truth	Unnamed	Special appearance in song "Vighnaharta"	
2022	Jugjugg Jeeyo	Kuldeep "Kuku" Saini		
2022	Bhediya	Bhaskar aka Bhediya		
2023	Bawaal	Ajay Dixit		
2023	Rocky Aur Rani Kii Prem Kahaani	Unnamed	Cameo appearance in song "Heart Throb"	
2024	Munjya	Bhaskar / Bhediya	Cameo appearance	
2024	Stree 2	Bhaskar / Bhediya	Cameo appearance	
2024	Baby John	DCP Satya Verma aka Baby John		
2025	Sunny Sanskari Ki Tulsi Kumari	Sunny Sanskari		
2025	Thamma	Bhaskar / Bhediya	Cameo appearance	
2026	Border 2	Major Hoshiar Singh Dahiya, PVC		
2026	Hai Jawani Toh Ishq Hona Hai	Jass Ahuja		

=== Television ===
Year	Title	Role	Notes	Ref.
2023	Citadel	Rahi "Bunny" Gambir	Voiceover	
2024	Citadel: Honey Bunny	Rahi "Bunny" Gambir		
2026	India's Got Latent	Himself	Guest judge on panel	

== Discography ==
Year	Title	Album	Composer	Ref.
2014	"Lucky Tu Lucky Me"	Humpty Sharma Ki Dulhania	Sachin–Jigar	
2015	"Happy Birthday"	ABCD 2	Sachin–Jigar	

== Awards and nominations ==
Dhawan has received five Filmfare Awards nominations - Best Male Debut for Student of the Year (2012), Best Actor for Badlapur (2015), and Badrinath Ki Dulhania (2017) and Best Actor - Critics for his performance in October (2018) and Bhediya (2022).
