= Rohit Dhawan =

Indian filmmaker (born 1983)

- Born: 26 December 1983 (age 42); Mumbai, Maharashtra, India
- Occupations: Filmmaker; screenwriter
- Years active: 2006–present
- Spouse: Jaanvi Desai (m. 2012)
- Children: 2
- Father: David Dhawan
- Relatives: Varun Dhawan (brother)
- Family: Dhawan Family

Rohit Dhawan (born 26 December 1983) is an Indian filmmaker and screenwriter. He is the elder son of filmmaker David Dhawan, and the brother of Varun Dhawan.

== Personal life ==
Rohit Dhawan was born to director David Dhawan and Karuna Chopra on 26 December 1983 in Mumbai, Maharashtra. He is the elder brother of actor, Varun Dhawan, and nephew of Anil Dhawan and late, Ashok Dhawan. His paternal cousin is actor Siddharth Dhawan, Anil Dhawan's son. His maternal cousin is director Kunal Kohli. He has a filmmaking degree from New York University.

Rohit Dhawan married entrepreneur Jaanvi Desai on 10 February 2012 in Goa, after dating for 7 years. They have two children, daughter Niyara (born on 30 May 2018) and a son Abheer (born on 4 May 2022).

== Filmography ==
Year	Title	Director	Screenwriter
2006	Don	Assistant	No
2007	Partner	Associate	No
2011	Desi Boyz	Yes	Yes
2016	Dishoom	Yes	Yes
2023	Shehzada	Yes	Yes
