= Badrinath Ki Dulhania =

2017 Indian film by Shashank Khaitan

- Theatrical release poster
- Directed by: Shashank Khaitan
- Written by: Shashank Khaitan
- Produced by: Hiroo Yash Johar; Karan Johar; Apoorva Mehta
- Starring: Varun Dhawan; Alia Bhatt
- Cinematography: Neha Parti Matiyani
- Edited by: Manan Ajay Sagar
- Music by: Score: John Stewart Eduri; Songs: Akhil Sachdeva; Tanishk Bagchi; Amaal Mallik; Bappi Lahiri
- Production company: Dharma Productions
- Distributed by: Fox Star Studios
- Release date: 10 March 2017 (India)
- Running time: 139 minutes
- Country: India
- Language: Hindi
- Budget: ₹39 crore
- Box office: ₹200.45 crore

Badrinath Ki Dulhania (transl. Badrinath's Bride) is a 2017 Indian romantic comedy film written and directed by Shashank Khaitan and produced by Dharma Productions. It is the second installment of the Dulhania franchise and a spiritual successor to Humpty Sharma Ki Dulhania (2014), the film stars Varun Dhawan and Alia Bhatt. It follows the story of an aspiring independent air hostess from a small town who refuses to conform to the patriarchal expectations of her chauvinistic fiancé.

Principal photography commenced in May 2016 and took place in Panvel, Singapore, and Kota. The film was theatrically released in India on 10 March 2017 during the Holi weekend and became a financial success, earning over ₹200.45 crores worldwide.

At the 63rd Filmfare Awards, Badrinath Ki Dulhania received 8 nominations, including Best Film, Best Director (Khaitan), Best Actor (Dhawan) and Best Actress (Bhatt), and won Best Male Playback Singer (Arijit Singh for "Roke Na Ruke Naina").

== Plot ==
Badrinath "Badri" Bansal is the youngest son in a wealthy family from Jhansi, where his father, Ambar, exerts strict control over the lives of his children. Badri's elder brother, Alok, once in love with another woman, was forced to abandon his dreams and enter into an arranged marriage with Urmila after their father's heart attack. This marriage has left Alok deeply unhappy, as Urmila, despite being intelligent and well-qualified, is not allowed to work, and Alok spends much of his time drinking to cope with his dissatisfaction. Badri, observing his brother's plight, fears the same fate for himself and becomes desperate to avoid it.

At a wedding, Badri meets Vaidehi Trivedi, a beautiful and well-educated woman who has her own career aspirations. Despite his limited education, Badri becomes infatuated with Vaidehi and decides that he must marry her, seeking his father's approval for the union. However, Vaidehi is uninterested in marriage, especially after a previous relationship ended in betrayal, where her ex-boyfriend Sagar tricked her family and ran off with their money. Although Badri helps Vaidehi's sister with her marriage, winning some favor with Vaidehi, she ultimately runs away on their wedding day, choosing to pursue her dream of becoming a flight attendant in Singapore instead.

Heartbroken and under pressure from his father, Badri follows Vaidehi to Singapore, where he confronts her in an intense and emotional encounter. Though initially furious, Badri gradually begins to understand and respect Vaidehi's independence and ambitions. As they spend more time together, Badri realizes that if they are to be together, he must support her career and convince his father to accept their relationship on more equal terms. Vaidehi agrees to consider marriage only if Badri can secure her right to work and live freely, a significant challenge given his father's traditional views.

Returning to Jhansi, Badri finally stands up to his father, Ambar, defending Vaidehi's right to work and asserting their decision to marry on their own terms. Vaidehi arrives in Jhansi, and together they confront Ambar, insisting that their marriage will proceed regardless of his approval. The story concludes with Vaidehi finishing her training and returning to India, where she and Badri maintain a long-distance relationship before reuniting. They vow to raise their future children in a more progressive environment, rejecting traditional practices like dowry and ensuring that gender equality is upheld within their family. Their journey marks a significant shift in the family's dynamics, challenging and changing the deeply entrenched patriarchal values.

== Cast ==
- Varun Dhawan as Badrinath "Badri" Bansal
- Alia Bhatt as Vaidehi Trivedi Bansal
- Rituraj Singh as Ambarnath "Ambar" Bansal: Sandhya's husband, Alok and Badri's father
- Yash Sinha as Aloknath "Alok" Bansal: Ambar and Sandhya's son, Badri's elder brother, Urmila's husband
- Shweta Basu Prasad as Urmila Shukla Bansal: Alok's wife
- Swanand Kirkire as Mayank Trivedi: Manasvi's husband, Kritika and Vaidehi's father
- Kanupriya Pandit as Manasvi Trivedi: Kritika and Vaidehi's mother
- Sahil Vaid as Somdev Mishra: Badrinath's best friend
- Sukhmani Lamba as Kritika Mishra (née Trivedi): Mayank and Manasvi's elder daughter; Vaidehi's elder sister; Bhushan's wife
- Aparshakti Khurana as Bhushan Mishra: Kritika's husband
- Rajendra Sethi as Jitendra Mishra: Bhushan's father
- Aakanksha Singh as Kiran Kakkar: Vaidehi's best friend and flatmate in Singapore
- Gaurav Pandey as Gurmeet Singh Lamba: Vaidehi's friend in Singapore and Kiran's boyfriend
- Gauahar Khan as Sergeant Laxmi Shankar
- Atul Narang as Sagar: Vaidehi's Former Fiancé

== Production ==
Badrinath Ki Dulhania marks the second installment of a franchise that began with the romantic comedy Humpty Sharma Ki Dulhania (2014), which was also directed by Shashank Khaitan, produced by Karan Johar for Dharma Productions and starred Varun Dhawan and Alia Bhatt. The film was first announced on 3 May 2016 with the release of an online motion poster featuring Dhawan and Bhatt at a local village fair. Principal photography also began on the same day. Some of the scenes were also shot at the Ghatotkach Circle, Kishore Sagar Lake and Seven Wonders Park in Kota, Rajasthan.

== Soundtrack ==
Badrinath Ki Dulhania

Soundtrack album by Amaal Mallik, Tanishk Bagchi and Akhil Sachdeva
- Released: 21 February 2017
- Genre: Feature film soundtrack
- Length: 22:54
- Language: Hindi
- Label: T-Series
- Producer: Hiroo Yash Johar; Karan Johar

The music for the film has been composed by Amaal Mallik, Tanishk Bagchi and Akhil Sachdeva while the lyrics have been written by Kumaar, Shabbir Ahmed, Akhil Sachdeva, Badshah and Indeevar. The soundtrack was released on 21 February 2017 by T-Series.

The song "Humsafar" was originally composed by Akhil Sachdeva. "Tamma Tamma Again" is a recreation of the song "Tamma Tamma" produced by Bappi Lahiri for the 1990 film Thanedaar. In turn, "Tamma Tamma" itself was based on two songs from Mory Kanté's 1987 album Akwaba Beach: "Tama" and "Yé ké yé ké".

The title track "Badri Ki Dulhania" appears to be inspired by the song "Chalat Musafir" from the film Teesri Kasam (1966), which in turn was inspired by a Bihari folk song. Arijit Singh won the Best Playback Singer (Male) in the Filmfare Awards 2018 for his rendition of the song "Roke Na Ruke Naina".

Track listing
No.	Title	Lyrics	Music	Singer(s)	Length
1.	"Aashiq Surrender Hua"	Shabbir Ahmed	Amaal Mallik	Amaal Mallik, Shreya Ghoshal	4:10
2.	"Roke Na Ruke Naina"	Kumaar	Amaal Mallik	Arijit Singh	4:39
3.	"Humsafar"	Akhil Sachdeva	Akhil Sachdeva	Akhil Sachdeva, Mansheel Gujral	4:29
4.	"Badri Ki Dulhania (Title Track)"	Shabbir Ahmed	Tanishk Bagchi	Dev Negi, Neha Kakkar, Monali Thakur, Ikka	3:27
5.	"Tamma Tamma Again"	Badshah, Indeevar	Tanishk Bagchi, Bappi Lahiri	Bappi Lahiri, Anuradha Paudwal, Badshah, Ameen Sayani	3:19
6.	"Humsafar" (Alia's Version)	Akhil Sachdeva	Akhil Sachdeva	Alia Bhatt, Akhil Sachdeva	2:50
Total length:					22:54

== Critical reception ==
The film received generally positive reviews, with the review aggregation website Rotten Tomatoes giving a rating of 80%, based on ten reviews.

Nihit Bhave from Times of India rated the film 3.5/5 and stated "Badrinath Ki Dulhania is a rucksack full of radioactive social issues handled cautiously". He also praised Varun Dhawan and Alia Bhat's chemistry saying, "Together, Varun Dhawan and Alia Bhatt are the best thing that could have happened to our screens". Rohit Vats from Hindustan Times gave film 2.5/5 and noted that Varun Dhawan by portraying a Jhansi boy, reminds of Govinda. Shubhra Gupta from The Indian Express gave film 3/5 saying, "Alia Bhatt is pitch-perfect as dulhania with a mind of her own. Varun Dhawan impresses as a boy-struggling-to-be-a-man. Together, they offer us a flavourful romance which takes down patriarchy." Tushar Joshi from DNA India described the film as light, entertaining and likeable. He writes, "Varun Dhawan and Alia Bhatt prove that on screen chemistry can be enough sometimes to keep you engaged in an average plot with a predictable narrative". Anupama Chopra of Film Companion gave the film 3 out of 5 stars and said, "Think of Badrinath ki Dulhania as a dose of feminism-lite. I was smiling through the film. ...Varun excels as Badri. He has an earnestness that connects instantly. He captures each nuance of Badri – his longing for Vaidehi, his confusion and hurt and the eventual transformation of his rage into understanding and respect." Raja Sen of Rediff gave the film 3 out of 5 stars and said, "What makes Badrinath Ki Dulhania work, really, is the intent and the two principal actors." Rajeev Masand of CNN-IBN gave 2.5 stars out of 5, commenting "Writer-director Shashank Khaitan evidently bites off more than he can chew. Badrinath Ki Dulhania isn’t merely interested in being a breezy rom-com. Admirably, it’s also a critique on the dowry system, and makes a strong case for a woman’s right to choose career over marriage. Unfortunately some of this is communicated in a tone that’s too heavy-handed, and as a result you’re easily bored."

== Box office ==
Badrinath Ki Dulhania netted ₹12.25 crore in India on its opening day. On the second and third day, it earned ₹14.75 crore and ₹16.05 crore nett, taking total opening weekend domestic nett collection to ₹43.05 crore. The film grossed ₹73.66 crore nett domestically in its opening week. It netted ₹27.08 crore in its second week, in which it had entered the 100 Crore Club, taking two weeks total nett collection at ₹100.74 crore. The film's lifetime gross collection domestically was ₹162 crore (including a nett total of ₹117.83 crore) and lifetime gross collection in overseas markets was ₹44.85 crore, thus making a worldwide total collection of ₹206 crore.

== Awards and nominations ==
Date of ceremony	Award	Category	Recipient(s) and nominee(s)	Result	Ref.
4 December 2017	Star Screen Awards	Best Actor in a Comic Role	Varun Dhawan	Won	
4 December 2017	Star Screen Awards	Best Actor – Male (Popular)	Varun Dhawan	Nominated	
4 December 2017	Star Screen Awards	Best Actor – Female (Popular)	Alia Bhatt	Nominated	
4 December 2017	Star Screen Awards	Best Film	Badrinath Ki Dulhania	Nominated	
4 December 2017	Star Screen Awards	Best Director	Shashank Khaitan	Nominated	
30 December 2017	Zee Cine Awards	Best Actor – Male (Jury's Choice)	Varun Dhawan	Won	
30 December 2017	Zee Cine Awards	Best Actor – Female (Viewer's Choice)	Alia Bhatt	Won	
30 December 2017	Zee Cine Awards	Best Actor – Female (Jury's Choice)	Alia Bhatt	Nominated	
30 December 2017	Zee Cine Awards	Best Sound Design	Sohel Sanwari	Won	
30 December 2017	Zee Cine Awards	Best Playback Singer (Male)	Akhil Sachdeva (for the song "Humsafar")	Won	
30 December 2017	Zee Cine Awards	Best Lyrics	Akhil Sachdeva (for the song "Humsafar")	Nominated	
30 December 2017	Zee Cine Awards	Best Film (Viewer's Choice)	Shashank Khaitan	Nominated	
30 December 2017	Zee Cine Awards	Song of the Year (Viewer's Choice)	"Tamma Tamma Again"	Nominated	
30 December 2017	Zee Cine Awards	Best Music	Akhil Sachdeva, Amaal Malik, Tanishk Bagchi, Bappi Lahiri	Nominated	
30 December 2017	Stardust Awards	Best Actor In A Comic Role	Varun Dhawan	Nominated	
30 December 2017	Stardust Awards	Best Actor – Female (Viewer's Choice)	Alia Bhatt	Won	
30 December 2017	Stardust Awards	Best Actor – Female (Jury's Choice)	Alia Bhatt	Nominated	
30 December 2017	Stardust Awards	Best Sound Design	Sohel Sanwari	Won	
30 December 2017	Stardust Awards	Best Playback Singer (Male)	Dev Negi (for the song "Badri Ki Dulhania")	Nominated	
30 December 2017	Stardust Awards	Best Lyrics	Dev Negi (for the song "Badri Ki Dulhania")	Nominated	
30 December 2017	Stardust Awards	Best Film (Viewer's Choice)	Shashank Khaitan	Nominated	
30 December 2017	Stardust Awards	Best Jodi	Alia Bhatt and Varun Dhawan	Won	
30 December 2017	Stardust Awards	Best Music	Akhil Sachdeva, Amaal Malik, Tanishk Bagchi, Bappi Lahiri, Dev Negi, Ikka Singh, Badshah	Won	
20 January 2018	Filmfare Awards	Best Film	Badrinath Ki Dulhania	Nominated	
20 January 2018	Filmfare Awards	Best Director	Shashank Khaitan	Nominated	
20 January 2018	Filmfare Awards	Best Actor	Varun Dhawan	Nominated	
20 January 2018	Filmfare Awards	Best Actress	Alia Bhatt	Nominated	
20 January 2018	Filmfare Awards	Best Music Album	Akhil Sachdeva, Amaal Mallik, Tanishk Bagchi	Nominated	
20 January 2018	Filmfare Awards	Best Playback Singer (Male)	Akhil Sachdeva (for the song "Humsafar")	Nominated	
20 January 2018	Filmfare Awards	Best Playback Singer (Male)	Arijit Singh (for the song "Roke Na Ruke Naina")	Won	
20 January 2018	Filmfare Awards	Best Choreography	Ganesh Acharya (for the song "Badri Ki Dulhania")	Nominated	
28 January 2018	Mirchi Music Awards	Song of The Year	"Aashiq Surrender Hua"	Nominated	
28 January 2018	Mirchi Music Awards	Song of The Year	"Roke Na Ruke Naina"	Nominated	
28 January 2018	Mirchi Music Awards	Male Vocalist of The Year	Arijit Singh (for the song "Roke Na Ruke Naina")	Nominated	
28 January 2018	Mirchi Music Awards	Female Vocalist of The Year	Monali Thakur and Neha Kakkar (for the song "Badri Ki Dulhania")	Nominated	
28 January 2018	Mirchi Music Awards	Music Composer of The Year	Amaal Mallik (for the song "Aashiq Surrender Hua")	Nominated	
28 January 2018	Mirchi Music Awards	Best Song Engineer (Recording & Mixing)	Eric Pillai, Shantanu Hudlikar, Abhishek Khandelwal & Manasi Tare (for the song "Roke Na Ruke Naina")	Nominated	
20 March 2018	News18 Reel Movie Awards	Best Music	Akhil Sachdeva, Amaal Malik, Tanishk Bagchi, Bappi Lahiri	Nominated	
20 March 2018	News18 Reel Movie Awards	Best Playback Singer (Male)	Arijit Singh (for the song "Roke Na Ruke Naina")	Nominated	
20 March 2018	News18 Reel Movie Awards	Best Playback Singer (Male)	Akhil Sachdeva (for the song "Humsafar")	Nominated	
22 June 2018	International Indian Film Academy Awards	Best Actress	Alia Bhatt	Nominated	
22 June 2018	International Indian Film Academy Awards	Best Music Direction	Akhil Sachdeva, Amaal Malik, Tanishk Bagchi, Bappi Lahiri	Won	
