= Santosh Srinivas =

Indian film director

- Born: 18 July 1980 (age 45); Visakhapatnam, Andhra Pradesh, India
- Occupations: Film director and cinematographer

Santosh Srinivas Rowthu is an Indian director, screenwriter, and cinematographer who works in Telugu cinema. He directed Kandireega which featured Ram Pothineni in lead role.

== Early life and career ==
Santosh was born and brought up in Visakhapatnam. He completed his schooling and graduation in Visakhapatnam.

He started his career as a cinematographer. He worked as cinematographer for films that include Khatarnak, Takkari, Rainbow. he made his directorial debut in 2011 with Kandireega starring Ram Pothineni and Hansika Motwani. Later he started Rabhasa featuring N. T. Rama Rao Jr and Samantha Ruth Prabhu in lead roles.

== Filmography ==
Year	Film	Credits	Source
2006	Khatarnak	Cinematography	
2007	Takkari	Cinematography	
2008	Rainbow	Cinematography	
2011	Kandireega	Director and Writer	
2014	Rabhasa	Director and Writer	
2016	Hyper	Director and Writer	
2021	Alludu Adhurs	Director and Writer	
