= Main Tera Hero =

2014 Indian film by David Dhawan

- Theatrical release poster
- Directed by: David Dhawan
- Screenplay by: Tushar Hiranandani
- Dialogues by: Milap Zaveri
- Story by: Tushar Hiranandani; Anil Ravipudi; Santosh Srinivas
- Based on: Kandireega by Santosh Srinivas
- Produced by: Shobha Kapoor; Ekta Kapoor
- Starring: Varun Dhawan; Ileana D'Cruz; Nargis Fakhri
- Narrated by: Salman Khan
- Cinematography: Sanjay F. Gupta
- Edited by: Nitin Rokade
- Music by: Songs: Sajid–Wajid; Score: Sandeep Shirodkar
- Production company: Balaji Motion Pictures
- Release date: April 4, 2014 (India)
- Running time: 128 minutes
- Country: India
- Language: Hindi
- Box office: ₹78 crore

Main Tera Hero (transl. I am your hero) is a 2014 Indian Hindi-language romantic comedy film directed by David Dhawan, with script and dialogues from Tushar Hiranandani and Milap Zaveri, and produced by Shobha Kapoor and Ekta Kapoor under Balaji Motion Pictures. The film stars Varun Dhawan, alongside Ileana D'Cruz, Nargis Fakhri, Arunoday Singh, Anupam Kher, Rajpal Yadav and Shakti Kapoor. The movie is a remake of 2011 Telugu movie Kandireega.

Principal photography began on 30 May 2013. The filming began on 5 July 2013 and was wrapped by 15 October 2013. The soundtrack and score were composed by Sajid–Wajid and Sandeep Shirodkar, while cinematography and editing were handled by Sanjay F. Gupta and Nitin Rokade.

Main Tera Hero was released on 4 April 2014 to mixed-to-positive reviews from critics and became a commercial success at the box office. Even so, the film acquired a cult status over the years, leading to a successful re-release in 2026.

== Plot ==
Across a college in Ooty, Sreenath Prasad aka 'Seenu' fails his final exam by two marks. Eager to get a degree, he kidnaps the professor's daughter during her wedding and demands his professor to give him two more marks in exchange for his daughter. Seenu accidentally lets go of her however while letting his parents into his house, and his plan fails.

Although Seenu's father offers him a job at his shopping mall, Seenu plans to get a degree at Tift College in Bengaluru. He leaves Ooty on a train headed for Bengaluru. On the train, he beats up a gang harming a group of teenage girls. When Seenu arrives in Bengaluru, a friend of his who lives there reluctantly allows him to stay in his house.

Once Seenu arrives in Tift College, he prays to Krishna to concentrate on nothing but studies. However, once he finishes, he sees a Middle - Class girl named Sunaina Goradia and gets attracted to her. He tries to get her attention, but she ignores him constantly. She tells him that she has been forced into marrying a corrupt policeman named Angad Negi since he tricked her father into shooting Angad's sidekick and friend Peter's arm. Angad's men chase Seenu until he beats up two of them and scares away the rest. Seenu goes to Angad to make a truce with him and leave Sunaina, but Angad (believing he cannot do it) gives Seenu a chance to try to woo Sunaina for up to three days. Seenu publicly tells Sunaina he loves her and tells her not to be afraid of Angad and his goons. She gains courage, scares off Angad's men, and falls in love with Seenu. Angad finds Seenu, finds out what happened, and attempts to shoot Seenu, but instead accidentally shoots Peter. The media quickly finds out and Angad gets suspended as a police officer.

All seems well until Sunaina is kidnapped and taken away in a helicopter. Seenu learns from Angad that Sunaina will be taken to the mansion of Vikrant Singhal one of Asia's most notorious gangsters. Vikrant's daughter, Ayesha Singhal was on the Ooty-to-Bangalore train Seenu was in and was attracted by his impressive fighting skills. She told her father about the experience as well as her interest in marrying him. Angad and Peter told Vikrant's men that in order to get Seenu, they would have to take Sunaina to lure him to their place, forcing Seenu to marry Ayesha.

Feeling helpless, Seenu goes to Vikrant's residence in Bangkok, Thailand. He tricks Vikrant and his friend and associate Balli into thinking that he wants to marry Ayesha. However, he requests that he is given ten days to get to know Ayesha before the wedding day, which Vikrant initially refuses until Ayesha tells her father to "do as Seenu says". Ayesha and Seenu spend the day together; later, Seenu tells Ayesha that he does not love her. Later When Seenu met Sunaina and Try to Intimate with her she asks him to leave the house, but Fails. When Angad and Peter come later, she then falls in love with Angad through a sheer coincidence. Seenu Likes Ayesha As Wells he Likes Sunaina and never show differences.

Seenu and Sunaina use Ayesha's love for Angad as a way of solving their problem. Sunaina wears identical clothes to Ayesha; as a result, Angad confuses Sunaina for Ayesha, making Ayesha believe that Angad loves her. The plan later fails, though, when Angad realizes this and tricks Ayesha once again into marrying Seenu. Angad is tricked by Seenu and Sunaina into kissing Ayesha, when Vikrant sees this and points his gun at Angad to shoot him, but Ayesha steps in between and stops him saying that she loves Angad. Seeing this, Angad realizes that Ayesha's love for him is true and that Ayesha is the right girl for him, not Sunaina and decides to marry Ayesha. Vikrant realizes his daughter loves Angad and reluctantly tells Seenu that Ayesha will marry Angad. Seenu pretends to have agonized but celebrates later. Ayesha marries Angad, and Vikrant convinces Sunaina (who is also pretending to hate Seenu) to marry Seenu, by saying that he took 10 days to hatch a plan to bring Ayesha and Angad together, not to get to know Ayesha (not realizing that this is true) Seenu and Sunaina are back together again and get married.

== Cast ==
- Varun Dhawan as Shrinath Prasad a.k.a. "Seenu"
- Ileana D'Cruz as Sunaina Goradia
- Nargis Fakhri as Ayesha Singhal
- Arunoday Singh as Inspector Angad Negi
- Anupam Kher as Vikrant Singhal
- Rajpal Yadav as Peter
- Saurabh Shukla as Balli
- Manoj Pahwa as Sinu's father
- Supriya Shukla as Sinu's mother
- Evelyn Sharma as Veronica
- Raju Kher as Professor Tripathi
- Neel Motwani as Angad's Goon
- Shakti Kapoor as Johnny
- Ashwin Mushran as Anger Management Therapist
- Kavish Majumdar as Sinu's college friend
- Salman Khan in a voiceover appearance as Various Gods; including Ganesha, Krishna, and Jesus

== Production ==
=== Development ===
Ekta Kapoor producer confirmed her big budget movie in January 2013 as she bought the rights for her next venture from the Telugu film Kandireega for ₹20 million (US$210,000). Production team wants the movie to capture it as a modern-day Himmatwala with a treatment like The Wedding Crashers. Nargis Fakhri dubbed in her own voice over for the first time in a Hindi language film which was stopping her due to language barriers.

=== Casting ===
Balaji Motion Pictures approached Varun Dhawan, Ileana D'Cruz and Nargis Fakhri as the main leads for the film and it was confirmed.

=== Filming ===
Initial filming began on 5 July 2013, the filming locations include Bangalore, Bangkok and London. Next schedule commenced in Bangkok October 2013 with the main cast. Number of songs for the movie has been choreographed by Bosco-Caesar in Bangkok. Anupam Kher was seen alongside main cast in a supporting role.

== Soundtrack ==
The soundtrack was composed by Sajid–Wajid, while the lyrics were penned by Kumaar, Kausar Munir and Danish Sabri. The soundtrack was released on 3 March 2014. The producers of the film capitulating on the popularity of the song "Palat – Tera Hero Idhar Hai" from the soundtrack attached a remix version of it along with the theatrical prints of Ragini MMS 2, which released on 21 March 2014—instead of the theatrical trailer—marking the first such instance.

== Marketing ==
The film's official trailer was released online on 23 January 2014 with presence of the main cast. Positive responses came along for the young stars' vibe and one of the tabloid reviews compared the movie to Archie Comics characters. Arise India and PVR Cinemas collaborated to bring the star-cast of Main Tera Hero to the initial screening at MGF Metropolitan Mall in Saket, Delhi.

Promotional events for the film took place in various cities. As a part of the tour, the cast visited many colleges, malls, and news channels to promote their film. The cast made appearances at colleges and malls in Indore and then touring New Delhi, turned up at Delhi University's campus which saw thousands of youngsters turn up to see actors Varun Dhawan, Ileana D'Cruz and anchor Bharat Jain. They have reportedly disheartened at Nargis Fakhri's absence as she was shooting in Budapest.

== Reception ==
On review aggregator website Rotten Tomatoes, the film holds an approval rating of 20% based on 5 reviews, and an average rating of 5/10.

Taran Adarsh of Bollywood Hungama gave the movie 3.5/5 stars and wrote, "On the whole, MAIN TERA HERO is a wild, wacky, madcap entertainer that has the unmistakable stamp of the master of entertainers – David Dhawan. An over the top plot, humor quotient and performances are three aces the film stands on. The film should work well with admirers of typical Bollywood masalathons, also because Varun Dhawan pulls off the act with flamboyance and bowls you over with an uproarious act in this zany entertainer. Go, have fun and laugh out loud!" Srijana Mitra Das of Times of India gave the movie 3.5/5 stars saying, Main Tera Hero is a pav bhaji picture, quick, spicy, hot. It has the depth of a comic strip but it also has its neon-shaded fun. For those who want a light laugh, here's your boy. Paloma Sharma of Rediff gave the movie 3.5/5 stars, and wrote, Main Tera Hero rests almost solely on the bases of strong performances extracted by a tough taskmaster, director David Dhawan—who makes a surprisingly clean film for the most part but doesn't seem to have been able to resist the temptation to indulge in a few less-than-tasteful jokes post-interval. The second half is primarily where the problem lies. The script dwindles slightly. Too many characters with too many subplots emerge, messing things up for a bit. Film Critic Subhash K. Jha gave the film 3 stars, saying ""Main Tera Hero" is a cleverly designed blues-chaser...While Varun Dhawan goes about the task of filling up the screen with his confident zest, David Dhawan ensures there is enough fuel to furnish the funnies with a furious tempo".

Mohar Basu of Koimoi praised the film, stating that, "Main Tero Hero transports you into a world of fun that we have been kept devoid of from weeks. Quick witted, jocular and pricelessly silly, this film is a sure shot must watch." She gave the film 3 out of 5 stars. Raedita Tandan of Filmfare rated the movie with 3 stars stating, "Main Tera Hero (MTH) is a textbook David Dhawan movie. This is the kind of low-brow humour you enjoy without pretensions. It's not great cinema but it is a paisa vasool comedy." Sarita Tanwar of DNA gave the movie 3/5 stars and said, "Main Tera Hero is a light-hearted entertainer, under two hours long which moves along at a brisk pace. Tushar Hiranandani has penned a mad script that will reel you in as soon as the credits end. If the industry was looking for a replacement for Govinda, then there isn't a better option than Varun." Saibal Chatterjee of NDTV gave the movie 2.5/5 stars and said that "Main Tera Hero is an action-packed romantic comedy that is peppered with vivacious performances, peppy musical set pieces, and a breezy and an unusual love triangle that eventually acquires an additional angle. The story, which is clearly only a pretext to hang the film's many gags on, delivers frantic twists and turns that strain credulity." Zee News Aparna Mudi, rated the movie 2.5/5 stars, stating, "The cast of the movie have definitely been given leverage to play their characters with ease, and performances are good all around. They also seem to have had a lot of fun with the movie, especially Varun, as he looks adorable pulling faces and romancing the two lead heroines. Highly entertaining in the first half, 'Main Tera Hero' slumps in the second. The jokes are slightly in-your-face and fail to make you laugh at times."

Abhishek Gupta of India TV gave it 2.5 stars and wrote, "Twists and turns in the climax look forcibly inducted to give a feeling of suspense, though, it doesn't work at all. The cop and the Don turning into comic characters were expected from it but despite all these hiccups, Main Tera Hero reaches its destination." The Hindustan Times' Anupama Chopra gave the film 2 stars, saying, "There are a few moments in the film that took me back to the good old day. But mostly, Main Tera Hero is loud and tiring. The frenzied plot didn't deliver enough funny lines. The burden of making this enterprise work rests mostly with Varun, who is as hyper as a helium-filled energizer bunny. Meanwhile, the two svelte heroines – Ileana D'Cruz and Nargis Fakhri – simper about looking sexy. I just wish it had been more interesting". India Today gave the film 2 stars: "If this film was made to establish Varun Dhawan as a comedy actor who can do something different then they have achieved what they wanted. Because he does put a great show together but there is absolutely nothing else that deserves any compliments."

== Box office ==
Main Tera Hero opened to an occupancy of around 40% in India. The film, which released alongside Captain America: The Winter Soldier, led in the morning shows in places like Rajasthan, Gujarat and CI while lost out to it in multiplexes of Kolkata, Delhi, Bangalore, Chennai and Mumbai. The film saw a major setback during evening shows in the first day of its release owing to the semi-final match between India and South-Africa collecting ₹20 crore (US$2.1 million). The film collected another ₹27.9 crore (US$3.0 million) on the second day of its theatrical release—taking its two-day total to ₹50 crore (US$5.3 million)—showing a considerable growth of 80%, which was expected considering the loss on its first day to the cricket match. On the third day it collected ₹75 million (US$800,000)—₹7.75 crore (US$830,000) to take its weekend total to ₹40 crore (US$4.3 million)—₹40.3 crore (US$4.3 million) which though "high" by normal standards were understandable because of the cricket matches affecting its growth. On its first Monday it had a collection of around ₹37.5 crore (US$4.0 million)—₹43.6 crore (US$4.7 million). On the fifth day of its theatrical release there was a growth of 15% courtesy a holiday, another ₹2.75 crore (US$290,000) on the next day pushed the film's six-day total to ₹30.8 crore (US$3.3 million). Overall the film had a decent first week collecting ₹33.5 crore (US$3.6 million) domestically. The film with the fourth highest first week total of the year—after Jai Ho, Gunday and Ragini MMS 2—performed best in circuits like CP Berar, Nizam and Andhra Pradesh, where it collected an estimated ₹22.1 crore (US$2.4 million) plus and above all in Gujarat with ₹40 crore (US$4.3 million). Suffering a heavy drop of 75% the film collected ₹1.5 crore (US$160,000) on its eighth day. The film in all collected ₹12.8 crore (US$1.4 million) in its second week managing a two-week total of ₹46.3 crore (US$4.9 million) with best collections from Mumbai, Rajasthan and CP Berar circuits. From the Mumbai circuit—comprising the Gujarat-Saurashtra belts—alone it collected ₹18 crore (US$1.9 million). It was declared a "Semi Hit" by Box Office India.
