= Humpty Sharma Ki Dulhania =

2014 Indian film by Shashank Khaitan

- Theatrical release poster
- Directed by: Shashank Khaitan
- Written by: Shashank Khaitan
- Produced by: Hiroo Yash Johar; Karan Johar
- Starring: Varun Dhawan; Alia Bhatt; Sidharth Shukla; Ashutosh Rana
- Cinematography: Neha Parti Matiyani
- Edited by: Manan Ajay Sagar
- Music by: Songs: Sachin–Jigar; Sharib-Toshi; The Titans; Badshah; Jawad Ahmed; Score: John Stewart Eduri
- Production company: Dharma Productions
- Distributed by: AA Films (India); Reliance Entertainment (Overseas)
- Release date: 11 July 2014
- Running time: 135 minutes
- Country: India
- Language: Hindi
- Budget: ₹33 crore
- Box office: ₹119.58 crore

Humpty Sharma Ki Dulhania (transl. Humpty Sharma's bride) is a 2014 Indian Hindi-language romantic comedy film written and directed by Shashank Khaitan in his debut and produced by Dharma Productions. It stars Varun Dhawan, Alia Bhatt and debutante Sidharth Shukla.

It is the first installment of the Dulhania franchise. Humpty Sharma Ki Dulhania was released theatrically on 11 July 2014. It became a box office success and had a worldwide gross of ₹119 crore. A quasi-sequel titled Badrinath Ki Dulhania was released in 2017.

== Plot ==
Kavya Pratap Singh, a beautiful, educated, and stylish Punjabi girl from Ambala who is set to be engaged to an NRI American doctor, decides to go to Delhi to buy an expensive designer bridal dress for her wedding, after her father, Kamaljeet, refuses to get her the pricey dress. While staying at her maternal uncle's house, she comes across one of his students, Rakesh "Humpty" Kumar Sharma, a young and flirtatious Punjabi boy in Delhi, whose father, Vinod Kumar Sharma, runs a stationery shop. Humpty, with the help of his friends, Shonty and Poplu, chases Kavya, but she's not interested. He, however, manages to befriend her. Kavya confides in Humpty, that her friend in Delhi, Gurpreet Sodhi, was blackmailed by her ex-boyfriend, who had secretly filmed a sex sequence between the two.

Humpty stumbles upon an idea for victimizing Gurpreet's ex-boyfriend, who would also avenge Gurpreet and gather the money for the wedding dress for Kavya. They manage to get some money but Kavya isn't happy about how that is obtained. However, these ensuing adventures make Kavya fall for Humpty, and the night before she is to leave for Ambala, they end up having sex. When Humpty asks her if she loves him, she affirms it but she says that she doesn't want to go against Kamaljeet's wishes, as she reveals that her elder sister, Swati, married Param against her father's wishes and the relationship turned out to be a disaster ending in divorce, which is why her father believes firmly in arranged marriages against love marriages. To help Humpty get the money for Kavya's dress, Vinod, Poplu, and Shonty chip in their savings. Kavya reluctantly accepts the money and leaves Delhi.

Kavya is a changed person when she arrives home. She tells her family that she has decided not to buy that expensive dress. In the meantime, she gifts a fancy car to Humpty using that money, as she had known from him about Vinod's dream of a car. Overwhelmed, Humpty and his friends go to Ambala, where he tries to win over Kavya. Eventually, Kavya does fall in love with him but Kamaljeet still instantly disapproves of Humpty and gets the three friends beaten up. Upon repeated persuasion, he gives Humpty a chance to find at least one reason why Angad is incompatible for Kavya. He sets him a five-day deadline to give him the reason. Humpty and his friends try their best to find flaws in Angad but fail to do so.

At the end of the deadline and on her wedding day, Kavya runs away from home and calls Humpty to join her on a train to leave town, but which he refuses and convinces Kavya to get off the train. Meanwhile, Kamaljeet and the rest of the family reach the train station, where Kavya and Humpty embrace each other. Kamaljeet, wrongly assuming the pair was eloping, is enraged and hits Humpty, who gives a powerful and touching explanation, saying that he may not be as rich, successful, or good-looking as Angad but loves Kavya from the core of his heart and while also clarifying that just because Angad is perfect for Kavya doesn't necessarily mean that she will be happy with him. He leaves Ambala and heads back to Delhi after that incident.

When Kavya is dressed up as a bride, Kamaljeet asks her if she still fancies that expensive wedding dress. She replies that she's not fit for expensive, classy dresses and is suitable for local dresses. Eventually, Kamaljeet also realizes that her relationship would be fuller with Humpty rather than Angad, so he brings everyone to Delhi, where he approaches Humpty and gives his consent to marry his daughter.

== Cast ==
- Varun Dhawan as Rakesh "Humpty" Kumar Sharma
- Alia Bhatt as Kavya Pratap Singh
- Sidharth Shukla as Angad Bedi
- Ashutosh Rana as Kamaljeet Pratap Singh
- Aditya Sharma as Ranjeet Pratap Singh
- Deepika Amin as Meher Pratap Singh
- Mahnaz Damania as Swati Pratap Singh
- Gaurav Pandey as Shonty
- Sahil Vaid as Poplu
- Kenny Desai as Vinod Kumar Sharma
- Guncha Narula as Gurpreet Sodhi, Kavya's friend
- Shivani Mahajan as Mrs. Chibber, Humpty's teacher

== Development and release ==
In August 2013, Dharma Productions confirmed that Varun Dhawan, Alia Bhatt, and Sidharth Shukla would be portraying the main leads. This was the second time the pair would be seen together after their debut film, Student of the Year, directed by Karan Johar. Johar in a press conference said that the film is a tribute to the cult romantic classic Dilwale Dulhaniya Le Jayenge.

Filming took place in Mumbai with a second schedule completed on 12 March in Punjab. Filming took place in Vaseela in March 2014 with more planned for Ambala and Chandigarh. The filming was completed in Ambala, Chandigarh, Khan Market and Delhi University, at a budget of ₹17.5 crore (US$1.8 million).

The song "Saturday Saturday" was filmed in Mumbai Film City recreating the Colosseum for a futuristic avatar song with Om Prakash as the director of photography and with Ahmed Khan as the choreographer.

Humpty Sharma Ki Dulhania's teaser trailer was released along with 2 States (also starring Bhatt), which was released on 18 April 2014.

== Soundtrack ==
The film's soundtrack is composed by Sachin–Jigar and Shaarib-Toshi with lyrics penned by Kumaar, Irshad Kamil and Shashank Khaitan.

The song "Saturday Saturday" was the first single track released, which was originally composed by The Titans, Badshah and recreated by Sharib-Toshi. The song "Samjhawan" was originally taken from 2010 Punjabi film Virsa and recreated by Sharib-Toshi, with vocals by Arijit Singh and Shreya Ghoshal. The second single track "Mein Tenu Samjhawan Ki" is sung by actress Alia Bhatt while lyrics have been given by lyricist Kumaar. DJ Chetas composed The Humpty Mashup also known as Humpty Sharma Ki Dulhania Mashup.

== Awards ==
Stardust Awards 2014

- Stardust Award for Breakthrough Performance – Male – Sidharth Shukla
- Best Actor (Romance / Comedy) – Varun Dhawan
- Best Actress (Romance/Comedy) – Alia Bhatt

7th Mirchi Music Awards

- Male Vocalist of The Year – Arijit Singh – "Samjhawan"
- Female Vocalist of The Year – Shreya Ghoshal – "Samjhawan"
- Song representing Sufi tradition – "Samjhawan"

== Future installments ==
In May 2016, it was announced that Khaitan would write and direct another romantic comedy under the Dharma Productions banner with Dhawan and Bhatt playing the lead roles. Although the two films will have different plots and characters, the film is considered the second installment in the Dulhania franchise that began with Humpty Sharma Ki Dulhania. The second installment, titled Badrinath Ki Dulhania, was released on 10 March 2017.
