= Kandireega =

2011 Indian film by Santosh Srinivas

- Theatrical release poster
- Directed by: Santosh Srinivas
- Written by: Santosh Srinivas
- Produced by: Bellamkonda Suresh
- Starring: Ram Pothineni; Hansika Motwani; Sonu Sood; Aksha Pardasany
- Cinematography: I. Andrew
- Edited by: Kotagiri Venkateswara Rao
- Music by: S. Thaman
- Production companies: Sri Sai Ganesh Productions and Multidimension Entertainments Private Limited
- Release date: 12 August 2011
- Running time: 160 minutes
- Country: India
- Language: Telugu
- Box office: ₹22 crore distributors' share

Kandireega (transl. Wasp) is a 2011 Indian Telugu-language romantic action comedy film directed by Santosh Srinivas and produced by Bellamkonda Suresh under Sri Sai Ganesh Productions. The film stars Ram Pothineni, Hansika Motwani, Sonu Sood and Aksha Pardasany with the music scored by S. Thaman. Released on 12 August 2011, the film was a commercial success, collecting a distributor share of ₹22 crore at the box office. It was remade in Bengali as Paglu 2 and Hindi as Main Tera Hero (2014). It was later dubbed into Hindi as Dangerous Khiladi 4.

== Plot ==
Sreenu is the son of Viswanatham. He is a high school dropout in Anakapalli and wants to marry his uncle's daughter Bujji. She rejects him, stating that he doesn't have a basic college education. Sreenu, who is clever and street-smart, decides to go to Hyderabad for further education. While traveling on the train, he bashes up a bunch of rowdies teasing college girls. At the college in Hyderabad, he meets Sruthi and falls in love with her. The city gangster, Bhavani is attack in love with her and blackmails her into marrying him. He beats action Sreenu anyone moving gets angry Bhavani, closely with Sruthi. Meanwhile, his henchmen of Rajanna, a dreaded chieftain from Warangal, are looking for Sreenu in the city.

Sreenu meets Bhavani and forces him to a challenge, whereby, he will make Sruthi love him. Sreenu rescues Sruthi from being kidnapped by the gang of Yadayya, a rival of Bhavani. When Sreenu wins Sruthi's heart, and both of them decide to elope, she is kidnapped.

It is then revealed that Rajanna kidnapped Sruthi to get hold of Sreenu because Rajanna's daughter Sandhya is in love with Sreenu. She was on the train during the night and gets impressed by him. Sreenu lands at Rajanna's place and finds himself in a fix. Bhavani, too, arrives at Rajanna's place to take away Sruthi. What happens forms the rest of the story.

== Cast ==
- Ram Pothineni as Kandireega/Sreenu
- Hansika Motwani as Sruthi
- Sonu Sood as Bhavani
- Aksha Pardasany as Sandhya
- Giri Babu as Krishna Rao, Kandireega's father
- Chandra Mohan as Viswanatham, Sreenu's father
- Jaya Prakash Reddy as Rajanna, Sandhya's father
- Sudha as Janaki, Sandhya's mother
- Suhasini Maniratnam as Snehalatha, Kandireega's mother
- Sumithra as Amrutham, Sreenu's mother
- M. S. Narayana as Narayana, Sreenu's uncle
- Dharmavarapu Subramanyam as Subramanyam, Sreenu's uncle
- Srinivasa Reddy as Sreenu's friend
- Raghu Babu as Intelligence Officer Avataram
- Saptagiri as Giri
- Fish Venkat as Chintu
- Sana as Lakshmi, Sruthi's mother
- Y. Kasi Viswanath as Srinivas, Sruthi's father
- Pragathi as Lalita, Sreenu's aunt
- Hema as Sujatha, Sreenu's aunt
- Rama Prabha as Subbammatta
- Brahmaji as Basava
- Praveen as Sathya, Sreenu's friend
- Brahmanandam as Bhavani (cameo appearance)
- Swati Reddy as Bujji (guest appearance)

== Production ==
This film was initially announced in October 2009 with Ravi Teja playing the lead role and with Krishna Vamsi as director, with the producer announcing the film as a partly fantasy venture. The film progressed in pre-production with Tamannaah Bhatia and Sneha Ullal being considered to portray the heroine role, whilst the fantasy elements in the original script were removed. In April 2010, it was revealed that the producer and Ravi Teja had fallen out and he was replaced by Ram. The filming began in October 2010 with Ram and Hansika Motwani, whilst actress Swati Reddy shot scenes the following month. Ram stated on his Twitter account that the film had three female lead roles, and suggested that Nisha Aggarwal was signed on.

During the first schedule, events on the set of the film became the reason for the Telugu film industry strikes of 2010 after Telugu film fighters attacked Tamil film technicians in Chennai on the sets of the film in December 2009. Enraged by this, producers called for a bandh the next day. However, film workers declared a strike immediately after that for an indefinite period. The crisis affected the whole film industry, and no films were shot in Andhra Pradesh during late December and early January while negotiations.

After filming had resumed, the original music director Chakri was replaced by S. Thaman in March 2011.

== Soundtrack ==
Kandireega

Soundtrack album by S. Thaman
- Released: 14 July 2011
- Recorded: 2011
- Genre: Feature film soundtrack
- Length: 21:53
- Label: Aditya Music
- Producer: S. Thaman

S. Thaman chronology
Vandhaan Vendraan (2011)	Kandireega (2011)	Dookudu / Power (2011)

Kandireega's audio was launched at Taj Deccan in Hyderabad on 14 July 2011. Venkatesh was the chief guest at the audio launch. Dharmavarapu Subramanyam, T. Gopichand, Bellamkonda Suresh, Santosh Srinivas, V. V. Vinayak, music composer S. S. Thaman, actress Aksha, Sravanti Ravikishore etc. all were present at the grand audio launch. The track "Champakamala" was originally composed for the Mahesh Babu-starrer Dookudu, but later used in Kandireega.

No.	Title	Lyrics	Performer(s)	Length
1.	"Gentleman"	Bhaskarabhatla Ravi Kumar	Ranjith, Chorus	3:17
2.	"Champakamala"	Ramajogayya Sastry	Karthik, Suchitra	4:49
3.	"Nenkudithey"	Bhaskarabhatla Ravi Kumar	Naveen Madhav, M. L. R. Karthikeyan, Aalaap Raju, Ranjith, Ranina Reddy, Dharshana	4:35
4.	"Angelina"	Ramajogayya Sastry	Ranjith, Ranina Reddy, Suchitra	4:14
5.	"Premey"	Ramajogayya Sastry	Ranjith, Hemachandra, Deepu, Revanth Kumar, M. L. R. Karthikeyan, Bindhu Mahima, Geetha Madhuri, Sravana Bhargavi	4:58
Total length:				21:53

== Release ==
The film was theatrically released on 12 August 2011.

=== Home media ===
In a bid to acquire the film, Gemini TV was competing but the rights were acquired by Zee Telugu.

== Reception ==
Jeevi of Idlebrain rated the film 3 out of 5 and stated that "Kandireega is a kind of script that is prepared to cater to comedy and mass elements. It is a mass masala movie with ample entertainment". Echoing the same, The Times of India stated: "Though the story isn’t too original, Kandireega is an out-and-out entertainer that doesn’t leave you bored for even a second".

== Remake ==
The film was remade in Bengali as Paglu 2 (2012), and in Hindi as Main Tera Hero (2014).
