= Desi Boyz =

2011 Indian film by Rohit Dhawan

- Theatrical release poster
- Directed by: Rohit Dhawan
- Written by: Additional Screenplay: Milap Milan Zaveri; Dialogues: Renuka Kunzru
- Screenplay by: Rohit Dhawan
- Story by: Rohit Dhawan
- Produced by: Krishika Lulla; Vijay Ahuja; Jyoti Deshpande
- Starring: Akshay Kumar; John Abraham; Deepika Padukone; Chitrangada Singh; Anupam Kher; Sanjay Dutt
- Cinematography: Natarajan Subramaniam
- Edited by: Nitin Rokade
- Music by: Songs: Pritam; Score: Sandeep Shirodkar
- Production company: Next Gen Films
- Distributed by: Eros International
- Release date: 25 November 2011 (India)
- Running time: 121 minutes
- Country: India
- Language: Hindi
- Budget: ₹65 crore
- Box office: ₹77 crore

Desi Boyz is a 2011 Indian Hindi-language romantic comedy film written and directed by debutant Rohit Dhawan, the son of director David Dhawan. The film stars Akshay Kumar, John Abraham, Deepika Padukone, and Chitrangada Singh with Sanjay Dutt in a guest appearance.

The film was released on 25 November 2011, and received mixed reviews from critics, emerging as a moderate success at the box-office.

== Plot ==
The story follows two friends and roommates, the Gujarati rebel Jignesh 'Jerry' Patel and clean simpleton Nikhil 'Nick' Mathur, who live in London. Jerry does odd jobs for a living as an undergraduate, while Nick has a white-collar job. However, both find themselves jobless due to the economic downturn. Jerry has a school-age nephew named Veer whom he looks after, as the child has lost his parents. Nick intends to marry his girlfriend, Radhika Awasthi, who dreams of a lovely wedding, a great honeymoon, and a wonderful house to live in after marriage.

Out of a job, Jerry finds it difficult even to pay Veer's school fees, which is why the government is on the verge of giving Veer's custody to a foster family; the adoption case is being handled by social service worker Vikrant Mehra, who sympathizes with Jerry but cautions him over his financial situation. Nick fears he won't be able to fulfill the dreams of his to-be wife. It is to tide over the difficult times that Jerry and an initially reluctant Nick become escorts for a company owned by one Mr. Khalnayak, fulfilling the fantasies of girls and ladies. Nonetheless, once their covers are blown, the ill-fated happens: Jerry is unable to prevent Veer from being sent to a foster home, and Nick loses Radhika when she learns of what he has been up to while she is away in India. Frustrated, Nick blames Jerry for forcing him into the profession and asks him to move out of his house and life, thus causing a rift in their friendship.

Nick now tries to win Radhika back, and help comes from the most unlikely source – Radhika's father, Dr. Suresh, a retired gynaecologist, who has come to London with her. Meanwhile, at Vikrant's recommendation, Jerry enrolls in college again to complete his graduation so that he can earn enough money to get Veer's legal custody. While there, Jerry demands an explanation from his economics professor for ousting him without reason when he realizes that she is none other than his former classmate Tanya Sharma, who is now a professor at the same college. Sparks fly between the two. Meanwhile, to make Nick jealous, Radhika dates a man named Ajay. Nick starts to pick on Ajay, often calling him Vijay intentionally. After some reconsideration, Radhika questions Nick, but he instead rejects her after she disapproves of Jerry. Meanwhile, Jerry graduates from college and also wins Tanya's heart. Nick arrives with Jerry's mother and apologizes to him. All is forgiven when Nick and Jerry reconcile. Jerry then helps Radhika win back Nick.

Nick then helps Jerry get a high-paying job, and Jerry decides to go to court and get back Veer's custody. Ajay turns out to be the lawyer against Jerry's side. He decides to get revenge on Nick by not letting Jerry win his case. Ajay tells the court about Jerry being a male escort and what a bad role model he would be to Veer, bringing in 3 witnesses to testify against Jerry. He asks each of them if they had paid Jerry for sex, but only one says yes. Ajay is on the verge of winning, but Mr. Khalnayak comes into the courtroom and influences the judge. Jerry then makes an inspiring speech to the judge. He ends up winning the case and gaining full custody of Veer. The economy improves and everyone is happy in the end; in a short-ending scene, a newspaper article is shown stating that the recession will strike back when Mr. Khalnayak gives a call and says that he has obtained the license for a branch in Mumbai.

== Cast ==
- Akshay Kumar as Jignesh 'Jerry' 'J' Patel a.k.a. Rocco
- John Abraham as Nikhil 'Nick' Mathur a.k.a. Hunter
- Deepika Padukone as Radhika "Rads" Awasthi
- Chitrangada Singh as Tanya Sharma
- Virej Dasani as Veer Patel, Jerry's nephew
- Anupam Kher as Dr. Suresh Awasthi, a retired gynaecologist and Radhika's father
- Omi Vaidya as Ajay Bapat
- Shraman Jain as Rohan, Jerry's roommate and friend
- Bharati Achrekar as Jerry's mother
- Satish Kaushik as Mr. Dhillon
- Ashwin Mushran as Defence Lawyer
- Suparna Marwah as the judge
- Mohnish Bahl in an extended cameo appearance as Vikrant Mehra, a social worker in charge of Veer's adoption case
- Sanjay Dutt in an extended cameo appearance as Mr. Khalnayak
- Bruna Abdullah in a special appearance in the song "Subah Hone Na De"
- Pushtiie Shakti as Natasha, Rocco's second client

== Inspiration ==
Desi Boyz was reported to be inspired by the aftermath of thousands of Indian students being duped by various universities in the West such as Tri Valley University, Herguan University, London Metropolitan University and University of Navarra.

== Production ==
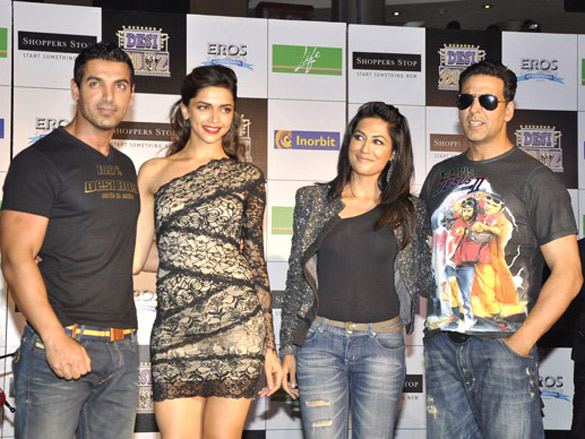
John Abraham, Deepika Padukone, Chitrangada Singh and Akshay Kumar during the Promotions, 2011

Desi Boyz started filming on 7 November 2010, and completed shooting in May 2011. The film was to feature Sonam Kapoor as the lead actress, but she declined the film. There were also rumours of the film being offered to Anushka Sharma, but she denied this. Eventually, Deepika Padukone and Chitrangada Singh were finalised as the female leads. This marks the second collaboration of Kumar and Abraham after Garam Masala. Padukone was seen opposite John Abraham for the first time and Singh starred opposite Akshay Kumar in her first commercial venture.

After short on extras for a scene at Oxford University, the film used website StarNow.com to recruit extras for filming. The first theatrical trailer was released on 23 September 2011, alongside Mausam, whilst the second trailer was released alongside Ra.One on 26 October 2011.

== Release ==
Desi Boyz received an A (adults only) certificate from Central Board of Film Certification, although the makers were expecting a U/A certificate. The movie released in the United States on 23 November 2011 for the Thanksgiving Holiday weekend and released in India two days later on 25 November 2011.

== Reception ==
=== Critical reception ===
Taran Adarsh gave the film 2 stars, owing to the "tedious and least compelling second hour". However, he praised the chemistry of the lead actors, commenting that "the camaraderie between Akshay and John is piping hot". Raja Sen of Rediff.com gave 1.5 stars calling it a disaster. Aniruddha Guha gave the film 2 stars, and called it "more than tolerable", despite recalling that "the film did make [him] laugh out loud about twice." Subhash K. Jha gave the film 3.5 out of 5 Stars calling "highly entertaining sex comedy movie having Smart, sassy, sexy and sparkling with dark audacious humour". The film mainly received positive reviews from the Times of India gave a verdict of "Good". Sify gave it 3 stars as well.

=== Box office ===
Desi Boyz had an above average opening of Rs 275 million domestically in its opening weekend. It showed a 20% increase on Saturday, bringing the two-day total to Rs. 180 million net. The film grossed approximately INR 280 million by the end of the weekend and INR 380 million net by the end of its first week. It raked in INR 342.5 million in its second week taking the total to INR 460 million, it collected a total of INR 540 million in India and INR 770 million worldwide. Desi Boyz was overall declared "Average". Its box office collections were much lower than expected because it surprisingly got an 'A' certificate from Central Board of Film Certification.

== Soundtrack ==
Desi Boyz

Soundtrack album by Pritam Chakraborty
- Released: 19 September 2011
- Recorded: 2010–11
- Genre: Film soundtrack
- Length: 47:40
- Labels: T-Series; Eros Music
- Producer: Pritam Chakraborty

Pritam Chakraborty chronology
Tell Me O Kkhuda (2011)	Desi Boyz (2011)	Players (2012)

The soundtrack was composed by Pritam with lyrics written by Irshad Kamil, Kumaar, and Amitabh Bhattacharya.

The film score is composed by Sandeep Shirodkar.

No.	Title	Lyrics	Singer(s)	Length
1.	"Make Some Noise For The Desi Boyz"	Kumaar	KK, Bob	4:06
2.	"Subha Hone Na De"	Kumaar	Mika Singh, Bohemia, Yo Yo Honey Singh, Shefali Alvares	4:48
3.	"Jhak Maar Ke"	Irshad Kamil	Neeraj Shridhar, Harshdeep Kaur	3:53
4.	"Allah Maaf Kare"	Irshad Kamil	Sonu Nigam, Shilpa Rao, B Praak	3:51
5.	"Let It Be"	Amitabh Bhattacharya	Shaan	4:13
6.	"Tu Mera Hero (Subha Hone Na De)"	Kumaar	Mika Singh, Raja Kumari, Bohemia	4:52
7.	"Allah Maaf Kare" (Remix)	Irshad Kamil	Sonu Nigam, Shilpa Rao	4:41
8.	"Jhak Maar Ke" (Remix)	Irshad Kamil	Neeraj Shridhar, Harshdeep Kaur	3:03
9.	"Subha Hone Na De" (Remix)	Kumaar	Mika Singh, Shefali Alvares, Bohemia	4:59
10.	"Make Some Noise For The Desi Boyz" (Remix)	Kumaar	KK, Bob	4:32
Total length:				43:02

=== Soundtrack reception ===
The music album of Desi Boyz received positive reviews. Joginder Tuteja of Bollywood Hungama gave the album 4 stars, saying "Music of Desi Boyz exceeds expectations" and described the album as "one of the better 'masala' albums of the year." Furthermore, he chose Subha Hone Na De, Allah Maaf Kare, Make Some Noise For The Desi Boyz and Jhak Maar Ke as favorite picks.

The official video of Subha Hone Na De has reached over 358 million views on YouTube as of September 2026.

== Sequel ==
On 22 December 2022, Producers Anand Pandit and Parag Sanghvi announced the sequel titled Desi Boyz 2. The film was expected to go on floors in 2023.
