= Pritam discography =

Indian music composer and singer

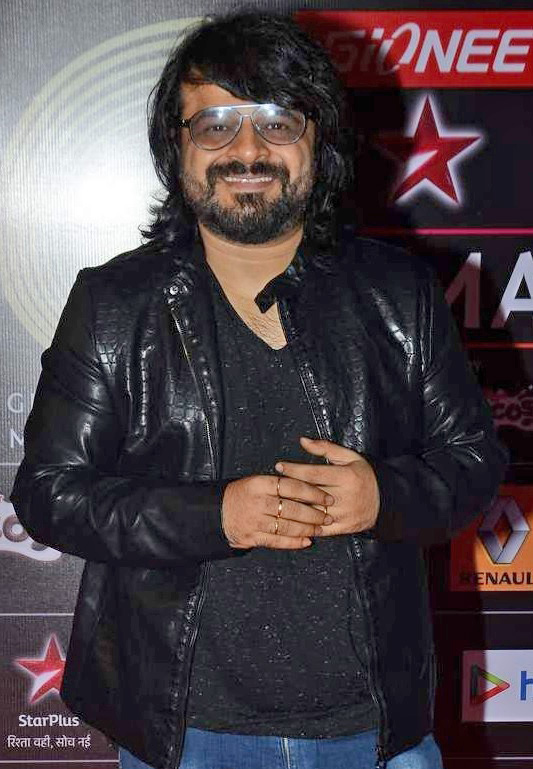
Pritam in 2011

Pritam is an Indian music director, widely known for his work in Hindi-language films. In a career spanning over two decades, Pritam has received 55 awards locally & globally, including 1 National Film Award in 70th National Film Awards, 6 Filmfare Awards for Best Music Director, 3 Filmfare Awards for Best Background Music, 5 IIFA - International Indian Film Academy Awards, 3 Zee Cine Awards, 6 GiMA Award for Best Music Director, 1 Asian Film Awards, 1 Asia-Pacific Film Festival Award and 7 Mirchi Music Awards for Music Composer of The Year from 118 nominations.

He has been frequent collaborators with directors like Mohit Suri,Imtiaz Ali, Anurag Basu, Kabir Khan, Priyadarshan, Karan Johar, Ayan Mukerji, Rajkumar Hirani, Milan Luthria, Rohit Shetty, Abbas–Mustan and more. His frequent lyricists are Kumaar, Mayur Puri, Irshad Kamil, Sayeed Quadri, Amitabh Bhattacharya, Sameer Anjaan and Kausar Munir.

In his long career, almost every popular singer has sung for his films. His frequent playback Singers are Sonu Nigam, KK, Soham ChakrabortyZubeen Garg, Shaan, Kunal Ganjawala, Atif Aslam, Mohit Chauhan, Shreya Ghoshal, Sunidhi Chauhan, Neeraj Shridhar, Tulsi Kumar, Mika Singh and Javed Ali from early phase of his career and Arijit Singh,Rekha Bhardwaj, Antara Mitra, Nakash Aziz, Papon, Amit Mishra, Vishal Mishra, Darshan Raval, Dev Negi, Shilpa Rao, Shalmali Kholgade, Jubin Nautiyal, Raghav Chaitanya, Jonita Gandhi, Nikhita Gandhi from recent times. KK has sung over 70+ songs in almost 50 albums for Pritam.

== Soundtracks ==
=== 2000s ===
Year	Film	Director	Lyricist(s)	Notes
2001	Tere Liye	Sanjay Gadhvi	Abbas Tyrewala	Composed with Jeet Gannguli
2002	Mere Yaar Ki Shaadi Hai	Sanjay Gadhvi	Javed Akhtar	Composed with Jeet Gannguli
2003	Stumped	Gaurav Pandey	Abbas Tyrewala; Zubeen Garg; Shaan	All songs except "Humko Toh Hai Poora Yakeen" and "Ek Sapna"
2003	Mudda – The Issue	Saurabh Shukla	Chandrani Gannguli; Saurabh Shukla; Sanjay Swami	Composed with Jeet Gannguli
2003	Fun 2shh: Dudes in the 10th Century	Imtiaz Punjabi	Pravin Rai; Nitin Raikwar; Amitabh Verma	
2004	Agnipankh	Sanjiv Puri	Ravi Basnet; Sandeep Nath	
2004	Raghu Romeo	Rajat Kapoor	Sanjeev Sharma	
2004	Dhoom	Sanjay Gadhvi	Sameer	Nominated – Filmfare Best Music Director Award Nominated – Star Screen Award for Best Music Director
2005	Chocolate	Vivek Agnihotri	Mayur Puri; Parveen Bhardwaj; Dev Kohli; Ajit Srivastava	
2005	Garam Masala	Priyadarshan	Sameer; Mayur Puri	
2005	Ek Khiladi Ek Haseena	Suparn Verma	Shabbir Ahmed; Amitabh Verma; Dev Kohli; Subrat Sinha; Mayur Puri	
2006	Fight Club – Members Only	Vikram Chopra	Mayur Puri; Neelesh Mishra	Nominated – Global Indian Film Awards for Best Music
2006	Gangster	Anurag Basu	Sayeed Quadri; Mayur Puri; Neelesh Mishra	Nominated – Global Indian Film Awards for Best Music Nominated – Zee Cine Awards for Best Music Director
2006	Ankahee	Vikram Bhatt	Amitabh Varma; Sameer; Subrat Sinha	
2006	Naksha	Sachin Bajaj	Sameer; Mayur Puri	
2006	Pyaar Ke Side Effects	Saket Chaudhary	Mayur Puri	
2006	Bas Ek Pal	Onir	Amitabh Verma; Sayeed Quadri	Composed the song "Hai Ishq"
2006	Woh Lamhe...	Mohit Suri	Sayeed Quadri	All songs except "So Jaoon Main"
2006	Apna Sapna Money Money	Sangeeth Sivan	Mayur Puri	
2006	Dhoom 2	Sanjay Gadhvi	Sameer	Nominated – Filmfare Best Music Director Award Nominated – IIFA Best Music Director Award
2006	Bhagam Bhag	Priyadarshan	Sameer	
2007	Nehlle Pe Dehlla	Ajay Chandok	Sameer; Dev Kohli	Composed three songs "Parvar Digara", "Hoga Hoga Khuda Gawah" and "Nehle Pe Dehla"
2007	Hattrick	Milan Lutharia	Mayur Puri	All songs except "Jab Chhaye Mera Jadoo"
2007	Just Married	Meghna Gulzar	Gulzaar	
2007	Kya Love Story Hai	Lovely Singh	Shabbir Ahmed	
2007	Life in a... Metro	Anurag Basu	Sayeed Quadri; Amitabh Verma; Sandeep Shrivastva	Nominated – Filmfare Best Music Director Award Nominated – Star Screen Award for Best Music Director; Nominated – Apsara Award for Best Music
2007	Raqeeb	Anurag Singh	Sameer	
2007	Awarapan	Mohit Suri	Sayeed Quadri; Asif Ali Baig; Annie Khalid	
2007	Naqaab	Abbas-Mustan	Sameer	
2007	Kaisay Kahein...	Mohit Husein		All songs except "Teri Yaadein"
2007	Darling	Ram Gopal Verma	Sameer	All songs except "Tadap" and "Awaaz Koi"
2007	Dhol	Priyadarshan	Irshad Kamil	
2007	Bhool Bhulaiyaa	Priyadarshan	Sameer; Sayeed Quadri	Nominated – IIFA Best Music Director Award
2007	Speed	Vikram Bhatt	Mayur Puri	
2007	Jab We Met	Imtiaz Ali	Irshad Kamil	All songs except "Aaoge Jab" Won Apsara Award for Best Music Director; Won Zee Cine Award for Best Track of the Year
2007	Dhan Dhana Dhan Goal	Vivek Agnihotri	Javed Akhtar	
2008	My Name is Anthony Gonsalves	Eeshvar Nivas	Sameer	All songs except "Tum Mile" and "Allah Belli"
2008	Bombay to Bangkok	Nagesh Kukunoor	Shabbir Ahmed; Mir Ali Hussain; Ibrahim Ashiq	Composed the song "Dil Ka Haal"
2008	Race	Abbas-Mustan	Sameer	Nominated – Filmfare Best Music Director Award Nominated – IIFA Best Music Director Award
2008	Bhram	Pavan Kaul	Irshad Kamil; Kumaar	Composed two songs "Jaane Kaisa" and "Jaane Kyun"
2008	Jannat	Kunal Deshmukh	Sayeed Quadri; Kamraan Ahmed; R. Mehndi; Neelesh Mishra	Nominated – Star Screen Award for Best Music Director
2008	Haal-e-Dil	Anil Devgan	Munna Dhimman; Sameer; Shabbir Ahmed; Aditya Dhar	Composed the song "Aag Lage"
2008	Kismat Konnection	Aziz Mirza	Sayeed Quadari; Shabbir Ahmed	
2008	Singh Is Kinng	Anees Bazmee	Mayur Puri	All songs except "Title Track"; Nominated – Star Screen Award for Best Music Director Nominated – Apsara Award for Best Music
2008	Mukhbiir	Mani Shankar	P.K. Mishra	Composed the song "Tu Salaamat"
2008	Kidnap	Sanjay Gadhvi	Mayur Puri	All songs except "Mit Jaye"
2008	Golmaal Returns	Rohit Shetty	Sameer	
2009	Billu	Priyadarshan	Gulzar; Neeraj Shridhar; Sayeed Quadri; Ashish Pandit; Mayur Puri	
2009	Ek: The Power of One	Sangeeth Sivan	Mayur Puri	All songs except "Sona Lagda"
2009	Aa Dekhen Zara	Jehangir Surti	Irshad Kamil	Composed two songs "Ghazab" and "Mohabbat Aapse"
2009	New York	Kabir Khan	Sandeep Srivastava; Juniad Wasi	All songs except "Aye Saaye Mere"
2009	Love Aaj Kal	Imtiaz Ali	Irshad Kamil	Nominated – Filmfare Award for Best Music Director Won IIFA Best Music Director Award; Won Apsara Award for Best Music Director; Nominated – Star Screen Award for Best Music Director
2009	Life Partner	Rumi Jaffery	Javed Akhtar	All songs except "Gunji Angna Mein"
2009	Love Khichdi	Srinivas Bhasyam	Amitabh Verma; Shaleen Sharma	
2009	Dil Bole Hadippa!	Anurag Singh	Jaideep Sahni	All songs except "Gym Shim"
2009	All the Best: Fun Begins	Rohit Shetty	Kumaar	
2009	Ajab Prem Ki Ghazab Kahani	Rajkumar Santoshi	Irshad Kamil; Ashish Pandit	Nominated – Filmfare Award for Best Music Director Nominated – Apsara Award for Best Music; Nominated – Star Screen Award for Best Music Director; Won Mirchi Music Listeners Choice Album of the Year; Won Music Director of the Year in RMIM Puruskaar
2009	Tum Mile	Kunal Deshmukh	Sayeed Quadari; Kumaar	Nominated – Star Screen Award for Best Music Director
2009	De Dana Dan	Priyadarshan	Sayeed Qudari; Irshad Kamil	All songs except "Paisa Paisa" and "Title Track"

=== 2010s ===
Year	Film	Director	Lyricist(s)	Notes
2010	Chance Pe Dance	Ken Ghosh	Kumaar	Composed the song "Pe Pe Pe Pein"
2010	Toh Baat Pakki!	Kedar Shinde	Mayur Puri	
2010	Atithi Tum Kab Jaoge?	Ashwini Dhir	Irshad Kamil	Composed two songs "Aaja Aaja" and "Na Jaane Kab Jaoge"
2010	Badmaash Company	Parmeet Sethi	Anvita Dutt	
2010	Raajneeti	Parkash Jha	Irshad Kamil	Composed the song "Bheegi Si"
2010	Khatta Meetha	Priyadarshan	Irshad Kamil; Nitin Raikwar	All songs except "Bullshit"
2010	Once Upon a Time in Mumbaai	Milan Luthria	Irshad Kamil; Neelesh Mishra; Amitabh Bhattacharya	Won Mirchi Music Listeners Choice Album of the Year Won Big Star Entertainment award for song Pee Loon; Won Star Screen Award for Most Popular Music; Nominated – Filmfare Award for Best Music Director; Won Mirchi Music Listeners Choice Album of the Year; Won Big Star Entertainment award for song "Pee Loon"; Nominated – Star Screen Award for Best Music Director; Won Most Popular Music in Star Screen Award; Nominated – Apsara Award for Best Music Director; Nominated – IIFA Award for Best Music Director
2010	Aashayein	Nagesh Kukonoor	Mir Ali Hussain	Composed two songs "Mera Jeena Hai Kya" and "Dilkash Dildaar Duniya"
2010	Hello Darling	Manoj Tiwari	Shabbir Ahmed; Kumaar; Ashish Pandit	
2010	Mallika	Wilson Louis	Sudhakar Sharma	Composed two songs "Chahoon Tujhe" and "Shah e Khubaan"
2010	Crook	Mohit Suri	Kumaar	Nominated – Apsara Award for Best Music Director
2010	Aakrosh	Priyadarshan	Irshad Kamil	
2010	Golmaal 3	Rohit Shetty	Kumaar	Nominated – Zee Cine Award for Best Music Director. Golmaal and Desi Kali and their remixes were co-composed by Amar Mohile.
2010	Action Replayy	Vipul Amrutlal Shah	Irshad Kamil	
2010	No Problem	Anees Bazmee	Shabbir Ahmed; Kumaar; Anand Raj Anand	All songs except "Mast Panjabi" & "Title Track"
2011	Dil Toh Baccha Hai Ji	Madhur Bhandarkar	Neelesh Mishra; Kumaar; Sanjay Chhel; Sayeed Quadri	
2011	United Six	Mahesh Bhatt	Ashish Pandit	
2011	Thank You	Anees Bazmee	Kumaar; Ashish Pandit; Amitabh Bhattacharya	
2011	Dum Maaro Dum	Rohan Sippy	Jaideep Sahni	"Dum Maaro Dum" track from Hare Rama Hare Krishna originally composed by R. D. Burman was recreated for the film with title "Mit Jaaye Gum". Nominated – Apsara Award for Best Music Director
2011	Kucch Luv Jaisaa	Barnali Shukla	Irshad Kamil	
2011	Ready	Anees Bazmee	Amitabh Bhattacharya; Ashish Pandit; Neelesh Mishra; Kumaar	All songs except "Dhinka Chika" Nominated – Apsara Award for Best Music Director; Nominated – BIG Star Most Entertaining Music
2011	Always Kabhi Kabhi	Roshan Abbas	Amitabh Bhattacharya; Irfan Siddiqui	All songs except "Title Track"
2011	Bodyguard	Siddique	Neelesh Misra	Composed one song ("I Love You" and a version "I Love You (Unplugged)") Won BIG Star Most Entertaining Music; Nominated – Apsara Award for Best Music Director
2011	Mausam	Pankaj Kapur	Irshad Kamil	
2011	Tell Me O Kkhuda	Hema Malini	Mayur Puri	All songs except "Title Track", "Someone Somebody" and "Mile Na Tu"
2011	Desi Boyz	Rohit Dhawan	Irshad Kamil; Kumaar; Amitabh Bhattacharya	
2012	Players	Abbas-Mustan	Ashish Pandit	
2012	Agent Vinod	Sriram Raghvan	Amitabh Bhattacharya; Neelesh Mishra	
2012	Jannat 2	Kunal Deshmukh	Sayeed Quadri; Mayur Puri	
2012	Ferrari Ki Sawaari	Rajesh Mapuskar	Swanand Kirkire; Amitabh Bhattacharya	
2012	Cocktail	Homi Adajania	Irshad Kamil	All songs except "Angrezi Beat"; Won People's Choice Awards India for Favorite Movie Album of the Year Won MTV Video Music Awards India VMAI for Best Bollywood Album; Won U.K. Bollywood Cosmopolitan Award for Best Music Album; Won Best Music Director's award in 8th Apsara producers guild Award; Won GIMA Hottest Song of the Year for Daaru Desi; Won Screen Awards for Most Popular Music; Won Zee Cine Award for Best Music Director; Nominated – IIFA Award for Best Music Director; Nominated – Screen Award for Best Music Director; Nominated – Filmfare Award for Best Music Director; Nominated – Song of the Year for "Tum Hi Ho Bandhu" at Mirchi Music Awards; Nominated – Album of the Year at Mirchi Music Awards; Nominated – Music Composer of the Year in Mirchi Music Awards; Nominated – for Best Music award in 8th Apsara Awards
2012	Barfi!	Anurag Basu	Swanand Kirkire; Ashish Pandit; Neelesh Misra; Sayeed Quadri	Won Asia Pacific Screen Awards for Best Music; Won IIFA Award for Best Music Director Won Filmfare Award for Best Music Director; Won Screen Award for Best Music Director; Won Screen Award for Most Popular Music; Won GIMA Award for Most Outstanding Music of the Year 2012; Nominated – Zee Cine Award for Best Music Director; Won RMIM Puruskaar Album of the Year; Won RMIM Puruskaar for Song of the Year for Phir Le Aayaa Dil; Won RMIM Puruskaar for Best Sung Songs (Solo) for Phir Le Aayaa Dil; Won RMIM Puruskaar for Best Sung Songs (Duet) for Aashiyaan; Satish Kalra Sammaan in RMIM Puruskaar; Nominated – Album of the Year in Mirchi Music Awards; Nominated – Music Composer of the Year in Mirchi Music Awards
2012	Rush	Shamin Desai	Sayeed Quadri; Kumaar; Ashish Pandit	All songs except "Mumkin Nahi" & "Hote Hote"
2013	Race 2	Abbas-Mustan	Mayur Puri; Sameer	
2013	Murder 3	Vishesh Bhatt	Sayeed Quadri	All songs except "Hum Jee Lenge"; Song "Jaata Hai Tujh Tak" was co-composed by Anupam Amod
2013	Yeh Jawaani Hai Deewani	Ayan Mukerji	Amitabh Bhattacharya; Kumaar	Won Screen Award for Best Music Director Won Star Guild Award for Best Music; Won GIMA Award for Best Music; Nominated – Filmfare Award for Best Music Director; Nominated – Zee Cine Award for Best Music Director; Nominated – Mirchi Music Award for Composer of the Year
2013	Once Upon ay Time in Mumbai Dobaara!	Milan Lutharia	Rajat Arora	All songs except "Tayab Alli" and "Bismillah"; Pritam's 100th film as a music director
2013	Phata Poster Nikhla Hero	Rajkumar Santoshi	Irshad Kamil; Amitabh Bhattacharya	
2013	R... Rajkumar	Prabhudeva	Anupam Amod; Mayur Puri; Neelesh Misra; Ashish Pandit	
2013	Dhoom 3	Vijay Krishna Acharya	Amitabh Bhattacharya; Sameer; Kausar Munir	All songs except "Bande Hain Hum Uske"
2014	Yaariyan	Divya Khosla Kumar	Amitabh Bhattacharya; Irshad Kamil	Composed three songs ("ABCD", "Love Me Thoda Aur"& "Meri Maa" ) Won Stardust Award for Best Music Nominated – Screen Award for Best Music Director; Nominated – BIG Star Most Entertaining Music; Nominated – Filmfare Award for Best Music Director; Nominated – Star Guild Award for Best Music
2014	Shaadi Ke Side Effects	Saket Chaudhary	Amitabh Bhattacharya	All songs except "Ahista Ahista"
2014	Holiday	A.R Murgadoss	Irshad Kamil	
2015	I Love NY	Radhika Rao; Vinay Sapru	Sayeed Quadri; Mayur Puri	Composed two songs ("Aao Na" & "Halki Halki")
2015	Bajrangi Bhaijaan	Kabir Khan	Mayur Puri; Amitabh Bhattacharya; Neelesh Mishra; Shabbir Ahmed; Kausar Munir	Nominated – BIG Star Entertainment Awards for Best Music; Nominated – Stardust awards for Best Music Nominated – Guild film Awards for Best Music
2015	Phantom	Kabir Khan	Amitabh Bhattacharya; Kausar Minar	
2015	Dilwale	Rohit Shetty	Amitabh Bhattacharya	Nominated – Filmfare Award for Best Music Director
2016	Azhar	Tony D'Souza	Manoj Yadav	Composed the song "Itni Si Baat"
2016	Dishoom	Rohit Dhawan	Kumaar; Mayur Puri; Ashish Pandit	
2016	Ae Dil Hai Mushkil	Karan Johar	Amitabh Bhattacharya	Won Critics' Choice Music Composer of the Year Award at Mirchi Music Awards; Won Critics' Choice Album of the Year Award at Mirchi Music Awards Won Critics' Choice Song of the Year Award at Mirchi Music Awards for "Channa Mereya"; Won Filmfare Award for Best Music Director; Won Stardust Award for Best Music Director; Won Screen Award for Best Music Director; Won Zee Cine Award for Best Music Director; Won Zee Cine Award for Song of the Year for "Channa Mereya"; Won IIFA Award for Best Music Director; Won IIFA Award for Best Background Score; Won BIG Zee Most Entertaining Music Award; Won BIG Zee Most Entertaining Song Award for "Ae Dil Hai Mushkil"; Won Platinum Disc at MT20Jubilee Awards for "Channa Mereya"; Won Platinum Disc at MT20Jubilee Awards for "Ae Dil Hai Mushkil"; Won News18 Movie Award 2017 for Best Music; Won 2017 SpotBoyE Award for Best Music
2016	Dangal	Nitesh Tiwari	Amitabh Bhattacharya	Won Listeners' Choice Album of the Year Award at Mirchi Music Awards; Won Screen Award for Best Music Director
2017	Raabta	Dinesh Vijan	Amitabh Bhattacharya; Irshad Kamil	All songs with JAM8 except for "Main Tera Boyfriend" "Raabta" Track from Agent Vinod originally composed by himself was recreated for the film
2017	Tubelight	Kabir Khan	Amitabh Bhattacharya; Kausar Munir	
2017	Jagga Jasoos	Anurag Basu	Amitabh Bhattacharya; Neelesh Mishra	Won Filmfare Award for Best Music Album; Won Filmfare Award for Best Background Score; Won Listeners' Choice Album of the Year Award at Mirchi Music Awards
2017	Jab Harry Met Sejal	Imtiaz Ali	Irshad Kamil	Composed the song "Phhur" with Diplo; Nominated – Filmfare Award for Best Music Album; Won Critics' Choice Music Composer of the Year Award at Mirchi Music Awards Won Critics' Choice Album of the Year Award at Mirchi Music Awards; Won Critics' Choice Song of the Year Award at Mirchi Music Awards for "Hawayein"
2019	Kalank	Abhishek Varman	Amitabh Bhattacharya	Won Critics' Choice Music Composer of the Year Award at Mirchi Music Awards Won Critics' Choice Song of the Year Award at Mirchi Music Awards for "Kalank Title Track"; Won RMIM Puruskaar for Best Music Director of 2019; Nominated Filmfare Award for Best Music Director
2019	Chhichhore	Nitesh Tiwari	Amitabh Bhattacharya	
2019	The Sky Is Pink	Shonali Bose	Gulzaar	

=== 2020s ===
Year	Film	Director	Lyricist(s)	Notes
2020	The Forgotten Army - Azaadi Ke Liye	Kabir Khan	Kausar Munir; Shloke Lal	Web Series
2020	Love Aaj Kal	Imtiaz Ali	Irshad Kamil	Nominated - Filmfare Award for Best Music Director
2020	Ludo	Anurag Basu	Sayeed Quadri; Swanand Kirkire; Sandeep Shrivatsava; Shloke Lal	Won Filmfare Award for Best Music Director
2021	Tadap	Milan Luhria	Irshad Kamil; Charan; Sholke Laal	
2021	83	Kabir Khan	Kausar Munar; Ashish Pandit; Prashant Ingole	Nominated - Filmfare Award for Best Music Director
2022	Bhool Bhulaiyaa 2	Anees Bazmee	Amitabh Bhattacharya; Sameer Anjaan; Yo Yo Honey Singh; Mandy Gill	A recreated version of the title track was co-composed with Tanishk Bagchi
2022	Laal Singh Chaddha	Adavit Chandan	Amitabh Bhattacharya	Nominated - Filmfare Award for Best Music Director
2022	Brahmāstra: Part One – Shiva	Ayan Mukerji	Amitabh Bhattacharya	Won Filmfare Award for Best Music Director
2022	Freddy	Shashanka Ghosh	Irshad Kamil	
2023	Shehzada	Rohit Dhawan	Amitabh Bhattacharya; Mayur Puri; Kumaar; Shloke Lal; IP Singh; Ashish Pandit	The song "Character Dheela" from the 2011 film Ready, originally composed by Pritam himself, was recreated for the film titled "Character Dheela 2.0". The recreated version of "Character Dheela" was co-composed with Abhijit Vaghani
2023	Tu Jhoothi Main Makkaar	Luv Ranjan	Amitabh Bhattacharya	Nominated- Filmfare Award for Best Music Director
2023	Rocky Aur Rani Kii Prem Kahaani	Karan Johar	Amitabh Bhattacharya; Raja Mehdi Ali Khan	The song "What Jhumka?" is a new song with the iconic Riff tune & lyrics of the 1986 song "Jhumka Gira Re" from the film Mera Saaya composed by Madan Mohan and written by Raja Mehdi Ali Khan, remaining song is originally composed by Pritam; Nominated - Filmfare Award for Best Music Director
2023	The Great Indian Family	Vijay Krishna Acharya	Amitabh Bhattacharya	
2023	Tiger 3	Maneesh Sharma	Irshad Kamil; Amitabh Bhattacharya	
2023	Animal	Sandeep Reddy Vanga	Manoj Muntashir	Composed the song ''Hua Main'' alongside JAM8; Won Filmfare Award for Best Music Director
2023	Dunki	Rajkumar Hirani	Javed Akhtar; Swanand Kirkire; Varun Grover; Kumaar; Irshad Kamil; Amitabh Bhattacharya; IP Singh	Nominated - Filmfare Award for Best Music Director; all songs except "Waheguru"
2024	Merry Christmas	Sriram Raghavan	Varun Grover	Simultaneously shot in Tamil
2024	Chandu Champion	Kabir Khan	Amitabh Bhattacharya; Kausar Munir; IP Singh	
2025	Sikandar	AR Murugadoss	Sameer; Danish Sabri; MellowD; Bombay Lokal; Siddhaant Miishhraa; S.O.M	Along with JAM8
2025	Metro... In Dino	Anurag Basu	Qaisar Ul Jafri; Momin Khan Momin; Ghalib; Sandeep Shrivastava; Anurag Sharma; Neelesh Misra; Mayur Puri; Amitabh Bhattacharya	
2025	War 2	Ayan Mukerji	Amitabh Bhattacharya; Tsumyoki; Brianna Supriyo; RANJ; Shreya Phukan	
2025	Sunny Sanskari Ki Tulsi Kumari	Shashank Khaitan	Jairaj	Composed the songs "Panwadi" and "Ishq Manzoor" along with A.P.S; Credited as a playback singer for "Panwadi"
2026	Bhooth Bangla	Priyadarshan	Kumaar; Mellow D	
2026	Cocktail 2	Homi Adajania	Amitabh Bhattacharya	
2026	Haiwaan	Priyadarshan	Kumaar IP Singh Javed Akhtar Yatindra Mishra Thomson Andrews	
2026	Prahaar: The Untold Story of Ujjwal Nikam	Avinash Arun	Amitabh Bhattacharya	Composed the song"Thuj Mein Basi Meri Jaan"
2027	Tu Meri Zindagi Hai †	Anurag Basu	Sameer; Manoj Muntashir; Raj Shekhar; Rashmi Virag	

== Background score ==
Year	Film	Director	Notes
2012	Barfi!	Anurag Basu	Won – Filmfare Award for Best Background Score; Won – IIFA Award for Best Background Score; Won – Screen Award for Best Background Music; Nominated – Mirchi Music Awards for Technical Background Score of the Year
2013	Yeh Jawaani Hai Deewani	Ayan Mukerji	Won Zee Cine Award for Best Background Score; Nominated – GiMA Award for Best Background Score; Nominated – Mirchi Music Award for Best Background Score
2016	Ae Dil Hai Mushkil	Karan Johar	Won IIFA Award for Best Background Score
2016	Dangal	Nitesh Tiwari	
2017	Jagga Jasoos	Anurag Basu	Won Filmfare Award for Best Background Score
2020	Ludo	Anurag Basu	
2022	Brahmāstra: Part One – Shiva	Ayan Mukerji	
2023	Rocky Aur Rani Kii Prem Kahaani	Karan Johar	
2025	Metro In Dino	Anurag Basu	
2026	Cocktail 2	Homi Adajania	

== Compilations ==
Album	Release date	Record label
Shake It Up	2006	Saregama
Best of Pritam	5 December 2012	T-Series
#1 Hits of Pritam	25 January 2013	Tips Music
Pritam Club	9 February 2013	Unspecified
Best of Me: Pritam	18 June 2013	Sony Music
Best of Pritam – Subhanallah	22 November 2013	T-Series
Radio Favourites – Pritam	28 November 2014	Sony Music
Musical Bond: Pritam & KK	28 May 2015	Sony Music
Pritam's Playlist	28 August 2015	Unspecified
Pritam: My Favourites	25 September 2015	Sony Music

== Singles ==
Song	Film	Year	Lyrics	Singers
"Aise Hi Bada Hua Gavaskar"	Stumped	2003	Gaurab Pandey	K.K, Shaan Anjan Srivastava, Suresh Menon
"U & I (Let's Do Balle Balle) – Part 2"	Naksha	2006	Mayur Puri	K.K
"Kar Salaam"	Life in a... Metro	2007	Sayeed Quadri	Soham Chakraborty, Suhail Kaul
"Khwaab Dekhe (Sexy Lady)"	Race	2008	Sameer Anjaan	Monali Thakur, Neeraj Shridhar
"Karle Mujhse Pyaar"	Toh Baat Pakki	2010	Sayeed Quadri	Rana Mazumder, Soham Chakraborty
"Karle Mujhse Pyaar (Remix)"	Toh Baat Pakki	2010	Sayeed Quadri	Rana Mazumder, Soham Chakraborty
"Pungi"	Agent Vinod	2012	Amitabh Bhattacharya	Mika Singh, Amitabh Bhattacharya, Nakash Aziz
"Pungi (Remix)"	Agent Vinod	2012	Amitabh Bhattacharya	Mika Singh, Amitabh Bhattacharya, Nakash Aziz
"Fatafati"	Barfi!	2012	Amitabh Bhattacharya	Ranbir Kapoor, Arijit Singh, Nakash Aziz
"Selfie Le Le Re"	Bajrangi Bhaijaan	2015	Mayur Puri	Vishal Dadlani, Nakash Aziz, Badshah
"Selfie Le Le Re (EDM Mix)"	Bajrangi Bhaijaan	2015	Mayur Puri	Vishal Dadlani, Nakash Aziz, Badshah
"Phurr"	Jab Harry Met Sejal	2017	Irshad Kamil	Marshmello, Diplo, Mohit Chauhan, Tushar Joshi
"Biba Nachdi"	BIBA	2019	—N/a	Marshmello, Shirley Setia, Dev Negi, Pardeep Singh Sran
"Hockey Hai Dil Mera"	The Hockey World Cup 2023 Song	2022	—N/a	Namita Meleka, Benny Dayal, Neeti Mohan, Amit Mishra, Lisa Mishra, Antara Mitra, Sreerama Chandra, Nakash Aziz, Jonita Gandhi
"Dil Jashn Bole"	The Cricket World Cup 2023 Anthem	2023	—N/a	Amit Mishra, Sreerama Chandra, Nakash Aziz, Jonita Gandhi, Charan, AKASA
"Children of the Sun"	Children of the Sun	2024	IP Singh, Alan Walker	Vishal Mishra, Alan Walker
