= Dunki =

Dunki may refer to:

- Dunki or donkey flight, Punjabi term for illegal entry and illegal immigration, referring to donkey-like long walks by immigrants
  - Dunki (film), a 2023 Indian film based on the issue by Rajkumar Hirani
    - Dunki (soundtrack), its soundtrack by Pritam and Shekhar Ravjiani
- Dangi-ye Akbarabad, a village in Iran
- Dunki, Peren, a village in Nagaland, India

== See also ==
- Dhunki, a 2019 Indian Gujarati-language drama film
- "Dhunki", a song by Neha Bhasin from the 2011 Indian film Mere Brother Ki Dulhan
- Videogamedunkey, an American YouTuber also known as Dunkey
