= Metro... In Dino (soundtrack) =

Soundtrack album by Pritam
- Released: 23 June 2025 (Side A); 14 July 2025 (Side B)
- Recorded: 2024–2025
- Genre: Feature film soundtrack
- Length: 40:06 (Side A); 51:11 (Side B)
- Language: Hindi
- Label: T-Series
- Producer: Pritam

Pritam chronology
Sikandar (2025)	Metro... In Dino (2025)	War 2 (2025)
External audio
- Metro... In Dino – Music Album (Side A) on YouTube
- Metro... In Dino – Music Album (Side B) on YouTube

Singles from Metro... In Dino
- 1. "Zamaana Lage" Released: 28 May 2025; 2. "Dil Ka Kya" Released: 9 June 2025; 3. "Mann Ye Mera" Released: 16 June 2025; 4. "Aur Mohabbat Kitni Karoon" Released: 20 June 2025; 5. "Qayde Se" Released: 1 July 2025; 6. "Hote Tak" Released: 6 July 2025; 7. "Ishq Ya Tharak" Released: 8 July 2025; 8. "Zamaana Lage (Rewind)" Released: 9 July 2025; 9. "Qayde Se (Rewind)" Released: 10 July 2025; 10. "Das Haasil Sau Baaki (Acapella)" Released: 11 July 2025; 11. "Qayde Se (Film Version)" Released: 12 July 2025

Metro... In Dino (transl. These Days in Metro) is the soundtrack album to the 2025 film of the same name directed by Anurag Basu, which is a spiritual successor to Basu's own Life in a... Metro (2007), starring an ensemble cast consisting of Anupam Kher, Neena Gupta, Konkona Sen Sharma, Pankaj Tripathi, Aditya Roy Kapur, Sara Ali Khan, Ali Fazal, Fatima Sana Shaikh and Saswata Chatterjee.

The film's soundtrack and score were composed by Pritam, who also composed the soundtrack for the predecessor. Lyrics for the songs were written by Sandeep Srivastava, Anurag Sharma, Neelesh Misra, Mayur Puri, Amitabh Bhattacharya along with works adapted from poets Qaisar-ul-Jafri, Ghalib and Momin Khan Momin.

The soundtrack was split into two parts: side-A of the film's soundtrack featuring nine songs was released on 23 June 2025, followed by the side-B which was released on 14 July 2025 consisting of 13 songs. Both albums were distributed by T-Series, which is also one of the film's producers.

== Development and production ==
"When Pritam Da and Anurag Da were together, the level of music and their musical understanding was so high that I didn't have to intervene much. They are both exceptionally talented. A good song requires strong music, decent lyrics, and excellent sound production. Pritam is an expert at achieving such a mix. However, Pritam requires the director’s assistance, as well as the support of the situation. And with both of them together, it becomes a lethal combination. Nobody can match that."

— Bhushan Kumar on the collaboration between Pritam and Anurag Basu.

The film's musical score and soundtrack were composed by Pritam, in his sixth collaboration with Basu after their previous collaborations: Gangster: A Love Story (2006), Life in a... Metro, Barfi! (2012), Jagga Jasoos (2017) and Ludo (2020). The soundtrack to In Dino was not influenced by the predecessor's soundtrack, and unlike Metro whose music was darker, the soundtrack to In Dino was "sweeter and lighter". Raghav Chaitanya and Papon were brought is as the members of the new Metro band, after the predecessor's band members: James, Eric Pillai, Soham Chakrabarty and Suhail Kaul. Papon added that "We've been singing together for a long time, but this time, the emotion was more intertwined with the camera, especially with Pritam da. I've never shot so much in my life."

Pritam further considered the film's soundscape as progressive compared to the predecessor. He recalled that rock was not popular in Hindi cinema when they did Metro, hence "there was no concept of rock or a band in a Hindi film", but rock music was fused with synths to become alternative rock and sounds of rock bands also evolved, resulting in Pritam not following the sounds of the first film's music. He further used an established ghazal in Qaisar-ul Jafri's poem "Tumhare Sheher Ka Mausam Bada Suhana Lage" being added to the hook of "Zamaana Lage" to keep it in the rock style. Pritam further used ghazals from Ghalib and Momin Khan Momin and also planned to use a poem from Nida Fazli before backtracking it. All the ghazal songs were made in the modern format, driving away from the traditional harmonium styled ghazals.

Like the predecessor's soundtrack, the album accompanied two versions which featured songs performed by band members and actors in the film, and an array of singers rendering vocals for the album version. Anupam Kher and Aditya Roy Kapur recorded one song each for the film, however, a section of Kher's version has been removed from the edit. The film also marked Kapur's singing debut, who added that he used to sing for his friends and family members, and have not recorded one for the film. However, Pritam wanted all actors, including Kapur, to sing their versions, as it partly looked like a musical and the process happened organically. On 31 May 2025, Pritam released a heartfelt post on missing KK in the album; the singer, who died in June 2022, was also part of the first film's soundtrack, performing "O Meri Jaan" and "Alvida". Basu further dedicated the film as a tribute to the singer, as well as late Irrfan Khan who was also a part of the first film.

== Release ==
Metro... In Dino's soundtrack was split into side-A and side-B; side-A of the film's music album featuring nine songs was released through T-Series on 23 June 2025 at a physical launch event held at Worli, Mumbai. The event which was sponsored by Spotify, featured the attendance of the cast members, along with Pritam, Raghav Chaitanya, Papon, Shashwat Singh, Akasa Singh performing the songs. Arijit Singh, who could not be physically present for the event performed the songs virtually through FaceTime. The side-B album featuring 13 songs was released through T-Series on 14 July 2025.

=== Singles ===
The first single from the side-A album, "Zamaana Lage" was released on 28 May 2025. It was followed by the second single "Dil Ka Kya" which was released on 9 June 2025. The third single "Mann Ye Mera" was released on 16 June 2025, followed by the fourth single "Aur Mohabbat Kitni Karoon" on 20 June 2025. Afterwards, the singles—"Qayde Se", "Hote Tak", "Ishq Ya Tharak", "Zamaana Lage (Rewind)", "Qayde Se (Rewind)", "Das Haasil Sau Baaki (Acapella)" and "Qayde Se (Film Version)"—released subsequently on 1, 6, 8, 9, 10, 11 and 12 July, respectively.

== Track listing ==
Side A
No.	Title	Lyrics	Singer(s)	Length
1.	"Zamaana Lage"	Qaisar Ul Jafri, Sandeep Shrivastava	Arijit Singh, Shashwat Singh	3:16
2.	"Dil Ka Kya"	Anurag Sharma	Raghav Chaitanya	6:00
3.	"Mann Ye Mera"	Neelesh Mishra	Vishal Mishra	4:02
4.	"Aur Mohabbat Kitni Karoon"	Sandeep Shrivastava	Arijit Singh	3:56
5.	"Yaad"	Momin Khan Momin	Papon	4:43
6.	"Mausam"	Qaisar-Ul-Jafri, Sandeep Shrivastava	Arijit Singh	4:14
7.	"Dil Ka Kya" (Encore)	Anurag Sharma	Vishal Mishra	6:00
8.	"Mann Ye Mera" (Rewind)	Neelesh Misra	Raghav Chaitanya	4:02
9.	"Dhaagena Tinak Dhin"	Mayur Puri	Sachet Tandon, Akasa Singh	3:53
Total length:				40:06

Side B
No.	Title	Lyrics	Singer(s)	Length
1.	"Qayde Se"	Amitabh Bhattacharya	Arijit Singh	3:35
2.	"Hote Tak"	Ghalib, Sandeep Shrivastava	Papon	3:53
3.	"Das Haasil Sau Baaki" (Acapella)	Sandeep Shrivastava	Papon, Shashwat Singh, Nikhita Gandhi	3:12
4.	"Ishq Ya Tharak"	Amitabh Bhattacharya	Aditya Roy Kapur, Nikhita Gandhi, Antara Mitra, Shashwat Singh	4:03
5.	"Qayde Se" (Rewind)	Amitabh Bhattacharya	Shreya Ghoshal	3:35
6.	"Mausam" (Mood Shift)	Qaisar-Ul-Jafri, Sandeep Shrivastava	Papon	3:43
7.	"Yaad" (Encore)	Momin Khan Momin, Sandeep Shrivastava	B Praak, Shilpa Rao	4:19
8.	"Qayde Se" (Film Version)	Amitabh Bhattacharya	Papon	3:35
9.	"Hote Tak" (Reprise)	Ghalib, Sandeep Shrivastava	Raghav Chaitanya, Shilpa Rao	4:42
10.	"Aur Mohabbat Kitni Karoon" (Reprise)	Sandeep Shrivastava	Tulsi Kumar	4:02
11.	"Das Haasil Sau Baaki"	Sandeep Shrivastava	Raghav Chaitanya, Neeti Mohan	5:30
12.	"Qayde Se" (Reprise)	Amitabh Bhattacharya	Shilpa Rao	3:05
13.	"Zamanaa Lage" (Rewind)	Qaisar-Ul-Jafri, Sandeep Shrivastava	Shashwat Singh	3:57
Total length:				51:11

== Reception ==
Ritika Srivastav of India Today stated, "The soundtrack of the film is emotional and blends well with the story. The songs feel like another character, just like they did in the first film" but noted the absence of KK, who sang few songs from the predecessor, which led to the soundtrack feeling incomplete.

Sidhangana Mishra of Mirchi Plus wrote, "Metro…In Dino brings back the Anurag-Pritam combo, with music that feels like the heart of the film. Each song talks about something real, like love, breakups, silent moments, or just that in-between feeling we have all had."

Titas Chowdhary of News18 wrote, "it's Pritam magical compositions that truly elevate the screenplay. Unlike Life In A Metro where the Metro Band comprised him, Suhail Kaul and Fahruk Mahfuz Anam (James), Metro In Dino has him along with new additions – Papon and Raghav Chaitanya. And no points for guessing that the trio does appear onscreen to perform the songs as the scenes play out. What a nostalgic ride! Pritam’s songs remain one of the biggest highlights of the film. The pre-interval block that encapsulates the falling action as the musical trio gives tunes to the characters’ heartaches is an absolute delight, almost giving you a feel of watching a live concert."

Rishabh Suri of Hindustan Times wrote, "It's a pity it hasn't managed to top the charts before the film's release, because it truly sucks you in and makes you stay seated. Pritam deserves applause for his compositions, while lyricists Sandeep Srivastava, Mayur Puri, Anurag Sharma, Qaisar Ul Jafri, Neelesh Mishra and Momin Khan Momin weave some lovely songs."

Nandini Ramnath of Scroll.in wrote, "Pritam’s music was one of the highlights of Life in a Metro, and is the mainstay in Metro…In Dino – even though it has to compete with poor lip syncing, Pritam’s own background score and dialogue laid over the songs."

Sukanya Verma of Rediff.com wrote, "Pritam's songs are tuneful but far from groundbreaking."

Kartik Bhardwaj of Cinema Express wrote Pritam’s music flows in the background beading narratives together. The musical performances seem to have an Old Hollywood charm and seem novel and noteworthy. They seamlessly blend tune with tone and might make you get up and shake a leg with these fictional people on the big screen."
