= 83 (soundtrack) =

- Soundtrack album cover (Original version)

Soundtrack album by Pritam
- Released: 23 December 2021
- Recorded: 2019–2020
- Genre: Feature film soundtrack
- Length: 53:47
- Language: Hindi
- Label: Zee Music Company

Pritam chronology
Tadap (2021)	83 (2021)	Laal Singh Chaddha (2022)
External audio
- Official Audio Jukebox on YouTube

83 is the soundtrack album to the 2021 Hindi-language sports drama film of the same name directed by Kabir Khan, based on the Indian Cricket Team led by Kapil Dev, which won the 1983 Cricket World Cup. The soundtrack composed by Pritam, featured 14 tracks with lyrics written by Kausar Munir, Jaideep Sahni, Prashant Ingole and Ashish Pandit. The score is composed by Julius Packiam. The album was released under the Zee Music Company label on 23 December 2021.

== Background ==
The film's soundtrack is composed by Pritam, who worked with Kabir Khan's previous films including New York (2009), Bajrangi Bhaijaan, Phantom (2015) and Tubelight (2017). In January 2019, during the launch of Pritam's apprentice musical platform JAM8, along with Advait Chandan, Karan Johar and Imtiaz Ali, Khan announced that Pritam will compose the music and score for 83. Speaking about the music of the film, Khan said that "Like every other Hindi films, the music will be definitely important in 83 as well, while also becoming an integral part of the film. It is a sports film, so the music is motivational. There will be obviously, an anthem of motivation and songs of several mood in the film." Khan however added that there would be no lip-syncing songs in the film, as "audience will not accept Kapil Dev singing on the streets of London".

"Pritam is a unique talent. He can surprise you a lot provided you pin him down and make him sit with you. Once he is in the flow, that's when the magic starts happening. I've really enjoyed working with him."

— Kabir Khan, on Pritam's inclusion in the film.

On 13 May 2019, Pritam started working on the compositions of the film's soundtrack. Pritam stated that "the film an extremely inspirational story of human triumph with a lot of humour and emotion along the journey and the album will capture all these elements"; adding that the film being more special "due to the memory and the euphoria of the 1983 World Cup victory which is still fresh among the Indians and was a moment for India like no other". While Pritam was assigned to compose the background music, Julius Packiam, however worked on the film's background score.

== Development ==
"I have memories listening to the radio commentary then. But when director Kabir Khan gave me the script to read, I was travelling on a flight from Mumbai to Delhi, and while reading the script, I was crying a lot. It was so emotional. I have always been a Kapil Dev fan, though I am not too much into cricket. I told Kabir it's a brilliant script. When you read a script, you get the basic idea. I knew there was no scope of any song. He just told me to compose an emotional theme. I presented him with a few of them. There is a humming theme which he liked the best."

— Pritam on the music of 83

Pritam read Kabir Khan's script six or seven times, saying it as one of the "best scripts he had read in his career". The film did not have a single situation for a song in the film, which resulted Pritam to work around the theme of the film. In an interview with Outlook India-based critic Samarth Goyal, Pritam had stated "He wanted the music to just play in the background of the matches or the events that were happening. Like how it happens in Hollywood films. There is no lip-sync or anything. But it's like an OST version". Pritam had worked on the music of the film, after the scenes were shot, which he had done for the first time in his 20-year-long career, and he said that "I have never done it before in my career, so yes it was a different experience, to do that. But having said that, it was nice to see music play in your head, when you relive those images on screen and try to connect them with the memories you had of the same match you heard on the radio back then."

== Release ==
The album consisted of 14 tracks, spanning a duration of 53 minutes. The album has six original tracks, with five alternate versions of the tracks, whose duration being trimmed from the original song, or being recorded with a different singer. Three instrumental tracks composed by Julius Packiam, which were used in the background score, were included in the soundtrack. The musical album featured lyrics written by Kausar Munir, Jaideep Sahni, Prashant Ingole and Ashish Pandit, and vocals for the tracks were recorded by Arijit Singh, Benny Dayal, Tushar Joshi, Krishnakumar Kunnath, Amit Mishra, Papon and Raghav Chaitanya.

On 6 December 2021, the first song titled "Lehra Do" was released, sung by Arijit Singh and lyrics written by Kausar Munir. The second song, "Bigadne Do" was released on 13 December 2021, which was sung by Benny Dayal and lyrics were written by Ashish Pandit. As a part of the film's marketing purpose, stills, snippets from the film's trailer and a song titled "Jeetega Jeetega" was showcased at Burj Khalifa, when the team attended the premiere of the film at Red Sea International Film Festival in Saudi Arabia. The film version of the track was later released as a single on 21 December 2021. The full soundtrack album of the film was released by Zee Music Company on 23 December 2021, a day prior to the film's release.

== Reception ==
A reviewer from The Indian Express called the 83 soundtrack as underwhelming and stated that "despite being powerful in its theme, the album fails to make an impact". It further criticised the song "Lehra Do" saying "The song, which talks about keeping the Indian flag flying high, doesn't make you feel patriotic nor relate to the characters much. Given Arijit's voice, the track can be at best passed off as a soulful emotional number, as that fighting spirit is clearly missing." In the film review for The Times of India, Rachana Dubey stated that "the film had scope for some good music which could have added better tempo to the narrative". Anuj Kumar of The Hindu criticised that "Pritam fails to live up to the expectations for a film, that demanded an effective soundtrack and rousing background score.

Contrary to the earlier reviews, Joginder Tuteja of Bollywood Hungama, stated that "the soundtrack is effective despite being used as montages" and gave the album 3.5 out of 5. Sankhayan Ghosh included "Lehra Do" in his Best Hindi Film Music of 2021, in his review for Film Companion. A reviewer from Hindustan Times stated that "The music deserves a special mention. For once, you don't have song and dance sequences that seem forced, as both the tracks "Lehra Do" and "Bigadne Do" play as background music, aptly fitting the situation, evoking emotions." Anna M. M. Vetticad for Firstpost stated that "Pritam's compositions for 83 are moving, but played at a needlessly high volume" while adding that Julius Packiam's background score is "utilised more effectively". Simran Singh of Daily News and Analysis stated "Pritam's music and Julias Packiam's background score sync well with the theme, and the song 'Lehra Do,' is the soul of the film."

== Track listing ==
=== Hindi ===
83 (Original Motion Picture Soundtrack)
No.	Title	Lyrics	Singer(s)	Length
1.	"Lehra Do"	Kausar Munir	Arijit Singh	3:37
2.	"Jeetega Jeetega" (Film Version)	Kausar Munir	Arijit Singh	3:57
3.	"Bigadne De"	Ashish Pandit	Benny Dayal	4:18
4.	"Utth Ja Ziddi Re" (Film Version)	Prashant Ingole	Tushar Joshi	3:58
5.	"Yeh Hausle"	Kausar Munir	K.K.	4:03
6.	"Sakht Jaan"	Jaideep Sahni	Amit Mishra	3:52
7.	"Lehra Do" (Film Version)	Kausar Munir	Arijit Singh	3:20
8.	"Yeh Hausle" (Reprise)	Kausar Munir	Papon	3:18
9.	"Victory at Lords"	—	Instrumental	4:56
10.	"Lehra Do" (Extended)	Kausar Munir	Arijit Singh	3:59
11.	"Utth Ja Ziddi Re"	Prashant Ingole	Raghav Chaitanya	3:58
12.	"The Bouncer"	—	Instrumental	4:01
13.	"World Record 175*"	—	Instrumental	1:42
14.	"Jeetega Jeetega" (Bonus Track)	Kausar Munir	Arijit Singh	4:48
Total length:				53:47

=== Tamil ===
All lyrics are written by R. P. Bala.

83 (Tamil) [Original Motion Picture Soundtrack]
No.	Title	Singer(s)	Length
1.	"Kodiyettru"	Mohammed Irfan	3:28
2.	"Nee Oliyettru"	Benny Dayal	4:17
3.	"Thalarndhidathe"	Amit Mishra	3:53
Total length:			11:38

=== Telugu ===
All lyrics are written by Sriraag Vadlakonda.

83 (Telugu) [Original Motion Picture Soundtrack]
No.	Title	Singer(s)	Length
1.	"Yegarali"	Mohammed Irfan	3:28
2.	"Paduthu Leddam"	Benny Dayal	4:19
3.	"Aagipothe Thappu"	Amit Mishra	3:52
Total length:			11:39

=== Kannada ===
All lyrics are written by Varadaraj Chikkaballapura.

83 (Kannada) [Original Motion Picture Soundtrack]
No.	Title	Singer(s)	Length
1.	"Jayabheri"	Mohammed Irfan	3:29
2.	"Bitthaaku Guru"	Benny Dayal	4:17
3.	"Munde Itta Hejje"	Amit Mishra	3:52
Total length:			11:38

=== Malayalam ===
All lyrics are written by Siju Thiruvaroor.

83 (Malayalam) [Original Motion Picture Soundtrack]
No.	Title	Singer(s)	Length
1.	"Uyarene"	Mohammed Irfan	3:28
2.	"Pinthudarene"	Benny Dayal	4:18
3.	"Kaarirumbu Kaikal"	Amit Mishra	3:51
Total length:			11:37

== Album credits ==
=== Original soundtrack ===
Credits adapted from Zee Music Company

==== Songwriter(s) ====
- Pritam (Composer, Arranger)

==== Performer(s) ====
- Composition, production, musical arrangements, recording, mixing, mastering – Pritam
- Lyrics – Kausar Munir, Jaideep Sahni, Prashant Ingole and Ashish Pandit.
- Singers – Arijit Singh. Benny Dayal. Amit Mishra, Papon, Tushar Joshi, Mohammed Irfan, Raghava Chaitanya and K.K.
