= Life in a... Metro (soundtrack) =

Soundtrack album by Pritam
- Released: 17 March 2007
- Recorded: 2006–2007
- Genre: Feature film soundtrack
- Length: 39:22
- Language: Hindi
- Label: Sony BMG
- Producer: Pritam

Pritam chronology
Kya Love Story Hai (2007)	Life in a... Metro (2007)	Raqeeb (2007)

Life in a... Metro is the soundtrack album to the 2007 film Life in a... Metro directed by Anurag Basu, featuring an ensemble cast of Dharmendra, Nafisa Ali, Shilpa Shetty, Kay Kay Menon, Shiney Ahuja, Irrfan Khan, Konkona Sen Sharma, Kangana Ranaut, and Sharman Joshi in lead roles. The accompanying soundtrack featured 12 songs composed by Pritam with lyrics written by Sayeed Quadri, Amitabh Verma and Sandeep Srivastava. The songs were performed by the newly formed Metro Band, which was prominently featured in the film. It was released through Sony BMG on 17 March 2007. Pritam received the nomination for Filmfare Award for Best Music Director amongst other accolades.

== Background ==
Life in a... Metro is Pritam's second collaboration with Basu after Gangster: A Love Story (2006). As Basu was not ready with the full bound script, he then decided to kill time where he could narrate and Pritam would play one song, who also was not completed with all the songs. While narrating the second half, Basu pointed a critical juncture on a song where Pritam added random lyrics based on food, artists, painters and famous personalities which became the song "Baatein Kuch Ankahein Si". The song "Alvida" was composed during the late-1990s, when Pritam was a struggling artist. Pritam formed the Metro Band which consisted of Suhail Kaul, Soham Chakrabarty, Eric Pillai and Bangladeshi singer Fahruk Mahfuz Anam, who was known under the pseudonym James, which performed the songs featured in the film.

The film version of the songs were different from the album versions. "In Dino" was recorded by Soham, who was initially in the band but could not feature in the shoot while filming the band scenes. Though, Anurag wanted him to lip sync the song, he could not match the version of Soham, resulting in his involvement. Later, Roopkumar Rathod was then chosen to record another version. "Alvida" was sung by both James and KK, and "Baatein Kuch Ankahein Si" was sung by Suhail and Adnan Sami.

== Release ==
The soundtrack was released on 17 March 2007, distributed by Sony BMG and UTV Motion Pictures. The physical launch of the film's music was held a few days later with Pritam and his Metro Band receiving the first copy of the album, along with Shetty, Ahuja and Ranaut. Afterwards, the band toured across Delhi, Mumbai, Kolkata, Pune and Bengaluru performing the film's songs live.

== Reception ==
Karthik Srinivasan of Milliblog wrote "Metro is Pritam's finest effort yet – the composer gives us an excellent, themed soundtrack with the kind of sound we have come to love from Pakistani bands". Sukanya Verma of Rediff.com stated "Metro's soundtrack is throbbing, refreshing and uncompromising". According to the Indian trade website Box Office India, the album was the twelfth highest-selling soundtrack album selling around 11,00,000 units.

== Track listing ==
No.	Title	Lyrics	Artist(s)	Length
1.	"In Dino"	Sayeed Quadri	Soham Chakrabarty	6:41
2.	"Alvida"	Amitabh Verma	KK	5:40
3.	"O Meri Jaan"	Sandeep Srivastava	KK	5:05
4.	"Rishtey"	Sayeed Quadri	Fahruk Mahfuz Anam (James)	7:22
5.	"Baatein Kuch Ankahein Si" (Unplugged)	Sandeep Srivastava	Suhail Kaul	4:02
6.	"Kar Salaam"	Sayeed Quadri	Soham Chakrabarty, Suhail Kaul, Pritam	3:58
7.	"Alvida (Reprise)"	Amitabh Verma	Fahruk Mahfuz Anam (James)	5:48
8.	"Baatein Kuch Ankahein Si"	Sandeep Srivastava	Adnan Sami	4:37
9.	"O Meri Jaan" (Reprise)	Sandeep Srivastava	Suhail Kaul	5:04
10.	"Rishtey" (Revisited)	Sayeed Quadri	Fahruk Mahfuz Anam (James), DJ Nikhil Chinapa, DJ Naveed	6:27
11.	"Baatein Kuch Ankahein Si" (Revisited)	Sandeep Srivastava	Adnan Sami, DJ A-Myth	4:18
12.	"In Dino" (Reprise)	Sayeed Quadri	Roopkumar Rathod	5:18
Total length:				1:04:20

== Accolades ==
Award (Note: Awards, festivals and organizations are in alphabetical order.)	Date of ceremony (Note: Date is linked to the article about the awards held that year, wherever possible.)	Category	Recipient(s)	Result	Ref.
Filmfare Awards	16 February 2008	Best Music Director	Pritam	Nominated	
International Indian Film Academy Awards	6 – 8 June 2008	Best Lyricist	Sayeed Quadri – for ("In Dino")	Nominated	
Producers Guild Film Awards	30 March 2008	Best Music Director	Pritam	Nominated	
Producers Guild Film Awards	30 March 2008	Best Male Playback Singer	Soham Chakrabarty – for ("In Dino")	Nominated	
Screen Awards	10 January 2008	Best Music Director	Pritam	Nominated	
Screen Awards	10 January 2008	Best Lyricist	Sayeed Quadri – for ("In Dino")	Nominated	
Screen Awards	10 January 2008	Best Male Playback Singer	Soham Chakrabarty – for ("In Dino")	Won	
Screen Awards	10 January 2008	Best Background Music	Raju Singh	Nominated	
Stardust Awards	25 January 2008	New Musical Sensation – Male	Soham Chakrabarty – for ("In Dino")	Nominated	
Stardust Awards	25 January 2008	New Musical Sensation – Male	Suhail Kaul – ("Baatein Kuch Ankahein Si")	Nominated	
Stardust Awards	25 January 2008	Standout Performance by a Lyricist	Sandeep Srivastava – ("Baatein Kuch Ankahein Si")	Nominated	
Zee Cine Awards	26 April 2008	Best Music Director	Pritam	Nominated	
Zee Cine Awards	26 April 2008	Best Lyricist	Sayeed Quadri – for ("In Dino")	Nominated	
Zee Cine Awards	26 April 2008	Best Male Playback Singer	Soham Chakrabarty – for ("In Dino")	Nominated	
Zee Cine Awards	26 April 2008	Best Track of the Year	"In Dino"	Nominated	
