= Independents' Consolidation =

Student organization in Kolkata, India

- Abbreviation: IC
- Formation: 1989
- Founded at: Presidency University
- Type: Student organisation
- Legal status: Active

Independents' Consolidation (IC) is a student organization based in Presidency University, Kolkata. It was formed in the erstwhile Presidency College and has won all but five student union elections since its formation in 1989. It describes itself as a "non-partisan independent political platform" that is not affiliated to any established political party.

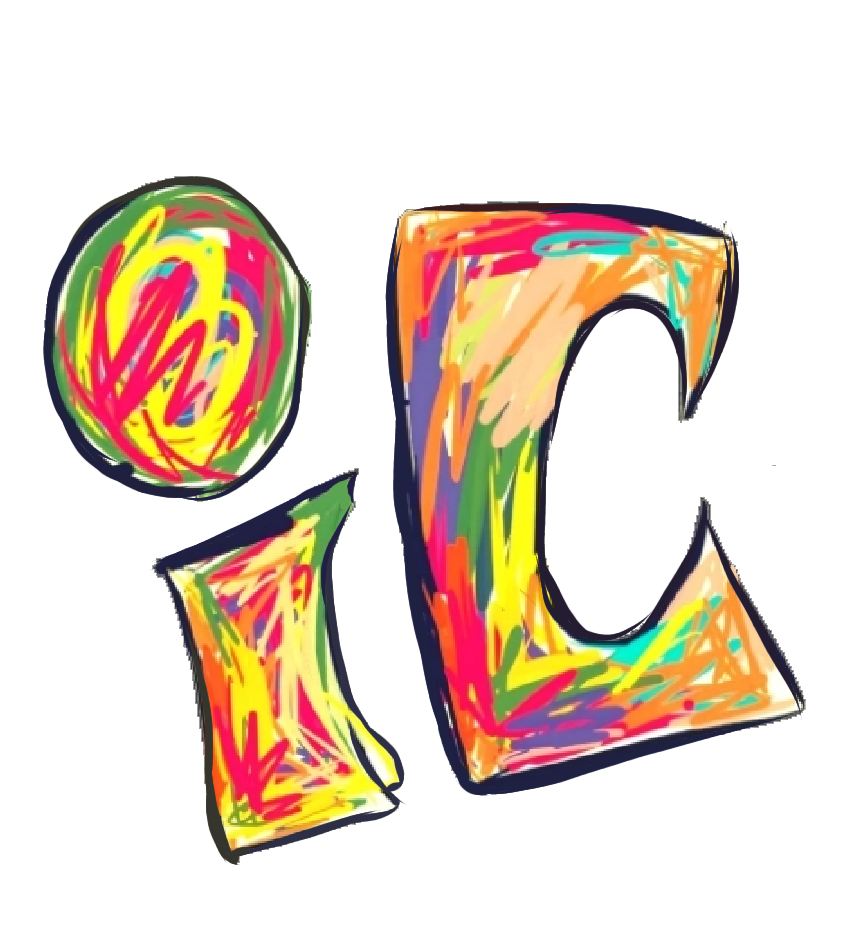

== History ==
The student body of Presidency University has traditionally voted for non-partisan outfits except for 1982, 2002–03, 2008-09 and 2019. The origin of non-affiliated organizations in Presidency go back to the 1960s, with the pro-naxal Presidency College Students' Consolidation. Thereafter, the Presidency College Students' Steering Committee followed a politically middle course from 1975 to the early 1980s. The Presidency College Students’ Association (PCSA), with no stated or clear links to the earlier group, came into the picture in the early 1980s.

The events at Tiananmen Square (1989) and the disintegration of the Soviet Union (1991) had a tremendous impact on the PCSA. Differences cropped up, leading to the formation of the IC in 1989. The announced agenda of the IC was to restore campus democracy and to resist campus violence. The IC broke away from radical left politics and reflected the disillusionment over left politics felt worldwide. Initially a centrist organization, IC’s policies saw a leftward shift after the Left Front government veered towards capitalist camps from 2002. Post Singur and Nandigram violence orchestrated by the Left front, the IC became an alternative for those with leftist tendencies. The IC claims to draw its ideological foundations from mass uprisings like the May 68 protests in France, the Arab Spring, the Occupy movement, the Hok Kolorob Movement, the Anti-CAA protests, and the Anti Farm Law protests - movements "led entirely by people's forces and not political parties". Sunandan Roy Chowdhury has identified The Free Thinkers of JNU (in the late 1970s and the 1980s) and the Independents' Consolidation as two important examples where student politics had moved away from the fold of established parties.

== Activities ==
The Independents' Consolidation has been active through both the Left regime (1989-2011) and the Trinamool Congress (2011–present) rule in West Bengal. Except for 1982, 2002–03 and 2008–09, the IC has been able to keep the ruling party at bay from the Presidency College Students' Union. Consequently, the IC has been at the receiving end of violence orchestrated by both the SFI (student wing of the CPIM) and the TMC. On 21 February 2010, a first year IC supporter had to be hospitalized after being allegedly beaten up by members of SFI when winning candidates of the two organizations assembled for the formation of the college union. On 21 January 2012, a second-year political science student and an IC supporter survived after slashing his wrist when he was thrown out of the Eden Hindu Hostel following weeks of abuse and torture by SFI cadres.

On 18 March 2014, the Independents' Consolidation organized a referendum on whether the then TMC Member of Parliament Sugata Bose should continue as chairperson of the Presidency Mentor Group. Bose lost 1208 to 316. This was following the 2013 TMC attack on Presidency University, where TMC activists had attacked students and rampaged the historical Baker Laboratory with knives, sticks and javelins. Years following the BJP's rise to power in the Centre, Independents' Consolidation has been active in the Anti-CAA protests and the Anti Farm Law protests.

Independents' Consolidation had been part of the Hindu Hostel movement that ensured the reopening of the hostel after three years in 2019.

In May 2021, Independents' Consolidation demanded that the university authority allow the use of the campus as a safe home for non-critical patients to ease the pressure on hospital beds during the COVID-19 pandemic in West Bengal. Although permissions were secured from the State Health Department, the university did not allow the project to go on.

Independents' Consolidation campaigned for the revival of admission tests in 2021, after the university shifted to admissions based on +2 marks during the pandemic.
