= Dunki (soundtrack) =

- Soundtrack album cover for Dunki

Soundtrack album by Pritam and Shekhar Ravjiani
- Released: 20 December 2023
- Recorded: 2022–2023
- Genre: Feature film soundtrack
- Length: 32:29
- Language: Hindi
- Label: T-Series

Pritam and Shekhar Ravjiani chronology
Tiger 3 (2023)	Dunki (2023)	Merry Christmas (2024)
External audio
- Audio Jukebox on YouTube

Singles from Dunki
- 1. "Lutt Putt Gaya" Released: 22 November 2023; 2. "Nikle The Kabhi Hum Ghar Se" Released: 1 December 2023; 3. "O Maahi" Released: 11 December 2023; 4. "Banda" Released: 18 December 2023

Dunki is the soundtrack to the 2023 film of the same name directed by Rajkumar Hirani starring Shah Rukh Khan, Taapsee Pannu, Vicky Kaushal and Boman Irani amongst several others. The album featured eight songs composed by Pritam and one song by Shekhar Ravjiani. The lyrics were written by Swanand Kirkire, IP Singh, Javed Akhtar, Irshad Kamil, Varun Grover, Kumaar and Amitabh Bhattacharya. After four of the songs were released as singles, the album was released on 20 December 2023 through the T-Series label.

== Background ==
Dunki's soundtrack was composed by Pritam in his maiden collaboration with Hirani; it is also the former's fourth collaboration with Khan after Billu Barber (2009), Dilwale (2015) and Jab Harry Met Sejal (2017). Initially Shantanu Moitra, whom had worked with Hirani in Lage Raho Munna Bhai (2006), 3 Idiots (2009) and PK (2014) was considered to contribute a few songs in collaboration with Pritam. Tamil film composer G. V. Prakash Kumar, nephew of composer A. R. Rahman, was also in consideration to score music for the film. However, neither of them signed the film. Pritam composed six songs for the film, with one track "Waheguru" composed by Shekhar Ravjiani from the Vishal–Shekhar duo. Aman Pant composed the film score. Prior to his composing debut, Pritam worked with Hirani on composing jingles for television advertisements before his film debut with Tere Liye (2001) which he co-composed with Jeet Gannguli.

Javed Akhtar contributed the lyrics for the song "Nikle The Kabhi Hum Ghar Se" after Hirani suggested him to write this particular track. Contrary to his norm on writing the lyrics after the tune was composed, Pritam instead suggested that Akhtar write the lyrics and that he would compose a tune surrounding it.

== Release ==
The song "Lutt Putt Gaya" which was referred to the second drop by the film's team was released on 22 November 2023. The song also marked the birth anniversary of Sanjay Gadhvi, following his death that occurred three days before on 19 November. Pritam shared an Instagram post reminiscent of how Hirani and Gadhvi mentored him, and the latter introduced him as a composer in Tere Liye; he further dedicated the song to his memory. Arijit Singh performed the track, which was written by Swanand Kirkire and IP Singh. "Nikle The Kabhi Hum Ghar Se" was referred to as the third drop. The full song was released on 1 December, as the second single from the album. Sung by Sonu Nigam and written by Javed Akhtar, it was described by Khan as his favorite track from the album.

The promo for the third single "O Maahi" was released on 10 December, and the full song was released the following day. This was the last song that KK performed with Pritam and penned by Irshad Kamil. The fourth single titled "Banda" was released on 18 December. It is a rap number performed by Diljit Dosanjh and written by Kumaar. The music video for "Main Tera Rasta Dekhunga", a duet written by Amitabh Bhattacharya and performed by Vishal Mishra and Shreya Ghoshal was released on 27 December. The music video for "Chal Ve Watna" was released on 4 January 2024.

The soundtrack featuring eight songs were released by T-Series on 18 December.

== Track listing ==
Track listing
No.	Title	Lyrics	Singer(s)	Length
1.	"Lutt Putt Gaya"	Swanand Kirkire, IP Singh	Arijit Singh	3:42
2.	"Nikle The Kabhi Hum Ghar Se"	Javed Akhtar	Sonu Nigam	5:00
3.	"O Maahi"	Irshad Kamil	Arijit Singh	3:53
4.	"Chal Ve Watna"	Varun Grover	Javed Ali	4:12
5.	"Banda"	Kumaar	Diljit Dosanjh	2:48
6.	"Main Tera Rasta Dekhunga"	Amitabh Bhattacharya	Vishal Mishra, Shreya Ghoshal, Shadaab Faridi, Altamash Faridi	4:06
7.	"Main Tera Rasta Dekhunga" (Film Version)	Amitabh Bhattacharya	Shadaab Faridi, Altamash Faridi	5:14
8.	"Waheguru" (Music by: Shekhar Ravjiani)	Traditional	Ajay Bijli	3:34
Total length:				32:29

== Reception ==
Sreeparna Sengupta of The Times of India commented that Pritam's music "scores high when it comes to underlining every mood" and described it as "the best Hindi movie music soundtrack of the year". Anuj Kumar of The Hindu complimented Pritam's soundtrack with the songs "Nikle The Kabhi Hum Ghar Se" and "Chal Ve Watna" providing "goosebumps" to the audience. Monika Rawal Kukreja of Hindustan Times said that the film's soundtrack "soothes the soul" where several portions of the film "rely purely on the lyrics or the background music for an impact, and it hits hard".

== Accolades ==
Award	Ceremony date	Category	Recipients	Result	Ref.
Filmfare Awards	28 January 2024	Best Music Director	Pritam	Nominated	
Filmfare Awards	28 January 2024	Best Lyricist	Javed Akhtar for "Nikle The Kabhi Hum Ghar Se"	Nominated	
Filmfare Awards	28 January 2024	Best Lyricist	Swanand Kirkire and IP Singh for "Lutt Putt Gaya"	Nominated	
Filmfare Awards	28 January 2024	Best Male Playback Singer	Arijit Singh for "Lutt Putt Gaya"	Nominated	
Filmfare Awards	28 January 2024	Best Male Playback Singer	Sonu Nigam for "Nikle The Kabhi Hum Ghar Se"	Nominated	
Filmfare Awards	28 January 2024	Best Choreography	Ganesh Acharya for "Lutt Putt Gaya"	Nominated	
