= Dunki, Peren =

Dunki
- village
- Location Nagaland, India Dunki (India)
- Coordinates: 25.603526°N 93.724928°E
- Country: India
- State: Nagaland
- District: Peren
- Circle: Jalukie

Population (2011)
  - Total: 1,500
- Time zone: UTC+5:30 (IST)
- Postal code: 797110
- Census code: 268322

Dunki is a village in the Peren district of Nagaland, India. It is located in the Jalukie Circle.

== Demographics ==
According to the 2011 census of India, Dunki has 325 households. The effective literacy rate (i.e. the literacy rate of population excluding children aged 6 and below) is 68.44%.

Demographics (2011 Census)
	Total	Male	Female
Population	1500	770	730
Children aged below 6 years	239	116	123
Scheduled caste	0	0	0
Scheduled tribe	1124	571	553
Literates	863	464	399
Workers (all)	1180	618	562
Main workers (total)	767	395	372
Main workers: Cultivators	533	270	263
Main workers: Agricultural labourers	202	108	94
Main workers: Household industry workers	1	1	0
Main workers: Other	31	16	15
Marginal workers (total)	413	223	190
Marginal workers: Cultivators	242	136	106
Marginal workers: Agricultural labourers	114	61	53
Marginal workers: Household industry workers	32	10	22
Marginal workers: Others	25	16	9
Non-workers	320	152	168
