= Pritam Chakraborty =

Indian musician and composer

Pritam
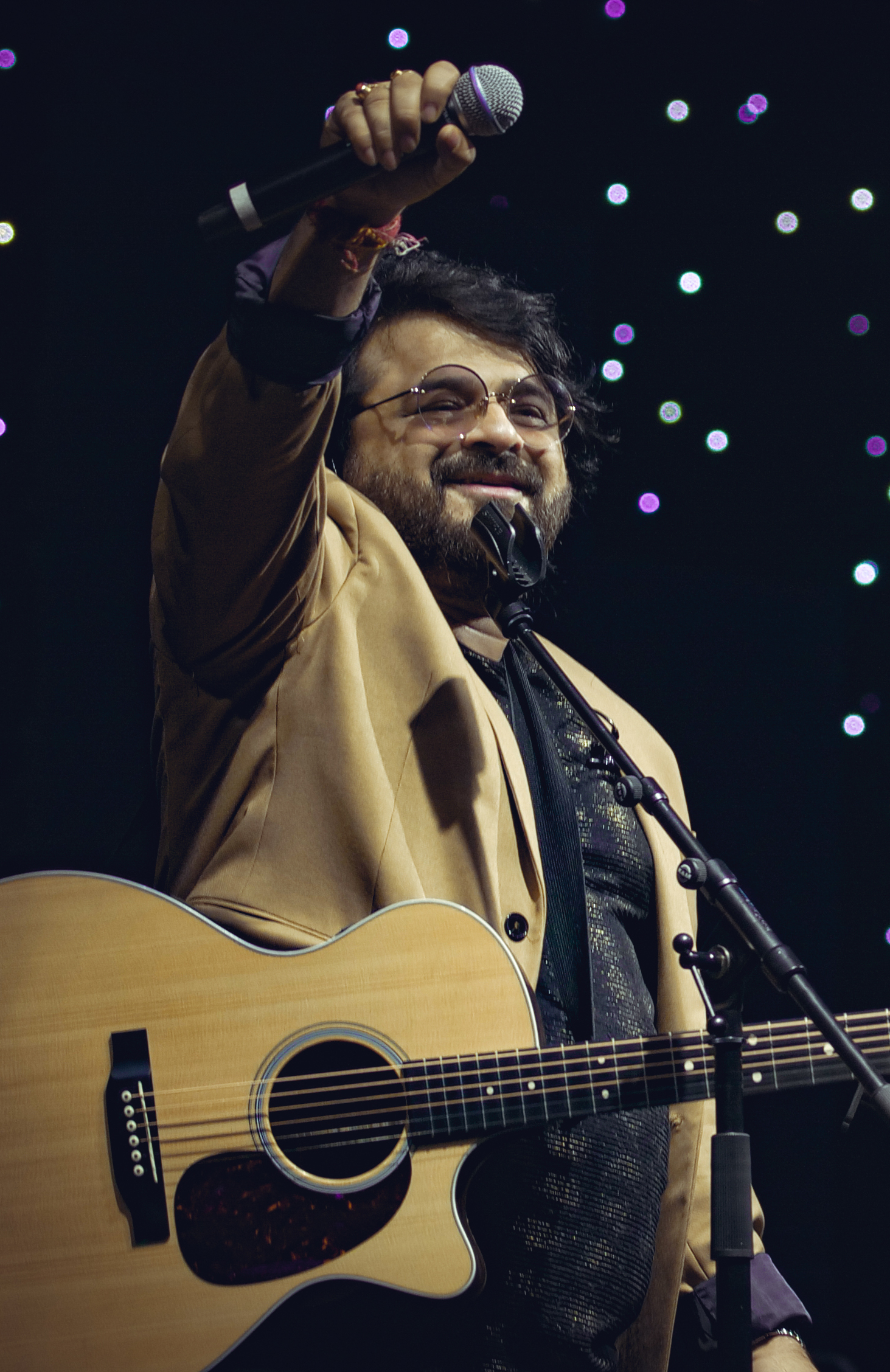

Background information
- Born: Pritam Chakraborty; 14 June 1971 (age 55); Calcutta, West Bengal, India
- Education: Presidency College
- Occupations: DJ, songwriter, composer, music producer, instrumentalist
- Years active: 2001–present
- Award: 70th National Film Awards for Best Music Direction – 2022
- Musical career
- Genres: Film songs, Rock, Pop, Sufi, Bollywood Dance, Ballad, Indian classical music
- Instruments: Vocals; keyboards; harmonium; guitar; synthesizer
- Labels: JAM8, Tips, T-Series, YRF Music, Eros, Zee Music Company, Sony Music India, Saregama

Pritam Chakraborty (born 14 June 1971), also popularly known mononymously as Pritam, is a National Film Award winning Indian composer. Graduating from FTII in Sound Engineering, he worked as an ad jingle composer, sound designer & theme music composer for TV serials, and later debuted as a co-composer alongside Jeet Gannguli in the 2001 Hindi film Tere Liye.

He debuted as a solo composer with the 2003 film Stumped. However, it was the soundtrack of Dhoom (2004), most notably the title track, which earned him his first big break in the industry and helped him win the Zee Cine Award for Best Track of the Year. In a career spanning over two decades, he has composed music for more than 125 Bollywood films and has been the recipient of numerous awards, including a National Film Award in 70th National Film Awards in 2022 and nine Filmfare Awards. While he initially worked only on soundtracks and had multiple early collaborations with Vishesh Films and Yash Raj Films, the romantic drama Barfi! with Anurag Basu marked his first venture as a background score composer, and he later diversified his repertoire through collaborations with Dharma Productions, T-Series Films and Nadiadwala Grandson Entertainment.

Pritam founded JAM8 in 2016, which is an A&R music production platform.

Recently on his birthday, on 14th June 2026, Pritam announced that he is seeking a little break from music to try new things.

== Early life and Education ==
Pritam was born to Anuradha Chakraborty and Prabodh Chakraborty in a Bengali family. He gained his early training in music from his father who used to run a musical school and learned to play the guitar while he was in school.

He went to St. James' School and has a bachelor's degree in geology from Presidency College. Pritam was associated with the non-partisan political platform Independents' Consolidation during his days at Presidency. In 1994, Pritam joined FTII, Pune, where he took up Sound Recording and Engineering.

== Career ==
Pritam formed a band called "Jotugriher Pakhi" with his Presidency batch-mates, for which he played the guitar. They released a cassette around that time. Pritam joined a Bangla band, Chandrabindoo. Later Pritam started the band Metro with James, Suhail, Soham, and Eric Pillai during his film called Life in a... Metro.

=== 1997–2003: Ad-Jingles and Bollywood debut ===
After completing his sound engineering course from FTII Pune, Chakraborty came to Mumbai in 1997. He started composing ad jingles where he met other budding artists such as Shantanu Moitra, Rajkumar Hirani, Sanjay Gadhvi and Jeet Gannguli. Pritam composed renowned jingles for brands like Santro, Emami, McDonald's, Head & Shoulders, Thums Up, Limca, Complan and composed title tracks for TV serials such as Astitva, Kkavyanjali, Ye Meri Life Hai, Remix, Kashmeer, Miilee, and Dil Kare.

Pritam got his first break for Tere Liye (released December 2001). Though the music was well-received, the film missed the mark. In 2002, the Jeet-Pritam duo once again composed music for Yash Raj Films' Mere Yaar Ki Shaadi Hai.

=== 2004–2009: Dhoom, Life in a Metro and Love Aaj Kal ===
Pritam's compositions were noted for their ability to blend Indian classical music with western styles. His compositions for Gadhvi's second film Dhoom were a runaway hit. The title-track of Dhoom in two versions – Hindi (by Sunidhi Chauhan) and English (by Tata Young) – broke geographic barriers becoming popular in pubs in the UK, USA and the East Asia and won him his first Zee Cine Award for Best Track of the Year. He received his first nomination for the Filmfare Award for Best Music Director for the soundtrack of Dhoom.

In 2006, he also composed the songs for Gadhvi's Dhoom sequel, Dhoom 2, which despite mixed critical reviews, achieved major commercial success and became the highest-selling Indian music album of the year. It also earned him his second nomination for the Filmfare Award for Best Music Director.

He followed this up with compositions for films like Gangster, Jannat, Kismat Konnection and Kidnap.

In 2007, his compositions for Anurag Basu's Life in a... Metro garnered him widespread critical acclaim. He formed a band called Metro with Suhail Kaul, Sohu pet name Chakraborty, Eric Pillai and Bangladeshi singer James for the film. He won his second Zee Cine Award for Best Track of the Year for the song "Mauja Hi Mauja" from Jab We Met by Imtiaz Ali. Jab We Met won him his first Producers Guild Film Award for Best Music Director. Both Jab We Met and Life in a... Metro earned him his third and fourth nominations for the Filmfare Award for Best Music Director.

He then composed the soundtracks of Jab We Met (2007), Race (2008), Kismat Konnection (2008), Kidnap (2008), Love Aaj Kal (2009) and Ajab Prem Ki Ghazab Kahani (2009), all of which earned him his fifth, sixth and seventh nominations for the Filmfare Award for Best Music Director.

=== 2010–2014: Cocktail, Barfi! and Yeh Jawani Hai Deewani ===
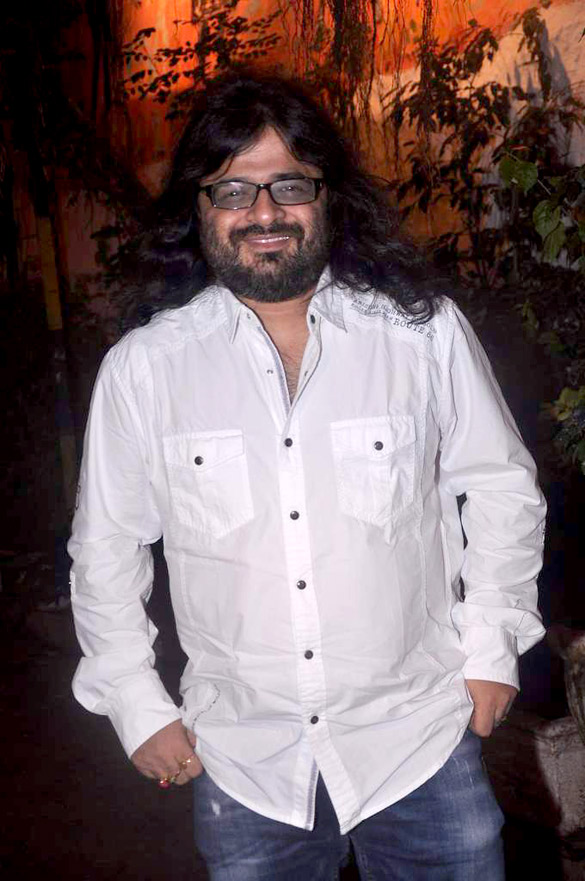
Pritam Chakraborty at a success bash for Cocktail

His Sufi songs for the 2010 film Once Upon A Time in Mumbaai were popular with the masses and songs like "Pee Loon" and "Tum Jo Aaye" were declared chartbusters, earning him his eighth nomination for the Filmfare Award for Best Music Director. He teamed up again with Mahesh Bhatt and Vishesh Films for music of Crook of which the song "Mere Bina" got instant recognition with public. His foot-tapping numbers for Rohit Shetty's Golmaal 3 were also equally successful. In 2011, he got to work for Salman Khan's Ready and Bodyguard. He recreated the famous 1971 song, "Dum Maro Dum" for Ramesh Sippy's 2011 movie of the same name. He then composed for the romance Mausam which had a strong influence of Punjabi. The songs were phenomenal hits in Northern India with "Rabba Main To Mar Gaya Oye" being a rage among people.

In 2012, he composed several successful songs for films like Players, Agent Vinod, Jannat 2 and Vidhu Vinod Chopra's Ferrari Ki Sawaari, where he worked with Rajkumar Hirani. Later that year, he scored the music for Barfi! which won him two awards, including his first Filmfare Award for Best Music Director. Barfi is considered to be one of the most critically acclaimed soundtrack album of his career. He also reunited with Imtiaz Ali for the romantic comedy-drama Cocktail, which earned highly positive reviews, in addition to his tenth nomination for the Filmfare Award for Best Music Director.

In 2013, he composed music for films such as Race 2, Murder 3, Yeh Jawaani Hai Deewani, Dhoom 3 and Once Upon ay Time in Mumbai Dobaara which was his 100th film as a Music Director in Bollywood. Yeh Jawaani Hai Deewani in particular proved to be a milestone in Pritam's career, earning him widespread critical acclaim and accolades, and proved to be the highest selling Indian music album of the year. It also earned him his eleventh nomination for the Filmfare Award for Best Music Director.

He started 2014 with compositions for Yaariyan, Shaadi Ke Side Effects & Holiday: A Soldier Is Never Off Duty. He then took a break in 2014. He received his twelfth nomination for the Filmfare Award for Best Music Director for Yaariyan.

=== 2015–2017: Ae Dil Hai Mushkil and Jagga Jasoos ===
He marked his return with three successful albums in 2015: Kabir Khan's Bajrangi Bhaijaan & Phantom and Rohit Shetty's Dilwale for which he earned his thirteenth nomination for the Filmfare Award for Best Music Director. The song, "Gerua" from Dilwale directly opened at the No. 1 position on the Radio Mirchi charts and became the first Bollywood song to cross 100 million views on YouTube in the shortest duration ever. It also ranked in the top slot in places like Malaysia, Oman, Sri Lanka and Bahrain.

In 2016, he appeared as a guest composer and composed the song "Itni Si Baat Hai" for Azhar; the albums other composers were Amaal Mallik and DJ Chetas. He also composed the soundtracks of Dishoom, Ae Dil Hai Mushkil and Dangal. The soundtrack of Ae Dil Hai Mushkil proved to be yet another milestone in Pritam's career, earning him career-best reviews and accolades, including his second Filmfare Award for Best Music Director.

In 2017, he composed the soundtracks of Jagga Jasoos (which earned him his third Filmfare Award for Best Music Director), Raabta along with Sohrabuddin, Sourav Roy and JAM8, Tubelight and Jab Harry Met Sejal along with Diplo, earning his sixteenth nomination for the Filmfare Award for Best Music Director.

=== 2019–present: Kalank, Ludo and Brahmāstra: Part One – Shiva ===
After a break in 2018, he return to composing in 2019 with Chhichhore and Kalank, earning his seventeenth nomination for the Filmfare Award for Best Music Director for the latter.

In 2020, he composed the soundtracks of Love Aaj Kal (which earned him his eighteenth nomination for the Filmfare Award for Best Music Director) and Ludo. For Ludo, he won his fourth Filmfare Award for Best Music Director.

In 2021, he composed songs for Tadap and 83.

In 2022, he composed all the songs of Brahmāstra: Part One – Shiva, Bhool Bhulaiyaa 2 and Laal Singh Chaddha (which earned him his twentieth nomination for the Filmfare Award for Best Music Director). For Brahmāstra: Part One – Shiva, he won his fifth Filmfare Award for Best Music Director, Zee Cine Award for Best Music Director among others. The song "Kesariya" from Brahmastra topped the Spotify India charts for 16 weeks and became the first Indian song to cross 300 and 400 million streams on Spotify.

In 2023, he composed for Shehzada, Tu Jhoothi Main Makkaar, Rocky Aur Rani Kii Prem Kahaani, The Great Indian Family, Tiger 3, Animal (1 song), and Dunki. In 2024, he composed for Merry Christmas, Chandu Champion, Metro... In Dino, and Bhool Bhulaiyaa 3.

In 2025, Pritam composed the soundtrack for War 2, directed by Ayan Mukerji and produced by Aditya Chopra under Yash Raj Films. This marked his second collaboration with Hrithik Roshan after Dhoom 2 and his first with N. T. Rama Rao Jr. The film's music was designed to showcase the dance prowess of both lead actors, with the team aiming to elevate the musical scale of the YRF Spy Universe. The lyrics were written by Amitabh Bhattacharya, and the background score was provided by Sanchit Balhara and Ankit Balhara.

== Musical style ==
Pritam has composed and covered some popular songs in a variety of genres including Rock (Life in a... Metro), Sufi (Once Upon A Time in Mumbaai) and even Ghazals (Barfi). His musical style is mainly characterised as a delicate fusion of Indian classical music with contemporary undertones.

== Allegations of plagiarism ==
The website iTwoFs alleged that 52 of Pritam's songs released between 2004 and 2010 were copied or similar to songs by other artists. Especially famous songs of Pritam, like "Tikhi Tikhi", "Allah Duhai Hain" and some others were found to be copied or plagiarised from Turkish famous singer Tarkan.

In an interview with Hindustan Times, Pritam commented on the allegations of plagiarism in his music, "Yes, I did make mistakes initially. But once I realised it, I have been particular about my music. However, people keep making false allegations, because it's easy to do that. Since the last three years, I have stopped taking false allegations seriously. For example, the Iranian band that said I had plagiarised "Pungi" [from Agent Vinod (2012) and] had to give an apology in court for using my name falsely."

== On screen appearance ==
=== Music videos and films ===
- Gangster (music video for the song "Bheegi Bheegi")
- Life in A... Metro (guest appearance)
- Jab Harry Met Sejal (promotional music video for the song "Safar")
- "Biba" Marshmello x Pritam, Shirley Setia (music video)
- Metro… In Dino (special appearance)

=== Television ===
Pritam mentored and judged Sa Re Ga Ma Pa Challenge 2009 and was a judge for Chhote Ustaad on Zee TV. He was also a guest judge for the X factor and Zee Bangla's Sa Re Ga Ma Pa 2012–13. He also composed the title track for Hrithik Roshan's TV series Just Dance for Star TV which was sung by KK. Pritam sang some of his top hits on the popular show MTV Unplugged (Season 5) on 13 February 2016. Pritam is the mentor and judge of Sa Re Ga Ma Pa 2016 alongside Mika Singh and Sajid–Wajid. He was also a part of Star plus' show Dil Hai Hindustani as a judge alongside Sunidhi Chauhan and Badshah in 2018.

== World Cup Anthem ==
ICC Cricket World Cup 2023 Anthem "Dil Jashn Jashn Boley" is composed by Pritam. The music video featured Pritam & Ranveer Singh.

2023 Men's FIH Hockey World Cup Anthem "Hockey Hai Dil mera" is composed by Pritam.

== Streaming Platform ==
Pritam is one of the most highest streamed artist world wide in Spotify. He is ranked among the top artists worldwide in List of most-streamed artists on Spotify. Pritam's highest ranking till date is 68th in Spotify. He is also the 2nd most streamed artist of India Spotify Wrapped since 2021 till 2024 with consistently holding the 2nd spot behind Arijit Singh for consecutive 4 years in a row.

== Awards and nominations ==
In a career spanning over two decades, Pritam has received 55 awards locally & globally, including 1 National Film Award for Best Music Direction in 70th National Film Awards, 6 Filmfare Awards for Best Music Director, 3 Filmfare Awards for Best Background Music, 5 IIFA Awards, 3 Zee Cine Awards, 6 GiMA Award for Best Music Director, 1 Asian Film Awards, 1 Asia-Pacific Film Festival Award and 7 Mirchi Music Awards for Music Composer of The Year from 118 nominations.[4]

Year	Film	Award	Category	Result
2003	Kashmeer	Indian Television Academy Awards	ITA Award for Best Title Music/Song Track	Won
2005	Remix	Indian Television Academy Awards	ITA Award for Best Title Music/Song Track	Won
2005	Dhoom	Filmfare Awards	Filmfare Award for Best Music Director	Nominated
2006	Kkavyanjali	Indian Television Academy Awards	ITA Award for Best Title Music/Song Track	Won
2007	Kkavyanjali	Indian Television Academy Awards	ITA Award for Best Title Music/Song Track	Nominated
2007	Dhoom 2	Filmfare Awards	Filmfare Award for Best Music Director	Nominated
2008	Life in a Metro	Filmfare Awards	Filmfare Award for Best Music Director	Nominated
2008	Jab We Met	Filmfare Awards	Filmfare Award for Best Music Director	Nominated
2009	Race	Filmfare Awards	Filmfare Award for Best Music Director	Nominated
2010	Ajab Prem Ki Ghazab Kahani	Filmfare Awards	Filmfare Award for Best Music Director	Nominated
2010	Love Aaj Kal	Filmfare Awards	Filmfare Award for Best Music Director	Nominated
2010	Love Aaj Kal	International Indian Film Academy Awards	IIFA Award for Best Music Director	Won
2010	Once Upon A Time in Mumbaai	Mirchi Music Awards	Album of the Year	Won
2010	Once Upon A Time in Mumbaai	Mirchi Music Awards	Music Composer of the Year for the song "Pee Loon"	Won
2011	Once Upon A Time in Mumbaai	Filmfare Awards	Filmfare Award for Best Music Director	Nominated
2011	Bodyguard	Mirchi Music Awards	Album of the Year	Nominated
2012	Barfi	Asia Pacific Screen Awards	Asia Pacific Screen Awards for Best Music	Won
2012	Barfi	Asian Film Awards	Asian Film Awards for Best Music	Won
2012	Barfi	Mirchi Music Awards	Album of the Year	Nominated
2012	Barfi	Mirchi Music Awards	Music Composer of the Year for the song "Ala Barfi"	Nominated
2012	Barfi	Mirchi Music Awards	Music Composer of the Year for the song "Phir Le Aya Dil"	Nominated
2012	Barfi	Mirchi Music Awards	Background Score of the Year	Nominated
2012	Cocktail	Mirchi Music Awards	Album of the Year	Nominated
2012	Cocktail	Mirchi Music Awards	Music Composer of the Year for the Song "Tum Hi Ho Bandhu"	Nominated
2013	Barfi	Filmfare Awards	Filmfare Award for Best Background Score	Won
2013	Barfi	Filmfare Awards	Filmfare Award for Best Music Director	Won
2013	Cocktail	Filmfare Awards	Filmfare Award for Best Music Director	Nominated
2013	Barfi	International Indian Film Academy Awards	IIFA Award for Best Music Director	Won
2013	Cocktail	International Indian Film Academy Awards	IIFA Award for Best Music Director	Nominated
2013	Cocktail	MTV VMAI Awards	Best Bollywood Album	Won
2013	Cocktail	Zee Cine Awards	Zee Cine Award for Best Music Director	Won
2014	Yeh Jawaani Hai Deewani	Filmfare Awards	Filmfare Award for Best Music Director	Nominated
2014	Yeh Jawaani Hai Deewani	International Indian Film Academy Awards	IIFA Award for Best Music Director	Nominated
2015	Yaariyan	International Indian Film Academy Awards	IIFA Award for Best Music Director	Nominated
2015	Yaariyan	Filmfare Awards	Filmfare Awards	Nominated
2015	Dilwale	Mirchi Music Awards	Music Composer of the Year	Nominated
2016	Dilwale	Filmfare Awards	Filmfare Award for Best Music Director	Nominated
2016	Ae Dil Hai Mushkil	Mirchi Music Awards	Album of the Year	Won
2016	Ae Dil Hai Mushkil	Mirchi Music Awards	Music Composer of the Year	Won
2016	Ae Dil Hai Mushkil	Mirchi Music Awards	Music Composer of the Year for the song "Channa Mereya"	Nominated
2016	Ae Dil Hai Mushkil	Mirchi Music Awards	Music Composer of the Year for the song "Bulleya"	Nominated
2016	Ae Dil Hai Mushkil	Mirchi Music Awards	Best Background Score	Nominated
2016	Dangal	Mirchi Music Awards	Album of the Year	Nominated
2016	Dangal	Mirchi Music Awards	Best Background Score	Nominated
2017	Ae Dil Hai Mushkil	Filmfare Awards	Filmfare Award for Best Music Director	Won
2017	Ae Dil Hai Mushkil	International Indian Film Academy Awards	IIFA Award for Best Music Director	Won
2017	Ae Dil Hai Mushkil	International Indian Film Academy Awards	IIFA Award for Best Background Score	Won
2017	Ae Dil Hai Mushkil	Zee Cine Awards	Zee Cine Award for Best Music Director	Won
2017	Jagga Jasoos	Mirchi Music Awards	Album of the Year	Nominated
2017	Jagga Jasoos	Mirchi Music Awards	Best Background Score	Nominated
2017	Raabta	Mirchi Music Awards	Album of the Year	Nominated
2018	Jagga Jasoos	Filmfare Awards	Filmfare Award for Best Music Director	Won
2018	Jagga Jasoos	Filmfare Awards	Filmfare Award for Best Background Score	Won
2018	Jagga Jasoos	International Indian Film Academy Awards	IIFA Award for Best Music Director	Nominated
2018	Jagga Jasoos	International Indian Film Academy Awards	IIFA Awards for Best Background Score	Won
2018	Jab Harry Met Sejal	Filmfare Awards	Filmfare Award for Best Music Director	Nominated
2020	Kalank	Filmfare Awards	Filmfare Award for Best Music Director	Nominated
2021	Ludo	Filmfare Awards	Filmfare Award for Best Music Director	Won
2021	Ludo	Filmfare Awards	Filmfare Award for Best Background Score	Won
2021	Love Aaj Kal	Filmfare Awards	Filmfare Award for Best Music Director	Nominated
2022	Ludo	International Indian Film Academy Awards	IIFA Award for Best Music Director	Nominated
2022	83	International Indian Film Academy Awards	IIFA Award for Best Music Director	Nominated
2023	Brahmastra: Part One – Siva	International Indian Film Academy Awards	IIFA Award for Best Music Director	Won
2023	Brahmastra: Part One – Siva	Filmfare Awards	Filmfare Award for Best Music Director	Won
2023	Brahmastra: Part One – Siva	Mirchi Music Awards	Album of the Year	Nominated
2023	Brahmastra: Part One – Siva	Mirchi Music Awards	Song of the Year for the song "Kesariya"	Won
2023	Brahmastra: Part One – Siva	Mirchi Music Awards	Music Composer of the Year for the song ''Kesariya''	Nominated
2023	Brahmastra: Part One – Siva	Mirchi Music Awards	Music Composer of the Year for the song ''Deva Deva''	Nominated
2023	Brahmastra: Part One – Siva	Mirchi Music Awards	Best Background Score	Won
2023	Brahmastra: Part One – Siva	Mirchi Music Awards	Listener's Choice Album of the Year	Pending
2023	Brahmastra: Part One – Siva	Mirchi Music Awards	Listener's Choice Film Song of the Year for the song ''Kesariya''	Pending
2023	Brahmastra: Part One – Siva	Zee Cine Awards	Zee Cine Award for Best Music Director	Won
2023	Brahmastra: Part One – Siva	National Film Awards	National Film Award for Best Music Direction	Won
2023	Laal Singh Chaddha	Filmfare Awards	Filmfare Award for Best Music Director	Nominated
2023	Laal Singh Chaddha	Mirchi Music Awards	Album of the Year	Won
2023	Laal Singh Chaddha	Mirchi Music Awards	Listener's Choice Album of the Year	Pending
2023	Bhool Bhulaiyaa 2	International Indian Film Academy Awards	IIFA Award for Best Music Director	Nominated
2024	Animal	Filmfare Awards	Filmfare Award for Best Music Director	Won
2024	Dunki	Filmfare Awards	Filmfare Award for Best Music Director	Nominated
2024	Rocky Aur Rani Kii Prem Kahaani	Filmfare Awards	Filmfare Award for Best Music Director	Nominated
2024	Tu Jhoothi Main Makkaar	Filmfare Awards	Filmfare Award for Best Music Director	Nominated
2025	Bhool Bhulaiyaa 3	Filmfare Awards	Best Music Album	Nominated

== Sales ==
The following table lists the sales of Pritam's top-selling Hindi film music soundtrack albums in India.

Year	Film	Sales	Annual Rank	Notes
2002	Mere Yaar Ki Shaadi Hai	1,100,000	12	
2004	Dhoom	2,200,000	3	
2006	Dhoom 2	2,000,000	1	
2006	Gangster	1,600,000	5	
2007	Jab We Met	1,900,000	2	
2007	Bhool Bhulaiyaa	1,200,000	8	
2007	Life in a... Metro	1,100,000	12	
2008	Singh Is Kinng	1,800,000	3	
2008	Race	1,700,000	5	
2008	Jannat	1,600,000	7	
2008	Golmaal Returns	1,400,000	10	
2008	Kismat Konnection	1,000,000	15	
Known album sales	—N/a	18,600,000	—N/a	
